= Blue Hearts ga Kikoenai =

Blue Hearts ga Kikoenai History of the Blue Hearts
- DVD cover

Video by The Blue Hearts
- Released: February 7, 1996 (VHS); May 26, 2004 (DVD)
- Genre: Rock
- Length: 122m
- Language: Japanese
- Label: Meldac Records
- Producer: The Blue Hearts

Blue Hearts ga Kikoenai - History of the Blue Hearts (ブルーハーツが聞こえない History of the Blue Hearts) was a compilation video album released by the Japanese band The Blue Hearts. The video served to record the history of the band, from its formation in 1985 to its breakup in 1995.

The video itself does not play any of the band's songs in its entirety. Instead, it uses various song clips, either from live performances, promotional videos, or recorded albums, interspersed with commentary to show viewers the history of the band. The video includes a narration to move between the clips.

== Chapter Listing ==
Below is the chapter listing on the back of the DVD release, which differs slightly from the original VHS release.

1. "Hito ni Yasashiku"
2. "1985"
3. "Linda Linda", "Owaranai Uta", "Mado wo Akeyō"
4. Staff interview
5. "Blue Hearts Theme", "Hammer", "Shōnen no Uta", "Punk Rock"
6. Rehearsal at Hibiya Yaon
7. "Bakudan ga Okkochiru Toki", "No No No"
8. "Mirai wa Bokura no Te no Naka", "Hadaka no Ō-sama", "Roku de Nashi", "Blue Hearts Yori Ai o Komete"
9. "Line o Koete", "Dance Number", "Linda Linda"
10. "Hito ni Yasashiku", "Eiyū ni Akogarete", "Owaranai Uta", "Chernobyl"
11. "Love Letter"
12. "Fūsen Bakudan", "Denkō Sekka"
13. "Sekai no Mannaka"
14. "Blue Hearts Theme", "Roku de Nashi", "No No No", "Dance Number", "Kimi no Tame", "Blues o Ketobase", "Kiss Shite Hoshii", "Omae o Hanasanai", "Train-Train", "Too Much Pain"
15. "Aozora", "Dance Number"
16. "Hito ni Yasashiku"
17. "Kubitsuri-dai Kara"
18. "Kiss Shite Hoshii"
19. "Tatakau Otoko"
20. "Koroshi no License"
21. "Jōnetsu no Bara", "Image", "Navigator"
22. "Ano Ko ni Touch", "Mirai wa Bokura no Te no Naka", "Bakudan ga Okkochiru Toki"
23. "The Rolling Man"
24. "Too Much Pain"
25. "Minagoroshi no Melody", "Tokyo Zombie", "No No No", "The Rolling Man"
26. "Nakanaide Koibito Yo"
27. "Jōnetsu no Bara"
28. "Yume", "Yaru ka Nigeru ka"
29. "Train-Train", "Boku no Migite", "Jōnetsu no Bara"
30. "Party"
31. "Sutegoma", "Tabibito", "44 Kōkei"
32. "Yūgure"
33. "Yume", "Ore wa Ore no Shi o Shinitai"
34. "Tegami", "Yoru no Tōzokudan", "Tsuki no Bakugekiki", "1000 no Violin"
35. "Shōnen no Uta", "Sekai no Mannaka", "Romantic", "Kimi no Tame"
36. "Hito ni Yasashiku"
37. "Aruku Hana"
38. "Kyūjitsu"
39. "Linda Linda"
40. "Blue Hearts Yori Ai o Komete"
