= King of Mix =

The Blue Hearts King of Mix

Remix album by Tōzokudan
- Released: May 25, 1994
- Genre: Techno
- Length: 73:12
- Language: Japanese
- Label: East West Japan
- Producer: Yū Imai

King of Mix (キングオブミックス) is a remix album dedicated to the Japanese group The Blue Hearts. It was recorded by various artists in 1994, but they named their group "Tōzokudan" (盗賊団 Thieves) for this release. Their name refers to Blue Hearts' song "Yoru no Tōzokudan" (夜の盗賊団 Night Thieves) from their album Dug Out.

== Background ==
At the same time the album was released, the group also released a single on an 8 cm CD entitled "The Blue Hearts Hit! Hit! Hit!." The five songs in the medley were "Linda Linda", "Hito ni Yasashiku", "Yume", "Train-Train" and "Jōnetsu no Bara".

== Tracks ==
1. "Dance Number" (ダンス・ナンバー Dansu Nanbaa) (No-Tech Mix)
2. "Chernobyl" (チェルノブイリ Cherunobuiri) (Hyper-Drived Mix)
3. "Train-Train" (TRAIN-TRAIN) (Ready-Made Mix)
4. "Aozora" (青空 Blue Sky) (Blue Bus Mix)
5. "Jōnetsu no Bara" (情熱の薔薇 Rose of Passion) (Jyonetsu'No'Mix)
6. "Yūgure" (夕暮れ Twilight) (House Mix)
7. "Yume" (夢 Dreams) (Ragga Harp Mix)
8. "Kiss Shite Hoshii" (キスしてほしい I Want a Kiss) (Sleepless Mix)
9. "Linda Linda" (リンダリンダ) (Post Historic Monster Dub Mix)
10. "Shōnen no Uta" (少年の詩 A Boy's Song) (Japanese Psycho Mix)
11. "Hito ni Yasashiku" (人にやさしく Be Kind to People) (British Mixture Rock Mix)
12. "Jōnetsu no Bara" (情熱の薔薇 Rose of Passion) (Acid Funk Mix)
13. "Dance Number" (ダンス・ナンバー Dansu Nanbaa) (Hage Mix)
14. "Yume no Eki" (夢の駅 Dream Station) (Dub Master X-in Dub)
