= East West Side Story =

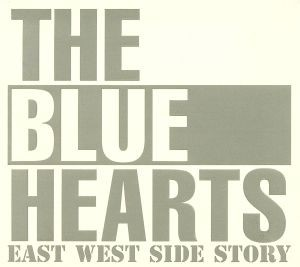

Compilation album by The Blue Hearts
- Released: September 26, 1995
- Genre: Punk rock
- Length: 1h52m (Disc 1 only); 2h27m (incl. Disc 2)
- Language: Japanese
- Label: East West Japan
- Producer: The Blue Hearts

East West Side Story was the second compilation album released by the Japanese band The Blue Hearts. It includes many of their hits from their time with the East West Japan label. All of the band's hits from their times with the Meldac Records label can be found on Super Best, their third compilation album.

== Track listing ==
The first disc in this set is a compilation of the band's greatest hits from their time with East West Japan, while the second disc is a compilation of songs taken from concert performances between 1991 and 1994.

=== Disc 1 ===
1. "Jōnetsu no Bara" (情熱の薔薇 Rose of Passion)
2. "Kubitsuri-dai Kara" (首吊り台から From the Hangman's Block)
3. "Ano Ko ni Touch" (あの娘にタッチ Touch That Girl)
4. "Too Much Pain" (TOO MUCH PAIN)
5. "Yume" (夢 Dreams)
6. "Tabibito" (旅人 Travelers)
7. "Taifū" (台風 Typhoon)
8. "1000 no Violin" (1000のバイオリン 1000 Violins)
9. "Party" (パーティー Paatii)
10. "Yūgure" (夕暮れ Twilight)
11. "Yoru no Tōzokudan" (夜の盗賊団 Night Thieves) (alternative version)
12. "1001 no Violin" (1001のバイオリン 1001 Violins)
13. "Too Much Pain" (re-mix version)

=== Disc 2 ===
1. "Waa Waa" (わーわー) (live version)
2. "Minagoroshi no Melody" (皆殺しのメロディ Massacre Melody) (live version)
3. "Tokyo Zombie" (東京ゾンビ) (live version)
4. "Sutegoma" (すてごま Sacrifice (live version)
5. "Ore wa Ore no Shi o Shinitai" (俺は俺の死を死にたい I Want to Die My Death) (alternative version)
6. * "Mirai wa Bokura no Te no Naka" (未来は僕等の手の中 The Future is in Our Hands)
7. * "Bakudan ga Okkochiru Toki" (爆弾が落っこちる時 When the Bombs Fall)
8. * "Roku de Nashi" (ロクデナシ Bastard)
9. * "No No No" (NO NO NO)
10. * "Fūsen Bakudan" (風船爆弾 Paper Balloon Bomb)
11. * "Hammer" (ハンマー Hammaa)
12. * "Hito ni Yasashiku" (人にやさしく Be Kind to People)
13. * "Dance Number" (ダンス・ナンバー Dansu Nambaa)
14. "Navigator" (ナビゲーター Nabigeetaa) (live version)

*Tracks 6–13 are a continuous live medley.
