= Singles 1990–1993 =

Singles 1990-1993

Compilation album by The Blue Hearts
- Released: November 25, 1999
- Genre: Punk rock
- Language: Japanese
- Label: East West Japan
- Producer: The Blue Hearts

Singles 1990–1993 is the most recent compilation album released by the Japanese band The Blue Hearts. It is a two disc set that contains many of the singles and their B-side tracks that were released between 1990 and 1993. It also includes live versions of some of the singles, as well as previously unreleased songs.

== Track listing ==
=== Disc One ===
1. "Jōnetsu no Bara" (情熱の薔薇 Rose of Passion)
2. "Teppō" (鉄砲 Gun)
3. "Kubitsuri-dai Kara" (首吊り台から From the Hangman's Block)
4. "Cinderella" (シンデレラ Shinderera)
5. "Ano Ko ni Touch" (あの娘にタッチ Touch That Girl)
6. "Waa Waa" (わーわー)
7. "Too Much Pain" (トゥ・マッチ・ペイン Tu Matchi Pein)
8. "Nakanaide Koibito Yo" (泣かないで恋人よ Don't Cry, Lover)
9. "Yume" (夢 Dreams)
10. "Minagoroshi no Melody" (皆殺しのメロディー Massacre Melody)
11. "Tokyo Zombie" (東京ゾンビ)

=== Disc Two ===
1. "Tabibito" (旅人 Travelers)
2. "Taifū" (台風 Typhoon)
3. "1000 no Violin" (1000のバイオリン 1000 Violins)
4. "Ore wa Ore no Shi o Shinitai" (俺は俺の死を死にたい I Want to Die My Death)
5. "1001 no Violin" (1001のバイオリン 1001 Violins)
6. "Party" (パーティー Paatii)
7. "Chance" (チャンス Chansu)
8. "Yūgure" (夕暮れ Twilight)
9. "Sutegoma" (すてごま Sacrifice)
10. "Yoru no Tōzokudan" (夜の盗賊団 Night Thieves)
