= Live All Sold Out =

Live album by The Blue Hearts
- Released: January 1, 1996
- Genre: Rock
- Length: 73m
- Language: Japanese
- Label: East West Japan
- Producer: The Blue Hearts

Live All Sold Out was the first live album released by the Japanese band The Blue Hearts. It contains 20 of their hits and was released by their label, East West Japan.

== Track listing ==
1. "Hito ni Yasashiku" (人にやさしく Be Kind to People)
2. "Hammer" (ハンマー Hammaa)
3. "Linda Linda" (リンダリンダ Rinda Rinda)
4. "Sekai no Mannaka" (世界のまん中 Middle of the World)
5. "Romantic" (ロマンチック)
6. "Aozora" (青空 Blue Sky)
7. "Blues o Ketobase" (ブルースをけとばせ Kick the Blues)
8. "Kiss Shite Hoshii" (キスしてほしい I Want a Kiss)
9. "Owaranai Uta" (終わらない歌 An Endless Song)
10. "Tegami" (手紙 Letter)
11. "Mayonaka no Telephone" (真夜中のテレフォン Telephone in the Night)
12. "Image" (イメージ)
13. "Jōnetsu no Bara" (情熱の薔薇 Rose of Passion)
14. "Yume" (夢 Dreams)
15. "Nakanaide Koibito Yo" (泣かないで恋人よ Don't Cry, Lover)
16. "Tsuki no Bakudanki" (月の爆撃機 Moon's Bomb)
17. "1000 no Violin" (1000のバイオリン 1000 Violins)
18. "Train-Train" (TRAIN-TRAIN)
19. "Mirai wa Bokura no Te no Naka" (未来は僕等の手の中 The Future is in Our Hands)
20. "Blue Hearts Theme" (ブルーハーツのテーマ Buruu Haatsu no Teema)
