= Yaon Live on '94 6.18/19 =

Live album by The Blue Hearts
- Released: November 25, 1997
- Genre: Rock
- Language: Japanese
- Label: East West Japan
- Producer: The Blue Hearts

Yaon Live on '94 6.18/19 was the second live album released by the Japanese band The Blue Hearts. It contains 17 of their hits and was released by their label, East West Japan.

== Track listing ==
1. "Sutegoma" (すてごま Sacrifice)
2. "Yume" (夢 Dreams)
3. "Yaru ka Nigeru ka" (やるか逃げるか Do It or Go Away)
4. "Tabibito" (旅人 Travelers)
5. "Love Letter" (ラブレター Rabu Retaa)
6. "Yūgure" (夕暮れ Twilight)
7. "Ore wa Ore no Shi o Shinitai" (俺は俺の死を死にたい I Want to Die My Death)
8. "Shōnen no Uta" (少年の詩 A Boy's Song)
9. "Boku no Migite" (僕の右手 My Right Hand)
10. "Midori no Happa" (緑のハッパ Midori no Happa)
11. "Aozora" (青空 Blue Sky)
12. "Tsuki no Bakugekiki" (月の爆撃機 Moon's Bomb)
13. "1000 no Violin" (1000のバイオリン 1000 Violins)
14. "Medley" (メドレー Medoree)
15. "Jōnetsu no Bara" (情熱の薔薇 Rose of Passion)
16. "Linda Linda" (リンダリンダ Rinda Rinda)
17. "Train-Train" (TRAIN-TRAIN)
