= The Blue Hearts no Dekoboko Chindōchū =

The Blue Hearts no Dekoboko Chindōchū ザ・ブルーハーツの凸凹珍道中
- DVD cover

Video by The Blue Hearts
- Released: July 10, 1995 (VHS); June 7, 2006 (DVD)
- Genre: Rock
- Length: 1h45m
- Language: Japanese
- Label: East West Japan Records
- Producer: The Blue Hearts

The Blue Hearts no Dekoboko Chindōchū (ザ・ブルーハーツの凸凹珍道中) was a compilation video album released by the Japanese band The Blue Hearts. The video was a documentary to the band's final tour of Japan in 1994 and includes recordings from 15 of the 30 venues.

== Chapter listing ==
1. Opening
2. "Tegami"
3. "Party"
4. "Midori no Happa"
5. "King of Rookie"
6. "Yoru no Tōzokudan"
7. "Yūgure"
8. Medley ("Ame Agari", "Muchi to Manto", "Takaramono", "Toshi o Torō", "Torch Song")
9. "Chance"
10. "Sutegoma"
11. "Yume"
12. "Tabibito"
13. "Inspiration"
14. "Taifū"
15. "Ore wa Ore no Shi o Shinitai"
16. "Yaru ka Nigeru ka"
17. "Tsuki no Bakugekiki"
18. "1000 no Violin"
19. Medley ("Mirai wa Bokura no Te no Naka", "Bakudan ga Okkochiru Toki", "Roku de Nashi", "No No No", "Fūsen Bakudan", "Hammer", "Hito ni Yasashiku", "Dance Number")
20. "Linda Linda"
21. "Train-Train"
