= Super Best (The Blue Hearts album) =

Compilation album by The Blue Hearts
- Released: October 16, 1995
- Recorded: 1985–1989
- Genre: Punk rock
- Length: 71:00
- Language: Japanese
- Label: Meldac Records
- Producer: The Blue Hearts

The Blue Hearts chronology
East West Side Story (1995)	Super Best (1995)	The Blue Hearts Box (1999)

Super Best was the compilation album by the Japanese band The Blue Hearts.

== Album ==
This retrospective is composed of their early efforts released by Meldac Records between 1987 and 1989. It also features two rarities that had not been issued on CD — "Blue Hearts Yori Ai o Komete", the song appeared on the video The Blue Hearts Live!, and "1985", the track taken from an independently produced soundsheet which was sold at their concert before they made a contract with the record label.

== Release ==
Super Best came out a month after the release of East West Side Story, another compilation which comprises materials after they moved to EastWest Japan.

== Reception ==
The record peaked at number-four on the Japanese Oricon chart upon its release, and it re-entered there after string of their songs were featured on the TV-drama Hito ni Yasashiku aired by Fuji Television in 2002. From that year onwards, the album have remained on the top-300 of the chart for over 200 weeks. Super Best was certified double platinum by the Recording Industry Association of Japan in November 2002, for shipments of over 800,000 copies.

== Track listing ==
No.	Title	Writer(s)	Length
1.	"Linda Linda (リンダリンダ)"	Hiroto Kōmoto	3:13
2.	"Hito ni Yasashiku (人にやさしく)"	Kōmoto	3:16
3.	"Sha La La (シャララ)"	Kōmoto	4:03
4.	"Rokudenashi (ロクデナシ)"	Masatoshi Mashima	3:18
5.	"Love Letter (ラブレター)"	Kōmoto	3:28
6.	"Heisei no Blues (平成のブルース)"	Mashima	9:57
7.	"Kiss Shite Hoshii (キスしてほしい)"	Kōmoto	3:15
8.	"Hammer (ハンマー)"	Mashima	2:04
9.	"Chain Gang (チェインギャング)"	Mashima	5:58
10.	"Train-Train"	Mashima	3:48
11.	"Line o Koete (ラインを越えて)"	Mashima	6:39
12.	"Boku wa Koko ni Tatteiru yo (僕はここに立っているよ)"	Mashima	3:39
13.	"Eiyū ni Akogarete (英雄にあこがれて)"	Kōmoto	3:49
14.	"Aozora (青空)"	Mashima	4:47
15.	"Owaranai Uta (終わらない歌)"	Mashima	3:04
16.	"Blue Hearts Yori Ai o Komete (ブルーハーツより愛をこめて)" (Live version; previously unreleased)	Kōmoto	2:10
17.	"1985"	Kōmoto	3:24
Total length:			71:00

== Charts ==
=== Weekly charts ===
Chart	Peak position
Japanese Oricon Albums Chart	4

I’m

=== Year-end charts ===
Year	Chart	Position
1995	Japanese Albums Chart	126
2002	Japanese Albums Chart	110
2003	Japanese Albums Chart	305
2004	Japanese Albums Chart	524
2005	Japanese Albums Chart	336
2006	Japanese Albums Chart	239
2007	Japanese Albums Chart	263

=== Certifications ===
Region	Certification
Japan (RIAJ)	2× Platinum
