= Blue Hearts no Video + Maboroshi no Video Fukkokuban =

Video by The Blue Hearts
- Released: May 26, 2004 (DVD)
- Genre: Rock
- Length: 28m
- Language: Japanese
- Label: Meldac Records
- Producer: The Blue Hearts

Blue Hearts no Video + Maboroshi no Video Fukkokuban (ブルーハーツのビデオ＋幻のビデオ復刻版, Blue Hearts' Video and the Phantom Video Rerelease) was a compilation video album released by the Japanese band The Blue Hearts. The DVD features the original recordings of the band's first two non-live videos, The Blue Hearts and Blue Hearts no Video - Video Clip 1987-1989. The two videos had previously been released on VHS in 1987 and 1990, respectively, but had not yet been released on DVD.

== Recording ==
The original VHS versions of both videos are included on this DVD and neither the images nor the sounds have been edited. It also includes a 10-minute documentary portion that was filmed with only one camera, not allowing for retakes.

== Chapter listing ==
=== Blue Hearts no Video - Video Clip 1987-1989 ===
1. Opening ("Hito ni Yasashiku" and a slideshow)
2. "Train-Train"
3. "Love Letter"
4. "Kiss Shite Hoshii" (anime version)
5. "Aozora" (live version recorded on June 10, 1989)
6. Ending ("Linda Linda")

=== The Blue Hearts ===
1. Opening
2. "Bakudan ga Okkochiru Toki"
3. "No No No"
4. "Linda Linda"
5. Ending
