= List of B-side compilation albums =

This is a list of B-side collections. It does not include remix albums.

- Adam Ant – B-Side Babies (1994)
- Alanis Morissette – Feast on Scraps (2004)
- As It Is (band) – A Decade Uneventful (2024)
- Avril Lavigne – B-Sides (2001)
- Alkaline Trio – Alkaline Trio (2000)
- Alkaline Trio – Remains (2007)
- Anberlin – Lost Songs (2007)
- Anthrax – Attack of the Killer B's (1991)
- The Aquabats – Myths, Legends, and Other Amazing Adventures, Vol. 2 (2000)
- Ash – Cosmic Debris (2002)
- Avenged Sevenfold – Diamonds in the Rough (2008)
- Beach House - B-Sides and Rarities (2017)
- Beck – Stray Blues (2000)
- Bee Gees – Rarities (1989)
- Biffy Clyro – Lonely Revolutions (Limited copies released exclusively on the band's website) (2010)
- Big Country – Restless Natives & Rarities (1998), the other seven "Rarities" discs.
- The Blue Hearts - The Blue Hearts (1990)
- The Blue Hearts - Blast Off! (1991)
- The Blue Hearts - Meet the Blue Hearts (1995) (compilation of both The Blue Hearts (1990) and Blast Off!)
- The Blue Hearts - East West Side Story (1995)
- The Blue Hearts - Super Best (1995)
- The Blue Hearts - Singles 1990-1993 (1999)
- Blur – The Special Collectors Edition (1994)
- Bon Jovi – 100,000,000 Bon Jovi Fans Can't Be Wrong (2004)
- Bouncing Souls – The Bad the Worse and the Out of Print (2002)
- Broken Social Scene – Bee Hives (2003)
- The Cardigans – The Other Side of the Moon (1997)
- Carly Rae Jepsen – Dedicated Side B (2020)
- Carly Rae Jepsen – Emotion: Side B (2016)
- The Charlatans – Songs From The Other Side (2002)
- The Chemical Brothers – B-Sides Volume 1 (2007)
- The Clash – Black Market Clash (1993)
- Cliff Richard – Rare 'B' Sides 1963–1989 (2009)
- Coldplay – A Rush of B-Sides To Your Head, Castles (both are actually widespread bootlegs, not official albums)
- Crowded House – Afterglow (1999)
- The Cure – Join the Dots: B-Sides & Rarities, 1978–2001 [Box set] (2004)
- Damien Rice – B-Sides (2004)
- Death From Above 1979 – Romance Bloody Romance: Remixes & B-Sides (2005)
- Def Leppard – Retro Active (1993)
- Deftones – B-Sides & Rarities (2005)
- Del Amitri – Lousy With Love
- Depeche Mode – B-Sides & Instrumentals (a widespread bootleg from 1999)
- D'espairsRay – Antique (2011)
- Die Ärzte - Bäst of (2006)
- Disturbed – The Lost Children (2011)
- Do As Infinity – Do the B-Side (2004)
- Doves – Lost Sides (2003)
- Dropkick Murphys – The Singles Collection, Volume 1 (2000)
- Dropkick Murphys – Singles Collection, Volume 2 (2005)
- Eels – B-Sides & Rarities 1996–2003 (2005) (an iTunes Music Store Collection)
- Eels – Useless Trinkets: B-Sides, Soundtracks, Rarities and Unreleased 1996–2006 (2008)
- Elastic No-No Band – No-No's (Leftovers and Live Songs)
- Elbow – Dead In The Boot
- Emilie Autumn – A Bit o' This & That (2007)
- Embrace – Dry Kids: B-Sides 1997–2005 (2005)
- The Fall – 458489 B-sides (1990)
- Feeder – Another Yesterday (2000)
- Feeder – Picture Of Perfect Youth (2004)
- Five Iron Frenzy – Cheeses...(of Nazareth) (2003)
- Florence + the Machine – The B-Sides
- Foo Fighters – Five Songs And A Cover (2005)
- Fountains of Wayne – Out of State Plates (2005)
- Frankenstein Drag Queens From Planet 13 – Rare Treats (unofficial)
- Genesis – Genesis Archive 1 (1998)
- Genesis – Genesis Archive 2 (2000)
- Gorillaz – D-Sides (2007)
- Gorillaz – G-Sides (2001)
- Green Day – Shenanigans (2002)
- Hitomi – HTM ~TIARTROP FLES~ (2003)
- Hole – My Body, The Hand Grenade (1997)
- Hunters & Collectors – Mutations (2005)
- Ice Cube – Bootlegs & B-Sides (1994)
- Iron Maiden – Best of the B'Sides (2002)
- James – Ultra (2001)
- Jars of Clay – The White Elephant Sessions (1999)
- The Jesus and Mary Chain – Barbed Wire Kisses (1988)
- The Jesus and Mary Chain – The Sound of Speed (1993)
- The Jesus and Mary Chain – Hate Rock 'N' Roll (1995)
- Judas Priest – Priest, Live and Rare (1998)
- Elton John – Rare Masters (1992)
- Kate Bush – This Woman's Work: Anthology 1978–1990 (1990)
- Kent – B-sidor 95–00 (2000)
- The Killers – Sawdust (2007)
- The Kooks – All over town (2008) (Konk, after "Tick of time")
- Kydd – Anunnaki (2013)
- L'Arc-en-Ciel – The Best of L'Arc-en-Ciel C/W (2003)
- The Lawrence Arms – Cocktails & Dreams (2005)
- Less Than Jake – B is for B-Sides (2004)
- Madness - I Do Like to Be B-Side the A-Side (2018)
- Madness - I Do Like to Be B-Side the A-Side Volume 2 (2021)
- Madness - I Do Like to Be B-Side the A-Side Volume 3 (2023)
- Mae – Destination: B-Sides (2004)
- Manic Street Preachers – Lipstick Traces (2003)
- Marillion – B'Sides Themselves (1988)
- Maroon 5 – The B-Side Collection (2007)
- Matthew Good Band – Lo-Fi B-Sides (1997)
- Maxïmo Park – Missing Songs (2005)
- Metallica – Garage Inc. (1998)
- The Mighty Mighty Bosstones – Medium Rare
- Moby – Rare: The Collected B-Sides 1989–1993 (1996)
- Moby – Play: The B Sides (2001)
- Moby – 18 B-Sides (2004) (most of the b-sides from album 18)
- Modest Mouse – Building Nothing Out of Something
- Modest Mouse – No One's First and You're Next
- Morning Musume – Morning Musume Zen Singles Coupling Collection
- Morphine – B-Sides and Otherwise (1997)
- Mr. Children – B-Side (2007)
- Mucc – Coupling Worst (2009)
- Mucc – Worst of MUCC (2007)
- Muse – Hullabaloo Soundtrack (2001)
- Eminem – Music to Be Murdered By (2020)
- MxPx – Let It Happen
- MxPx – Let's Rock
- My Chemical Romance – Live and Rare (2007)
- My Chemical Romance – The Black Parade: The B-Sides (2009)
- The National – The Virginia EP (2008)
- Nena – Maxis & Mixes
- Nena – Einmal ist Keinmal
- Nick Cave and the Bad Seeds – B-Sides & Rarities (2005)
- Nick Cave and the Bad Seeds – B-Sides & Rarities Part II (2021)
- Nirvana – Incesticide (1992)
- Nirvana – With the Lights Out [Box set] (2004)
- NOFX – 45 or 46 Songs That Weren't Good Enough to Go on Our Other Records (2002)
- No Doubt – Everything in Time (2004)
- No Use for a Name – Rarities Vol. I: The Covers (2017)
- No Use for a Name – Rarities Vol. 2: The Originals (2021)
- Oasis – The Masterplan (1998)
- Ocean Colour Scene – B-sides, Seasides and Freerides (1997)
- Orchestral Manoeuvres in the Dark – Navigation: The OMD B-Sides (2001)
- Over the Rhine – Besides (1997)
- Paramore – The Summer Tic (2006)
- Pearl Jam – Lost Dogs (2003)
- Pet Shop Boys – Alternative (1995)
- Pet Shop Boys – Format (2012)
- Pierrot – Dictators Circus -a deformed BUD- (2005)
- The Pillows – Another morning, Another pillows (2002)
- Pink Floyd – Relics (1971; 1996)
- Pixies – Complete 'B' Sides (2001)
- Porcupine Tree – Recordings (2001)
- Prince – The Hits/The B-Sides (1993)
- Queens Of The Stone Age – The Definitive Collection Of B-Sides & Rarities (2007)
- Radiohead - Airbag/How Am I Driving? (1998)
- Radiohead – In Rainbows (Disk 2) (2007)
- Rancid – B Sides and C Sides (2008)
- Relient K – The Bird and the Bee Sides (2008)
- R.E.M. – Dead Letter Office (1987)
- R.E.M. – In Time: The Best of R.E.M. 1988–2003, Disc 2: Rarities and B-Sides (2003)
- Red Hot Chili Peppers – I'm With You Sessions (2012–2013) - I'm Beside You (2013)
- Rise Against – Long Forgotten Songs: B-Sides & Covers (2000–2013) (2013)
- Roxette – Rarities (1995)
- Rumer - B Sides and Rarities (2015)
- Sakanaction - Tsuki no Namigata: Coupling & Unreleased Works (2015)
- Sarah McLachlan – Rarities, B-Sides and Other Stuff (1996) and Rarities, B-Sides and Other Stuff Volume 2 (2008)
- Scandal - Encore Show (2013)
- Scaterd Few – Out of the Attic (1994)
- Shai Hulud – A Comprehensive Retrospective: or How We Learned to Stop Worrying and Release Bad and Useless Recordings (1996)
- Shihad – B-Sides (1996)
- Shonen Knife – The Birds & the B-Sides (1996)
- Siouxsie and the Banshees – Downside Up (2004)
- Sister Hazel – BAM! Volume 1 (2007)
- Skid Row – B-Side Ourselves (1992)
- Skinny Puppy – B-Sides Collect (1999)
- Sky Ferreira - Night Time, My Time: B-Sides Part 1 (2013)
- The Smashing Pumpkins – Pisces Iscariot (1994)
- The Smashing Pumpkins – Judas O (2001) (limited edition bonus CD to Rotten Apples; a collection of B-sides meant to "sequel" Pisces Iscariot)
- The Smashing Pumpkins – Rarities and B-Sides (2005)
- The Smithereens – Attack of the Smithereens (1995)
- Soilwork – Death Resonance (2016)
- Something for Kate – Phantom Limbs – Selected B Sides (2004)
- Sonic Youth – The Destroyed Room: B-sides and Rarities
- Soundgarden – Echo of Miles: Scattered Tracks Across the Path (2014)
- Space - Invasion of the Spiders (1997)
- The Stone Roses - The Complete Stone Roses (1995)
- Strangelove – One Up: The B-Sides (2008)
- Strung Out - Prototypes and Painkillers (2009)
- Suede – Sci-Fi Lullabies (1997)
- Superfly - Coupling Songs: 'Side B' (2015)
- Swollen Members – Monsters In The Closet (2002)
- Talk Talk – Asides Besides (1997)
- Tears for Fears – Saturnine Martial & Lunatic (1996)
- They Might Be Giants – Miscellaneous T (1991)
- Thom Yorke – Spitting Feathers
- U2 – Medium, Rare & Remastered (2009)
- Ultravox – Rare, Vol. 1
- Ultravox – Rare, Vol. 2
- The Verve – No Come Down (1994)
- Toad the Wet Sprocket – In Light Syrup (1995)
- Weezer – B-Sides And Rarities (1994) (which is actually a widespread bootleg, not an official album)
- We Are Scientists – Crap Attack (2006)
- Robbie Williams - Under the Radar Volume 1 (2014)
- Robbie Williams - Under the Radar Volume 2 (2017)
- Robbie Williams - Under the Radar Volume 3 (2019)
- The Who – Who's Missing (1985)
- XTC – Beeswax: Some B-Sides 1977–1982 (1982)
- Yellow Magic Orchestra - UC YMO: Ultimate Collection of Yellow Magic Orchestra (2003)
- Yui – My Short Stories (2008)
- Zone – ura E~Complete B side Melodies~ (2006)

== Albums featuring extensive B-sides ==
- Tori Amos – A Piano: The Collection (2006)
- Ash – Intergalactic Sonic 7s (incl Bonus CD Cosmic Debris) (2002)
- Aslan – The Platinum Collection (2005)
- The Beatles - Past Masters (1988)
- The Beautiful South – Carry on up the Charts (Limited Edition) (1994)
- The Blue Hearts - All Time Singles ~Super Premium Best~ (2010)
- Belle and Sebastian – Push Barman to Open Old Wounds (2005)
- Björk – Family Tree (box set) (2002)
- Blur – Bustin' + Dronin' (1998)
- Buckcherry – Buckcherry (Special Edition) (2006)
- Catherine Wheel – Like Cats and Dogs (1996)
- The Clash – Super Black Market Clash (released 1993)
- Elvis Costello and the Attractions – Taking Liberties (1980), also Ten Bloody Marys & Ten How's Your Fathers (similar UK release)
- Cowboy Junkies – Rarities, B-Sides and Slow, Sad Waltzes (1999)
- The Fiery Furnaces – EP (2005)
- The Frank and Walters – Souvenirs (2005)
- Genesis – Genesis Archive 2: 1976–1992 (2000)
- Green Day – Shenanigans (2002)
- The Hollies - The Other Side Of The Hollies (1978). One track, 'I've Got A Way Of My Own' had previously appeared on a Hollies official, studio-album release.
- The Jam – Extras (1993)
- Jawbreaker - Etc. (2002)
- Billy Joel – My Lives (2005)
- Korn – See You on the Other Side (Deluxe Edition) (2005)
- Avril Lavigne – B-Sides (2002)
- 10,000 Maniacs – Campfire Songs: The Popular, Obscure and Unknown Recordings (2004)
- Mansun – Kleptomania (2004)
- Marillion – B'Sides Themselves (1988)
- Sarah McLachlan – Rarities, B-Sides and Other Stuff (1996)
- Megadeth – The reissues of their first eight albums. (2006)
- Natalie Merchant – Retrospective: 1995–2005 (2005)
- Morrissey – Bona Drag (1990)
- Morrissey – World of Morrissey (1995)
- Morrissey – My Early Burglary Years (1998)
- Morrissey – You Are the Quarry: Deluxe Edition (2004)
- New Order – Substance (1987)
- Nine Inch Nails – The Downward Spiral: Deluxe Edition (2004)
- Tom Petty and the Heartbreakers – Playback (1995)
- Pavement – Slanted and Enchanted: Luxe & Reduxe (2002)
- Pavement – Crooked Rain, Crooked Rain: LA's Desert Origins (2004)
- Pavement – Wowee Zowee: Sordid Sentinels Edition (2006)
- Pavement – Brighten the Corners: Nicene Creedence Edition (2008)
- The Pillows - Lostman Go to Yesterday (2007) (comprising all their singles from 1994 to 2005 during their time with King Records from Daydream Wonder, up to The Third Eye (サード アイ))
- Prince – The Hits/The B-Sides (1993)
- Radiohead - OK Computer OKNOTOK 1997 2017 (2017)
- R.E.M. – In Time: The Best of R.E.M. 1988–2003 (2003), a bonus CD was included with the band's best of album that included B-Sides & other rare tracks.
- The Replacements – All for Nothing / Nothing for All (1997)
- Slipknot – Slipknot (Digipak) (2000)
- The Shadows – The Complete Singles As and Bs 1959–1979 (4-CD set)
- The Smiths – Hatful of Hollow (1984)
- The Smiths – The World Won't Listen (1987)
- The Smiths – Louder Than Bombs (1987)
- Static-X – Beneath... Between... Beyond... (2004)
- Steps – The Last Dance (2002)
- The Stone Roses - Turns into Stone (1992)
- Super Furry Animals – Out Spaced (1998)
- KT Tunstall – KT Tunstall's Acoustic Extravaganza (2006)
- U2 – The Best of 1980–1990: Limited Edition (1998)
- U2 – The Best of 1990–2000: Limited Edition (2002)
- Ween – The Brown Sides (2008; 2014)
- Weezer – Weezer - Deluxe Edition (2004)
- XTC – Rag and Bone Buffet: Rare Cuts and Leftovers (1990)

== See also ==
- B-Sides, several albums
- B-Sides and Rarities, several albums
- Lists of albums
