= The Blue Hearts Box =

Box set by The Blue Hearts
- Released: January 1, 1999
- Genre: Rock
- Language: Japanese
- Label: Meldac Records
- Producer: The Blue Hearts

The Blue Hearts Box was a box set of three early albums released by the Japanese band The Blue Hearts in 1999. It contains the three Blue Hearts' albums that were released by Meldac Records: The Blue Hearts, Young and Pretty and Train-Train. The release included a 100-page booklet documenting their early albums and only 50,000 of the boxed sets were produced.

== Track listing ==
=== Disc 1: The Blue Hearts ===
1. "Mirai wa Bokura no Te no Naka" (未来は僕等の手の中 The Future is in Our Hands) (2:25)
2. "Owaranai Uta" (終わらない歌 An Endless Song) (3:04)
3. "No No No" (NO NO NO) (2:26)
4. "Punk Rock" (パンク・ロック Panku Rokku) (3:41)
5. "Machi" (街 Town) (3:18)
6. "Shōnen no Uta" (少年の詩 A Boy's Song) (2:41)
7. "Bakudan ga Okkochiru Toki" (爆弾が落っこちる時 When the Bombs Fall) (2:06)
8. "Sekai no Mannaka" (世界のまん中 Middle of the World) (2:20)
9. "Hadaka no Ō-sama" (裸の王様 The Naked Emperor) (2:50)
10. "Dance Number" (ダンス・ナンバー Dansu Nanbaa) (1:28)
11. "Kimi no Tame" (君のため For You) (4:18)
12. "Linda Linda" (リンダリンダ) (3:22)

=== Disc 2: Young and Pretty ===
1. "Kiss Shite Hoshii" (キスしてほしい I Want a Kiss) (3:15)
2. "Roku de Nashi II" (ロクデナシII Good-for-nothing II (2:15)
3. "Scrap" (スクラップ) (2:40)
4. "Roku de Nashi" (ロクデナシ Good-for-nothing) (3:18)
5. "Romantic" (ロマンチック) (3:50)
6. "Line o Koete" (ラインを越えて Cross the Line) (6:40)
7. "Chewing Gum o Kaminagara" (チューインガムをかみながら While Chewing Gum) (2:43)
8. "Tōku Made" (遠くまで Faraway) (3:21)
9. "Hoshi o Kudasai" (星をください Please Give Me a Star) (3:01)
10. "Restaurant" (レストラン) (3:02)
11. "Eiyū ni Akogarete" (英雄にあこがれて Admiring the Hero) (3:50)
12. "Chain Gang" (チェインギャング) (5:58)

=== Disc 3: Train-Train ===
1. "Train-Train" (TRAIN-TRAIN)
2. "Merry Go Round" (メリーゴーランド)
3. "Denkō Sekka" (電光石火 The Thunderbolt)
4. "Missile" (ミサイル)
5. "Boku no Migite" (僕の右手 My Right Hand)
6. "Mugon Denwa no Burūsu" (無言電話のブルース Silent Telephone Blues)
7. "Fūsen Bakudan" (風船爆弾 Paper Balloon Bomb)
8. "Love Letter" (ラブレター)
9. "Nagaremono" (ながれもの Wanderer)
10. "Burūsu o Ketobase" (ブルースをけとばせ Kick the Blues)
11. "Aozora" (青空 Blue Sky)
12. "Omae o Hanasanai" (お前を離さない I Won't Leave You)
