= Meet the Blue Hearts =

Compilation album by The Blue Hearts
- Released: January 1, 1995
- Genre: Punk rock
- Language: Japanese
- Label: Meldac Records
- Producer: The Blue Hearts

Meet the Blue Hearts was the first compilation album released by the Japanese band The Blue Hearts. It includes many of their hits from their time with the Meldac Records label and live records from their tour of America.

== Track listing ==
=== Disc 1 ===
1. "Kiss Shite Hoshii" (キスしてほしい I Want a Kiss)
2. "Scrap" (スクラップ Sukurappu)
3. "No No No" (NO NO NO)
4. "Dance Number" (ダンス・ナンバー Dansu Nambaa)
5. "Linda Linda" (リンダリンダ Rinda Rinda)
6. "Hito ni Yasashiku" (人にやさしく Be Kind to People)
7. "Boku no Migite" (僕の右手 My Right Hand) (USA live version)
8. "Hammer" (ハンマー Hammaa) (USA live version)

=== Disc 2 ===
1. "Mirai wa Bokura no Te no Naka" (未来は僕等の手の中 The Future is in Our Hands)
2. "Bakudan ga Okkochiru Toki" (爆弾が落っこちる時 When the Bombs Fall)
3. "Owaranai Uta" (終わらない歌 An Endless Song)
4. "Shōnen no Uta" (少年の詩 A Boy's Song)
5. "Chernobyl" (チェルノブイリ Cherunobuiri)
6. "Aozora" (青空 Blue Sky)
7. "Train-Train" (TRAIN-TRAIN)
8. "Fūsen Bakudan" (風船爆弾 Paper Balloon Bomb)
9. "Denkō Sekka" (電光石火 The Thunderbolt)
10. "Blues o Ketobase" (ブルースをけとばせ Kick the Blues)
11. "Love Letter" (ラブレター Rabu Retaa)
12. "Blue Hearts Theme" (ブルーハーツのテーマ Buruu Haatsu no Teema)
