= Blast Off! (The Blue Hearts album) =

Compilation album by The Blue Hearts
- Released: 1991
- Genre: Punk rock
- Length: 38:25
- Language: Japanese
- Label: Juggler Records
- Producer: The Blue Hearts

Professional ratings
Review scores
Source	Rating
Allmusic	3/5 stars

Blast Off! was the second American release (the first being the self-titled 6-song EP) by the Japanese punk rock band The Blue Hearts. It was released in 1991 and only in America. Though each of the songs was recorded with the original Japanese lyrics, the CD jacket included English translations of each of the songs.

== Tracks ==
The Blue Hearts' previous American release, the self-titled CD/12" vinyl EP, was a 6-song compilation with selections from their self-titled first album, The Blue Hearts, and their second album, Young and Pretty. As with their first American release, this album was also a compilation of songs: this time from their first album and their third, Train-Train. The first four songs were from The Blue Hearts and the rest were from Train-Train, except for "Chernobyl" and "The Blue Hearts Theme", which had only been released as singles in Japan. The original Japanese title of the songs is in parentheses.

No.	Title	Length
1.	"The Future is in Our Hands (未来は僕等の手の中 Mirai wa Bokura no Te no Naka)"	2:28
2.	"When the Bombs Fall (爆弾が落っこちる時 Bakudan ga Okkochiru Toki)"	2:09
3.	"An Endless Song (終わらない歌 Owaranai Uta)"	3:06
4.	"A Boy's Song (少年の詩 Shōnen no Uta)"	2:43
5.	"Chernobyl (チェルノブイリ Cherunobuiri)"	3:09
6.	"Aozora (青空 Aozora)"	4:49
7.	"Train-Train (TRAIN-TRAIN)"	3:50
8.	"Paper Balloon Bomb (風船爆弾 Fūsen Bakudan)"	2:58
9.	"The Thunderbolt (電光石火 Denkō Sekka)"	2:49
10.	"Kick the Blues (ブルースをけとばせ Burūsu o Ketobase)"	4:46
11.	"Love Letter (ラブレター Rabu Retaa)"	3:30
12.	"The Blue Hearts Theme (ブルーハーツのテーマ Burū Haatsu no Teema)"	2:08
Total length:		38:25
