= Zen-Nippon East Waste Tour '91 =

Video by The Blue Hearts
- Released: September 10, 1991 (VHS)
- Recorded: NHK Hall
- Genre: Rock
- Length: 60m
- Language: Japanese
- Label: East West Japan
- Producer: The Blue Hearts

Zen-Nippon East Waste Tour '91 (全日本EAST WASTE TOUR '91, All Japan East Waste Tour '91) was a video album produced by the Japanese band The Blue Hearts in concurrence with their tour promoting their most recent album Bust Waste Hip. All of the songs were recorded live during their tour on June 12 or 13 1991, at NHK Hall.

== Chapter Listing ==
1. Opening
2. "Mirai wa Bokura no Te no Naka" (未来は僕等の手の中 The Future is in Our Hands)
3. "Shōnen no Uta" (少年の詩 A Boy's Song)
4. "Speed" (スピード Supiido)
5. "Image" (イメージ Imeeji)
6. "Blues o Ketobase" (ブルースをけとばせ Kick the Blues)
7. "Mayonaka no Telephone" (真夜中のテレフォン Telephone in the Night)
8. "Train-Train" (TRAIN-TRAIN Torein-Torein)
9. "Boku no Migite" (僕の右手 My Right Hand)
10. "Jōnetsu no Bara" (情熱の薔薇 Rose of Passion)
11. "Hito ni Yasashiku" (人にやさしく Be Kind to People)
12. "Linda Linda" (リンダリンダ Rinda Rinda)
13. "Navigator" (ナビゲーター Nabigeetaa)
