= Tour '88 Pretty Pineapple Special =

Video by The Blue Hearts
- Released: 1988
- Genre: Rock
- Language: Japanese
- Label: Juggler Records
- Producer: The Blue Hearts

Tour '88 Pretty Pineapple Special was a video album produced by the Japanese band The Blue Hearts as a documentary of their first concert at Nippon Budokan just two months after their major debut. The date of the concert was February 12, 1988.

== Songs ==
The following songs are included on the video.

1. "Blue Hearts Theme" (ブルーハーツのテーマ Burū Haatsu no Teema)
2. "Hito ni Yasashiku" (人にやさしく Be Kind to People)
3. "Eiyū ni Akogarete" (英雄にあこがれて Admiring the Hero)
4. "Owaranai Uta" (終わらない歌 An Endless Song)
5. "Chernobyl" (チェルノブイル Cherunobuiru)
6. "Linda Linda" (リンダリンダ Rinda Rinda)
