= 1987 in Japanese music =

In 1987 (Shōwa 62), Japanese music was released on records, and there were charts, awards, contests and festivals.

During that year, Japan continued to have the second largest music market in the world.

== Awards, contests and festivals ==
The 29th Osaka International Festival (Japanese: 大阪国際フェスティバル) was held from 7 to 27 April 1987. The 16th Tokyo Music Festival was held in June 1987. The 1st Teens' Music Festival was held on 5 August 1987. The final of the 18th World Popular Song Festival was held on 31 October 1987. The 1st "Band Explosion" festival was held on 1 November 1987. The final of the 16th FNS Music Festival was held on 15 December 1987. The 29th Japan Record Awards were held on 31 December 1987. The 38th NHK Kōhaku Uta Gassen was held on 31 December 1987.

Akina Nakamori won the grand prix for Japanese artist of the year at the 1st Japan Gold Disc Awards.

The 36th Otaka prize was won by Akira Nishimura and Joji Yuasa.

== Number one singles ==
Oricon

The following reached number 1 on the weekly Oricon Singles Chart:

Issue date	Song	Artist(s)
5 January	"Yakusoku"	Mamiko Takai
12 January	"White Rabbit Kara no Message"	Marina Watanabe
19 January	"Rakuen no Door"	Yoko Minamino
26 January	"Too Adult"	Minayo Watanabe
2 February	"No More Renai Gokko"	Onyanko Club
9 February	"Yuki Gani"	Yoshi Ikuzō
16 February	"Tango Noir"	Akina Nakamori
23 February	"Tango Noir"	Akina Nakamori
2 March	Kashiko	Ushiroyubi Sasaregumi
9 March	"Mizu no Rogue"	Kyoko Koizumi
16 March	"Stripe Blue"	Shonentai
23 March	"Sapphire no Hitomi"	The Alfee
30 March	"Kagerō"	Mamiko Takai
6 April	"Idol wo Sagase"	Momoko Kikuchi
13 April	"Hanashikake Takatta"	Yoko Minamino
20 April	"Marina no Natsu"	Marina Watanabe
27 April	"Pink no Chao"	Minayo Watanabe
4 May	"Strawberry Time"	Seiko Matsuda
11 May	"Strawberry Time"	Seiko Matsuda
18 May	"Toki no Kawa wo Koete"	Ushirogami Hikaretai
25 May	"Strawberry Time"	Seiko Matsuda
1 June	"Katatsumuri Samba"	Onyanko Club
8 June	"Mizu no Naka no Answer"	Kiyotaka Sugiyama
15 June	"Blonde"	Akina Nakamori
22 June	"Blonde"	Akina Nakamori
29 June	"Sayonara no Kajitsutachi"	Yōko Oginome
6 July	"Kimi Dake ni"	Shonentai
13 July	"Pandora no Koibito"	Yoko Minamino
20 July	"Wanderer"	Checkers
27 July	"Natsuyasumi Dake no Sidesheet"	Marina Watanabe
3 August	"Marionette"	Boøwy
10 August	"Amaryllis"	Minayo Watanabe
17 August	"Marionette"	Boøwy
24 August	"Kita no Tabibito"	Yujiro Ishihara
31 August	"Star Light"	Hikaru Genji
7 September	"Shade"	Kiyotaka Sugiyama
14 September	"Kindan no Telepathy"	Shizuka Kudo
21 September	"Niji no Dreamer"	Yui Asaka
28 September	"Naite Miryaii Jan"	Masahiko Kondō
5 October	"Aki no Indication"	Yoko Minamino
12 October	"Nanpasen"	Akina Nakamori
19 October	"Catch Me"	Miho Nakayama
26 October	"Remember"	Kazama San Shimai
2 November	"Kiss wo Tomenai de"	Kyōko Koizumi
9 November	"My Truth"	The Alfee
16 November	"Pearl-White Eve"	Seiko Matsuda
23 November	"ABC (Songs for Boys)"	Shonentai
30 November	"Show Me"	Yukari Morikawa
7 December	"Glass no Jūdai"	Hikaru Genji
14 December	"Haikara san ga Toru"	Yoko Minamino
21 December	"Glass no Jūdai"	Hikaru Genji
28 December	"Glass no Jūdai"	Hikaru Genji

Music Labo

The following reached number 1 on the Music Labo chart:

- 23 March: Sapphire no Hitomi - The Alfee
- 30 March: Hade!!! - Miho Nakayama

Cash Box

The following reached number 1 on the Cash Box chart:

- 5 September: Nile In Blue - Momoko Kikuchi

== Number one albums and LPs ==
Music Labo

The following reached number 1 on the Music Labo chart:

- 5 January, 12 January and 26 January: Crimson - Akina Nakamori
- 2 February: Itoguchi - Mamiko Takai
- 9 February: Top Gun soundtrack
- 16 February and 23 February: Crystal Night - 1986 Omega Tribe
- 2 March: Side Line - Onyanko Club
- 9 March: Marina - Marina Watanabe
- 16 March and 23 March: Mind Note - Junichi Inagaki
- 30 March: Realtime to Paradise - Kiyotaka Sugiyama
- 14 December: Before The Diamond Dust Fades - Yumi Matsutoya

Cash Box

The following reached number 1 on the Cash Box chart:

- 24 January: Alarm à la mode - Yumi Matsutoya
- 31 January and 14 February: Crimson - Akina Nakamori
- 21 February: Non-Stopper - Yōko Oginome
- 14 March: Crystal Night - Omega Tribe
- 11 April: A-La-Ba La-M-Ba - Kōji Kikkawa
- 25 April and 9 May: Realtime to Paradise - Kiyotaka Sugiyama
- 30 May: As Close As Possible - Off Course
- 6 June: Go - Checkers
- 11 July: Remix Rebecca - Rebecca
- 22 August: Breath - Misato Watanabe
- 3 October, 24 October, 7 November and 14 November: Bad - Michael Jackson

Oricon

The following reached number 1 on the Oricon LPs chart:

- 19 January and 26 January: Crimson - Akina Nakamori
- 2 February and 9 February: Itoguchi - Mamiko Takai
- 16 February and 23 February: Crystal Night - Omega Tribe
- 2 March: Side Line - Onyanko Club
- 9 March: Marina - Marina Watanabe
- 16 March: Mind Note - Junichi Inagaki
- 23 March: ∞ (Japanese: アンリミテッド) - Ushiroyubi Sasaregumi
- 30 March, 6 April, 13 April, 20 April and 27 April: Realtime to Paradise - Kiyotaka Sugiyama
- 4 May: Fūmu - Yuki Saito
- 11 May and 18 May: Go - Checkers
- 25 May and 1 June: Strawberry Time - Seiko Matsuda
- 8 June, 15 June, 22 June and 29 June: Remix Rebecca - Rebecca
- 6 July and 20 July: Club Surfbound - Shōgo Hamada
- 13 July: Time 19 - Shonentai
- 27 July: Breath - Misato Watanabe
- 3 August: The Checkers Best - Checkers
- 10 August: Yūyu Kōsen (Japanese: ゆうゆ光線) - Yūyu
- 17 August and 31 August: License - Tsuyoshi Nagabuchi
- 24 August: Request - Mariya Takeuchi
- 7 September: Cross My Palm - Akina Nakamori
- 14 September and 21 September: Psychopath - Boøwy
- 28 September: Bad - Michael Jackson

The following reached number 1 on the Oricon Albums Chart:

- 5 October and 12 October: Bad - Michael Jackson
- 19 October: Birds - Hideaki Tokunaga
- 26 October: Nothing Like the Sun - Sting
- 2 November: Naturally - Naoyuki Fujii
- 9 November: Garland - Yoko Minamino
- 16 November: Collection - Miho Nakayama
- 23 November: Humansystem - TM Network
- 30 November: Snow Garden - Seiko Matsuda
- 7 December: Poison - Rebecca
- 14 December, 21 December and 28 December: Before The Diamond Dust Fades - Yumi Matsutoya

== Annual charts ==
Eiko Segawa's Inochi Kurenai was number 1 in the Oricon annual singles chart.

== Film and television ==
The music of A Taxing Woman, by Toshiyuki Honda, won the 42nd Mainichi Film Award for Best Music. The same music also won the 11th Japan Academy Film Prize for Best Music (awarded in 1988). The music of the 1987 film adaptation of The Drifting Classroom is by Joe Hisaishi, and the theme song Yasei No Kaze is by Miki Imai. Songs in Bubblegum Crisis include "Konyawa Hurricane" (Japanese: 今夜はハリケーン) by Kinuko Ōmori.

== Music industry ==
There were 3,010 record rental shops on 15 April 1987.

== Debuts ==
- Rie Hatada debuted as a singer

== Other singles released ==
- Wangan Taiyōzoku and Kitakaze no Carol by Yōko Oginome
- Sekai de Ichiban Atsui Natsu by Princess Princess
- Wakare no Yokan by Teresa Teng
- Wedding Dress by Onyanko Club
- Again by Shizuka Kudo
- 50/50 by Miho Nakayama
- New Season and Overheat Night by Chisato Moritaka
- Hito ni Yasashiku, Linda Linda and Kiss Shite Hoshii by The Blue Hearts

== Other albums and EPs released ==
- CD'87 by Akina Nakamori
- Route 246 Connexion and Pop Groover: The Best by Yōko Oginome
- Neo Geo and The Last Emperor by Ryuichi Sakamoto
- Teleportation by Princess Princess
- In the Precious Age by Mari Hamada
- Circle by Onyanko Club
- One and Only by Miho Nakayama
- Hurricane Eyes by Loudness
- Tehillim 33 by Sayuri Kume
- Casiopea Perfect Live II and Platinum by Casiopea
- Truth by T-Square
- New Season by Chisato Moritaka
- Groovin' by Toshinobu Kubota
- Hurry Up Mode and Sexual XXXXX! by Buck-Tick
- Trade Last and Immigration by Show-Ya
- Couples by Pizzicato Five
- The Blue Hearts and Young and Pretty by The Blue Hearts

== See also ==
- Timeline of Japanese music
- 1987 in Japan
- 1987 in music
- w:ja:1987年の音楽
