= Mikio Shirai =

Japanese keyboardist (born 1950)

Mikio Shirai 白井 幹夫
- Also known as: Mickey
- Born: May 31, 1950 (age 74)
- Origin: Minato, Tokyo
- Genres: Rock music
- Occupation: Musician
- Instrument(s): Piano, keyboard
- Years active: 1990–present
- Labels: Cicada Peaks
- Website: Official Site

Mikio Shirai (白井 幹夫, Shirai Mikio, b. May 31, 1950) is a Japanese keyboardist who was born in Tokyo's Minato ward.

== Personal History ==
In the late 1980s and early '90s, he worked as a support member for The Blue Hearts and played the keyboard for them on their tours. After The Blue Hearts broke up, Shirai joined with the band's two lead members, Hiroto Kōmoto and Masatoshi Mashima, to form a new group, The High-Lows, in 1995.

Shirai left The High-Lows in 2003. While embarking on a solo career, he also joined with a third former member of The Blue Hearts, Tetsuya Kajiwara, to form another band, The Big Hip.
