= The Blue Hearts (album) =

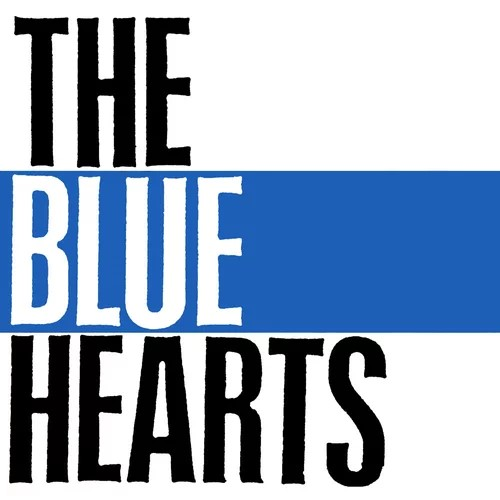

Studio album by The Blue Hearts
- Released: May 21, 1987
- Recorded: Music Inn Yamanakako Studio; Sound Inn
- Genre: Punk rock
- Length: 33:59
- Language: Japanese
- Label: Meldac Records
- Producer: The Blue Hearts

The Blue Hearts chronology
The Blue Hearts	Young and Pretty

Singles from The Blue Hearts
- 1. "Linda Linda" Released: May 1, 1987

The Blue Hearts (ザ・ブルーハーツ, Za Burū Hātsu) is the self-produced first album released by the Japanese band The Blue Hearts. They had put together albums as an independent band, but this was their first official release. It has a different track listing from their self-titled EP, which was released in the U.S. in 1990.

This album was the most energetic of all The Blue Hearts' albums and over half of the songs were included on the bands "best of" compilation album. Though the single "Hito ni Yasashiku" was written and recorded during their time as an independent band, it was not included on their first album.

In September 2007, Rolling Stone Japan rated The Blue Hearts #3 on their list of "The 100 Greatest Japanese Rock Albums of All Time". It was named number 2 on Bounce's 2009 list of "54 Standard Japanese Rock Albums".

== Charts ==
The album reached number 31 on the Oricon Albums Chart.

== Track details ==
Before making their major debut, The Blue Hearts often sang "Mirai wa Bokura no Te no Naka" to open the second half of their acts. When they were making this album, the plan was to release it as the first song on the cassette's B-side (seventh song overall) to match their acts. However, when they had trouble recording "Blue Hearts Theme", which was supposed to be the first song on the A-side, they decided to make "Mirai wa Bokura no Te no Naka" the first song.

A cover of "Mirai wa Bokura no Te no Naka" was used as the opening theme for the 2007 anime series Gyakkyō Burai Kaiji: Ultimate Survivor, an adaptation of the first arc of Nobuyuki Fukumoto's manga Kaiji.

During the middle and latter parts of the band's career, they often started off live performances with the song. "Blue Hearts Theme" was eventually replaced by "Sekai no Mannaka", the eighth song. "Kime no Tame" was also a replacement song, as "Chain Gang" was shelved due to some lyrical content.

"Owaranai Uta" caused some controversy because of its use of the Japanese word for "lunatic" (気違い, kichigai), which was a word prohibited from broadcast. As a result, the lyrics were not printed on the cassette cover and the words were masked by heavy guitar sounds on the recording.

Two of the songs, "No No No" and "Shōnen no Uta", were originally written for Kōmoto's previous band, The Coats (ザ・コーツ), but were performed and recorded by The Blue Hearts. Also, "Dance Number" is the shortest of all The Blue Hearts' songs.

The track "Linda Linda" was also released as a single, but there were separate recordings for the two releases. The biggest changes are the drums sounds and the addition of a third guitar on the album version. The album version of "Linda Linda" is the one often performed at concerts.

== Track listing ==
No.	Title	Length
1.	"Mirai wa Bokura no Te no Naka (未来は僕等の手の中 The Future is in Our Hands)"	2:25
2.	"Owaranai Uta (終わらない歌 An Endless Song)"	3:04
3.	"No No No (NO NO NO)"	2:26
4.	"Punk Rock (パンク・ロック Panku Rokku)"	3:41
5.	"Machi (街 Town)"	3:18
6.	"Shōnen no Uta" (少年の詩 A Boy's Poem)"	2:41
7.	"Bakudan ga Okkochiru Toki (爆弾が落っこちる時 When the Bombs Fall)"	2:06
8.	"Sekai no Mannaka (世界のまん中 Middle of the World)"	2:20
9.	"Hadaka no Ō-sama (裸の王様 The Naked Emperor)"	2:50
10.	"Dance Number (ダンス・ナンバー Dansu Nanbaa)"	1:28
11.	"Kimi no Tame (君のため For You)"	4:18
12.	"Linda Linda (リンダリンダ)"	3:22
Total length:		33:59

== See also ==
- 1987 in Japanese music
