= Shirai =

Shirai (written: 白井 or 紫雷) is a Japanese surname. Notable people with the surname include:

- Hiroyuki Shirai (白井 博幸; born 1974), Japanese footballer
- Hiroshi Shirai (白井 寛; born 1937), Japanese karateka, teaching in Italy
- Io Shirai (紫雷 イオ; born 1990), Japanese professional wrestler
- Kaiu Shirai (白井 カイウ), Japanese manga artist and writer
- Kenzō Shirai (白井 健三; born 1996), Japanese gymnast
- Kosuke Shirai (白井 康介; born 1994), Japanese footballer
- Masaki Shirai (白井 眞輝; born 1982), Japanese musician
- Mikio Shirai (白井 幹夫; born 1950), Japanese keyboardist
- Mio Shirai (紫雷 美央; born 1980), Japanese professional wrestler
- Mitsutaro Shirai (白井 光太郎; 1863 – 1932), Japanese plant pathologist
- Noriyasu Shirai, survivor of China Airlines Flight 140
- Rio Shirai (白井 璃緒; born 1999), Japanese swimmer
- Takako Shirai (volleyball) (白井 貴子; born 1952), Japanese volleyball player
- Yoshio Shirai (白井 義男; 1923 – 2003), Japanese boxer
- Yusuke Shirai (白井 悠介; born 1986), Japanese voice actor

== Fictional characters ==
- Chikako Shirai (白井 知佳子), a character in the manga Great Teacher Onizuka
- Hinako Shirai (白井 日菜子), the protagonist in the video game Blue Reflection
- Kimiaki Shirai (白井 功明), a character in the manga Love Hina
- Kosuke Shirai (白井 コースケ), a character in the manga Urusei Yatsura
- Kotarō Shirai (白井 虎太郎), a character in Kamen Rider Blade
- Kuroko Shirai (白井 黒子), a side character in Toaru Majutsu no Index, and a supporting character in Toaru Kagaku no Railgun
- Momoko Shirai (白井 桃子), a character in Wandering Son
- Sae Shirai (白井 沙江), a character in the manga Kodomo no Jikan

== See also ==
- Shirai (grape), another name for the Azerbaijani wine grape Madrasa
