= Tetsuya Kajiwara =

Tetsuya Kajiwara may refer to

- Tetsuya Kajiwara (drummer), drummer with The Blue Hearts
- Tetsuya Kajiwara (Fushigi Yūgi), a character in the manga Fushigi Yūgi
