= Wakare no Yokan =

Single by Teresa Teng

from the album Wakare no Yokan
- Language: Japanese
- B-side: "Drunken Exploration"
- Released: June 21, 1987
- Genre: J-pop; dance
- Length: 4:29
- Label: Taurus Records
- Composer: Takashi Miki
- Lyricist: Toyohisa Araki

Teresa Teng singles chronology
"Scandal" (1986)	"Wakare no Yokan" (1987)	"Koibito Tachi no Shinwa" (1988)

"Wakare no Yokan" (Japanese: 別れの予感; English: Premonition of Separation) is a song recorded by Taiwanese singer Teresa Teng. It was released in Japan as a 7-inch single through Taurus Records on June 21, 1987. It served as the lead single for her Japanese studio album of the same name, which was released on July 5, 1987.

== Commercial performance ==
"Wakare no Yokan" peaked at number 16 on the Oricon Singles Chart and remained on the chart for 38 weeks. It appeared at number 94 on the year-end Oricon Singles Chart in 1988. It received a gold certification from the Recording Industry Association of Japan (RIAJ) in downloads in October 2016.

== Accolades ==
Awards for "Wakare no Yokan"
Award	Year	Category	Result	Ref.
All Japan Cable Broadcasting Awards	1987	Grand Prix (first half)	Won	
All Japan Cable Broadcasting Awards	1987	Excellent Star Award (yearly)	Won	
Japan Cable Awards	1987	Cable Music Award	Won	
Japan Cable Awards	1987	Grand Prix	Nominated	
Japan Cable Awards	1988	Cable Music Award	Won	
Japan Cable Awards	1988	Grand Prix	Nominated	

== Covers ==
"Wakare no Yokan" has been covered by various artists since its release, including Saori Yuki, Akina Nakamori, Hiromi Iwasaki, Rimi Natsukawa, and Misaki Iwasa.

== Track listing ==
CD single

1. "Wakare no Yokan" (別れの予感) – 4:29
2. "Drunken Tango" (酒醉的探戈) – 4:10

== Credits and personnel ==
- Teresa Teng – vocals
- Toyohisa Araki – lyricist (track 1)
- Takashi Miki – composer (1)
- Yuzo Hayashi – arrangement (1, 2)
- Katsuhisa Hattori – string arrangement (1)
- Zhang Zongrong – lyricist (2)
- Chen Jinming – composer (2)

== Charts ==
=== Weekly charts ===
Chart (1987)	Peak position
Japan Singles (Oricon)	16

=== Year-end charts ===
Chart (1988)	Position
Japan Singles (Oricon)	94

== Certifications ==
Region	Certification	Certified units/sales
Japan (RIAJ) Digital download	Gold	100,000^{*}
^{*} Sales figures based on certification alone.

== See also ==
- 1987 in Japanese music
