= The High-Lows =

Japanese punk rock band

↑THE HIGH-LOWS↓
- Origin: Tokyo, Japan
- Genre: Punk rock
- Years active: 1995–2005
- Labels: Kitty MME (1995-2000); Universal Music (2000-2004); BMG Japan/Happysong Records (2004-2005)
- Past members: Hiroto Kōmoto; Masatoshi Mashima; Sakito Shirabe; Kenji Ōshima; Mikio Shirai
- Website: high-lows.net/

The High-Lows (ザ・ハイロウズ, Za Hairōzu; stylized as ↑THE HIGH-LOWS↓) were a popular Japanese punk rock band that was formed in 1995. The band stopped all activities in November 2005 and broke up.

== Members ==
- Hiroto Kōmoto – vocals, harmonica, occasional rhythm guitar
- Masatoshi Mashima – guitar, backing vocals, occasional lead vocals
- Sakito Shirabe – bass
- Kenji Ōshima – drums
- Mikio Shirai – keyboards

Kōmoto and Mashima used to be in The Blue Hearts, with Shirai occasionally supporting them. Shirai left before the recording of their final album, and the band continued as a 4-piece without replacing him. In August 2006, Kōmoto and Mashima created a new band, The Cro-Magnons.

== Discography ==
=== Original albums ===
1. The High-Lows (October 25, 1995) (Oricon No. 5)
2. Tigermobile (December 6, 1996) (Oricon No. 6)
3. Lobster (ロブスター, Robusutā) (May 8, 1998) (Oricon No. 5) - Jacket design by Downtown's Hitoshi Matsumoto
4. Baumkuchen (バームクーヘン, Bāmukūhen) (June 9, 1999) (Oricon No. 8)
5. Relaxin' With the High-Lows (June 9, 2000) (Oricon No. 3)
6. Hotel Tiki-Poto (September 5, 2001) (Oricon No. 4)
7. Angel Beetle (November 27, 2002) (Oricon No. 6)
8. Do!! The★Mustang (September 1, 2004) (Oricon No. 9)

=== Mini-albums ===
1. 4×5 (May 14, 1997) (Oricon No. 9)
2. Go! High-Lows Go! (GO! ハイロウズ GO!, Gō! Hairōzu Gō!) (December 1, 1999) (Oricon No. 25)

=== Compilation albums ===
1. Flip Flop (January 24, 2000) (Oricon No. 4)
2. Flip Flop 2 (November 12, 2003) (Oricon No. 10)
3. Flash ~Best~ (January 1, 2006)

=== Singles ===
1. "Missile Man" (ミサイルマン, Misairuman) (October 25, 1995) (Oricon No. 45)
2. "Goodbye" (グッドバイ, Guddobai) (November 25, 1995) (Oricon No. 100)
3. "Supersonic Jet Boy" (スーパーソニックジェットボーイ, Sūpāsonikku Jetto Bōi) (January 25, 1996) (Oricon No. 40)
4. "Mune ga Doki Doki" (胸がドキドキ) (February 21, 1996) (Oricon No. 10) - first opening theme to the anime Detective Conan
5. "Sōdan Tengoku" (相談天国) (June 24, 1996) (Oricon No. 10)
6. "Rockin Chair" (ロッキンチェアー, Rokkin Cheā) (December 6, 1996) (Oricon No. 45)
7. "Happy Go Lucky" (February 14, 1997) (Oricon No. 56)
8. "Gekkō Yōkō" (月光陽光) (June 11, 1997) (Oricon No. 44)
9. "Sennen Medal" (千年メダル, Sennen Medaru) (April 29, 1998) (Oricon No. 39) - Jacket design by Downtown's Hitoshi Matsumoto
10. "Mayonaka Laser Gun" (真夜中レーザーガン, Mayonaka Rēzā Gan) (August 26, 1998) (Oricon No. 45) - Jacket design by Downtown's Hitoshi Matsumoto
11. "Rolling Jet Thunder" (ローリング・ジェット・サンダー, Rōringu Jetto Sandā) (December 16, 1998) (Oricon No. 27)
12. "Tsumi to Batsu" (罪と罰) (April 21, 1999) (Oricon No. 24)
13. "Husky (Yokubō Toiu na no Sensha)" (ハスキー（欲望という名の戦車）, Hasukī (Yokubō toiu Na no Sensha)) (June 9, 1999) (Oricon No. 33)
14. "Seishun" (青春) (May 24, 2000) (Oricon No. 8)
15. "FLOWER" (September 6, 2000) (Oricon No. 18)
16. "Jūyonsai/Full Court" (十四才/フルコート, Jūyonsai/Furu Kōto) (August 8, 2001) (Oricon No. 15)
17. "New York" (ニューヨーク, Nyū Yōku) (October 11, 2001) (Oricon No. 30)
18. "Ikasuze OK" (いかすぜOK) (February 20, 2002) (Oricon No. 15)
19. "Too Late To Die" (September 4, 2002) (Oricon No. 15)
20. "Hitori de Otona, Hitori de Kodomo/Oretachi ni Asu wa Nai" (一人で大人 一人で子供/俺たちに明日は無い) (November 6, 2002) (Oricon No. 20)
21. "Natsu Nandana" (夏なんだな) (June 25, 2003) (Oricon No. 9)
22. "Nichiyōbi Yori no Shisha" (日曜日よりの使者) (February 11, 2004) (Oricon No. 20) - Theme song for the Zebraman film
23. "Kōya Haruka ni/Zūtoro (69 Version)" (荒野はるかに/ズートロ (69バージョン), Kōya Haruka ni/Zūtoro (69 Bājon)) (June 9, 2004) (Oricon No. 10)
24. "Satetsu" (砂鉄) (July 21, 2004) (Oricon No. 16)
25. "Spider Hop" (スパイダー・ホップ, Supaidā Hoppu) (December 15, 2004) (Oricon No. 26)
26. "Thunder Road" (サンダーロード, Sandā Rōdo) (May 18, 2005) (Oricon No. 16)

=== Videos ===
1. The High-Lows Tōjō!! Tour (ハイロウズ登場!!TOUR) (VHS, March 6, 1996; extended DVD, December 9, 2001)
2. The High-Lows' Holidays in the Sun (ハイロウズのホリデイズ・イン・ザ・サン, Hairōzu no Horideizu In Za San) (VHS, March 5, 1997; extended DVD, December 19, 2001)
3. that summer feeling (VHS/DVD, December 19, 2001)
4. Puttin' on the Style (w/The Quarrymen) (DVD, June 9, 2004)
5. The★Mustang 04-05 (DVD, September 21, 2005)
6. Flash Back: Vol. 1 (DVD, February 22, 2006)
7. Flash Back: Vol. 2 (DVD, February 22, 2006)
8. Trash Bag (DVD, May 24, 2006)
