= Young and Pretty =

Studio album by The Blue Hearts
- Released: November 21, 1987; November 21, 2007 (limited edition)
- Studios: Music Inn Yamanakako Studio; Sound Inn
- Genre: Punk rock
- Length: 43:53
- Language: Japanese
- Label: Meldac Records
- Producers: The Blue Hearts; Masahide Sakuma

The Blue Hearts chronology
The Blue Hearts	Young and Pretty	Train-Train

Singles from Young and Pretty
- 1. "Kiss Shite Hoshii" Released: November 21, 1987

Young and Pretty (ヤング・アンド・プリティ, Yangu ando Puriti) is the second studio album released by the Japanese band The Blue Hearts. Along with Dug Out, it is one of only two studio albums consisting of a cover actually showing members of the band.

== Charts ==
The album reached number 10 on the Oricon Albums Chart.

== Album history ==
About half of the songs on this album were originally written while the band was an amateur independent band. The new songs were produced by Masahide Sakuma (佐久間 正英 Sakuma Masahide). Other changes include Masatoshi Mashima singing main vocals for some songs, Hiroto Kōmoto playing a blues harp, and the addition of a keyboard.

The three songs that were written specifically for this album are "Tōku Made", "Hoshi o Kudasai", and "Eiyū ni Akogarete". They announced that they were going to include two other songs from their time as amateurs, "Mado o Akeyō" (窓をあけよう Open the Window) and "Hon no Sukoshi Dake" (ほんの少しだけ Just a Little Bit), but these songs were never released.

Because there were a number of songs that stepped away from the normal eight-beat rhythm, recording was a problem. When Sakuma would not allow the recordings to be finalized, Kōmoto said, "This is a Blue Hearts record, so shouldn't our own abilities be enough?" Looking back, though, the group realizes that their own recording knowledge was insufficient for this record.

== Songs ==
The first song, "Kiss Shite Hoshii" was released as a single at the same time the album was released. "Chain Gang" was the single's B-side.

"Roku de Nashi II", which has a subtitle "Gitaa Hiki ni Heya wa Nashi" (ギター弾きに部屋は無し No room for a guitar player) describes the many refusals Mashima received when searching for an apartment.

"Romantic" is the oldest song that The Blue Hearts play, as it came from Kōmoto's time with his previous band, Za Kōtsu. "Scrap" is the next oldest song.

"Restaurant" is the band's first ska tune.

== Track listing ==
No.	Title	Length
1.	"Kiss Shite Hoshii (キスしてほしい I Want a Kiss)"	3:15
2.	"Roku de Nashi II (ロクデナシII Good-for-nothing II)"	2:15
3.	"Scrap (スクラップ)"	2:40
4.	"Roku de Nashi (ロクデナシ Good-for-nothing)"	3:18
5.	"Romantic (ロマンチック)"	3:50
6.	"Line o Koete (ラインを越えて Cross the Line)"	6:40
7.	"Chewing Gum o Kaminagara (チューインガムをかみながら While Chewing Gum)"	2:43
8.	"Tōku Made (遠くまで Faraway)"	3:21
9.	"Hoshi o Kudasai (星をください Please Give Me a Star)"	3:01
10.	"Restaurant (レストラン)"	3:02
11.	"Eiyū ni Akogarete (英雄にあこがれて Admiring the Hero)"	3:50
12.	"Chain Gang (チェインギャング)"	5:58
Total length:		43:53

== See also ==
- 1987 in Japanese music
