= Just a Beat Show =

Compilation album by The Blue Hearts Lä-Ppisch The London Times The Jumps
- Released: May 1986
- Recorded: Shibuya's Yaneura
- Genre: J-Pop, rock
- Language: Japanese
- Label: Major Record

Just a Beat Show (ジャスト・ア・ビート・ショー) is an omnibus album of a live show in Shibuya's Yaneura on March 3, 1986, in Japan. It was released in May of the same year. The performers were Lä-Ppisch, The London Times, The Blue Hearts and The Jumps.

== Background ==
The CD was originally released in analog format in May 1986 and only about 2,000 copies were sold throughout 1986 and 1987. However, as CDs became more popular, the album was re-released on CD on April 25, 1993. The disc is currently out of production.

Kikujirō Shima (島キクジロウ Shima Kikujirō), the lead vocalist for The Jumps, originally had the idea for the recording and, in December 1985, brought together The Jumps, The London Times, The Blue Hearts and the Hormones for a recording at a live show. There were problems with the recording equipment, however, and the recording failed. By the time they were able to bring the bands back together for a second recording, the Hormones had broken up and had to quickly be replaced by Lä-Ppisch.

== Tracks ==
The album contains twelves tracks, three by each of the artists.

1. "Miyo-chan no Happa" (美代ちゃんのハッパ Miyo-chan's Leaf) (Lä-Ppisch)
2. "Old O'Clock" (Lä-Ppisch)
3. "Megane no Nihon" (めがねの日本 Glasses' Japan) (Lä-Ppisch)
4. "Mukiryokuna Jidai ni Ikiteiru" (無気力な時代に生きている Living in Lethargic Times) (The London Times)
5. "Sunshine Girl" (The London Times)
6. "Monday to Friday" (The London Times)
7. "Hammer" (The Blue Hearts)
8. "Hito ni Yasashiku" (The Blue Hearts)
9. "Mirai wa Bokura no Te no Naka" (未来は僕等の手の中 The Future is in Our Hands) (The Blue Hearts)
10. "Nothin' to Do" (The Jumps)
11. "Jumpin' Stray Rocker" (The Jumps)
12. "Cool Nights" (The Jumps)
