= Too Much Pain =

Single by The Blue Hearts

from the album High Kicks
- A-side: "'Too Much Pain'"
- B-side: "'Nakanaide Koibito Yo'"
- Released: March 10, 1992
- Recorded: Avaco Creative Studio
- Genre: Rock
- Length: 11m48s
- Label: East West Japan
- Songwriter(s): Masatoshi Mashima
- Producer(s): The Blue Hearts

The Blue Hearts singles chronology
"'Ano Ko ni Touch'" (1991)	"Too Much Pain" (1992)	"'Yume'" (1992)

"Too Much Pain" (トゥ・マッチ・ペイン, Tu Matchi Pein) was the twelfth single by the Japanese band The Blue Hearts and reached #29 on the Oricon charts in 1992.

== Details ==
Too Much Pain was released as part of The Blue Hearts' fifth album, High Kicks, which had been released on December 21, 1991, but the song itself was from the band's amateur days many years prior. They had planned on including it in the independent release with Blue Hearts Theme and Chernobyl, but the song Sha La La was thought to be a better fit.

Up until 1987, the song was performed regularly, with nothing more than Mashima's guitar and Hiroto Kōmoto's vocals. After that, they only played the song on special occasions. The last time that the two of them performed the song live by themselves was on May 31, 1989, on the last day of their On Tour tour in Yoyogi Park. The two chose to perform that day because they had once seen Bruce Springsteen perform at a concert there and sang it as a tribute.

The B-side track, Nakanaide Koibito Yo (泣かないで恋人よ, Don't Cry, Lover), was also written by Mashima. It is still occasionally performed by The Blue Hearts' supporting member Mikio Shirai when he plays with his new band, The Big Hip.
