= The Cro-Magnons =

Japanese rock band

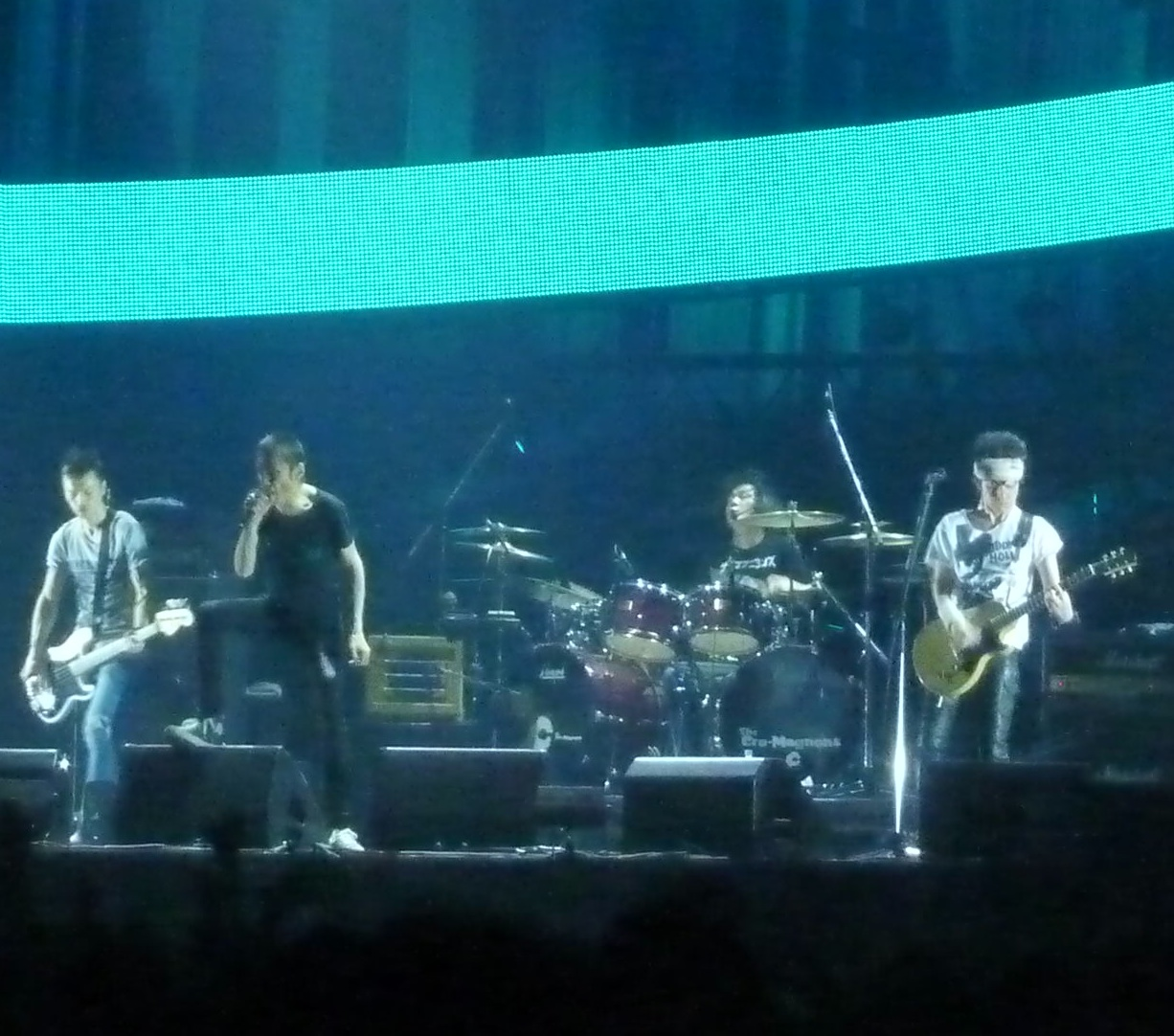
- The Cro-Magnons live in Japan, 2011

Background information
- Origin: Tokyo, Japan
- Genre: Punk rock
- Years active: 2006–present
- Labels: Ariola Japan, BMG Japan/Happysong
- Spinoffs: The Blue Hearts; The High-Lows
- Members: Hiroto Kōmoto (Vocals); Masatoshi Mashima (Guitar); Masaru Kobayashi (Bass); Katsuji Kirita (Drums)
- Website: cro-magnons.net

The Cro-Magnons (ザ・クロマニヨンズ, Za Kuromaniyonzu) is a Japanese rock band founded in July 2006 by Hiroto Kōmoto (vocals) and Masatoshi Mashima (guitar), both previously of The Blue Hearts and The High-Lows, with Masaru Kobayashi (bass) and Katsuji Kirita (drums).

== History ==
After The High-Lows ceased activity in November 2005, Mashima proposed forming a new band with Kōmoto. Due to an introduction from a recording engineer named Satoshi Kawaguchi, known from the time of The Blue Hearts, Kobayashi and Kirita joined the formation of The Cro-Magnons. The name of the band came after Mashima and Komoto saw The Rolling Stones perform live at the Nagoya Dome. Their first album had already been recorded and the band was tentatively named "Kuromaniyonzu".

With their album due to be finished in the winter of 2006, they appeared all over the country in summer music events without announcement and without a name. On the net, people blinked and wondered "Is this Hiroto and Mashi's new band?" Before their live performance on Osaka's "Meet The World Beat 2006," news of their appearance was leaked and some of the crowd called out "Hiroto!", "Mashi!". With a bitter smile, the band members said "It wasn't a secret at all." At 1:41pm on July 23, The Cro-Magnons made their first official appearance as a band. Two months later, on September 20, the band began their first nationwide tour, "The Cro-Magnons Shutsugen Tour!!" (ザ・クロマニヨンズ出現ツアー!! The Cro-Magnons Appear Tour!!).

The band had a second tour in early 2007, entitled "Haru no Uraura Matsuri" (春のウラウラ祭り Spring Gently Shining Festival), with 16 performances nationwide.

The Cro-Magnons continue to be prolific in their songwriting and touring. Recent tours have included the tour for the Rainbow Thunder album which began November 7, 2018 going until April 20, 2019 and also the tour for the Punch Album which ended early in March 2020 due to safety concerns about the Coronavirus.

== Band members ==
Founders, Hiroto Kōmoto and Masatoshi Mashima, worked together in two previous bands—The Blue Hearts and The High-Lows. Bassist Masaru Kobayashi previously performed with Sads and Soy Sauce Sonix. He is currently involved in nil. Drummer Katsuji Kirita also performs with Gargoyle.

== Discography ==
=== Albums ===
| Title | Release date | Peak chart position |
| Title | Release date | Oricon |
|---|---|---|
| The Cro-Magnons | 2006.10.25 | 4 |
| Cave Party | 2007.09.12 | 7 |
| Fire Age | 2008.10.15 | 3 |
| Mondo Roccia | 2009.10.28 | 5 |
| Oi! um bobo | 2010.11.10 | 7 |
| Ace Rocker | 2012.01.18 | 6 |
| Yeti vs. Cromagnon | 2013.02.06 | 4 |
| Gumbo Inferno | 2014.09.24 | 4 |
| Jungle 9 | 2015.10.21 | 3 |
| Bimboroll | 2016.11.02 | 5 |
| Lucky & Heaven | 2017.10.11 | 6 |
| Rainbow Thunder | 2018.10.10 | 5 |
| Punch | 2019.10.09 | 6 |
| Mud Shakes | 2020.12.02 | 7 |
| Six Kicks Rock & Roll | 2022.01.19 | 3 |
| Mountain Banana | 2023.01.18 | 2 |
| Hey! Wonder | 2024.02.07 | 6 |
| Jambo Japan | 2025.10.29 | 6 |

=== Singles ===
| Title | Release date | Peak chart positions | |
| Title | Release date | Oricon | Japan Hot 100 |
|---|---|---|---|
| "Tariho" (Note: "TallyHo" has been suggested as a transliteration but there is no English equivalent in this context.) (タリホー) | 2006.09.20 | 3 | × |
| "Paper Plane" (紙飛行機) | 2007.04.25 | 7 | × |
| "Giri Giri Ga Gan Gan" (ギリギリガガンガン) | 2007.08.15 | 8 | × |
| "Eight Bit" (エイトビート) | 2008.05.21 | 7 | 16 |
| "Speed and Knife" (スピードとナイフ) | 2008.08.27 | 13 | 21 |
| "Glycerin Queen" (グリセリン・クイーン) | 2009.10.07 | 7 | 23 |
| "Motorcycle, Leather Jacket and Curry" (オートバイと皮ジャンパーとカレー) | 2010.10.20 | 9 | 20 |
| "Streamline/Tobinore! Bonnie!" (流線型/飛び乗れ!ボニー!) | 2011.03.02 | 10 | 35 |
| "Number One SOB!" (ナンバーワン野郎!) | 2011.09.14 | 8 | 11 |
| "Rain or Shine" (雷雨決行) | 2011.12.14 | 8 | 22 |
| "Assault Rock" (突撃ロック) | 2012.05.23 | 18 | 18 |
| "Flame" (炎) | 2012.12.12 | 13 | 18 |
| "Kiss Made Ikeru" (キスまでいける) | 2014.08.06 | 16 | ? |
| "Erubisu Kari" (エルビス仮) | 2015.09.09 | 15 | ? |
| "Petenshi Rock" (ペテン師ロック) | 2016.09.14 | ? | ? |
| "Donzoko" (どん底) | 2017.8.30 | ? | ? |
| "Ikiru" (生きる) | 2018.09.29 | ? | ? |
| "Crane Game" | 2019.08.28 | 16 | — |
| "Carburetor ni Hitoshizuku" (キャブレターにひとしずく) | 2025.09.17 | 7 | — |
"—" denotes releases that did not chart or were not released in that region. "×" denotes periods where charts did not exist or were not archived.
