= Pan (album) =

Studio album by The Blue Hearts
- Released: July 10, 1995
- Recorded: Go Go King Recorders; Avaco Creative Studio; Miz Music Studio
- Genre: Alternative rock
- Length: 64:20
- Language: Japanese
- Label: East West Japan
- Producer: The Blue Hearts

The Blue Hearts chronology
Dug Out	Pan

Pan is the eighth and final studio album released by the Japanese band The Blue Hearts. It was the only album not to have any songs that were released as singles.

== Track listing ==
1. "Drummers' Session" (ドラマーズ・セッション)
2. "Houston Blues" (ヒューストン・ブルース)
3. "Modotte Okure Yo" (もどっておくれよ Come Back to Me)
4. "Boin Killer" (ボインキラー Breast Killer)
5. "Hana ni Natta Kamakiri" (花になったかまきり Praying Mantis that Became a Flower)
6. "Bye-bye Baby" (バイバイBaby)
7. "Aruku Hana" (歩く花 Walking Flower)
8. "Kyūjitsu" (休日 Holiday)
9. "Tobago no Yume" (トバゴの夢 Dream of Tobago)
10. "Kōfuku no Seisansha" (幸福の生産者 Producer of Happiness)
11. "Good Friend (Ai no Mikata)" (Good Friend (愛の味方) Good Friend (Friend of Love))
12. "Hitotoki no Yume" (ひとときの夢 Temporary Dream)
13. "Arigato-san" (ありがとさん Thanks a lot)
