= Bust Waste Hip =

Studio album by The Blue Hearts
- Released: September 10, 1990; February 10, 1993 (rerelease)
- Recorded: Avaco Creative Studio
- Genre: Punk rock
- Length: 52:02
- Language: Japanese
- Label: East West Japan
- Director: Chihiro Tanikawa
- Producer: The Blue Hearts

The Blue Hearts chronology
| Train-Train | Bust Waste Hip | High Kicks |

Singles from Bust Waste Hip
- 1. "Jōnetsu no Bara" Released: July 25, 1990; 2. "Kubitsuri-dai Kara" Released: April 10, 1991

Bust Waste Hip (バスト・ウエスト・ヒップ, Basuto Uesuto Hippu) is the fourth studio album released by the Japanese band The Blue Hearts. The album was a big success and was the first album by the band to reach #1 on the Oricon Albums Chart.

The band went on the Zen-Nippon East Waste Tour in 1991 to promote the album, leading to the release of the Zen-Nippon East Waste Tour '91 video that same year.

== Tracks ==
1. "Image" (イメージ)
2. "Koroshi no License" (殺しのライセンス License to Kill)
3. "Kubitsuri-dai Kara" (首つり台から From the Hangman's Block)
4. "Nō Tenki" (脳天気 Carefree)
5. "Yoru no Naka o" (夜の中を Middle of the Night)
6. "Kanashii Uwasa" (悲しいうわさ Sad Rumor)
7. "H Blues" (Hのブルース)
8. "Yume no Eki" (夢の駅 Dream Station)
9. "Koi no Game" (恋のゲーム Love Game)
10. "Speed" (スピード)
11. "Cutie Pie" (キューティパイ)
12. "Jōnetsu no Bara" (情熱の薔薇 Rose of Passion)
13. "Mayonaka no Telephone" (真夜中のテレフォン Midnight Telephone)
14. "Navigator" (ナビゲーター)

== Cover ==
"Jōnetsu no Bara" was covered by Fujin Rizing!, a fictional ska band from multimedia franchise Argonavis from BanG Dream! and added in the game started on February 19, 2021.

== See also ==
- 1990 in Japanese music
