= The Rolling Girls =

Japanese anime and manga series

- Promotional poster of the series featuring Chiaya, Yukina, Nozomi, and Ai (left to right).

ローリング☆ガールズ (Rōringu Gāruzu)
- Genre: Action, Adventure, Science fiction
- Manga
- Written by: Yōsuke Miyagi
- Illustrated by: Bonkara
- Published by: Mag Garden
- Magazine: Monthly Comic Garden, ONLINE MAGAZINE comic BLADE
- Original run: October 4, 2014 – October 30, 2014
- Manga

Ro~lling Gi~rls Inspiration x Traveler
- Written by: Yōsuke Miyagi
- Illustrated by: Sheepbox
- Published by: Mag Garden
- Magazine: ONLINE MAGAZINE comic BLADE
- Original run: October 27, 2014 – February 25, 2015
- Volumes: 1
- Anime television series
- Directed by: Kotomi Deai
- Written by: Yasuyuki Muto
- Music by: Masaru Yokoyama
- Studio: Wit Studio
- Licensed by: AUS: Madman Entertainment; NA: Funimation; UK: Anime Limited (cancelled)
- Original network: MBS, Tokyo MX, TVA, BS11, TVQ, MBC
- English network: US: Funimation Channel
- Original run: January 10, 2015 – March 28, 2015
- Episodes: 12

The Rolling Girls (ローリング☆ガールズ, Rōringu Gāruzu) is a 2015 Japanese original anime television series produced by Wit Studio. The logo of this title contains the text, "Rolling, Falling, Scrambling Girls. For others. For themselves. Even if they're destined to be a 'mob'".

== Plot ==
Ten years after the end of the "Great Tokyo War" that rocked Japan, most of the country's political and economic elites mysteriously vanished. As a result, the country split up into the original 10 prefectures that soon became independent city-states that competed with each other. Many vigilantes who fought in the aforementioned war became hired as the "Best" (mosa), representing their prefectures in territorial disputes. Their supporters, the "Rest" (mob), work to support them while maintaining the peace within their respective prefectures.

After a prolonged battle with Kuniko leads her friend, Masami to become seriously injured, a rookie Rest named Nozomi decides to travel around Japan on her motorcycle with her new friends, fulfilling requests for Maccha Green while they seek to grow stronger and search for special heart-shaped jewels, the moonlight stones. It is said that the moonlight stone can make a person possesses unlimited power when it is worn, especially by Bests of different regions when combat or fight happens in order to protect themselves, but may lead to serious consequences such as injury of people and damage of properties because of the force emitted by the battle or the people who used it. In reality, it is used as a fuel by aliens in outer space to operate their spaceship.

== Characters ==
=== Main characters ===
Nozomi Moritomo (森友 望未, Moritomo Nozomi)
Voiced by: Ari Ozawa (Japanese); Felecia Angelle (English)
Sole daughter of the Moritomo family and a normal girl whose family runs the Moritomo Restaurant in Tokorozawa. The protagonist and a new recruit of the Hiroshi Town Propellers. A childhood friend of Masami who seeks to grow stronger on her own and loves her as her sister. Her favourite food is the Melonpan. She admires Masami so much and later becomes the Hiyoshi Town Propellers trainee.
Yukina Kosaka (小坂 結季奈, Kosaka Yukina)
Voiced by: Rina Hidaka (Japanese); Monica Rial (English)
A runaway from the same town as Nozomi. She has a poor sense of direction. Due to her shy personality, she is quite polite when speaking with others. She was once protected by the Suzumoto family.
Ai Hibiki (響 逢衣, Hibiki Ai)
Voiced by: Risa Taneda (Japanese); Jad Saxton (English)
An upbeat girl who was kicked out of the Rest of Higashi Murayama Kitatama Dangers after trying to save the Hiroshi Town Propellers who were taken hostage. She is quick to resort to brute force when things go wrong. Ends up joining Nozomi's group.
Chiaya Misono (御園 千綾, Misono Chiaya)
Voiced by: Yumiri Hanamori (Japanese); Leah Clark (English)
A small girl who seeks out the heart-shaped power stones carried by the Best. Somehow knows the childhood nicknames of Nozomi, Yukina and Ai. She is the adopted daughter of Haruka Misono, the president of Tokorozawa, but had never revealed her identity to Nozomi and her friends. She is actually an alien from the future and her true form is a small, yellow octopus-like creature.

=== Tokorozawa and Higashimurayama ===
Masami Utoku (宇徳 真茶未, Utoku Masami)
Voiced by: Ayumi Fujimura (Japanese); Colleen Clinkenbeard (English)
A Best who fights for Tokorozawa as the green-suited superhero "Maccha Green" (マッチャグリーン, Matcha Gurīn), though everyone but Nozomi has correctly guessed that they are the same person. Heavily injured after fighting with Kuniko.
Kuniko Shigyo (執行 玖仁子, Shigyō Kuniko)
Voiced by: Fuyuka Oura (Japanese); Jamie Marchi (English)
A "legendary executioner" from the Great Tokyo War who wields a giant safety pin in combat. A rival from Masami's past who fights her as a Best of Higashi Murayama until their last battle ends with them both in a hospital.
Yukari Otonashi (音無 ゆかり, Otonashi Yukari)
Voiced by: Nozomi Furuki (Japanese); Trina Nishimura (English)
Kuniko's top subordinate.
Haruka Misono (御園 ハルカ, Misono Haruka)
Voiced by: Sayaka Ohara (Japanese); Rachel Robinson (English)
President of Tokorozawa and Chiaya's adopted mother. Much like Chiaya, she is also an alien, but from a different species. She is gathering heart stones so that when the time comes, she can return Chiaya home to her real family. She is overprotective of Chiaya keeping her confined to her home with Momiyama, worried that she would get in trouble if she had revealed her true form to others. Her true form is a squid-like alien.
Kuranosuke Momiyama (籾山 蔵之介, Momiyama Kuranosuke)
Voiced by: Tomokazu Seki (Japanese); Tyson Rinehart (English)
Chiaya's caretaker back at home. He secretly follows the girls on their journey under orders by Haruka to bring Chiaya back home.
Hinayo Moritomo (森友 日向代, Moritomo Hinayo)
Voiced by: Yuki Masuda (Japanese); Morgan Garrett (English)
Nozomi's mother and Tomomori's wife.
Tomomori Moritomo (森友 友守, Moritomo Tomomori)
Voiced by: Hiroki Tōchi (Japanese); Eric Vale (English)
Nozomi's father and Hinayo's husband.
Hiyoshi Town Propellers members

- Crocodile (クロコダイル, Kurokodairu), Voiced by: Hiromichi Tezuka (Japanese); Aaron Dismuke (English),
- Mii-tan (みいたん, Mii-tan), Voiced by: Shiho Kokido (Japanese); Apphia Yu (English)
- Rikako (リカコ, Rikako), Voiced by: Ami Naitō (Japanese); Terri Doty (English)
- Hitoshi (ひとし, Hitoshi), Voiced by: Daiki Yamashita (Japanese); Dallas Reid (English)
- Mario (まり夫, Mario), Voiced by: Juri Kimura (Japanese); Ryan Reynolds (English)
- Den-san (田さん, Den-san), Voiced by: Shinya Takahashi (Japanese); Christopher Bevins (English)
- Noboru (のぼる, Noboru), Voiced by: Takuma Nagatsuka (Japanese); Orion Pitts (English)
- Yumi (ユミ, Yumi), Voiced by: Saki Tokuhiro (Japanese); Kristi Kang (English)

=== Always Comima ===
- Aki Habara (羽原 アキ, Habara Aki), Voiced by: Mika Kanai (Japanese); Lindsay Seidel (English): Best of Always Comima and the leader of the Knights of the Twin Towers, the "cosplay security squad", who goes by the name "Thunderoad". An otaku obsessed with the anime "Fighting Buddies: Rick and Shaw".
- Noriko Suzumoto (鈴本 のり子, Suzumoto Noriko), Voiced by: Kei Shindō (Japanese); Elizabeth Maxwell (English): Member of the Knights of the Twin Towers.
- Aya Suzumoto (鈴本 文, Suzumoto Aya), Voiced by: Yūko Mizutani (Japanese); Kristin Sutton (English): Mother of Noriko Suzumoto.
- Ryuunosuke Akutabi (芥火竜之介, Akutabi Ryuunosuke): Cameo appearances only character. An author who temporary resides at the Suzumoto Mansion.
- Banko (ばん子, Banko), Voiced by: Ayuka (Japanese); Kara Edwards (English)
- Sumire (すみれ, Sumire), Voiced by: Kanami Satō (Japanese); Tia Ballard (English)
- Ken (ケン, Ken), Voiced by: Yoshiaki Hasegawa (Japanese); Kyle Phillips (English)
- Tatsuhiko (たつ 彦, Tatsuhiko), Voiced by: Shinya Hamazoe (Japanese); Scott Freeman (his final voice role) (English)

=== Aichi and Mie ===
- Tomoki Suzuka (鈴鹿 友亀, Suzuka Tomoki), Voiced by: Yoshimasa Hosoya (Japanese); Clifford Chapin (English): Best of Mie Motors, operates a free bike taxi service and seeks peace with Aichi.
- Himeko Uotora (魚虎 姫子, Uotora Himeko), Voiced by: Hiromi Igarashi (Japanese); Caitlin Glass (English)
- Mamoru Uotora (魚虎 守, Uotora Mamoru), Voiced by: Shinpachi Tsuji (Japanese); John Swasey (English)
- Dandy (ダンディ, Dandi), Voiced by: Akio Otsuka (Japanese); J. Michael Tatum (English): Best of Aichi Tenmusu

=== Kyoto ===
- Misa Ichijō (一条 美沙, Ichijō Misa), Voiced by: Mai Nakahara (Japanese); Brina Palencia (English): Best of Kamo Rockers
- Mamechiyo (豆千代), Voiced by: Saori Hayami (Japanese); Alexis Tipton (English)
- Shutendōji (酒呑童子), Voiced by: Katsuyuki Konishi (Japanese); David Matranga (English)

=== Hiroshima and Okayama ===
- Kaguya Nayotake (名余竹 輝夜, Nayotake Kaguya), Voiced by: Shizuka Itō (Japanese); Jessica Cavanagh (English)
- Shima Ishizukuri (石作 志麻, Ishizukuri Shima), Voiced by: Masako Katsuki (Japanese); Stephanie Young (English): Leader of Ishizukuri Stones.
- Kishō Ōtomo (大伴 貴将, Ōtomo Kishō), Voiced by: Tōru Ōkawa (Japanese); Robert McCollum (English)
- Momo Fujiwara (藤原 桃, Fujiwara Momo), Voiced by: Reina Ueda (Japanese); Lara Woodhull (English): She is the adopted daughter of Haru Fujiwara.
- Haru Fujiwara (藤原 春, Fujiwara Haru), Voiced by: Atsuko Tanaka (Japanese); Emily Neves (English)
- Ura Kukino (九鬼 温羅, Kukino Ura), Voiced by: Chisa Yokoyama (Japanese); Bryn Apprill (English): She is the real mother of Momo Fujiwara, she is also the leader of the Okayama Demons.
- Fubito Kuramochi (車持 不比等, Kuramochi Fubito), Voiced by: Tomomichi Nishimura (Japanese); Brandon Potter (English)

== Media ==
=== Manga ===
The manga series is the backstory of the anime series, written by Yōsuke Miyagi and with art by Bonkara began serialization in Mag Garden's Monthly Comic Garden from October 4, 2014. It also began online serialization in Mag Garden's seinen manga magazine ONLINE MAGAZINE comic BLADE from October 30, 2014.

A 4-panel manga adaptation titled Ro~lling Gi~rls Inspiration x Traveler, with art by Sheepbox, also began serialization in Mag Garden's ONLINE MAGAZINE comic BLADE from October 27, 2014.

=== Anime ===
An anime television series produced by Wit Studio was announced by Pony Canyon that aired in 2015. The series premiered in Japan on MBS and other stations.

The opening and closing songs are both covers of tracks from seminal Japanese punk rock band The Blue Hearts, "Hito ni Yasashiku" and "Tsuki no Bakugekiki" respectively. Several of the episodes share titles with tracks by The Blue Hearts including "Kitai Hazure no Hito", "Hoshi o Kudasai" and "Yoru no Tōzokudan".

No.	Title	Original release date
1	"King of Rookies" "Kingu Obu Rūkī" (キング・オブ・ルーキー)	January 10, 2015
The Bests of Higashi Murayama and Tokorozawa face off in a public park. A "trainee" Rest named Nozomi arrives late with some dango from her family's restaurant, until the Rest on both sides are all blown away by the force of Maccha Green's attack. The next day, an absent-minded girl crashes her bike into the headquarters of the Hiroshi Town Propellers, and reveals that she had traveled for three days straight despite living in the same town. Masami accidentally meets Kuniko while eating at a nearby ramen shop, and ends up challenging her to an unofficial ramen-eating contest. The Propellers then find a bus waiting to take them to a local amusement park, only to trapped on the roller coaster as hostages for Higashi Murayama.
2	"Center of the World" "Sekai no Man'naka" (世界のまん中)	January 17, 2015
Masami races to the scene as the Hiroshi Town Propellers face certain doom, trapped on a roller coaster after Takumi blew up part of the track. Masami refuses to fight Kuniko without Maccha Green, but discovers that everyone except Nozomi has seen through her ruse. As the roller coaster hurtles down the tracks, Masami runs off to change into her Maccha Green outfit while a Rest from Higashi Murayama tries (and fails) to stop the coaster. At the last moment, the Propellers fly away to safety while Maccha Green arrives just in time to save Nozomi and Yukina. Kuniko has a brief flashback to her past but then decides to fight Masami anyway. The force of their battle becomes so dangerous that they end up in the same hospital for two months, while President Misono decides to keep both of their heart-shaped jewels. The next day, Nozomi and Yukina decide to travel across the country and grow stronger so they won't have to rely on Masami all the time. Before they leave, they are quickly joined by former Higashi Murayama Rest, Ai, and a girl in a gas mask named Chihaya.
3	"I Wanna Be A Hero" "Eiyū ni Akogarete" (英雄にあこがれて)	January 24, 2015
The land of Always Comima, formed under the shadow of the Twin Towers in Tokyo, is protected by a cosplay security squad and led by a Best named Thunderoad. As Thunderoad accidentally loses her heart-shaped power stone in the wig of a life-sized "Rick" model, she receives another threatening message from a terrorist group called Dynamite Bomber. Later, Nozomi and her group travel into Always Comima, but after revealing their own power stone to a couple of Knights, are quickly arrested by Thunderoad. Thunderoad believes the missing stone was stolen by Dynamite Bomber and demands they return it or they will face capital punishment. Nozomi and her group try searching the area but fail to find the stone. Meanwhile, Thunderoad laments over not having the cash to buy the life-sized Rick model, but after her pet crow discovers the missing stone, she decides to sell both her stone and the one Chiaya carried to Kuranoske for the cash to buy it.
4	"Dream" "Yume" (夢)	January 31, 2015
Thunderoad's assistant Noriko decides to help Nozomi's group hide out for the night, summarizing the history of Always Comima. Elsewhere, Thunderoad looks at her new purchase of the life-sized Rick model, but soon regrets her action and takes one of the stones back from Kuranoske. However, she immediately trips and drops the stone off the bridge, whereupon a roomba sucks it up. Thunderoad decides to head to Noriko's house and begs her and Nozomi's group to help find the stone, but soon another crisis emerges when some Rest from Higashi Murayama realized their prank roomba was packed with live explosives by Takumi. As security recalls all the roombas in the town, Nozomi manages to find the one with the stone, and the bomb-filled roomba latches on to the life-sized Rick model, forcing Thunderoad to tearfully take them both out before it explodes. Afterwards, Noriko admits that Dynamite Bomber was a group she invented so that Aki would stay with the Knights of the Twin Towers, and Thunderoad decides to hand off the Best duties to her. Though she gives Chihaya the stone, Chihaya decides to give it right back to Noriko, saying she needs it more.
5	"Disappointing Person" "Kitai Hazure no Hito" (期待はずれの人)	February 7, 2015
A girl named Himeko arrives home just as her father's project and similar-looking statues around Mie and Aichi explode at the same time. After nearly being crushed by a flying piece of debris, Nozomi and her group arrive in a land linked in an uneasy peace between the Mie Motors and the Aichi Tenmusus. Soon after arriving, the group is caught and dragged into a nearby restaurant where they meet with Himeko, seeking her reason for asking Maccha Green's help. However, the vice-chief of Mie Motors crashes through a window on his motorcycle and picks a fight with Dandy, the owner of the restaurant, which he refuses to take. After the biker leaves, Dandy suggests that Nozomi look for the leader of Mie. Later that night, Himeko's neighbors reminisce about the conflict between Mie and Aichi, while Himeko considers helping her ailing father until she discovers her father was exaggerating his illness to guilt her into running the family business. Elsewhere, the vice-chief and his allies challenge Tomoki for his Best position, but he refuses, speeding off past them and the Aichi servers who seek revenge for their damaged restaurant. Tomoki later runs into Himeko outside as the two of them are dragged into a nearby restaurant.
6	"Lightning Speed" "Denkō Sekka" (電光石火)	February 14, 2015
7	"Please Give Me a Star" "Hoshi o Kudasai" (星をください)	February 21, 2015
8	"After the Rain" "Ame Agari" (雨上がり)	February 28, 2015
9	"Night Thieves" "Yoru no Tōzokudan" (夜の盗賊団)	March 7, 2015
10	"NO NO NO"	March 14, 2015
11	"Rose of Passion" "Jōnetsu no Bara" (情熱の薔薇)	March 21, 2015
12	"The Future is in Our Hands" "Mirai wa Bokura no Te no Naka" (未来は僕等の手の中)	March 28, 2015
