= Eiko Segawa =

Japanese female enka singer (born 1948)

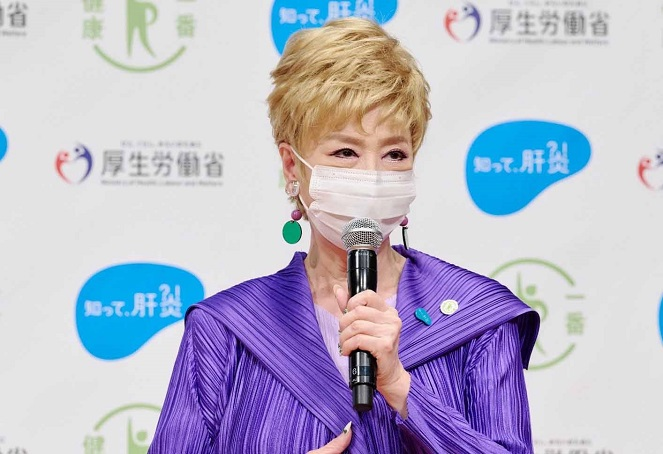
- 25 July 2022

Background information
- Born: Eiko Segawa; 6 July 1947 (age 78)
- Origin: Shibuya, Tokyo, Japan
- Genres: Enka
- Occupation: Singer
- Years active: 1967–present
- Website: www.e-segawa.co.jp

Eiko Segawa (瀬川瑛子; born 6 July 1947 in Shibuya, Tokyo) is a Japanese female enka singer. She is affiliated with the talent agency NoReason Inc. Her 1986 single "Inochi Kurenai" reached No.2 on the Japanese Oricon charts and sold 692,000 copies.

== Discography ==
- Nagasaki no yoru ha murasaki (長崎の夜はむらさき, The night in Nagasaki is purple) : 1970
- Inochi Kurenai (命くれない, We share the fire) : 1986
- Jinsei haretari kumottari (人生晴れたり曇ったり, Shining days and gloomy days of life) : 1990
