= Stick Out =

Studio album by The Blue Hearts
- Released: February 10, 1993
- Studio: Avaco Creative Studio
- Genre: Punk rock, alternative rock
- Length: 41:40
- Language: Japanese
- Label: East West Japan
- Producer: Yu Imai

The Blue Hearts chronology
High Kicks	Stick Out	Dug Out

Singles from Stick Out
- 1. "Yume" Released: October 25, 1992; 2. "Tabibito" Released: February 25, 1993; 3. "1000 no Violin" Released: May 25, 1993

Stick Out (スティック・アウト, Sutikku Auto) is the sixth studio album released by Japanese rock band The Blue Hearts. It was also the second consecutive album by the band to reach #1 on the Oricon charts.

== Track listing ==
1. "Sutegoma" (すてごま Sacrifice)
2. "Yume" (夢 Dreams)
3. "Tabibito" (旅人 Travelers)
4. "Kitai Hazure no Hito" (期待はずれの人 Disappointed People)
5. "Yaru ka Nigeru ka" (やるか逃げるか Do It or Go Away)
6. "Tetrapod no Ue" (テトラポットの上 On a Tetrapod)
7. "Taifū" (台風 Typhoon)
8. "Inspiration" (インスピレーション)
9. "Ore wa Ore no Shi o Shinitai" (俺は俺の死を死にたい I Want to Die My Death)
10. "44 Kōkei" (44口径 44 Diameter)
11. "Usotsuki" (うそつき Liar)
12. "Tsuki no Bakugekiki" (月の爆撃機 Moon Bomber)
13. "1000 no Violin" (1000のバイオリン 1000 Violins)
