= Ano Ko ni Touch =

Single by The Blue Hearts

from the album High Kicks
- A-side: "'Ano Ko ni Touch'"
- B-side: "'Waa Waa'"
- Released: November 28, 1991
- Recorded: Avaco Creative Studio
- Genre: Rock
- Length: 5m25s
- Label: East West Japan
- Songwriter(s): Hiroto Kōmoto
- Producer(s): The Blue Hearts

The Blue Hearts singles chronology
"Kubitsuri-dai Kara" (1991)	"Ano Ko ni Touch" (1991)	"Too Much Pain" (1992)

"Ano Ko ni Touch" (あの娘にタッチ, Touch That Girl) was the eleventh single by the Japanese band The Blue Hearts and reached #24 on the Oricon charts in 1991.

== Details ==
"Ano Ko ni Touch" was released as part of The Blue Hearts' fifth album, High Kicks, which was released shortly after the single on December 21. The promotional video for the song was filmed in Los Angeles.

The B-side track, "Waa Waa" (わーわー), was a live version of the recording. It was written by the band's guitarist Masatoshi Mashima. It is unknown if this song was ever actually recorded in a studio, as only live versions of it have been included on albums.
