= Kubitsuri-dai Kara =

Single by The Blue Hearts

from the album Bust Waste Hip
- A-side: "Kubitsuri-dai Kara"
- B-side: "Cinderella (From the Ashes)"
- Released: April 10, 1991
- Recorded: Avaco Creative Studio
- Genre: Rock
- Length: 7m26s
- Label: East West Japan
- Songwriter(s): Hiroto Kōmoto
- Producer(s): The Blue Hearts

The Blue Hearts singles chronology
"Jōnetsu no Bara" (1990)	"Kubitsuri-dai Kara" (1991)	"Ano Ko ni Touch" (1991)

"Kubitsuri-dai Kara" (首つり台から, From the Hangman's Block) was the tenth single by the Japanese rock band The Blue Hearts and reached #13 on the Oricon charts in 1991.

== Details ==
"Kubitsuri-dai Kara" was released as part of The Blue Hearts' fourth album, Bust Waste Hip, which had been released during the previous year on September 10, 1990, though the arrangement of the song is slightly different.

"Cinderella (From the Ashes)" (シンデレラ（灰の中から） Shinderera (Hai no Naka Kara)) was written by Junnosuke Kawaguchi, the band's bassist. Though the band's vocalist, Hiroto Kōmoto, sings most of the lyrics, Kawaguchi sings during the slow tempo. This song was featured in Noriyuki Higashiyama's 1991 film, Maji! (本気！ Really!).
