= Tetsuya Kajiwara (musician) =

Japanese drummer (born 1963)

Tetsuya Kajiwara 梶原 徹也
- Born: September 26, 1963 (age 61); Fukuoka, Japan
- Genres: Punk rock
- Occupation(s): Musician, producer
- Instrument: Drums
- Years active: 1986–present
- Labels: Cicada Peaks
- Formerly of: The Blue Hearts; The 3Peace; The Big Hip
- Website: Official Blog

Tetsuya Kajiwara (梶原 徹也, Kajiwara Tetsuya; born September 26, 1963) is a Japanese drummer who has performed with The Blue Hearts and The 3Peace.

== Biography ==
Kajiwara was born in Fukuoka, Fukuoka Prefecture, Japan, and graduated from Oita Uenogaoka High School in Oita, Oita Prefecture. He then moved to Tokyo's Suginami ward to study at Takachiho University. During university, he lived in student dormitories and was part of a group of musicians for other universities, including Waseda and Meiji, forming a few different bands as a student.

He first met The Blue Hearts while working at a club. When he heard that the band's original drummer had quit in April 1986, he phoned Hiroto Kōmoto, the band's lead vocalist, and received an audition. During his audition, his loud count of "One, two, three, four!" impressed the band members and was later told by the manager that he was chosen because of that.

After his time with The Blue Hearts, Kajiwara was a member of The 3peace and of the band that played backup to Ai Otsuka, after which he began performing with The Big Hip. Most recently, he has started up a record label and is producing music.
