= The Blue Hearts =

Japanese punk rock band

- Origin: Shibuya, Tokyo, Japan
- Genre: Punk rock
- Years active: 1985–1995
- Labels: Meldac (1987–1989), East West Japan (1989–1995)
- Members: Hiroto Kōmoto; Masatoshi Mashima; Junnosuke Kawaguchi; Tetsuya Kajiwara
- Past members: Masami Mochizuki; Ryūsuke Hanabusa; Norio Yamakawa
- Website: 30th Anniversary website

The Blue Hearts (Japanese: ザ・ブルーハーツ, Hepburn: Za Burū Hātsu) was a Japanese punk rock band active from 1985 to 1995. They have been compared to such bands as the Sex Pistols, the Clash and the Ramones. In 2003, HMV ranked them at number 19 on their list of 100 most important Japanese pop acts. In September 2007, Rolling Stone Japan rated their self-titled debut album number 3 on its list of the "100 Greatest Japanese Rock Albums of All Time".

== Career ==
Its members were Hiroto Kōmoto (vocalist), Masatoshi Mashima (guitarist), Junnosuke Kawaguchi (bassist) and Tetsuya Kajiwara (drummer). Mikio Shirai was not an official member of the band, but often toured with them as their keyboardist. Formed in 1985, the group made its major debut in May 1987, and released its first album, the self-titled The Blue Hearts, and followed that up with seven more albums. Though they started on an independent label, each album sold more copies than the previous one, with their last recording selling in the millions. In 1990, The Blue Hearts had a self-titled EP released in the United States, which they supported with a US tour.

In addition to having popular albums, they also had many popular singles. Two of the most well-known are "Train-Train" and "Linda Linda", which can be found on many karaoke machines. A cover version of "Linda Linda" was used in the 2004 dramas Socrates in Love and Gachi Baka, as well as the 2005 film Linda Linda Linda, the plot of which centers on a high school girls' band practicing The Blue Hearts' songs for the finale concert of their school's culture festival. The song also appears in the 2005 Nintendo DS video game Osu! Tatakae! Ouendan,. Other songs, including "Train-Train", "Owaranai Uta" and "Hito ni Yasashiku", have been featured in the Konami arcade games Drummania and Guitar Freaks. The 2015 anime series The Rolling Girls features covers of several Blue Hearts songs sung by the cast, including covers of "Hito ni Yasashiku" and "Tsuki no Bakugekiki" in the opening and ending sequences.

They were seen as controversial in Japan, where antics such as using "Kichigai" (気違い), the taboo, broadcast-prohibited Japanese word for "Lunatic", during a performance of their song "Owaranai Uta", and spitting on television cameras got them banned from TV for a year.

== Post-breakup ==
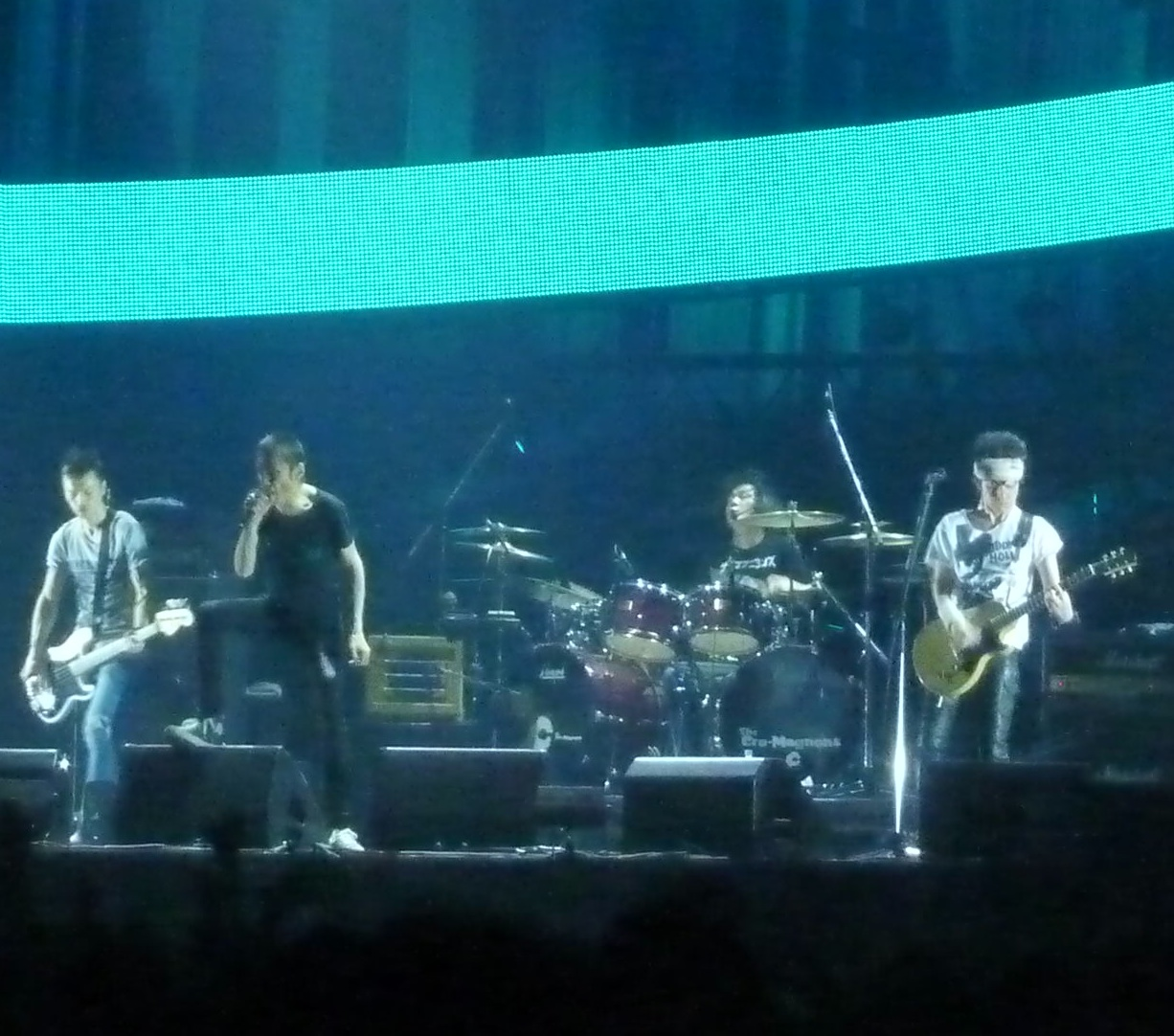
The Cro-Magnons live in Japan, 2011

After The Blue Hearts broke up in 1995, Kōmoto, Mashima and Shirai formed a new group, The High-Lows. In addition to retaining the hardcore fans of The Blue Hearts, The High-Lows were also able to attract new fans and lasted another ten years. When The High-Lows broke up in 2005, Kōmoto and Mashima again formed a new band in 2006, this time calling themselves The Cro-Magnons. Kawaguchi became a record producer and occasionally plays support for several bands, in 2009 he became the deputy director of propaganda for the Happiness Realization Party. Kajiwara formed The 3Peace in 1997, then The Big Hip in 2005 with Shirai, and his solo project Thunderbeat in 2008.

After the breakup of The Blue Hearts, both Kōmoto and Mashima chose not to sing any of the band's songs, with few exceptions. Kōmoto has sung "Boku no Migite" while performing live with other artists, and Mashima has occasionally performed "Aozora".

== Members ==
- Hiroto Kōmoto – vocals, harmonica
- Masatoshi Mashima – guitar, backing vocals
- Junnosuke Kawaguchi – bass, backing vocals
- Tetsuya Kajiwara – drums
- Mikio Shirai – keyboards (support member)

Former members

- Masami Mochizuki (望月正水) – bass
- Ryūsuke Hanabusa (英竜介) – drums
- Norio Yamakawa (山川のりを) – bass

== Discography ==
=== Singles ===
- "1985" (A free flexi-disc given away at a live performance on December 24, 1985.)
- "Hito ni Yasashiku" (February 25, 1987)
- "Linda Linda" (May 1, 1987)
- "Kiss Shite Hoshii" (November 21, 1987)
- "Blue Hearts Theme" (July 1, 1988)
- "Chernobyl" (July 1, 1988)
- "Train-Train" (November 23, 1988)
- "Love Letter" (February 21, 1989)
- "Aozora" (June 21, 1989)
- "Jōnetsu no Bara" (July 25, 1990)
- "Kubitsuri-dai Kara" (April 10, 1991)
- "Ano Ko ni Touch" (November 28, 1991)
- "Too Much Pain" (March 10, 1992)
- "Yume" (October 25, 1992)
- "Tabibito" (February 25, 1993)
- "1000 no Violin" (May 25, 1993)
- "Party" (August 25, 1993)
- "Yūgure" (October 25, 1993)

=== Studio albums ===
- The Blue Hearts (May 21, 1987)
- Young and Pretty (November 21, 1987)
- Train-Train (November 23, 1988)
- Bust Waste Hip (September 10, 1990)
- High Kicks (December 21, 1991)
- Stick Out (February 10, 1993)
- Dug Out (July 10, 1993)
- Pan (July 10, 1995)

=== Live albums ===
- Live All Sold Out (July 1, 1996, various locations)
- Yaon Live on '94 6.18/19 (November 25, 1997)

=== Compilation albums ===
- Blast Off! (August 6, 1991, US only)
- Meet the Blue Hearts (January 1, 1995)
- East West Side Story (September 25, 1995)
- Super Best (October 16, 1995)
- The Blue Hearts Box (January 1, 1999)
- Singles 1990-1993 (November 25, 1999)
- All Time Singles ~Super Premium Best~ (February 24, 2010)
- All Time Memorials ~Super Selected Songs~ (February 4, 2015)

=== Videos ===
- The Blue Hearts (March 21, 1987) VHS
- The Blue Hearts Live! ~1987.7.4 Hibiya Yagai Ongakudō~ (September 1, 1987) VHS
- Tour '88 Pretty Pineapple Special (June 21, 1988) VHS
- Blue Hearts no Video - Video Clip 1987-1989 (ブルーハーツのビデオ) (January 1, 1990) VHS
- Meet the Blue Hearts U.S.A. Tour 1990 (1990) VHS
- High Kick Tour Video Pamphlet (1991) VHS
- Zen-Nippon East Waste Tour '91 (全日本EAST WASTE TOUR '91) (September 10, 1991) VHS/DVD
- Endless Dreams ~The Blue Hearts Meet the Mutoid~ (July 10, 1993) VHS
- Blue Hearts no Video 2 - Video Clip 1990-1993 (ブルーハーツのビデオ2) (November 10, 1993) VHS/DVD
- The Blue Hearts no Dekoboko Chindōchū (ザ・ブルーハーツの凸凹珍道中) (July 10, 1995) VHS/DVD
- Blue Hearts ga Kikoenai - History of the Blue Hearts (ブルーハーツが聴こえない History of the Blue Hearts) (February 7, 1996) VHS/DVD
- Blue Hearts no Video + Maboroshi no Video Fukkokuban (ブルーハーツのビデオ+幻のビデオ復刻版) (May 26, 2004) DVD
- The Blue Hearts Live! (May 26, 2004) DVD (Incl. "The Blue Hearts Live!" + "Tour '88 Pretty Pineapple Special")

=== Others ===
- Just a Beat Show (omnibus album with other groups, May 1986)
- The Blue Hearts King of Mix (remix album by various groups, May 25, 1994)
- The Blue Hearts Tribute (tribute album, April 25, 2002)
- The Blue Hearts 2002 Tribute (tribute album, August 28, 2002)
- The Blue Hearts Super Tribute (tribute album, April 2, 2003)
- The Blue Hearts Tribute 2005 Edition (tribute album, July 20, 2005)
- The Blue Hearts "25th Anniversary" Tribute (tribute album, February 24, 2010)
- 30th Anniversary The Blue Hearts Re-mix 'Re-spect (tribute album, January 27, 2016)
