= Party (The Blue Hearts song) =

Single by The Blue Hearts

from the album Dug Out
- A-side: "Party"
- B-side: "Chance"
- Released: August 25, 1993
- Recorded: Avaco Creative Studio
- Genre: Rock
- Length: 10m03s
- Label: East West Japan
- Songwriter(s): Hiroto Kōmoto
- Producer(s): The Blue Hearts

The Blue Hearts singles chronology
"1000 no Violin" (1993)	"Party" (1993)	"Yūgure" (1993)

Party (パーティー, Paatii) was the sixteenth single by the Japanese band The Blue Hearts and reached #80 on the Oricon charts in 1993. It was part of the band's seventh album, Dug Out, and was the worst selling single that was released by a major label for the band. The music and lyrics were written by Hiroto Kōmoto.

== Details ==
In addition to the original versions of "Party" and the B-side track "Chance" (チャンス Chansu), karaoke versions of both songs were also included on the CD. "Chance" was written by Masatoshi Mashima.
