= Dug Out =

Studio album by The Blue Hearts
- Released: July 10, 1993
- Recorded: Avaco Creative Studio; Studio Sound Dali; Sedic Studio; Sound Inn; New Orleans Recording Studio
- Genre: Punk rock, alternative rock
- Length: 51:10
- Language: Japanese
- Label: East West Japan
- Producer: Yu Imai

The Blue Hearts chronology
Stick Out	Dug Out	Pan

Singles from Stick Out
- 1. "Party" Released: August 25, 1993; 2. "Yūgure" Released: October 25, 1993

Dug Out (ダグ・アウト, Dagu Auto) is the seventh studio album released by the Japanese rock band The Blue Hearts and the eighth album released overall.

== Tracks ==
1. "Tegami" (手紙 Letter)
2. "Midori no Happa" (緑のハッパ Green Leaf)
3. "Torch Song" (トーチソング Tōchi Songu)
4. "Ame Agari" (雨上がり After the Rain)
5. "Toshi o Torō" (年をとろう Get Older)
6. "Yoru no Tōzokudan" (夜の盗賊団 Night Thieves)
7. "King of Rookie" (キング・オブ・ルーキー Kingu obu Rūkii)
8. "Muchi to Manto" (ムチとマント Whip and Cloak)
9. "Takaramono" (宝もの Treasures)
10. "Yūgure" (夕暮れ Twilight)
11. "Party" (パーティー Paatii)
12. "Chance" (チャンス Chansu)
