= Junnosuke Kawaguchi =

Japanese musician (born 1961)

Junnosuke Kawaguchi 河口 純之助
- Born: Hiroyuki Kawaguchi; April 26, 1961 (age 65); Setagaya, Tokyo, Japan
- Genre: Punk rock
- Occupations: Musician, bassist, record producer
- Instruments: Bass guitar, vocals
- Years active: 1985–present

Junnosuke Kawaguchi (河口 純之助, Kawaguchi Junnosuke; b. April 26, 1961) is a Japanese musician, best known as bassist of The Blue Hearts. He is a music producer in Tokyo, and in 2009 became the deputy director of propaganda for the Happiness Realization Party. He was born Hiroyuki Kawaguchi (河口 宏之 Kawaguchi Hiroyuki) in the Setagaya ward of Tokyo.

== History ==
Kawaguchi had intended on being The Blue Hearts' manager, but when the original bassist left the group in August 1985, he stepped in to help, eventually becoming a band member.
