= Yugure (song) =

"Yūgure"

Single by The Blue Hearts

from the album Dug Out
- A-side: "'Yūgure'"
- B-side: Sutegoma; Yoru no Tōzokudan
- Released: October 25, 1993
- Recorded: Avaco Creative Studio
- Genre: Rock
- Length: 12m11s
- Label: East West Japan
- Songwriter(s): Hiroto Kōmoto
- Producer(s): The Blue Hearts

The Blue Hearts singles chronology
"'Party'" (1993)	"Yūgure" (1993)

"Yūgure" (夕暮れ, Twilight) was the seventeenth and final single by the Japanese band The Blue Hearts and reached #80 on the Oricon charts in 1993. It was part of the band's seventh album, Dug Out. The music and lyrics were written by Hiroto Kōmoto.

== Details ==
The first B-side track is Sutegoma (すてごま Sacrifice) is a live version of the song recorded on Stick Out, the band's sixth album.

The second B-side track, Yoru no Tōzokudan (夜の盗賊団 Night Thieves), was written by Masatoshi Mashima.
