= Blue Hearts Theme =

Single by The Blue Hearts

from the album Young and Pretty
- A-side: Blue Hearts Theme; Chernobyl
- B-side: "'Sha La La'"
- Released: July 1, 1988; April 25, 2002 (rerelease)
- Recorded: Onkio Haus
- Genre: Punk rock
- Length: 9m17s
- Label: independent
- Songwriter: Hiroto Kōmoto
- Producer: The Blue Hearts

The Blue Hearts singles chronology
| "'Kiss Shite Hoshii'" (1987) | "Blue Hearts Theme" (1988) | "'Train-Train'" (1988) |

"Blue Hearts Theme" (ブルーハーツのテーマ, Burū Hātsu no Tēma) was the fourth single by the Japanese band The Blue Hearts. Though it was released after their major debut, it was written before they signed with a major label. It was released as a "double A-side" track on July 1, 1988, with "Chernobyl" (チェルノブイリ), a controversial single that was included with the release. Lyrics and music were written by Hiroto Kōmoto, the band's lead vocalist, and was arranged by The Blue Hearts. It was not included in any albums other than compilation albums. The track is 9 minutes 17 seconds in length.

"Chernobyl" caused controversy because it was a song protesting the nuclear industry. At the time, the band was signed with Meldac Records, which was supported by Mitsubishi, who was heavily invested in the nuclear industry. Instead of bowing to pressure to drop the song, they left the label and produced the song independently, leading to their eventual signing with East West Japan.

Though there are three songs on the release, the actual B-side track was "Sha La La" (シャララ), which was also written by Kōmoto. "Chernobyl" was written by Masatoshi Mashima, the band's guitarist. Originally, "Too Much Pain" was to be included, instead of "Sha La La", but the sound of the song did not fit as well as "Sha La La".

== Charts ==
The single reached number 39 on the Oricon Singles Chart.

== See also ==
- 1988 in Japanese music
