= Tabibito =

Single by The Blue Hearts

from the album Stick Out
- A-side: "'Tabibito'"
- B-side: "'Taifū'"
- Released: February 25, 1993
- Recorded: Avaco Creative Studio
- Genre: Rock
- Length: 5m34s
- Label: East West Japan
- Songwriter: Hiroto Kōmoto
- Producer: The Blue Hearts

The Blue Hearts singles chronology
"'Yume'" (1992)	"Tabibito" (1993)	"'1000 no Violin'" (1993)

"Tabibito" (旅人, Traveler) was the fourteenth single by the Japanese band The Blue Hearts and reached #50 on the Oricon charts in 1992. It was part of the band's sixth album, Stick Out.

== Details ==
The B-side track, "Taifū" (台風 Typhoon), is one of the rare songs by The Blue Hearts that uses irregular meter.
