= Hito ni Yasashiku =

Single by The Blue Hearts
- A-side: "'Hito ni Yasashiku'"
- B-side: "'Hammer (48-oku no Blues)'"
- Released: February 25, 1987; February 6, 2002 (rerelease)
- Recorded: Sound Inn
- Genre: Punk rock
- Length: 5m26s
- Label: Juggler; Meldac Records
- Songwriter: Hiroto Kōmoto
- Producer: The Blue Hearts

The Blue Hearts singles chronology
"Hito ni Yasashiku" (1987)	"'Linda Linda'" (1987)

"Hito ni Yasashiku" (人にやさしく, Be Kind to People) was the first single by the Japanese band The Blue Hearts. It was first released on an independent label on February 25, 1987, before the band signed with a record company. Lyrics and music were written by Hiroto Kōmoto, the band's lead vocalist, and was arranged by The Blue Hearts. The track is 5m26s in length. The cover for the single was designed by Junnosuke Kawaguchi, the band's bassist.

The B-side track on the single was "Hammer (48-oku no Blues)" (ハンマー（48億のブルース）), which was written by Masatoshi Mashima, the band's guitarist.

== Original recording ==
The song was originally released as a single on an independent label. It was again released as a single after the band signed to a record label. The new release, however, was remixed and the original recording can only be found on the analog record of the single.

== Other releases ==
The song was never part of a studio album, but it was included on the following compilations and live albums:

- Just a Beat Show
- Meet the Blue Hearts
- East West Side Story
- Super Best
- Live All Sold Out
- Yaon Live on '94 6.18/19

== Related media ==
The song was featured in a 2002 Fuji Television drama of the same name.

A cover version of the song can be heard being played on GuitarFreaks while Charlotte wanders through the arcade in the film Lost in Translation.

A cover version of the song is the opening theme of the 2015 anime The Rolling Girls.

== See also ==
- 1987 in Japanese music
