= Kiss Shite Hoshii =

Single by The Blue Hearts

from the album Young and Pretty
- B-side: "'Chain Gang'"
- Released: November 21, 1987; February 6, 2002 (rerelease)
- Genre: Punk rock
- Length: 9m17s
- Label: Meldac
- Songwriter: Hiroto Kōmoto
- Producer: The Blue Hearts

The Blue Hearts singles chronology
"'Linda Linda'" (1987)	"Kiss Shite Hoshii" (1987)	"'Blue Hearts Theme'" (1988)

"Kiss Shite Hoshii" (キスしてほしい （トゥー・トゥー・トゥー）, I Want a Kiss (Tou Tou Tou)) was the third single by the Japanese band The Blue Hearts. It was released on November 21, 1987, the same time that the band's second album, Young and Pretty, was released. Lyrics and music were written by Hiroto Kōmoto, the band's lead vocalist, and was arranged by The Blue Hearts. The single is 9m17s in length.

The B-side of the single is "Chain Gang" (チェインギャング, Chein Gyangu), a blues rock song written and sung by Masatoshi Mashima, the band's guitarist.

== Charts ==
The single reached number 48 on the Oricon Singles Chart.

== Original recording ==
The falsetto at the beginning of the song was done by Junnosuke Kawaguchi, the band's bassist. Though he generally speaks with a low voice, he sings in falsetto for a number of songs.

"Chain Gang" was originally planned to be on their debut album, but was shelved due to concern with the lyrics, particularly the line about killing Christ.

== Related media ==
The promotional video was an animated video. In the video, Kōmoto was a monkey, Mashima was a penguin, Kawaguchi was a pig and Tetsuya Kajiwara (the drummer) was a polar bear.

== See also ==
- 1987 in Japanese music
