= Jōnetsu no Bara =

Single by The Blue Hearts

from the album Bust Waste Hip
- A-side: "Jōnetsu no Bara"
- B-side: "Teppō"
- Released: July 25, 1990
- Genre: Rock
- Length: 6m17s
- Label: East West Japan
- Songwriter: Hiroto Kōmoto
- Producer: The Blue Hearts

The Blue Hearts singles chronology
"Aozora" (1989)	"Jōnetsu no Bara" (1990)	"Kubitsuri-dai Kara" (1991)

"Jōnetsu no Bara" (情熱の薔薇, Rose of Passion) was the ninth single by the Japanese rock band The Blue Hearts. It reached #1 on the Oricon charts during the first week of August 1990. The song was also ranked #7 on Oricon's rankings for all of 1990. It was the drama High School Rakugaki, part 2.

== Details ==
"Jōnetsu no Bara" was released as part of The Blue Hearts' fourth album, Bust Waste Hip, which was released shortly afterwards on September 10, 1990, though the arrangement of the song is slightly different.

"Teppō" (鉄砲 Gun), the B-side track, was written by Masatoshi Mashima, the band's guitarist. It is one of the few songs that the band has not performed during a concert.

== Cover ==
The title track was covered by Fujin Rizing!, a fictional ska band from multimedia franchise Argonavis from BanG Dream! and added in the game started on February 19, 2021.

Also covered by Banda Basotti an Italian SKA band.

== See also ==
- 1990 in Japanese music
