= 1000 no Violin =

Single by the Blue Hearts

from the album Stick Out
- B-side: "Ore wa Ore no Shi o Shinitai"; "1001 no Violin"
- Released: February 25, 1993
- Recorded: Avaco Creative Studio
- Genre: Rock
- Length: 3:48
- Label: East West Japan
- Songwriter(s): Masatoshi Mashima
- Producer(s): The Blue Hearts

The Blue Hearts singles chronology
"Tabibito" (1993)	"1000 no Violin" (1993)	"Party" (1993)

"1000 no Violin" (1000のバイオリン, Sen no Baiorin, 1000 Violins) is a song by the Blue Hearts, released as the band's fifteenth single. It reached number 47 on the Oricon charts in 1993. It was part of the band's sixth album, Stick Out. The music and lyrics were written by Masatoshi Mashima.

== Details ==
"Ore wa Ore no Shi o Shinitai" (俺は俺の死を死にたい I Want to Die My Death) was also written by Mashima, who also performed the vocals on this track. This B-side version is slightly different from the version recorded on Stick Out.

"1001 no Violin" is an orchestral version of "1000 no Violin" and was arranged by Asuka Kaneko (金子飛鳥 Kaneko Asuka).
