= Yume (The Blue Hearts song) =

Single by The Blue Hearts

from the album Stick Out
- A-side: "'Yume'"
- B-side: Minagoroshi no Melody; Tokyo Zombie (Russian Roulette)
- Released: October 25, 1992
- Recorded: Avaco Creative Studio
- Genre: Rock
- Length: 7m32s
- Label: East West Japan
- Songwriter(s): Masatoshi Mashima
- Producer(s): The Blue Hearts

The Blue Hearts singles chronology
"Too Much Pain" (1992)	"Yume" (1992)	"Tabibito" (1993)

"Yume" (夢, Dreams) was the thirteenth single by the Japanese band The Blue Hearts and reached #14 on the Oricon charts in 1992. When it was rereleased on February 6, 2002, it again placed on the Oricon charts, peaking at #11.

== Details ==
Neither B-side's, "Minagoroshi no Melody" (皆殺しのメロディー Massacre Melody) nor "Tokyo Zombie (Russian Roulette)" (東京ゾンビ（ロシアンルーレット）), were included on the Stick Out album with "Yume"; they had already been recorded on the previous album High Kicks.

Though "Yume" was recorded in a studio, the B-side tracks were recorded on June 2, 1992, as the opening songs for the final performance of the band's High Kick Tour. However, studio recordings were used for the High Kicks album.
