= Train-Train (album) =

Studio album by The Blue Hearts
- Released: November 23, 1988; November 21, 2007 (limited edition)
- Recorded: Sony Roppongi Studio; Onkio Haus
- Genre: Punk rock
- Length: 43:35
- Language: Japanese
- Label: Meldac Records
- Producer: The Blue Hearts

The Blue Hearts chronology
Young and Pretty	Train-Train	Bust Waste Hip

Singles from Train-Train
- 1. "Train-Train" Released: November 23, 1988; 2. "Love Letter" Released: February 21, 1989; 3. "Aozora" Released: June 21, 1989

Train-Train (トレイン・トレイン, Torein Torein) is the third studio album released by the Japanese band The Blue Hearts.

It was named one of the top albums from 1989 to 1998 in a 2004 issue of the music magazine Band Yarouze.

== Charts ==
The album reached number 3 on the Oricon Albums Chart.

== Track listing ==
1. "Train-Train" (TRAIN-TRAIN)
2. "Merry Go Round" (メリーゴーランド)
3. "Denkō Sekka" (電光石火 Lightning Speed)
4. "Missile" (ミサイル)
5. "Boku no Migite" (僕の右手 My Right Hand)
6. "Mugon Denwa no Burūzu" (無言電話のブルース Silent Telephone Blues)
7. "Fūsen Bakudan" (風船爆弾 Fire Balloon)
8. "Love Letter" (ラブレター)
9. "Nagaremono" (ながれもの Wanderer)
10. "Burūzu o Ketobase" (ブルースをけとばせ Kick the Blues)
11. "Aozora" (青空 Blue Sky)
12. "Omae o Hanasanai" (お前を離さない I Won't Leave You)

== See also ==
- 1988 in Japanese music
