= Aozora (song) =

1989 single by The Blue Hearts

Single by The Blue Hearts

from the album Train-Train
- A-side: "Aozora"
- B-side: "Heisei no Blues"
- Released: June 21, 1989; February 6, 2002 (rerelease)
- Genre: Punk rock
- Length: 14m50s
- Label: Meldac
- Songwriter: Masatoshi Mashima
- Producer: The Blue Hearts

The Blue Hearts singles chronology
| "Love Letter" (1988) | "Aozora" (1989) | "Jōnetsu no Bara" (1990) |

"Aozora" (青空; "Blue Sky") was the eighth single by the Japanese band The Blue Hearts. The song was recut from the group's third album Train-Train. This song was written in opposition to the continuing apartheid of the time. "Heisei no Blues" (平成のブルース), the B-side track, was not on the album Train-Train.

The song was covered by miwa in 2010, for use as the ending theme song of the animated film adaptation of Eto Mori's novel Colorful. Mone Kamishiraishi worked with Glim Spanky on a cover of the song for her 2021 album Ano Uta -2-.

In December 2019, the song was published as a picture book with illustrations by French artist Botchy-Botchy. Publisher is Gendaishokan and is only available in Japanese for the time being. The book also features a 2 pages original text written by Yoshimoto Banana, who is a fan of the band ´The Blue Hearts’.

== Charts ==
The single reached number 8 on the Oricon Singles Chart.

== See also ==
- 1989 in Japanese music
