= Train-Train =

Single by The Blue Hearts

from the album Train-Train
- A-side: "Train-Train"
- B-side: "Mugon Denwa no Blues"
- Released: November 23, 1988; February 6, 2002 (rerelease)
- Recorded: Sony Roppongi Studio; Onkio Haus
- Genre: Punk rock
- Length: 7m51s
- Label: Meldac
- Songwriter: Hiroto Kōmoto
- Producer: The Blue Hearts

The Blue Hearts singles chronology
"Blue Hearts Theme" (1988)	"Train-Train" (1988)	"Love Letter" (1989)

"Train-Train" (トレイン・トレイン, Torein Torein) was the fifth professional single by the Japanese band The Blue Hearts. They had released one single as an independent group, making this the sixth single overall.

== Charts ==
The single reached number 5 on the Oricon Singles Chart.

== Production ==
The single was released at the same time as the album Train-Train. Though the single version and album version of the song were cut from the same take, the single version does not include the train sounds or the blues harp and drums that are played at the beginning of the album version of the song.

== B-side ==
The B-side song to "Train-Train" was "Mugon Denwa no Blues" (無言電話のブルース Silent Telephone Blues). Both of the songs were written by Masatoshi Mashima, the band's guitarist.

== Use in media ==
The song was used as the theme song of the drama High School Rakugaki (はいすくーる落書), pt. 1.

This was an insert song of Ep. 1 of the anime adaptation of O Maidens in Your Savage Season. this song is used as a walk up song, or 'hitting march' in Japanese for Kuramochi Youichi in Ace of Diamond.

== See also ==
- 1988 in Japanese music
