= Linda Linda =

Single by the Blue Hearts

from the album The Blue Hearts
- Language: Japanese
- B-side: "Boku wa Koko ni Tatteiru Yo"
- Released: May 1, 1987
- Genre: Punk rock
- Length: 3:22
- Label: Meldac
- Songwriter: Hiroto Kōmoto

The Blue Hearts singles chronology
"Hito ni Yasashiku" (1987)	"Linda Linda" (1987)	"Kiss Shite Hoshii" (1987)

"Linda Linda" (リンダリンダ) is a single by the Japanese punk rock band the Blue Hearts that was released on May 1, 1987. Lyrics and music were written by Hiroto Kōmoto, the band's lead vocalist, and it was arranged by the Blue Hearts. The track reached No. 38 on the Oricon charts during its release year.

It remains one of the group's most popular songs and was included on many albums. It was rereleased as a single on February 6, 2002.

The B-side track on the single was "Boku wa Koko ni Tatteiru Yo" (僕はここに立っているよ I'm Standing Here), which was written by Masatoshi Mashima, the band's guitarist.

== Original recordings ==
There is a noticeable difference in the guitar arrangement and sound mixing between Linda Linda's release as a single and its release on the album, The Blue Hearts. Band members agreed to this change for the album because it represents a change from their amateur days to a major band playing live concerts. The single version of the song, however, is more common on television and in commercials.

== Related media ==
The song has made many appearances in popular culture, including being central to the plot of the 2005 Japanese movie Linda Linda Linda, which is about a high school girls' band which plays songs of The Blue Hearts.

The song was also recorded by American singer Andrew W.K. on his 2008 cover album, The Japan Covers.

American punk rock cover band Me First and the Gimme Gimmes included the song on their 2011 EP, Sing in Japanese.

American punk rock band MxPx recorded the song in English on their 2009 album On The Cover II. They included a Japanese version as a bonus track on Japanese pressings of the CD.

The Minneapolis-based band The Outliers released a version of the song on their 2008 album It Seemed Like a Good Idea at the Time.

It also made an appearance in the Nintendo DS rhythm games Osu! Tatakae! Ouendan as the song in the ramen shop owner stage, Metcha! Taiko no Tatsujin DS: Nanatsu no Shima no Daibouken, as well as the Wii rhythm game Taiko no Tatsujin Wii: Do Don to 2 Daime, and the PS4 rhythm game Taiko no Tatsujin: Drum Session

It was also released as the character song of Masaomi Kida from Durarara!! in the first DVD.

A cover of Linda Linda was featured in the anime series The Rolling Girls.

All-girl Asian-American and Latina punk rock band The Linda Lindas named their band after the song. They later performed a cover of "Linda Linda" on the bonus edition of their album, Growing Up.

The song is featured in the original 2021 Netflix film Mixtape.

== See also ==
- 1987 in Japanese music
