= Hiroto Kōmoto =

Japanese rock singer (born 1963)

Hiroto Kōmoto 甲本 ヒロト
- Born: 甲本浩人; March 17, 1963 (age 63); Okayama, Japan
- Origin: Tokyo, Japan
- Genre: Punk rock
- Occupations: Musician, songwriter, composer
- Years active: 1985–present
- Label: BMG Japan
- Website: Kōmoto Hiroto official site

Hiroto Kōmoto (甲本 ヒロト, Kōmoto Hiroto; born 17 March 1963) is a Japanese rock singer who has fronted bands such as The Blue Hearts, The High-Lows and The Cro-Magnons.

== Early life ==
Kōmoto was born in 1963 in Okayama, Okayama Prefecture and graduated from the junior high school attached to the School of Education at Okayama University before graduating from the prefectural Sōzan High School. He attended Hosei University after high school, but dropped out before completing his degree.

== Career ==
In 1985, Kōmoto joined with Masatoshi Mashima to form The Blue Hearts and released their first single (Hito ni Yasashiku) and their major debut (Linda Linda) in 1987. After The Blue Hearts took a break from studio work and touring in 1994, Kōmoto started working on a solo album which was never released.

In 1995, Kōmoto and Mashima joined to form Happy Song Co., Ltd. When the band officially broke up on June 1 of that year, they also formed a new band, The High-Lows. The new band released its first single (Missile Man) and a self-titled album on October 25. A couple of years later, Kōmoto and Mashima finished building their own studio, Atomic Boogie Studio. The High-Lows eventually broke up in 2005.

Kōmoto continued solo studio work in 2006 and released two singles on July 5, Manatsu no Sutoreeto and Tengoku Umare.He played all of the instruments for the song, including guitar, bass, and drums. He again joined with Mashima later in the year and performed at a rock festival on July 23, marking the official beginning of The Cro-Magnons. They released their debut single, Tallyho, on September 20.

In June 2026, Komoto recorded a duet version of Japanese-American singer-songwriter Hikaru Utada's single Pappaparadise along with an accompanying music video featuring both singers on a motorbike. They also recorded a 40-minute discussion together, focusing on their careers and the making of the single and video.

== Personal life ==
The official kanji for his name are 甲本 浩人, but katakana is used when writing his name in official publications.

He has a younger brother, Masahiro Kōmoto, an actor.
