= Masatoshi Mashima =

Japanese musician

Masatoshi Mashima 真島 昌利
- Born: February 20, 1962 (age 64); Hino, Tokyo, Japan
- Genre: Punk rock
- Occupations: Musician, songwriter
- Instruments: Guitar, vocals
- Years active: 1978–present
- Label: BMG Japan

Masatoshi Mashima (真島 昌利, Mashima Masatoshi; born February 20, 1962) is a Japanese guitarist who has performed with Japanese rock bands such as The Blue Hearts, The High-Lows and The Cro-Magnons. He was born in Hino and raised in Kodaira in Tokyo, Japan.

His nickname while playing was "Mashi."

== Solo albums ==
1. Natsu no Nukegara (夏のぬけがら) (November 21, 1989)
2. Happy Songs (April 10, 1991)
3. Raw Life (November 1, 1992)
4. Hito ni wa Sorezore Jijō ga Aru (人にはそれぞれ事情がある) (October 21, 1994)
5. Raw Life -Revisited- (April 25, 2007)
