= Rami (singer) =

Japanese singer and lyricist

- Also known as: Rami the Requiem
- Born: March 15; Osaka Prefecture, Japan
- Genres: Heavy metal, power metal
- Occupations: Singer, lyricist
- Instrument: Vocals
- Years active: 2008–2012, 2014–present
- Labels: Across Music, Metalose Enemy
- Formerly of: Aldious
- Website: Official website

Rami (Japanese: らみ, Hepburn: Rami; stylized as RAMI) is a Japanese heavy metal singer and lyricist. She first rose to prominence as vocalist and co-founder of the all-female power metal band Aldious from 2008 to 2012. After a hiatus, she resumed musical activities in 2015 as the vocalist of the group Raglaia, before starting a solo career in 2016.

== Career ==
Rami started singing at five years old. Her parents converted their garage into a kind of karaoke café, where she heard enka for the first time. She then started listening to J-pop and rock, before someone introduced her to heavy metal and she became immersed in it. Her first band was called Area. Rami co-founded Aldious in Osaka with guitarist Yoshi in June 2008. She is the one who came up with the band name by shortening the phrase "Ultimate Melodious," and wrote almost all the lyrics during her time with them. Aldious released their debut EP Dear Slave in November 2009, and their first album Deep Exceed in October 2010. The album topped Oricon's independent music chart while reaching number 15 on its main one. Their second, October 2011's Determination which reached number 13, would be Rami's last with them. On June 29, 2012, it was announced that she was leaving the band due to health concerns. Aldious are now cited as pioneers of the Girls Metal Band Boom that began in Japan in the 2010s.

Rami resumed musical activities in January 2015 as vocalist and lyricist of the heavy metal "project band" Raglaia (ラグライア, Raguraia). It was formed after Sads guitarist K-A-Z came across her demos in 2014. Its name comes from the Greek goddess Aglaia, with a letter "R" taken from Rami's name added to the beginning. The group also includes Aion support drummer Youth-K and KillsKills bassist and backing vocalist Ery. They released their debut single "Breaking Dawn" on April 8, and it reached the number 20 position on the Oricon. It was supported by a short tour that began with their first concert on June 12. A second single titled "Promises" followed on August 12, and peaked at number 38. Raglaia released their first album Creation on November 11, and it reached number 22. Recording of the singles and album began before Ery joined with Hitoki from Kuroyume providing bass on several songs. The album also features contributions by Kiyoharu, Outrage bassist Yoshihiro Yasui and former Bow Wow member Shotaro Mitsuzono.

In 2016, Rami began a solo career releasing the album Aspiration on September 7, which reached number 16. It features contributions from veteran metal musicians such as Syu, Yuhki and Fumiya of Galneryus, Katsuji and Kentaro of Gargoyle, and Saber Tiger bassist Hibiki. Her live band for its tour included Cyntia members Yui and Azu, and TSP drummer Hina. Rami's second album, Reloaded, was released on January 31, 2018, and peaked at number 31.

In March 2020, Rami released the digital download song "Requiem" under the name Rami the Requiem. She sang two songs on the April 2020 album Meta-Loid by Miyu, who has supported Rami in her solo career as live guitarist. The first official single by Rami the Requiem, "Serial Killer", was released on July 15, 2020. Rami the Requiem's first album, Gyōan Dōkoku, was released on June 23, 2021.

== Discography ==
=== Solo career ===
Year	Details	Oricon	Billboard Japan
2016	Aspiration: Studio album; Released: September 7, 2016; Label: Across Music	16	25
2017	Aspiration Tour ~Live at Duo Music Exchange~: Concert DVD; Released: April 12, 2017; Label: Across Music	34	N/A
2018	Reloaded: Studio album; Released: January 31, 2018; Label: Across Music	31	26
2018	Reloaded Tour Vol. 1 ~Live at Unit~: Concert DVD; Released: November 21, 2018; Label: Across Music	132	N/A
2020	"Requiem": Digital; Released: March 15, 2020; Label: Metalose Enemy	—	—
2020	"Serial Killer": Single; Released: July 15, 2020; Label: Metalose Enemy	—	—
2021	Gyōan Dōkoku (暁闇慟哭): Studio album; Released: June 23, 2021; Label: Metalose Enemy	—	—
2023	Dark Birth Era: Mini album; Released: June 11, 2023; Label: Metalose Enemy	—	—

=== With Aldious ===
Year	Details	Oricon
2009	Dear Slave: EP; Released: November 7, 2009; Label: Self-release	—
2010	"Defended Desire": Single; Released: July 7, 2010; Label: Bright Star Records	49
2010	Deep Exceed: Studio album; Released: October 13, 2010; Label: Bright Star Records	15
2011	"Mermaid": Single; Released: April 6, 2011; Label: Bright Star Records	20
2011	Determination: Studio album; Released: October 12, 2011; Label: Bright Star Records	13
2012	Determination Tour 2011 -Live at Shibuya O-East-: Concert DVD; Released: May 16, 2012; Label: Bright Star Records	6

=== With Raglaia ===
Year	Details	Oricon	Billboard Japan
2015	"Breaking Dawn": Single; Released: April 8, 2015; Label: Across Music	20	—
2015	"Promises": Single; Released: August 12, 2015; Label: Across Music	38	—
2015	Creation: Studio album; Released: November 11, 2015; Label: Across Music	22	23

=== Other work ===
- Manipulated Slaves; Back from the Damnation (2009) – backing vocals
- Miyu; Meta-Loid (2020) – vocals on "Miss&Loid" and "Alive"
- Fate Gear; The Sky Prison (2021) – vocals on "Dancing in the Moonlight"
