= Lullabies for the Dormant Mind =

Studio album by The Agonist
- Released: February 23, 2009
- Recorded: 2008
- Studios: Studio Garage, Montreal, Canada
- Genres: Melodic death metal; metalcore; deathcore
- Length: 43:37
- Label: Century Media
- Producers: The Agonist, Christian Donaldson

The Agonist chronology
Once Only Imagined (2007)	Lullabies for the Dormant Mind (2009)	Prisoners (2012)

Singles from Lullabies for the Dormant Mind
- 1. "And Their Eulogies Sang Me to Sleep" Released: March 15, 2009; 2. "Birds Elope With the Sun" Released: August 20, 2009; 3. "Thank You, Pain" Released: September 13, 2009

Professional ratings
Review scores
Source	Rating
About.com	3.5/5 stars
AllMusic	3.5/5 stars
Alter the Press	3/5 stars
The Heaviest Matter of the Universe	7/10 stars

Lullabies for the Dormant Mind is the second studio album by Canadian metal band The Agonist. It was produced by Christian R. Donaldson (Cryptopsy, Mythosis). The album demonstrates a more diverse sound than the Agonist's debut album and features classical, jazz, opera, grindcore, thrash metal, and black metal influences. It features guest violins by Avi Ludmer (Mahogany Rush) and orchestrations by classical pianists Melina Soochan and Jonathan Lefrancois-Leduc (Blackguard). In 2009 the band released two videos from the album, "...And Their Eulogies Sang Me to Sleep" and "Thank You, Pain".

== Style ==
Lullabies for the Dormant Mind contains a wide range of songs including ones described as gothic metal and power metal.

== Track listing ==
All tracks are written by The Agonist, except for Swan Lake by Pyotr Ilyich Tchaikovsky.

No.	Title	Length
1.	"The Tempest (The Siren's Song; The Banshee's Cry)"	4:46
2.	"...and Their Eulogies Sang Me to Sleep."	3:33
3.	"Thank You, Pain."	3:45
4.	"Birds Elope with the Sun"	4:30
5.	"Waiting Out the Winter"	4:03
6.	"Martyr Art"	4:31
7.	"Globus Hystericus"	3:41
8.	"Swan Lake (A Cappella)"	2:53
9.	"The Sentient"	3:40
10.	"When the Bough Breaks"	4:13
11.	"Chlorpromazine"	4:08
Total length:		43:37

Bonus Track
No.	Title	Length
12.	"Monochromatic Stains" (Dark Tranquility Cover, Japanese Bonus Track)	3:33
Total length:		47:10

== Personnel ==
The Agonist

- Alissa White-Gluz – lead vocals
- Danny Marino – guitars
- Chris Kells – bass, backing vocals
- Simon McKay – drums, percussions

Production

- Christian Donaldson – producer, mixing, mastering
- Youri Raymond (ex-Cryptopsy, Unhuman) – vocals on "...and Their Eulogies Sang Me to Sleep."
- Avi Ludmer (Mahogany Rush) – violin
- Melina Soochan – piano
- Natalie Shau – artwork
- Jonathan Lefrancois-Leduc (Blackguard) – piano

== Charts ==
Chart (2012)	Peak position
Japanese Albums Chart	174
