= Drug treatment =

Drug treatment may refer to:

- the treatment of illness with pharmaceutical drugs
- Drug rehabilitation, the treatment of substance dependence/drug addiction
- Drug Treatment, an album by the Japanese band Kuroyume
