= Beams (song) =

Single by Kuroyume

from the album Fake Star
- Language: Japanese
- B-side: "Baby Glamorous"
- Released: October 13, 1995
- Label: Toshiba EMI
- Songwriter: Kiyoharu

Kuroyume singles chronology
| "Miss Moonlight" (1995) | "Beams" (1995) | "See You" (1995) |

"Beams" is the fifth major single by Japanese band Kuroyume, released on October 13, 1995. The song was featured in a commercial for Maxell cassette tapes, with lead singer Kiyoharu starring in the ad. It was featured on the album Fake Star ~I'm Just a Japanese Fake Rocker~, with a different mix.

"Beams" features an aesthetic that stands in contrast to the visual kei bands of the time, with a more pop-inspired look rather than a dark one. It is considered the starting point of the band's major success, as it was the first to receive a certification from RIAJ.

== Commercial performance ==
"Beams" reached number six on the Oricon Singles Chart, where it remained for 14 weeks. It sold 348,540 copies while on chart, becoming the group's second-best-selling single, behind "Shōnen" (1998).

In November 1995, it was certified gold by RIAJ for selling more than 100,000 copies.

== Covers ==
In 2006, the band AcQuA-E.P. included a cover of "Beams" on their 2006 single "Re:dear". In 2009, Kiyoharu re-recorded the song for his solo album of Kuroyume covers, titled Self Cover Album "Medley". For the tribute album Fuck the Border Line, Yamaarashi and Moonmin recorded a cover of the song in 2011. That same year, the girl group Blistar recorded a cover for the EP BLiSTAR ROCKIN’ COVERS ~Rock&Sexy~.

== Track listing ==
All tracks are written by Kiyoharu, except track 2, music by Hitoki.

| No. | Title | Length |
|---|---|---|
| 1. | "Beams" | 4:56 |
| 2. | "Baby Glamorous" | 4:36 |
| 3. | "Beams Original Instrumental" | 4:52 |

== Personnel ==
- Kiyoharu – vocals
- Hitoki – bass
