= Japanese Menu/Distortion 10 =

- Limited edition cover

Studio album by Kiyoharu
- Released: March 25, 2020
- Genre: Rock
- Length: 44:19
- Language: Japanese
- Label: Pony Canyon

Kiyoharu chronology
Yoru, Carmen no Shishuu (2018)	Japanese Menu/Distortion 10 (2020)	Eternal (2024)

Japanese Menu/Distortion 10 is the tenth solo studio album by the Japanese musician Kiyoharu, released on March 25, 2020. The album was released in two editions: the regular edition on CD, with ten tracks, and the limited edition, with eleven tracks and three video clips on an additional DVD. The album covers were created by several artists from the Yamanami Kobo.

== Charts ==
The album peaked at the 27° position on the Oricon charts.

== Track listing ==
No.	Title	Length
1.	"Survive of Vision"	4:37
2.	"Geretsu" (下劣)	3:18
3.	"Outsider" (アウトサイダー)	3:15
4.	"Greige" (グレージュ)	3:51
5.	"Sakkaku Refrain" (錯覚リフレイン)	4:07
6.	"Ryoujoku" (凌辱)	4:00
7.	"Senrei" (洗礼)	3:46
8.	"Uso to Oroka" (嘘と愚か)	3:34
9.	"Yume Oi" (夢追い)	3:10
10.	"Romantic" (ロマンティック)	5:13
11.	"Boukyaku no Sora (25th Anniversary Ver.)" (忘却の空(25th Anniversary Ver.); Sads cover; limited edition only)	5:27
Total length:		44:19

Limited edition DVD
No.	Title	Length
1.	"Survive of Vision" (Music video)
2.	"Greige" (Music video)
3.	"A Day in New York & More landscape"
