= Sicksense =

American nu metal band

- Origin: Phoenix, Arizona
- Genres: Nu metalcore; Nu metal; metalcore
- Years active: 2021–present
- Label: Earache
- Members: Vicky Psarakis; Robby J. Fonts; Richard Regier; Sam Neumann; Jackson Snowden
- Past members: Phillip Lykostratis; Joseph Polizzi
- Website: sicksense.com

Sicksense is an American nu metalcore band from Phoenix, Arizona, formed in 2021. The band is fronted by Vicky Psarakis, formerly of The Agonist, and her husband Robby J. Fonts of Stuck Mojo. The line-up is completed by guitarist Jackson Snowden, bassist Richard Regier and Sam Neumann on drums.

== History ==
Sicksense released the EP Kings Today in 2022, and Fools Tomorrow in 2023. They announced their signing to Earache Records in July 2024, at which time Lykostratis and Regier also joined the band.

At the start of 2025, Sicksense opened up for the reunited Snot at their first two comeback shows in California with new singer, Andy Knapp. Sicksense's debut album Cross Me Twice was released on March 28, 2025, featuring singles including "Wildfires", "Masquerade Parade" and "In This Carousel". The album was produced by Joey Doherty and recorded primarily in the band's home studio in Phoenix. Upon release, it landed at Number Ten in the UK's Official Rock and Metal Albums Chart and Number 72 in the Official Albums Chart.

In July 2025, they went on a tour in support of Spineshank and The Union Underground. In September 2025, the band went on tour in support of Calva Louise. During their tour supporting Calva Louise, the band played The Big Bourbon Stage at Louder Than Life in Louisville, KY in 2025. Their singer, Vicky Psarakis is featured in the Call of Duty video game franchise, with her vocals appearing on the songs "Slave" from Call of Duty: Black Ops 6 and "No One There" from Call of Duty: Black Ops 7. In the spring of 2026, the band announced they parted ways with Earache Records, as well as a new lineup, with the additions of Jackson Snowden on guitar and Sam Neumann on drums. The band released their EP, Funerals on September 25, 2026.

== Band members ==
Current

- Vicky Psarakis – vocals (2021–present)
- Robby J. Fonts – vocals (2021–present)
- Richard Regier – bass (2024–present)
- Sam Neumann – drums (2026–present; live 2025)
- Jackson Snowden – guitar (2026–present)

Former

- Phillip Lykostratis – guitar (2024–2026)
- Joseph Polizzi – drums (2024–2026)

== Discography ==
=== Studio albums ===
- Cross Me Twice (2025)

=== EPs ===
- Kings Today (2022)
- Fools Tomorrow (2023)
- Funerals (2026)

== Filmography ==
Caption text
Year	Title	Role
2024	Call of Duty: Black Ops 6	Slave (song), Citadelle des Morts DLC
2026	Call of Duty: Black Ops 7	No One There (song), Totenreich DLC
