= Mayoeru Yuritachi -Romance of Scarlet- =

Studio album by Kuroyume
- Released: March 9, 1994
- Genre: Alternative rock, gothic rock, post punk
- Length: 48:11
- Language: Japanese
- Label: EMI

Kuroyume chronology
Nakigara o... (1993)	Mayoeru Yuritachi -Romance of Scarlet- (1994)	Cruel (1994)

Singles from Mayoeru Yuritachi -Romance of Scarlet-
- 1. "For Dear" Released: February 9, 1994

Mayoeru Yuritachi ~Romance of Scarlet~ (迷える百合達 〜Romance of Scarlet〜) is the second studio album by Japanese band Kuroyume, released on March 9, 1994 by EMI. It is their first album on a major label and the first with producer Masahide Sakuma.

On February 9, 1994, the album's only single, "For Dear", was released, marking the band's first release on a major label. It was theme song for the TV Asahi soccer program J League A GOGO!!. Kiyoharu told Natalie that fans from their indie era began to repudiate the band: "About a quarter of the audience walked off the moment [...] ‘for dear’ started playing." In addition, this was the first of the band’s many songs to be featured in a television show or commercial.

The album was re-released on May 27, 1998. In 2011, EMI launched the project EMI ROCKS The First and reissued its best albums, selected by music critic Manabu Yuasa. On December 14, the project reissued Mayoeru Yuritachi ~Romance of Scarlet~.

== Musical style and themes ==
Guitarist Shin was the album's primary songwriter. He retained the gothic and melancholic sound the band had cultivated up to that point, but began their transition into the pop era, with the heavy, aggressive compositions of previous albums taking a back seat. Music magazine CD Journal commented that "while retaining the dark image they had until then, you can feel the catchy approach associated with the transfer to a major label"; in other words, the change was due to their signing with EMI.

The track "Autism" had to be removed from the album in its subsequent reissues due to criticism of how the subject was handled. As a result, it was performed live on only a handful of occasions, one of which was at an all-male concert in 2014.

== Commercial performance and legacy ==
Mayoeru Yuritachi ~Romance of Scarlet~ marked the beginning of Kuroyume's mainstream recognition, reaching number three on the Oricon Albums Chart and remaining on the chart for eight weeks. It sold 90,450 copies while on the chart. "For Dear" peaked at number 18, remained on the chart for six weeks, and sold 68,490 copies while on chart.

Tetsu from Merry said that Mayoeru Yuritachi ~Romance of Scarlet~ is a special album among the works of Kuroyume, one of the bands that influenced him.

== Track listing ==
All lyrics are written by Kiyoharu.

No.	Title	Music	Length
1.	"Kaika no Hibiki" (開化の響)		1:41
2.	"Toge" (棘)	Hitoki	3:29
3.	"For Dear"	Shin	4:46
4.	"Masochist organ"	Shin	3:26
5.	"aimed blade at you"	Hitoki	4:48
6.	"Yuri no Hanataba" (百合の花束)	Shin	6:55
7.	"Kamoku o Kureta Kimi to Kunō ni Michita Boku" (寡黙をくれた君と苦悩に満ちた僕)	Shin	5:04
8.	"Neo nude"	Shin	3:50
9.	"Autism -Jiheisou-" (autism -自閉症-)	Hitoki	3:50
10.	"Romancia"	Shin	4:21
11.	"Utopia"	Shin	4:43
12.	"Kaika no Hibiki [reprise]" (開化の響 [reprise])		1:28
Total length:			48:11

== Personnel ==
- Kiyoharu (清春) – vocals
- Hitoki (人時) – bass
- Shin (臣) – guitar
- Masahide Sakuma – producer
