= Fake Star ~I'm Just a Japanese Fake Rocker~ =

Studio album by Kuroyume
- Released: May 29, 1996
- Genre: Rock
- Length: 56:00
- Language: Japanese
- Label: EMI

Kuroyume chronology
Feminism (1995)	Fake Star ~I'm Just a Japanese Fake Rocker~ (1996)	Drug Treatment (1997)

Singles from Fake Star
- 1. "Beams" Released: October 13, 1995; 2. "See You" Released: February 21, 1996; 3. "Pistol" Released: April 17, 1996

Fake Star ~I'm Just a Japanese Fake Rocker~ (stylized in all caps; commonly abbreviated to Fake Star) is the fourth studio album by the Japanese rock band Kuroyume, released on May 29, 1996, by EMI. The song "Pistol" won an International Viewer's Choice Award at the 1996 MTV Video Music Awards. Fake Star peaked at the number one on the Oricon Albums Chart and sold 203,660 copies in its first week.

== Track listing ==
All lyrics are written by Kiyoharu.

No.	Title	Length
1.	"Noise Low^{3}"	0:49
2.	"Fake Star"	2:40
3.	"Beams" (Fake Star Version)	4:54
4.	"Barter"	4:13
5.	"I "Sunny's Voice""	0:25
6.	"See You" (Fake Star Version)	4:57
7.	"Reason of Myself"	5:22
8.	"II"	0:13
9.	"Sex Symbol"	3:27
10.	"Cool Girl"	4:38
11.	"S.O.S"	3:20
12.	"III"	0:12
13.	"Hysteria's"	5:12
14.	"Pistol" (ピストル; Fake Star Version)	4:44
15.	"Yume" (夢)	4:44
16.	"「H･L･M」is Original"	3:37
17.	"IV "Either Side""	1:26
Total length:		56:00

== Personnel ==
- Kiyoharu (清春) – vocals
- Hitoki (人時) – bass
