= Orphans (The Agonist album) =

Studio album by The Agonist
- Released: September 20, 2019
- Recorded: 2018
- Studios: The Grid Studio, Montreal, Quebec, Canada
- Genres: Melodic death metal; metalcore
- Length: 43:00
- Label: Napalm
- Producer: Christian Donaldson

The Agonist chronology
Five (2016)	Orphans (2019)

Singles from Orphans
- 1. "In Vertigo" Released: June 9, 2019; 2. "Burn It All Down" Released: July 26, 2019; 3. "As One We Survive" Released: September 7, 2019; 4. "Orphans" Released: June 16, 2020

Orphans is the sixth and final studio album by Canadian metal band The Agonist, released on September 20, 2019 through Napalm Records. The album has received positive feedback. Music videos were released for some songs including "In Vertigo" and the title track. The latter marks the first and only album by the band to have a title track, as vocalist Vicky Psarakis "felt it really represented the album."

== Track listing ==
All tracks are written by The Agonist.

No.	Title	Length
1.	"In Vertigo"	5:04
2.	"As One We Survive"	3:40
3.	"The Gift of Silence"	4:35
4.	"Blood as My Guide"	4:27
5.	"Mr. Cold"	4:44
6.	"Dust to Dust"	3:22
7.	"A Devil Made Me Do It"	3:38
8.	"The Killing I"	4:17
9.	"Orphans"	5:40
10.	"Burn It All Down"	3:33

== Personnel ==
The Agonist

- Vicky Psarakis – lead vocals
- Danny Marino – guitar
- Pascal "Paco" Jobin – guitar
- Chris Kells – bass
- Simon McKay – drums

Additional

- Christian Donaldson – production, mixing, mastering
- Lefteris Germenlis – electronic and string arrangements
- Silent Q Design – artwork
