= Yoru, Carmen no Shishuu =

Studio album by Kiyoharu
- Released: February 28, 2018
- Genre: Rock
- Length: 66:49
- Label: TRIAD

Kiyoharu chronology
Soloist (2016)	Yoru, Carmen no Shishuu (2018)	Japanese Menu/Distortion 10 (2020)

Yoru, Carmen no Shishuu (夜、カルメンの詩集) is the ninth studio album by the Japanese rock singer Kiyoharu, released on February 28, 2018. It was released in two editions: regular, with ten tracks, and limited, with eleven tracks, a DVD with three video clips and a bonus CD in which the tracks are read in the form of poetry.

== Charts ==
The album peaked at the nineteenth position on the Oricon charts.

== Production ==
The cover was created by the artist Kosuke Kawamura.

== Track listing ==
No.	Title	Length
1.	"Hika" (悲歌)	5:04
2.	"Aika no Towa" (赤の永遠)	5:06
3.	"Yoru wo Omou" (夜を、想う)	4:28
4.	"Amore" (アモーレ)	5:05
5.	"Charade" (シャレード)	5:20
6.	"Nemureru Tenshi" (眠れる天使)	4:09
7.	"Twilight"	3:46
8.	"Mikazuki" (三日月)	4:41
9.	"Bigaku" (美学)	5:29
10.	"Anata ni Natte" (貴方になって)	7:19
Total length:		66:49

Limited edition bonus tracks
No.	Title	Length
11.	"Tsumihorobashi Nobara" (罪滅ぼし野ばら)	2:55

Limited edition bonus tracks (DVD)
No.	Title	Length
1.	"Aika no Towa" (Music video)
2.	"Nemureru Tenshi" (Music video)
3.	"Yoru wo Omou" (Music video)

== Additional musicians ==
- Duran and Koichi Korenaga - guitar
- Chiei Kobayashi - flamenco guitar
- Yuuji Okiyama - bass
- Yosuke (容昌) - percussion
- Katsuma - drums
