= Suitei Shoujo =

Japanese pop duo

Suitei Shoujo (推定少女, Suitei Shōjo) was a Japanese pop duo that debuted in August 2001, consisting of members Rino (Nikaido Rino 二階堂梨乃, born April 9, 1987) and Lissa (Abe Risa 安倍莉沙, born September 8, 1987). They were known as the Japanese t.A.T.u due to their provocative outfits and attitude towards each other. They disbanded on March 31, 2006. Lissa stopped all of her activities in the entertainment business that year, while Rino would continue on as an indie artist and model and would later be known as Re:NO. In 2012, Rino joined the Japanese all-female metal band Aldious.

== Discography ==
=== Singles ===
- Shouchi no suke (しょうちのすけ) (2001.8.22)
- Sekigae (席替え) (2002.7.24)
- Seibo shugi (聖母主義) (2002.12.4)
- Kagi ga akanai (鍵が開かない) (2003.1.22) (ending theme of the film Ju-on: The Grudge)
- Jouhou (情報) (2003.5.21) (opening theme of the anime E's Otherwise)
- Shitsuren song (失恋ソング/間違い) (2003.8.27)
- Shindou (振動) (DVD) (2004.11.17)
- Chocolate (チョコレート) (DVD single) (2004.12.22)
- Chewing Girl (チューイングガール) (DVD single) (2005.1.19)

=== Albums ===
- 16 - Sixteen (2003/10/1)
- 17's Heaven (2005/4/20)

=== DVD ===
- 17's Heaven (2005/4/20) (clips)

=== Photobooks ===
- Reamono (2004)
