= Prisoners (album) =

Studio album by the Agonist
- Released: June 4, 2012
- Genres: Melodic death metal; metalcore; deathcore; progressive metal
- Length: 58:37
- Label: Century Media Records
- Producers: The Agonist; Christian Donaldson

The Agonist chronology
Lullabies for the Dormant Mind (2009)	Prisoners (2012)	Eye of Providence (2015)

Singles from Prisoners
- 1. "Ideomotor" Released: May 8, 2012; 2. "Panophobia" Released: October 24, 2012

Prisoners is the third studio album by Canadian metal band the Agonist. It was released on June 4 in Europe and June 5, 2012, in North America via Century Media records and was produced by the band's longtime producer Christian Donaldson. "Ideomotor" has been confirmed as the first single. The album sold 1,400 copies in the United States in the first week of its release and debuted at No. 19 on the Top New Artist Albums (Heatseekers) chart. This is the last album with original singer Alissa White-Gluz before she joined Arch Enemy in 2014.

Professional ratings
Review scores
Source	Rating
About.com	3.5/5 stars
AllMusic	4/5 stars
Heavy Blog Is Heavy	4.5/5 stars
Sputnikmusic	4/5 stars

== Style ==
About.com's Dan Marsicano described the album as a "focused blend of strait-laced metalcore and technical craftsmanship that borders on the progressive front", and Sputnikmusic wrote that the album is "oozing with inspiration from a plethora of genres, such as melodeath, thrash and progressive metal."

== Critical reception ==
In a review for AllMusic, critic reviewer Eduardo Rivadavia explained: "Although its explosively schizophrenic amalgam of disparate sounds, moods, and intensities might initially suggest otherwise, the Agonist's third album, Prisoners, is in fact an apt summation of that which came before it; a mature, calculated freakout representing the latest sprint in the Canadian band's aggressive evolutionary curve, well beyond the modest metalcore roots. At About.com, Dan Marsicano wrote: "Prisoners is a much tamer album than Lullabies for the Dormant Mind, with less additional instrumentation, but is just a smidgen better due to the combined effort of each member."

== Track listing ==
No.	Title	Length
1.	"You're Coming with Me"	5:35
2.	"The Escape"	4:08
3.	"Predator & Prayer"	5:04
4.	"Anxious Darwinians"	5:23
5.	"Panophobia"	3:54
6.	"Ideomotor"	8:07
7.	"Lonely Solipsist"	3:45
8.	"Dead Ocean"	6:19
9.	"The Mass of the Earth"	4:40
10.	"Everybody Wants You (Dead)"	5:00
11.	"Revenge of the Dadaists"	6:42
Total length:		58:37

Japanese edition
No.	Title	Length
12.	"Jesters Rejoice Where Wise Men Weep"	4:37
Total length:		63:04

== Personnel ==
=== The Agonist ===
- Alissa White-Gluz – lead vocals, lyrics
- Danny Marino – lead guitar, acoustic guitar in "Dead Ocean"
- Pascal "Paco" Jobin – rhythm guitar, acoustic guitar in "Dead Ocean"
- Chris Kells – bass, backing vocals
- Simon McKay – drums, percussion

=== Production ===
- Christian Donaldson – producer
- Tue Madsen – mixing

== Charts ==
Chart (2012)	Peak position
Heatseekers Albums	19
Japanese Albums Chart	89
