= Aldious =

Japanese heavy metal band

- Origin: Osaka, Japan
- Genres: Heavy metal; power metal
- Years active: 2008–2025
- Labels: Bright Star / Spinning; Radiant A / VAA; JPU
- Members: Yoshi; Sawa
- Past members: Ruki; Kaze; Rami; Aruto; Re:NO; R!N; Marina; Toki
- Website: aldious.net

Aldious (Japanese: アルディアス, Hepburn: Arudiasu) was a Japanese heavy metal band formed in Osaka in 2008 by guitarist Yoshi and vocalist Rami. After member changes, they released their debut EP, Dear Slave, the following year, and, soon after, formed their own record label, Bright Star Records. A stabilized line-up including guitarist Toki, bassist Sawa and drummer Aruto was established by 2010. Their first album, Deep Exceed (2010), reached the top 15 on the Oricon chart, as did their second, Determination (2011). Rami left the group in June 2012. New vocalist Re:NO joined Aldious one month later. They produced their third album, District Zero, in 2013, and it became their highest-charting release to date, reaching number 7.

Their fourth album, Dazed and Delight (2014), peaked at number 20, before Aruto left the band in September and was replaced with Marina in April 2015. Their fifth album, Radiant A, was released in December 2015, and was their first album on the VAA record label and their first released in Europe via JPU Records. Following another album, Unlimited Diffusion (2017), Re:NO left the band at the end of 2018 and was replaced with R!N in August 2019, until she, too, left in June 2021. After performing with a support vocalist for three years and Marina's departure, Aldious began an indefinite hiatus in August 2025. Aldious have been labelled pioneers of the 2010s Japanese Girls Metal Band Boom.

== History ==
=== Formation, debut and Rami's withdrawal (2008–2013) ===
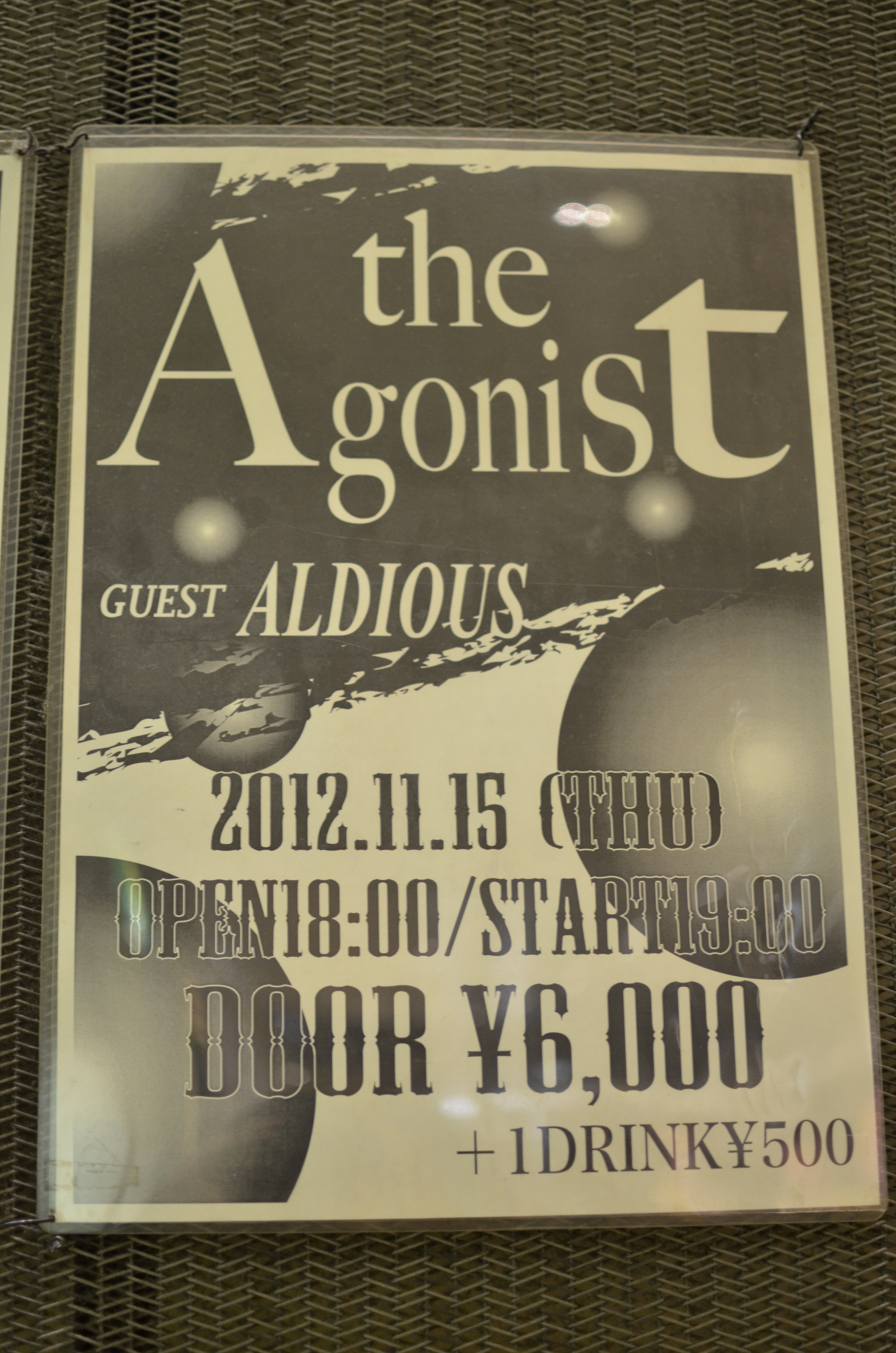
Poster for a November 2012 concert by The Agonist and Aldious in Osaka

Aldious was formed in Osaka in June 2008 when guitarist and leader Yoshi teamed up with vocalist Rami. The name Aldious was created by Rami shortening the phrase "Ultimate Melodious." The singer said that they intentionally express their femininity by wearing dresses with big hair, a style that saw the band labelled "Age-jō". In November they took part in the compilation album Red Hot Burning Hell Vol.16, soon after which guitarist Ruki and bassist Sawa left. In January 2009, Toki and Kaze joined as guitarist and bassist respectively, later the band self-released and sold-out their debut four-track EP Dear Slave on November 7. Kaze left in December, and drummer Aruto joined in January 2010. March saw the return of Sawa on bass and, around this time, Aldious formed their own record label, Bright Star Records. Their first single "Defended Desire", released on July 7, sold-out all 7,000 copies, reached the number 4 position on Oricon's Indies singles chart and number 49 on its regular chart. In April, Bright Star became a sublabel of Spinning and the band released their debut album Deep Exceed on October 13, 2010. It reached number 15 on the Oricon Albums Chart and sold over 30,000 copies.

Determination, the band's second album, was released on October 12, 2011, and reached number 13. The song "Spirit Black" was used as the ending theme song of the Fuji TV show Shimura Ken. The album's single, "Mermaid", was previously released on April 6 and earned the number 20 position. On June 29, 2012, it was announced that vocalist and co-founder Rami was leaving Aldious due to health concerns. She had informed the other members of her condition the previous year, but finally offered to leave as she felt she was hindering the band's activities. A month later, Re:NO (formerly of the pop duo Suitei Shoujo) was announced as Aldious's new singer on August 3. This line-up's first release was the single "White Crow" on November 14, which reached number 19 and was co-produced by Akihito Kinoshita, guitarist and leader of the veteran heavy metal band Saber Tiger. Re:No's first tour with Aldious was supporting Canadian metal band The Agonist at three Japanese shows in November 2012.

On May 15, 2013, Aldious released their third album District Zero, which became their first release to break the top ten. Its song "Scrash" became the ending theme song for the TBS TV show Ranking Kingdom from June to July. It was reported that for the album the band intentionally toned down their appearance and aimed for a "pure metal sound", so as to be recognized for their musicianship rather than being an all-female band.

=== Member changes (2013–2020) ===
Their fourth single and first double A-side, "Dominator / I Don't Like Me", was released on October 9, 2013, and is the group's highest charting, having reached number 12. Their next single, "Other World", peaked at number 22 and their fourth album, Dazed and Delight, released on June 18, 2014, was their lowest charting CD, only reaching the 20 position. In September 2014, Aruto announced she was leaving Aldious and music entirely due to her upcoming marriage. She stayed with the group until the end of November 2014. Aldious announced their new drummer Marina, step-daughter of American drummer Terry Bozzio, on April 19, 2015. They also left their parent record label Spinning at their own request.

Aldious released the triple A-side single "Die for You / Dearly / Believe Myself" on July 8, 2015. The band released their fifth album Radiant A on December 2. It was their first release on the VAA (Village Again Association) label, under their own sublabel that shares the Radiant A name, and their first featuring new drummer Marina, with a limited "Marina Edition" of the album available exclusively through HMV and Loppi. A second triple single, "Female Warrior / Nostalgic / Fragile", was released on October 26, 2016. Throughout the year, the band played at several major festivals and concerts such as Summer Sonic, Loud Park, Visual Japan Summit, and hide Birthday Party. Radiant A became Aldious's first album released overseas when it was published in Europe by JPU Records on March 17, 2017, with two additional live tracks.

The group released their sixth album, Unlimited Diffusion, on May 10, 2017. The album marked the first time each of the five members contributed songs and, like their previous album, it was produced by Shinichi Kobayashi of Zigoku Quartet. Their first mini-album, We Are, followed on November 29, 2017. It begins with fans chanting "We are Aldious!" during a concert in Kōchi Prefecture which was recorded by Re:NO on an iPhone. A second mini-album, All Brose, was released on November 21, 2018. Its title is a reference to blue roses, which do not exist in nature. On November 28, Re:NO announced that she would be ending musical activities after consulting a doctor about her patulous Eustachian tube. She left Aldious after their December 17 concert at Tsutaya O-East.

On April 20, 2019, Aldious began the national 45-date Evoke Tour with alternating guest vocalists R!N (SawanoHiroyuki [nZk]) and Saki (Cyntia). Toki began temporary maternity leave from the group after their June 9 show due to her pregnancy. The remaining dates of the tour were performed with guest guitarist Narumi (Destrose). The half-Filipino and English-fluent R!N officially joined the band as full-time vocalist on August 6. Aldious, with Narumi, performed their first international concert in Anaheim, California, at the NAMM Show on January 17, 2020. Toki returned to live activities with a performance on March 1. On March 18, the band released a self-cover album titled Evoke 2010–2020, which also includes a new song written by R!N. Their 2020 Japanese tour Unlash was scheduled to run from April 25 to November 23, with their first shows in Europe scheduled to occur September 30 to October 2. However, both tours were postponed due to the COVID-19 pandemic, with the European dates initially rescheduled to October 2021 before being cancelled in August 2021. Aldious held a concert with no live audience at Shibuya Club Quattro on August 14, 2020, to celebrate the tenth anniversary of their debut, and released a second self-cover album, Evoke II 2010–2020, on September 30.

=== Support vocalist and hiatus (2021–2025) ===
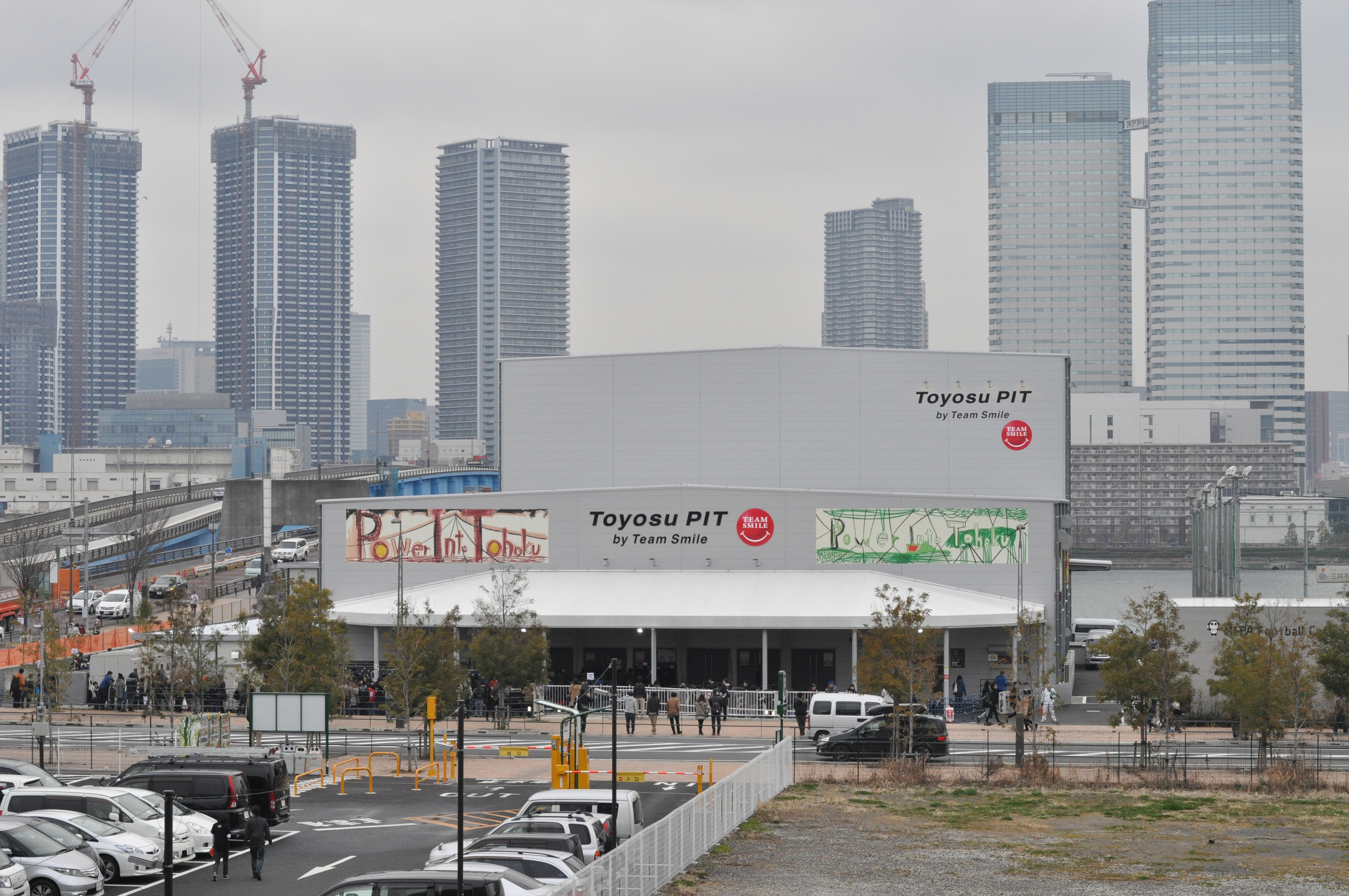
Aldious played the last concert before their hiatus at Toyosu Pit on August 13, 2025.

On June 18, 2021, Aldious announced that R!N had left the band after being hospitalized for depression and stress. The singer was first diagnosed in January and lost around 10 kilograms (22 pounds) as symptoms worsened. She offered to leave the band and the other members accepted her resignation. Maki Oyama performed with Aldious as guest vocalist for their rescheduled Unlash tour that started in July and ended in December, with the exception of the September 4 date, which was performed by just the four instrumentalists. Oyama continued to perform with Aldious, including on the five-date tour commemorating their 15th anniversary, which began in July 2023. They also held a special anniversary event at Club Citta on October 28, where the opening act included their former drummer Aruto. On December 20, Marina announced that she would be leaving the band due to health issues. She explained that her ulcerative colitis, which she was diagnosed with before joining Aldious, had been worsening and that she feels she is at her physical limit. Her final performances with the band were a trilogy of concerts titled Eternal Gratitude, which concluded on February 19, 2024. Aldious reunited with former members Aruto and Re:NO for one-night only at Club Citta on November 29, as part of the Queen of the Night two-man live with their former labelmates Cyntia.

On May 17, 2025, Aldious announced that they would be entering an indefinite hiatus following three concerts titled The Dominators Last Standing 2025. Yoshi, Toki and Sawa once again performed with Aruto and Re:NO in Nagoya at Electric Lady Land on August 1, in Osaka at Umeda Club Quattro on August 8, and finally in Tokyo at Toyosu Pit on August 13. The Toyosu Pit concert was recorded and received a limited-release as a live album and concert film by Nippon Columbia on December 24. Yoshi estimated that Aldious released around 90 songs and performed over 400 shows in their 17-year career.

At the end of July 2025, Sawa was announced as the bassist of the rock band First Contact, led by Blood Stain Child guitarist Ryu. On September 14, 2025, Toki announced her departure from Aldious. Zilqy, her new band with former Lovebites bassist Miho, was unveiled two days later.

== Band members ==
Current members

- Yoshi – guitar (2008–2025)
- Sawa (サワ) – bass (2008, 2010–2025)

Live support musicians

- Nana-A – drums (2014–2015)
- Saki – vocals (2019)
- Narumi – guitar (2019–2020)
- Maki Oyama – vocals (2021–2024)

Former members

- Hime Ruki (髏姫-Ruki-) – guitar (2008)
- Kaze (風-Kaze-) – bass (2009)
- Rami – vocals (2008–2012)
- Aruto – drums (2010–2014, 2024, 2025)
- Re:NO – vocals (2012–2018, 2024, 2025)
- R!N – vocals (2019–2021)
- Marina – drums (2015–2024)
- Toki (トキ) – guitar (2009–2025)

Timeline

== Discography ==
Aldious discography
- Studio albums: 6
- Live albums: 1
- Singles: 7
- Video albums: 11
- Mini-albums: 3
- Self-cover albums: 2

=== Studio albums ===
Title	Album details	Peak chart positions		
Title	Album details	JPN Oricon	JPN Billboard Hot	JPN Billboard Top
Deep Exceed	Released: October 13, 2010; Label: Bright Star / Spinning	15	—	26
Determination	Released: October 12, 2011; Label: Bright Star / Spinning	13	—	18
District Zero	Released: May 15, 2013; Label: Bright Star / Spinning	7	—	7
Dazed and Delight	Released: June 18, 2014; Label: Bright Star / Spinning	20	—	19
Radiant A	Released: December 2, 2015; Label: Radiant A / VAA, JPU	16	19	18
Unlimited Diffusion	Released: May 10, 2017; Label: Radiant A / VAA, JPU	13	18	13
"—" denotes a recording released before the creation of the Billboard Hot Albums chart.

=== Mini-albums ===
Title	Mini-album details	Peak chart positions		
Title	Mini-album details	JPN Oricon	JPN Billboard Hot	JPN Billboard Top
Dear Slave	Released: November 7, 2009; Label: Self-release	—	—	—
We Are	Released: November 29, 2017; Label: Radiant A / VAA, JPU	11	15	10
All Brose	Released: November 21, 2018; Label: Radiant A / VAA, JPU	17	22	15
"—" denotes a recording released before the creation of the Billboard Hot Albums chart, or that did not chart.

=== Self-cover albums ===
Title	Album details	Peak chart positions		
Title	Album details	JPN Oricon	JPN Billboard Hot	JPN Billboard Top
Evoke 2010–2020	Released: March 18, 2020; Label: Radiant A / VAA, JPU	24	23	23
Evoke II 2010–2020	Released: September 30, 2020; Label: Radiant A / VAA, JPU	25	28	23
"—" denotes a recording that did not chart.

=== Live albums ===
Title	Album details	Peak chart positions		
Title	Album details	JPN Oricon	JPN Billboard Hot	JPN Billboard Top
Aldious -The Dominators Last Standing 2025-	Released: December 24, 2025; Label: Nippon Columbia	—	—	—
"—" denotes a recording that did not chart.

=== Singles ===
Title	Year	Peak chart positions		
Title	Year	JPN Oricon	JPN Billboard	JPN Top Singles
"Defended Desire"	2010	49	—	80
"Mermaid"	2011	20	—	17
"White Crow"	2012	19	—	18
"Dominator / I Don't Like Me"	2013	12	—	11
"Other World"	2014	22	—	18
"Die for You / Dearly / Believe Myself"	2015	14	20	10
"Female Warrior / Nostalgic (ノスタルジック) / Fragile"	2016	42	—	39
"—" denotes a recording that did not chart.

=== Digital singles ===
Title	Year
"Show Down"	2021
"Freedom"	2021

=== Compilation appearances ===
Year	Song	Album
2008	"Ultimate Melodious"	Red Hot Burning Hell Vol. 16: Released: November 15, 2008
2008	"Shion" (紫苑)	Red Hot Burning Hell Vol. 16: Released: November 15, 2008

=== Video albums ===
Title	Video details	Peak chart positions
Title	Video details	JPN Oricon
Determination Tour 2011 -Live at Shibuya O-East-	Released: May 16, 2012	6
District Zero Tour ~Live at Shibuya O-East~	Released: February 12, 2014	6
Live Tour 2014 "Dazed and Delight" ~Live at Club Citta'~	Released: February 11, 2015	8
Radiant A Live at O-East	Released: October 12, 2016	7
Live Unlimited Diffusion	Released: October 11, 2017	8
Aldious Tour 2018 "We Are" Live at Liquid Room	Released: November 7, 2018	8
Music Video Collection	Released: December 19, 2018	32
Aldious Tour 2018 "We Are" ~Final~ Live at Tsutaya O-East	Released: April 24, 2019	—
Aldious Debut 10th Anniversary No Audience Live 2020	Released: October 21, 2020	—
Aldious Tour 2020–2021 "Unlash" Live at Liquid Room	Released: January 14, 2022	—
Aldious -The Dominators Last Standing 2025-	Released: December 24, 2025	—
"—" denotes a recording that did not chart.
