= Acoustic Nights Montreal =

Poster for Acoustic Nights I, Feb. 28, 2010

Acoustic Nights Montreal is a series of bi-monthly music shows, staged in various venues in Montreal, aiming to promote local Montreal musicians, with emphasis on singer-songwriters.

The concept of Acoustic Nights was first created by Melina Soochan. The first three such events were organized in association with Artists Alliance Productions and Global NTT. Subsequent events have been organized and produced solely by Soochan. These events have had fairly good coverage in the local English media, including radio interviews on K103 and CJAD, podcasts on Midnight Poutine, and articles in newspapers like The Suburban.

Each acoustic night event usually features 5-6 acts, either solo artists or small groups, who perform mostly original material, in an acoustic setting, i.e. no drums, no tracks, no distorted guitar. Some percussion is allowed.

A special event in the series was the Acoustic Nights Montreal Teen Songwriting Competition 2011, which aims to become an annual event, to discover and promote young talent. The winners are offered opportunities to perform with a professional band, among other interesting prizes (recording session, professional video, professional website and EPK, etc.).

The promotional posters and flyers for these events have been designed with an eye for instant recognition of both the event and the artists who participate.

== Chronology ==
The concept premiered on February 28, 2010 at Bourbon Street West, featuring Montreal artists Sabrina Correa, Patrick Lehman, Melina Soochan, SuLE and David Hodges.

Subsequent events in the Acoustic Nights series have been:

- 2010-04-13 Acoustic Nights 2 at Brutopia Brewpub (Jah Faith, Nil, Melina Soochan, Nikita U, Kweku Sam Kwofie and Pamela Brottes)
- 2010-06-24 Acoustic Nights 3 at Jupiter Room (Kristen Bussandri, Annie Becker, Melina Soochan, Michael Dozier and Athena Holmes)
- 2010-08-17 Acoustic Nights 4 at Jello Martini Lounge (Pat Robitaille, Vanwho, Melina Soochan with SuLE, Jenne Carey and Phil J and the Rekord Breakers)
- 2010-10-07 Acoustic Nights 5 at Les 3 Minots (Lady Katalyst, Katie Sevigny, Melina Soochan and Michael Johancsik, Dan and Laura, Bad Weather a.k.a. Rough Draft)
- 2010-12-14 Acoustic Nights 6 at Le Confessional (Stephanie Caprara, Sapo, Melina Soochan, Robert Augello, The Damn Truth)
- 2011-02-26 Acoustic Nights 7 at O Patro Vys (Melina Soochan, Michael Johancsik, JWaTtS, Matt Stern, Bohemian Soul Revival, Carrie Campbell, Matt Lipscombe, Sheila Giffen)
- 2011-04-23 Acoustic Nights 8 at O Patro Vys (Melina Soochan, Michael Johancsik, JWaTtS, Jon Davis, Neil Sullivan, Les Mélacoustiques)
- 2011-06-25 Acoustic Nights Montreal Teen Songwriting Competition 2011 at CETM (winners: Isabelle Stern, Matthew Azrieli, Hailey Samm)
- 2011-07-23 Acoustic Nights Summer Gala 2011 at La Sala Rossa (Melina Soochan and band, SuperNova & The Big Red Giants, Hailey Samm)
- 2011-11-18 Acoustic Nights 10 at Jello Martini Lounge (Melina Soochan and band, Isabelle Stern, Jolies Alien Babes, Hailey Samm, Ainsley McNeaney)
- 2012-06-23 Acoustic Nights Montreal Teen Songwriting Competition 2012 at Montreal Arts Council (winners: Laurie Martin, Kassandra Chamberland, Jimmy Khayata)
- 2012-09-30 Acoustic Nights Gala 2012 at La Sala Rossa (Melina Soochan and band, Laurie Martin, Kassandra Chamberland, Jimmy Khayata, Which is Which)
