= Once Only Imagined =

Studio album by The Agonist
- Released: August 14, 2007
- Recorded: 2005–2006
- Genre: Metalcore; melodic death metal
- Length: 38:17; 42:58 (Japanese Edition)
- Label: Century Media
- Producer: The Agonist; Christian Donaldson

The Agonist chronology
Once Only Imagined (2007)	Lullabies for the Dormant Mind (2009)

Singles from Once Only Imagined
- 1. "Business Suits and Combat Boots" Released: September 21, 2007

Professional ratings
Review scores
Source	Rating
AllMusic	2.5/5 stars
Time for Metal	9/10 stars

Once Only Imagined is the debut studio album by Canadian metal band The Agonist.

The video for "Business Suits and Combat Boots" was filmed by acclaimed director David Brodsky (Strapping Young Lad, Gwar, God Forbid) and was released on September 21, 2007. The video was voted the number 6 video of the year 2007 on MTV2's Headbanger's Ball.

== Track listing ==
- All lyrics written by Alissa White-Gluz
- All songs composed by Danny Marino, Alissa White-Gluz, and Chris Kells

No.	Title	Length
1.	"Synopsis"	0:32
2.	"Rise and Fall"	4:02
3.	"Born Dead, Buried Alive"	4:32
4.	"Take a Bow"	4:05
5.	"Trophy Kill"	3:39
6.	"Business Suits and Combat Boots"	5:27
7.	"Serendipity"	3:42
8.	"Memento Mori"	3:09
9.	"Void of Sympathy"	4:21
10.	"Chiaroscuro"	1:06
11.	"Forget Tomorrow"	3:37
Total length:		38:17

Japanese Bonus Track
No.	Title	Length
12.	"Feel No Guilt"	4:41
Total length:		42:58

== Personnel ==
The Agonist

- Alissa White-Gluz – lead vocals
- Danny Marino – guitars
- Chris Kells – bass, backing vocals (tracks 3, 6, 7 and 11)

Additional personnel

- Derek Nadon – drums, percussion
- Christian Donaldson – vocals (track 6)

Production

- Produced by Christian Donalson, Alissa White-Gluz, Danny Marino and Chris Kells (2005–2006)
- Recorder at Studio Garage with Christian Donaldson (2005–2006)
- Mastered by Alan Douches at West Side Music (2006–2007)
