= Eye of Providence (album) =

Studio album by The Agonist
- Released: February 23, 2015
- Genres: Melodic death metal, metalcore, deathcore
- Length: 58:45
- Label: Century Media Records
- Producers: The Agonist, Christian Donaldson

The Agonist chronology
Prisoners (2012)	Eye of Providence (2015)	Five (2016)

Singles from Eye Of Providence
- 1. "Gates of Horn and Ivory" Released: January 15, 2015; 2. "My Witness, Your Victim" Released: January 29, 2015; 3. "A Gentle Disease" Released: February 11, 2015; 4. "Danse Macabre" Released: April 7, 2015; 5. "Follow The Crossed Line" Released: September 24, 2015

Eye of Providence is the fourth studio album by Canadian metal band The Agonist. It was released on February 23, 2015 in Europe and the following day in North America. It is the first full-length album featuring vocalist Vicky Psarakis since the departure of founding member and original vocalist Alissa White-Gluz in 2014. The album received general acclaim from critics, with many applauding the utilization of Psarakis' vocals and her distinction from White-Gluz.

Professional ratings
Review scores
Source	Rating
About.com	3.5/5 stars
Damnation Magazine	4.5/5 stars
Metal Addicts	10/10 stars
Metal Forces Magazine	8/10 stars
Planet Mosh	4/5 stars
Soundscape Magazine	9/10 stars
Sputnikmusic	3/5 stars
The Front Row Report	8.5/10 stars
The Headbanging Moose	4/5 stars
The Metal Pit	4/5 stars

== Track listing ==
All lyrics are written by Danny Marino and Vicky Psarakis, except where noted; all music is composed by Marino, Chris Kells and Simon McKay, except where noted.

No.	Title	Lyrics	Music	Length
1.	"Gates of Horn and Ivory"	Marino; McKay; Vicky Psarakis		3:25
2.	"My Witness, Your Victim"	Marino; McKay; Psarakis		4:47
3.	"Danse Macabre"	Psarakis	Marino; Kells; Pascal Jobin; McKay	4:01
4.	"I Endeavour"	Psarakis	Jobin; Kells; McKay	4:08
5.	"Faceless Messenger"			5:00
6.	"Perpetual Notion"			4:34
7.	"A Necessary Evil"		Marino; Kells; Jobin; McKay	3:44
8.	"Architects Hallucinate"	McKay; Psarakis	Kells; McKay	4:30
9.	"Disconnect Me"			3:32
10.	"The Perfect Embodiment"			5:13
11.	"A Gentle Disease"	Psarakis	Marino	3:45
12.	"Follow the Crossed Line"		Marino; Kells; Jobin; McKay	4:11
13.	"As Above, So Below"			7:55
Total length:				58:45

== Personnel ==
- Vicky Psarakis – vocals
- Danny Marino – lead guitar
- Pascal "Paco" Jobin – rhythm guitar
- Chris Kells – bass, backing vocals
- Simon McKay – drums

== Charts ==
Chart (2015)	Peak position
Billboard Heatseekers Albums	17
Japanese Albums	108
