= Five (The Agonist album) =

Studio album by The Agonist
- Released: September 30, 2016
- Recorded: 2016
- Studios: West Valley Studios, Woodland Hills, California
- Genres: Melodic death metal, metalcore
- Length: 53:16
- Label: Napalm
- Producer: Mike Plotnikoff

The Agonist chronology
Eye of Providence (2015)	Five (2016)	Orphans (2019)

Singles from Five
- 1. "The Chain" Released: July 20, 2016; 2. "The Moment" Released: August 12, 2016; 3. "The Hunt" Released: September 29, 2016; 4. "The Man Who Fell to Earth" Released: November 3, 2016; 5. "Take Me to Church" Released: January 18, 2017

Professional ratings
Review scores
Source	Rating
Distorted Sound	8/10
Metal Hammer	3.5/5 stars

Five is the fifth studio album by Canadian metal band the Agonist. Five is the band's second full-length album with vocalist Vicky Psarakis. The album was released on September 30, 2016 through Napalm Records.

== Track listing ==
All tracks are written by The Agonist, except where noted.

No.	Title	Length
1.	"The Moment"	4:14
2.	"The Chain"	3:12
3.	"The Anchor and The Sail"	3:49
4.	"The Game"	2:50
5.	"The Ocean"	4:27
6.	"The Hunt"	3:35
7.	"The Raven Eyes"	5:35
8.	"The Wake"	2:44
9.	"The Resurrection"	5:22
10.	"The Villain"	5:00
11.	"The Pursuit of Emptiness"	4:03
12.	"The Man Who Fell to Earth"	3:53
13.	"The Trial"	4:33

The Bonus
No.	Title	Writer(s)	Length
14.	"Take Me to Church" (Hozier cover)	Andrew Hozier-Byrne	3:46
Total length:			57:02

== Personnel ==
The Agonist

- Vicky Psarakis – lead vocals, string composition
- Danny Marino – lead guitar
- Pascal "Paco" Jobin – rhythm guitar
- Chris Kells – bass, backing vocals
- Simon McKay – drums

Additional

- Mike Plotnikoff – production and mixing
- Igor Khoroshev – mixing (track 8), string arrangements
- Hatsazuki "Hatch" Inagaki – engineer
- Maor Appelbaum – mastering
- Gustavo Sazes – artwork

== Charts ==
Chart (2016)	Peak position
Japanese Albums	123
