= Melina Soochan =

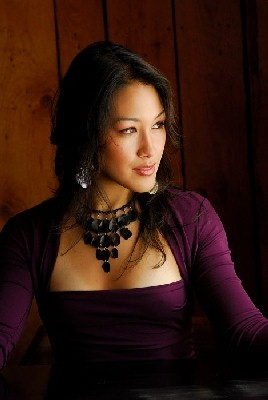
- Melina Soochan – 2008

Background information
- Born: May 17, 1985 (age 41); Montreal, Quebec, Canada
- Genres: Blues, R&B, Jazz, Classical
- Occupations: Musician, singer-songwriter
- Instruments: Piano, vocals
- Years active: 2001–present
- Website: melinasoochan.com

Melina Soochan is a Canadian singer-songwriter from Montreal, Quebec.

She is a classically trained pianist with a Bachelor of Music from McGill University in Montreal and an ARCT from the Royal Conservatory of Music of Toronto.

Melina's original music is a fusion of styles, a blend of acoustic urban and indie pop, R&B, jazz, soul and folk. She can be seen and heard performing in various Montreal area venues, with occasional appearances in places like Toronto, Ottawa and New York.

A member of SOCAN, Melina has filmed four official music videos, the first two of which are based on songs from her debut album entitled City of Love, the third one is based on a song from her first full-length album Hold On, while the forth one is based on a song from her latest album (currently still in production), Dark Fairytales. The music videos are entitled X-Ray Eyes, City of Love, The Mama Song and Predictable.

Melina has also performed quite often with various bands, notably Patrick Lehman, the Dropbeat Kings, the KIX party Band, etc.

As she is continually expanding her repertoire to include genres such as Jazz, she now performs regularly with one of her own bands, Melina Soochan's Jazz Ensemble, The Masters of Groove and The Velvet Lounge.

As of 2022 she has been living with her musician husband, Elijah Taj Gee, in the Fort Lauderdale, Florida, USA.

Melina's latest regular act is performing at Howling at the Moon in Fort Lauderdale.

== Bio ==
Born (May 17, 1985) and raised in Montreal, Melina started composing and recording music for various school projects in high-school.

During high-school (Riverdale HS, in Pierrefonds) she was active in the school band and participated in numerous student talent shows.

At the age of 15 she was briefly part of a rock band (Fubar), together with 2 high-school friends, and they entered the Granby Note Festival 2000 (for music students of all ages) where they won gold medals for performing one of Melina's early original songs and some classic rock covers. Later in 2000 Melina and the other two band members (Brandon Posner and Eliott Hayut) won the Pfizer Young Achiever Award.

She entered and won the 2001 RapSohD Talented Teen Competition., and went on to represent Canada at the Hal Jackson Talented Teens International (HJTTI) Scholarship Competition in New York later that same year. There she performed one of her early original songs and won the Wilda Labrie Scholarship. At the HJTTI competition she met a young guest artist who has greatly inspired her ever since, Alicia Keys.

As part of the RapSohD organization, Melina met and later performed as a guest artist in two concerts (March 2005 and May 2009) given by Lorraine Klaasen.

She also found time to study and practice Kyokushin kaikan karate and obtained her black belt at the age of 16. She won trophies in many karate tournaments, both for kata and combat. Throughout high-school and junior college she was also actively playing rugby, and continuing her piano studies, as well as composing and performing her original music at any opportunity.

After high-school she went on to Marianopolis College in Montreal to get a double diploma in Music and Science (2005). Subsequently, she received a Bachelor of Music from McGill University in Montreal (2008) and has received the ARCT from the Royal Conservatory of Music in Toronto. In the spring of 2015 Melina achieved an MBA from Concordia University's John Molson School of Business.

From 2006 until 2008 Melina was a regular member of the cast of the Belluscious Girls, a Montreal cabaret troupe that have performed at many events, such as La Relève en folie 2006 fund raiser.

In 2010, with the help of Artists Alliance Productions in association with Global NTT, Melina started producing the regular series called Acoustic Nights Montreal, which take place in various venues in Montreal every two months and showcase a different set of five or six singer/songwriters (in solo/duo/trio acts) who perform their original music acoustically, without the help of electronic enhancements. Artists such as SuLE, Patrick Lehman and Sabrina Correa, to name just a few, have been featured, alongside Melina.

Melina launched her first full-length album Hold On in September 2011 at Upstairs Jazz in Montreal.

Her second full-length album The Velvet Lounge, consisting of 13 jazz standards, was launched on April 26, 2018 at Montreal's House of Jazz.

Her third full-length album Dark Fairytales is in production and a release date is scheduled for the end of 2022 or early 2023. Three singles have been released so far.

== Discography ==
- 6-song EP City of Love 2009
  - X-Ray Eyes
  - City of Love
  - Place in My Heart
  - Fireflies
  - New Phase
  - Threadbare
- 10-song LP Hold On 2011
  - Bang Bang
  - Hold On
  - Blu-Ray Blues
  - Hey
  - Love's Got Me Livin'
  - The Mama Song
  - Over and Out
  - New Phase
  - Royal Flush
  - Hold On (acoustic)
- 13-song LP The Velvet Lounge 2018
  - At Last
  - Fever
  - Georgia On My Mind
  - Besame Mucho
  - Moondance
  - Cry Me a River
  - Les Feuilles Mortes
  - The Girl From Ipanema
  - Summertime
  - This Masquerade
  - The Look of Love
  - Save the Last Dance for Me
  - La Vie en Rose

== Videography ==
- Official Music Videos
  - X-Ray Eyes 2009
  - City of Love 2010
  - The Mama Song 2011
  - This Light 2014 (collaboration with The Montreal and Toronto Reggae Collective)
  - Predictable 2022
  - Waiting 2022 (visualizer)
  - Drowning 2022 (visualizer)

== Collaborations ==
Melina has been collaborating with several other established musicians such as singer-songwriter guitarist Sule Heitner, electronica producer Override, metal band The Agonist and The Montreal and Toronto Reggae Collective.
