= Firefight (album) =

Studio album by Blackguard
- Released: March 29, 2011
- Recorded: July 2010 – March 2011
- Genre: Melodic death metal, power metal, folk metal, symphonic metal
- Length: 43:32
- Label: Victory Records
- Producer: Blackguard, Paul "Ablaze" Zinay, Kim Gosselin, Étienne Mailloux, Jonathan Lefrancois-Leduc

Blackguard chronology
Profugus Mortis (2009)	Firefight (2011)

Professional ratings
Review scores
Source	Rating
Metal Assault	9.5/10 stars
Metal Storm	(7.8/10)
Sputnikmusic	4/5 stars
Alter The Press!	3.5/5 stars

Firefight is the third studio album by Canadian melodic death metal band Blackguard, released on March 29, 2011, via Victory Records. Unlike its predecessor, this album contains elements of power metal and symphonic metal based on the band's melodic death metal root, much like in Children of Bodom's vein.

== Track listing ==
All songs written by Paul "Ablaze" Zinay and Kim Gosselin, except noted.

No.	Title	Length
1.	"Tephra" (Gosselin)	0:34
2.	"Firefight" (Zinay, Étienne Mailloux)	5:04
3.	"Farewell" (Zinay, Jonathan Lefrancois Leduc)	4:08
4.	"Wastelands"	6:20
5.	"Cruel Hands"	4:44
6.	"Iblis" (Mailloux)	2:54
7.	"The Fear of All Flesh"	4:53
8.	"A Blinding Light"	5:15
9.	"The Path"	5:00
10.	"Sarissas"	4:44
Total length:		43:32

== Personnel ==
Blackguard

- Paul "Ablaze" Zinay – lead vocals
- Kim Gosselin - lead guitar, orchestrations
- Terry "Roadcase" Deschenes – rhythm guitar
- Étienne Mailloux – bass guitar
- Justine "Juice" Ethier – drums, percussion
