= The Agonist =

Canadian metal band

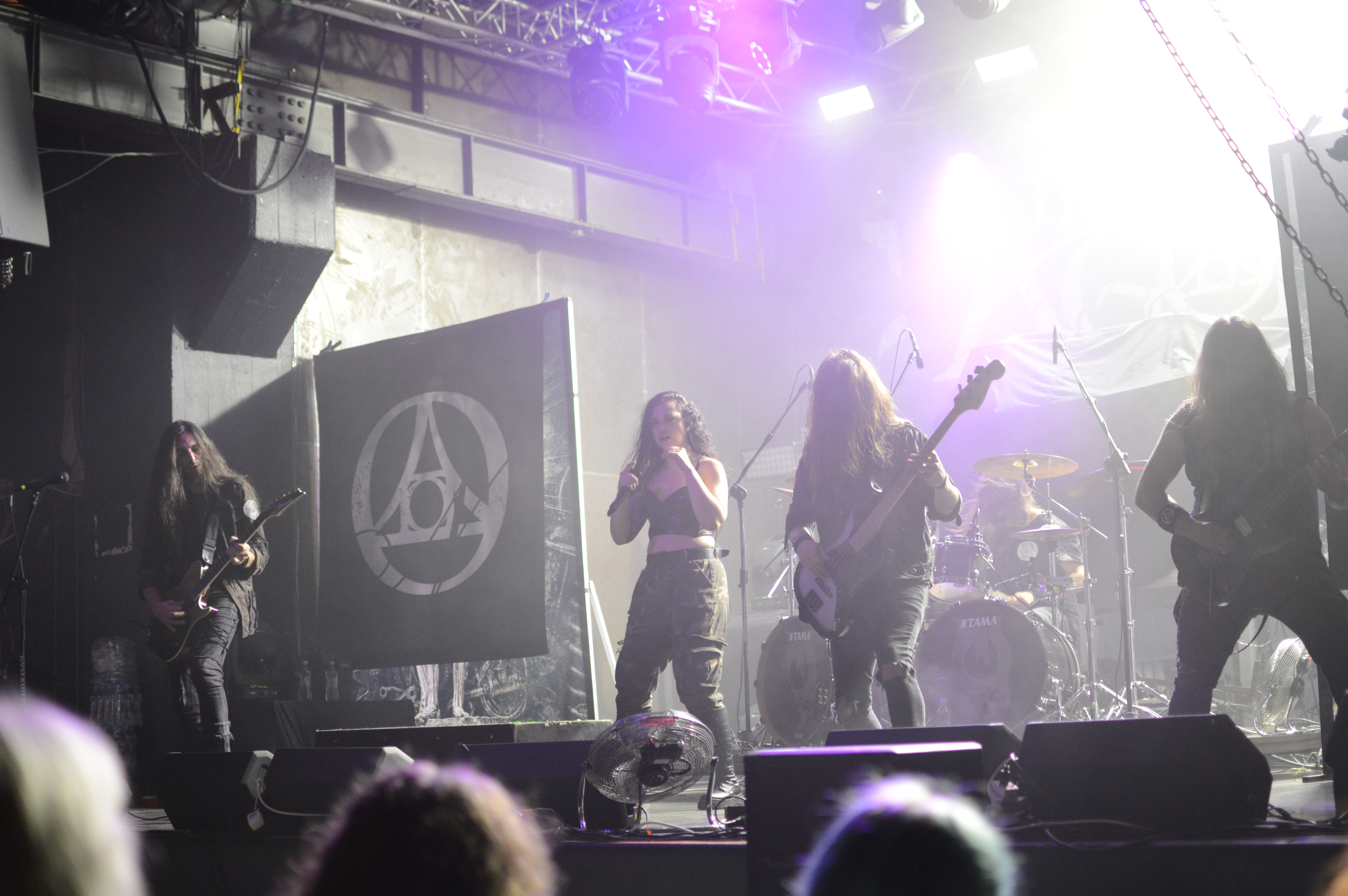
- The Agonist in Gdańsk, 2022

Background information
- Origin: Montreal, Quebec, Canada
- Genres: Melodic death metal; metalcore; deathcore
- Years active: 2004–2023
- Labels: Napalm Records; Century Media; Act; Spiritual Beast; Rodeostar Records
- Past members: Danny Marino; Chris Kells; Simon McKay; Pascal Jobin; Vicky Psarakis; Alissa White-Gluz; Andrew Tapley; Chris Adolph; Pavlo Haikalis

The Agonist was a Canadian metalcore and melodic death metal band from Montreal, Quebec, formed in 2004. The last known lineup consisted of lead guitarist Danny Marino, bassist Chris Kells, drummer Simon Mckay, rhythm guitarist Pascal "Paco" Jobin, and lead vocalist Vicky Psarakis, who joined in March 2014 following the departure of vocalist and founding member Alissa White-Gluz.

Originally known as the Tempest, the band adopted their current moniker upon signing to Century Media in 2007. The Agonist released six studio albums; the last, Orphans, was released in September 2019. They shared the stage with bands such as Arsonists Get All the Girls, Epica, the Faceless, Chelsea Grin, Kamelot, and Visions of Atlantis. They disbanded in May 2023.

== History ==
=== Once Only Imagined (2004−2008) ===
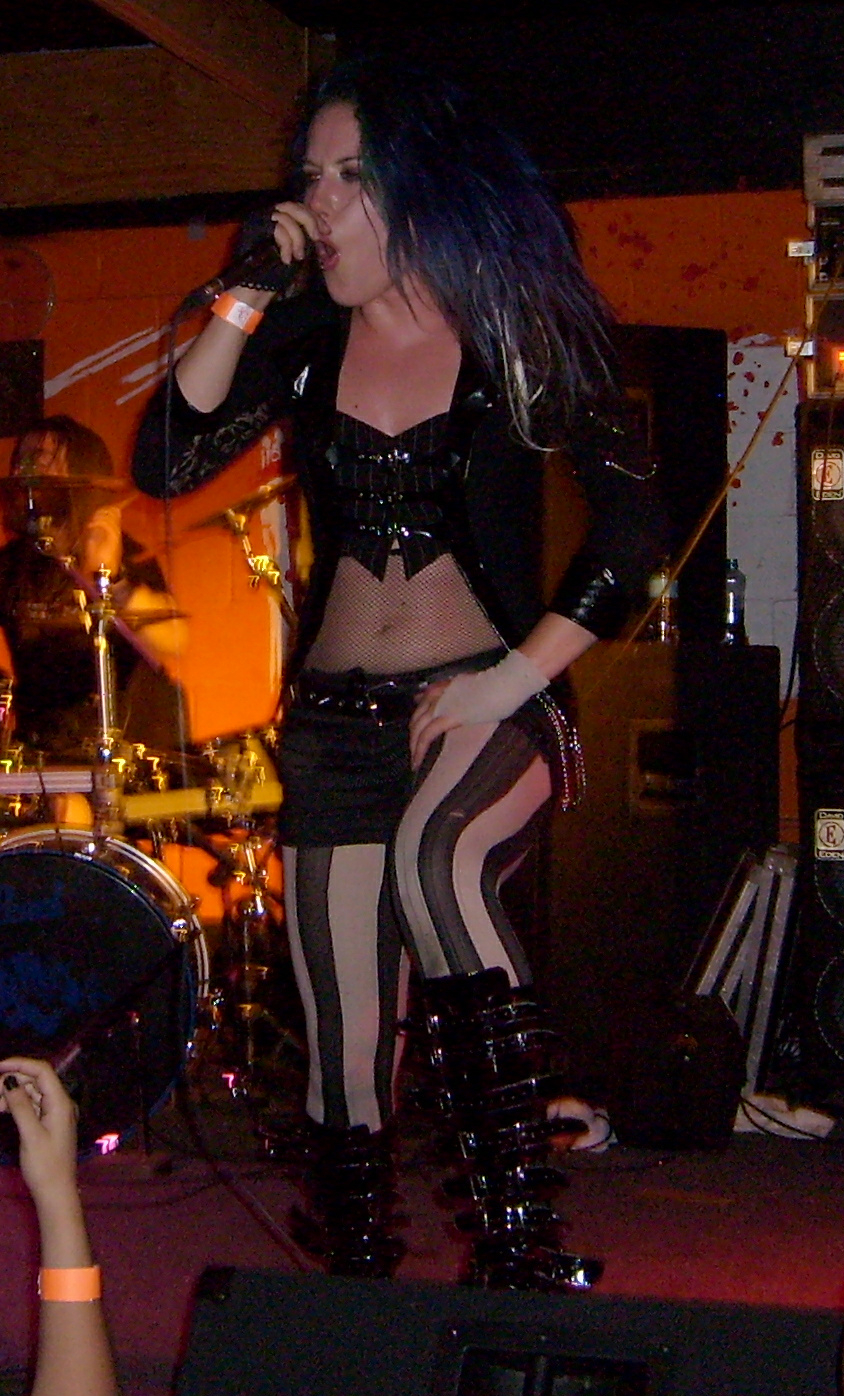
Alissa White-Gluz, the former vocalist of The Agonist.

The band released their first album, Once Only Imagined, on August 14, 2007. Intended as a demo, the release prompted the Agonist to add drummer Simon McKay. Released August 28, 2007, the video for "Business Suits and Combat Boots" was filmed by director David Brodsky (Strapping Young Lad, Gwar, God Forbid). The video was voted the number 6 video of the year 2007 on MTV2's Headbanger's Ball.

After releasing the album, the Agonist toured with God Forbid, Arsis, Sonata Arctica, Overkill, Visions of Atlantis, and Enslaved. One of the band's tours was disrupted when a blizzard damaged their equipment trailer in the Rocky Mountains. White-Gluz was named one of "the hottest chicks in metal" in the July 2007 issue of Revolver.

=== Lullabies for the Dormant Mind (2008−2010) ===
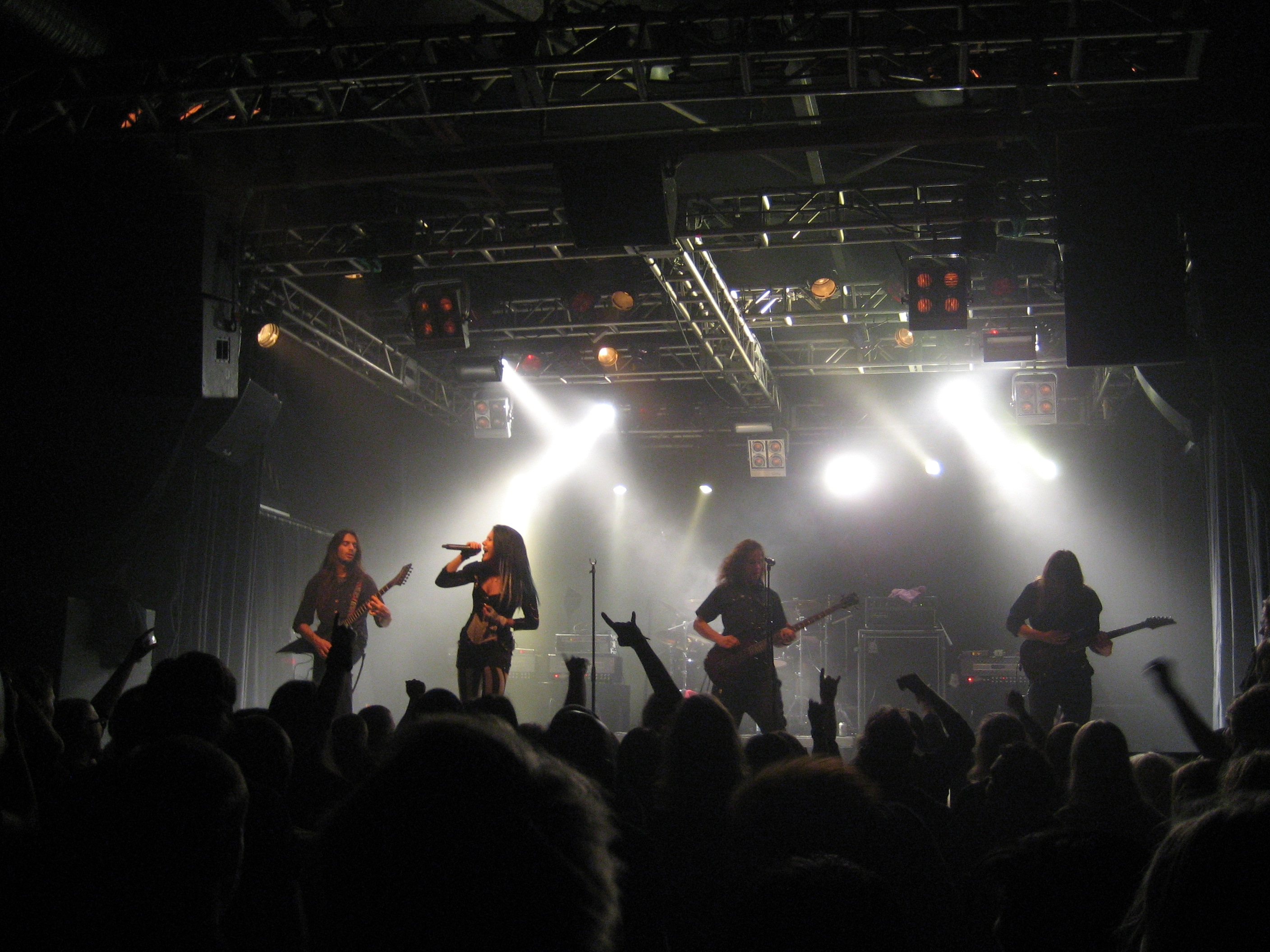
The Agonist performing in Helsinki in 2010.

The band released their second album, Lullabies for the Dormant Mind, in March 2009. The mini-video for "...And Their Eulogies Sang Me To Sleep", also filmed by David Brodsky, was released April 18, 2009. On April 22, they released the video for "Birds Elope With The Sun," consisting of live concert footage from the band's tour. Their third video, for the single "Thank You Pain", premiered on the Peta2 Blog on September 3, 2009. The band became popular with the release of Lullabies for the Dormant Mind, mostly for their single / video "Thank You Pain". The album debuted at No. 105 on the Billboard Heatseeksers album charts. White-Gluz appeared in March on Blackguard's album Profugus Mortis on the song "The Sword". She was again named the "hottest chick in metal" in the May 2009 issue of Revolver.

While touring Lullabies for the Dormant Mind, the Agonist made their first trips to Mexico, Venezuela, Japan, China, Colombia, and toured Europe. They toured with Epica and Scar Symmetry in December 2010.

=== Prisoners (2011–2013) ===
In late 2011, the Agonist took part in Kamelot's Pandemonium Over North America 2010 Tour with Alestorm and Blackguard. Marino was unable to tour with the band and was replaced with ex-Catalyst guitarist Justin Deguire. While on tour, the band sold the EP The Escape, two tracks scheduled to appear on the band's third full-length album. It was mixed by Tue Madsen (the Haunted, Dark Tranquillity, Suicide Silence).

White-Gluz told metalconcerts.net that the band's music had become more mature, not necessarily heavier or more melodic. She elaborated by saying there are more "classic" influences like Pantera and Radiohead. She told Lithium Magazine that the record could be good for someone with an open-minded musical taste, or bad for someone who only likes Thank You, Pain. The album's final recording processes took place after the Kamelot tour. It was produced by the band's long-time producer Christian Donaldson.

The Agonist released the album Prisoners on June 4, 2012 via Century Media records. "Ideomotor" was the first single. The video of "Panophobia" was released October 24, 2012, and featured live and behind-the-scenes footage of the band playing Montreal's Heavy Montréal Festival. In support of Prisoners, the Agonist toured with Danzig and Corrosion of Conformity in North America, and Aldious in Japan.

=== White-Gluz's departure, Eye of Providence and Five (2014–2016) ===
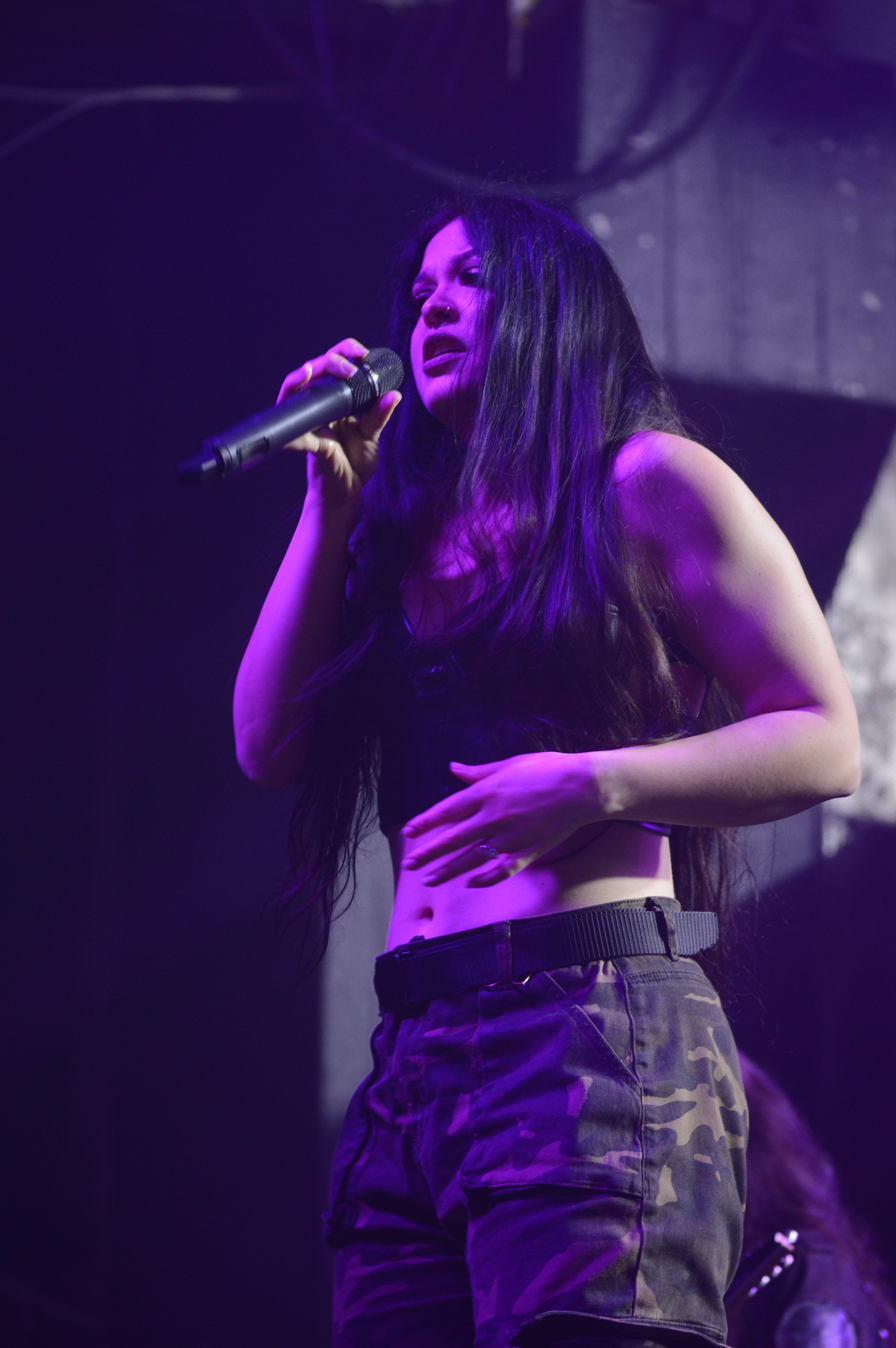
Vicky Psarakis was the vocalist of The Agonist, following White-Gluz's departure.

In March 2014, White-Gluz announced that she had been chosen to replace Angela Gossow as frontwoman of Swedish melodic death metal band Arch Enemy. She revealed that the group knew it was "over" and that they had parted ways. Vicky Psarakis was revealed as the new lead singer of the group. In April 2017, White-Gluz detailed the circumstances of her departure and how she considered it the "worst betrayal" she had ever felt in her life. The Agonist later released their own public statement disputing her account, citing unprofessional behavior and disrespect for fans and band mates as the reason for her departure, and that the band was "breathing a lot easier" without her. Their fourth album, Eye of Providence, was released on February 23. The EP Disconnect Me was released in April. The album Five was released on September 30, 2016.

=== Orphans, Days Before the World Wept and disbandment (2019–2023) ===
On June 7, 2019, the band released the single "In Vertigo". Their album Orphans was released on September 20, 2019 through Rodeostar Records. Orphans was nominated as Metal/Hard Music Album of the Year at the Juno Awards of 2020.

From January 7–11, 2020, the band took part in the 70000 Tons of Metal cruise, which was 37 metal bands playing, at sea, on the "Royal Caribbean Independence of the Seas". The day before departure, Kells announced that he would be unable to go on the cruise, and that he was banned from entering the United States for five years. Kells issued an explanation, and announced that Pavlo Haikalis would fill in for him. The Agonist was booked to tour the western US in support of Fleshgod Apocalypse, but those dates were cancelled due to Covid restrictions. The band traveled to Portugal for Laurus Nobilis Music Famalicão 2020.

On September 9, 2021, the band released the song "Remnants in Time". On October 15, they released the EP Days Before the World Wept.

On May 10, 2023, the band disbanded due to "a mix of personal, financial and industry related issues".

== Musical style ==
The Agonist are known primarily for both White-Gluz and Psarakis' integration of death growls and clean vocals, and Marino's use of two or more intersecting melodies and unorthodox chords that often feature wide intervals and octave displacements. Themes revolve around animal rights, societal dilemmas, and the state of the world.

== Band members ==
Final lineup

- Danny Marino – lead guitar (2004–2023), rhythm guitar (2004–2007)
- Chris Kells – bass, backing vocals (2004–2023)
- Simon McKay – drums (2007–2023)
- Pascal "Paco" Jobin – rhythm guitar (2010–2023)
- Vicky Psarakis – lead vocals (2014–2023)

Former

- Derek Nadon – drums (2004–2007)
- Andrew Tapley – rhythm guitar (2007–2008)
- Chris Adolph – rhythm guitar (2008–2010)
- Alissa White-Gluz – lead vocals (2004–2014)

Live

- Justin Deguire – rhythm guitar (2011)
- Pavlo Haikalis - bass, backing vocals (2020, 2022)

Timeline

== Discography ==
=== Studio albums ===
| Year | Title |
|---|---|
| 2007 | Once Only Imagined |
| 2009 | Lullabies for the Dormant Mind |
| 2012 | Prisoners |
| 2015 | Eye of Providence |
| 2016 | Five |
| 2019 | Orphans |

=== EPs ===
| Year | Title |
|---|---|
| 2011 | The Escape |
| 2014 | Disconnect Me |
| 2021 | Days Before the World Wept |

=== Singles ===
| Year | Title | Album |
|---|---|---|
| 2007 | "Business Suits and Combat Boots" | Once Only Imagined |
| 2009 | "...and Their Eulogies Sang Me to Sleep" | Lullabies for the Dormant Mind |
| 2009 | "Birds Elope with the Sun" | Lullabies for the Dormant Mind |
| 2009 | "Thank You Pain" | Lullabies for the Dormant Mind |
| 2011 | "The Escape" | Prisoners |
| 2012 | "Ideomotor" | Prisoners |
| 2012 | "Panophobia" | Prisoners |
| 2014 | "Disconnect Me" | Eye of Providence |
| 2015 | "Gates of Horn and Ivory" | Eye of Providence |
| 2015 | "My Witness, Your Victim" | Eye of Providence |
| 2015 | "Danse Macabre" | Eye of Providence |
| 2016 | "The Chain" | Five |
| 2016 | "The Moment" | Five |
| 2016 | "Take Me to Church" | Five |
| 2019 | "In Vertigo" | Orphans |
| 2019 | "Burn It All Down" | Orphans |
| 2019 | "As One We Survive" | Orphans |
| 2019 | "The Gift of Silence" | Orphans |
| 2020 | "Orphans" | Orphans |
| 2021 | "Remnants in Time" | Days Before the World Wept |
| 2021 | "Feast On the Living" | Days Before the World Wept |

=== Music videos ===
| Year | Title | Album |
|---|---|---|
| 2007 | "Business Suits and Combat Boots" | Once Only Imagined |
| | "...and Their Eulogies Sang Me to Sleep" | Lullabies for the Dormant Mind |
| 2009 | "Thank You Pain" | Lullabies for the Dormant Mind |
| 2009 | "Birds Elope with the Sun" | Lullabies for the Dormant Mind |
| 2012 | "Panophobia" | Prisoners |
| 2015 | "Gates of Horn and Ivory" | Eye of Providence |
| 2015 | "My Witness, Your Victim" | Eye of Providence |
| 2015 | "A Gentle Disease" | Eye of Providence |
| 2015 | "Danse Macabre" | Eye of Providence |
| 2015 | "Follow the Crossed Line" | Eye of Providence |
| 2016 | "The Moment" | Five |
| 2016 | "The Hunt" | Five |
| 2016 | "The Man Who Fell to Earth" | Five |
| 2017 | "Take Me to Church" | Five |
| 2017 | "The Raven Eyes" | Five |
| 2019 | "In Vertigo" | Orphans |
| 2019 | "Burn It All Down" | Orphans |
| 2019 | "As One We Survive" | Orphans |
| 2019 | "The Gift of Silence" | Orphans |
| 2020 | "Orphans" | Orphans |
| 2021 | "Remnants in Time" | Days Before the World Wept |

== Awards and nominations ==
=== Juno Award ===
| Year | Nominee / work | Award | Result | Ref. |
|---|---|---|---|---|
| 2020 | Orphans | Metal/Hard Music Album of the Year | Nominated | |
| 2022 | Days Before the World Wept | Metal/Hard Music Album of the Year | Nominated | |
