= Blackguard (band) =

Canadian metal band

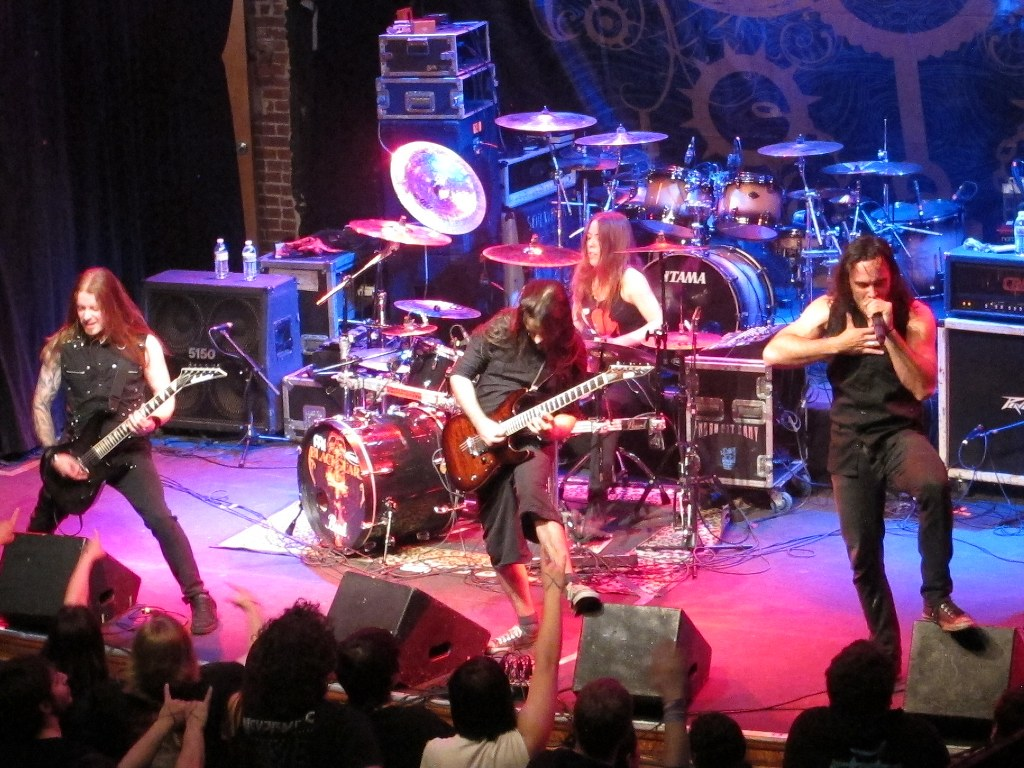
- Blackguard in 2013

Background information
- Also known as: Profugus Mortis
- Origin: Montréal, Québec
- Genres: Melodic death metal, symphonic metal, folk metal
- Years active: 2001–present
- Labels: Nuclear Blast; Caustic Rhythms (2007); Prodisk (2007–2008); Sumerian (2009–2010); Victory
- Members: Paul "Ablaze" Zinay; Terry "Roadcase" Deschenes; Justine Ethier; Jonathan Lefrançois-Leduc; David Gagné; Vincent Harnois
- Past members: Kim Gosselin; Émilie Livernois; Alkin; Mordred; Étienne Mailloux; Louis Jacques

Blackguard is a Canadian melodic death metal band from Montréal, Québec, previously known as Profugus Mortis.

== History ==
=== Formation, So It Begins and Profugus Mortis (2001–2008) ===
Blackguard was formed in 2001 by guitarist Terry Roadcase and drummer Justine "Juice" Éthier as a black metal band. The Montreal-based sextet was named Profugus Mortis (Latin for "Fugitive of Death"). Blackguard was officially born with the addition of vocalist Paul Ablaze in October 2004, followed a month later by bassist Étienne Mailloux. Adhering to their black metal roots, the new Profugus Mortis leaned toward Scandinavian folk metal.

Blackguard issued a four-song self-produced demo in March 2005, passing them out for free at metal shows in Montreal. In July that year, Profugus Mortis played the Xtreme Distortion Fest in Montreal with Kataklysm and Unexpect, winning the coveted slot as "Best Unsigned Band" at the event. This translated into a support slot with Sodom and Finntroll, which earned Profugus Mortis the opportunity to open for Yngwie Malmsteen at the request of Québec's Capital du Metal.

Since then, Blackguard has supported and toured with Lacuna Coil, Catamenia, Warbringer, Behemoth, Therion, Epica, Into Eternity, Ensiferum, The Agonist, Cryptopsy, Krisiun, Voivod, Moonsorrow, Korpiklaani, and Quo Vadis.

Profugus Mortis' first professional recording was released in March 2007 and was named So It Begins. This was rather a collection of songs showcasing the band's past and their new direction. So It Begins became the best and fastest selling album in their label Prodisk's history. In January 2008, violinist Emilie Livernois was replaced by former Gotherfall guitarist Kim Gosselin.

The band was signed to Nuclear Blast after being selected as the winners of the label's "MySpace Band Contest". Their first major label debut was entitled Profugus Mortis as a tribute to their past.

Keyboardist Jonathan Lefrançois-Leduc left Blackguard in June 2010 after Hypocrisy's North American tour.

On October 12, 2010, it was announced that Blackguard had switched from Nuclear Blast to Victory Records.

=== Firefight (2009–2011) ===
After touring for several months before the release of their next album, Firefight, they began selling pre-orders for the album, which was released on March 29, 2011, through Victory Records. During the subsequent tour for Firefight, the band announced the departure of guitarist Kim Gosselin and welcomed Louis Jacques to the band as his replacement.

The band released this statement about it:

Unfortunately we must officially announce the departure of lead guitarist Kim Gosselin from Blackguard. For those of you who have seen us play during our last few tours this will not come as a shock seeing as Kim has been absent from the live lineup for quite some time. Kim has decided not to continue with the band, and we'd like to thank him for his invaluable contribution to this group over the years. As hard as it is seeing a brother go, this is truly the best thing for both parties as Kim's interest in touring and writing have been waning over the last year. We wanted to wait until we had found a suitable replacement before making any official announcement and we're very happy to finally be able to let everyone in on what's going on.

=== Storm (2012–present) ===
On June 17, 2012, Blackguard announced they have begun work on their next studio album.

Vocalist Paul Zinay released this official statement on the band's progress:

We are currently hard at work and pre-production is coming along very nice. Everyone here is ecstatic over the material we have. Our new guitarist Louis is a riff machine and working his ass off to help make this the best Blackguard album to date. The writing process this time around is unlike anything we've done before. In the past, one or two people would make up the vast majority of material for the album. This time, however, everyone is contributing ideas and music and the results are beyond my expectations. We will be heading into studio in September to start tracking and we're hoping to have the record out in early 2013. Lyrically, I'm taking a step into new territory by trying my hand at writing a concept album. This won't be as intricate or vast as The Emerald Sword Saga or The Metal Opera, but this will be an exciting and new challenge for me nonetheless.

After some delays, Blackguard returned to the studio in May 2013 for their new album Storm at Silver Wings Studios in Montreal, Quebec. Initial sessions for the album were thought to have taken place back in September. On October 31, 2013, the band announced the departure of bassist Etienne Mailloux from their lineup. The group then enlisted Dave "Ablaze" Zinay as his replacement. Dave is the twin brother of the band's lead vocalist, Paul.

On May 10, 2014, the band announced on their Facebook page that Vocalist Paul Zinay will be finishing vocal tracks for Storm. On September 22, 2014, the band announced via Facebook, that the album was done. The release date was January 3, 2020.

== Band members ==
=== Current ===
- Terry "Roadcase" Deschenes – rhythm guitar (2001–present)
- Justine "Juice" Ethier – drums (2001–present)
- Paul "Ablaze" Zinay – vocals (2004–present)
- Jonathan Lefrançois-Leduc – keyboards, synthesizers (2003–2010, 2024–present)
- David Gagné – lead guitar (2024–present; touring 2013–2024)
- Vincent Harnois - bass (2024–present)

=== Former ===
- Louis Jacques (2012–2015) – lead guitar
- Étienne Mailloux (2004–2013) – bass
- Kim Gosselin (2008–2012) – lead guitar
- Émilie Livernois (2003–2007) – violin, live growls
- Alkin (François Auger) (2001–2004) – vocals
- Mordred (2003–2004) – bass
- Erik Tisinger (2011) – touring lead guitar
- Gabriel Guardian (2011–2012) – touring lead guitar
- Chris Kells (2012) - touring bass

=== Producers ===
- Jean-François Dagenais (So It Begins, Profugus Mortis) – mixed and engineered for studio recording
- Jonathan Lefrançois-Leduc (Storm) mixed and engineered for studio recording

== Discography ==
=== Studio albums ===
- So It Begins (2007)
- Profugus Mortis (2009)
- Firefight (2011)
- Storm (2020)

=== EPs ===
- Another Round (2008)

=== Singles ===
- "United Under a Shadowed Nightsky" (2004)
- "Firefight" (2011)

=== Demos ===
- United Under a Shadowed Nightsky (2003)
- Démo (2005)
