= Sads (band) =

Japanese band

- Origin: Tokyo, Japan
- Genres: Hard rock; punk rock; hardcore punk; heavy metal; nu metal; post-punk; glam rock
- Years active: 1999–2003, 2010–2018
- Labels: Universal; Full Face; Toshiba EMI; BMG; Bouncy; Avex
- Members: Kiyoharu; K-A-Z; Go; Yutaro
- Past members: Taketomo Sakashita; Masaru Kobayashi; Tetsuhiro Tanuma; Eiji Mitsuzono; Masahiro Muta; Keisuke Kubota
- Website: sads-xxx.jp

Sads (typeset as sads and formerly as SADS) is originally a punk rock, post-punk and glam rock band formed in Japan in 1999. The band made its debut with the single "Tokyo". They released nine singles and five albums before their disbandment in 2003. In 2010, Sads reformed with a more hard rock/heavy metal sound and signed to the Avex label. They then released two albums and one single before entering a hiatus in 2018.

== History ==
Sads was formed by Kiyoharu, vocalist of the disbanded Kuroyume, in May 1999 and at the same time formed his own record label "Full Face". Their first live tour was held in the United Kingdom. Kiyoharu has said that the decision to tour internationally from the very beginning was to test Sads' ability to "compete worldwide".

Their first album, Sad Blood Rock'n'Roll, was a continuation of the bare-bones punk and garage rock from the last Kuroyume album, Corkscrew. Sads eventually delved more into glam rock and post-punk territory as their releases progressed.

In early 2010, Kiyoharu announced that Sads and Kuroyume would be resuming activities again, though the other original members of Sads would not be returning; instead, the band now included K-A-Z, the guitarist of the band Detrox, Keisuke Kubota, support bassist for the band 30size, and Go, leader and drummer of the band Suns Owl. They released their first album since reforming, The 7 Deadly Sins, on July 7, 2010.

Their official fanclub was originally called "Rubbersole", but was renamed "VIP" after reforming in 2010. The band entered a hiatus in 2018.

== Members ==
=== Final lineup ===
- Kiyoharu – vocals (1999-2003, 2010–2018) (Kuroyume)
- K-A-Z - guitar (2010–2018) (ex:Detrox, Raglaia)
- Go - drums (2010–2018) (Suns Owl, Zigoku Quartet)
- Yutaro - bass (2017–2018) (Undervár, ex:Jelly→, ex:Laid Back Ocean)

=== Former members ===
- Taketomo Sakashita – guitar (1999-2003) (The Dust 'n' Bonez, Bad Six Babies, The Slut Banks)
- Tetsuhiro Tanuma - bass (1999)
- Masaru Kobayashi – bass (2000-2003) (Nil, The Cro-Magnons)
- Keisuke Kubota - bass (2010-2017) (ex:Hayabusa Jones, Ohio101)
- Masahiro Muta - drums (1999-2001)
- Eiji Mitsuzono - drums (2001-2003) (The Dust 'n' Bonez, Ex:Wild Flag, Bow Wow, The Slut Banks)

== Discography ==
=== Albums ===
==== Studio albums ====
- Sad Blood Rock 'n' Roll (September 2, 1999)
- Babylon (June 7, 2000)
- The Rose God Gave Me (August 29, 2001)
- “ ”(untitled) (April 12, 2002)
- 13 (March 26, 2003)
- The 7 Deadly Sins (July 7, 2010)
- Lesson 2 (December 8, 2010)
- Erosion (June 14, 2014)
- Falling (October 24, 2018)

==== Compilations ====
- Greatest Hits ~Best Of 5 Years~ (July 9, 2003)
- Sads Rare Box "Recoup" (September 28, 2005)
  - The Rose God Gave Me L.A. Mix Version (Reissue: March 21, 2007)
  - Rare Tracks (Reissue: March 21, 2007)

=== Singles ===
- "Tokyo" (July 7, 1999)
- "Sandy" (October 14, 1999)
- "Nudity" (赤裸々, January 13, 2000)
- "Boukyaku no Sora" (忘却の空, April 12, 2000)
- "Strawberry" (ストロベリー, April 12, 2000)
- "Nightmare" (November 16, 2000)
- "Porno Star" (June 20, 2001)
- "Appetizing 4 Songs EP" (July 25, 2001)
- "Masquerade" (May 28, 2003)
- "Disco" (November 10, 2010)
- "Spin" (June 14, 2014)
- "May I Stay/Light of Life" (DVD single) (2015)
- "Freely (Venue Ver.)" (September 5, 2018)
