= Profugus Mortis (album) =

Studio album by Blackguard
- Released: April 28, 2009
- Recorded: November 2008–April 2009
- Genre: Melodic death metal, symphonic black metal, folk metal, power metal
- Length: 40:26
- Label: Sumerian Records
- Producer: Blackguard, Jean-François Dagenais, Paul "Ablaze" Zinay, Kim Gosselin, Étienne Mailloux, Jonathan Lefrancois-Leduc

Blackguard chronology
Another Round (2008)	Profugus Mortis (2009)	Firefight (2011)

Professional ratings
Review scores
Source	Rating
Spirit of Metal	(17/20)
Metal Storm	7.5/10 stars

Profugus Mortis is the second studio album by Canadian melodic death metal band Blackguard. This is their first release under the name "Blackguard", and it uses their old band name "Profugus Mortis" as the album title. This is also their last album to have a very strong folk metal influence since they have gotten into a more power metal sound. Paul Ablaze uses the term Epic Metal when he describes the genre of Blackguard as a whole. It combines the elements of folk, symphonic, power, black, and death metal to create the "Epic Metal" sound that they produce. Capitalizing on the best moments offered up on So It Begins, the new album is a folk metal onslaught that redefines the genre and raises the bar to an all-time high.

== Track listing ==
No.	Title	Length
1.	"Scarlet to Snow"	5:45
2.	"This Round's on Me"	4:16
3.	"Allegiance"	4:33
4.	"I Demon"	3:14
5.	"The Sword" (featuring Alissa White-Gluz of Arch Enemy)	4:56
6.	"In Time"	3:24
7.	"Cinder"	3:39
8.	"Vain"	5:15
9.	"The Last We Wage"	5:24
Total length:		40:26

Limited Edition
No.	Title	Length
1.	"Scarlet to Snow"	5:45
2.	"This Round's on Me"	4:16
3.	"Allegiance"	4:33
4.	"I Demon"	3:14
5.	"The Sword" (featuring Alissa White-Gluz of Arch Enemy)	4:56
6.	"The Journey" (Bonus track)	2:37
7.	"In Time"	3:24
8.	"Cinder"	3:39
9.	"Vain"	5:15
10.	"The Last We Wage"	5:24
Total length:		43:03

== Personnel ==
Blackguard

- Paul "Ablaze" Zinay – lead vocals
- Kim Gosselin – lead guitar
- Terry "Roadcase" Deschenes – rhythm guitar
- Étienne Mailloux – bass guitar
- Jonathan Lefrancois-Leduc – keyboards, synthesizers, orchestrations
- Justine "Juice" Ethier – drums

== Additional ==
- Jacques Jr. Gélinas – orchestrations on "Scarlet to Snow"
- Ophélie Gingras – orchestrations on "Scarlet to Snow"
- Alissa White-Gluz – vocals on "The Sword"

== See also ==
- Jean-François Dagenais
- Chasse-galerie
- Sumerian Records discography
