= Vicky Psarakis =

American singer

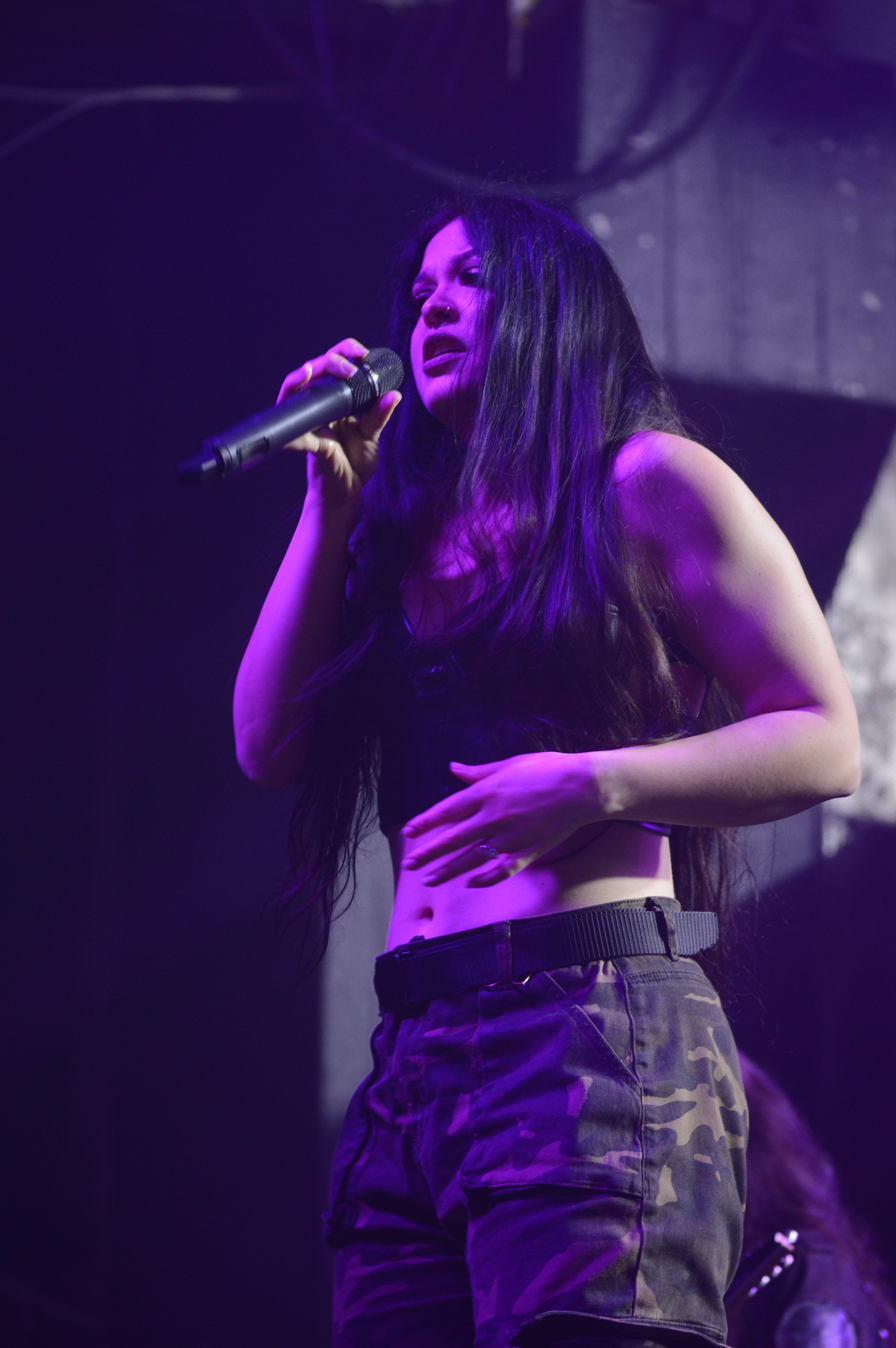
- Vicky Psarakis (2022)

Background information
- Born: June 22, 1988 (age 38); Chicago, Illinois, U.S.
- Occupations: Singer, songwriter, voice actor
- Years active: 2010–present
- Labels: Century Media, Napalm, Earache Records
- Spouse: Robby J. Fonts

Vicky Psarakis (born June 22, 1988) is an American singer, best known as the vocalist of American nu metal band Sicksense. She was the former vocalist of the Canadian heavy metal band The Agonist from 2014 to 2023. In 2021, she launched the band, Sicksense. She has also worked on other projects like E.V.E and Rage of Romance. Psarakis also voices Ada Wong in the asymmetrical horror video game Dead By Daylight and has been a featured vocalist in the Call of Duty franchise appearing on the soundtrack songs "Slave" and "No One There" from Call of Duty: Black Ops 6 and Call of Duty: Black Ops 7, respectively.

== Personal life ==
Psarakis was born in Chicago to Greek parents. She moved to Greece at the age of 10.

She has a YouTube channel where she mainly uploads vocal covers. In August 2020, she joined creator platform Patreon. In early 2021, she also started streaming on Twitch.

Psarakis provided spoken word vocals for one track on Epica's 2021 album Omega.

She's married to Stuck Mojo vocalist Robby Fonts who is also her Sicksense bandmate.

== Discography ==
=== E.V.E ===
- Equations Vanquish Equality (2012)

=== Rage of Romance ===
- Rage of Romance (2014)

=== The Agonist ===
Studio albums:

- Eye of Providence (2015)
- Five (2016)
- Orphans (2019)

EPs:

- Disconnect Me (2014)
- Days Before the World Wept (2021)

=== Sicksense ===
Studio albums:

- Cross Me Twice (2025)

EPs:

- Kings Today (2022)
- Fools Tomorrow (2023)
- Funerals (2026)

== Filmography ==
=== Video games ===
Year	Title	Role
2021	Marvel's Guardians of the Galaxy	Additional voices
2022	Dead by Daylight	Ada Wong
2024	Call of Duty: Black Ops 6	Slave (song), Citadelle Des Morts DLC
2026	Call of Duty: Black Ops 7	No One There (song), Totenreich DLC
