= Cyntia =

Japanese all-female heavy metal band

- Origin: Tokyo, Japan
- Genres: Heavy metal; power metal
- Years active: 2011–2018, 2024
- Labels: Bright Star / Spinning; Victor; Village Again Association
- Members: Yui; Saki; Azu
- Past members: Airi; Kanoko; Ayano
- Website: cyntia.jp

Cyntia was a Japanese heavy metal band formed in 2011. They are believed to have been the first act from the Girls Metal Band Boom to have signed to a major record label when they joined Victor Entertainment in 2013. Drummer and co-founder Kanoko left the group in April 2015, and the band moved to the Village Again Association label for their 2016 album Urban Night. Cyntia began an indefinite hiatus after January 13, 2018.

== History ==
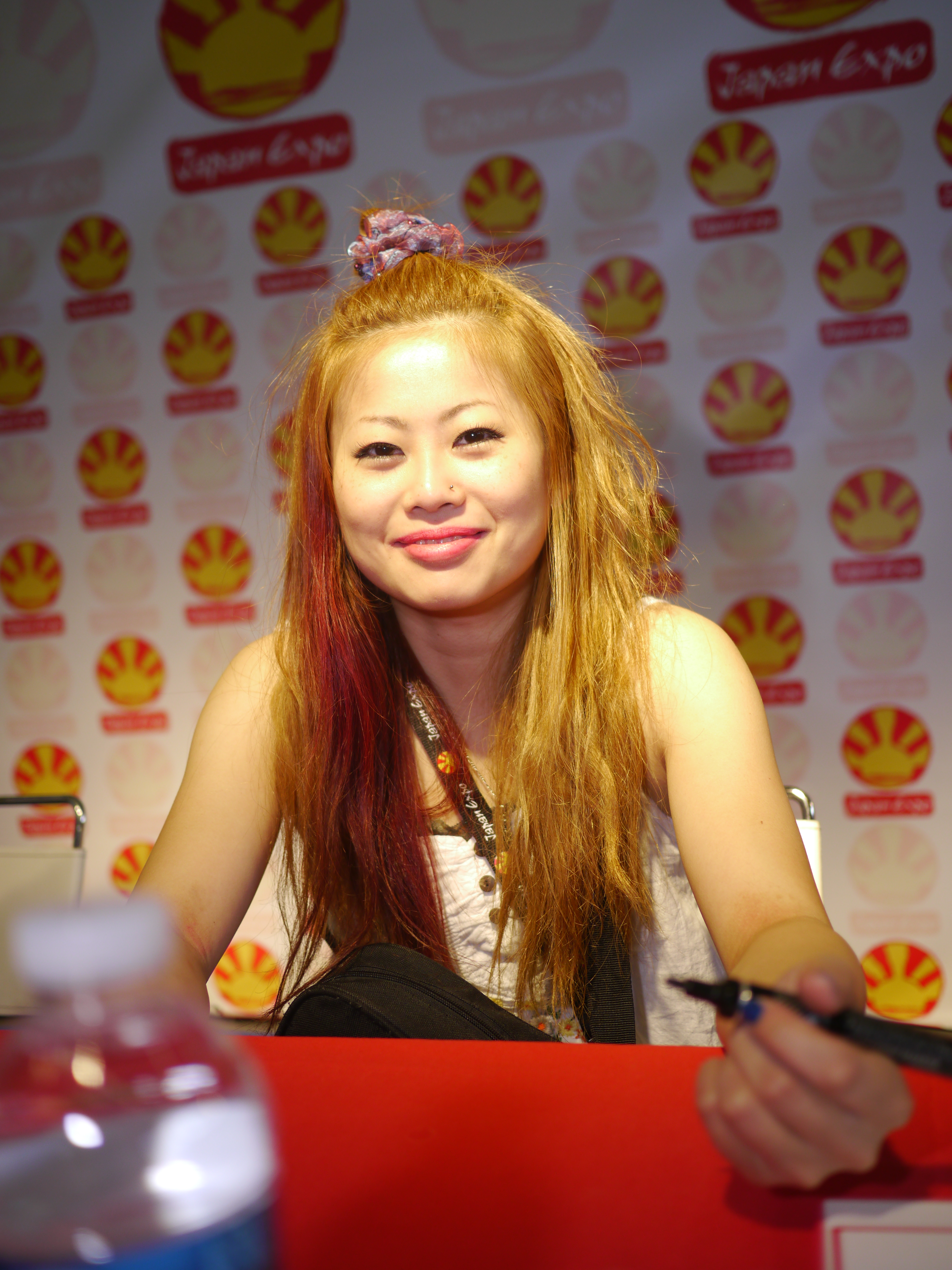
Bassist Azu joined the band in 2012.

Guitarist Yui and drummer Kanoko formed Cyntia in April 2011, after meeting on the set of a music video by Liv Moon. In the summer they recruited keyboardist Ayano and bassist Airi, who were followed by vocalist and former idol Saki in November after holding auditions. The name Cyntia is the English pronunciation of Cynthia, another name for the Greek goddess Artemis. Their debut single, "Run to the Future", was released in April 2012 on Bright Star Records, which was formed by fellow all-female metal band Aldious. Shortly after, Airi paused activities due to ill health and Azu from LAZYgunsBRISKY was chosen as support bassist. Airi officially left the group in June, but the band released their first album Endless World in September. Azu became a full member in November.

In January 2013, Cyntia was the backing band for South Korean pop group Kara's concert at the Tokyo Dome. The band released their major label debut, the album Lady Made, in March on Victor Entertainment. Cyntia was voted 2013's best new artist by readers of heavy metal magazine Burrn!. They performed at that year's Naon no Yaon female-only rock festival and then opened for American metal band Kamelot on their Japanese tour.

Their song "Senko Strings" was used as the fourth ending theme song to Saint Seiya Omega and released as a single in January 2014. Similarly, "Kiss Kiss Kiss" was used as the theme song of the 2014 Itazura na Kiss 2 ~Love in Okinawa television drama special, before being released as a single in January 2015. Its follow up a month later, "Akatsuki no Hana", was used as the second opening theme of the Yona of the Dawn anime adaptation. The album Woman was also released in February and featured a soft pop rock sound.

Drummer and co-founder Kanoko left the group in April 2015. Cyntia released their album Urban Night on December 14, 2016, via the VAA (Village Again Association) record label. The song "Bless of the Fire" features Aldious guitarist Toki. On December 26, 2017, Cyntia announced that they were suspending all activities indefinitely due to Yui's focal dystonia. Although the guitarist was planning to leave the band so someone new could take her place, the other members decided not to continue without her. An event on January 13, 2018, was their last.

Yui, Saki and Azu reunited as Cyntia for one night only at Club Citta on November 29, 2024, as part of the Queen of the Night two-man live with their former labelmates Aldious.

== Members ==
- Yui – guitar, backing vocals (2011–2018, 2024)
- Saki – vocals (2011–2018, 2024)
- Azu – bass, piano, backing vocals (2012–2018, 2024)

Former members

- Airi – bass (2011–2012)
- Kanoko – drums, percussion, backing vocals (2011–2015)
- Ayano – keyboards, piano, backing vocals (2011–2018)

== Discography ==
Cyntia discography
- Studio albums: 5
- Singles: 6

=== Albums ===
Title	Album details	Peak chart positions		
Title	Album details	JPN Oricon	JPN Billboard Hot	JPN Billboard Top
Endless World	Released: September 5, 2012; Label: Bright Star Records	22	—	33
Lady Made	Released: March 20, 2013; Label: Colourful Records	23	—	33
Limit Break	Released: February 12, 2014; Label: Colourful Records	9	—	10
Woman	Released: February 18, 2015; Label: Victor Entertainment	37	—	27
Urban Night	Released: December 14, 2016; Label: Village Again	33	73	37
"—" denotes a chart that did not exist.

=== Singles ===
Title	Year	Peak chart positions			Album
Title	Year	JPN Oricon	JPN Hot 100	JPN Top Singles	Album
"Run to the Future"	2012	42	—	43	Endless World
"Return to Myself ~ Shinai, Shinai, Natsu." (Return to Myself～しない、しない、ナツ。)	2013	36	46	31	Non-album single
"Senko Strings" (閃光ストリングス)	2014	13	32	9	Limit Break
"Shori no Hanataba o -Gonna Gonna Be Hot!-" (勝利の花束を-gonna gonna be hot!-")	2014	39	—	42	Woman
"Kiss Kiss Kiss"	2015	33	49	30	Woman
"Akatsuki no Hana" (暁の華)	2015	100	—	94	Woman
"—" denotes a recording that did not chart.
