= Kuroyume =

Japanese rock band

- Origin: Nagoya, Japan
- Genres: Punk rock; hard rock; alternative rock; gothic rock
- Years active: 1991–1999, 2009, 2010–2015, 2025–present
- Labels: Toshiba EMI, Avex Trax
- Members: Kiyoharu; Hitoki
- Past members: Shin; Eiki; Hiro
- Website: https://kuroyume.info/

Kuroyume (Japanese: 黒夢; lit. 'Black Dream') is a Japanese rock band formed in Nagoya in May 1991. They quickly achieved success with their 1994 major label debut album Mayoeru Yuritachi, which reached number three on the Oricon Albums Chart. Following the departure of guitarist Shin in 1995, vocalist Kiyoharu and bassist Hitoki remained the only official members. Each of their five subsequent albums reached the top seven on the chart, with Feminism (1995) and Fake Star (1996) both topping it. Their 1996 single "Pistol" earned them an MTV Video Music Award. Kuroyume had a definite influence on the visual kei scene, being credited as inspiration to many bands of the late 1990s and as one of the creators of Nagoya kei.

On January 29, 1999, Kuroyume indefinitely suspended all activities due to the severely strained relationship between Kiyoharu and Hitoki. They officially disbanded with a final live performance on January 29, 2009. However, the duo reunited only a year later in January 2010. They produced two further top-seven studio albums, before disbanding again in 2015. After ten years, Kuroyume reunited again in 2025.

== History ==
=== 1991–1993: Formation and independent years ===
Kuroyume was formed in 1991 by vocalist Kiyoharu, bassist Hitoki, drummer Eiki (all three former members of Garnet), and former Geracee guitarist Shin. Kiyoharu would later state that they started the band to become more popular with girls. After a year of performing live, Eiki left the band in June 1992 and they released "Chuuzetsu" the following month on Haunted House Records. The mini-album Ikiteita Chuzetsuji.... (remastered from a previously released January 1992 demo tape) followed that December. Its 4,000 copies sold out by pre-order.

Kuroyume's first full-length studio album, Nakigara o..., was released in June 1993 and clearly showed the group progressing in a more melodic direction by leaning further toward gothic rock and doing away completely with any semblance of metal music. The song "Shin'ai Naru Death Mask" from their first mini album had been re-recorded, and the band's first promotional music video was filmed for the song. Hiro, former drummer of The Star Club, joined the band in July 1993, but left only three months later. Kuroyume would utilize support drummers for the rest of their career. Hitoki would later say that after Eiki had left, they looked for someone who was "good and cool, but when we thought of 'Kuroyume', there was no one who would fit in as an official member."

During this era, Kuroyume are credited as creators of the Nagoya kei scene alongside Rouage and Laputa. According to Fanatic Crisis guitarist Shun, Kuroyume and Silver-Rose were the "big two" of Nagoya kei at the time.

=== 1994–1996: Success ===
Shortly after signing with Toshiba EMI in early 1994, Kuroyume released "For Dear" in February as their major label debut single. The album Mayoeru Yuritachi -Romance of Scarlet- was released in March 1994 and reached number three on the Oricon Albums Chart. Two promotional videos were filmed, one for the single and another for album track "Autism". In August 1994, the mini album Cruel and its lead single "Ice My Life" introduced a pop rock side. The band now dressed more conservatively, being reminiscent of 1980s New Romantic fashion and seeming to give off a more palatable image to mainstream buyers. According to Hitoki, he and Kiyoharu had planned from the beginning of the band to be "'[hard]core at first, pop later', and this is when it all came together." The bassist suggested each member was afraid of the change, but with the initial sales of Mayoeru Yuritachi around 30,000 copies, "I think Kiyoharu in particular was thinking about what we should do to sell more copies. He took the brunt of things, arguing with the manufacturer and with the office." Hitoki also shared that "There are bands that either go along with [what the record label says] or those that don't, depending on their basic values, but Kuroyume did not. I think we were able to change our concept, sound production, and visual aspects each time because we didn't get on board and take a million-seller kind of route."

In February 1995, guitarist Shin left the group and formed the band Vinyl with former D'erlanger vocalist Dizzy. From this point on, Kuroyume continued as a duo, while utilizing support musicians. Shin had been the main composer of music in the band. Hitoki later revealed that Cruel was initially planned to be recorded with Shin taking lead as the band self-produced, but the guitarist never left his bedroom. When they began working on the follow up, the band was unable to get in contact with Shin and it was suggested that they continue without him. The two albums following this rearrangement, May 1995's Feminism and May 1996's Fake Star ~I'm Just a Japanese Fake Rocker~, continued the more mainstream rock of Cruel, with the latter of the two having an edgier production and presenting a more fashionable image. Feminism was named one of the top albums from 1989–1998 in a 2004 issue of the music magazine Band Yarouze. In September 1996, Kuroyume won the MTV Japan International Viewer's Choice Award at the 1996 MTV Video Music Awards for the song "Pistol" from Fake Star. From this point onward, the band and particularly Kiyoharu were recognized on a national level.

=== 1997–1999, 2009: Breakup ===
1997 heralded another visual and musical transformation for Kuroyume when the album Drug Treatment released that June. April 1998's "Maria" became their highest-charting single when it reached number two on the Oricon chart. In May 1998, they released what would become their last studio album, Corkscrew. On January 29, 1999, Kuroyume announced the indefinite suspension of all activities. Hitoki had asked to quit the band about two years earlier, but Kiyoharu told him it was "impossible" as tickets for a tour had already been sold, so they decided to do their last tour. Hitoki later said that he wanted to quit music around 1999; by having achieved major success, "I began to see the dirty side of the music industry and the picture of the world. These aspects gradually built up inside me, and at that time, I could no longer enjoy music in its purest form." "I still think that if you really want to make only the kind of music you like, it is impossible to make it [on a major record label].", "When you are working and money is involved, there are always things that cannot be done solely from the artist's point of view, and there is the possibility of 'selling one's soul' in the process. At the time, I felt that I had had enough of that conflict, and I no longer wanted to do music itself. I also felt guilty about not being able to spend time with my family because I was on tour a lot."

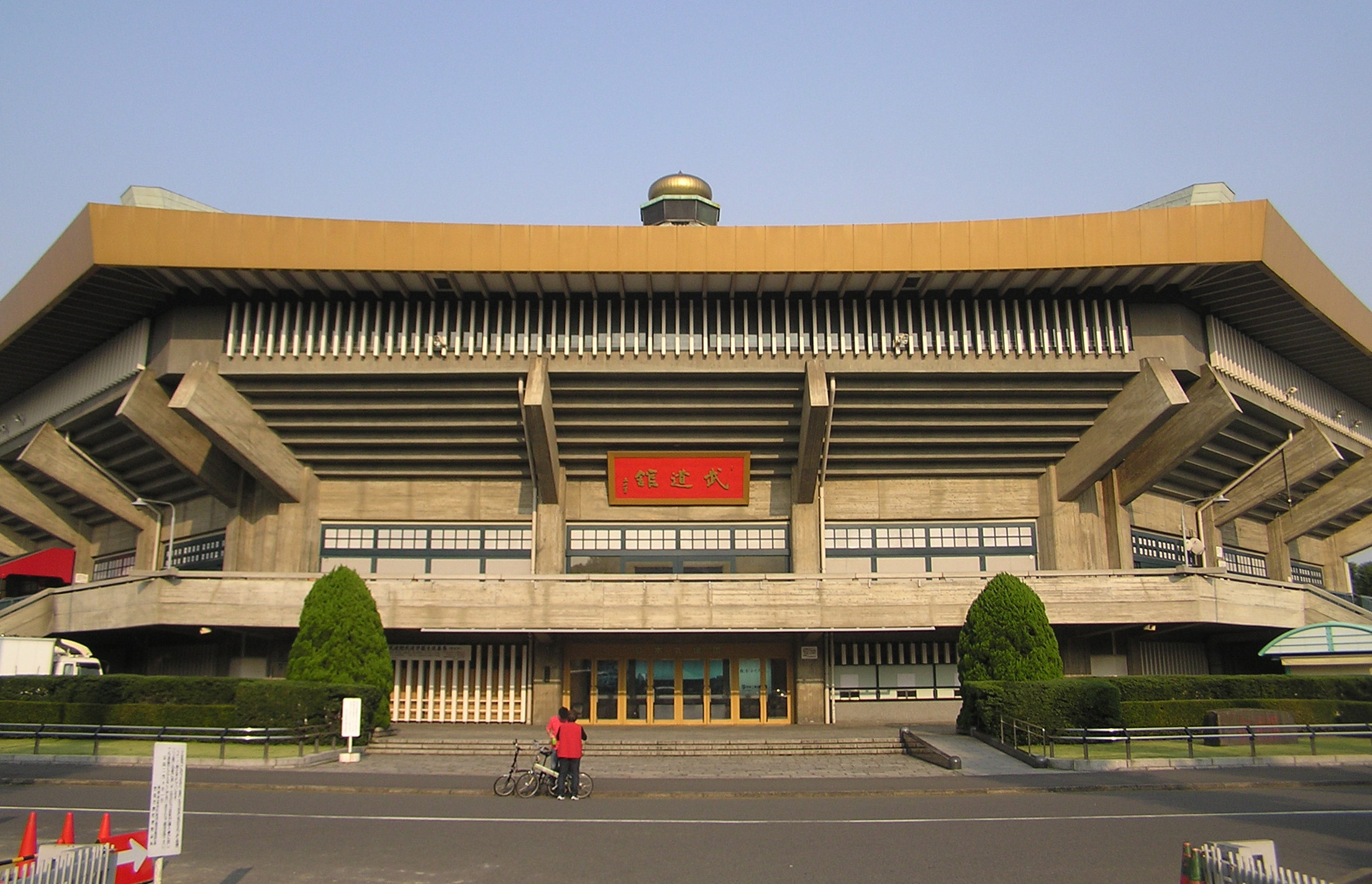
After a 10-year hiatus, Kuroyume performed their last concert at the Nippon Budokan in January 2009.

Kiyoharu later said the reason for the breakup was due to the severely strained relationship between Hitoki and himself. The two musicians were not on speaking terms and only communicated through their manager. The vocalist revealed that he purposely did not attend their rehearsals and, when the venue only had a single dressing room, he would enter the venue just before the show was to begin and leave as soon as it was over in order to avoid running into Hitoki. The two had also been recording material in the studio separately; with Kiyoharu claiming he would lower the bass on songs, Hitoki would then raise it, only for Kiyoharu to turn it down again. When asked what caused their relationship to get so bad, Kiyoharu said it was because Hitoki prioritized his family over the band. "I think it was the year after our major label debut, or maybe the year after that. He got married at the time when we were just getting started," said Kiyoharu, adding "One time, he refused to appear on Music Station, saying he couldn't because he had a family vacation planned that day (laughs). I was like, 'Huh? What are you thinking?' I had heard of such stories about foreign artists, but I thought, 'This is Japan!'" However, Kiyoharu also acknowledged that Hitoki might have been frustrated as the vocalist took the lead in producing their music, noting, "I think he was frustrated that he could not do what he wanted to do."

Kiyoharu went on to form the rock band Sads in 1999. They released numerous material until taking a hiatus in 2003, and returning in 2010. Hitoki formed a unit called Hitoki-PiranhaHeads in 2000 which had several line-ups and various name changes. In 2004, he joined Super Drop Babies with former Kuroyume guitarist Shin.

On Kiyoharu's 40th birthday, October 30, 2008, it was announced that Kuroyume would officially be disbanded with a concert on January 29, 2009. On that day, the band held their last concert at the Nippon Budokan in front of 13,500 people. Hitoki said he and Kiyoharu had not spoken at all in the ten years since Kuroyume had stopped activities.

=== 2010–2015, 2025–present: Reunions ===
On January 29, 2010, it was announced that Kuroyume would be revived and that they had begun recording a new album. It was initiated by the 2009 death of Masato Tōjō, former editor-in-chief of the music magazine Fool's Mate, who was a supporter of Kuroyume since their indie days. The band signed to the Avex Trax record label, the same label that housed Kiyoharu's solo work and Sads. Their first single since reforming, "Misery", was set to be released on January 29, 2011, but was pushed to February 9. Fuck the Border Line, a tribute album to Kuroyume, was released on February 9. It features covers of the band's songs by popular modern visual kei acts, such as Abingdon Boys School, Plastic Tree, The Gazette, Sid and Cascade. The duo then proceeded to release the singles "Alone" and "Heavenly" on May 25 and August 24, respectively. Following the relative success of these two singles, they released an album entitled Headache and Dub Reel Inch on November 2, 2011. "Alone" was selected by Capcom to be used in the advertisement campaign for Resident Evil: The Mercenaries 3D.

On March 26, 2014, Kuroyume released a single entitled "Reverb", which peaked at the 11th position on Oricon charts. It was selected by Koei Tecmo and was used for the advertising campaign of Samurai Warriors 4.

In September 2016, four trademark rights related to Kuroyume were auctioned off by the Tokyo Regional Taxation Bureau due to the rights holder's (Kiyoharu's Full Face Records) debt and failure to pay taxes. All four were sold to the same unknown winner; one sold for 681,000 yen, and the other three were sold for 200,000 yen. Kiyoharu's manager said the singer wanted to buy the rights back from the unknown winner.

As part of Kiyoharu's celebrations for his 30th anniversary in music, Kuroyume performed at the Tokyo Garden Theater on February 9, 2025. On May 10 of that year, they performed at the Gappa Rocks Ishikawa event, a fundraiser to support recovery from the 2024 Noto Peninsula earthquake, alongside acts such as Orange Range, Brahman, Sambomaster, Maximum the Hormone, Man with a Mission, and Gotch from Asian Kung-Fu Generation. Following Gappa Rocks, they held their own 10-date tour of Zepp venues between July 19 and September 20.

On July 15, 2026, Kuroyume released the albums Corkscrew 2026 and Drug TReatment 2026, both re-recordings of the original albums from 1997 and 1998, respectively. The albums' release was accompanied by new music videos for "Shounen" and "Needless"; this marked the first music video for the latter song.

== Members ==
Current members

- Kiyoharu (清春) – lead vocals (1991–1999, 2009, 2010–2015, 2025–present)
- Hitoki (人時) – bass, backing vocals (1991–1999, 2009, 2010–2015, 2025–present)

Former members

- Shin (臣) – guitar (1991–1995)
- Eiki (鋭葵) – drums (1991–1992)
- Hiro – drums (1993)

== Discography ==
=== Studio albums ===
- Nakigara o... (亡骸を・・・; June 11, 1993)
- Mayoeru Yuritachi -Romance of Scarlet- (迷える百合達〜Romance of Scarlet〜; March 9, 1994), Oricon Albums Chart Peak Position: #3
- Feminism (May 10, 1995) #1
- Fake Star ~I'm Just a Japanese Fake Rocker~ (May 29, 1996) #1
- Drug TReatment (June 27, 1997) #2
- Corkscrew (May 27, 1998) #2
- Headache and Dub Reel Inch (November 2, 2011) #2
- Kuro to Kage (黒と影; January 29, 2014) #7

=== Mini-albums ===
- Ikiteita Chuzetsuji.... (生きていた中絶児・・・・; December 25, 1992)
- Cruel (August 31, 1994) #7

=== Self-cover albums ===
- Corkscrew 2026 (July 15, 2026)
- Drug TReatment 2026 (July 15, 2026)

=== Singles ===
- "Chuuzetsu" (中絶; July 20, 1992)
- "For Dear" (February 9, 1994), Oricon Singles Chart Peak Position: #18
- "Ice My Life" (July 20, 1994) #10
- "Yasashii Higeki" (優しい悲劇; March 8, 1995) #10
- "Miss Moonlight" (April 26, 1995) #12
- "Beams" (October 13, 1995) #6
- "See You" (February 21, 1996) #5
- "Pistol" (ピストル; April 17, 1996) #4
- "Like @ Angel" (November 18, 1996) #5
- "Nite & Day" (April 10, 1997) #3
- "Spray" (June 4, 1997) #5
- "Shounen" (少年; November 19, 1997) #3
- "Maria" (April 8, 1998) #2
- "Misery" (ミザリー; February 9, 2011) #6
- "Alone" (アロン; May 25, 2011) #8
- "Heavenly" (August 24, 2011) #14
- "Kingdom" (September 6, 2013)
- "Guernika" (ゲルニカ; December 11, 2013) #15
- "I Hate Your Popstar Life" (December 11, 2013) #16
- "Reverb" (March 26, 2014) #11
- "Day 1" (January 5, 2015)

=== Live albums ===
- 1997.10.31 Live at Shinjuku Loft (January 16, 1998) #7
- Kuroyume "the End" -Corkscrew a Go Go! Final- 090129 Nippon Budokan (March 18, 2009) #23
- XXXX The Fake Star (May 4, 2011)

=== Compilation albums ===
- EMI 1994–1998 Best or Worst (February 17, 1999) #2
- Kuroyume Complete Rare Tracks 1991–1993 -Indies Zenkyokushu- (KUROYUME COMPLETE RARE TRACKS 1991-1993〜インディーズ全曲集〜; June 10, 2000)
- Kuroyume Singles (March 27, 2002) #44
- Kuroyume Complete Singles (September 29, 2003)
- Kuroyume Box (April 28, 2004)

=== Demo tapes ===
- "Kuroyume" (黒夢; August 29, 1991)
- "Ikiteita Chuzetsuji" (生きていた中絶児; January 25, 1992)

=== Tribute albums ===
- Fuck the Border Line (February 9, 2011)
- Kuroyume Respect Album: Revision Underwear (March 25, 2015)

=== Home videos ===
- Under.... (October 31, 1992)
- Neo Under (September 5, 1993)
- Deep Under (December 20, 1993)
- Tanmei no Yuritachi (短命の百合達; July 6, 1994)
- Theater of Cruel (September 28, 1994)
- Tour Feminism Part 1 (September 27, 1995)
- Pictures (December 13, 1995)
- Fake Star's Circuit 1996: Boys Only (October 4, 1996)
- 1996 Fake Star's Circuit: Yokohama Arena (November 18, 1996)
- 1996 Fake Star's Circuit: Tour Document (January 29, 1997)
- Pictures 2 (October 22, 1997)
- 1997.10.31 Live at Shinjuku Loft (January 16, 1998, reissued on October 29, 2003)
- Live or Die -Corkscrew a Go Go- (March 31, 1999)
- DVD Pictures Vol. 1 (October 18, 2000)
- DVD Pictures Vol. 2 (October 18, 2000)
- Complete Single Clips (April 13, 2005)
- All Pictures (January 28, 2009)
- The End -Corkscrew a Go Go! Final- 090129 Nippon Budokan (March 25, 2009)
- XXXX Fuck the Fake Star: The Newest Feather (July 20, 2011)
- Headache and Dub Reel Inch 2012.1.13 Live at Nippon Budokan (May 2, 2012)
- Kuroyume 1.14 (June 13, 2012)
- Kuro to Kage 2014.1.29 Live at Nippon Budokan (June 11, 2014)
- Kuroyume Live & Document DVD Last Long Tour 2014-2015 (January 7, 2021)
