= Kiyoharu =

Japanese musician and singer-songwriter (born 1968)

- Born: Kiyoharu Mori; 30 October 1968 (age 57)
- Origin: Gifu, Japan
- Genres: Alternative rock; hard rock; punk rock; post-punk; glam rock; surf rock
- Occupations: Musician, singer-songwriter
- Instruments: Vocals, guitar
- Years active: 1986–present
- Labels: Universal Japan; Tokyo Lips Pro; Bouncy; Rock Chipper; Avex Trax; Warner Music Japan; Triad/Nippon Columbia; Pony Canyon; Yamaha
- Formerly of: Kuroyume; Sads
- Website: kiyoharu.tokyo

Kiyoharu Mori (Japanese: 森 清治, Hepburn: Mori Kiyoharu; born 30 October 1968), better known by his stage name Kiyoharu (清春), is a Japanese musician and singer-songwriter, known as frontman of the rock bands Kuroyume and Sads. In 2003, he began a solo career, performing as both singer and guitarist.

== Career ==
=== Kuroyume and Sads ===
Kiyoharu's musical career began in 1986 as a member of the independent band Double Bed, which folded after a few months of activity. He then formed Sus4 in 1987, before later joining Garnet. After the disbandment of Garnet in 1991, Kiyoharu, as well as former Garnet bassist, Hitoki, formed Kuroyume. Kuroyume began in the beginning days of the visual kei movement. They progressed from a typical dark image and sound, to a heavy sound influenced by punk rock. The band ended up a duo with Kiyoharu and Hitoki the only official members. Due to the severely strained relationship between the two, Kuroyume ended all activities in January 1999.

Kiyoharu wasted no time and formed the band Sads in 1999. To support their 2000 album Babylon, the band held a national tour called Welcome to My Babylon. However, Kiyoharu made mistakes in the budgeting for its elaborate stage production, and ended up incurring a debt of 50 million yen. The band eventually formed their own record label, Fullface Records, in 2001. The label would sign its first act outside of Sads, Merry, for their first album Gendai Stoic. Sads' drummer, Eiji Mitsuzono announced his departure from the band in 2003, leaving the band on indefinite hiatus.

=== Solo career ===
After the pause in Sads' activities in 2003, Kiyoharu began releasing solo work. His debut album, Poetry, was released in 2004, showcasing not only his vocal skills, but his talent as a guitarist as well. He has collaborated with many artists, including Hyde (L'Arc-en-Ciel), Takanori Nishikawa, Kirito (Pierrot), Atsushi Sakurai (Buck-Tick), Gara (Merry), Sugizo (Luna Sea) etc.

In 2006, Kiyoharu released two singles, as well as a new album, Vinnybeach -Kakuu no Kaigan-, followed by two long, promotional tours. The following single, "Slow", was featured as the opening song for the anime series The Wallflower.

He released another studio album, Forever Love, in 2007. It is dedicated to his father, who died. Kiyoharu released "Aibu" in early 2008, and in May the next single, "Samidare", was released.

In 2008, he released a set of twin albums entitled Rhythmless & Perspective light~saw the light & shade and Rhythmless & Perspective shade~saw the light & shade. Each album contained 7 tracks of self-covers from his solo work and his work with Sads. The following year, he released the album Medley, a collection of Kuroyume covers.

On July 11, 2012, he released Under the Sun.

In September 2016, four trademark rights related to Kuroyume were auctioned off by the Tokyo Regional Taxation Bureau due to Kiyoharu's Full Face Records' debt and failure to pay taxes. All four were sold to the same unknown winner; one sold for 681,000 yen, and the other three were sold for 200,000 yen. Kiyoharu's manager said the singer wanted to buy the rights back from the unknown winner.

Kiyoharu covered "Sadistic Emotion" by D'erlanger for 2017's D'erlanger Tribute Album ~Stairway to Heaven~. In 2017, he participated in Sugizo's solo studio album, Oneness M, on the track "Voice".

Kiyoharu released his tenth studio album, Japanese Menu/Distortion 10, on March 25, 2020.

== Discography ==
Studio albums
Poetry (7 April 2004)
Mellow (30 March 2005)
Kannou Boogie (官能ブギー; 7 December 2005)
Vinnybeach: Kakū no Kaigan (VINNYBEACH 〜架空の海岸〜; 12 July 2006)
Forever Love (14 November 2007)
Light: Saw the Light & Shade (10 September 2008, acoustic album)
Shade: Saw the Light & Shade (10 September 2008, acoustic album)
Madrigal of Decadence (29 July 2009)
Under the Sun (7 November 2012)
Soloist (30 March 2016)
Elegy (エレジー; 13 December 2017, acoustic album)
Yoru, Carmen no Shishuu (夜、カルメンの詩集; 28 February 2018)
Japanese Menu/Distortion 10 (25 March 2020)
Eternal (20 March 2024)
Singles
"Emily" (9 February 2004)
"Last Song: Saigo no Shi " (LAST SONG-最後の詞-; 16 February 2005)
"Horizon" (16 March 2005)
"Layra" (20 July 2005)
"Bask in Art" (9 November 2005)
"Wednesday" (30 November 2005)
"Seiza no Yoru/Cyclamen no Kahori" (星座の夜/シクラメンのかほり; 8 March 2006)
"Kimi no Koto ga" (君の事が; 17 May 2006)
"Slow" (22 November 2006)
"Carnation" (カーネーション; 13 December 2006)
"Tattoo" (22 August 2007)
"Rinne" (輪廻; 19 September 2007)
"Melodies" (31 October 2007)
"Aibu" (愛撫; 23 January 2008)
"Samidare" (五月雨; 14 May 2008)
"Loved" (29 October 2008)
"Kurutta Kajitsu" (狂った果実; 13 May 2009)
"Darlene" (25 June 2009)
"Law's" (13 January 2010)
"Ryusei/The Sun" (流星/the sun; 23 May 2012)
"Namida ga Afureru/Sari" (涙が溢れる/sari; 22 August 2012)
"Yoru o, Omou" (夜を、想う; 9 February 2017)
"Aka no Eien/Tsumihoroboshi Nobara" (赤の永遠/罪滅ぼし野ばら; 9 February 2018)
"Wanderer" (3 May 2018)
"Gaia" (ガイア; 16 October 2021)
Digital singles
"Kanashimi Johnny" (19 June 2019)
"Regret" (リグレット; 29 January 2022)
"L" (6 June 2022)
Other albums
Singles (24 December 2008, compilation album)
Medley (28 January 2009, self-cover album)
Covers (4 September 2019, cover album)
Other appearances
Tribute to Auto-Mod - Flower in the Dark (15 June 1995)
Hide Tribute Spirits (1 May 1999)
Parade -Respective Tracks of Buck-Tick- (21 December 2005)
Tsuchiya Kohey's 25th Celebration "Get Stoned" (21 January 2009)
Dead End Tribute -Song of Lunatics- (4 September 2013)
Home videos
Aurora (オーロラ; 30 October 2003)
Kiyoharu 1st Solo Live "Daisan no Tobira" 2003.12.5 Shibuya Kōkaidō (kiyoharu 1st solo live「第三の扉」2003.12.5 渋谷公会堂; 7 April 2004)
Kagefumi (影踏み; 15 September 2004)
Tenshi no Uta (天使の詩; 20 July 2005)
Mellow (31 August 2005)
'05–06 New Year Countdown "Groover" ('05-06 NEW YEAR COUNTDOWN『GROOVER』; February 2006)
Tenshi no Uta '06 "Travel" (天使の詩 '06「travel」; 24 January 2007)
Vinny Beach Final (February 2007)
Clips (27 August 2008)
Kiyoharu 5.21 Performance at Kudan Kaikan Rhythmless & Perspective Live "Light and Shade" (清春 5.21 LIVE AT 九段会館RHYTHMLESS & PERSPECTIVE LIVE『光と影』; 10 September 2008)
Forever Love (September 2008)
The 40th Birthday (24 December 2008)
15 (August 2009)
Play of Medley (26 August 2009)
Lounge Fuyutsubaki (LOUNGE 冬椿; 30 October 2009)
090731 Liquid Room (30 October 2009)
The 41st Birthday (30 December 2009)
16 (September 2010)
17 (November 2011)
Clips II (20 March 2013)
18 (January 2014)
The 45th Birthday (12 March 2014)
19 (16 December 2014)
Kiyoharu 50th Birthday (24 July 2019)
Covers Music Clips (18 September 2019)
The Birthday Debut 25th Anniversary (6 March 2020)
Kūhaku no Sekai (空白ノ世界; July 2023)

== Bibliography ==
Kiyoharu 35X (15 issues between 15 December 2003 and 13 July 2006)
Yūutsu to Iu na no Yume (憂鬱という名の夢; December 2004)
Alien Masked Creature Kiyoharu Nude Box (7 April 2005)
Kiyoharu 40X (4 issues between 7 November 2008 and 3 July 2009)
Kiyoharu 15th Anniversary Memorial Book 3/8 "Three-eighths" (15 April 2009)
Kiyoharu Four My Life (28 May 2011)
Mardi Gras (31 August 2013)
Mardi Gras Photos (29 August 2014)
The Greatest Session Fifty Fifty (5 November 2019)
Kiyoharu (30 October 2020)
