= LXXXVIII Corps =

LXXXVIII Corps or 88th Corps may refer to:

- LXXXVIII Army Corps, Wehrmacht, Germany
- 88th (Fleshers) Lanarkshire Rifle Volunteer Corps, United Kingdom

== See also ==
- List of military corps by number
- 88th Brigade (disambiguation)
- 88th Division (disambiguation)
- 88th Regiment (disambiguation)
- 88th (disambiguation)
