= 88th Infantry =

88th Infantry may refer to:

- 88th Infantry Division (disambiguation)
- 88th Infantry Brigade (disambiguation)
- 88th Infantry Regiment (disambiguation)

== See also ==
- 88th (disambiguation)
