= List of Recently, My Sister is Unusual episodes =

First volume DVD cover, showing Mitsuki Kanzaki

Recently, My Sister Is Unusual (最近、妹のようすがちょっとおかしいんだが) is an anime television series written by Hideyuki Kurata and directed by Hiroyuki Hata. The story follows Mitsuki Kanzaki who comes to have a stepbrother named Yūya. One day Mitsuki is possessed by an angel who calls herself Hiyori who in life had deep feelings towards Yūya. She places a chastity belt on Mitsuki and tells her in order for her to cross over into heaven her final wish to be closer to Yūya must be fulfilled or else both of them will die and go to hell. Mitsuki reluctantly agrees and soon finds herself torn by her feelings for Yūya.

The anime series premiered on Tokyo MX and Sun TV on January 4, 2014, and twelve episodes were aired in total. An OVA was also created for the series that consisted of two short stories in one episode. In May, 2014 a live action film directed by Yuki Aoyama was also made that follows the storyline of the anime with a different ending. When the series first aired it caused a controversy in Japan where a decency investigation was launched. This resulted in censorship of some of the images, and a later time slot for the series. In addition to airing in Japan, the series has been streamed by Crunchyroll, and was licensed by Discotek Media. The series was first released in Japan on DVD, and then later on Blu-ray. The Blu-ray release uses an alternate art cover for the container, and has the episodes uncensored. Outside Japan, the series was released on DVD in North America by Discotek Media on July 28, 2015.

== Anime ==
No.	Title	Original release date
1	"Mitsuki SOS"; Transliteration: "Mitsuki SOS" (Japanese: 美月SOS)	January 4, 2014
Hiyori possessing Mitsuki (right) with the real Mitsuki outside her body (left) Yūya Kanzaki finds himself having a stepsister named Mitsuki. At first she is cold to him, addressing her stepbrother as "you" or "him," but suddenly one day Mitsuki collapses, which causes Yūya to panic. When Mitsuki awakens in the hospital she passionately embraces Yūya calling him her "big brother" before changing moods again, literally kicking him out of her hospital room. Later on after a rest at home, she awakens to find a chastity belt on her. Mitsuki then meets Hiyori who calls herself an angel, before she can ask more she leaps into Mitsuki's body possessing her. The possession causes the real Mitsuki who is now transparent to float outside of her body, Hiyori tells Mitsuki not to worry though as she is not dead. She then proceeds to masturbate while in Mitsuki's body causing the real Mitsuki to jump back into her own body driving Hiyori out. Dismayed, Hiyori then pleasures her while talking about her big brother (Yūya) resulting in Mitsuki having an orgasm that causes a heart located on the chastity belt to fill up a little. Upset that someone might see her chastity belt she demands Hiyori tell her how to take it off. Hiyori tells of a button that just releases the crotch bit which Mitsuki proceeds to press. While explaining about the belt, she is interrupted by Mitsuki who has to use the bathroom. While there the chastity belt clamps back on, Hiyori explains that it only stays off for three minutes before going back on and she must wait an hour before pressing it again. Hiyori explains that she tried to finish what she was going to say but got interrupted. Mitsuki suffers for an hour in the bathroom worrying both her aunt and Yūya before having the opportunity to go again with great relief.
2	"Shining Amidst the Storm"; Transliteration: "Arashi no Naka de Kagayaite" (Japanese: 嵐の中で輝いて)	January 11, 2014
The episode begins with Mitsuki asking Hiyori who she is and asking why she can't cross over. She responds by taking Mitsuki through time and space to steps leading to a big golden gate. Once there she explains that in life she loved Yūya but died before she could confess her feelings. She tells Mitsuki that in order for her to cross over she wants to do "lovey dovey" things with him. Each time this happens (from Hiyori possessing her or Mitsuki's own actions) the heart on the chastity belt fills up a little. Each time the heart is filled a step is added that leads closer to the golden gate, once full the gate will open allowing Hiyori to cross over. After waking up and thinking it was all a dream, she is then disappointed to find otherwise and then heads off to school. While at school Mitsuki lets Hiyori possess her for gym class and as a result she does really well. When Hiyori tells her that she is doing this to try and draw attention from Yūya Mitsuki protests. Hiyori continues to say that if after a while Mitsuki does nothing the heart on her belt will drain completely causing both of them to die and go to hell. While at school Mitsuki has the sudden urge to use the restroom. Wrongly thinking that she is sick Yūya takes her to the nurse which ultimately causes Mitsuki to wet herself in front of him. Crying, and embarrassed Mitsuki doesn't know how she can face him but is cheered up by Hiyori. At the same time Yūya has an accident at the grocery store which causes him to take a bath at home with the door's lock broken. After his bath Mitsuki accidentally sees him naked and then goes to take her own bath. When she tries to get out she discovers that the door is broken, Yūya hears this and explains the door can only be opened from the outside. Yūya says to her that he will open a crack to it so she will be able to get out. Hiyori takes the opportunity and possess Mitsuki pulling him in there with her which shuts the door and traps them both inside the bathroom.
3	"Heavy-Hanging Fruit"; Transliteration: "Tawawana Kaijitsu" (Japanese: たわわな果実)	January 18, 2014
With the two locked in the bathroom, Yūya gives Mitsuki his shirt and the two share bits of their past with each other. The result of the talking causes a reaction in Mitsuki that fills up the heart a little. Yūya calls out for help and is answered by Yukina who comes to let them out. Yukina introduces herself to Mitsuki as Yūya's childhood friend causing her to become upset while thinking about it. Later on, Hiyori furious that Yukina is making moves on Yūya warns Mitsuki about it telling her that relationship stress and jealously make the heart's contents on the belt drop faster. Hiyori possesses her again and flirts with Yūya while trying to humiliate Yukina, the result of which has little effect. Determined, she gets Yūya to admit that he likes both large and small breasts to Misuki's embarrassment. The result also causes the heart on the chastity belt to recover and fill more. The next day, an accidental spill causes Yūya to see Misuki's panties. After putting her panties in the wash, she refuses to walk to school with Yūya and Yukina. Hiyori suggests that it is jealousy, something Mitsuki blushes to deny. Hiyori also notices that Yukina is looking directly at her something that she dismisses as not possible. While at school Yūya is embarrassed when thinking of Mitsuki's panties he had accidentally seen earlier. Meanwhile, Mitsuki acknowledges that she forgot to put her panties back on before she came to school after washing them. During lunch, she is invited by Ayaka to join her but declines noticing how windy it is. Yukina hints to her that she knows her problem and helps her out by trying to bring her back inside. Things go okay until a gust of wind exposes her butt to Yūya causing him to fall back out of shock and hit his head. The episode ends with Mitsuki finding a new pair of panties on her desk that she receives from an unknown person. Yūya meanwhile is in the nurses office with a headache and memory loss of what happened with Mitsuki.
4	"Heartcatch Hiyori-chan"; Transliteration: "Hātokyatchi Hiyori-chan" (Japanese: ハートキャッチ日和ちゃん)	January 25, 2014
While lying in bed thinking of Yūya Hiyori tells Mitsuki to respond more to him and says that she could be the ideal little sister, something she takes as a challenge. The next day, Hiyori possesses her and makes breakfast for Yūya who is surprised. The real Mitsuki watches all of this and dismisses it as "sucking up", and has Hiyori reassures her that she won't do excessive body contact or seduction on him. She continues to watch as Hiyori acts very sister-like to Yūya while in her body to the point of causing him to smile. Realizing that he had never smiled to her before the real Mitsuki begins to go deep into thought. Her thoughts are interrupted by Yukina jokingly saying that it looks like the two are on a date. Neko walks by where the real Mitsuki is floating saying "you shouldn't stay separated for too long" causing confusion if she can see her. Later on Hiyori who is still possessing Mitsuki goes to a drainage ditch with Yūya to skip rocks. The real Mitsuki floats nearby thinking of what being real siblings means. While skipping rocks, Yūya talks about his past and of a girl he had as a friend who called him "big brother". Upon hearing this, Hiyori as Mitsuki jumps into his arms saying it was her and happy that he remembered. When the real Mitsuki tries to intervene she discovers she can't go back into her own body. Later that night when she tells her she can't go back into her body it makes Hiyori want to take advantage of the situation. Hiyori as Mitsuki insists she sleep in Yūya's room with him because she is scared of the thunder and later crawls into bed with him. Hiyori then says through Mitsuki that she will be the perfect little sister to him, Yūya responds by saying that she should just be herself. The result of him saying that, causes the real Mitsuki who is floating nearby to feel touched and Hiyori to leave her body. Hiyori then literally kicks Mitsuki back into her body, in embarrassment of everything that happened Mitsuki then kicks Yūya out of his own room. The next day Mitsuki tells Yūya she is going to be as she has always been like he said.
5	"Naughty Body Snatcher"; Transliteration: "Ikenai Bodi Sunatchā" (Japanese: いけないボディ・スナッチャー)	February 4, 2014
Mitsuki, and Yūya are invited to a fitness pool center by Ayaka. Once there she runs into Yukina, also present are Shōtarō and Moa. Mitsuki who is wearing a bathing suit refuses to go into the water out of embarrassment that her belt might be seen. While watching everyone have fun, Neko introduces herself to Mitsuki and tells her she accompanied them there as her father owns the place. She also tells that her father wanted more opinions from people and allowed them to stay for free if they complied. Mitsuki thinks of Yūya while watching him have fun and reacts after seeing how his friend Shōtarō is with his sister Moa. Yūya accidentally hits his head against Yukina's causing him to fall in. Upon seeing this Mitsuki jumps in to help him but it is not needed as he turns out to be okay. Mitsuki's leg cramps up however, and Yūya carries her out and away someplace to sit. Unknowingly to both of them Mitsuki's bathing suit had fallen off. Yūya puts her down and is shocked to discover her wearing the belt, to make things worse some people come along to walk by. Yūya apologizes to Misuki and then proceeds to kiss her hiding the belt from view and making the people walking by think they are a couple making out. Yūya then takes his swimsuit off causing Mitsuki to scream in embarrassment and the heart on the belt to fill up more. It is shown afterwards that Yūya gave her his swimsuit that he wore two pairs of swimwear for some reason. The next day, Yūya thinks of why Mitsuki could be wearing the belt, while unconsciously rubbing Mitsuki's panties on his face that had been given back to him. Mitsuki meanwhile who stayed home from school sick, hits her breaking point and is ready to cut off the belt with scissors when she collapses. Hiyori seeing that the belt on her is not looking good possesses Mitsuki. She then goes on top of Yūya when he comes to check to see if Mitsuki is alright after getting home from school. As Hiyori asks Yūya to do her she comes out of Mitsuki and reveals herself to him, in response he confusingly asks who she is.
6	"Oh! A Ghost"; Transliteration: "Ō! Yūrei Ningen" (Japanese: おお! 幽霊人間)	February 11, 2014
Hiyori collapses onto Yūya revealing Mitsuki who calls him an idiot and asks what he is doing. Before he can ask her more about it she collapses again saying it wasn't her. Mitsuki embraces Yūya while calling out to her mother when he goes to help her out, he then puts her into bed to rest from being sick. The next morning, Hiyori is relieved that Mitsuki is okay however she sees that she still is not fully recovered. Yūya meanwhile, asks Yukina for advice but doesn't use Mitsuki's name. He gets some helpful advice from her but comes to the wrong conclusion about why she is wearing the "scary panties" (referring to her belt). While walking home from school, he gets the chance to talk to her again. Yukina asks Yūya why he thinks she changed from being a tomboy in the past to how she is now but is interrupted before she can get an answer from him. When he gets home Mitsuki, who is possessed by Hiyori while the real one is sleeping says to Yūya that there is something she needs to tell him. Yūya confusingly thinks on what it could be that Mitsuki wants to tell him and is unsure how to react. While taking a bath, Hiyori (possessing Mitsuki) is hesitant but determined to have sex with Yūya thinking that at the rate things are going with Mitsuki she will never get to heaven. She then goes into Yūya's room half naked to his embarrassment, but doesn't know how to bring up the topic and stalls long enough for the real Mitsuki to wake up and protest against what Hiyori is doing. Hiyori puts Mitsuki back into her own body out of embarrassment just as Yūya tells Mitsuki he is okay with her liking girls. He is worried about the belt though and again misunderstands why he sees her with Hiyori, making Mitsuki wonder how he came up with such a crazy conclusion. Yūya tells her he is okay with her wearing the belt but wish she would be more careful. Mitsuki cheers up from his overall kind words, but kicks him out when he motions to her being half naked. The episode ends with Yūya reading a thankful note from Mitsuki saying she is going back to school.
7	"Fumbling Around? Club Activities"; Transliteration: "Tesaguri? Bukatsu Mono" (Japanese: てさぐり? 部活もの)	February 18, 2014
While sitting and having lunch, Ayaka convinces Mitsuki to look at some school clubs to join. Hiyori's objects as she wants flirt time with Yūya, but concedes to her just looking and not joining. Mitsuki starts with the tennis club, and has Hiyori possess her out of exhaustion. Hiyori does great astonishing the team's captain. Hiyori pops back out and the captain begs Mitsuki to join saying they could make it to Wimbledon but she refuses. A similar thing occurs when she tries out soccer club, Hiyori possesses Mitsuki again and does well. Hiyori gets excited when the team captain offers to go for the world cup. Both are overwhelmed though by all the forms involved which causes Mitsuki in her own body to decline. Mitsuki tries out other clubs with no interest until she gets to the kendo club whereupon seeing Yukina, Hiyori gets interested. With Yūya watching them, the two have a match with Hiyori possessing Mitsuki, however the men smells too much for her to stand. Hiyori has Mitsuki go back into her body just as Yukina knocks her out, concerned Yūya runs to her side to find out she is alright. The next one that draws Mitsuki in is the theater club where Neko is rehearsing a play she wrote the scenario for. The play involves Yūya who must choose between his girlfriend played by Neko, or his step-sister played by Moa. In the end he chooses his girlfriend who asks to marry him, but at the last minute she backs out saying he should go with the person who he is truly in love with. A new bride comes on stage who isn't Moa but Mitsuki who took her role and says to Yūya "Don't fawn over someone who isn't your little sister". Moa who is tied up runs back up on stage to try to reclaim her role but trips on Mitsuki causing the back of her dress to rip, exposing her backside. After screaming she wakes up relieved it was a dream only to find that she is still dreaming. After another False awakening and awake for real now, Mitsuki gets a text from Ayaka telling her not to worry about what happened at school which causes a shocked look on her face.
8	"Alone Together at the Aquarium"; Transliteration: "Futarikiri no Suizokukan" (Japanese: 二人きりの水族館)	February 25, 2014
While at school, Yūya receives two tickets to the aquarium from Neko. Mitsuki arrives home from school first and is shocked to discover a lewd magazine that results in her having a nightmare. When Yūya comes to retrieve his friend's magazine Mitsuki throws it at him upset that he has such a thing not knowing it isn't his. Yūya changes the subject by offering the tickets he had received earlier to her which makes both Hiyori and Mitsuki excited. Hiyori then possesses Mitsuki who blurts out to his surprise how happy she is to go with him. At the aquarium Hiyori (as Mitsuki) is overjoyed at the surroundings which makes Yūya happy. While looking at an ocean sunfish Mitsuki who is floating nearby asks Hiyori why they went with him comparing it to a date. Mitsuki jumps back into her body out of embarrassment, but upon thinking of being on a date with Yūya gets aroused and confused. The result makes her belt feel hot filling up the heart more, and causes Hiyori to feel strange. Later on Mitsuki and Yūya share their pasts with each other. Mitsuki tells him she now feels strange to have someone be there when she gets home as her mother left her alone when she went to work. She then asks him if he had a friend named Hiyori when he was little but Yūya tells her he never heard that name before. Hiyori tells Mitsuki that she got the name Hiyori from a book and can't remember her real name. While dipping their legs in a tank full of doctor fish, Mitsuki has a weird feeling but Yūya insists holding her legs in the tank thinking she will be fine. The result of the fish sucking, and her thinking of him results in another orgasm that fills up the heart more. Mitsuki gets upset with Yūya who didn't know that the fish bothered her, but after he apologizes she feels happy. Yūya goes on ahead while they are walking back home turning on all the lights in the house to welcome her back. While in bed Hiyori then tells Mitsuki that she thinks their synchronization ratio went up saying their hearts are connected. Hiyori also goes to say she will pretend she doesn't notice Mitsuki falling for him too making her embarrassed and causing her to deny it.
9	"Battle Heater & Iron Chef"; Transliteration: "Batoruhītā & ryōri no tetsujin" (Japanese: バトルヒーター＆料理の鉄人)	March 3, 2014
Nanami brings a kotatsu over to the house before leaving for work. Mitsuki then sees it and uses it while studying math but falls asleep followed by Hiyori. When Yūya sees Hiyori sleeping with Mitsuki he assumes she is a friend. After noticing her math book he sees that she has the wrong answers, and corrects them for her under the kotatsu before falling asleep as well. Mitsuki awakens to find Yūya holding her while sleeping causing her to unsuccessfully try to awaken him with a slap. She dismisses it as him being an airhead, but is touched when she finds the corrected math work he did. When Yūya wakes up Mitsuki blushes while saying thank you, but is confused when he asks where her friend went. The next day Mitsuki makes a bento for Yūya making Hiyori notice that she is acting differently. Hiyori compares it to a newlywed which Mitsuki dismisses as synchronized feelings with her. Mitsuki notices Yūya's bag shortly after but is reluctant about looking inside, Hiyori possesses her though and takes a look. Hiyori decides to pop back out of Mitsuki's body after to her surprise she notices a second bento. Mitsuki discovers the bento she made before is full while the other one is empty causing her to be upset and swear never to make lunch for him again. Yukina comes over to visit with a bento for Yūya, but sees Mitsuki is upset and offers to cook dinner with her. When Mitsuki starts to refuse Hiyori possesses her and accepts later telling Mitsuki that the bento is most likely a misunderstanding. Yūya goes for a bath before dinner and Mitsuki later jumps back into her body. Yukina tells her that Yūya has been happy receiving the meals Mitsuki makes for him, and that she will stop making bento for him while apologizing to her. Yukina accidentally spills dressing on Mitsuki causing her to go for a bath. By chance Yūya exits and sees her causing her to slap him again while raising the heart on the belt. Later Yūya is seen sitting at the table where he explains that he was saving Mitsuki's lunch for later. Yukina thinks to herself that they are a long way from love, Mitsuki is then seen on the steps to heaven with Hiyori who is happy she is closer to the gate.
10	"Kanzaki Mitsuki Wants to Live in Peace"; Transliteration: "Kanzaki Mitsuki wa Shizukani Kurashitai" (Japanese: 神前美月は静かに暮らしたい)	March 11, 2014
Mitsuki asks Hiyori if there is a way to change the design of the chastity belt to which she responds by saying it will be fine the way things are. She then upsets Hiyori by bringing up why she isn't doing much herself including trying to remember more about herself which causes her to leave in anger. As the day goes on Mitsuki is happy to finally get time for herself but by dinnertime feels guilty and upset. Yūya notices, and during dinner is able to make her blush by his kindness which confuses Mitsuki as Hiyori isn't around. With her heart throbbing thinking about him, Mitsuki then puts her head on the table. Thinking she is choking Yūya picks her up and performs the Heimlich Maneuver, which causes her instead to have an orgasm. Embarrassed when asked if she is okay, she slaps Yūya leaving him confused. Mitsuki heads to the bathroom where she continues to be confused on why her heart's still throbbing for him, she begins to think of love but then denies it in her mind. When using the bathroom she notices the chastity belt is gone, in a panic thinking that Hiyori has crossed over she goes out looking for her. She tries looking to no avail until Yūya who has been worried looking for Mitsuki shows up. He agrees to help her look for her lost friend who she had a fight with to her relief. She finally finds Hiyori in the place where Mitsuki first collapsed and asks her why the chastity belt disappeared, while smiling Hiyori places it back. Mitsuki goes to a nearby bathroom where Hiyori explains that she had a new chastity belt made for Mitsuki as she wished and that it never truly disappeared fully. Mitsuki makes up with Hiyori when they get home but is mortified at the new more revealing belt design preferring the old one. Yūya is last seen in a convenience store asking if anyone had seen a girl with a big ribbon in her hair with wings on her back.
11	"Ghost ~Phantom in the Bath~"; Transliteration: "Gōsuto 〜Nyūyoku no Maboroshi〜" (Japanese: ゴースト〜入浴の幻〜)	March 18, 2014
In the shopping district, Mitsuki uses four tickets to spin for a chance to win a prize. She ends up winning a trip for two (her, and Yūya) to a hot spring. When they arrive at the hot springs however, Shōtarō, Moa, Yukina, Ayaka, Neko, and Nanami are also present due to Hiyori wanting to win first prize all four times. Yūya offers to carry Mitsuki's bags, but she declines. She gets this awful feeling though when he offers to carry Yukina's bags but dismisses it as Hiyori's connected feeling. Yūya sees that she is upset so to make her feel better he gives her some Dorayaki thinking it was due to hunger. When in the female outdoor bath Mitsuki refuses to undress due to the belt on her, Neko also wears a swimsuit due to a "family policy". While in the bath Yukina tells of Yūya's childhood and what it was like which makes Mitsuki think more on it. During dinner, Yūya goes to check on Mitsuki as she had been gone awhile. Hiyori suggests that she is jealous which she again denies saying it is the result of the synchronizing feelings. When Yūya goes to check on her, Mitsuki brushes him off saying she is fine. Tired of seeing her mope Hiyori then possesses her and heads off to the baths to see Yūya. When they arrive at the bath, both are shocked to see Yukina naked on top of him due to an accidental fall they didn't see. Yūya goes after Mitsuki as she runs off to say she has the wrong idea leaving Yukina behind who mumbles how dense he is. When he catches up to Mitsuki he tells her what really happened and comforts her saying that she is a nice person when she thought otherwise. Weak from the heart on her belt which suffered from the stress, he carries Mitsuki to the game room at the resort to rest which fills the heart more. While in the game room Mitsuki notices her Dorayaki that Yūya had given her earlier and unwraps it. Yukina approaches Mitsuki and takes a bite out of it, saying she is not going to lose to her. Meanwhile, Neko who is watching the whole thing thinks to herself that Yukina is getting carried away so she wants to shake things up a bit.
12	"Farewell, Hiyori-chan"; Transliteration: "Sayonara Hiyori-chan" (Japanese: さよなら日和ちゃん)	March 25, 2014
Yūya encounters Neko that night who asks him how he feels about Mitsuki and Yukina. Unable to get an answer out of him, she puts Yūya into a kind of hypnosis she learned that causes him to be honest with his own desires and how he really feels. By morning when Shōtarō can't wake Yūya everyone comes in until he wakes up. He then blurts out that Mitsuki is really cute, and proceeds to grope Yukina causing her to slap him. Neko explains the short term hypnosis she put him under which causes Mitsuki to blush thinking of what he said. Neko tells everyone that if anyone wants to ask him something they may get an unexpected answer. As the day goes on Yūya is sick with a fever, and Mitsuki thinks over what Neko said. Yukina later comes over and talks to Yūya where he tells to her disappointment that she didn't have to change for him. Yukina also lets Mitsuki know she knew about Hiyori but never said anything. Hiyori sees the chance to be "lovey dovey" after Yukina leaves but Mitsuki refuses due to his fever. Yūya meanwhile, is in his bed unable to sleep as he thinks of both Yukina and Mitsuki. He then awakens and bursts through Mitsuki's door causing her to be embarrassed that she is still half naked. To Mitsuki's surprise, he says that she should stop wearing the "scary panties" (belt) which causes her to kick him out. Hiyori then tells Mitsuki that the heart is full and leads her to the now open golden gate. Hiyori disappears behind the doors along with the belt on Mitsuki but not before saying she wants to be reborn as the child Mitsuki and Yūya have. The next day while leaving for school, Mitsuki finally refers to Yūya as "*Oniichan" rather than "you" or "him" in reference. As the credits roll Mitsuki goes to where she was first possessed by Hiyori only to find her again. Hiyori takes her through the golden gate she went through only to have it lead to a floating island with a sign saying "2F" on it. With another golden gate visible, Hiyori places the belt back on Mitsuki. Hiyori then explains to her that she made the belt 30% more sensitive to make their hearts throb faster together, causing Mitsuki to cry out in embarrassment.

No.	Title	Original release date
OVA	"Recently, My Sister is Unusual OVA"; Transliteration: "Saikin, Imōto no Yōsu ga Chotto Okashiin Da Ga OVA" (Japanese: 最近、妹のようすがちょっとおかしいんだが。OVA)	June 30, 2014
The OVA is broken down into two stories. The first story involves Shōtarō's younger sister Moa having a crush on an older college guy, and asking him to the movies. Shōtarō and Yūya follow them on their "date", but Shōtarō gets the wrong idea in the end. It turns out unknowingly to Moa that the person she had a crush on is a female who had no bad intentions in mind. Moa is touched by her brother's kindness but calls him "Baldy" to save face. The second story takes place during Christmas where Shōtarō, Moa, Yukina, Ayaka, and Neko all have a Christmas party over at Mitsuki's house. Hiyori sees it as a time to get closer to Yūya but acknowledges that Mitsuki is upset about something. Yūya eventually finds out that Mitsuki's birthday was on the 21st, and her mom couldn't be there to celebrate it with her. When Yūya asks her what she wants for her sixteenth birthday, Hiyori takes the opportunity to possesses Mitsuki. She comes out though when Yūya doesn't give what Hiyori was hoping for. In the end, Mitsuki is seen smiling as she receives a new purse from her mother in the mail.

== Live action film ==
No.	Title	Release date
MOVIE	"Recently, My Sister is Unusual"; Transliteration: "Saikin, Imōto no Yōsu ga Chotto Okashiin Da Ga" (Japanese: 最近、妹のようすがちょっとおかしいんだが。)	May 17, 2014
The live action film follows with some differences to the storyline of the anime with what Kadokawa calls as a "shocking climax" to fans of the manga series.

== Release and censorship ==
My Sister is Unusual was first released in DVD format by Imoyco (Kadokawa) from March 26 to August 27, 2014, in total six DVDs were made. Later on in 2014, the series was released in Blu-ray format that has the episodes uncensored with "bubble" artwork that differs from the DVD release cover artwork. An OVA episode was also made, but due to its content it was deemed "too risqué" for television broadcast. Rather than airing it, the episode was only released through the seventh manga volume as a bonus item. The series was also adapted into a live action film that was released in Japan on May 17, 2014. The film stars Tenka Hashimoto, who plays the role of Mitsuki Kanzaki in the anime as well. Outside Japan, Crunchyroll streamed the series with English subtitles. On July 28, 2015, Discotek Media released the series in North America on DVD after acquiring the license, but did not bundle in the OVA episode.

When the anime adaptation of Recently, My Sister is Unusual first aired, it was censored for broadcast. The timeslot chosen to air the episodes had caused controversy in Japan where a decency investigation was launched. The main complaint of the show was Hiyori (one of the main characters) openly talks about masturbation. Following the investigation announcement, Tokyo MX and Sun TV changed the airing time for the episodes to the twilight hours (1:30 - 2:00 am local time). The episodes were also censored which included edits to some of the images, while others deemed offensive were blocked out. With the remedies put into place, no additional credible complaints were brought forward. In North America the unrated series was released without the censoring that had been put into place. The English language release has since been withdrawn from production as Discotek Media's distributor Right Stuf Inc. no longer has it available in their inventory.

== See also ==
- Overall reception of the series
- Oniichan
- Incest taboo
