= Tsukasa =

Tsukasa, most often written 司 or by its hiragana つかさ is a Japanese given name and surname, and can also be written with other kanji, such as 官, 官, 首, 宰 or 吏, or written in katakana, ツカサ and may refer to:

Females:

- Yoko Tsukasa (司 葉子; born 1934), Japanese actress
- Tsukasa Aoi (葵 つかさ, born 1990), Japanese gravure idol
- Tsukasa Fujimoto, Japanese professional wrestler and actress
- Tsukasa Yoshida (芳田 司; born 1995), Japanese judoka

Males:

- Tsukasa Akimoto (秋元 司; born 1971), Japanese politician
- Tsukasa Dokite, animator and character designer
- Tsukasa Endo (born 1961), Japanese long-distance runner
- Fujinoshin Tsukasa (富士乃真 司; born 1960), Japanese sumo wrestler
- Tsukasa Fushimi (伏見 つかさ; born 1981), Japanese writer
- Tsukasa Hirano (平野 司, born 1983), Japanese triathlete
- Tsukasa Hojo, Japanese manga artist and writer
- Tsukasa Hosaka (保坂 司; 1937–2018), Japanese footballer
- Tsukasa Iwamoto (岩本 司; born 1964), Japanese politician
- Tsukasa Kobiki (木挽 司; born 1958), Japanese politician
- Tsukasa Kobonoki (born 1991), Japanese biathlete
- Tsukasa Kotobuki, Japanese character designer
- Tsukasa Masuyama (益山 司; born 1990), Japanese footballer
- Tsukasa Morimoto (森本 良; born 1988), Japanese footballer
- Tsukasa Morishima (森島 司; born 1997), Japanese footballer
- Tsukasa Ozawa (小澤 司; born 1988), Japanese footballer
- Tsukasa Saito, Japanese comedian
- Shinobu Tsukasa, Japanese yakuza lord
- Tsukasa Sonobe Japanese rower
- Tsukasa Shiotani (塩谷 司; born 1988), Japanese footballer
- Tsukasa Tawada (多和田 吏; born 1965), Japanese video game composer and sound effects designer
- Tsukasa Umesaki, Japanese footballer
- Tsukasa Watanabe, Japanese golfer
- Tsukasa (born 1985), Japanese drummer

== Fictional characters ==
- Tsukasa, a dog from the horror video game Forbidden Siren 2
- Tsukasa (.hack), a character in the anime series .hack//Sign
- Tsukasa Ayatsuji, a character in the video game Amagami
- Tsukasa Domyoji, a character in the manga series Hana Yori Dango
- Tsukasa Ebisu, a character in the Revue Starlight franchise
- Tsukasa Hiiragi, a character in the manga series Lucky Star
- Tsukasa Kadoya, a character in the television series Kamen Rider Decade
- Tsukasa Kudamaki, a character in Unconnected Marketeers from the Touhou Project video game series
- Tsukasa Mizugaki, a character in the television series Plastic Memories
- Tsukasa Myojin, a character in the television series Kaitou Sentai Lupinranger VS Keisatsu Sentai Patranger
- Tsukasa Nishino, a character in the manga series Ichigo 100%
- Tsukasa Shiba, a character in the anime series Gundam Build Divers
- Tsukasa Shishio, a character in the manga and anime series Dr. Stone
- Tsukasa Suou (朱桜 司), a character in the Ensemble Stars! franchise
- Tsukasa Tenma (天馬 司), a character in the mobile rhythm game Project Sekai: Colorful Stage! feat. Hatsune Miku
- Tsukasa Yugi, a character in the manga and anime series Jibaku Shounen Hanako-kun
- Tsukasa Yuzaki, a character in the manga and anime series Tonikaku Kawaii
