= 88th =

88th is the ordinal form of the number 88. 88th or Eighty-eighth may also refer to:

- A fraction, 1/88, equal to one of 88 equal parts

== Geography ==
- 88th meridian east, a line of longitude
- 88th meridian west, a line of longitude
- 88th parallel north, a circle of latitude
- 88th parallel south, a circle of latitude
- 88th Street (Manhattan)

== Military ==
- 88th Brigade (disambiguation)
- 88th Division (disambiguation)
- 88th Regiment (disambiguation)
- 88th Squadron (disambiguation)

== Other ==
- 88th century
- 88th century BC

== See also ==
- 88 (disambiguation)
