= Kirito =

Kirito may refer to:

- Kirito (character), fictional character
- Kirito (musician), Japanese musician
