= +88 =

+88 may refer to:

- +880, the telephone country code for Bangladesh
- +881, the telephone country code for the Global Mobile Satellite System (GMSS)
- +882 and +883, the telephone country code for "International Networks", that is telephone systems that are not dedicated to a single country
- +886, the telephone country code for Taiwan
- +888, the now-withdrawn telephone country code for the United Nations Office for the Coordination of Humanitarian Affairs (OCHA)

== See also ==
- 88 (disambiguation)
- 88 (number)
