= Maverick (song) =

Single by D'espairsRay
- Released: February 12, 2003; March 26, 2003 Reissue
- Recorded: Bazooka Studio
- Genre: Alternative metal Industrial metal
- Length: 17:51
- Label: Maniac Records
- Songwriter(s): lyrics: Hizumi; Music: Karyu
- Producer(s): D'espairsRay

D'espairsRay singles chronology
"Ori no Naka de Miru Yume" (2001)	"Maverick" (2003)	"Garnet" (2003)

Alternative cover
- Reissue

"Maverick" is a single released by D'espairsRay on February 12, 2003. It was re-released on March 26, 2003, coming in a DVD-case rather than a normal jewel case. This is also the last release by D'espairsRay on which their name is stylised as "+D'espairsRay+".

== Track listing ==
All lyrics are written by Hizumi.

No.	Title	Music	Length
1.	"Maverick"	Karyu	5:31
2.	"Sou -Bloodymarry- (葬～bloodymarry～)"	Karyu & Tsukasa	1:05
3.	"Marry of the Blood"	Karyu	4:38
4.	"Yami ni Furu Kiseki (闇に降る奇跡)"	Karyu	6:36

- The songs "Marry of the Blood" and "Yami ni Furu Kiseki" were re-recorded for the Born EP
- The Born versions of "Maverick" and "Yami ni Furu Kiseki" were remastered for their greatest hits album, Immortal
- The song "Yami ni Furu Kiseki" was remade for the Horizon single
- Only 5000 copies were pressed at first. There were even less copies pressed for the second pressing; only 3000 copies.
- The song "Marry of the Blood" appears on the band's B-side compilation album, Antique.
