= D'espairsRay =

Japanese band

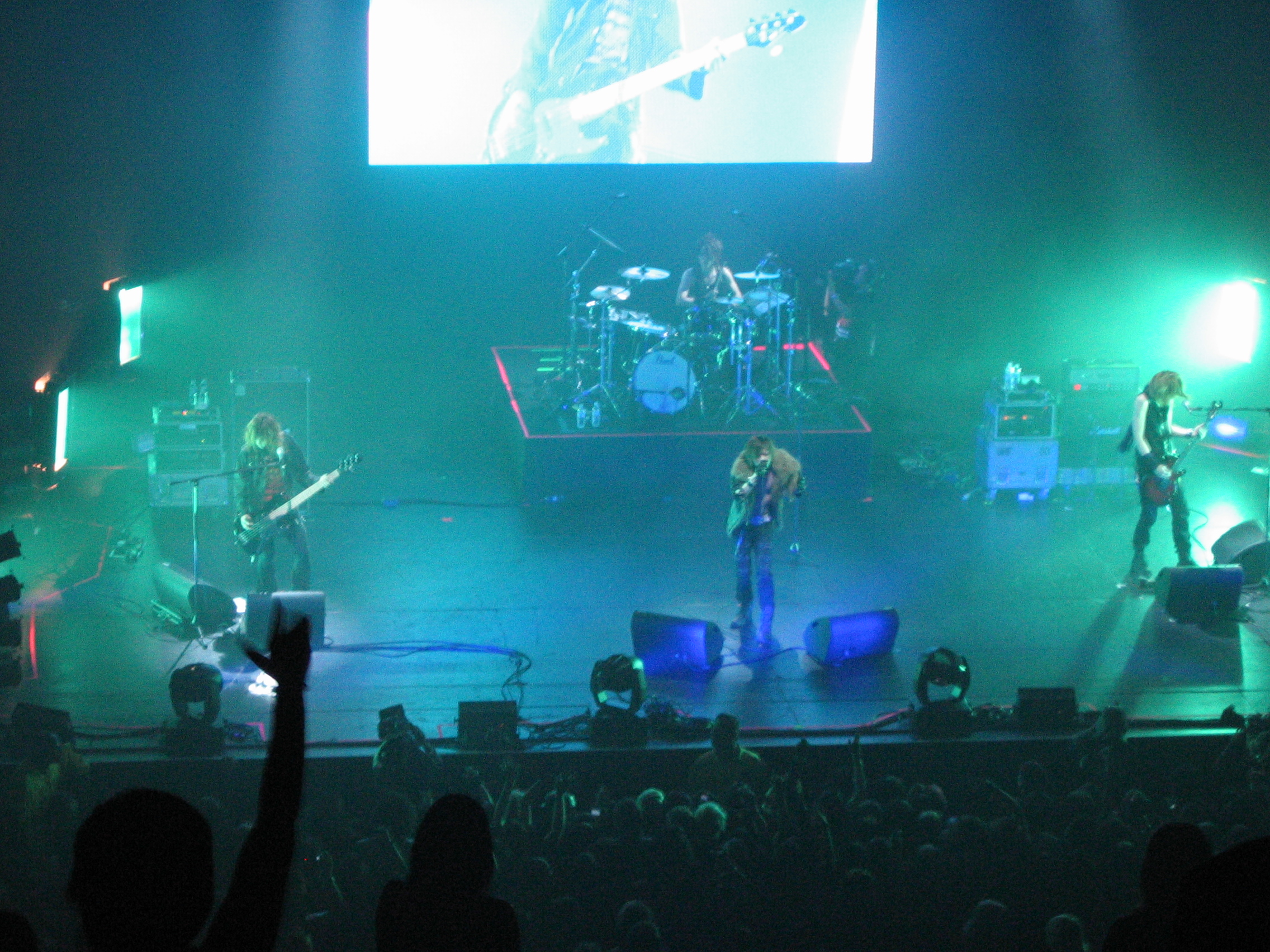
- D'espairsRay in Los Angeles, 2007

Background information
- Also known as: Animalmania
- Origin: Japan
- Genres: Industrial metal; nu metal; alternative metal; gothic metal
- Years active: 1999–2011; 2014; 2025–present
- Labels: Speed Disk; Maniac; Delicious Deli; Sword/Universal; Gan-Shin; Spinefarm; JShock; Maru
- Past members: Hizumi; Karyu; Zero; Tsukasa
- Website: despairsray.com

D'espairsRay (formerly stylized as DéspairsRay, D'ESPAIRSRAY or +DéspairsRay+) is a Japanese visual kei heavy metal band active from 1999 to 2011. The lineup of Hizumi on vocals, Karyu on guitar, Zero on bass and Tsukasa on drums remained the same, with the group having released four full-length records, three EPs and thirteen singles. Outside Japan, D'espairsRay have toured Europe and North America and had domestic releases in those territories.

They performed at the Wacken Open Air festival in 2006, to several thousand people, and a second album, titled Mirror was released on April 11, 2007. They also performed during Jrock Revolution 2007 held on Memorial Weekend in Los Angeles, California. In 2008 they performed at the Taste of Chaos tour in the United States.

On March 11, 2009, their third album Redeemer was released. In the summer of 2010, the band had a world tour entitled Human-Clad Monsters in which they performed in Japan, the US, Canada and Europe. After the last show of the tour, on December 30, the band went on an indefinite hiatus so Hizumi could recover from a rare throat condition. However, on June 15, 2011, D'espairsRay announced that they had no choice but to disband, due to Hizumi's health having no recovery in sight. D'espairsRay reunited for a one-night performance on July 29, 2014.

== History ==
=== 1999–2001: Early career ===
During middle school Karyu's father gave him an electric guitar and taught him how to play; this was the start of his interest in music. While in high school he started to search for band mates, and eventually formed the short lived Dieur Mind. They performed Boøwy covers, until recording their demo tape "Message". But by then Karyu, who at the time went by the name Yoshitaka, was threatening to disband. On Dieur Mind's last tour Karyu randomly met Zero and his band at that time. After dining together they had found they shared the same goals. Later Karyu went and saw Le'Viel, Hizumi and Tsukasa's band. Karyu was so impressed by their performance that he asked Hizumi to join him, but he declined until Le'Viel had broken up. Karyu finally met Tsukasa after Hizumi suggested him for the band.

D'espairsRay was formed on September 9, 1999, by Hizumi (ex-Le'veil), Karyu (ex-Dieur Mind), Zero and Tsukasa (ex-Le'veil). They released their first demotape, Ao, in December of that year. 2000 began with the release of two more demotapes, and during the rest of the year they gained popularity, eventually leading to the release of their first maxi-single in October, Kumo. With only 1000 copies pressed, the CD sold out immediatrely. In April 2001, they released their second maxi-single, "Genwaku", along with a second press of their first maxi-single. Because it had sold out through web-ordering, a second press was released the same day as the first. This was followed by the release of their first EP, Terrors, in July. Their popularity rose after the release of this album and they started to move out of the local scene.

=== 2002–2004: The road to success ===
Following the success of their previous releases, D'espairsRay wanted to give their fans an insider's look into their music, so they released their final demotape, Ura Mania Theater, which was sold at several stores only. They then released their second EP, Sexual Beast in June 2002, along with a second press of their first EP. Once again the CD sold out, so another 2000 copies of their second EP were pressed in July. At the end of 2002, they released another single, titled Ori no Naka de Miru Yume, which came in two editions: a regular edition and a special edition with a bonus track by their alter-ego band Animalmania, which was only available through web-ordering. In January 2003, they gave out a "secret CD" titled tanji, with an unnamed song, to the people who attended one of their live shows. The song would later be renamed Maverick, which was also their next maxi-single, released in February. The CD was reissued in March because of high sales. At the end of 2003, yet another single was released, Garnet.

In April 2004, the band released their third EP, Born. It featured a DVD with the video for the song "Garnet". In July, a second press of the album was released, but without the DVD. Two months later, they released another maxi-single, called Gemini. A limited edition of the CD came with a DVD with the video for the song Born. In 2004 they also played outside Japan for the first time, in Berlin and Paris, gaining them some international fans. Footage for their first live DVD was also shot at the end of 2004.

=== 2005: Going international & Coll:set ===
2005 began with the release of their first live DVD, Murder Day Live. A video for the song "Reddish: Diva Version" was included as a bonus. Soon after, they released their first full-length album, Coll:set. It contained two previously released songs, "Fuyuu Shita Risou" and "Garnet", which were not on the initial limited edition of the album. Their maxi-single "Garnet" was reissued for promotion of their album later that year.

In October they played a short coupling tour titled "Kagerou x D'espairsray COUPLING TOUR 2005 ~龍骸ノ官能~" (Ryuugai no kannou) with Kagerou (蜉蝣) consisting of three gigs. CLUB CITTA' in Kanagawa(October 6), Georg-Elser-Halle in Munich (October 21) and Le Trabendo in Paris (October 23).

=== 2006–2008: Mirror ===
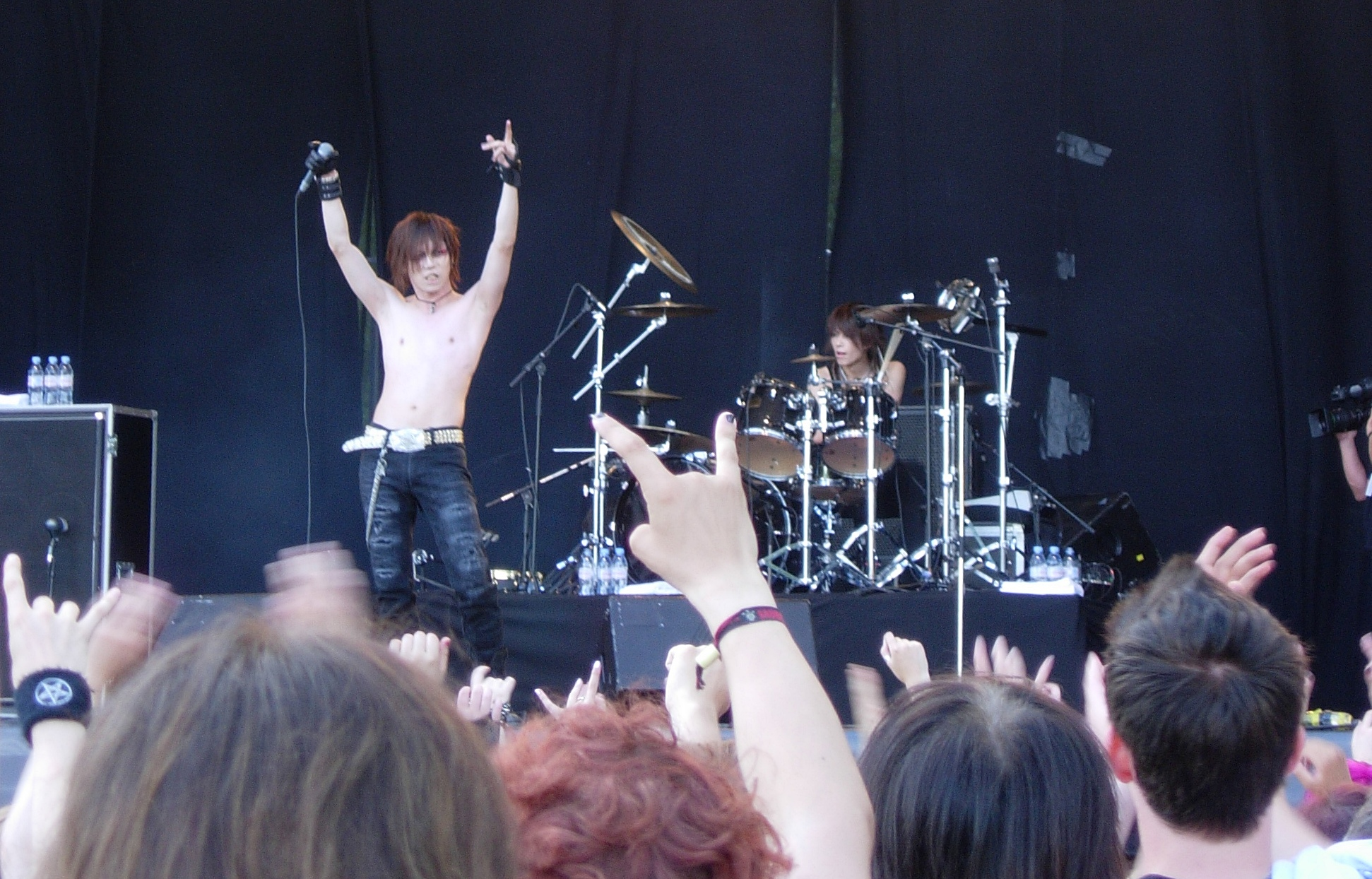
Hizumi and Tsukasa at Ruisrock 2007.

In 2006, they released Coll:set in Europe in January. They toured Europe again and started touring the United States afterwards. A documentary-DVD was released in March, with the title The World Outside the Cage (as a reference to their song The World in a Cage), with footage from their last tour. Soon after that, they released another single, Kogoeru Yoru ni Saita Hana. At the end of 2006, they released their second live DVD, Liquidize, which would also be released in Europe the following year. 2007 began with the release of their latest maxi-single, Squall, in March. One month later, they released their second full-length album, Mirror, which was also released in Europe in June. The year ended with the release of yet another live DVD, Spiral Staircase #15, with footage from their latest tour. The DVD was also released in Europe in January 2008. D'espairsRay participated in the Taste of Chaos 2008 tour, along with fellow Japanese bands Mucc and the Underneath. On May 4, 2008, they performed at the hide memorial summit at Ajinomoto Stadium, along with bands such as X Japan, Luna Sea, Maximum the Hormone and Marbell. Their album Mirror was released in the United States, and their new single "Brilliant" was released on 14 May.

=== 2008–2010: Redeemer, Immortal & Monsters ===
A new single titled "Kamikaze" was released August 6, followed by their "88-99" anniversary tour in Japan. The band announced a winter tour and a new release titled "Horizon", which was released December 3. During the same month, D'espairsRay also announced a new album titled Redeemer, through Delicious Deli Records, a label under Universal Music Japan. The first reported release date was March 4m 2009, however the date was pushed back one week, and was released March 11. The band embarked on a nationwide tour of Japan in promotion of Redeemer named "Psychedelic Parade", and then during July its European brother, "Psychedelic Parade in Europe" began, a tour which included often multiple stops in seven different countries.

They were set to release their first "best of" compilation album, Immortal, and a live DVD of their Shibuya C.C. Lemon Hall performance on December 16, but the release date was pushed back to December 29. Immortal was then released in the United States on April 20, 2010, through Maru Music. During January 2010, the band began recording for a new single. At an instore event during this month, Karyu and Zero briefly and ambiguously told fans that the single would be "dance style". The new single was titled "Love Is Dead" and was released on April 14, 2010.

The band's fourth full-length album entitled Monsters was released in Japan on July 28, 2010. Just five days after the album was out, D'espairsRay began their "Human-Clad Monsters World Tour" starting in Los Angeles, California on August 3.

=== 2010–2011: Hiatus and disbandment ===
On September 20, 2010, D'espairsRay announced on their Facebook page that they would be going on an indefinite hiatus following the conclusion of the "D'espairsRay World Tour 2010 "Human-clad Monsters"". This was due to Hizumi having a rare throat condition which he has suffered with for some time. Although he has undergone treatment for it in the past, he has not been able to find a permanent fix. The band mentioned that the first half of the year was to be focused on Hizumi's recovering, and it was said that Karyu would be writing songs during this time.

The band's last show of the world tour (and last show ever) was held on December 30, 2010. They released a live DVD of said show, titled Human-Clad Monsters Final, on March 30, 2011, along with a compilation album titled Antique. The album features 17 B-Sides, the limited edition contained a DVD with every music video the band has made, from "Garnet" to "Death Point".

On June 15, 2011, it was announced that due to Hizumi's health having no recovery in sight, D'espairsRay had no choice but to disband. There was no farewell concert or tour. The band posted the following note on their official Facebook page on Wednesday, June 15, 2011, at 5:02 am:

On June 15, 2011, D'espairsRay announced their official disbandment via their Facebook page. The decision followed a hiatus that began after their Yokohama Blitz show in December 2010, primarily due to vocalist Hizumi's ongoing throat issues. The band members expressed their gratitude to their fans and staff for their support throughout their career since 1999.

=== Post D'espairsRay and reunion concerts ===
Hizumi started a design company called Umbrella, where he works as an illustrator and in other aspects of design. In May 2019, he formed the band NUL. with guitarist Masato (Defspiral) and programmer Toshiyuki Kishi (Abingdon Boys School).

Karyu joined Angelo in August 2011, which includes Kirito, Kohta, Takeo (all three ex:Pierrot) and Giru (ex:Vidoll). In 2022, Karyu formed the trio H.U.G with vocalist Ryo (Hollowgram) and manipulator and percussionist Kazutoshi Yokoyama.

On August 24, 2011, Zero and Tsukasa formed The Micro Head 4N's with Kazuya and Shun (both ex:Fanatic Crisis), and Ricky (Dasein). They had their first live show on December 1 at Shibuya O-East. Ricky left the group in 2015 and was replaced by Nimo. However, Nimo also left after four years, and vocalist Ameno joined the band in 2019. In 2021, Zero, Kazuya and Shun formed OFIAM as a side project outside of The Micro Head 4N's. Tsukasa acts only as a support member.

Tsukasa also started a solo career as an enka singer in 2014. He is known as the first visual kei enka singer under the name Tsukasa Mogamigawa (最上川 司). He also created an enka unite with Seth from Moi Dix Mois.

D'espairsRay reunited for a performance at Angelo's The Intersection of Dogma event on July 29, 2014, at Zepp Diver City, which also featured Rize, lynch. and Fake?. In 2022, Karyu, Zero and Tsukasa revived Luv Parade, originally a cover band they created for D'espairsRay's 2009 Psychedelic Parade tour in order to give Hizumi a short rest during concerts. With Taka from Defspiral as support vocalist, they performed at Devil's Party 2022 at Spotify O-East on June 20. Luv Parade released their first mini-album, Joker, on June 1, 2024.

D'espairsRay is scheduled to reunite to perform at the first day of the Cross Road Fest, which will take place at the Makuhari Event Hall on November 15, 2025.

=== D'espairsRay 2025 Revival ===
D'espairsRay has officially announced their long-awaited return to the stage. On September 9 (2025), the anniversary of the band’s formation, D'espairsRay has stunned the fans by revealing that they will reunite for a one-night-only solo performance titled D’ESPAIRSRAY LIVE 2026『RAPTURE』on May 4, 2026, at Zepp DiverCity Tokyo (Japan). This will mark their first solo concert in 15 years.

In an exclusive interview for VMJ by Mandah Frénot reuniting the four members of D'espairsRay, the band talked about their reunion and that they are currently thinking about making new music together.

== Members ==
- Hizumi – lead vocals
- Karyu – guitar, programming, backing vocals
- Zero – bass, backing vocals
- Tsukasa – drums, percussion, programming

== Discography ==
D'espairsRay discography
- Studio albums: 4
- Extended plays: 3
- Compilation albums: 2
- Singles: 13
- B-sides: 27
- Video albums: 7
- Music videos: 11

Studio albums

- 2005: Coll:set Oricon Weekly Album Chart Top Position: 97
- 2007: Mirror Oricon Weekly Album Chart Top Position: 36
- 2009: Redeemer Oricon Weekly Album Chart Top Position: 39
- 2010: Monsters Oricon Weekly Album Chart Top Position: 49

EPs

- 2001: Terrors
- 2002: Sexual Beast
- 2004: Born

Compilation albums

- 2009: Immortal
- 2011: [Antique]

Demo tapes

- 1999: "Ao" [蒼]
- 2000: "System"
- 2000: "Sakura" (さくら)
- 2000: "Razor"
- 2002: "Ura Mania Theatre" (裏マニアシアター)

Singles

- 2000: "Kumo" (蜘蛛)
- 2001: "Genwaku" (眩-げんわく-惑)
- 2002: "Ori no Naka de Miru Yume" (檻の中で見る夢)
- 2003: "Maverick" Oricon Weekly Single Chart Top Position: 70
- 2003: "Garnet" Oricon Weekly Single Chart Top Position: 70
- 2004: "Gemini" Oricon Weekly Single Chart Top Position: 46
- 2006: "Kogoeru Yoru ni Saita Hana" (凍える夜に咲いた花) Oricon Weekly Single Chart Top Position: 41
- 2007: "Squall" Oricon Weekly Single Chart Top Position: 42
- 2008: "Brilliant" Oricon Weekly Single Chart Top Position: 30
- 2008: "Kamikaze" Oricon Weekly Single Chart Top Position: 30
- 2008: "Horizon" Oricon Weekly Single Chart Top Position: 47
- 2009: "Final Call" Oricon Weekly Single Chart Top Position:16
- 2010: "Love Is Dead" Oricon Weekly Single Chart Top Position: 16

Videos

- 2002: Ura Video
- 2005: Murder Day Live
- 2006: The World Outside the Cage
- 2006: Liquidize: Live Tour '06
- 2007: Spiral Staircase # 15
- 2009: 10th Anniversary Live Closer to Ideal: Brandnew Scene
- 2011: Human-clad Monsters: Final
