= Redeemer (D'espairsRay album) =

Studio album by D'espairsRay
- Released: March 11, 2009
- Recorded: 2008–2009
- Genre: Alternative metal, industrial metal, gothic metal
- Length: 54:07
- Label: Sword/UMG (JP); Spinefarm Records UK (EU)
- Producer: D'espairsRay; Shinobu Narita

D'espairsRay chronology
Mirror (2007)	Redeemer (2009)	Monsters (2010)

Professional ratings
Review scores
Source	Rating
AllMusic	4/5 stars
NEO Magazine	4/5 stars

Redeemer is the third album by D'espairsRay released on March 11, 2009 in Japan. The album was released in Europe on May 24, 2009.

The album has also been released in the United States at Hot Topic and other record stores.

== Track listing ==
All lyrics are written by Hizumi; all music is composed by Karyu except Kohaku written and composed by Tsukasa.

No.	Title	Length
1.	"Lizard"	4:29
2.	"Brilliant"	4:37
3.	"Redeemer"	4:28
4.	"Kohaku" (琥珀)	4:28
5.	"Kamikaze"	4:23
6.	"Lost in Re:birth"	4:09
7.	"R.E.M -Fuyu no Genchou-" (R.E.M -冬の幻聴-)	4:58
8.	"Horizon"	4:08
9.	"Masquerade"	4:00
10.	"Yozora" (夜空)	4:17
11.	"Paradox 5"	5:41
12.	"Heaven's Color"	4:41
Total length:		54:07

== Personnel ==
- Hizumi – vocals
- Karyu – guitar
- Zero - bass guitar
- Tsukasa – drums
