= Finale (Pierrot album) =

Studio album by Pierrot
- Released: July 7, 1999
- Genres: Alternative rock; hard rock
- Length: 59:52
- Language: Japanese
- Label: EMI
- Producer: Shinobu Narita

Pierrot chronology
Celluloid (1997)	Finale (1999)	Private Enemy (2000)

Singles from Finale
- 1. "Clear Sky" Released: September 10, 1998; 2. "Mad Sky -Koutetsu no Meshia-" Released: December 2, 1998; 3. "Haruka.../Kanata e..." Released: February 24, 1999; 4. "Last Letter" Released: April 28, 1999

Finale is the fourth studio album by Japanese visual kei rock band Pierrot, released on July 7, 1999, produced by Shinobu Narita. Album's singles are "Clear Sky", "Mad Sky -Koutetsu no Meshia-", "Haruka.../Kanata e..." and "Last Letter".

It is the band's debut major album, released by EMI. The first edition was limited, with special packaging including bonus items. It was re-released on December 19, 2001. Finale became available on music streaming services along with the group's major works on September 10, 2024.

== Musical style ==
OK Music website stated that the lyrics have many romantic and dramatic passages, comparing them to a shōjo manga. In terms of musicality, they said the band has "rock standards" with a bit of avant-garde, and also mentioned that some tracks incorporate psychedelic rock and others punk rock. CD Journal said the lyrics depict a "decadent world" and mentioned the digital guitar sounds and traditional Irish elements in the songs. They also said producer Narita brought a "retro '80s" feel to the music.

== Commercial performance ==
Finale debuted at number five on Oricon Albums Chart and stayed on chart for seven weeks, selling 171,180 copies while on chart. It reached the same number on Billboard Japan, and sold around 190,000 copies in total. It was certified gold disc by RIAJ for selling more than 100,000 copies.

It is Pierrot's best-selling studio album and the one that reached the highest position on Oricon. The singles are also the best-selling of the band, with "Clear Sky", "Mad Sky -Koutetsu no Meshia-", "Haruka.../Kanata e..." and "Last Letter" reaching sixth, fifth, tenth and fifth position on Oricon, respectively.

== Track listing ==
Finale track listing
No.	Title	Length
1.	"Finale"	4:40
2.	"Haruka.." (ハルカ...)	4:43
3.	"Creative Master"	3:57
4.	"Kanata e..." (カナタヘ・・・)	3:45
5.	"ECO=system"	4:12
6.	"Magnet Holic"	3:17
7.	"Mad Sky -Koutetsu no Meshia-" (MAD SKY -鋼鉄の救世主-)	4:18
8.	"Sacred"	5:40
9.	"Icaross"	3:59
10.	"Last Letter" (ラストレター)	6:01
11.	"Clear Sky" (クリア・スカイ)	5:32
12.	"Child"	6:02
13.	"Newborn Baby"	3:29
Total length:		59:52

== Personnel ==
- Kirito – vocals
- Aiji – guitar
- Jun – guitar
- Kohta – bass
- Takeo – drums
- Shinobu Narita – producer
