= 88 =

88 may refer to:

== General uses ==
- 88 (number), the natural number following 87 and preceding 89
- one of the years 88 BC, AD 88, 1988, 2088
- Highway 88, see List of highways numbered 88
- The 88 (San Jose), a residential skyscraper in San Jose, California, USA
- The 88, a nickname for the piano derived from the number of keys it typically has
- A Morse code abbreviation meaning "Love and kisses"
- 88 (film), a 2015 film directed by April Mullen, starring Katharine Isabelle
- Atomic number 88: radium
- The butterfly genus Diaethria, which has an 88-like pattern on its wings
- The butterfly genus Callicore, which has an 88-like pattern on its wings
- 88, a neo-Nazi symbol and code number for "Heil Hitler", based on "H" being the eighth letter of the alphabet
  - Usage by neo-Nazi groups
- 88 Thisbe, a main-belt asteroid
- Oldsmobile 88, a full-sized car produced by General Motors

== Weaponry ==
- Gewehr 88, German rifle introduced in 1888
  - Patrone 88, associated rifle cartridge
  - Hanyang 88, Chinese rifle based on the Gewehr 88
- 8.8 cm Flak 18/36/37/41, known as the eighty-eight, a German anti-tank and anti-aircraft gun introduced in 1936

== Music ==
- The 88, an American indie rock band
- The 88 (album), the 2003 debut album by New Zealand band Minuit
- 88, a 1988 album by Portuguese band Xutos & Pontapés
- 88, a 1991 album by American band The 77s
- 88 (song), a 2008 single by LM.C
- "88", a song by Sum 41 from Chuck
- "88", a song by The Cool Kids from The Bake Sale

== Organizations ==
- 88 Generation Students Group, a Burmese pro-democracy movement
- 88th Reconnaissance and Sabotage Brigade, also known as Espanola, a former Russian irregular military formation created from radical fans of football clubs
- Squadron 88, an Australian far-right extremist group
- Unit 88, a New Zealand neo-Nazi group of the 1990s

== See also ==
- 88th (disambiguation)
