= LM.C (Japanese band) =

Japanese visual kei rock duo

- Also known as: Lovely-Mocochang.Com; LmC
- Origin: Japan
- Genres: Electronic rock; synthpop; pop punk; power pop; rap rock
- Years active: 2006–present
- Label: Pony Canyon
- Members: Maya; Aiji
- Website: Official site

LM.C is a Japanese visual kei rock duo playing a mix of electronic rock and pop, which they call "new century electrorock".

== History ==
LM.C was founded by Maya, who was formerly a guitarist for musician Miyavi in his support band Ishihara Gundan, and a guitarist in his own band The Sinners. While still with Miyavi, Maya and other support members also played live shows as LM.C. Later they were joined by Aiji of Pierrot.

After Maya quit Miyavi's band and Aiji's band Pierrot disbanded, LM.C made their major label debut in October 2006, releasing two singles, "Trailers (Gold)" and "Trailers (Silver)". As 2007 began, the group came out with a third single, "Oh My Juliet", which was the second ending theme for the Red Garden anime. On March 7, they released their first EP, Glitter Loud Box.

They released their fourth single, "Boys and Girls", in June 2007, featured as the second opening theme for the Katekyō Hitman Reborn! anime. Their fifth single, "Liar Liar/Sentimental Piggy Romance", was released in October 2007, and their sixth single, "Bell the Cat", was released in December of the same year.

In 2008, LM.C released "John" in the winter and "88", another opening theme for the Katekyō Hitman Reborn! anime, in the summer. LM.C then debuted in North America, performing at Anime Expo's "Battle of the Bands" on 3 July 2008, followed by a concert at the Crash Mansion in Los Angeles, California on 5 July.

Also in July, they performed their first hall concert at C.C. Lemon Hall in Shibuya, Japan. Tickets to the show were sold out within two minutes. Also in July, they were invited to perform at the "Formoz Festival" in Taiwan as a main act for the second consecutive year. In November, LM.C's first album Super Glitter Loud Box and the second album Gimmical Impact!! were simultaneously released worldwide. These two albums were also available worldwide on main music download stores on the same day.

In March 2010, the band released the album Wonderful Wonderholic. In October 2010, the band released a new single called "Let Me' Crazy!!" which featured their two new songs: "Let Me' Crazy!!" and "No Fun, No Future". Both songs had a PV released for them.

In July 2011, the band's single "Hoshi no Arika" was featured as the first opening theme for Nura: Rise of the Yokai Clan second season. In October 2011, the band's single "The Love Song" will be released as the second opening theme for Nura: Rise of the Yokai Clan second season. "The Love Song" will be on the ☆★Best the LM.C☆★2006-2011 Singles album on October 12, 2011

In February 2012, their latest single "Ah Hah" was released, followed by their 4th original full album STRONG POP in April. The band also starts their live 2012 tour "-Strong Pop-", which has many concerts worldwide.

In 2013, the group released the single "My Favorite Monster", and in 2014, their 2nd and 3rd mini-albums Perfect Fantasy and Perfect Rainbow. They also released the DVD LM.C Yaon de Fever Max!!! exclusively for fanclub members.

== Appearances ==
On November 16, 2008, the band embarked on their first world tour, the LM.C Tour '08-'09. The tour included stops in South America, Europe, and Asia for a total of 34 shows in twelve countries.

LM.C was scheduled to appear at A-Kon in Dallas, Texas, on May 29, 2009, but canceled due to threats of Swine flu. All other overseas tours were canceled by Pony Canyon.

The band's European tour started on April 3, 2010, with a total of twelve shows in eight different countries. In May, LM.C appeared at FanimeCon 2010 in San Jose, California, where they performed on May 30 and also held a Q&A panel the day after.

LM.C appeared at Anime Central in Rosemont, Illinois, on April 27, 2012, where they kicked off their world tour. The band performed at the convention and participated in a Q&A and autograph session.

In August 2017, for the 25th anniversary of Anime Fest in Dallas, Texas, LM.C performed as the music guest, hosted a Q&A, and several autograph sessions. Several months later in early April 2018, LM.C was the musical guest for the Tekko anime convention in Pittsburgh, Pennsylvania. Again they performed a concert, hosted a Q&A, and hosted a meet & greet in which fans were able to shake hands with the band members. Later, after the end of the convention, they played the private concert held at the Hard Rock Cafe for staff and Rockstar badge holders.

== Members ==
- Maya – lead vocals, rhythm guitar, synthesizers
- Aiji – lead guitar, synthesizers, backing vocals

=== Support band ===
- Hiko – bass
- Death-O – drums
- JayKay – keyboard
- Denkiman – VJ

2009 world tour support

- Mackaz – bass
- Death-O – drums
- Jun – keyboard
- Denkiman – VJ

2010 world tour support

- Ken – bass
- Yuya – drums
- Jun – keyboard
- Denkiman – VJ, Para Para

2012 world tour support

- Mackaz - bass
- Sassy - drums
- Nom Nom - keyboard
- Denkiman - VJ

== Discography ==
=== Albums and EPs ===
- Glitter Loud Box (03.07.2007) (Mini-Album)
- Gimmical Impact!! (11.05.2008)
- Super Glitter Loud Box (11.05.2008)
- Wonderful Wonderholic (03.03.2010)
- ☆★Best the LM.C☆★2006-2011 Singles (10.12.2011)
- Strong Pop (04.04.2012)
- LM.C B-Side BEST!! (08.05.2013)
- PERFECT FANTASY (02.12.2014) (Mini-Album)
- PERFECT RAINBOW (12.17.2014) (Mini-Album)
- Over The Fantasy, Under The Rainbow. (10.31.2015) (Team LM.C limited release)
- VEDA (21.12.2016)
- Future Sensation (08.08.2018)
- Brand New Songs (03.04.2020)

=== Singles ===
- "Trailers (Gold)" (10.04.2006)
- "Trailers (Silver)" (10.04.2006)
- "Oh My Juliet." (01.31.2007)
- "Boys & Girls" (05.23.2007)
- "Liar Liar"/"Sentimental Piggy Romance" (10.10.2007)
- "Bell the Cat" (12.12.2007)
- "John" (02.20.2008)
- "88" (06.04.2008)
- "Punky❤Heart" (05.20.2009)
- "Ghost†Heart" (11.04.2009)
- "Let Me' Crazy" (10.27.2010)
- "Super Duper Galaxy" (05.18.2011)
- "星の在処。(Hoshi no Arika)" (07.27.2011)
- "The Love Song" (10.12.2011)
- "Ah Hah!" (02.22.2012)
- "Double Dragon" (11.28.2012)
- "My Favorite Monster" (12.11.2013)
- "MONROEwalk" (03.16.2016)
- "レインメーカー (Rain Maker)" (07.20.2016)
- "ChainDreamers" (07.11.2018)
- "Campanella" (13.02.2020)
- "No Emotion" (28.02.2020)
- "Happy Zombies" (03.04.2020)

=== Compilations ===
- Luna Sea Memorial Cover Album -Re:birth- - with "In My Dream (With Shiver)" (December 19, 2007)

=== DVDs ===
- LM.C The Music Videos (4 June 2008, music videos)
- Rock the Party '08 (17 September 2008)
- The Live of the Wonderful Wonderholic (28 July 2010)
- ★Rock the Party★ 2012 - at Nippon Budokan (16 May 2012)
- LM.C Yaon de FEVER MAX!!! (7 September 2014) (Team LM.C limited release)
