= Yasuaki Takumi =

Japanese actor and voice actor

- たくみ 靖明
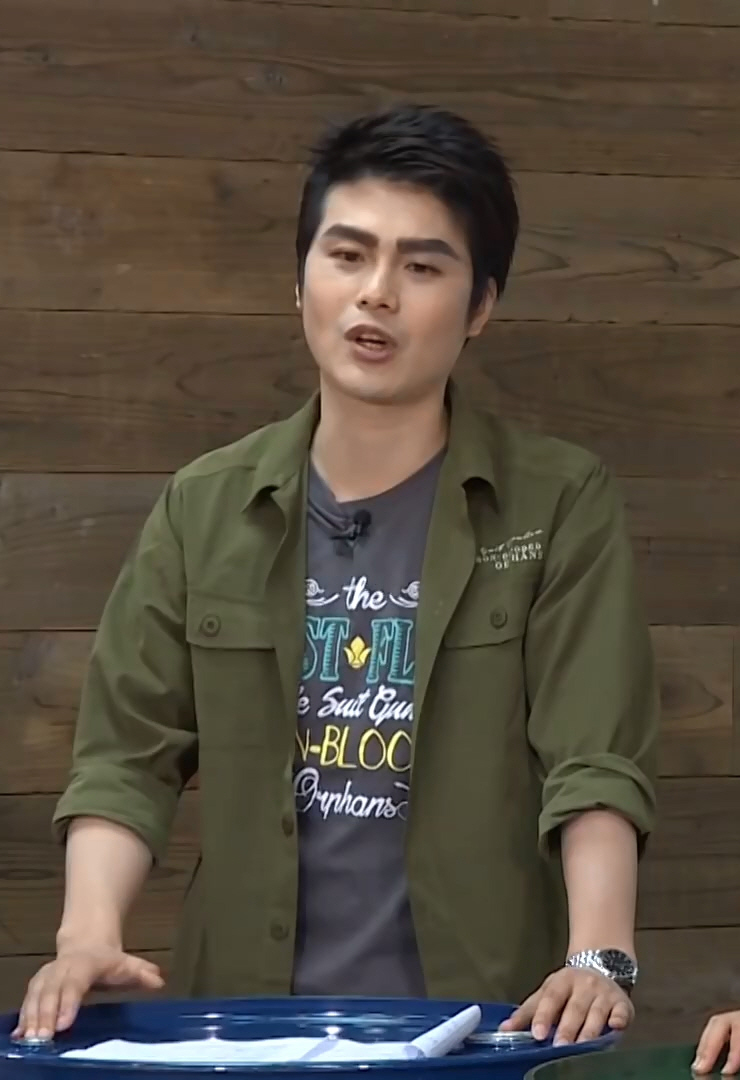
- Born: October 23, 1982 (age 44); Aichi Prefecture, Japan
- Occupations: Actor; voice actor
- Years active: 2004–present
- Agent: Tokyo Actor's Consumer's Cooperative Society
- Spouse: Aki Nakajima (m. 2021)

Yasuaki Takumi (たくみ 靖明, Takumi Yasuaki(former name in kanji; 内匠 靖明)(born October 23, 1982）is a Japanese actor and voice actor. He is affiliated with Tokyo Actor's Consumer's Cooperative Society. He is best known for his voice role as Warrior on Goblin Slayer. On April 9, 2021, Takumi announced that he married Aki Nakajima.

== Filmography ==
=== Anime series ===
- Nogizaka Haruka no Himitsu (2008), Amateur photographer D
- Bleach (2009), Soul Reaper
- K-On! (2009), Garbage collection voice
- Bakugan Battle Brawlers: New Vestroia (2009), Ace Grit
- Kimi ni Todoke (2009), Shin Mikami
- Durarara!! (2010), Blue Square D, Boy
- K-ON! Season 2 (2010), Man
- Shiki (2010), Masaki Tashiro, Tamotsu Mutō, Tsurumi
- Star Driver (2010), Classmate
- Kimi ni Todoke 2nd Season (2011), Tomokazu Tsuruoka, Shin Mikami
- Hanasaku Iroha (2011), Student
- Sket Dance (2011), Delinquent C, Film Society member
- Yu-Gi-Oh! Zexal (2011), Fallguys Coyote, Taiichi (classmate)
- Moshidora (2011), Daisuke Niimi
- Ro-Kyu-Bu! (2011), Upperclassman
- The Idolmaster (2011), Cameraman, MC B
- Battle Spirits: Heroes (2011), Ryūta Furuya
- Persona 4: The Animation (2011), Minoru Inoue
- Last Exile: Fam, The Silver Wing (2011), Reporting soldier, Superior officer
- Ben-To (2011), Club member A, Shōbenkosō, Wolf A, Wolf B
- High School DxD (2012), Matsuda
- The Familiar of Zero F (2012), Ari
- Lagrange: The Flower of Rin-ne (2012), Aran Wan, Noboru Minamizawa, Raito Egami, Shigeki Hamamoto, Torichery
- Waiting in the Summer (2012), Schoolboy C, Student A
- Lagrange: The Flower of Rin-ne (2012), Aran Wan, Cero, Crimale, Ijimi Yoshimasu, Nakaya Tsurumoto
- Cross Fight B-Daman eS (2012), Kamon Godai
- Yu-Gi-Oh! Zexal II (2012), Taichi
- Zettai Karen Children (2013), Announcer
- The Severing Crime Edge (2013), Newscaster
- Devil Survivor 2: The Animation (2013), Civilian A
- High School DxD New (2013), Matsuda
- Recently, My Sister Is Unusual (2014), Shōtarō Torii
- Yu-Gi-Oh! Arc-V (2014), Michio Mokota
- Jinsei (2014), Yūki Akamatsu
- Lord Marksman and Vanadis (2014), Olivier
- Yatterman Night (2015), Yatter Soldier A
- High School DxD BorN (2015), Matsuda
- Plastic Memories (2015), Tsukasa Mizugaki
- Charlotte (2015), Gondō
- Snow White with the Red Hair (2015), Shikito
- Seiyu's Life! (2015), Mixer
- Mobile Suit Gundam: Iron-Blooded Orphans (2015), Akihiro Altland
- Momokuri (2016), Ema Sawaguchi
- Nurse Witch Komugi R (2016), Hiroto Tachibana
- Beyblade Burst (2016), Hanami, Señor Hanami, Gunta Hanami, Anami Unta
- Mahojin Guru Guru (2017), Yanban (ep. 7)
- Gamers! (2017), Gakuto Kase
- Knight's & Magic (2017), Edgar C. Blanche
- Golden Kamuy (2018), Toraji
- Zoids Wild (2018), Zodars (ep. 1 - 2)
- That Time I Got Reincarnated as a Slime (2018), Karion
- Goblin Slayer (2018), Warrior
- Requiem of the Rose King (2022), George, Duke of Clarence
- Twilight Out of Focus (2024), Rudy
- Hikuidori (2026), Renji
- Shin Oishinbo (2027), Isamu Kinjō

=== Original net animation ===
- Tawawa on Monday (2016), Senior
- The Way of the Househusband (2021), Yuzuru (ep. 9)

=== Original video animation ===
- Rinne no Lagrange: Kamogawa Days (2012), Tadashi Kamidake
- High School DxD (2012), Matsuda
- Paradise of Innocence (2014), Shōta
- Recently, My Sister Is Unusual (2014), Shōtarō Torii

=== Anime films ===
- Hiyokoi (2010), Hiiragi
- 009 Re:Cyborg (2012), Non-Com

=== Tokusatsu ===
- Jyuken Sentai Gekiranger (2007), Confrontation Beast-Ostrich Fist Chouda (ep. 29 - 30)
- Engine Sentai Go-onger (2008), Savage Water Barbaric Machine Beast Hikigane Banki (ep. 13)
- Samurai Sentai Shinkenger Returns (2010), Chairman
- Kaizoku Sentai Gokaiger (2011), Non-commissioned Officers Sugormin (ep. 10 (Voiced by Yoshimitsu Shimoyama (ep. 1), Kenichirou Matsuda (ep. 10), Kensuke Tamura (ep. 12), Ibuki (ep. 34)))

=== Video games ===
- MapleStory (2013), Zero (Alpha)
- Final Fantasy XIV: Heavensward (2015), Zephirin
- Fire Emblem Fates (2015), Shiro
- Yume Oukoku To Nemureru 100-nin No Ouji-sama (2015), Prytwen
- Need for Speed Payback (2017), Tyler Morgan
- For Whom the Alchemist Exists (2016), Magnus
- Plastic Memories (2016)

=== Dubbing ===
- Wander Over Yonder (2014), Wander
