= Angelo (band) =

Japanese visual kei rock band

- Origin: Japan
- Genres: Hard rock; industrial rock; alternative metal
- Years active: 2006–2022
- Labels: East Link; Sony/Music Ray'n; Avex Group/Blowgrow
- Members: Kirito; Kohta; Takeo; Karyu; Giru
- Website: angeloweb.jp/index.php

Angelo is a Japanese visual kei rock supergroup, formed in 2006 by three members of Pierrot. Originally a trio of vocalist Kirito, bassist Kohta and drummer Takeo, guitarists Karyu (ex-D'espairsRay) and Giru (ex-Vidoll) joined in 2011. In January 2022, Angelo began a three-and-a-half year hiatus that is scheduled to end in October 2025.

== History ==
Four months after Pierrot disbanded, Kirito, Kohta and Takeo formed Angelo on August 14, 2006. They held "The Creature was Reborn Out of Hades" free concert at Yoyogi Park on October 4 to an audience of 5,000. The trio produced their first single, aptly titled "Reborn", on November 8 and began the Broken World, After the Heaven tour three days later. They released their first album Rebirth of Newborn Baby on April 18, 2007, and quickly followed it with the mini-album The Freak Show on December 21.

In 2008, they released the singles "Chaotic Bell" and "Sister" on June and October 22, respectively. Also in October, Angelo held fan-club only activities in Los Angeles, including a concert at the Whisky a Go Go. The band released their second album Metallic Butterfly on April 22, 2009. Angelo performed at the two-day V-Rock Festival '09 on October 24, 2009. They held their first New Year's countdown concert on December 31, 2009 at the second gymnasium at Yoyogi National Gymnasium.

Their sixth single, "Hikari no Kioku" released on February 17, 2010, was used as the ending theme song of the Tegami Bachi anime. Likewise, the next single "El Dorado" was used as the first ending theme of the Sengoku Basara II anime, before being replaced by its follow up "Fate". All three songs were included on the album Design, released on October 6, 2010.

Their eighth single "Calvary" went on sale on February 22, 2011. Before the release of the album Babel on October 5, guitarists Karyu and Giru, whose bands D'espairsRay and Vidoll both disbanded that same year, joined Angelo as full members in August. On August 17, 2012, Angelo hosted their first Intersection of Dogma concert ay Shibuya-AX, where they performed alongside Merry, Sadie, Girugamesh and lynch. The album Retina was released on November 14 in four editions, limited edition A came with a DVD of the first half of their June 30 concert at NHK Hall, while limited edition B included the second half.

2013's Intersection of Dogma event was held at Shibuya-AX on August 16 with lynch., Inoran, Mucc and heidi. Angelo's album Faith was released on November 27. Intersection of Dogma 2014 was held on July 29 at Zepp Diver City and featured lynch., Fake?, Rize and a one night only reunion performance by D'espairsRay. In May 2015, Angelo began their eleven date Creating a Singularity tour. The fourth installment of their annual Intersection of Dogma concert was held on August 5 and included D'erlanger, Cali Gari, lynch. and Diaura.

Angelo covered "Dummy Blue" by D'erlanger for the 2017 D'erlanger Tribute Album ~Stairway to Heaven~. Their twelfth studio album, Evolve, was released on November 11, 2020. It was supported by The Forced Evolve tour, which began on November 17 and ended on January 10, 2021 at Tsutaya O-East. Angelo then began a tour titled The Countdown on April 30, which ended on July 13 following postponements due to the COVID-19 pandemic in Japan. They also performed a hall tour called Mephisto Decided from June 26 to August 1.

On August 1, 2021, Angelo announced that they would be going on indefinite hiatus in January 2022. They performed 15th anniversary concerts at Toyosu Pit on October 3 and 4 and released the album Circle on November 17. The album was supported by The End of Circle tour from November 20 to January 9, before the band performed their final concerts, titled Connected New Circles, at the second gymnasium at Yoyogi National Gymnasium on January 15 and 16, 2022. After three and a half years, the band is scheduled to end the hiatus on October 4 and 5, 2025, with two concerts at the same venue.

== Members ==
Current members

- Kirito (キリト) – vocals (2006–2022)
- Kohta – bass (2006–2022)
- Takeo – drums (2006–2022)
- Karyu – guitar (2011–2022)
- Giru (ギル) – guitar (2011–2022)

Former support member

- Toruxxx – guitar (The Mad Capsule Markets)

== Discography ==
=== Studio albums ===
- Rebirth of Newborn Baby (April 18, 2007) Oricon Albums Chart Peak Position: 19
- Metallic Butterfly (April 22, 2009) 20
- Design (October 6, 2010) 20
- Babel (October 5, 2011) 13
- Retina (November 14, 2012) 23
- Faith (November 27, 2013) 23
- Psyche (December 17, 2014) 16
- Cord (September 28, 2016) 19
- Heterodox (September 27, 2017) 17
- Resonance (November 14, 2018) 19
- Faust (November 6, 2019) 18
- Evolve (November 11, 2020) 32
- Circle (November 17, 2021) 18

=== Mini albums ===
- The Freak Show (December 21, 2007)
- Factor (September 30, 2015) 29
- Result (December 2, 2015) 32

=== Singles ===
- "Reborn" (November 8, 2006) Oricon Singles Chart Peak Position: 11
- "Winter Moon" (February 28, 2007) 13
- "Chaotic Bell" (June 11, 2008) 9
- "Sister" (October 22, 2008) 13
- "Usubeni no Kakera" (薄紅の欠片; March 25, 2009) 12
- "Hikari no Kioku" (光の記憶; February 17, 2010) 9
- "El Dorado" (July 28, 2010) 17
- "Fate" (August 25, 2010) 34
- "Calvary" (February 22, 2011) 14
- "Rip/Moment" (June 27, 2012) 14
- "Outbreak" (August 14, 2013) 22
- "Scare" (October 8, 2014) 10

=== Compilation albums ===
- Locus (January 26, 2021)
