= Mirror (D'espairsRay album) =

Studio album by D'espairsRay
- Released: April 11, 2007
- Studio: aLive Recording Studio; Studio 446; Power House Studio; Swing Bamboo Studio; BX-Studio
- Genre: Industrial metal; nu metal; alternative metal
- Length: 56:35 (JP); 61:06 (EU)
- Label: Sword/UMG (JP); Gan-Shin/UMG (EU)
- Producer: D'espairsRay; Shinobu Narita

D'espairsRay chronology
Coll:set (2005)	Mirror (2007)	Redeemer (2009)

Singles from Mirror
- 1. "Kogoeru Yoru ni Saita Hana" Released: April 5, 2006; 2. "Squall" Released: March 14, 2007

Professional ratings
Review scores
Source	Rating
AllMusic	4/5 stars

Mirror is the second album released by D'espairsRay on April 11, 2007 in Japan and on June 22 of the same year in Europe. The first press limited edition release from Japan came housed in a paper case along with one of five picture cards that feature one of the band members. The album was released in America on March 18, 2008. The album is composed of new songs, previously released singles, and "Closer to Ideal", a track originally published on the bonus CD of the Liquidize photo book. The European edition comes with an additional track ("Desert", a B-side from the "Squall" single) and the music videos of "Squall" and "Trickster".

== Music ==
The music in Mirror has a notably more variable sound than the previous Coll:set album. It retains some of the gothic influence, while introducing an experimental pop music sound. Most of the album has a very fast tempo, only slowing for "Screen" and "Squall", however the band has called this unintentional.

== Track listing ==
Disc one
No.	Title	Lyrics	Music	Length
1.	"Damned"	Hizumi	Karyu	4:48
2.	"Trickstər"	Hizumi	Karyu	4:17
3.	"MIЯROR"	Hizumi	Karyu	4:10
4.	"Sixty∞Nine"	Hizumi	Karyu	4:34
5.	"Kogoeru Yoru ni Saita Hana" (凍える夜に咲いた花)	Hizumi	Karyu	5:07
6.	"Screen"	Hizumi	Karyu, Tsukasa	4:50
7.	"Lost Scene"	Hizumi	Tsukasa	4:28
8.	"Hollow"	Shinobu Narita	Shinobu Narita	4:11
9.	"Closer to Ideal"	Karyu	Karyu	6:02
10.	"Angeldust"	Hizumi	Karyu	4:19
11.	"Squall"	Hizumi	Karyu	4:56
12.	"Kaleidoscope"	Hizumi	Karyu	4:53
13.	"Desert" (European edition only)	Hizumi	Karyu	4:31

== Personnel ==
- Hizumi – vocals
- Karyu – guitar
- Zero - bass guitar
- Tsukasa – drums
