= Pierrot (band) =

Japanese visual kei rock band

- Also known as: Dizy-Lizy
- Origin: Nagano, Japan
- Genres: Alternative rock; hard rock; gothic rock; industrial rock
- Years active: 1994–2006, 2014, 2017, 2024-present
- Labels: Toshiba-EMI; Mystic Child/Universal
- Spinoffs: Angelo
- Members: Kirito; Jun; Kohta; Takeo; Aiji
- Past members: Hidelow; Luka
- Website: pierrot.jpn.com

Pierrot (stylized as PIERROT) was a Japanese visual kei rock band formed in 1994 in Nagano. After changing their name from Dizy-Lizy to Pierrot and several member changes, the final lineup was completed in 1995 with Kirito on vocals, Jun and Aiji on guitar, Kohta on bass and Takeo on drums. After roughly ten years together, Pierrot disbanded in 2006. Their final single was named "Hello", an apt title for a band who started their major career with an album called Finale.

Vocalist Kirito embarked on a solo career in 2005, before reuniting with Kohta and Takeo to start a new band called Angelo. Aiji officially joined maya, formerly of Ishihara Gundan and Sinners, in LM.C in 2006. Jun joined guitarist Koji (ex-La'cryma Christi) and vocalist Shouta (ex-NIOI) in creating a new band called ALvino sometime in 2006. Pierrot reunited for two shows in 2014, and another two in 2017.

== History ==
In 1994, guitarists Kirito (then going by his real name, Shinya) and Jun formed a rock band named Dizy-Lizy in Nagano. They recruited Hidelow on vocals, Kirito's younger brother Kohta on bass, and Luka on drums. After changing their name to Pierrot, Luka left in November and Takeo joined. Their debut album, Kichigai Pierrot, was released in December, having already been recorded with Luka. Then in February 1995, Hidelow also left the band while Aiji joined, completing the final line up of Kirito on vocals, Jun and Aiji on guitar, Kohta on bass and Takeo on drums. Around this time, future Dir En Grey bassist Toshiya worked for them as a roadie. After releasing their second album Pandora's Box in July, Pierrot signed with Sweet Child Management. This album was named one of the top albums from 1989 to 1998 in a 2004 issue of the music magazine Band Yarouze.

In 1998 they signed to Toshiba-EMI and released their major debut, the single "Clear Sky", which surprisingly reached number 6 on the Oricon music chart. The album Finale was released in July of the following year, and in April they sold out the Nippon Budokan, which was unheard of for a band just making their debut.

Pierrot left Toshiba-EMI and signed with Universal in 2001. In December 2003, they released their best-selling album, the self-cover Dictators Circus: Kijutsuteki Senritsu. Following the release of two compilation albums in 2005, Dictators Circus: A Variant Bud and Dictators Circus: A Deformed Bud, Pierrot announced they were disbanding. They officially disbanded on April 12, 2006, their last release was a single in June 2006, titled "Hello".

Pierrot's song "Kumo no Ito" was covered by Hana Shounen Baddies on the compilation Crush! 2 -90's V-Rock Best Hit Cover Songs-, which was released on November 23, 2011, and features current visual kei bands covering songs from bands that were important to the '90s visual kei movement. "Haruka..." was covered by -Oz- for the similar album Counteraction - V-Rock covered Visual Anime songs Compilation-, which was released on May 23, 2012, and features covers of songs by visual kei bands that were used in anime.

Pierrot announced on April 12, 2014, exactly eight years since their disbandment, that they would reunite for two shows. The concerts were held at the Saitama Super Arena on October 24 and 25. In 2017, Pierrot reunited again to play a two-day performance with Dir En Grey called Androgynos on July 7 and 8 at Yokohama Arena. Seven years later, the two bands are scheduled to play another two-day performance titled Androgynos - The Final War -. They will be held at Yoyogi National Gymnasium's First Gymnasium on October 11 and 12, 2024.

== Members ==
Kirito (キリト)

- Role: vocals/leader (originally guitar)
- Real Name: Shinya Murata
- Birthday: February 24, 1972
- Birthplace: Sapporo, Hokkaido
- Now part of the band Angelo together with Kohta and Takeo, and has his own solo career.

Aiji (アイジ)

- Role: guitar
- Real name: Shinji Mizui
- Birthday: November 17, 1974
- Birthplace: Nagano, Japan
- Now part of the band LM.C with Maya (formerly Miyavi's support guitarist).

Jun (潤)

- Role: guitar/synth guitar
- Real name: Junichi Yamaura
- Birthday: May 4, 1973
- Birthplace: Nagano, Japan
- Now part of the band ALvino with Koji (ex-La'cryma Christi) and Shouta.

Kohta

- Role: bass/chorus
- Real name: Kohta Murata
- Birthday: June 3, 1975
- Birthplace: Sapporo, Hokkaido
- Now part of the band Angelo together with Kirito and Takeo.

Takeo

- Role: drums/percussion
- Real name: Takeo Ishikawa
- Birthday: July 11, 1972
- Birthplace: Koriyama, Fukushima
- Now part of the band Angelo together with Kirito and Kohta.

Former members

- Hidelow – vocals
- Luka – drums
  - Went on to join D≒sire and later Jils, as Hide Hommure -Hideyoshi-.

== Discography ==
=== Studio albums ===
- Kichigai Pierrot (気狂いピエロ, Kichigai Piero; December 24, 1994)
- Pandora's Box (パンドラの匣, Pandora no Hako; July 21, 1996)
- Celluloid (September 3, 1997, mini-album) Oricon Albums Chart Peak Position: 63
- Finale (July 7, 1999) 5
- Private Enemy (November 22, 2000) 14
- Heaven: The Customized Landscape (May 24, 2002) 7
- ID Attack (July 23, 2003) 6
- Freeze (December 1, 2004) 12

=== Singles ===
- "Haken Kreuz" (October 20, 1996)
- "Screen" (April 22, 1998) Oricon Singles Chart Peak Position: 36
- "Clear Sky" (クリア・スカイ; September 10, 1998) 6
- "Mad Sky: Kōtetsu no Kyūseishu" (MAD SKY -鋼鉄の救世主-; December 2, 1998) 5
- "Haruka.../Kanata he" (ハルカ…/カナタヘ…; February 24, 1999) 10
  - 1st ending theme to the Kamikaze Kaito Jeanne anime
- "Last Letter" (ラストレター; April 28, 1999) 5
- "Creatures" (December 22, 1999) 7
- "Agitator" (June 7, 2000) 5
- "Shinkei ga Wareru Atsui Yoru" (神経がワレル暑い夜; September 27, 2000) 10
- "Paradox" (May 6, 2001)
- "Dramatic Neo Anniversary" (August 29, 2001) 5
- "Cocoon" (November 21, 2001) 10
- "Kowarete Iku Ko no Sekaide" (壊れていくこの世界で; March 27, 2002) 5
- Psychedelic Lover" (August 28, 2002) 7
- "Hill: Genkaku no Yuki" (HILL -幻覚の雪-; December 18, 2002) 9
- "Neogrotesque/Barairo no Sekai/Yūyami Suicide" (ネオグロテスク/薔薇色の世界/夕闇スーサイド; June 18, 2003) 4
  - "A Rose-Colored World" was the 2nd opening theme to the Getbackers anime
- "Nōnai Morphine" (脳内モルヒネ; December 3, 2003) 16
- "Smiley Skeleton" (June 30, 2004) 8
- "Mycloud" (October 20, 2004) 7
- "Hello" (June 21, 2006) 8

=== Other albums ===
- Dictators Circus: Kijutsuteki Senritsu (DICTATORS CIRCUS -奇術的旋律-; December 17, 2003, self-cover album) 16
- Dictators Circus: A Variant Bud (April 6, 2005, singles compilation) 6
- Dictators Circus: A Deformed Bud (June 8, 2005, singles' B-side compilation) 15
- Hello Complete Singles and PV Collection (March 2009, 2 CD and 1 DVD compilation)
- Dictators Circus Final (April 1, 2015, live album)

=== Demo tapes ===
- Famme (1994)
- Homme (1994)
- Pierrot (ピエロ, Piero; July 1995)

=== Home videos ===
- Prototype (December 20, 1998)
- "Film" Rising a Mad Sky at Nippon Budokan (September 8, 1999)
- Tour 1999 Foreteller's Mutation Final: The Genome Control (March 15, 2000)
- Dictators Circus V (December 20, 2000)
- Dictators Circus V Vol. 1 (December 20, 2000)
- Dictators Circus V Vol. 2 (December 20, 2000)
- Prototype II (December 20, 2000)
- Prototype III (December 19, 2001) 47
- Prototype I+II (December 19, 2001)
- Tour Paradoxical Genesis "Anniversary" 2001.9.23 Yokohama Arena (April 23, 2003)
- Dictators Circus VI at Saitama Super Arena (April 23, 2003) 86
- Attack [to] the Freedom (2004, fanclub only)
- Dictators Circus VII: A Variant Bud/A Deformed Bud: [Saitama Super Arena] (2005, fanclub only)
- Prototype IV (December 14, 2005) 46
- Dictators Circus Final 2014. 10. 24 - I Said 「Hello」 - Saitama Super Arena (November 25, 2014)
- Dictators Circus Final 2014. 10. 25 - Birthday - Saitama Super Arena (November 25, 2014)
- Androgynos (December 12, 2017, split home video with Dir En Grey)
