= 88 (song) =

- Regular edition cover

Single by LM.C
- Language: Japanese
- B-side: "...with VAMPIRE"
- Released: June 4, 2008
- Length: 7:28
- Label: Pony Canyon

LM.C singles chronology
| "John" (2008) | "88" (2008) | "Punky♥Heart" (2008) |

Music video
- "88" on YouTube

"88" is the eighth single by the Japanese duo LM.C, released on June 4, 2008, by Pony Canyon. It is an opening theme of Katekyo Hitman Reborn! anime and has become one of the duo's most famous songs.

== Background ==
In an interview with Barks, Aiji said that the song had existed since 2002. The reason they hadn't released it sooner was that they were focusing on songs that would work better in live shows. Maya explained that he wrote it shortly after his previous band broke up, with the aim of starting to create his own songs. When the duo was given a second opportunity to create a song for Katekyo Hitman Reborn! (the first was "Boys & Girls"), they decided this would be the best time to release it.

== Promotion and release ==
"88" was performed live for the first time at a concert at Shibuya AX on February 3, 2007. The single's title comes from the number of constellations visible worldwide according to the International Astronomical Union.

The Marui Young Shinjuku Kera Shop Arena and Shinsaibashi Bigstep Kera Shop Arena stores collaborated with LM.C during the release of the single. They released a bandana featuring the duo, and customers who purchased both the single and the bandana received a gift.

== Popularity ==
It reached third position on Oricon Singles Chart and remained on chart for 15 weeks, becoming LM.C's best-selling single.

The Japanese band Eve recorded a cover of "88" for the album Counteraction -V-Rock Covered Visual Anime Songs Compilation, released on May 23, 2012, which pays tribute to songs by visual kei artists that have been used in anime.

== Track listing ==
All lyrics are written by Maya.

| No. | Title | Length |
|---|---|---|
| 1. | "88" | 3:52 |
| 2. | "...with VAMPIRE" | 3:36 |
| Total length: | | 7:28 |

== Personnel ==
- Maya – vocals
- Aiji – guitar
