= 88th Brigade =

88th Brigade may refer to:

- 88th Indian Infantry Brigade, British India
- 88th Reconnaissance and Sabotage Brigade, Russia
- 88th Separate Rifle Brigade, Soviet Union/Korea/China
- 88th Mixed Brigade, Spain
- 88th Brigade (United Kingdom)

== See also ==
- 88th Brigade Support Battalion, United States
- 88th Division (disambiguation)
- 88th Regiment (disambiguation)
