= 88th Regiment of Foot =

Three regiments of the British Army have been numbered the 88th Regiment of Foot:

- 88th Regiment of Foot (Highland Volunteers) (raised 1760), also known as "Campbell's Regiment"
- 88th Regiment of Foot (1779) (raised 1779)
- 88th Regiment of Foot (Connaught Rangers) (raised 1793)
