= Tenka Hashimoto =

Japanese actress and dancer (born 1993)

- 橋本 甜歌
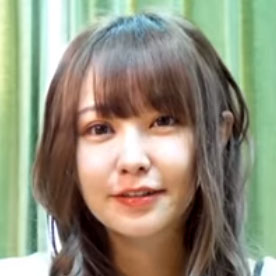
- Hashimoto in 2019
- Born: November 19, 1993 (age 32); Beijing, China
- Other name: Tenchim (former stage name)
- Occupations: Tarento; dancer
- Years active: 2001–2023, 2024–present
- Hometown: Ashikaga, Tochigi, Japan
- Height: 1.66 m (5 ft 5 in)
- Spouse: Yūta Misaki (m. 2026)
- Children: 2

Tenka Hashimoto (橋本 甜歌(はしもと てんか), Hashimoto Tenka; born 19 November 1993) is a Japanese Tarento. Her former stage name was Tenchim (てんちむ, Tenchimu).

== Career ==
In August 2023, she announced that she will take a break indefinitely from entertainment industry at the end of September. Her reason of suspending the activities is unknown. But in April 2024, she resumed her activities, revealing that she is now a single mother as she gave birth to her child.

== Personal life ==
Hashimoto was born on 19 November 1993, in Beijing, China and grew up Ashikaga City, Tochigi Prefecture, Japan. She has one younger brother. Hashimoto was borne to a Japanese father and a Hakka Chinese mother.

On 28 March 2026, she announced that she was married to an entrepreneur and YouTuber Yūta Misaki since 30 January. She announced her pregnancy of second child on 3 August, and gave birth to her second child, a girl on 10 October.

== Filmography ==
=== Variety series ===
Year	Title	Network	Notes
2004	Tensai TV-kun Max	NHK E	TV Senshi
2007	Shakiin!	NHK E	
2010	Real no Bamen	TV Tokyo	
2011	Vanguard Michi	TV Tokyo	
2012	Shibuya Live! The Primeshow	WOWOW Prime	Relay reporter

=== TV drama ===
Year	Title	Role	Network
2004	Damned File		NBN
2007	Kodomo no Jijō	Maki Oda	TBS
2012	The Quiz	Nanami Yanagihara	NTV
2015	Aruhi, Ahirubus	Eri Nemoto	NHK BS Premium

=== Other TV series ===
Year	Title	Network	Notes
2012	Seishun Real	NHK E	10th member

=== Radio series ===
Year	Title	Network
2014	Two Million+	CRT

=== Radio drama ===
Title	Role	Network	Notes	Ref.
Scrap and Build	Ami	FeBe	Lead role	

=== Internet series ===
Year	Title	Role	Website
2010	Girl Talk Tengoku/Panya Nyan		TBS on Demand
2012	Shinikare	Kurumi	NotTV
2013	Nagara Primeshow		Ustream

=== Films ===
Year	Title	Role	Notes	Ref.
2004	Install	Asako Nozawa (young)		
2013	Ted	Gina	Japanese dub	
2014	Recently, My Sister Is Unusual	Mitsuki Kanzaki	Lead role	
2022	xxxHolic	Customer		

=== Stage ===
Year	Title
2003	Romeo and Juliet

=== Advertisements ===
Year	Title	Notes
2001	Takara Kid's Perso Com PuLeLa	
2003	Nintendo Pokémotion	
2003	Calbee potato chips	
2004	Kodansha Nakayoshi	
2010	RecoChoku SoulJa "Hanasanaide yo feat. Thelma Aoyama"	Narration

=== Videos ===
Year	Title	Notes
	Suetaka Tomu: Dajare Dai Jiten 200 Renpatsu! Sueta ka to: Mu	Guest
2003	Shizuka Kudō "Fu-Ji-Tsu"	Music video
2006	Hikōkigumo	
2006	Yomi Kikase Nippon Mukashibanashi Vol. 2	
2010	Juliet "Hull Love 2"	Music video
2010	Kohei Japan with May's "Anogoro ni Modorenai"	Music video
2010	Mihiro "Sayonara no Mae ni"	Music video
2012	Momoyo Fukuda "Dear Best Friend"	Music video
2018	Repezzen Fox "ATM de iikara"	Music video

=== Magazines ===
Year	Title	Notes
2004	Pure2	Volumes 25 to 44
2006	Pichi Lemon	Model, "Onayami Sōdan-shitsu"
2007	Wink Up	"Tenka Hashimoto no Tenka Press"
2010	Nicky	

=== Adult videos ===
Year	Title
2014	Tenka Hashimoto Sweet 19 Song: Eiga Recently, My Sister Is Unusual Yori

== Publications ==
=== Readings ===
Year	Title
2005	Nippon Mukashibanashi –Fairy Stories– Dai 8-kan

=== Books ===
Year	Title
2006	12-sai no Yūjō-ron
2010	Chūgakusei Shikkaku
2019	Watashi, Ikishiteru?
2020	Ren'ai Hakusho

=== Photobooks ===
Year	Title
2005	Jiyugata
2006	Yoshi.
2011	Tenchim DX
2014	Kin'yōbi no Gogo to Watashi
2023	Harenchi
