= Recently, My Sister Is Unusual =

Japanese manga series

- First tankōbon volume cover, featuring Mitsuki Kanzaki

最近、妹のようすがちょっとおかしいんだが。 (Saikin, Imōto no Yōsu ga Chotto Okashiin Da Ga.)
- Genre: Romantic comedy; Supernatural
- Manga
- Written by: Mari Matsuzawa
- Published by: Fujimi Shobo
- Imprint: Dragon Comics Age
- Magazine: Monthly Dragon Age
- Original run: November 9, 2010 – May 9, 2016
- Volumes: 11
- Anime television series
- Directed by: Hiroyuki Hata
- Written by: Hideyuki Kurata
- Music by: Ryosuke Nakanishi
- Studio: Project No.9
- Licensed by: NA: Discotek Media
- Original network: Tokyo MX, Sun TV, AT-X, BS11
- Original run: January 4, 2014 – March 22, 2014
- Episodes: 12
- Light novel
- Written by: Kougetsu Mikazuki
- Illustrated by: Mari Matsuzawa
- Published by: Fujimi Shobo
- Imprint: Fujimi Fantasia Bunko
- Published: January 18, 2014
- Original video animation
- Directed by: Hiroyuki Hata
- Written by: Hideyuki Kurata
- Music by: Ryosuke Nakanishi
- Studio: Project No.9
- Released: June 30, 2014
- Runtime: 24 minutes
- Live-action film
- Directed by: Yuki Aoyama
- Licensed by: NA: Discotek Media
- Released: May 17, 2014

Recently, My Sister is Unusual (最近、妹のようすがちょっとおかしいんだが。, Saikin, Imōto no Yōsu ga Chotto Okashiin Da Ga.; lit. "Lately, My Little Sister's Been Acting A Bit Strange, But."), also known as ImoCho (妹ちょ。), is a Japanese manga series by Mari Matsuzawa, serialized in Fujimi Shobo's Monthly Dragon Age since November 9, 2010. An anime television series premiered in Japan in January 2014. It was adapted into a light novel written by Kougetsu Mikazuki, which was published on January 18, 2014, under Fujimi Shobo's Fujimi Fantasia Bunko imprint. A live action film adaptation premiered on May 17, 2014.

== Plot ==
High school girl Kanzaki Mitsuki "inherits" an older brother when her mother remarries a fellow divorcée with a son. Soon after, her new stepdad is transferred overseas and her mother follows him there, leaving Mitsuki to live alone with her new stepbrother, Yuya. Feeling abandoned by her mother, she stays distant from Yuya, never really getting along very well with him nor even keeping a conversation with him. One day, Mitsuki is visited by an angel/ghost named Hiyori, who takes over her body and makes sexual advances towards Yuya. Hiyori is the lost spirit of a girl who in life loved Yuya deeply, however she died before she could confess her feelings and thus can not reach the gates of heaven and obtain eternal peace.

Wanting to reach heaven, Hiyori puts a chastity belt on Mitsuki that fills up every time Mitsuki has sexual feelings from Yuya, whether it be from simply going on a date with him to kissing and sex. For every time it fills up a little, Hiyori gains a step on a bridge that connects her current situation and the literal gates of heaven. If Mitsuki doesn't help her then it will result in both their deaths, and so if she wants to get rid of the annoying Hiyori, Mitsuki has to make some bold and sexy moves against her own brother, even if he is just a stepbrother. As the series progresses Mitsuki questions if the feelings towards her brother are of true love that goes beyond just brother and sister or if they are a result of Hiyori's feelings towards him.

== Characters ==
=== Main characters ===
Mitsuki Kanzaki (神前 美月, Kanzaki Mitsuki)
Voiced by: Chinami Hashimoto
Played by: Tenka Hashimoto
The main protagonist, Mitsuki is a reserved and calm 15-year old who has been living with her stepbrother Yūya since her mother's second marriage. She initially has a cold view towards Yūya due to a bad relationship with her real father. Mitsuki is possessed and haunted by Hiyori's ghost and forced to help her pass on by helping her experience "lovey-dovey" situations with Yūya. Hiyori tells Mitsuki that the possession caused a chastity belt to appear on her. Each time the heart on the belt fills up, Hiyori is one step closer to reaching the heavenly gate. As the story progresses, Mitsuki remembers that Hiyori was a close childhood friend and rival in love with Yūya. She then learns from Neko that Hiyori is in fact alive (unknowingly) in limbo, and that the chastity belt came from Mitsuki's own locked up feelings. Mitsuki becomes determined to help Hiyori reach the gate which allows her to live rather than to cross-over.
Yūya Kanzaki (神前 夕哉, Kanzaki Yūya)
Voiced by: Junji Majima
Played by: Yukichi Kobayashi
Mitsuki's step-brother. An average Japanese high school student, Yūya's goal is to have a fine sibling relationship with his new little sister. He is generally good-hearted, but because he grew up without a mother and little companionship with females, he has an incredibly poor ability to understand and empathize with Mitsuki's feelings. He also has a tendency to make very inaccurate assumptions based on unusual circumstances, and despite his good intentions, his attempts to help Mitsuki often cause things to become worse, such as when she needed to go to the restroom, and he thought she was sick and forcefully dragged her to the school clinic despite her protests. Due to his misunderstanding about Mitsuki's chastity belt and Hiyori, he believes that Mitsuki and Hiyori are a "lesbian cosplay couple".
Hiyori Kotobuki (寿 日和, Kotobuki Hiyori)
Voiced by: Yui Ogura
Played by: Mayu
Hiyori is a spirit of a dead girl who is possessing/manipulating Mitsuki from time to time. Hiyori has no memories of when she was still alive, only including remembering her own name; the name Hiyori Kotobuki is not her real name. However, she remembers her love for Yūya, to the point of viewing him as her own older brother. Hiyori often pushes Mitsuki to engage in an incestuous relationship with her step-brother even to Mitsuki's extreme protest. Hiyori is also shown to be extremely athletic, displaying great talent in any sport as shown when possessing Mitsuki.
Yukina Kiritani (桐谷 雪那, Kiritani Yukina)
Voiced by: Hisako Kanemoto
Played by: Mika Yano
Yukina is Yūya's childhood friend. When the duo were young, she acts as the older sister to Yūya and is known by him to be quite tomboyish. As a teenager, Yukina grows more feminine and ladylike and develops feelings for Yūya.

=== Other characters ===
Shōtarō Torii (鳥井 正太郎, Torii Shōtarō)
Voiced by: Yasuaki Takumi
Yūya's classmate and best friend, Shōtarō Torii wishes he had the brother-sister incest he fantasizes Yūya could be having with Mitsuki. However, he hardly ever gets along with his own sister, Moa Torii. That aside, he doesn't hesitate to flirt with girls of any age, younger or older, such as with Mitsuki's aunt, Nanami Akesaka.
Neko (根子)
Voiced by: Mikoi Sasaki
The rather quiet, glasses-wearing classmate to Yūya, Neko seems to know about Mitsuki's situation with Hiyori. She also has been in a position to help push the brother-sister relationship along, such as providing tickets for everyone to a water park owned by her father. In reality, it is quite possible Neko is directly involved in Mitsuki's and Hiyori's situation with the chastity belt, such as an agent of Heaven, as suggested by the anime's opening video.
At the same time, when Neko herself ends up a part of such situations, such as at the hot springs inn vacation, she refrains from showing off way too much skin, so she wears a one piece swimsuit to the bath.
Ayaka Tachibana (橘 彩花, Tachibana Ayaka)
Voiced by: Manami Tanaka
Played by: Kazue Akita
She is Mitsuki's classmate and shown as a good friend of her.
Nanami Akesaka (明坂 七海, Akesaka Nanami)
Voiced by: Kumi Sakuma
Mitsuki's aunt, and a bit of a drinker, Nanami is charged with checking in on Yūya and Mitsuki while their parents are away.
Moa Torii (鳥井 萌亜, Torii Moa)
Voiced by: Aimi Terakawa
Moa is Shotaro's younger sister in middle school student. She and her brother barely get along, which makes Moa often wish she had a nicer older brother, like Yūya is to Mitsuki. While arguing with her brother, Moa often uses the insult "Bald"/"Baldy".

== Media ==
=== Manga ===
The manga was published from November 9, 2010, to May 9, 2016, and was released in eleven tankōbon volumes.

No.	Release date	ISBN
1	August 9, 2011	978-4-04-712742-5
2	January 7, 2012	978-4-04-712774-6
3	June 28, 2012	978-4-04-712805-7
4	December 7, 2012	978-4-04-712843-9
5	June 8, 2013	978-4-04-712878-1
6	January 9, 2014	978-4-04-712995-5
7	July 8, 2014	978-4-04-070255-1
8	February 6, 2015	978-4-040-70501-9
9	July 8, 2015	978-4-04-070633-7
10	January 9, 2016	978-4-04-070801-0
11	July 9, 2016	978-4-04-070953-6

=== Anime ===
An anime television series adaptation premiered on Tokyo MX and Sun TV on January 4, 2014. Additionally, the series is airing on AT-X and BS11 and streamed with English subtitles by Crunchyroll. The anime is directed by Hiroyuki Hata at studio Project No.9 with writing by Hideyuki Kurata and music by Ryosuke Nakanishi. An original episode will be released on Blu-ray Disc bundled with the limited edition of the seventh manga volume, was published on April 30, 2014. An OVA episode was also made, but due to its content it was deemed "too risqué" for television broadcast. Rather than airing it, the episode was only released through the seventh manga volume as a bonus item. The anime has been licensed by Crunchyroll with distribution by Discotek Media, and they've released the series on DVD July 28, 2015.

The show has become subject to a broadcast decency investigation in Japan by the Broadcasting Ethics and Program Improvement Organization, following concerns of sexually explicit themes which do not match the show's television airing time slot on Tokyo MX and Sun TV.

=== Live action film ===
On May 7, 2014, a live action version of Recently, My Sister Is Unusual opened in theatres in Japan. It was directed by Yuuki Aoyama and Kouen Igii, and starred Tenka Hashimoto as Mitsuki, Yuuichi Kobayashi as Yuya and Mayu Mitsui as Hiyori. The screenplay was written by Kouen Igii and Takehiko Minato. It was produced by Kadokawa Pictures and Pony Canyon, and distributed by Kadokawa Pictures.

== Reception ==
Tim Jones and Nicole MacLean of Them Anime Reviews gave the series an overall rating of one star, criticizing the character Hiyori, the lack of character development for the characters, and the series' ending. The reviewers concluded: "we almost gave it two stars because of some well-developed backstory at times and the occasional cute scene, but overall the terrible first half and Hiyori drown out all the possible good this series has." Anime News Network's Theron Martin gave the series an overall rating of C, concluding that the series "is not a total disaster, but it stacks the deck strongly enough against itself that it stands in the lower echelons of otaku-oriented fan service titles. What little it has going for it is maddeningly short on elaboration, and the tepid end of the series suggests that at least another season will be required to get any real answers."
