= Plastic Memories =

Japanese anime television series and franchise

- Cover art of the first DVD volume of Plastic Memories released by Aniplex, featuring main character Isla.

プラスティック・メモリーズ (Purasutikku Memorīzu)
- Genre: Comedy drama, romance, science fiction
- Anime television series
- Directed by: Yoshiyuki Fujiwara
- Written by: Naotaka Hayashi
- Music by: Masaru Yokoyama
- Studio: Doga Kobo
- Licensed by: AUS: Hanabee; NA: Aniplex of America; UK: Anime Limited
- Original network: AT-X, Tokyo MX, GYT, GTV, ABC, GBS, MTV, BS11
- Original run: April 5, 2015 – June 28, 2015
- Episodes: 13
- Manga

Plastic Memories: Say to Good-bye
- Written by: Naotaka Hayashi
- Illustrated by: Yūyū
- Published by: ASCII Media Works
- Magazine: Dengeki G's Comic
- Original run: June 2015 – July 2016
- Volumes: 3
- Video game
- Developer: 5pb.
- Publisher: 5pb.
- Genre: Visual novel
- Platform: PlayStation Vita
- Released: JP: October 13, 2016
- icon

Plastic Memories (プラスティック・メモリーズ, Purasutikku Memorīzu) is a Japanese anime television series conceived and written by Naotaka Hayashi, produced by Doga Kobo. The work is original character designs by Okiura, music by Masaru Yokoyama, directed by Yoshiyuki Fujiwara. The series aired in Japan between April 5 and June 28, 2015.

== Plot ==
Plastic Memories takes place in a futuristic city, modeled after Singapore, where which humans live alongside androids that look exactly like humans and have human emotion and memory. SAI Corp, the leading android production company, has introduced the Giftia, an advanced android model with the most human-like qualities of any model. However, there is a catch. The lifespan of a Giftia is determined beforehand, and a Giftia can only live for a maximum of 81,920 hours (roughly nine years and four months). If they pass their expiration date, it causes personality disintegration, memory loss, and outbreaks of violence; those who experience this are known as wanderers. Wanderers only act on instinct and can no longer recognize their owners. As a result, the Terminal Services are established with the duty of retrieving Giftias who are close to the end of their lifespans from their owners, and erasing the Giftias' memories. To perform this job, the Terminal Service employees work in teams consisting of a human (known as a "spotter") and a Giftia (known as a "marksman"). The story follows the work and life of such a team in SAI Corp's Terminal Service One office, consisting of the male (and human) protagonist, Tsukasa Mizugaki and a Giftia named Isla. Their relationship progresses, and as they both slowly fall in love, Isla is revealed to be nearing the end of her own lifespan.

== Characters ==
=== Terminal Service One ===
Tsukasa Mizugaki (水柿 ツカサ, Mizugaki Tsukasa)
Voiced by: Yasuaki Takumi
Tsukasa is the 18-year-old male protagonist. After failing his college entrance exams due to medical problems, he eventually gets a job through his father on Terminal Service One, although he initially does not know what they do. He is assigned as Isla's spotter and soon becomes attached to her, unaware that she is at the end of her lifespan. When he finally finds out, he refuses to abandon Isla and continues to be her partner. He has developed feelings for Isla ever since their first encounter, but only realizes it during their partnership.
Isla (アイラ, Aira)
Voiced by: Sora Amamiya
Isla is a Giftia who is a beautiful young girl with long silver hair tied into twintails. She has a tendency to trip and fall on objects, and causes those around her to feel the fleetingness of life. She is said to be a veteran at the department and was once partnered with Kazuki as her marksman. After that, all she does is serve tea at SAI Corp, until Tsukasa arrives, to which she becomes his marksman and is put back in the field again, despite having less than 2,000 hours until the end of her lifespan. She eventually develops feelings for Tsukasa.
Michiru Kinushima (絹島 ミチル, Kinushima Michiru)
Voiced by: Chinatsu Akasaki
A 17-year-old employee who works at SAI Terminal Service One and is Tsukasa's superior by one year. She seems to be developing feelings for Tsukasa, but refuses to admit it. She was raised by a Giftia, so she empathizes with the "android children", people who were raised by Giftia or other androids. She had tried to protect her guardian from being retrieved, resulting in him becoming a "Wanderer", and he was later shot down by members of the private security firm R. Security, resulting in her longstanding hatred of them. This experience has since resulted in her joining Terminal Service One.
Zack (ザック, Zakku)
Voiced by: Sayuri Yahagi
A Giftia with the appearance of a high-class young boy. He is Michiru's marksman. He loves to tease people around him and reveal their innermost secrets.
Kazuki Kuwanomi (桑乃実 カヅキ, Kuwanomi Kazuki)
Voiced by: Megumi Toyoguchi
Tsukasa's boss at SAI Terminal Service One. She was once Isla's spotter and is highly protective of her former partner, being downright scary to her coworkers. She seems to prone to drinking alcohol, and has an amputated leg that was the result of an attempt to retrieve Michiru's father three years ago.
Constance (コンスタンス, Konsutansu)
Voiced by: Satoshi Hino
A Giftia who works at SAI Terminal Service One. He is Kazuki's current marksman and is known for his gentle personality.
Yasutaka Hanada (縹 ヤスタカ, Hanada Yasutaka)
Voiced by: Kenjiro Tsuda
A veteran employee at SAI Terminal Service One, where he has been working for ten years. He has a casual attitude and a lack of motivation, which is unusual for someone with his experience at the Terminal Service.
Sherry (シェリー, Sherī)
Voiced by: Aimi
A Giftia who is Yasutaka's marksman. She has a serious personality and the appearance of a career woman. She tends to get annoyed at her partner's attitude and that he sometimes skips work. When angered, she can be as scary as Kazuki.
Ren Kawarake (土器 レン, Kawarake Ren)
Voiced by: Shinnosuke Ogami
An employee at Terminal Service One. He is described by Zack as a "pencil pusher".
Eru Miru (海松 エル, Miru Eru)
Voiced by: Sumire Uesaka
An engineer in the Giftia maintenance team, who has been on the job for only two years. She is also an "android geek" who particularly dotes on Isla. Her friend, a Giftia named Olivia, was retrieved years ago, but had her operating system (OS) replaced and is now living a new life as Terminal Service No. 3 marksman Andie, much to Eru's initial dismay.
Takao Yamanobe (山野辺 タカオ, Yamanobe Takao)
Voiced by: Nobuo Tobita
The section manager of SAI Terminal Service One. He originally had a job in sales, and as a result, he doesn't have any actual field experience with his current job. He seems to have trouble communicating with his daughter.
Mikijiro Tetsuguro (鉄黒 ミキジロウ, Tetsuguro Mikijirō)
Voiced by: Mitsuaki Hoshino
Eru's supervisor and the head of the Unit Testing Room, which is designed to measure the physical skills of a Giftia.

=== Other characters ===
Chizu Shirohana (白花 チヅ, Shirohana Chizu)
Voiced by: Reiko Suzuki
A stern elderly woman who was raising Nina, a Giftia, as her surrogate granddaughter.
Nina (ニーナ)
Voiced by: Misaki Kuno
A Giftia raised by Chizu.
Souta Wakanae (若苗 ソウタ, Wakanae Sōta)
Voiced by: Misato Fukuen
A young "android child" who was raised by Marcia, his family's Giftia. He is initially distrustful towards Giftias due to Marcia's impending retrieval and is willing to let Marcia go, but regains his love for her at the prodding of Tsukasa, Isla, and Michiru.
Marcia (マーシャ)
Voiced by: Mamiko Noto
A Giftia who has raised Souta in the role of an older sister.
Shinonome (東雲)
Voiced by: Kenta Miyake
A unit supervisor for R. Security, tasked with hunting down Giftias who turn into Wanderers after passing their expiration dates.
Andie (アンディ)
Voiced by: Mikako Komatsu
A marksman from the Terminal Service No. 3 office. She was once Olivia, a neighbor and friend of Eru's, but was retrieved by the Terminal Service. However, due to budget cuts, her OS was instead replaced and she was recycled under her current name.
Antonio Horizon (アントニオ・ホリゾン)
Voiced by: Hiroshi Naka
A mafia boss who owned Sarah and had her serve as his bodyguard. Coming to care for Sarah, he realized that his lifestyle was preventing her from living a normal life and sought to find a playmate for her.
Sarah (サラ)
Voiced by: Ayahi Takagaki
A Giftia who was employed by Antonio as his bodyguard for years. The two became close and she also took on the role of Antonio's surrogate granddaughter.

== Media ==
=== Anime ===
The 13-episode anime television series is produced by Doga Kobo and is directed by Yoshiyuki Fujiwara. The series was created and written by Naotaka Hayashi, and the music is produced by Mages. Okiura provides original character designs, which were later adapted by Chiaki Nakajima for the anime, while the backgrounds are made by Atelier Rourke 07, Gachi Production, and Nara Animation. The series aired from April 5 to June 28, 2015, on Tokyo MX. It aired on later dates on GYT, GTV, ABC, GBS, MTV, BS11, and AT-X. It also started broadcasting online on Niconico starting April 9, 2015. The opening theme is "Ring of Fortune" by Eri Sasaki and the ending theme is "Asayake no Starmine" (朝焼けのスターマイン; lit. 'Starmine of a Morning Glow') by Asami Imai. The first and seventh episodes feature the insert song "Again & Again" by Melody Chubak. The eighth episode uses "Ring of Fortune" as the ending theme instead of the opening theme. The tenth episode features an insert song sung by Isla's voice actress Sora Amamiya, titled "Suki nano de." (好きなので。; lit. 'I Love You.').

Aniplex of America licensed the series and it was streamed on Aniplex Channel, Crunchyroll, Hulu and Daisuki. Funimation previously streamed the series in United States and Canada with subtitles.

==== Episode list ====
No.	Title	Original release date
1	"The First Partner" "Hajimete no Pātonā" (はじめてのパートナー)	April 5, 2015
On the first day of his new job, Tsukasa Mizugaki rushes to Terminal Service No. 1, which is one of the offices in SAI Corp, where he is taught about Giftia, androids who survive on synthetic souls for a maximum lifespan of nine years and four months. Tsukasa is partnered with Isla, a Giftia who is highly regarded in the office and famous for a wide knowledge of herbs and tea. The two are led out by Tsukasa's trainer Michiru Kinushima and her partner Zack; Zack retrieves a Giftia, as a demonstration of their job for Tsukasa, and Michiru explains their job to him. Not long after, Tsukasa and Isla are assigned a mission to retrieve Nina, a child-type Giftia owned by an old woman named Chizu Shirohana. After multiple tries, Isla is unable to persuade Chizu to talk to them, which makes Tsukasa doubt her abilities. She finally manages to win a chance to talk with Nina, and Chizu overhears Nina giving her consent to be taken away so as not to cause trouble for Chizu, whom she loves dearly. Chizu, realising she had not considered Nina's feelings in the matter, finally allows Nina to be taken away, and thanks Tsukasa when he apologizes.
2	"Don't Want to Cause Trouble" "Ashi o Hipparitakunai node" (足を引っ張りたくないので)	April 12, 2015
Tsukasa meets Yasutaka Hanada, a spotter and a ten-year veteran at Terminal Service No. 1, whose aloof behavior surprises him, as well as annoys his partner Sherry. When Yasutaka asks him about how he got the job, Tsukasa reveals that his father is a friend of one of the higher-ups in the company, who decided to help him after he failed his entrance exams. After another failed attempt at retrieving and a scolding from Michiru, Tsukasa takes the blame despite it being Isla who caused the problem. Back in the office, he is prompted by a message about her and heads to the Unit Testing Room, where he meets Eru Miru and Mikijiro Tetsuguro, who are measuring Isla's physical skills. Tsukasa asks Isla about the physical training, and she tells him of her belief that she is holding him back because of all the time she spent off the field. Because of this, Tsukasa decides to do the negotiating with Giftia owners instead of Isla, in spite of the fact that it isn't what a spotter does. The next day, he begins putting together his own manual about owner negotiations and is assisted by Michiru and Zack. Once he is finished, he comes across Yasutaka, who learns about Isla's visits to the Unit Testing Room and remarks the pointless nature of those visits, explaining that Isla's physical capabilities are on a consistent decline that cannot be fixed, a characteristic of Giftia. Later on, Tsukasa and Isla successfully retrieve the Giftia they were previously assigned to, while Kazuki Kuwanomi, an experienced spotter, and Yasutaka talk about Isla's lifespan, which is set to expire in less than 2,000 hours, giving her less than three months to live.
3	"We've Just Started Living Together" "Dōsei Hajimemashita" (同棲はじめました)	April 19, 2015
Tsukasa is assigned to live with Isla in the company dormitory, a rule mandated for all marksmen and spotter duos in Terminal Service No. 1. However, he is unsettled by the fact that Isla repeatedly ignores him there. At Terminal Service No. 1, he confides to other employees about the problem, although their individual suggestions fail miserably at helping him attract her attention. Finally, Kazuki approaches Tsukasa about the problem and tells him she ignores other people during her personal time, not just him. She then tells him to take Isla out somewhere if he wants some interaction with her. Following through with the suggestion, he successfully asks Isla to accompany him to a shopping mall. There, they go to a herb shop and, to buy some more time, Tsukasa asks Isla to help him pick out some herbs as a present to a person who he unintentionally describes as being a lot like her. Afterwards, they go to a nearby amusement park, where Tsukasa admits the person he was describing was Isla herself. When he says he did this to make some memories with her about their partnership, she emotionally shuts down and tells him that she was not built to play at an amusement park, which shocks him. When Isla runs off, he purchases a key ring pendant from the amusement park and gives it to her at their dorm room, telling her she can throw it away if she doesn't want it. She also apologizes apprehensively about her escape, and even though Eru had previously told Tsukasa that Isla didn't accept gifts, Isla makes the keychain an exception.
4	"I Just Don't Know How to Smile" "Umaku Waraenakute" (うまく笑えなくて)	April 26, 2015
The Terminal Service No. 1 staff receives seven brand-new retrieval missions, and Tsukasa and Isla are assigned to retrieve a Giftia named Marcia. They are also warned of the presence of criminals who assume the identities of Terminal Service employees to retrieve Giftia and sell them on the black market. Tsukasa and Isla head to Marcia's residence, where they learn she is raising her owner, Souta Wakanae, in the role of an older sister after his parents died. When Souta arrives home from school, he acts hostile towards Tsukasa and Isla, but is surprisingly willing to sign the agreement form to take Marcia away, citing that she is just a Giftia and adding that Giftias cannot be trusted in telling the truth. Unable to acquire a signature as a result of Souta's attitude, Tsukasa confides in Michiru about the encounter, and she advises him to solve the problem by having Souta believe he was truly loved by Marcia. As a result, Tsukasa, Isla, and Marcia decide to bake a cake for his birthday on the following day, and are assisted by Michiru and Zack. Afterwards, Michiru tells Tsukasa that she tried all she could to keep her father, a Giftia, from being retrieved, which resulted in him becoming a Wanderer, a Giftia that still retains its motor skills but loses its personality and memories, causing it to become instinctual and aggressive. Later, Souta returns home and is surprised by the group. Upon spotting the birthday cake, which was modeled after one used for his birthday three years ago, he remembers his family and tearfully apologises to Marcia. On the day before the retrieval, Souta is visited by a shady man, who claims to be Tsukasa and Isla's replacement from the Terminal Service and asks for Marcia.
5	"The Promise I Wanted to Keep" "Mamoritakatta Yakusoku" (守りたかった約束)	May 3, 2015
While returning home with groceries, Marcia is suddenly ambushed by the man from the previous episode. Later, Tsukasa and Isla are contacted by Souta, who informs them about Marcia's disappearance, and they assume it is the work of a black market retriever. With only 24 hours left on Marcia's lifespan, Tsukasa resolves to retrieve Marcia and return her to Souta, and the rest of Terminal Service No. 1 joins the search. The following day, the office narrows down the search to an area where a black market retrieval service is possibly located, although their efforts are hindered by a unit from R. Security, a private security firm that was hired to assist in the investigation. Kazuki confronts the unit's supervisor, Shinonome, who gives her a map of the area under scrutiny. As the retrievers get ready to converge on the area, Tsukasa is equipped with and learns about a gun-like device designed to forcibly crash all of a Giftia's functions when they turn into Wanderers. He is then approached by Kazuki, who asks him if Isla will be able to handle the situation, but is forced to drop the subject soon afterward. Michiru later tells Tsukasa about how Kazuki tried to retrieve her father when he became a Wanderer, only for him to injure Kazuki and then be shot down by members of R. Security. Soon afterward, the black market retriever is found unconscious and it is concluded that Marcia turned into a Wanderer. Kazuki orders the rest of the retrievers to stop Marcia before she is destroyed by R. Security. Tsukasa and Isla find Marcia, only to realize Souta had been following them. Marcia then injures Isla and kidnaps Souta. Despite Isla's injuries, she and Tsukasa follow her to a rooftop, where Tsukasa nearly manages to convince Marcia to surrender. However, when Souta speaks her name, Marcia snaps and begins strangling him, forcing Tsukasa to pull out his software destruction device and prepare to shoot Marcia. However, Isla suddenly dashes towards Marcia, just as Tsukasa fires the device. The scene then cuts to the Terminal Service office during the next morning, where it is revealed that Isla hasn't signed into the attendance log.
6	"Welcome Home the Both of Us" "Futari de, Okaeri" (2人で、おかえり)	May 10, 2015
Three years ago, it is revealed that Isla began blaming herself for not accompanying Kazuki when she retrieved Michiru's father, which wound up costing Kazuki her ankle. As a result, Kazuki retired from her position as Isla's spotter. In the present day, it is revealed that Marcia was hit by Tsukasa's device, although Isla was able to block most of the blow without being hit herself. With Isla now under maintenance for her injuries inflicted by Marcia, Tsukasa is reassigned to desk duty. After a visit from Tsukasa, Isla notes that he is still remaining optimistic despite what happened and privately questions his feelings about the situation. Once most of her maintenance is done, Isla returns to the office and realizes that she has been paying attention to Tsukasa a lot more closely lately. She confides in Michiru and Eru about it, although they misinterpret her feelings as being motivated by love and Eru decides to help Isla stalk Tsukasa. However, after multiple attempts at observing him fail miserably, Isla confesses to Michiru about her confusion on Tsukasa's unwavering optimism. Michiru then tells her that Tsukasa never forgot about the incident with Marcia, even neglecting his desk duties to go and apologize to Souta for what happened, and assumes that he is smiling out of sadness. After finishing the last of her maintenance, Isla returns to the dorm, only to find he isn't there. When night falls and Tsukasa has yet to return home, she goes to the office, where she finds Tsukasa learning that she has 1,000 hours left in her lifespan, which translates to a month. However, when given the chance to partner up with a new Giftia, Tsukasa declares that he wants to remain partnered with Isla, which makes her happy.
7	"How to Ask Her Out" "Jōzuna dēto no sasoi-kata" (上手なデートの誘い方)	May 17, 2015
One morning, Tsukasa decides to ask Isla out on a date. While trying to find opportunities to do so, he finds that Isla has been doing chores for him at their dormitory and the office. After asking her about it, he learns she is trying to be useful to him, much to his chagrin. When Tsukasa musters the courage to ask her out, Isla accepts his request and decides to go to the amusement park after discussing it with Michiru and Eru, later reasoning to Tsukasa that she felt guilty about running out on him during their previous time there. However, while reading Isla's diary, Tsukasa realizes that she and Kazuki often went there when they were still partners. The next day, the two of them go there and sit at a bench, Isla's favorite spot in the park, as she was able to observe the happiness and joy of so many people, which comforted her. After learning that Isla has never tried any of the park attractions, Tsukasa takes her on a tour through the entire area, eventually ending at the Ferris wheel. As they sit inside, Isla expresses her gratitude that she is riding it with Tsukasa. As he thinks about Isla's happiness, Tsukasa faints after working too hard lately, ending the date. In the end, Tsukasa wakes up and Isla apologizes for not telling him earlier that she has 1,000 hours remaining in her lifespan. Tsukasa promises that he will stay with Isla until the end, no matter what. He then asks if she would be willing to go out with him again, to which she smiles and takes his hand. However, as he sleeps, she observes him with a doubtful expression.
8	"The Fireworks I've Never Seen" "Shiranai hanabi" (知らない花火)	May 24, 2015
During a retrieval mission, Tsukasa is surprised when the owner of the newly assigned Giftia opts to delete the latter's current personality and memories by replacing her OS and start over from scratch instead of handing over the Giftia proper, having done it several times already. Intrigued, he asks around the office if a Giftia who has gone through that experience is capable of retaining their old memories, but everyone replies there is no precedent to that. Later on, Kazuki announces that a marksman from the Terminal Service No. 3 office will be sent in, as the assigned Giftia and his owner have gone into hiding, and assigns Tsukasa and Isla to assist her. They later meet the marksman, Andie; shortly afterward, they have an awkward encounter with Eru, who mistakes Andie for her friend Olivia. After the mission is a success, Tsukasa learns from Eru that Andie is indeed Olivia, whose OS was replaced due to the company cutting costs. Later on, Eru tells Tsukasa that she reconnected with Andie and mentioned a carnival they used to go to together when Andie was still Olivia, which caused Andie to decide to go there. Not wanting to deal with her memories of Olivia, Eru tries to get Tsukasa to take Andie to the carnival instead. However, Tsukasa convinces Eru to come along, and they take Isla and Andie to the carnival the following night. There, Eru decides to let go of Olivia and create new memories with Andie, concluding it wouldn't be fair to either of them if she saw them as one and the same. Later, Isla gets lost in the crowd and Tsukasa begins searching for her, eventually finding her at a lonely walkway, terrified by exploding fireworks. After he consoles her, Isla brings up Andie and asks if her presence is hurting him. He replies that it does, but insists on continuing to be her partner. When she asks why, Tsukasa responds that it is because he loves her. Shocked and embarrassed by the sudden confession, Isla shouts that she cannot accept his love.
9	"After the Festival" "Matsuri no ato" (祭りの後)	June 1, 2015
In the wake of being shot down by Isla at the carnival, Tsukasa has maintained a heartbroken, depressed attitude that is evident at the office. Seeing this, Michiru asks Isla about it, and she tells her that she was just confused when she shot Tsukasa down and now feels guilty about hurting his feelings. Michiru suggests having the two of them live apart for a few days so Isla could have time to sort out her own feelings, and she transfers Isla to Eru's room and Tsukasa to hers and Zack's. When Tsukasa recovers from his stupor, Michiru consoles him and tells him the reason why she joined Terminal Service No. 1. The next day, Michiru sets up a lunch between Tsukasa and Isla, during which they agree to allow Isla more time to consider her true feelings. Later on, Michiru questions the effectiveness of her treatment over the whole situation. After observing Tsukasa and Isla acting like average coworkers at the office, Michiru approaches Isla one day and asks her about her feelings for Tsukasa, and she responds after a lengthy explanation that she does return his feelings. However, she concludes from this that she must stay away from Tsukasa. When a shocked Michiru asks why, Isla confesses to her that she has approximately one month left in her lifespan. Angered by this, Michiru confronts Tsukasa about it and asks for his true intention for confessing to Isla when he knew about her lifespan beforehand; he replies that he only wishes to make memories for the both of them. When she lashes out at him for refusing to see what kind of pain will result from his decisions, he insists on keeping Isla as a partner. When he returns to his dorm room, Tsukasa finds Kazuki already there. As Isla also arrives, Kazuki announces she intends to dissolve their partnership.
10	"No Longer Partners" "Mō, pātonā janai" (もう、パートナーじゃない)	June 7, 2015
Kazuki elaborates that she is dissolving Tsukasa and Isla's partnership on the basis that romantic relationships in the office are not allowed, and intends to reassign Tsukasa to her marksman Constance while she takes charge of Isla. Though Tsukasa protests against the decision, Isla immediately agrees, later explaining that it would be better for the both of them. At the office, Tsukasa confronts Kazuki about her decision, after which she reveals she only did it to protect them both from the inevitable pain that would've resulted. However, when Tsukasa proclaims he still intends on staying as Isla's spotter, Kazuki cryptically tells him to leave the situation to her. Later on, Tsukasa and Isla go out on separate retrieval missions with Constance and Kazuki, respectively. During her retrieval mission, Isla agrees to befriend Sarah, the Giftia in question, at the request of the owner Antonio Horizon, whose lifestyle as a mafia boss made it impossible for the Giftia to live a normal life. Simultaneously, Tsukasa and Constance talk about Isla's work performance and how she had closed herself off after Kazuki dissolved their partnership three years ago. Constance then tells Tsukasa that Kazuki has faith in entrusting him with Isla. Returning to the office, Kazuki reveals to Isla that she intentionally set her up for the mission and tries to convince her to stay with Tsukasa, saying that tearing herself away from him will only create painful memories for him. The following night, Isla muses about the unfulfilled expectations she had from her separation with Kazuki. The next day, she returns to the office, approaches Tsukasa, and explains her reason for rejecting him. Then, she proclaims that she wants to make more memories with him until the end and that she is in love with him.
11	"Rice Omelette Day" "Omuraisu no hi" (オムライスの日)	June 14, 2015
In the wake of starting their relationship, Tsukasa and Isla have found it difficult to talk to one another without being embarrassed. However, Tsukasa is able to ask Isla out to dinner. At the office, their approving colleagues decide to give them advice on how to appease the other. At Kazuki's suggestion, Isla asks Michiru to help her learn how to cook for Tsukasa. However, upon finding out she doesn't know any of Tsukasa's favorite foods, Isla asks him, only for Constance to suggest that the two of them just cook together. After debating on what to cook for dinner, Tsukasa suggests rice omelettes. Later on, the two travel to Antonio's manor to visit Sarah. There, Tsukasa asks Sarah what would make her happy, and she recites a sentence Isla told her during her last visit, that people are at their happiest when they are with the ones they love. Afterwards, they go to the shopping mall to purchase herbs and pajamas for Isla, after which Tsukasa admits he doesn't know what to do to make her happy. She responds that she is already happy spending time with him. Returning home, the two begin cooking rice omelettes, and although the final product was not what they were expecting, they are able to enjoy it nevertheless. Isla then allows Tsukasa to read her latest diary entries, both of which recount the days she spent with him. When Tsukasa goes to sleep, Isla adds a new entry, in which she expresses her hope that she would be able to spend another wonderful day with him.
12	"Filling Up with Memories" "Omoide ga umatte kimasu" (想い出が埋まってく)	June 21, 2015
In the middle of the night, Isla breaks down in tears and sleeps in Tsukasa's bed for comfort. The next morning, she has reverted to a bright and cheery personality, much to Tsukasa's surprise and relief. At the office, the other employees give Tsukasa tickets to a number of events that he could take Isla to. The two then use tickets given to them by Michiru and Zack to watch a romantic movie. The next day, they return to work despite having taken that day off. Following Isla's visit to the Unit Testing Room, Michiru and Eru discuss about the necessity of her increasingly frequent visits. Meanwhile, Kazuki approaches Tsukasa in private and gives him a retrieval agreement form for Isla, telling him to sign it. Overhearing their conversation, Isla decides to begin teaching Tsukasa how to raise the herbs she had been cultivating in her spare time, as well as how to make tea. While serving Michiru tea, Tsukasa is confronted by her about why he and Isla are coming to work despite taking the day off, and he responds that it was a part of their decision to carry on as they were. The following night, Tsukasa gives Isla the retrieval agreement form, and she gives him her approval in signing it. The next day, they go to retrieve Sarah, their last retrieval mission together. Before erasing Sarah's memories, Isla whispers something indiscernible to her. They then return to the office, where they find the others holding a party in commemoration for Isla's last retrieval mission. After the party, Tsukasa asks Isla what she told Sarah, and she replies that she told her of her hope that she would be reunited with the person they cherished.
13	"I Hope One Day, You'll Be Reunited" "Itsuka mata meguriaemasu yō ni" (いつかまた巡り会えますように)	June 28, 2015
It is the last day of Isla's lifespan and she and Tsukasa decide to first spend it by reading entries in her diary. They then spend the morning cleaning up their dormitory room and then taking a bath. They then head over to the office, where they take care of Isla's herbs and she leaves notes for the other employees. They are approached by an early Kazuki, who teases Isla for one last time. The two then decide to spend the day's remaining hours at the amusement park, which they enjoy to their hearts' content. Eventually, they stand at Isla's favorite bench, where she describes how she always observed the emotions of the park's many visitors and how contented they would be at the end of the day in bringing their happy memories home with them. Then, as the park closes, Tsukasa and Isla convince the operator to let them ride the Ferris wheel one last time after closing hours. There, they take turns describing what they love about each other, and Isla finally admits she loved the way Tsukasa held back his sadness and smiled, despite her worry over that characteristic. She then hands him her deactivation ring, saying that she wanted him to be the one to do it. Tsukasa begins crying, and Isla notes that it was the first time she ever saw him cry. He then puts the ring on, expresses his hope that she would be reunited with the person they cherished, and kisses Isla as her time expires. As he carries her to the vehicle, he is met by Kazuki, who thanks him for being there for her, which causes him to break down in tears. The other Terminal Service employees read Isla's letters, in which she thanks them for all the memories she had of them. In the epilogue, Tsukasa takes the same elevator where he met Isla and muses what it would be like if his lifespan was predetermined, concluding afterward that he would live that life to the fullest. Nine months later, he returns from a training course to resume work with Terminal Service No. 1, and is introduced to his new Giftia.

=== Manga ===
A spin-off manga adaptation, illustrated by Yūyū and titled Plastic Memories: Say to Good-bye (プラスティック・メモリーズ Say to good-bye), features Michiru Kinushima as the protagonist. It began serialization in the June 2015 issue of ASCII Media Works' Dengeki G's Comic. The first tankōbon volume, which contains chapters published before the serialization, was published on April 27, 2015.

==== Volume list ====
No.	Release date	ISBN
1	April 27, 2015	978-4-04-865084-7
2	November 27, 2015	978-4-04-865529-3
3	September 27, 2016	978-4-04-892167-1

=== Video game ===
A video game adaptation developed by 5pb. for the PlayStation Vita was released in Japan on October 13, 2016.
