= Coll:set =

[Coll:set]

Studio album by D'espairsRay
- Released: June 29, 2005
- Studio: Power House Studio; Studio Mix 355; Green Bird Recording Studio; Tower Side Studio; Alive Recording Studio; Magnet Studio; Sunrise Studio; Maruni Studio
- Genre: Industrial metal; nu metal
- Length: 64:06
- Label: Sweet-Heart/UMG, Gan-Shin/UMG
- Producer: D'espairsRay, Shinobu Narita, Toshihiro Nara

D'espairsRay chronology
Born (2004)	[Coll:set] (2005)	Mirror (2007)

Singles from [Coll:Set]
- 1. "Garnet" Released: November 12, 2003; 2. "Gemini" Released: September 1, 2004

Professional ratings
Review scores
Source	Rating
Rock Hard	7/10 stars

Collset (stylized as [Coll:set]) is the first full-length album by D'espairsRay, released on June 29, 2005. Along with new recordings, it also features two remixes of previously released songs. The first press limited edition comes housed in a special slipcase and a photo booklet titled '[The World in a Cage].' This booklet also contains lyrics to the song. The tracks on the limited press are also arranged differently from the normal release.

== Track listing ==
Disc one
No.	Title	Lyrics	Music	Length
1.	"Infection"	Hizumi	Karyu	4:10
2.	"Dears"	Hizumi	Karyu	3:51
3.	"In Vain"	Karyu	Karyu	4:15
4.	"Grudge"	Hizumi	Karyu, Tsukasa	3:54
5.	"Tsuki no Kioku -Fallen-" (月の記憶 -fallen-)	Karyu	Karyu	5:19
6.	"Garnet"	Hizumi	Karyu	4:28
7.	"Abel to Cain" (アベルとカイン)	Hizumi	Karyu, Tsukasa	5:23
8.	"Fuyuu Shita Risou" (「浮遊した理想」)	Hizumi	Karyu	4:26
9.	"Forbidden"	Karyu	Karyu	4:47
10.	"Hai to Ame" (灰と雨)	Hizumi	Tsukasa	5:15
11.	"Tainted World"	Hizumi	Zero	5:15
12.	"[The World in a Cage]"	Karyu	Karyu	2:42
13.	"Marry of the Blood ~bloody minded mix~"	Hizumi	Karyu	5:29
14.	"Born ~white stream mix~"	Hizumi	Karyu	4:52

Track 6 and 8 are not on the limited edition.
