= Maya (musician) =

- Also known as: Maya, Maayatan, MAD MAYA
- Born: Masahito Yamazaki; July 30, 1979 (age 47)
- Origin: Nagano, Japan
- Genres: Rock, pop, electronic rock
- Occupations: Musician, vocalist, guitarest
- Instruments: Vocals, guitar
- Years active: Sinners (1997 - 2002); LM.C (2006 - present)
- Website: LM.C

Maya or Maayatan, real name Masahito Yamazaki (born July 30, 1979) is the lead singer in the Japanese visual kei electronic rock band, LM.C. He was born in Nagano prefecture, Japan.

== History ==
He became interested in bands when he was in elementary school, and started playing guitar when he was in junior high.

In 1997 he formed the underground band, Sinners. He and other members of Sinners were invited to become roadies for PIERROT, but Maya declined; the other members of Sinners became PIERROT roadies. Just five years later in 2002, Sinners broke up. He later became a support guitarist for musician Miyavi in his support band, Ishihara Gundan. While still with Miyavi, Maya and other support members also played live shows as LM.C.

Maya later formed LM.C with Aiji from PIERROT.

On October 4, 2006, LM.C debuted releasing two singles simultaneously, "Trailers【Gold】" and "Trailers【Silver】", with the label Pony Canyon.

When performing as part of LM.C's alt-version "THE MAD LM.C," his personal name changed to MAD MAYA (bassist) for a time。.
