= 88th Regiment =

88th Regiment or 88th Infantry Regiment may refer to:

- 88th Regiment of Foot (disambiguation), several units of the British Army
- 88th Heavy Anti-Aircraft Regiment, Royal Artillery
- 88 Postal and Courier Regiment RLC, Royal Logistics Corps
- 88th Fighter-Bomber Aviation Regiment, a unit of the Yugoslav Air Force
- 88th Infantry Regiment (United States)
- 88th Carnatic Infantry, a unit of the British Indian Army

== Union Army (American Civil War) ==
- 88th Illinois Infantry Regiment
- 88th Indiana Infantry Regiment
- 88th New York Infantry Regiment
- 88th Pennsylvania Infantry Regiment

== See also ==
- 88th Division (disambiguation)
