= 88th Division =

88th Division or 88th Infantry Division may refer to:

== Infantry divisions ==
- 88th Division (National Revolutionary Army), Republic of China
- 88th Division (1st Formation) (People's Republic of China)
- 88th Infantry Division (German Empire)
- 88th Infantry Division (Wehrmacht), Germany
- 88th Division (Imperial Japanese Army)
- 88th Rifle Division, Soviet Union
- 88th Guards Rifle Division, Soviet Union
- 88th Motor Rifle Division, Soviet Union
- 88th Readiness Division, United States

== Armoured divisions ==
- 88th Armoured Division, Iran

== See also ==
- List of military divisions by number
- 88th Brigade (disambiguation)
- 88th Regiment (disambiguation)
- 88th Squadron (disambiguation)
