= Kirito (musician) =

Japanese rock singer and musician (born 1972)

- Born: 村田信也 (Murata Shin'ya); 24 February 1972 (age 54); Sapporo, Japan
- Genres: Rock
- Instruments: Guitar and vocals
- Years active: 1991–present

Kirito (キリト) is a Japanese rock singer and musician. He was born in Sapporo, Hokkaido, Formerly vocalist of the rock band Pierrot, he is now the vocalist of Angelo and also holds a solo career.

== Bands ==
Kirito was initially involved with Pierrot (originally named Dizy-Lizy), then formed Angelo.

=== Pierrot ===
Kirito appeared into the world of rock for the first time in 1991, with the obscure visual kei group Crash and Noise. He then went on to join Dizy-Lizy in early 1992. The first line-up of Dizy-Lizy was Hidelow on vocals, Kirito (then going by his real name, Shinya) and Jun on guitar, Kohta on bass and Luka on drums. After the group changed its name to Pierrot, Hidelow and Luka left, while Takeo and Aiji joined creating its final line-up of; Kirito on vocals, Jun and Aiji on guitar, Kohta on bass and Takeo on drums.

In 1998, the group debuted with the release of its single "Clear Sky". Before the members disbanded in 2006, they created a total of 11 albums and 19 singles.

The group announced it would disband 12 April 2006.

=== Angelo ===
The group members are the remnants from Pierrot which included Kirito, Kohta and Takeo and announced its formation 14 August 2006. It quickly produced their first single, aptly titled "Reborn", which was released 8 November 2006. After only a few months, it released its second single "Winter Moon", 28 February 2007.

On 18 April 2007, they released their first album, titled Rebirth of Newborn Baby.

=== Solo career ===
Kirito's solo work officially began 6 July 2005, seven months before Pierrot disbanded. That same day, he released his first single entitled "Door".

The movie Scary Children's Song (こわい童謡) was released 28 July 2007, with Kirito's song "Heartbeat" as its theme song.

== Discography ==
=== Singles ===
- "Door" (6 July 2005)
- "Tear" (23 March 2006)
- "Decide" (19 July 2006, maxi single)
- "Period" (20 September 2006, maxi single)
- "Cherry trees" (28 March 2007)
- "Heartbeat" (拍動, 25 July 2007)

=== Albums ===
- Hameln (3 August 2005)
- Negative (22 August 2007)
- Neospiral (9 November 2022)
- Alpha (15 November 2023)
- Cross (13 November 2024)

=== DVDs ===
- Kirito Tour 2005 "The Fef of Hameln" Live & Document' (7 December 2005)
- Kirito Tour 2006 "Existence Proof"' (13 December 2006)
- Kirito Symphonic Concert 2006 Existence Proof "Re:Paradox"' (7 March 2007)
- Kirito Acoustic live 18 "Deep Perception" (10 March 2018)
- Kirito Acoustic live 19 "His sight" (26 June 2019)
- Kirito Acoustic live 21 "Undeveloped Area" (23 June 2021)

=== Various artists compilations ===
- Last Days ~ Tribute to Mr.K (5 April 2006)
- Death Note Tribute (21 June 2006)

=== Other ===
- Marty Friedman's Loudspeaker (featured on vocals for track 11, "Static Rain (Noizu no Ame)")

== Written work ==
- Circuit of Thoughts (思考回路, 29 March 2002)
- The Camouflaged Music Industry (偽装音楽業界, 31 October 2003)
- Messiah to the Despairing Youth (絶望的青春の救世主-メシア-, 16 January 2004)
- The Past of Confusion (15 December 2005)

=== Photobooks ===
- The Other Dawn (22 September 2005)

== Live concerts ==
- Kirito Tour 2005 "The Fef of Hameln" (11–28 August 2005)
- Neo Cycloid Limited Show Case "Existence" (5–6 5 April 2006)
- Kirito Tour 2006 "Existence Proof" (20 July – 14 August 2006)
- Kirito Symphonic Concert 2006 Existence Proof "Re:Paradox" (30 September and 1 October 2006)
- Kirito "Brand New Entrance" 06–07 (24 December 2006 – 4 January 2007)
