= Merry (band) =

Japanese visual kei rock band

MERRY
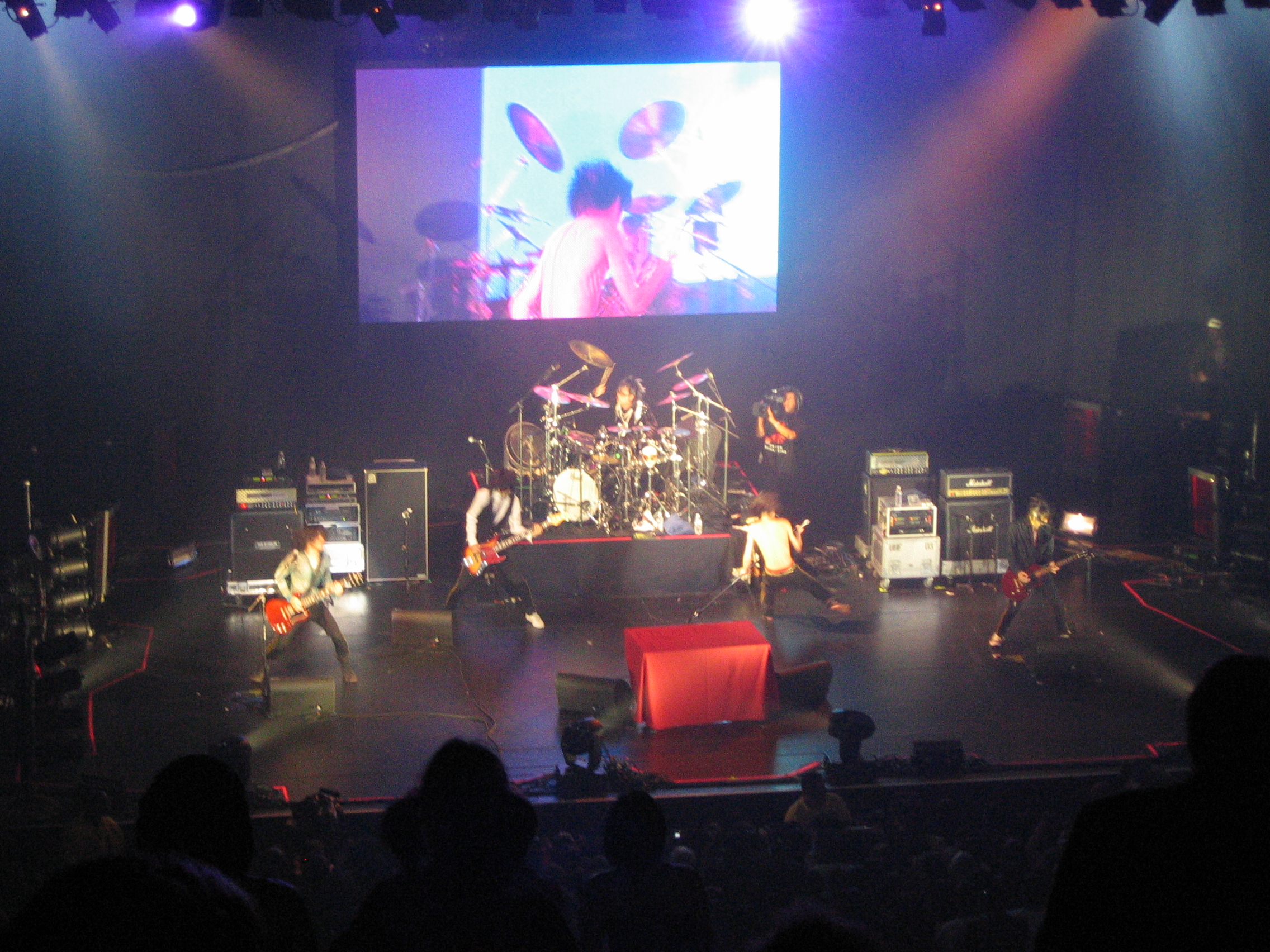
- MERRY at JRock Revolution in 2007

Background information
- Origin: Tokyo, Japan
- Genres: Alternative rock; hard rock; heavy metal; punk rock
- Years active: 2001–present
- Labels: Gekiyaku, Fullface, FRocks, Victor Entertainment, Firewall Div./SMEJ
- Members: Gara; Yuu; Tetsu; Nero
- Past members: Kenichi
- Website: Official site

Merry (メリー, Merī; stylized as MERRY) is a Japanese visual kei rock band formed in Tokyo in 2001. The current member line-up consists of Gara on vocals, Yuu on guitar, Tetsu on bass, and Nero on the drums.

== History ==
=== 2000~2004 ===
In late 2000, after the disbandment of their bands After effect and Shiver respectively, vocalist Gara and guitarist Yuu, only briefly acquainted through a few live events, contacted each other in hopes of a fresh beginning. In the following months of 2001, a series of meetings and discussions over the phone eventually led to the recruitment of the three other members, Tetsu, Nero and Kenichi in that order, and the five of them formed in October 2001 what was to be known as Merry today. Early activities as an obscure indies band included the distribution of 500 copies of a 2-track MD in indie CD stores nationwide, accompanied by a number of secret live shows held in Tokyo and Nagoya.

Regular "serious" activities only began in 2002. Following more live shows, the band created their own independent label Gekiyaku records and released their first maxi-single titled "Haikarasan ga tooru" in February. There were three versions of this single – gold, silver and bronze – each one limited to 1000 copies. Gold and bronze versions were only available through mail order through the rock magazine Fool's Mate, while the silver version was available in stores. All were sold out at pre-order. In March, the band had their first one-man live at Meguro Rockmaykan. A second press of Haikarasan ga tooru, which included a new song "Tokyo Telephone", was then later released in May.

In mid to late 2002, a pair of maxi-singles were released, "Koseiha Blend ~Tasogare-hen~" and "Koseiha Blend ~Junjou Jounetsu-hen~", containing three new tracks each and packaged in LP-sized sleeves illustrated by infamous EroGuro comic artist Suehiro Maruo. Both were limited to 3000 copies and were once again sold out at pre-order. The band also contributed to two omnibus compilations. These releases were accompanied by numerous live events.

In March 2003 the band released their first full album Gendai Stoic on Kiyoharu's (leader and singer of Kuroyume and Sads) Fullface records, selling over 10,000 copies on the day of its release. In June Merry opened for Sadd at Zepp Tokyo, and in August released a third press of "Haikarasan ga Tooru" entitled "Haikarasan ga Toorisugita Ato...", which contained re-recordings of the original songs and a secret track. In the same month the band were working on their first promotional video (PV) of "Violet Harenchi", which was then released on a DVD limited to the one-man live at Shibuya Koukaidou on 29 August. The closing months of 2003 saw a live tour and the band's participation in "Beautifool's Fest '03", a live event organized by Fool's Mate.

2004 began with the release of a pair of maxi-singles in February before the band went into a brief hiatus, working on their second full album. Modern Garde was finally released on 30 June, accompanied by a live tour "New Standard Renaissance." In September Merry participated in a large-scale event, "Kingdom Rock Show 2004", held at the Nippon Budokan, performing beside major bands like Psycho le Cému, Janne Da Arc and Sex Machineguns.

=== 2005~2008 ===
March 2005 saw the release of "Sakashima End Roll ~The Phantom of the Gallery~", a new maxi-single and DVD on reverse sides of single disc – it was to be one of Japan's first titles on the new DualDisc formAt. First press was sold out at pre-order, and the release itself quickly made it to the 2nd spot on the Oricon indies chart.

The one-man live at Shibuya Koukaidou on 31 March saw the announcement of the band's contract with JVC's Victor Entertainment – home to artists such as Buck-Tick, Boøwy, Cali Gari, The Back Horn and Love Psychedelico.

The transition to a major label prompted the release of a best-of album – Koseiha Blend Classic ~Oldies Tracks~ – which contained re-recorded and remastered tracks off the older releases, together with two new songs; first press came with a new PV of "Tick-tock" and second press with the rare "Violet Harenchi" video previously released only at a live show. Fool's Mate published a pair of history books documenting the band's appearances in the magazine, coupled with long interviews and a special CD and DVD. From July to August, Merry set out on their "Last Indies Tour", which finally culminated at the Hibiya outdoors music hall on 10 September – their first major one-man show.

The band's major debut album, Nu Chemical Rhetoric, made it to the 10th spot on the Oricon daily album chart a day before its official release. Concert footage of the Hibiya live was later released on a DVD entitled Sci-fi Nu Chemical Rhetoric ~First Cut~, which similarly made it to the top of the charts.

A pair of DVDs documenting the "Last Indies Tour" were released at the beginning of 2006. Nu Chemical Rhetoric was then released all over Europe, specifically Germany, Austria, Switzerland, France, Scandinavia and Italy. In the meantime, Merry filmed two promotional videos while working on their upcoming album; the first major single "Sayonara Rain" successfully made it to the 24th spot on the Oricon weekly top 30 singles chart (5 June) while the second one titled "Ringo to Uso", released a month later, was No. 25.

Merry once again played at the Hibiya outdoors music hall on 30 July, following the release of their 2nd major album Peep Show on 19 July – footage of the concert will be released on DVD on 20 December. A nationwide one-man tour then took place in August and September.

In late October, the band filmed the video for upcoming single "Calling" at Izu Ōshima, enduring stormy weather. At the same time Peep Show had a European release.

At the start of December, Merry traveled to Europe to perform overseas for the first time in Munich and Paris on 1 and 3 December respectively. Their third major single "Calling" was released on 6 December and featured collaborations with Balzac and The Mad Capsule Markets's Takeshi Ueda. As a closing to 2006 and in commemoration of the band's 5th anniversary, a special countdown live was held at the Shibuya Koukaidou on New Year's Eve.

In February 2007, Merry went on a joint tour with Balzac. Their 4th major single "Blind Romance/Saihate no Parade" was then released on 18 April. Promotional videos were filmed for both songs and "Saihate no Parade" was used as the ending theme for the Over Drive anime. In May, Merry went on the brief "Oriental Circus" tour, playing in Tokyo, Osaka and Nagoya.

On 26 May, Merry performed at the J-Rock Revolution Festival held in Los Angeles, America, alongside artists such as Mucc, Girugamesh and D'espairsRay. Another tour went through the late summer of 2007.

=== 2009~Present ===
MERRY released the single "Identity" on 7 November 2009. The release marked the band's return to an independent label.

Merry have participated on two tribute albums which are scheduled for release on 10 November & 1 December 2010. The first being Pierrot to Suika to Yayauke Rider Subete wa World Peace no Tame ni – Saikyo Senshi-tachi ga Koko ni Shuketsu - which is a tribute to Atsushi Inoue, vocalist of punk rock band New Rote'ka.

The second is Romantist – The Stalin, Michiro Endo Tribute Album - which is a tribute album celebrating the 60th birthday of The Stalin front man, Michiro Endo. Many prominent artists pay their tributes to the founder & front man of the influential 80s punk band, including Buck-Tick, Group Tamashii, Dir En Grey, Jun Togawa, Wagdug Futuristic Unity, Yuki etc.

Merry covered Dir En Grey's song "Schwein no Isu" for the compilation Crush! -90's V-Rock Best Hit Cover Songs-, the album was released on 26 January 2011 and features current visual kei bands covering songs from bands that were important to the '90s visual kei movement.

Their 7th album "Beautiful Freaks" was released on 27 July 2011.

They covered Buck-Tick's "Aku no Hana" for Parade II -Respective Tracks of Buck-Tick-, released on 4 July 2012.

The band went on hiatus in February 2013 due to vocalist Gara's need for hernia treatment. The band resumed activities in August. However, in October bassist Tetsu was involved in an onstage accident with a stage diver that resulted in him receiving a severe neck injury. Tetsu would spend the next two and a half years out of the eyes of the public, focusing on rehabilitation. Initially the band performed with supporting bassists, but eventually settled on playing along to Tetsu's bass lines from the studio recordings.

On 24 December 2014, MERRY released its new studio-album titled "NOnsenSe MARkeT". For the first time in the band's history, frontman Gara wrote all the lyrics before writing the music, as he confessed in an interview for VerdamMnis Magazine. As the name of the album suggests, the concept of the album is based on the criticism of Japan and more generally modern societies. Singer Gara discusses Japan's politics and societal issues with French reporter Mandah Frenot in an in-depth interview for VerdamMnis Magazine.

On 2 January 2015, MERRY performed at Shibuya Kokaido, where during the double encore Tetsu made his first stage appearance since his accident. He joined the band for the song "Gunjou", playing whilst having his bass on a stand (as opposed to a strap) and wore a neck brace. This marked the beginning of Tetsu's gradual return to the band full-time. Throughout the year Tetsu would join the band for encores, gradually increasing the number of songs he performed with them.

In November 2015, the band launched "Lamb Fest", a two-day festival hosted by MERRY. As VerdamMnis Magazine stated in live report article, "the two-day festival was an opportunity for the Japanese quintet to celebrate its 14th anniversary".

On 7 February 2016, MERRY performed the final show of their tour in support of "NOnsenSe MARkeT". The show marked Tetsu's return as full-time bassist, albeit still using a stand and neck brace.

On 27 January 2017, MERRY released a new single titled "Heijitsu no Onna".

On 5 May, the band performed at the Hibiya Yagai Ongakudo. During the encore, Tetsu performed without a neck brace or stand. Since this, Tetsu has begun to occasionally perform encores in the same way.

They released a new studio album titled "M-ology" on 6 September. They also covered "So..." by D'erlanger for the D'erlanger Tribute Album ~Stairway to Heaven~.

Beginning on 3 September, MERRY commenced their 47-prefecture tour in support of "M-ology" titled "System M-ology". They also covered "Ieji" by MUCC for their tribute album.

In May 2020, guitarist Kenichi left the band.

== Members ==
- Gara (ガラ) – vocals
  - Ex-Visage (as Makoto); Ex-Dir en grey roadie; Ex-After effect (as Makoto); Born 6 July in Gunma prefecture
- Yuu (結生) – guitar
  - Ex-Shiver; Born 2 April in Ehime prefecture. Also in the X Japan cover band X Suginami with Dancho (Nogod), Miya (Mucc), Akane (ex-The Scanty) and Daisuke (Jupiter).
- Tetsu (テツ) – bass
  - Ex-ACiD; Born 21 November in Aichi prefecture. Has acted as live support for Deadman since 2019.
- Nero (ネロ) – drums
  - Ex-Smoky Flavor (as Kuni); Ex-After effect (as Kuni); Born 11 February in Saitama prefecture

=== Past members ===
- Kenichi (健一) – guitar
  - Ex-Crescent (as Ken); Ex-Syndrome (as Ken); Born 14 July in Gunma prefecture

== Musical style ==
Merry mainly blend the genres of classical rock 'n' roll, hard rock, punk, alternative, blues and jazz fusion, occasionally experimenting with undertones of heavy metal, surf, techno, ballads and more. Though some may not find this entirely appealing, the result is undeniably "totally fresh", as former Megadeth guitarist Marty Friedman put it.

Like many others, the members themselves were influenced by Japanese pioneer rock bands of the 80s and early 90s such as Buck-Tick, D'erlanger, Luna Sea, Kuroyume, The Blue Hearts and Boøwy. The main songwriters are the two guitarists Yuu and Kenichi.

The band's music and lyrical imagery are likely influenced by the liberal Taisho and early Shōwa era, a period of significant artistic and musical movement when Japan shifted further towards Western concepts. It was the time of avant-garde; industrialisation saw the introduction of jazz and blues to Japanese culture, bringing about the rise of music cafes, bars and clubs. Similarly Merry fuse these genres with modern rock music to create a whole new style – a "modern avant-garde", or rather "modern-garde" as their second album is named.

Lyrics-wise, vocalist Gara writes on a broad variety of topics, ranging from themes of war & patriotism (Rest in peace, Japanese modernist, 愛国行進曲 "Patriot march"), politics & society (迷彩ノ紳士 "Gentlemen in disguise", ニセモノ天国 "Fake heaven", Lost generation) to those of dreams, life, love and hate (窓 "Window", 恋愛交差点 "Intersection of love"). Some of these carry a retro feel in their imagery (黄昏レストラン "Sunset restaurant", 薔薇と片隅のブルース "Blues of the rose and corner", 東京テレホン "Tokyo telephone" and R-246), once again attributed to the influence of Taisho era romanticism.

== In-depth information ==
=== External relationships ===
Merry is most notably connected to the popular Dir en grey – the band's name never fails to appear in the "very special thanks" credits in every release. Before forming his own band, Gara was a roadie for Dir en grey, forming a close bond with vocalist Kyo, whom he still considers his senior and mentor. Gara is also known to hold a lot of respect for Kiyoharu (solo artist and vocalist for Sads and Kuroyume)

Horror punk band Balzac has also been very supportive of Merry. In 2006 the two bands combined efforts in a reconstruction of one of Merry's songs "Hi no Ataranai Basho". They have also previously performed together at several live events.

Merry are also closely related to Mucc, Kagerou and Craze, the members being good friends with each other.

=== Super Merries ===
スーパーメリーズ (Suupaa Meriizu) Super Merries is the alter-ego band of Merry. The members all dress differently and play under the following stagenames:

- Gara – Mamurasaki (真紫)
- Yuu – Zaku (ザク)
- Kenichi – Serpico (セルピコ)
- Tetsu – Shadow (シャドウ)
- Nero – Fukurokouji Kaname (袋小路 要)

Very little is known about them as they have only appeared in a few live shows and a special feature in Fool's Mate. They seem to be currently defunct, though there's no telling when they may spring up again.

== Discography ==
=== Albums ===
- 13 April 2003 – Gendai stoic
- 30 June 2004 – Modern garde
- 7 September 2005 – nu chemical rhetoric
- 19 July 2006 – Peep Show
- 7 November 2007 – M. E. R. R. Y.
- 25 February 2009 – Under-World
- 27 July 2011 – Beautiful Freaks
- 24 December 2014 – NOnsenSe MARkeT
- 6 September 2017 – M-OLOGY
- 3 November 2021 - Strip
- 12 February 2025 - The Last Scene

=== EPs ===
- 4 July 2009 – BURST EP
- 7 November 2009 – BURST EPDVD/Live at Shinjuku LOFT

=== Singles & maxi-singles ===
- 23 February 2002 – Haikarasan ga tooru (gold/silver/bronze versions)
- 23 May 2002 – Haikarasan ga tooru. 2nd press ni ano meikyoku tsuika
- 31 July 2002 – Untitled single (livehouse limited)
- 15 September 2002 – Koseiha blend ~Tasogare-hen~
- 17 November 2002 – Koseiha blend ~Junjou jounetsu-hen~
- 6 August 2003 – Haikarasan ga toorisugita ato...
- 1 December 2003 – Japanese modernist / R-246 (livehouse limited version)
- 9 January 2004 – Tamerai shuffle / T.O.P (livehouse limited version)
- 11 February 2004 – Tamerai shuffle / T.O.P
- 11 February 2004 – Japanese modernist / R-246
- 13 July 2004 – New standard Renaissance (tour limited)
- 16 March 2005 – Sakashima end roll ~phantom of the gallery~ (DualDisc)
- 24 May 2006 – Sayonara rain
- 21 June 2006 – Ringo to uso
- 6 December 2006 – Calling
- 18 April 2007 – Blind Romance / Saihate no Parade
- 8 August 2007 – Komorebi ga boku o sagashiteru...
- 16 April 2008 – Tozasareta rakuen
- 27 August 2008 – Gekisei
- 26 November 2008 – Fuyu no Castanet
- 4 August 2010 – The Cry Against... / Monochrome
- 6 October 2010 – Crisis Moment
- 1 December 2010 – Yakou
- 4 June 2011 – Hameln
- 2 May 2012 – Gunjou
- 6 February 2013 – Fukurou
- 10 August 2013 – Mado -replay-
- 6 November 2013 – Zero
- 5 August 2015 – Happy life
- 27 January 2016 – Heijitsu no onna
- 1 February 2017 – Kasa to Ame
- 7 November 2018 – Sheeple

=== Compilations ===
- 25 June 2005 – Koseiha blend classic ~Oldies Tracks~ (Re-recordings album)
- 7 November 2009 – Identity (Live album)
- 26 September 2012 MERRY VERY BEST ～白い羊/黒い羊～ (Best-of album)

=== DVDs ===
- 29 August 2003 – Violet harenchi ~030829 Limited Edition~ (PV)
- 16 March 2005 – Sakashima end roll ~phantom of the gallery~ (DualDisc) (concert footage, PV & documents)
- 7 September 2005 – nu chemical rhetoric first press (PVs and making-of)
- 21 December 2005 – Sci-Fi nu chemical rhetoric ~first cut~ (concert footage)
- 1 February 2006 – Last Indies Tour documents DVD ~Part 2 of 2~ "Shambara to the Core～Act 2～"
- 31 March 2006 – Last Indies Tour documents DVD ~Part 1 of 2~ "Shambara to the Core ～Act 1～"
- 19 July 2006 – Peep Show first press (PVs and making-of)
- 20 December 2006 – Many Merry Days No. 1 – Peep Show (concert footage & documents)
- 7 November 2007 – M.E.R.R.Y. first press (PV and concert footage)
- 25 December 2007 – Many Merry Days 5th Anniversary Special 2night – Shiroi hitsuji / Kuroi hitsuji (concert footage)
- 23 July 2008 – Many Merry Days FINAL Yokohama Bunka Taiikukan
- 25 February 2009 – Under-World DVD (Limited Edition)
- 22 April 2009 – VIC -VIDEO ID COLLECTION-
- 26 August 2009 – TOUR09 under-world [GI・GO] (Regular/CORE Limited Edition)
- 8 August 2012 – MERRY 10th Anniversary NEW LEGEND OF HIGH COLOR "6DAYS"
- 31 July 2013 – MERRY VERY BEST 20121130 Akasaka BLITZ 〜Special 2night[Kuroi Hitsuji]〜
- 31 July 2013 – MERRY VERY BEST 20121130 Akasaka BLITZ 〜Special 2night[Shiroi Hitsuji]〜
- 31 July 2013 – MERRY VERY BEST 20121130 Akasaka BLITZ 〜Special 2night[Shiroi Hitsuji][Kuroi Hitsuji]〜
- 22 June 2016 – NOnsenSe MARkeT FINAL -最終階- 2016.2.7 EX THEATER ROPPONGI
- 23 May 2018 – CORE LIMITED LIVE DVD「47都道府県TOUR システム エムオロギー ～AGITATE FINAL「禁断」 2018.2.3 日本青年館」

=== MDs ===
- October 2001 – Untitled MD

=== Omnibus ===
- Stand Proud! III (11 December 2002)
  - (With the track "Strength Beyond Strength" by Pantera)
- Yougenkyou II (29 May 2002)
  - (With the track "Rojiura Melancholy Remix")
- Luna Sea Memorial Cover Album -Re:birth- (19 December 2007)
  - (With the track "Precious")
- The Blue Hearts "25th Anniversary" Tribute (24 February 2010)
  - (With the track "Minagoroshi no Melody")
- Pierrot to Suika to Yayauke Rider Subete wa World Peace no Tame ni – Saikyo Senshi-tachi ga Koko ni Shuketsu - (10 November 2010)
- Romantist – The Stalin, Michiro Endo Tribute Album - (1 December 2010)
  - (With the track "Odyssey・1985・Sex" by Michiro Endo)
- Crush! -90's V-Rock Best Hit Cover Songs- (26 January 2011)
  - (With the track "Schwein no Isu" by Dir en grey)
- Parade II -Respective Tracks of Buck-Tick- (4 July 2012)
  - (With the track "Aku no Hana")
- D'erlanger Tribute Album ~Stairway to Heaven~ (13 September 2017)
  - (With the track "So...")

=== Books ===
- October 2005 – Official history book, vol. 2 Haikara kaitai shinsho ~gekan~ (with DVD)
- June 2005 – Official history book, vol. 1 Haikara kaitai shinsho ~joukan~ (with CD)
