= D'erlanger =

Japanese rock band

- Origin: Kyoto Prefecture, Japan
- Genres: Alternative rock; gothic rock; punk rock; hard rock
- Years active: 1983–1990, 2007–present
- Labels: Mandrake Root; Danger Crue; BMG Victor/Ariola; Cutting Edge; Warner Music Japan
- Members: Cipher; Seela; Tetsu; Kyo
- Past members: Kaoru; Shi-Do; Dizzy
- Website: www.derlanger.jp

D'erlanger (stylized as D'ERLANGER (Note: The name "D'erlanger" is claimed by the band, and commonly reported by Japanese media, to mean "indecent temptation" in French. However, the official website of France's Centre national de ressources textuelles et lexicales returns no such search result for the word. Japan-based French music journalist Mandah Frénot suggested the name was derived from the French word "déranger".)) is a Japanese rock band from Kyoto Prefecture, formed in 1983 by guitarist Cipher and bassist Seela. While they originally played speed and power metal, after recruiting drummer Tetsu and vocalist Kyo they switched to a punk rock sound for their debut album La Vie En Rose in 1989. Although it was on an indie label, it sold out and was reissued three times that year, earning them a major label record deal with BMG Japan the following year. They released Basilisk in March 1990 and it reached the top five on the charts. However, in December the group suddenly announced their disbandment.

Despite their short time in the spotlight, D'erlanger remain well-known and are considered one of the founders of visual kei. They reunited in 2007 and released the album Lazzaro, with a new harder sound that adds a gothic rock feel. They have since released six more studio albums and toured extensively, including several overseas performances.

== History ==
=== Formation to disbandment: 1983–1990 ===
D'erlanger was formed in Kyoto Prefecture in December 1983 by guitarist Ichiro "Cipher" Takigawa and bassist Tomohiro "Seela" Nakao. The two were introduced by vocalist Kaoru Miyahira, Seela's high school classmate, and drummer Tadashi "Shi-Do" Uno completed the first line-up. They gave their first performance at the Osaka Bourbon House in May 1984, when Cipher was just sixteen years old. Suon Lemon of J-Rock Magazine proposes that, because that was an event organized by a music store, their first official concert actually took place at the same venue in June. In August 1984, Kaoru was replaced on vocals by Yoshifumi "Dizzy" Fukui.

D'erlanger then began to actively perform live and released three demo tapes by 1985; "Tonight", "The Birth of Splendid Beast!!" and "Blue". They also formed their official fan club, Kids Blue. On October 26, 1986, they participated in the New Power Metal Audition event at Meguro Rock-May-Kan, which was organized by the Mandrake Root independent record label to celebrate its first anniversary. D'erlanger won the contest and the label released their single "Girl" on February 20, 1987. Initially planned for a pressing of 1,000 copies, it was increased to 3,000 due to demand. They also appear on Mandrake's March 1987 omnibus album Hungry Days, which was recorded live at the New Power Metal Audition event, performing their song "Like a Beast". The band then distributed another demo tape for free on February 22, it contained only "Sadistic Emotion".

On August 1, 1987, D'erlanger had their first one-man concert at Meguro Rock-May-Kan. In October, Shi-Do decided to leave the band, he was replaced by Mephistopheles drummer Tetsu, who was a roadie for 44Magnum alongside Cipher, in October. Unhappy with Cipher taking the band's music in a new direction, Dizzy left D'erlanger in June 1988. Kyo, whom Tetsu had previously played with in Saver Tiger, became their new vocalist on July 1, completing the band's classic lineup. In addition to Cipher and Tetsu's connection to 44Magnum, Kyo was also influenced by them and their lead singer Paul. Their first show with Kyo was at Osaka Bourbon House on July 22, 1988. In November, the band went on their Sadistical Punk Tour.

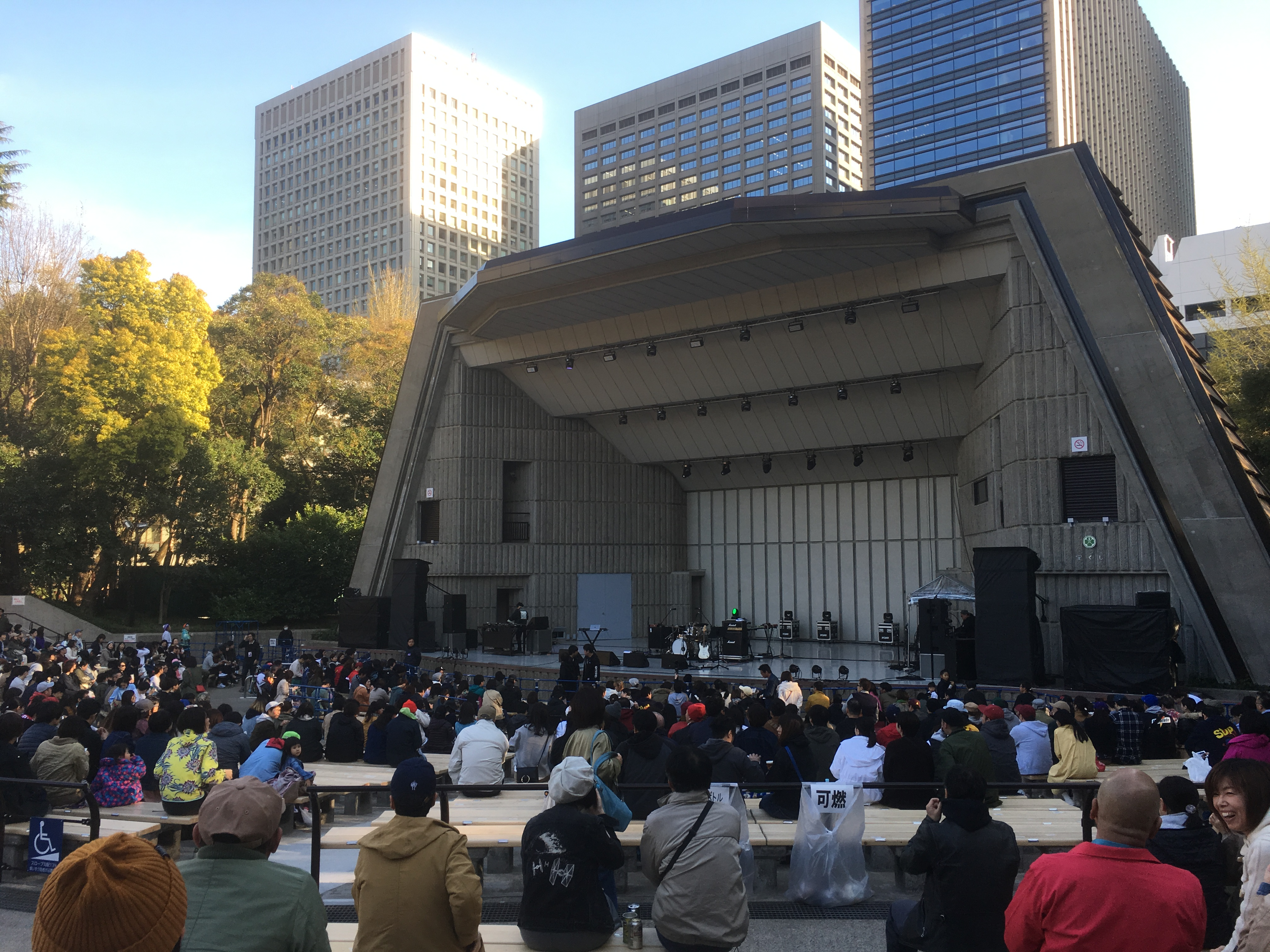
Hibiya Open-Air Concert Hall, where D'erlanger performed what became their penultimate concerts in 1990.

In January 1989, D'erlanger freely distributed 3,000 copies of the single "La Vie En Rose". The band released their first album, La Vie En Rose, through Danger Crue Records on February 10. All copies were sold out just by pre-orders, so they released another press eleven days later. The album's sound was a drastic departure from their previous material, being punk and alternative rock instead of the speed and power metal they originally had. June and July saw another tour under the Sadistical Punk title. The band's first home video, An Aphrodisiac, was released on October 15, with all 10,000 copies sold-out by pre-order. D'erlanger then began the short Incarnation of Eroticism Tour, which concluded on October 28 with a concert at Hibiya Open-Air Concert Hall.

The band started 1990 off by signing to major label Ariola, at the time a sub label of BMG Victor. Their first major label release was the single "Darlin'" on January 25. It was followed by the Incarnation of Eroticism live concert video on February 7, and their second studio album Basilisk on March 7. March also saw the three-date Ai to Shi to Koh-Kotsu Tour (愛と死と恍惚 TOUR), which saw another leg in May. The single "Lullaby -1990-" was released on September 5, before D'erlanger started the Moon and the Memories Tour on September 10. The Kindan no Tobira ~Abstinence's Door~ home video was released on October 3, before a second leg of the tour began the following day and ended at Kōsei Nenkin Kaikan in Osaka on October 31.

On December 24, 1990, D'erlanger shocked their fans by suddenly announcing that they had disbanded. A home video and two separate live albums entitled Moon and the Memories... the Eternities Last Live 1 and 2 were released on March 6, 1991. All of which were recorded from their penultimate concerts on October 27 and 28, 1990 at Hibiya Open-Air Concert Hall in Tokyo. On April 21, 1995, both their studio albums were remastered and re-released. In 2020, Danger Crue Records founder Masahiro Oishi said that D'erlanger broke up due to poor management.

=== Reunited: 2007–2012 ===
Following the disbandment, the four members of D'erlanger remained close and met relatively often, such as attending each other's concerts. In 2005, they began the process of reuniting. On March 14, 2007, D'erlanger released their third studio album, Lazzaro. Containing their first new material in 17 years, it was released by Cutting Edge, a sub label of Avex Group. Also released that same day, was a greatest hits album and DVD Pandora was released. On April 22, they played their "rejuvenation performance" entitled Bara Iro no Sekai - Rosy Eyesight at Zepp Tokyo, which was released on DVD on September 19. On September 22, 2007, D'erlanger held Abstinence's Door #001, which was an event where themselves, Mucc and Merry performed.

They released the single "Zakuro" on March 19, 2008. It includes "Love Anymore", which was first composed by Cipher when he was sixteen years old and included on the "Blue" demo tape under the name "Telephon", with new lyrics by Kyo. The band released their fourth album The Price of Being a Rose is Loneliness on April 30. They then embarked on the D'erlanger Tour '08 -A Rose Insane- tour. The tour started on May 6 with the D'erlanger 25th Anniversary concert at the Nihon Budokan. Footage from this concert was released on December 10, as the Bara Iro no Jinsei -La Vie en Rose- DVD. D'erlanger held Abstinence's Door #002 on September 21, Inoran, Merry and heidi. performed. Abstinence's Door #003 was held on November 8, with the Underneath and La;Cen-zhow. performing. The following day was Abstinence's Door #004, where lynch., Sadie and the Underneath performed.

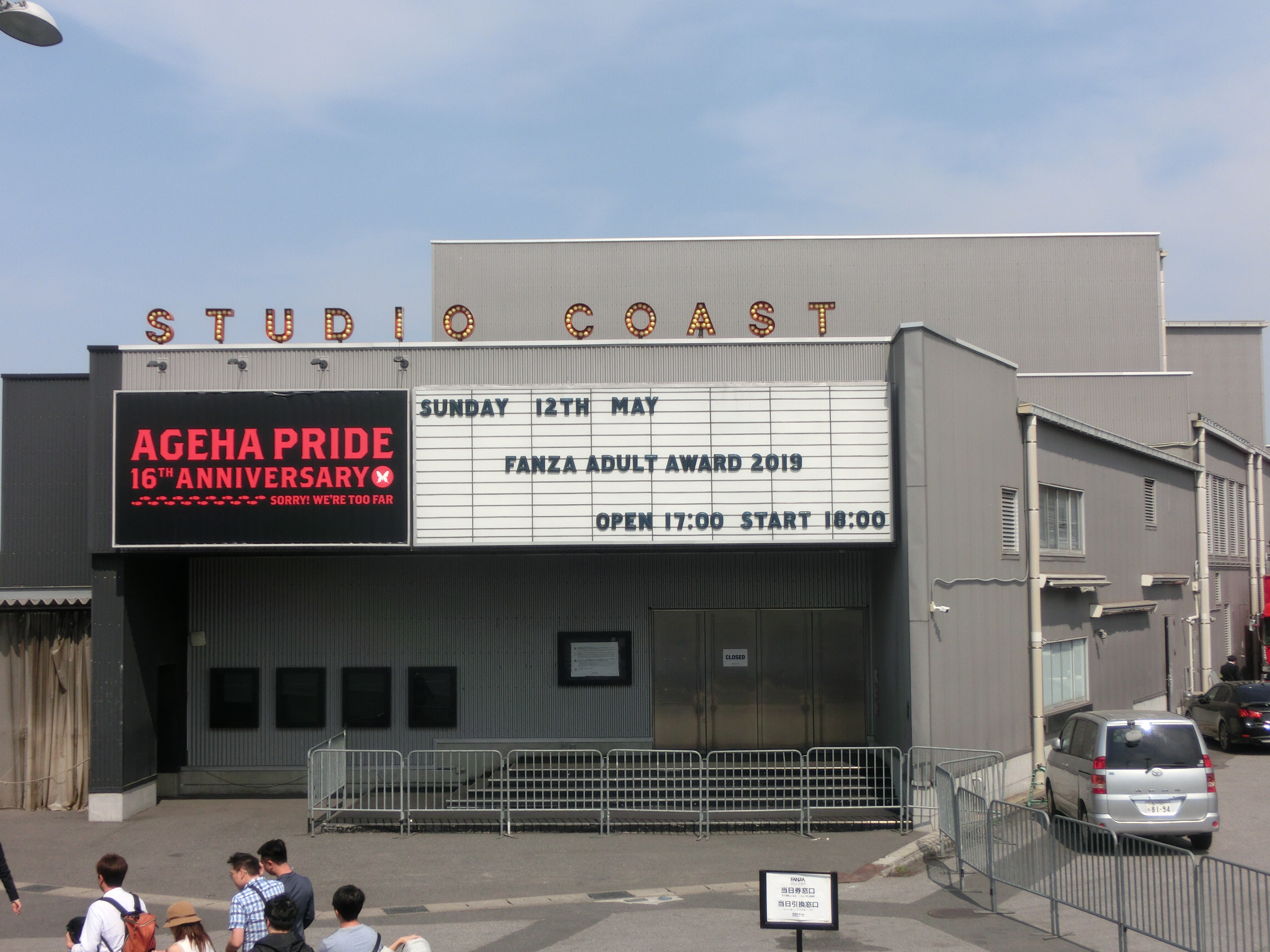
D'erlanger have held several of their Abstinence's Door events at Studio Coast.

On July 25, 2009, they played in Taipei, Taiwan. It was the band's first performance in a foreign country. D'erlanger performed at the V-Rock Festival '09 on October 24, the show was broadcast live worldwide on the festival's official website. They also held a gig in South Korea on October 30. The band then released their fifth album, the self-titled D'erlanger, on November 11, 2009. The album includes a studio version of "Easy Make, Easy Mark", a song they wrote and played back in the '80s.

On September 19 and 20, 2010, Abstinence's Door #005 and Abstinence's Door #006 took place. Head Phones President, defspiral and Girugamesh performed the first night, whereas Acid Android and Pia performed the second night. Each concert was streamed worldwide live on Ustream.tv. Abstinence's Door #007 was held three days later in Taipei, with Taiwanese band Overdose and Korean Pia performing.

D'erlanger announced they would release an album entitled A Fabulous Thing in Rose, on September 29, 2010. It contains eleven tracks: 8 self-cover versions of songs from their first 2 studio albums, an English version of "La Vie En Rose", plus the new tracks "Everything is Nothing" (a song they wrote and played back in the '80s) and the instrumental "Adameve". It is available in two versions. The regular edition only includes the three "best tracks": "XXX for You", "Zakuro" and "Angelic Poetry" (which were selected from the three albums released after their comeback), and the "bonus track: "Dummy Blue (English Lyrics)". Whereas the limited edition includes the same three "best tracks", the three "bonus tracks": "Dummy Blue (English Lyrics)", "La Vie En Rose" and "An Aphrodisiac (Trance Rock Remix)", a special book, a 64-page photobook, a poster and more.

On December 13, it was announced on their official website that D'erlanger would be performing in Moscow, Russia at the XO-Club on April 30, 2011. However, on March 29, after the 2011 Tōhoku earthquake and tsunami that occurred on March 11 in Japan, the band decided to postpone the show until a new date can be announced. This would have been the band's first concert in a European country. They once again returned to Taiwan, this time for a performance at the Hohaiyan Rock Festival on July 15, 2012. D'erlanger covered "Iconoclasm" for Parade II -Respective Tracks of Buck-Tick-, a tribute album to Buck-Tick, and participated on the album's tour Buck-Tick Fest 2012 On Parade on September 23.

=== Warner Music Japan: 2013–present ===
D'erlanger released their sixth studio album, #Sixx, on May 22, 2013. It was their first release since switching record labels from Cutting Edge to Warner Music Japan. They covered hide's song "Genkai Haretsu" for Tribute VII -Rock Spirits-, released in December 2013. 2014 saw a continuation of the sixth album's tour, titled #Sixx-69-. Their next album, Spectacular Nite -Kuruoshii Yoru ni Tsuite-, followed on April 22, 2015. On May 2 D'erlanger began a nationwide tour in celebration of their 25th anniversary that finished on June 14 at Akasaka Blitz. They also performed at the second day of Luna Sea's Lunatic Fest on June 28, as well as at Angelo's annual Intersection of Dogma concert on August 5.

The group released J'aime La Vie on May 3, 2017, which became their highest-charting studio album since reuniting. They also began celebrating the 10th anniversary of their reunion. A tribute album to the band called D'erlanger Tribute Album ~Stairway to Heaven~ was released on September 13, 2017. It contains covers of their songs by acts such as Dir En Grey, Hyde, Teru and Hisashi, and Psycho le Cému. D'erlanger then hosted and performed at Abstinence's Door #008 and #009 at EX Theater Roppongi on September 15 and 16. The first included Angelo and Dezert, the second saw lynch. and Psycho le Cému perform, while D'erlanger performed with Hyde the first night and Kiyoharu the second.

The band held Abstinence's Door #010 on April 20, 2019, with Merry and Cali Gari. D'erlanger released their ninth album Roneve on May 22. It was supported by a fifteen-date nationwide tour from May to July.

On September 14, 2021, D'erlanger announced the postponement of their nationwide Agito Tour, which was set to begin later in the month, so that Kyo could have a tumor on his lung removed. D'erlanger performed at the Jack in the Box 2021 event on December 27. The three instrumentalists in the band were first joined by Tatsuro and Hyde on vocals for a song each, before returning to the stage later in the show with Kyo for one song. The Agito tour eventually took place between March and July 2022 and celebrated the 15th anniversary of the band's reunion. D'erlanger performed on August 27 at the So no Sekai event hosted by Arlequin. Their anniversary celebration continued with five shows at Veats Shibuya under the title Sadistical Punk 2022 between September and November. D'erlanger held the Anonymouz tour for 22 shows from May 13 to July 30, 2023. On September 13, 2023, the band release their tenth studio album, Rosy Moments 4D. In an interview with Visual Music Japan, Kyo said the album's title features the word "rose", which appears at particular milestones for the band.

== Musical style and legacy ==
D'erlanger are often credited as one of the founding acts of Japan's visual kei movement. Tomokazu Nishihiro of Real Sound wrote that by showing influence from metal, punk and early Japanese rock in their music, they affected the sound as well as the image of visual kei. Kiyoharu said that, with band's like Boøwy and Buck-Tick being popular at the time, D'erlanger's mix of "beat rock" with metal was "shocking." Tomoyuki Hokari of OK Music also described their music as taking aspects from beat rock like Boøwy and mixing it with metal like 44Magnum. Music website Geki-Rock wrote that they had a great influence on the music scene and subsequent artists by incorporating various elements of rock music—punk, goth, beat rock, heavy rock, and digital—into their songs. Nishihiro stated that D'erlanger are still held up as a unique band decades later because each member is distinct and unlike any other musician.

Multiple members of D'erlanger listed Boøwy, Buck-Tick, Bauhaus, the Sex Pistols and Hanoi Rocks as being among their favorite musicians. Cipher included The Cure, Love and Rockets and Dead End as some of his favorite acts, and cited 44Magnum guitarist Jimmy as his idol. Seela named Mötley Crüe, the Street Sliders and Personz as his favorite bands, and cited Nikki Sixx as his idol. Tetsu listed Missing Persons, INXS, Toy Dolls and 44Magnum as some of his favorite acts, and named Terry Bozzio as his idol. In addition to some of the already mentioned acts, Kyo included The Lords of the New Church and The Zolge on his list of favorite musicians, and cited Michael Monroe as his idol. In 2007, Tetsu said he had previously been aiming for a more minimalist style and drum setup, but this changed after befriending Chad Smith. Influenced by Smith teaching him to "just have fun", Tetsu started using many drums in his kit, like Bozzio.

Kerrang! included Basilisk on a list of 13 essential Japanese rock and metal albums, writing that its songs "engulfed a generation with a burgeoning erogenous intensity the scene has seldom seen since." Kamaitachi guitarist Kazzy and vocalist Sceana both expressed admiration at Cipher's stage presence. Inoran was influenced by D'erlanger as a teenager and has expressed particular admiration for Cipher on several occasions. His Luna Sea bandmate Shinya described D'erlanger as exemplifying all the elements of visual kei and praised Tetsu's drumming. Hyde looks up to D'erlanger, particularly Kyo, whose style he imitates. Dir En Grey guitarist Die developed his love of the instrument from La Vie En Rose and called Cipher his "guitar hero." Mucc guitarist Miya has said that D'erlanger was the reason he started a band, and Dezert drummer Sora is also a big fan.

== Members ==
Current members

- Ichiro "Cipher" Takigawa (瀧川 一郎, Takigawa Ichirō) – guitar, backing vocals 1983–1990, 2007–present (→Body, Craze)
- Tomohiro "Seela" Nakao (中尾 朋宏, Nakao Tomohiro) – bass, backing vocals 1983–1990, 2007–present (→Fix, Vinyl, Atomic Zaza, No Stars Innovation)
- Tetsu Kikuchi (菊地 哲, Kikuchi Tetsu) – drums 1987–1990, 2007–present (ex:Rabbit, Dead Wire, Saver Tiger, Mephistopheles,→Zi:Kill, Body, Craze)
- Hiroshi "Kyo" Isono (磯野 宏, Isono Hiroshi) – vocals 1988–1990, 2007–present (ex:Runaway Boys, Dead Wire, Saver Tiger, Ba-Ra,→Die in Cries, Bug)

Former members

- Kaoru Miyahira (宮平 薫, Miyahara Kaoru) – vocals 1983–1984
- Tadashi "Shi-Do" Uno (宇野 忠, Uno Tadashi) – drums 1983–1987
- Yoshifumi "Dizzy" Fukui (福井 祥史, Fukui Yoshifumi) – vocals 1984–1988 (→Strawberry Fields, Vinyl)

== Discography ==
=== Studio albums ===
- La Vie En Rose (February 10, 1989), Oricon Albums Chart Peak Position: No. 25
- Basilisk (March 7, 1990) No. 5
- Lazzaro (March 14, 2007) No. 32
- The Price of Being a Rose is Loneliness (April 30, 2008) No. 22
- D'erlanger (November 11, 2009) No. 19
- #Sixx (May 22, 2013) No. 16
- Spectacular Nite -Kuruoshii Yoru ni Tsuite- (Spectacular Nite -狂おしい夜について-; April 22, 2015) No. 18
- J'aime La Vie (May 3, 2017) No. 14
- Roneve (May 22, 2019) No. 15
- Rosy Moments 4D (September 13, 2023) No. 17
- Evermore (April 22, 2026) No. 14

=== Live albums ===
- Moon and the Memories... the Eternities Last Live 1 (March 6, 1991) No. 5
- Moon and the Memories... the Eternities Last Live 2 (March 6, 1991) No. 7
- #Sixx -Discordantly- (December 18, 2013) No. 117
- D'erlanger Reunion 10th Anniversary Live 2017-2018 (September 12, 2018) No. 115

=== Other albums ===
- Pandora (March 14, 2007, greatest hits compilation with DVD) No. 54
- A Fabulous Thing in Rose (September 29, 2010, self-cover album) No. 26
- D'erlanger Tribute Album ~Stairway to Heaven~ (September 13, 2017, tribute album) No. 4

=== Singles ===
- "Girl" (February 20, 1987)
- "La Vie En Rose" (January 1989)
- "Darlin'" (January 25, 1990), Oricon Singles Chart Peak Position: No. 9
- "Lullaby -1990-" (September 5, 1990, cassette & CD contain different B-sides) No. 12
- "Zakuro" (柘榴; March 19, 2008) No. 26

=== Demos ===
- "Tonight" (1984)
- "The Birth of Splendid Beast!!" (December 26, 1985)
- "Blue" (1985)
- "Sadistic Emotion" (February 22, 1987)

=== Home videos ===
- An Aphrodisiac (October 15, 1989)
- La Vie En Rose (October 28, 1989, given by lottery at a Hibiya Open-Air Concert Hall gig)
- Incarnation of Eroticism ~Live at Hibiya-Yaon on 28. Oct. '89~ (VHS: February 7, 1990, DVD: May 23, 2001)
- Kid's Blue PYX '90 SPR (March 1990, sold with a magazine)
- Kindan no Tobira ~Abstinence's Door~ (禁断の扉 ~Abstinence's Door~; VHS: October 3, 1990, DVD: May 23, 2001)
- Moon and the Memories... the Eternities/Last Video (VHS: March 31, 1991, DVD: May 23, 2001)
- Bara Iro no Sekai (薔薇色の視界; September 19, 2007), Oricon DVDs Chart Peak Position: No. 16
- Bara Iro no Jinsei -La Vie En Rose- (薔薇色の人生 -La Vie En Rose-; December 10, 2008) No. 36
- 13e Cross Intoxication (March 24, 2010) No. 63
- Deep Inside of You (September 28, 2011, DVD & CD) No. 25
- #Sixx -Flick- (December 18, 2013) No. 51
- Spectacular Nite -Kuruoshii Yoru ni Tsuite- Tour 2015 Final at Akasaka Blitz 2015.06.14 (Spectacular Nite -狂おしい夜について- TOUR 2015 FINAL at 赤坂BLITZ 20150614; November 4, 2015, Blu-ray & 2 CDS), Oricon Blu-rays Chart Peak Position: No. 19
- D'erlanger Reunion 10th Anniversary Live 2017-2018 (September 12, 2018) DVD: No. 46, Blu-Ray: 25
