= La Vie En Rose (album) =

- Original first press cover

Studio album by D'erlanger
- Released: February 10, 1989
- Recorded: October 1988
- Studio: Star Ship
- Genres: Punk rock; gothic rock; alternative rock; post-punk
- Label: Danger Crue
- Producer: Masahiro Ohishi

D'erlanger chronology
La Vie En Rose (1989)	Basilisk (1990)

La Vie En Rose is the debut album by the Japanese rock band D'erlanger, released by Danger Crue Records on February 10, 1989. It was instantly successful, having to be reissued three times that year alone and has sold over 40,000 copies. The 1991 release reached number 25 on the Oricon Albums Chart and charted for 5 weeks.

== Background and release ==
Having completed their final lineup in July 1988 with the joining of vocalist Kyo, D'erlanger began recording their first album in October. Drummer Tetsu said the band recorded the album in a single day. He also recalled that producer Masahiro Ohishi threatened that if he took too long to record his drum parts, he would bring in Joe from 44Magnum to play them. La Vie En Rose was released on February 10, 1989 via Danger Crue Records. Its sound was a drastic departure from their previous material, being punk and alternative rock instead of the speed and power metal they originally had. Explaining his goal before joining the band, Kyo said that he had been looking to merge the rock and roll of bands like Generation X, the Sex Pistols and Hanoi Rocks, with the atmosphere of Japan, but did not know how to do it, and "that's when D'erlanger came to my rescue".

The first press of 3,000 copies sold out by pre-order alone, so another press was made just 11 days later, which had a different cover. That version was reissued one month later on March 21. On December 10, another press was released in two covers; the original and another new one. On April 21, 1991, one more different cover version was released that would become the cover used on all future reissues. La Vie En Rose was remastered, along with their second album Basilisk, and released on April 21, 1995. It, along with the rest of the band's albums, was remastered and released again on April 18, 2007.

The arrangement for all tracks is credited to guitarist Cipher, except "1999 ~Shyboy Story~" and "Lullaby", which are credited to Cipher and Jimmy of 44Magnum. A demo of "Sadistic Emotion" with original drummer Shi-Do and second vocalist Dizzy was previously released in 1987. A version of "Lullaby" titled "Lullaby -1990-" was released as a single on September 5, 1990, it included a ballad version of the song as a b-side.

== Reception ==
La Vie En Rose has sold over 40,000 copies. The 1991 release of the album reached number 25 on the Oricon Albums Chart and charted for 5 weeks.

In a contemporary review for Rockin'f magazine, Yukinobu Hasegawa wrote that listeners familiar with D'erlanger's 1987 single "Girl" will be very surprised by La Vie En Rose's drastically different musical style. Describing it as barely retaining any heavy metal elements, he found the beat-driven rhythms reminiscent of Boøwy and called the vocal melodies so catchy they could be mistaken for pop songs. Although noting that the band had yet to fully develop the style, Hasegawa called it an innovative album and praised the song arrangements.

In a retrospective review, Tomoyuki Hokari of OK Music described the music of La Vie En Rose as taking aspects from beat rock like Boøwy and mixing it with metal like 44Magnum. He called the lyrics written by Cipher "romantic", and those written by Kyo "decadent." Hokari wrote that every song on the album is catchy and "melodious", which he attributes to Cipher's "extraordinary" ability to create melodies.

== Legacy ==
Hokari wrote that La Vie En Rose had considerable influence on future rock bands, particularly those in the visual kei scene. Dir En Grey guitarist Die said he got his love of guitar from the album.

The title track of La Vie En Rose was reworked into "Bara Iro no Jinsei" for D'erlanger's second album Basilisk, which also included an acoustic arrangement of "I Can't Live Without You".

Mucc later covered "La Vie En Rose", featuring Kyo, for their 2006 Cover Parade album. The extended version of "An Aphrodisiac" originally on their 1990 single "Darlin'", and two different versions of "Lullaby", one titled original and another the ballad rendition from "Lullaby -1990-", appear on D'erlanger's 2007 greatest hits album Pandora. Their 2010 self-cover album A Fabulous Thing in Rose includes new re-recordings of "La Vie En Rose" (two versions, one being in English), "An Aphrodisiac" (two versions, one being a trance rock mix), "Lazy Sleazy", and "Sadistic Emotion".

For 2017's D'erlanger Tribute Album ~Stairway to Heaven~, "Under the Pretense" was remixed by Yow-Row from Gari, "La Vie En Rose" was covered by Hyde featuring Cipher, Seela and Tetsu, "1999 ~Shyboy Story~" by The Slut Banks, "Sadistic Emotion" by Kiyoharu, "An Aphrodisiac" by Justy-Nasty, and "Lullaby" by a one-off group of Inoran, Teru, Hisashi, Pierre Nakano (Ling Tosite Sigure) and Ery (Raglaia).

== Track listing ==
All music is composed by Cipher, except "Under the Pretense", composed by Cipher, Kyo and Poppo.

No.	Title	Lyrics	Length
1.	"Under the Pretense"		00:59
2.	"La Vie En Rose"	Cipher	03:52
3.	"1999 ~Shyboy Story~"	Kyo	03:16
4.	"Dear Secret Lover"	Cipher	03:45
5.	"Sadistic Emotion"	D'erlanger	04:37
6.	"An Aphrodisiac"	Kyo	02:28
7.	"Indecent-Two-Persons"	Cipher	03:42
8.	"Lullaby"	Cipher	03:33
9.	"I Can't Live Without You"	Cipher	03:34
10.	"Lazy Sleazy"	Kyo	04:09

== Personnel ==
D'erlanger

- Kyo – vocals
- Cipher – guitar
- Seela – bass
- Tetsu – drums

Other

- Mayumi "Poppo" Kaneko – keyboards
- Masahiro Ohishi – producer, engineer
- Kohki Fukui – assistant engineer
- Makoto Kondo – mastering
