= Basilisk (D'erlanger album) =

Studio album by D'erlanger
- Released: March 7, 1990
- Recorded: November 1, 1989–January 16, 1990
- Studios: Sound Sky, Studio Key-Stone, Kazuhiko Kato Studio, Yamaha Ongakukobo AV Recording
- Genres: Gothic rock; post-punk; alternative rock; punk rock
- Label: BMG
- Producer: D'erlanger

D'erlanger chronology
La Vie En Rose (1989)	Basilisk (1990)	Lazzaro (2007)

Basilisk is the second album by Japanese rock band D'erlanger, released on March 7, 1990. It was their first on a major record label, reached number 5 on the Oricon Albums Chart, and charted for 8 weeks. It was also their last album before they disbanded at the end of the year, although they have since reunited and released Lazzaro in 2007.

== History ==
Kyo recalled being surprised when, after arriving to start recording the album, the producer brought out a computer. He had never used one to record before.

Basilisk was remastered, along with La Vie En Rose, and released on April 21, 1995. It, along with the rest of the band's albums, was remastered and released again on April 18, 2007. The arrangement for all tracks is credited to D'erlanger, except "So..." which is credited to D'erlanger and Satoshi "Jimmy" Hirose of 44Magnum, and "Bara Iro no Jinsei" which is credited to D'erlanger and Dahlia.

"Bara Iro no Jinsei" is a re-worked version of the title track from La Vie En Rose, and "I Can't Live Without You" was originally on their first album as well. The single version of "Darlin'" is slightly different than the album's. The single "Lullaby -1990-" includes part of "Moon and the Memories", titled "Moon and the Memories #2", as a b-side. Incomplete versions of "Darlin'" and "Crime & Punishment" appear on D'erlanger's 2007 greatest hits album Pandora. Their 2010 self-cover album A Fabulous Thing in Rose includes new re-recordings of "Incarnation of Eroticism", "Sad Song", "So...", "Moon and the Memories", and "Darlin'".

== Reception ==
Basilisk reached number 5 on the Oricon Albums Chart, and charted for 8 weeks. By the middle of 1990, it had sold 100,000 copies.

Jamie Cansdale of Kerrang! included Basilisk on a 2021 list of 13 essential Japanese rock and metal albums. He wrote that with "shades of Joy Division goth euphoria" and Kyo's David Sylvian-esque vocals, its "velveteen hymns engulfed a generation with a burgeoning erogenous intensity the scene has seldom seen since."

For 2017's D'erlanger Tribute Album ~Stairway to Heaven~, "After Image" was covered by acid android featuring Kyo, "Darlin'" by Psycho le Cému, "Moon and the Memories" by Dezert, and "So..." by Merry.

== Track listing ==
All lyrics are written by Kyo, except where noted; all music is composed by Cipher, except where noted.

No.	Title	Lyrics	Music	Length
1.	"Hurts"		D'erlanger, Dahlia	2:23
2.	"Incarnation of Eroticism"			2:52
3.	"Crime & Punishment"			3:55
4.	"After Image"			5:30
5.	"Sad Song"			4:46
6.	"Darlin' (Album Version)"			4:44
7.	"Moon and the Memories"			6:28
8.	"So..."		Satoshi Hirose	4:11
9.	"I Can't Live Without You (Acoustic Version)"	Cipher		5:35
10.	"Bara Iro no Jinsei"	Cipher		4:37

== Personnel ==
D'erlanger

- Kyo – vocals
- Cipher – electric and acoustic guitar, backing vocals
- Seela – bass, backing vocals
- Tetsu – drums, percussion, backing vocals

Other

- Yoshiko Kawakita – voice on track 1
- Hoppy Kamiyama – keyboards on tracks 8 & 10
- Dahlia (Shinobu Narita and Hiroaki Sugawara) – co-producer, "additional musicians"
- Michio Nakakoshi – engineer
- Daisuke Nakayama – engineer on track 9
- Yoshiaki Ushizawa – mastering
