= Hisashi (musician) =

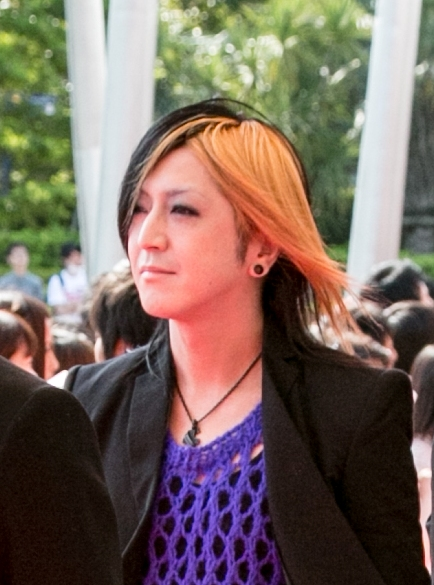
- Hisashi at the 2014 MTV Video Music Awards Japan

Background information
- Born: Hisashi Tonomura; February 2, 1972 (age 54); Hirosaki, Aomori, Japan
- Genres: Rock
- Occupations: Musician
- Instrument: Guitar
- Years active: 1986-present
- Labels: Toshiba-EMI; Capitol Records
- Member of: Glay; rally; Ace of Spades

Hisashi Tonomura (外村 尚, Tonomura Hisashi; born February 2, 1972), better known by his stage name HISASHI, is a Japanese musician best known as the lead guitarist of the rock band Glay. He is particularly associated with the brand Tokai, designing a series of personal signature guitars, based on their Talbo model.

== Biography ==
=== History ===
Hisashi was born in Hirosaki, Aomori, the second of two sons; his father was a surgeon. His family moved north to Hakodate, Hokkaido, by the time he began secondary school. As an adolescent and young teen, Hisashi took an interest in post-punk and metal bands, particularly influenced by Boøwy and X Japan. He states that when he first asked his parents for a guitar, it was given in confidence as it was the first thing he had truly wanted. He began studying guitar independently from that time and is a self-taught guitarist. He later produced collaborative tracks with many of his early influences.

At age 17, Hisashi witnessed the sudden fatal collapse of his father, an incident Hisashi cites as his departure from childhood. Before becoming successful, Hisashi worked in various part-time jobs including at a gaming center and a convenience store, while meeting to perform in live houses during the night. Hisashi first became familiar with Takuro and Teru as the two were a year above him in school and shared his interest in the local indie scene. Takuro sought Hisashi as a guitarist for Glay but he found Glay's music unappealing at the time because of their many pop and love songs. He had also gained a small following in another band, Ari (蟻, Ant), which better suited his own taste in heavy punk and experimental music. He claims that their performances were largely improvised, with the vocalist sometimes only screaming and throwing chairs. When Ari disbanded, Hisashi agreed to accompany Takuro and Teru, and after graduation relocated with them to Tokyo.

Hisashi has been a cover model on various magazines including guitar-oriented publication GIGS and fashion-oriented publication Silver Accessory, and is well known for his continually evolving personal style. Together with his bandmate Jiro, the two are particularly known for their visual kei looks and on-stage theatrics, however, in recent years the pair have toned down their image, sporting more contemporary clothing and hairstyles.

== Songs by Hisashi ==
In addition to arranging the guitar lines and solos for all of Glay's songs, Hisashi is the second most active songwriter and lyricist for Glay, after Takuro. Songs written by Hisashi often display strong punk and electronic influences and his lyrics are typically more abstract and metaphorical than those of Takuro and the other members. He has also contributed a variety of instrumental tracks for the band's albums and live performances. In 2011, his track "EverKrack" was the first of his songs to be given an official music video. His next official video was in 2016, a fully animated production "Kanojo wa Zombie" for their single "G4・IV", which reached #1 on the Oricon singles chart on his 44th birthday.

- 1995: "Cynical" (c/w "Ikiteku Tsuyosa")
- 1996: "Neuromancer" (c/w "a Boy ~zutto wasurenai~")
- 1998: "AI" (c/w "Soul Love")
- 1998: "Doku Rock" (c/w "Be With You")
- 2000: "Surf Rider" (c/w "Missing You")
- 2000: "Denki Iruka Kimyou na Shikou" (album One Love)
- 2000: "Prize" (album One Love)
- 2002: "Giant Strong Faust Super Star" (c/w "Mata Koko de Aimashou")
- 2002: "Brothel Creepers" (c/w "Aitai Kimochi", cowritten with Takuro)
- 2003: "17ans" (album Rare Collectives vol.2)
- 2003: "17bars" (album Rare Collectives vol.2)
- 2003: "I'm yours (Knightmare Mix '99)" (album Rare Collectives vol.2 remixed by Hisashi)
- 2004: "coyote, colored darkness" (album The Frustrated)
- 2004: "The Frustrated" (album The Frustrated, cowritten with Takuro under the pseudonym "Kombinat-12")
- 2004: "High Communications" (album The Frustrated, cowritten with Takuro under the pseudonym "Kombinat-12")
- 2007: "World's End" (album Love is Beautiful)
- 2009: "chronos" (single Say Your Dream)
- 2009: "Burning chrome" (album The Great Vacation Vol.1 SuperBest of Glay)
- 2009: "Synchronicity" (album The Great Vacation Vol.1 SuperBest of Glay)
- 2009: "Tokyo vice terror" (album The Great Vacation Vol.2 SuperBest of Glay)
- 2009: "1988" (album The Great Vacation Vol.2 SuperBest of Glay)
- 2010: "Kaze ni Hitori" (album Glay)
- 2011: "everKrack" (single G4・II -The Red Moon-)
- 2011: "Kaie" (mini-album Hope and The Silver Sunrise)
- 2013: "gestalt" (album Justice)
- 2014: "PAINT BLACK!" (single BLEEZE - G4 ・ III )
- 2014: "Mousou Collector" (album Music Life)
- 2015: "Binetsu A girl summer" (single Heroes)
- 2016: "Kanojo wa Zombie" (single G4・IV)
- 2016: "DEATHTOPIA" (single Deathtopia)
- 2016: "SUPERSONIC DESTINY" (single Deathtopia)

== Other works ==
Hisashi formed the side-band Rally with Teru (Glay), Kouji Ueno (The Hiatus and ex-Thee Michelle Gun Elephant) and Motokatsu Miyagami (The Mad Capsule Markets). The band recorded the song "Aku no Hana" for Parade -Respective Tracks of Buck-Tick-, a tribute album to Buck-Tick. They have played in festivals. In 2012, Hisashi formed another collaborative side-project, Ace of Spades, releasing a single "Wild Tribe" and performing limited gigs. In 2013, Hisashi composed and recorded the theme "Monochrome Overdrive" to be used in the anime television series Z/X Ignition.

He has been featured in works by other musicians: Yukinojo Mori's Poetic Revolution (track "Ango", with Takuro and Teru), "Letters", by Hikaru Utada, "Say Something", from the album In the Mood, and "Keep the Faith", from the album JUST MOVIN' ON～ALL THE -S-HIT, both by Kyosuke Himuro. On December 12, 2008, Hisashi was the special guest in the Blue Man Group show "Rock Day"; they played "Time to Start" and Glay's song "However". He featured as a guest musician on the BiS album "WHO KiLLED IDOL?", playing guitar on the song "primal.2". The song is a sequel to "primal." from 2011, which Hisashi praised highly on Twitter at the time of its release.

In 2004, Hisashi made a short cameo appearance with Takuro in the movie Casshern. From 1999 to 2007, he hosted a seasonal weekly radio program entitled Cyber Net City: Hisashi's Radio Jack on FM Fuji. In January 2009, he launched a regular TV program, RX-72: Hisashi vs Mogi Jun'ichi, which is shown on the third Monday of each month on channel Music On! TV with cohost Mogi Jun'ichi. The program has been released on a series of DVDs.

In 2017 he teamed up with Teru, Inoran, Pierre Nakano (Ling Tosite Sigure) and Ery (Raglaia) to cover "Lullaby" by D'erlanger for the D'erlanger Tribute Album ~Stairway to Heaven~. In 2018 he teamed with Yow-Row (Gari) to cover "Doubt" for the June 6, 2018 hide tribute album Tribute Impulse.
