= Frontiers (Psycho le Cemu album) =

Album by Psycho le Cému

Studio album by Psycho le Cému
- Released: 2003
- Label: Nippon Crown

Psycho le Cému chronology
Prism (2002)	Frontiers (2003)	Beautiful World' (2004)

Frontiers is a music album released by the Japanese music group Psycho le Cému by Nippon Crown. The CD contains "VISITOR", the ending theme to the anime コロッケ!(Croquette!).

Kerrang! noted about the album, "Roaming the outer reaches of an anime supernova, Psycho le Cému’s Frontiers dared to embody multiple personalities, bridging the scene’s triumphant past with an uncertain future."

== Track listing ==
1. 輝きの中へ… (Kagayaki no Naka e)
2. 激愛メリーゴーランド (Gekiai Merry-Go-Round)
3. 春夏秋冬 (Shunkashuutou)
4. 浪漫飛行 (Roman Hikou)
5. VISITOR
6. Mind Core
7. 凛～愛する者のために～(Rin~aisuru mono no tame ni~)
8. 銀狼 (Gin Ookami)
9. DANCE II HEAVEN
10. BLUE AGAIN
11. 一億のパルチザン(Ichioku no Partisan)
12. With
13. アクエリア (Hard Style)(Aquaria (Hard Style))
14. 愛の唄 (New Mix) (Ai no Uta (New Mix))

== Notes ==
The first press of the album came with a random figurine of one of the band members in their costumes from the "Ai no Uta" single.

Several songs were previously released as singles: Gekiai Merry-Go-Round and Shunkashuutou originally appeared on the Gekiai Merry-Go-Round/Shunkashuutou single; Roman Hikou and BLUE AGAIN appeared on the Roman Hikou single. VISITOR was released on a single under the alias of サイコロ・コロッケ(Saikoro Korokke) containing the opening and ending themes of the anime コロッケ！(Croquette!). Ai no Uta and Aquaria were previously released on the Ai no Uta single, but the versions that appear on the album are new remixes.

One PV was made for the album, for the song "With".
