= Acid Android =

Is the solo project of Yukihiro

- Origin: Japan
- Genres: Industrial rock; alternative dance; EBM
- Years active: 2001–present
- Label: Tracks on Drugs
- Members: yukihiro
- Website: www.tracksondrugs.com

Acid Android (stylized as ACID ANDROID and formerly as acid android) is the solo project of yukihiro, drummer of the Japanese rock band L'Arc-en-Ciel. While yukihiro provides the vocals and many of the instruments himself, he also utilizes many support and guest musicians both in the studio and in live performances. The project is signed to yukihiro's Tracks on Drugs record label. To date Acid Android has released four albums and two mini-albums. The band, in contrast to L'Arc-en-Ciel, uses a harder, faster sound, more stage-lighting and mechanics to further energize their concerts.

== History ==
The band made their debut with a self-titled album in 2002. The EP Faults features Toni Halliday on vocals and appeared in 2003. The album Purification was released in 2006 with other band members contributing to the songs. Two releases appeared in 2010, the album 13:Day:Dream and the seven-track mini album Code. For 2017's D'erlanger Tribute Album ~Stairway to Heaven~, Acid Android covered "After Image" featuring D'erlanger's own Kyo. They covered "Electric Cucumber" for the June 6, 2018 hide tribute album Tribute Impulse.

== Members ==
Current

- yukihiro – vocals, bass, keyboards, synthesizers, sampler (2001–present)
- Daigo Yamaguchi – drums (2012–present)
- Kazuya – guitar (2016–present)

Former

- tomo – guitar (2002–2006)
- antz – guitar (2003–2011)
- kishi – guitar (2006–2011)
- Kent – guitar (2012, 2014–2017)
- Yusuke Kobayashi – guitar (2012–2013, 2017–2018)
- Yasuo – drums, percussion (2006–2012)
- hiruma – drum machine, synthesizers, sampler (2002–2006)

== Discography ==
=== Studio albums ===
- Acid Android (September 25, 2002)
- Purification (May 5, 2006) Oricon Albums Chart peak: 22
- 13:Day:Dream (July 13, 2010) 28
- Garden (2017 Mix: November 24, 2017; 2018 Mix: April 4, 2018) 77

=== Mini-albums ===
- Faults (March 12, 2003) 67
- Code (October 27, 2010) 46

=== Singles ===
- "Ring the Noise" (September 27, 2001, released under the name "yukihiro") Oricon Singles Chart peak: 9
- "Let's Dance" (April 5, 2006) 17
- "The End of Sequence Code" (November 24, 2014, digital-only)
- "Roses / Ashes" (October 20, 2017, digital-only)

=== Home videos ===
- Acid Android Live 2003 (March 3, 2004)
- Acid Android Tour 2006 (November 22, 2006)
- Acid Android Live 2010 (February 23, 2011)
- Acid Android Live 2011 (December 14, 2011)
