= The Price of Being a Rose is Loneliness =

Studio album by D'erlanger
- Released: April 30, 2008
- Genre: Alternative rock; gothic rock; hard rock
- Label: Cutting Edge

D'erlanger chronology
Lazzaro (2007)	The Price of Being a Rose is Loneliness (2008)	D'erlanger (2009)

The Price of Being a Rose is Loneliness is the fourth album by Japanese rock band D'erlanger, released on April 30, 2008. It reached number 22 on the Oricon chart. The limited edition had a different cover and came with a DVD of music videos for "Zakuro" and "XXX for You" (from their previous album Lazzaro), and the making of "Zakuro".

== Track listing ==
1. "Eloa"
2. "Kagemai" (影舞)
3. "Taboo"
4. "Public Poison #9"
5. "Parfum de L'avidite'"
6. "Opium"
7. "Dancin'g with Lilly"
8. "Blanc -Cheres Roses-"
9. "Blanc -Cheres Douleur-"
10. "Maria"
11. "Zakuro" (柘榴)
12. "Amaoto"
13. "Elod - Symphony 4 Incarnation of Eroticism"
