= Dacco =

Japanese visual kei rock band

- Origin: Japan
- Genre: Pop
- Years active: 2005 – present
- Label: Sony Music Japan
- Spinoff of: Psycho le Cému
- Members: Lida; Yura
- Website: dacco.life

Dacco is a Japanese visual kei band which performs choreographed aerobics on stage. It was formed by former Psycho le Cému members, Lida and YURA-sama.

Most of the band's songs consist of acoustic guitar (usually played by Lida) and tambourine (played by YURAサマ). Also whenever the duo are seen as Dacco they always wear black (Lida) and white (YURAサマ) suits for contrast.

Dacco formed in 2005 after Psycho le Cému announced that they would be going on hiatus. Their first release came in the form of a 3 track single named コイガオカ (Koi ga oka). Shortly after this release the duo went on tour with fellow ex-Psycho le Cému members AYA and seek (Who at the time were in the band ISABELLE under the SYNECTICS guise. Then on 2006/3/1 the band released their first full-length album named ベビー (Baby). Baby contained 11 tracks including a new mix of Koi ga oka. The majority of the album features an electronic pop sound which is different from the acoustic guitar and tambourine of their singles. Dacco then toured to support the new album, and played in the US for the first time at the San Diego Comic Convention (7/21/06 - 7/22/06).

In May 2007, Dacco signed a record contract with Sony Music Japan

== Members ==
- Lida - Guitar & Vocals
- YURAサマ - Percussion & Vocals

== Discography ==
=== Albums ===
- ベビー (Baby) (March 1, 2006)
- Tomorrow (August 2007)

=== Singles ===
- コイガオカ (Koi ga oka) (October 20, 2005)
- 向日葵 (Himawari) (July 12, 2006)
- 太陽の君にフォーリンラブ (Taiyou no Kimi ni Fall in Love) (December 4, 2006)
- Guts! 2014
