= D'erlanger (album) =

Studio album by D'erlanger
- Released: November 11, 2009
- Genres: Alternative rock; gothic rock; hard rock
- Label: Cutting Edge

D'erlanger chronology
The Price of Being a Rose is Loneliness (2008)	D'erlanger (2009)

D'erlanger is the self-titled fifth album by Japanese rock band D'erlanger, released on November 11, 2009. It reached number 19 on the Oricon chart. The limited edition came with a DVD of the music video for "Angelic Poetry" and other material. "Easy Make, Easy Mark" was a speed metal song the band wrote and played back in the 1980s. For 2017's D'erlanger Tribute Album ~Stairway to Heaven~, "Easy Make, Easy Mark" was covered by Dir En Grey.

== Track listing ==
1. "11Loss"
2. "Deracine" (デラシネ)
3. "Masquerade"
4. "Angelic Poetry"
5. "13 Danme no Tousui" (13段目の陶酔)
6. "Your Funeral My Trial"
7. "Singe et Insecte"
8. "Rose of Thanatos"
9. "Love/Hate"
10. "Easy Make, Easy Mark"
11. "Love Me to Death"
12. "Love Me to Death (In the Air)"
