= Lazzaro (album) =

Studio album by D'erlanger
- Released: March 14, 2007
- Genre: Alternative rock; gothic rock; hard rock
- Label: Cutting Edge
- Producer: D'erlanger

D'erlanger chronology
Basilisk (1990)	Lazzaro (2007)	The Price of Being a Rose is Loneliness (2008)

Lazzaro is the third album by the Japanese rock band D'erlanger, released by Cutting Edge on March 14, 2007. Their first release in 17 years, it reached number 32 on the Oricon chart.

An English version of "Dummy Blue" appeared on D'erlanger's 2010 self-cover album A Fabulous Thing in Rose. For 2017's D'erlanger Tribute Album ~Stairway to Heaven~, "Dummy Blue" was covered by Angelo and "XXX for You" by lynch.

== Track listing ==
All lyrics are written by Kyo, except track 2, lyrics by Cipher and Kyo; all music is composed by Cipher, except where noted.

No.	Title	Music	Length
1.	"Kain" (instrumental)	D'erlanger	3:15
2.	"Dummy Blue"		4:01
3.	"XXX for You"		3:58
4.	"Baby I Want You"		3:37
5.	"Divina Commedia"		3:59
6.	"Beauty & Beast"		2:53
7.	"Romeo & Juliet"		4:19
8.	"Alone"	Tetsu	3:25
9.	"Gekkō" (月光)		4:37
10.	"Maria"		4:43
11.	"Noir - C'est la vie"		2:13
12.	"Noir - D'amour"		4:25
13.	"Abel" (instrumental)	D'erlanger	0:58

== Personnel ==
D'erlanger

- Kyo – vocals
- Cipher – guitar
- Seela – bass
- Tetsu – drums

Other

- Hoppy Kamiyama
- Kei Kusama – on tracks 1 & 13
- Yasuyuki Hara – mixing engineer
- Masanobu Murakami, Ryo Watanabe, Kanako Hayashi, Yohei Takita – recording engineers
- Shigeo Miyamoto – mastering
