= Nona Reeves =

Japanese pop band

- Origin: Tokyo, Japan
- Genres: Shibuya-kei; pop rock; funk; soft rock
- Years active: 1995–present
- Labels: Giant Robot (Under Flower Records) (1996); Warner Music Japan (1997 - 2001, 2017 - 2021); Nippon Columbia (2002 - 2003); Tri-M → Tokuma Japan Communications (2004 - 2010); Billboard Records (2011 - 2016); Fly High Records; Crystal City; AKA-bounce; Daydream Park Records (2021 -Present)
- Members: Gota Nishidera; Kensuke Okuda; Shigeru Komatsu
- Past members: Shinobu Morooka; Koichi Oyama
- Website: nonareeves.com

Nona Reeves (ノーナ・リーヴス) stylized NONA REEVES is a Japanese pop band founded in 1995 by musicians Gota Nishidera, Kensuke Okuda and Shigeru Komatsu. The name Nona Reeves derives from the respective name and surname of Nona Gaye and Martha Reeves. In 1996 Nona Reeves released their debut album SIDECAR under the independent label Giant Robot a division of Under Flower Records. In 1997 Nona Reeves released their first major single GOLF after joining the Warner Music Japan label.

Following being signed to Warner the group released material consistently under various labels throughout the 1990s and 2000s. In 2009, following their eleventh album GO the group went on a four-year recording hiatus until 2013 with the release of Pop Station. Nona Reeves have continued to consistently release new recorded material since 2014.

== History ==
During his childhood, Gota Nishidera was enthralled by the works of Michael Jackson and George Michael of Wham! he had become a lover of western pop of the 1980s. When studying in high school Nishidera learned to play percussion and brass instruments and by the time he became enrolled in Waseda University he had become a skilled musician. Nishidera became a member of a musical circle consisting of numerous bands and musicians known as "Traveling Light". During this, Nishidera began working on his own solo project he called Nona Reeves with the first project being a song titled "Bird Song". Two other local musicians Kensuke Okuda and Shigeru Komatsu who also were among The Traveling Light circle and members of separate bands and became the first members of Nona Reeves along with two other local musicians.

In 1996, Nona Reeves was signed by Giant Robot Records a subsidiary of Under Flower. Under Giant Robot, they recorded their debut independent album SIDECAR which released on December 13, 1996

== Members ==
- Gota Nishidera (Lead Vocals)
- Kensuke Okuda (Guitar & Keyboard)
- Shigeru Komatsu (Drums & Vocals)

=== Past members ===
- Shinobu Morooka
- Koichi Oyama

== Discography ==
=== Singles and EPs ===
| Title | Release date | Label | Charts |
| Title | Release date | Label | Oricon |
|---|---|---|---|
| GOLF ep. | November 22, 1997 | Warner Music Japan | — |
| WARNER MUSIC ep. | March 25, 1998 | Warner Music Japan | — |
| BAD GIRL | August 25, 1999 | Warner Music Japan | — |
| STOP ME | November 10, 1999 | Warner Music Japan | — |
| MY LOVELY NONA | December 10, 1999 | AKA-bounce | — |
| LOVE TOGETHER | March 23, 2000 | Warner Music Japan | — |
| DJ!DJ! ~Todokanu omoi~(feat. YOU THE ROCK★) (DJ!DJ!~とどかぬ想い~(feat. YOU THE ROCK★)) | March 13, 2000 | Warner Music Japan | 67 |
| Love Together ~PaRappa the Rapper MIX~ (LOVE TOGETHER 〜パラッパラッパーMIX〜) | May 9, 2001 | Warner Music Japan | 74 |
| I LOVE YOUR SOUL | November 7, 2001 | Warner Music Japan | — |
| ENJOYEE!(YOUR LIFETIME) | August 21, 2002 | Nippon Columbia | — |
| Changin’ (feat. YOU THE ROCK☆) | July 2, 2003 | Nippon Columbia | — |
| NEW SOUL / RHYTHM NIGHT | June 23, 2004 | Tokuma Japan Communications | — |
| Tomei Girl EP (透明ガールEP) | July 21, 2005 | Tokuma Japan Communications | — |
| LOVE ALIVE | November 23, 2005 | Tokuma Japan Communications | 174 |
| Do_It_Again | December 3, 2008 | Tokuma Japan Communications | — |
| Daydream Park (Handsome Boy Technique Remix) | January 7, 2009 | Tokuma Japan Communications | — |
| Hey, Everybody! | February 4, 2009 | Tokuma Japan Communications | — |
"—" denotes items which failed to chart.

=== Studio albums ===
| Title | Release date | Label | Charts |
| Title | Release date | Label | Oricon |
|---|---|---|---|
| Sidecar | December 13, 1996 | Giant Robot (Under Flower Records) | — |
| Quickly | August 25, 1997 | Giant Robot (Under Flower Records) | — |
| Animation | February 5, 1999 | Warner Music Japan | — |
| Friday Night | December 10, 1999 | Warner Music Japan | — |
| Destiny | October 12, 2000 | Warner Music Japan | 64 |
| Nona Reeves | September 9, 2002 | Nippon Columbia | — |
| Sweet Reaction | July 23, 2003 | Nippon Columbia | 128 |
| The Sphynx | October 21, 2004 | Tri-M | 163 |
| 3×3 | February 22, 2006 | Tokuma Japan Communications | 180 |
| Daydream Park | February 14, 2007 | Tokuma Japan Communications | 117 |
| Go | March 4, 2009 | Tokuma Japan Communications | 143 |
| Pop Station | March 6, 2013 | Billboard Records | 80 |
| Forever Forever | June 4, 2014 | Billboard Records | 71 |
| Blackberry Jam | March 23, 2016 | Billboard Records | 65 |
| MISSION | October 25, 2017 | Warner Music Japan | 42 |
| Mirai | March 13, 2019 | Warner Music Japan | 44 |
| Discography | September 8, 2021 | Daydream Park Records | 41 |
"—" denotes items which failed to chart.

=== Live albums ===
| Title | Release date | Label | Charts |
| Title | Release date | Label | Oricon |
|---|---|---|---|
| HiPPY CHRiSTMAS / LiVE TWELVE | November 16, 2011 | Fly High Records | 176 |
| HIPPY CHRISTMAS/LIVE THIRTEEN | December 19, 2012 | Fly High Records | 275 |
| HiPPY CHRiSTMAS/LiVE FOURTEEN | January 29, 2014 | Fly High Records | — |
"—" denotes items which failed to chart.

=== Cover albums ===
| Title | Release date | Label | Charts |
| Title | Release date | Label | Oricon |
|---|---|---|---|
| "CHOICE" by NONA REEVES | June 8, 2011 | Billboard Records | 133 |
| "CHOICE II" BY NONA REEVES | June 6, 2012 | Billboard Records | 191 |
| "CHOICE III" BY NONA REEVES | November 5, 2014 | Billboard Records | 186 |

=== Remix albums ===
| Title | Release date | Label | Charts |
| Title | Release date | Label | Oricon |
|---|---|---|---|
| CHERISH! NONA REEVES THE REMIXES | November 7, 2001 | Warner Music Japan | — |
"—" denotes items which failed to chart.

=== Compilation albums ===
| Title | Release date | Label | Charts |
| Title | Release date | Label | Oricon |
|---|---|---|---|
| GREATEST HITS / BOOK ONE | December 19, 2001 | Warner Music Japan | — |
| free soul -free soul of NONA REEVES- | December 14, 2006 | Tokuma Japan Communications | — |
| WARNER MUSIC YEARS/THE BEST OF NONA REEVES 1997-2001 | June 8, 2011 | Crystal City | 204 |
| COLUMBIA & TOKUMA YEARS 2002 - 2009 | February 15, 2012 | Crystal City | 224 |
| POP’N SOUL 20～The Very Best of NONA REEVES | March 8, 2017 | Warner Music Japan | 46 |
| Billboard Best 2011-2016 | June 14, 2017 | Billboard Records | 147 |
"—" denotes items which failed to chart.
