= Personz =

Japanese rock band (1983-)

- Origin: Japan
- Genres: Rock, new wave
- Years active: 1983–present
- Labels: Toshiba-EMI; Hatch Entertainment; ZOE Corporation
- Members: Jill; Mitsugu Watanabe; Tsutomu Fujita; Takeshi Honda
- Past members: Tsukasa Tanaka
- Website: personz.net

Personz (Japanese: パーソンズ, Hepburn: Pāsonzu; styled as PERSONZ) is a Japanese rock band formed in 1983 by lead vocalist Jill, guitarist Tsukasa Tanaka, bassist Mitsugu Watanabe, and drummer Tsutomu Fujita. In 1992, Tanaka left the band and was replaced by Takeshi Honda.

== Members ==
=== Current members ===
- Jill (ジル) (vocals, lyrics)
- Mitsugu Watanabe (渡邉 貢, Watanabe Mitsugu) (bass)
- Tsutomu Fujita (藤田 勉, Fujita Tsutomu) (drum)
- Takeshi Honda (本田 毅, Honda Takeshi) (guitar)

=== Former members ===
- Eiji Tanaka (田中 詠司, Tanaka Eiji) (guitar)

== Discography ==
=== Singles ===
- RomanEsque-HeartAche [02.24.1988]
- Be Happy [07.21.1988]
- Can't stop the Love [09.21.1988]
- Dear Friends [02.21.1989]
- 7 Colors: Over the Rainbow [05.25.1989]
- Fallin' Angel～嘆きの天使～ [12.06.1989]
- True Love [10.23.1991]
- Future Star [05.12.1993]
- I Need You [11.17.1993]
- sayonaraは言わない [03.02.1994]
- 悲しみの天使 [06.01.1994]
- Venusの憂鬱 [11.16.1994]
- Stay as a friend ～友達のままで～ [03.01.1995]
- Tell Me Why [10.25.1995]
- Blue Heaven [05.09.1996]
- Open Sesame! [09.11.1996]
- Yume no Hate made mo [11.13.1996]
- River [02.25.1998]
- Dear Friends: 21st Version [02.09.2001]
- Singin' [09.26.2002]
- Heartsong 携帯サイトにての限定販売 [05.19.2006]
- Brave Heart [05.28.2008]
- The Only One [07.30.2008]

=== Albums ===
- [07.10.1986] Romantic Revolution (Mini album)
- [03.11.1987] Power-Passion (Mini album)
- [09.21.1987] Personz: 1st album
- [02.21.1988] RomanEsque-HeartAche (Mini album)
- [07.21.1988] Modern Boogie ~2nd album~
- [03.14.1989] No More Tears ~3rd album~
- [12.06.1989] Only Dreamers ~4th album~
- [12.08.1990] Precious? ~5th album~
- [12.04.1991] Move ~6th album~
- [12.09.1992] Singin' ~Best album~
- [12.16.1992] Romantic Revolution / Power-Passion
- [09.06.1993] The Show Must Go On ~7th album~
- [03.23.1994] Best Personz ~ Best album
- [04.20.1994] Sand Rose ~8th album~
- [12.01.1994] Best Personz II ~Best album
- [04.08.1995] Ours ~9th album~
- [09.27.1995] Generator ~ Mini Album
- [04.17.1996] Come Alive 1986-1995 ~ Live Album
- [10.10.1996] Guardian Angel ~1Oth album~
- [03.25.1998] Rain In My Heart ~11th album~
- [11.26.1998] Singinii ~best album~
- [10.20.1999] Departure! ~12th album~
- [03.16.2001] Apollo ~13th album~
- [10.23.2002] Coming Home ~14th album~
- [10.18.2002] Twin Very Best Collection ~Best album~
- [03.23.2003] 2002-11-22 Comealive - Live Album / Limited Edition 1000
- [02.25.2004] Fireball ~15th album~
- [02.25.2004] Mirrorball ~16th album~
- [11.29.2006] Amplifier ~17th album~
- [03.20.2008] 2008-01-14 Comealive - Live Album
- [10.22.2008] Heart of Gold ~18th album~
- [10.21.2009] Personz Ultimate Hits ~ Baidis Years - Best Album
- [10.20.2009] BOØWY meets Personz ~ Boys, Will Be Boys - Album Cover
- [10.20.2009] BOØWY meets Personz ~ Girls, Will Be Girls - Album Cover
- [06.23.2010] Rockatherapy ~19th album~

=== Books ===
- [03.20.1988] Personz Sukoahausu / ISBN 978-4-915591-89-1
- [10.20.1989] Personz No More Tears Sukoahausu / ISBN 4-88277-007-5
- [11.15.1989] Personz Modern Boogie Sukoahausu / ISBN 978-4-88277-009-1
- [04.30.1990] Personz Dreamers Only Sukoahausu / ISBN 4-88277-015-6
- [09.30.1990] Dreamers Kadokawa Shoten / ISBN 978-4-04-883268-7
- [10.10.1990] Personz Dear Friends Yokohama Arena Vol.I Sukoahausu / ISBN 4-88277-021-0
- [11.25.1990] Personz Dear Friends Yokohama Arena Vol.II Sukoahausu / ISBN 4-88277-022-9
- [12.04.1991] Lucky Star は曇らない Sukoahausu / ISBN 4-88277-022-9
- [04.30.1992] Personz Move Sukoahausu / ISBN 4-88277-043-1
- [06.15.1993] Personz Singin' Sukoahausu / ISBN four-88277-06
- [09.20.1993] Personz Romantic Revolution / Power-Passion Sukoahausu / ISBN 4-88277-064-4
- [02.24.1994] Personz The Show Must Go On Sukoahausu / ISBN 978-4-88277-067-1
- [02.10.1995] Personz 砂の薔薇 Sukoahausu / ISBN 4-88277-078-4
- [10.31.1995] Personz Ours Sukoahausu / ISBN 4-88277-087-3
- [12.24.2006] Jill's Salon Lucky Star は曇らない II Zoe Corporation

=== Video DVD ===
- [09.21.1988] We're Personz Can't Stop the Love
- [01.21.1990] 1.11.1.111,111 Dear Friends
- [11.30.1990] 7Colors [Over The Rainbow]
- [01.21.1991] Personz In 武道館
- [05.10.1991] Moments Documentary Film '90-'91
- [12.16.1992] Singin' Best Video Clips
- [07.05.1995] Live Video Ours
- [08.06.2003] ライブ帝国 Personz
- [02.25.2004] 2004-02-28 Comealive
- [03.03.2004] ライブ帝国 Personz II
- [07.08.2004] 2004-02-28 Comealive
- [01.26.2005] One Night Special Show at the Ballroom
- [04.18.2005] Rodeo Drive-Bootleg
- [06.24.2005] Rodeo Drive
- [03.24.2006] Dragon Lily
- [10.25.2006] Personz Unplugged Best (Live Album / CD + DVD)
- [10.27.2007] 2005-2007 Comealive-live! Live! Live!
- [12.29.2007] Personz Amplifier Best
- [05.01.2009] Personz 25th Anniversary "Gold" (Live Album (CD) / Live Video (DVD) / video documentation (DVD) 3 Disc)
- [02.25.2010] Personz 25th Anniversary Personz to Personz Tour 2009.11.29 ~Live Video (DVD)~

=== Anime soundtracks ===
- [03.02.1994] sayonaraは言わない (Never Say Goodbye) - ending song of YuYu Hakusho the Movie: Poltergeist Report
- [11.13.1996] 夢の涯てまでも (Until the Edge of the Dream) - ending song of Bakusō Kyōdai Let's & Go!!
