= Teru (singer) =

Japanese musician and singer (born 1971)

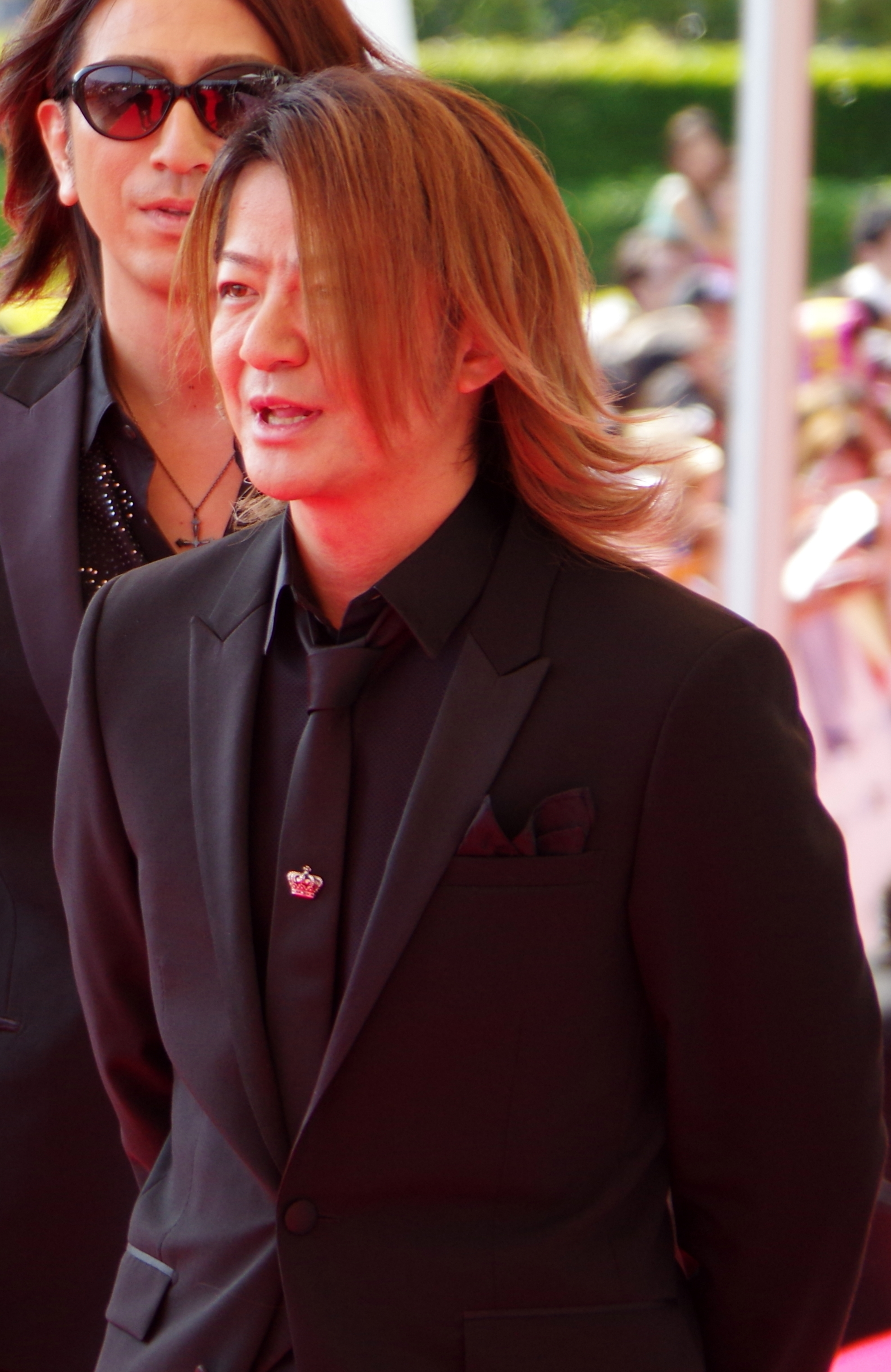
- Teru at the 2014 MTV Video Music Awards Japan

Background information
- Also known as: Teru
- Born: Teruhiko Kobashi; June 8, 1971 (age 55); Hakodate, Hokkaido, Japan
- Genres: Rock
- Occupations: Singer; musician
- Instruments: Vocals; drums; harmonica; guitar
- Years active: 1988-present
- Labels: Toshiba-EMI; Capitol Records
- Member of: Glay
- Formerly of: rally

Teruhiko Kobashi (小橋 照彦, Kobashi Teruhiko; born June 8, 1971 in Hakodate, Hokkaido), better known by his stage name TERU, is a Japanese musician and singer best known as vocalist of the rock band Glay, for which he was initially the drummer.

== Biography ==
=== History ===
He also founded the side-band rally, with Hisashi (Glay), Kouji Ueno (The Hiatus and ex-Thee Michelle Gun Elephant) and Motokatsu Miyagami (The Mad Capsule Markets). The band recorded the song "Aku no Hana" for Parade -Respective Tracks of Buck-Tick-, a tribute album to Buck-Tick. They've played in festivals.

Besides singing, Teru is also an artist. He does some design to Glay's products and some non-Glay related campaigns. He's also worked as a narrator for the animated movie "Highway Jenny", in 2006. As a child, he used to play soccer and baseball and believed he could become an athlete. However, as a teenager he became interested in music and started to play the drums.

Teru has been involved in several humanitarian campaigns as the White Band and the Red Ribbon Live. In 2007 and 2008 Teru starred an Ad Council Japan (AC) CM to show people of having the blood tested for HIV awareness.

In 2017 he teamed up with Hisashi, Inoran, Pierre Nakano (Ling Tosite Sigure) and Ery (Raglaia) to cover "Lullaby" by D'erlanger for the D'erlanger Tribute Album ~Stairway to Heaven~.

Teru hosts a radio show, "Teru Me Night Glay", on Bay FM.

=== Personal life ===
He married singer Ami Onuki from pop group Puffy AmiYumi in April 2002, and she gave birth to their daughter in March 2003. He has two other children, a boy and a girl, from a previous marriage.

== Songs by Teru ==
- ACID HEAD (from single "Zutto futari de...", lyrics written by Teru and Takuro, music by Takuro)
- Hello my life (from single "Winter, again" - lyrics written by Teru and Takuro, music by Takuro)
- Shuumatsu no Baby Talk (from album "BEAT out!" - music and lyrics)
- Little Lovebirds (from single "Yuuwaku" - music and lyrics)
- Rock Icon (from single "Mermaid" - lyrics written by Teru and Takuro, music by Takuro)
- Super Ball 425 (from single "STAY TUNED" - lyrics by Teru, music by Takuro)
- BACK UP (from single "STAY TUNED" - music and lyrics)
- BLAST (from album "THE FRUSTRATED" - music and lyrics)
- I Will~ (from album "LOVE IS BEAUTIFUL" - music and lyrics)

== Special features ==
- "Zero Landmine", song by "No More Landmine", with various musicians.
- "Love Clover", by Miho Nakayama
- "Ango", by Yukinojo Mori (álbum "Poetic Evolution")
- "Migratory Bird", by the Taiwanese band Mayday
- "Fuyuu no Etorage", by Misia (album "Singer for Singer")
- "Say Something", by Kyosuke Himuro (album "In The Mood")
- "Red Ribbon Spiritual Song: Umare kuru kodomotachino tameni", with Kazumasa Oda, Takuro, Miliya Kato and others
- "Still Love", by rapper MCU
- "Rakuyo", originally by Takuro Yoshida, arranged by Tak Matsumoto (album "The Hit Parade II")
