= High Kicks =

Studio album by The Blue Hearts
- Released: December 21, 1991
- Recorded: Avaco Creative Studio
- Genre: Punk rock
- Length: 52:25
- Language: Japanese
- Label: East West Japan
- Producer: The Blue Hearts

The Blue Hearts chronology
Bust Waste Hip	High Kicks	Stick Out

Singles from High Kicks
- 1. "Ano Ko ni Touch" Released: November 28, 1991; 2. "Too Much Pain" Released: March 10, 1992

High Kicks (ハイ・キックス, Hai Kikkusu) is the fifth studio album released by the Japanese band The Blue Hearts. It was the first album by the band to reach #1 on the Oricon charts.

== Tracks ==
1. "Minagoroshi no Melody" (皆殺しのメロディ Massacre Melody)
2. "Monkey" (M・O・N・K・E・Y)
3. "Kokoro no Kyūkyūsha" (心の救急車 Heart Ambulance)
4. "Ano Ko ni Touch" (あの娘にタッチ Touch That Girl)
5. "Homerun" (ホームラン)
6. "Nakanaide Koibito Yo" (泣かないで恋人よ Don't Cry, Lover)
7. "The Rolling Man"
8. "Tokyo Zombie" (東京ゾンビ)
9. "Happy Birthday"
10. "Tatakau Otoko" (闘う男 Fighting Man)
11. "Neon Sign" (ネオンサイン)
12. "Too Much Pain"
13. "Sasurai no Nicotine Yarō" (さすらいのニコチン野郎 Wandering Smoker)

== Songs ==
Though only two songs from this album were released as singles, both "Minagoroshi no Melody" and "Tokyo Zombie" were released as B-side tracks of the single "Yume", which was part of the band's sixth album, Stick Out.
