= Psycho le Cému =

Japanese visual kei rock band

- Also known as: Bad Boys, Be Ambitious!
- Origin: Himeji, Hyōgo, Japan
- Genre: Rock
- Years active: 1999–2006, 2009, 2015–present
- Labels: Limited Records, Crown, Pyramid of the Moon
- Members: Aya; Daishi; Lida; Seek; Yura-sama

Psycho le Cému (Japanese: サイコ・ル・シェイム, Hepburn: Saiko ru Sheimu) is a Japanese visual kei rock band formed in 1999. Its members are Aya, Daishi, Lida, Seek, and Yura-sama (Yuraサマ). Psycho le Cému distinguished themselves in the visual kei scene via their cosplay, with their members dressing in colorful, extravagant outfits inspired by anime and video game characters.

Psycho le Cému's cosplay inspired a dedicated niche fanbase, with fans who shared the band's interest in anime and cosplay, and some releases and events were done exclusively for members of Kronos, the band's fan club. The band creates a new set of costumes for each single. Promotional music videos often have storylines based on anime or literature. The band also performs as an alter-ego band called "Bad Boys, Be Ambitious!" Each Band member has their own personality in each character, as well as their own color scheme. Example: the Bassist “Seek” is usually the “monster” or “villain” of the story.

== History ==
Psycho le Cému formed in early 1999, and released their first maxi-single “Kronos” independently in March 2000. After playing a sold-out gig at Tokyo's famed visual-kei venue Rock May Kan, the band joined strong indie label Limited Records, who released their November 2000 maxi single “Risokyu Ryokou Guide Disc”. All 15 tour shows supporting this release were sold-out, including the finale at Shibuya's On Air West.

In September 2001, Psycho le Cému released their first album, Doppelganger, and began to play nationally and in larger venues. The group was managed by visual kei specialists Sweet Heart, who have also managed Luna Sea, Shazna, La'cryma Christi, Pierrot, and Plastic Tree.

In 2003, Psycho le Cému was signed by major Japanese label Crown, and their next two singles went into the top ten of Oricon's singles chart. In mid-2004 the band made appearances at Pacific Media Expo and Project A-kon and documented the trip in the form of the Psycho le Cému in USA Live & Document DVD, which was released in September 2004. The group also kept active in Japan, among other shows they appeared later that year at a festival sponsored by Japan's visual-kei oriented magazine Fool's Mate. The group returned to the States in early 2005 and performed at three anime conventions: Katsucon in Arlington, Virginia, Megacon in Orlando, Florida, and AOD: The San Francisco Animation Convention in San Francisco, California.

On May 31, 2005, singer Daishi underwent a urinalysis that showed up positive for methamphetamine and was arrested by Kanagawa police. When the story broke in the media, all of the band's merchandise was removed from shelves in Japan. Daishi's solo tour was cancelled, and his solo EP was removed from shelves. On June 5, the band announced via their official website that they would be on hiatus due to Daishi's arrest. On September 30, Daishi was sentenced to one year and ten months probation with a suspended sentence of three years by a court in Yokohama.

The members have formed side projects in the meantime; Aya and seek are in the band ISABELLE with three other musicians, and Lida and Yura-sama are in Dacco. They have ended their relationship with their label, Crown Records, as well as with their management, Sweet Child Entertainments, and are pursuing their projects independently. Aya was in Isabelle before Psycho le Cému formed, and re-formed the group for a tour and a live DVD in 2005. Seek and Aya are currently in the group Mix Speaker's,Inc., and Seek is an active blogger.

In May 2006 Psycho le Cému toured to support the release of new album ~Epilogue ~ Kataritsugareru Monogatari. In addition, all of the merchandise that had been pulled from store shelves was reinstated, and the Live in the USA II DVD, which was delayed due to Daishi's arrest, was finally released. Although as soon as the tour was over, Psycho le Cému went on what seemed to be a permanent hiatus.

Daishi, now freed from jail, started a single career. On March 21, 2007, he released God Japanese Monster, his first solo album, accompanied of a Japanese tour. In 2009, the group announced, through their Ameblo blog, "Psycho le Cemu will be going on a short tour to celebrate 10 years since their formation. The tour will be called 「Legend of Sword」, kicks off in June." As stated, Psycho le Cému members reunited again for the anniversary of the creation of the band with a tour called 10th Anniversary - Legend of Sword, with new costumes and, the tour started in June of that year.

In 2015, Psycho le Cému reunited for three 15th anniversary concerts on February 11, 14 and 15. Later, the group announced a new single, Akiramenai Days, which was released on September 16, 2015, as well as the return of the band.

In 2017, they covered "Darlin'" by D'erlanger for the D'erlanger Tribute Album ~Stairway to Heaven~.

== Members ==
Name	Real Name	Birthdate	Costume Role	Defining characteristics
Daishi - Lead Vocals	Daishi Kajinaga (梶永大士)	February 5, 1976	"The Hero"	Shortest band member
Aya - Guitar, dance	Naoki Okawa	March 17, 1980	"The girl"	Pink hair
Lida - Lead guitar	Tatsuya Akeda	January 16, 1976	Sidekick, "Whatever's left over".	Bright orange hair
Seek - Bass	Takuma Shiramizu	September 14, 1979	Monster	His many piercings
Yura-sama - Drums, vocals, dance	Takeshi Kuroiwa	September 12, 1979	Warrior, mystic	Platinum Hair

Musicians credits' are as per the liner notes of the group's own records. Yura-sama is always credited with vocals, although his only lead vocal spot is the song "Area" and "Janus", which he shares with Daishi, while Lida is never credited with vocals, although he raps a verse in many songs. All members may take backing vocals. Many songs have a pre-recorded or sequenced backing track, to which Aya and Yura-sama will do choreographed dance routines with hand-movements during live performances, called furitsuke (or furi for short), which in the past have often been mistakenly referred to as para para by international fans.

== Discography ==
- Doppelganger ~mou hitori no jibun~ (26 September 2000)
- Prism (mini-album) (17 July 2002)
- Frontiers (27 August 2003) - An original mini-figure was included with the first pressing
- Beautiful World ~Kono hitomi ni utsuranai mono~ (11 October 2004)
- Psycho le Cemu Best (Greatest Indies Hits) (26 April 2006)
- ~Epilogue ~ Kataritsugareru Monogatari - A card signed by all the members was included with the pre-orders between 20 February - 24 April (Only available through mail order in Japan) (15 May 2006)
- Psycho le Cemu Best (Greatest Major Hits) (23 August 2006)
- NOW AND THEN ~THE WORLD~ (17 August 2016)
- Light and Shadow (9 May 2018)
- Twenty Story (3 July 2019)
- Resistance (13 September 2023)

== Singles ==
- "-Kronos-" (21 March 2000)
- "Risoukyou ryokou Guide Disc" (22 November 2000)
- "A Trip to the Arcadia" (18 July 2001) - A double single disk set
- "Remembrance" (8 January 2002)
- "Ai no uta" (2 October 2002)
- "Gekiai Merry-Go-Round / Shunkashuutou" (16 January 2003)
- "Roman Hikō" (23 April 2003) - A limited first print had special packaging.
- "Miracle High Tension!" (21 May 2003)
- "A Trip to the Arcadia" (8 October 2003) - Re-Release
- "Omoide aruki" (18 February 2004)
- "Michi no sora" (9 June 2004)
- "Yume kazaguruma" (6 October 2004)
- "Love is Dead" (27 April 2005)
- "Akiramenai Days" (16 September 2015)
- "Ooedo Tabigarasu" (25 May 2016)
- "Fantasia ~Yuuki no Gensoukyoku" (14 December 2018)
- "Moichido Kuchizukewo" (25 August 2023)
- "Shirasagi" (28 December 2024)
- "ŚaktiŚaktiAsti" (9 June 2025)

== Demo Tapes ==
- Self Analysis (7 July 1999)
- Genesis (18 January 2001)
- Genesis (9 June 2001) - Re-release

== DVD ==
- Psycho le Cému Majikaru BOX (25 December 2003) - In addition to the DVD, it has five character figures of the band, a pen with a LED light, a traveling pouch, a "magical" towel, and a set of twelve post cards.
- Psycho le Cému in USA - LIVE & DOCUMENT - (15 September 2004) - Psycho le Cému's tour of two anime and manga conventions in Anaheim, California and Dallas, Texas.
- ~Risoukyou ryokou Zepp~ (9 March 2005) - Live footage from their January 2003 performance at Zepp Tokyo.
- Psycho le Cému in USA II (19 April 2006) - Psycho le Cému's second DVD of their U.S. tour which took place between February 18, 2005, and March 6, 2005. Includes concert footage and behind-the scenes video.
- Psycho le Cemu ~Saishuu Banashi~ Mata Aeru Sono Hi Made... ~EPILOGUE~ Kataritsugareru Monogatari - Two-disc DVD covering their last tour through Japan. (October 11, 2006).

== Books ==
- Psycho le Cému Magical Party Daihyakka (Magical Party Encyclopedia) (30 November 2003) - A compilation of Party #'s 1-31 that were organized by B-Pass magazine. Includes a bonus DVD of Party 26–31.
- The Magical Photograph Daizenshu (The Magical Photograph Collection) - (25 June 2004) - Psycho le Cemu's first photobook.
- Psycho le Cemu ~The birth of everyting [sic] ~ (October 2005) - An artbook of original drawings by Lida of all of PLC's indies costumes up to Gobou Hoshi Fantasy. Included with the book was a 2-song CD by Lida titled "CRIMSON."
