= Gota Nishidera =

Japanese musician and music producer (born 1973)

Gota Nishidera 西寺 郷太
- Born: 27 November 1973 (age 51); Tokyo, Japan
- Genres: J-pop; rock
- Occupations: Musician; singer-songwriter; lyricist; composer; music arranger; music producer; novelist; scriptwriter
- Instruments: Vocals; music sequencer; drums; electronic keyboard; guitar
- Years active: 1996–
- Labels: Billboard Records (as part of Nona Reeves); Gotown Records Vivid Sound (solo)
- Website: www.nonareeves.com

Gota Nishidera (西寺 郷太, Nishidera Gōta, born 27 November 1973, in Chiyoda, Tokyo) is a Japanese musician and music producer.

Nishidera is the singer and main songwriter of the band Nona Reeves, and also acts as a songwriter/composer, arranger, music producer, novelist, writer, MC for the band. He is president of Gotown Records.

Nishidera was raised in Kyoto, Kyoto Prefecture. He graduated from Kyoto Seihi High School and Waseda University Second Literature Department (Western Culture Seminar) in March 1996.

== Advertisement narrations ==
Year	Name	Brand
2008	docomo SH906i	Sharp Corporation
2009	"Sono Jinsei ni, īheya o"	House Mate
2009	"Hello, Idea"	Frisk
2010	"Nissan Cube"	Nissan
2012	"Wakuwaku ga Ie ni yattekuru"	IKEA
2013	"Snoopy Ten"	
2013	"Lawson Green Smoothie 'Chair Line Dance'"	

== TV appearances, specials, one-off guest programmes ==
Year	Title	Network
	Uta Sta!!	NTV
	Ariehen Sekai	TV Tokyo
	Onchiren	Space Shower TV
	Ryōzanpaku	Space Shower TV
	BS Netchū Yobanashi	NHK-BS2
	Hakase no Ijōna Teidan	Tokyo MX, tvk
2009	Yarisugi Cozy "Yarisugi Toshi Densetsu Special"	TV Tokyo
	Ore-tachi! Quiz Man	TBS
	Music Edge + Osaka Style	MBS
	SMAP×SMAP	Fuji TV
	"Pu'" Suma	TV Asahi
2010	Tetsuya Takeda no Shūkan Tetsu-gaku	Asahi New Star
2010	Suka Para	Sky PerfecTV!
2013	Hyakushikiō	Fuji TV
	Osamu Hayashi-sensei no Ima yaru! High School	TV Asahi
	Quiz Presen Variety: Q-sama!!	TV Asahi
	The Prime Show	WOWOW
2014	Tamori Club	TV Asahi
2015	Masahiro Nakai no Mi ni naru Toshokan	TV Asahi

== Regular programmes ==
Title	Network	Notes
WOWOW purasu to	WOWOW	MC

== Radio appearances ==
Year	Title	Network
	Come on Funky Lips! / Lips Part 21.jp	NCB
	Nona Reeves Gota Nishidera no tondemo nezumi / Gota Nishidera no Sexy You	FM Ishikawa
	Midnight Gong	FM Fuji
	Sub-stream / Nona Reeves "Summer Reaction"	FM Yokohama
	FM Rock Kids	Air-G
	Nona Reeves Gota Nishidera "Love Together"	FM Osaka
	Nona Reeves Gota Nishidera "Enjoy Your Lifetime"	InterFM
	Keiko Kojima Kira Kira Suiyōbi	TBS Radio
	Small Boys no DM Rock Kids	Air-G
	LiLi & Go no Ready go	NHK Radio 1
2013	Music 24/7	TBS Radio
2016	Tamao Akae tama musubi	TBS Radio

== Books ==
Year	Title	ISBN code
2009	Atarashī "Michael Jackson" no Kyōkasho	ISBN 978-4828415291
2010	Michael Jackson	ISBN 978-4062880459
2014	Uwasa no Melody Maker	ISBN 978-4594070656
2015	We Are the World no Noroi	ISBN 978-4140884676
2015	Prince Ron	ISBN 978-4106106347

== Contributions ==
Year	Title
2009	Who's Bad Michael Jackson 1958–2009 "Ani Marron Jackson no Speech"
2010	Brutus "Michael Jackson/Ichiro Ozawa hobo Dōitsujinbutsu-setsu"
2010	Uomo "Michael Jackson"
2010	Shūkan Kinyōbi
2011	Gekkan Bungeishunjū "Himetaru Koi"
2011	Gekkan Bungeishunjū "Saikyō Team no Hōsoku"
2012	Gekkan Bungeishunjū "Ā 'Dōkyūsei'"

== Serials ==
Title	Notes
Spa! "Nona Reeves Gota Nishidera '100-Byō de wakaru Pop Legend'"	
Meets Regional "Nona Reeves Gota Nishidera 'Gota Nishidera-san ga Ki ni naru, Kongetsu no 1-mai.'"	
Mutts "Nona Reeves Gota Nishidera 'German Minzoku Dai Idō'"	Ended
Oricon "Nona Reeves Gota Nishidera"	Ended
