= 44 Magnum (band) =

Japanese heavy metal band

- Origin: Osaka Prefecture, Japan
- Genres: Heavy metal; hard rock
- Years active: 1977–1989, 2002–present
- Labels: Moon, Invitation, Danger Crue, East West Japan
- Members: Paul; Jimmy; Joe
- Past members: Akira; Taka; Hirofumi; Teruki; Shuse; Ban; Stevie
- Website: Official site

44 Magnum (stylized as 44MAGNUM) are a Japanese heavy metal band, originally formed in Osaka Prefecture in mid-1977. They were one of the first Japanese metal bands.

== History ==
44 Magnum was originally formed in 1977 by vocalist Tatsuya "Paul" Umehara. After recruiting guitarist Satoshi "Jimmy" Hirose and bassist Hironori "Ban" Yoshikawa in 1979, the classic line-up was finalized when Satoshi "Joe" Miyawaki joined on drums in 1982. The band made their major label debut the following year with the album Danger. 1985's Four Figures was composed of solo songs by each of the four band members, and featured guest appearances by Tomoyasu Hotei (Boøwy), Akira Wada (Prism), Kenji Kitajima (Fence of Defense), Yoshiro Takahashi (Action) and Hoppy Kamiyama (Pink)

In 1987, the band changed record labels and shifted to a soft rock sound. The subsequent albums, Love or Money (1987) and Emotional Color (1988), were badly-received by fans. Joe left the band in 1988. 44 Magnum disbanded in April 1989. The album Still Alive was released later that month and features the band's classic heavy metal sound, as it was recorded in 1986.

After thirteen years, 44 Magnum reunited in 2002 and released their seventh album Ignition. Bassist Ban left the band in 2009. That year, they released a self-titled album featuring new members Shuse, formerly of La'cryma Christi, on bass and Stevie, Paul's son, as a lead singer alongside Paul on most of the tracks.

In early 2012, frontman and sole original member Paul announced he would stop performing live shows to focus on his treatment for Parkinson's disease, which he was diagnosed with in 2005. However, he continues to record and write songs with the band, and still makes occasional live appearances. Bassist Ban returned to 44 Magnum for the 30th anniversary of their debut in 2013.

On February 3, 2022, 44 Magnum announced that Ban was no longer a part of the band. A little over a week later, Sexx George of the band Ladies Room was announced as support bassist. After 17 years, Stevie announced his departure from 44 Magnum on May 7, 2026.

== Members ==
Current members

- Tatsuya "Paul" Umehara (梅原"PAUL"達也) – vocals (1977–1989, 2002–present)
- Satoshi "Jimmy" Hirose (広瀬"JIMMY"さとし) – guitar (1979–1989, 2002–present)
- Satoshi "Joe" Miyawaki (宮脇"JOE"知史) – drums (1982–1988, 2002–present)

Support members

- Anarchy Bad Ray – bass (2010)
- Sexx George – bass (2022–present)

Former members

- Akira Nagamori (永守晃) – guitar (1977–1981)
- Taka Tanaka (田中タカ) – bass (1977–1982)
- Hirofumi Miyamoto (前元博文) – drums (1977–1980)
- Teruki Iga (伊賀照幸) – drums (1979–1982)
- Shuse – bass (2009–2012)
- Hironori "Ban" Yoshikawa (吉川"BAN"裕規) – bass (1979–1989, 2002–2009, 2013–2022)
- Stevie Umehara – vocals (2009–2026)

Timeline

== Discography ==
Studio albums

- Danger (1983)
- Street Rock'n Roller (1984)
- Actor (1985)
- Love or Money (1987)
- Emotional Color (1988)
- Still Alive (1989)
- Ignition (2002)
- 44Magnum (2009)
- Angel Number (2015)
- Prisoner (2019)

EPs

- 44Magnum (1983)
- Four Figures (1985)
- Beast (2013)

Singles

- "It's Raining" (1987)
- "I Miss You" (1988)

Live albums

- The Live (1985, EP)
- Live Act II (1986)
- 2016 04 03 04 Special Live (2017)

Compilations

- Anthology (1989)
- Live & Rare (2000, 10-CD boxset)
- The Bootleg-MK.I (2001, 2CD & DVD)
- The Bootleg-MK.II (2011, CD & DVD)
- 44Magnum 35th Anniversary Ultimate Collection (March 21, 2012, SHM-CDs)

Includes Danger, Street Rock'n Roller, Actor, Live + Four Figures, Live Act II -Complete- and Ignition.

Videos

- The Beginning (1985)
- The Bootleg-MK.I (2001, DVD & 2CD)
- Live at Alive (2010)
- The Bootleg-MK.II (2011, DVD & CD)
- 44Magnum on 30th Anniversary Tour 2013 Bombard Attack (2014)
- Bombard Attack 44Magnum on Tour 2014 2014.10.18 Tokyo (2015)
- 2016 04 03 04 Special Live (2016)
