= Boøwy =

Japanese rock band

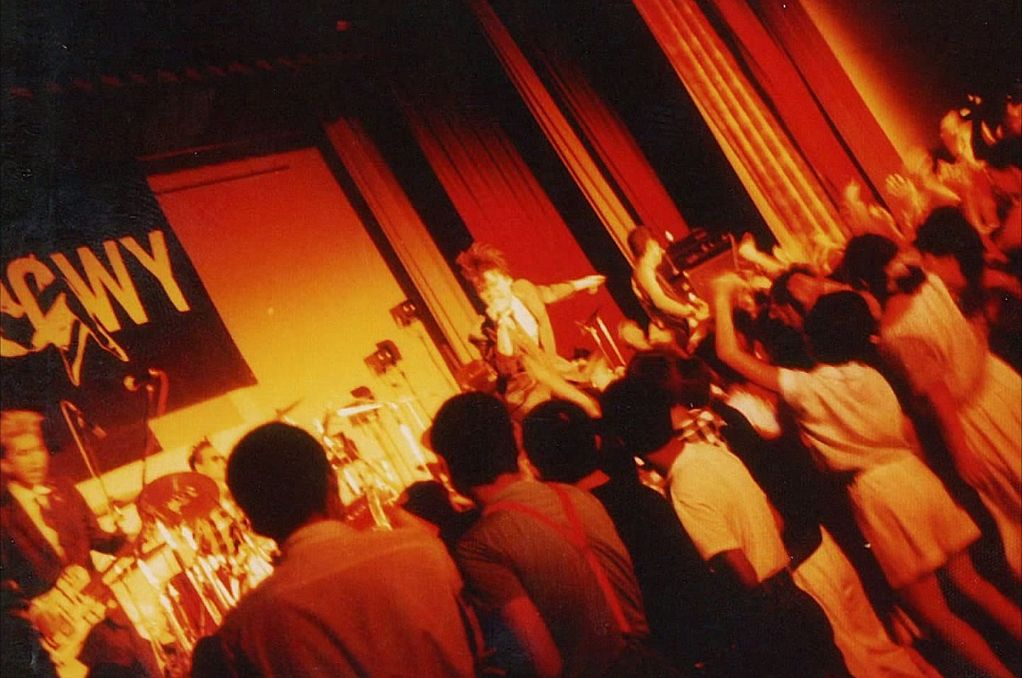
- Boøwy performing in Japan, 1984

Background information
- Also known as: Bōi (暴威)
- Origin: Takasaki, Gunma, Japan
- Genres: New wave; punk rock
- Years active: 1981–1988
- Labels: Victor/Invitation; Tokuma Japan; Toshiba EMI/East World
- Past members: Kyosuke Himuro; Tomoyasu Hotei; Tsunematsu Matsui; Makoto Takahashi; Mamoru Kimura; Kazuaki Fukasawa; Atsushi Moroboshi

Boøwy (/ˈboʊi/ BOH-ee; stylized as BOØWY) was a Japanese rock band formed in Takasaki, Gunma in 1981. The classic lineup of vocalist Kyosuke Himuro, guitarist Tomoyasu Hotei, bassist Tsunematsu Matsui, and drummer Makoto Takahashi reached legendary status in Japan during the 1980s.

In 1988, the year they broke up, they became the first male artists to have three number-one albums within a single year on the Oricon chart. They were named Artist of the Year at the 3rd annual Japan Gold Disc Awards in 1989. The late 1980s "Band Boom" in Japan is credited to Boøwy as they popularized the formation of musical groups. In 2003, HMV Japan ranked Boøwy at number 22 on their list of the "100 Most Important Japanese Pop Acts".

== History ==
=== 1980–1983: Early years and debut ===
In 1979, Kyosuke Himuro was in a band called Death Penalty which won Yamaha's East West '79 music contest held in his hometown of Takasaki, Gunma. In that same contest was Tomoyasu Hotei's band Blue Film, which came in second place. After the contest, Death Penalty signed with the record company Being Inc. and went to Tokyo. Things did not go as well as expected and they broke up. Himuro then joined Spinach Power, but he had problems with them as well. After attending an RC Succession concert at Hibiya Open-Air Concert Hall in the summer of 1980, Himuro resolved to form a new band.

Around the same time, Hotei was also in Tokyo after being expelled from high school for saying "Jesus had long hair" when his teacher warned him about his hair being too long. He received a phone call from Himuro and, even though they did not really know each other, they decided to start a band. In September, they recruited Tsunematsu Matsui on bass, Atsushi Moroboshi from Death Penalty on guitar, and Kazuaki Fukazawa from Blue Film on saxophone. Mamoru Kimura from Spinach Power agreed to drum for them in 1981. Their staff at Being Inc. originally conceived of naming the band "Boy", as a play on the British band Girl, but feeling it lacked visual impact, it was decided to write the name in kanji as Bōi (暴威), which was found on costumes that Kansai Yamamoto had designed for David Bowie.

To earn a living they started working part-time jobs and sent demo tapes to various record companies. They finally signed with the record company Victor and began recording their first album. In May 1981, Kimura left, as he originally joined the band on a temporary basis. He would later collaborate with the group again when he co-produced their second album. Makoto Takahashi was brought by a friend to watch Bōi perform their first concert at Shinjuku Loft on May 11, 1981. He was impressed and tried out for the band when he heard they needed a new drummer. During the summer of that year he replaced Kimura on drums and Bōi went on to become the most popular bands at the Loft.

The band's logotype, used since 1985

In January 1982, they changed their name to "BOØWY". The use of the "Ø" or "empty set" character, signifies the band's originality in that they "Belong nowhere, and resemble no one" (どこにも属さない、誰にも似ていない, Doko ni mo zokusanai, darenimo nite inai). On March 21, they released their first album, Moral. Because it was largely recorded during Kimura's tenure on drums, Takahashi only appears on two tracks. At this time they were a punk rock band. For their concert in Shibuya on September 9, Hotei wanted to take a different approach to their music and become more pop sounding, but the fans did not like the change. Fukazawa and Moroboshi mirrored the opinions of the fans and on October 9, after their performance at the Loft, they left the band and Boøwy became a quartet.

In 1983, Boøwy formed their own company φ-con'nection with Mamoru Tsuchiya, a former member of Blue Film, as their manager. At the time, this was unheard of and frowned upon in the music industry, so their record company stopped promoting them, leaving Boøwy with no other means of promotion but performing live. Tsuchiya faced an uphill battle in promoting them; with no funds, he gathered hand-made flyers, posters, character goods, the musical instruments and the band in an old Toyota HiAce with no AC and went on a trip around Japan looking for places to perform. The band was lax with allowing fan recordings of their performances, particularly in their early years, leading to many bootleg recordings being in circulation. Around the time of φ-con'nection's formation, the band coined the term "afrockabilly" to describe their music. On September 25, they released their second album, Instant Love, on Tokuma Japan.

=== 1984–1988: Success and breakup ===
At the end of May 1984, Boøwy relocated their base of operations from Shinjuku Loft to the larger Shibuya Live Inn with the first installment of their Beat Emotion concert series, which would continue monthly throughout the year. In July, they began a tour, also titled Beat Emotion, which lasted until December. Not wanting to go through the same hardship they faced in 1983, they decided to sign with the production company Yui in November, and signed to Toshiba EMI. On December 6, Himuro changed the spelling of his given name from "狂介" to "京介". The band then took a six-month break from touring. Boøwy performed in London, England, at the Marquee Club on March 12, 1985. Their self-titled third album was recorded at Hansa Tonstudio in West Berlin, Germany, produced by Masahide Sakuma, and released on June 21. Sakuma was chosen because Hotei was a big fan of his band the Plastics, and Sakuma's sole condition for agreeing was that it be recorded at Hansa. According to music critic Takashi Honda, Boøwy's June 25 concert at Shibuya Public Hall marked a turning point in their popularity, where the "punk spirit that defined their early years, glamorous theatricality, and an energy that sought to forge a new era while drawing upon the history of international rock" perfectly converged. The band started the Boøwy's Be Ambitious Tour in September, and it ran until December 1985.

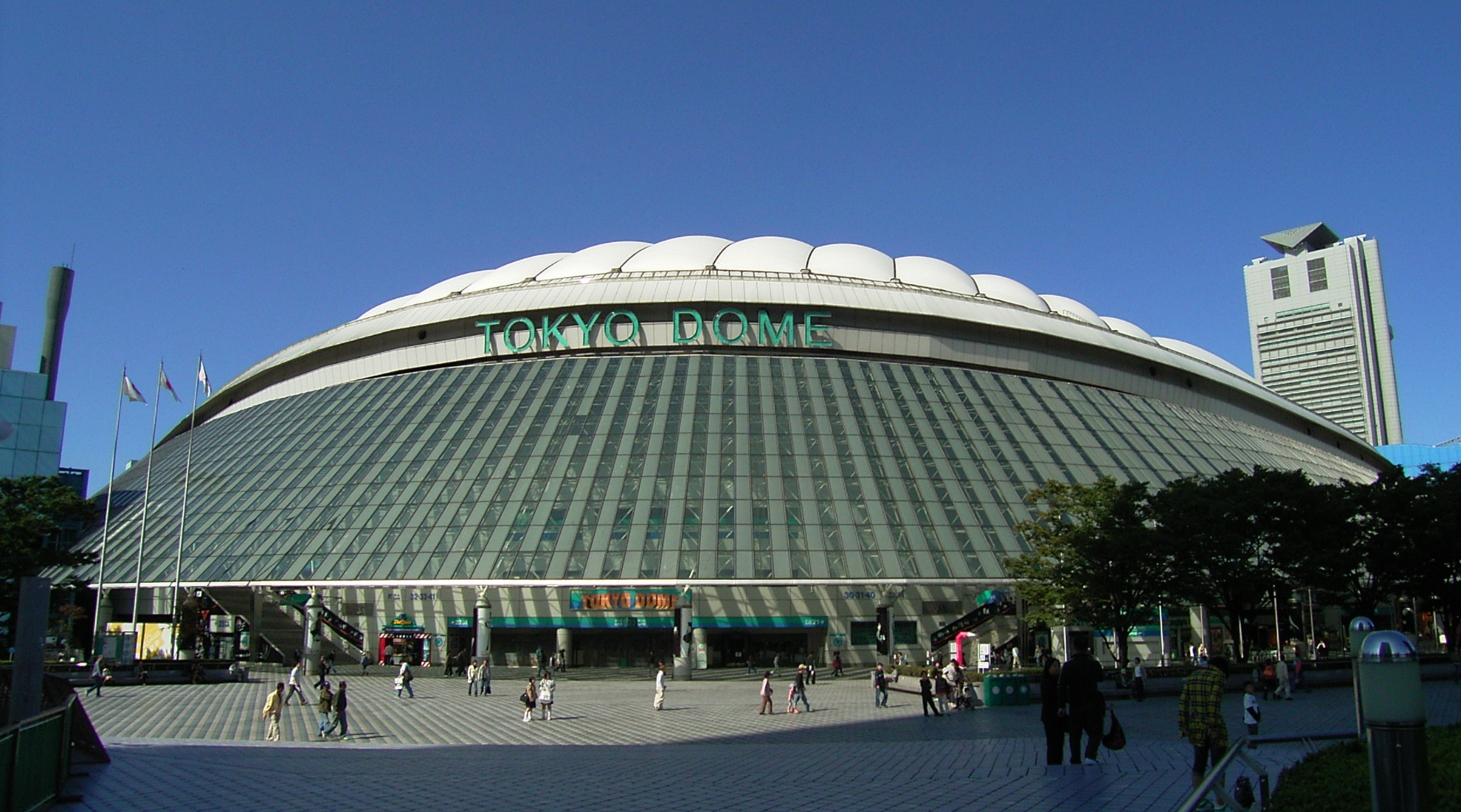
Boøwy performed their last two concerts at the newly-opened Tokyo Dome in April 1988.

1986 saw the band release two studio albums, Just a Hero in March and Beat Emotion in November. The former includes "1994 -Label of Complex-", which features Kōji Kikkawa as guest vocalist. Gota Nishidera later compared the magnitude of this collaboration to Bowie working with Queen on "Under Pressure". The Just a Hero Tour began in March and finished on July 2, with the band's first concert at the Nippon Budokan. Beat Emotion was recorded in a single month, in-between concert dates. It became Boøwy's first release to reach number one on the music charts. The 37-date Rock'n Roll Circus Tour, which began on November 11, 1986, was initially intended to feature a circus tent, but this was scrapped when the circus troupe mentioned a need for elephants.

The single "Marionette" was released on July 22, 1987, took the number one position and sold 230,000 copies, making it the 20th best-selling single of the year. The band held two concerts called Case of Boøwy at the World Memorial Hall on July 31 and at the Yokohama Cultural Gymnasium on August 7, where they played most of their songs from their debut to the present for four hours straight. They released what would be their final studio album, Psychopath, on September 5. It was followed by the Dr. Feelman's Psychopathic Hearts Club Band Tour, which would be their final tour. At its final concert, Shibuya Public Hall on December 24, 1987, Boøwy announced that they would be breaking up. There are many rumors concerning the breakup, but the most popular is the rift between Hotei and Himuro. An indication of the band's stature at the time, is that at their farewell concerts, appropriately titled Last Gigs; two nights at the newly-opened Tokyo Dome on April 4 and 5, 1988; they sold out all 95,000 tickets in ten minutes. A live album of the two shows was released just one month later on May 3.

=== 1989–present: Post-breakup ===
In 1989, Boøwy were named Artist of the Year at the 3rd annual Japan Gold Disc Awards. The band has had several number ones since disbanding, including; their 1988 Singles collection, 1998's This Boøwy which sold over 1.6 million copies to be certified 4× Platinum by the RIAJ, and the 2001 DVD of their final concerts.

On February 1, 2012, Hotei performed a concert at the Saitama Super Arena to celebrate his 50th birthday. Takahashi appeared as a special guest and together they played Boøwy's "Justy" and "No. New York". This was the first time the two performed together publicly in 24 years.

To celebrate Boøwy's 30th anniversary, the compilation album Boøwy The Best "Story" was released on March 21, 2013. It contains 32 tracks, including the song "Cloudy Heart", which received the most votes in a poll. The documentary and concert film 1224 Film the Movie 2013 opened in theaters nationwide two days later.

Hotei, Takahashi and Matsui recorded the song "Thanks a Lot" for Hotei's 2019 album Guitarhythm VI. This was the first time the three had played together in 31 years.

== Musical style ==
Music writer Takashi Honda wrote that Boøwy established their unique musical style around 1983, after becoming a quartet. Gota Nishidera described them as having absorbed diverse genres such as rock, funk, adult-oriented rock, new wave and punk. He noted that, although they use synthesizers at specific points, their song arrangements were fundamentally conceived with their ability to faithfully reproduce them in live performances as a four-piece band in mind. Tatsuya Sakamoto, a recording engineer who worked on several of their albums, described Himuro as possessing a "rare voice that combines both sweetness and intensity", and expressed marvel at Hotei's "impeccable" musical sensibility and ability to fill-out the band's sound with a single, distortion-free guitar. He opined the latter was possible due to the "sheer density" of the drums and bass, and suspected Takahashi was able to explore various rhythmic possibilities because Matsui refrained from superfluous playing. This description of their rhythm section was echoed by Nishidera, who wrote that while Matsui stood motionless and played a steady 8-beat "like a machine", Takahashi expanded the band's sound palette by utilizing elements such as electronic drums and additional toms, and together they brought the musical ideas of Himuro and Hotei to life. Both Diamond Yukai and Tetsuya Komuro have pointed out that Himuro's singing style possessed characteristics that could be traced back to the "shouting" technique pioneered by Hideki Saijo. According to their record producer, Masahide Sakuma, Boøwy had a strong kayōkyoku-like emotional sentimentality in their songwriting. Hidenori Furuki of Re:minder cited this as the element that set Boøwy apart from other rock bands of the time.

Honda described Boøwy's debut album Moral (1982) and its "cynical" lyrics as conveying a powerful punk attitude, as if the band had "channeled all their anger and frustration directly into the grooves of the record". According to Honda, the lyrics of Instant Love (1983) centered around love songs, while its overall direction aimed to showcase Hotei's innovative guitar work, but its lackluster production failed to capture the raw energy of their live performances. Musician and writer TOMC wrote that the band's 1985 self-titled third album sees Boøwy embrace the new wave genre. Although they had already introduced new wave arrangements on Instant Love, TOMC echoed Honda by opining that the previous album suffered from poor production. Ryutaro Hokari of OK Music wrote that with Just a Hero (1986), Boøwy "successfully distilled" and "seamlessly integrated" the essence of new wave into their own musical identity. He described the lyrics as being depictions of scenes, rather than stories, and suggested they are meant to be felt, rather than thought about. The band themselves described Beat Emotion (1986) as a return to their roots. In a piece for Re:minder, Ikuto Hirose wrote that the album served as the blueprint for the "beat rock" sound that would continue through the Japanese music industry from the 1990s onward.

== Legacy ==
In 1988, the year they broke up, Boøwy became the first male artists to have three number-one albums within a single year on the Oricon chart. They were named Artist of the Year at the 3rd annual Japan Gold Disc Awards in 1989.

The late 1980s "Band Boom" in Japan was credited to Boøwy as they popularized the formation of musical groups, which caused musical instrument sales to hit an all-time high during the 1990s, leading record companies to sign and debut 80 bands during the 1990s in hopes of finding a new Boøwy.

In 2003, HMV Japan ranked Boøwy at number 22 on their list of the "100 Most Important Japanese Pop Acts".

In September 2007, Rolling Stone Japan rated their album Just a Hero at number 75 on its list of the "100 Greatest Japanese Rock Albums of All Time".

Their album Beat Emotion was named number 5 on Bounce's 2009 list of "54 Standard Japanese Rock Albums".

In a 2012 poll by Recochoku, Boøwy were ranked the number one band that people wanted to see reunite.

With the release of Boøwy The Best "Story" in 2013, Boøwy became the second band ever, and first Japanese, to reach number one over 20 years after they broke up. The Beatles being the first.

In 2017, Hotei suggested that with their spiky hair and heavy make-up Boøwy might have been the first visual kei band. Having always been conscious of visuals and influenced by David Bowie, he explained that "I too wanted to create something extraordinary and by wearing make-up, I felt like I had another identity. I thought by adding some fantasy to rock music, it would create more depth in the music."

D'erlanger members Kyo, Cipher and Tetsu all cited Boøwy as one of their favorite bands. Color bassist Marry also listed them as one of his favorites, in addition to naming Moral his favorite album and citing Himuro as his idol. Glay vocalist Teru cited Boøwy as one of his two biggest influences, and named Himuro his favorite singer. Siam Shade bassist Natchin named Boøwy as his favorite band. Mucc guitarist Miya cited Boøwy as a big influence and said Hotei's "percussive" style of guitar playing formed the foundation of his own style. Members of the heavy metal band Head Phones President have also cited Boøwy as an influence.

== Members ==
Classic lineup

- Kyosuke Himuro (氷室京介) – lead vocals (1981–1988)
- Tomoyasu Hotei (布袋寅泰) – guitars, keyboards, backing vocals (1981–1988)
- Tsunematsu Matsui (松井恒松) – bass guitar (1981–1988)
- Makoto Takahashi (高橋まこと) – drums (1981–1988)

Former members

- Mamoru Kimura (木村マモル) – drums (1981)
- Kazuaki Fukasawa (深沢和明) – saxophone, backing vocals (1981–1982)
- Atsushi Moroboshi (諸星アツシ) – guitars (1981–1982)

== Discography ==
=== Studio albums ===
- Moral (March 21, 1982), Oricon Albums Chart Peak Position: No. 2 (1989 re-release)
- Instant Love (September 25, 1983) No. 3 (1988 re-release)
- Boøwy (June 21, 1985) No. 48
- Just a Hero (March 1, 1986) No. 5
- Beat Emotion (November 8, 1986) No. 1
- Psychopath (September 5, 1987) No. 1

=== Singles ===
- "Honky Tonky Crazy" (ホンキー・トンキー・クレイジー, Honkī Tonkī Kureijī; June 1, 1985), Oricon Singles Chart Peak Position: No. 61
- "Bad Feeling" (August 22, 1985) No. 46
- "Wagamama Juliet" (わがままジュリエット, Wagamama Jurietto; February 1, 1986) No. 39
- "B･Blue" (September 29, 1986) No. 7
- "Only You" (April 6, 1987) No. 4
- "Marionette" (Marionette -マリオネット-, Marionetto; July 22, 1987) No. 1
- "Kisetsu ga Kimi Dake wo Kaeru" (季節が君だけを変える; October 26, 1987) No. 4
- "Dakara" (February 3, 1988) No. 2
- "Instant Love" (March 25, 1988) No. 70
- "Oh! My Jully Part I" (March 25, 1988) No. 78
- "My Honey" (April 25, 1988)
- "Funny-Boy" (April 25, 1988)

=== Live albums ===
- "Gigs" Just a Hero Tour 1986 (July 31, 1986) No. 1 (1989 re-release)
- "Last Gigs" (May 3, 1988) No. 1
- "Gigs" Case of Boøwy (November 28, 2001) No. 3
- Gigs at Budokan Beat Emotion Rock'n Roll Circus Tour 1986.11.11~1987.2.24 (February 24, 2004) No. 7
- "Gigs" Case of Boøwy Complete (December 24, 2007) No. 18
- "Last Gigs" Complete (April 5, 2008) No. 10
- "Gigs" Just a Hero Tour 1986 Naked (December 24, 2012) No. 15
- "Gigs" Case of Boøwy -The Original- (August 7, 2017) No. 6
- "Gigs" Case of Boøwy at Kobe (August 7, 2017) No. 44
- "Gigs" Case of Boøwy at Yokohama (August 7, 2017) No. 36
- Last Gigs -The Original- (June 12, 2019) No. 3
- Last Gigs -1988.04.04- (June 12, 2019) No. 33
- Last Gigs -1988.04.05- (June 12, 2019) No. 32
- Memories of 1224 (December 24, 2022) No. 13

=== Compilations ===
- Moral+3 (February 3, 1988, debut album +3 songs from "Dakara" single) No. 1
- Singles (December 24, 1988) No. 1
- Boøwy Complete Limited Edition (December 24, 1991, box set includes all 6 studio albums, "Gigs" Just A Hero Tour 1986, Last Gigs, Singles and a "Specials" disc)
- Boøwy Complete Required Edition (March 3, 1993, re-release of Boøwy Complete Limited Edition) No. 3
- This Boøwy (February 25, 1998) No. 1
- Boøwy Complete 21st Century 20th Anniversary Edition (March 29, 2002, re-release of Boøwy Complete Limited Edition) No. 14
- This Boøwy Dramatic (September 5, 2007) No. 4
- This Boøwy Drastic (September 5, 2007) No. 5
- Boøwy+1 (August 5, 2012, third album + the song "16") No. 118
- Boøwy Single Complete (February 27, 2013, Blu-spec CD box set includes all 7 singles)
- Boøwy The Best "Story" (March 21, 2013) No. 1
- Boøwy 1224 Film the Movie 2013- Original Soundtrack (May 31, 2013)
- Boøwy Special 7inch Box (October 27, 2021, vinyl record box set of all 7 singles)

=== Other albums ===
- Orchestration Boøwy (August 9, 1989, orchestra covers)
- Moral - Trance Mix (January 23, 2002, remix album) No. 13
- Instant Love - Hammer Trance (August 21, 2002, remix album) No. 83
- Boøwy Tribute (December 24, 2003, tribute album)
- Boøwy Respect (December 24, 2003, tribute album)

=== Videos ===
- Boøwy Video (VHS: July 2, 1986, DVD: November 28, 2001, Blu-ray: September 1, 2021), Oricon DVDs Chart Peak Position: No. 5
- "Gigs" Case of Boøwy (4 VHS: October 5, 1987, 2 DVDs: November 28, 2001, Blu-ray: September 1, 2021) No. 2 and No. 3
- Marionette (VHS: October 26, 1987)
- Singles of Boøwy (VHS: December 24, 1991, DVD: November 28, 2001, Blu-ray: September 1, 2021) No. 6
- Last Gigs (DVD: October 27, 2001) No. 1
- 1224 (DVD: December 24, 2001) No. 2
- Gigs at Budokan Beat Emotion Rock'n Roll Circus Tour 1986.11.11~1987.2.24 (DVD: February 24, 2004, Blu-ray: September 1, 2021) No. 2
- "Gigs" Box (DVD: December 24, 2007, 8 disc box-set) No. 12
- "Last Gigs" Complete (DVD: April 5, 2008, Blu-ray: September 1, 2021) No. 3
- Boøwy Blu-ray Complete (6 Blu-ray box set: December 24, 2012), Oricon Blu-rays Chart Peak Position: No. 13
- 1224 Film the Movie 2013 (March 23, 2013, theatrical documentary and live concert)
- 1224 -The Original- (December 24, 2017) DVD: No. 7, Blu-ray: No. 5
