= X Japan discography =

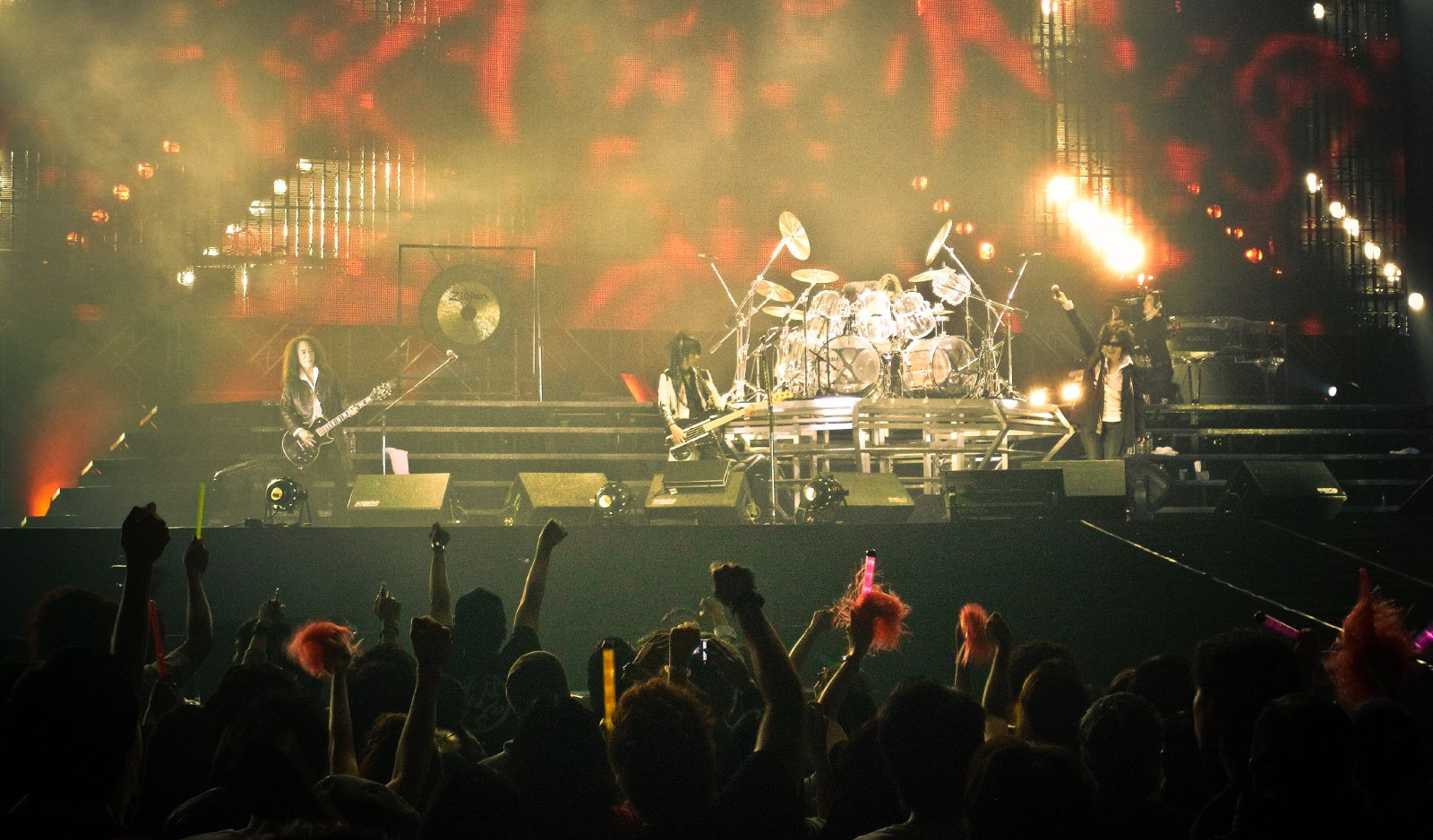
- X Japan in Hong Kong, 2009
- Studio albums: 5
- Soundtrack albums: 1
- Live albums: 6
- Compilation albums: 11
- Singles: 23
- Video albums: 22
- Remix: 1
- Various artists compilations: 3
- Demos: 4

The discography of the Japanese heavy metal band X Japan consists of five studio albums, six live albums, one remix album, eleven compilations, one soundtrack album, 23 singles, and around 22 live video recordings.

Founded in 1982 by vocalist Toshi and drummer Yoshiki, X Japan started out as a power/speed metal band and later gravitated towards a progressive sound with an emphasis on ballads. With the member line-up including bassist Taiji and guitarists hide and Pata since 1987, X released their debut studio album Vanishing Vision on Yoshiki's own record label Extasy Records the following year. They then achieved breakthrough success with their second album and major label debut, Blue Blood, in 1989. It was followed by the million-selling Jealousy (1991), which is the band's most diverse album in terms of songwriting credits. In 1992, the band changed their name to X Japan and bassist Taiji left the group, being replaced by Heath. The mini-album Art of Life was released in 1993, composed solely of the 29-minute title track. Their last album Dahlia was released in 1996, and the following year the band decided to break up. However, after ten years, X Japan reunited in 2007 and recorded the new song "I.V.". They officially recruited lead guitarist Sugizo to fill-in for the deceased hide two years later and in 2011 had their first worldwide release, the digital single "Jade". Shortly after reuniting, work began on their sixth studio album. During its ten years of production, several release dates were announced, but it remains unreleased despite being completed in September 2018.

Besides being one of the first Japanese acts to achieve mainstream success while on an independent label, the band is widely credited as one of the pioneers of visual kei, a movement among Japanese musicians comparable to Western glam. X Japan have sold millions of records in Japan, claiming un-certified sales of over 30 million.

== Albums ==
=== Studio albums ===
Title	Album details	Peak positions	Sales	Certifications
Title	Album details	JPN	Sales	Certifications
Vanishing Vision	Released: April 14, 1988; Label: Extasy; Formats: CD, cassette, LP, digital download	19	JPN: 171,030 or 800,000	—N/a
Blue Blood	Released: April 21, 1989; Label: CBS/Sony; Formats: CD, cassette, LP, digital download	6	JPN: 712,000 or 1,000,000	RIAJ: Platinum
Jealousy	Released: June 1, 1991; Label: Sony; Formats: CD, cassette, LP, digital download	1	JPN: 1,113,000	RIAJ: Million
Art of Life	Released: August 25, 1993; Label: Atlantic; Formats: CD, cassette, digital download	1	JPN: 600,000; KOR: 7,908	RIAJ: Platinum
Dahlia	Released: November 4, 1996; Label: Atlantic; Formats: CD, cassette, LP, digital download	1	JPN: 648,080	RIAJ: Platinum

=== Compilation albums ===
Title	Album details	Peak positions	Sales	Certifications
Title	Album details	JPN	Sales	Certifications
X Singles	Released: November 21, 1993; Label: Ki/oon; Formats: CD, cassette, LP, digital download	2	JPN: 1,000,000	RIAJ: Million
B.O.X ~Best of X~	Released: March 21, 1996; Label: Ki/oon; Formats: CD, cassette, digital download	5	JPN: 134,510	—N/a
Ballad Collection	Released: December 19, 1997; Label: Polydor; Formats: CD, cassette	3	JPN: 566,160	RIAJ: Platinum
X Japan Singles ~Atlantic Years~	Released: December 25, 1997; Label: Atlantic; Format: CD	14	JPN: 102,450	—N/a
Special Box	Released: December 25, 1997; Label: Atlantic; Format: CD	96	JPN: 2,800	—N/a
Single Box	Released: December 25, 1997; Label: Atlantic; Format: CD	—	JPN: 4,650	—N/a
Star Box	Released: January 30, 1999; Label: Sony Music; Formats: CD, cassette	4	JPN: 122,330	—N/a
Perfect Best	Released: February 24, 1999; Label: Atlantic; Format: CD	4	JPN: 256,440	RIAJ: Gold
Best: Fan's Selection	Released: December 19, 2001; Label: Polydor; Formats: CD, cassette	13	JPN: 88,600	—N/a
Complete II	Released: October 1, 2005; Label: Columbia; Format: CD	92	JPN: 3,593	—N/a
The World: X Japan Hatsu no Zensekai Best (The World～X Japan 初の全世界ベスト～)	Released: June 17, 2014; Label: Warner Music Japan; Format: CD	2	JPN: 61,030; KOR: 329	RIAJ: Gold

=== Live albums ===
Title	Album details	Peak positions	Sales	Certifications
Title	Album details	JPN	Sales	Certifications
On the Verge of Destruction 1992.1.7 Tokyo Dome Live	Released: January 1, 1995; Label: Ki/oon; Formats: CD, cassette, digital download	3	JPN: 335,590	RIAJ: Gold
Live Live Live Tokyo Dome 1993-1996	Released: October 15, 1997; Label: Polydor; Format: CD	3	JPN: 283,970	RIAJ: Gold
Live Live Live Extra	Released: November 5, 1997; Label: Warner Music Japan; Format: CD	13	JPN: 32,310	—N/a
Live in Hokkaido 1995.12.4 Bootleg	Released: January 21, 1998; Label: Universal Music; Format: CD	20	JPN: 38,940	—N/a
Art of Life Live	Released: March 18, 1998; Label: Polydor; Formats: CD, digital download	20	JPN: 41,170	—N/a
The Last Live	Released: May 30, 2001; Label: Polydor; Formats: CD, digital download	7	JPN: 92,780	—N/a

=== Remix albums ===
Title	Album details	Peak positions	Sales
Title	Album details	JPN	Sales
Trance X	Released: December 4, 2002; Label: Polydor; Format: CD	27	JPN: 27,195

=== Soundtrack albums ===
Title	Album details	Peak positions			Sales
Title	Album details	JPN	KOR	UK	Sales
We Are X: Original Motion Picture Soundtrack	Released: March 3, 2017; Label: Sony Music; Formats: CD, digital download, LP	3	65	27	JPN: 48,140; KOR: 693

== Singles ==
Title	Year	Peak positions		Sales	Certifications	Album
Title	Year	JPN	JPN Hot	Sales	Certifications	Album
"I'll Kill You"	1985	—	—	JPN: 1,000	—N/a	Non-album singles
"Orgasm" (オルガスム)	1986	—	—	JPN: 1,500	—N/a	Non-album singles
"Kurenai" (紅)	1989	5	20	JPN: 312,580 (phy.); JPN: 350,000 (dig.)	RIAJ: Platinum	Blue Blood
"Endless Rain"	1989	3	—	JPN: 364,450	RIAJ: Platinum	Blue Blood
"Week End"	1990	2	—	JPN: 298,060	RIAJ: Platinum	Blue Blood
"Silent Jealousy"	1991	3	—	JPN: 284,200 (phy.); JPN: 100,000 (dig.)	RIAJ: Gold	Jealousy
"Standing Sex"	1991	4	—	JPN: 261,340	RIAJ: Gold	Non-album single
"Say Anything"	1991	3	—	JPN: 537,790	RIAJ: Platinum	Jealousy
"Tears"	1993	2	—	JPN: 836,940	RIAJ: 2×Platinum	Dahlia
"Rusty Nail"	1994	1	—	JPN: 751,920	RIAJ: Platinum	Dahlia
"Longing ~Togireta Melody~" (Longing ～跡切れたMelody～)	1995	1	—	JPN: 476,170	RIAJ: Platinum	Dahlia
"Longing ~Setsubou no Yoru~" (Longing ～切望の夜～)	1995	5	—	JPN: 171,550	—N/a	Non-album single
"Dahlia"	1996	1	—	JPN: 412,810	RIAJ: Platinum	Dahlia
"Forever Love"	1996	1	—	JPN: 509,920	RIAJ: Platinum	Dahlia
"Crucify My Love"	1996	2	—	JPN: 290,220	RIAJ: Gold	Dahlia
"Scars"	1996	15	—	JPN: 100,350	—N/a	Dahlia
"Forever Love (Last Mix)"	1997	13	—	JPN: 163,050	RIAJ: Gold	Non-album singles
"The Last Song"	1998	8	—	JPN: 91,880	—N/a	Non-album singles
"Forever Love" (re-release)	1998	18	—	JPN: 42,960	—N/a	Dahlia
"Scars" (re-release)	1998	15	—	JPN: 55,440	—N/a	Dahlia
"Forever Love" (re-release)	2001	19	—	JPN: 23,500	—N/a	Dahlia
"I.V."	2008	—	—	—N/a	—N/a	Non-album singles
"Scarlet Love Song -Buddha Mix-"	2011	—	33	—N/a	—N/a	Non-album singles
"Jade"	2011	—	19	—N/a	—N/a	Non-album singles
"Born to Be Free"	2015	—	21	—N/a	—N/a	Non-album singles
"Angel"	2023	—		—N/a	—N/a	Non-album singles

== Various artists compilations ==
Title	Song	Release date	Label
Heavy Metal Force III	"Break the Darkness"	November 7, 1985	Explosion
Skull Thrash Zone Volume I	"Stab Me in the Back", "No Connexion"	March 7, 1987	Victor
Global Metal Soundtrack	"X (Live)"	July 24, 2008	Universal

== VHS / LD / DVD / Blu-ray ==
Title	Details	Peak positions
Title	Details	JPN
Xclamation	Released: August 1987, December 1987; Label: Self-released; Format: VHS	—
Thanx	Released: March 16, 1989; Label: CBS/Sony; Format: VHS	—
Blue Blood Tour Bakuhatsu Sunzen Gig	Released: June 1, 1989 (VHS); June 1, 1989 (LD); September 5, 2001 (DVD); Label: Ki/oon; Formats: VHS, LD, DVD	—
Shigeki! Visual Shock Vol. 2	Released: December 31, 1989 (VHS); December 31, 1989 (LD); September 5, 2001 (DVD); Label: Ki/oon; Formats: VHS, LD, DVD	—
Celebration Visual Shock Vol. 2.5	Released: September 1, 1990 (VHS); September 1, 1990 (LD); September 5, 2001 (DVD); Label: Ki/oon; Formats: VHS, LD, DVD	—
Shigeki 2 ~Yume no Nakadakeni Ikite~ Visual Shock Vol. 3	Released: September 30, 1991 (VHS); September 30, 1991 (LD); September 5, 2001 (DVD); Label: Ki/oon; Formats: VHS, LD, DVD	—
Say Anything ~X Ballad Collection~ Visual Shock Vol. 3.5	Released: December 21, 1991 (VHS); December 21, 1991 (LD); September 5, 2001 (DVD); Label: Ki/oon; Formats: VHS, LD, DVD	—
On the Verge of Destruction 1992.1.7 Tokyo Dome Live Visual Shock Vol. 4	Released: November 1, 1992 (VHS); November 1, 1992 (LD); September 5, 2001 (DVD); Label: Ki/oon; Formats: VHS, LD, DVD	—
X Clips	Released: January 1, 1995 (VHS); January 1, 1995 (LD); July 5, 2000 (DVD); Label: Ki/oon; Formats: VHS, LD, DVD	36
Dahlia the Video Visual Shock #5 Part I	Released: January 1, 1997; Label: Atlantic; Format: VHS	—
Dahlia the Video Visual Shock #5 Part II	Released: March 5, 1997; Label: Atlantic; Format: VHS	—
Dahlia Tour Final 1996	Released: October 29, 1997 (VHS); December 4, 2002 (DVD); September 25, 2013 (Blu-ray); Label: Atlantic; Formats: VHS, DVD, Blu-ray	58
X Japan Clips II	Released: October 24, 2001 (VHS); October 24, 2001 (DVD); Label: Atlantic; Formats: VHS, DVD	12
The Last Live Video	Released: March 29, 2002 (VHS); March 29, 2002 (DVD); Label: Atlantic; Formats: VHS, DVD	7
Dahlia the Video Visual Shock #5 Part I & Part II	Released: December 4, 2002; Label: Atlantic; Format: DVD	82
Art of Life 1993.12.31 Tokyo Dome	Released: September 24, 2003 (VHS); September 24, 2003 (DVD); Label: Atlantic; Formats: VHS, DVD	9
Aoi Yoru	Released: July 25, 2007 (DVD); September 25, 2013 (Blu-ray); Label: Geneon; Formats: DVD, Blu-ray	50
Shiroi Yoru	Released: July 25, 2007 (DVD); September 25, 2013 (Blu-ray); Label: Geneon; Formats: DVD, Blu-ray	49
Aoi Yoru Shiroi Yoru Complete Edition	Released: July 25, 2007; Label: Geneon; Format: DVD	14
X Japan Returns 1993.12.30	Released: February 29, 2008 (DVD); September 25, 2013 (Blu-ray); Label: Geneon; Formats: DVD, Blu-ray	30
X Japan Returns 1993.12.31	Released: February 29, 2008 (DVD); September 25, 2013 (Blu-ray); Label: Geneon; Formats: DVD, Blu-ray	43
X Japan Returns Complete Edition	Released: February 29, 2008; Label: Geneon; Format: DVD	8
X Visual Shock DVD Box 1989-1992	Released: July 23, 2008; Label: Ki/oon; Format: DVD	33
X Japan Showcase in L.A. Premium Prototype	Released: September 6, 2010; Label: Japan Music Agency; Format: DVD	—
The Last Live Complete Edition	Released: October 26, 2011 (DVD); September 25, 2013 (Blu-ray); Label: Geneon; Formats: DVD, Blu-ray	3
X Japan Blu-ray Box	Released: September 25, 2013; Label: Warner Music Japan; Format: Blu-ray	—
X Visual Shock Blu-ray Box: 1989-1992	Released: January 18, 2017; Label: Sony Music Direct (Japan) Inc.; Format: Blu-ray	—

== Demos ==
Title	Release date	Note
"I'll Kill You"	February 1985	Songs: "I'll Kill You", "We Are X" and "Stop Bloody Rain"
"Live"	June 1985	Songs: "Kurenai", "Endless Dream", "Lady in Tears" and "Stop Bloody Rain"
"Endless Dream"	June 1985	Same material as "Live" but different track order.
"Longing ~Togireta Melody~"	December 30/31, 1994; July 25, 2007 (reissue)	Songs: "Longing ~Togireta Melody~" and band rehearsal. Originally distributed on cassette at both the Aoi Yoru and Shiroi Yoru concerts. Released on CD in the Aoi Yoru Shiroi Yoru Complete Edition DVD boxset.

== Unreleased songs ==
- "Feel Me Tonight"

Lyrics by Yoshiki, music by Hally.

- "Install"

Also known as "Feels Damage".

- "Kill the Violence"
- "Kiss the Sky"

Planned to be included on the band's unreleased album.

- "L'arme"

Left-over from the Jealousy album. Part of the song was performed in 2015.

- "Only Way"

Lyrics by Jun and Toshi, music by Jun.

- "Right Now"

Written by Jun.

- "Rockstar"

Planned to be included on the band's unreleased album.

- "Steal Your Heart"
- "Tuneup Baby"

Written by Jun.

- "White Poem II"

Sequel to "White Poem I" from the Dahlia album.

== Other ==
- Gekitotsu!! – Color, February 1988

X provide chorus vocals as guests.

- Tokyo Pop, April 15, 1988

X makes a brief cameo appearance.

- "Kurenai (Original Japanese Version)", May 1988, Rockin' f and Extasy

A flexi disc included in the June 1988 issue of Rockin' f magazine.

- Bosutsu! VOS No. 9 (ボスッ! VOS第9号), November 1988, Takarajima

VHS that came with Takarajima magazine. Live clips of X from September 4, 1988, are shown and Yoshiki is interviewed. Also features Color, Uchoten, Kenji Ohtsuki and several others.

- Symphonic Blue Blood, August 21, 1991

Symphonic album, performed by the Tokyo Academic Chamber Orchestra.

- Muteki to Kaite Extasy to Yomu!! Extasy Summit '91 at Nippon Budokan, February 21, 1992, Extasy

Live recordings of the October 29, 1991, Extasy Summit, held by Extasy Records. Also features Tokyo Yankees, Virus, Luna Sea and several others.

- Symphonic Silent Jealousy, August 26, 1992

Symphonic album, performed by the Tokyo Academic Chamber Orchestra.

- Orchestra Selection - Blue Blood & Jealousy, November 21, 1992

Symphonic album, performed by the Royal Philharmonic Orchestra.

- Minna Mumei-Datta, Dakedo... Muteki-Datta Extasy Summit 1992, May 10, 1993, Extasy

Live recordings of the October 31, 1992, Extasy Summit, held by Extasy Records. X does not perform together, but the members do perform with other acts. Also features Luna Sea, Deep, Media Youth, The Zolge, Tokyo Yankees, Screaming Mad George and Psychosis, Gilles de Rais, Zi:Kill and several others.

- X Japan Virtual Shock 001, October 20, 1995, Sega

Video game for the Sega Saturn home console. The player takes the role of a fan disguised as a photographer backstage at X Japan's December 31, 1994, concert at the Tokyo Dome (Shiroi Yoru). After collecting several items to gain access and photograph the band members, the player edits a live video of "Rusty Nail" and the game ends with footage from the concert.

- X Japan on Piano, May 25, 1998

Symphonic album, performed by an ensemble of several recognized classical musicians.

- Rose & Blood -Indies of X-, May 2, 2001

Unofficial compilation album featuring demos from the Jealousy album sessions. The band is credited as "iX".

- Global Metal, June 20, 2008

Various live clips of X are shown and Yoshiki is interviewed.

- We Are X, January 23, 2016

Documentary about X Japan and Yoshiki.

- Extasy Visual Shock, March 31, 2022

Visual kei-themed rhythm game for iOS and Android. Featured X Japan songs and video footage. Also featured Luna Sea and Glay. Service ended on October 31, 2022, after only seven months.
