= Best: Fan's Selection =

Compilation album by X Japan
- Released: December 19, 2001
- Genres: Heavy metal; speed metal; power metal; symphonic power metal; progressive metal
- Length: 1:48:00
- Label: Polydor

X Japan chronology
Perfect Best (1999)	Best: Fan's Selection (2001)	Complete II (2005)

Best: Fan's Selection is a compilation album by Japanese heavy metal band X Japan, released on December 19, 2001. It contains songs selected by fans at an online poll and listed in order of voting rank. The album reached number 13 on the Oricon chart.

Although there is no description in particular, all tracks on this album were remastered for this album by Bill Dooley, who also engineered Judas Priest's album Turbo.

== Track listing ==
Disc One
No.	Title	Length
1.	"Kurenai"	06:19
2.	"Silent Jealousy"	07:19
3.	"Endless Rain"	06:37
4.	"Rusty Nail"	05:29
5.	"Tears"	10:32
6.	"Art of Life"	28:59
Total length:		01:05:15

Disc Two
No.	Title	Length
1.	"Dahlia"	08:01
2.	"Say Anything"	08:42
3.	"Forever Love (Single Version)"	08:39
4.	"Longing: Togireta Melody"	07:41
5.	"Scars"	05:10
6.	"Crucify My Love"	04:32
Total length:		42:45
