= We Are X (soundtrack) =

Soundtrack album by X Japan
- Released: March 3, 2017
- Genre: Heavy metal, symphonic metal
- Length: 78:41
- Label: Sony Music's Legacy Recordings

We Are X is the 2017 soundtrack album to the documentary film We Are X, containing a compilation of songs by Japanese heavy metal band X Japan. It was released on March 3, 2017 by Sony Music's Legacy Recordings. In the first week of the release of the album it reached No. 4 in Japan's Oricon Albums Chart. It also reached No. 1 in the UK Rock & Metal Albums Chart, No. 3 in the UK Soundtrack Albums Chart and No. 27 in the main UK Albums Chart, making it their first appearance on the UK chart.

== Overview ==
Tracks 1 and 14 are new songs exclusive to this soundtrack album. The Japan-exclusive Blu-spec CD version of the soundtrack includes two additional songs.

"La Venus" was written for the documentary film. Yoshiki already had the idea for it, but when director Stephen Kijak asked him to write the film's ending theme, he started structuring "La Venus" and finished the lyrics. The version included on the film's soundtrack is an acoustic one, but Yoshiki described the version set to be included on X Japan's unreleased album as "very heavy." On December 13, 2016, it was announced that "La Venus" was one of 91 songs in contention for nomination for the Academy Award for Best Original Song for the 89th Academy Awards.

On March 3, 2017, an album signing took place at HMV in Oxford Street, London. Over 1,000 people attended the signing resulting in the street having to be closed for the duration of the event. All the copies of the physical copies of the album available at the signing were sold in the event. According to store staff, this was the first time there was a sell-out of all physical copies at such a signing.

== Reception ==
Japako Music gave We Are X a rating of 4 out 5 stars, saying that: "Overall, this soundtrack has a very distinctive sound that anyone who loves rock or heavy metal music will love and enjoy. For anyone who is interested in Japanese music and trends in music, this is an important soundtrack and one that, having reached 4th on Oricon Albums Chart and 1st on the UK Rock & Metal Albums Chart, will have a long-lasting effect on Japanese rock and metal."

== Track listing ==
| No. | Title | Lyrics | Music | Length |
|---|---|---|---|---|
| 1. | "La Venus" (acoustic version) | Yoshiki | Yoshiki | 4:40 |
| 2. | "Kurenai" (from The Last Live) | Yoshiki | Yoshiki | 5:38 |
| 3. | "Forever Love" | Yoshiki | Yoshiki | 8:38 |
| 4. | "A Piano String in Es Dur" | | Yoshiki | 1:51 |
| 5. | "Dahlia" | Yoshiki | Yoshiki | 7:58 |
| 6. | "Crucify My Love" | Yoshiki | Yoshiki | 4:32 |
| 7. | "Xclamation" | | hide and Taiji | 3:54 |
| 8. | "Standing Sex" (from X Japan Returns) | Miyuki Igarashi | Yoshiki | 4:45 |
| 9. | "Tears" | Hitomi Shiratori and Yoshiki | Yoshiki | 7:12 |
| 10. | "Longing / Setsubo-no-yoru" | | Yoshiki | 5:12 |
| 11. | "Art of Life (3rd Movement)" | Yoshiki | Yoshiki | 4:39 |
| 12. | "Endless Rain" (from The Last Live) | Yoshiki | Yoshiki | 7:06 |
| 13. | "X" (from The Last Live) | Hitomi Shiratori | Yoshiki | 6:35 |
| 14. | "Without You" (Unplugged) | Yoshiki | Yoshiki | 6:01 |

Japanese edition bonus CD
| No. | Title | Lyrics | Music | Length |
|---|---|---|---|---|
| 1. | "Rusty Nail" (from Dahlia Tour Final ~Mubou na Yoru~) | Yoshiki | Yoshiki | 5:40 |
| 2. | "Forever Love" (from The Last Live) | | | 8:03 |

"Rusty Nail" is also the last song on the Japanese 2LP release, after "Without You."

== Charts ==
| Chart (2017) | Peak position |
|---|---|
| Japanese Albums (Oricon) | 4 |
| South Korean Albums (Circle) | 99 |
| South Korean International Albums (Circle) | 11 |
| UK Albums (OCC) | 27 |
| UK Rock & Metal Albums (OCC) | 1 |
| UK Soundtrack Albums (OCC) | 3 |
