= The World: X Japan Hatsu no Zensekai Best =

X Japan Hatsu no Zensekai Best

Compilation album by X Japan
- Released: June 17, 2014
- Genre: Heavy metal
- Length: 1:47:16
- Label: Warner Music Japan

X Japan compilation chronology
| Complete II (2005) | X Japan Hatsu no Zensekai Best (2014) |

The World: X Japan Hatsu no Zensekai Best (THE WORLD～X JAPAN 初の全世界ベスト～) is a compilation album by X Japan, released June 17, 2014. Prior to its physical release, a digital version titled X Japan World Best became available in 111 countries via iTunes on May 21. It contains the band's hit songs from their major label career, as well as a live performance of the hide tribute song Without You for the first time. The Japanese version includes Amethyst from The Last Live. The album reached number 2 on the Oricon main chart, and was certified gold by RIAJ in 2016.

== Track listing ==
Disc 1
| No. | Title | Length |
|---|---|---|
| 1. | "Silent Jealousy" | 07:20 |
| 2. | "Rusty Nail" | 05:29 |
| 3. | "Scars" | 05:09 |
| 4. | "Endless Rain" | 06:36 |
| 5. | "Week End" | 05:45 |
| 6. | "Kurenai (紅)" | 06:20 |
| 7. | "Forever Love" | 08:38 |
| 8. | "Dahlia" | 07:57 |
| 9. | "Amethyst (The Last Live Version)" (only on the Japanese version) | 06:21 |
| 10. | "X (The Last Live Version)" | 10:08 |
| 11. | "Without You (Live Version)" | 08:33 |
| Total length: | | 01:18:16 |

Disc 2
| No. | Title | Length |
|---|---|---|
| 1. | "Art of Life" | 29:00 |

DVD
| No. | Title | Length |
|---|---|---|
| 1. | "Exclusive Trailer of X JAPAN World Tour Live 2009, 2010 & 2011" |
