= Live in Hokkaido 1995.12.4 Bootleg =

Live album by X Japan

Live album by X Japan
- Released: January 21, 1998
- Recorded: Tsukisamu Green Dome, December 4, 1995
- Genre: Heavy metal, speed metal, power metal
- Length: 1:13:53
- Label: Universal Music

X Japan live chronology
Live Live Live Extra (1997)	Live in Hokkaido; 1995.12.4 Bootleg (1998)	Art of Life Live (1998)

Live in Hokkaido 1995.12.4 Bootleg is an X Japan live album released on January 21, 1998. It contains a shortened recording of the band's performances at the Tsukisamu Green Dome on December 4, 1995. The "bootleg" moniker applies as the album's sound quality is not on par with X Japan's other live recordings. The album reached number 20 on the Oricon chart.

== Track listing ==
No.	Title	Lyrics	Music	Length
1.	"Amethyst"	-	Yoshiki	6:16
2.	"Rusty Nail"	Yoshiki	Yoshiki	5:41
3.	"Sadistic Desire"	Yoshiki	hide	5:43
4.	"Scars"	hide	hide	7:20
5.	"Dahlia"	Yoshiki	Yoshiki	8:10
6.	"Week End"	Yoshiki	Yoshiki	6:03
7.	"Endless Rain"	Yoshiki	Yoshiki	5:37
8.	"Kurenai"	Yoshiki	Yoshiki	7:13
9.	"Longing"	Yoshiki	Yoshiki	7:58
10.	"Drum Break"	-	-	1:36
11.	"Unfinished"	Yoshiki	Yoshiki	3:16
12.	"X"	Hitomi Shiratori	Yoshiki	8:46
