= Dahlia (album) =

1996 studio album by X Japan

Studio album by X Japan
- Released: November 4, 1996
- Recorded: July 1993 – July 1996
- Studio: One on One (Los Angeles)
- Genres: Heavy metal; symphonic metal; industrial rock
- Length: 57:37
- Languages: English, Japanese
- Label: Atlantic
- Producer: Yoshiki

X Japan chronology
Art of Life (1993)	Dahlia (1996)	Untitled (TBA)

Singles from Dahlia
- 1. "Tears" Released: November 10, 1993; 2. "Rusty Nail" Released: July 10, 1994; 3. "Longing ~Togireta Melody~" Released: August 1, 1995; 4. "Dahlia" Released: February 26, 1996; 5. "Forever Love" Released: July 8, 1996; 6. "Crucify My Love" Released: August 26, 1996; 7. "Scars" Released: November 18, 1996

Dahlia is the fifth studio album by Japanese rock band X Japan, released on November 4, 1996, by Atlantic Records. It is the band's last album before breaking up the following year, and the last to feature new work by guitarist hide, due to his death two years later. The album is composed largely of ballads, with only a few tracks retaining the band's heavier musical traits seen on previous releases. It topped the Oricon chart and stayed on the chart for only 15 weeks, but managed to sell over half a million copies. Seven, nearly all, of the album's songs were released as singles, most of which also topped the singles chart and sold well.

== Overview ==
Only a few months after the release of Art of Life in 1993, X Japan began recording and releasing singles that would appear on their next studio album Dahlia, which released in 1996 turned out to be their last. 1994 held few performances for the band as the members were focusing on their solo and side projects, but they did play two consecutive New Year's Eve concerts at the Tokyo Dome, titled Aoi Yoru (青い夜; Blue Night) and Shiroi Yoru (白い夜; White Night) respectively. These concerts were released on DVDs in 2007 as Aoi Yoru and Shiroi Yoru. The following year was also slow, until November 19 when the band began the tour for their next album, Dahlia Tour 1995–1996. Around this time the group dropped most of its original visual kei aesthetics in favor of a more casual look.

Dahlia was recorded from July 1993 to July 1996 entirely at One on One Recording Studios (later named Extasy Recording Studios) in North Hollywood, California, which Yoshiki bought in 1992. The cover of the album was taken on the street of Broadway in New York City. The Dahlia Tour continued from 1995 into 1996 with quite a few dates cancelled after the March 13 show, because of Yoshiki's neck injury. They returned to the stage for the tour's final concerts Resurrection Night (復活の夜) and Reckless Night (無謀な夜), once again two New Year's concerts at the Tokyo Dome. The latter was recorded and partially released as the Live Live Live Extra album, and later in its entirety as the Dahlia Tour Final 1996 DVD.

Besides a handful of releases, the beginning of 1997 was quiet for the band, with no concerts performed. Until September 22, 1997, when it was officially announced that X Japan would disband as vocalist Toshi decided to leave the group. X Japan performed their farewell concert, The Last Live: Last Night, at the Tokyo Dome on December 31, making it the last of five consecutive New Year's Eve series the group performed at that stadium. It was later released as a live album and on home video. Although later that same day they played "Forever Love" at that year's Kōhaku Uta Gassen, marking their true last performance.

=== Composition ===
Dahlia contains relatively little new material considering most tracks on it had been released as singles. The album is composed largely of ballads, with only a few tracks (i.e. "Scars", "Dahlia", "Drain", and to some extent "Rusty Nail") retaining the band's heavier musical traits seen on previous releases. The track "Dahlia" is one of Yoshiki's last compositions in his signature blend of speed and symphonic metal. The ballad "Tears" was written and composed by Yoshiki about the death of his father, though credited as co-authored by one of his aliases Hitomi Shiratori. The two songs written by hide, "Scars" and "Drain", are distinctively industrial rock. Yoshiki called "Drain" "very strange" and "very cutting edge" for its time, and said that hide had a talent for seeing the future in that regard. According to hide's Spread Beaver bandmate I.N.A., "Drain" reuses a basic track that was programmed by Heath. The instrumental "Wriggle" is Heath's only official contribution to the band's catalogue, which he co-wrote with Pata. The bassist initially wrote the song, before Pata added guitar and did a little bit of the arrangement.

=== Release ===
The album was released on November 4, 1996, by Atlantic Records. In the third counting week of November, it reached number one on the Oricon chart, with sales of 429,280 copies and was certified platinum. By the end of the counting year, which ends around the third week of November, it had sold 500,710 copies and was the 50th best-selling album of the year. It charted for 15 weeks, the shortest of all the band's major studio albums. In addition to the standard CD, a limited pressing of picture disc vinyl LPs was also created.

All of the singles, besides "Scars" and "Crucify My Love", the latter being certified Gold (meaning at least 200,000 copies sold) by the RIAJ, were certified platinum or double platinum (meaning at least 400,000 or 800,000 copies, respectively, sold). Prior to the album's release, their best-selling single "Tears" was released in 1993. It reached number two in the fourth counting week of November, with sales of 284,350 copies. By the end of the counting year, with sales of 380,150, it was the 77th best-selling single of the year. As it charted for 16 weeks in 1994, with 456,790 copies, it was the 50th best-selling single.

In 1994 their second best-selling single was released, "Rusty Nail". It reached number one in the third and fourth counting weeks of July, with sales of 204,290 and 130,730 copies, respectively. It charted for 20 weeks. In 1994, with sales of 712,390 copies, it was the 28th best-selling single of the year.

In 1995, two singles with different variations of the same song, "Longing", were released. The first "Longing ~Togireta Melody~", which was included in the album, reached number one in the second counting week of August, with sales of 244,460 copies, and charted for 11 weeks. By the end of the counting year, with 476,170 copies sold, it was the 76th best-selling single. The second "Longing ~Setsubou no Yoru~", reached number five in the fourth counting week of December, with sales of 85,900 copies, and charted for 7 weeks.

In 1996, three singles were released prior to the album, "Dahlia", "Forever Love" and "Crucify My Love". The fourth single "Dahlia" reached number one in the second week of March, with sales of 256,330 copies, and charted for 8 weeks. By the end of the counting year, with 412,810 copies sold, it was the 72nd best-selling single.

The fifth single, "Forever Love", has been reissued several times. The original edition reached number one in the fourth counting week of July, with sales of 224,010 copies. As it charted for 15 weeks, with 509,920 copies sold, it was the 47th best-selling single of the year. A different mixed version released in 1997 reached number thirteen, and charted for 11 weeks. The 1998 release, which was a reissue of the original, and the 2001 one, which contained all previous versions, reached numbers eighteen and nineteen, respectively, and both charted for 4 weeks.

The sixth single, "Crucify My Love", reached number two in the second counting week of September, with sales of 153,570 copies. In the upcoming three weeks it would manage to stay in the top 15, but with sales of 246,800 copies in four weeks and as it charted for only 9 weeks, it wasn't even in the top 100 yearly singles.

The seventh single, "Scars", was the only one released after the album and is the band's only single to be written by someone other than Yoshiki, as it was written by the band's lead guitarist hide. It reached number fifteen in the first week of December 1996, with sales of 47,010 copies, and charted for 5 weeks. Following hide's death, it was reissued in 1998.

== Reception ==
Professional ratings
Review scores
Source	Rating
Allmusic	3.5/5 stars
RockGarage	10/10

Dahlia is generally positively received. Alexey Eremenko of Allmusic wrote that despite being a heavy metal act at their core, X Japan was "always a deceptively diverse band" and Dahlia shows this trait in spades; "what should have been a recipe for disaster turned out to be a testament to the band's songwriting skills and simply a formidable album." He called the opening two tracks "classic metal ballbreakers" and noted that "Scars" and "Drain" sound more like Hide's subsequent experiments with industrial rock than proper speed metal. In addition to finding an ample amount of piano-and-string ballads, Eremenko wrote the album also has a "U2-like speedy ditty", semi-psychedelic experiments such as the catchy "White Poem I", a ten-minute epic that "puts 'November Rain' to shame with its turgid bombast", and embraces all "the genuine traits of '80s rock without discrimination, be it melodrama, classic heavy metal shredding, left-field guitar excursions, neo-classical leanings, or more melodrama." Giving the album a three and a half out of five stars rating, he concluded his review by stating that although Dahlia is "kitschy and sappy", it is also "proof that X Japan split because they were bursting with creativity, not running out of ideas."

Music journalist Showgun Fuyu described "Dahlia", with its fast tempo, fugue-like layering of classical elements, and noisy guitars, as fusing melodic speed metal with alternative rock. He suggested that it, and the industrial rock of Hide's compositions "Scars" and "Drain", are X Japan's response to the sentiment of the time that "metal is outdated".

== Legacy ==
Several songs from the record remain mainstays in X Japan's live sets even after reuniting in 2007, such as "Rusty Nail," "Tears," "Forever Love" and "Drain."

"Rusty Nail" was used as the theme song for the 1994 TV drama Kimi ga Mienai. Swedish metal band Dragonland added a cover of the song to the Japanese edition of their 2004 album Starfall. hide's latter band Zilch reworked "Drain" into "What's Up Mr. Jones?" for their 1998 album 3.2.1..

"Forever Love" was the theme song of 1996 animated feature film of the Clamp manga X. In 2001, "Forever Love" was used as background music in several commercials for the Japanese Liberal Democratic Party. LDP member Junichiro Koizumi, at that time Japan's Prime Minister, is a well-known X Japan fan. A remix of "White Poem I" was used as the B-side of the "Scars" single, while "Scars" was used as one of the many opening themes to the music television show Count Down TV.

"Tears" was used in the soundtrack for the 2004 South Korean film Windstruck. The song was covered by South Korean rock band TRAX in 2004, as a B-side on the Japanese version of their "Scorpio" single, which was produced by Yoshiki. They also covered it in Korean on the Korean version of the aforementioned single. "Crucify My Love" was covered by Spanish gothic metal band Gothic Dolls on their 2008 album The Last Breath.

Dahlia was the inspiration for the first name of the antagonist Dahlia Hawthorne in the English version of the 2004 video game Phoenix Wright: Ace Attorney – Trials and Tribulations.

== Track listing ==
All tracks are written by Yoshiki, except where noted.

No.	Title	Lyrics	Music	Length
1.	"Dahlia"			7:55
2.	"Scars"	Hide	Hide	5:08
3.	"Longing ~Togireta Melody~" (Longing ～跡切れた Melody～)			7:42
4.	"Rusty Nail"			5:27
5.	"White Poem I"			3:16
6.	"Crucify My Love"			4:30
7.	"Tears"	Hitomi Shiratori, Yoshiki		10:30
8.	"Wriggle"	instrumental	Heath, Pata	1:24
9.	"Drain"	Hide, Toshi	Hide	3:22
10.	"Forever Love (Acoustic Version)"			7:54

== Personnel ==
X Japan

- Vocals: Toshi
- Guitar: hide
- Guitar: Pata
- Bass: Heath
- Drums, piano: Yoshiki

Additional musicians

- Violin, soloist: Gilles Apap
- Cello, soloist: Ron Leonard
- Orchestra arrangements: Dick Marx, Shelly Berg
- Score: Tom Halm

Production

- Co-producer: X Japan
- Engineer: Rich Breen, Mike Ging, Rob Jacobs, Motonari Matsumoto, Shinichi Tanaka
- Assistant engineer: C.J. DeVillar, Paul J. Falcone, Brad Haehnel, Cappy Japngie, Richard Landers, Tal Miller, Carl Nappa, Mike Stock
- Engineer, mixing: Stan Katayama
- Mixing: Mike Shipley, Yuji Sugiyama, Eric Westfall
- Programming: Geoff Grace
- Mastering: Chris Bellman, Stephen Marcussen
- Photographer: Hideo Canno
