= The Last Song (X Japan song) =

Single by X Japan
- Released: March 18, 1998
- Genre: Symphonic rock
- Length: 11:26
- Label: Polydor
- Songwriter: Yoshiki

X Japan singles chronology
"Forever Love (Last Mix)" (1997)	"The Last Song" (1998)	"I.V." (2008)

"The Last Song" is an X Japan single released on March 18, 1998, shortly after the band's breakup in late 1997.

== Summary ==
It comes on an enhanced CD containing one audio track, along with several bonus features on the data track, such as the band's disbandment statement, a full discography and a live video of "The Last Song", filmed during the band's last concert on December 31, 1997, at the Tokyo Dome. The single's cover art depicts X Japan co-founders Yoshiki and Toshi embracing during the aforementioned concert, which was also released as a live album (The Last Live) and a home video (The Last Live Video), however, the footage of this song was cut from the video. It was later restored when the home video was re-released in 2011 as The Last Live Complete Edition.

As its name states, this song was the last song released by X Japan, until 2008 when they released "I.V.", the theme song for Saw IV, and the last song to feature new work from their longtime guitarist Hide before his death.

The "Last Live" performance was the first and last time the song was played live by this lineup of the band, it was however the first song the band performed live after reuniting, as it was the opening song at their first reunion concert on March 28, 2008, also at the Tokyo Dome. The 1997 performance ended with the band laying down their instruments one by one, in a manner similar to Joseph Haydn's Farewell Symphony, until only Yoshiki was left playing the piano.

The single reached number 8 on the Oricon charts, and charted for 9 weeks.

== Track listing ==
Written and composed by Yoshiki.

1. "The Last Song" – 11:26
