= The Last Live =

The Last Live may refer to:

- The Last Live (X Japan album)
- The Last Live (Princess Princess album)

== See also ==
- The Last Live Video, a live DVD/VHS by X Japan
