= Star Box =

Star Box may refer to:

== Film and TV ==
- Star Box (talk show), Philippines

== Music ==
- Star Box, Japanese compilation series including:
  - Star Box (X Japan album)
  - Star Box, compilation album by Barbee Boys
  - Star Box, compilation album by Kome Kome Club
  - Star Box, compilation album by Princess Princess (band)
  - and many more
