= Red Swan (song) =

- Standard edition cover

Single by Yoshiki featuring Hyde
- Language: English; Japanese
- Released: October 3, 2018
- Recorded: 2018
- Studio: Yoshiki (Los Angeles); EastWest (Los Angeles); Tanta (Tokyo, Japan)
- Genre: Rock
- Length: 4:23
- Label: Pony Canyon
- Songwriter: Yoshiki
- Producer: Yoshiki

Yoshiki singles chronology
"Golden Globe Theme" (2013)	"Red Swan" (2018)

Alternative cover
- Attack on Titan and digital editions cover, featuring Eren Yeager (foreground) and Levi Ackerman (background)

Music video
- "Red Swan" (Attack on Titan anime theme) – Official Lyric Video on YouTube

"Red Swan" is a song by Japanese musician Yoshiki, featuring vocals by Hyde. Written and produced by Yoshiki, it is the opening theme song of the first 12 episodes of the third season of the Attack on Titan anime series. The television edit of the song was published on digital platforms on July 23, 2018, while the full single version was released on October 3, 2018.

The single debuted at No. 4 on the Oricon Singles Chart and number 5 on Billboard Japan's Hot 100. It also topped the iTunes Rock Chart in 10 countries, making it the best-performing anime song in the chart's history, and reached the top ten on the iTunes mainstream charts in 16 countries. In 2019, the song won Top Japanese Gold Song at the 30th International Pop Poll Awards.

== Background and release ==
On July 8, 2018, it was revealed at Anime Expo in Los Angeles that X Japan had teamed up with Hyde from L'Arc-en-Ciel to create the theme song of the third season of the Attack on Titan anime. "Red Swan" was originally announced as an X Japan song, that would only feature Yoshiki and Sugizo, with Hyde on vocals. However, later that month the song was announced to now be credited to "Yoshiki feat. Hyde".

"Red Swan" was inspired by a section of X Japan's 1994 number-one single "Rusty Nail". Its standard edition cover art was designed with elements from the cover art of "Rusty Nail", namely the blood dripping from a woman's mouth. On September 15, Yoshiki revealed that "Red Swan" was actually completed just days earlier in Los Angeles. Two days later, Yoshiki and Hyde performed the song live on Music Station.

The television edit of the song was published on digital platforms on July 23, 2018, while the full song was released digitally and on CD, in two different versions, on October 3, 2018.

== Reception ==
Michelle Minikhiem of J-Generation called "Red Swan" "grand in the way only songs written by Yoshiki can be," with a vocal performance that "absolutely aches with longing." She described the track and its "swelling percussion, passionately romantic lyrics, and murmured philosophical questioning about life" as telling the story of a bittersweet love.

In 2019, the song won Top Japanese Gold Song at the 30th International Pop Poll Awards in Hong Kong.

== Chart performance ==
"Red Swan" debuted at No. 4 on the Oricon Singles Chart and charted for 19 weeks. It also debuted at No. 3 on the Oricon Digital Singles Chart.

The song debuted at number 5 on Billboard Japan's Hot 100. It also reached number 6 on Billboard Japan's Top Singles chart, which is based only on physical sales, and topped Billboard Japan's Hot Animation chart, which tracks anime and video game music.

The single topped the iTunes Rock charts in Japan, Finland, Greece, Chile, Argentina, Colombia, Mexico, Peru, Brazil and Hong Kong, making it the best-performing anime song in the chart's history. It also reached No. 6 on the US Rock chart and No. 8 on the UK Rock chart. The song reached the top ten on the iTunes mainstream charts in 16 countries.

== Track listing ==
All tracks are written by Yoshiki.

Standard and digital editions
No.	Title	Length
1.	"Red Swan" (featuring Hyde)	4:23
2.	"Red Swan" (instrumental)	4:20
Total length:		8:43

Attack on Titan edition
No.	Title	Length
1.	"Red Swan" (featuring Hyde)	4:23
2.	"Red Swan" (instrumental)	4:20
3.	"Red Swan" (featuring Hyde / TV edit)	1:30
Total length:		10:13

TV edit
No.	Title	Length
1.	"Red Swan" (featuring Hyde / TV edit)	1:30
Total length:		1:30

== Personnel ==
- Yoshiki – drums, piano, guitar, bass, synthesizers, production, orchestration
- Hyde – vocals

Special guest appearances

- Sugizo – guitar
- Pata – guitar
- Heath – bass

Production

- Mark Needham – mixing engineer
- Stephen Marcussen – mastering engineer
- Shelly Berg – orchestration
- Daniel Sternbaum – recording engineer
- Ryan Boesch – recording engineer
- Yuji Sugiyama – recording engineer
- Toshi Minesaki – recording engineer
- Hisayuki Watanabe – recording engineer
- Steve Churchyard – orchestra recording
- Brian Fedirko – programming

All tracks recorded and mixed at Yoshiki Studio (Los Angeles), EastWest Studios (Los Angeles), Studio Tanta (Tokyo, Japan)

== Charts ==
Weekly chart performance for "Red Swan"
Chart (2018)	Peak position
Japan (Oricon)	4
Japan Hot 100 (Billboard Japan)	5

== Sales ==
Region	Certification	Certified units/sales
Japan	—	27,954
