= X Visual Shock DVD Box 1989–1992 =

X Visual Shock DVD Box

Video by X Japan
- Released: July 23, 2008
- Genre: Heavy metal, speed metal
- Label: Ki/oon

X Japan chronology
X Japan Returns Complete Edition (2008)	X Visual Shock DVD Box (2008)	X Japan Showcase in L.A. Premium Prototype (2010)

X Visual Shock DVD Box is an X Japan box set released on July 23, 2008. It collects every home videos X Japan released before changing their name from X, along with one DVD containing previously unreleased material from the band's earlier career.

== Track Listing (DVDs) ==
- Blue Blood Tour Bakuhatsu Sunzen Gig
- Shigeki! Visual Shock Vol. 2
- Celebration Visual Shock Vol. 2.5
- Shigeki 2 ~Yume no Nakadakeni Ikite~ Visual Shock Vol. 3
- Say Anything ~X Ballad Collection~ Visual Shock Vol. 3.5
- On the Verge of Destruction 1992.1.7 Tokyo Dome Live Visual Shock Vol. 4 (2 discs)
- X Clips
- X Film Gig: Chi to Bara ni Mamirete (previously unreleased)
1. "Prologue ~ World Anthem"
2. "Blue Blood"
3. "Sadistic Desire"
4. "Week End"
5. "Stab Me in the Back"
6. "Pata Solo"
7. "Taiji Solo"
8. "Celebration"
9. "hide Solo"
10. "Drum Solo"
11. "Piano Solo"
12. "Unfinished"
13. "Kurenai"
14. "Orgasm"
15. "20th Century Boy"
16. "X"
17. "Endless Rain"
