= Heath (musician) =

Japanese musician (1968–2023)

Heath 森江 博
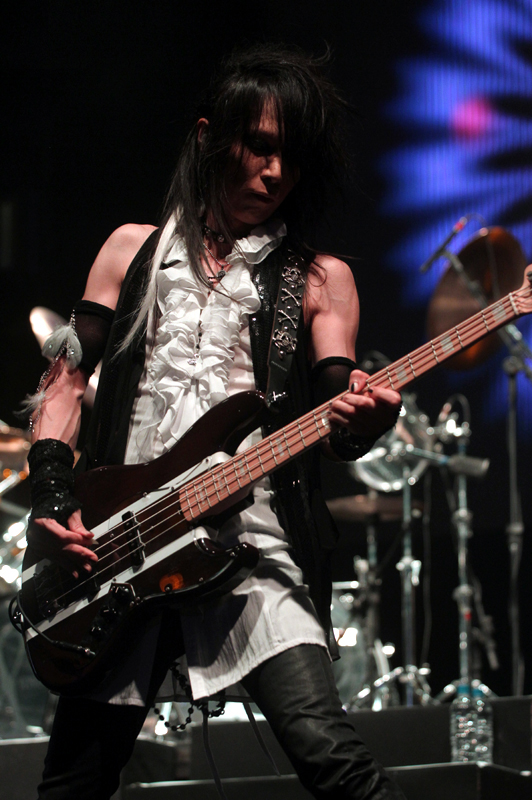
- Heath performing with X Japan in São Paulo, Brazil 2011

Background information
- Born: Hiroshi Morie; January 22, 1968; Amagasaki, Hyogo, Japan
- Died: October 29, 2023 (aged 55)
- Genres: Rock; heavy metal
- Occupations: Musician; singer-songwriter; record producer
- Instruments: Bass guitar; vocals
- Years active: 1986–2023
- Labels: Primitive; Polydor
- Formerly of: X Japan
- Website: www.heathproject.com

Japanese name
- Kanji: 森江 博
- Hiragana: もりえ ひろし
Transcriptions
- Romanization: Morie Hiroshi

Hiroshi Morie (Japanese: 森江 博, Hepburn: Morie Hiroshi; January 22, 1968 – October 29, 2023), known exclusively by his stage name Heath, (Note: His stage name is written in all capital English alphabet letters while in regard to his work with X Japan and Dope HEADz, but in all lowercase letters when talking of his solo career.) was a Japanese musician and singer-songwriter. He was best known as bass guitarist of the rock band X Japan from 1992 to 1997, and again from 2007 until his death in 2023. In 2018, readers and professional musicians voted Heath the seventh best bassist in the history of hard rock and heavy metal in We Rock magazine's "Metal General Election".

After performing in bands such as Paranoia and Media Youth, Heath joined X Japan in August 1992, replacing Taiji who had left earlier in the year. They released two number one studio albums, Art of Life (1993) and Dahlia (1996), before disbanding in 1997. Heath then focused on his solo career, which he started in 1995, before forming Dope HEADz with X Japan guitarist Pata and former Spread Beaver programmer I.N.A. in 2000. The group ceased activity after its second album in 2002, and Heath resumed his solo career three years later. He reunited with X Japan in 2007 and continued to perform and record with them sporadically for the next 16 years, until his death from colon cancer in October 2023.

== Early life and influences ==
Hiroshi Morie was born on January 22, 1968, in Amagasaki, Hyogo, Japan. His family's home had many musical instruments, and he said they were keen on karaoke long before it became popular. Because his brother, who was four years older, played guitar, Heath picked up the bass. However, he could also play the guitar and drums. In fourth grade, his mother took him and his brother to see Van Halen, and this sparked Heath's interest in rock music. He was influenced by Western acts such as Van Halen, Mötley Crüe, Deep Purple, Rainbow and Kiss, as well as domestic acts such as 44Magnum and Dead End. Heath started playing in bands himself during junior high school. When one of these groups decided each member should have a stage name, Hiroshi chose Heath, which was derived from his nickname "Hi-chan" (ひーちゃん). He always knew he wanted to be a professional musician, and never thought of having a traditional job.

== Career ==
=== 1986–1997: Early bands and X Japan ===
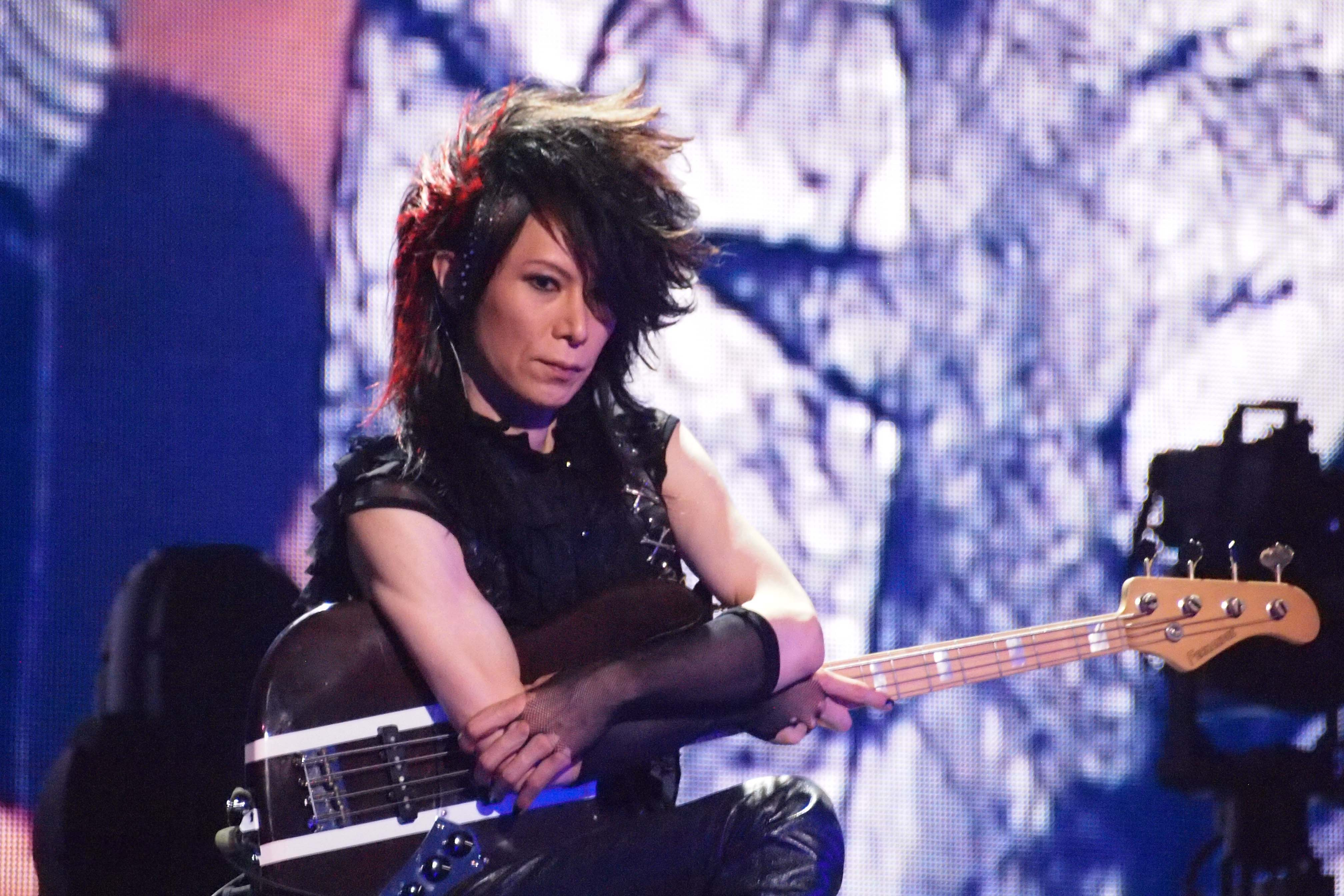
Heath at X Japan's concert at Madison Square Garden, 2014

Heath's first known band was the heavy metal group Paranoia, which he joined in 1986. Vocalist Nov, who later went on to join Aion, explained that when the band was looking for a new bassist, he randomly approached Heath at a live house and asked him to join, without knowing that he was actually a bass player. At the time, Heath had just formed a band called Vanguard with future Justy-Nasty vocalist Kenichi "Rod" Fujisaki, but they disbanded before playing a single show. Paranoia released the album Come From Behind in 1987, which includes the Heath-penned "Honest Promise", before splitting up the following year. In 1988, Heath formed Beet-Sweet with future Eins:Vier members Luna and Yoshitsugu. At his own suggestion, Heath was vocalist of the band. When they broke up after only six months, he formed Chaos Mode with future Eins:Vier vocalist Hirofumi, but left the group shortly thereafter.

After moving to Tokyo in 1990, Heath joined the band Sweet Death. At his suggestion, they changed their name to Media Youth. When they temporarily stopped performing due to the departure of their vocalist, Heath joined Majestic Isabelle in 1991. They notably performed at Extasy Summit '91, an event put on by X drummer Yoshiki's Extasy Records. Heath had previously been introduced to X guitarist Hide through a common friend, and attended their Nippon Budokan concert in May 1990. When Majestic Isabelle went on hiatus in 1991, Heath resumed playing with Media Youth. However, he did not stay with them long, because in May 1992, Hide invited him to join X after a rehearsal with the band. Heath explained that Hide had asked him to record with X as they were lacking a bassist following the departure of Taiji that January and gave him a demo tape of about five songs to learn. After playing with the band in a studio, he received a phone call almost immediately after getting home from Hide, who told him that everyone liked him and to consider officially joining. Once he did, Heath was immediately sent to Los Angeles to re-record the bass parts of his predecessor.

On August 24, 1992, at a press conference in New York City at Rockefeller Center, it was announced that Heath had joined X. At the same time, the band announced the changing of their name from "X" to "X Japan". Heath's first public performance since joining the band was at the October 29, 1992 Extasy Summit, where he was part of a session with many musicians from the various acts that performed at the event, while the year's end saw his first television appearance; the prestigious Kōhaku Uta Gassen event on New Year's Eve 1992. In August 1993, X Japan released Art of Life, which topped the Oricon Albums Chart. However, the members took a break to start solo projects and the band only performed two concerts that year. Titled X Japan Returns, these took place at the Tokyo Dome on December 30 and 31, and were Heath's first proper concerts with the band.

Dahlia, which would become X Japan's last album, was released in November 1996, and once again, it reached the number one spot. It includes Heath's only songwriting credit in the band, the instrumental "Wriggle", which he co-composed with Pata. On September 22, 1997, it was announced that X Japan would disband. They performed their farewell show, aptly titled The Last Live, at the Tokyo Dome on December 31, 1997.

=== 1995–2006: Solo career and Dope HEADz ===
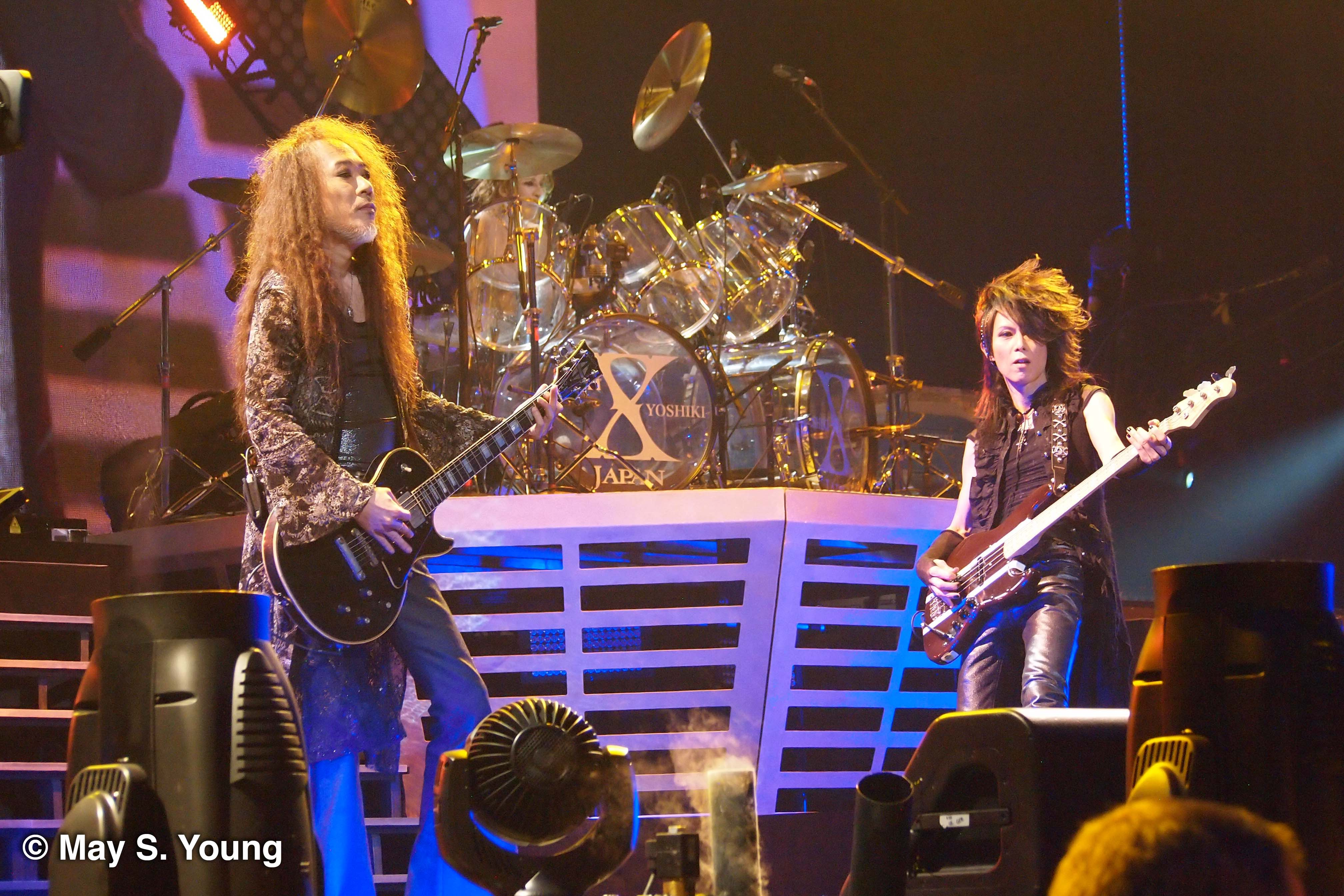
Heath formed the band Dope HEADz with Pata in 2000. (Both pictured with X Japan in 2014.)

In 1995, Heath began a solo career. He released a self-titled box set, containing a five-track CD and a home video, on February 22. His October 1996 single "Meikyuu no Lovers" was used as the ending theme of the Detective Conan anime and reached number 10 on the Oricon Singles Chart. It was followed by "Traitor" in February 1997. The single "Crack Yourself" was released in April 1998, and was followed by his first full-length studio album, Gang Age Cubist. Released in June 1998, the album contains two discs, a "Band Disc" and a "Remix Disc". Heath does not play bass on the former, instead, session musician Ju-ken was hired for that position.

For the 1999 Hide tribute album, Tribute Spirits, Heath teamed up with X Japan guitarist Pata, former Spread Beaver percussionist and programmer I.N.A. and used unreleased vocal recordings of Hide to cover X's song "Celebration". This was the catalyst for Dope HEADz, the band the three formed the following year. I.N.A. later suggested that Heath had wanted to form a band with him because they both liked 1990s industrial music, such as Nine Inch Nails. The two initially became close when Heath first joined X as I.N.A., who worked as a programmer for X, was partnered up with him when they were recording Art of Life in America, and got even closer after Hide died in 1998. When he was suggested as the guitarist, Pata decided to give it a try, but said he would quit if he did not like it. Vocalist Jo:Ya auditioned twice before earning the role of frontman in September 2000. Dope HEADz made their live debut at a New Year's Eve countdown event at Cafe Le Psyence in Yokosuka on December 31, 2000. In 2001, they released two singles, "Glow" in February and "True Lies" in April, followed by their first studio album, Primitive Impulse, in June. The drums for tracks recorded in Los Angeles were provided by Joey Castillo, while the drums for songs recorded in Japan were provided by Ryuichi "Ryu" Nishida, who also toured with the band. The singles both peaked at number 35 on the singles chart, while the album reached number 20 on its chart. However, Jo:Ya left the band after a September 9, 2001, concert at Zepp Tokyo. Dope HEADz recruited Ravecraft vocalist Shame as their new frontman and released the album Planet of Dope in July 2002. Whereas Heath and I.N.A.'s songwriting had dominated the band's first album, Heath did not contribute any material to the second. In March 2003, Dope HEADz announced they were entering a hiatus.

On December 29, 2003, Heath announced a new project with former Craze vocalist Shinichiro Suzuki called Rats, but after the release of their re-recording of his song "Traitor" and a DVD titled Dirty High, the project ended on August 29, 2004. That same year he formed a band called Lynx, with Der Zibet vocalist Issay. Although they performed many concerts between October 31, 2004 and April 15, 2007, they did not release any recordings. In 2005, Heath restarted his solo activities after a seven-year hiatus, releasing three singles that year; "New Skin" and "Come to Daddy" in April, and "The Live" in August. The following year, he released his seventh and final single in August, "Solid", followed by his second and final full-length album in October, Desert Rain.

=== 2007–2023: X Japan reunion ===
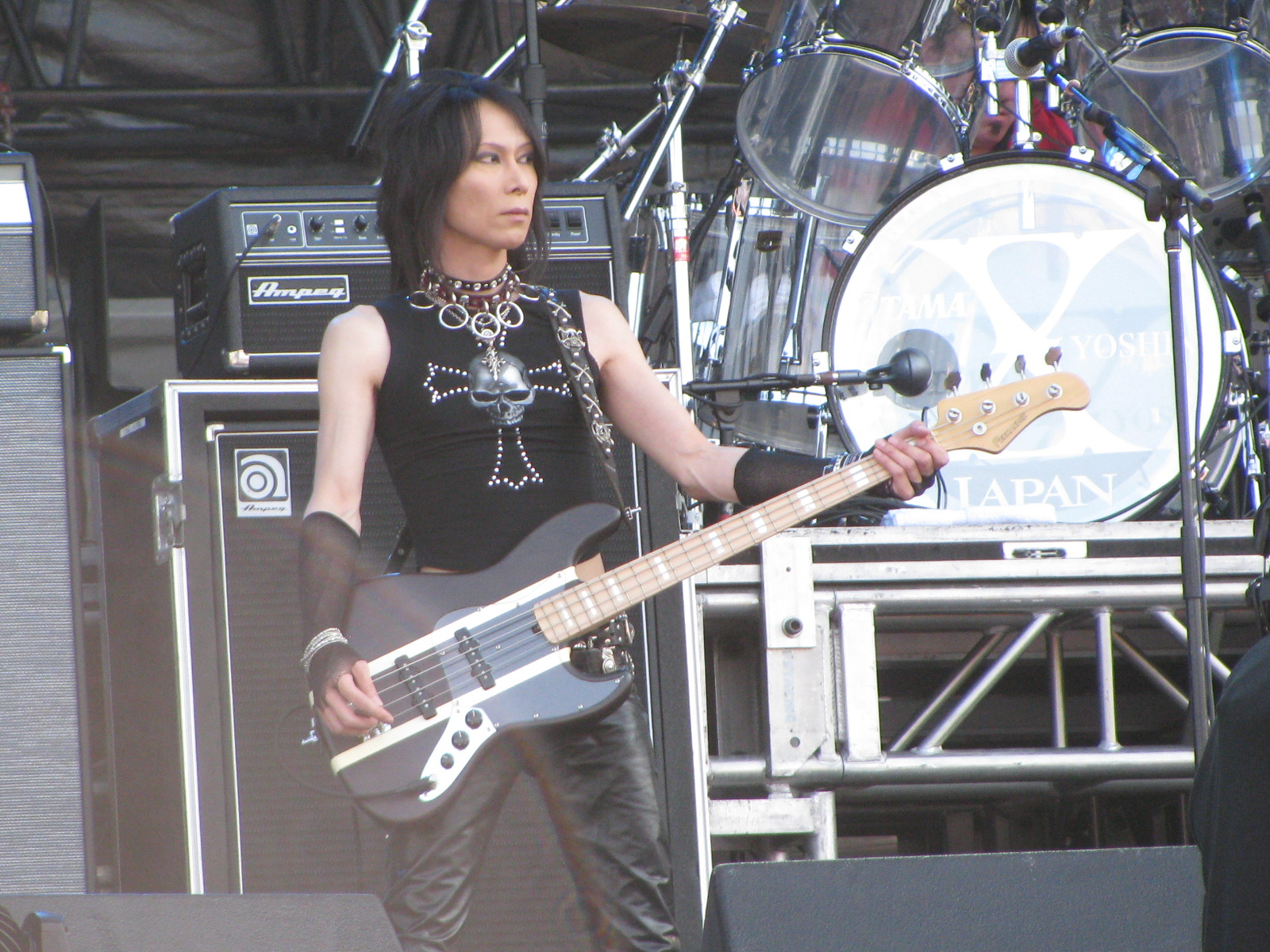
Heath at Lollapalooza in 2010

According to a report by the newspaper Sponichi, X Japan vocalist Toshi visited drummer Yoshiki in Los Angeles in November 2006 to work on a song as a tribute to the late guitarist Hide. In March 2007, Toshi announced on his website that he and Yoshiki had recently resumed working together, stating that a "new project" would commence soon. Rumors of a X Japan reunion subsequently began, and in June Yoshiki was reported as having expressed interest in a tour and that he was in talks with Heath and Pata regarding their participation. On October 22, 2007, X Japan announced their reunion and released the Saw IV theme song, "I.V.".

In mid-March 2009, it was reported in the media that Heath was having issues with his personal management agency, that X Japan's concerts in South Korea on the 21st and 22nd were cancelled as a result, and that the bassist might leave the band. On April 20, Heath's offer to withdraw from X Japan was confirmed to Sankei Sports, but it was not accepted by bandleader Yoshiki. The day before their May 2009 Tokyo Dome concerts, Heath explained that he was questioning who he was as an artist, but decided to stay in the band after talking to Yoshiki. The following year, Heath established a company to manage his music copyrights. He was aided in this task by a woman with whom he went on to have a romantic relationship for over a decade.

In 2010, X Japan went on their first North American tour from September 25 to October 10. Their first world tour began with four gigs in Europe from June 28 to July 4, 2011, and was resumed from September to October with five shows in South America and five in Asia. In response to the 2011 Tōhoku earthquake and tsunami that occurred in Japan on March 11, 2011, Heath supported Toshi in eight concerts throughout western Japan in April. All of the shows were acoustic in support of nationwide power conservation efforts and also featured Luna Sea's Shinya and the Orchestra Ensemble Kanazawa. All proceeds were donated to the Japanese Red Cross to aid the victims.

Heath performed at the 25th anniversary concert of his X Japan bandmate Sugizo that was held at Zepp Haneda on November 29, 2022. He played bass during "Enola Gay Reloaded", "Misogi", and "Tell Me Why?". Heath appeared at the "Evening / Breakfast with Yoshiki 2023 in Tokyo Japan Sekaiichi Gōkana Dinner Show" event on August 20, 2023, where he performed "Rusty Nail" on bass with Yoshiki on piano. It turned out to be his final public performance due to his death two months later. Heath appears on X Japan's sixth studio album, which remains unreleased despite having been completed in 2018.

== Death ==
On November 7, 2023, Josei Seven reported that Heath had died from cancer in late October 2023, at the age of 55. A source told the magazine that the musician had felt unwell since the beginning of the year and that when he went to a doctor, he was diagnosed with cancer that had already progressed to an advanced stage. On November 11, an official statement posted on his website disclosed that Heath was diagnosed with colon cancer in June and died in a hospital on October 29, 2023, after his condition suddenly worsened that month. It was also announced that X Japan leader Yoshiki has been entrusted with organizing a memorial concert per Heath's wishes. A farewell ceremony for Heath was held at Spotify O-East on November 28. The event was attended by approximately 10,000 fans and 100 celebrities, including Pata and Sugizo, and featured Yoshiki performing a piano rendition of "Endless Rain".

Rittor Music published All About Heath on October 23, 2024. It includes a biography of the bassist, interviews with people who knew him, an overview of his equipment, and reprints of interviews he gave to Bass Magazine. Four days later, the "heath the live everliving everloving" event was held at Club Phase in Tokyo. Musical guests included Pata, Sugizo, Jo:Ya, Shame, and Morrie, the last of whom revealed he and Heath had planned to form a band together before the bassist's death. In All About Heath, Morrie explained this was Godland, a duo he was forming with former Gastunk vocalist Baki. Heath had told Morrie that he wanted to accept the September 2023 offer to be in their support band alongside Sugizo and former Dead End drummer Masafumi Minato, but could not as he was undergoing treatment for an unspecified illness.

== Musicianship ==
In 2018, Heath placed seventh in the bassist category of We Rock magazine's "Metal General Election", where readers and professional musicians voted on the best musicians in the history of hard rock and heavy metal. Although typically viewed as having a reserved bass-playing style in comparison to his predecessor in X Japan, Heath could utilize more flashy techniques such as fingerpicking and slapping when he chose. These techniques can be heard on X Japan's songs "Scars" and "Beneath the Skin". In fact, Sugizo, who knew Heath since his days in Majestic Isabelle, said this was the bassist's original style, but he completely changed it when he joined X Japan. The guitarist opined that Heath did not care about Taiji's style or what other people thought, and did whatever he wanted. Sugizo also called Heath the best pick-playing bassist in hard rock/heavy metal. Valentine D.C. bassist Jun expressed admiration for Heath's 8-beat downpicking, with its distinctive shoulder movement, for being both accurate and dynamic.

I.N.A. opined that Heath played bass in a way that would make Yoshiki's drums standout, and that he placed much importance on matching the X Japan drummer's groove. Yoshiki concurred, remarking that Heath valued the song more than pushing his own individuality. When recording X songs penned by Yoshiki, the drummer explained that he would already have the basslines written to some extent, would give Heath three different patterns to play faithfully, and Yoshiki would choose the best one. In contrast, Minoru Kojima, who was the support guitarist for Rats, said Heath would try many different arrangements over and over again when composing. Because he enjoyed industrial rock, Blizard guitarist Takayuki Murakami suggested Heath must have enjoyed the material X Japan wrote after reuniting, such as "I.V." and "Jade". Yoshiki replied by saying he believed Heath supported his goal to evolve the band's sound beyond speed metal.

Heath was meticulous about the sound of his bass, practicing studiously and researching the smallest details of his instrument. Sugizo compared him to The Edge and Shigeru Suzuki in this regard. In addition to playing bass guitar, Heath was a frequent programmer, often tinkering away making tracks. He also sang in his solo career and played guitar. Although Heath was always quiet and reserved off stage, several people, including I.N.A. and Heath's guitar tech Kazuyuki Arai, noted he would become a different and aggressive person on stage. According to his Beet-Sweet bandmate Luna, Heath had a thorough idea of how a musician should be in terms of presence and behavior. Yoshiki remarked that before Heath auditioned for X Japan, he went to see him perform and was impressed when Heath smashed his bass on stage. The bassist continued to destroy his instruments in X, usually during his solo sections of their concerts.

== Equipment ==
After joining X Japan in 1992, Heath signed an endorsement deal with Fernandes Guitars. One of the reasons being that his new bandmate Hide also endorsed the company. His first signature model bass was the XB, which had a B.C. Rich Warlock motif, with a through neck and a short scale. The commercial version is named XB-95H. Although Heath liked the profile of the guitar, he was not satisfied with its sound, which resulted in the EB-HEATH model, made by Fernandes' Burny brand. Based on the B.C. Rich Eagle, the body and neck are made of Hawaiian koa, and it has a longer scale than the XB, a rosewood fingerboard, Badass II bridge and Seymour Duncan Quarter Pound pickups. A second version of this model was made with a first generation Badass bridge. Heath had two other variants of the guitar made directly by Fernandes, titled EB-X HEATH models. With the exception of the previously mentioned bridge on #2, all four have the same specifications and were originally painted black with white stripes. Heath based this paintjob on his image of American automobiles and it became a signature feature of his guitars. However, one of the Fernandes-made models was later painted white with black stripes and had a sticker for the Sex Pot Revenge fashion brand placed on the front of its body. The other Fernandes model was later painted blue for use in Dope HEADz. Heath continued to use the EB model until X Japan disbanded at the end of 1997. The commercial version is named EB-95X.

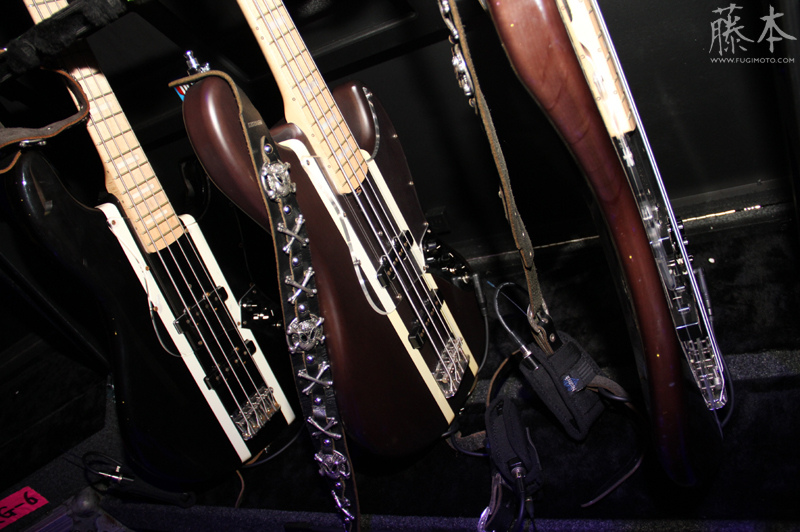
Heath's signature model FJB bass guitars backstage at an X Japan concert in 2011

During his time in Dope HEADz, Heath requested something slightly more compact, with a double cutaway body that was easy-to-play. Burny responded with the DB-heath model, which has an ash body, maple neck, rosewood fingerboard, Fernandes FMM-1 humbucker pickups, and black paintjob. When X Japan reunited in 2007, Heath received a new signature model based on the Fender Jazz Bass. The FJB-heath model has an alder body, maple neck, and Seymour Duncan JB pickups. The prototype has a Badass bridge, rosewood fingerboard, mirror pickguard and a solid black paintjob. But the final version uses a Fernandes JB bridge, maple fingerboard and a clear pickguard to show off the two white stripes that had been added. Commercial versions are named FJB-115H and FJB-125H '19. Including the prototype, six different FJB models were produced in Heath's lifetime. (Note: All About Heath does not include any mention of an "FJB-heath Model #4".) The second model was completed at the same time as the first and was used for half-step down tuning. Originally see-through black, it was repainted around October 2016 to have a red "relic" paint job, which gives an aged and heavily played look. FJB-heath model #3 was made in March 2009 as a backup and was used for irregular tunings. The fifth model was made around June 2015 and returned to a rosewood fingerboard, making it lighter in weight. It has a white relic with black stripes paint job. Heath's final signature model was the FJB-heath model #6, which was completed in April 2018. He was particular about the weight this time, asking for it to be under 4 kg, so Fernandes shaved 2 mm off the typical body thickness to 38 mm and retained the rosewood fingerboard. It has a dark blue relic paint job.

Heath also owned Fender bass guitars; three Jazz Basses that he often used to record and a Precision Bass believed to be from 1978. One of the former had a broken neck that Fernandes fixed under the condition that they could place their logo on it. He also owned several guitars, including two 1990s Burnys, one black and one cherry sunburst, that were based on Gibson Les Pauls and which he used for songwriting and recording demos, and a Fender Custom Shop Stratocaster that reproduces the specifications of a 1960s model. He also owned electro-acoustics; a Fernandes FAA500 and two Ovations, an Adamas II and an Ultra Series 1527.

Toru Saito was Heath's guitar tech since he joined X Japan, and Kazuyuki Arai joined Saito starting with the band's 1996 Tokyo Dome concerts. Both of them remarked how Heath went through guitar strings extremely fast. He initially used nickel strings, until switching to stainless steel in the Dope HEADz days; eventually settling on the Elixir brand. According to Arai and Naoyuki Hyogo of Fernandes, Heath was the type of musician who was always tinkering and trying the latest equipment, whether it be a pickup, effects unit or capacitor. Heath mainly used Mesa/Boogie guitar amplifiers during his initial run with X Japan, Marshalls during his time in Dope HEADz, and finally Ampeg SVTs after X Japan reunited. His signature guitar picks varied throughout his career; from polyacetal to Ultem and celluloid, from triangle to onigiri and teardrop-shaped, and from 1.0 mm to 0.8 mm in thickness.

== Discography ==
Albums

- Heath (February 22, 1995, mini-album)
- Gang Age Cubist (June 10, 1998), Oricon Peak Position: #43
- Desert Rain (October 27, 2006, mail-order only)

Singles

- "Meikyuu no Lovers" (迷宮のラヴァーズ; October 7, 1996) #10

Second ending theme for the Detective Conan anime.

- "Traitor" (February 19, 1997) #35

Theme song for the TV series Toro Asia and the Sega Saturn video game Phantasm.

- "Crack Yourself" (April 22, 1998) #76
- "New Skin" (April 14, 2005, mail-order only)
- "Come to Daddy" (April 14, 2005, mail-order only)
- "The Live" (August 22, 2005, mail-order only)
- "Solid" (August 25, 2006, mail-order only)

Other releases

- Heath (February 22, 1995, VHS sold with his mini-album)
- Heath All of Films 1995.02.22 ~ 1997.12.31 (December 27, 1998, VHS)
- All of Heath (October 23, 2024, 4 CD and 1 DVD compilation box set)

With Paranoia

- Come From Behind (October 21, 1987)

With X Japan

- Art of Life (1993)
- Dahlia (1996)

With Dope HEADz

- "Glow" (February 21, 2001) #35
- "True Lies" (April 25, 2001) #35
- Primitive Impulse (June 6, 2001) #20
- Planet of the Dope (July 24, 2002) #59

With Rats

- "Traitor" (2004, mail-order only)
- Dirty High (2004, DVD, mail-order only)

=== Other work ===
- Tribute Spirits (Various artists, May 1, 1999, "Celebration")
- King of Psyborg Rock Star (Various artists, April 28, 2004, "MISCAST")
- "Red Swan" (Yoshiki feat. Hyde, October 3, 2018, guest bass)
- And the Chaos is Killing Me (Sugizo, July 5, 2023, bass on "Enola Gay Reloaded", "Misogi" and "Tell Me Why?")
