= Longing (song) =

X Japan single

"Longing ~Togireta Melody~"

Single by X Japan

from the album Dahlia
- Released: August 1, 1995
- Recorded: One on One Recording Studios, O'Henry Sound Studios
- Genre: Symphonic metal
- Length: 15:25
- Label: Atlantic
- Songwriter: Yoshiki
- Producer: Yoshiki

X Japan singles chronology
"Rusty Nail" (1994)	"Longing ~Togireta Melody~" (1995)	"Longing ~Setsubou no Yoru~" (1995)

"Longing ~Setsubou no Yoru~"

Single by X Japan
- Released: December 11, 1995
- Recorded: One on One Recording Studios, O'Henry Sound Studios
- Genre: Symphonic metal
- Length: 15:24
- Label: Atlantic
- Songwriter: Yoshiki
- Producer: Yoshiki

X Japan singles chronology
"Longing ~Togireta Melody~" (1995)	"Longing ~Setsubou no Yoru~" (1995)	"Dahlia" (1996)

"Longing" is a ballad by Japanese rock band X Japan and written by Yoshiki. The song has been released in several versions, most notably in two different single variations. The first, "Longing ~Togireta Melody~" (Longing ～跡切れたmelody～), was released as their eleventh single on August 1, 1995, and reached the number 1 spot on the Oricon chart. The second, "Longing ~Setsubou no Yoru~" (Longing ～切望の夜～), is their twelfth released on December 11, 1995, and reached number 5.

== Summary ==
The song was first released as a demo tape titled "Longing ~Togireta Melody~", which was given out at X Japan's December 30–31, 1994 Tokyo Dome concerts. The demo also included a recording of the band practicing "Longing", "Break the Darkness", "Scars" and "Dahlia". In 2007, this demo tape was re-released on CD in the Aoi Yoru Shiroi Yoru Complete Edition, a DVD set of the two concerts where it was first released.

The first single of the song, released on August 1, 1995, is very similar to the demo, although it is nearly a minute longer and includes drums, which the demo lacked. This is the version of the song that was included on the album Dahlia. Released on December 11, 1995, the second single "Longing ~Setsubou no Yoru~", only includes Toshi's vocals and a symphony, and is more melancholic than the other. This single's third track is an English version of the song, where, instead of Toshi singing, Yoshiki reads the lyrics as one would a poem.

David Lynch directed a television commercial to promote "Togireta Melody". Shot on a beach in Malibu, it only features Yoshiki. He also created a music video for "Setsubou no Yoru", that was recorded in a Los Angeles studio and at Coyote Dry Lake, though it has never been released. In his 2018 autobiography, Lynch described the experience as "really fun" and said, "Some of the frames are so fuckin' beautiful you can't believe it." Behind the scenes footage of the making of these videos is included in the 2016 We Are X documentary.

A live performance of the "Togireta Melody" version was included as a B-side of the 1997 "Forever Love (Last Mix)" single, titled "Longing (Bootleg)" due to the poor audio quality of the recording. Yoshiki created another orchestrated instrumental version of the song, titled "Longing", for his 2005 solo album Eternal Melody II.

== Commercial performance ==
The first single "Longing ~Togireta Melody~" reached number 1 on the Oricon charts, and charted for 11 weeks. In 1995, with 476,170 copies sold it was the 76th best-selling single of the year, being certified Platinum by RIAJ. The second single, "Longing ~Setsubou no Yoru~", reached number 5 on the chart and charted for 7 weeks.

== Track listing ==
All tracks are written by Yoshiki. "Togireta Melody" arranged by X Japan, "Setsubou no Yoru" arranged by Yoshiki.

"Longing ~Togireta Melody~"
No.	Title	Length
1.	"Longing ~Togireta Melody~" (Longing ～跡切れたmelody～)	7:45
2.	"Longing ~Togireta Melody~ (Original Karaoke)" (Longing ～跡切れたmelody～ (オリジナル・カラオケ))	7:40

"Longing ~Setsubou no Yoru~"
No.	Title	Length
1.	"Longing ~Setsubou no Yoru~" (Longing ～切望の夜～)	4:59
2.	"Longing ~Setsubou no Yoru~ (Original Karaoke)" (Longing ～切望の夜～ (Original Karaoke))	5:28
3.	"Longing ~Setsubou no Yoru~ (The Poem)" (Longing ～切望の夜～ (The Poem))	4:57

== Personnel ==
=== "Longing ~Togireta Melody~" ===
- Co-Producer – X Japan
- Orchestra arranged by – Yoshiki, Dick Marx, Shelly Berg
- Scored by – Tom Halm
- Mixed by – Mike Shipley
- Recorded by – Rich Breen, Mike Ging
- Assistant engineers – Tal Miller, Mike Stock, Cappy Japngie, Richard Landers
- Mastered by – Stephen Marcussen (Precision Studio)
- A&R Directed by – Hiro Inoguchi, Yoshinobu Toida
- Art direction and design – Mitsuo Izumisawa
- Executive producers – Ryuzo "Jr." Kosugi, Takashi Kamide, Sekiji Murata, Yukitaka Mashimo

=== "Longing ~Setsubou no Yoru~" ===
- Co-Producer – X Japan
- Orchestra arranged by – Yoshiki, Dick Marx, Shelly Berg
- Scored by – Tom Halm
- Sound effects by – Yoshiki, Toshi
- Mixed by – Rich Breen (tracks 1 & 2), Mike Ging (track 3)
- Recorded by – Rich Breen, Mike Ging
- Assistant engineers – Tal Miller, Cappy Japngie, Richard Landers
- Mastered by – Stephen Marcussen (Precision Studio)
- A&R Directed by – Yoshinobu Toida, Hiro Inoguchi
- Executive producers – Ryuzo "Jr." Kosugi, Takashi Kamide, Sekiji Murata, Yukitaka Mashimo
- Art direction and design – Shige "#11" Komai
- Flower photography – Hajime Kuroda
