= Perfect Best =

Compilation album by X Japan
- Released: February 24, 1999
- Genre: Heavy metal, speed metal, power metal, symphonic power metal, progressive metal
- Length: 2:26:14
- Label: Atlantic

X Japan chronology
Star Box (X Japan album) (1999)	Perfect Best (1999)	Best: Fan's Selection (2001)

Perfect Best is a compilation album by Japanese heavy metal band X Japan, released on February 24, 1999. It includes songs that go from their debut album Vanishing Vision to Dahlia, and also an interview with Yoshiki. Some tracks are taken from Live Live Live Tokyo Dome 1993-1996. The album reached number 4 on the Oricon chart. It was certified gold by RIAJ.

Although there is no description in particular, all tracks are remastered for this album.

== Track listing ==
Disc One

1. "Prologue ~ World Anthem" (1993 Live)
2. "I'll Kill You"
3. "Blue Blood" (1993 Live)
4. "Rusty Nail"
5. "Say Anything" (1995 Live)
6. "Vanishing Love"
7. "Tears"
8. "Art Of Life" (Radio Edit Version)
9. "Kurenai" (Deep Red)
10. "Stab Me In The Back" (1988 Live)
11. "Standing Sex" (1993 Live)
12. "Dahlia"

Disc Two

1. "Week End" (1995 Live)
2. "Sadistic Desire"
3. "Endless Rain" (1993 Live)
4. "Forever Love"
5. "Orgasm" (1996 Live)
6. "X" (1993 Live)
7. "The Last Song"

Disc Three

1. "Yoshiki Special Interview"
