= Live Live Live Extra =

Live album by X Japan
- Released: November 5, 1997
- Recorded: Tokyo Dome (December 31, 1995 & 1996)
- Genre: Heavy metal, speed metal, power metal
- Length: 51:05
- Label: Warner Music Japan
- Producer: Yoshiki

X Japan live chronology
Live Live Live Tokyo Dome 1993–1996 (1997)	Live Live Live Extra (1997)	Live in Hokkaido 1995.12.4 Bootleg (1998)

Live Live Live Extra is a live album released by X Japan on November 5, 1997. Supplemental to the previously published Live Live Live Tokyo Dome 1993-1996, it contains more recordings from the band's annual New Year's Eve concerts at the Tokyo Dome. All tracks on this album were recorded on December 31, 1996, with the exception of "Piano Solo", which was taken from the 1995 performance. The album reached number 13 on the Oricon chart.

== Track listing ==
No.	Title	Length
1.	"Kurenai"	7:02
2.	"Wriggle"	1:27
3.	"Heath Solo"	4:22
4.	"hide Solo"	8:02
5.	"Piano Solo"	5:26
6.	"Drum Solo"	9:02
7.	"Orgasm"	15:43
