= I.V. (song) =

Single by X Japan
- Language: English
- Released: January 23, 2008
- Recorded: 2007
- Genre: Heavy metal
- Length: 5:04
- Label: Extasy
- Songwriter: Yoshiki
- Producer: Yoshiki

X Japan singles chronology
"The Last Song" (1998)	"I.V." (2008)	"Scarlet Love Song -Buddha Mix-" (2011)

"I.V." is a song by Japanese rock band X Japan, released on January 23, 2008, as a digital download. It was the group's first new material since "The Last Song," released almost a decade earlier in 1998. "I.V." is the main theme for the American film Saw IV, which was released on October 26, 2007.

== Overview ==
An X Japan reunion was announced in mid-2007, with Yoshiki, Toshi, Heath and Pata all participating. In July, Yoshiki was approached about composing the main theme for Lionsgate's Saw IV (he also composed Lionsgate's Catacombs main theme), Yoshiki chose to perform the song with X Japan.

In October Lionsgate released the production notes for the movie, and according to them, X Japan would perform the main theme. This was confirmed on the 18th with an official announcement. "I.V." (written by Yoshiki) would feature Toshi, Heath, Pata and Yoshiki, along with unreleased guitar tracks by former guitarist hide, who died in 1998. According to Yoshiki, the version released is a shortened version of his original work, which was too long to fit the movie.

In regards to the meaning of the track's title "I.V.", Yoshiki originally used it as an acronym for intravenous drip, although he later noticed it would fit with the movie's title.

Originally the song was going to be released on the Saw IV soundtrack, but Yoshiki preferred to release it as an X Japan single. The song was eventually released worldwide on January 23 via the iTunes Store topping the iTunes charts in Japan and being featured under "What's hot" in America. The song was released in over 20 countries worldwide.

The song was featured as one of 20 free downloadable songs released for owners of Rock Band 2; notably, it was the first song from a Japanese band to make an appearance in a music video game made in and for the Western market.

"I.V." has been reported to be included on X Japan's unreleased album.

== Music video ==
The promotional video for the song was filmed on October 22 on the rooftop of Aqua City, Odaiba, Tokyo. The video shows the band playing on a big stage, on the top of a Tokyo skyscraper. During the video, some shots of hide are shown from the Shibuya monitor with 10,000 fans watching from the street. Additionally, hide's Fernandes MG-120X guitar can be seen on a stand, at the left side of the stage. At the end, the band is playing the last chorus in the rain. The production, with helicopters and fire trucks to create artificial rain, cost ¥42 million. The music video was released on January 22, 2008, inside the special features for the Saw IV home video, and later on February 29 included in the band's own X Japan Returns Complete Edition DVD box set.

The group also filmed a second video for the song on January 9, 2010, on the roof of the Kodak Theatre in Hollywood, California, featuring its newest band member, Sugizo.

== Personnel ==
- Toshi – lead vocals
- Hide – guitars
- Pata – guitars, backing vocals
- Heath – bass guitar, backing vocals
- Yoshiki – drums, piano, producer
