= Scorpio (Trax song) =

- Japanese cover

Single by Trax
- Released: December 14, 2004
- Genre: Rock, nu metal
- Label: Avex Trax (Japan); SM Entertainment (Korea)
- Songwriter: Jay
- Producer: Yoshiki

Trax singles chronology
| "Paradox" (2004) | "Scorpio" (2004) | "Rhapsody" (2005) |

"Scorpio" is a single released by South Korean rock band Trax. It was recorded and released in two versions: Japanese and Korean.

The single was produced by X Japan's Yoshiki, who also composed the music to the title track, and includes a cover of X Japan's "Tears" in either Japanese or Korean. Yoshiki later helped write the lyrics to TRAX's second Japanese single "Rhapsody".

The Japanese release included a 20-page color booklet. The Korean version has the additional track "Over the Rainbow" in two different versions.

It was also the final Korean release to feature drummer, Rose, who would leave in 2006.

== Lyrics ==
The Japanese version of the title song has the first and second verses in English and the chorus and third verse in Japanese. The Korean version also has the first and second verses in English, but the chorus and third verse are in Korean.

The Japanese version has no parental advisory for coarse language. It has four instances of profanity ("fuck" is said three times and another word is bleeped).

== Japanese track listing ==
Label: Avex Trax
Released: December 14, 2004
Track list:

1. "Scorpio"
2. "Tears (TRAX Version)" (X Japan Cover)
3. "Beat Traitor"
4. "Knife"

== Korean track listing ==
Label: SM Entertainment
Released: December 17, 2004
Track list:

1. "Scorpio"
2. "Tears (TRAX Version)" (X Japan Cover)
3. "Beat Traitor"
4. "Knife"
5. "Over the Rainbow (Piano Version)"
6. "Over the Rainbow (Rock Version)"
