= Tears (X Japan song) =

Single by X Japan

from the album Dahlia
- Released: November 10, 1993
- Studio: One on One Recording (track 1); Air Studios (track 2)
- Genre: Symphonic metal
- Length: 15:36
- Label: MMG
- Songwriter: Yoshiki
- Producers: Yoshiki (track 1); George Martin (track 2)

X Japan singles chronology
"Say Anything" (1991)	"Tears" (1993)	"Rusty Nail" (1994)

Audio sample
- "Tears": file; help

"Tears" is the ninth single by the Japanese rock band X Japan, released on November 10, 1993.

== Overview ==
The song was debuted/first performed on December 31, 1992, on a broadcast of NHK's Kouhaku Uta Gassen. It is the band's first single to be released under the name X Japan and the first to feature Heath on bass. The ballad was written and composed solely by Yoshiki about the death of his father, but he co-credited it to the alias Hitomi Shiratori (白鳥瞳) because he was concerned how fans would react to a softer song from the band. It would later appear on the album Dahlia and was also used as the theme song for the Japanese TV drama Nikushimi ni Hohoende (憎しみに微笑んで).

The B-side is the lyric-less classical version of the song, which was previously on Yoshiki's solo album Eternal Melody. It was produced, arranged and conducted by famed music producer George Martin and performed by the London Philharmonic Orchestra.

A live performance of "Tears" was included as the B-side to their 1996 single "Dahlia". Yoshiki's MySpace streams a different version of the song entitled "Tears (Unreleased Version)". A new version of "Tears" was reportedly recorded for X Japan's unreleased studio album, before it was decided to create entirely new material instead.

The title song was covered by South Korean rock band TRAX, as a b-side on the Japanese version of their "Scorpio" single, which was produced by Yoshiki. They also covered it in Korean on the Korean version of their aforementioned single. The song was also covered by MC the Max in 2002, titled Goodbye for Now (잠시만 안녕).

In 2004, "Tears" was used as the theme song for the film Windstruck, becoming the first Japanese song to be featured in a Korean film after World War II.

== Commercial performance ==
The song reached number 2 on the Oricon charts, and charted for 16 weeks. In 1993, with 380,150 copies sold was the 77th best-selling single of the year, and in 1994, with 456,790 copies sold was the 50th best-selling single. By July 1996, it was certified as double Platinum by RIAJ, making it the band's best-selling single.

== Track listing ==
All music is composed by Yoshiki, track 1 lyrics by Hitomi Shiratori and Yoshiki.

No.	Title	Length
1.	"Tears" (X Japan Version)	10:28
2.	"Tears" (Classic Version)	5:02

== Personnel ==
X Japan

- Toshi – vocals
- Pata – guitar
- Hide – guitar
- Heath – bass
- Yoshiki – drums, piano, synthesizer

Track one

- Co-producer – X Japan
- Strings arranger, conductor – Dick Marx
- Strings performer – Y&D Orchestra
- Engineers – Rob Jacobs, Rich Breen, Mike Ging
- Assistant engineers – Mike Stock, Tal Miller
- Mixing – Mike Shipley
- Mastering – Stephen Marcussen

Track two

- Producer, arranger and conductor – George Martin
- Performers – London Philharmonic Orchestra
- Engineer and mixing – Haydn Bendall
- Assistant engineers – Geoff Foster, Steve Orchard
- Mastering – Chris Blair
