= X Japan Clips II =

Video by X Japan
- Released: October 24, 2001
- Genre: Heavy metal, power metal, progressive metal
- Label: Atlantic

X Japan chronology
Dahlia Tour Final 1996 (1997)	X Japan Clips II (2001)	The Last Live Video (2002)

X Japan Clips II is a compilations DVD/VHS released by X Japan on October 24, 2001. It consists of several music videos and concert excerpts from the band's later years. The live portions were recorded at the Tokyo Dome, all on December 31 of various years (see track listing).

== Track listing ==
1. "Amethyst" (1995)
2. "Rusty Nail" (1996)
3. "Scars" (1996)
4. "Week End" (1996)
5. "Forever Love"
6. "Crucify My Love"
7. "Dahlia"
8. "White Poem"
9. "Drain"
10. "Kurenai" (1996)
11. "Tears" (1995)
12. "Forever Love" (1997)
