= Art of Life Live =

Live album by X Japan
- Released: March 18, 1998
- Recorded: Tokyo Dome, December 30–31, 1993
- Genres: Symphonic power metal, Progressive metal
- Length: 34:08
- Label: Polydor

X Japan live chronology
Live in Hokkaido 1995.12.4 Bootleg (1998)	Art of Life Live (1998)	The Last Live (2001)

Art of Life Live is an X Japan live album released on March 18, 1998. It is composed solely of one song, "Art of Life". Mostly recorded on December 31, 1993 (the piano solo part is from the night before) at the Tokyo Dome. The album reached number 20 on the Oricon chart. This same performance was released on DVD and VHS, as Art of Life 1993.12.31 Tokyo Dome, five years later.

== Track listing ==
1. "Art of Life" – 34:08

== Reviews ==
Art of Life Live
Review scores
Source	Rating
Heavy Metal Tribune	9.6/10 stars

Heavy Metal Tribune describes the live version of Art of Life as "perhaps the most epic power metal song that I have ever come across", and that the reviewer prefers the live version to the more polished studio version because of the entire atmosphere.
