= Art of Life =

1993 studio album by X Japan

Studio album by X Japan
- Released: August 25, 1993
- Recorded: April 1991 – June 1993
- Studios: One on One Recording, The Complex, Enterprise, Master Control, Pacifique, Devonshire, Red Zone, Abbey Road Studios
- Genres: Symphonic metal; power metal; progressive metal
- Length: 29:00
- Language: English
- Label: Atlantic
- Producer: Yoshiki

X Japan chronology
Jealousy (1991)	Art of Life (1993)	Dahlia (1996)

Art of Life is the fourth studio album by Japanese heavy metal band X Japan, released on August 25, 1993, by Atlantic Records. The album consists solely of the 29-minute orchestrated title track, which was written and composed by Yoshiki entirely in English and recorded with the Royal Philharmonic Orchestra. It topped the Oricon chart and has sold over 600,000 copies. The album is the band's first after changing their name from simply X and the first to feature bassist Heath.

== Overview ==
I think I tried to convince even myself not to die. Try to keep going. It's a very positive message I think. Because [...] I was very suicidal. [...] I just hated life a lot of times. That's also the message for people, also myself as well. I had to convince myself to keep going. Then I wrote the song.

— Yoshiki, about the message of Art of Life

With the release of two successful studio albums, Blue Blood in 1989 and Jealousy in 1991, X Japan was hugely popular for a metal/rock band in Japan and were selling out the country's largest indoor concert venue, the Tokyo Dome, yearly. But in 1992 bassist Taiji left the group and was replaced by Heath.

Also in 1992, Yoshiki bought a recording studio complex in North Hollywood, California, United States. Known as One on One Recording Studios, it would later be renamed Extasy Recording Studios and become the place where recordings for nearly all his projects take place. For the release of Art of Life, X Japan left Sony and signed a deal with Atlantic Records, and like the previous album it was not completely recorded in Japan or Los Angeles, but in several different places, most notably One on One Recording Studios in the US and Abbey Road Studios in London (orchestra only). Art of Life was originally intended to be a song on Jealousy, with the album split across two CDs, but the release of the song was postponed by three years. According to music critic Tetsushi Ichikawa, the delay was "because of Yoshiki's 'ruthless' perfectionism on vocal direction. Furthermore, various business issues eventually stopped the recording of Art of Life and the album Jealousy was released with one piece."

The heavily orchestrated piece (recorded with the Royal Philharmonic Orchestra) comprises several passages of varying speeds and instrumentation, including numerous verses, with no set chorus, several harmonized guitar solos, and eight minutes performed solely on piano. The music was inspired by Franz Schubert's Unfinished Symphony. In 2011, Yoshiki recalled that he wrote the song in roughly two weeks and that recording took approximately two years. For the lyrical theme, he said he drew from his own life, particularly from how he felt suicidal when his father died.

The album cover art was made using an actual X-ray image of Yoshiki's skull. He faced trouble getting the X-ray done, as hospitals refused to take the image without a medical condition to justify the radiation.

The song was unveiled at a concert at the Nippon Budokan on July 30, 1992. Art of Life was released on August 25, 1993, and reached number one on the Oricon chart. However, X Japan only performed two concerts that year, as each member began solo careers. These concerts were held at the Tokyo Dome on December 30 and 31 and titled X Japan Returns, marking the beginning of a New Year's Eve tradition that would last until the group's disbandment.

In 1998 a live album composed solely of "Art of Life", combined from these two concerts and titled Art of Life Live, was released by Polydor Records. It reached number twenty on the charts. Both concerts were released in their entirety on DVDs in 2008 as X Japan Returns 1993.12.30 and X Japan Returns 1993.12.31. The latter was originally released in 2003 on VHS and DVD as Art of Life 1993.12.31 Tokyo Dome. The third movement of "Art of Life" is included on the 2017 We Are X soundtrack.

== Performance ==
In the initial counting week of September 1993, Art of Life reached number one on the Oricon chart, with sales of 337,490 copies. By the end of the year it had sold 513,000 copies and was the 28th-best-selling album of the year. By 2013, Art of Life had sold over 600,000 copies.

== Reception ==
Professional ratings
Review scores
Source	Rating
Sputnikmusic	5/5 stars

Nick Butler of Sputnikmusic gave Art of Life a perfect 5 out of 5 score and referred to it as "Japan's 'Stairway to Heaven' – a multi-layered song with a near-mythical reputation, that crystallizes everything that made the band so great." Feeling that a comparison to Dream Theater's similarly themed A Change of Seasons was inevitable, he stated that "Art of Life" is "more emotional, diverse, intense, impressive, and epic" and that X's members are more technically skilled at their instruments. He finished by praising the track as "undoubtedly, the best song I have ever heard."

Kazuaki Nakatsuka of Re:minder opined that Toshi's vocal performance on Art of Life deserves just as much praise, if not more, than the instrumentalists' and cited his impassioned cry at the song's end as particularly moving. Noting that his vocal health during recording was far from ideal, Hirose described his performance, "Grasping every nuance of the sonic landscape—which unfolds like a grand emaki created by Yoshiki—Toshi meticulously weaves together the melodies and lyrics" and sings "as if he were sacrificing himself".

== Legacy ==
In 2021, Metal Hammer included Art of Life on a list of The 25 Best Symphonic Metal Albums.

Originally, "Art of Life" was only played live a handful of times. The first took place on July 30, 1992, at the Nippon Budokan and two more at the previously mentioned December 30 and 31, 1993 concerts at the Tokyo Dome. However, since reuniting in 2007, X Japan has been performing the song, or parts of it, regularly, first at the band's reunion concert on March 28, 2008, at the Tokyo Dome. For the song a hologram of the deceased Hide (created using footage from one of the 1993 performances) played alongside the band, though the song was cut short when Yoshiki collapsed midway through, just before the piano solo. The rest of the song was played at the same venue two days later. It was once again played at the Tokyo Dome on May 3, 2009, starting from the second movement, and at the AsiaWorld-Expo in Hong Kong on January 16 (first movement) and 17 (second movement), 2009. The second movement has been played as the last song at every one of their concerts since 2010.

A new version of "Art of Life" was reportedly recorded for X Japan's unreleased studio album, before it was decided to create entirely new material instead.

== Track listing ==
No.	Title	Music	Length
1.	"Art of Life"	Yoshiki	29:00
Total length:			29:00

== Personnel ==
X Japan

- Vocals: Toshi
- Guitar: Pata
- Guitar: hide
- Bass: Heath
- Drums, piano, synthesizer: Yoshiki

Additional musicians

- Orchestra: Royal Philharmonic Orchestra
- Conductor, strings arrangement, orchestration: Dick Marx

Production

- Producer: Yoshiki
- Co-producer: Naoshi Tsuda, X
- Recording and Mixing engineer: Richard Breen
- Strings arrangement, orchestration: Shelly Berg
- MIDI programming: Kazuhiko Inada
