= Star Box (X Japan album) =

Compilation album by X Japan
- Released: January 30, 1999
- Genre: Heavy metal, speed metal, power metal
- Length: 1:13:14
- Label: Sony

X Japan chronology
| Single Box (1997) | Star Box (1999) | Perfect Best (1999) |

Star Box is a compilation album by X Japan, released on January 30, 1999. This compilation is very similar to B.O.X ~Best of X~, the only difference is that some tracks were replaced ("Desperate Angel", "Sadistic Desire") with others ("Love Replica", "Blue Blood", "Xclamation", "Miscast"), partly due to the death of Hideto Matsumoto a year back. In 2004 it was released in the United States, but this time included the video X Clips. The album reached number 4 on the Oricon chart.

== Track listing ==
1. "Kurenai" (紅)
2. "Joker" (1992 Live)
3. "Blue Blood"
4. "Endless Rain"
5. "Miscast"
6. "Celebration"
7. "Love Replica"
8. "Xclamation"
9. "Week End" (1992 Live)
10. "Silent Jealousy"
11. "X" (1992 Live)
12. "Say Anything"
