= Crucify My Love =

Single by X Japan

from the album Dahlia
- Released: August 26, 1996
- Recorded: One on One Recording, Hit Factory, December 31, 1995 at Tokyo Dome (track 2)
- Genre: Symphonic rock
- Length: 10:53
- Label: Atlantic
- Songwriter: Yoshiki
- Producer: Yoshiki

X Japan singles chronology
"Forever Love" (1996)	"Crucify My Love" (1996)	"Scars" (1996)

"Crucify My Love" is the fifteenth single by Japanese heavy metal band X Japan, released on August 26, 1996. A power ballad, "Crucify My Love" is written and performed entirely in English, unlike most of the band's songs.

== Summary ==
Its B-side is a live version of one of the band's earlier singles, "Week End", recorded on December 31, 1995 at the Tokyo Dome.

"Crucify My Love" was covered by Spanish gothic metal band Gothic Dolls on their 2008 album The Last Breath. It was the ending theme of the TV programme Tonight 2 (トゥナイト2) on Asahi TV, and used in Nippon Oil's ZOA television advertisement.

== Commercial performance ==
The single reached number 2 on the Oricon charts, and charted for 9 weeks. It is certified Gold by RIAJ.

== Track listing ==
All tracks are written by Yoshiki and arranged by X Japan.

No.	Title	Length
1.	"Crucify My Love"	4:38
2.	"Week End ('95 Tokyo Dome Live Version)"	6:15

== Personnel ==
- Co-Producer – X Japan
- Orchestra arranged by – Yoshiki, Dick Marx, Shelly Berg
- Scored by – Tom Halm
- Orchestra – American Symphony Orchestra
- Mixed by – Mike Ging
- Recorded by – Mike Ging, Rich Breen
- Assistant engineers – Tal Miller, Carl Nappa, Paul Falcone
- Mastered by – Stephen Marcussen
- A&R directed by – Osamu Nagashima
- Art directed by – Shige "#11" Komai
- Executive producers – Ryuzo "Jr." Kosugi, Yukitaka Mashimo
