= Blue Blood Tour Bakuhatsu Sunzen Gig =

Video by X Japan
- Released: June 1, 1989 (VHS)/(LD); September 9, 2001 (DVD)
- Recorded: March 16, 1989
- Genres: Heavy metal, speed metal, power metal
- Length: 59.42
- Label: Ki/oon

X Japan chronology
| Blue Blood Tour; Bakuhatsu Sunzen Gig (1989) | Shigeki! Visual Shock Vol. 2 (1989) |

Blue Blood Tour Bakuhatsu Sunzen Gig is a live VHS/LD released by X Japan on June 1, 1989. It contains footage from the band's performance at "Shibuya Kohkaido" on March 16, 1989. The video was re-released on DVD on September 9, 2001.

== Track listing ==
1. "Prologue ~ World Anthem"
2. "Blue Blood"
3. "Sadistic Desire"
4. "Easy Fight Rambling"
5. "Week End"
6. "Stab Me in the Back"
7. "Piano Solo"
8. "Drum Solo"
9. "Guitar Solo"
10. "Kurenai"
11. "Orgasm"
12. "I'll Kill You"
13. "20th Century Boy"
14. "X"
15. "Unfinished"
