= Forever Love (X Japan song) =

- Original release

Single by X Japan

from the album Dahlia
- Released: July 8, 1996
- Recorded: One on One Recording, Hit Factory, December 31, 1997 at Tokyo Dome (track 2, 1997 reissue & 2001 reissue)
- Genre: Symphonic rock
- Length: 17:20 (original release)
- Label: Atlantic, Polydor (1997 reissue)
- Songwriter: Yoshiki
- Producer: Yoshiki

X Japan singles chronology
"Dahlia" (1996)	"Forever Love" (1996)	"Crucify My Love" (1996)

"Forever Love" is the fourteenth single by Japanese heavy metal band X Japan, released on July 8, 1996.

== Summary ==
The song was written and composed by Yoshiki. It appears on the soundtrack of the 1996 animated feature film X. An acoustic version appears on their November 1996 album Dahlia.

The single has been reissued several times. On December 18, 1997, following the announcement of the band's breakup, a different mixed version was released with a live version of "Longing" (recorded at "The Last Live" concert) as a B-side. The original single was reissued again on July 22, 1998, after the death of guitarist hide. A single containing all previous versions (except original karaoke version), as well as a live recording (also recorded at "The Last Live" concert) of the song was released on July 11, 2001.

== Lyrics and origin ==
The lyrics of Forever Love are written in Japanese and English. In a 2026 interview with Billboard Japan, Yoshiki explained the origin of the song:

I've lived a pretty chaotic life. And, although I don't think it's a good thing, to be honest, I didn't intend to live long. My father took his own life, so I was pretty pessimistic about life. I thought that I myself would disappear at some point. However, I also thought that the music I create might live on forever, and that's the meaning behind "Forever Love." I remember creating this song with the meaning that we will all disappear someday, but love is eternal.

== Alternative covers ==
1997 reissue

1998 reissue

2001 reissue

== Commercial performance ==
The single reached number 1 on the Oricon charts, and charted for 15 weeks. In 1996, with 509,920 copies sold was the 47th best-selling single of the year, being certified Platinum by RIAJ. The edition released in 1997 reached number 13, and charted for 11 weeks, while those in 1998 and 2001 reached number 18 and 19 respectively, and both charted for 4 weeks.

== Legacy ==
In 2001, "Forever Love" was used as background music in several commercials for the Japanese Liberal Democratic Party. LDP member Junichiro Koizumi, at that time the country's Prime Minister, has expressed fondness for X Japan's music.

To commemorate the 30th anniversary of X Japan, Yoshiki and Toshi's hometown of Tateyama, Chiba began broadcasting a music box arrangement of "Forever Love" on its disaster-prevention radio system at 5:00 pm every Friday, Saturday, Sunday and national holiday on December 24, 2012. On November 20, 2014, Tateyama Station began broadcasting a piano rendition of the song in its pedestrian overpass every hour between 8:00 am and 6:00 pm. To commemorate its 100th anniversary, the station changed the departure melody of its trains to "Forever Love" on November 9, 2019.

In 2012, "Forever Love" was covered by both Mr. Big singer Eric Martin in Mr. Rock Vocalist and Megamasso singer Inzargi in Visualist: Precious Hits of V-Rock Cover Song for their respective cover albums. Awoi covered it for the compilation album Counteraction - V-Rock covered Visual Anime songs Compilation-, which was released on May 23, 2012, and features covers of songs by visual kei bands that were used in anime. Death metal band Gyze included a cover of the song on the Japanese edition of their 2019 album Asian Chaos. It was also covered by Mary's Blood for their 2020 cover album Re>Animator, and by Mayo Suzukaze for her 2021 album Fairy ~A・I~ Ai.

On August 28, 2026, Yoshiki released an orchestral live version of "Forever Love" recorded at Walt Disney Concert Hall, featuring Josh Groban singing vocals in both Japanese and English.

== Track listing ==
All tracks are written by Yoshiki and arranged by X Japan.

Original release/1998 reissue
No.	Title	Length
1.	"Forever Love"	8:41
2.	"Forever Love (Original Karaoke)"	8:38

1997 reissue
No.	Title	Length
1.	"Forever Love (Last Mix)"	8:31
2.	"Longing (Bootleg)"	7:56

2001 reissue
No.	Title	Length
1.	"Forever Love"	8:41
2.	"Forever Love (Live)"	8:06
3.	"Forever Love (Acoustic Version)"	7:55
4.	"Forever Love (Last Mix)"	8:31

== Personnel ==
- Co-Producer – X Japan
- Orchestra arranged by – Yoshiki, Dick Marx, Shelly Berg
- Scored by – Tom Halm
- Orchestra – American Symphony Orchestra
- Mixed by – Mike Ging
- Recorded by – Mike Ging, Rich Breen, Stan Katayama, Kazuhiko Inada
- Assistant engineers – Tal Miller, C.J. Devillar, Dokk Knight, Carl Nappa, Paul Falcone
- Mastered by – Stephen Marcussen (Precision Studio)
- A&R directed by – Osamu Nagashima
- Art directed by – Shige#11
- Executive producers – Ryuzo "Jr." Kosugi, Yukitaka Mashimo
- Acoustic guitar – Bill Whiteacre ("Forever Love (Last Mix)")
