= Scars (X Japan song) =

Single by X Japan

from the album Dahlia
- Released: November 18, 1996
- Recorded: One on One Recording
- Genre: Speed metal
- Length: 8:33
- Label: Atlantic
- Songwriter: hide
- Producer: Yoshiki

X Japan singles chronology
"Crucify My Love" (1996)	"Scars" (1996)	"Forever Love (Last Mix)" (1997)

"Scars" is the sixteenth single by Japanese rock band X Japan, released on November 18, 1996.

== Summary ==
"Scars" is the band's only single to be written by someone other than Yoshiki, as it was written by the band's lead guitarist hide. The song was originally titled "Scars on Melody", and its B-side is a remix version of "White Poem I" from Dahlia. According to Alexey Eremenko of Allmusic, "Scars" was a glimpse into hide's future experiments in industrial rock.

The single was reissued with a different jacket cover featuring hide on July 22, 1998, following his death on May 2.

The single reached number 15 on the Oricon charts and charted for 5 weeks. The 1998 reissue also reached number 15. The song was used as one of many opening themes to the music television show Count Down TV.

== Track listing ==
No.	Title	Writer(s)	Arrangement	Length
1.	"Scars"	Hide	X Japan	5:05
2.	"White Poem I (M.T.A. Mix)"	Yoshiki	Yoshiki	3:28

== Personnel ==
- Co-producer – X Japan
- Mixed by – Eric Westfall
- Recorded by – Mike Ging, Kazuhiko Inada
- Assistant engineers – C.J. Devillar, Tal Miller, Mario (track 2), Dave Heron (track 2)
- Programming by – Kazuhiko Inada
- Remixed by – Rob Chiarelli (track 2)
- Mastered by – Stephen Marcussen
- A&R directed by – Osamu Nagashima
- Art directed by – Shige#11
- Designed by – Shigeru Komai
- Executive producers – Ryuzo "Jr." Kosugi, Yukitaka Mashimo
