= Rusty Nail (song) =

Single by X Japan

from the album Dahlia
- Released: June 10, 1994
- Recorded: One on One Recording, Sedic, Sound City Studio
- Genre: Heavy metal
- Length: 5:27
- Label: Atlantic
- Songwriter: Yoshiki
- Producer: Yoshiki

X Japan singles chronology
"Tears" (1993)	"Rusty Nail" (1994)	"Longing" (1995)

"Rusty Nail" is the tenth single by Japanese heavy metal band X Japan, released on June 10, 1994.

== Summary ==
"Rusty Nail" was written and composed by Yoshiki and later appeared on the album Dahlia. The song was used as the theme song for the 1994 Japanese TV drama Kimi ga Mienai (君が見えない).

A new version of "Rusty Nail" was reportedly recorded for X Japan's unreleased studio album, before it was decided to create entirely new material instead.

Swedish metal band Dragonland added a cover of the song to the Japanese edition of their 2004 album Starfall. Changmin of Tohoshinki covered the song during the band's fifth Japanese tour, Tone: Live Tour 2012. It was also covered by Inugami Circus-dan for Crush! 3 - 90's V-Rock Best Hit Cover Love Songs-, which was released on June 27, 2012 and features current visual kei bands covering love songs by visual kei artists of the 90's.

== Music videos ==
Two music videos have been made for "Rusty Nail". The first is an anime version created in 1994 in collaboration with manga artists Clamp and animated by Mook Animation, that includes cartoon versions of the band members. It was included on VHS with the 1999 Perfect Best compilation album. In September 2014, the video was uploaded to Yoshiki's YouTube account.

The second was released on the X Japan Showcase in L.A. Premium Prototype DVD on September 6, 2010. Directed by Aaron Platt and mainly shot as the band performed live on top of the Kodak Theatre in Hollywood, California in January 2010, it has the sound of the audience added to the audio.

In the video game X Japan Virtual Shock 001, released for the Sega Saturn on October 20, 1995, the player edits a live video of "Rusty Nail" using footage from the Shiroi Yoru concert.

== Commercial performance and legacy ==
The song reached number 1 on the Oricon charts, and charted for 20 weeks. In 1994, with 712,390 copies sold was the 28th best-selling single of the year, being certified Platinum by RIAJ, is the band's second best-selling single.

Yoshiki revealed that a part of "Rusty Nail" inspired his 2018 song "Red Swan", which was a collaboration with Hyde. Its cover art, with blood dripping from a person's mouth, also inspired the cover art of the newer song.

== Track listing ==
All tracks are written by Yoshiki.

No.	Title	Length
1.	"Rusty Nail"	5:27
2.	"Rusty Nail (Original Karaoke)"	5:27

== Personnel ==
- Co-Producer – X Japan
- Orchestra arranger – Neko Saito
- Mixing – Mick Ging
- Recording engineers – Rich Breen, Mick Ging, Shinichi Tanaka, Motonari Matsumoto
- Assistant engineers – Mike Stock, Tal Miller, Naoya Takahashi
- Mastering – Chris Bellman
- A&R direction – Yoshinobu Toida
- Art direction and design – Mitsuo Izumisawa
- Executive producers – Takayuki Takeshi, Sekiji Murata, Ryuzo "Jr." Kosugi
