= The Last Live Video =

Video by X Japan
- Released: (DVD/VHS, tracks omitted for time) - March 29, 2002 (Complete Edition DVD) - October 26, 2011 (Complete Edition Blu-Ray) - September 25, 2013
- Recorded: Tokyo Dome, December 31, 1997
- Genres: Heavy metal, speed metal, power metal, progressive metal
- Label: Atlantic

X Japan chronology
| X Japan Clips II (2001) | The Last Live Video (2002) | Art of Life 1993.12.31 Tokyo Dome (2003) |

The Last Live Video is a live DVD/VHS released by X Japan on March 29, 2002. It contains the band's last concert performance, before their reunion in 2007, recorded at the Tokyo Dome on December 31, 1997. The Last Live was also released on a three CD set of the same name, just a year before.

In 2011, this concert was reissued as The Last Live COMPLETE EDITION, a DVD with both a standard and limited-edition collector's box option. This version includes 4 more songs omitted from the original video release. The Complete Edition was reissued again as a High Definition Blu-Ray in 2013.

== Track listing ==
Disc one

1. "Amethyst (S.E.)""
2. "Rusty Nail"
3. "Week End"
4. "Scars"
5. "Dahlia"
6. "Drum Break"
7. "Drain"
8. "Piano Solo"
9. "Crucify My Love"
10. "Longing ~Togireta Melody~"
11. "Kurenai"
12. "Orgasm"

Disc two

1. "Drum Solo"
2. "Forever Love"
3. "Prologue (~World Anthem) (S.E.)"
4. "X"
5. "Endless Rain"

Tracks included in the "Complete Edition" re-release in 2011/13

1. Say Anything (S.E.)
2. The Last Song
3. Tears (S.E.)
4. Unfinished (S.E.)
