= Dahlia (song) =

Single by X Japan

from the album Dahlia
- Released: February 26, 1996
- Recorded: One on One Recording, Hit Factory (track 1), December 30, 1993 at Tokyo Dome (track 2)
- Genre: Speed metal, symphonic metal
- Length: 15:59
- Label: Atlantic
- Songwriter: Yoshiki
- Producer: Yoshiki

X Japan singles chronology
| "Longing" (1995) | "Dahlia" (1996) | "Forever Love" (1996) |

"Dahlia" is the thirteenth single by Japanese heavy metal band X Japan, released on February 26, 1996.

== Summary ==
"Dahlia" went on to become the title track of the band's 1996 album and one of Yoshiki's last compositions in his signature blend of speed and symphonic metal. The song's title, "Dahlia", appears in the lyrics as an acronym during a voice over, which says "destiny, alive, heaven, love, innocence, always, destroy, aftermath, hell, life, infinite".

The single was released with two different covers. The B-side is a live version of "Tears", recorded on December 30, 1993, at the Tokyo Dome. The same recording also appears on their live compilation album Live Live Live Tokyo Dome 1993-1996.

== Commercial performance ==
The single reached number 1 on the Oricon charts, and charted for 8 weeks. In 1996, with 412,810 copies sold was the 72nd best-selling single of the year, being certified Platinum by RIAJ.

== Track listing ==
All tracks are written by Yoshiki, except track 2 lyrics by Hitomi Shiratori and Yoshiki. All tracks arranged by X Japan.

| No. | Title | Length |
|---|---|---|
| 1. | "Dahlia" | 7:59 |
| 2. | "Tears ('93 Tokyo Dome Live Version)" | 8:00 |

== Personnel ==
- Co-Producer – X Japan
- Orchestra arranged by – Yoshiki, Dick Marx, Shelly Berg
- Scored by – Tom Halm
- Orchestra – American Symphony Orchestra
- Mixed by – Yuji Sugiyama
- Assistant engineers – Tal Miller, Brad Haehnel, Takaoki Saitoh, Cappy Japngie
- Recorded by – Rich Breen, Mike Ging
- Mastered by – Stephen Marcussen (Precision Studio)
