= Shelly Berg =

American pianist and music educator (born 1955)

Shelton "Shelly" Glen Berg (born August 18, 1955) is an American classical and jazz pianist and music educator. He is the dean of the Frost School of Music at the University of Miami in Coral Gables, Florida and the school's Patricia L. Frost Professor of Music.

== Early life and education ==
Berg was born in Cleveland, the son of entrepreneur and jazz trumpeter Jay Berg. At the age of six, he entered the Cleveland Institute of Music, studying classical piano with Maxine Priest. At age nine, he composed his first work for a children's choir and orchestra at the opening of a synagogue. His father took him to sit in at jazz jam sessions beginning at age 12. He was introduced to gospel piano by organist Ricky C. Watkins, son of Pentecostal Church Bishop Charles Watkins, who recorded for Savoy, Praise, and LaCross. In middle school he played piano for Heights Youth Theater and summer stock musicals. He was also an accompanist for the vocal group Happiness Unlimited.

At age 15, Berg moved with his family to Houston, where he continued classical piano studies with Lucien Lemieux. He performed at jam sessions with jazz saxophonist Arnette Cobb and with Gatemouth Brown. He was the student conductor for choirs at Clear Creek High School and played French horn and trumpet in the band.

Berg earned a Bachelor of Music in Piano Performance (1977) and a Master of Music in Piano Performance (1979) from the University of Houston School of Music, where he studied piano with Albert Hirsh and Abbey Simon, and was the student conductor for choir and orchestra. During his freshman year he substituted for a week with the Woody Herman Band. He lectured at the University of Houston from 1979 to 1981 and was a teaching assistant in music theory from 1977 to 1979.

== Career ==
=== San Jacinto College (1981 to 1991) ===
Berg began his career at San Jacinto College North in Northshore, Houston, Texas, as chair of instrumental music from 1979 to 1981. He then served as chair of instrumental music and commercial music at San Jacinto College in Pasadena, Texas from 1981 to 1991. He performed with trumpeter Larry Martinez and singer Marilyn Savage in Larry and Marilyn and the Brass Connection He learned to play Latin montunos from Kido Zapata during this time. He composed and arranged music for regional and national advertising campaigns and worked with Mickey Gilley and Bill Watrous.

=== University of Southern California (1991 to 2007) ===
In 1991, Berg moved to Los Angeles to join the music faculty at the University of Southern California Thornton School of Music. He was the McCoy/Sample endowed professor of jazz from 2004 to 2007, chair of Jazz Studies from 1994 to 2004, professor from 1998 to 2007, associate professor from 1995 to 1998, and assistant professor from 1991 to 1995.

=== International Association for Jazz Education president (1996 to 1998) ===
Berg was president of the International Association for Jazz Education from 1996 to 1998. He was named one of three "Educators for the Millennium" by The Los Angeles Times in 1999 and received the Dean's Award for Scholarship and Research from the USC Thornton School of Music in 2005.

=== Compositions and productions (1993 to present) ===
He wrote Jazz Improvisation: The Goal-Note Method (Kendor), the Chop-Monster jazz improvisation series (Alfred), Essentials of Jazz Theory series (Alfred), and co-wrote Rhythm Section Workshop for Jazz Directors (Alfred) plus arrangements for big band published by Kendor and Walrus.

Berg worked with Hollywood studio arranger Dick Marx and Tom Halm at Sunset Sound Recording Studios. He was a composer and arranger for the CBS television series A League of Their Own (1993), the weekly ABC television series Fudge (1995–1997), and was orchestrator for the motion picture Almost Heroes. He recorded with the Shelly Berg Trio, including The Joy (DMP, 1995), The Will: A Tribute to Oscar Peterson (CARS, 1998), and Blackbird (Concord, 2005). In 2006, he arranged songs on the album Ray Sings, Basie Swings (Concord, 2006) and was music director and pianist on the Great Performances television show We Love Ella! A Tribute to the First Lady of Song (PBS, 2007).

=== University of Miami Frost School of Music dean (2007 to present) ===
In 2007, Berg was named dean of Frost School of Music at the University of Miami in Coral Gables, Florida. He is a teacher for the Frost Experiential Music Curriculum. Berg is a Steinway artist, music director of The Jazz Cruise, artistic advisor to Larry Rosen's JazzRoots Series at the Adrienne Arsht Center for the Performing Arts of Miami-Dade County, and host of the monthly Generation Next radio show on SiriusXM.

== Awards and honors ==
- Grammy Award nomination, Best Instrumental Arrangement Accompanying Vocalist(s), "Out There" by Lorraine Feather, Tales of the Unusual
- Grammy Award nomination, Best Instrumental Arrangement Accompanying Vocalist(s), "What a Wonderful World" by Gloria Estefan, Gloria Estefan: The Standards, 2014
- Grammy Award nomination, Best Arrangement Instrumental and Vocals, "Be My Muse" by Lorraine Feather, Flirting with Disaster, 2015
- Grammy Award nomination, "There's a Boat that's Leaving Soon for New York/I Loves You Porgy" by Clint Holmes, Rendezvous, 2017
- Educators for the Millennium, The Los Angeles Times, 1999
- Berk Leadership Award, International Association of Jazz Educators, 2002
- Jazz Educator of the Year, Los Angeles Jazz Society, 2003
- Number one jazz album, Blackbird, at JazzWeek, 2005
- Proclamation Honoring Leadership in the Arts, City of Miami, 2009
- Oro Valley Legend of Jazz Award, South Arizona Arts & Cultural Alliance, 2010
- Inside Out Award, University of Miami Alumni Association, 2011
- Jazz Education Achievement Award, DownBeat magazine, 2011
- Knight Arts Champion, John S. and James L. Knight Foundation, 2017
- 12 Good Men 2017 Honoree, Ronald McDonald House Charities, 2017
- Champion of the Arts Award, Citizens Interested in the Arts, 2017

== Discography ==
=== As leader ===
- The Joy (DMP, 1996)
- The Will (CARS, 1997)
- First Takes (Azica, 2005)
- Blackbird (Concord Jazz, 2005)
- Meeting of Minds with Dick Hyman (Victoria, 2008)
- The Nearness of You (Arbors, 2009)
- The Deep (Chesky, 2017)
- Gershwin Reimagined (Decca, 2018)
- Alegria (ArtistShare, 2024)

=== As sideman ===
With Lorraine Feather

- Ages (Jazzed Media, 2010)
- Attachments (Jazzed Media, 2013)
- Dooji Wooji (Sanctuary, 2005)
- Flirting with Disaster (Jazzed Media, 2015)
- Language (Jazzed Media, 2008)
- Math Camp (Relarion, 2018)
- Such Sweet Thunder (Sanctuary, 2003)
- Tales of the Unusual (Jazzed Media, 2012)

With Bill Watrous

- Bone-ified (GNP Crescendo, 1992)
- A Time for Love (GNP Crescendo, 1993)
- Space Available (Double-Time, 1997)

With others

- Patti Austin, Sound Advice (Shanachie, 2011)
- Carmen Bradford, Home with You (Azica, 2004)
- Ray Charles & Count Basie, Ray Sings Basie Swings (Hear Music/Concord, 2006)
- Bruce Eskovitz, Regions (Backstage, 2003)
- Renee Fleming, Christmas in New York (Decca, 2014)
- Keb Mo, Moonlight, Mistletoe & You (Concord, 2019)
- Kiss, Psycho Circus (Mercury, 1998)
- Monica Mancini, Ultimate Mancini (Concord, 2004)
- Rich Matteson, Pardon Our Dust We're Making Changes (Four Leaf Clover, 1990)
- Arturo Sandoval, A Time for Love (Concord Jazz, 2010)
- Arturo Sandoval, Dear Diz (Concord Jazz, 2012)
- Livingston Taylor, Safe Home (Chesky, 2017)

== Film, television, video, podcast, and radio ==
As composer / arranger / orchestrator / performer / musical director

Year	Label	Title	Notes
2020	PBS	Jonathan Antoine: Going the Distance also Sony DVD	performance
2019	PBS	Yoshiki: Live at Carnegie Hall	orchestration (with Yoshiki)
2019	PBS	Gloria & Emilio Estefan: The Library of Congress Gershwin Prize for Popular Song	music director, orchestration, performance
2019	Jazz Cruise	Joey Alexander and Shelly Berg Jazz Cruise Conversations, Podcast Episode 18	interviewer, performance (Apple, Spotify)
2019	NAMM	Shelly Berg: NAMM Oral History Program	interview, National Association Music Merchants
2019	The Sessions	Shelton Berg: Dean, Frost School of Music, University of Miami	interview, The Sessions Panel, (YouTube)
2019	Frost	Music Masters: Take on Keith Jarrett	performance, commentary (YouTube)
2019	Kino Lorber	Lifeline / Clyfford Still documentary	composer, orchestration, performance, production
2018	PBS	Tony Bennett: The Library of Congress Gershwin Prize for Popular Song	performance, 2018, Emmy winner
2016	PBS	White House Holiday Tree Lighting	orchestration, performance, musical direction, 2016, 2014, 2013
2015	Sirius XM	Generation Next Real Jazz Sirius XM	monthly program host, 2015–present
2015	NBC	Macy's July 4th Spectacular	arranging, orchestration, production
2015	PBS	Renée Fleming: Christmas in New York	arranging
2014	PBS	Gloria Estefan: The Standards also Sony DVD	arranging, orchestration, performance, musical direction
2014	PBS	Jazz and The Philharmonic also Sony DVD	arranging, orchestration, performance, musical direction
2010	NPR	Jim Cullum's Riverwalk Jazz	performance, 13 episodes, 2007–2010
2007	PBS	We Love Ella	arranging, orchestration, performance, musical direction
2006	Warner Bros.	For Your Consideration (feature film)	orchestration
2005	Miramax	Cinderella Man (Academy Award-winning feature film, Golden Globe nominations)	performance
2005		Imo Wo Dakshimete (Japanese television series)	arranging and orchestrating
2000	Fox	Men of Honor (feature film)	arranging, performance and production
2000	HBO	Dennis Miller Live (weekly television series)	composing, arranging, performance, production
1999	HBO	Dennis Miller Millennium Special	composing, arranging, performance, production
1999	Warner Bros.	Three to Tango (feature film)	arranging, orchestration, production
1999	Lifetime	Two Cups of Joe	orchestration, performance
1999	NBC	The 60s (miniseries)	composing, performance, orchestration
1998	NBC	Almost Heroes (feature film)	orchestration
1997	ABC	Fudge, weekly television series 1995–1997	composing, arranging, performance, production
1993	CBS	A League of Their Own, weekly television series	composing, arranging, performance, production
1988	ESPN	US Olympic Festival	composing, arranging, performance, production
1988	PBS	Great American Jazz Piano Competition	performance
1986	ESPN	Turn It On for 1986 U.S. Olympic Festival television show	composing, arranging, performance, production
