= The Last Live (X Japan album) =

Live album by X Japan
- Released: May 5, 2001
- Recorded: Tokyo Dome, December 31, 1997
- Genres: Heavy metal, speed metal, power metal
- Length: 189:06
- Label: Polydor

X Japan live chronology
Art of Life Live (1998)	The Last Live (2001)

The Last Live is an X Japan live album released on May 5, 2001. It contains what was to be the band's last concert, recorded at the Tokyo Dome on December 31, 1997. While the band has since reunited, this remains their final concert with guitarist Hideto "hide" Matsumoto, who died five months thereafter. A DVD/VHS version was also released, titled The Last Live Video. The album reached number 7 on the Oricon chart. In 2020, Jonathan McNamara of The Japan Times listed it as one of the 10 Japanese albums worthy of inclusion on Rolling Stone's 2020 list of the 500 greatest albums of all time.

== Track listing ==
Disc 1
No.	Title	Length
1.	"Amethyst"	6:19
2.	"Rusty Nail"	6:12
3.	"Week End"	6:07
4.	"Scars"	9:31
5.	"Dahlia"	8:00
6.	"Drum Break"	2:00
7.	"Drain"	4:29
8.	"Piano Solo"	5:41

Disc 2
No.	Title	Length
1.	"Crucify My Love"	7:18
2.	"Longing ~Togireta melody~" (Longing ~跡切れたmelody~)	7:41
3.	"Kurenai" (紅)	7:55
4.	"Orgasm"	18:53
5.	"Drum Solo"	14:10
6.	"Forever Love"	12:41

Disc 3
No.	Title	Length
1.	"Prologue"	2:47
2.	"X"	16:46
3.	"Endless Rain"	17:16
4.	"Curtain Call (Say Anything)"	11:02
5.	"The Last Song"	13:32
6.	"Epilogue (Tears)"	10:47
