= 17 Hertz Studio =

Recording studio in Los Angeles

Coordinates: 34.166196°N 118.375697°W

- Founded: 2012
- Founder: Jason Gluz
- Status: Inactive
- Location: North Hollywood, California, U.S.
- Official website: 17hertz.com

17 Hertz Studio was a recording studio complex in North Hollywood, Los Angeles originally established in 1972 as One on One Recording.

== Background ==
One on One Recording was established by Jim David, son of songwriter Hal David, in 1972, occupying a former department store in North Hollywood. The studio gained recognition for its sound quality, particularly for drums, and hosted the recording of Metallica's self-titled album, which was certified 16× platinum. The studio was also included in Metallica's 1992 documentary, A Year and a Half in the Life of Metallica.

A range of artists recorded albums at One on One Recording, including Metallica's ...And Justice for All, Testament's The Ritual, Dream Theater's Awake, Fiona Apple's When The Pawn..., Kiss's Crazy Nights and Psycho Circus, and Alice in Chains' Dirt. Megadeth's Rust in Peace was mixed at the studio.

In 1993, Yoshiki, leader of the band X Japan, acquired the studio due to his interest and the inability to book recording time because of the studio's busy schedule. He transformed it into his private recording facility, later renaming it Extasy Recording Studios.

The studio underwent another change in 2012 when 17 Hertz LLC took ownership, refurbishing the facility and rebranding it as 17 Hertz Studio.

== Clients ==
Acts which used the facility include Metallica, Megadeth, Testament, Dream Theater, Kiss, Alice in Chains, Michael Jackson, Jimi Hendrix, The Temptations, Hal David, Burt Bacharach, Dionne Warwick, Michael McDonald, Heart, Sammy Hagar, Bad English, Etta James, Aretha Franklin, Mötley Crüe, Tom Petty, Lita Ford, A Perfect Circle, Poison, Earth, Wind & Fire, Dirtyphonics, and Sullivan King.

Current independent and major Label clients of 17 Hertz Studio include Universal Music Group, Def Jam, Mo Town, Interscope, Atlantic Records, BMG Chrysalis, Warner Music Group, Sony Music, Akon, Alex Da Kid, Birdman, Bone Thugz N Harmony, Boyz II Men, CeeLo Green, Goodie Mob, Chance The Rapper, Crooks & Castles, Deezle, French Montana, Gareth Emery, Jabbawockeez, Lewis Hamilton, Mann, Mark Ronson, Prince Royce, Ray Dalton, Rita Ora, Skylar Grey, Stalley, Orgy, T.I., Tyler, The Creator, Wyclef Jean, Halsey, Lido, Papa Roach, Jeremih, Lil Yachty, Taking Back Sunday, BJ The Chicago Kid, Zendaya, and YG.

== Studio rooms ==
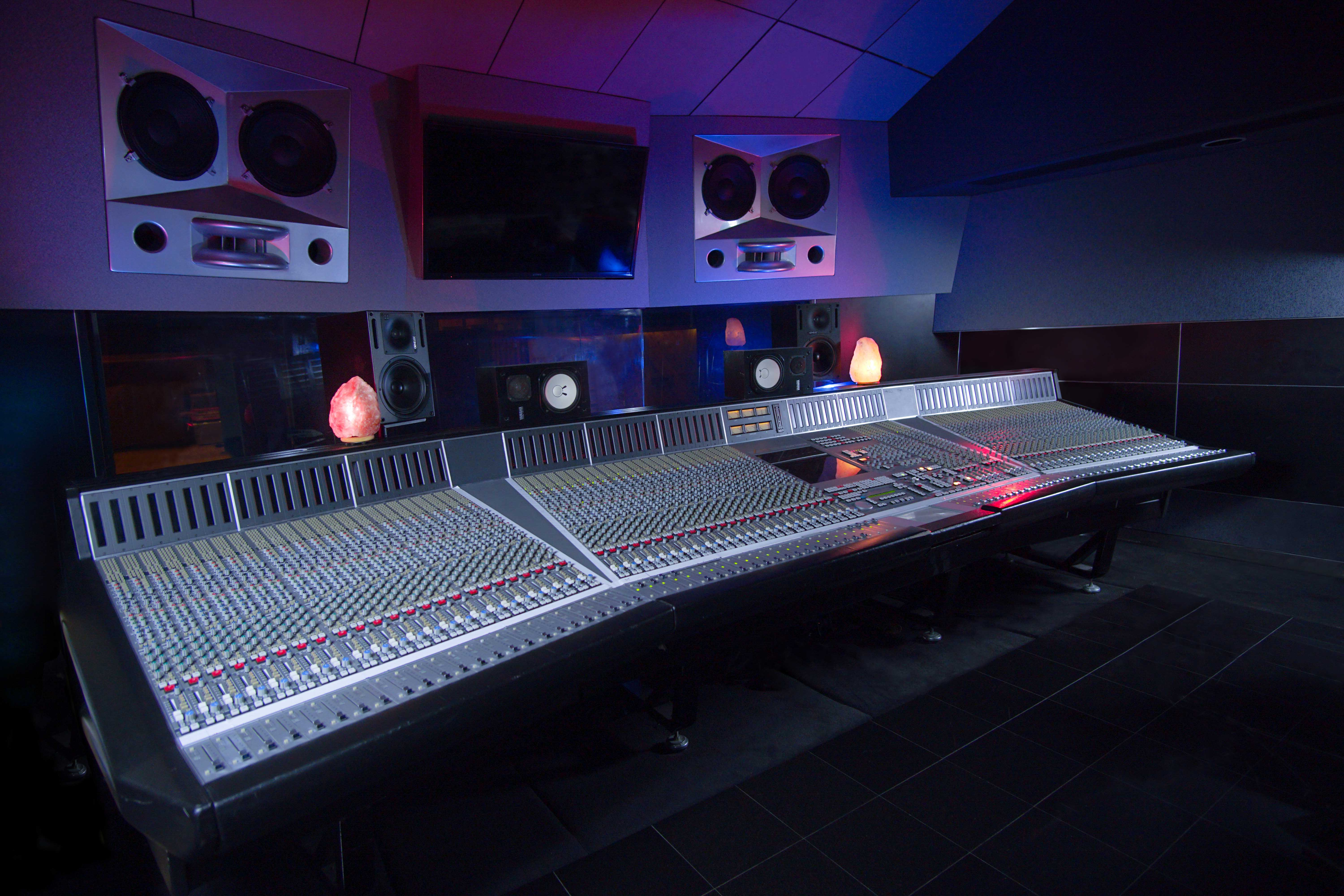
Studio A control room

There are various studio rooms at 17 hertz studios, such as studio A, and studio B. Studio A has a 2,148 square foot live room Studio B (called The Grey Room), includes a control room, live room, machine room, and vocal booth.

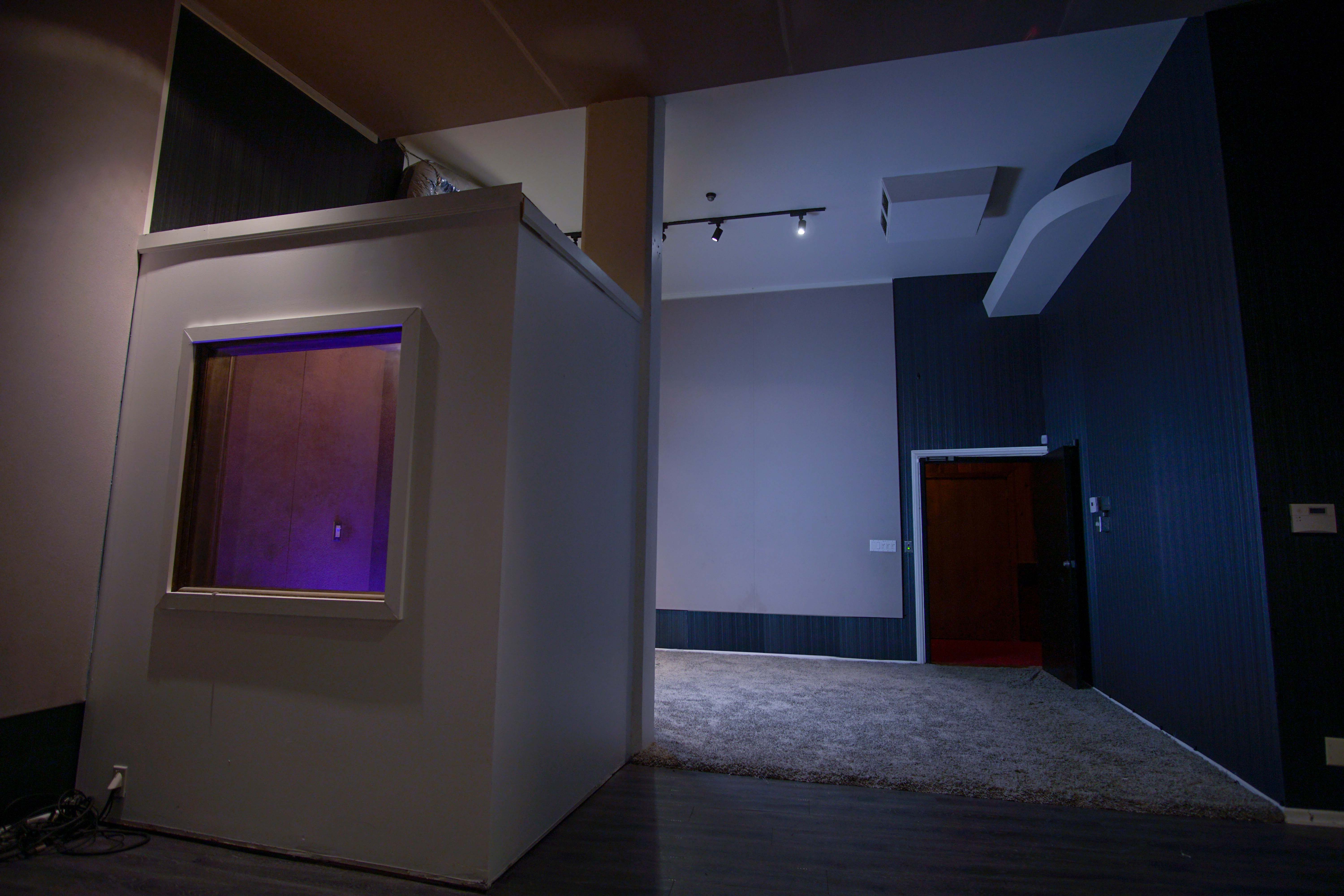
Studio C, currently unequipped

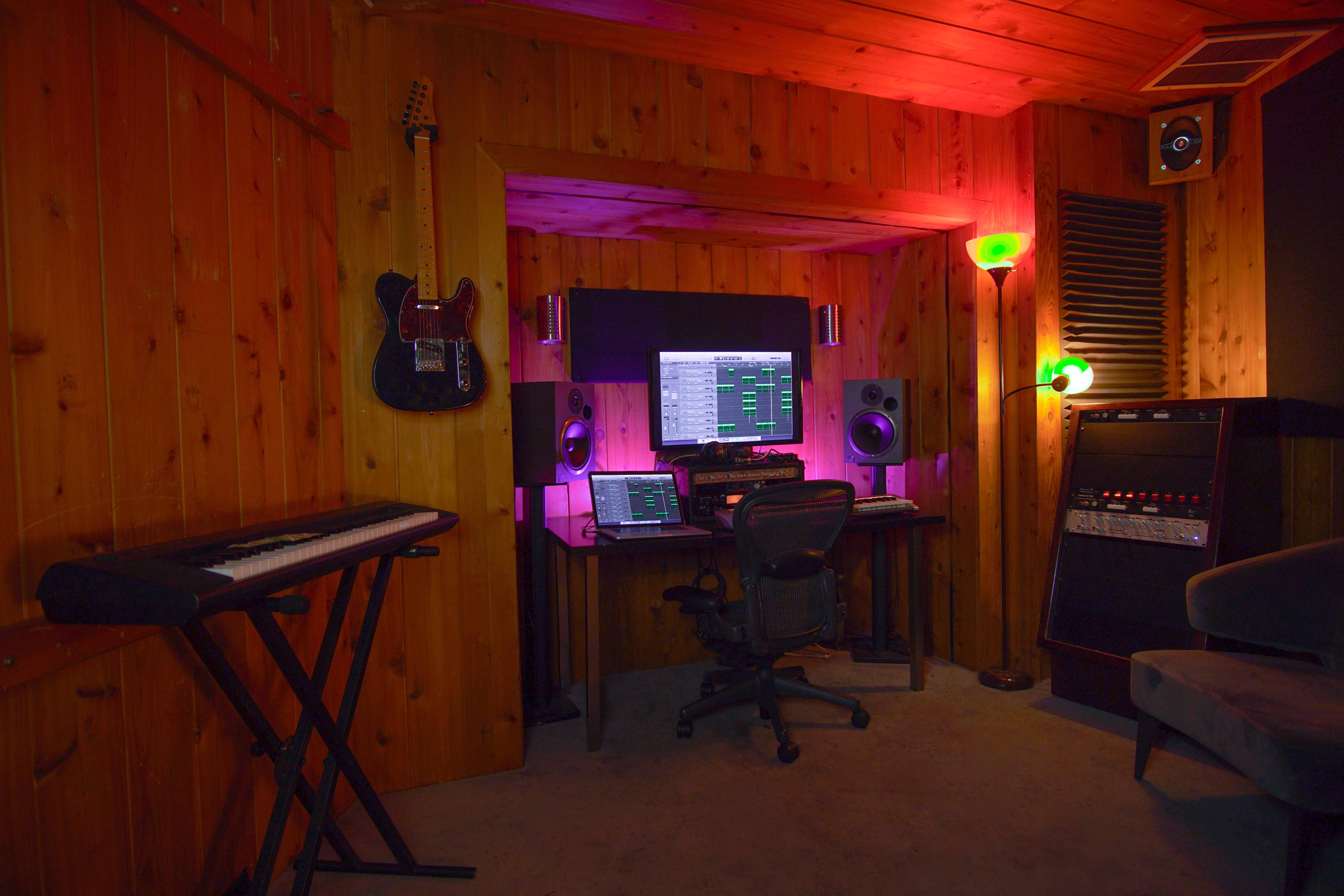
The Cabin production room
