= Jungle (Taiji song) =

2000 song performed by Taiji

- Cover of Uchuu o Kakeru Tomo e: Densetsu no Bando X no Sei to Shi

Instrumental by Taiji
- Released: April 20, 2000
- Studio: Tad Pole, Setagaya
- Genre: Heavy metal
- Length: 5:49
- Label: Tokuma Shoten
- Songwriter: Taiji
- Producer: Taiji

"Jungle" is an instrumental song composed by Japanese musician Taiji. Recorded during sessions for X Japan's album Jealousy (1991), it features himself on bass, Hide on guitar, and Toshihiko Okabe on drums. It was released on April 20, 2000, as an 8 cm CD included with Taiji's autobiography, Uchuu o Kakeru Tomo e: Densetsu no Bando X no Sei to Shi.

== Background and recording ==
Taiji entered Tad Pole Studio in Setagaya to compose and work on songs for X Japan's album Jealousy (1991). As Yoshiki was busy writing lyrics, Toshihiko Okabe was recruited to play drums. Taiji was playing a song by tapping, a technique he had learned by watching Akira Takasaki, when guitarist Hide asked him to teach it to him. The bassist described this as unusual because Hide did not like tapping. The two fleshed it out into a song, a process Taiji described as being like playing catch.

Toshi called the song "amazing", but Taiji could not decide whether it was good or not because it felt like an étude. He considered it for the album, but ultimately felt it did not fit X Japan. Taiji said he and Hide came up with the title "Jungle".

== Track listing ==
Composed and arranged by Taiji.

1. "Jungle" - 05:49

== Personnel ==
- Taiji – bass
- Hide – guitar
- Toshihiko Okabe – drums
