= Week End (X Japan song) =

Single by X

from the album Blue Blood
- Released: April 21, 1990
- Recorded: February 4, 1990 at Nippon Budokan (track 2)
- Genre: Heavy metal, power metal
- Length: 12:44
- Label: CBS/Sony
- Songwriter: Yoshiki
- Producer: X

X singles chronology
"Endless Rain" (1989)	"Week End" (1990)	"Silent Jealousy" (1991)

"Week End" is a single released by X Japan (then named X) on April 21, 1990. It reached number two on the Oricon Singles Chart and has sold over 400,000 copies.

== Summary ==
This single version of "Week End" is a re-recording of the song that originally appeared on their 1989 album Blue Blood. It features a new arrangement containing strings performed by a 30-piece orchestra and additional piano. The B-side is a live performance of "Endless Rain" recorded on February 4, 1990, at the Nippon Budokan. The limited edition of the single features a fold-out jacket.

A live performance of "Week End" was included as the B-side of their 1996 single "Crucify My Love".

== Music video ==
The music video for "Week End" was filmed in a studio near the Kawasaki interchange of the Tōmei Expressway, mainly on March 24 and 25, 1990, although performance scenes were filmed on a different day. In it, every member of X dies, with the exception of vocalist Toshi. Guitarist Hide destroys a room, smashing mirrors and other objects by swinging his guitar and furnishings, before dying while clutching his head. Guitarist Pata drinks alone and dies from alcohol poisoning while sitting at a bar. Bassist Taiji gets into an argument with a women and is shot dead. Drummer Yoshiki commits suicide by cutting his wrist while laying on a bed, but is also seen stumbling around and then floating in a pool of blood. Inter-cut throughout, are shots of each member performing, including Toshi, who sings while blood is splattered on the white wall behind him. The video ends with the band sitting in a darkened room, watching the film via a projector. Hide, Pata, Taiji and Toshi filmed their non-performance scenes on March 24, with shooting going over-schedule and ending after 2 am, while the second day was dedicated entirely to Yoshiki's scenes, where filming went late into the night as he made numerous mistakes.

== Commercial performance ==
The song reached number two on the Oricon Singles Chart, and charted for 16 weeks. In May 1990, it was certified Gold by the RIAJ for sales of 200,000 copies. This number doubled in two years, when it was certified Platinum for sales of 400,000 in April 1992.

== Track listing ==
All tracks are written by Yoshiki and arranged by X.

No.	Title	Length
1.	"Week End" (New Arrange Version)	5:45
2.	"Endless Rain" (Live Version)	6:57

== Personnel ==
X

- Toshi – vocals
- Pata – guitar
- Hide – guitar
- Taiji – bass
- Yoshiki – drums, piano

Other

- Co-producer – Naoshi Tsuda
- Recorder and mixer – Motonari Matsumoto
  - Track 2 recorded by Satoshi Takahashi and Takashi Itoh
- Mastering engineer – Mitsukazu Tanaka
- Orchestra arranger and conductor – Takeshi "Neko" Saitoh
- Concertmaster – Great Eida
- Art direction and design – Hiroshi Ooki and Yasushi Saito
- Photo – Hiroshi Matsuda
