= Silent Jealousy =

Single by X

from the album Jealousy
- Released: September 11, 1991
- Genre: Symphonic metal; power metal; speed metal
- Length: 13:24
- Label: Sony
- Songwriter: Yoshiki
- Producer: X

X singles chronology
"Week End" (1990)	"Silent Jealousy" (1991)	"Standing Sex" (1991)

Music video
- "Silent Jealousy" on YouTube

"Silent Jealousy" is a single released by X Japan (then named X) on September 11, 1991.

== Summary ==
The song's structure is comparable to "Kurenai", opening with a calm intro, performed on a single instrument, followed by a speed metal composition with symphonic elements. It also includes a short excerpt of Tchaikovsky's "Swan Lake" during the piano-driven bridge. (Note: Yoshiki often performs "Swan Lake" on piano solo.) Yoshiki described the song as very fast and very hard to play, and said that while people may call the guitar riff heavy metal, he thinks of it as punk. On its composition he explained, "I really love punk rock, and I wanted to have it as punk as possible, but as melodious as possible. Which is very contradictory. Punk rock never really sees the orchestra, but I tried to combine those two aims."

The single's B-side is an alternate version of "Sadistic Desire", originally featured on the band's debut album Vanishing Vision.

Live recordings of "Silent Jealousy" can be found on the "Say Anything" single and various releases featuring the band's Tokyo Dome performance on January 7, 1992, as part of the three-day concert series On the Verge of Destruction.

On November 21, 1993, SME Records released X² (ダブルエックス, Daburu Ekkusu; lit. "Double-X"), a short film based on the manga series X by Clamp and set to X Japan's music. It features a slideshow of the manga's artwork set to a medley of X Japan's "Silent Jealousy", "Kurenai" and "Endless Rain" and a music video for the song "X" directed by Shigeyuki Hayashi.

Australian metal band Lord covered the title song as a bonus track on the Japanese version of their 2007 album Ascendence, with vocals performed by Hideaki Niwa. Finnish power metal band Sonata Arctica also covered part of the song during one of the concerts on their Japanese tour and according to Tony Kakko, the song is "absolutely splendid" but some parts are "hyperfast" and wouldn't suit Sonata Arctica's current stylings too well. It also served as wrestler Chris Jericho's one night entrance song for his return to Japan.

== Commercial performance ==
The song reached number 3 on the Oricon charts, and charted for 18 weeks. In 1991, with 234,950 copies sold was the 58th best-selling single of the year, being certified Gold by RIAJ.

== Track listing ==
All lyrics are written by Yoshiki and all tracks are arranged by X.

No.	Title	Music	Length
1.	"Silent Jealousy"	Yoshiki	7:19
2.	"Sadistic Desire"	hide	6:05

== Personnel ==
X

- Toshi – vocals
- Pata – guitar
- Hide – guitar
- Taiji – bass
- Yoshiki – drums, piano

Other

- Co-producer – Naoshi Tsuda
- Mixer – Rich Breen
- Art direction and design – Mitsuo Izumisawa
- Cover photo – Michihiro Ikeda
