= Endless Rain =

Single by X

from the album Blue Blood
- Released: December 1, 1989
- Recorded: June 10, 1989 at Hibiya Yagai Ongaku (track 2)
- Genre: Symphonic metal
- Length: 16:25
- Label: CBS/Sony
- Songwriter: Yoshiki
- Producer: X

X singles chronology
"Kurenai" (1989)	"Endless Rain" (1989)	"Week End" (1990)

Music video
- "Endless Rain" on YouTube

"Endless Rain" is the fourth single released by Japanese heavy metal band X Japan (then named X) on December 1, 1989. It reached number three on the Oricon Singles Chart and has sold over 400,000 copies.

== Summary ==
The title track is taken from the group's breakthrough album Blue Blood, and is their first ballad released as a single. The B-side is a live version of the song "X", recorded on June 10, 1989 at Hibiya Yagai Ongaku. The limited edition of the single, limited to 100,000 copies, features a fold-out jacket.

Yoshiki said that "Endless Rain" is the first ballad he ever wrote, previously he was only writing heavy music and thrash metal. He explained that after members of Sony saw him play a composition by Pyotr Ilyich Tchaikovsky on piano while X was waiting to play at a club, they asked him to write a ballad. The resulting song was "Endless Rain". Yoshiki said the song became a hit and was a shock to their fans, but they eventually came to like it and it became "X Japan's theme song."

Rolling Stone referred to the song as "November Rain, minus the bullshit" and called it X's first big chart hit.

A live performance of "Endless Rain" was included as the B-side to their 1990 single "Week End"'.

== Music videos ==
Two music videos have been created for "Endless Rain". The first was included on the Shigeki! Visual Shock Vol. 2 home video in 1989.

The second was released on the X Japan Showcase in L.A. Premium Prototype DVD on September 6, 2010. Directed by Russell Thomas and featuring the band performing live on top of the Kodak Theatre in Hollywood, California in January 2010, it has the sound of the audience added to the audio.

On November 21, 1993, SME Records released X² (ダブルエックス, Daburu Ekkusu; lit. "Double-X"), a short film based on the manga series X by Clamp and set to X Japan's music. It features a slideshow of the manga's artwork set to a medley of X Japan's "Silent Jealousy", "Kurenai" and "Endless Rain" and a music video for the song "X" directed by Shigeyuki Hayashi.

== Commercial performance ==
The single reached number three on the Oricon Singles Chart, and charted for 31 week. In March 1990, it was certified Gold by the RIAJ for sales of 200,000 copies. This number doubled in two years, when it was certified Platinum for sales of 400,000 in February 1992.

== Legacy and cover versions ==
"Endless Rain" was used as the theme song of Kaizo Hayashi's 1990 film Zipang.

In South Korea, Japanese popular culture was banned in 1990s. However, at the time, "Endless Rain" became a hit song on the gilboard charts (streetboard charts) by street vendors, and large numbers of Korean people knew the song, as the vendors persistently played it from their boomboxes.

During Guns N' Roses' July 2007 Japanese concerts, Richard Fortus and Robin Finck performed part of "Endless Rain" during their guitar duets. "Endless Rain" was covered by Japanese singers Angela Aki, at one of her concerts, and Ayumi Nakamura, on her 2008 album Voice, and by Hong Kong singer Aaron Kwok at one of his concerts.

In December 2020, Yoshiki performed the song at the 71st NHK Kōhaku Uta Gassen of New Year's Eve, along with Babymetal, Roger Taylor and Brian May of Queen, Sarah Brightman, SixTones, LiSA, and Milet.

On November 28, 2023, Yoshiki performed "Endless Rain" at the 2023 MAMA Awards in Japan along with Huening Kai and Taehyun of Tomorrow X Together, Jaehyun of BoyNextDoor, Anton of Riize, Han Yu-jin of Zerobaseone. On April 16, 2024, Yoshiki performed "Endless Rain" along with "The Star-Spangled Banner at Dodger Stadium on Hello Kitty Night.

== Track listing ==
All tracks are written by Yoshiki, except track 2, lyrics by Hitomi Shiratori. All tracks arranged by X.

No.	Title	Length
1.	"Endless Rain"	6:35
2.	"X" (Live Version)	9:40
Total length:		16:15

== Personnel ==
X

- Toshi – vocals
- Pata – guitar
- Hide – guitar
- Taiji – bass
- Yoshiki – drums, piano

Other

- Co-producer – Naoshi Tsuda
- Mixing engineer – Motonari Matsumoto
- Design – Hiroshi Ooki
- Photos – Masanori Katoh, Yasha, Takeo Ogiso
