= Blue Blood (X Japan album) =

1989 studio album by X Japan

Studio album by X
- Released: April 21, 1989
- Recorded: January 6–March 12, 1989 at CBS Sony Roppongi Studio, CBS Sony Shinanomachi Studio, Sound City Studio
- Genres: Heavy metal; speed metal; symphonic power metal
- Length: 65:18
- Languages: English; Japanese
- Label: CBS/Sony
- Producer: X

X chronology
Vanishing Vision (1988)	Blue Blood (1989)	Jealousy (1991)

Singles from Blue Blood
- 1. "Kurenai" Released: September 1, 1989; 2. "Endless Rain" Released: December 1, 1989; 3. "Week End" Released: April 21, 1990

Blue Blood is the second studio album by Japanese heavy metal band X Japan, then known as simply X. It was released on April 21, 1989, by CBS/Sony as the band's major label debut. Blue Blood sold more than 700,000 copies, reached number 6 on the Oricon chart and stayed on the chart for more than 100 weeks. The album's singles would also reach the top five on the chart. In 2007, Rolling Stone Japan ranked Blue Blood number 15 on their list of the "100 Greatest Japanese Rock Albums of All Time". In 2018, readers and professional musicians voted it the best album in the history of hard rock and heavy metal in We Rock magazine's "Metal General Election".

== Overview ==
On December 26, 1987, X participated in an audition held by CBS/Sony. But in the meantime, the band released their first album, Vanishing Vision, through drummer Yoshiki's own Extasy Records, on April 14, 1988, and toured extensively in support of the record. They signed with CBS/Sony at the end of July, and announced they would be making their major label debut during a concert at Club Citta on October 30.

Having held songwriting camps in August and September of 1988, X recorded Blue Blood from January 6 to March 1989. It was released on April 21, 1989, during the band's Blue Blood Tour, which began on March 13. Two of the concerts sold out in advance; the March 16 show at Shibuya Public Hall, which was later released on home video as Blue Blood Tour Bakuhatsu Sunzen Gig, sold out in two hours, while the April 25 show at Osaka Kōsei Nenkin Kaikan sold out in thirty minutes. The summer saw X expand their reach to non-hard rock audiences by performing at several festivals, such as Pop Rockets, Pop Hill and Rock'n Roll Olympic. They then began the Rose & Blood Tour in September, which was temporarily suspended when Yoshiki collapsed after a November 22 concert, but then continued into May 1990. Their success earned the band Best New Artist at the Japan Cable Awards and the All-Japan Cable Broadcasting Awards (both in 1989) and the "Grand Prix New Artist of the Year" award at the 4th annual Japan Gold Disc Awards in 1990.

A special edition of Blue Blood, which includes a second disc of instrumental versions of some songs, was released on February 14, 2007, and reached number 23 on the Oricon chart. A remastered version which reached number 165 was released on March 19, 2008.

=== Composition ===
Blue Blood contains re-recordings of their second single "Orgasm" and its B-side "X", as well as "Kurenai" and "Unfinished" from their debut album Vanishing Vision, all with alternate/expanded lyrics. "Easy Fight Rambling" is a glam metal song, while "Kurenai" exemplifies the band's trademark mix of speed metal, ballad and symphonic elements. The intro track "Prologue (~ World Anthem)" is a re-working of the 1977 Mahogany Rush song "The World Anthem" originally written by Frank Marino, hence its title and Marino being credited as composer.

Blue Blood leans more towards symphonic metal than its predecessor, with "Rose of Pain" including portions from Johann Sebastian Bach's "Fugue in G Minor". "Endless Rain", a power ballad, also features classical piano and strings in the background.

The songs "X" and "Orgasm" have many of X's friends, fellow musicians and members of bands on Extasy Records providing backing vocals, namely Baki from Gastunk, Tusk, Ken and Seiichi from Zi:Kill, Haruhiko Ash (The Zolge, Eve of Destiny), and members of Ladies Room.

=== Release ===
The album was released on April 21, 1989, by major label CBS/Sony. In the initial counting week of May it reached number six on the Oricon chart, with sales of 28,160 copies. By the end of the year it had sold 188,940 copies, was the 63rd best-selling album of the year, and in 1990 with 378,910 copies, was the 28th best-selling album. In December 1989, it was certified gold by RIAJ. As it charted for 108 weeks, in 2007 Oricon counted 712,000 sold copies. Originally released simultaneously on double LP and single CD (with different track orders), a remastered edition was released on February 14, 2007, and included a bonus CD with instrumental versions of some songs. This edition reached number twenty-three on the chart.

All of the singles were certified Gold, meaning at least two hundred thousand copies sold, by the RIAJ. "Kurenai" became the band's first single to reach the top five on the charts. The song reached number five on the second counting week of September 1989, with sales of 20,930 copies. It charted for 39 weeks, the longest of any other band's singles. In 1989, with sales of 133,090 copies, it was the 74th best-selling single of the year, and in 1990, with 176,450 copies was the 67th best-selling single.

The second single, the ballad "Endless Rain" became X's first to reach the top three on the charts. It reached number three on the second counting week of December 1989, with sales of 40,690 copies. It is the second longest charting single with 31 weeks. In 1990, with 357,680 copies sold was the 21st best-selling single of the year.

The third single, "Week End", became the band's first to reach the top two on the charts. It reached number two in the fifth counting week of April 1990, with sales of 85,060 copies. In the upcoming weeks, it was at number three and five respectively, with sales of 51,490, and 39,590 copies. In 1990, with 291,440 copies sold, it was the 32nd best-selling single of the year.

== Reception ==
Professional ratings
Review scores
Source	Rating
Allmusic	3.5/5 stars
RockGarage	8.5/10

Music writer Takuya Ito called Blue Blood a historic work that "revolutionized the history of Japanese rock and ultimately shook the world." He found it astonishing that, even though the music is so intense, the album also possesses broad appeal and features melodies and an atmosphere that only Japanese artists could create.

Kazuaki Nakatsuka of Re:minder wrote that the album's music traverses a spectrum so vast that it is hard to believe the songs were created by the same band. He cited "Rose of Pain" as his favorite track on the record and described it as condensing the musical elements inherent to X; "Rooted in classic heavy metal and thrash, the music boldly incorporates symphonic arrangements, with magnificent interplay between twin lead guitars and Yoshiki's piano." Nakatsuka called "Blue Blood", with its driving force of Yoshiki's double-bass drumming, beautiful twin-lead guitar harmonies by Hide and Pata, and an unmistakably "Japanese sensibility" via its lyrical melody, a "knockout" track worthy of its status as the album's title song. He described "Easy Fight Rambling" and its Van Halen-esque shuffle beat as tailor-made for live performances, the instrumental "Xclamation" as fusing elements of world music with the slap-bass virtuosity of Taiji, "Orgasm" as a "ferocious" thrash metal song that show's the band's unbridled aggression even after signing to a major label, and credited "Week End" and its catchy melody and powerful hook with broadening the band's appeal for the average Japanese rock fan.

Carl Begai wrote that "Blue Blood is and will remain one of the few damn near perfect albums in my eyes for the simple fact it never lets up and never gets lazy, even when things slow down for a cheeseball ballad or two." He cited "Blue Blood", "X" and "Orgasm" as his favorite songs and compared them to Walls of Jericho-era Helloween, and expressed admiration for the "audacity" of putting them side-by-side with "melodic rock fare like 'Week End', 'Easy Fight Rambling' and 'Celebration' or a sappy ballad like 'Endless Rain'." He called the latter move unheard of by Western metal standards. He also called "Kurenai" one of his top three metal songs of all time and Pata and Hide two of the most underrated/undiscovered guitarists around.

Alexey Eremenko of Allmusic described Blue Blood as largely "staying on the coordinate grid set by Iron Maiden, Guns N' Roses, Queensrÿche and perhaps updated Thin Lizzy, with the results being not too far from what Helloween were doing at the time" by combining "menacing guitar work with anthemic... cinematic... melodies". Giving the album a three and a half out of five stars rating, he concluded that it "generally packs enough skill and enthusiasm to deliver the goods on par with its best genre associates, even if clearly following in their footsteps."

Rolling Stone referred to "Endless Rain" as "November Rain, minus the bullshit."

== Legacy ==
On their 2007 list of the "100 Greatest Japanese Rock Albums of All Time", Rolling Stone Japan ranked Blue Blood number 15. It was named one of the top albums from 1989–1998 in a 2004 issue of the music magazine Band Yarouze. In 2018, readers and professional musicians voted Blue Blood the best album in the history of hard rock and heavy metal in We Rock magazine's "Metal General Election". In 2021, Kerrang! included it on a list of 13 essential Japanese rock and metal albums.

The term visual kei was derived from the slogan "Psychedelic Violence Crime of Visual Shock" seen on cover of the album and used to describe the music scene which X Japan pioneered.

Several songs from the record remain mainstays in X Japan's live sets. Such as "Kurenai", which is one of their signature songs, being played at most of their concerts, often accompanied by the stage being lit in red light (Kurenai translates as "crimson") and the band pausing during the last third in order to let the audience sing the chorus on their own. Other popular songs from the album are "X", "Endless Rain", and "Week End".

"Celebration" was covered by I.N.A., Pata and Heath, with vocals by hide, on the 1999 hide tribute album Tribute Spirits. hide also performed the song live during some of his solo concerts, and a studio version was completed after his death and put on the 2002 Singles ~ Junk Story compilation. Argentinian metal band Auvernia covered "Blue Blood" on their 2008 album Towards Eternity. "Kurenai" was covered by Matenrou Opera for Crush! -90's V-Rock Best Hit Cover Songs-, a compilation album released on January 26, 2011 that features current visual kei bands covering songs from bands that were important to the '90s visual kei movement. Inzargi, vocalist of Megamasso, covered "X" for his 2012 cover album.

== Track listing ==
=== Double LP release ===
Side A
No.	Title	Lyrics	Music	Length
1.	"Prologue (~ World Anthem)"	Yoshiki	Frank Marino	2:38
2.	"Blue Blood"	Yoshiki	Yoshiki	5:03
3.	"Week End"	Yoshiki	Yoshiki	6:02
4.	"Easy Fight Rambling"	Toshi, Hitomi Shiratori	X	4:43
5.	"X"	Hitomi Shiratori	Yoshiki	6:00

Side B
No.	Title	Lyrics	Music	Length
1.	"Xclamation"		hide, Taiji (Note: In the lyrics sheet insert included with the LP, track one on Side B, "Xclamation", is separated into "Xclamation #1" and "Xclamation #2". #1 is credited as music and arrangement: hide, while #2 is credited as music: hide and Taiji, arrangement: X. Everywhere else on the record it is written as; "Xclamation" music: hide and Taiji, arrangement: X.)	3:52
2.	"Orgasm" (オルガスム)	Hitomi Shiratori	Yoshiki	2:42
3.	"Celebration"	hide	hide	4:51
4.	"Endless Rain"	Yoshiki	Yoshiki	6:30

Side C
No.	Title	Lyrics	Music	Length
1.	"Kurenai" (紅)	Yoshiki	Yoshiki	6:09
2.	"Rose of Pain"	Yoshiki	Yoshiki	11:47
3.	"Unfinished"	Yoshiki	Yoshiki	4:24

=== CD release ===
No.	Title	Length
1.	"Prologue (~ World Anthem)"	2:38
2.	"Blue Blood"	5:03
3.	"Week End"	6:02
4.	"Easy Fight Rambling"	4:43
5.	"X"	6:00
6.	"Endless Rain"	6:30
7.	"Kurenai" (紅)	6:09
8.	"Xclamation"	3:52
9.	"Orgasm" (オルガスム)	2:42
10.	"Celebration"	4:51
11.	"Rose of Pain"	11:47
12.	"Unfinished"	4:24

Disc 2 2007 Special edition bonus disc
No.	Title	Length
1.	"Blue Blood (Instrumental)"	5:04
2.	"Week End (Instrumental)"	6:05
3.	"X (Instrumental)"	6:02
4.	"Endless Rain (Instrumental)"	6:37
5.	"Kurenai (Instrumental)"	6:60
6.	"Celebration (Instrumental)"	4:52
7.	"Rose of Pain (Instrumental)"	11:50
8.	"Unfinished (Instrumental)"	4:28

== Personnel ==
X

- Yoshiki – drums, piano
- Toshi – vocals
- Pata – guitar
- hide – guitar
- Taiji – bass guitar

Additional performers

- Chorus on "X": Baki (Gastunk), Haruhiko (Zolge), Act Ishi (God), Ei-chan (Poison Arts), Butaman (Tetsu-Arai), Hara & Seiji (EX-ANS), Harry, Minami & Yuji (Sighs of Love Potion), George, Ken, Jun & Sanpei (Ladies Room)
- Chorus on "Orgasm": Baki (Gastunk), Butaman (Tetsu-Arai), Ishiya & Chelsea (Death Side), Montes (Squad), Windy (Crime Hate), Gazelle (Asylum), Hara & Seiji (EX-ANS), George, Ken, Jun & Sanpei (Ladies Room), Tusk, Ken & Seiichi (G-Kill), Koji Yoshida (Band-Yaroze), Mr. Hosoi (Rockin'f), Satoshi, Itoh & Kudo (3rd), Mr. Abe & Okubo (Engineers)
- Concertmaster: Great Eida
- Conductor, Arranger: Takeshi "Neko" Saitoh

Production

- Producer: X
- Co-producer, Director: Naoshi Tsuda
- Executive producer: Yoshikatsu Inoue
- Assistant engineer: Akiko Nakamura, Naoki Yamada, Shigeki Kashii, Takashi Ohkubo
- Recorded by: Mitsuyasu Abe, Tetsuhiro Miyajima
- Percussion on "Xclamation #1" recorded by: Noritaka Ubukata in Bombay, India
- Mixed: Motonari Matsumoto
- Mixed, Recorded: Gremlin
- Digital Mastering: Mitsukazu "Quincy" Tanaka
- Creative director: Shigeo Gotoh
- Art direction, Design: Masayoshi Nakajo
- Design (inner-card): Takashi Miyagawa
- Photographer: Peter Calvin
