= I'll Kill You =

- Cover of the 1985 single

Single by X
- Released: June 1985
- Studio: Sound Market
- Genre: Speed metal
- Length: 7:34
- Label: Dada
- Songwriter: Yoshiki Hayashi
- Producers: X and Nobukatsu Hayashi

X singles chronology
"I'll Kill You" (1985)	"Orgasm" (1986)

"I'll Kill You" is a song by Japanese heavy metal band X, written by Yoshiki Hayashi. It is the first song Yoshiki wrote after forming the band in 1982 and has been recorded by them several times, the first of which was distributed as a demo cassette tape in February 1985. Later that year, it was recorded again and released as the band's first 7-inch single in June 1985 by Dada Records. The song was later recorded for X's first album, Vanishing Vision (1988).

== Overview ==
"I'll Kill You" is the first song that drummer and bandleader Yoshiki wrote for X after forming the band in 1982 with vocalist Toshi in order to play heavier music with two lead guitarists. He first wrote the lyrics in Japanese before translating them into English, asking the smartest students in his high school to help with any difficult parts. According to his biographer, Narumi Komatsu, after reading the lyrics over, Yoshiki realized they were directed at himself.

"I'll Kill You" was first recorded by X in February 1985 as part of a three-track demo cassette tape. The tape was handed out by the band to earn bookings at live venues in Tokyo. After a few months of performing concerts, X was contacted by the independent record label Dada Records about releasing a record. "I'll Kill You" was recorded again and released as a 7-inch single in June 1985. All 1,000 copies of the record sold out in a few days. The cover art notoriously features numerous photographs of dead bodies taken during the Vietnam War.

"I'll Kill You" was recorded a third time for inclusion on the band's first album, Vanishing Vision (1988). Yoshiki said they decided to record this version because the previous one was of poor recording quality and the song itself unfinished at the time. He noted the album version has a faster tempo and said the previous one lacked a guitar riff. Discussing the 1988 version, Yoshiki claimed that the song is not about literally killing someone, but is a love song in the vein of a jealous lover.

A different recording of the 1985 single's B-side, "Break the Darkness", was included on the sampler Heavy Metal Force III in November 1985.

== Reception ==
Kazuaki Nakatsuka of Re:minder described "I'll Kill You" as a metal track infused with punk sensibilities, "driven by a straightforward, relentless onslaught of speed."

"I'll Kill You" was covered by French symphonic black metal band Anorexia Nervosa as a bonus track for the Japanese edition of their 2004 album Redemption Process and later included on their 2005 The September E.P. as well. It was covered by Volcano for their 2018 cover album Irregular.

== Track listing ==
Side A
No.	Title	Writer(s)	Length
1.	"I'll Kill You"	Yoshiki Hayashi	3:21

Side B
No.	Title	Writer(s)	Length
1.	"Break the Darkness"	Yoshiki Hayashi	4:13

== Personnel ==
According to the 1985 single by Dada Records:

X

- Toshimitsu "Toshi" Deyama – vocals
- Yoshiki Hayashi – drums
- Atsushi Tokuo – bass guitar
- Yuji "Terry" Izumisawa – guitar
- Tomoyuki "Tomo" Ogata – guitar

Production staff

- Photo – Kazuyoshi Mori
- Design – Atsushi Tokuo
- Engineer – Mr. Ohzeki
- Sleeve Design – Nobukatsu Hayashi
