= Orgasm (song) =

- Clockwise from top-left: Toshi, Hikaru, Jun, Yoshiki

Single by X
- Released: April 10, 1986
- Recorded: March 1986 at Mod Studio
- Genre: Speed metal
- Length: 2:21
- Label: Extasy
- Songwriter: Yoshiki
- Producer: X

X singles chronology
| "I'll Kill You" (1985) | "Orgasm" (1986) | "Kurenai" (1989) |

"Orgasm" (Japanese: オルガスム, Hepburn: Orugasumu) is the second single by Japanese heavy metal band X Japan, then named X, released on April 10, 1986.

== Background and release ==
"Orgasm" was the first release by drummer Yoshiki's own record label Extasy Records. Unusually, the band's name, X, is written on the cover in Japanese as エックス. All 1,500 copies sold out, and in his biography Yoshiki says an additional pressing of 2,500 copies was scheduled, but was cancelled as guitarist Jun and bassist Hikaru had left the band.

The song is notoriously known for the obvious sexual themes presented within the lyrics. Of particular notice is the fact that the track begins with heavy panting and ends with explosions, seemingly to emulate sexual climax. The title track as well as the self-titled "X" would later be re-recorded for the band's 1989 second album Blue Blood. While Yoshiki is credited with the lyrics and music for both these songs on the single, the Blue Blood recordings credit his alias "Hitomi Shiratori" for their lyrics instead.

== Reception ==
Kazuaki Nakatsuka of Re:minder wrote that the band's musicianship on the "Orgasm" single's three songs is a significant improvement from that of their first single, "I'll Kill You", but noted the recording quality and overall atmosphere still retain the "underground" feel. He cited the song "X" as the highlight, calling it groundbreaking for layering a straightforward, sentimental melody—reminiscent of traditional Japanese pop songs—over a speed metal backing track. He noted that heavy metal publications of the time negatively dismissed the song as "speed kayōkyoku". Nakatsuka also wrote that the release's artwork sees the blueprint for the band's iconic visual aesthetic begin to take shape, starting to evolve from the 44Magnum-derived blonde hair, leather and studs, to white face paint, heavy eye makeup and spiked hair.

== Legacy ==
Released several months after Helloween's debut album Walls of Jericho, Nakatsuka credited X and the song "X" with pioneering the "melodic speed metal" genre alongside the German band. "X" became a signature song of X Japan, being performed at nearly all of their concerts. Numerous times during a pause in a performance of the track a band member, usually vocalist Toshi, will yell "We are..." and the audience responds with "X!" before the musicians start the last leg of the song. This was used as the title to the 2016 documentary film about the group, We Are X.

On November 21, 1993, SME Records released X² (ダブルエックス, Daburu Ekkusu; lit. "Double-X"), a short film based on the manga series X by Clamp and set to X Japan's music. It features a slideshow of the manga's artwork set to a medley of X Japan's "Silent Jealousy", "Kurenai" and "Endless Rain" and a music video for the song "X" directed by Shigeyuki Hayashi.

Inzargi, vocalist of Megamasso, covered "X" for his 2012 cover album.

== Track listing ==
Side A
| No. | Title | Lyrics | Music | Length |
|---|---|---|---|---|
| 1. | "Orgasm" (オルガスム) | Yoshiki | Yoshiki | 3:02 |
| 2. | "Time Trip Loving" | Toshi | Jun | 3:44 |

Side B
| No. | Title | Lyrics | Music | Length |
|---|---|---|---|---|
| 3. | "X" | Yoshiki | Yoshiki | 5:37 |

== Personnel ==
- Toshi – vocals
- Yoshiki – drums
- Jun – guitar
- Hikaru – bass guitar
- Engineer – Hiroshi Kuramochi
- Photo – Yuka Momats, Hide Igarashi

Personnel per "Orgasm" liner notes.
