= Vanishing Vision =

1988 studio album by X Japan

Studio album by X
- Released: April 14, 1988
- Recorded: 1987–1988 at Echo House, Magnet Studio
- Genres: Thrash metal; speed metal; power metal
- Length: 42:03
- Languages: English; Japanese
- Label: Extasy
- Producer: X

X chronology
| Vanishing Vision (1988) | Blue Blood (1989) |

Vanishing Vision is the debut studio album by Japanese heavy metal band X Japan, then known as simply X. It was released on April 14, 1988 by Extasy Records, topped the Oricon indies chart and reached number 19 on the main chart. In 2018, Vanishing Vision was voted the seventh best album in the history of hard rock and heavy metal in We Rock magazine's "Metal General Election".

== Overview ==
Vanishing Vision was released on vinyl record on April 14, 1988, on drummer Yoshiki's own label Extasy Records. The band toured extensively in support of the record, beginning with Vanishing Tour '88 Spring throughout March and into early April. Vanishing Tour Vol.2 took them to 20 locations for 24 shows from June to July, while the Burn Out Tour '88 Oct. had 12 performances throughout October. A September 4 show at Kyoto Sports Valley, is a popular bootleg recording of the tour.

To commemorate Vanishing Vision selling twenty thousand copies, the album was given a limited pressing of five thousand picture discs in late October 1988. It includes a separate flexi disc of "Stab Me in the Back", recorded live at the Kyoto Sports Valley concert. This version was later included on the 1999 Perfect Best compilation. A studio version of the song was previously included on the February 1987 Victor Records sampler Skull Thrash Zone Volume I, which was recorded with Pata as a support guitar player, and is different from the one that would later appear on their third album Jealousy in 1991.

Vanishing Vision was released on CD on October 15, 1989. The first press included a photobook, while the version sold by Extasy's mail-order service included a sticker designed by guitarist Hide. This was after the release of the band's second album Blue Blood on the major label CBS/Sony. In 1990, with 158,220 copies sold Vanishing Vision was the 78th best-selling album of the year, and stayed on the charts for 47 weeks. By 1997, it had sold over 800,000 copies. A digitally remastered CD version was released on September 13, 2000, by Warner Music Japan.

=== Composition and analysis ===
The album's title, Vanishing Vision, was chosen to mean the band was shedding the shameless image they had acquired for a fresh start. Its cover art drawn by Shiro Nishiguchi was inspired by the track "Sadistic Desire", with input from each band member.

Yoshiki said that "Vanishing Love," which has roughly half Japanese and half English lyrics, represents human weakness. The other members pointed out that despite being a fast song, the twin guitars and melody are more important. "Phantom of Guilt" has a 16-beat rhythm with lyrics, according to Toshi, about conflict within the human spirit. "Sadistic Desire" is a song from Hide's previous band Saver Tiger, originally called "Sadistic Emotion." Yoshiki rewrote the lyrics to be about violent sex, inspired by the 1986 film Blue Velvet. Unusually, Taiji played the bass with his fingers for the track and it contains something of a bass solo. An alternate version of the song would later appear on X's 1991 single "Silent Jealousy".

Taiji wrote the 16-beat rhythm, slap bass song "Give Me the Pleasure" after watching a news report on a murder. The piece is unusual for X in that it uses minor seventh chords and has an ethnic drum beat that also used instruments such as the timbales and cow bell. "I'll Kill You" is a reworked version of their 1985 debut single, with a sped up tempo and the addition of a guitar riff. Yoshiki explained that the song is not about literally killing someone, but is a love song in the vein of a jealous lover. Yoshiki said "Alive" is a life-affirming song, with lyrics about being pushed to the brink of death in a dream, only to wake up bleeding. The intro contains an excerpt of the first movement of Ludwig van Beethoven's Moonlight Sonata. Hide stated that the guitar solos in this song contrast with the others on the album because they are more melodic; "a crying guitar."

The lyrics for this version of "Kurenai" are entirely in English, but it would later appear mostly in Japanese on Blue Blood and be released as their major debut single, becoming one of their signature songs. While seemingly a love song, Yoshiki stated that "Kurenai" is also about the struggle of one's heart. Hide revealed that it was his favorite X song before he joined the band and was disappointed that they did not perform it when he did, so he had to nag to get them to play it. Both Toshi and Taiji felt that it has a very Japanese feel to it, with Taiji stressing that each member helped arrange it. Just as its title suggests, "Un-finished..." is a short incomplete ballad that suddenly cuts off. Yoshiki came up with the song after the album was completed, feeling it needed an ending theme, and said that, despite being reminiscent of Chicago, it does not feel out of place at all. It would also later be reworked and "finished" for the band's second album.

== Reception ==
Despite being released by an independent record label, Vanishing Vision sold more than ten thousand copies and topped Oricon's indie music chart. It also reached number 19 on the main Oricon Albums Chart, making X the first indie band to enter the main chart. In 2018, readers and professional musicians voted Vanishing Vision the seventh best album in the history of hard rock and heavy metal in We Rock magazine's "Metal General Election".

In the June 1988 issue of Rockin'f magazine, Hirotake Kawamoto briefly wrote that on the album X created a world of aesthetically beautiful thrash metal with an emphasis on melody lines.

Kazuaki Nakatsuka of Re:minder described Vanishing Vision as featuring a diverse array of tracks, such as the piano-ballad "Alive", which draws on Yoshiki's classical background, "Sadistic Desire", which captures Hide's unique flair, and the instrumental "Give Me the Pleasure", which highlights Taiji's slap bass playing. He called "Kurenai", with its distinctly Japanese lyrical melody, a "timeless masterpiece" that stands as a quintessential example of the melodic speed metal genre, and expressed astonishment that X had already fully established their signature sound by the time of their first album. Nakatsuka also noted that although Vanishing Vision received consistently lukewarm reviews in heavy metal publications of the time and was occasionally criticized for songs resembling the work of Helloween, fans supported the album on a level not typically seen in the independent music scene and explained that X were the German band's contemporaries in defining melodic speed metal.

Music writer Takuya Ito called Vanishing Vision the X album with the most spirit and sheer, unstoppable momentum and wrote that its intense sound, though raw, "sublimates the aggression and madness of German metal, thrash, and hardcore to create a form of extreme art." He described the album as featuring both beautiful and intense guitar interplay, spectacular basslines, thunderous drums, and vocals that range from piercing screams to beautiful singing that moves the heart. Ito also noted that the ballad "Alive" fuses elements of classical music.

== Track listing ==
All tracks are written by Yoshiki, except where noted.

Side A
| No. | Title | Lyrics | Music | Length |
|---|---|---|---|---|
| 1. | "Dear Loser" | instrumental | Taiji | 2:27 |
| 2. | "Vanishing Love" | | | 6:01 |
| 3. | "Phantom of Guilt" | Toshi | Taiji | 5:18 |
| 4. | "Sadistic Desire" | | Hide | 6:09 |

Side B
| No. | Title | Music | Length |
|---|---|---|---|
| 1. | "Give Me the Pleasure" | Taiji, Hide | 2:57 |
| 2. | "I'll Kill You" | | 3:29 |
| 3. | "Alive" | | 8:24 |
| 4. | "Kurenai" | | 5:46 |
| 5. | "Un-finished..." | | 1:32 |

== Personnel ==
X

- Toshi – lead vocals
- Pata – guitar, backing vocals
- Hide – guitar, backing vocals
- Taiji – bass, backing vocals
- Yoshiki – drums, backing vocals, piano, keyboards

Production

- Kinya Maekawa – director
- Seiji Komura – director
- Masanori Chinzei – recording engineer, mixing engineer
- Hikaru Sawamura – mixing engineer
- Akinori Yoshino – assistant engineer
- Norio Kaziki – photography
- Shiro Nishiguchi – sleeve design
- Nobu – art direction & design (on CD only)
- Mitsukazu "Quincy" Tanaka – digital mastering engineer (on CD only)
