= Kurenai (song) =

Single by X

from the album Blue Blood
- B-side: "20th Century Boy (Live)"
- Released: September 1, 1989
- Recorded: June 10, 1989 at Hibiya Yaon (track 2)
- Genre: Power metal
- Length: 8:43
- Label: CBS/Sony
- Songwriter: Yoshiki
- Producers: X, Naoshi Tsuda

X singles chronology
"Orgasm" (1986)	"Kurenai" (1989)	"Endless Rain" (1989)

Audio sample
- "Kurenai": file; help

"Kurenai" (Japanese: 紅; lit. 'crimson') is a song by Japanese heavy metal band X, written by Yoshiki. One of the band's oldest songs, they have been performing "Kurenai" since 1985, and several versions have been released, most significantly as their major-label debut single on September 1, 1989. The single reached number five on the Oricon Singles Chart and has sold over 400,000 copies. It also earned the band Best New Artist at both the Japan Cable Awards and the All-Japan Cable Broadcasting Awards in 1989.

== Background and release ==
"Kurenai" was first released on X's June 1985 live demo tapes, which were titled "Live" and "Endless Dream". The lyrics are entirely in Japanese, while the next version, released on their April 1988 debut album Vanishing Vision, is entirely in English and begins with an intro played by Hide on guitar. A flexi disc included within the June 1988 issue of Rockin' f magazine, contains "Kurenai (Original Japanese Version)". It begins with an intro played by Yoshiki on piano and contrary to the title, was mostly in English. The version on 1989's Blue Blood begins with an orchestrated piece, then the guitar intro, and is mostly in Japanese, with only the opening lyrics in English. Only a few months later, the single version was released, although very similar to the recording on Blue Blood, it does not have the orchestrated intro.

While appearing to be a love song, Yoshiki stated that "Kurenai" is also about the struggle of one's heart. Hide revealed that it was his favorite X song before he joined the band and was disappointed that they did not perform it when he did, so he had to nag to get them to play it. Yoshiki commented that was probably because the song's arrangement at the time was too simple. Both Toshi and Taiji felt that the track has a very Japanese feel to it, with Taiji stressing that each member helped arrange the version that appears on their first album.

"Kurenai" is one of X Japan's signature songs. It is played at nearly all of their concerts, often accompanied by the stage being lit in red light and the band pausing during the last third in order to let the audience sing the chorus on their own. The single version features that specific bit of a live performance added after the studio recording, hence the title being written as "紅 Kurenai + Your Voice" on the back of the single's case. The B-side is a live recording of the song "20th Century Boy", originally by British rock band T. Rex. The live material from both songs was recorded on June 10, 1989 at Hibiya Yaon.

A new English-language version of "Kurenai" was reportedly recorded for X Japan's unreleased studio album, before it was decided to create entirely new material instead.

== Music videos ==
Two music videos for "Kurenai" have been created. The first was included on their independently released Xclamation VHS in 1987, before being included on DVD in the X Japan : Complete II box set in 2005. Making-of footage for what was advertised as a music video for "Kurenai" was included on the CBS/Sony produced VHS Thanx in 1989. However, this footage was used in a music video for the song "Xclamation" on the Shigeki! Visual Shock Vol. 2 home video later that year instead.

The second was directed by Nathan Fox and mainly shot as the band performed live on top of the Kodak Theatre in Hollywood, California in January 2010, it has the sound of the audience added to the audio.

== Reception ==
"Kurenai" reached number five on the Oricon Singles Chart, and charted for 39 weeks. In March 1990, it was certified Gold by the RIAJ for sales of 200,000 copies. This number doubled in two years, when it was certified Platinum for sales of 400,000 in April 1992.

"Kurenai" earned X the award for Best New Artist at both the Japan Cable Awards and the All-Japan Cable Broadcasting Awards in 1989.

== Track listing ==
No.	Title	Writer(s)	Arrangement	Length
1.	"Kurenai" (紅)	Yoshiki	X	5:49
2.	"20th Century Boy (Live)" (T.Rex cover)	Marc Bolan		2:54

== Legacy and cover versions ==
The Japanese TV program Music Station named "Kurenai" the "Most Intense" song of the Heisei period, and the fourth best "High Key Song" of the period.

On November 21, 1993, SME Records released X² (ダブルエックス, Daburu Ekkusu; lit. "Double-X"), a short film based on the manga series X by Clamp and set to X Japan's music. It features a slideshow of the manga's artwork set to a medley of X Japan's "Silent Jealousy", "Kurenai" and "Endless Rain" and a music video for the song "X" directed by Shigeyuki Hayashi.

"Kurenai" was covered by Brazilian power metal band Shaman, on the Japanese edition of their 2010 album Origins. It was also covered by Matenrou Opera on the compilation Crush! -90's V-Rock Best Hit Cover Songs-, which was released on January 26, 2011 and features current visual kei bands covering songs from bands that were important to the '90s visual kei movement. Female heavy metal band Show-Ya released a version of the song for their 2014 cover album Glamorous Show ~ Japanese Legendary Rock Covers, and recorded a music video to accompany it. Japanese voice actress Satsumi Matsuda released a version of the song on the 2014 album The Idolm@ster Cinderella Master Passion Jewelries! 002. British-Japanese metal band Esprit D'Air released a cover of the song as a single in 2021.

"Kurenai" is a playable song in the Taiko no Tatsujin series of music video games, in every arcade version since Taiko no Tatsujin 8, as well as Taiko no Tatsujin Wii: Do Don to 2 Daime, Taiko no Tatsujin: Portable DX, and Taiko no Tatsujin Plus.
