= Drudenhaus =

Studio album by Anorexia Nervosa
- Released: February 2, 2000
- Recorded: Drudenhaus Studios; Nantes, France
- Genre: Symphonic black metal
- Length: 46:36
- Label: Osmose
- Producer: Anorexia Nervosa

Anorexia Nervosa chronology
Sodomizing the Archedangel (1999)	Drudenhaus (2000)	New Obscurantis Order (2001)

Drudenhaus is the second studio album by the French symphonic black metal band Anorexia Nervosa. The album received positive reviews from critics, which meant a European breakthrough for the band.

== Track listing ==
1. "A Doleful Night in Thelema" - 4:57
2. "The Drudenhaus Anthem" - 5:13
3. "God Bless the Hustler" - 4:35
4. "Enter the Church of Fornication" - 5:33
5. "Tragedia Dekadencia" - 6:30
6. "Divine White Light of a Cumming Decadence" - 4:32
7. "Dirge & Requiem for My Sister Whore" - 4:17
8. "Das ist zum Erschiessen schön" - 5:00
9. "The Red Archromance" - 5:59
