= Sodomizing the Archedangel =

EP by Anorexia Nervosa
- Released: 1999
- Recorded: Drudenhaus Studio, February–March 1999
- Genre: Symphonic black metal
- Length: 17:11
- Label: Osmose Productions
- Producer: Anorexia Nervosa

Anorexia Nervosa chronology
Exile (1997)	Sodomizing the Archedangel (1999)	Drudenhaus (2000)

Sodomizing the Archedangel is an EP by the French symphonic black metal band Anorexia Nervosa. It was self-produced, and released in 1999 via Osmose Productions. It marks the transition from the band's previous industrial metal style to symphonic black metal, and is their first release to feature long-time vocalist Nicolas Saint-Morand (also known as R.M.S. Hreidmarr) and keyboardist Neb Xort.

== Track listing ==
All tracks are written by Anorexia Nervosa.

No.	Title	Length
1.	"Divine White Light of a Cumming Decadence"	5:03
2.	"Blood & Latex Terrortech War"	3:58
3.	"Excreted Communion Under Khaos Zero"	3:54
4.	"A Caress of Flesh & Vomited Romance"	4:16

The track "Divine White Light of a Cumming Decadence" would be re-recorded for the band's second studio album, Drudenhaus.

== Personnel ==
- R.M.S. Hreidmarr – vocals
- Stéphane Bayle – guitar
- Pierre Couquet – bass guitar
- Neb Xort – keyboards
- Nilcas Vant – drums, percussion
