= New Obscurantis Order =

- Cover art features the controversial Jan Saudek photograph Black Sheep & White Crow

Studio album by Anorexia Nervosa
- Released: November 23, 2001
- Recorded: Drudenhaus Studios - Nantes - France
- Genre: Symphonic black metal
- Length: 48:50
- Label: Osmose
- Producer: Xort & Anorexia Nervosa

Anorexia Nervosa chronology
Drudenhaus (2000)	New Obscurantis Order (2001)	Redemption Process (2004)

New Obscurantis Order is the third album by the French symphonic black metal band Anorexia Nervosa.

The album was rated a 9.5 out of 10 by Chronicles of Chaos.

== Track listing ==
1. "Mother Anorexia"
2. "Châtiment de la rose" (Eng: Chastisement of the Rose)
3. "Black Death, Nonetheless"
4. "Stabat Mater Dolorosa"
5. "Le Portail de la vierge" (Eng: The Virgin's Portal)
6. "The Altar of Holocausts"
7. "Hail Tyranny" (Rachmaninov Cover(Actual song called Prelude in C♯ Minor op. 3 no. 2))
8. "Ordo ab Chao - The Scarlet Communion"
9. "Solitude" (Candlemass Cover) (*)
10. "Metal Meltdown" (Judas Priest Cover) (**)

(*) 'Limited Edition' and 'Limited LP' version only.
(**) 'Limited LP' version only.
