= Standing Sex =

Single by X
- Released: October 25, 1991
- Genre: Power metal, speed metal, heavy metal
- Length: 9:21
- Label: Sony
- Songwriter: Yoshiki
- Producer: X

X singles chronology
"Silent Jealousy" (1991)	"Standing Sex" (1991)	"Say Anything" (1991)

"Standing Sex" is a single released by X Japan (then named X) on October 25, 1991.

== Summary ==
It and "The Last Song" are the only X Japan singles to not appear on one of the band's studio albums. The b-side is an edited version of "Joker", originally on their album Jealousy.

== Commercial performance ==
The song reached number 4 on the Oricon charts, and charted for 16 weeks. In 1991, with 187,160 copies sold was the 87th best-selling single of the year, being certified Gold by RIAJ.

== Track listing ==
No.	Title	Lyrics	Music	Arrangement	Length
1.	"Standing Sex"	Miyuki Igarashi	Yoshiki	X	4:23
2.	"Joker (Edited Version)"	Hide	Hide	X	4:58

== Personnel ==
- Co-Producer – Naoshi Tsuda
- Mixed by – Rich Breen
- Art Direction and Design – Mitsuo Izumisawa
- Photography – Masanori Kato, Michihiro Ikeda, Hideo Canno
