= Exile (Anorexia Nervosa album) =

Studio album by Anorexia Nervosa
- Released: December 19, 1997
- Recorded: LB Studios, Lille, France, 1997
- Genre: Industrial death metal
- Length: 50:51
- Label: Season of Mist
- Producer: Stéphane Buriez

Anorexia Nervosa chronology
Nihil Negativum (1995)	Exile (1997)	Sodomizing the Archedangel (1999)

Exile is the first studio album by the French symphonic black metal band Anorexia Nervosa. It was released in 1997, through Season of Mist. It is notable as the band's only industrial metal album, before they became a symphonic black metal band. It is also the only album to feature Marc Zabé as one of the guitarists and Stéphane Gerbaut on vocals, as he was later replaced by R.M.S. Hreidmarr when the band decided to abandon the industrial metal.

== Track listing ==
All tracks are written by Marc Zabé and Stéphane Gerbaut

No.	Title	Length
1.	"Prologue: To Exclude From the Circle of Generations"	5:30
2.	"Cycle I: Delusive Complexion" "Sequence 1: Spiritu Fornicationis / Action 1: Distressing Amnios"	6:36
3.	"Sequence 2: Say the World That Fall in the Sky / Action 2: Gnostic Wails"	3:35
4.	"Sequence 3: The Unveiled Mirror / Action 3: Other Wails"	2:50
5.	"Sequence 4: Divert the Necessities of the Body"	1:10
6.	"Cycle II: Burning Tongue" "Sequence 1: Against the Sail / Action 1: Vertebrae Embryo"	1:20
7.	"Sequence 2: Faith / Action 2: Discordant Effects of Suicides"	3:00
8.	"Sequence 3: Acclaim New Master / Action 3: Slave"	4:30
9.	"Sequence 4: First Tasting of Faecal Matter"	2:21
10.	"Cycle III: Man-Machine" "Sequence 1: Some Miracles of Entrails / Action 1: Not Showed"	2:47
11.	"Sequence 2: Spirit of the Valley / Action 2: Enclose"	4:45
12.	"Sequence 3: Flesh Goes Out Without Grace"	6:40
13.	"Epilogue: Running of Mental Fluids"	0:50
Total length:		45:51

== Personnel ==
Anorexia Nervosa

- Pierre Couquet – bass guitar
- Nilcas Vant – drums
- Marc Zabé, Stéphane Bayle – guitars
- Stéphane Gerbaud – vocals
