= Hai to Diamond =

Studio album by Glay
- Released: May 25, 1994
- Recorded: October 1993 – January 1994
- Studio: Studio 540, Bazooka Studio
- Genres: Power pop, alternative rock, gothic rock
- Labels: Extasy (1994); Warner Music Japan (2000); Loversoul Music & Associates (2014)
- Producer: Glay

Glay chronology
Hai to Diamond (1994)	Speed Pop (1995)

Hai to Diamond (Japanese: 灰とダイヤモンド, Hepburn: Hai to Daiyamondo; "Ash or Diamond") is the first album by the Japanese rock band Glay. It was released on May 25, 1994, by the independent label Extasy Records and peaked at #57 on the Oricon chart, with more than 51,000 copies sold.

== Overview ==
As an unsigned band, Glay promoted themselves by handing out flyers on the streets of Tokyo and giving out demo tapes. Eventually, Hide of X Japan gave one of their demos to his bandmate Yoshiki. During an October 1993 show, Yoshiki and his entourage came to watch and offered the band a contract to his record label Extasy Records.

The drums on Hai to Diamond were performed by Akira, who left the group in January before its release. Although "Rain" was written and demoed under the title "Julia (Reason For So Long)" prior to this album, the finished version includes lyrics and co-composition by Yoshiki. "Manatsu no Tobira" was used in the 1994 anime Yamato Takeru. "Rain", "Manatsu no Tobira" and "Kanojo no 'Modern...'", were all re-recorded for Glay's second album, Speed Pop (1995).

In celebration of their 20th anniversary, Glay released Hai to Diamond Anthology (灰とダイヤモンド Anthology) exactly 20 years later on May 25, 2014. The two CD/one DVD set includes remastered tracks, re-recordings, demo versions, and a live medley.

== Reception ==
Akio Kenzaki gave the album a very positive review in the special November 1995 Generation Edge issue of Rockin'f magazine. He wrote that with a high level of musicianship, tight cohesion amongst the band members, and meticulous arrangements, it is hard to believe that Hai to Diamond is a debut album. Finding it engaging from start to finish, he praised the variety as each song has a distinctively catchy hook, and called the lyrics unique.

"Manatsu no Tobira" was covered by v[Neu] for the compilation album Counteraction - V-Rock covered Visual Anime songs Compilation-, which was released on May 23, 2012, and features covers of songs by visual kei bands that were used in anime. "Kanojo no 'Modern...'" was covered for Crush! 3 - 90's V-Rock Best Hit Cover Love Songs-, which was released on June 27, 2012, and features current visual kei bands covering love songs by visual kei bands of the 90's. It was performed by Crash49, a one-off supergroup consisting of Mitsu from v[Neu], Yoshihiro from Guild, Aki from -Oz-, Karin from Nogod and Hiroki from D.

== Track listing ==
All tracks written and composed by Takuro except track 5, written by Yoshiki and composed by Takuro and Yoshiki.

1. "Manatsu no Tobira (Glay Version)" (真夏の扉 (GLAY VERSION)) – 5:19
2. "Kanojo no 'Modern...'" (彼女の "Modern…") – 4:40
3. "Kissin' Noise" – 4:50
4. "Hidoku Arifureta White Noise o Kure" (ひどくありふれたホワイトノイズをくれ) – 6:07
5. "Rain (Glay Version)" – 6:45
6. "Lady Close" – 4:48
7. "Two Bell Silence" – 4:09
8. "Sen no Knife ga Mune o Sasu" (千ノナイフガ胸ヲ刺ス) – 5:03
9. "Burst" – 3:21
10. "If (Hai to Diamond)" (if〜灰とダイヤモンド〜) – 4:45

== Personnel ==
- Teru – vocals
- Takuro – electric guitar, acoustic guitar
- Hisashi – electric guitar
- Jiro – bass guitar
- Akira – drums
- Mr. Kitaguchi – keyboards
- Makoto – keyboards
- Takuya Kon – violin
- Naoki Ichikawa – piano on track 5
