= Redemption Process =

Studio album by Anorexia Nervosa
- Released: November 9th, 2004
- Recorded: Drudenhaus Studios - Nantes - France
- Genre: Symphonic black metal
- Length: 45:34
- Label: Listenable Records
- Producer: Xort & Anorexia Nervosa

Anorexia Nervosa chronology
New Obscurantis Order (2001)	Redemption Process (2004)

Professional ratings
Review scores
Source	Rating
AllMusic	link

Redemption Process is the fourth album by the French symphonic black metal band Anorexia Nervosa. This album saw a change in lyrical content from lyrics dealing with violence and depression to redemption.

== Track listing ==
1. "The Shining"
2. "Antinferno"
3. "Sister September"
4. "Worship Manifesto"
5. "Codex-Veritas"
6. "An Amen"
7. "The Sacrament"
8. "Les Tzars" [European bonus] [ Indochine cover]
9. "Stabat Mater Dolorosa" [Japanese bonus] [2004 version]
10. "I'll Kill You" [Japanese bonus] [ X Japan cover]
11. "Sister September" [Korean bonus] [Demo version]
12. "Codex-Veritas" [Korean bonus] [Demo version]

== Charts ==
Chart (2004)	Peak position
French Albums (SNEP)	130
