= Once and for All (album) =

Live album by Loudness
- Released: April 25, 1994
- Recorded: June 01, 1992
- Venue: Club Citta Kawasaki, Tokyo, Japan
- Genre: Heavy metal
- Length: 59:03
- Label: Warner Music Japan
- Producer: Loudness

Loudness chronology
Loudness (1992)	Once and for All (1994)	Heavy Metal Hippies (1994)

Professional ratings
Review scores
Source	Rating
AllMusic	3.5/5 stars

Once and for All is the third live album by the Japanese band Loudness. It was released in 1994 and is the only live album with the formation that recorded the album Loudness in 1992. "House of 1.000 pleasures" is a song of the band Ezo, which singer Yamada was a member of before joining Loudness.

== Track listing ==
1. "Pray for the Dead" - 4:53
2. "Slaughter House" - 4:48
3. "Down 'n' Dirty" - 5:44
4. "Everyone Lies" - 5:23
5. "House of 1.000 Pleasures" - 6:24
6. "Black Widow" - 5:29
7. "Twisted" - 10:09
8. "Waking the Dead" - 3:55
9. "Crazy Night" - 6:05
10. "S.D.I." - 6:10

== Personnel ==
Loudness

- Masaki Yamada - vocals
- Akira Takasaki - guitars
- Taiji Sawada - bass
- Munetaka Higuchi - drums
