= Extasy Records =

Japanese record label

- Founded: 1986
- Founder: Yoshiki
- Status: Active
- Distributors: Media Factory (music division)/QQS Distribution; Independent (2007-); TuneCore (2022-)
- Genre: Rock; heavy metal; punk; pop
- Country of origin: Japan
- Location: Tokyo, Japan; Los Angeles, California, USA
- Official website: www.extasyrecords.co.jp

Extasy Records is a Japanese record label founded in April 1986 by Yoshiki, co-founder of the rock band X Japan. The label's first release was X's 1986 single "Orgasm".

Over the next few years, the label signed several then-little-known bands, among them future million-selling Glay and Luna Sea. Extasy along with Free-Will are credited with helping to spread the visual kei movement. The label also hosted a series of events to promote the groups, called Extasy Summits, which would also feature formerly signed bands that had already moved on to a major label.

== History ==
Yoshiki founded Extasy Records in Japan in 1986, using money he received from his mother when she sold her business. He explained that, after releasing "I'll Kill You" in 1985, things did not work out with Dada Records, and although they were approached by various other record labels, he and his band X Japan (then still named X) did not understand the music industry and decided to just form their own label so they could do whatever they wanted. X's second single, "Orgasm", was Extasy's first release in April 1986. The label then went into hiatus for two years until reviving in order to release X's first album. April 1988's Vanishing Vision was a huge success for an independent band. After that, Yoshiki said the label continued because various acts suddenly started contacting him to release their records.

Over the next couple of years Extasy signed many bands that would go on to have varying degrees of success and produced their early records, including Zi:Kill and Tokyo Yankees. Yoshiki said that he had no plans to make Extasy a big success, he simply wanted to shake things up in the independent scene. When asked how he decided which bands to sign, Yoshiki said that they were essentially all just friends or acquaintances. For example, Sex George said he was a roadie for X until he bugged Yoshiki to release the June 1988 single "Swapping Party" by his band Ladies Room. Ex-Ans vocalist Tohru Hara said he had been with Extasy since its inception, and both he and Yoshiki said that he handled all the day-to-day work for the label as of 1989. Both Sex George and Ken of Zi:Kill said that, unlike most record labels, Extasy allowed them to make their records however they wanted.

In February 1991, Yoshiki's X Japan bandmate Hide saw a band called Lunacy perform, and introduced him to them. Yoshiki signed them to Extasy, they changed their name to Luna Sea and took part in the label's Nuclear Fusion Tour in March with Gilles de Rais and Sighs of Love Potion. On the tour, a 3-track sample CD including a song from each band was released. The following year Luna Sea's self-titled debut album was released and they held a successful 45-date tour, enabling them to sign with major label MCA Victor in May 1992.

Hide gave one of Glay's demo tapes to Yoshiki, who then brought an entourage to watch their October 1993 show, where he offered the band a contract to Extasy Records. Their debut album, Hai to Diamond, was released on May 25, 1994.

To promote their bands, the label organized concerts called Extasy Summits, which besides current contracted bands, also included former acts who had left for major record labels. The first was held at Osaka Bourbon House in September 1988, with several more held, including one at Shibuya Public Hall in September 1989. Footage from two of the concerts was released on VHS (the second also on Laserdisc); Muteki to Kaite Extasy to Yomu!! Extasy Summit '91 at Nippon Budokan (無敵と書いてEXTASYと読む!! EXTASY SUMMIT '91 AT NIPPON BUDŌKAN) recorded at the Nippon Budokan in October 1991 and Minna Mumei-Datta, Dakedo... Muteki-Datta Extasy Summit 1992 (みんな無名だった、だけど…無敵だった EXTASY SUMMIT 1992) recorded at Osaka-jō Hall in October 1992. The October 1992 Summit was actually X Japan's first public performance with their new bassist Heath.

The compilation album Lighting & Thunder was released in October 1998. On June 21, 2000, the compilation album History of Extasy 15th Anniversary was released. It includes 19 songs released by 14 different bands while on the label in celebration of its 15th anniversary. The album reached number 14 on the Oricon music chart.

In 2000, Yoshiki signed a deal with Warner Music Group to distribute the record labels Extasy Japan and Extasy Records International. Records on Extasy Japan were distributed in Japan by Warner Music Japan and records on Extasy Records International were distributed in America by Warner Bros. Records, marking the first time the two companies worked together in this way. The first release on Extasy Japan was the July 2000 single "Pearl" by singer Shiro, while the first release on Extasy Records International was by singer Aja in 2001. According to Yoshiki's younger brother and current Extasy Records president, Kōki Hayashi, Extasy Japan was unconnected to Extasy Records and dissolved in just over a year, after accumulating 100 million yen in debt as it tried to become a major record label.

Although inactive since 2003, Extasy Records continued to exist. In September 2007, Yoshiki announced that the soundtrack for the American movie Catacombs would be released on Extasy Records International. The soundtrack includes songs by Violet UK and Zilch.

Yoshiki has referred to the first day, October 14, 2016, of the three-day Visual Japan Summit at Makuhari Messe as "Extasy Summit" as it saw X Japan, Luna Sea and Glay perform.

In 2022, Yoshiki's brother, Kōki, became president and CEO of Extasy Records, establishing a distribution partnership with TuneCore. Previously, their mother had been president until her death that May. In January 2023, Extasy Records announced the formation of the label Extasy Beyond as part of its re-launch. The new label was described as aiming to sign acts that have the "Extasy spirit" and would not be bound to any specific musical genre. Its first act was Chiitan ☆ Kiss ~Ai no Rock Band~, a heavy metal band led by the mascot character Chiitan.

== Artists ==
All of the following artists were at one point on the label:

=== Extasy Records ===
- Acid Bell
- Brain Drive
- Breath
- Deep
- Ex-Ans
- Gilles de Rais
- Glay
- Hypermania
- La Vie En Rose
- Ladies Room
- Luna Sea
- P2H
- Poison/Poison Arts
- Magnitude9.8
- Screaming Mad George & Psychosis
- Sweet Death/Media Youth
- The Hate Honey
- The Zolge
- Tokyo Yankees
- Velvet Blue
- Virus
- X Japan
- Youthquake
- Zi:Kill

=== Extasy Japan ===
The sub-label logo used for Extasy Japan and Extasy International.

- Beast
- Revenus
- Shiro
- Shizuka Kudō

=== Extasy International ===
- Abandoned Pools/Tommy Walter
- Aja Daashuur
- Kidneythieves
- Laura Dawn
- Red Delicious
- sub.bionic
- Violet UK

== Extasy Recording Studios ==
Extasy Recording Studios was a recording studio complex owned by Yoshiki at 5253 Lankershim Blvd in North Hollywood, California, United States. Formerly known as One on One Recording, Yoshiki bought it from the previous owner, Jim David, in 1992 and renamed the studio after his record label in 1999. Discussing the purchase in 2010, Yoshiki explained that in Los Angeles people told him that One on One had the "best drum-sounding room" and so he attempted to book recording time there. However, Metallica had it booked for "almost a year straight" for their self-titled album with numerous bands scheduled after that, and he was told sarcastically that the only way to get in was to buy it, so he did.

Previously, well-known albums were recorded there, including ...And Justice for All and Metallica (better known as The Black Album) by Metallica, When the Pawn... by Fiona Apple, Crazy Nights and Psycho Circus by Kiss, and Dirt by Alice in Chains.

Since Yoshiki purchased the facility in 1992, X Japan and Yoshiki's related projects were the main recordings. Extasy Recording Studios was taken over by 17 Hertz, LLC in 2012 and is now known as 17 Hertz Studio.

Yoshiki also bought Brooklyn Recording Studios, which housed the Los Angeles offices of Maverick Records, in April 1998 from owners Madonna and Freddy DeMann. He renamed it One on One South, before using it as the headquarters of Extasy Records International.
