= Anorexia Nervosa (band) =

French black metal band

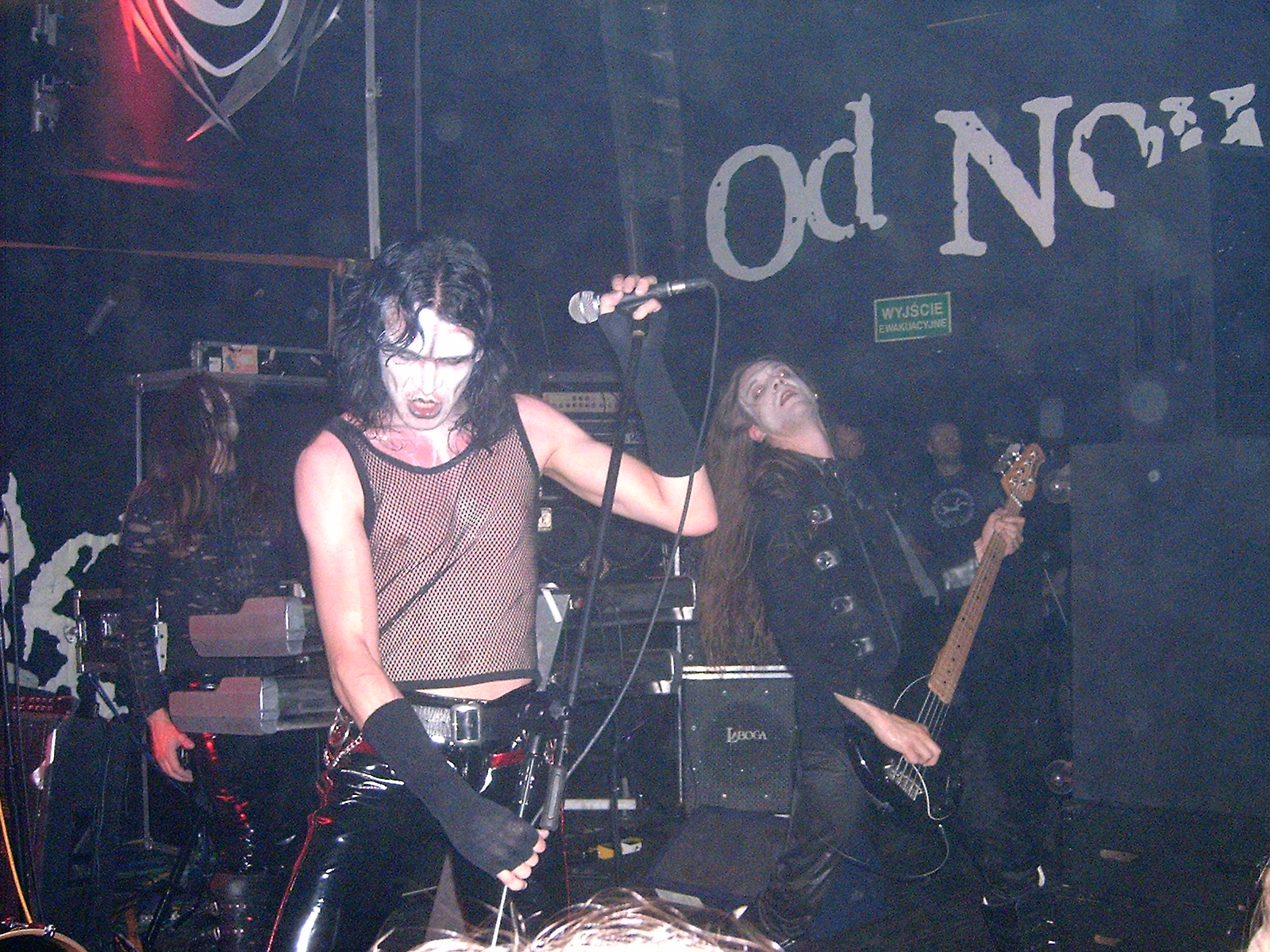
- Anorexia Nervosa performing live on tour with Vader in Poland, on 11 September 2005

Background information
- Also known as: Necromancia (1991–95)
- Origin: Limoges, France
- Genres: Symphonic black metal, industrial death metal (early)
- Years active: 1991–2005 (hiatus)
- Labels: Season of Mist, Osmose, Listenable
- Members: Stéphane Bayle; Nilcas Vant; Pierre Couquet; Neb Xort
- Past members: Rose Hreidmarr; Mark Zabé; Stéphane Gerbaud
- Website: myspace.com/motheranorexia

Anorexia Nervosa is a French symphonic black metal band from Limoges, formed in 1991. They are "on hold" due to vocalist RMS Hreidmarr's departure.

== Biography ==
Anorexia Nervosa was formed in 1991 as Necromancia, with Stéphane Bayle (guitar), Marc Zabé (guitar), Pierre Couquet (bass), Nilcas Vant (drums) and Stéphane Gerbaud (vocals). As Necromancia, they produced the 1993 demo The Garden of Delight. A second demo, Nihil Negativum, featured a dark, industrial atmosphere that anticipated their album Exile. During a concert in the south of France, Michael Berberian of Season of Mist Records offered the band a contract. Exile was released in 1997. Reminiscent of Nihil Negativum, Exile had a dark industrial sound. Twenty-four hundred copies of the album were sold, gaining access to a larger audience and a series of concerts with Cradle of Filth, Absu, Misanthrope, amongst others.

They left the label after the release of Exile, and replaced Gerbaud and Zabé with singer RMS Hreidmarr and keyboardist Neb Xort. They pursued a self-described "dark nihilistic metal" direction featuring a fast, orchestrated sound. They recorded second album Sodomizing the Archangel at the band's Drudenhaus Studio and released it on Osmose Productions in 1999. They followed with the Drudenhaus album, released in March 2000.

Their 2001 release, New Obscurantis Order, featured faster tempos, polished orchestrations and a more violent sound. They toured Europe with Cradle of Filth and Rotting Christ. Anorexia Nervosa went on hiatus for three years and returned with the album Redemption Process in 2004 on Listenable Records.

One year later, the band released The September E.P. which features a director's cut of Sister September, three covers, and four live tracks. The EP was released as a "goodie" from the band until they were ready to record their next studio album.

On 20 December 2005, vocalist Rose Hreidmarr quit the band. He said,

"Leaving Anorexia Nervosa was definitely not the easiest thing to do as we've shared so much during our time together as this band had become a vivid part of my daily life. For seven years, the band has been giving me so many opportunities on a musical and human level and has heavily contributed to become the person I'm today. Still, I honestly thought I had reached the end of a personal era with the album 'Redemption Process' and I now feel the need to take a different path. I'm also absolutely proud of what I have been able to achieve with the rest of the band members who will always remain my best friends and I wish them the very best for the future."

Failure to find a replacement singer caused guitarist Stéphane Bayle to put the band in "stand-by" mode, fearing it may become a "parody" of itself.

Since leaving Anorexia Nervosa, Rose Hreidmarr has sung for black/industrial metal band The Cosa Nostra Klub. In 2018, he became the singer for white supremacist black metal group Baise ma hache.

Stéphane Bayle and Neb Xort participated in Jensara Swann and Ben Notox's band The Veil, on their first album Sleeping Among Serpents, released in 2006 and as session musicians for their first concerts. Neb Xort is involved with the band as producer, and engineered The Veil's second album, Vestige, in 2008, and Ad Inferna's Trance N Dance in 2009. Bayle produced The Cosa Nostra Klub's second album, L'Hymne la Joie, in 2007.

== Musical style ==
In the band's early days as Necromancia, the band played death metal, exemplified on their demo The Garden of Delight; but began to incorporate elements of industrial metal in their sound, which laid the basis for the dissonant and experimental sound on their debut album, Exile, which often switched between fast tempos and thrashing guitars back to a slow, ambient style, complemented with a grim vocal delivery. Nonetheless, with the departure of original vocalist Stéphane Gerbaud and the entry of R.M.S. Hreidmarr, the band went through a seismic genre shift, abandoning their early industrial death metal sound for a symphonic black metal sound, comparable to Cradle of Filth, which is considered the band's signature sound.

The band's debut, Exile, a concept album, based itself on themes of neurosis and experimentation on madness. Violence and depression would largely feature as the main source of the band's lyricism. However, Redemption Process is a concept album that focuses on lyrics about finding redemption.

== Band members ==
=== Final lineup ===
- Stéphane Bayle: guitar (1995–2005)
- Nilcas Vant: drums (1995–2005)
- Pierre Couquet: bass (1995–2005)
- Neb Xort: keyboards (1998–2005)

=== Former ===
- Marc Zabé: guitar, keyboards (1995–1998)
- Stéphane Gerbaud: vocals (1995–1998)
- Nicolas "R.M.S." Saint-Morand: vocals (1998–2005)

Timeline

== Discography ==
=== Studio albums ===
- Exile (1997)
- Drudenhaus (2000)
- New Obscurantis Order (2001)
- Redemption Process (2004)

=== EPs ===
- Sodomizing the Archedangel (1999)
- The September E.P. (2005)

=== Demos ===
- The Garden of Delight (1993)
- Nihil Negativum (1995)

=== Compilation albums ===
- Suicide Is Sexy (2004)

=== Bootleg albums ===
- Disturbed (2009)
