= Jealousy (X Japan album) =

1991 studio album by X Japan

Studio album by X
- Released: July 1, 1991
- Recorded: December 1990–June 1991 at Complex Studio, Sound Castle Studio, Studio City, Alpha Studio, Mad Hatter Studios
- Genres: Heavy metal; speed metal; symphonic power metal
- Length: 51:23
- Languages: English; Japanese
- Label: Sony
- Producer: X

X chronology
Blue Blood (1989)	Jealousy (1991)	Art of Life (1993)

Singles from Jealousy
- 1. "Silent Jealousy" Released: September 11, 1991; 2. "Say Anything" Released: December 1, 1991

Jealousy is the third studio album by Japanese heavy metal band X Japan, then known as simply X. The album was released on July 1, 1991, by Sony, as the band's second major-label release. Jealousy is the band's best-selling album, having sold more than one million copies. It topped the Oricon chart and stayed on the chart for 50 weeks. The album's singles would also reach the top three on the chart. It is their last album under the name X, before changing to X Japan, and the last to feature Taiji on bass, who would be replaced by Heath. In 2018, readers and professional musicians voted Jealousy the sixth best album in the history of hard rock and heavy metal in We Rock magazine's "Metal General Election".

== Overview ==
After releasing their second album, Blue Blood, in 1989, which reached number six on the Oricon chart and charted for more than 100 weeks, selling over half of a million copies, X Japan received the "Grand Prix New Artist of the Year" award at the 4th Japan Gold Disc Awards in 1990. When discussing the band's future at a press conference following their May 17, 1990 concert at Osaka-jō Hall, the final date of the Rose & Blood Tour, bassist Taiji proclaimed X would create the first Japanese album to become successful internationally. He also stated that, while they relied heavily on drummer and principal songwriter Yoshiki for Blue Blood, this time all five members would be working together. Sony told the band they could go anywhere they wanted, so Yoshiki visited Paris and London, while the other members chose Los Angeles. When deciding where to record their next album, Yoshiki was outvoted.

X left Japan on November 24, 1990, to begin recording Jealousy in Los Angeles. When members arrived back in their home country in June, 500 members of the Japan Self-Defence Forces were at the airport to control the crowd. The album was released in July 1991 and debuted at number one, selling over 600,000 copies. On August 24, the band performed their first concert at Japan's largest indoor concert venue, the Tokyo Dome. This was part of the Violence in Jealousy Tour, which lasted to the end of the year, when once again Yoshiki collapsed, this time after the October 24 Yokohama Arena gig. The X with Orchestra concert at NHK Hall on December 8, saw the band perform backed by an orchestra.

The band began 1992 with sold-out concerts at the Tokyo Dome on January 5–7, titled Tokyo Dome 3 Days: On the Verge of Destruction. Just days later, on January 31, it was announced that Taiji had left the group. On August 24, 1992, X held a press conference in New York at Rockefeller Center, where Heath was announced as their new bassist. Around this time, the band's success in Japan made an international breakthrough appear likely, leading to an American record contract with Atlantic Records and the renaming of the band from X to X Japan, in order to distinguish from the American punk rock group X. (An American album release would never happen.) Their first show with Heath was at the October 1992 Extasy Summit at Osaka-jō Hall.

A special edition of Jealousy, that included a second disc of instrumental versions of some songs, was released on February 14, 2007, and reached number 31 on the charts. A remastered version that reached number 241 was released on March 19, 2008.

=== Composition ===
Jealousy is X Japan's most diverse in terms of songwriting credits. Besides Yoshiki, who composed and wrote four songs, guitarist Hide composed and wrote the lyrics for "Miscast", "Love Replica" and "Joker", Taiji composed two songs, "Desperate Angel" and "Voiceless Screaming", for which vocalist Toshi wrote the lyrics, while guitarist Pata contributed his only song in the band's catalogue (excluding Dahlia's "Wriggle", which he wrote with Heath). "Voiceless Screaming" was written during a period when Yoshiki's health condition worsened and they needed more songs. The lyrics express Toshi's feelings about the previous loss of his voice.

The song structure of "Silent Jealousy" is comparable to "Kurenai", opening with a calm intro, performed on a single instrument, followed by a speed metal composition with symphonic elements. It also includes a short excerpt of Tchaikovsky's "Swan Lake" during the piano-driven bridge. The album's only other speed metal tune, "Stab Me in the Back", is one of X's oldest songs, having been written mostly in English with a few Japanese lines in 1986. An entirely English version was first recorded for the 1987 Victor Records sampler Skull Thrash Zone Volume I, which was the band's first material with Pata. This album version's lyrics were rewritten again.

=== Release ===
Jealousy was released on July 1, 1991, by major label Sony. In the third counting week of July it reached number one on the Oricon chart, with sales of 612,920 copies. By the end of the year it had sold 828,000 copies, and was the 12th-best-selling album of the year. As it charted for 50 weeks, it was certified million by the RIAJ, and in 1992, with 285,430 copies sold, it was the 62nd-best-selling album. In 2007 Oricon counted 1.113 million copies sold. A remastered edition was released on February 14, 2007, which included a bonus CD with instrumental versions of some songs. This edition charted at number thirty-one. A Blu-spec CD2 version of Jealousy remastered by Bob Ludwig was released on July 27, 2016.

The first single, "Silent Jealousy", preceded the album's release. It reached number three on the fourth counting week of September 1991, with sales of 78,360 copies. In the upcoming weeks, it was at number five and nine respectively, with sales of 52,470, and 23,040 copies. It charted for 18 weeks. In 1991, with 234,950 copies sold, it was the 58th-best-selling single of the year and was certified Gold by the RIAJ.

In October the single "Standing Sex" was released, though the title song wasn't included on the album. It and "The Last Song", released in 1998, are the band's only two singles not to appear on any of their studio albums. It reached number four on the charts, and charted for 16 weeks. In 1991, with 187,160 copies sold, it was the 87th-best-selling single of the year.

The single "Say Anything" was released in December. It reached number three during the second counting week of December 1991, with sales of 78,510 copies. In the upcoming two weeks, it was at number three and eleven respectively, with sales of 65,340, and 39,750 copies. It charted for 25 weeks. In 1992, with 537,790 copies sold, it was the 33rd-best-selling single of the year and certified Platinum by the RIAJ.

== Reception ==
Professional ratings
Review scores
Source	Rating
Allmusic	3.5/5 stars

Jealousy is generally positively received. Mamoru Gotō of Re:minder wrote that the album shows the distinct charisma of each individual member of X, explaining that, unlike their previous albums which are dominated by Yoshiki's compositions, most songs on Jealousy were written by other band members, giving it much variety. He described "Silent Jealousy" as perfectly encapsulating the essence of the band, "Stab Me in the Back" as the fastest song in X's entire musical catalogue, and "Joker" as a hard rock number, reminiscent of hair metal from the West Coast of the United States. Gotō found "Love Replica" to be the record's biggest surprise, as it opens with industrial rock-like metallic noises, followed by a restless, hammering beat, before the rhythm shifts into a "lighthearted, European-style triple-time waltz" with lyrics sung entirely in French. He also wrote that the mid-album respite provided by the country-style instrumental "White Wind from Mr. Martin ~Pata's Nap~" and the traditional British folk-styled "Voiceless Screaming" reminded him of the dynamic contrasts found on Led Zeppelin IV.

Like Gotō, music writer Takuya Ito noted that, with each band member contributing to the songwriting, Jealousy has more variety than X's previous works, and showcases their ambition to explore new territory while retaining their signature style; "Although the destructive impulse felt on the previous two works has subsided, the diverse musical styles serve as a new starting point."

Alexey Eremenko of Allmusic called the album "a nice document of pre-grunge heavy music, sporting thin production, twin guitars, and glam rock aplomb". He wrote that on it, X go through a good amount of "quasi-epics and Yngwie Malmsteen-inspired neo-classical leads on the album, only to lapse back again into a hard 'n' heavy frenzy." He criticized "Desperate Angel", which he feels could have been a huge metal hymn, for instead becoming an "annoyingly memorable heavy pop hit" in the vein of Def Leppard. Eremenko, who rated the album three and a half out of five stars, concluded that the remarkable thing about Jealousy is that "for all its hair metal backbone, it's a pretty diverse record", and that despite being ballad-heavy, "the slower songs neither bog it down nor sound the same, thanks to good piano and acoustic guitar work as well as clever arrangements".

Jealousy was ranked number 7 on Bounce's 2009 list of 54 Standard Japanese Rock Albums. In 2018, readers and professional musicians voted Jealousy the sixth best album in the history of hard rock and heavy metal in We Rock magazine's "Metal General Election".

== Legacy ==
"Silent Jealousy" was covered by the Australian metal band Lord as a bonus track on the Japanese version of their 2007 album Ascendence, with vocals performed by Hideaki Niwa. Finnish power metal band Sonata Arctica also covered part of the song during one of the concerts on their Japanese tour. It also served as wrestler Chris Jericho's one-night entrance song for his return to Japan.

"Miscast" was performed live by hide during some of his solo concerts. A studio version was completed after his death and put on the 2002 compilation Cafe Le Psyence: hide Lemoned Compilation. The song was also covered live by Dir En Grey on May 4, 2008, at the "hide memorial summit". Taiji's later band, Taiji with Heavens, has also performed "Miscast" live.

Taiji's band D.T.R reworked "Voiceless Screaming" for the acoustic version of their 1994 debut album, Dirty Trashroad ~ Acoustic, where it was titled simply "Voiceless". Taiji with Heavens also covered it, releasing it for free on their website as "Voiceless Screaming ~from Heavens". Toshi also performed a solo cover of the song at two shows in 2013.

"Say Anything" was covered by the pop group Globe, of which Yoshiki was briefly a member, on their 2002 album Global Trance 2. It was also used as the theme song for the TV drama Lullaby Keiji.

== Track listing ==
No.	Title	Lyrics	Music	Length
1.	"Es Dur no Piano Sen" (Es Durのピアノ線)		Yoshiki	1:50
2.	"Silent Jealousy"	Yoshiki	Yoshiki	7:15
3.	"Miscast"	hide	hide	5:12
4.	"Desperate Angel"	Toshi	Taiji	5:48
5.	"White Wind from Mr. Martin ~Pata's Nap~"		Pata	1:01
6.	"Voiceless Screaming"	Toshi	Taiji	6:11
7.	"Stab Me in the Back"	Hitomi Shiratori	Yoshiki	3:54
8.	"Love Replica"	hide	hide	4:33
9.	"Joker"	hide	hide	5:12
10.	"Say Anything"	Yoshiki	Yoshiki	8:40

Disc 2 2007 Special edition bonus disc
No.	Title	Length
1.	"Silent Jealousy (Instrumental)"	7:21
2.	"Miscast (Instrumental)"	5:16
3.	"Desperate Angel (Instrumental)"	5:54
4.	"Voiceless Screaming (Instrumental)"	6:18
5.	"Stab Me in the Back (Instrumental)"	3:52
6.	"Joker (Instrumental)"	5:32
7.	"Say Anything (Instrumental)"	8:42

== Personnel ==
X

- Vocals: Toshi
- Guitar: hide
- Guitar: Pata
- Bass: Taiji
- Drums, piano: Yoshiki

Additional musicians

- Synthesizer: Steve Croes
- Harmonica: Stanley Behrens
- Background vocals on "Desperate Angel": Roger Love, Gene Miller, Warren Ham
- Voice: Angel Figueroa, Laura McBroom ("Joker"), Sylviane Le Chevalier ("Love Replica")
- Concertmaster: Bruce Dukov
- Conductor, arranger (strings): David Campbell

Production

- Producer, arranger: X
- Co-producer: Naoshi Tsuda, Roger Love (vocal)
- Executive producer: Hiroshi Inagaki
- Engineer: Joe Tortorici, Kenji Nakai, Stanley Salters
- Assistant engineer: Bob Lacivita, Dave Levy, Duane Seykora, Gregg McConnell, Jeff Alden, Jeff Rach, Jiro Ogawa, John Paterno, Motonobu Mantani, Scott Jochim, Tracy Chisholm
- Recorded by: Mitsuyasu Abe, Tetsuhiro Miyajima
- Mixed By, Engineer: Bruce Miller, Paul Winger, Rich Breen
- Mixed, Recorded: Gremlin
- Mastered by: Teppei Kasai
- Creative director: Shigeo Gotoh
- Art direction, Design: Hiroshi Ooki
- Front cover concept: Screaming Mad George, Yoshiki
- Mask and make up: Screaming Mad George
- Photographer: Takashi Matsuda, Bruno
