= Taiji (musician) =

Japanese musician (1966–2011)

Taiji 沢田 泰司
- Taiji performing with X circa 1990

Background information
- Also known as: Ray
- Born: July 12, 1966; Ichikawa, Chiba, Japan
- Died: July 17, 2011 (aged 45) Saipan, Northern Mariana Islands
- Genres: Heavy metal; hard rock
- Occupations: Musician; songwriter
- Instruments: Bass guitar; guitar
- Years active: 1982–2011
- Formerly of: X; Loudness
- Website: taiji-tsglaston.com

Japanese name
- Kanji: 沢田 泰司
- Hiragana: さわだ たいじ
Transcriptions
- Romanization: Sawada Taiji

Taiji Sawada (Japanese: 沢田 泰司, Hepburn: Sawada Taiji; July 12, 1966 – July 17, 2011), also known mononymously as Taiji, was a Japanese musician and songwriter. He is best known as bassist of the rock band X from 1986 to 1992. The band rose to prominence in the late 1980s and early 1990s, credited as founders of the Japanese visual kei movement. After leaving X in January 1992, Taiji went on to work with many other recording acts, including Loudness and D.T.R.

In July 2011, Taiji was arrested in Saipan for a violent outburst that took place on the flight there. Facing federal charges, he attempted suicide by hanging in his jail cell, which left him brain dead. Taiji died in a hospital on July 11 after his family decided to turn off his life support. In 2018, readers and professional musicians voted him the best bassist in the history of hard rock and heavy metal in We Rock magazine's "Metal General Election".

== Early life ==
Taiji Sawada was born in Ichikawa, Chiba, on July 12, 1966. He was the second son of three children. His younger sister Masayo is a singer. When Taiji was two years old, the first joint of the middle finger on his right hand was amputated in an accident. In interviews, the musician claimed this made it easier for him to play. Although bassists typically pluck with their index and middle fingers, Taiji used his index and ring fingers. When he was five years old, Taiji was hospitalized for over eight months with life-threatening nephrosis. As a child, he was athletic and often got into fights, although he claimed he never started them and likened himself to the fictional hero Kamen Rider who fought for "justice". In his third year at Ichikawa Daiichi Elementary School, Taiji joined the soccer team and a local baseball team. When he entered junior high school, he gave up soccer due to back pain and joined the table tennis club.

Taiji learned to play acoustic guitar just from watching his father play the one they had in the house. In his second year of elementary school, it took him three months to learn "Kinjirareta Asobi". At the same time he performed on stage for the first time at a school event. This saw him fall in love with guitar and music, including The Beatles and Queen. By junior high school, he was obsessed with Western music and bands like Kiss, Rainbow and Motörhead. He obtained an electric guitar upon entering Chiba Meitoku High School, which he chose simply because they had a light music club. However, he dropped out after only one year.

== Life and career ==
=== 1982–1992: Early bands and X ===
After dropping out of high school in 1982, Taiji continued to play guitar in the band Trash, which he had formed with classmates. One of the members was future Ladies Room vocalist Hyaku. Since the other members were still in school, Taiji paid most of their studio-rental expenses with money from his part-time job making signs. They broke up after one year. After meeting the leader of the heavy metal band Dementia at a studio, Taiji was invited to join them at the age of 17. He switched to bass and adopted the stage name "Ray". At his mother's request, he left home and became a live-in employee at the love hotel in Shibuya where he worked part-time. After a year, which saw the release of Dementia Live!, Taiji quit the group. In his autobiography, Taiji writes that he had visions of forming a band named Dead Wire, but there were no other members and only a single song was written, which was performed by his friend Tetsu's band Saver Tiger. However, some sources state that Tetsu and his fellow Saver Tiger and D'erlanger bandmate Kyo were actual members of the short-lived Dead Wire. Taiji then played briefly with the heavy metal band Prowler for about three months.

In October 1985, Taiji was invited to join X by their drummer and bandleader Yoshiki. He agreed on the condition that other member changes be made, as he felt the then-current lineup would not be able to play the songs that he would arrange, leaving X a trio where he played both bass and guitar. However, Taiji was unhappy when he still occasionally had to play guitar even after they recruited a guitarist, and left the band after only two months. But he officially rejoined X in November 1986. His first recordings with them were "Stab Me in the Back" and "No Connexion" for the 1987 omnibus album Skull Thrash Zone Volume I. X released their first album Vanishing Vision in April 1988 and toured extensively in support of the record. They became one of the first Japanese acts to achieve mainstream success while on an independent label. X are also widely credited as one of the pioneers of visual kei, a movement among Japanese musicians comparable to Western glam. During their independent years, Taiji acted as hairstylist for the other members and created almost all of their costumes. Their major label debut album, Blue Blood, was released in April 1989 and debuted at number six on the Oricon chart. Its success earned the band the "Grand Prix New Artist of the Year" award at the 4th annual Japan Gold Disc Awards in 1990. Their third album Jealousy was released in 1991 and debuted at number one, selling over 600,000 copies. It was later certified million by the RIAJ.

Taiji wrote a handful of songs in X, including "Phantom of Guilt", "Desperate Angel" and "Voiceless Screaming". He claimed that the arrangements to most of the band's songs were done by Hide and himself. He notably played acoustic guitar on "Voiceless Screaming". Pata described how Taiji gave him pointers on how to play the song during the Violence in Jealousy Tour in 1991, and encouraged him to write his own, which lead to "White Wind from Mr. Martin ~Pata's Nap~". Some unpublished songs from Taiji's time in X were later released in 2001 as Rose & Blood -Indies of X-, an album not sanctioned by the band.

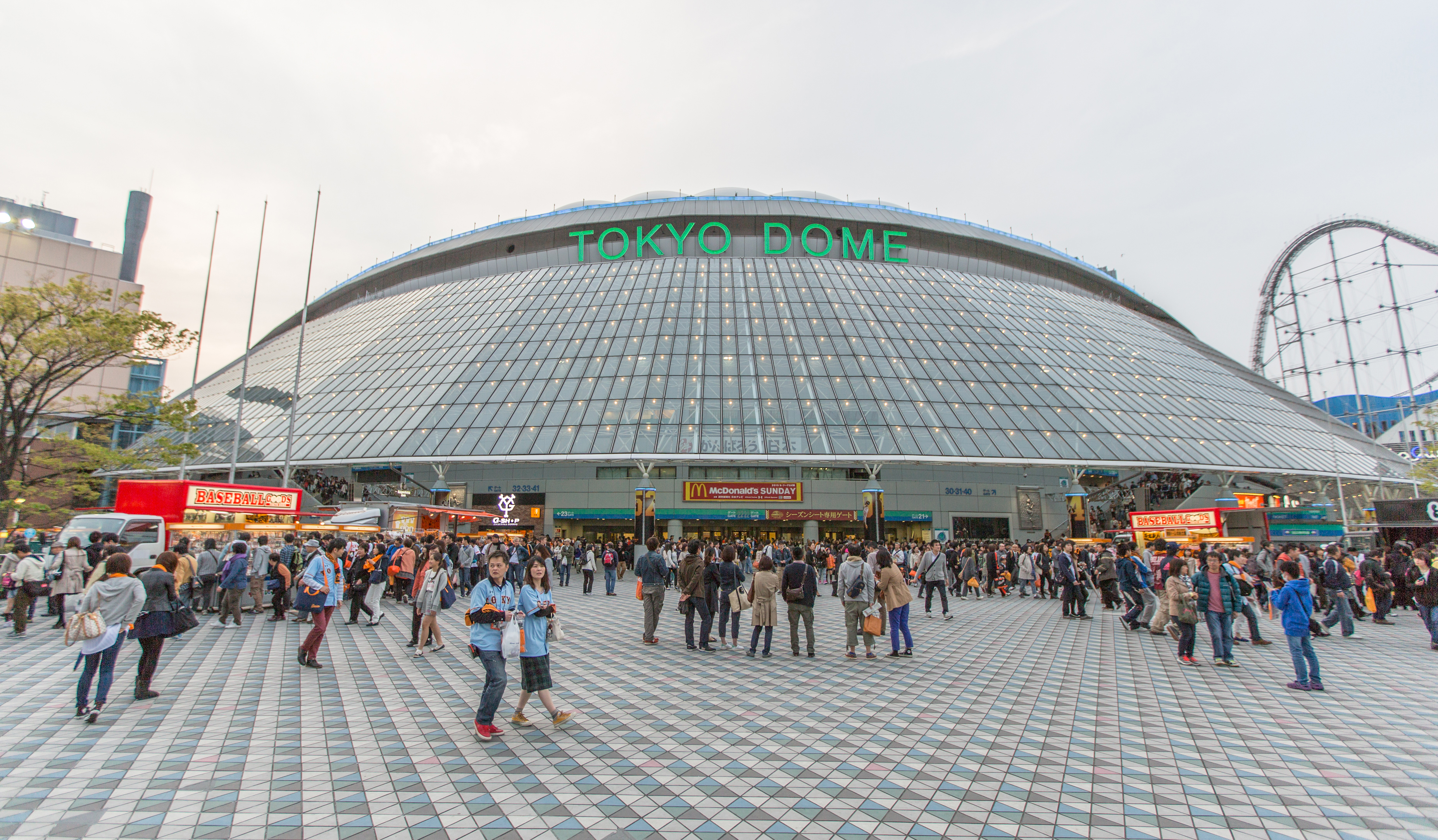
Taiji left X in January 1992, after performing three consecutive sold-out concerts at the Tokyo Dome.

In early December 1991, Yoshiki asked Taiji to quit X and the bassist acquiesced as long as he could perform at their three upcoming Tokyo Dome concerts. In his autobiography, Taiji speculated that the main reason was because he often insisted to bandleader Yoshiki that the members should share the royalties equally. He said this issue dated back to the recording of Blue Blood, when he suggested they record songs written by other members, and eventually resulted in him being the only member of X with the contract of a studio musician. He also noted that Yoshiki and Hide had already had various discussions about his behavior and future in X, and the royalty thing might have been the trigger to finally kick him out. While he admitted to frequently causing arguments with Yoshiki by speaking his mind, Taiji said it was all done out of his love for the band. When asked about Taiji's departure in 2016, Yoshiki said that while he respected Taiji's musical skills, he "crossed the line of our band's rules" and "To this day I still don't know if the decision was right or wrong, but we didn't have a choice."

Taiji's last concerts with X were titled Tokyo Dome 3 Days: On the Verge of Destruction, three consecutive sold-out nights at the Tokyo Dome on January 5–7, 1992. His departure from the band was announced on January 31. Taiji's final show was later released on home video and CD, with the latter reaching number three on the charts. Seven months after his departure, X held a press conference at Rockefeller Center in New York City where they introduced their new bassist Heath and announced that they were changing their name to "X Japan".

=== 1992–2006: Loudness, D.T.R, and Cloud Nine ===
Shortly after leaving X, Taiji was invited to join the heavy metal band Loudness in April 1992 by Akira Takasaki, one of his role models when he was learning guitar. He was recommended by their outgoing bassist, Masayoshi Yamashita. Taiji quickly took part in recording the studio album Loudness and went on a series of tours into 1993, one of which later produced the live album Once and for All. However, the band's contract with their agency expired in May 1993, making their future uncertain as it was difficult to conduct activities. As such, Taiji began forming his own band, and when he was contacted in November about continuing Loudness, he had to decline because he had already signed a contract for the new band. Speaking of his time in Loudness, Taiji said it brought both joy and pressure, explaining that getting to be in his favorite band was a dream come true, but that constantly being compared to Yamashita was "hell".

Taiji decided he was better off forming a new band instead of joining an established one, and had no problem getting a record deal thanks to his history. Finding members on the other hand proved more difficult. Dirty Trashroad was announced in April 1994 with Taiji on bass and guitar, Mitsuo Takeuchi (Joe-Erk) on vocals, Taiji Fujimoto (The Dead Pop Stars, Judy and Mary) on guitar and Toshihiko Okabe on drums. A day after holding a secret live, they had their first concert on June 29. Their self-titled first album and an acoustic version were released simultaneously on July 1, and guitarist Tomoyuki Kuroda joined in August. In 1995, the band began using the abbreviation D.T.R and Taiji began spelling his stage name as "沢田大司", which is pronounced the same as his real name. The band simultaneously released their second album, Daring Tribal Roar, and the double A-side single "Chain (Kizuna)/I Believe..." on May 25, 1995, and were joined by keyboardist Kenji Shimizu on July 4.

Also in 1995, Taiji formed the short-lived supergroup Kings, with Shuichi Aoiki (Night Hawks) on vocals, Luke Takamura (Seikima-II) on guitar, and Satoshi "Joe" Miyawaki (44 Magnum, Hide with Spread Beaver) as support drummer. They released a self-titled album on November 1. D.T.R went on hiatus when Takeuchi suddenly decided to leave the band in May 1996. At the same time, Taiji's contract for the band ended while his personal life was in turmoil; his wife asked for a divorce and he became homeless, living in Ueno Park for two years. He went to his estranged mother, who gave him enough money for an apartment, but he was still suicidal. At the May 1998 funeral for Hide, he saw his former X bandmates and reconnected with Nakajima, his hairstylist and makeup artist during X and Loudness. Yoshiki arranged to meet at a later date, where he unexpectedly gave Taiji a large sum of money to have his jaw and four missing teeth fixed, which had been injured when he was beaten with a wooden stick by a stranger. Nakajima's parents took Taiji in; they did the paperwork so he could access his royalties, which had grown to a sizable amount, got him an apartment near their house, and forced him into a hospital. Resuming musical activities, he also switched back to using his real name professionally.

In 1999, Taiji began performing sessions with his friend Shu. They formed a band named Cloud Nine in June 2000. However, Taiji left on April 27, 2001 and they continued on without him. His autobiography, Uchuu o Kakeru Tomo e: Densetsu no Bando X no Sei to Shi, was published by Tokuma Shoten on April 20, 2000. It includes a CD of the song "Jungle". He then formed Otokaze (音風) in 2003 with his sister Masayo on vocals, who released a self-titled album on November 9, 2004. In 2005, Taiji badly injured the ligaments in his foot in a motorcycle accident. Masayo left Otokaze in 2006, and the group ended. D.T.R resumed activity in 2006 with former support drummer Kazuhisa "Roger" Takahashi, now an official member. However, they quickly went on an unofficial hiatus until November 2009, when Taiji announced they had disbanded due to staff embezzling money. Although, he also expressed plans to form a new D.T.R with Kuroda, with the name newly standing for "Death to Rive".

=== 2006–2011: Taiji with Heaven's, TSP, and reunion with X ===
Taiji formed another band, Taiji with Heaven's, which had their first concert on May 14, 2006. However, it would take several years before they truly began activities. In 2007, Taiji briefly returned to Cloud Nine. He was then the music director of the 2008 film Attitude, which was directed by former Color vocalist Dynamite Tommy. In December 2008, Taiji's staff announced on his blog that since September, his epilepsy and chronic strokes had worsened, that he was suffering from necrosis after a hip replacement of the femoral component on his left hip, and that on December 2, he was hospitalized again after falling and hurting his chest and throat. In 2009, he announced that he would once again be playing bass in a supergroup, The Killing Red Addiction with Dynamite Tommy on vocals, guitarist Tatsu (Gastunk) and drummer Kenzi (Kamaitachi, Anti Feminism, The Dead Pop Stars). They had their debut performance on June 22 at the Whisky a Go Go, in Los Angeles, United States. Their second performance was at Shinjuku Holiday on September 3, while their third took place at Osaka Holiday on December 29. The Killing Red Addiction released a cover of Gastunk's "Devil" on iTunes on January 13, 2010.

Taiji with Heaven's released their self-titled mini-album on January 13, 2010. The lineup of Taiji on bass, Dai on vocals, Ryutaro on guitar and Takanari on drums had their first concert that March. They performed a show in Korea in June and later announced plans for further activities in the country the following year. However, these were eventually cancelled due to the 2011 Tōhoku earthquake and tsunami.

Taiji had formed yet another band in April 2010, TSP (Taiji & Shu Project), with Taiji on bass, guitarist Shu (Cloud Nine, Crazy Quarter Mile), vocalist Dai (Taiji with Heaven's) and drummer Hina (Crazy Quarter Mile). On August 12, Taiji reunited with Yoshiki and Toshi at a press conference, to announce that he would be performing with X Japan as a guest at their August 14 and 15 shows at Nissan Stadium in Yokohama. He joined the band on stage for the first time in 18 and a half years, performing the song "X" both nights alongside his replacement Heath. According to Taiji's fiancée, the reunion was facilitated by Dynamite Tommy. On October 9, it was announced that Dai was leaving TSP, and would be replaced by Hiroshi "Tazz" Maruki, which resulted in their debut album being delayed. A TSP show on December 5, 2010, would turn out to be Taiji's last concert. On January 23, 2011, guitarist Ryutaro left Taiji with Heaven's, and on February 17, it was announced that they were dropping the apostrophe from their name. Also in February 2011, "Rest in Peace", TSP's first recording and Taiji's last, was featured on a CD included in an issue of the music magazine We Rock.

== Personal life and health ==
Taiji had two children; a daughter named Juria (珠梨愛) and a son named Ryuji (竜侍). The lyrics to several D.T.R songs are credited to Juria, although Taiji was the actual author. For example, he wrote "First Small Song" while recalling how he felt when she, his first child, was born. (Note: Although the version of "First Small Song" released on Dirty Trashroad ~ Acoustic is instrumental, the album's liner notes include lyrics for the song.) Taiji's wife asked him for a divorce around 1996. In his autobiography, Taiji admitted to being suicidal during the subsequent two years where he was homeless, relating how he jumped into a river at one point, before changing his mind and swimming ashore. Taiji began dating ballerina Tomomi Akatsuka (赤塚友美) in spring 2009. After the two became engaged, Akatsuka quit the ballet company she worked at to care for Taiji, who suffered from many physical and mental illnesses. According to her, he had been medically diagnosed with borderline personality disorder, dissociative identity disorder, panic disorder and epilepsy. Akatsuka wrote that Taiji had an alternate personality that would sometimes self-harm by cutting his wrists, chest or neck. He had developed narcolepsy in his thirties, and also suffered from collagen disease and auditory and visual hallucinations.

== Arrest and death ==
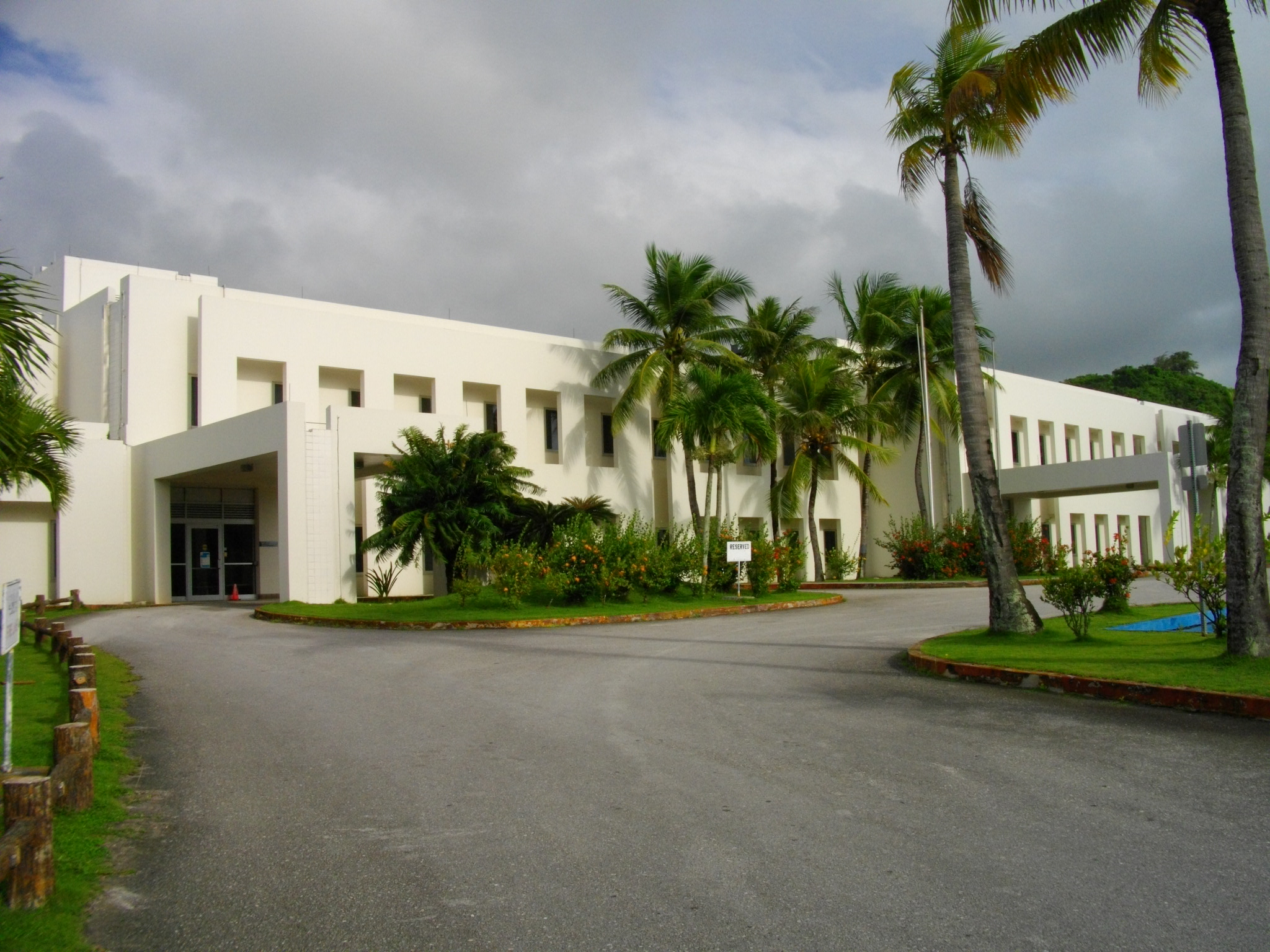
Taiji died at the Commonwealth Health Center in Saipan.

On July 11, 2011, Taiji was arrested in Saipan for an incident that took place on Delta Air Lines Flight 298. During the flight's final approach from Japan to Saipan, a flight attendant said she heard loud noises and banging coming from business class, where she saw a female passenger with her arms wrapped around Taiji as he was kicking, yelling and throwing his body against the window. Although not mentioned in media reports at the time, this female passenger was Taiji's manager, with whom he was traveling, and the two had had an argument before the outburst. Taiji was restrained by other passengers and moved to another seat, but Taiji continued to act aggressive and belligerent. The flight attendant said that she was kicked by Taiji several times. After the flight landed in Saipan, Taiji faced federal charges by the United States District Court for the Northern Mariana Islands for interfering with the performance of a flight crew.

On the night of July 14, Taiji was discovered in a detention cell, hanging with a bed sheet. He was admitted to an intensive care unit at Saipan's Commonwealth Health Center, where he was observed to be brain dead. He was later put on life support. Taiji was pronounced dead at 11 am on July 17, at the age of 45, after his mother and Akatsuka made the decision to remove him from life support.

According to Akatsuka, there were many suspicious circumstances regarding Taiji's death, such as the lack of strangulation marks on his neck, the fact that no autopsy was performed, and that the hospital lost his medical records. In the fall of 2011, Akatsuka filed a criminal complaint against Taiji's manager for attempted fraud, alleging she used Taiji's mobile phone without his permission and impersonated him while sending several emails to Akatsuka asking her to transfer money into the manager's bank account. She also claimed that the manager sent further emails impersonating Taiji to his friends immediately after his suicide attempt that concealed facts of his arrest and suicide and which alleged Taiji had had a fight with Akatsuka. In 2013, Akatsuka opened a petition on Change.org, titled "The Voiceless Truth", calling for an investigation into his death and for improvements in the way in which incidents involving Japanese nationals abroad are handled. She details the final days of the musician and her investigation into his death in her 2015 book, Taiji: Sawada Taiji.

== Posthumous and legacy ==
TSP completed and released their first album, The Last Resistance of the Firebird, on September 26, 2012. Taiji plays on four of its songs, and those who preordered the album received a bonus CD that features two demo tracks he also plays on. To commemorate what would have been Taiji's 50th birthday, an event titled "TAIJI 50th from Beyond" was held from July 9–12, 2016, at Akasaka J Rock Cafe, a favorite restaurant of the bassist. In addition to displaying his instruments, costumes and other memorabilia, demo recordings and unreleased footage were also exhibited. TSP, now known as Tribal Scream of Phoenix, released the compilation album Vol. 1 on October 10, 2018. Taiji appears on five tracks, including "Bells of Hell", a rearrangement of a previously unreleased song, and the album also includes "Freeze", which he composed but does not play on. Since his death, X Japan have introduced Taiji as a member of the band at their concerts. They utilized a hologram of the musician when they performed at Coachella in April 2018.

In 2018, Taiji took first place in the bassist category of We Rock magazine's "Metal General Election", where readers and professional musicians voted on the best musicians in the history of hard rock and heavy metal. Sugizo called Taiji a "one-of-a-kind, overwhelmingly talented musician" and a "beloved rock and roller whose life was full of ups and downs." Masayoshi Yamashita of Loudness said he was undoubtedly one of Japan's leading rock bassists and an "incredibly talented artist with the soul of rock". Tetsuya Karasuma, editor-in-chief of the music website Barks, described him as a rare bassist who had outstanding technique and sensibility, and noted him to also be a highly skilled guitarist, which gave him great versatility as he was able to play both in the spotlight and behind the scenes supporting a band. Discussing two of Taiji's X compositions, Karasuma wrote that "Desperate Angel" gave the band a new charm with its "unprecedented grandeur and mid-tempo", and called "Voiceless Screaming" a superb ballad that brought tears to the eyes of many at live performances.

Gota Nishidera described the three-dimensional arrangements of X songs when Taiji was in the band as innovative, and praised his acoustic guitar playing on "Voiceless Screaming". Bassists such as Ni~ya (Nightmare), Daiki (Deviloof), Kazuhiro Nakamata (Downy) and Takumi Fuji (Marcy) have cited Taiji as an influence. Yuki (Jabberloop) and You+, Taiji's replacement in TSP, both started playing bass because of Taiji. Bull Zeichen 88 guitarist Sebastian has stated that Taiji was the reason he became a musician, Asterism guitarist Hal-ca cited him as one of the best bassists, and Aura vocalist Redz has also expressed admiration for him.

== Discography ==
- "Jungle" (April 20, 2000)

Came with Taiji's autobiography titled Uchuu o Kakeru Tomo e: Densetsu no Bando X no Sei to Shi.

- "Rain Song" (December 20, 2000)

Came with a photobook titled Photograph.

With Dementia

- Dementia Live! (June 1985)

With X

- Vanishing Vision (1988), Oricon Peak Position: #19
- Blue Blood (1989) #6
- Jealousy (1991) #1

With Loudness

- "Black Widow" (May 25, 1992) #30
- Loudness (June 10, 1992) #2
- "Slaughter House" (August 25, 1992) #40
- Once and for All (April 25, 1993) #48

With D.T.R

- Dirty Trashroad (July 1, 1994) #13
- Dirty Trashroad ~ Acoustic (July 1, 1994) #18
- "Chain (Kizuna)/I Believe..." (CHAIN＜絆＞/I BELIEVE．．．; May 25, 1995)
- Daring Tribal Roar (May 25, 1995) #35
- Drive To Revolution (August 1, 1996, live and remix compilation album)
- "Wisdom/Lucifer" (November 10, 2007)

With Kings

- "Misty Eyes" (October 25, 1995)
- Kings (November 1, 1995) #36

With Cloud Nine

- "Bastard" (November 2000)
- "1st Demonstration" (February 2001)
- Hard 'N' Heavy Religion 2 (February 14, 2008, with the song "Hells Rage")

Various artists compilation album in Vol. 3 of We Rock magazine.

- Hard 'N' Heavy 2010 (February 13, 2010, with the song "Bastard")

Various artists compilation album in Vol. 15 of We Rock magazine.

With Otokaze

- Otokaze (November 9, 2004)

With The Killing Red Addiction

- "Devil" (January 13, 2010)

With Taiji with Heaven's

- Taiji with Heaven's (February 13, 2010)
- Hard 'N' Heavy 2010 (February 13, 2010, with the song "Keep the Faith")

Various artists compilation album in Vol. 15 of We Rock magazine.

- Hard 'N' Heavy Religion 2012 (February 14, 2012, with the song "Killer")

Various artists compilation album in Vol. 27 of We Rock magazine.

- The Virgin (February 28, 2015)

With TSP

- Hard 'N' Heavy Religion 2011 (May 14, 2011, with the song "Rest in Peace")

Various artists compilation album in Vol. 21 of We Rock magazine.

- Hard 'N' Heavy Religion 2012 (February 14, 2012, composed "Freeze")

Various artists compilation album in Vol. 27 of We Rock magazine.

- Mad Cluster (June 6, 2012)
- The Last Resistance of the Firebird (September 26, 2012)

=== Other work ===
- The Inner Gates (Baki, December 16, 1989, bass on "Taste of Flower", "A Kiss in the Storm" and "Flying")
- Cozy Powell Forever (Various artists, September 19, 1998, bass on "Kill the King")
- Vol. 21 of Rockin 'f magazine (June 14, 2006)

Various artists compilation DVD, features an interview with Taiji, rehearsal and other footage.

- Vol. 24 of Rockin 'f magazine (December 14, 2006)

Various artists compilation DVD, features an interview, studio rehearsal and live footage of D.T.R.

- Genki Desu ka! (Atsushi Onita with Kixx and Cry, June 25, 2008, producer, composed "Kixx and Cry")
- Attitude the Original Soundtrack -Fuck the System- (July 2008, music director for the movie)
- Higuchi Munetaka Tsuitō Live 2009: Munetaka Higuchi Forever Our Hero (July 14, 2010, concert DVD, bass on "Black Widow" and "Pray for the Dead")
- Vol. 17 of We Rock magazine (December 14, 2010)

Various artists compilation DVD, features an interview with Taiji and Dai from Taiji with Heaven's, and live performances of "Black Vampire" and "Freeze" by TSP from April 24, 2010.

- Legend of Phoenix (December 14, 2011)

Tribute DVD to Taiji in Vol. 26 of We Rock magazine, composed of various footage of his bands from 2000 to 2011, mostly those included within issues of Rockin 'f and We Rock.

- Everlasting Higuchi Munetaka 2010: Higuchi Munetaka Tsuitō Live Vol. 2 (February 8, 2012, concert DVD)
