= Toshi (musician) =

Japanese singer (born 1965)

Toshi 出山 利三
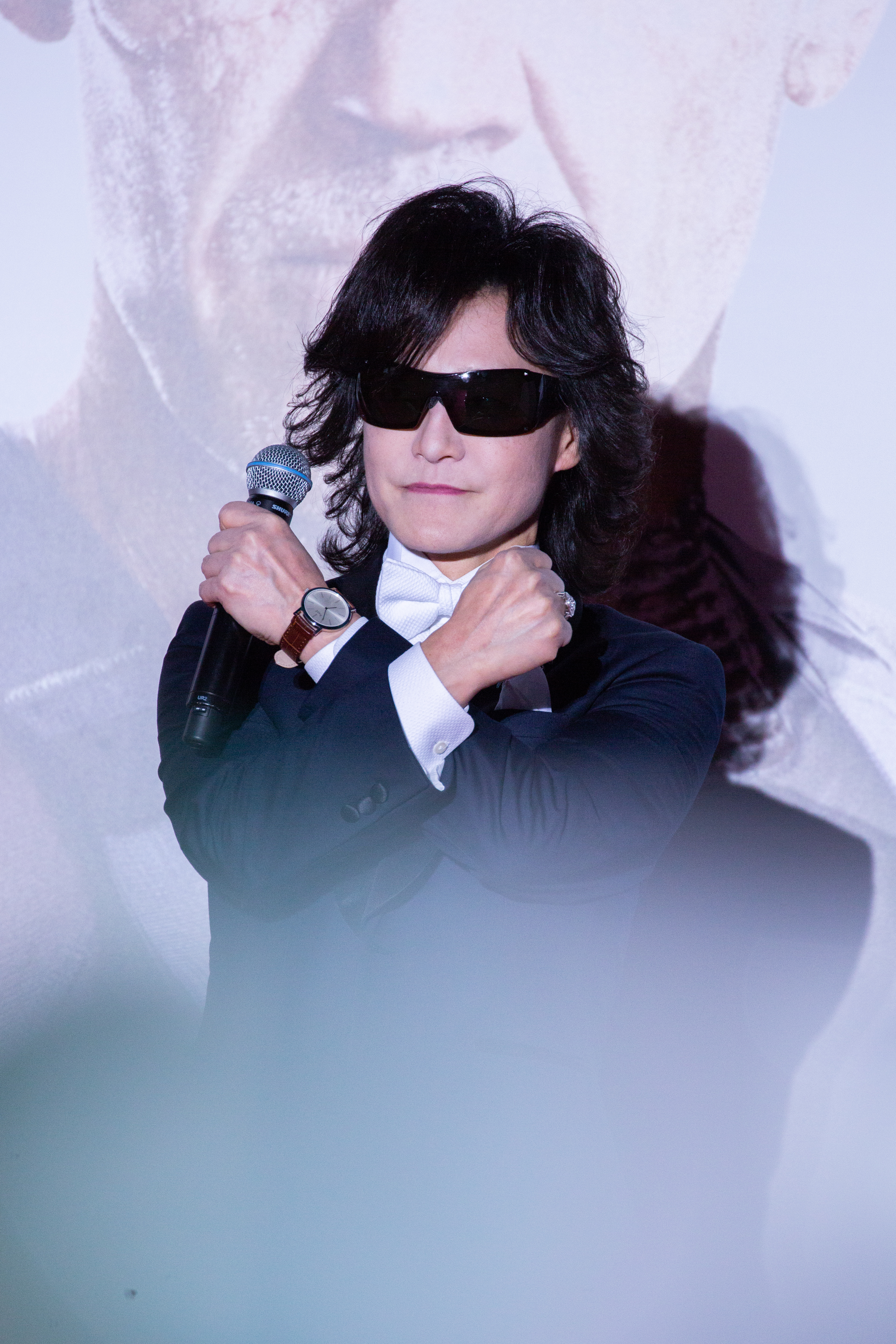
- Toshi in 2018

Background information
- Also known as: Toshi; Ryugen Toshi (龍玄とし)
- Born: Toshimitsu Deyama; October 10, 1965 (age 61); Tateyama, Japan
- Genres: Rock; heavy metal; pop
- Occupations: Singer; songwriter; record producer
- Instrument: Vocals
- Years active: 1977–present
- Labels: BMG Victor; Home of Heart; Office Samurai Japan; Universal
- Member of: X Japan
- Formerly of: Toshl feat. Yoshiki; Toshi with T-Earth; Toshi with Night Hawks; Dynamite; Noise
- Website: toshi-samuraijapan.com

Japanese name
- Kanji: 出山 利三
- Hiragana: でやま としみつ
Transcriptions
- Romanization: Deyama Toshimitsu

Toshimitsu Deyama (Japanese: 出山 利三, Hepburn: Deyama Toshimitsu; born October 10, 1965), known exclusively by his stage name Toshi, (Note: Currently stylized as Toshl (with a lowercase L) and previously in all capital letters.) is a Japanese singer and songwriter who is the lead vocalist and a co-founder of the rock band X Japan, who rose to prominence in the late 1980s and early 1990s and is credited as founders of the visual kei movement. Toshi began an extensive solo career in 1992 before leaving X Japan at the end of 1997. Toshi said he was "brainwashed" by a group called Home of Heart, whose leader would control his musical output for the next 12 years. In 2007, X Japan reunited and began a world tour. Toshi severed ties with Home of Heart in January 2010 and renewed his solo career. In January 2018, he began to use the stage name Ryugen Toshi (龍玄とし, Ryūgen Toshi). In 2018, readers and professional musicians voted Toshi the best vocalist in the history of hard rock and heavy metal in We Rock magazine's "Metal General Election". His distinctive, impassioned tenor vocals have been compared to those of Steve Perry.

== Career ==
=== 1982–1993: X Japan ===
In 1977, Toshi and his childhood friend Yoshiki formed a band called Dynamite in their hometown of Tateyama, Chiba, when they were just 11 years old. The group changed its name to Noise in 1978, while they were still in high school. At this time Toshi was a guitar player, but following the departure of their vocalist, Toshi was selected for the position after being deemed the best singer remaining in the group. In 1982, Noise disbanded and Yoshiki and Toshi formed a new band, naming it X while they tried to think of another name, but the name stuck. X began to actively perform in the Tokyo area in 1985 with a frequently changing lineup. They released their first album, Vanishing Vision, in 1988 through Yoshiki's own Extasy Records and toured extensively in support of the record. They would become one of the first Japanese acts to achieve mainstream success while on an independent label, and were later widely credited as one of the pioneers of visual kei.

X's major label debut album, Blue Blood, was released in April 1989 and debuted at number six on the Oricon chart. Its success earned the band the "Grand Prix New Artist of the Year" award at the 4th annual Japan Gold Disc Awards in 1990. Their third album, Jealousy, was released in 1991 and debuted at number one, selling over 600,000 copies. It was later certified at one million by the RIAJ. Shortly after the release of 1993's Art of Life, which also topped the Oricon chart, the members of X Japan took a break to start solo projects.

=== 1992–2007: Solo career, Home of Heart, and leaving X ===
Toshi started his solo career in 1992 on BMG Victor with Made in Heaven, which reached number three on the Oricon chart. His eldest brother was given the job of his manager. However, after several incidents, Toshi gave him a sum of money to quit. His new manager, who also became connected with the management of X Japan, was fired after large sums of money went missing from both offices. During the early 1990s, he started working with renowned American vocal coach Roger Love, who has been his coach ever since.

In 1993, Toshi starred in a musical adaptation of Hamlet as the title character. The role of Ophelia was performed by Kaori Moritani, whom he would marry four years later on February 17, 1997. She played a large part in Toshi becoming disenchanted with performing in a rock band.

His next two albums, Mission (1994) and Grace (1995), also reached the top five on the Oricon chart. Dahlia, which would become X Japan's last album, was released in November 1996 and once again reached the number one spot.

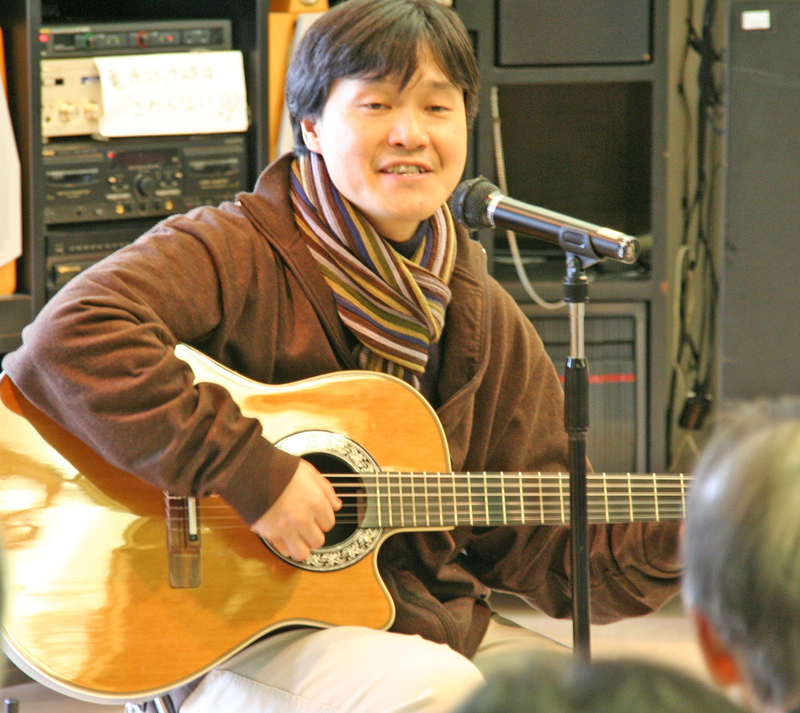
Toshi at a solo acoustic show in 2005

In August 1997 Toshi first saw a concert of Tōru Kurabuchi, better known as Masaya, a musician and the leader of an organization called Home of Heart (formerly known as Lemuria Island, and later as Healing World). Toshi was emotionally touched by Masaya's "healing music" or new-age music, which Kaori introduced him to, and the two became friends. His wife, connection with Masaya, and participation in Home of Heart all became the source of many disagreements with his other older brother, who had become his manager in March 1995.

On September 22, 1997, it was announced that Toshi had decided to leave X Japan. They performed their farewell show at the Tokyo Dome on December 31. In September 1998, the magazine Shūkan Gendai published several stories claiming Toshi was brainwashed by Home of Heart, selling their music and other products, and being used as a spokesman. Toshi would later confirm these claims in his autobiography, but at the time refuted them and explained that his decision to leave X Japan dated back as far as April 1996, more than a year before he met Masaya, and that the glamorous, success-oriented life of a rock star failed to satisfy him emotionally, as opposed to a simpler life and career. Other media picked up the story, forcing Toshi and Masaya to give interviews where they blamed Toshi's brother and management for fabricating the stories. When transcripts of a telephone conversation were published, a search found wiretaps at Toshi's house and Home of Heart's office.

In October 1998, Toshi's management company underwent changes and came to be run by Masaya and Kaori. This was a violation of his recording contract, resulting in him being let go from BMG and having to pay a large fee. From that point onwards, Toshi's musical output was written and produced by Masaya and released through Home of Heart and their label Healing World. He embarked on extensive touring, traveling across Japan to perform acoustic concerts for small audiences. According to their website, his Utatabi (詩旅（うたたび) concert tour, which began in 1999, performed over 3,000 shows by 2007. In April 2004, Home of Heart was brought up on charges of child abuse by Masaki Kito. Toshi and his office were involved in the court cases. In April, Toshi was sued for defaming Kito after he made statements about the accusations. In May, he then sued Kito for defamation and obstruction of business. Toshi was ultimately cleared of charges in the child abuse case without suspicion.

=== 2007–2010: X Japan reunion and leaving Home of Heart ===
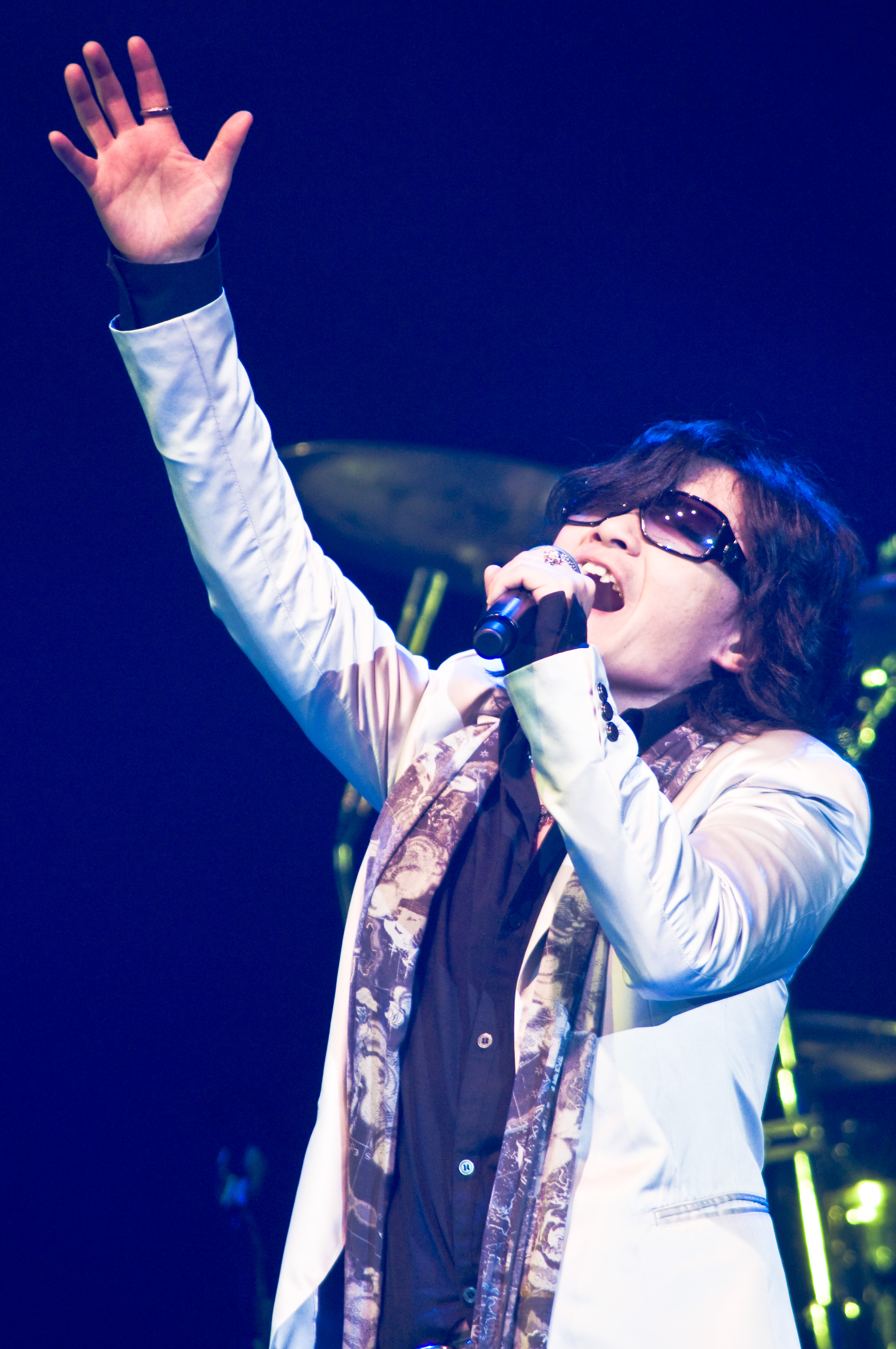
Toshi performing with T-Earth in Brazil 2008

According to a report by the newspaper Sponichi, Toshi visited Yoshiki in Los Angeles in November 2006 to work on the song "Without You" as a tribute to former X Japan guitarist Hide, who died in 1998. In March 2007, Toshi announced on his website that he and Yoshiki had recently resumed working together, stating that a "new project" would commence soon. Rumors of a X Japan reunion subsequently began, and in June Yoshiki was reported as having expressed interest in a tour (beginning in Los Angeles), "Without You" being released as a single and that he was in talks with Heath and Pata regarding their participation. On October 22, 2007, X Japan announced their reunion and released the Saw IV theme song, "I.V.".

With X Japan's restart came a restart of Toshi's solo activities. On June 11, 2008, his new band Toshi with T-Earth was announced, with a line-up of Phantasmagoria guitarist Jun, and guitarist Touya and bassist Ruka from the band Charlotte. For their live shows they would switch between La'cryma Christi's drummer Levin and Luna Sea's drummer Shinya. Their first album Earth Spirit was released on August 8, they dubbed their music "eco hard rock", as the reason for starting the band was to draw attention to the environment. In October, T-Earth performed two shows in South America, in Chile and Brazil. Their second album Haruka Naru Toki o Koete, was released on November 26.

In April 2009, it was announced that 13-year-old drummer Riku, would be joining the group and that anyone who wanted to could apply to join, the only requirement was "people who want to save the Earth". In July, 18-year-old guitarist Ryo and 24-year-old bassist Kain officially joined the band. On August 13, they released an album in 2 versions: Hontou no Ai and its English version, Truth.

On January 18, 2010, Toshi filed a lawsuit against his record company Home of Heart, accusing them of claiming all of his income over the past 12 years, eventually forcing him to announce bankruptcy. Effectively severing ties with the company and its leader Masaya. He also divorced his wife Kaori Moritani in February of the same year, who had also been working for Home of Heart, Ltd. Toshi even disclosed how they "effectively have not been husband and wife" saying: "Aside from having met her occasionally related to work, I do not know anything about her actual life." Toshi also claims that she had been living with Masaya for the past 10 years.

=== 2010–present: Renewed solo career ===
On February 8, Toshi opened a new official website, which announced that he would release one last mini album, entitled Samurai Japan, on February 24. His stage name is now written as Toshl. The songs were completely composed and produced by Toshi and feature X Japan's Pata and Sugizo. His "last solo concert" was on February 24, which he performed with X Japan's members as guest musicians.

On November 22, Toshi announced the first performance of his new project, entitled Toshl feat. Yoshiki, would be held on January 24 and 25, 2011. It was a high-end dinner show, where the attendees were served a French meal by renowned chef Mikuni Kiyomi, and enjoyed a piano duet by Toshi and Yoshiki, an orchestra was also utilized. It was also announced that the duo would release their first songs earlier that month.

In response to the 2011 Tōhoku earthquake and tsunami that occurred in Japan on March 11, Toshi performed eight concerts throughout western Japan. All of the shows were acoustic due to the electricity shortage and featured X Japan's Heath, Luna Sea's Shinya and the Orchestra Ensemble Kanazawa. All proceeds were donated to the Japanese Red Cross to aid the victims. On June 22, Toshi released two songs, "Hoshizora no Neptune" and "Haru no Negai", as digital downloads that are available overseas. It was announced that Toshi had joined European record label Bishi Bishi in September 2011.

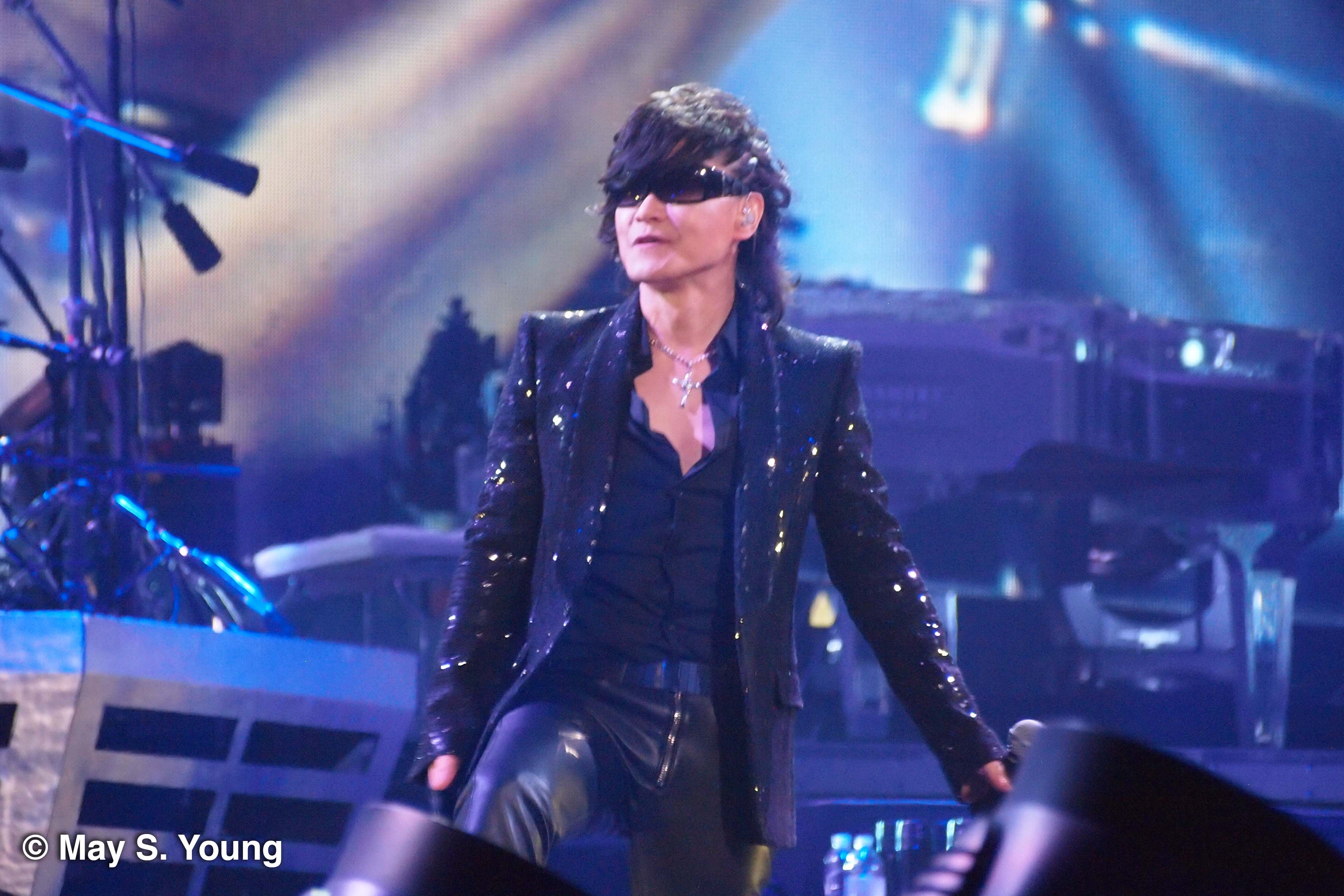
Toshi with X Japan at Madison Square Garden in 2014

On March 27, 2013, Toshi released his first full-length album since restarting his solo career, Cherry Blossom. The single "Love is Maria" was also released that day, both are available worldwide in 111 countries. His next album Crystal Rock Chapter 1-3 was released on June 12.

Toshi released the book Brainwash ~Comeback from 12 Years of Hell~ (洗脳 ～地獄の12年からの生還～, Sennō ~Jigoku no 12-nen Kara no Seikan~) on July 23, 2014, which talks about his leaving X Japan, being "brainwashed" via violence and abuse, reuniting with X and going bankrupt. On August 25, he held a special concert at Zepp Diver City where he was supported by a one-off band consisting of Kei (baroque), Yuu (Merry), Akinori (lynch.) and Shinya of Dir En Grey. Toshi collaborated with Sukekiyo, singing on the track "Ameagari no Yūshi" included with the limited edition of their 2015 mini album Vitium.

In 2016, Toshi became sound producer for Fuji TV's game company Fuji Games. He created "Crystal Memories" as the theme song for their 2017 smartphone video game Ordinal Strata. In 2018, Toshi made his voice acting debut in the game voicing a version of himself. He also collaborated with hip-hop artist AK-69 on the rapper's digital single "Brave". On September 3, he released a food book titled Sweets Memory, Gâteau Chocolate (スイーツメモリー ガトーショコラ ダァ, Suītsu Memorī Gatō Shokorada). In September, it was announced that Toshi had signed with Universal Music Group, where he would release a cover album titled Im a Singer on November 28. It was his first album to be released on a major record label in 20 years. A second cover album, Im a Singer Vol. 2, was released on December 4, 2019.

In 2019, Toshi made an appearance as a guest artist at the annual touring ice show Fantasy on Ice. His opening performance of "A Cruel Angel's Thesis" from the anime series Neon Genesis Evangelion in Kobe and Toyama attracted international media attention. Also notable was his live music collaboration with figure skater and two-time Olympic champion Yuzuru Hanyu to his songs "Masquerade" and "Crystal Memories". Toshi wrote "Be Alright", which was released digitally in April 2020, to be the theme song of the TV drama Guilty: Kono Koi wa Tsumi Desu ka?. In addition to marking the first time he wrote for a drama, it was also his first original song released on a major record label in 22 years.

Im a Singer Vol. 3 was released on September 28, 2022. Unlike Toshi's two previous cover albums, it features an original composition, "Hazakura", and a duet with Kanji Ishimaru. Toshi returned the favor in 2024, dueting with Ishimaru on "Dai Tokai" for his album With Friends. Toshi provided a cover of "Ai o Torimodose!!" to be the ending theme song of the 2026 anime adaptation of Fist of the North Star. It is included on Im a Singer Vol. 4, which was released on July 1, 2026. While predominately focused on anime song covers such as "Guren no Yumiya", which features Hisashi on guitar, "Moonlight Densetsu" and "Mixed Nuts", the album also includes three original compositions; "Unmei no Senkō", "Kirameki wa Kaze" and "Buchikamase".

== Discography ==
=== As Toshl ===
Albums

- Cherry Blossom (March 27, 2013)
- Crystal Rock Chapter 1-3 (June 12, 2013)
- Crystal Rock Chapter 1-3 English Ver. (August 7, 2013)
- Im a Singer (November 28, 2018, cover album), Oricon Albums Chart Peak Position: #4, Billboard Japan Hot Albums Peak Position: #4
- Im a Singer Vol. 2 (December 4, 2019, cover album) #8, #11
- Im a Singer Vol. 3 (September 28, 2022, cover album) #12, #13
- Im a Singer Vol. 4 (July 1, 2026, cover album) #41

Mini-albums

- Samurai Japan (武士JAPAN) (February 24, 2010)
- Live Samurai Japan (Live武士JAPAN) (October 10, 2011, live album)
- Samurai Japan English Ver. (March 11, 2012, worldwide digital: July 3, 2013)

Singles

- "Otoko no Pride" (December 27, 2010, fan-club only)
- "Crystal Piano no Kimi" (クリスタルピアノのキミ) (January 24, 2011, Toshl feat. Yoshiki, CD and DVD)
- "Hoshizora no Neptune" (星空のネプチューン) (June 22, 2011, digital download)
- "Haru no Negai" (春の願い) (June 22, 2011, digital download)
- "Haru no Negai/I'll Be Your Love" (August 18, 2011, Toshl feat. Yoshiki, sold at concert only)
- "Kokoro no Naka wa Itsumo Red" (October 10, 2011, fan-club only)
- "Love is Maria" (March 27, 2013)
- "Mirai o Eye Shiteru" (未来をＥＹＥしてる) (June 18, 2014)
- "Gunjō no Yūgure" (群青の夕紅れ) (March 25, 2015)
- "Be All Right" (April 3, 2020, digital download)

DVDs

- Toshl feat. Yoshiki Special Concert Luxury Box Set (June 25, 2011, Toshl feat. Yoshiki, 4 DVDs and CD)
- Live Samurai Japan Special DVD Box (January 15, 2012, 4 DVDs and CD)
- Live Crystal Rock (April 29, 2015, DVD)
- Ma Natsunoyo Toshl Rock Matsuri (魔夏の夜Toshlロック祭り) (January 7, 2016, DVD)

=== As Toshi ===
Albums

- Made in Heaven (November 21, 1992) #3
- Mission (June 11, 1994) #3
- Grace (March 29, 1995) #5
- Aoi Hoshi no Tabibito (蒼い宇宙の旅人) (January 22, 1997) #15
- Canary (April 22, 1998, with Taro Hakase) #36
- Toward the Way ~Aratanaru Michi e~ (Toward the way ～新たなる道へ～) (December 25, 1999)
- Utatabi ~Utsukushi Machi e~ (詩旅〜美しき町へ) (December 4, 2004)
- Earth Spirit (August 8, 2008, Toshi with T-Earth) #300
- Haruka Naru Toki o Koete (遥かなる時をこえて) (November 26, 2008, Toshi with T-Earth)
- Hontou no Ai (本当の愛) (August 13, 2009, Toshi with T-Earth)
- Truth (August 13, 2009, Toshi with T-Earth, English version of Hontou no Ai)

Singles and mini-albums

- "Made in Heaven" (October 21, 1992) #2
- "Looming ~Tashikametai~" (Looming 〜確かめたい〜) (May 21, 1993, with Night Hawks) #12
- "Paradise" (September 8, 1993, with Night Hawks) #5
- "Always ~Tsutaetai~" (Always 〜伝えたい〜) (December 1, 1993, with Night Hawks) #9
- "My Treasure" (December 16, 1993) #13
- "Bless You" (May 18, 1994) #10
- "Naite Iru no Wa" (泣いているのは) (July 6, 1997, with Night Hawks)
- "Sayonara no Kisetsu ni..." (さよならの季節に…) (December 16, 1994) #21
- "Asphalt Jungle " (March 15, 1995) #14
- "Morning Glory" (August 7, 1996) #22
- "Hoshi no Butoukai" (星の舞踏会) (January 8, 1997) #28
- "Hana ~Inochi no Mebae~" (HANA 〜いのちの芽ばえ〜) (April 24, 1997) #65
- "Natural High" (November 21, 1997, with Taro Hakase)
- "Sayonara" (さようなら) (April 1, 1998) #47
- "Kimi wa Inaika" (君はいないか) (July 23, 1998) #35
- "Ai no Uta o Utaitai" (愛の詩をうたいたい) (March 25, 1999)
- "Beautiful Love Song" (March 25, 1999, English version of "Ai no Uta wo Utaitai")
- "Inochi..." (June 30, 2000)
- "Jibun ~Daite Yaritai~" (自分 〜抱いてやりたい〜) (April 30, 2001)
- "Perfect Love" (November 30, 2002)
- "Ame no Naka no Ano hi no Boku" (雨の中のあの日の僕) (February 24, 2004)
- "Sekai ga Hitotsu de Areba (Orchestra Version)" (世界がひとつであれば (Orchestra Version)) (May 25, 2004)
- "Sekai ga Hitotsu de Areba (Acoustic Version)" (世界がひとつであれば (Acoustic Version)) (May 25, 2004)
- "Earth in the Dark ~Aozora ni Mukatte~" (EARTH IN THE DARK 〜青空に向かって〜) (April 1, 2008) #118
- "Seiki ~Jidai~" (世紀 〜JIDAI〜) (July 25, 2008)
- "Beautiful World" (July 25, 2008)
- "Pain" (March 15, 2009, English versions, includes T-Earth songs)
- "Taisetsuna Mono" (大切なもの) (April 8, 2009)
- "Utsukushii Sora o Kudasai" (美しい空をください) (June 10, 2009)
- "Itsumademo" (いつまでも) (August 13, 2009, feat Wanku)
- "Arigatou no Uta" (ありがとうのうた) (September 11, 2009)
- "Chikyuu Mada Arimasu ka" (地球はまだありますか) (December 19, 2009, Toshi with T-Earth)

Duet albums

- Toshi Duet I ~Eien ni Tabi Suru Koto~ (Toshi DUET I 〜永久に旅すること〜) (September 30, 2008, with Tierra and Kaori Moritani)
- Daichi o Shizumete (大地をしずめて) (April 8, 2009, Toshi & Wanku)

Live album

- Live is Best (June 21, 1997)

Compilation albums

- Single Selection: Sacrifice (June 24, 1998) #90
- Healing ~Ai no Uta o Utaitai~ (愛の詩をうたいたい) (February 25, 2008)
- Best I ~Ai no Uta o Utaitai~ (BEST I 〜愛の詩をうたいたい) (March 25, 2008)
- Best II ~Perfect Love~ (March 25, 2008)

Home videos

- Toshi ~Prelude~ Made in Heaven (February 24, 1993)
- Grace Live (June 21, 1995)
- Aoi Hoshi no Tabibito (February 24, 1997)
- Live Spring to Your Heart ~Aoi Hoshi no Tabibito~ (April 23, 1997)
- Toshi with T-Earth 2Days Final Live in Tokyo (February 25, 2008)
- Toshi with T-Earth Summer Live in Akasaka Blitz (November 25, 2009)
- Toshi & Wanku Summer Live in Akasaka Blitz (November 25, 2009)
- Toshi Zenshuu (February 1, 2010, CD and DVD)
- Toshi & Wanku Duet Zenshuu (February 8, 2010, CD and DVD)
- Toshi with T-Earth Zenshuu (February 12, 2010, CD and DVD)
- 2008 Toshi Collection (March 5, 2010, CD and DVD)
- 2009 Toshi Collection (March 5, 2010, CD and DVD)

=== Other work ===
- The Inner Gates (Baki, December 16, 1989, backing vocals on "Kingdom of Heaven" and "Flying")
- Shake Hand (L.O.X, June 25, 1990, lyrics and lead vocals for "Daydream" and "Tragedy of M")
- Rock Love (Tatsu, September 1992, guest vocalist)
- The Midnight Hawks (Night Hawks, June 1, 1994, produced the album and selected the songs)
- 60 Candles: A Tribute to Kayama Yuzo (April 23, 1997, cover of Yuzo Kayama's "Toki wo Koete")
- Vitium (Sukekiyo, February 4, 2015, vocals on "Ameagari no Yūshi")
- Oneness M (Sugizo, November 29, 2017, lyrics and vocals on "Phoenix ~Hinotori~")
- "Masquerade" (マスカレイド; January 12, 2018, for the TV series Maskmen)
- "Brave" (AK-69, May 14, 2018, vocals)
- Ordinal Strata: Character Songs I (August 15, 2018, produced the album, which also features three of his songs)
- Akko ga Omakase ~Akiko Wada 50th Anniversary Tribute Album~ (September 5, 2018, cover of Akiko Wada's "Shiawase no Chikara")
- The Anthem (AK-69, February 27, 2019, vocals on "Brave -Orchestra Ver.-")
- With Friends (Kanji Ishimaru, November 6, 2024, duet vocals on a cover of Crystal Kay's "Dai Tokai")
