= Yoshiki discography =

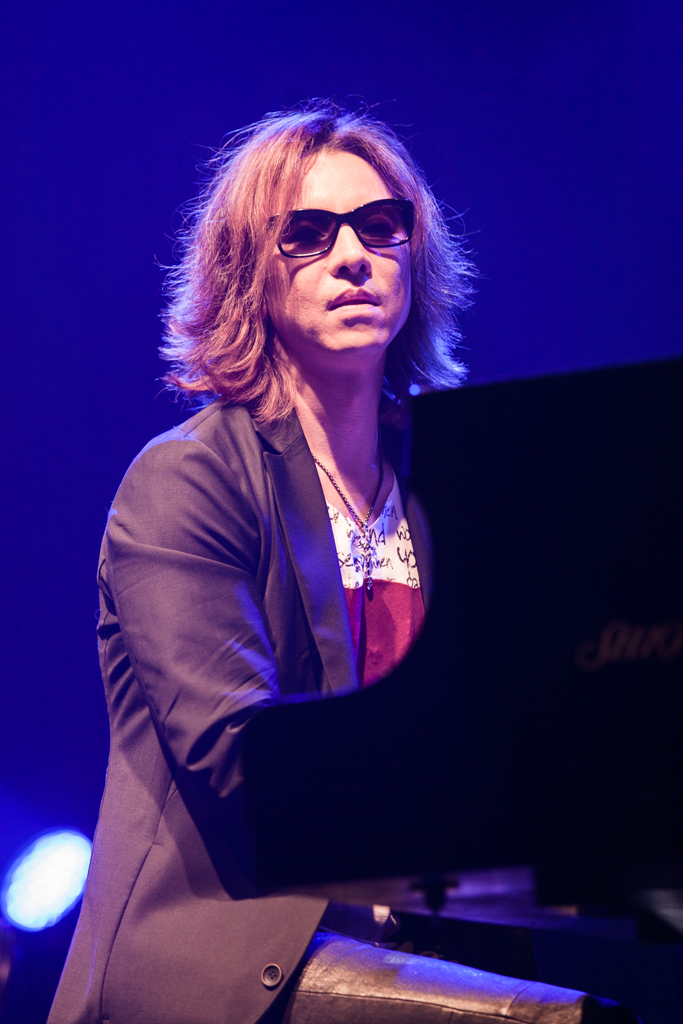
- Studio albums: 3
- Compilation albums: 3
- Singles: 3

Japanese musician Yoshiki has released 3 solo studio albums as of April 2017 and is credited as a songwriter, producer or arranger for a number of artists. Chart rankings are weekly, unless otherwise stated.

== Solo releases ==
=== Studio albums ===
Title	Album details	Peak positions	
Title	Album details	JPN	US Class.
Eternal Melody	Released: April 21, 1993; Label: Toshiba-EMI, Polydor; Format: CD	6	—
Eternal Melody II	Released: March 23, 2005; Label: Nippon Columbia; Format: CD	14	—
Yoshiki Classical	Released: August 27, 2013; Label: X Project, INgrooves, Warner Music Japan; Formats: CD, digital download	4	21

=== Compilation albums ===
Title	Album details	Peak chart positions
Title	Album details	Oricon
Yoshiki Selection	Release date: December 12, 1991	17
A Music Box For Fantasy	Release date: July 25, 1993	—
Yoshiki Selection II	Release date: November 4, 1996	17

=== Singles ===
Title	Year	Peak positions		Album
Title	Year	JPN	UK	Album
"Amethyst" (performed by the London Philharmonic Orchestra)	1993	5	—	Eternal Melody
"Foreign Sand" (with Roger Taylor)	1994	13	26	Happiness?
"Golden Globe Theme"	2013	—	—	Yoshiki Classical
"Red Swan" (feat. Hyde)	2018	4	—	Non-album single
"Forever Love (Live)" (feat. Josh Groban)	2026	—	—	Non-album single

=== Artist compilations and collaborations ===
Title	Album details
Kiss My Ass: Classic Kiss Regrooved	Release date: June 21, 1994
Tribute Spirits	Release date: May 1, 1999
Ai Chikyu-haku presents Global Harmony	Release date: March 26, 2003
Ai Chikyu-haku presents Love the Earth	Release date: March 30, 2005
#SINGFORLIFE	Release date:: March 24, 2020; Released on YouTube

=== Home videos ===
Title	Details	Peak chart positions
Title	Details	Oricon
Anniversary	Release date: May 18, 2000	—
Symphonic Concert with Tokyo City Philharmonic Orchestra feat. Violet UK	Release date: March 30, 2005	12

== Group works ==
=== Violet UK ===
Title	Details	Peak chart positions
Title	Details	Oricon
"Sex and Religion (Test Mix)"	Release date: September 22, 2005	—
"Blue Butterfly"	Release date: October 3, 2007	—
"Rosa -Movie Mix-"	Release date: April 29, 2009	—

=== L.O.X. ===
Title	Details	Peak chart positions
Title	Details	Oricon
Shake Hand	Release date: June 25, 1990; Note: all drums as Rei Shiratori	—
Tribute to Masami Kegare naki Buta-tomodachi e!! (Tribute to Masami 汚れなき豚友達へ!!)	Release date: September 20, 2002; Note: various artists; drums on "Kokoro Talk" as Rei Shiratori	—

=== V2 ===
Title	Details	Peak chart positions
Title	Details	Oricon
"Haitoku no Hitomi ~Eyes of Venus~/Virginity" (背徳の瞳 〜Eyes of Venus〜/Virginity)	Release date: January 19, 1992	2
V2 Special Live Virginity 1991.12.5	Release date: March 25, 1992; Note: DVD	—

=== Globe ===
Title	Details	Peak chart positions
Title	Details	Oricon
"Seize the Light"	Release date: November 27, 2002	8
8 Years: Many Classic Moments	Release date: November 27, 2002	2
"Get It on Now" (feat. Keiko)	Release date: March 26, 2003	35
Level 4	Release date: March 26, 2003	17

=== ToshI feat Yoshiki ===
Title	Details
"Crystal Piano no Kimi"	Release date: January 24, 2011
ToshI feat. Yoshiki Special Concert Luxury Box Set	Release date: June 25, 2011
"Haru no Negai/I'll Be Your Love"	Release date: August 18, 2011; Note: sold at concert only

== Credited work ==
=== Singles ===
Year	Single	Artist	Credit
1986	"Mystery Temptation"	Poison	Producer
1993	"Ima wo Dakishimete" (今を抱きしめて)	NOA	Lyricist, Composer, Arranger, Producer
1994	"Rain"	Glay	Lyricist, Co-composer, Arranger, Producer, Piano
1997	"Moment"	Hideki Saijo	Composer, arranger, producer
1998	"Begin"	Shōko Kitano	Lyricist, Composer, Arranger, Producer
1998	"Bara to Midori" (薔薇と緑)	Shōko Kitano	Lyricist, Composer, Arranger, Producer
1999	"Akuro no Oka"	Dir En Grey	Arranger, producer
1999	"-Zan-"	Dir En Grey	Arranger, producer
1999	"Yurameki"	Dir En Grey	Arranger, producer
1999	"Cage"	Dir En Grey	Arranger, producer
1999	"Yokan"	Dir En Grey	Arranger, producer
2000	"Pearl"	Shiro	Arranger, producer
2000	"LR-7"	Beast	Arranger, producer
2000	"Happy Driving"	Revenus	Executive producer
2000	"Chemical"	Beast	Arranger, producer
2000	"Shinku no Hana" (深紅の花)	Shizuka Kudō	Lyricist (as Tomomi Tachibana), Composer, Arranger, Producer
2000	"Tōmei na Jibun" (透明な自分)	Shiro	Producer
2001	"Sen no Hitomi" (千の瞳)	Revenus	Arranger, producer
2001	"Vision"	Beast	Executive producer
2001	"Flower"	Revenus	Arranger, Executive producer
2001	"Digital Crazy Kong"	Brain Drive	Executive producer
2001	"Lilac"	Flangers	Executive producer
2002	"Atarashii Door" (新しいドア)	Flangers	Executive producer
2002	"Acacia"	Revenus	Executive producer
2002	"Yorugoe" (よるごえ)	Pick 2 Hand	Executive producer
2003	"I'll Be Your Love"	Dahlia	Lyricist, Composer, Arranger, Producer
2004	"Scorpio"	TRAX	Composer, arranger, producer
2005	"Rhapsody"	TRAX	Lyricist, Arranger, Producer
2016	"Bara no Yoni Saite Sakura no Yoni Chitte"	Seiko Matsuda	Lyricist, Composer, Arranger, Producer
2019	"Zipang"	Hyde	Piano
2019	"Miracle (Sarah's Version)"	Sarah Brightman	Composer, piano
2020	Imitation Rain	SixTones	Songwriter, Producer
2020	#SINGFORLIFE (ft. Bono, will.i.am, Jennifer Hudson)		Co-composer
2020	"New York" feat. Yoshiki	St. Vincent	Arranger, piano
2025	"Butterfly"	Bi-ray	Lyricist, Composer, Arranger, Producer

=== Albums ===
Year	Album	Artist	Credit
1989	The Inner Gates	Baki	Piano, arranger on "In My Heart Cave"
1990	Habit of Sex	Ex-Ans	Piano on "Different Malice"
1994	Kiss My Ass: Classic Kiss Regrooved	Various Artists	Performer on "Black Diamond"
2001	Kusa Ikire (クサ イキレ)	Pick 2 Hand	Executive producer
2001	Imagination lens	Beast	Executive producer
2001	Humanistic	Abandoned Pools	Executive producer
2001	Believer	Laura Dawn	Producer on "I Would"
2001	Super Turtle Attack	Ladies Room	Executive producer
2002	Before the Beginning	Aja Daashuur	Executive producer
2002	Zerøspace	Kidneythieves	Executive producer
2002	Glory Days	Revenus	Executive producer
2002	Jewelry Box	Shizuka Kudō	Executive producer
2002	Shōwa no Kaidan Vol. 1	Shizuka Kudō	Executive producer
2003	Gain (가인)	Jo Sungmo	Composer on "Geudaeppunieoseo" (그대뿐이어서)
2004	Takarazuka Mime!	Takarazuka Revue	Composer on "Sekai no Owari no Yoru ni" (世界の終わりの夜に)
2007	Catacombs	Soundtrack	Producer
2008	Repo! The Genetic Opera	Soundtrack	Producer
2018	Hymn	Sarah Brightman	Composer and piano on "Miracle"

== Other work ==
- Remedy (Abandoned Pools, 2002, cameo appearance in music video)
- To Be the Best (Tenacious D, March 26, 2012, cameo appearance in music video)
