= Yoshiki Classical =

Studio album by Yoshiki
- Released: August 27, 2013
- Genre: Classical
- Length: 40:36
- Label: X Project, INgrooves, Warner
- Producer: Yoshiki, George Martin

Yoshiki chronology
Eternal Melody II (2005)	Yoshiki Classical (2013)

Professional ratings
Review scores
Source	Rating
AllMusic	4/5 stars

Yoshiki Classical is the third classical studio album by Japanese musician Yoshiki. It was released on August 27, 2013. The album peaked at 21st place on Billboard Top Classical Albums chart.

== Background ==
In 1993, Yoshiki recorded his first classical studio album, Eternal Melody, in London at the studios owned by English record producer Sir George Martin, who produced and co-arranged the album, with the music performed by the London Philharmonic Orchestra. It mostly included orchestral arrangements of songs from his band X Japan.

The second studio album, Eternal Melody II, was recorded in the Los Angeles County, California; in his own Extasy Recording Studio, O'Henry Sound Studios, and Paramount Pictures Scoring Stage M facility. All songs were written and composed by Yoshiki, additionally performed by Tokyo Philharmonic Orchestra.

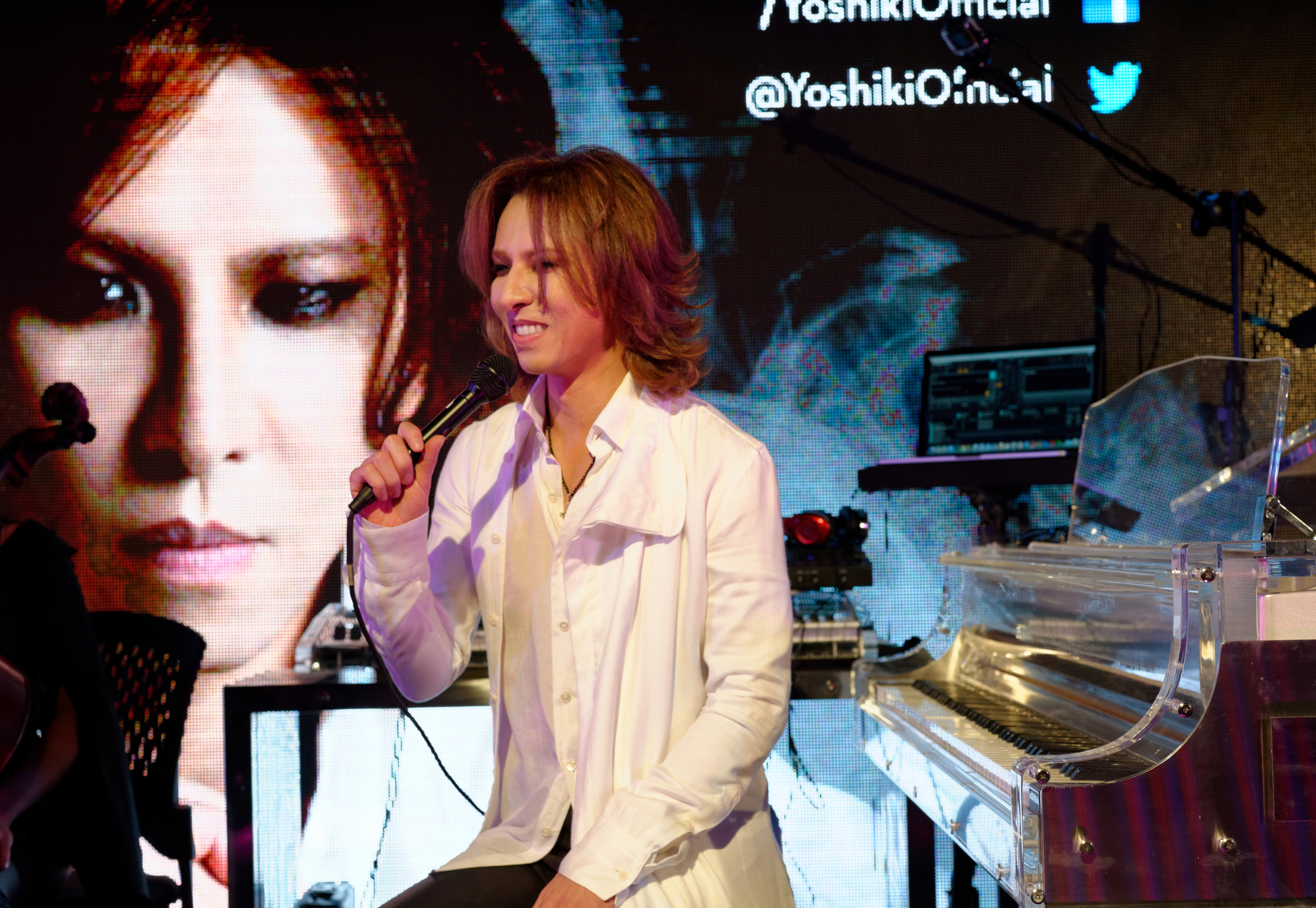
Yoshiki at the Grammy Museum in February 2014, when announced the classical world tour.

In 2012, Yoshiki composed the theme song for the 69th Golden Globe Awards, and on January 15, 2013, the theme was officially released through iTunes in 111 countries, with all proceeds being donated to charities chosen by the Hollywood Foreign Press Association. After the album release on August 27, 2013, in its celebration, a special live performance was held at the Grammy Museum.

On February 19, Yoshiki's first classical world tour was announced at the Grammy Museum. It began on April 25, 2014, in Costa Mesa, California, and continued in Mexico, Russia, Germany, France, United Kingdom, China, Thailand, Taiwan, and Japan, for a total of 13 shows in 10 countries. Due to scheduling issues, the concert at Toronto, Canada, on May 10 was postponed indefinitely. The tour setup featured Yoshiki on piano, several strings as cellos and viola, and vocalist Katie Fitzgerald from Violet UK. Performances included classical versions of songs composed by Yoshiki and other famous composers such as Beethoven and Tchaikovsky.

== Composition ==
Yoshiki Classical contains mostly previously released songs. "Amethyst" was the first orchestral song Yoshiki composed, "Red Christmas" is a song by his musical project Violet UK, while "Seize the Light" is from a group Globe, with whom Yoshiki collaborated in the early 2000s. There are three orchestral arrangements of X Japan's songs "Tears", "Forever Love", and differing on the edition, "Say Anything", or previously unreleased "The Last Song".

It includes "Anniversary", composed and performed at the request of the Japanese government at a celebration in honor of the tenth anniversary of Emperor Akihito's enthronement in 1999. Two theme songs, "I'll Be Your Love", from the World Fair Expo 2005 held in Japan, and of "Golden Globe" awards. Besides that, was included previously unreleased song "Miracle", used since 2010 as the opening intro theme song for the X Japan's concert tours.

== Release ==
The album was first released digitally in North America on August 27, 2013, via iTunes. On September 24, it was released worldwide digitally and in CD format in North America, and was also released on September 25 as a special short digital edition titled "Yoshiki Melodies Classics" in Japan.

On the Oricon charts, it reached number four. On Billboard's Classical Albums chart list reached number eleven, while on Billboard Japan it reached number three at the Top Albums list, and number one (for three consecutive weeks) at the Classical Albums list. On the iTunes Store, it reached number one on the classical charts in ten countries (Japan, Hong Kong, Malaysia, Macau, Singapore, Taiwan, Indonesia, Thailand, Finland and Canada). In the United States and Norway it reached number two, number six in Australia, and number ten in France.

== Track listing ==
All tracks are written by Yoshiki.

North America
No.	Title	Length
1.	"Miracle"	4:52
2.	"Red Christmas (Classical Version)"	7:20
3.	"Seize the Light (Live) [Classical Version]"	6:32
4.	"Golden Globe Theme"	3:49
5.	"Tears (Classical Version)"	5:04
6.	"Anniversary (Theme for the Emperor of Japan 10 Year Anniversary)"	7:18
7.	"Forever Love (Classical Version)"	8:19
8.	"I'll Be Your Love (Theme for the World Expo Japan) [Classical Version]"	9:03
9.	"Amethyst"	6:20
10.	"Say Anything (Classical Version)"	10:09
11.	"Golden Globe Theme (Quartet Version)"	3:48

Worldwide
No.	Title	Length
1.	"Miracle"	4:52
2.	"Seize the Light (Classical Version)"	6:32
3.	"Golden Globe Theme"	3:49
4.	"Tears (Classical Version)"	5:04
5.	"Red Christmas (Classical Version)"	7:20
6.	"Anniversary"	7:18
7.	"Forever Love (Classical Version)"	8:19
8.	"I'll Be Your Love (Classical Version)"	9:03
9.	"Amethyst"	6:20
10.	"The Last Song (Classical Version) [Live]"	8:07
11.	"Golden Globe Theme (Quartet Version)"	3:48

Yoshiki Melodies Classics (Japanese Edition)
No.	Title	Length
1.	"Miracle"	4:52
2.	"Golden Globe Theme"	3:49
3.	"Tears (Classical Version)"	5:04
4.	"Amethyst"	6:20
5.	"Say Anything (Classical Version)"	10:09
6.	"Golden Globe Theme (Quartet Version)"	3:48
7.	"Forever Love (Piano Solo Version)"	4:36

== Recording personnel ==
- Piano: Yoshiki
- Orchestra: London Philharmonic Orchestra, Tokyo Philharmonic Orchestra, Quartet San Francisco, Yoshiki Studio Orchestra
- Producer: Yoshiki, George Martin (#5, #9, #10)
- Executive producers: Yoshiki, Kei Ishizaka, Atsushi Suzuki, Kaz Utsunomiya, David Zierler, Kouki Hayashi, Kento Oki
- Orchestra arrangement: Yoshiki, David Campbell (#1), Shelly Berg (#2, #4, #6, #8), Ikurō Fujiwara (#3, #7), George Martin (#5), Graham Preskett (#9), Gavin Greenaway (#10), Jeremy Cohen (#11)
- Mixing engineer: Steve Churchyard (#1, #3, #8), Joe Chiccarelli (#2, #7), Ryan Boesch (#4), Haydn Bendall (#5, #9, #10), Takao Suga (#6), Leslie Ann Jones (#11)
- Mastering engineer: Stephen Marcussen
