= Marina Ōno =

Japanese voice actress

- 大野まりな
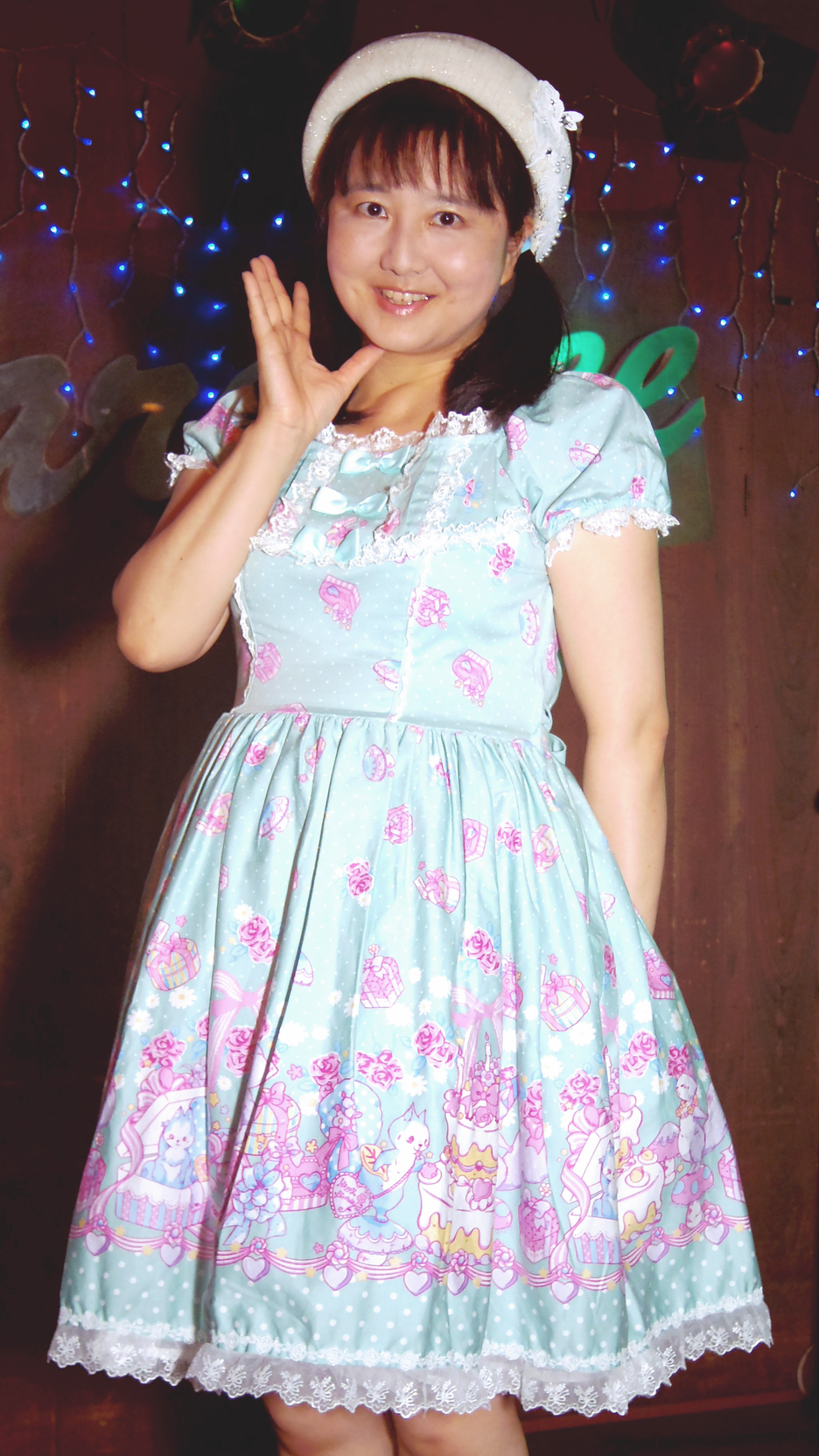
- Oono Marina at MARQUEE 2019-06-08
- Born: Hiromi Katayama; April 5, 1972 (age 54); Hiroshima, Japan
- Other names: Hiromi Matsumoto (松本裕美); Hiromi Asō (麻生ひろみ); Hiromi Katayama (片山裕美); Chihiro Kanzaki (神崎ちひろ)
- Occupation: Voice actress
- Years active: 1995–present

Hiromi Katayama (Japanese: 片山裕美, Hepburn: Katayama Hiromi; born April 5, 1972), known by the stage name Marina Ōno (大野まりな, Ōno Marina), is a Japanese voice actress. She has also been known as Hiromi Matsumoto (松本裕美) and Hiromi Asō (麻生ひろみ). Some of her major roles in anime are: Faury Carat in Tristia of the Deep Blue Sea, Chiaki Nakahara in Dai-Guard, Aihara in Angel Links and Komoe Harumachi in Eiken. In video games, she voices Aki Nitta in Soul Link, Remit Marlena in Eternal Melody, Ayaka Nanase in First Kiss Story and Uriko in the Bloody Roar series.

== Filmography ==
=== Anime ===
List of voice performances in anime
Year	Title	Role	Notes	Source
1996	You're Under Arrest	Yuka Endo 遠藤祐香		
1999	Angel Links	Elizabeth Aihara Chang		
1999	Dai-Guard	Chiaki Nakahara		
2000	Vandread	Assistant		
2001	You're Under Arrest Second Season	Yuka Endo, others		
2004	Burst Angel	Shiho Kazami		
2006	Soul Link	Aki Nitta		
	Eien no Aseria	Orpha		
	Tristia of the Deep Blue Sea	Faury Carat		

=== Film ===
List of voice performances in film
Year	Title	Role	Notes	Source
1999	You're Under Arrest: The Movie	Yuka Endo 遠藤裕香		

=== Video games ===
List of voice performances in video games
Year	Title	Role	Notes	Source
1995–98	Anime Freak FX	Rolfee	6 volumes, PC-FX	
1996	Eternal Melody	Remit Marlena	SS, PS1/PS2	
1997	Saturn Bomberman Fight! ja:サターンボンバーマン ファイト！！	Honey	SS	
1998	Tensen Nyan Nyan 天仙娘々 ～劇場版～	Mahjong Daiou III	PS1/PS2	
1998	First Kiss Story	Ayaka Nanase	PC-FX, PS	
1998	Princess Express ja:お嬢様特急	Chihiro Negishi, Tsubasa Nanao	PS1/PS2, SS	
1998	Hoshi no Oka Gakuen Monogatari Gakuensa ja:星の丘学園物語 学園祭	Terumi Hyuga 日向照美	PS1/PS2	
1999	Bloody Roar 2	Uriko Nonomura	PS1/PS2	
1999	Nurse Monogatari ja:ナース物語	Yuna Mizuguchi 水口遊菜	PS1/PS2	
2001	Bloody Roar 3	Uriko	PS1/PS2	
2002	Bloody Roar Primal Fury / Bloody Roar Extreme	Uriko	PS	
2002	Tristia of the Deep Blue Sea	Faury Carat	PC	
2003–04	Eiken	Komoe Harumachi	OVA	
2004	Pure Pure	Sachi	PC Adult	
2004	Soul Link	Aki Nitta	PC Adult	
2006	Soul Link Extension	Aki Nitta	PS1/PS2	
	Dodge de Ball	Aya Saotome		

=== Drama CD ===
List of voice performances in drama CDs and audio presentations
Year	Title	Role	Notes	Source
	Soul Link	Aki Nitta		
	Eternal Melody	Remit Marlena		
	First Kiss Story			
