= Ballad Collection =

Ballad Collection may refer to:

- Ballad Collection (X Japan album), 1997
- Ballad Collection (Lana Lane album), 1998
