= Yoshiki: Under the Sky =

2023 American film

- Promotional poster for 2023 release of Yoshiki: Under the Sky
- Directed by: Yoshiki
- Produced by: Sid Ganis; Mark Ritchie; Doug Kluthe; Aaron Latham-James
- Starring: Yoshiki; Sarah Brightman; Jane Zhang; Scorpions; SixTones; Nicole Scherzinger; St. Vincent; Sugizo; Hyde; Lindsey Stirling; The Chainsmokers
- Cinematography: Ken Whales; Michael Pessah; Rachel Bickert
- Edited by: Spencer Lee; Takashi Uchida; David Swift; Merritt Lear; Jim Yukich; Claire Didier; Imran Virani; Bryan Roberts
- Music by: Yoshiki
- Production company: A List Media Entertainment
- Distributed by: Abramorama
- Release dates: September 5, 2023 (Japan premiere); September 7, 2023 (USA premiere)
- Running time: 91 min.
- Country: USA
- Language: English

Yoshiki: Under the Sky is a 2023 music documentary film directed by Japanese musician and composer Yoshiki, leader of the rock bands X Japan and The Last Rockstars, and produced by Sid Ganis, Mark Ritchie, Doug Kluthe, and Aaron Latham-James. We Are X director Stephen Kijak participated as a consulting producer on the film.

Conceived and recorded during the COVID-19 pandemic, the film is combination of Yoshiki's live performances with musical artists from around the world and interviews with fans and musicians. The film features performances by Yoshiki, Sarah Brightman, Jane Zhang, Scorpions, SixTones, Nicole Scherzinger, St. Vincent, Sugizo, Hyde, Lindsey Stirling, and The Chainsmokers.

The film premiered in Tokyo on September 5, 2023, followed by international premieres in London, New York, and Los Angeles.

== Synopsis ==
The music documentary film Yoshiki: Under the Sky features musician and composer Yoshiki collaborating with musicians from the United States, China, England, Germany, and Japan for in-person and remote performances. Filmed during the COVID-19 pandemic, the film also includes music fans in video performances and interviews.

== Production ==
Yoshiki recorded live performances in Los Angeles with St. Vincent, Nicole Scherzinger, Lindsey Stirling, and The Chainsmokers. In addition, Yoshiki recorded interviews and performances from his studio in Hollywood and mixed in remote performances by the film's other musicians from their home countries.

== Release ==
=== Theatrical ===
Yoshiki: Under the Sky premiered at Toho Cinemas Roppongi Hills on September 5, 2023. The film then premiered internationally in New York on September 7 (AMC Empire 25 Times Square), in London on September 11 (Odeon Covent Garden), and Los Angeles on September 14 (TCL Chinese 6 Hollywood).

The film was distributed in over 100 theaters in Japan and received limited theatrical release in the United States, England, France, and Germany.

=== Home Video ===
Yoshiki: Under the Sky was released in the U.S. on DVD, Blu-ray, and on-demand digital video by Magnolia Home Entertainment on November 19, 2024.

The film began streaming on Amazon Prime Video in the U.S. and Japan on February 20, 2025. On December 8, 2025, the film received an expanded global digital release via Prime Video and Apple TV in United Kingdom, Canada, New Zealand, Germany, France, Italy, Norway, Denmark, Switzerland, Romania, Hungary, and Czechia.

== Promotion ==
At the Japanese premiere on September 5, Yoshiki appeared on the red carpet with Godzilla and unveiled a collaboration poster connecting Yoshiki: Under the Sky with the film Godzilla Minus One. On September 14, preceding the Los Angeles premiere, Yoshiki became the first Japanese artist to be honored with a hand and footprint ceremony at the Chinese Theatre in Hollywood.

== Critical reception ==
Total Film magazine gave the film 4 out of 5 stars: "Part concert film, part tribute to humanity’s resilience in the face of adversity, its seamlessly integrated performances showcase Yoshiki’s singular gifts."

Mxdwn reviewed the film as "an unforgettable experience that fuses artistry, emotion, and the unifying power of music". Revolver praised its "superbly arranged performances" and cited the documentary's personal approach: "Under the Sky is a proper ode to what Yoshiki has lost and what he has gained." Spin stated that the film's "no-expense-spared production and smooth editing propel it into timeless territory."

== Songs ==
External videos
- Clip from documentary film "YOSHIKI: Under the Sky" YOSHIKI x The Chainsmokers - "Closer" on YouTube
- Clip from documentary film "YOSHIKI: Under the Sky" YOSHIKI x Scorpions - "Wind of Change" on YouTube
- Clip from documentary film "YOSHIKI: Under the Sky" YOSHIKI x Nicole Scherzinger “I’ll Be Your Love” on YouTube

All arranged and produced by Yoshiki
(in order of performance)

- Sarah Brightman: "Miracle" (lyrics and music by Yoshiki)
- Jane Zhang: "Hero" (lyrics and music by Yoshiki)
- Scorpions: "Wind of Change" (Ukraine version) (Note: The Scorpions sang the Ukraine version of the lyrics for the first time in this performance.) (lyrics and music by Klaus Meine)
- SixTones: "Imitation Rain" (lyrics and music by Yoshiki)
- Nicole Scherzinger: "I'll Be Your Love" (lyrics and music by Yoshiki)
- St. Vincent: "New York" (lyrics and music by Annie Clark, Jack Antonoff)
- Sugizo (on violin): "La Venus" (lyrics and music by Yoshiki)
- Hyde: "Red Swan" (feat. Sugizo on guitar) (lyrics and music by Yoshiki)
- Lindsey Stirling (on violin): "Forever Love" (lyrics and music by Yoshiki)
- The Chainsmokers: "Closer" (lyrics and music by Andrew Taggart, Ashley Frangipane, Shaun Frank, Frederic Kennett, Isaac Slade, Joe King)
- Yoshiki: "Endless Rain" (feat. chorus by people from all over the world) (lyrics and music by Yoshiki)
