= B.O.X: Best of X =

B.O.X ~Best of X~

Compilation album by X Japan
- Released: March 21, 1996, December 1, 1996
- Genre: Heavy metal, speed metal, power metal
- Length: CD 1: 71:59; CD 2: 61:11; VHS: 82:05
- Label: Ki/oon

X Japan compilation chronology
X Singles (1993)	B.O.X ~Best of X~ (1996)	Ballad Collection (1997)

B.O.X ~Best of X~ is a compilation box set released by X Japan on March 21, 1996. It contains two CDs, a VHS tape and a T-shirt from the "Violence and Jealousy Tour". The album reached number 5 on the Oricon chart. It was re-released on December 1, 1996, in a different case without any extras and without the last three tracks on disc one.

== Track listing ==
Disc one

1. "Silent Jealousy" (Live 1992.01.07) – 6:30
2. "Desperate Angel" – 5:53
3. "Kurenai" (Live 1989.06.10) – 5:45
4. "Week End" (Live 1992.01.07) – 5:53
5. "Endless Rain" – 6:36
6. "Celebration" – 4:52
7. "Joker" (Live 1992.01.07) – 5:18
8. "Sadistic Desire" (New Version) – 6:01
9. "X" – 6:01
10. "Say Anything" – 8:42
11. "I'll Kill You" – 3:29
12. "Kurenai" (English Version) – 6:19
13. "Unfinished" – 1:32

Disc two (instrumental versions)

1. "Silent Jealousy" – 7:20
2. "Desperate Angel" – 5:44
3. "Kurenai" – 5:47
4. "Week End" – 5:49
5. "Endless Rain" – 6:32
6. "Celebration" – 4:48
7. "Joker" – 4:41
8. "Sadistic Desire" – 5:59
9. "X" – 5:59
10. "Say Anything" – 8:40
