= X Japan Singles: Atlantic Years =

X Japan Singles ~Atlantic Years~

Compilation album by X Japan
- Released: December 25, 1997
- Genre: Heavy metal, progressive metal, rock
- Length: 72:20
- Label: Atlantic

X Japan compilation chronology
Ballad Collection (1997)	X Japan Singles; ~Atlantic Years~ (1997)	Special Box (1997)

X Japan Singles ~Atlantic Years~ is a compilation album released by X Japan on December 25, 1997. It serves as a follow-up to 1993's X Singles and contains most, but not all, A and B-sides released by the band after changing its name from "X" to "X Japan". The album reached number 14 on the Oricon chart.

== Track listing ==
1. "Tears"
2. "Tears (Classical Version)"
3. "Rusty Nail"
4. "Longing ~Togireta Melody~"
5. "Dahlia"
6. "Tears (Live)"
7. "Forever Love"
8. "Crucify My Love"
9. "Week End (Live)"
10. "Scars"
11. "White Poem (M.T.A. Mix)"
