= PrincessSoft =

Japanese video game company

PrincessSoft was a Japanese company. It specialized in the development of visual novel video game ports for use on home video game consoles such as the PlayStation 2 and the Dreamcast. It had two imprints: Primavera, which specialized in female-oriented products, and Nine's Fox, which also released ports of adult visual novels. None of the three brands have released any products since 2009.

== Games ==
=== PrincessSoft ===
- Furimukeba Tonari ni (2001)
- Day of Love (2001)
- Nukumori no Naka de ~in the warmth~ (2001)
- D+Vine Luv (2001)
- 21-Two One- (2001)
- Yukinko☆Burning (2002)
- Nijuuei (2002)
- Metal Wolf (2002)
- Hourglass of Summer (2002)
- Suika (2002)
- Mei☆Puru (2002)
- Happy Breeding (2003)
- Kimi ga Nozomu Eien (2003)
- Phantom of Inferno (2003)
- Cafe Little Wish ~Mahou no Recipe~ (2003)
- Marginal ~Ano Toki no Tooi Yakusoku wo~ (2003)
- Sakura: Setsugetsuka(2003)
- Natsuiro Komachi <Ichiji Senka> (2003)
- Lost Passage ~Ushinawareta Hitofushi~ (2003)
- MoeKan (2003)
- Te no Hira o, Taiyou ni ~Eikyuu no Kizuna~ (2004)
- 3LDK: Shiawase ni Narō yo (2004)
- F Fanatic (2004)
- W Wish (2004)
- Final Approach (2004)
- Natsuiro ~Hoshikuzu no Memory~ (2004)
- Doko e Iku no, Ano Hi ~Hikaru Ashita e...~ (2005)
- Cafe Lindbergh ~Summer Season~ (2005)
- Lovely Idol (2005)
- Magical Tale (2005)
- Home Maid (2005)
- Hatsukoi -first kiss- (2005)
- Sora-iro no Organ (2005)
- Rune Princess (2005)
- White Clarity (2005)
- Finalist (2006)
- TsuyoKiss: Mighty Heart (2006)
- :Quartett! The Stage of Love (2006)
- Hokenshitsu e Youkoso (2006)
- Yumemishi (2006)
- Que: Ancient Leaf no Yousei (with 5pb., 2007)
- Iinazuke (2007)
- Star Train: Your Past Makes Your Future (2007)
- Final Approach 2: 1st Priority (2008)
- Yumemi Hakusho (2008)
- Kira Kira ~Rock n'Roll Show~ (2009)

=== Primavera ===
- KimiSuta ~Kimi to Study~ (2006)
- Trouble Fortune Company Happy Cure (2007)

=== Nine's Fox ===
- Quilt ~Anata to Tsumugu Yume to Koi no Dress~ (2007)
- Yatohime Zankikou -Ken no Maki- (2007)
- Shikaku Tantei Sora no Sekai ~Thousand Dreams~ (2007)
- Colorful Aquarium -My Little Mermaid- (2007)
- Nettai Teikiatsu Shoujo (2007)
- Gin no Eclipse (2008)
