= Hourglass of Summer =

2002 video game

- Developer: Princess Soft
- Publisher: Hirameki International
- Producers: Masato Someya; Kiyotaka Okiai; Naoyuki Shinoda
- Artist: Suigun Murakami
- Platforms: Microsoft Windows, PlayStation 2
- Release: JP: May 30, 2002; NA: 2004
- Genres: Bishōjo, Visual novel, Dating sim
- Mode: Single player

Hourglass of Summer (夏色の砂時計, Natsuiro no Sunadokei) is a Japanese visual novel that was released by Princess Soft. It was brought to the U.S. by the Hirameki International Group. It was one of the first interactive dating games to be translated into English (although there was never an English voice dub for the US release). Originally, it was released exclusively in Japan in a PlayStation 2 format that could only be played on Japanese systems. Later, a PC version, also exclusively Japanese, was released, only this time with erotic content added to it. The U.S. version was released as an interactive DVD that didn't contain sexual content.

Hourglass of Summer also has a 2 episode OVA that was released in Japan. It was animated by Rikuentai and Picture Magic, with direction by Takahiro Okao, scripts by Isao Shizuya, character designs by Yasunari Nitta, and music composed by Yuuichi Oota and Ryou Sakai.

== Plot ==
The story revolves around a Japanese sophomore named Kotaro Makimura. As the school year ends and summer vacation approaches, he decides to admit his feelings to his crush, the beautiful Kaho Serizawa. As hopeless as the situation looks to his best friends Ai and Takeshi, he is determined to make Kaho his girlfriend by the end of summer vacation. However, on his way home, he has a collision with a mysterious stranger, and ends up getting covered in a strange multi-colored powder. When he wakes up the next day, he finds himself waking up on September 1 - the first day of the next school year. He also learns that Kaho, who had been his girlfriend, had died in a car accident. Eventually, Kotaro discovers that he has begun day-dropping, in which he skips days, and goes back and forth in time through different days of the summer vacation. With the help of Ligene the Time Patroller (also translated as Lee Jane), Kotaro must win Kaho's heart and prevent her death before he runs out of time.

Although Kaho is the girl that Kotaro aspires for at the beginning of the game, the player can choose different decisions that will eventually lead him to relationships with one of the other four girls. Of course, the wrong decisions could result in an ending in which Kotaro wins the affections of none of them. Although the objective of the game is to become the boyfriend of one of the girls, some of these other endings can be the only way to view certain images not found in the other paths.
