= Lovely Idol =

Japanese media franchise

- Lovedol ~Lovely Idol~
- Logo from the anime series

らぶドル 〜Lovely Idol〜 (Rabudoru)
- Light novel
- Written by: Kohki Kanoh
- Illustrated by: Aoi Nishimata
- Published by: Enterbrain
- Magazine: Magi-Cu
- Original run: April 27, 2001 – February 27, 2004
- Video game
- Developer: PrincessSoft
- Publisher: PrincessSoft
- Genre: Bishōjo game, Dating sim
- Platform: PS2
- Released: April 28, 2005
- Light novel

Lovedol -New Lyrics-
- Written by: Agobaria
- Illustrated by: Aoi Nishimata
- Published by: Enterbrain
- Magazine: Magi-Cu
- Original run: April 25, 2006 – March 24, 2007
- Anime television series
- Directed by: Keitaro Motonaga
- Written by: Koichi Taki
- Studio: AIC; TNK
- Original network: AT-X, Chiba TV, Sun TV, TV Saitama
- Original run: October 2, 2006 – December 18, 2006
- Episodes: 12
- Original video animation
- Directed by: Keitaro Motonaga
- Studio: AIC; TNK
- Released: March 28, 2007
- Runtime: 28 minutes

Lovedol ~Lovely Idol~ (らぶドル, Rabudoru; lit. a Japanese portmanteau of Lovely Idol) is the title of a Japanese series which focuses on a group of young girls who are striving to become famous Japanese idols.

The series first began as a set of light novels serialized in Enterbrain's Magi-Cu magazine. The franchise grew to include radio shows, drama CDs, a Japanese bishōjo game by PrincessSoft, and an anime television series which aired between October and December 2006.

== Plot ==
The Lovely Idols are a group of young idol singers who have become very popular. Managed by Tomohiro Fujisawa, there have already been two "generations" of performers, with a third about to debut. However, right before the third generation is cued onstage at a concert, Tomohiro learns that their debut has been delayed by the company president. He isn't told why, but is left to figure out for himself what, exactly, the next generation is lacking. While considering what he should do to remedy the situation, he finds a young street musician singing and playing a guitar. Tomohiro may think he's found the answer to his problem, but recruiting her could turn out to be harder than expected.

== Characters ==
The voice actors listed are from the anime adaptation.

=== Third generation idols ===
Mizuki Sakaki (榊 瑞樹, Sakaki Mizuki); (Voiced by: Sakura Nogawa)
Specialty: Singing
Mizuki is known as "The Princess of Songs" on the streets, as she often plays on the streets with her guitar. Many famous record companies have asked her to record for them but she turned them all down. When Tomohiro first asked her to become an idol, she strongly refused and said that she only sings for revenge. However, this all changed once when she first sings on stage with the other idols of the third generation, as seen in episode 3 of the anime. Ever since then, she officially became one of the idols in training with the third batch. Later on in the series, it is revealed that Mizuki's original intent of revenge stemmed from the fact that her mother Akina Sakaki abandoned her when she was just a child. Tomohiro encouraged Mizuki to confront Akina and rekindle their relationship, in which she did. Mizuki, like many of the Lovely Idols, seems to have feelings for Tomohiro, in which he reciprocates, though it is only canon in the ending theme PV.
Kotoha Kiryū (桐生 琴葉, Kiryū Kotoha); (Voiced by: Mai Nakahara)
Specialty: Stand up comedy
A shy girl, she and her best friend Mai are the only two in the third batch of Lovedols who had debut experience before. Kotoha is also partnered up with Mai for stand up comedy shows.
Mai Nonomiya (野々宮 舞, Nonomiya Mai); (Voiced by: Haruko Momoi)
Specialty: Stand up comedy
Mai is a short and hot tempered girl. She often becomes the subject of jokes when compared to the breast sizes of the other members of the third generation. According to Mai, she was a child actor for 8 years before joining the third generation. She is also extremely proud of her own body; having gone as far as to wear a daring bikini made of shells to show off herself once, only to be forced to change back into a one piece swimsuit.
Miu Nekoya (猫谷 海羽, Nekoya Miu); (Voiced by: Yuko Goto)
Specialty: Dancing
Miu often says "nyuu~" at the end of her sentences. Miu is fond of dancing and is very energetic. She has problems imitating the sound of dogs (A pun on her last name, which translates to 'cat valley'), always ending up sounding like a cat instead.
Hina Hōjō (北条 比奈, Hōjō Hina); (Voiced by: Minori Chihara)
Specialty: Theater acting
Hina is the younger sister of the Chocorat Sisters from the first generation of idols. She often admires her older sisters with pride and joy. Whenever Hina brings up her sisters, she goes on and on about it until someone gets sick of it. Hina also likes to make pastries, but she is very bad at it; often resulting in explosions. Later on in the series, it is also revealed that she's bad at ovenware in general, as she made the microwave oven explode while reheating a bowl of miso soup.
Ruri Fujisawa (藤沢 瑠璃, Fujisawa Ruri); (Voiced by: Kanako Sakai)
Specialty: Voice acting
Ruri is Tomohiro's cheerful younger sister who personally asked the president of Sweetfish Productions to join the third batch of idols. She is a fan of the Magical Girl Sally series and has gotten a role in it. Ruri also cares a lot for Tomohiro to a point that he thinks she's kind of annoying.

=== Sweetfish Productions staff ===
Tomohiro Fujisawa (藤沢 智弘, Fujisawa Tomohiro); (Voiced by: Hideki Ogihara)
Tomohiro works as one of the managers in Sweetfish Productions. He was the manager of all the Lovely Idols prior to the start of anime. Tomohiro is currently the manager of the 3rd Generation Lovely Idols. He is very popular with the Lovely Idols from the 1st and 2nd Generations, but is too dense to realize their growing feelings for him.
Mariko (真理子, Mariko); (Voiced by: Chinomi Takema)
Mariko is the president of Sweetfish Productions, which is the company that produces the Lovely Idols. She demanded that the third batch are to delay their debut until Tomohiro could figure out what they were lacking. Mariko tends to have a serious, business-like personality who only wants the best from her employees.
Miki Fujisawa (藤沢 美樹, Fujisawa Miki); (Voiced by: Eriko Kawasaki)
Miki is Ruri and Tomohiro's older sister, who is also a manager. Miki introduced her brother to Mariko, who in response granted him the position of manager. She is somewhat tomboyish, and tends to attack her brother in a playful way, causing Tomohiro to fear her a little. Ruri doesn't seem to have a good relationship with her, as shown when she speaks rather coldly to her older sister, and also the fact that Ruri never calls Miki 'big sister'.

=== First generation idols ===
Aya Hiwatari (日渡 あや, Hiwatari Aya); (Voiced by: Ayako Kawasumi)
Aya is a singer, and she has a crush on Tomohiro. The latter seems to reciprocate her feelings, as the two tried to share a kiss only to be interrupted by a phone call. Out of all of the Lovely Idols, Aya is the most forward girl in expressing her feelings.
China Hōjō (北条 知奈, Hōjō China); (Voiced by: Moyu Arishima) & Mina Hōjō (北条 美奈, Hōjō Mina); (Voiced by: Kumi Kawai) (Chocorat Sisters)
China and Mina are twin singers. They both have feelings for Tomohiro. China seems to have minor tsundere attributes, whereas Mina is polite and a bit goofy.
Yui Arisugawa (有栖川 唯, Arisugawa Yui); (Voiced by: Sakura Nogawa)
Yui is a voice actress who has a habit of holding onto cats.
Ayumi Shindo (進藤 あゆみ, Shindo Ayumi); (Voiced by: Mayako Nigo)
Ayumi is a model and a singer who often wears a kimono like outfit. She has feelings for Tomohiro, and is disappointed that he doesn't realize how she feels.
Sayuki Katagiri (片桐 沙有紀, Katagiri Sayuki); (Voiced by: Yu Asakawa)
Sayuki is a model. Like many of the Lovely Idols, she is in love with Tomohiro, and felt disappointed that he didn't compliment how cute she looked in a bikini.

=== Second generation idols ===
Tōko Yuki (結城 瞳子, Yuki Tōko); (Voiced by: Natsuko Kuwatani)
Toko is a singer who fights to win Tomohiro's affection. She is forward as she clutches onto Tomohiro and makes affectionate comments such as, 'We look like a couple, don't we?'
Hibiki Asami (浅見 ひびき, Asami Hibiki); (Voiced by: Akiko Kobayashi) & Shizuku Oji (大路 しずく, Oji Shizuku); (Voiced by: Rie Kugimiya) (Piccolo Sisters)
The Piccolo sisters have been known to be troublemakers. This can be seen in episode 6 when they invade the apartment of the third batch. They used to live in the apartment the third generation lived in and they know all the secret routes within (as shown in the episode where a map with secret routes listed is shown). Hibiki and Shizuku both have feelings for Tomohiro, in which the former feels nervous around him and the latter constantly clinging onto Tomohiro with her legs and rubbing herself onto him.
Yukimi Naruse (成瀬 雪見, Naruse Yukimi); (Voiced by: Hisayo Mochizuki)
Yukimi is a voice actress who has a habit of holding onto a bunny doll. She has feelings for Tomohiro, and hides her face behind her bunny whenever she feels nervous around him.
Makoto Fujita (藤田 真琴, Fujita Makoto); (Voiced by: Ryoko Shintani)
Makoto is an actress who specializes in action movies.
Rei Nagasawa (長澤 玲, Nagasawa Rei); (Voiced by: Yumi Kakazu)
Rei is a model.

== Media ==
Lovely Idol was first created as a series of illustrated short stories, and later adapted into radio shows, drama CDs, a video game, and finally a televised anime series.

=== Illustrated short stories ===
Lovely Idol was first serialized in Enterbrain's Magical Cute Premium magazine, beginning with the inaugural spring 2001 issue (released April 27, 2001), featuring the story by Kohki Kanoh and character designs/illustrations by Aoi Nishimata. It followed the transition from the quarterly Premium to the monthly Magi-Cu magazine on February 27, 2004, where it ran until the 13th volume. Serialization resumed from the 26th issue (released April 25, 2006) to the 37th issue (released March 24, 2007) with the New Lyrics subtitle, and introduced the "third generation" cast of characters. Story writing was credited to Agobaria, and copyright was shared by Enterbrain and Omegavision (parent company of Navel).

=== Radio shows ===
A 16-episode Lovely Idol radio show first premiered on Animate TV's Net Radio in 2003. In 2004, Lovely Idol became part of a Magicue show on Radio Kansai that was transitioned to Lantis Net Radio in 2005. A new radio show based on the anime cast began airing on Animate TV's Net Radio in 2006.

=== Drama CDs ===
Lantis published four Lovely Idol Drama CDs, beginning in 2003, featuring the first two generations of idols, and a drama CD featuring the third generation was released in 2007. Another six-disc drama CD series was also released in 2007, with each disc telling the same story from the perspective of each of the third-generation characters.

=== Video game ===
The Lovely Idol visual novel video game was released on April 28, 2005, on the PlayStation 2 console, and was developed by video game company PrincessSoft.

The player takes the role of Tomohiro, managing the girls' schedules and helping them improve their skills. The player must also talk to the girls about their troubles and go on dates with them. The game could be considered a part of the "raising sim" subgenre of bishōjo games due to its focus on training the Lovedols.

=== Anime ===
An anime television series adaptation animated by AIC A.S.T.A and TNK first aired in Japan on October 3, 2006. The TV broadcast consists of 12 episodes, where the 12th episode aired on 19 December 2006. The 13th and final episode was made available as a DVD-exclusive OVA released in Japan on 28 March 2007.

==== Episodes ====
No.	Title	Original release date
1	"Are You a Lovedol?"; Transliteration: "Rabudoru desu ka?" (Japanese: らぶドルですか?)	October 2, 2006
We are introduced to Lovedol, which is an all-girl idol group with members of two generations. The third generation is about to make their debut, but the President of Sweetfish Productions delays it last minute. Manager Tomohiro is vaguely told to find what the girls are lacking. And just when he meets the perfect idol candidate, she declines.
2	"Is it NG?"; Transliteration: "NG desu ka?" (Japanese: NGですか?)	October 9, 2006
The girls from the third group of idols attempt to persuade Mizuki to join them, but are unsuccessful. Tomohiro tries once more with talking with her later, however.
3	"Is it an Opening Performance?"; Transliteration: "Zenza desu ka?" (Japanese: 前座ですか?)	October 16, 2006
The Chocorat Sisters are going to put on a private concert and Tomohiro wants the third group of LoveDols to be there as well. Meanwhile, Mizuki is still contemplating Tomohiro's offer to join the third group.
4	"Is it a Retirement?"; Transliteration: "Intai desu ka?" (Japanese: 引退ですか?)	October 23, 2006
Tomohiro comes down with a cold so Ruri must step in for him as the third group's manager. Today, they go to a voice acting recording where Yukimi Naruse of the second group is playing the lead role in a new anime so that the third group can get some idea of what else is expected of an idol.
5	"Is it a Barter?"; Transliteration: "Bātā desu ka?" (Japanese: バーターですか?)	October 30, 2006
The third group gets a chance to dance in a commercial with Sayuki Katagiri, though getting the dance in sync is already hard enough. What will they do when they fail the first time?
6	"Are you Set?"; Transliteration: "Setto desu ka?" (Japanese: セットですか?)	November 6, 2006
While staying in their dormitory, the third group starts noticing strange things happening and suspect ghosts are the cause.
7	"Is it a Rapid Development?"; Transliteration: "Kyuutenkai, desu ka?" (Japanese: 急展開、ですか?)	November 13, 2006
The third group has been given an ultimatum - there will be one final performance in a month and if it fails, the third group will be broken up. Tomohiro has them work as Ayumi Shindo's managers for a day to give them a chance to see what they are lacking.
8	"Is it a Solo?"; Transliteration: "Soro desu ka?" (Japanese: ソロですか?)	November 20, 2006
Mizuki has been offered a solo debut, because she has the one "thing" that the other five girls are lacking. Apparently they are relying too much on the girl, and thus they will never find what their flaws are.
9	"Is it a Breakup?"; Transliteration: "Kaisan desu ka?" (Japanese: 解散ですか?)	November 27, 2006
Torn by these decisions, Mizuki wishes to leave the company. The other girls are angered at this, and think that they are only being a burden to their friend.
10	"Can you Reach it?" Transliteration: "Todokimasu ka?" (Japanese: 届きますか?)	December 4, 2006
Tomohiro receives a phone call from Mizuki's mother, and Mizuki is angered by this. The rest of the third batch continue to practice, each trying to promote the ticket sales. Mizuki later decides to meet up with her mother to straighten things out.
11	"The Song, Do you Remember it?" Transliteration: "Uta, Oboete imasu ka?" (Japanese: 歌·おぼえていますか?)	December 11, 2006
Mizuki confronts her mother and her feelings while the rest of the third batch continue to practice and promote their event, this time with the help of their seniors.
12	"Is it the Debut?"; Transliteration: "Hajimari (Debuu) desu ka?" (Japanese: はじまり(デビュー)ですか?)	December 18, 2006
Finally, it is the day of the debut. The third batch Lovedols do well, and Mizuki solves her problems.

== Music ==
Opening Themes
#	Transcription/Translation	Performed by	Episodes
	Love, let's start! (恋, はじめました!; "Koi, Hajimemashita!")	Sakura Nogawa	All

Ending themes
#	Transcription/Translation	Performed by	Episodes
	It's LoveLoveLove's fault! (LoveLoveLoveのせいなのよ!; "LoveLoveLove no seina no yo!")	Sakura Nogawa, Mai Nakahara, Haruko Momoi, Yūko Gotō	All

Insert Songs
#	Transcription/Translation	Performed by	Episodes
	Happy Revolution (シアワセ革命; "Shiawase Kakumei")	First generation idols	01
	The lost mark of the heart is upward (ココロの失印は上向き; "Kokoro no Shitsu Shirushi wa Uemuki")	Second generation idols	01
	Endless Sky (果てしのない空; "Hateshi no Nai Sora")	Mizuki Sakaki (Sakura Nogawa)	01, 02 and 13
	Thank You (ありがとう; "Arigato")	Tōko Yuki (Natsuko Kuwatani)	02
