= Hanoka =

Japanese anime series

- Genre: Military, Sci-fi
- Anime television series
- Directed by: Aruji Morino
- Studio: Fanworks, RAMS
- Original network: Kids Station
- Original run: August 7, 2006 – October 23, 2006
- Episodes: 12

Hanoka (〜葉ノ香〜, Hanokō) is a 12-episode anime created by RAMS and Fanworks. Directed by Aruzi Morino, it was broadcast in Japan on Kids Station between August 7, 2006, and October 23, 2006. It is the first non-comedy focused anime television series entirely created with Adobe Flash animation.

The opening theme of the anime is "Dual Love on the planet ~Hanoka~" by Sakura Nogawa.

On October 4, 2006, Lantis released a maxi single for the anime's opening theme, "Dual Love on the planet ~Hanoka~". It was sung by Sakura Nogawa. The song was composed by Hironobu Kageyama.

On September and October 2008, 2 DVD volumes were released in Japan. This release is notable for including a Director's cut which includes new scenes, replaced dialogue and inclusion of prologue and epilogue.

== Story ==
On planet Tokinea, a huge war between the humans and the indigenous alien species, The Star Inhabitant (星の民, was raging. Humans were overpowered by The Star Inhabitants' power to control nature and came to the conclusion to produce a bionic human weapon named the Majin (lit. Demon God, Bionic Demigod). The 7th Majin, Majin No. 7, was also ordered to roll out to the battlefield. In the battlefield, she meets a male child soldier, Yuuri, and teams up with him.

== Characters ==
- Hanoko (葉ノ香, Hanokō) Voiced by: Sakura Nogawa
- Yūri Kaminoza (ユウリ·カミノザ, Kaminoza Yūri) Voiced by: Momoko Saito
- Kokōtō (コクトウ, Kokōtō) Voiced by: Yoshifumi Ooe
- Kaori Harusaki (カオリ·ハルサキ, Harusaki Kaori) Voiced by: Tomoe Oumi
- Mika Kisaragi (ミカ·キサラギ, Kisaragi Mika) Voiced by: Yoshino Nanjō

== Episode listing ==
No.	Title	Original release date
1	"Battleground"; Transliteration: "Ikusa no Chi" (Japanese: 戦の地)	August 7, 2006
2	"Demon"; Transliteration: "Mashin" (Japanese: 魔神)	August 14, 2006
3	"Setting Off"; Transliteration: "Tabidachi" (Japanese: 旅立ち)	August 21, 2006
4	"Hope"; Transliteration: "Kibō" (Japanese: 希望)	August 28, 2006
5	"Silence"; Transliteration: "Seijaku" (Japanese: 静寂)	September 4, 2006
6	"Name"; Transliteration: "Namae" (Japanese: 名前)	September 11, 2006
7	"Enemy"; Transliteration: "Ada" (Japanese: 仇)	September 18, 2006
8	"Parting"; Transliteration: "Wakare" (Japanese: 別れ)	September 25, 2006
9	"The Two"; Transliteration: "Futari" (Japanese: 二人)	October 2, 2006
10	"Sky"; Transliteration: "Sora" (Japanese: 空)	October 9, 2006
11	"Destruction"; Transliteration: "Hametsu" (Japanese: 破滅)	October 16, 2006
12	"King of the Stars"; Transliteration: "Hoshi no Ou" (Japanese: 星の王)	October 23, 2006
