= Ayakashi (video game) =

2005 video game

アヤカシ
- Genre: Adventure, Horror
- Video game
- Developer: Crossnet
- Genre: Visual novel
- Platform: Windows
- Released: October 28, 2005
- Video game

Ayakashi H
- Developer: Crossnet
- Genre: Visual novel
- Platform: Windows
- Released: September 29, 2006
- Anime television series
- Directed by: Jun Takada
- Written by: Takamitsu Kōno
- Music by: Sōshi Hosoi
- Studio: Tokyo Kids
- Licensed by: NA: Discotek Media
- Original network: AT-X, Chiba TV, Sun TV, Tokyo MX TV, TV Aichi, TV Kanagawa, TV Saitama
- Original run: December 12, 2007 – March 5, 2008
- Episodes: 12
- Manga
- Written by: Crossnet (original work); Yuushi Kanoe (art)
- Published by: Kodansha
- Magazine: Magazine Z
- Original run: March 21, 2008 – July 23, 2008
- Volumes: 2

Ayakashi (アヤカシ) is a 2005 eroge visual novel developed by Crossnet. A sequel was later released in 2006 with the name Ayakashi H. A twelve-episode anime adaptation aired in 2007. A bundle release of the game called Ayakashi Pack was released on December 14, 2007, to celebrate the release of the anime, containing both Ayakashi and Ayakashi H.

== Plot ==
Ayakashi are parasitic life forms that give their hosts superpowers, but in return, the use of these powers incurs an increasing physical and mental toll on the host eventually resulting in the host's death. Yū Kusaka is a student who lost his will to live after the death of a dear childhood friend. He is brought out of his depression by the arrival of a mysterious girl, named Eim Yoake, and his life is never the same again. Hunted by Ayakashi and their hosts, the power within Yū awakens and a never-ending battle begins.

=== Ayakashi H ===
The setting is one month after the events in Ayakashi.

== Characters ==
- The following voice actors are from the anime adaption.

Yū Kusaka (久坂 悠, Kusaka Yū)
Voiced by: Daisuke Kishio

The main character. He is a warm-hearted, caring Ayakashi handler who fights in order to fulfill the childhood promise he made to Hime and Izumi to protect them. Yu is the host of the strongest Ayakashi, Ryuu - a dragon-like Ayakashi. He was in love with Izumi and became introverted after her death. After meeting Eim and learning of what happened to her he starts to care for her. He cares deeply for both Hime and Eimu.

Eim Yoake (夜明 エイム, Yoake Eimu)
Voiced by: Nana Mizuki
The main heroine. Eim first appears as a bodyguard forced to protect Yū. Later into the series, Yu and Eim develop a bond in which she later chooses for herself to protect him. Eim has two Ayakashi, Akuro-ou, a large, blue Ayakashi and Satori, a small blue and white Ayakashi with the ability to fight and read minds. It is revealed that she killed Izumi two years ago and that, as the result of Izumi's last action, Izumi's mind was transferred to Eimu, including her feelings and memories. This is the reason that Eimu can control two Ayakashi. It took the past two years for Eimu to acclimate to having Izumi's consciousness coexist with her own.

Hime Yakushiji (薬師寺 陽愛, Yakushiji Hime)
Voiced by: Miyu Matsuki
Yū's childhood friend, she is very popular around the boys in school, but she always hangs around Yū whom she loves even though she knows that he loved Izumi. She becomes capable of seeing Ayakashi. Yū continues to protect her in fulfillment of a childhood promise he made to protect both her and Izumi even though he sometimes acts cold around her.

Pam Werne Asakura (パム・ウェルヌ・アサクラ, Pamu Werunu Asakura)
Voiced by: Ai Shimizu
A young Ayakashi handler (whose Ayakashi is Tengu) who attacks Eim along with Yū who is with her at the time. She captures them both and takes a liking to Yū, going so far as to go through a 'wedding' with him. When Eim frees herself and disables Pam, Yū prevents her from killing the girl, stating that because she is so young she needs a guiding hand to teach her right from wrong. As the result of this encounter, Pam's infatuation with Yū changes into something deeper and she becomes friends with Eim and Orie.

Izumi Makihara (牧原 和泉, Makihara Izumi)
Voiced by: Sakura Nogawa
Yū's childhood friend who was killed by Eim two years before the present day. She and Yū had strong feelings for one another. Satori was originally her Ayakashi. She was in contact with Eim's mind at the time of her death, using Satori's ability to do so. As a result, her consciousness was trapped in Eim's mind.

Orie Natsuhara (夏原 織江, Natsuhara Orie)
Voiced by: Sakura Nogawa
A girl who searches for something she doesn't know. She is a cat Ayakashi and when she changes her hairstyle she is identical to Izumi. Her master and Bakeneko's handler, Natsuhara, were killed by Kare.

Noriko Hanai
Voiced by: Kei Shindou
A classmate and friend of Hime's who also becomes friends with Yū and Eim. She can come off as rather nosy.

Kare (彼, Kare)
Voiced by: Tomokazu Sugita
The main antagonist. His real name is unknown and he is sometimes referred to as "Him". His Ayakashi is Orochi, a snake-like being. He pushes Yū to bring out his complete Ayakashi by sending his subordinates after him. He claims that he wants to use Yū and Ryuu's power to find a way for Ayakashi and humans to live together symbiotically but, in truth, he wants to heal his body which was crippled in an encounter with Yū during the incident leading to Izumi's death as well as consume the Ayakashi in the city in order to increase his own power.

Akino Yoake (夜明 アキノ, Yoake Akino)
Voiced by: Satsuki Yukino
Eim's older sister. She's loyal to "Him"; and tends to be cold towards Eim and Yū. She does not acknowledge Eim as her sister saying that she lost her sister "two years ago" when Eim chose to protect Yū instead of joining her sister's side. Her Ayakashi is Aterui - a smaller red version of Eim's Ayakashi Akuro-ou.

Akio Maekawa (前川 彰男, Maekawa Akio)
Voiced by: Daisuke Namikawa

Heima Kajiwara (梶原 平馬, Kajiwara Heima)
Voiced by: Tomoyuki Terai
Yū's senior, he is also an Ayakashi user who was ordered by Kare to keep an eye on Yū. His Ayakashi is Nurikabe.

=== Ayakashi H Characters ===
Kikuri Shirakami (白神 菊理, Shirakami Kikuri)
Hime's cousin and successor of the Shirakami family, she has the ability to seal and control Ayakashi with a stamp handed over by her family, also she has a pair of short swords to fight Ayakashi, she believes that Ayakashi are evil and dangerous, but Yū shows her that not all Ayakashi are Evil, in the end she develops a crush on him.

Yae Sakimori (咲守 八重, Sakimori Yae)
One of Kikuri's bodyguards, she is shy and fears men but even so she has a crush on Katsumi, when she fights uses a pair of gauntlets, with these she can fight hand to hand with Ayakashis like Akuro-ou.

Katsumi Osakabe (刑部 克己, Osakabe Katsumi)
One of Kikuri's bodyguards, he is calm and collected and always gives advice to Yū on how to handle Kikuri, he uses a Katana to fight, later is revealed that he is an Ayakashi user and that he wants to kill all the Ayakashi users, so they don't have to suffer the pain that his dead wife had to go through, he combines sword techniques with his wife's fire Ayakashi "Shiranui".

== Ayakashi ==
Ryuu (竜)
Yū's Ayakashi. It is the Ayakashi of destruction and rebirth.

Nurikabe (塗り壁)
Kajiwara's Ayakashi.

== Episode list ==
1. First Blood
2. Awakening
3. Remuneration
4. Ayakashi User
5. Him
6. Izumi
7. Isolation
8. Eimu
9. Decision
10. The Two
11. Path of No Return
12. Symbiosis
