= 21: Two One =

2001 video game

- Limited edition Dreamcast cover
- Developer: BasiL
- Publishers: BasiL (Windows); PrincessSoft (DC)
- Platforms: Microsoft Windows, Dreamcast
- Release: Microsoft Windows: JP: May 25, 2001; Dreamcast: JP: December 27, 2001
- Genre: Visual novel
- Mode: Single-player

21: Two One is a Japanese murder mystery visual novel developed by BasiL, it was first released as an adult PC game for Microsoft Windows on May 25, 2001. 21: Two One was later released for the Dreamcast by PrincessSoft on December 27, 2001. The game is the second installment by BasiL, and after the completion of 21: Two One, BasiL went on to create their third and final eroge, Cherry Petals Fall Like Teardrops, before forming a new company called Navel. The story follows a young man called Takuya Kirishima, who is a talented surgeon and works in a hospital with his childhood friend Seri Sakaki, however, one day a murder is committed at the hospital, and Takuya tries to solve the mystery. Gameplay in 21: Two One offers branching plot lines, and a multi-choice navigation, where the player can attain multiple endings.

21: Two One had good sales, premiering at No. 2 in the rankings, which took place in the second half of May 2001. The majority of the game's characters were designed and drawn by Aoi Nishimata. A special fan disc was given out as a preorder bonus and includes an additional scenario entitled 210: Two One Zero. Other media has been published, such as a light novel and original soundtrack.

== Gameplay ==
An example of the gameplay in 21: Two One. Here, Takuya is conversing with Mio Futami (right), and Mao Futami (left).

21: Two One is a romance and murder mystery visual novel where the player assumes the role of Takuya Kirishima, the main protagonist of the game. Much of its gameplay is spent reading the game's narrative and dialogue. Text is accompanied by character sprites, whom of which Takuya can converse with, over background art. Throughout the game, the player will encounter CG artwork, which replaces the background art and character sprites. The game follows standard visual novel gameplay, which means the player can attain various different endings, and depending on the decisions that the player makes during the game, the plot will progress in a specific direction. For example, in several instances in the game, when the player is conversing with another character, they will be given the following options: "Trust", "Normal", and "Suspicion" (comparable with L.A. Noire). This navigation will effect the ending the player receives.

Throughout gameplay, the player is given multiple options to choose from, and text progression pauses at these points until a choice is made. To view all plot lines in their entirety, the player will have to replay the game multiple times and choose different choices to further the plot to an alternate direction. The player will also encounter various background music (BGM) throughout the game, different BGMs will play depending on the atmosphere or tone of the scene. All characters are voiced in the game, with the exception of the protagonist, Takuya, and some side characters.

== Plot and characters ==
Takuya Kirishima (霧島 拓哉) is a talented surgeon who works in a hospital, he does this in order to help those in need. He decided to become a doctor after losing his mother. Takuya works alongside his childhood friend Seri Sakaki (榊 芹, voiced by: Ayako Kawasumi), who works as a nurse in the same hospital. She is the one person who understands Takuya's pain the most, and became a nurse to assist him. Seri is generally a high spirited, cheerful girl, but occasionally a little violent. Takuya also works alongside Momiji Kikyou (汽京 紅葉, voiced by: Kotono Mitsuishi), a medical doctor. She is a well mannered, positive thinker, and follows her mother's example, who was a talented doctor.

Takuya has two sisters, one being Mio Futami (二見 美魚, voiced by: Yura Hinata), and the other, Mao Futami (二見 真魚, voiced by: Miki Nagasawa). Mio is the gentle, and affectionate sister, who previously suffered from an unknown terminal illness. However, she is able to live normally as long as she no longer has fits. Mao is the other sister, but unlike her younger sister, she is unsociable and cold, however, she is also a hard worker, and is kind when she wants to be. Yuina Tachibana (橘 唯奈, voiced by: Satsuki Yukino) is another nurse who works in the hospital, her circumstance is similar to the protagonist, after the loss of her brother, she decided to become a doctor. She has a serious personality, and is very determined. Other characters include Konoha Ichinose (一ノ瀬 木葉, voiced by: Omi Minami), a mischievous little girl who is patient at the hospital, and Kasumi Mihara (三原 香澄, voiced by: Mayumi Iizuka), Konoha's energetic friend who often visits her in hospital.

One day, a murder is committed at the hospital, and since the event, various people start suffering from a strange, unknown disease. Takuya tries to search for the answer to why this is happening, in order to protect Seri.

== Development and release ==
21: Two One is BasiL's second project, after their first visual novel Bless: Close Your Eyes, Open Your Mind. Aoi Nishimata, Koma Toeji, and Satomi Hinako provided the character designs. Koma Toeja designed the two characters Konoha Ichinose, and Momiji Kikyou, Satomi Hinako designed Mihara Kasumi, a supporting character in the game, and Aoi Nishimata designed the rest of the characters. Ago Baria and Ou Jackson were the scenario writers for the game. Ago Baria worked on the main scenario, whilst Ou Jackson worked on the bonus scenario. Lastly, music was handled by Coldhand, KING, Yūji Naitō, and Atchorike. After 21: Two One, BasiL went on to create their final project Cherry Petals Fall Like Teardrops, before forming a new company called Navel, which would go on to creating successful visual novels like Shuffle! and Oretachi ni Tsubasa wa Nai.

BasiL released 21: Two One as a first press limited edition on May 25, 2001, and as a regular edition on June 8, 2001, for the PC. The PC game was distributed as two CDs, and is playable on Windows 98, Windows 2K, and Windows ME. On December 27, 2001, both regular edition and first press limited edition editions of the game were released for the Dreamcast by PrincessSoft, and another version of the Dreamcast port of the game entitled 21: Two One DreKore was released on October 31, 2002. 21: Two One DreKore is a Dorikore release, otherwise known as a Dreamcast Collection, which is a budget label given to re-released Sega Dreamcast games in Japan.

== Media ==
A special fan disc was released alongside the original game on May 25, 2001, as a preorder bonus by Messesan'o. It contains an additional scenario entitled 210: Two One Zero. The fan disc also includes tips and cheats, wallpapers, and a character viewer. A 238-page light novel adaptation (ISBN 4-434-01563-X), was published by Harvest on January 1, 2002, under their Harvest Novels imprint. It was written by Nikaido Kageyama, and illustrated by Aoi Nishimata, one of the main character designers for the game. On October 3, 2001, an original soundtrack for the game was published by CATS, and distributed by King Records. It contains one disc of 26 tracks, and the disc length in entirety is seventy three minutes and five seconds long. The track includes the opening theme, "TRUTH AND FATE", sung by Maiko Katsuta, and the ending theme, "DAYBREAK", sung by Nori.

== Reception ==
According to a sales ranking of bishōjo games conducted by PCNews, 21: Two One premiered at No. 2 in the rankings, which took place in the second half of May 2001. The game charted again and ranked at No. 2 during the first half of June 2001. Then, during the second half of June 2001, 21: Two One made one last charting appearance at No. 50.
