= Sakura Nogawa =

Japanese voice actress and singer (born 1978)

- 野川 さくら
- Born: March 1, 1978 (age 48); Toyohashi, Japan
- Occupations: Voice actress, singer

Sakura Nogawa (野川 さくら, Nogawa Sakura; born March 1, 1978) is a Japanese voice actress and singer. In August 2013, she took a break from voice acting and singing due to poor health and returned a year later. In February 2017, she announced that she had already changed the agency of Office Anemone.

== Filmography ==
- Tsubasa in Angel Tales
- Misha Arsellec Lune in Ar Tonelico: Melody of Elemia
- Misha Arsellec Lune in Ar Tonelico 2
- Gengorou, Nenesha in Ar Tonelico 2
- Fubuki Sakuragasaki in Arcade Gamer Fubuki
- Izumi Makihara in Ayakashi
- Kaorin in Azumanga Daioh
- Yuka-chan in Azumanga Daioh
- Kunugi-Tan in Binchō-tan
- Chako Hasegawa in Cosplay Complex
- Mei, Misha Arsellec Lune in Cross Edge
- Nemu Asakura in Da Capo
- Nemu Asakura in Da Capo Second Season
- Tsukasa in Daphne in the Brilliant Blue
- Masuda Shizuka in Final Approach
- Nana in Forza! Hidemaru
- Satoka Tachikawa in Gate Keepers 21
- Yukina in Girls Bravo
- Kaho Harui in Gokujō!! Mecha Mote Iinchō
- Aihara Nana in KimiKiss: Pure Rouge
- Cidre (Episode 1) in Jing: King of Bandits
- Arisugawa Yui, Sakaki Mizuki in Lovely Idol
- Ayumi Mamiya in Magikano
- Rokka Wan in Mamotte! Lollipop
- Philomel Hartung in Mana Khemia: Alchemists of Al-Revis
- Tarisa Manandal in Muv-Luv Alternative: Total Eclipse
- Shiho Munakata in My-HiME
- Shiho Huit in My-Otome
- Kuriko in Nanaka 6/17
- Hiroko Kaizuka (Episode 4, 11, 13) in Shadow Star
- Manaka / Yongo (Episode 3 & 10) in Narue no Sekai
- Michiko Takane in Otome wa Boku ni Koishiteru
- Cha Chi in Penguin Musume Heart
- Kaoru Mitarai in Pita Ten
- Cinccino in Pokémon
- Nono (Episode 8) in Popotan
- Ma in Pugyuru
- Kasugano Ray in Ray the Animation
- Miyuki Onizuka in Real Bout High School
- Aki-chan in RockMan.EXE (MegaMan NT Warrior)
- Hinaichigo in Rozen Maiden
- Hinaichigo in Rozen Maiden Ouvertüre
- Hinaichigo in Rozen Maiden Träumend
- Hinaichigo in Rozen Maiden: Zurückspulen
- White Iris in Rune Factory Frontier
- Tsubasa in Saint Beast
- Saishi (Episode 18, 21, 22) in Samurai Deeper Kyo
- Edomae Lunar in My Bride is a Mermaid
- Okuwaka Tsubomi in Strawberry Panic!
- Erica Hartmann in Strike Witches
- Erica Hartmann in Strike Witches 2
- Erica Hartmann in Strike Witches: 501st Joint Fighter Wing Take Off!
- Erica Hartmann in Strike Witches: Road to Berlin
- Peridot Hamilton in Tales of Hearts
- Nene Hampden in Tristia of The Deep Blue Sea
- Io Sakuragawa in True Tears
- Computer Voice in Ultra Maniac
- Nene Mikumo in Venus Versus Virus
- Young Ishizu Ishtar in Yu-Gi-Oh! Duel Monsters
- Leonie Pinelli in Fire Emblem Three Houses, Fire Emblem Warriors: Three Hopes, Fire Emblem Heroes
- Liseto Lander in Atelier Annie: Alchemists of Sera Island
- Asuka Hina in Memories Off 5: Togireta Film, Memories Off 5 the Animation
- Female Fighter in Granado Espada (Japanese version)

== Discography ==
=== Singles ===
- 2001-08-01: Soyokaze no Rondo
- 2002-01-26: Heart no Puzzle
- 2002-08-07: Hoshi no Furu Oka
- 2003-07-24: SAKURA Magic ~shiawase ni narou~
- 2004-10-27: Kimiiro Palette – anime television series Final Approach opening theme
- 2004-12-01: Joyeux Noël ~seinaru yoru no okurimono~
- 2006-01-25: Motto! – anime television series Magikano opening theme
- 2006-10-04: Dual Love on the planet ~Hanoka~ – anime television series Hanoka opening theme
- 2006-11-?: Install Your Heart – anime television series Mega Man Star Force (anime) opening theme
- 2008-10-22: Eternal Memory – Radio drama Thor Code opening theme
- 2009-05-23: Party Play – anime television series Arad Senki: Slap Up Party 1st opening theme
- 2009-08-05: Sokujin no Pandora – anime television series Arad Senki: Slap Up Party 2nd opening theme
- 2010-01-29: Last Stop
- 2010-07-28: Heavenly Days

=== Albums ===
- 2003-02-05: SAITA
- 2004-03-01: U.La.Ra
- 2005-03-24: PoTeChi
- 2005-08-03: Cherries – character & theme song best
- 2006-04-12: Tenohira no naka no Lupica
- 2007-08-01: Kazeiro Renpu
- 2010-08-25: Happy Harmonics

=== Live ===
- 2010-11-14: Live Tour 2010 ~Happy Harmonics~
