= Miwa Oshiro =

Japanese model (born 1983)

- Born: August 26, 1983 (age 43); Sapporo, Hokkaido, Japan
- Occupations: Gravure idol, actress
- Height: 1.54 m (5 ft 1/2 in)

Miwa Oshiro (大城 美和, born August 26, 1983) is a Japanese gravure idol and actress.

== Biography ==
Oshiro was born in Sapporo, Hokkaido, Japan on August 26, 1983, to an Okinawan father and mother from Hokkaido. She is best known for her appearances in films "Eiken" and "Hunabku".

== DVD Filmography ==
- Maui Densetsu (2001)
- Crazy for mie? (2001)
- Tele Tesa Angel Eye - Private Resort (2002)
- Final Beauty (2002)
- D-Splash! (2002)
- Treasure Vol 13 (2003)
- Miwa In Hawaii (2003)
- Cover Girls (2003)
- Nishojo Tanteidan - Asuka Kara No Kaze (2003)
- Miwa Oshiro -SuperCharge- (2003)
- Idol One: Perfume (2003)
- Se-Jo! Series A: Miwa Oshiro (2004)
- Silky Collection Se-Jo! 2 B (2004)
- Beach Angels - Miwa Oshiro in Belau (2004)
- A Day Off (2005)
- Tukkataa (2006)

== See also ==
- Rio Natsume
