= Seiji Matsuyama =

Japanese manga artist (born 1975)

Seiji Matsuyama (松山 せいじ, Matsuyama Seiji; born April 28, 1975) is a Japanese manga artist from Fukuoka Prefecture. He is known for drawing many works featuring women with extremely large breasts, and he himself refers to himself as a "boobie manga artist" in his doujinshi and other publications. He is married to fellow manga artist Sayu Matsuyama (松山 紗夕, Matsuyama Sayu).

== History ==
Matsuyama graduated from Fukuoka Daiichi High School and Yoyogi Animation Academy's Manga and Comic Professional Training Course. In 1994, he made his debut in Tokuma Shoten's Monthly MANGA BØYS and serialized his best-known work Eiken in Akita Shoten's Weekly Shōnen Champion in 2001. He also publishes doujinshi (completely new works, derivative works of The Idolmaster and other series, and spin-offs of existing works, including Eiken) under his own name (as an individual, but without a specific circle name).

In addition to his own works, he created the cover illustration for the Idolmaster comic anthology vol. 1 (Ichijinsha). He also drew an illustration for the introduction article of the Xbox 360 version of The Idolmaster in Weekly Shōnen Champion (issue #8, 2007).

As a result of a friendly relationship with Masahiko Ishikawa, a railfan and one of the creators of "Railworks" in Shogakukan, he created a manga about a female railfan, Tetsuko na Sanshimai, among others.

After working on Yuritetsu, which was in the same genre, Matsuyama changed his drawing style to a more shōjo manga-like touch, and began to expand his artistic style. His favorite station is Umi-no-Nakamichi Station (former station) on the Kashii Line, and his favorite Shinkansen is the 800 series.

On November 11, 2008, Matsuyama married Aine Kazuki (later known as Sayu Matsuyama), who drew storyboards for KimiKiss: After Days.

== Works ==
=== Manga ===
- Ura Kendou Zero
- Eiken (2001–2004)
- Zokusei (Jan. 2006-Aug. 2007)
- Okusama wa Shougakusei (Dec. 2006-Aug. 2008)
- Kotoko no Michi (2007)
- Bukkake (2007)
- Zen Mantoku from Black Jack 21 (2006)
- Yanhobo 2 (2009)
- Tetsukko na 3 Shimai (2009–2010)
- Jinsei: La Bonne Vie (2014–2015)
- Gal Tetsu (Dec. 2020 – Aug. 2022)

=== Illustrations ===
- Eiken (anime; end credit illustration)
