= Final Approach (video game) =

Japanese visual novel

ふぁいなる·あぷろーち (Fuainaru Apurōchi)
- Genre: Harem, romantic comedy
- Video game
- Developer: PrincessSoft
- Publisher: Oaks
- Genre: Visual novel
- Platform: PlayStation 2
- Released: October 7, 2004
- Anime television series
- Directed by: Takashi Yamamoto
- Written by: Katsumi Hasegawa
- Music by: Angel Note
- Studio: Zexcs
- Original network: KIDS Station
- Original run: October 3, 2004 – December 26, 2004
- Episodes: 13
- Video game

Finalist
- Developer: PrincessSoft
- Publisher: Oaks
- Genre: Visual novel
- Platform: PlayStation 2
- Released: January 26, 2006

Final Approach (Φなる·あぷろーち, Fuainaru Apurōchi) is a Japanese visual novel developed by PrincessSoft which was released on October 7, 2004. It has been adapted into an anime television series animated by Zexcs and aired from October to December 2004 with original character designs by Aoi Nishimata. The title uses the Greek letter Φ (phi) to represent to the "fi" (ふぁい, fai) in the Japanese transliteration of the English word "final". The series of half-length episodes aired in Japan in October 2004 (back-to-back with W~Wish, a separate series), with the last episode ending a few months later.

A PS2 adaptation of the series was exclusively released in Japan during October 2004. A sequel with different characters, called Finalist, was released a year later, in which each of the female characters was designed by different character artists.

== Storyline ==
The situation of Final Approach involves an experimental government operation (dubbed the "R.T.P." by Japanese Congress) to oppose the declining birthrates of Japan, circa this period in time. The primary decision (which is implied to be without the Japanese citizens' representation and approval) was to arrange a national project in which young citizens of opposite sexes are to be paired together in marriage, and therefore in parenthood. This, in theory of the story and in today's world, would produce an astonishing net increase in childbirth, if young couples were to begin having children during an early relationship.

While the economical and political gains are great, the social and emotional aspects of the "subjects" in the project are easily assumed adamant in defending the previous method of marriage. Thus, the Japanese government decided to test the project on an experimental level, i.e. with one couple at a time.

The Mizuhara siblings are the first to be chosen for the R.T.P. project. The brother and the sister, Ryo and Akane, have long been living together in the same apartment. Still in public school, the two have endured a difficult life after their parents' death some years back (their cause of death is unexplained); the siblings only managed their orphaned days within the hands of their young guardian, Haru, who they also work for in his café. Ryo, the main protagonist, has assured to himself that all is well; he and his sister are living on well-paid wages, and he only needs his sister. The vision of his future is soon to be shattered by the R.T.P. when his planned fiancée, Shizuka, enters his apartment one night with several government bodyguards. By some preliminary actions taken by the government (as precautions), Ryo is forced to house his new wife-to-be, despite his refusal.

The whole series continues from there, presenting the new day-to-day events of the Mizuhara siblings with Shizuka.

== Main characters ==
Ryo Mizuhara (水原涼, Mizuhara Ryo)

Voiced by: Daisuke Kishio (Japanese); Jordi Navarro (Spanish)

Ryo is a teenage boy in the 11th grade. Living with Akane since a young age, Ryo is seen as the ideal brotherly figure to his sister, to the extent of being humorously overprotective. When he met his fiancée for the first time, he refused to marry her, both on government basis and personal beliefs. Throughout the series (except the end), Ryo has always been in defiance to the arranged marriage, and he exercises that by rejecting Shizuka and her attempts to court him.

In trying to change Shizuka's mind about the marriage, Ryo has tried a few methods. One such method is dating one of his friends, Emiho. Shizuka dismisses it as an act, meant to change Emiho's mind on arranged marriages (because Emiho herself has an arranged marriage). In later episodes however, it is shown that Shizuka's approval is only a pretense for the emotional pain she is going through, caused by the sadness welling up inside her (mainly due to Ryo's relationship with Emiho). The façade did not last long; after being reprimanded by Ryo for invading the privacy of his relationship with Emiho (in which Shizuka did only to please Ryo; she was merely keeping track and taking care of their needs), the pretext starts to fade as Ryo begins to ignore all verbal and eye contact with Shizuka (Being as retribution/punishment or as another refusal method is up to debate). Ryo's silence to his fiancée also did not last long

The dating relationship between Ryo and Emiho dissolves after Emiho's rescue from her engagement meeting. Akane narrates that none of the two said they have stopped dating, but after the engagement meeting, Ryo and Emiho act normally as they did before the dating relationship. Ryo finally confirms feelings for Shizuka towards the end of the series, kissing her close to the end of episode 12.

Shizuka Masuda (益田西守歌, Masuda Shizuka)

Voiced by: Sakura Nogawa (Japanese); Maria Rosa Guillén (Spanish)

Shizuka is the fiancée of Ryo. She is in the 10th grade, but used "political power" to transfer herself to Ryo's 11th grade class. Her feelings and hopes for Ryo were confirmed when her fiancé began dating Emiho.

Shizuka is mostly Ryo's fiancée because of the Japanese government's secret childbirth program, but disclosures later on reveal that her grandfather has a hand in the matter. When her grandfather was young, he fell in love with a woman from a lower class, but they could not get married due to his parents' disapproval via class status. Instead, he married the woman his family picked. He eventually accepted and fell in love with his wife and forgot about his first love. When his wife died two years before the events of Final Approach, Shizuka's grandfather went back to reminiscing about his first love. After some research, he found out she had already died. In studying some more, he found out the woman had two grandchildren (who were Ryo and Akane), both of close ages to his grandchild. The grandfather, knowing this, asks Shizuka to marry Ryo, as a sign of realization of his lost love, which seems to be his only wish left in his lifetime. Shizuka, obeying and honoring her grandfather, carries on his request, despite her being unhappy at first with a forced marriage. Like Ryo, she at first did not want to be in a planned marriage where she didn't know who her spouse was. The reason Shizuka didn't tell Ryo about the story was because she thought he would pity her, a love relationship that Shizuka would not have been happy or satisfied with. Fortunately, Shizuka was in love with Ryo so deeply and strongly that she didn't care if Ryo pitied her or not. In the end, Ryo, realizing the real Shizuka and her passionate love, came to her hometown, fully accepting their marriage status from having developed so strong of feelings for his fiancée.

Akane Mizuhara (水原明鐘, Mizuhara Akane)

Voiced by: Miyu Matsuki (Japanese); Sofia Garcia (Spanish)

Akane is Ryo's sister, a gentle-minded girl attending the 10th grade class. After her parents died, she had since always look up to Ryo and developed a close affection for her brother based on dependency. Throughout the story, Akane doesn't seem to mind Shizuka and her engagement to Ryo (albeit at one time, she was afraid that Ryo would forget about her after he marries). A sisterhood between the two girls soon formed, in which Akane can perceive Shizuka's emotions and struggles.

In one episode when Akane falls ill to a cold, she reveals her deep reliance on Ryo via dreams bearing past memories and by brooding about the future where she believes Ryo might leave his sister for his new, demanding life. The fact that she fears this happening and that she finds happiness in her brother's presence may imply that Akane has diminutive amorous feelings for Ryo. In spite of what may be, Akane does not object to her brother's planned marriage (however, there is little evidence that she supports the engagement, thus placing her beliefs on the marriage as somewhat passive).

Emiho Mutsu (陸奥笑穂, Mutsu Emiho)

Voiced by: Chiaki Takahashi (Japanese); Lidia Camino (Spanish)

A female classmate and a friend of Ryo. She differs from most of the cast in that she has a collected personality and speaks with logic in mind.

Coming from a wealthy family, it wasn't long before Emiho was in a political marriage; Ryo felt a connection to her due to his similar situation. A relationship of interest was formed thereafter, in which Ryo tried to change Shizuka's mind on their engagement. Emiho herself discovered another perspective of love in her relationship with Ryo (in complement with her previous philosophy on arranged marriages and a person's will in it), during which she exhibits with feelings for Ryo. Their relationship ended after an incident with Emiho meeting her fiancé, though neither of them stated that they have broken up.

Miki Moriya (守屋美紀, Moriya Miki)

Voiced by: Yukari Tamura (Japanese); Mar Nicolas (Spanish)

A female classmate and a friend of Ryo. Spunky and sometimes hot-tempered, Miki slacks in schoolwork while aspiring to be an idol singer, preferably well known.

It is suggested that Miki. This is thought of during an episode where the cast is skiing on a mountain and becomes trapped in the ensuing blizzard. During the scene where the group is taking shelter within a log cabin, Shizuka recommends sharing body warmth as a source of heat. Miki, after concluding that Akane will be cared for by Ryo, proposes to Emiho to be her sharing partner, while hinting that homosexual acts will be involved. Later on, when the group settled themselves in a nearby hot spring, Miki compliments Akane about her smooth skin, and succeeds it with a poke on one of Akane's breasts (after which Miki "plays" with Akane).

Yurika Menō (芽生百合佳, Menō Yurika)

Voiced by: Yūko Minaguchi (Japanese); Carmen Calvell (Spanish)

A young waitress who works in a café known as Plavi. She is characterized as being kind and thoughtful, while of a beautiful complexion. While working for the café, she also secretly is the girlfriend of the manager, Mukasa Haruki a.k.a. Haru (who also happens to own the entire café). The end of the series sees the couple as being open about their relationship by being married.

While not involving herself, she however is able to persuade Ryo into reexamining his arranged marriage, and ultimately his feelings for Shizuka.

== Episode list ==
Final Approach has 13 episodes, with each episode lasting around 12 minutes (including the opening and the ending; this makes each episode lasting approximately 9 minutes.)

No.	Title	Original air date
1	"Panic Visit!! Pretty Girl of Love and Destiny!"; Transliteration: "Dai Suisan!! Ai to Shukumei no Bishōjo!" (Japanese: 大推参!! 愛と宿命の美少女!)	October 3, 2004
Ryo meets his planned fiancée, Shizuka, for the first time, and discovers the R.T.P. projects for arranged marriages everywhere.
2	"Great Explosive Debut!! Love and Adoration for the Transfer Student!"; Transliteration: "Dai Bakudan!! Ai to Kassai no Tenkōsei!" (Japanese: 大爆誕!! 愛と喝采の転校生!)	October 10, 2004
Ryo finds everlasting shock when Shizuka suddenly shows up in his school and advances into his 11th grade class.
3	"Great Crash!! Dragon and Tiger of Love and Ambition!"; Transliteration: "Gekitotsu!! Ai to Yabō no Ryūtora!" (Japanese: 激突!! 愛と野望の龍虎!)	October 17, 2004
Shizuka is introduced into her fiancé's workplace, the Plavi, where trouble ensues.
4	"A Great Decision!! The Departure to Love and Ambition!?"; Transliteration: "Dai Ketsudan!! Ai to Seiun no Funade!?" (Japanese: 大決断!! 愛と青雲の船出!?)	October 24, 2004
Emiho confesses that she too has a planned marriage, in which Ryo debates about a person's will in such unions.
5	"The Great Approach!? The Steamy Hell of Love and Death!"; Transliteration: "Dai Sekkin!? Ai to Shi no Yukemuri Jigoku!" (Japanese: 大接近!? 愛と死の湯けむり地獄!)	October 31, 2004
The main cast spends a day skiing on a mountain, in conjunction with Ryo and Emiho's date. When a blizzard starts getting worse, the group is forced to spend the day outliving the storm.
6	"A Great Shock!! The Result of Love and Sorrow!"; Transliteration: "Dai Shōgeki!! Ai to Kanashimi no Hate!" (Japanese: 大衝撃!! 愛と哀しみの果て!)	November 7, 2004
Another date is underway for Ryo and Emiho, but Shizuka decides to be "cautious" and prepares with the aid of the government's technology.
7	"A Great Tragic Love!! The Sleeting Snow of Love and Yearning"; Transliteration: "Dai Hiren!? Ai to Bojō no Mizore Yuki" (Japanese: 大悲恋!? 愛と慕情のみぞれ雪)	November 14, 2004
In practicing ignorance around Shizuka, Ryo is reproved for his action, and is given a chance to reevaluate his decision.
8	"A Great Fever!! An "Ah~n" for Love and Reminiscence"; Transliteration: "Dai Neppatsu!! Ai to Tsuioku no 'a~n'" (Japanese: 大熱発!! 愛と追憶の"あ〜ん")	November 21, 2004
Akane becomes ill and reflects on the life she's spent with her brother. Meanwhile Ryo goes through his school day overreacting about Akane's sickness.
9	"A Great Battle!! Beyond the Love and Gunfire!"; Transliteration: "Dai Kessen!! Ai to Jūgeki no Kanata" (Japanese: 大決戦!! 愛と銃撃の彼方)	November 28, 2004
Emiho meets her betrothed for the first time. Ryo, who has already showed his dislike towards arranged marriage, decides to enlist Shizuka to help bail Emiho out.
10	"A Great Execution!! The Summons of Love and Mercilessness!"; Transliteration: "Dai Hatsudou!! Ai to Mujou no Shōkanjou!" (Japanese: 大発動!! 愛と無情の召還状!)	December 5, 2004
Shizuka's bodyguards show up one night before she has to return to her old school to take exams. They deliver a message from her father, who demands that she leaves the whole marriage behind and comes home.
11	"The Great End!? The Hina Dolls of Love and Farewell"; Transliteration: "Dai Shuuen!? Ai to Wakare no Hinaningyō!" (Japanese: 大終焉!? 愛と別れの雛人形!)	December 12, 2004
Akane prepares a farewell dinner for Shizuka, and asks Ryo to dine alone with Shizuka "like good, old friends."
12	"Great Applause!! 'Idiot!' of Love and Blessing!"; Transliteration: "Dai ketsudan! Ai to Kassai no Baka Yarō!" (Japanese: 大決断!愛と喝采のバカ野郎!)	December 19, 2004
The absence of Shizuka begins to weigh on Ryo's mind as he tries to live each day normally after her departure. In the end he decides to go look for Shizuka.
13	"A Great Conflict!! The Wedding of Love and Glory"; Transliteration: "Dai Sōdatsu! Ai to Shukufuku no Wedingu" (Japanese: 大争奪!愛と祝福のウェディング)	December 26, 2004
The epilogue which showcases Shizuka moving into Haru's previous apartment, right next to the Mizuhara siblings' own apartment, and also shows a wedding commercial Emiho's brother is working on.

== Music ==
- OP (Opening song) Kimiiro Palette by Sakura Nogawa (3:57)
- ED (Ending song) Love, Fate, Love by Miyuki Hashimoto (4:42)
