= Tristia: Legacy =

Music video game developed by Kogado Studio

- Tristia of the Deep-Blue Sea

蒼い海のトリスティア
- Genre: Adventure, Fantasy, Mecha
- Video game
- Developer: Kogado Studio, Kumasan Team
- Publisher: Kogado Studio (PC); Nippon Ichi (PS2)
- Genre: Music video game, Visual novel
- Platform: PC, PlayStation 2, PSP
- Released: July 20, 2002 (PC); March 25, 2005 (PS2); August 9, 2012 (PSP); January 20, 2023 (Switch)
- Novel
- Written by: Syogo Mukai
- Illustrated by: Eeji Komatsu
- Published by: Enix
- Published: November 15, 2002
- Manga

Aoi Umi no Torisutia ~Nanaka no Hatsumei Koubou Nikki~
- Written by: Sakuya Yuki
- Published by: MediaWorks
- Magazine: Dengeki Daioh
- Original run: April 2004 – November 2004
- Volumes: 1
- Original video animation
- Directed by: Hitoyuki Matsui
- Studio: Ufotable
- Licensed by: NA: Pathfinder Pictures
- Released: April 23, 2004
- Episodes: 2
- Novel
- Written by: Takashi Aki
- Illustrated by: Kawase Yuki (ufotable)
- Published by: MediaWorks
- Published: November 10, 2005

Tristia: Legacy (Note: Japanese: 蒼い海のトリスティア, Hepburn: Aoi Umi no Torisutia; Tristia of the Deep-blue Sea) is a PS2, PSP, and PC game, developed by Kogado Studio. This game is part of the Deep-Blue series along with the sequel, Neosphere of the Deep-Blue Sky (蒼い空のネオスフィア) and Akatsuki no Amaneka to Aoi Kyojin. The story has been adapted into an OVA, and has been released with a title of "發明工坊" in China, Hong Kong, Taiwan, U.S.A., Russia, and Poland.

== Gameplay ==
Tristia of the Deep-Blue Sea is a simulation game in which the player's goal is to rebuild the city of Tristia. The player takes the role of Nanoca Flanka and must build an array of technological gadgets using schematics and various raw materials that can be encountered in-game, and sell them to people of Tristia. As new gadgets are introduced to the town, the town is able to produce a greater variety of items and gradually grows.

== Plot ==
Tristia was a beautiful seaside town that slowly fell into ruin and dilapidation after being invaded by a dragon ten years before the start of the game. The people of the town tried in vain to rebuild the city in the hopes of restoring it to its former glory. Hopeless, the people decided to send for Prospero Flanca, a legendary inventor who was well known for reviving many dying cities. They received an answer from Prospero, but to their confusion, it was a girl who arrived at the port of the town. That girl was Nanoca, Prospero's granddaughter, and she has been assigned to manage the renovation project.

== Characters ==
Nanoca Flanka (ナノカ・フランカ, Nanoka Furanka; voiced by Ayako Kawasumi)
The 14-year-old protagonist of Tristia and the player's character. She is the granddaughter of the renowned inventor Prospero Flanca. Prospero's name was well-known all over the world as an inventor and builder, and she is keen to uphold the name. She came from the Imperial Capital with Stuka, an artificial creature, and Tenzan, a mech-styled golem.
Faury Carat (フォーリィ・キャラット, Fōrī Kyaratto; voiced by Marina Ōno)
The young chairperson of the Carat Firm. She is fifteen years old, and is known as an unyielding and carefree person. She has been into many troubles since Nanoca came to town.
Nene Hampden (ネネ･ハンプデン, Nene Hanpuden; voiced by Sakura Nogawa)
A rich girl, 12 years old and classmate of Nanoca in the Imperial Capital Youth Academy. She came from the Hampden clan, a wealthy capitalist family from the capital. Nene adores Nanoca very much, and is the one who recommended Nanoca to the town for the mission.
Rafarew (ラファルー, Rafarū; voiced by Akane Tomonaga)
The mysterious girl who was found in a casket recovered from the sea in the vicinity of Tristia. Nothing much is known about her.
Stuka (スツーカ, Sutsūka; voiced by Jūrōta Kosugi)
Nanoca's watchdog and support.
Tenzan (テンザン; voiced by Daisuke Kirii)
A golem under the command of Nanoca. It is shaped like a mech.
Reygurett Kutanie (レイグレット・クタニエ, Reiguretto Kutanie; voiced by Kanoko Hatamiya)
The head priest in the Ryunant temple in the city of Tristia. She noticed the talent of Nanoca upon her arrival.
Val Whitley (ヴァル・ホイットリ, Varu Hoittori; voiced by Tarusuke Shingaki)
Deputy Mayor of Tristia and a childhood friend of Reygurett.
Mayor Giuliani (ズリアーニ市長, Zuriāni-shichō; voiced by Ryo Ueki / Syoto Kashii)
Mayor of Tristia. His name is almost certainly derived from the name of New York's former Mayor, Rudy Giuliani.
Arthur Griffen (アーサー・グリフェン, Āsā Gurifen; voiced by Hidetoshi Nakamura)
Imperial multi-millionaire that lends his financial support for the revival project in Tristia.
Panavia Tornado (パナビア・トーネード, Panabia Tōnēdo; voiced by Saeko Chiba)
Character who appears in the OVA and manga. Self-proclaimed rival of Nanoca since their years at the academy, always coming in second to Nanoca in every competition.

== Development and release ==
The opening and ending theme song of the game is "UP TO ME!!" by Sakura Nogawa, who voices the character of Nene Hampden.

For the 10th anniversary celebration, this game was re-released on the PSP on August 9, 2012. It was re-released as Tristia: Legacy on the Nintendo Switch & Steam in 2023.
