= Soul Link =

2009 video game

- Premium edition cover of Soul Link (DVD-ROM)
- Genre: Action, Drama, Military, Romance
- Video game
- Developer: Navel (Windows); Examu (PS2)
- Publisher: Navel (Windows); Interchannel (PS2); MangaGamer (Europe Windows)
- Genre: Eroge, Visual novel
- Platform: Windows (Soul Link); PlayStation 2 (Soul Link Extension)
- Released: December 17, 2004 (Windows); June 29, 2006 (PS2); December 28, 2009 (English edition)
- Anime television series
- Directed by: Toshikatsu Tokoro
- Music by: Hiroyuki Sawano
- Studio: Picture Magic
- Licensed by: NA: Discotek Media
- Original network: Chiba TV, KBS Kyoto, AT-X, Sun TV, TV Aichi, TV Kanagawa, Mie TV, TV Saitama
- Original run: April 11, 2006 – June 24, 2006
- Episodes: 12

Soul Link is a Japanese visual novel developed by Navel. It was originally released as an adult game for Windows on December 17, 2004. It centers on a group of military cadets' adventure aboard a space hotel called Aries.

An all-ages release of the original game, titled Soul Link Extension, was released in Japan for the PlayStation 2 on June 29, 2006. It contains additional material to supplement the removal of adult content.

Soul Link has also been adapted into several forms of media, including manga, light novels, drama CDs, and an anime television series.

An English version of the Windows game was released in December 2009 by MangaGamer. then later discontinued citing a change in management.

== Plot ==
In AD 2045, a group of military cadets attending the preparatory course of the Central Military Academy transfer to the space station Aries for zero-g training. This class of cadets includes Ryota Aizawa, Sayaka Nagase and Kazuhiko Nitta. Their training is interrupted when a terrorist group called "Hallarax" takes over the station. While the military successfully evacuates the civilians on board the station, Ryota and his group are trapped. Worse still, the boarding assault has left most of the military personnel dead, effectively leaving the cadets on their own.

An unexpected twist occurs when a mysterious virus is released within the station, which turns those infected into mindless creatures. This forces everyone, friend and foe alike, to work together to find a way off of the station alive.

== Characters ==
=== Main characters ===
Shuhei Aizawa (相澤 秀平, Aizawa Shūhei)

Voiced by: Tarō Herushī (PC), Kentarō Itō (anime Japanese & PS2)
Ryota's older brother, and the main protagonist of the first half of the story. Shuhei is a brilliant and talented soldier who skipped two grades in the Academy. He is well renowned and surpasses most soldiers in combat.
He is later revealed to possess perfect Sukyura cells, which enhances his healing capabilities. Although, unlike others who possess these cells, Shuhei does not turn into a mindless soldier. Cellaria was interested in him since he was able to fight off her control, and she intended to use him in order to create a superior being.

Ryota Aizawa (相澤 涼太, Aizawa Ryōta)

Voiced by: Koike Takezō (PC), Hideki Ogihara (anime Japanese & PS2)
The protagonist of the second half of the story. A third year cadet with a timid and kind personality. Ryota does not excel in any single subject, scoring slightly above average in most fields, unlike his older brother, Shuhei. The one thing he does excel in is leadership, which is put to the test throughout the story. Though it is hard for him, he does not let his heart get in the way of his decisions.
He is a childhood friend of Nao and later develops a crush on Sayaka.
By the end of his third year, Ryota becomes the hero who saved Earth, and is also elected student representative.

Sayaka Nagase (永瀬 沙佳, Nagase Sayaka)

Voiced by: Aiko Gōtokuji (PC), Yuki Masuda (anime Japanese & PS2)
Childhood friend of Ryota Aizawa.

Nao Morisaki (森崎 七央, Morisaki Nao)

Voiced by: Hitomi Nagasawa (PC), Kumi Sakuma (anime & PS2)
Shuhei's girlfriend. A passionate and kind personality. She is a medical student in the Academy.

Aki Nitta (新田 亜希, Nitta Aki)

Voiced by: Marina Ono (anime Japanese & PS2)
Kazuhiko Nitta's younger sister, she is even more adept at computer hacking than he is. Then siblings do not enjoy have an easy relationship and tend to argue whenever they see each other. This is the result of her realizing, several years before the present, that the older brother she looked up to was not serious about anything.
In the end, she and her brother get along, and she once again looks up to him.

Yuu Yamanami (ユウ＝ヤマナミ)

Voiced by: Midori (PC), Junko Shimakata (anime Japanese & PS2)
A passenger on the Aries Station. Quiet and mysterious. She was revealed to be a mercenary, hired by another faction of the terrorist group that boards the station.

Karen Tachibana (カレン＝タチバナ)

Voiced by: Mariya Kurata (PC), Yui Shōji (anime Japanese & PS2)
A terrorist, and former soldier, who is skilled in hand-to-hand combat as well as firearms. An enthusiastic personality, she may seem insubordinate, but she respects Gale and sees him as a father figure. She grows a liking for Kazuhiko and in the end, she is seen in a dress meeting up with him.

=== Secondary Characters ===
Kazuhiko Nitta (新田 和彦, Nitta Kazuhiko)

Voiced by: Shū Zuishō (PC), Takehito Koyasu (anime Japanese & PS2)
A brilliant computer specialist and hacker. He develops a rivalry with both Aizawa brothers, though he does have a high respect for Shuhei.

Cellaria Markelight (セラリア＝マーカライト, Seraria Mākuraito)

Voiced by: Nobuko Iwama (PC), Chiharu Tezuka (anime Japanese & PS2)
An instructor on the Aries Station, she appears to be very caring towards her students. She is later revealed to be the mastermind of the attack on the station. She ends up betraying the terrorists on the station and takes it over herself using her Sukyura soldiers. She is considered to be the perfect Sukyura being and controls those who possess Sukyura cells. She becomes intrigued with Shuhei since he is the only one of the Sukyura soldiers whom she cannot fully control. In the end, she is destroyed by Nanami.

Shigemichi Morimoto (森本 茂道, Morimoto Shigemichi)

Voiced by: Isamu Nagano (PC), Norio Wakamoto (anime Japanese & PS2)
A steward on the Aries Station. He takes care of all civilian passengers and acts as the general manager. He is revealed to be Sayaka's father, who had left her when she was just a child. Unfortunately, he is killed before being able to tell her himself.

Gale Lantis (ゲイル＝ランティス, Gairu Rantisu)

Voiced by: Kōji Okada (PC), Takashi Nagasako (anime Japanese & PS2)
Leader of the terrorist faction that boards the Aries Station. He dies buying time for Aya to escape.

Aya Sugimoto (杉本 亜弥, Sugimoto Aya)

Voiced by: Miya Serizono (PC), Mari Yoshida (remake ver.), Yoshino Nanjō (anime Japanese & PS2)
Sayaka Nagase's childhood friend. She is a bit clumsy but has a kind personality and is always cheerful.

Nanami Inatsuki (稲月 ななみ, Inatsuki Nanami)

Voiced by: Maki Izumi (PC), Natsumi Yanase (anime Japanese & PS2)
A strange and young girl found on the Aries Station. She is later revealed to be a creation of mixed Sukyura cells and human cells. Nanami is the result of when Shuhei and Nao consummated their relationship (in a way, she is their "child" and she calls Shuhei, 'father', and Nao, 'mother'). In the end, she destroys Cellaria, as she is the only person with the ability to counter Cellaria's ability to spread Sukyura cells.

== Adaptations ==
=== Novels ===
Three Soul Link novel adaptations have been released. Two are published by Soft Garage and one is an anthology collection published by Jive.

=== Manga ===
An anthology collection referred to as Twin Heart Comics Soul Link consists of manga relating to Soul Link by various artists and a manga adaptation titled Soul Link Signal Code: 0 was released on April 4, 2006.

=== Anime ===
A 12-episode anime adaptation by Picture Magic aired in Japan between April and June 2006. In 2017 Discotek Media released the series in North America on DVD after acquiring the license.
