= Eiken (manga) =

Japanese manga series

- First tankōbon volume cover

エイケン
- Genre: Sex comedy
- Manga
- Written by: Seiji Matsuyama
- Published by: Akita Shoten
- English publisher: NA: Media Blasters
- Imprint: Shōnen Champion Comics
- Magazine: Weekly Shōnen Champion
- Original run: April 26, 2001 – August 5, 2004
- Volumes: 18
- Original video animation
- Directed by: Kiyotaka Ōhata (1); Alan Smithee (Note: Credited on the Japanese DVD as "阿蘭墨©", which can be read as "アランスミシー" (the copyright symbol being read as the Japanese reading of the letter C), i.e. "Alan Smithee".) (2)
- Produced by: Atsushi Moriyama; Nobuhiro Ōsawa; Yūji Matsukura
- Written by: Tomoyasu Ōkubo
- Music by: Shō Goshima (Soft House Right Brain)
- Studio: J.C.Staff
- Licensed by: NA: AnimeWorks
- Released: June 25, 2003 – June 23, 2004
- Runtime: 30 minutes
- Episodes: 2
- icon

Eiken (エイケン) is a Japanese manga series written and illustrated by Seiji Matsuyama. It was serialized in Akita Shoten's shōnen manga magazine Weekly Shōnen Champion from April 2001 to August 2004, with its chapters collected in 18 tankōbon volumes. The story depicts the life of schoolboy Densuke Mifune after he is forced into the mysterious Eiken Club. It was adapted into a two-episode original video animation (OVA) produced by J.C.Staff. Both the manga and the OVA were licensed for English release in North America by Media Blasters.

== Plot ==
Densuke has just enrolled at the exclusive Zashono Academy. He is very eager to participate in extracurricular activities, but never expected to join the mysterious Eiken Club. Strangely enough, every other member is a busty co-ed, and many of the club's activities involve bikinis. But Densuke is not interested in anyone except for the shy and beautiful Chiharu Shinonome.

== Characters ==
Chiharu Shinonome (東雲 千春, Shinonome Chiharu)
Voiced by: Miwa Oshiro (Japanese); Stephanie Sheh (English)
The red-headed Chiharu is considered one of the most attractive girls at Zashono Academy. She is shy around boys, because she came from an all-girls school.
Densuke Mifune (三船 伝助, Mifune Densuke)
Voiced by: Akeno Watanabe (Japanese); Bryce Papenbrook (English)
A plain boy no one seems to notice, Densuke was forced into the Eiken Club after an accidental run-in with Chiharu, whom he develops a crush on. He eventually accepts his place in the club, despite being tormented by Kirika and the other mishaps that befall him, i.e. being beaten, violently crushed (Kirika, Yuriko) or electrocuted (Kyoko) by other members. Densuke is frequently forced to cross-dress by Kirika, a hobby of hers.
Kirika Misono (御園 霧香, Misono Kirika)
Voiced by: Masumi Asano (Japanese); Cindy Robinson (English)
Not much is known about Kirika, the purple-haired amazon that runs the Eiken Club. She likes putting Densuke in awkward situations for her amusement.
Komoe Harumachi (春町 小萌, Harumachi Komoe)
Voiced by: Marina Ōno (Japanese); Rebecca Forstadt (English)
The pink-haired Komoe is the youngest member of the Eiken Club at 11 years old, who dialogues with macromastia. Komoe is very clumsy, but always striving to do her best. Her clumsy mistakes often leave her exposed, and she has a habit of accidentally hurting and squashing Densuke when falling on him.
Grace Lin (グレース = 鈴, Gurēsu Rin)
Voiced by: Touko Itou (Japanese); Mona Marshall (English)
Grace is a blonde-haired British girl who was born and grew up in China. She comes from a fortune-tellers' family and her father is a successful world-class enterpriser, also she is also very good at acrobatics. She seems to have a bit of feeling for Densuke as in the original manga, her words with Densuke in the speech bubbles are often ended with love-hearts. In the English version, her name was romanized as Lynn Grace.
Kyōko Morooka (諸岡 京子, Morooka Kyōko)
Voiced by: Mai Kadowaki (Japanese); Rebecca Forstadt (English)
Kyoko is the small blue-haired girl who runs the science division of the Eiken Club, and would seem to be the second-in-command of the club. Despite her age, she looks a lot younger than she really is. She often hurts Densuke with her various inventions (rockets, electrocuters). In the English version, her name was romanized as Kyouko Morooka.
Yuriko Shinonome (東雲 百合子, Shinonome Yuriko)
Voiced by: Emi Yabusaki (Japanese); Jessica Gee (English)
Chiharu's energetic sister, she looks like a short-haired cheekier version of Chiharu. Despite being fully aware of Densuke and Chiharu's feelings for each other, Yuriko likes trying to get between them.
Advisory Teacher (顧問の先生, Komon no Sensei)
Voiced by: Chiemi Ishimatsu (Japanese); Kathy Keller (English)
Sensei is never named, though she is a teacher from Zashono Academy, she often laments the fact she always seems to go unnoticed by her students and peers, not to mention the fact that they never seem to remember her name. She has bright green hair. In the English version, she was simply called the Teacher.
Teddy (くまちゃん, Kuma-chan)
Teddy is a very shy young girl, who wears a giant bear suit most of the time. She has an older sister, who also wears a similar suit.
Miharu Shinonome (東雲 美八留, Shinonome Miharu)
Voiced by: Jun Shikano
Chiharu's cousin, who also has a crush on Densuke. Her timetable always seems to be occupied by many part-time jobs. Densuke eventually finds out that she is secretly funding detectives who promised to find her long-lost father who left almost without a word after the divorce (due to the bankruptcy of his factory).
Chō Ginten (銀天 蝶, Ginten Chō)
She is head of Zashono Academy's Committee of Student Accountants. She had mysteriously returned to the academy over a two year span with an immediate action of carrying out her own budget plan to forcefully cancel all the activities of all the clubs in the academy, despite all the dirty tricks she has in mind.
Hikaru Daizenji (大善寺 光, Daizenji Hikaru)
The ex-head of the Supernatural Club in Zashono Academy, a slim and weedy girl whose body is dotted with bandages from the countless bruises and wounds caused by falling due to fainting resulted by her anemia.
Keiko Shinonome (東雲 京子, Shinonome Keiko)
The mother of the Shinonome family.
Mikito Shinonome (東雲 三紀斗, Shinonome Mikito)
The younger brother of Chiharu. He first appears pretending to be Chiharu in order to test Densuke. He is practically Chiharu's twin, and it is hinted that he is interested in Densuke, whether that is true or not, is not known.
Shima Kurosawa (黒沢 志麻, Kurosawa Shima)
Voiced by: Takahiro Sakurai (Japanese); Grant George (English)
He is the champion of the previous academy tournament who has returned from America to win the heart of Chiharu Shinonome. He is aware of Densuke's feelings for her, and feels that competition is the only way to resolve the romantic triangle.

== Media ==
=== Manga ===
Written and illustrated by Seiji Matsuyama, Eiken was serialized in Akita Shoten's shōnen manga magazine Weekly Shōnen Champion from April 26, 2001, (Note: It started in the magazine's combined 22nd–23rd issue of 2001 (cover date May 17), released on April 26 of that same year.) to August 5, 2004. (Note: It finished in the magazine's combined 36th–37th issue of 2004 (cover date August 26), released on August 5 of that same year.) Akita Shoten collected its chapters in 18 tankōbon volumes, released from October 5, 2001, to November 20, 2004.

In North America, the manga was licensed by Media Blasters. They released 12 volumes from July 1, 2005, to September 17, 2008.

A manga remake using artificial intelligence art began serialization on Beaglee's Manga Ōkuni online platform on April 25, 2024.

=== Original video animation ===
A two-episode original video animation (OVA) adaptation produced by J.C.Staff was released on DVD from June 25, 2003, to June 23, 2004. The opening theme and ending theme, "Feel Like Our Days" and "Jewel's Memory", respectively, were both performed by Toko.

In North America, the OVA was licensed by Media Blasters. It was released on DVD on December 14, 2004, and on Blu-ray on July 31, 2020. It was added to Crunchyroll's catalog in September 2020.

== Reception ==
Eiken was panned by critics for being "obscene" and "lacking substance". Jason Thompson gave the manga a zero-star rating in his review of the series in his Manga: The Complete Guide, calling it "[a]ctual pornography disguised as romantic comedy pseudo-pornography".

Stig Høgset gave the anime a one-star review on THEM Anime Reviews, calling it "one of the most exploitative, demeaning anime titles I have ever seen". He went on say that "Eiken is like an hour-long nightmare of sexual innuendo of the creepy kind... you'll never find a bigger collection of 'wrong' anywhere else."

In Mania.com's reviews, Chris Beveridge gave the anime an "F", while Eduardo M. Chavez gave the first manga volume a "D+".
