= Ballad Collection (X Japan album) =

Compilation album by X Japan
- Released: December 19, 1997
- Genres: Progressive metal; symphonic metal
- Length: 75:10
- Label: Polydor

X Japan compilation chronology
B.O.X ~Best of X~ (1996)	Ballad Collection (1997)	X Japan Singles ~Atlantic Years~ (1997)

Ballad Collection is a compilation album released by X Japan on December 19, 1997. It compiles all the ballads Yoshiki wrote for the group. Songs by other members such as "Voiceless Screaming" by Taiji Sawada and Toshimitsu "Toshi" Deyama are not included. The album reached number 3 on the Oricon chart, and charted for 26 weeks. In 1998, with 566,160 copies sold was the 47th best-selling album of the year. It was certified platinum by RIAJ.

== Track listing ==
1. "Forever Love"
2. "Longing ~Togireta Melody~"
3. "Endless Rain"
4. "Crucify My Love"
5. "Alive"
6. "Say Anything"
7. "Unfinished"
8. "Tears"
9. "Forever Love" (Last Mix)
10. "The Last Song"
