= Cafe Little Wish =

2003 video game

- Original visual novel cover for Windows, featuring Karen (left) and Merun (right).
- Developer: Patissier
- Publishers: Digital Works (Windows); Princess Soft (DC, PS2)
- Platforms: Windows; Dreamcast; PlayStation 2
- Release: Windows: JP: February 14, 2003; Dreamcast: JP: May 29, 2003; PlayStation 2: JP: May 29, 2003
- Genres: Eroge, Visual novel
- Mode: Single-player

Cafe Little Wish (カフェ・リトルウィッシュ, Kafe Ritoru Wisshu) is a Japanese adult visual novel developed by Patissier and released on February 14, 2003 for Windows. It was later ported to the Dreamcast and PlayStation 2 consoles by Princess Soft. The story follows Leon, an amnesiac who has to work off his debt to Cafe Little Wish, after he engulfs everything in the cafe without paying any money.

Cafe Little Wish charted twice in the national top 50 for best-selling bishōjo games. The gameplay of Cafe Little Wish follows a branching plot line which offers pre-determined scenarios with courses of interaction, and focuses on the appeal of the five female main characters by the player character. In 2004, a sequel called Magical Tale was released. An art book and original soundtrack have also been released.

== Gameplay ==
Average dialogue and narrative in Cafe Little Wish depicting Merun (left) and Cerus (right).

Cafe Little Wish is a romance visual novel in which the player assumes the role of Leon. Much of its gameplay is spent on reading the story's narrative and dialogue. The text is accompanied by character sprites, which represent who Leon is talking to, over background art. Cafe Little Wish follows a branching plot line with multiple endings, and depending on the decisions that the player makes during the game, the plot will progress in a specific direction.

There are five main plot lines that the player will have the chance to experience, one for each of the heroines in the story. Throughout gameplay, the player is given multiple options to choose from, and text progression pauses at these points until a choice is made. To view all plot lines in their entirety, the player will have to replay the game multiple times and choose different choices to further the plot to an alternate direction.

== Plot ==
=== Story ===
Cafe Little Wish takes place in a rural kingdom, with a small town along the highway. Fantasy elements such as magic and fictional species are included the visual novel. Its prologue shows a starving young man enter a small cafe named "Cafe Little Wish". Without knowing that he has no money, he engulfs all the food in the cafe. Before the man is able to commit a dine and dash, he is attacked by the waitresses. They realize that he has amnesia and is suffering a fatal case of memory loss, causing him to not remember anything about himself. Ceres, the owner of Cafe Little Wish, generously allows him to pay off his debt by working at her cafe. As he can no longer remember his own name, he is furthermore referred to as "Leon (レオン") by everyone. The story mostly revolves around Leon interacting with the five heroines and eventually forming a romantic relationship with one.

=== Heroines ===
Merun (メルン)
Voiced by: Sakura Ichinomiya
One of the waitresses in Cafe Little Wish. Merun has an energetic, and quirky personality. She has a classic tsundere personality, and constantly quarrels with the protagonist. As she is always trying to compete with Leon, Merun finds it difficult to be nice to him. Merun is generally outspoken, but whenever she notices one of Leon's good qualities, she doesn't like to admit it.

Lily (リリィ)
Voiced by: Mai Akizuki
A waitress in Cafe Little Wish. Lily is a shy and timid dojikko who is close with the cafe staff, thinking of them as the family she never had. Because Lily has always wanted a brother, this earns Leon the nickname "onii-chan" from her. She unknowingly has terrible-tasting cooking. One of Lily's hobbies include writing romantic poetry.

Mina (ミーナ)
Voiced by: Sakura Kyouko
Mina is a waitress in Cafe Little Wish, and a nekomimi with superhuman strength, albeit her small size. She has a positive outlook on life, and has a polite personality. However, she is able to insult Leon maintaining her sweet tone. Mina has a very big fear of bugs, despite how strong she is. Mina came first in the character popularity poll for Cafe Little Wish.

Ceres (セレス)
Voiced by: Pochi Uchino
Ceres is the laid-back and selfless owner of Cafe Little Wish. She inherited the cafe when her brother died, including a recipe book that causes magical things to happen. When it is revealed that Leon has amnesia, she sympathizes with him and allows him to work at her cafe. When Ceres drinks alcohol, she becomes a lot less responsible.

Karen (カレン)
Voiced by: Yuuka Misaki
A girl who is searching for someone, that someone is Leon, according to her. Karen starts working at Cafe Little Wish in order to jog Leon's memory, as she apparently knows him. She is rather domineering, and protective of Leon. Karen is revolted by the way he is treated in the cafe by other workers, Merun in particular; this causes fights between Karen and Merun.

== Development and release ==
Cafe Little Wish is Patissier's first visual novel to produce. After the development of Cafe Little Wish, they went on to make a sequel of sorts called Magical Tale, which shares the same setting. The company went defunct shortly afterwards. The game's scenario was written by Kaze, and the music arranged by Hideshi Saito. Cafe Little Wish's original character designs were by Tinkle, who is known for her illustrations in the Ro-Kyu-Bu! light novels. Digital Works, currently better known as Digital Works Entertainment, assisted in the development and launch of Cafe Little Wish. A fully voiced trial version was made available through internet download on November 28, 2012.

Digital Works released a first press edition of the game for Windows PCs as a CD-ROM on February 14, 2003. Cafe Little Wish for PC is compatible up to Windows 98/Me/2000/XP. A 44-page art book containing Cafe Little Wish character illustrations comes bundled with the first press release as a bonus. In the original version of the game, there are scenes with sexual CGs depicting Leon and a given heroine having sex. Later, Princess Soft ported Cafe Little Wish to the Dreamcast and PlayStation 2 consoles without the adult content; both ports were released on May 29, 2003. The PS2 port which is titled "Cafe Little Wish: Mahou no Recipe" (カフェ ・ リトルウィッシュ ～魔法のレシピ～; lit. Cafe Little Wish ~Magic Recipe~) was released in both limited and regular editions.

== Soundtrack ==
Cover of the Cafe Little Wish Sound Collection - Parfait Little Wish CD, featuring Mina.

Digital Works released an original soundtrack called "Cafe Little Wish Sound Collection - Parfait Little Wish" (Cafe Little Wish サウンドコレクション ぱふぇりとるうぃっしゅ, Kafe Ritoru Wisshu Suando Korekushon Pafe Ritoru Wisshu) on March 16, 2003. The CD has twenty tracks, including a mini audio drama. Cafe Little Wish's opening song is "Cafe LittleWish" sung by Maki Yuzuki; the ending song is "A Melody That Will Arrive Someday" (いつか届くメロディー, Itsuka Todoku Merodī) sung by Nobuko Miura.

Cafe Little Wish Sound Collection - Parfait Little Wish
No.	Title	Length
1.	"Cafe LittleWish"	4:11
2.	"Love is a Sandwich" (恋はサンドウィッチ Koi wa Sandōwitchi)	2:28
3.	"Earl Grey Flavor" (アールグレイ・フレーバー Āru Gurei Furēbā)	1:56
4.	"Dancing Mille-feuille" (踊るミルフィーユ Odoru Miru Fīyu)	2:14
5.	"Marshmallow on a Moonlit Night" (月夜のマシュマロ)	2:32
6.	"Madeleine's Season" (マドレーヌの季節 Madorēnu no Kisetsu)	1:45
7.	"The Usual Scenery" (いつもの風景 Itsumo no fūkei)	2:23
8.	"We're Open!" (ただいま営業中! Tadaima Eigyōchū!)	2:09
9.	"Elegant Sachertorte" (優雅なるザッハトルテ Yūganaru Zahhatorute)	3:39
10.	"Red Hot Chili Pepper" (熱き血潮のホットチリペッパー Atsuki Chishio no Hotto Chiri Peppā)	2:45
11.	"Valentine Kiss" (バレンタイン・キッス Barentain Kissu)	1:43
12.	"Pesci Mignon ~Sweet Smelling Crime~" (ペシエ・ミニヨン～甘く香る罪～ Peshie Miniyon ~Amaku Kaoru Tsumi~)	3:45
13.	"Slapstick Pudding" (スラップスティック・プディング Surappusutikku Pudingu)	1:43
14.	"Cafe LittleWish (Orgel Version)" (Cafe・LittleWish(オルゴールバージョン) Kafe LittleWish (Orugōru Bājon))	2:56
15.	"Wondrous Recipe" (不思議なレシピ Fushigina Reshipi)	1:45
16.	"Bittersweet Memory" (ビタースイート・メモリー Bitāsuīto Memorī)	3:11
17.	"A Melody That Will Arrive Someday" (いつか届くメロディー Itsuka Todoku Merodī)	4:23
18.	"Cafe LittleWish (Karaoke)" (Cafe・LittleWish(カラオケ))	3:58
19.	"A Melody That Will Arrive Someday (Karaoke)" (いつか届くメロディー(カラオケ) Itsuka Todoku Merodī (Karaoke))	4:23
20.	"Mini Drama "Each Obstinate One"" (ミニドラマ「懲りない面々」 Mini Dorama "Korinai Menmen")	13:59
Total length:		68:46

== Reception ==
Cafe Little Wish: Mahou no Recipe

Review score
Publication	Score
Famitsu	18 / 40

According to a national sales ranking of bishōjo games sold in Japan, the PC release of Cafe Little Wish premiered at No. 12. Cafe Little Wish charted further in mid-February 2003 and ranked No. 28. The Japanese video game magazine Famitsu reviewed the PlayStation 2 port of the game Cafe Little Wish: Mahou no Recipe, and gave it a total review score of 18/40 (out of the four individual review scores of 4, 5, 4, and 5). On the Cafe Little Wish official website, a character popularity poll was held, with a total of 2003 votes (Merun: 260 votes, Lily: 452 votes, Mina: 815 votes, Ceres: 125 votes, Karen: 351 votes). Mina won the contest with 815 votes, Lily came second place having gathered 452 votes; as a reward, they were featured on the regular PS2 game package art together.
