= X Singles =

Compilation album by X Japan
- Released: November 21, 1993
- Genre: Heavy metal, power metal, speed metal, symphonic metal, glam metal
- Length: 77:34
- Label: Ki/oon

X Japan compilation chronology
X Singles (1993)	B.O.X ~Best of X~ (1996)

X Singles is a compilation album released by X Japan on November 21, 1993. It collects all the singles, and their B-sides, released by the band while still named "X" and under contract with CBS/Sony. The album reached number 2 on the Oricon chart, and charted for 35 weeks. In 1994, with 427,860 copies sold, it was the 36th best-selling album of the year. It was later certified Million by the RIAJ. In 2014, Sony Music Japan released a remastered version.

== Track listing ==
1. "Kurenai"
2. "20th Century Boy" (Live) (T.Rex cover)
3. "Endless Rain"
4. "X" (Live Version)
5. "Week End" (New Arrange Version)
6. "Endless Rain" (Live Version)
7. "Silent Jealousy"
8. "Sadistic Desire" (New Version)
9. "Standing Sex"
10. "Joker" (Edited Version)
11. "Say Anything"
12. "Silent Jealousy" (Live Version)
