= Special Box =

Compilation album by X Japan
- Released: December 25, 1997
- Genre: Heavy metal, progressive metal, rock
- Label: Atlantic

X Japan compilation chronology
X Japan Singles: Atlantic Years (1997)	Special Box (1997)	Single Box (1997)

Special Box is a compilation album released by X Japan on December 25, 1997. It contains two CDs, Art of Life and Dahlia. The album reached number 96 on the Oricon chart.

== Track listing ==
Disc 1

1. "Art of Life"

Disc 2

1. "Dahlia"
2. "Scars"
3. "Longing ~Togireta Melody~"
4. "Rusty Nail"
5. "White Poem 1"
6. "Crucify My Love"
7. "Tears"
8. "Wriggle"
9. "Drain"
