= Eternal Melody II =

Studio album by Yoshiki
- Released: March 23, 2005
- Recorded: Extasy Recording Studio, O'Henry Sound Studios, Paramount Pictures Studio
- Genre: Classical
- Length: 77:01
- Label: Nippon Columbia
- Producer: Yoshiki

Yoshiki chronology
Yoshiki Selection II (1996)	Eternal Melody II (2005)	Yoshiki Classical (2013)

Eternal Melody II is the second classical studio album by Japanese musician Yoshiki. It was released on March 23, 2005.

== Overview ==
In 1993, Yoshiki recorded his first classical studio album, Eternal Melody, in London at the studios owned by English record producer Sir George Martin, who produced and co-arranged the album, with the music performed by the London Philharmonic Orchestra. It mostly included orchestral arrangements of songs from his band X Japan.

This second album was recorded in the Los Angeles County, California; in his own Extasy Recording Studio, O'Henry Sound Studios, and Paramount Pictures Scoring Stage M facility. All songs were written and composed by Yoshiki.

=== Composition ===
The albums contains two songs from his first single "Amethyst", the title track and "Ima wo Dakishimete". The second song was also released as a single in karaoke adaptation, in 1994 was the 35th annual best-selling single, and won the "Excellence Award" at the 36th Japan Record Awards. There are two orchestral arrangements of X Japan's songs "Longing" and "Forever Love", studio versions of songs from Yoshiki's symphonic concerts held in 2002, and the new song "Without You".

It also includes songs by his solo project Violet UK, "Unnamed Song" and "Red Christmas". The first features female singer Daughter, who performed it in his concerts in 2002. The song "I'll Be Your Love" could possibly belong to his solo project as it was also performed for the first time in 2002, sung by Nicole Scherzinger. However, the song was released in 2003 as the debut single for American-Japanese female singer Dahlia, and was used as the theme song for the world fair Expo 2005, held in Japan, where Yoshiki conducted the orchestra in the opening ceremony.

The album also includes; an orchestrated version of, one of the few songs he contributed while in Tetsuya Komuro's pop band Globe, "Seize the Light", the theme song "Kimi Dake Dakara" for the TV NHK's 50th anniversary commemorative broadcast, and the song "Anniversary" which he composed and performed at the request of the Japanese government at a celebration in honor of the tenth anniversary of Emperor Akihito's enthronement in 1999.

=== Release ===
The album was released on March 23, 2005, by Nippon Columbia. It debuted in third place on the Oricon daily charts, and reached number fourteen on the weekly chart in the initial counting week of April, with sales of 16,241 copies, and charted for six weeks.

== Track listing ==
All tracks are written by Yoshiki.

Disc one
No.	Title	Length
1.	"Unnamed Song"	4:28
2.	"Seize the Light (Classic Version)" (originally by Globe)	6:40
3.	"Without You (Classic Version)"	17:43
4.	"Longing" (originally by X Japan)	5:03
5.	"World Expo "I'll Be Your Love""	9:03
6.	"Kimi Dake Dakara"	5:12
7.	"Red Christmas (Classic Version)"	7:22
8.	"Ima wo Dakishimete (Classic Version)"	5:24
9.	"Forever Love (Classic Version)" (originally by X Japan)	8:46
10.	"Anniversary" Piano Concert in C minor"	7:20
Total length:		77:01

Hidden track
No.	Title	Length
1.	"Amethyst"	5:02

== Recording personnel ==
- Piano & harpsichord: Yoshiki
- Vocals: Daughter (T-1)
- Orchestra arrangement: Yoshiki, Shelly Berg, Ikurō Fujiwara, Dick Marx
- Recording engineer: Steve Churchyard, Tar Miller, Hideaki Okuhara, Suga Takao
- Mixing engineer: Joe Chiccarelli, Steve Schurchyard, Rich Breen, Suga Takao
