= Eternal Melody =

Studio album by Yoshiki
- Released: April 21, 1993; December 27, 2001
- Recorded: February 1993; Air Studio, London
- Genre: Classical
- Length: 75:38
- Labels: Toshiba-EMI, Polydor
- Producer: George Martin

Yoshiki chronology
| Yoshiki Selection (1991) | Eternal Melody (1993) | Yoshiki Selection II (1996) |

Singles from Blue Blood
- 1. "Amethyst" Released: November 3, 1993

Alternative cover
- 2001 re-release cover

Eternal Melody is the first classical studio album by Japanese musician Yoshiki. It was released on April 21, 1993.

== Overview ==
In 1991, Yoshiki released his first album, classical compilation Yoshiki Selection, which included various classical works together with orchestral arrangements of songs by his band X Japan. In 1992, inspired by Keith Jarrett's album The Köln Concert, he began learning about jazz improvisation and orchestration.

Eternal Melody was recorded in February, 1993, at the Air Lyndhurst Hall recording studio in London, owned by English record producer Sir George Martin, and mastered at Abbey Road Studios. The music was written by Yoshiki, produced by George Martin, co-arranged with Gavin Greenaway and Graham Preskett, and performed by the London Philharmonic Orchestra.

Besides including orchestral arrangements of previously released X Japan songs, the album also contains two new songs, "Tears ~大地を濡らして~" (Theme song for the 43rd NHK Kouhaku Utagassen) and "Amethyst".

Eternal Melody was followed by Eternal Melody II in 2005.

=== Release ===
The album was released on April 21, 1993, by Toshiba-EMI. It reached number six on the Oricon charts in the first week of May, selling 83,740 copies. The following week, it dropped to number nine, with 31,940 copies sold, and in the third week it dropped to number fourteen, with 15,050 copies sold. In the fourth week, it dropped to number twenty five, selling 9,030 copies. The album charted for six weeks in total. It was re-released on December 27, 2001, by Polydor.

On July 24, 2026, Eternal Melody was released on digital platforms worldwide. The digital release, remastered by Grammy Award–winning engineer Gavin Lurssen, contained two bonus tracks – "Anniversary" and "Forever Love" – recorded live at Yoshiki's sold-out Carnegie Hall concerts in 2017.

==== Singles ====
On November 3, "Amethyst" was released as a single, with "Ima wo Dakishimete (Classical version)" as the coupling track. It was released by Toshiba-EMI, as the single of London Philharmonic Orchestra, and co-produced by George Martin.

On November 10, X JAPAN single "Tears (X JAPAN version)" was released that also included the classical version taken from this album

"Ima wo Dakishimete" was originally a single written by Yoshiki for the group NOA, also released on November 3 by BMG Japan, that was used as the theme song for TBS drama Tetteiteki ni Ai wa..., and co-produced with drama director Endo Tamaki (from TBS).

In the third week of November, the singles reached number five and three on the charts, with sales of 74,740 and 85,610 copies, respectively. They charted for five and eighteen weeks, respectively. In 1994, "Ima wo Dakishimete" was the 35th annual best-selling single, with sales of 581,610 copies, and won the "Excellence award" at the 36th Japan Record Awards.

The song "Amethyst" was included in his second classical compilation, Yoshiki Selection II, and with "Ima wo Dakishimete" in his second classical studio album, Eternal Melody II.

== Track listing ==
All music is composed by Yoshiki, and arrangers noted.

Disc one
| No. | Title | Length |
|---|---|---|
| 1. | "Overture" | 9:13 |
| 2. | "Vanishing Love" (Graham Preskett) | 4:54 |
| 3. | "Amethyst" (Graham Preskett) | 6:18 |
| 4. | "Kurenai" (Graham Preskett) | 4:43 |
| 5. | "Endless Rain" (George Martin) | 6:17 |
| 6. | "Unfinished" (Gavin Greenaway) | 6:30 |

Disc two
| No. | Title | Length |
|---|---|---|
| 7. | "Say Anything" (Gavin Greenaway) | 10:07 |
| 8. | "Silent Jealousy" (Graham Preskett) | 4:59 |
| 9. | "A Piano String in Es Dur" (Gavin Greenaway) | 3:36 |
| 10. | "Week End" (Graham Preskett) | 5:55 |
| 11. | "Rose of Pain" (Gavin Greenaway) | 7:34 |
| 12. | "Tears" (George Martin) | 4:24 |

== Recording personnel ==
- Arrangers: George Martin, Gavin Greenaway, Graham Preskett
- Recording, mixing engineer: Bendoru Hayden
- Assistant engineers: Steve Orchard, Jeff Foster
- Mastering engineer: Chris Blair (Abbey Road Studios)
- Performed: London Philharmonic Orchestra
