= Say Anything (X Japan song) =

1991 single by X Japan

Single by X

from the album Jealousy
- Released: December 1, 1991
- Recorded: November 12, 1991 at Yokohama Arena (track 2)
- Genre: Progressive metal; symphonic metal
- Length: 16:28
- Label: Sony
- Songwriter: Yoshiki
- Producer: X

X singles chronology
"Standing Sex" (1991)	"Say Anything" (1991)	"Tears" (1993)

"Say Anything" is a single released by X Japan on December 1, 1991. It reached number three on the Oricon Singles Chart and has sold over 400,000 copies.

== Summary ==
It is the band's last single released under the name X and the last to feature Taiji on bass. The B-side is a live version of "Silent Jealousy", recorded on November 12, 1991, at Yokohama Arena. Both songs were originally featured on the album Jealousy.

A cover of the title song appears on the album Global Trance 2, by the pop band Globe, of which Yoshiki was briefly a member. It was also used as the theme song for the TV drama Lullaby Keiji (ララバイ刑事).

== Commercial performance ==
The song reached number three on the Oricon Singles Chart, and charted for 25 weeks. In December 1991, it was certified Gold by the RIAJ for sales of 200,000 copies. This number doubled in three months, when it was certified Platinum for sales of 400,000 in March 1992.

== Track listing ==
All tracks are written by Yoshiki and arranged by X.

No.	Title	Length
1.	"Say Anything"	8:39
2.	"Silent Jealousy (Live Version)"	7:49

== Personnel ==
X

- Toshi – vocals
- Pata – guitar
- hide – guitar
- Taiji – bass
- Yoshiki – drums, piano

Other

- Co-Producer – Naoshi Tsuda
- Mixed by – Rich Breen
- Art Direction and Design – Mitsuo Izumisawa
- Cover Photography – Hitoshi Iwakiri
- Artist Photography – Hideo Canno
