= Untitled X Japan album =

Unreleased studio album by X Japan

Untitled

Studio album by X Japan
- Recorded: 2008–2018
- Studio: Extasy, Los Angeles, California; Capitol, Los Angeles, California; Sound City, Tokyo, Japan
- Language: English, Japanese

X Japan chronology
Dahlia (1996)	Untitled (TBA)

The untitled X Japan album is an unreleased studio album by Japanese heavy metal band X Japan. Initially planned to be half new songs and half re-recordings of old songs, this was abandoned at some point in its 10 years of production in favor of all new material. Several different release dates were announced in that time, but the album remains unpublished despite drummer and bandleader Yoshiki confirming its completion in September 2018. However, several songs reported to be on it have been made commercially available digitally. If released, it would have been X Japan's first album of new material in approximately 30 years, their first since reuniting in 2007, and their first to feature newest member Sugizo. It also would have been the last to feature longtime bass player Heath, due to his death in 2023.

== Background and recording ==
X Japan disbanded after December 31, 1997 as vocalist and co-founder Toshi decided to leave the band, stating that the glamorous, success-oriented life of a rock star failed to satisfy him emotionally, as opposed to a simpler life and career. However, about twelve years later he would confirm what was long-reported in the media; that he was "brainwashed" by a group via violence and abuse and conned out of money, which eventually lead to bankruptcy. About four months after X disbanded, guitarist hide died on May 2, 1998. Prior to his death, he and the band's drummer and co-founder Yoshiki had talked about restarting X Japan with a new vocalist in the year 2000.

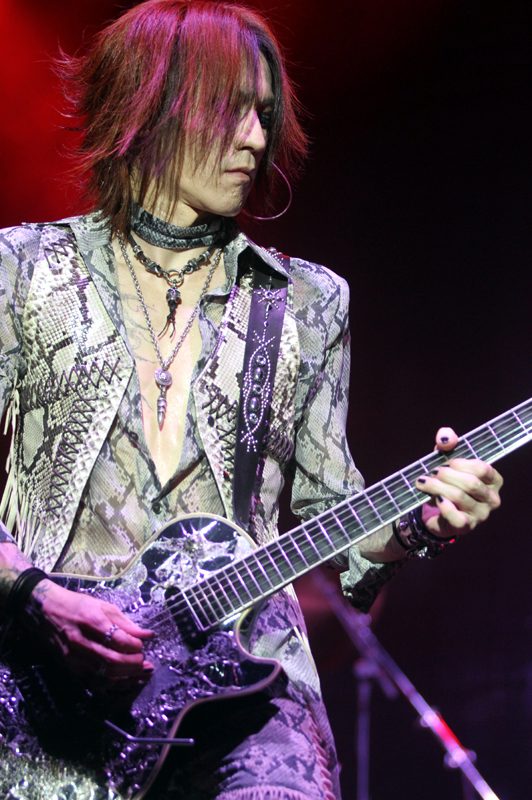
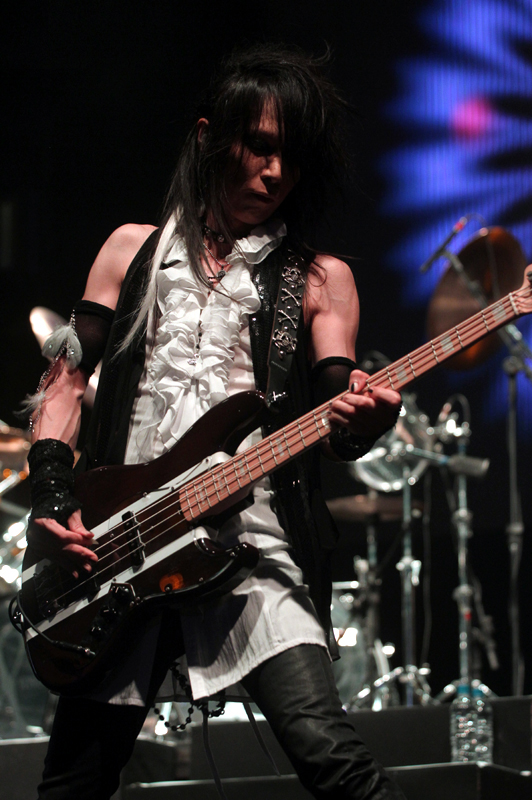
The album will be the band's first with Sugizo (left), who joined them in 2009, and the last with Heath (right), who died in 2023.

The surviving members of X Japan, Yoshiki, guitarist Pata and bassist Heath, reunited with Toshi and made their first public appearance on October 22, 2007, on the rooftop of the shopping center Aqua City in Odaiba, Tokyo, to film a music video for a new song, "I.V.". Written to be the theme of the American horror movie Saw IV, the song utilizes previously unreleased guitar tracks by hide. Talks of a new album began in 2008, although this was initially reported to be a compilation album of old material with two new songs, "I.V." and "Without You".

After the band started recording material, Yoshiki said he felt like the 10 years apart was necessary, "When you keep going on and on, you take everything for granted. We learned the very hard way how lucky it was for us to be playing music together." After he provided live support at concerts for about a year, it was announced that Luna Sea guitarist Sugizo had officially joined X Japan on May 1, 2009. In 2010, Natalie reported that recording of an album composed of old and new songs was being done at a rapid pace. They wrote that starting in March, work was being done 24-hours a day at multiple studios with multiple engineers in order to finish by June for a summer 2010 release. It was also reported that newest member Sugizo had written some songs for the new album. Yoshiki said that he asked Sugizo to play some "dramatic" guitar solos and commented that the guitarist was "almost co-producing" because he likes to be in the studio.

Reportedly, the album was largely recorded at Yoshiki's personal studio in Los Angeles and mixed by engineer Chris Lord-Alge. Prior to 2012, this was Extasy Recording Studios, but Yoshiki sold the studio that year. His current studio is the former Larrabee East. In addition to the drummer having made several trips to Japan to record with the rest of the band there, some of the album was also recorded live over the Internet between L.A. and Japan.

During a Q&A session on Reddit's r/IAmA in March 2016, Yoshiki said that members of the Japanese metal band Dir En Grey would be singing the chorus on some of the album. American musician Marilyn Manson also appears on one of the songs. Yoshiki also explained on Reddit that due to Pata being hospitalized that year, other members of X including himself were trying to record his guitar parts.

== Themes ==
X Japan's new album was originally announced to be half new songs and half old songs newly recorded in English. In 2010, old songs said to have been re-recorded in English for the album included "Kurenai", "Art of Life", "Tears" and "Rusty Nail". However, this was eventually abandoned at some point in favor of entirely new material as Yoshiki said it did not feel right. Because it is the band's first record targeting a worldwide audience, "99% of the songs are in English." Yoshiki has questioned the reasons for making a full album in the era of streaming, but decided to make one with X Japan and "put an end" to the "era of the album". He also expressed hope that the album would contribute in bringing rock music back into the mainstream.

Yoshiki said he wants it to be a meaningful album, and not just a collection of individual songs. He stated that the album's lyrics have a variety of themes, but the main one is "life." He has also described the album as being inspired by or a tribute to the band's deceased former members, hide and Taiji.

In 2010, Yoshiki claimed that their new material was "pretty much the same [as their old work], maybe a little edgier." However, four years later he specifically stated it will not be the same as before, adding that it will be very heavy, melodic, and "more contemporary." When asked in March 2017 if the album would mark a change in the band's sound, Yoshiki said it would be recognizable, but that the sound needed to evolve. He has described the material as "It's pretty edgy. It's eclectic. Even though people want to say X Japan's heavy-metal or hard rock, the album is very eclectic and a wide range is covered." He previously said in May 2016, "I just didn't want to do the same speed metal and classic vibe on top of it, I just wanted to make it even edgier. So there's more of an electronic music element. We already had that 20 years ago, but I added more, more strings. It's hard to explain. [Laughs] I always have a problem explaining music..." Additionally, Yoshiki stated that some of the songs "may be too experimental" for fans, adding that he consciously ignored comments on social media; "don't get me wrong, their opinions are extremely important, but to create art sometimes you have to be selfish in your own way."

"Scarlet Love Song" was written by Yoshiki to be the theme song of the animated film adaptation of Buddha. After receiving the request, he wrote the song after watching the film and reading the original manga. The version included in the film was released digitally on June 8, 2011, but a different one is expected to be included on the album.

Also released in June 2011, "Jade" was reported as the first single from the album. Yoshiki said he wanted the song to show how X Japan is "evolving," but still retain their "beautiful melodies and aggressiveness." With the song he also wanted to express the pain that he and the band have experienced; saying "you should just accept it and be positive about it."

"Born to Be Free" was released on November 6, 2015 and reported as a single from the album. Yoshiki said its lyrics kind of describe X Japan; Toshi was brainwashed, and when he came back, he was "kind of in a strange world for a while. But when he sings that song, he's like, 'We are free'."

A song called "Kiss the Sky" will be included on the album. Yoshiki called it a "progressive" song like "Art of Life" and the "core song" of the album's story. He explained, "Usually a song goes first verse, second verse, and chorus, that kind of structure", but this 10-minute long track kept evolving. He also announced plans to add the audience from X Japan's Wembley Arena concert to the end of the song.

"La Venus" was written for the 2016 documentary film about X Japan, We Are X. Yoshiki already had the idea for it, but when director Stephen Kijak asked him to write the film's ending theme, he started structuring "La Venus" and finished the lyrics. The version included on the film's soundtrack is an acoustic one, but Yoshiki described the version that will be included on the album as "very heavy."

In 2018, Yoshiki teased a song from the album titled "Rockstar" on social media. In 2022, he called it a "dance style song" that does not feature every X Japan member, instead other artists participated in its recording.

On July 28, 2023, X Japan released "Angel" as their first single in eight years. The song was originally composed by Yoshiki for his solo career, but he then began to think it would fit X Japan's style well and wanted to add an aggressive element to the "beautiful" melody. Lyrically, the drummer said he wanted to write about how people around the world are suffering; "People are hurting, including myself. I wanted to emphasize that you will also be loved. I'm saying, 'Try to love, don't give up. Don't die.' That’s also a message to myself."

== Missed release dates ==
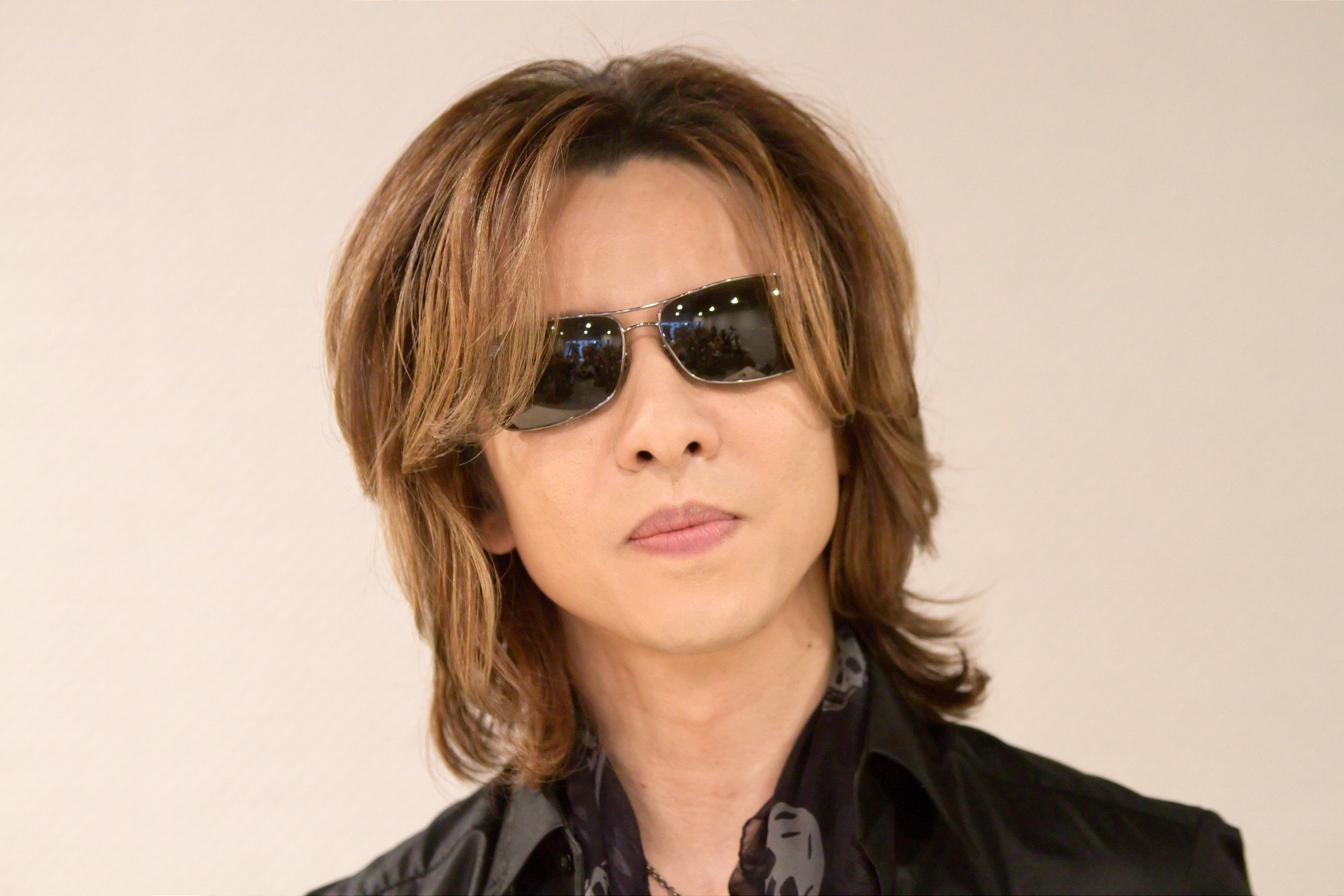
Over the past decade, X Japan and its bandleader Yoshiki (pictured) have announced several release dates for the still unreleased album.

Several release time-frames for the album have been officially announced, reported by media, or otherwise stated by Yoshiki through the years, only for them to be missed. In 2010, it was reported that the new album was expected to be released that year. In January 2011, X Japan announced they had signed a 3-year agreement with EMI in November 2010 to handle the release of the single "Jade" and the new album scheduled for late summer 2011. "Jade" was released in June 2011, but the album was not. In January 2012, Yoshiki said the album was 90% complete and would "be released in 2012 for sure."

In June 2015 the album was announced to be scheduled for release on March 11, 2016, a day before what was dubbed "X Day", which included a concert at Wembley Arena and a screening of the We Are X documentary film about the band. However, the event was postponed until March 4, 2017 due to Pata's health issues, with Yoshiki casually stating on Reddit that they were aiming to release the album on March 3, 2017. In March 2017 interviews, Yoshiki stated that all the songs were "pretty much ready" with just mixing and mastering left to do, and "I think it will come out [this year]." Speaking on the decades-long gap since their last album he said, "From the viewpoint of creating works of art, I don't mind making one album every 30 years. If I push myself too hard, then I can't produce anything. When I release a new work, I always feel so frustrated that I could cry. I just have to let it go and think records are just for recording a certain point in time."

When interviewed by Consequence of Sound in May 2018, Yoshiki said of the album, "Recording's done pretty much, we just have to mix it" and that it would be released in either late summer or early fall 2018. On September 13, 2018, he held a press conference and announced that after 10 years, the album was completed. In 2019, Yoshiki said that he was waiting for the perfect time to release it. The website JRock News reported that reactions from fans to this statement were mixed, with some joking, "It will take another ten years." In October 2020, Yoshiki posted an apology for the repeated delays of the album on social media. Although he said there were various reasons, he acknowledged that it does not reflect well on him as the bandleader. When asked about the album in mid-2022 by Revolver, Yoshiki said he had just remixed something on it that day; "we are not really rushing to release the album right this moment. So I'm just fine tuning a little bit. But if I had to release it next week, it's done." Since then, there has been no news on the album, and it has been approximately 30 years since the last X Japan album was released.

== Track listing ==
Yoshiki uploaded a photograph of a CD with "X Japan Master Album Sequences 2.24.15", the band's logo, and a track list printed on to it to his social media accounts on February 25, 2015 with the caption "#ComingSoon! #XjapanAlbum #WeAreX!". "Jade" is the only song title fully visible on the CD as track 2, with 11 others also printed on it. In March 2017, Yoshiki claimed the album would contain between 13 and 14 tracks, including some short pieces.

"I.V.", "Without You", "Scarlet Love Song", "Jade", "Born to Be Free", "Kiss the Sky", "La Venus", and "Rockstar" have all been announced or reported to be included on the album at various times.
