= Depiction of religious figures =

Depictions of religious figures may refer to:

- Depictions of Jesus
- Depictions of Muhammad
- Depictions of Gautama Buddha in film
- Depiction of God
