= Depictions of Gautama Buddha in film =

Films about the Buddha

The life of Siddhartha Gautama, the Buddha, has been the subject of several films.

== History ==
The first known film about the life of Buddha was Buddhadev (English title: Lord Buddha) which was produced by the well-known Indian filmmaker Dadasaheb Phalke (1870–1944) in 1923.

Two years later, another important Buddha film was released, The Light of Asia (Hindi title: Prem Sanyas). This movie was made by the German filmmaker Franz Osten (1875–1956). Himansu Rai (1892–1940) played the Buddha. Its title suggests that the script was based on the book The Light of Asia composed by the British poet Sir Edwin Arnold, which was issued by the Theosophical Society in 1891. In fact, its contents deviate deliberately from Arnold's book. The film was a greater success in Europe than in India. It gives a somewhat romantic picture of the life of Buddha. Buddhadev as well as The Light of Asia were silent films.

On March 20, 1952, a Japanese feature film representing the life of Buddha had its premiere, Dedication of the Great Buddha. Director Teinosuke Kinugasa (1896–1982) directed the picture under the Japanese film company Daiei Eiga. It was nominated for the 1953 Cannes Film Festival.

Another film about Buddha was a documentary film entitled Gotama the Buddha. It was released by the government of India in 1957 as part of the Buddha's 2500th birthday celebration. Rajbans Khanna acted as director and Bimal Roy as producer. It got an honorable mention at the Cannes film festival in 1957. It is a black-and-white film consisting of beautiful images of natural environments, archeological sites, reliefs and paintings, ancient ones from Ajanta as well as modern ones accompanied by a voice over relating the history of Buddha.

The film Angulimal (1960) was not directly based on the life of Buddha, but on the life of a dacoit and killer who used to loot and kill innocent people and cut off their fingers and who made a garland of such fingers to wear around his neck, thus he got the name Angulimal (Anguli: finger, mala: garland). The film depicts an incident where the dreaded dacoit once met the Buddha when Buddha was passing by a forest and goes ahead to kill him, but was corrected by the compassion of Buddha.

The fifth film about Buddha was a Japanese one, Shaka, produced by Kenji Misumi in 1961. It was shown in the US in 1963 under the title Buddha. On February 13, 1964, a Korean film about the life of the Buddha had its premiere, Seokgamoni, the Korean translation of the Sanskrit Shakyamuni, which in Mahayana Buddhism is the term for the historical Buddha.

In 1997, the Indian producer G.A. Sheshagiri Rao made a Buddha film. It was simply entitled Buddha. This one did not roll in cinemas, but it was only sold on DVD. This one is also the longest movie about Buddha, as it consists of five DVDs with approximately 180 minutes film each.

In 2008, K. Raja Sekhar produced another Buddha film entitled Tathagata Buddha. The original film was in Telugu, but later it was dubbed in Hindi. This film relates Buddha's life story until its end, his parinirvana. The film is available on DVD.

It is known that Buddhists in countries like Sri Lanka and Burma abhor the very idea of any human being impersonating the Buddha in a film. After its release in 1925 The Light of Asia was banned in Sri Lanka and the Malay States (contemporary West Malaysia).

== List of films on the life of Buddha ==
Date	English title	Original title	Country	Notes	IMDB
1923	Lord Buddha	Buddhadev	India	Silent film by Dadasaheb Phalke	
1925	The Light of Asia	Prem Sanyas	Germany/India	Silent film by Franz Osten	
1952	Dedication of the Great Buddha	Daibutsu kaigen (大仏開眼)	Japan	Film by Teinosuke Kinugasa	
1957	Gotoma the Buddha		India	Documentary produced by Bimal Roy. Director was Rajbans Khanna	
1960	Angulimaal		India		
1961	Buddha	Shaka	Japan	Film by Kenji Misumi	
1964	Shakyamuni Buddha	Seokgamoni	South Korea	Film by Il-ho Jang	
1967	Gautama the Buddha		India	Rerelease of Bimal Roy's documentary	
1972	Siddhartha		India/United States	Based on Hermann Hesse's novel of the same name.	
1980	The Story of Buddha	釋迦牟尼 (佛祖降臨)	Hong Kong/Taiwan		
1989	Buddha		India	Short documentary	
1993	Little Buddha		France/Italy/Liechtenstein/United Kingdom	Film by Bernardo Bertolucci, where the life of Buddha is enacted as a story-within-a-story	
1997	Buddha		India	Serial produced by G. Adi Sheshagiri Rao. Director was P.C. Reddy	
2001	Life of Buddha	La Vie de Bouddha	France/India	Documentary produced by Martin Meissonnier	
2004	The Legend of Buddha		India	2D animation film	
2007	The Life of Buddha	Phra Phuttajao	Thailand	2D animation film produced by Wallapa Phimtong	
2008	Tathagatha Buddha: The Life & Times of Gautama Buddha		India	Hindi film on DVD produced by K. Raja Sekhar	
2009	The Rebirth of Buddha	Buddha Saitan (仏陀再誕)	Japan	Happy Science-sponsored film	
2010	The Buddha		US	Produced and directed by David Grubin	
2011	Buddha: The Great Departure	手塚治虫のブッダ－赤い砂漠よ！美しく－	Japan	Anime film based on the manga series Buddha by Osamu Tezuka	
2013	Siddhartha The Buddha	Sri Siddhartha Gautama (ශ්‍රී සිද්ධාර්ථ ගෞතම)	Sri Lanka	Directed by Saman Weeraman	
2013	A Journey of Samyak Buddha	अ जर्नी आफ सम्यक बुद्ध	India	Screenplayed and directed by Praveen Damle, based on Dr. Babasaheb Ambedkar’s book The Buddha and His Dhamma.	
2013	Biography of Buddha	釋迦牟尼佛傳	Hong Kong	directed by Kwok Fai Lee	
2013-2014	Buddha—The King of Kings	बुद्ध - राजाओं का राजा	India	TV series in 55 episodes	
2014	Buddha: The Inner Warrior		India et al.	To be directed by Indian film maker Pan Nalin, official website of the movie	
2014	Buddha 2: The Endless Journey	BUDDHA 2: 手塚治虫のブッダ～終わりなき旅	Japan	Sequel to the film based on the manga series Buddha by Osamu Tezuka	

== See also ==
- Gautama Buddha
- Pali Canon & Early Buddhist Texts
- Dhammacakkappavattana Sutta
- Anattalakkhaṇa Sutta
- Samaññaphala Sutta
- Mahaparinibbana Sutta
- Physical characteristics of the Buddha
- Relics associated with Buddha
- Lumbini, Bodhgaya, Sarnath & Kushinagar
- Great Renunciation & Four sights
- Leela Attitude
- Māravijaya Attitude
- Meditation Attitude
- Naga Prok Attitude
- The Life of Buddha
- The Buddha and His Dhamma
- Angulimala (2003 film)
- Knowing Buddha
