= Scarlet Love Song =

"Scarlet Love Song -Buddha Mix-"

Single by X Japan
- Released: June 8, 2011
- Genre: Symphonic rock
- Length: 6:14
- Label: Japan Music Agency
- Songwriter: Yoshiki
- Producer: Yoshiki

X Japan singles chronology
"I.V." (2008)	"Scarlet Love Song -Buddha Mix-" (2011)	"Jade" (2011)

"Scarlet Love Song" is a song by Japanese heavy metal band X Japan, written by Yoshiki. Created to be the theme song of the 2011 animated film Buddha, the version from the movie was released on June 8, 2011 as the band's first single to feature newest member Sugizo on guitar.

== Overview ==
The song was written by Yoshiki specifically to be the theme song of the animated movie adaptation of the Buddha manga, which was released on May 28, 2011. After receiving the request, he wrote the song after watching the film and reading the original manga.

It was first performed at the Asia Girls Explosion event on March 6, 2011 at Yoyogi National Stadium.

"Scarlet Love Song -Buddha Mix-" was released on June 8, 2011 as a digital download. It reached number 1 on iTunes Japan and number 33 on Billboard's Japan Hot 100. A different version is expected to be included on X Japan's unreleased album.

== Single track listing ==
Written and composed by Yoshiki.

1. "Scarlet Love Song -Buddha Mix-" - 6:14
