= Dedication of the Great Buddha =

1952 film

- Theatrical release poster
- Directed by: Teinosuke Kinugasa
- Written by: Teinosuke Kinugasa; Ryuichiro Yagi
- Starring: Shinobu Araki; Machiko Kyō; Ryōsuke Kagawa
- Cinematography: Kôhei Sugiyama
- Music by: Ikuma Dan
- Production company: Daiei Kyoto
- Release date: 20 March 1952 (Japan)
- Running time: 129 minutes
- Country: Japan
- Language: Japanese

Dedication of the Great Buddha (Japanese: 大仏開眼, Hepburn: Daibutsu kaigen) is a 1952 Japanese film directed by Teinosuke Kinugasa and starring Shinobu Araki, Kōtarō Bandō and Kazuo Hasegawa. It was written by Kinugasaa and Ryuichiro Yagi, and was entered into the 1953 Cannes Film Festival.

== Cast ==
- Shinobu Araki as Ryōben
- Kōtarō Bandō
- Kazuo Hasegawa as Kunihito Tateto
- Sumiko Hidaka as Morime Ōmiya
- Tatsuya Ishiguro
- Ryōsuke Kagawa
- Toshiaki Konoe
- Kanji Koshiba
- Yataro Kurokawa as Nakamaro Fujiwara
- Machiko Kyō as Mayame
- Mitsuko Mito as Sakuyako Tachibana
- Shozo Nanbu
- Shintarō Nanjō
- Joji Oka as Naramaro Tachibana
- Denjirō Ōkōchi as Gyōki
- Sakae Ozawa as Kimimaro Kuninaka
- Mitsusaburō Ramon as Sakamaro
- Taiji Tonoyama
- Kenjiro Uemura as Shōnan Shinjō

== See also ==
- Depictions of Gautama Buddha in film
