= The Life of Buddha =

- Theatrical release poster
- Directed by: Kritsaman Wattananarong
- Written by: Aumpira Wongthamma
- Produced by: Wallapa Phimtong
- Narrated by: Apichart Intorn
- Music by: Kaiwan Kulavadhanothai
- Distributed by: Media Standard Co., Ltd.
- Release date: December 5, 2007 (Thailand)
- Running time: 100 min.
- Country: Thailand
- Language: Thai
- Budget: 120 million baht

The Life of Buddha (Thai: ประวัติพระพุทธเจ้า, RTGS: Prawat Phra Phutthachao, (lit. 'History of Lord Buddha') or simply The Buddha) is a 2007 Thai animated drama film about the life of Gautama Buddha, based on the Tripitaka. The film was released on December 5, 2007, in celebration of Thai King Bhumibol Adulyadej's 80th birthday.

== Production ==
Production of the film started in 2004 as a personal project by Thai businesswoman Wallapa Phimtong, who was beset by financial difficulties and delays. Initially, Wallapa sought backing and expertise through a Thai government agency, but the funding never came through, and Wallapa become embroiled in a lawsuit over the production.

Wallapa continued with the financing of the film on her own, and at first estimated the cost of making the film at 50 million baht, but those costs doubled. She then sold off her cars, land and personal assets to make the film.

Wallapa said a businessman offered to buy the rights to film for 200 million baht but she refused the offer.

"My ultimate goal, after the film has been screened in theatres, is to distribute free copies to schools nationwide. If I sell the project to the firm, that won't be possible," she said in an interview.

=== Critical response ===
Bangkok Post film critic Kong Rithdee said The Buddha was well-meaning, but lacked depth and would appeal mainly to children. "[That] means that The Buddha mirrors the national climate of institutional worship and the indifference, if not the ignorance, to how modern society has twisted Lord Buddha's teachings into something much less pure than their original meanings."

A Pali scholar contributed a critique of the film to Prachatai, in equal parts excoriating and lamenting the film's lack of historical accuracy or even dramatic coherence.

== See also ==
- Depictions of Gautama Buddha in film
- Angulimala (2003 film)
- Buddha's Lost Children
