= A Journey of Samyak Buddha =

- Directed by: Praveen Damle
- Screenplay by: Praveen Damle
- Produced by: Praveen Damle
- Starring: Gita Agrawal; Jyoti Bhagat; Ravi Patil; Gautam Degre; Abhishek Urade; Mrilan Sharma; Abhay Sathe
- Cinematography: Bhushan Prasad
- Edited by: Bhushan Prasad
- Music by: Songs: Praveen Damle; Background Score: Bhushan Prasad; Prashant Umare
- Distributed by: Manoj Nandwana & Jai Viratra Entertainment Limited
- Release date: 2 August 2013
- Country: India
- Language: Hindi
- Budget: ₹80 lakh

A Journey of Samyak Buddha (Hindi: अ जर्नी ऑफ सम्यक बुद्ध) is a 2013 Indian film about the journey of Gautam Buddha’s miraculous birth, marriage, and his path towards enlightenment. The biographical film is based on Babasaheb Ambedkar's book The Buddha and His Dhamma.

== Synopsis ==
Gautam Buddha's biographical movie showcases different facets of his enlightened life.

== Cast ==
The actors in the film included:

- Gita Agrawal
- Jyoti Bhagat
- Ravi Patil
- Gautam Degre
- Abhishek Urade
- Mrilan Sharma
- Abhay Sathe
- Gangadhar Patil
- Jeevan Chore
- Jaya Kamble
- Ashok Sontakke
- Pradeep
- Rashtrapal Wasekar
- Kutramare
- Shankar Machani
- Sunil Dhale
- Harsha Kamble
- Dipankar Salim Sheikh
- Hrithik Roshan
- Sneha Kamble
- Savita Jhamrz

== Artist list ==
- Abhishek Urade as the Buddha
- Ravi Patil as father
- Geeta Agrawal as Prajapati
- Jyoti Bagat as mother
- Mrinal Pendharkar as Yashodhara (gautam's wife.)
- Gautam Dhengare as Bhikshoo Anand

== Production ==
The film was directed and produced by Pravin Damle and it is being distributed by Manoj Nandwana's Jai Viratra Entertainment Limited. The movie is set release to all over India on 26 July 2013. By 2019, the Tibetan dubbed was released with a language of Dzongkha And Tibetan. The film was entirely shot in Wardha.

== See also ==
- Depictions of Gautama Buddha in film
