= X Japan =

Japanese rock band

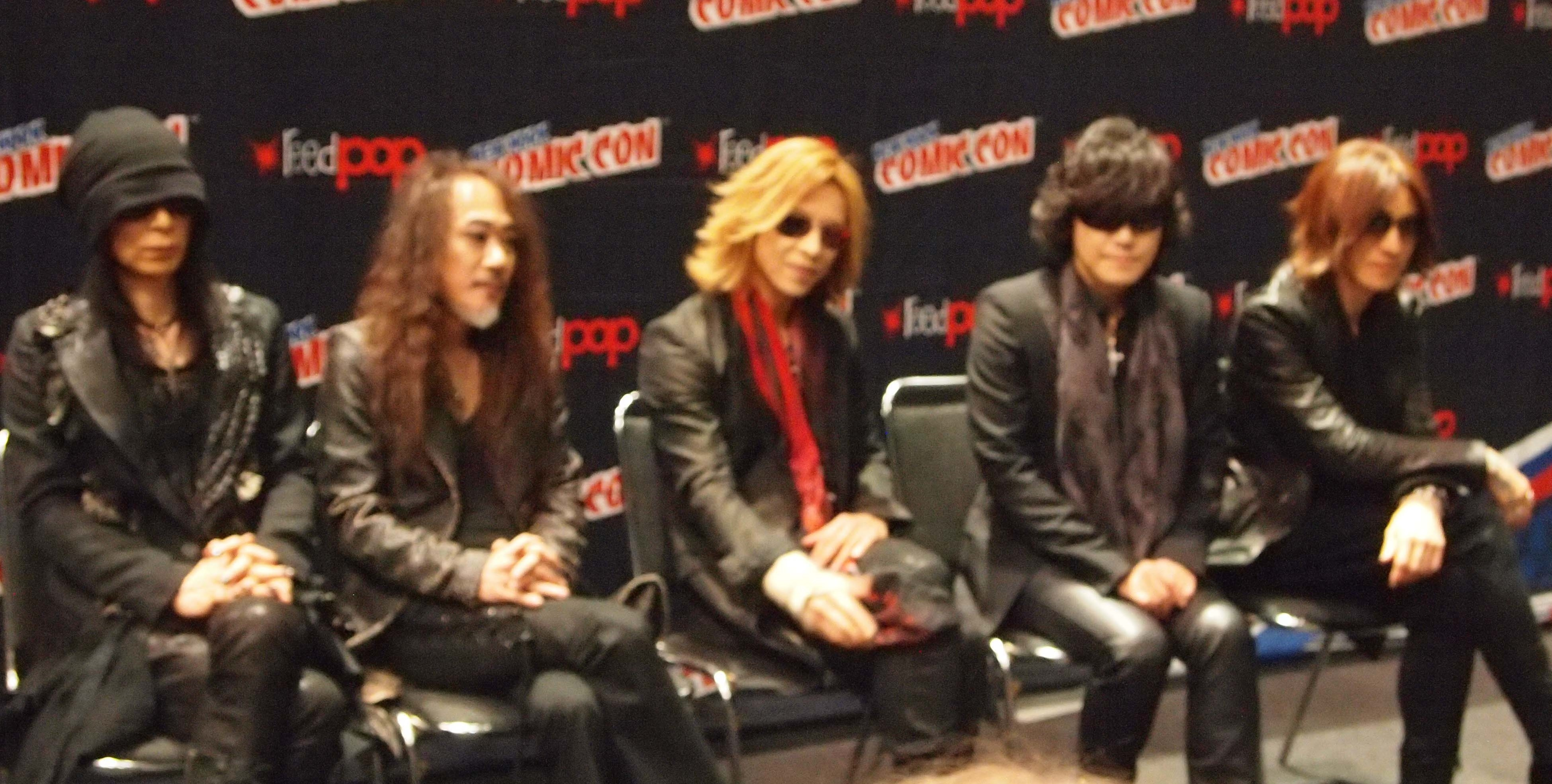
- X Japan at New York Comic Con in 2014. From left to right: Heath, Pata, Yoshiki, Toshi, and Sugizo.

Background information
- Also known as: X (エックス) (1982–1993)
- Origin: Tateyama, Chiba, Japan
- Genres: Rock; heavy metal; symphonic metal; speed metal; power metal; glam metal; progressive metal
- Works: Discography; concert tours and performances
- Years active: 1982–1997; 2007–2018
- Labels: Dada; Extasy; CBS/Sony; Ki/oon; MMG; East West Japan; Atlantic; Polydor; Tofu; EMI; Warner Music Japan; Melodee Music
- Members: Yoshiki; Toshi; Pata; Sugizo
- Past members: Terry; Tomo; Atsushi; Eddie; Hally; Zen/Xenon; Jun/Shu; Hikaru; Kerry; Satoru; Isao; Taiji; Hide; Heath
- Website: xjapan.com

X Japan (Japanese: エックス・ジャパン, Hepburn: Ekkusu Japan) is a Japanese rock band from Chiba, formed in 1982 by drummer and pianist Yoshiki and lead vocalist Toshi. Starting as a predominantly power/speed metal band with heavy symphonic elements, they later gravitated towards a progressive sound with an emphasis on ballads. Besides being one of the first Japanese acts to achieve mainstream success while on an independent label, the group is widely credited as one of the pioneers of visual kei, a movement among Japanese musicians comparable to Western glam.

Originally named X (エックス, Ekkusu), they released their debut album, Vanishing Vision (1988), on Yoshiki's own Extasy Records one year after finalizing their lineup including bassist Taiji, lead guitarist Hide and rhythm guitarist Pata. They achieved breakthrough success in 1989 with the release of their second and major-label debut album, Blue Blood. Following 1991's Jealousy, Taiji left the band in early 1992. He was replaced by Heath and the group changed their name to X Japan before producing the mini-album Art of Life (1993), which is composed solely of the 29-minute title track. In 1995 the group dropped most of its original visual kei aesthetics in favor of a more casual look and released Dahlia (1996), which like their two previous albums debuted at number one. X Japan performed their last concert at the Tokyo Dome on December 31, 1997, making it the last of five consecutive sold-out New Year's Eve concerts the group held at the stadium.

After ten years, X Japan reunited in 2007 and recorded the new song "I.V.". Over the next two years they performed several concerts, including their first overseas show in Hong Kong, and formally added Sugizo as lead guitarist in place of Hide, who died in 1998, before holding a North American tour in 2010. In 2011, the band went on their first world tour throughout Europe, South America and Asia. Shortly after reuniting, work began on their sixth studio album. During its ten years of production, several release dates were announced, but it remains unreleased despite Yoshiki's claim of its completion in September 2018. The band has been inactive since that same year, and Heath died in 2023.

X Japan has released five studio albums, six live albums, and 21 singles. In 2003, HMV Japan ranked the band at number 40 on their list of the 100 most important Japanese pop acts. In 2007, Rolling Stone Japan ranked Blue Blood number 15 on its list of the 100 Greatest Japanese Rock Albums of All Time. In 2017, Loudwire named X Japan the Best Metal Band from Japan. It has been reported that X Japan has sold over 30 million records.

== History ==
=== 1977–1992: X ===
Because of our hardcore outfit and make-up, critics didn't take the music seriously and dismissed us by saying, "They aren't playing music" or "It's some kind of show or costume party." But as the audience grew and shows started selling out everywhere we went, I realized what I had been doing was right.

— Yoshiki about the beginnings of X

In 1977, Yoshiki and Toshi formed a band called Dynamite in their hometown of Tateyama, Chiba, when they were just 11 years old. Dynamite changed its name to Noise in 1978, while they were still in high school. At this time, Toshi played guitar and they had a singer named Kurata. In 1982, Noise disbanded and Yoshiki and Toshi formed a new band, they named it X while they tried to think of another name, but the name stuck. X began to actively perform in the Tokyo area in 1985 with a frequently changing lineup. They originally attempted to pitch in with Japan's underground punk movement, but the band did not fit in with it as they were considered too commercial and flamboyant. Their first single, "I'll Kill You" was released on Dada Records in June and the band contributed "Break the Darkness" to the sampler Heavy Metal Force III in November, which also featured a song by Saver Tiger. In November 1985 bassist Taiji (ex:Dementia) joined X, though he left the group shortly thereafter.

To ensure a continuous outlet for the band's music, Yoshiki founded the independent label Extasy Records in April 1986, and released their second single "Orgasm". Taiji would officially rejoin the band in November of that same year. The songs "Stab Me in the Back" and "No Connexion", for the February 1987 Victor Records sampler Skull Thrash Zone Volume I, were recorded with Pata (ex:Judy) as a support guitar player. Soon after these recordings Hide (ex:Saver Tiger) joined as a guitarist. After Pata once again provided support, this time at a live show, he officially joined, completing the group's first well-known lineup.

X circa 1990: Toshi, Taiji, Yoshiki, Pata, Hide

In August 1987, they performed at the Rock Monster event at Kyoto Sports Valley and gave out their first home video, Xclamation. On December 26, 1987, the band participated in an audition held by CBS/Sony which led to a recording contract in August of the following year. In the meantime the band released its first album, Vanishing Vision through Extasy Records on April 14, 1988, and toured extensively in support of the record. The album's first press of 10,000 copies sold out in a week, topping the Oricon indies chart and reaching number 19 on the main Oricon Albums Chart, making them the first independent band to appear on the main chart. The Vanishing Tour Vol.2 took the band to 20 locations for 24 shows from June to July, while the Burn Out Tour had 12 performances throughout October. In November, X participated in music magazine Rockin'f's Street Fighting Men concert at Differ Ariake Arena. That year the members also made a brief cameo appearance in the American film Tokyo Pop, starring Carrie Hamilton and Diamond Yukai.

X's sold out Blue Blood Tour started on March 13, with two of the concerts selling out in advance, including the March 16 show at Shibuya Public Hall, which was later released on home video as Blue Blood Tour Bakuhatsu Sunzen Gig. The album Blue Blood was released on April 21, 1989, and debuted at number six on the Oricon chart. The single "Kurenai" reached number five and the band went on the Rose & Blood Tour, which was temporarily suspended when Yoshiki collapsed after a November 22 concert. This success earned the band the "Grand Prix New Artist of the Year" award at the 4th annual Japan Gold Disc Awards in 1990. On November 24, 1990, X flew to Los Angeles to begin recording their follow-up album, Jealousy. When members arrived back in Japan in June, 500 members of the Japan Self-Defence Forces were at the airport to control the crowd. The album was released on July 1, 1991, and debuted at number one, selling over 600,000 copies. It was later certified million by the RIAJ. In August the band performed their first concert at Japan's largest indoor concert venue, the Tokyo Dome. Footage from most of the band's shows in that stadium would later be released on CD and home video. The show was part of the Violence in Jealousy Tour, which lasted to the end of the year and once again saw Yoshiki collapse after the October 24 Yokohama Arena gig. December 8 saw the X with Orchestra concert at NHK Hall, where, as the name suggests, the band performed backed by an orchestra.

1992 began with three sold-out concerts at the Tokyo Dome, titled Tokyo Dome 3 Days: On the Verge of Destruction, on January 5–7. On January 31, it was announced that bass player Taiji had left the group. The official reason given for his departure was musical differences. However, in his autobiography, Taiji claims he was asked to leave because he confronted Yoshiki about the substantial income gap between Yoshiki and each of the other members. When asked about Taiji's departure in 2016, Yoshiki said, "he crossed the line of our band's rules" and "To this day I still don't know if the decision was right or wrong, but we didn't have a choice." On August 24, 1992, the band held a press conference in New York at Rockefeller Center. There, Heath (ex-Media Youth) was announced as their new bass player. Around this time, the band's success in Japan made an international breakthrough appear likely, leading to them leaving Sony for an American record contract with Atlantic Records and the renaming of the band from X to X Japan, in order to distinguish them from the American punk group X. (An American album release would never happen.) Their first show with Heath was at the October 1992 Extasy Summit at Osaka-jō Hall.

=== 1993–1997: X Japan ===
The X Japan logo, used by the band after the name change in 1992

Art of Life was released on August 25, 1993, by Atlantic Records, and consists solely of the 29-minute, heavily orchestrated title track. It debuted at number one; however, the band performed only two concerts that year, as each member began solo careers. Titled X Japan Returns, the concerts were held at the Tokyo Dome on December 30 and 31, marking the beginning of a New Year's Eve tradition that would last until the group's disbandment. The solo careers continued into the following year, with X Japan only performing four shows. The first two were the last two days of The Great Music Experience, and the others were December 30–31 at the Tokyo Dome, titled Aoi Yoru (青い夜; Blue Night) and Shiroi Yoru (白い夜; White Night) respectively.

1995 was also quiet, until November 19 when the band began the tour for their next album, Dahlia Tour 1995–1996. Around this time, the group dropped most of its original visual kei aesthetics in favor of a more casual look. While it was not released until November 4, 1996, singles from the album had been released as early as a few months after Art of Life. Though this caused Dahlia to contain relatively little new material, the album reached number one on the charts. The tour was originally scheduled to end on March 31, 1996; however, it was cut short when Yoshiki herniated cervical vertebrae after the March 13 show. They did, however, perform their tradition of two Tokyo Dome concerts on December 30–31, titled Resurrection Night (復活の夜, Fukkatsu no Yoru) and Reckless Night (無謀な夜, Mubōna Yoru).

On September 22, 1997, Yoshiki, Hide, Pata and Heath held a press conference where they announced that X Japan would disband. Vocalist Toshi decided to leave the band, claiming that the glamorous, success-oriented life of a rock star failed to satisfy him emotionally, as opposed to a simpler life and career. He stated that he had made the decision back in April 1996, though it was not publicly disclosed. However, around twelve years later, he confirmed what was long reported in the media: that he was "brainwashed" via violence and abuse and conned out of money, leading to bankruptcy. X Japan performed their farewell show, titled The Last Live: Saigo no Yoru, at the Tokyo Dome on December 31, 1997, making it the last of five consecutive New Year's Eves the group performed at the stadium. However, later that day they played "Forever Love" at that year's Kōhaku Uta Gassen, marking their true last performance.

=== 1998–2007: Post-X Japan ===
While reissues, compilations and live footage continued to be released, the members of X Japan pursued solo careers and other projects. Hide, who released his first solo album Hide Your Face in 1994, continued his solo career with a sound distinctively different from X Japan's music, leaning more towards alternative rock, until his death on May 2, 1998. Just two months later, the debut album 3.2.1. from his American-based band Zilch, which included Ray McVeigh (The Professionals), Paul Raven (Killing Joke) and Joey Castillo (Queens of the Stone Age), was released. His third solo album Ja, Zoo, formally including his live band Spread Beaver, was released in November 1998 and became his most successful, having reached number one and sold over a million copies. Prior to his death, Hide and Yoshiki talked about restarting X Japan with a new vocalist in the year 2000.

Toshi's solo career, which began in 1992, has been extensive, with him having released over 30 albums and performed numerous acoustic shows for smaller audiences. According to his website, his Utatabi Traveling Concert tour included over 3,000 concerts between 1999 and 2003. After both having released solo albums in the early 1990s, Pata and Heath teamed up with Spread Beaver percussionist/programmer I.N.A., who worked on several of X Japan's releases, to provide a track for the 1998 Hide tribute album Tribute Spirits. The three would reunite again in 2000 to form Dope HEADz, which released two albums before ceasing activity. Heath then continued his solo career and Pata formed the instrumental rock group Ra:IN, which later added Spread Beaver keyboardist DIE.

Before the band's breakup, Yoshiki had already independently collaborated with Queen drummer Roger Taylor on the single "Foreign Sand" and provided the Japanese contribution to the international Kiss tribute album Kiss My Ass: Classic Kiss Regrooved, an orchestral arrangement of the song "Black Diamond". A compilation with orchestral treatments of X Japan songs, titled Eternal Melody was also released. It was performed by the London Philharmonic Orchestra and among others featured The Beatles producer George Martin as an arranger.

Since 1998 Yoshiki has engaged in numerous activities, such as briefly being a member of the pop band Globe, producing singles for the Korean rock band TRAX and numerous others, as well as working on his solo project Violet UK, which has yet to publish a major release. He has also contributed music to the movie Catacombs and produced the soundtrack of Repo! The Genetic Opera. On May 25, 2007, the formation of the supergroup S.K.I.N. was announced, which besides Yoshiki consists of pop/rock artists Gackt and Miyavi, as well as Luna Sea guitarist Sugizo. The band gave its only performance at the Anime Expo convention in Long Beach, California, on June 29, 2007.

=== 2007–2008: Reunion ===
According to a report by the newspaper Sponichi, Toshi visited Yoshiki in Los Angeles in November 2006 to work on the song "Without You" as a tribute to Hide. On March 21, 2007, Toshi announced on his website that he and Yoshiki had recently resumed working together, stating that a "new project" would commence soon. Rumors of an X Japan reunion subsequently began, and in June Yoshiki was reported as having expressed interest in a tour (beginning in Los Angeles), "Without You" being released as a single, and that he was in talks with Heath and Pata regarding their participation.

The band made its first public appearance on October 22, 2007, on the rooftop of the shopping center Aqua City in Odaiba, Tokyo, to film a music video for the newly recorded song "I.V.". The song was used as the theme of the American horror movie Saw IV. It was written by Yoshiki and recorded with all X Japan members of the pre-breakup lineup, as it utilizes previously unreleased guitar tracks by Hide. "I.V." was released through iTunes on January 23, 2008, topping the store's charts on that day.

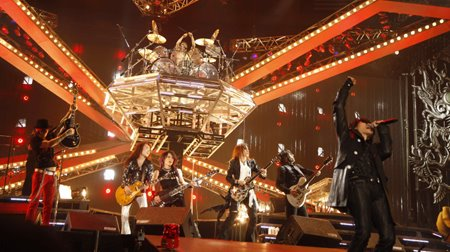
X Japan with guests Richard Fortus, Sugizo, and Wes Borland in 2008.

On January 20, 2008, two Tokyo Dome concert dates were announced for March 28 and March 30. Due to popular demand, they added another concert for the 29th. These three shows were entitled X Japan Resume Attack 2008 I.V. – Towards Destruction, with each individual concert titled Night of Destruction, Night of Madness and Night of Creation, respectively, and featured three guest guitarists filling in for the late Hide – Wes Borland, Richard Fortus and Sugizo. The March 28 concert was aired live on the pay-per-view channel WOWOW. During the song "Art of Life" a hologram of Hide (taken from footage of the "Art of Life" performance at the Tokyo Dome in 1993) played alongside the band. Because of technical difficulties, possibly due to the hologram, the first concert was delayed for over two hours and later came to an abrupt end when drummer Yoshiki collapsed eight songs into the performance. The subsequent shows were without such difficulties, and during a press conference, plans for a concert in Paris on July 5, 2008, were announced, with an intended audience of 20,000 people. In addition to the Paris date, plans for concerts at the Madison Square Garden in New York City on September 13, and at the Taipei World Trade Center in Taipei on August 2 were also announced.

=== 2008–2010: Delays, Sugizo joins and first overseas performances ===
The Hide memorial summit took place on May 3 and 4, 2008, at Ajinomoto Stadium, with X Japan performing the second day, as a tribute to the musician who was also a former X guitarist. Numerous other popular acts such as T.M.Revolution, Oblivion Dust and Versailles also performed, with Phantasmagoria and Luna Sea even reuniting for one day. Organizers planned for an estimated 100,000 fans to attend the two shows. On June 8, it was reported that all of X Japan's previously scheduled shows would be postponed until further notice, due to a recurrence of Yoshiki's disc herniation. The Paris and Taipei concerts were rescheduled, Paris for November 22, 2009.

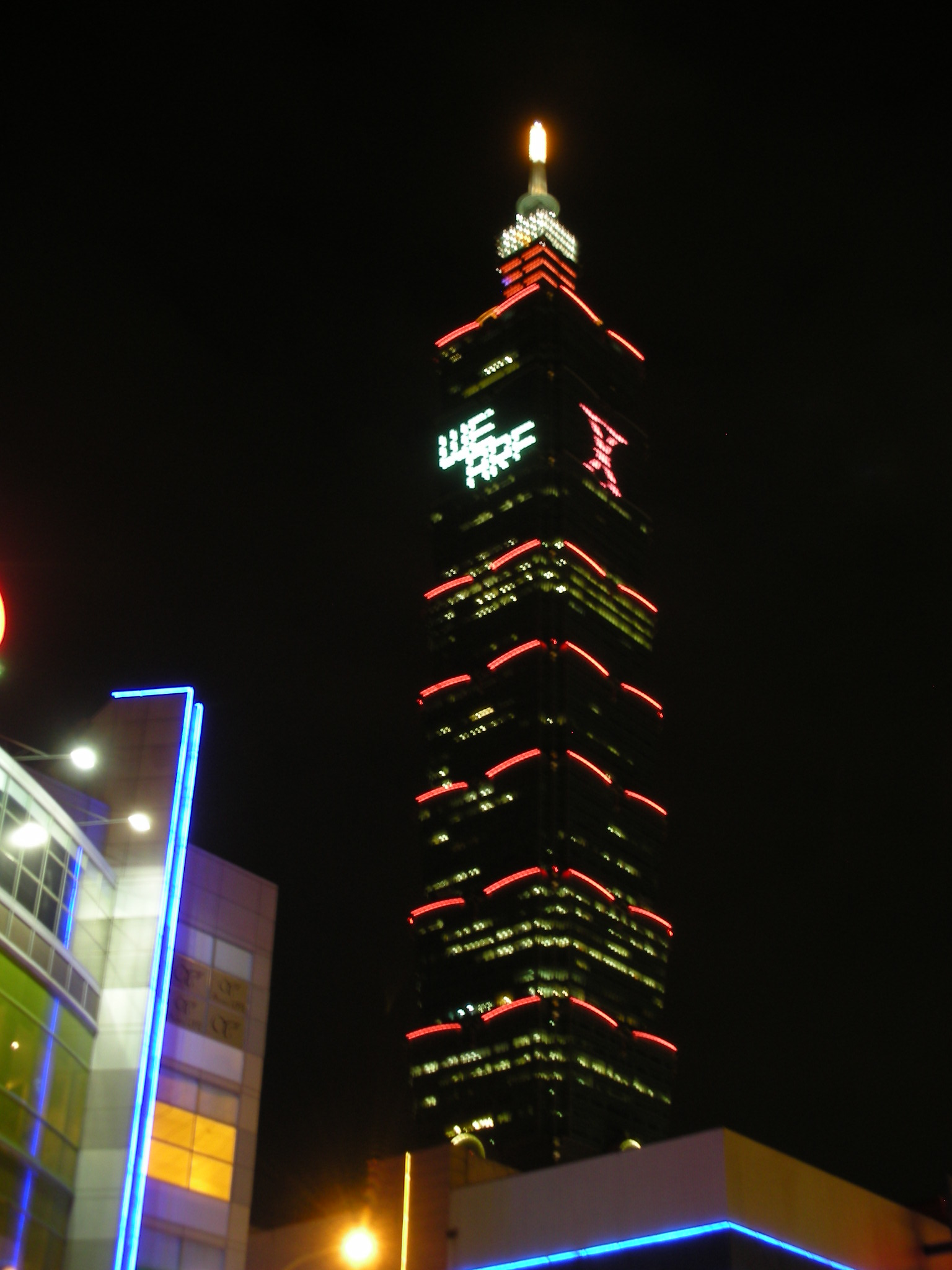
A special illumination in Taipei, in celebration of the first X Japan live concert in Taiwan in 2009

On September 15, 2008, Yoshiki held a press conference in Tokyo, where he announced a new, unnamed X Japan song was in the works. Concerts at Saitama Super Arena on Christmas and New Year's Eve 2008 were also announced. After the conference Yoshiki went on a promotional tour across Asia. On November 7, the French ticketing website Avos announced that the planned ticket sale for the show in Paris would be canceled. Later that day, X Japan released a press statement through their French language website apologizing for the second postponement and announced that the planned Christmas shows would likely suffer a similar fate. On December 31, X Japan performed their New Year's Eve countdown performance at the Akasaka Blitz.

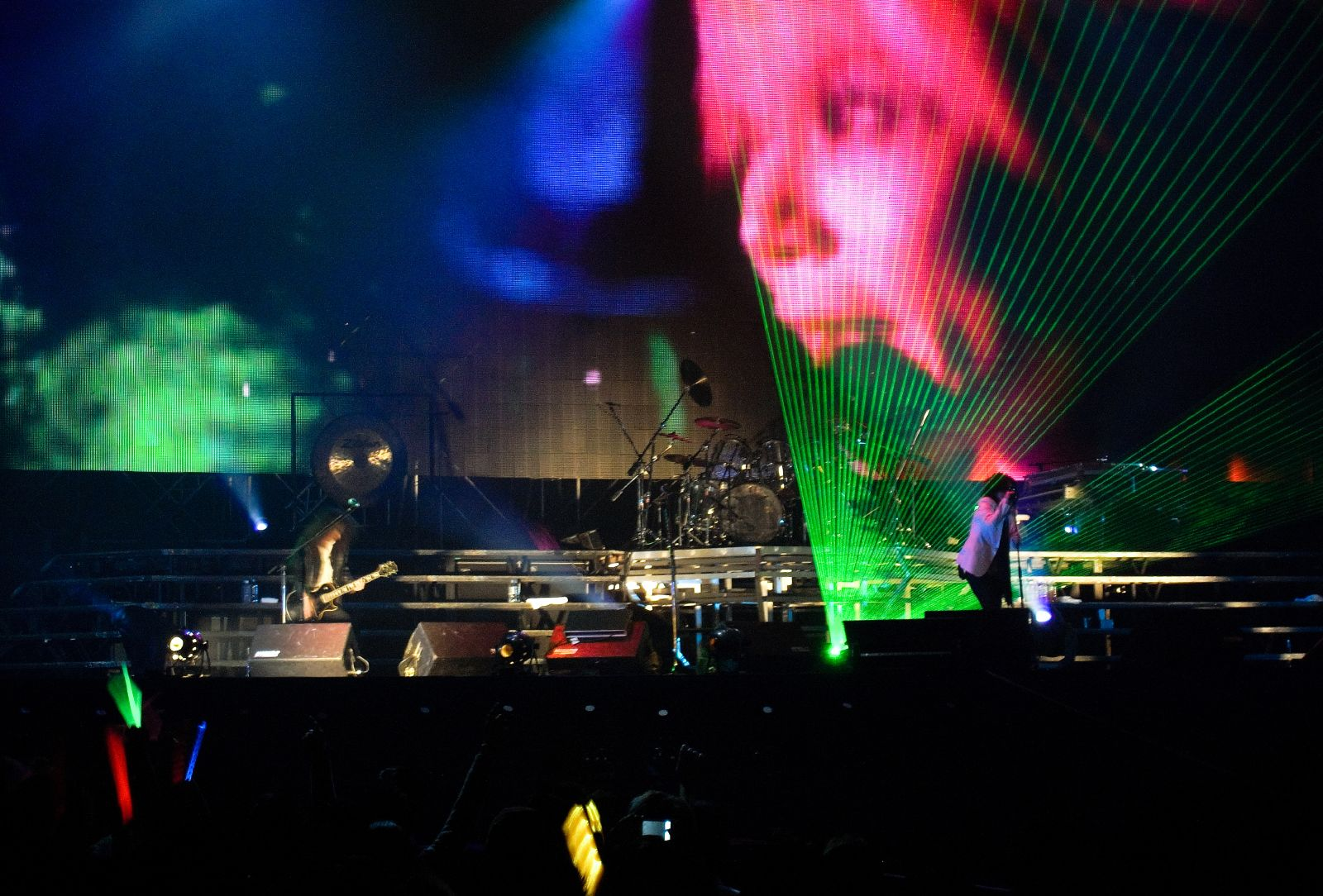
X Japan in concert in Hong Kong 2009, featuring a projected image of the deceased Hide, whom they still consider a member of the band

On January 15, 2009, the band arrived in Hong Kong for their January 16 and 17 shows. On May 1, it was announced that Sugizo officially joined X Japan as lead guitarist. Since the band still considers the deceased Hide a member, Sugizo became the sixth member of X Japan. Their first show with him as a full member was held the next day at the Tokyo Dome, where they played "Jade" for the first time. The Taiwan concert that was postponed for a second time in January, was finally held on May 30, 2009.

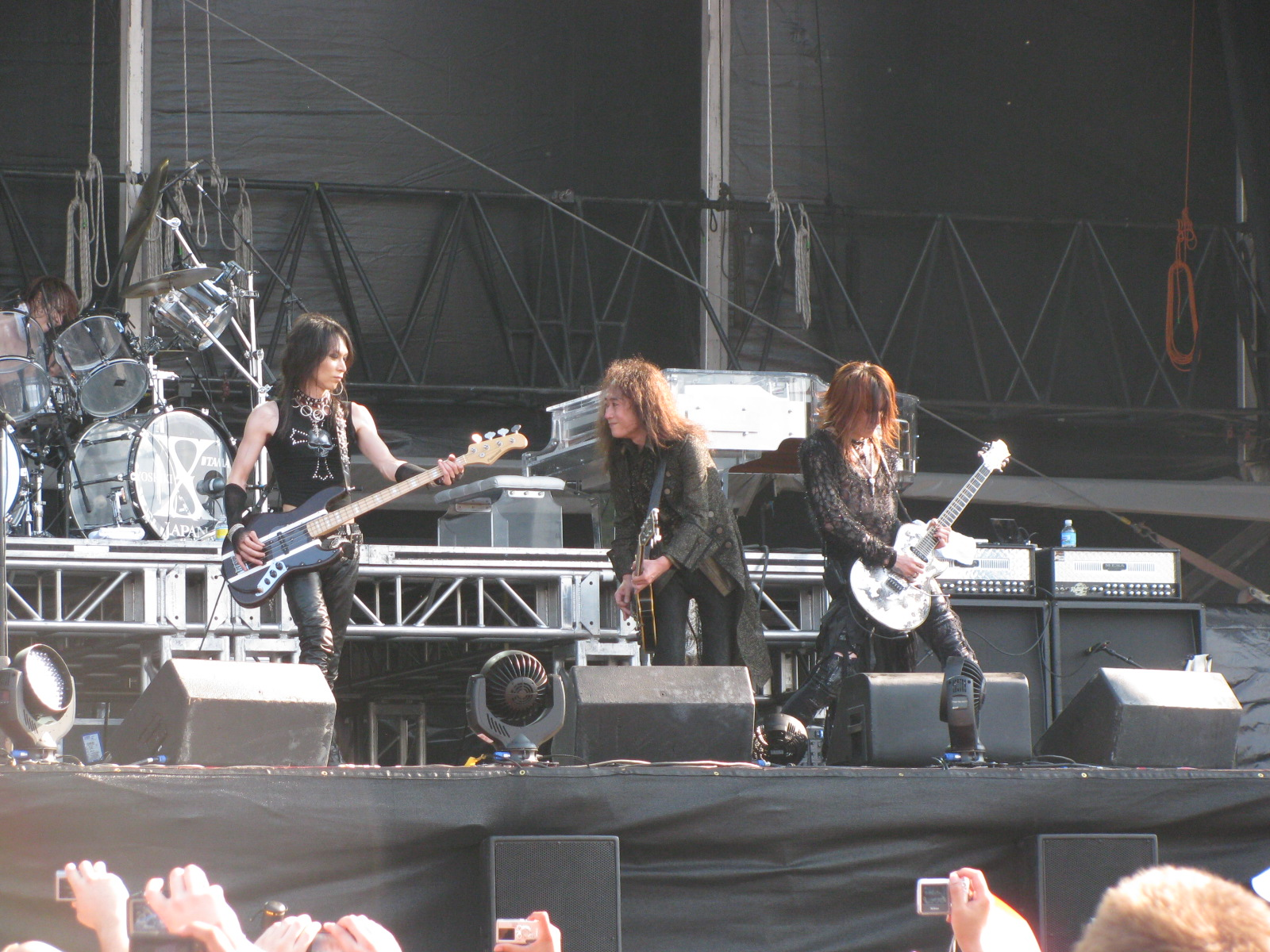
X Japan at Lollapalooza in 2010

On January 9, 2010, the band made its first public U.S. appearance by shooting four new music videos in Hollywood. The four videos were for "Rusty Nail", "Endless Rain", "I.V.", and their new song "Jade". In February, Yoshiki confirmed that X Japan would be performing at Lollapalooza in August. Later that month, he announced at a press event that the band would be relocating to Los Angeles, California, with a concert being planned for a "simple" venue in the city area to mark the band's first official North American show. It was also announced that a sixth album was in the works and was expected to be released in the fall.

In March 2010, Yoshiki filed a lawsuit against Nexstar Corporation, for 375 million yen in damages. The band's contract with the company included the use of recordings, the initial deal was for 600 million yen in advance royalties and contract money, which the band claims not to have received. Between 2008 and 2009, the company also sponsored several concerts around Asia and Japan, not having paid performance fees and merchandise sales to X Japan. In all, the total unpaid amount was more than 900 million yen. The lawsuit sought only 375 million yen for the revenue earned from the concerts, with an additional claim of 600 million yen in case the trial proceeded. Yoshiki's side eventually won the lawsuit in 2014, where the Tokyo District Court ordered Nexstar to pay 660 million yen in damages.

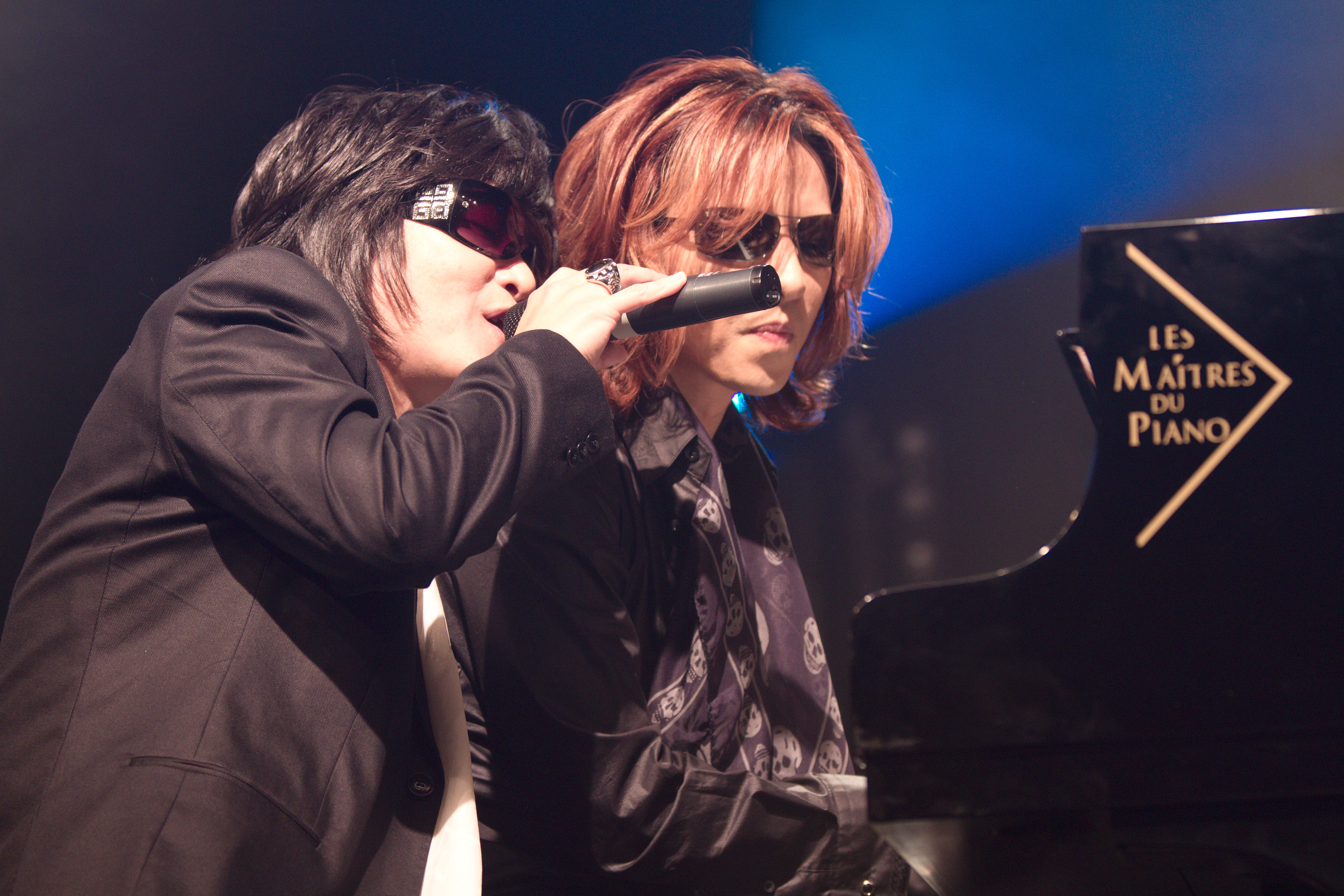
Toshi and Yoshiki at Japan Expo 2010

On July 1, the band appeared at Club Nokia in Los Angeles where they performed an acoustic setlist, and recorded a music video for the new song, "Born to Be Free". On July 4, the two founding members Toshi and Yoshiki, appeared in Paris at the Japan Expo 2010 where they performed some songs. During the following month, X Japan and Yoshiki were featured in numerous newspapers and websites such as ABC News, the Los Angeles Times and the Chicago Sun-Times. X Japan performed at Lollapalooza 2010 in Grant Park in Chicago on August 8. In the following days, Yoshiki did a Q&A article with the Phoenix New Times and was interviewed by ABC News.

On August 14 and 15, 2010, the band performed a two-day show at Nissan Stadium, the largest stadium in Japan. Some media reported an estimated attendance of 140,000 for the two concerts. Ex-bassist Taiji joined them on stage both nights as a guest for the song "X"; he would die the following year. Soon after, formerly deceased guitarist Hide's management company, Headwax Organization, filed a lawsuit against Yoshiki and X Japan's management, Japan Music Agency, for using images of the former member without a formal agreement in place. The claim states that in 2000 the two companies signed an agreement allowing Yoshiki and X Japan to use visual images of Hide during concerts. However, images were used at these Nissan Stadium shows, when apparently the contract already expired.

From September 25 to October 10, X Japan performed their first ever North American tour with dates in Los Angeles, Oakland, Seattle, Chicago, Vancouver, Toronto and New York City. On December 17, Yoshiki announced that a new X Japan song, "Scarlet Love Song", was composed for the animated movie adaptation of the Buddha manga.

=== 2011–2014: World tour and Madison Square Garden ===
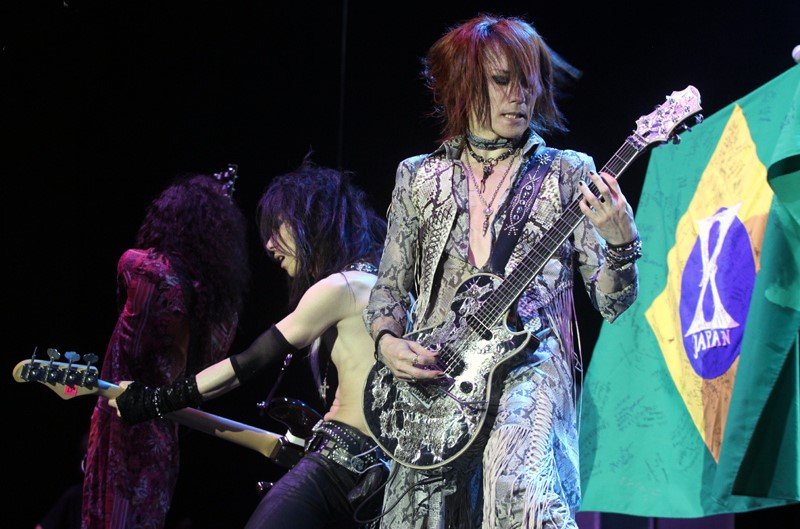
Pata, Heath and Sugizo performing in São Paulo, 2011

It was announced on January 27, 2011, that X Japan signed a 3-year agreement with EMI in November 2010. The label will handle the American distribution of their single "Jade", which was to be released on March 15, and their untitled album, which was set for release in late summer. In promotion of the new album, it was also stated they would be touring extensively around the world throughout 2011. X Japan performed on March 6 at Asia Girls Explosion, a fashion event and music concert that Yoshiki created with Jay FR. It was announced they would perform in Argentina, Brazil, Chile, Mexico, and Peru later in the year.

Due to the 2011 Tōhoku earthquake and tsunami that occurred in Japan on March 11, the band decided to postpone the release of "Jade" until June 28. Yoshiki also decided to auction off one of his used signature Kawai crystal grand pianos, of which all proceeds were sent to help provide aid to the victims of the earthquake and tsunami through Yoshiki Foundation America.

"Scarlet Love Song" was released in Japan on June 8, and on June 28 their first worldwide single, "Jade", was released, both on iTunes. That same day they performed in London, the first concert of the European leg of their ongoing world tour, which was followed by Paris on July 1, Utrecht on July 2 and Berlin on July 4.

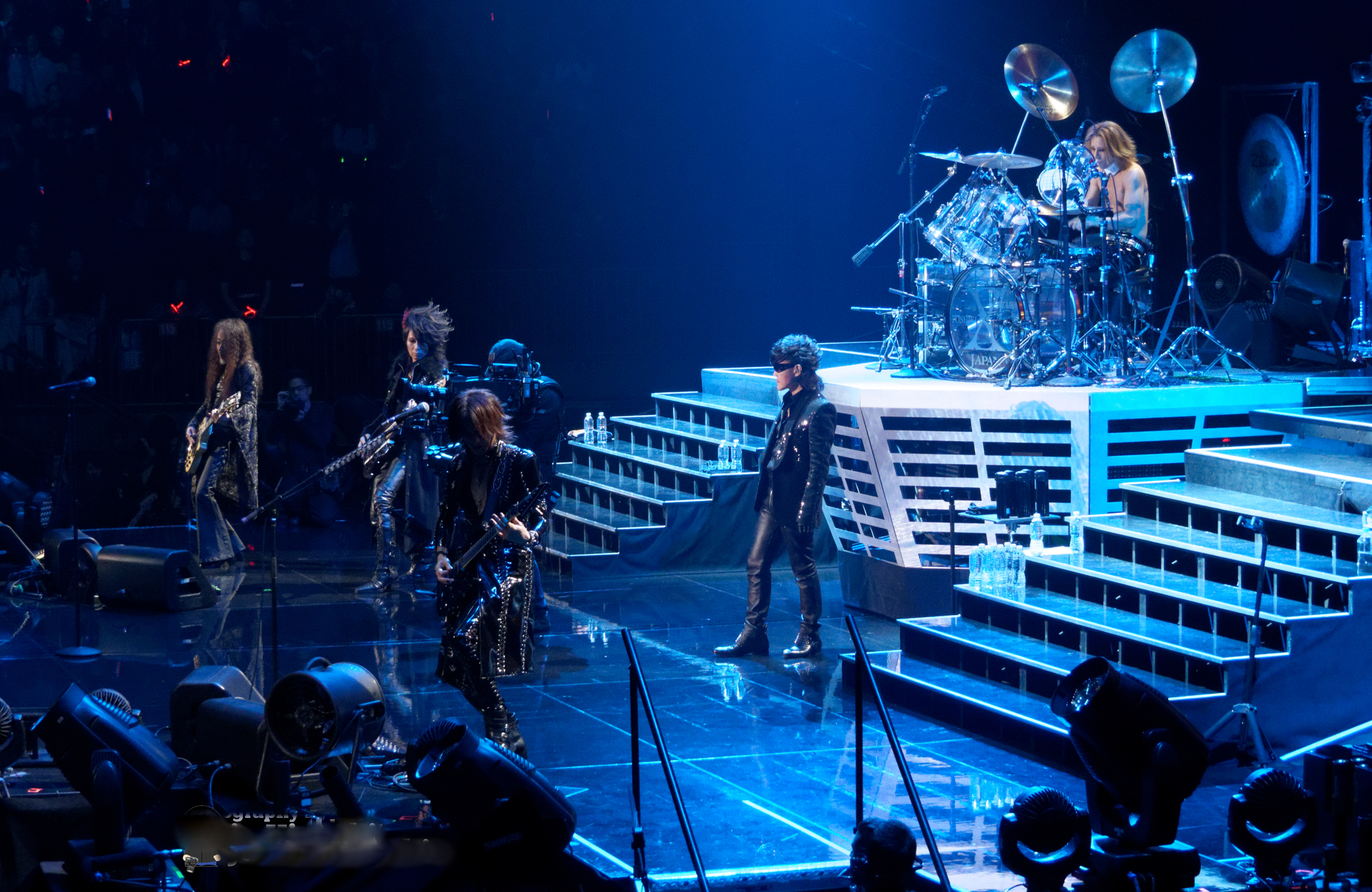
X Japan at Madison Square Garden in 2014

X Japan also performed at the 2011 Summer Sonic festival that was held on August 13 and 14, in Tokyo and Osaka. Their world tour's South American leg took them to; Santiago on September 9, São Paulo on September 11, Buenos Aires on September 14, Lima on September 16 and Mexico City on September 18. The Asian leg of the tour brought stops in Seoul on October 28, Shanghai on October 30, Hong Kong on November 4, Taipei on November 6 and Bangkok on November 8. The Beijing show, originally scheduled for November 2, was cancelled by the promoters on October 25 due to "technical and production issues".

After more than two years of inactivity, X Japan announced the remastered compilation album The World ~X Japan Hatsu no Zensekai Best~ for release on June 17, 2014. Prior to its physical release, a digital version titled X Japan World Best became available in 111 countries via iTunes on May 21. They performed at Yokohama Arena on September 30 and October 1, and at Madison Square Garden on October 11. At both concerts, the cover of the song "Beneath The Skin" was played, originally written by Sugizo for S.K.I.N., the group formed by Yoshiki in 2007. They participated in Music Station Super Live 2014 on New Year's Eve, marking their first television appearance in seventeen years, the last being on Kōhaku Uta Gassen in 1997.

=== 2015–present: Unreleased sixth studio album, We Are X, and Heath's death ===
In June 2015, Yoshiki announced X Japan's sixth and first studio album in 20 years would be released on March 11, 2016. The band has announced that the sixth album would contain between 13 and 14 tracks, including some short pieces. It was also announced that they would perform at the Wembley Arena in London on the following day, where We Are X, a documentary film about the band, would be premiered. The band performed on June 28 at Makuhari Messe as part of the second night of Luna Sea's Lunatic Fest. The first single from the album, "Born to Be Free", was released on November 6, 2015. X Japan's first domestic tour of Japan in 20 years began with three consecutive dates at Yokohama Arena on December 2, continued with Osaka-jō Hall on December 7, Marine Messe Fukuoka on December 9, Hiroshima Green Arena on December 11, and finished on December 14 at the Nippon Gaishi Hall. They also performed on Kōhaku Uta Gassen for the first time in 18 years.

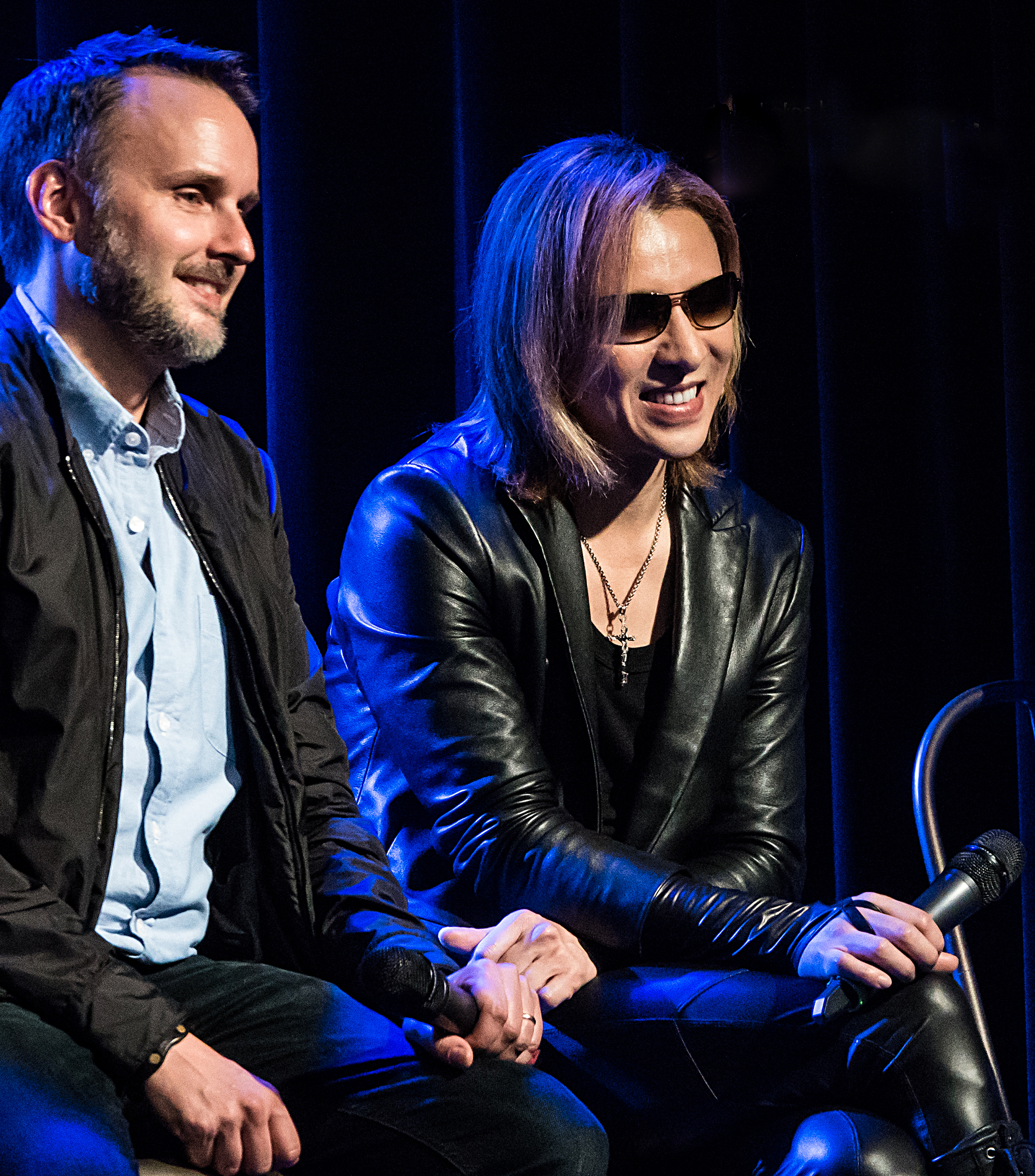
Yoshiki (right) with director Stephen Kijak at a Q&A session of the San Francisco screening of We Are X in October 2016

On January 15, 2016, Pata was rushed to the intensive care unit of a Tokyo hospital. He was diagnosed with a life-threatening condition, which included a severe blood clot, but was in stable condition. On February 3, X Japan announced the postponement of their album release and March 12 concert at the Wembley Arena for a whole year; the concert subsequently took place on March 4, 2017. In June, Yoshiki stated that Pata was discharged from the hospital in March, but had to go back for surgery in August. Pata announced he was discharged on August 10. X Japan headlined all three nights of the Visual Japan Summit on October 14–16, 2016, at Makuhari Messe. The We Are X soundtrack album was released on March 3, 2017. The soundtrack reached No. 4 in its first week in the Oricon Albums Chart, No. 27 in the UK Albums Chart, and No. 1 in the UK Rock & Metal Albums Chart. On March 3, 2017, an album signing took place at HMV in Oxford Street, London. All the physical copies of the We Are X soundtrack available at the signing were sold in the event. According to store staff, this was the first time there was a sell-out of all physical copies at such a signing. A new song, "La Venus" was used as the ending theme song for We Are X and was one of 91 songs in contention for nomination for the Academy Award for Best Original Song for the 89th Academy Awards. In April 2017, Yoshiki announced that the sixth album's songs were ready and only mixing and mastering remained, and the release was expected "in the next few months". When Yoshiki performed on BBC Radio 4's Front Row on October 20, 2017, it was announced the sixth album would be released in Spring 2018.

On May 9, 2017, Yoshiki's management announced that the drummer would undergo urgent surgery on May 16, where an artificial disc would be inserted between his vertebrae. Due to his health conditions, it was reported that concerts would need to be either rescheduled or cancelled. On June 9, X Japan announced at a press conference that the concerts would not be postponed but instead performed as an acoustic tour, with Yoshiki at the piano, as it is uncertain whether he would be able to play the drums in the future. In November it was announced that X Japan will perform at the year-end Kōhaku Uta Gassen, as part of the White Team. The band performed a medley of "Endless Rain" and "Kurenai", and during the performance Yoshiki played drums again for the first time since his neck surgery.

The January 2018 issue of Neo magazine named X Japan the "Best Musical Act" in their annual awards, with We Are X named the "Best Asian Movie". In February 2018, the band's performance at Wembley in 2017 was named the "Best Event" at Wembley Arena in the 2017 SSE Live Awards. In March 2018, We Are X was named the "Best Music Film" in the Space Shower Music Awards. On April 10 and 11 the band performed at Zepp Divercity in Tokyo for a limited audience, and the concert was broadcast live across Asia in selected theaters. Richard Fortus, Wes Borland, and Miya appeared as guest musicians. Fortus and Borland also joined X Japan on stage for their first performance at the Coachella festival on April 14 and 21. At the second weekend of the festival, Marilyn Manson joined the band on stage and performed "Sweet Dreams" with Yoshiki on piano. When interviewed for KLOS's Jonesy's Jukebox, Yoshiki said the album would be released in either summer or fall 2018.

In July, it was also announced that X Japan would perform at the TV Asahi Dream Festival on September 15, 2018. On Christmas Day 2018, X Japan were named 43rd in that year's Oricon Favorite Artists poll. In an interview with JRock News on February 13, 2019, Yoshiki said, "X Japan's album is actually completed. It took over 10 years to record, I'm looking for the perfect timing to release it."

X Japan released the single "Angel" on July 28, 2023. It was the first new song released by the band in eight years. That same month, following Elon Musk's move to rebrand Twitter as "X", it was reported that the Japanese branch of the company, then named "Twitter Japan", would be rebranded as "X Japan". This led to Yoshiki commenting on Twitter that: "I think it's already trademarked." As a result of the band having the trademark for "X Japan", it was reported that "Twitter Japan" would instead be rebranded "X Nippon". Yoshiki said in an interview with Consequence that he respected Musk and felt fans should decide the name of the platform.

On November 7, 2023, news outlets reported that longtime bassist Heath had died in late October shortly after being diagnosed with cancer. On November 11, an official statement posted on the musician's website disclosed that Heath was diagnosed with colon cancer in June and died in a hospital on October 29, 2023, after his condition suddenly worsened that month. It was also announced that X Japan leader Yoshiki has been entrusted with organizing a memorial concert per Heath's wishes.

== Musical style ==
"Kurenai"
"Kurenai", X's major-label debut single, is a fast power metal song with heavy symphonic elements and has become one of the band's signature songs.

"Tears"
A piano-driven ballad with classical orchestration, "Tears" was the band's first single released with bassist Heath.

"Scars"
X's only single written by someone other than Yoshiki, "Scars" is a progressive metal song by the band's deceased former guitarist hide.

X Japan's music developed in the wake of American and British glam and heavy metal music, and was characterized by driving speed/power metal compositions with symphonic elements (e.g. "Kurenai", "Silent Jealousy") and emotional ballads (e.g. "Endless Rain", "Forever Love"). Many of the group's songs make use of orchestrated passages, particularly on longer tracks such as the ten-and-a-half-minute "Tears", "Crucify My Love", and the twenty-nine-minute "Art of Life".

The majority of the band's lyrics are in Japanese, the band's native language; however, many lyrics alternate from Japanese to English and back. Examples of this include the spoken background vocals during the bridge of "Rusty Nail", and multiple lines (including the entire pre-chorus) of the song "Week End". The first recorded version of "Kurenai" from Vanishing Vision contains lyrics entirely in English.

The majority of the band's catalog of music was written by Yoshiki with relatively little composition from the other members. Hide contributed several songs, including the single "Scars", while Pata's only writing credit is "White Wind from Mr. Martin ~Pata's Nap~". Toshi's contributions are limited to lyrics for a few songs. Taiji contributed music to a couple of songs, notably "Voiceless Screaming" from the album Jealousy, for which, when performed live, he played the acoustic guitar, and "Desperate Angel". Heath's only writing credit is the instrumental song "Wriggle" on the 1996 album Dahlia, which he wrote with Pata. Only one song is credited as a full band collaboration, "Easy Fight Rambling" on the 1989 album Blue Blood. Of songs from the band's lesser-known former members, only the track "Time Trip Loving" from the single "Orgasm", composed by Jun with Toshi writing the lyrics, was officially released. In 2010 it was reported that Sugizo had written some songs, though no further information has been given. That year, Yoshiki claimed that their new material was "pretty much the same thing, maybe a little edgier." However, in 2014 he specifically stated it will not be the same as before, adding that it will be very heavy, melodic, and "more contemporary".

Yoshiki's songwriting process begins with writing the score for each song by hand before playing it with the band. His composing style tends to make use of chords in sequences of eights or more with riff-based motifs or call-and-response phrasing. He has maintained this style for the majority of his career as a composer. Having played classical piano since he was four years old, Yoshiki claims to be as influenced by classical music as he is by rock. While also serving as the main songwriter, Yoshiki has production credit on much of X Japan's later material. During live performances, the band relies on its members (with drummer and pianist Yoshiki and guitarist and violinist Sugizo switching between their instruments) and prerecorded tracks for orchestrated strings, spoken word passages, and more recently, some of Hide's guitar parts.

== Appearance and image ==
When we played heavy music... I went the complete opposite and did something feminine. When we played ballads, I had spiky hair.

— Yoshiki, Dazed

X Japan's appearance was inspired by glam rock, Kiss, David Bowie, as well as traditional Japanese kabuki theatre, where it was customary for male actors to play female roles and dress like women. Visual kei artists still often employ feminine looks and garbs for their stage. According to Josephine Yun, "like its music, X's look was individualistic. Square-shouldered Toshi donned leather and metal, looking like a character out of the anime Gundam. Taiji dolled up in perfect, pretty glam. Pata's sleepy, backseat demeanor and whiskey bottle became his trademark, as Hide forever goaded the audience. And Yoshiki was a paradox all his own, bewitchingly effeminate one moment—and a full-force, wrist-breaking (literally) hurricane in concert the next." Will Hodgkinson of The Times described X Japan as having, "the grandiosity of Queen, the heavy-metal hysteria of Iron Maiden and the symphonic sophistication of classical music, all tied up with a healthy dose of melodrama."

Their early image was characterized by heavy make-up, dark eyeliner and eyeshadow, face-painting and high-standing hair, which one critic described as "skyscraper hair". Yoshiki's highly androgynous looks, dressed in lace and pearls, were referred to as "decadent". The band also used accessories reminiscent of glam-goth (metal jewelry, crosses). Their stage reflected the band's duality in nature: the forceful, "masculine" heavy metal songs were balanced out by Toshi's high-pitched tenor voice and Yoshiki's soft piano playing, where he would often wear long female dresses, and act effeminate.

By the release of their 1995 studio album Dahlia, the band toned its stage appearance down, cutting their hair and wearing more rock-inspired outfits. In a 2010 interview, Yoshiki stated that the abandoning of stronger make-up and outrageous outfits was a natural progression in their style; however, they still do use make-up on stage, "sometimes heavy, sometimes less", and that he still considers the band visual kei.

== Legacy and influence ==
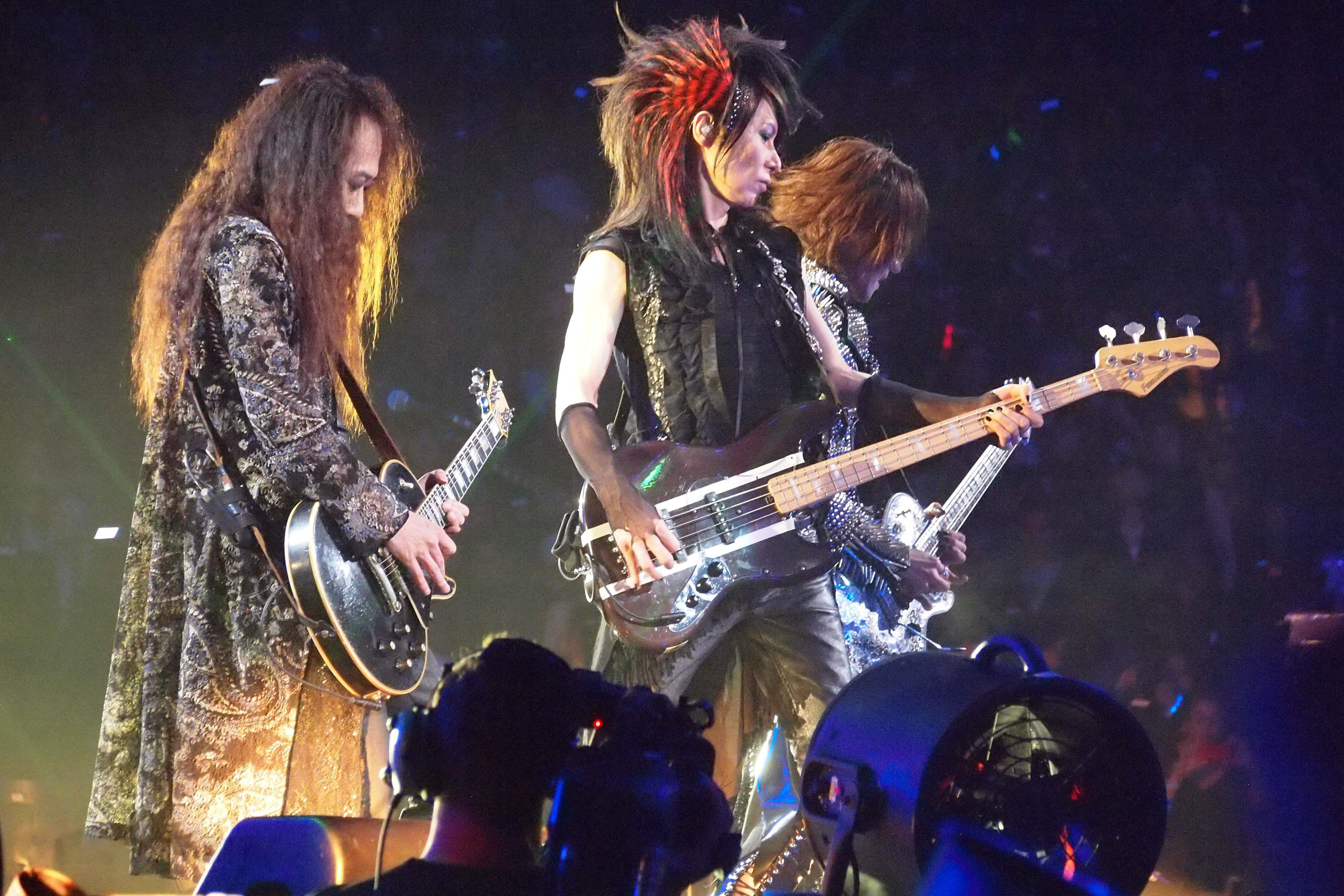
Left to right: Pata, Heath, and Sugizo at Madison Square Garden, 2014

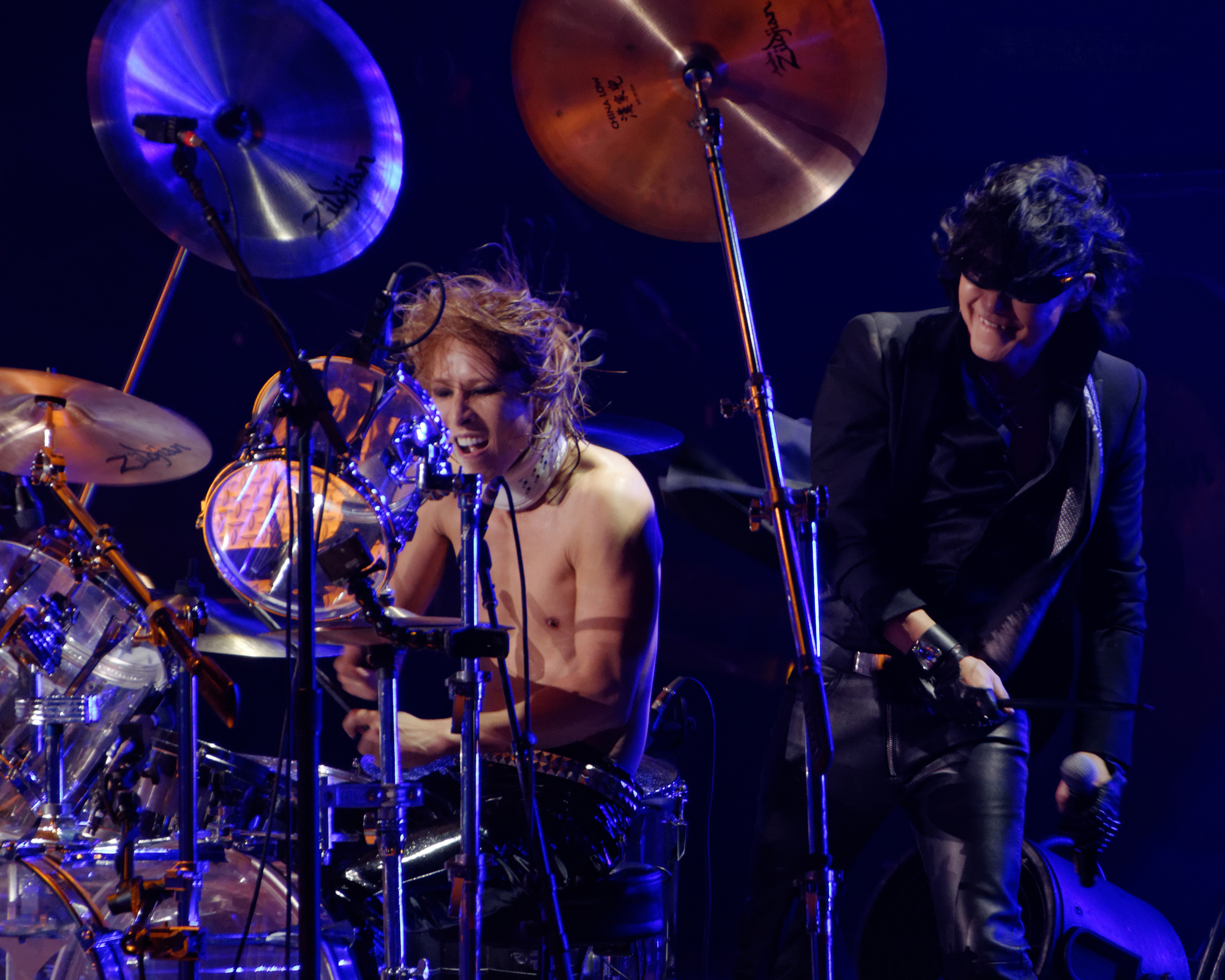
Yoshiki and Toshi at Madison Square Garden, 2014

X Japan is considered one of the founders of visual kei, a movement among Japanese musicians comparable to Western glam, with the name itself believed to have been derived from their slogan "Psychedelic Violence Crime of Visual Shock". In 2011, Yoshiki briefly described their early years and the movement's development, saying "when we started the band, the problem was we didn't belong anywhere. Because we were playing very heavy music, we were wearing tons of make-up and crazy outfits. So we couldn't belong anywhere", "[We did our own thing and] that eventually became visual kei." He added, "But visual kei is more like a spirit, it's not a music style or, you know... I think it is a freedom about describing myself, a freedom to express myself." Upon former guitarist Hide's death in 1998, less than a year after the band broke up, Billboard's Steve McClure declared it "the end of an era", explaining "X was the first generation of visual kei bands[...] For the next generation of bands, it's like: That's it. The torch has been passed to us."

Many bands and artists, most related to visual kei, count them as an influence or look up to them, including Miyavi, Dir En Grey, Kisaki, Syu and Fumiya of Galneryus, The Gazette, D, Sadie vocalist Mao, Tōru Kawauchi from 12012, Maya of LM.C, Flow, Yuuki from Unsraw, DJ Ozma, Kei of Dio – Distraught Overlord, aie from Deadman, Screw's Jin, Mari of Mary's Blood, and Daizystripper. The members of Versailles named X and Luna Sea as influences, with singer Kamijo saying "I think there isn't anyone in the Japanese music business who hasn't been influenced by them." Likewise, Leda of Galneryus and Deluhi claims he was not even interested in music until a friend played him X Japan and Luna Sea, and also declared X Japan's music his "Bible". Established musicians Dancho (Nogod), Miya (Mucc), Yuu (Merry), Akane (ex-The Scanty) and Daisuke (Jupiter) occasionally perform in a X Japan cover band called X Suginami. American musician Marty Friedman called X Japan the biggest band in visual kei and "by far the most versatile musically", and cited them as the reason he got into Japanese rock music. Kai from Esprit D'Air named X Japan as one of his top ten rock and metal bands from Japan and also covered their song "Kurenai".

In We Are X, Gene Simmons claims that if the X Japan members were "born in America or England and sang in English, they might be the biggest band in the world." Due to the band's various misfortunes with the suicide of band members, Toshi's brainwashing and lack of overseas success, X Japan has been described in The Times as "The world's unluckiest band", in an article published on Friday the 13th October, 2017. When asked in an interview if the band was unlucky, Yoshiki answered: "Kinda? I mean, you know, with so much crazy drama that has happened over the years. But at the same time, we have amazing fans around the world so I can't say 'the world's unluckiest band', but what I can say is 'the world's luckiest band'. Thanks to our fans."

The group was popular among rebellious youths, who were attracted to, as Asiaweek put it, "the tone of alienation and frustration for which X was revered." Their music was described by Asiaweek as having "an angry sound that rejected the cookie-cutter principles of Japanese society." In 1998, Radio and TV host Bryan Burton-Lewis explained "In Japan, the image that we have of the X audience is rural kids going through a rebellion phase. They put their life into being X fans: they dress like it, they breathe it." In the documentary Global Metal, Yoshiki stated that the music industry and media hated the band and would not even interview them, "but eventually we sold 20 million albums, so they had no choice".

X Japan has also been named one of the first Japanese acts to achieve mainstream success while on an independent record label. In 1990, they won the "Grand Prix New Artist of the Year" award at the 4th annual Japan Gold Disc Awards. HMV Japan ranked the band number 40 on a 2003 list of the 100 most important Japanese pop acts, and in 2010 they came in third in a poll by Oricon on which Japanese bands people want around for future generations. In 2011, Consequence of Sound named X Japan one of their Top 15 Cult Acts. In April 2012, X Japan won the Revolver Golden Gods Award for "Best International Artist". They were awarded "Most Devoted Fans" in the 2012 Loudwire Music Awards on January 17, 2013, and won the poll again two years later on February 3, 2015. Later that year, they also won the website's Best Live Band Tournament in August, beating out Pearl Jam in the final round. LA Weekly ranked X Japan tenth on an October 2014 list of the 10 Best Prog Metal Bands. In March 2017, Loudwire named X Japan the Best Metal Band from Japan writing that "their high-octane power metal and exhilarating live show make them the pinnacle of heavy music in the 'Land of the Rising Sun'."

However, X Japan has also made a mark outside of the music industry. In 1999, at the request of the Japanese government, Yoshiki composed and performed a classical song for Japan's Emperor Akihito at a celebration in honor of the tenth anniversary of his enthronement. Japan's former Prime Minister Junichiro Koizumi is a well-known fan of the band. His political party, the Liberal Democratic Party, even used X Japan's song "Forever Love" in several commercials in 2001. It was also reported that Koizumi was influential in getting the Hide Museum opened in Yokosuka in 2000.

In December 2012, Yoshiki and Toshi's hometown of Tateyama, Chiba began broadcasting an arrangement of "Forever Love" on its disaster-prevention radio system at 5:00 pm every Friday, Saturday, Sunday and national holiday. In November 2019, Tateyama Station began using the song as the departure melody for its trains.

Tony Fernandes, Chief Executive Officer of the Malaysian low-cost carrier Air Asia, revealed on his Instagram page that Yoshiki inspired him to name the long-haul carrier Air Asia X after the band.

Yoshiki stated he loved "the punkish elements" of the albums Iron Maiden and Killers by Iron Maiden. He also cited Sex Pistols, the Clash, GBH, and Chaos UK as favorite bands.

== Members ==
=== Current members ===
- Yoshiki – drums, piano, keyboards (1982–1997, 2007–2018)
- Toshi – lead vocals, occasional acoustic guitar (1982–1997, 2007–2018)
- Pata – guitar, backing vocals (1987–1997, 2007–2018)
- Sugizo – guitar, violin, backing vocals (2009–2018) as a touring musician (2008–2009)

=== Former members ===
- Yuji "Terry" Izumisawa (泉沢裕二, Izumisawa Yūji) – guitar (1982–1985; died 2002)
- Tomoyuki "Tomo" Ogata (オガタトモユキ, Ogata Tomoyuki) – guitar (1984–1985)
- Atsushi Tokuo (德應 淳, Tokuo Atsushi) – bass guitar (1984–1985)
- Kenichi "Eddie Van" Koide (小出健一, Koide Kenichi) – guitar (1985)
- Yoshifumi "Hally" Yoshida (吉田良文, Yoshida Yoshifumi) – guitar (1985)
- Kazuaki "Zen/Xenon" Mita (三田一光, Mita Kazuaki) – guitar (1985–1986)
- Hisashi "Jun/Shu" Takai (高井寿, Takai Hisashi) – guitar (1985, 1986)
- Hikaru Utaka (宇高光, Utaka Hikaru) – bass guitar (1985–1986)
- Masanori "Kerry" Takahashi (高橋雅則, Takahashi Masanori) – guitar (1986)
- Satoru Inoue (井上悟, Inoue Satoru) – guitar (1986)
- Isao Hori (堀功, Hori Isao) – guitar (1987)
- Taiji – bass guitar, occasional acoustic guitar, backing vocals (1985, 1986–1992; died 2011)
- Hide – guitar, backing vocals (1987–1997; died 1998)
- Heath – bass guitar, backing vocals (1992–1997, 2007–2018; died 2023)

X Japan still considers their deceased members to be part of the band and introduces them at every concert, sometimes playing audio/video clips of their voice/guitar for some songs.

== Discography ==
Studio albums

- Vanishing Vision (1988)
- Blue Blood (1989)
- Jealousy (1991)
- Art of Life (1993)
- Dahlia (1996)
- Untitled sixth album (TBA)

== Tours and performances ==
=== Kōhaku Uta Gassen ===
X Japan performed seven times on Kōhaku Uta Gassen, a prestigious year-end television show on NHK network.

Year	Performed song
1991 / 42nd	Silent Jealousy
1992 / 43rd	紅 (Kurenai)
1993 / 44th	Tears
1994 / 45th	Rusty Nail
1997 / 48th	Forever Love
2015 / 66th	紅白スペシャルメドレー 〜 We are X ! 〜 (Forever Love / BORN TO BE FREE)
2016 / 67th	紅 (Kurenai)
2017 / 68th	Endless Rain / Kurenai

=== Concerts ===
Tokyo Dome concerts (18)

- August 23, 1991
- January 5, 6, 7, 1992
- December 30, 31, 1993
- December 30, 31, 1994
- December 30, 31, 1995
- December 30, 31, 1996
- December 31, 1997
- March 28, 29, 30, 2008
- May 2, 3, 2009

== Awards ==
Year	Award	Category	Nomination	Result
1989	22nd Japan Cable Awards	Best New Artist	X / "Kurenai"	Won
1990	4th Japan Gold Disc Awards	Grand Prix New Artist of the Year	X	Won
1991	33rd Japan Record Awards	Pops and Rock Album Award	Jealousy	Won
2012	Revolver Golden Gods Award	Best International Artist	X Japan	Won
2016	89th Academy Awards	Academy Award for Best Original Song (long list)	"La Venus"	Nominated
2017	Neo magazine awards	Best Musical Act	X Japan	Won
2017	Neo magazine awards	Best Asian Movie	We Are X	Won
2017	SSE Live Awards	Best Event at SSE Wembley Arena	X Japan World Tour	Won
2018	Space Shower Music Video Awards	Best Music Film	We Are X	Won
