= The Buddha (2010 film) =

2010 film by David Grubin

The Buddha: The Story of Siddhartha is a 2010 PBS documentary film directed by David Grubin and narrated by Richard Gere. It follows the story of Gautama Buddha's life and discusses the history and teachings of Buddhism. The film was nominated for the Primetime Emmy Award for Outstanding Writing for a Nonfiction Programming.

== See also ==
- Depictions of Gautama Buddha in film
