= Born to Be Free (X Japan song) =

Single by X Japan
- Released: November 6, 2015
- Genre: Heavy metal; symphonic metal
- Length: 5:33
- Label: EMI
- Songwriter: Yoshiki
- Producer: Yoshiki

X Japan singles chronology
"Jade" (2011)	"Born to Be Free" (2015)	"Angel" (2023)

"Born to Be Free" is a song by Japanese rock band X Japan, released on November 6, 2015.

It reached number 21 on the Billboard Japan Hot 100. It topped the iTunes rock charts in France, Sweden, Mexico, Peru, Argentina, Singapore, Taiwan, Hong Kong, Macau, and Japan.

== Background and release ==
Yoshiki said that he wants listeners to interpret "Born to Be Free" as a reflection of their own personal journey: "All of us are born free to dream what we want without any limits." It was recorded in Los Angeles at Yoshiki's own recording studio, which was formerly known as Larrabee East, and mixed by Chris Lord-Alge.

The song was first unveiled on July 1, 2010, at Club Nokia in Los Angeles during the filming of its music video, which took place following an acoustic set by the band. It was played live by X Japan for the next five years.

The final recording made its debut as an audio stream, limited to 24-hours, on Metal Hammer's website on October 13, 2015. The web-traffic caused the site to crash several times. "Born to Be Free" was made available for download on November 6, marking its official release. It was the second single from X Japan's unreleased album. It was used in a television commercial for the film Last Knights.

In an interview with Metal Hammer on November 8, 2017, Yoshiki said that "Born to Be Free" was his favorite X Japan song. He said, "That's the song I really enjoy playing. A lot of songs like X, or Kurenai, were very hard for me to play. They're fast, and heavy. So when I'm playing, I'm enjoying them, but I'm also suffering at the same time. But 'Born To Be Free' makes me very happy."

== Music videos ==
A music video of the band performing "Born to Be Free" in front of a live audience was filmed at Club Nokia on July 1, 2010. The video was directed by Yoshiki and, with cooperation of Panasonic, was shot using a new prototype 3D camera in addition to regular 2D cameras. Comic book creator Stan Lee makes a cameo appearance as Satan. The footage and music video have not yet been officially released.

A second music video, created using various live footage of the band and testimonials from fans, was premiered on Kerrang!'s website on November 19, 2015.

== Personnel ==
X Japan

- Toshi – vocals
- Sugizo – guitar, violin
- Pata – guitar
- Heath – bass
- Yoshiki – drums, piano

Additional musicians and production

- Katie Fitzgerald – spoken word
- Chris Lord-Alge – mixing

== Charts ==
Chart (2015)	Peak position
Billboard Japan Hot 100	21
