= Jade (song) =

Single by X Japan
- Released: June 28, 2011
- Recorded: Extasy Recording Studios (LA), Capitol Records (LA), Sound City (JP)
- Genre: Heavy metal; symphonic metal
- Length: 6:19
- Label: EMI (NA & EU)
- Songwriter(s): Yoshiki
- Producer(s): Yoshiki

X Japan singles chronology
"Scarlet Love Song -Buddha Mix-" (2011)	"Jade" (2011)	"Born to Be Free" (2015)

Music video
- "Jade" on YouTube

"Jade" is a song by Japanese Visual kei band X Japan, released on June 28, 2011, in Europe, North and South America, and on July 13 in Japan and Southeast Asia. It is the band's third single since reuniting in 2007 and the second to feature newest member Sugizo on guitar, as well as their first worldwide release.

== Background and release ==
With "Jade", Yoshiki wanted to create a song that would show how X Japan is "evolving", but that still retained "the beautiful melodies and aggressiveness." He stated he felt a lot of pressure when writing it, as the band knew they wanted to expand outside Japan into the Western market. The lyrics are entirely in English, with the exception of a single line. With the song, he wanted to express the pain that he, as well as the band, has experienced, saying, "you should just accept it and be positive about it."

Originally set for March 15, 2011, the band decided to postpone the release of "Jade" due to the March 11 Tōhoku earthquake and tsunami. "Jade" reached number one on iTunes Spain, Sweden and Japan. It reached number 19 on Billboard Japan's Japan Hot 100.

"Jade" was the first single from X Japan's unreleased album.

After being unavailable for almost two years, the track is available again on iTunes in most parts of the world.

== Music video ==
A music video was recorded in January 2010 and was featured on the X Japan Showcase in L.A. Premium Prototype DVD released that September. Directed by Dean Karr, it was filmed as the band performed on top of the Kodak Theatre in Hollywood, California, and has the sound of the audience added to the audio.

== Personnel ==
X Japan

- Toshi – vocals
- Sugizo – guitar
- Pata – guitar
- Heath – bass
- Yoshiki – drums, guitar and orchestration

Production

- David Campbell – orchestration
- Andy Wallace – mixing
- Stephen Marcussen – mastering

== Charts ==
Chart (2011)	Peak position
Billboard Japan Hot 100	19
