= The Legend of Buddha =

- DVD cover
- Directed by: Shamboo S. Phalke
- Written by: Sujatha
- Produced by: Dr. Chandrasekaran V.
- Starring: Bridgit Mendler
- Cinematography: Ananthan A.
- Edited by: V. T. Vijayan
- Music by: Bharadwaj
- Production companies: Pentamedia Graphics; Kingdom Animasia Inc.
- Release date: 22 October 2004
- Running time: 90 minutes
- Countries: India; Singapore; Philippines
- Language: English

The Legend of Buddha is a 2004 animated film directed by Shamboo S. Phalke. The film tells the story of Prince Siddhartha Gautama, who leaves his kingdom to become the spiritual leader, Buddha. The film was submitted for the Academy Award for Best Animated Feature at the 77th Academy Awards but was not nominated.

== Plot ==
Mahamaya has a dream where a white elephant visits her and she miraculously becomes pregnant. An astrologer tells Suddhodana and Mahamaya that they will have a son. Mahamaya gives birth to the baby boy in the garden under a tree. The astrologer says the boy will be a different leader who will save mankind. Suddhodana says he would rather the child rule the kingdom and promises to provide him a life of luxury. The boy is named Siddhartha.

Asita bursts into tears upon seeing baby Siddhartha, saying he will save humankind. He also predicts that Mahamaya will die soon. Mahamaya dies in her sleep, and Siddhartha grows up having a sheltered life of a prince. Suddhodana sends Siddhartha to Vishwamitra to prepare him for eventually becoming king. When Vishwamitra begins teaching Siddhartha, he is surprised that he already knows how to recite scriptures and is skilled in counting and arithmetic, as well. He bows down to Siddhartha in reverence.

Once, Siddhartha's cousin shoots his arrow at a swan, and Siddhartha says they must nurse it back to health and let it back into the sky. Asita says the bird belongs to Siddhartha because he had mercy and protected it. On a stroll around the countryside with his father, Siddhartha is initially mesmerized by the beauty of nature. Then, he also sees pain in nature, such as several animals being preyed upon by others, and hunters killing animals. He becomes sad at this sight of power and exploitation.

As Siddhartha grows up, he continues to think about the suffering. Suddhodana does not understand why Siddhartha is not happy even though he has all the luxuries of a prince. Suddhodana arranges a festival to find Siddhartha a suitable woman. Siddhartha chooses Yasodhara, the daughter of King Suprabuddha. Siddhartha wins the warrior competition, proving himself worthy of Yasodhara's hand in marriage. They get married in an extravagant ceremony. Suddhodana tells Yasodhara that no mention of death, pain, or sickness should be made to Siddhartha to keep him happy. At night, Siddhartha has strange dreams about a larger purpose. In the morning, Siddhartha asks his maid what lies beyond the palace gates. He resolves to journey into the city to experience the world beyond his palace for the first time. Suddhodana orders that Siddhartha only see good in his visit so weak populations like the blind and elderly are ordered locked in their homes for the day. Siddhartha is flattered to see so many happy people under his rule until he sees an old man and someone explains to him that everyone becomes old and dies eventually. He becomes disturbed upon learning this reality of life.

Siddhartha realizes that happiness and comfort are temporary. That night, Suddhodana has a dream about Siddhartha's future role. Siddhartha asks Suddhodana to stop sheltering him and the next day goes back into the city disguised as a common man. He witnesses a sick man die and is shocked to learn that everyone experiences illness and eventually dies. He sees funerals and realizes that life is only temporary. During the visit, a servant tells Siddhartha that he's had a baby boy. Siddhartha tells the servant to name the boy Rahula, which stands for snake or a rope that ties him back. Siddhartha decides to give up his comforts in his life for the happiness of mankind. He quietly leaves the palace on Kanthaka in the middle of the night. At the gate, he is stopped by Mara, who tries to tempt him, but Siddhartha is no longer bound by desire. Halfway through his journey, Siddhartha leaves Kanthaka behind in his goal to renounce everything. Siddhartha meets some ascetics, who follow him as he meditates under a tree. He meditates until he reaches the brink of death.

A woman named Sujata offers Buddha some milk upon seeing him emaciated. He realizes that he needs to maintain a healthy mind and that he needs to find The Middle Path, a balance between asceticism and indulgence. The ascetics who had followed him leave him, upset that he gave up his renunciation. Mara appears again to try and prevent Siddhartha from spreading his knowledge to mankind, but he fails. Siddhartha reveals the Eightfold Path as the way to Nirvana. The ascetics come back and ask to be his disciples. Now known as Buddha, he travels across the country to spread his knowledge about enlightenment. He stops a king's sacrifice of 100 lambs, teaching him to protect all life. He advises the king to ban all slaughter in his kingdom. Buddha meets a human flesh-eating monster, but teaches him that harming others does not bring peace of mind.

Buddha visits the palace and realizes that the bonds tying him to Yasodhara and Rahula are too strong. He shares his knowledge with Suddhodana, Yasodhara, and Rahula. He tells Yasodhara he must return to seek truth. He preached about compassion and good deeds, founding the Buddhist religion.

== Voice cast ==
- Neiel Cavin as Siddharth/Buddha
- Ben Flax as Suddhodana
- Ariela Morgenstern as Mahamaya
- Bridgit Mendler as Child Siddharth
- Natalie Saibel as Yasodhara
- Danielle Flax as Pushpika
- Nick Rogers as Devadatta
- Jomial Jones as Angulimala
- Kirk Lombard as Mara
- Robin Livingston as Channa
- Nick Whitney as Asita
- Gene Ptak as Narrator

== Production ==
The film was co-produced by India, the Economic Development Board of Singapore, and the Philippines. Japeth Bautista served as the overseas director.

== Soundtrack ==
All music is composed by Bharadwaj.

Track listing
No.	Title	Singer(s)	Length
1.	"Every Thing Is"	Bharadwaj R., Rekha Ravindran
2.	"Every Thing Is (Remix)"	Bharadwaj R., Rekha Ravindran
3.	"Happy Days Are Always"	Bharadwaj R., Rekha Ravindran
4.	"I Am Felling So"	Bharadwaj R., Rekha Ravindran
5.	"Na Da Rupam"	Bharadwaj R., Rekha Ravindran
6.	"Sani Pani Saa"	Bharadwaj R., Rekha Ravindran
7.	"U Shall Be The King"	Bharadwaj R., Rekha Ravindran

== Reception ==
A critic from The Hindu wrote, "the story is so powerful and full of emotion that you can appreciate the magnificent effort put into it".

== Home media ==
Around early 2007, the film was made available on DVD in English and Hindi. The film was also released on DVD in France under the title La Légende de Bouddha.

== See also ==
- Depictions of Gautama Buddha in film
- List of Indian animated films
