= Buddha (manga) =

Manga by Osamu Tezuka

- Cover of volume 6 from the Osamu Tezuka Manga Complete Works collection, featuring Siddhartha Gautama (Buddha)

ブッダ (Budda)
- Genre: Historical fiction
- Manga
- Written by: Osamu Tezuka
- Published by: Ushio Shuppan
- English publisher: NA: Vertical; UK: HarperCollins
- Magazine: Kibō no tomo – Comic Tom
- Original run: September 1972 – December 1983
- Volumes: 14 (Japanese edition); 8 (Worldwide edition)
- Anime film
- Directed by: Kozo Morishita
- Produced by: Makoto Tezuka
- Written by: Reiko Yoshida
- Music by: Michiru Oshima
- Studio: Tezuka Productions (production); Toei Animation (animation)
- Released: May 28, 2011
- Runtime: 110 minutes
- Anime film

Buddha 2
- Directed by: Toshiaki Komura
- Produced by: Makoto Tezuka
- Written by: Reiko Yoshida
- Music by: Michiru Oshima
- Studio: Tezuka Productions (production); Toei Animation (animation)
- Released: February 8, 2014
- Runtime: 90 minutes

Buddha (Japanese: ブッダ, Hepburn: Budda) is a Japanese manga series written and illustrated by Osamu Tezuka. It is an interpretation of the life of Gautama Buddha, the founder of Buddhism. The critically acclaimed series is often referred to as a visually explicit yet humorous and thought-provoking portrayal of the Buddha's life; the series itself has become a staple text in Buddhist temples for young adults and teens to learn about the Buddha's life. The series began in September 1972 and ended in December 1983, as one of Tezuka's last epic manga works.

Buddha has over 20 million copies in circulation and won Eisner Awards in 2004 and 2005. Due to differences between the ways in which Japanese and English are read, the American volumes published by Vertical Inc. are presented as mirror images of Tezuka's original work so they can be read from left to right, rather than from right to left. Nearly three decades after the manga was completed, an anime film adaptation was released in 2011. A second film was released in 2014.

== Plot ==
In ancient India, the lives of many people are plagued by drought, famine, constant warfare and injustices in the caste system. The intertwining lives of many unhappy souls are drawn together by the birth of the young prince Siddhartha, who embarks on a spiritual journey and becomes Gautama Buddha, "the Enlightened One", and attempts to bring about a spiritual rebirth of the people in this desperate age.

== Characters ==
- Siddhartha Gautama (Sakyamuni Buddha): The main character of the Buddha series and prince of the Shakya tribe. He is born midway into book 1; shortly after his birth his mother Maya dies. The first book mentions omens that seemed to symbolize Siddhartha's future. In book 2, he is a child growing bored of the privileged life of a prince. He leaves the palace towards the end of the book to become a monk. In book 3, he is a struggling monk. In book 4, after many trials in the Forest of Uruvela, Buddha achieves enlightenment. He continues to teach his disciples and inspire others until his death in book 8.
- Chapra: A fictional character from the lower Shudra caste who decides to make a better life for himself. After saving the life of a well-known Kosalan general Budai, Chapra is adopted by him as his own son, under the belief that Chapra is a Kshatriya warrior orphan, initially unknown to him that he's a Shudra, but later on knew the secret but still shuts up about it. After growing up, Chapra's true heritage is revealed when his mother shows up, resulting in conflict for Chapra. Chapra eventually decides to escape with her after the truth of his caste is revealed and the two are killed by Kosalan soldiers, seen by Tata and the cause of his vengeance against Kosala.
- Princess Yashodara: A beautiful princess who loved Siddhartha and is also the latter's cousin. He married her against his will, and together they had a son named Rāhula. Siddhartha left on the day Rahula was born. She stayed on Kapilavastu with Siddhartha's parents.
- Bandaka: An arrogant archer who appears in book 1 and 2. He was in love with Yashodara and fought Buddha for her hand in marriage. After Buddha left to pursue enlightenment, Bandaka convinced Buddha's father to name him heir to the Shakyan throne but still failed to win Yashodara over. He then resigns himself to taking a plump noblewoman as his wife, fathering Devadatta (also later on has Ananda), and is later killed with a javelin while fighting the invading Kosalan army.
- Prasennajit: The ruler of Kosala, and a former wrestler. He married a slave from Kapilavastu, tricked to think she was a Kshatriya, and takes over Kapilavastu when he finds out the truth. When he objects to his son Virudhaka releasing Kapilavatsu, Virudhaka imprisons his father, claiming he is mentally unfit to rule. In his cell, Prasennajit gradually wanes physically and mentally until Buddha convinces his son to release him. He dies shortly afterward, reduced to a mere beggar, trying in vain to call upon King Bimbisara to assist him on retaking the throne.
- Virudhaka: Prasennajit's son. After learning of his mother's true caste, he ostracizes her to the slave quarters and later orders her to be killed with the other slaves when plague breaks out among them (but in secret, he mourned her death). For tricking his father, Virudhaka begins a gradual extermination of Buddha's tribe until Buddha shows him that all he's accomplished is to increase the suffering he already felt. He is sometimes called Prince Crystal due to the Lapis Lazuli set in his forehead. He became Buddha's devotee after he got the throne and one of his nobles built a Buddhist temple.
- Bimbisara: The king of Magadha, whom Asaji prophesies will be killed by his son. This torments Bimbisara all his life. Slowly Drugged by Devadatta, Bimbisara is overthrown by his son Ajasattu and locked in the same tower he jailed his son in for attempting to kill Buddha where he gradually starves to death. On his death bed, Bimbisara meets Buddha one last time and asks Buddha to save his son. In his final hours, he regrets not showing his son more affection, instead consumed by paranoia that his son would kill him as prophesied, forgiving whatever Ajatasattu had done to him.
- Prince Ajatasattu: Bimbisara's son, who is imprisoned in book 6 because he shot and almost killed Buddha with an arrow. He falls in love with a blue-eyed blonde slave named Yudelka, and vows revenge on his father when she is murdered. Ajatasattu, with the help of Devadatta, overthrows his father. The guilt causes him to have a malignant tumor, which Buddha cures. In doing so, Buddha sees him smile for the first time, and pronounces "It's in the heart of man... that God exists.". He later on becomes one of Buddha's devotees.
- Tatta: A fictional thief of the 'Pariah', the Untouchable, making his status even lower than that of the slave caste. As a child, Tatta is very close to nature and has the unique ability to possess animals, which the Brahmin Naradatta takes great advantage of. In volume 1, after befriending the slave Chapra, his mother and sister are murdered by the rampaging armies of Kosala. After Kosala's soldiers execute Chapra and 'Moms', Tatta vows revenge upon the kingdom of Kosala. As he grows up, Tatta becomes a bandit and reveals his plan of vengeance is to show the outside world to the sheltered child, Siddhartha, in hopes of persuading him to vanquish Kosala when he becomes king. In book 3, he agrees to stop being a bandit, in exchange of Siddhartha returning with him in a decade. In book 5, he becomes a lay disciple to Buddha, unwilling to become a monk because it would mean cutting his hair. Despite Buddha's attempts to convince him otherwise, Tatta is unable to forgive the Kosalans for killing those close to him and joins a renegade Shakyan army led by a one-eyed Shakyan who sought revenge for the atrocities inflicted on them by Crystal Prince. He dies in the last book fighting the Kosalan army, killed by Crystal Prince's elephant.
- Migaila: A bandit whom Buddha falls in love with in book 2. Her eyes are burnt out on order from Buddha's father for scheming to marry him which leaves her blind for the rest of the series however she is able to "see" the world mysteriously. After a stillbirth, she becomes fatally ill with a total body rash, that leaves her terrifying to look at. Siddartha saves her life with Tatta by sucking the poison out with their mouths. She is Tatta's wife, and they have one son in book 4, a stillborn, and triplets, introduced in book 7. She knew that Tatta is still obsessed on vengeance, and accepted that her partner will die on his quest.
- Dhepa: A samanna (a non-Brahmin monk), whose philosophy is that humans were meant to suffer. He burns out one of his eyes to join Tatta and Migaila. Buddha befriends Dhepa in book 3, but the two part ways when Buddha decides against Dhepa's lifestyle. Despite ridiculing Buddha's teachings and even attempting to kill him at one point, Buddha saves Dhepa's life in book 5 whereupon Dhepa becomes his disciple after hearing series of his sermons.
- Asaji: In volume 3, Siddhartha and Dhepa are sheltered by a huntsman and his family. In return, the huntsman asks the monks if his eldest son, Asaji, can join them on their travels. Judging Asaji by his dimwitted look and runny nose, Dhepa and Siddhartha refuse, attempting to flee from Asaji by any means necessary. When Asaji catches a fever after pursuing the monks through the monsoon season, Siddhartha is determined to save him. Siddhartha cures Asaji by sucking the poisonous pus from his body. Meanwhile, the unconscious Asaji encounters a god in a vision that tells him in ten years time he will be devoured by beasts in payment for his father's meaningless hunting. As time passes, when Siddhartha is separated from the other monks, Asaji successfully and precisely predicts natural disasters. His predictions are a gift from a god. Eventually, he is brought forth before King Bimbisara and prophesies his fate and that of many other palace nobles. When Siddhartha undertakes the trials of the forest, he is astounded that Asaji is completely fearless of his gruesome destiny. When the moment of truth arrives, Asaji approaches a litter of starving wolf-cubs and sacrifices himself to the ferocious parents that tear him apart, much to Siddhartha's horror. His death made Buddha question whatever trials a person can do to achieve enlightenment.
- Devadatta: One of Buddha's first disciples. The son of Bandaka, Devadatta had a difficult childhood. As a child, he is forced to flee from Kapilavastu and meets Naradatta, learning to live with animals. When he returns to civilization, he is exploited by others to gain power, and sees a powerless old woman named Gragha die. As a result, he resolves "I'll be a strong human, the strongest alive!" He met Tatta when looking for a warrior, and through Tatta, Devadatta met the Buddha. He leaves the sect when he is not chosen to be Buddha's successor and attempts to form his own sect by stealing Buddha's followers, and with the Crystal Prince's support, tried to make a rival subsect with the followers he fooled (in which Mogallana and Sariputta took back). When that fails, Devadatta plots to kill Buddha; first by dropping a boulder on him, then by having an elephant stampede him. When his initial attempts fail, Devadatta poisons his nails but accidentally injures himself with them when he trips. In his final moments, he reveals that he hated the Buddha because he wanted to be just like him but couldn't.
- Visakha: Visakha is the leader of a town suffering from a plague, which took her parents' lives. She is betrothed to Sukanda, a knight tasked with guarding the city. She meets Siddartha for the first time, when he and Dhepa rest in the town to save Asaji from a nearly fatal illness. She falls in love with him and tries to keep him in her city. Tatta, along with his bandits, then invade the town, rescuing Siddartha, and taking Viskha with them. The bandits also burn the town. Sukanda, comes to rescue her, but realizing she does not love him, commits suicide. Siddartha, Tatta, and Visakha part ways. Years later, Siddartha comes upon the remains of the town and meets Visakha again. She is the only resident of the town and is addicted to hallucinatory potions. Siddartha rescues her; when she eventually sobers, she becomes a disciple, following Buddha and Ananda on their journey.
- Sujata: Sujata first meets Siddartha as a young girl. She saves his life by feeding him, when he nearly starves from fasting during an ordeal. Later she saves him yet again, having fallen in love with him. She's eventually bitten by a cobra. Siddartha saves her life by pulling a soul back into her body, with instruction from Brahman. This is also the first time we see the recurring visual motif of interconnected souls.
- Ananda: Ananda is the maternal half-brother of Devadetta as mentioned briefly in book 3. However, the both of them don't seem to know that they are blood-related. A former criminal who becomes one of Buddha's major disciples. The devil Mara protected him after Ananda's father offered him in exchange for sparing his life. Following his mother's murder, Ananda seeks revenge on all humanity until Buddha saved his life. Ananda then becomes Buddha's personal attendant and companion although visions of hell and death continue to haunt him. He later on becomes Buddha's assistant until his nirvana.
- Lata: A pretty former slave with whom Ananda falls in love. She has difficulty speaking, but recovered after being healed by Buddha. Lata cuts off her hair to achieve enlightenment, despite being still in love with Ananda. She dies after receiving a snake bite by the snake sent by the demoness Mara meant for Buddha in book 7.
- Angulimala:, also known as Ahimsa, A ruthless killer who works with Ananda and tries to kill Buddha. He is known to wear the fingers of his victims as a necklace around his neck. He ends up changing his ways thanks to Buddha's guidance, and died on the hole he got stuck.
- Naradatta: A monk who is turned into a feral state for forty years as punishment for killing several animals in order to save one human (which is Chapra). He becomes a mentor for Devadatta. Naradatta dies in the last book, moments after he is forgiven for his murder and returned to his human state.
- Yatala: A twenty-foot giant. The son of a slave who studied herbs and plants, Yatala's father gave him a potion that would make him grow to be powerful and invincible. His parents were killed shortly after he received the potion which caused him to grow twenty feet high by adulthood. Yatala then killed the elephant that killed his parents and wandered off, killing livestock and villagers alike, and terrorizing villages. Many tried to kill him unsuccessfully, including a person with a bazooka. Finally, Virudhaka, or Prince Crystal, tamed him by offering him a position within the Kosalan palace guard. However, Yatala was angered by how Virudhaka abused his mother simply because of her caste and escaped whereupon he met Buddha who shows him how Virudhaka is suffering as well. He later went to work for the King of Magadha before shaving his head and becoming Buddha's disciple.
- Master Asita: Naradatta's master. He appears in the first book briefly and sends Naradatta to find a man with the power to save the world. He later goes to the baby prince Siddharta and gives him blessings from Brahma and Indra. He later curses Naradatta for killing several animals to save the life of one human. He was also shown to have siddhis.
- Brahman: Supreme universal Spirit. Appearing frequently to Buddha as a wizened old man, Brahman sets Siddhartha on the path to seeking a solution to suffering. After Buddha obtained enlightenment, Brahman bestowed him with the title of Buddha. After the Buddha died in book 8, Brahman personally escorted the Buddha to the afterlife where he promised to reveal what awaited those who pass into death.
- Yudelka: A pretty Kushan 'slave' who is a worker in Magadha with whom Ajatasattu falls in love during his imprisonment in a tower. She is later killed after guards hear about their plan to escape.
- Moggalana and Sariputta: Both are introduced in book 7 and are Buddha's future 'heirs' according to Buddha. Both have psychic powers. Both died before Buddha achieved his Nirvana.

== Themes ==
- Pratītyasamutpāda: The interconnectedness of life is highlighted first, in Master Asita's story of his master, Gosala, being saved by animals. In the story, a rabbit immolates itself to save his life. Later on, Assaji similarly sacrifices himself to be consumed by a pack of starving baby wolves.
- Impermanence: Throughout the story, characters go through many ups and down – kings are imprisoned by their own sons, murderers become holy men, and numerous characters die, emphasizing the impermanence of life.

== List of titles ==
1. Kapilavastu: Prince Siddhartha (the future Buddha) is born at towards the end of the manga.
2. The Four Encounters: Siddhartha rejects his heritage.
3. Devadatta: Siddhartha, accompanied by Dhepa and Assaji, visit a plague stricken town.
4. The Forest of Uruvela: Buddha visits the Forest of Uruvela, beyond which awaits enlightenment.
5. Deer Park: Buddha's divinity is tested as he attempts to thwart a war.
6. Ananda: Buddha confronts Ananda, who is possessed by his eternal enemy Mara.
7. Prince Ajatasattu: Devadatta becomes a power hungry monk with Prince Ajatasattu under his tutelage.
8. Jetavana: Buddha, teaching until his last breath, finds Nirvana.

== Anime films ==
In 2009, an animated feature-length film adaptation titled Tezuka Osamu no Buddha – Akai Sabaku yo! Utsukushiku (English title: Buddha: The Great Departure) was announced. The film was directed by Kozo Morishita, produced by Tezuka Productions, animated by Toei Animation and distributed by Toei Company and Warner Bros. Pictures. The film was released on May 28, 2011, during the celebrations of the 750th memorial of Shinran Shonin, founder of the Jōdo Shinshū sect. Rock band X Japan performed the theme "Scarlet Love Song", composed by band leader Yoshiki at Morishita's request.

A second film, Buddha 2: Tezuka Osamu no Buddha ~Owarinaki Tabi~ (BUDDHA2 手塚治虫のブッダ 終りなき旅), was released on February 8, 2014. Ayumi Hamasaki recorded "Pray", composed by Kunio Tago and arranged by Yuta Nakano, as the theme song of the film. The 14th Dalai Lama appeared on a Tokyo MX TV special on January 18, 2014, to state his approval. After seeing the film a month before it premiered in Japan, he said, "I am very thankful to have the world of the Buddha be spread by the film."

Originally, a series of three films was planned. However, the production of the third film was stopped for financial reasons.

== Reception ==
Buddha is considered to be one of the greatest manga of all time, and often considered to be among Tezuka's best works. Craig Thompson called Buddha "the opus of Japan's greatest cartoonist, and a high watermark for the medium." Chester Brown stated that "Tezuka's dramatic skills make the pages fly by... his drawings add to the impact of the work; he places his lively, cartoony figures in beautifully rendered landscapes." Scott McCloud called Buddha "... one of Tezuka's true masterpieces."

Critic Andrew D. Arnold, in his review for Time Magazine titled "Learn from the Master", stated: "Filled with beauty, cruelty, drama, comedy, romance and violence, Osamu Tezuka's "Buddha" encompasses the entirety of life in a masterpiece of graphic literature. Deeply moral but never moralistic, "Buddha" merges the delight of cartooning with the epic seriousness of one of the great religions, becoming a thing wholly unto itself. Even if you can't achieve satori with "Buddha", you can open up another world."

Buddha has over 20 million copies in circulation. The English release of the manga won Best U.S. Edition of Foreign Material at the 2004 and 2005 Eisner Awards and received a nomination in 2006. It also won the award for Best American Edition of Foreign Material at the 2004 and 2005 Harvey Awards. The film was nominated for the 2012 Japan Academy Prize for Animation of the Year.

== See also ==
- List of Osamu Tezuka manga
- Osamu Tezuka's Star System
- Depictions of Gautama Buddha in film
