= Angel (X Japan song) =

Single by X Japan
- Released: July 28, 2023
- Genre: Symphonic metal
- Length: 4:35
- Label: Melodee
- Songwriter(s): Yoshiki
- Producer(s): Yoshiki

X Japan singles chronology
| "Born to Be Free" (2015) | "Angel" (2023) |

Audio video
- "Angel" on YouTube

"Angel" is a song by Japanese rock band X Japan. It was released on July 28, 2023, through Melodee Music, as the first new material released by the group since the single "Born to Be Free" in 2015. The song's music and lyrics were written by band leader Yoshiki, who also took the photo for the single jacket. This is the last X Japan's single featuring Heath to be released during his lifetime before his death in 2023.

The release of the single took place a few days after Elon Musk rebranded the social media platform Twitter as "X", leading Yoshiki to publicly state that the band already own the trademark for "X Japan". "Angel" debuted at number one on the Oricon Daily Singles Chart.

== Charts ==
Chart performance for "Angel"
| Chart (2023) | Peak position |
|---|---|
| Japan Download (Billboard Japan) | 5 |
| Japan Digital Singles (Oricon) | 5 |
