= The Buddha and His Dhamma =

Holy book of Navayana Buddhism

- Title page for The Buddha and His Dhamma (1957)
- Author: B. R. Ambedkar
- Language: English
- Publisher: Siddhartha College Publications, Mumbai
- Publication date: 1957
- Publication place: India
- Pages: 599
- Followed by: Dr. Babasheb Ambedkar: Writings and Speeches, Vol. 12. Unpublished writings; Ancient Indian commerce; Notes on laws; Waiting for a visa; Miscellaneous notes, etc.

The Buddha and His Dhamma, is a 1957 treatise on Buddha's life and philosophy. The last work of Indian statesman and scholar B. R. Ambedkar, it is treated as a scripture in the Navayana Buddhist movement he founded. It parts from all major traditions (both Theravada and Mahayana) in arguing that the Buddha gave dukkha, avijja and nibbana socio-political significance and only later monastics pessimistically reinterpreted them as ontological.

== Publication history ==
The Buddha and His Dhamma was first published in 1957 in the year following Ambedkar's death on 6 December 1956. Written in English, the book has been translated to many languages, including Hindi, Gujarati, Telugu, Tamil, Marathi, Malayalam, Bengali and Kannada.

It was republished in 1979 as the eleventh volume of Ambedkar's collected writings and speeches, with a list of sources and an index.

B.R. Ambedkar mentioned that it is one of the three books which he believed to form a set for the proper understanding of Buddhism. The other two books are:

- Buddha and Karl Marx; and
- Revolution and Counter-Revolution in Ancient India.

== In popular culture ==
A Hindi-language film, A Journey of Samyak Buddha, is based on The Buddha and His Dhamma.

== See also ==
- A Journey of Samyak Buddha
- B. R. Ambedkar bibliography

== Bibliography ==
- Ambedkar, Bhimrao Ramji (2011). Rathore, Aakash Singh; Verma, Ajay (eds.). The Buddha and his Dhamma: A critical edition. Oxford University Press. ISBN 9780198068679.
- Baumann, Martin (1991). "Neo-Buddhistische Konzeptionen in Indien und England: Zum 100. Geburtstag Bhimrao Ramji Ambedkars". Zeitschrift für Religions- und Geistesgeschichte, 43 (2), pp. 97–116.
- Fiske, Adele & Emmrich, Christoph (2004). The use of Buddhist scriptures in B.R. Ambedkar's The Buddha and His Dhamma. [In] Jondhale, Surendra; Beltz, Johannes (eds.). Reconstructing the World: B.R. Ambedkar and Buddhism in India. New Delhi: Oxford University Press.
- Sangharakshita (1986). "The Buddha and his Dhamma". Ambedkar and Buddhism (PDF) (1st ed.). Windhorse. Archived from the original (PDF) on 23 September 2020.
