= On the Verge of Destruction 1992.1.7 Tokyo Dome Live =

On the Verge of Destruction 1992.1.7 Tokyo Dome Live may refer to:

- On the Verge of Destruction 1992.1.7 Tokyo Dome Live (album), a live album released by X Japan on January 1, 1995
- On the Verge of Destruction 1992.1.7 Tokyo Dome Live (video), a live VHS/LD released by X Japan on November 1, 1992
