= Complete II =

Compilation album by X Japan
- Released: October 1, 2005
- Genres: Heavy metal; speed metal; power metal; progressive metal; symphonic metal; glam metal
- Label: Columbia

X Japan compilation chronology
Best: Fan's Selection (2001)	Complete II (2005)	The World: X Japan Hatsu no Zensekai Best (2014)

Complete II is a box set released October 1, 2005. On ten CDs and nine DVDs it collects all studio and live albums, and all DVDs that X Japan released after changing their name from X, along with two DVDs containing previously unreleased and rare material from the band's earlier career. It reached number 92 on the Oricon chart.

== CDs ==
- Art of Life
- Dahlia
- Live Live Live Tokyo Dome 1993-1996 (2 discs)
- Live Live Live Extra
- Live in Hokkaido 1995.12.4 Bootleg
- Art of Life Live
- The Last Live (3 discs)

== DVDs ==
- Dahlia the Video Visual Shock#5 Part I and Part II
- Dahlia Tour Final 1996 (2 discs)
- X Japan Clips II
- The Last Live Video (2 discs)
- Art of Life 1993.12.31 Tokyo Dome
- X Film Gig 1993 Visual Shock Kougeki Saikai (previously unreleased)
1. "Prologue ~ World Anthem" (S.E.)
2. "Silent Jealousy"
3. "Sadistic Desire"
4. "Stab Me in the Back"
5. "Week End"
6. "Celebration"
7. "Drum Solo"
8. "Art of Life"
9. "Kurenai"
10. "Orgasm"
11. "Endless Rain"
12. "Joker"
13. "X"
14. "Say Anything" (S.E.)
- Super Rare Clips 1987 Xclamation - Kurenai (previously limited released in 1987 and again in 1988)
1. "Xclamation"
2. "Stab Me in the Back"
3. "Kurenai"
