= Live Live Live Tokyo Dome 1993–1996 =

Live album by X Japan
- Released: October 15, 1997
- Recorded: Tokyo Dome
- Genre: Heavy metal, power metal, speed metal
- Label: Polydor

X Japan live chronology
On the Verge of Destruction 1992.1.7 Tokyo Dome Live (1995)	Live Live Live; Tokyo Dome 1993–1996 (1997)	Live Live Live Extra (1997)

Live Live Live Tokyo Dome 1993–1996 is a live album released by X Japan on October 15, 1997. As the title states, it contains songs recorded at the Tokyo Dome between 1993 and 1996, all of them at the band's annual New Year's Eve concerts at that stadium. The album reached number 3 on the Oricon chart. A supplemental disc, titled Live Live Live Extra was released the following month.

== Track listing ==
Disc one

1. "Prologue" (1993.12.31)
2. "Blue Blood" (1993.12.31)
3. "Sadistic Desire" (1993.12.31)
4. "Week End" (1995.12.31)
5. "Rose of Pain" Acoustic (1994.12.31)
6. "Tears" Acoustic (1995.12.30)
7. "Standing Sex" (1993.12.31)
8. "Count Down ~ X" (1993.12.31)
9. "Endless Rain" (1993.12.31)

Disc two

1. "Amethyst" (1996.12.31)
2. "Rusty Nail" (1996.12.31)
3. "Dahlia" (1996.12.31)
4. "Crucify My Love" (1996.12.31)
5. "Scars" (1996.12.31)
6. "White Poem I " (199612.31)
7. "Drain" (1996.12.31)
8. "Say Anything" Acoustic (1995.12.31)
9. "Tears" (1993.12.31)
10. "Forever Love" (1996.12.31)
