= On the Verge of Destruction 1992.1.7 Tokyo Dome Live (album) =

Live album by X Japan
- Released: January 1, 1995
- Recorded: Tokyo Dome, January 7, 1992
- Genre: Heavy metal, power metal, speed metal
- Length: 145:56
- Label: Polydor
- Producer: X Japan

X Japan live chronology
On the Verge of Destruction; 1992.1.7 Tokyo Dome Live (1995)	Live Live Live Tokyo Dome 1993–1996 (1997)

On the Verge of Destruction 1992.1.7 Tokyo Dome Live is a live album released by X Japan on January 1, 1995. It contains the band's performance at the Tokyo Dome on January 7, 1992, which was the last with Taiji Sawada on bass. It is their only live album to feature Sawada. The album reached number 3 on the Oricon chart. There is also a VHS version (later re-released on DVD) with the same name.

== Track listing ==
Disc one

1. "Prologue ~ World Anthem" (S.E)
2. "Silent Jealousy"
3. "Sadistic Desire"
4. "Desperate Angel"
5. "Standing Sex"
6. "Week End"
7. "Drum Solo"
8. "Hide no Heya" (HIDEの部屋)
9. "Voiceless Screaming"

Disc two

1. "Piano Solo ~ Swan Lake"
2. "Es Dur no Piano Sen" (Es Durのピアノ線)
3. "Unfinished"
4. "Celebration"
5. "Orgasm" (オルガスム)
6. "Kurenai" (紅)
7. "Joker"
8. "X"
9. "Endless Rain"
