= On the Verge of Destruction 1992.1.7 Tokyo Dome Live (video) =

On the Verge of Destruction 1992.1.7 Tokyo Dome Live Visual Shock Vol. 4

Video by X Japan
- Released: November 1, 1992 (VHS)/(LD); September 25, 2001 (DVD)
- Recorded: Tokyo Dome, January 7, 1992
- Genre: Heavy metal, speed metal, power metal
- Label: Ki/oon

X Japan video chronology
Say Anything ~X Ballad Collection~ Visual Shock Vol. 3.5 (1991)	On the Verge of Destruction; 1992.1.7 Tokyo Dome Live; Visual Shock Vol. 4 (1992)	X Clips (1995)

On the Verge of Destruction 1992.1.7 Tokyo Dome Live (also known as Visual Shock Vol. 4) is a live VHS/LD released by X Japan on November 1, 1992. It contains the band's performance at the Tokyo Dome on January 7, 1992, the last with Taiji Sawada on bass. The video was re-released on DVD on September 25, 2001, there is also a two-CD version of the same name.

== Track listing (DVD) ==
Disc one

1. "Prologue ~ World Anthem" (S.E)
2. "Silent Jealousy"
3. "Sadistic Desire"
4. "Desperate Angel"
5. "Standing Sex"
6. "Week End"
7. "Drum Solo"
8. "Guitar Solo ~ hide no Heya"
9. "Voiceless Screaming"
10. "Piano Solo ~ Swan Lake"
11. "Es Dur no Piano Sen"
12. "Unfinished"

Disc two

1. "Celebration"
2. "Orgasm"
3. "Kurenai"
4. "Joker"
5. "X"
6. "Endless Rain"
7. "Say Anything" (S.E)
8. "Endless Rain" (S.E)
