= Shiroi Yoru =

Video by X Japan
- Released: July 25, 2007
- Recorded: Tokyo Dome, December 31, 1994
- Genre: Heavy metal, speed metal, power metal
- Length: 202
- Label: Geneon

X Japan chronology
Aoi Yoru (2007)	Shiroi Yoru (2007)	Aoi Yoru Shiroi Yoru Complete Edition (2007)

Shiroi Yoru (literally "White Night") is an X Japan live DVD released on July 25, 2007. It contains the band's performance at the Tokyo Dome on December 31, 1994. A DVD containing the concert from the previous night (Aoi Yoru) was released on the same day, along with a limited edition, containing both concerts and additional material (see Aoi Yoru Shiroi Yoru Complete Edition).

Footage from this concert was used in the X Japan Virtual Shock 001 video game released for the Sega Saturn on October 20, 1995. The player takes the role of a fan disguised as a photographer backstage at the concert.

== Track listing ==
Disc one

1. "Amethyst (S.E.)"
2. "Rusty Nail"
3. "Week End"
4. "Dahlia"
5. "Scars on Melody"
6. "Standing Sex"
7. "Heath Solo"
8. "Yoshiki Drum Solo"
9. "hide no Heya with Pata"
10. "Say Anything featuring Toshi"
11. "Rose of Pain featuring Toshi, hide, Pata"

Disc two

1. "Yoshiki Piano Solo"
2. "Kurenai"
3. "Endless Rain"
4. "Joker"
5. "Orgasm"
6. "X (Countdown 1994–1995 Version)"
7. "Longing ~Togireta Melody~"
8. "Say Anything (S.E.)"
9. "Tears (S.E.)"
10. "Unfinished (S.E.)"
