= Aoi Yoru Shiroi Yoru Complete Edition =

Compilation album by X Japan
- Released: July 25, 2007
- Genres: Heavy metal, speed metal, power metal
- Label: Geneon

X Japan compilation chronology
Shiroi Yoru (2007)	Aoi Yoru Shiroi Yoru; Complete Edition (2007)	X Japan Returns 1993.12.30 (2008)

Aoi Yoru Shiroi Yoru Complete Edition (青い夜 白い夜 Complete Edition) is an X Japan box set released on July 25, 2007 as a limited edition. It collects the Aoi Yoru and Shiroi Yoru concert DVDs released separately on the same day, along with a DVD of an interview with Yoshiki and a CD version of the "Longing ~Togireta Melody~" demo tape (often mistaken as "Fumikireta Melody"), which was originally distributed at the concerts on December 30 and 31, 1994. It ranked number one in music DVD sales and number 14 in overall DVD sales the week it was released.

== DVDs ==
- Aoi Yoru (2 DVDs)
- Shiroi Yoru (2 DVDs)
- "Longing ~Togireta Melody~" (Demotape Version) (1 CD)
- Reminiscing with Yoshiki (1 DVD)
