= X Japan Returns 1993.12.30 =

Video by X Japan
- Released: February 29, 2008
- Recorded: Tokyo Dome, December 30, 1993
- Genre: Heavy metal, speed metal, power metal, symphonic metal
- Length: 200
- Label: Geneon

X Japan chronology
Aoi Yoru Shiroi Yoru Complete Edition (2007)	X Japan Returns 1993.12.30 (2008)	X Japan Returns 1993.12.31 (2008)

X Japan Returns 1993.12.30 is an X Japan live DVD, released on February 29, 2008. It contains the band's performance at the Tokyo Dome on December 30, 1993. A DVD containing the concert from the following night (X Japan Returns 1993.12.31) was released on the same day, along with a limited edition containing both concerts and additional material (see X Japan Returns Complete Edition).

== Track listing ==
Disc one

1. "Prologue (~ World Anthem) (S.E.)"
2. "Silent Jealousy"
3. "Sadistic Desire"
4. "Standing Sex"
5. "Week End"
6. "Heath Solo"
7. "Yoshiki Drum Solo"
8. "hide no Heya"

Disc two

1. "Yoshiki Piano Solo"
2. "Art of Life"
3. "Celebration"
4. "Orgasm"

Disc three

1. "Tears"
2. "Kurenai"
3. "X"
4. "Endless Rain"
5. "Say Anything (S.E.)"
