= X Japan Returns 1993.12.31 =

Video by X Japan
- Released: February 29, 2008
- Recorded: Tokyo Dome, December 31, 1993
- Genre: Heavy metal, speed metal, power metal, symphonic metal
- Length: 180
- Label: Geneon

X Japan chronology
X Japan Returns 1993.12.30 (2008)	X Japan Returns 1993.12.31 (2008)	X Japan Returns Complete Edition (2008)

X Japan Returns 1993.12.31 is an X Japan live DVD, released on February 29, 2008. It contains the band's performance at the Tokyo Dome on December 31, 1993. A DVD containing the concert from the previous night (X Japan Returns 1993.12.30) was released on the same day, along with a limited edition containing both concerts and additional material (see X Japan Returns Complete Edition). This performance of "Art of Life" was previously released on the Art of Life 1993.12.31 Tokyo Dome DVD.

== Track listing ==
Disc one

1. "Prologue (~ World Anthem) (S.E.)"
2. "Blue Blood"
3. "Sadistic Desire"
4. "Standing Sex"
5. "Week End"
6. "Heath Solo"
7. "Yoshiki Drum Solo"
8. "hide no Heya"

Disc two

1. "Yoshiki Piano Solo"
2. "Art of Life"
3. "Joker"
4. "Orgasm"

Disc three

1. "Tears"
2. "X" (Countdown 1993–1994 Version)
3. "Endless Rain"
4. "Say Anything (S.E.)"
