= Hide discography =

hide discography
- Studio albums: 3
- Live albums: 3
- Compilation albums: 9
- Tribute albums: 8
- Singles: 13
- Video albums: 21

The following is the discography of hide, a Japanese rock musician who first gained fame in the late 1980s as lead guitarist of the heavy metal band X Japan before starting his solo career in 1993. Prior to X Japan, hide was leader and guitarist of the heavy metal band Saber Tiger (later known as Saver Tiger), who released one self-titled EP in July 1985 and contributed to two omnibuses before ending activities. Although two compilation albums of demos and live recordings and one concert VHS would later be released in 2001, with the band credited as Yokosuka Saver Tiger.

hide made his solo debut in August 1993 on MCA Victor with the simultaneously released singles "Eyes Love You" and "50% & 50%", which were both certified gold by the Recording Industry Association of Japan (RIAJ). Although the lyrics to these two songs were written by Yukinojo Mori, all of his subsequent material was written and composed by hide himself. His first studio album, Hide Your Face, was released in early 1994, reached number nine on the Oricon chart, and was certified double platinum by the RIAJ. All vocals and guitars were performed by hide, while bass and drums were contributed by various musicians such as T. M. Stevens and Terry Bozzio.

In September 1996, hide released his second studio album, Psyence, which debuted at number one on the Oricon and was also certified double platinum by the RIAJ. It features many fewer musicians than his previous album, as hide began to also contribute almost all bass parts. With the January 1998 single "Rocket Dive", his first on Universal Victor, his solo work started being released under the moniker hide with Spread Beaver, crediting his live touring band. However, with the exception of programmer, recording engineer and co-producer I.N.A and drummer Joe, the Spread Beaver members' contributions to recorded material was limited.

hide died on May 2, 1998, of what was ruled a suicide by hanging. Eleven days later, the single "Pink Spider" was released, debuted at number one and became his first release to be certified million by the RIAJ. Later that same month, it was succeeded as number one on the Oricon by its followup, "Ever Free", which was certified double platinum. 3.2.1., the debut studio album by Zilch, a United States–based band which formed in 1996 and was fronted by hide, was released in July 1998 by Cutting Edge. It reached number 2 on the Oricon and was certified double platinum by the RIAJ. The only studio album credited to hide with Spread Beaver, Ja, Zoo, was incomplete at the time of hide's death. It was completed by I.N.A and the other members of Spread Beaver, released in November 1998, reached number two and has been certified triple platinum for sales over 1.2 million.

In the years since hide's death, numerous re-releases, compilations and previously unreleased material has been published posthumously, including the 2002 single "In Motion" and the 2014 song "Co Gal". Both of these were demos or unfinished songs that were completed by I.N.A, with the later utilizing Vocaloid technology to mimic hide's voice. hide's solo recordings have sold over 6.6 million copies.

== Studio albums ==
Year	Data	Oricon ranking	Sales	RIAJ certifications
1994	Hide Your Face: Released: February 23, 1994; Label: MCA Victor	1	500,000+	Double Platinum
1996	Psyence: Released: September 2, 1996; Label: MCA Victor	1	500,000+	Double Platinum
1998	Ja, Zoo: Released: November 21, 1998; Label: Universal Victor	2	1,200,000+	Triple Platinum

== Live albums ==
Year	Data	Oricon ranking
2008	Psyence a Go Go: Released: March 19, 2008; Label: Universal Music Group	18
2008	Hide Our Psychommunity: Released: April 23, 2008; Label: Universal Music Group	25
2022	hide with Spread Beaver Appear!! "1998 Tribal Ja,Zoo" (Live) 2022 Mix: Released: July 6, 2022; Label: Universal Music Group	–

== Compilation albums ==
Year	Data	Oricon ranking	Sales	RIAJ certifications
2000	Best ~Psychommunity~: Released: March 2, 2000; Label: Universal Victor	1	800,000+	Double Platinum
2002	Singles ~ Junk Story: Released: July 24, 2002; Label: Universal Music Group	3	100,000+	Gold
2004	King of Psyborg Rock Star: Released: April 28, 2004; Label: Universal Music Group	7	–	–
2005	Perfect Single Box: Released: September 21, 2005; Label: Universal Music Group; 13 singles and a DVD	–	–	–
2008	Singles + Psyborg Rock iTunes Special!!: Released: February 6, 2008; digital download	–	–	–
2009	We Love hide ~The Best in The World~: Released: April 29, 2009; Label: Universal Music Group	7	–	–
2011	"Musical Number" -Rock Musical Pink Spider- "Musical Number"～ROCKミュージカル ピンクスパイダー～: Released: March 2, 2011; Label: Universal Music Group	100	–	–
2014	Co Gal 子 ギャル: Released: December 10, 2014; Label: Universal Music Group	2	–	–
2018	hide 1998 ~Last Words~: Released: May 2, 2018; Label: –; 5 CDs, 2 books and a DVD	–	–	–
2026	REPSYCLE+: Released: July 1, 2026; Label: Universal Music Group	–	–	–

== Tribute and remix albums ==
Year	Data	Oricon ranking
1997	Tune-Up: hide Remixes: Released: June 21, 1997; Label: MCA Victor	21
1999	Tribute Spirits: Released: May 1, 1999; Label: Pony Canyon; Sales: 783,760	1
2002	Psy-Clone: hide Electronic Remixes: Released: May 22, 2002; Label: Polydor	14
2013	Tribute II: Visual Spirits: Released: July 3, 2013; Label: Tokuma Japan Communications	33
2013	Tribute III: Visual Spirits: Released: July 3, 2013; Label: Tokuma Japan Communications	40
2013	Tribute IV: Classical Spirits: Released: August 28, 2013; Label: Tokuma Japan Communications	141
2013	Tribute V: Psyborg Rock Spirits: Club Psyence Mix: Released: August 28, 2013; Label: Tokuma Japan Communications	69
2013	Tribute VI: Female Spirits: Released: December 18, 2013; Label: Tokuma Japan Communications	113
2013	Tribute VII: Rock Spirits: Released: December 18, 2013; Label: Tokuma Japan Communications	32
2018	Tribute Impulse: Released: June 6, 2018; Label: Universal J	12

== Singles ==
Year	Data	Oricon ranking	Sales	RIAJ certifications
1993	"Eyes Love You": Released: August 5, 1993; Label: MCA Victor	3	200,000+	Gold
1993	"50% & 50%": Released: August 5, 1993; Label: MCA Victor	6	200,000+	Gold
1994	"Dice": Released: January 21, 1994; Label: MCA Victor	6	250,000+	Platinum
1994	"Tell Me": Released: March 24, 1994; Label: MCA Victor	4	500,000+	Double Platinum
1996	"Misery": Released: June 24, 1996; Label: MCA Victor	3	200,000+	Gold
1996	"Beauty & Stupid": Released: August 12, 1996; Label: MCA Victor	4	200,000+	Gold
1996	"Hi-Ho/Good Bye": Released: December 18, 1996; Label: MCA Victor	8	100,000+	Gold
1998	"Rocket Dive": Released: January 28, 1998; Label: Universal Victor	4	500,000+	Double Platinum
1998	"Pink Spider" ピンク スパイダー: Released: May 13, 1998; Label: Universal Victor	1	1,000,000+	Million
1998	"Ever Free": Released: May 27, 1998; Label: Universal Victor	1	800,000+	Double Platinum
1998	"Hurry Go Round": Released: October 21, 1998; Label: Universal Victor	2	500,000+	Double Platinum
2000	"Tell Me": Released: January 19, 2000; Label: Universal Victor	2	200,000+	Gold
2002	"In Motion": Released: July 10, 2002; Label: Universal J	4	100,000+	Gold

== Videos ==
- Seth et Holth as Seth (September 29, 1993)
- A Souvenir (VHS: March 24, 1994, DVD: April 4, 2001, as A Souvenir + Tell Me)
- Film the Psychommunity Reel.1 (VHS: October 21, 1994, DVD: April 4, 2001, Blu-ray: September 28, 2016)
- Film the Psychommunity Reel.2 (VHS: November 23, 1994, DVD: April 4, 2001, Blu-ray: September 28, 2016)
- X'mas Present (December 24, 1994)
- Lemoned Collected By hide (May 22, 1996, also features Zeppet Store, Vinyl and Trees of Life)
- Ugly Pink Machine File 1 Official Data File [Psyence A Go Go In Tokyo] (VHS: February 26, 1997, DVD: October 18, 2000, Blu-ray: September 28, 2016)
- Ugly Pink Machine File 1 Unofficial Data File [Psyence A Go Go 1996] (VHS: March 26, 1997, DVD: October 18, 2000, Blu-ray: September 28, 2016)
- Seven Clips (VHS: June 21, 1997, DVD: October 18, 2000, as Seven Clips + Hurry Go Round)
- hide presents Mix Lemoned Jelly (VHS: August 21, 1997, DVD: July 20, 2003, features many other artists)
- Top Secret X'mas Present '97 (December 24, 1997)
- His Invincible Deluge Evidence (VHS: July 17, 1998, DVD: July 20, 2000)
- A Story 1998 hide Last Works (December 8, 1999) RIAJ certified Gold for sales of 100,000
- Alivest Perfect Stage ＜1,000,000 Cuts hide!hide!hide!＞ (December 13, 2000)
- Seventeen Clips ~Perfect Clips~ (May 3, 2001)
- hide with Spread Beaver Appear!! "1998 Tribal Ja, Zoo" (September 21, 2005)
- Alive! (DVD: December 3, 2008, Blu-ray: September 28, 2016)
- We Love hide ~The Clips~ (DVD: December 2, 2009, Blu-ray: September 28, 2016)
- hide 50th Anniversary Film: Junk Story (theatrical: May 23, 2015, DVD/Blu-ray: December 11, 2015)
- hide 3D Live Movie "Psyence a Go Go" ~20 Years from 1996~ (theatrical: October 25, 2016, DVD/Blu-ray: January 25, 2017)
- Hurry Go Round (theatrical: May 26, 2018, DVD/Blu-ray: December 5, 2018)

== Other discography ==
With X Japan

With Zilch

- 3.2.1. (July 23, 1998)
- Bastard Eyes (July 7, 1999)

With M*A*S*S

- Dance 2 Noise 004 (January 21, 1993, "Frozen Bug")

With Saver Tiger

- Saber Tiger (July 1985)
- Heavy Metal Force III (November 7, 1985, "Vampire")
- Devil Must Be Driven out with Devil (1986, "Dead Angle" and "Emergency Express")
- Origin of hide Vol. 1 (February 21, 2001, compilation album)
- Origin of hide Vol. 2 (February 21, 2001, compilation album)
- Origin of hide Vol. 3 (February 21, 2001, VHS)

=== Other work ===
- Overdoing (Tokyo Yankees, October 20, 1992, chorus)
- "Made in Heaven" (Toshi, October 21, 1992, guitar on "Made in Heaven")
- Flowers (Issay, September 21, 1994, guitar on "Itoshi no Max")
- 96/69 (Cornelius, June 9, 1996, remixed "Heavy Metal Thunder")
- Ultra Mix (Shonen Knife, October 22, 1997, remixed "Tower of the Sun")
- Fragile (D.I.E., April 1, 1998, guitar, theremin and guitar solo on "Fragile")
- "Jungle" (Taiji, July 15, 2000, guitar)
- Skyjin (Zilch, September 27, 2001, guitar on "Hide and Seek")
