= Co Gal =

- Cover of the regular edition.

Compilation album by hide
- Released: December 10, 2014
- Genre: Alternative rock
- Language: Japanese, English
- Label: Universal Music

"Co Gal" (Japanese: 子 ギャル, Hepburn: Ko Gyaru) is a compilation album by Japanese musician hide, released sixteen years after his death. The title track was originally demoed in 1998, and then finished utilizing Vocaloid technology to mimic the artist's voice. The album was released on December 10, 2014 by Universal Music. It reached number 2 on the weekly Oricon chart and was the 81st best-selling album for the year 2015.

== Background and completion ==
"Co Gal" was originally intended to be included on what became hide's last album, Ja, Zoo released posthumously in November 1998. However, the artist died on May 2 before completing it, leaving only a demo and written lyrics under the working titles of 子ギャル or 子GAL. These lyrics were displayed at the hide Museum in his hometown of Yokosuka from 2000 to 2005.

As the title suggests, the song satirizes the Japanese Kogal (コギャル) fashion trend that was popular in the 1990s. It was actually performed by hide's band Spread Beaver on the 1998 Tribal Ja, Zoo Tour, which the surviving members undertook using recordings. One such performance was included on 2005's hide with Spread Beaver Appear!! "1998 Tribal Ja, Zoo" DVD, with bassist Chirolyn providing the vocals.

In a process that took two years, Yamaha utilized their Vocaloid technology to mimic the deceased musician's voice and complete the song after receiving an offer by Universal Music Japan. His actual voice, breathing sounds and other cues were extracted from previously released songs and the demo (which features alternate lyrics) and combined with the synthesized voice. hide's friend and Spread Beaver bandmate INA then made further alterations. Kenji Arakawa, a spokesman for Yamaha, said he believes this to be the first time a work by a deceased artist is commercially available and includes the dead person singing lyrics completed after their death.

== Release ==
"Co Gal" was released on December 10, 2014 by Universal in celebration of what would have been hide's 50th birthday. It was coupled with fifteen of his most popular songs, which were remastered and listed as "bonus tracks". The limited edition with a different cover also features hide's original demo of the song and a DVD of music videos and three television performances from the show Pop Jam. A music video for "Co Gal" created using unreleased footage of recording sessions in Los Angeles combined with previously seen material is also included. An Ultimate High Quality CD version of the album was given a limited release on December 9, 2015.

== Track listing ==
No.	Title	Length
1.	"Co Gal" (子 ギャル)	3:12
2.	"Junk Story"	5:47
3.	"In Motion"	4:56
4.	"Tell Me" (2000 version)	4:57
5.	"Hurry Go Round"	5:02
6.	"Ever Free"	3:42
7.	"Pink Spider" (ピンク スパイダー)	3:44
8.	"Rocket Dive"	3:43
9.	"Good Bye"	3:59
10.	"Hi-Ho"	5:46
11.	"Beauty & Stupid"	4:08
12.	"Misery"	5:02
13.	"Tell Me" (1994 version)	4:45
14.	"Dice"	3:05
15.	"50% & 50%"	4:43
16.	"Eyes Love You"	5:58
17.	"Co Gal (Demo)" (子 ギャル (demo), extra track on the limited edition)	3:11

Limited edition DVD
No.	Title	Length
1.	"Co Gal" (子 ギャル)
2.	"Junk Story"
3.	"In Motion"
4.	"Tell Me" (2000 version)
5.	"Hurry Go Round"
6.	"Ever Free"
7.	"Pink Spider" (ピンク スパイダー)
8.	"Rocket Dive"
9.	"Good Bye"
10.	"Hi-Ho"
11.	"Beauty & Stupid"
12.	"Misery"
13.	"Tell Me" (1994 version)
14.	"Dice"
15.	"Eyes Love You"
16.	"Beauty & Stupid" (Pop Jam 1996.9.7)
17.	"Hi-Ho" (Pop Jam 1997.2.8)
18.	"Rocket Dive" (Pop Jam 1998.2.7)
