= Pata (musician) =

Japanese musician (born 1965)

Pata 石塚 智昭
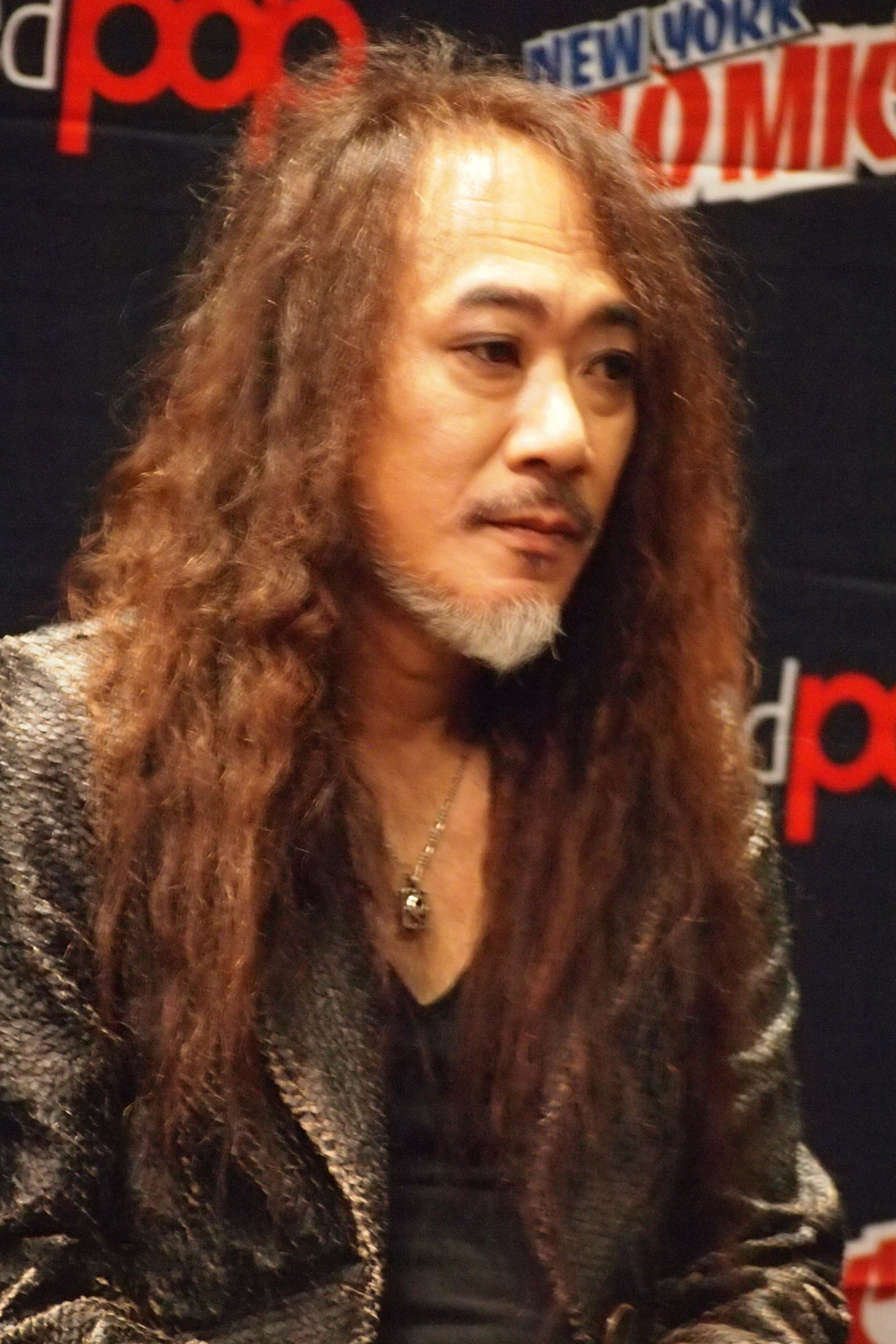
- Pata in New York, 2014

Background information
- Born: Tomoaki Ishizuka; November 4, 1965 (age 61); Chiba, Japan
- Genres: Rock; heavy metal; blues rock
- Occupations: Musician; composer
- Instrument: Guitar
- Years active: 1980–present
- Label: BMG Victor
- Member of: X Japan; Ra:IN
- Website: pata-official.com

Japanese name
- Kanji: 石塚 智昭
- Hiragana: いしづか ともあき
Transcriptions
- Romanization: Ishizuka Tomoaki

Tomoaki Ishizuka (Japanese: 石塚 智昭, Hepburn: Ishizuka Tomoaki; born November 4, 1965), known exclusively by his stage name Pata, is a Japanese musician. He is best known as rhythm guitarist of the visual kei rock band X Japan. He joined the band in 1987, stayed with them until their dissolution in 1997, and rejoined when the band reunited in 2007.

Pata began a solo career in 1993, releasing two studio albums featuring Western musicians such as Tommy Aldridge, Tim Bogert, James Christian and Chuck Wright. When X Japan disbanded, he formed the short-lived duo P.A.F. in 1998 with former Make-Up singer NoB and the rock band Dope HEADz in 2000 with X Japan bassist Heath and former Spread Beaver programmer I.N.A. Both projects released two studio albums before ceasing activity. Pata then formed the instrumental band Ra:IN in 2002, which still tours extensively to this day. In 2018, readers and professional musicians voted Pata the ninth best guitarist in the history of hard rock and heavy metal in We Rock magazine's "Metal General Election".

== Early life ==
Tomoaki Ishizuka was born on November 4, 1965, in the town of Matsunami, Chiba, Japan. His father was an elementary school teacher and later principal, his mother was a housewife, and he has a younger sister two years his junior. Due to the influence of his father, Pata came to love baseball and often played it with friends in the neighborhood park. Although he claims to have had no artistic ability, he attended art classes for about two years because his sister wanted to. There, he was friends with Katsuhide Uekusa. In junior high school, Pata was a member of the tennis club. However, after his father died from cancer in the middle of his second year, he rarely attended school. When he did, he would only go half the day in order to avoid the classes he hated.

Instead, Pata spent his time playing an acoustic guitar that his parents had bought his sister. He had previously watched Kiss' 1977 Nippon Budokan concert on the NHK television show Young Music Club, and it made a big impact on him. Although he and members of his family owned albums by other Western acts, such as Rock 'n' Roll Music by The Beatles which was the first album he ever bought, Pata was not allowed to play Kiss too loud. At the time, rock music was thought to be a bad influence on children and his parents threw away a magazine that he had bought because Kiss was on the cover. Cheap Trick is the Western rock band that had the biggest influence on Pata, with him citing them as the reason he started playing guitar and the intro to "Dream Police" as the first thing he learned. The first electric guitar he owned was a cheap Explorer replica, the same style and paint job as Cheap Trick's Rick Nielsen, that his parents bought him in his second year of junior high from a mail-order magazine advertisement. (Note: He previously stated that his first electric guitar was his Tokai Stratocaster, but has since realized he was mistaken.)

Because of his poor grades due to truancy, Pata was told he only had two options for high school; one near his home and one in Kisarazu, an hour away. He chose the latter because it had a good baseball team; although he never played for the school. However, he was frequently absent due to asthma, attending less than a single semester, and had to repeat his first year. But he gradually stopped attending anyway.

== Career ==
=== 1979–1997: Early bands and X Japan ===
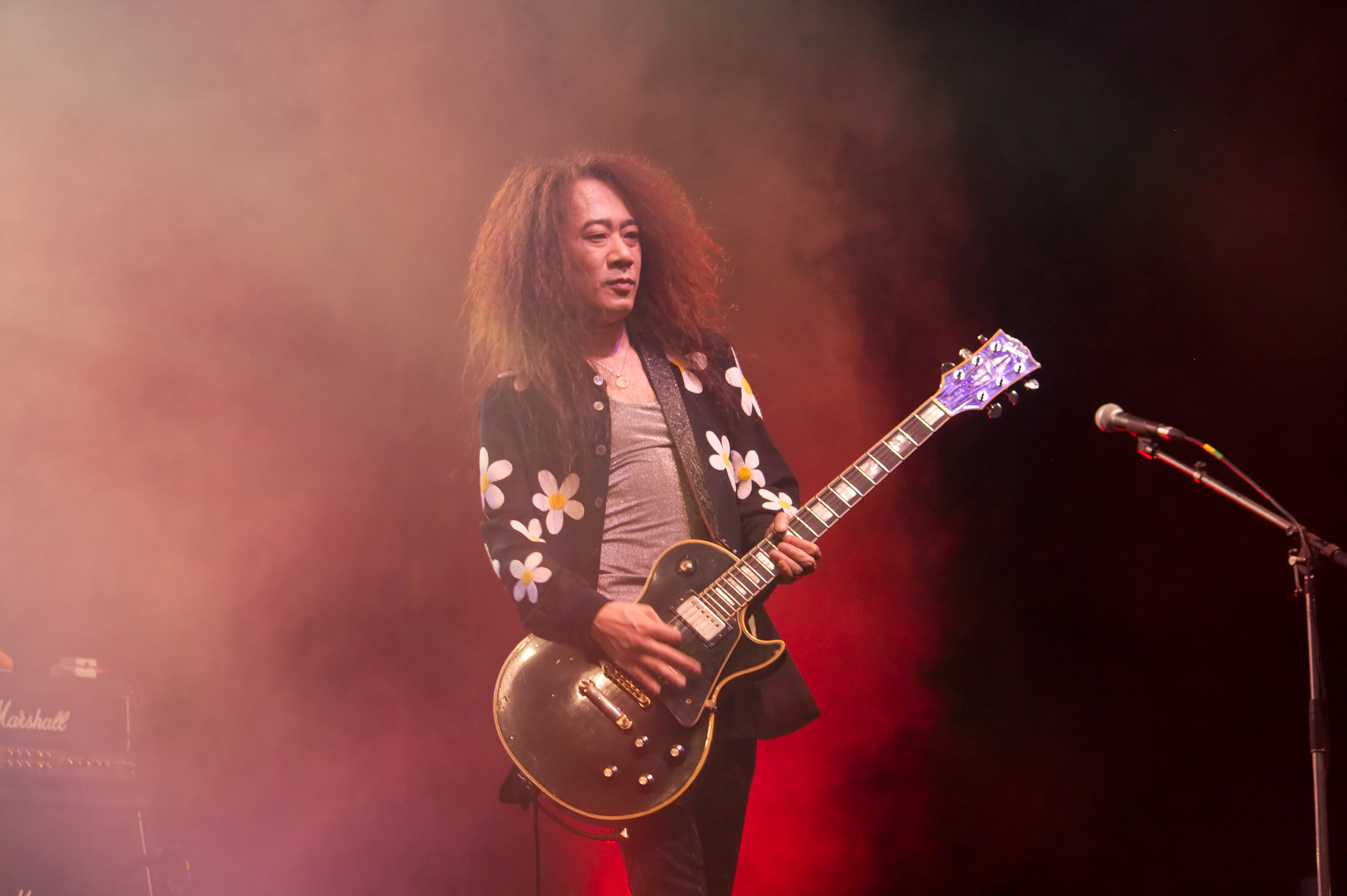
Pata performing at Japan Expo in 2008

Together with a former junior high classmate, Pata formed his first band in high school, Headlock, named after the wrestling move. They performed at the Yamaha-sponsored music contest East West, but fell apart as the members gradually stopped hanging out. He then formed a band with high school classmates that he met at a Sakae, Chiba musical instrument store that he frequented and later became a part-time employee at, and performed at the school festival during Pata's repeat of his first year. This was the predecessor of what became Black Rose, named after the Thin Lizzy song. Pata and the other guitarist were the composers of their five or six original songs. Pata was present at East West '83, where one of the bands competing was X. By the time he turned 20, Pata was in Judy, a band he formed with the vocalist of Black Rose. Whereas the previous group had a twin guitar setup, Pata was the only guitarist in Judy. And although he wrote some songs, the bassist was the main composer in the new band. When Judy found themselves without a drummer and a concert approaching, a mutual acquaintance asked X drummer Yoshiki if he would provide live support for them. In total, Pata estimates that Yoshiki filled in on drums three times for the band. He asked him to officially join, as at the time X was going through member changes, but Yoshiki declined. Unable to find a permanent drummer, Judy could not book performances and naturally disintegrated.

Around New Year's 1987, Pata received a phone call out of the blue from Yoshiki. X were about to record for an omnibus album, but had fired their guitarist. Wanting to repay his debt to Yoshiki and with no musical activities of his own, Pata agreed to help. He made his recording debut playing as a session musician on X's songs "Stab Me in the Back" and "No Connexion" for the 1987 omnibus album Skull Thrash Zone Volume I. The record also saw his occasional nickname, "Pata", become his stage name. It was coined after someone at the music shop he worked at had told him his personality resembled that of the title character of the manga series Patalliro!. A short time later, he received another call from Yoshiki, stating that while they had hired Hide, they needed a second guitarist for concerts. After supporting them at one or two live shows, Pata officially joined X. According to a 1989 issue of Rockin'f magazine, Pata officially joined after his predecessor Isao was involved in a traffic accident. Yoko of United said that Pata was previously a roadie for brief X member Hally and used Hally's guitar when he joined X himself.

X released their first album Vanishing Vision in April 1988 and toured extensively in support of the record. They became one of the first Japanese acts to achieve mainstream success while on an independent label. X are also widely credited as one of the pioneers of visual kei, a movement among Japanese musicians comparable to Western glam. Describing his own visual aesthetics, Pata said he had Nori from Tokyo Yankees, who was a roadie for X and had briefly attended a barber school, dye his red since every other member of the band had blond hair. Pata also shaved one side of his head because he liked punk rock. This later became a mohawk when X made their major label debut. When he first joined the band, Pata would borrow a leather jacket that Hide had worn in his previous band, but eventually switched to a longer one after seeing Steve Stevens in the music video for "Rebel Yell". Because it was rather plain, Taiji took it home and painted a punk-like image on it.

Their major label debut album, Blue Blood, was released in April 1989 and debuted at number six on the Oricon chart. Its success earned the band the "Grand Prix New Artist of the Year" award at the 4th annual Japan Gold Disc Awards in 1990. Their third album Jealousy was released in 1991 and debuted at number one, selling over 600,000 copies. It was later certified million by the RIAJ. On August 24, 1992, at a press conference in New York City at Rockefeller Center, the band introduced their new bassist Heath and announced that they were changing their name from "X" to "X Japan". Shortly after the release of August 1993's Art of Life, which also topped the Oricon, the members took a break to start solo projects. Dahlia, which would become the band's last album, was released in November 1996, and once again, it reached the number one spot. In September 1997, it was announced that X Japan would disband. They performed their farewell show, aptly titled The Last Live, at the Tokyo Dome on December 31, 1997.

=== 1993–2007: Solo career, Dope HEADz and Ra:IN ===
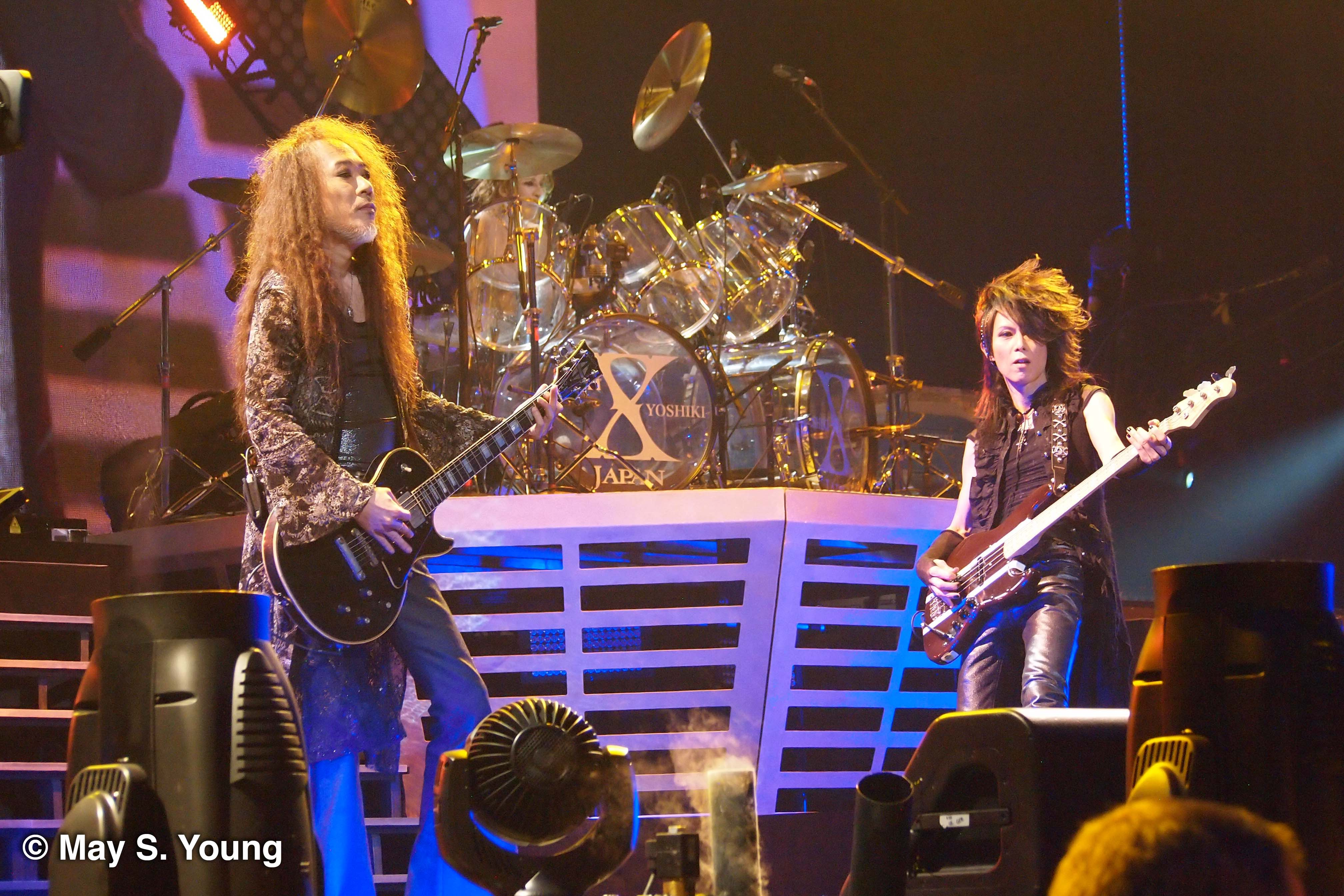
Pata formed the band Dope HEADz with Heath in 2000. (Both pictured with X Japan in 2014.)

On November 4, 1993, Pata released his first self-titled solo album. He never thought about creating one before, but the other members of X Japan were doing it, so he agreed when the record company made an offer. He contacted his friend Stan Katayama, a Japanese recording engineer living in Los Angeles that he met while recording Jealousy, who recruited Western musicians to play on the album. First was Tommy Aldridge, who agreed as long as it was not pop music, followed by drummer Simon Phillips and bassist Tim Bogert, whose work with Jeff Beck and Beck, Bogert & Appice, respectively, Pata liked. Although Pata initially assumed the album would be instrumental, he had trouble composing only instrumentals and Katayama introduced him to House of Lords vocalist James Christian. Aldridge, Bogert and Christian toured Japan with Pata in November to support the album.

In March of 1994, Pata began supporting his fellow X Japan guitarist Hide on his Hide Our Psychommunity solo tour. Hide had asked Blizard guitarist Ran to be in his live band, but Ran would only agree if Pata did so as well. Pata's single "Shine on Me", released on January 21, 1995, features Hiroyuki Shibata on vocals. His second solo album, Raised on Rock, was released on July 5, 1995 and again featured Christian and Daisuke Hinata, as well as Chuck Wright and Ken Mary. However, he was unable to tour in support of it due to his work with X Japan. In 1996, Pata once again supported Hide at his solo concerts, this time on the Psyence a Go Go tour. When X Japan broke up, Pata formed P.A.F. with former Make-Up frontman NoB in 1998. Planning to work as a solo artist, Pata initially only had NoB help by writing lyrics and providing temporary vocals for demos. Then while recording and wondering who should sing, the guitarist realized he should just ask Nob to be an official member. The duo is named after P.A.F. guitar pickups. In about one year's time they released two studio albums, one mini-album, one live album and two singles.

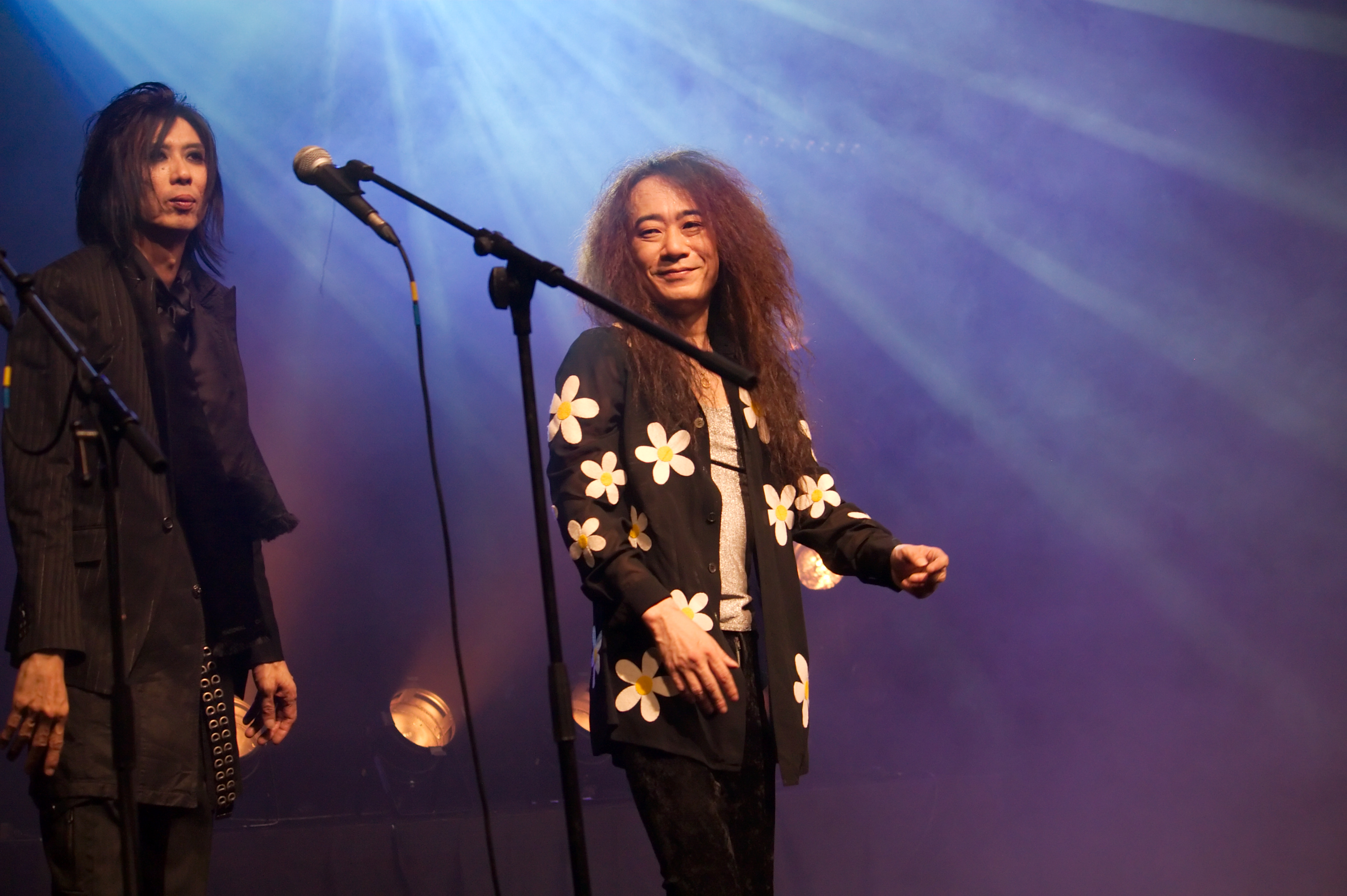
Pata with his Ra:IN bandmate Michiaki in 2008

For the 1999 Hide tribute album Tribute Spirits, Pata teamed up with X Japan bassist Heath and former Spread Beaver percussionist and programmer I.N.A. to cover X's song "Celebration". This was the catalyst for Dope HEADz, the band the three formed the following year. I.N.A. later suggested that Heath had wanted to form a band with him because they both liked 1990s industrial music, such as Nine Inch Nails. When Pata was suggested as the guitarist, he decided to give it a try, but said he would quit if he did not like it. Vocalist Jo:Ya auditioned twice before earning the role of frontman in September 2000. Dope HEADz made their live debut at a New Year's Eve countdown event at Cafe Le Psyence in Yokosuka on December 31, 2000. In 2001, they released two singles, "Glow" in February and "True Lies" in April, followed by their first studio album, Primitive Impulse, in June. The drums for tracks recorded in Los Angeles were provided by Joey Castillo, while the drums for songs recorded in Japan were provided by Ryuichi "Ryu" Nishida, who also toured with the band. The singles both peaked at number 35 on the singles chart, while the album reached number 20 on its respective chart. However, Jo:Ya left the band after a September 9, 2001, concert at Zepp Tokyo. Dope HEADz recruited Ravecraft vocalist Shame as their new frontman and released the album Planet of Dope in July 2002. In March 2003, they announced they were entering a hiatus.

In 2002, Pata formed the instrumental rock band Ra:IN with bassist Michiaki and drummer Tetsu, the latter of whom previously played on P.A.F.'s second album. According to the guitarist, the only things they decide on in advance are a song's title, intro and ending, everything else is improvised. After their first show in October or November 2002, Ra:IN went on their first tour in December, with their debut maxi-single "The Border" released in April 2003. Their first album, The Line, followed that November. On October 19, 2003, Pata provided live support for Miyavi at Hibiya Open-Air Concert Hall, alongside Spread Beaver bassist Chirolyn, Seikima-II guitarist Luke Takamura and Luna Sea drummer Shinya. Ra:IN played their first shows outside Japan in 2004; events in Shanghai and Taiwan. A performance in Paris followed in May 2005. At Shibuya-AX on July 7, 2005, Pata performed in Nanase Aikawa's backing band with Shinya, former Spread Beaver member DIE, Dead End bassist Crazy Cool Joe and former Megadeth guitarist Marty Friedman. He also appears on three tracks from her November 2005 album R.U.O.K.?!, including the single "Everybody Goes". After playing with Ra:IN several times since 2005, DIE officially joined the band as keyboardist in 2007.

=== 2007–present: X Japan reunion ===
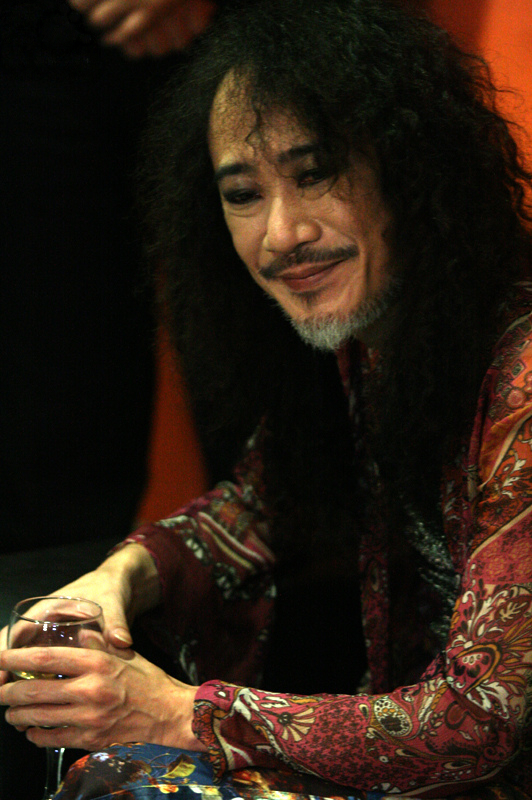
Pata in São Paulo, 2011

According to a report by the newspaper Sponichi, X Japan vocalist Toshi visited Yoshiki in Los Angeles in November 2006 to work on a song as a tribute to Hide. In March 2007, Toshi announced on his website that he and Yoshiki had recently resumed working together, stating that a "new project" would commence soon. In June, Yoshiki confirmed there were talks about reuniting X Japan and expressed interest in a tour and that he was in talks with Pata and Heath regarding their participation. According to Pata, Yoshiki contacted him at an unspecified time to play guitar on what would become the song "I.V.", and he agreed. At a dinner sometime later, Yoshiki told him and Heath that he wanted to release the song as X Japan, indicating that the band would be reuniting after 10 years. On October 22, 2007, X Japan officially announced their reunion and released "I.V." as the theme song to the American horror film Saw IV.

Pata appears in the 2008 film Attitude, directed by former Color frontman Dynamite Tommy. Ra:IN went on a lengthy European tour in 2009 that took them to France, Poland, Finland and Russia. In 2010, X Japan held their first North American tour from September 25 to October 10. Their first world tour began with four gigs in Europe from June 28 to July 4, 2011, and was resumed from September to October with five shows in South America and five in Asia.

On September 22, 2013, Pata appeared at a concert in memory of Hide, hosted by Sexxx George (Ladies Room), performing in a special band with George, Eby (ex-Zi:Kill), Yoshihiko (heidi.) and Cutt. For the Hide tribute album Tribute VII -Rock Spirits-, released on December 18, 2013, Pata reunited with Spread Beaver members Joe, I.N.A. and Chirolyn and Dope HEADz vocalist Shame to record a new version of "Pink Spider" under the name The Pink Spiders. Tetsu left Ra:IN in 2014, and was replaced on drums by Ryu that same year.

On January 15, 2016, Pata was rushed to the intensive care unit of a Tokyo hospital. He was diagnosed with colon diverticulitis and a severe blood clot in his portal vein, but in stable condition. In June, Yoshiki stated that Pata was discharged in March, but had to go back for surgery in August. Pata announced he was discharged on August 10. X Japan ended up postponing the release of their sixth studio album and March 12, 2016, concert at the Wembley Arena in London for a whole year; the latter was held on March 4, 2017, while the former remains unreleased.

Pata sat in with The Last Rockstars at their November 21, 2023 concert at Ariake Arena for a performance of X Japan's "Rusty Nail". Rittor Music published Pata's autobiography, Pata: Yopparai no Kaikoroku (PATA 酔っ払いの回顧録), on February 13, 2024. Following the October 2023 death of Heath, the "heath the live everliving everloving" event was held at Club Phase in Tokyo on October 27, 2024. There, Pata reunited with both Jo:Ya and Shame for a cover of their former Dope HEADz bandmate's solo song, "The Live". Due to the worsening of a leg injury that had been bothering him for the past few years, Pata appeared in a wheelchair and performed sitting down at Hide with Spread Beaver's May 2 and 3, 2025 concerts at the Tokyo Metropolitan Gymnasium. A week later, Ra:IN cancelled their tour that was set to begin in June when it was learned that he also had a spinal fracture. Pata made his return to the stage at Yokohama Bay Hall on August 11, performing with Ra:IN at the What is Jam? Vol. 10 event hosted by his X Japan bandmate Sugizo's band Shag.

== Equipment ==
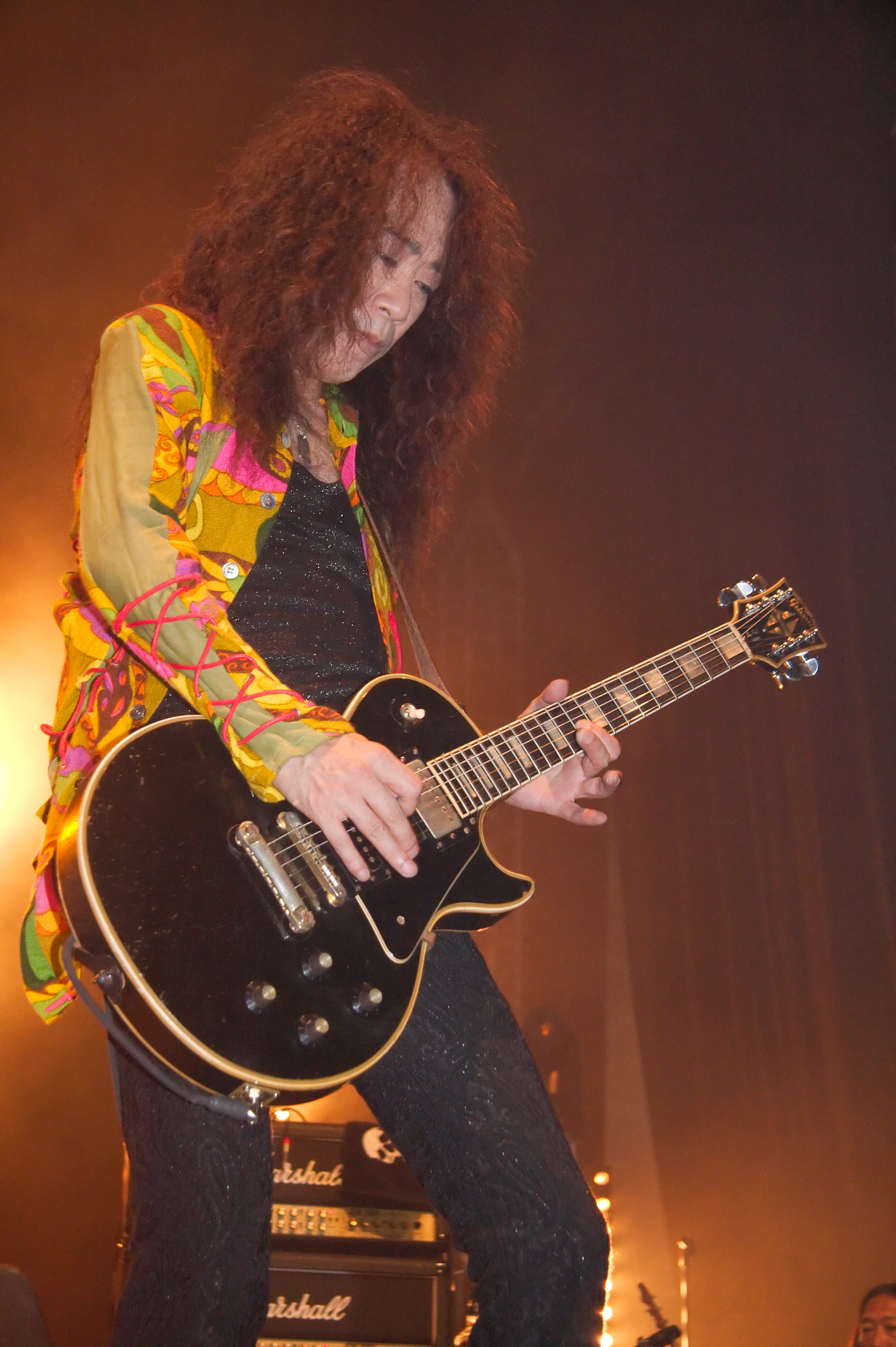
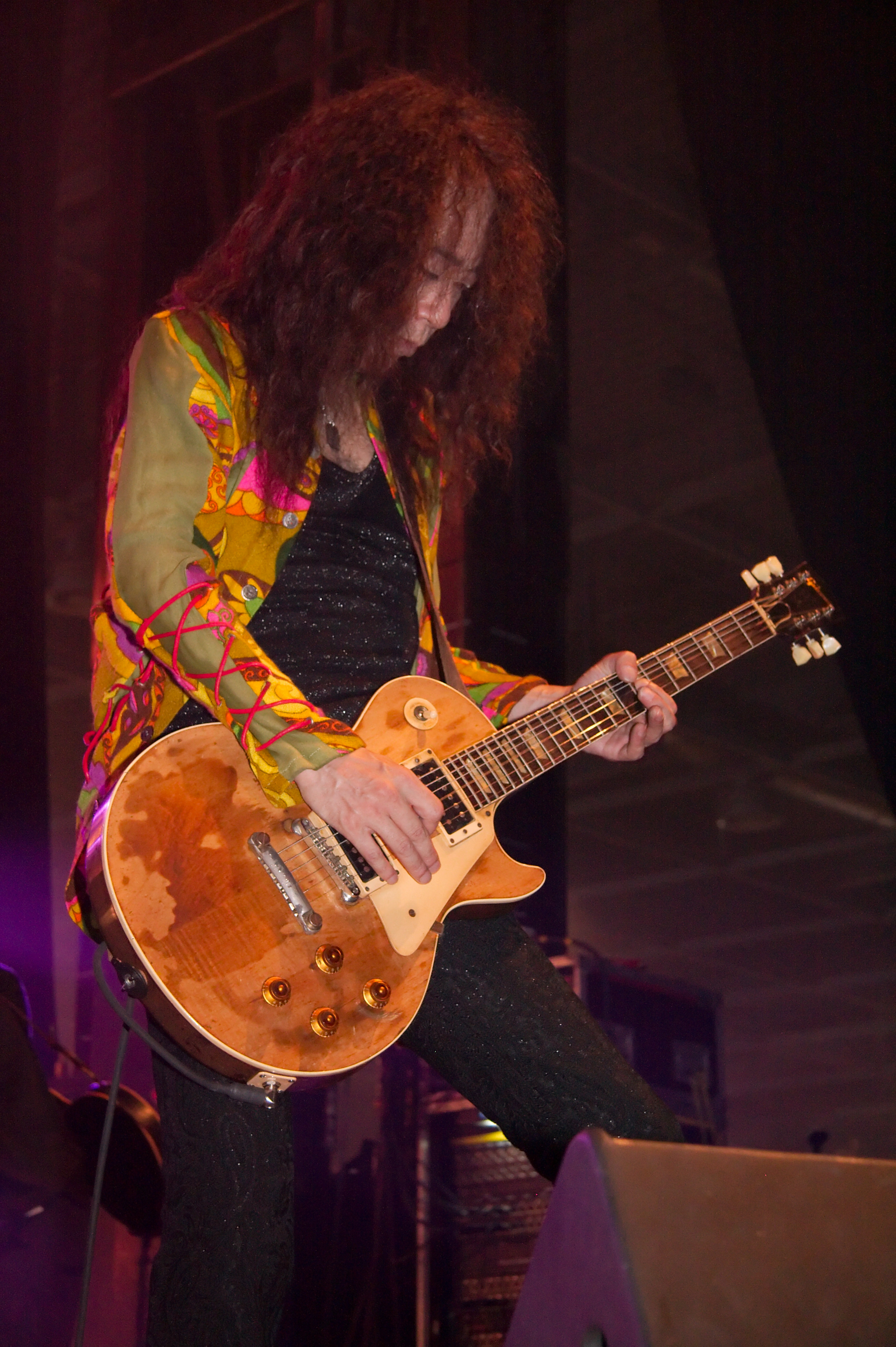
Pata playing "Jōmu" (left) and "Hage" in 2009

Pata is noted as the only member of X Japan who plays American-made instruments, almost always seen playing a vintage Gibson Les Paul. His favorite is a black Les Paul Custom that is estimated to be from around 1972. (Note: The 2022 Cross Bridge source calls it a 1975 model, but Pata himself estimates it from around 1972 in his 2024 autobiography.) Nicknamed "Jōmu" (常務; "Managing Director"), he has owned it since his amateur days. Its frets have been replaced many times, the bridge has been replaced several times, and the back of the neck was shaved down to be easier to play. The neck has also been broken and repaired twice, which has resulted in the serial number on its headstock being obscured when it was repainted. He also often uses a 1955 Goldtop Les Paul Standard, whose paint is rubbed down to the wood, earning it the nickname "Hage" (ハゲ; "Bald"). It originally belonged to a guitar tech, but after borrowing it, Pata traded a 1959 reissue for it. Its pickups and tailpiece were already altered when he acquired it, the former having been swapped out for humbuckers. Previously, Pata often used a yellow 1959 Standard nicknamed "Ichi-Gō" (1号; "Number 1"). (Note: While the 2022 Cross Bridge source states that another nickname for the yellow Standard is Pata's "Honsai" (本妻; "legal wife"), Pata himself refers to the black Custom as his "Tsuma" (妻; "wife") in his 2024 autobiography.) He bought it in Los Angeles just before recording X's album Jealousy (1991), which features the guitar extensively. Although he still uses it for recording, the 1959 has been retired from live performances since 2008 due to its value, which is reportedly enough to buy a house. Since X Japan's reunion, Pata occasionally uses a wine red 1976 Custom, which has a Tom Holmes 453 pickup in the rear. He also owns a white 2008 Custom that he often uses at home and calls "Panda", because the back of its headstock is painted black.

In addition to his lineup of Les Pauls, Pata owns several other guitars, such as a 1990s Gibson EDS-1275 double neck that has had all of its pickups changed, including the 12-string side to Burstbuckers, and its tailpiece changed to "Jimmy Page specifications". As of 2022, he had recently stopped using it live due to its heavy weight. He has a Burgudy Mist-colored 1964 Fender Stratocaster that he uses for recording, a Hamer GSTC-RN-59B that he bought because he admires Rick Nielsen of Cheap Trick, an Ampeg Dan Armstrong Lucite that he bought simply because of its appearance but also uses live, and a Danelectro 59 that is his hobby guitar and occasionally used live. Acoustic guitars Pata owns include a 1968 Martin D-28 that he bought while recording his solo album in Los Angeles, the Martin O-017 that inspired the X song "White Wind from Mr. Martin ~Pata's Nap~", the Takamine that he played the intro to "Hurry Go Round" on, a Guild F212, and two Ovations.

Pata still has his sister's Jagard Parlor Type that he learned to play guitar on. His first electric guitar was a sunburst Explorer replica that his parents bought him for around ¥10,000. He chose it because it was the same style and paint job that Nielsen used. When Pata moved houses, the guitar somehow ended up in a pile to be thrown away. Therefore, his mother had no reason to say no when a moving employee who knew Pata lived there asked her for it. In his Black Rose days, Pata used a Tokai Stratocaster replica. In 1979, he stripped the paint off, and spray painted it silver to match the one used by Ritchie Blackmore in Rainbow. In the mid-1990s, Pata received a signature model guitar by Burny based on the Explorer, the EX-85P or its higher-end EX-240P. Pata's own copy of the guitar is made of korina and has Tom Holmes pickups. Before X Japan's 2014 concert at Madison Square Garden, Burny presented Pata with the prototype of his former bandmate Hide's signature Kujira model.

Pata prefers to change guitars on stage as little as possible. He uses four or five with X Japan due to their different tunings, but only about two for Ra:IN; one for regular tuning and one for drop tuning. Pata previously used D'Addario 011-049 strings, but found it difficult to bend the top string. While recording Art of Life (1993) in America, he happened to buy La Bella HRS-010-048 strings at a local music shop and has used them ever since. Similarly, he bought a Dunlop 0.73mm nylon guitar pick at the same time, and has used them ever since. Although he sometimes uses a slightly stiffer one for acoustic guitar. Pata has been using a 100 watt Marshall Super Lead MK II since the recording of X's album Blue Blood (1989). When he saw it in the store, it was already bought by a man who had taken out a loan to pay for it, but Pata convinced them to cancel the loan. The original buyer already had it modified to have a master volume knob, which Pata finds useful. He uses two because the bass tends to get "muddy" when using distortion; the older amp on top is used for the main melody, while the bottom amp is used to correct the bass. During the songwriting camp for Blue Blood, the Hiwatt logo on his cabinet fell off, and Pata thought it would be funny to put a Marshall logo in its place. Pata uses minimal effects pedals. As of 2022, he had an MXR Phase 100 phaser, an MK.4.23 booster, a Free the Tone delay, and a Vox wah pedal. Toru Saito has been his guitar tech since X Japan's 1991 Violence in Jealousy Tour.

== Discography ==
Solo

- Pata (November 4, 1993), Oricon Peak Position: #11
- Pata's Bootleg at Nissin Power Station Shinjuku (April 21, 1994, VHS or LD)
- "Fly Away" (September 21, 1994) #35
- "Shine on Me" (January 21, 1995) #94
- Raised on Rock (July 5, 1995) #33
- Improvisation Guitar Style (August 20, 2007, DVD)

With P.A.F.

- "Love & Fake" (February 21, 1998)
- Patent Applied For (March 25, 1998)
- "Slapstick Life" (October 21, 1998)
- "The Big Time" (January 21, 1999)
- Pat.#0002 (February 24, 1999)
- Live (July 23, 1999)

With Dope HEADz

- "Glow" (February 21, 2001) #35
- "True Lies" (April 25, 2001) #35
- Primitive Impulse (June 6, 2001) #20
- Planet of the Dope (July 24, 2002) #59

With Ra:IN

With X Japan

=== Other work ===
- Sound Locomotive (Motoaki Furukawa, June 24, 1992, left guitar solo on "Fantastic Offroader")
- Overdoing (Tokyo Yankees, October 20, 1992, guest guitar on "Drugstore Cowboy")
- Fire, Water, Earth & Stone (Rumble Tribe, August 31, 1994, lead guitar on "Whipping Post")
- Char Tribute: Psyche-Delicious (Various artists, June 18, 1997, "You Keep Snowin'")
- Ja, Zoo (hide with Spread Beaver, November 21, 1998, guitar on "Fish Scratch Fever" and "Hurry Go Round")
- Tribute Spirits (Various artists, May 1, 1999, "Celebration")
- Force of Fifth (e.mu, June 28, 2000, producer)
- R.U.O.K.?! (Nanase Aikawa, November 19, 2005, guitar on "Foolish 555", "Rock Star's Steady" and "Everybody Goes")
- "In Motion" (hide, July 10, 2002, guitar)
- "Summertime Blues" (Maguma MC's, August 6, 2003, guitar and appears in the music video)
- 30–35 Vol. 1: Mō Ikkai, Band Yarouze! (Various artists, April 6, 2005, guitar on "Hechima Rider")
- 30–35 Vol. 4: Zoku Mō Ikkai, Band Yarouze! (Various artists, August 10, 2005, guitar on "Air Conditioner")
- Chronic Lay About (Juichi Morishige, November 23, 2005, guitar on "Hitori ni Shinaide")
- 7.7.7. (Nanase Aikawa, January 1, 2006, guitar)
- Blackout in the Galaxy (Show Wesugi, February 8, 2006, guitar and arrangement on "Poo Pee People", "(New Shit) Tough Luck" and "Tondechire (Remix)")
- Psyence a Go Go (hide, March 19, 2008, guitar)
- Hide Our Psychommunity (hide, April 23, 2008, guitar)
- Attitude (film, July 19, 2008, cameo appearance)
- Nariagari (Shaku) 2003.10.19 Hibiya Yagai Daiongakudo (Miyavi, May 22, 2009, guitar)
- Samurai Japan (Toshi, February 24, 2010)
- Tribute VII -Rock Spirits (Various artists, December 18, 2013, "Pink Spider")
- Junk Story (hide documentary film, May 23, 2015, as himself)
- Music Not Fade Away (Seizi Kimura, 2018, guitar on "Not Fade Away")
- "Red Swan" (Yoshiki feat. Hyde, October 3, 2018, guest guitar)
- Memento (DIE, February 17, 2024, guest guitar)
- Issay Gave Life to Flowers - A Tribute to Der Zibet - (Various artists, July 6, 2024, guitar solo on "Akari o Keshite")
- Glowing Ash Burns On (Various artists, July 2024, guitar solo on "Glowing Ash Burns On Ver. Ryū")
- Memento the Movie Reel 1 (DIE, September 6, 2025)
- Tsuioku to Reimei: Documentary Film from "Meguro Rockmaykan" (film, 2025, as himself)
