= Hi ho =

Hi ho may refer to:

- "Hi ho", refrain in novel Slapstick
- Hi Ho Crackers, snack cracker
- "Hi-Ho/Good Bye", single by Japanese musician hide
- Hi-Hoe or NOTS-EV-2 Caleb, expendable launch system
- "Hi-ho, Kermit the Frog here", a catchphrase of Muppet character Kermit the Frog

== See also ==
- "Heigh-Ho", song from Walt Disney's Snow White and the Seven Dwarfs
