= Pink Spider =

- Cover of the 2006 re-release.

Single by hide with Spread Beaver

from the album Ja, Zoo
- Released: May 13, 1998
- Recorded: Early 1998
- Genre: Alternative rock, hard rock
- Label: Universal Victor
- Songwriter: hide

Hide with Spread Beaver singles chronology
| "Rocket Dive" (1998) | "Pink Spider" (1998) | "Ever Free" (1998) |

Audio sample
- "Pink Spider": file; help

"Pink Spider" (Japanese: ピンク スパイダー, Hepburn: Pinku Supaidā) is the ninth single by Japanese musician hide, the second to bear the hide with Spread Beaver name, released on May 13, 1998, eleven days after his death. It debuted at number 1 on the Oricon Singles Chart and was the 11th best-selling single of the year, being certified Million by the RIAJ. It was also named "Song of the Year" at the 13th Japan Gold Disc Awards.

== Recording ==
According to recording engineer and Spread Beaver member Kazuhiko "I.N.A." Inada, he and hide wanted hide's singles to be different from each other, so they decided to follow "Rocket Dive", his first since X Japan disbanded and which I.N.A. described as a refreshing number with a sense of speed, with "Pink Spider". For the song, the duo layered live drums and machine sounds. I.N.A. cited this as what hide meant when he described his music as "cyborg rock". When another engineer told him it was impossible, I.N.A. created the section of "Pink Spider" where the audio cuts out for a second manually without the aid of a computer.

== Releases ==
Released on May 13, 1998, "Pink Spider" was the first release published after hide's death on May 2. A live version of "Pink Spider" was included on the 2000 re-recording of "Tell Me". It was recorded on November 18, 1998, during the Tribal Ja, Zoo tour that was undertaken by Spread Beaver using recordings of hide's vocals.

On November 22, 2006, the "Pink Spider" single was re-released. On December 8, 2010, it was re-released again as part of the third releases in "The Devolution Project", which was a release of hide's original eleven singles on picture disc vinyl.

== Music video ==
The song's music video was directed by Shūichi Tan, who previously directed the video for "Rocket Dive". It was filmed at the Hotel Alexandria as hide was recording in Los Angeles at the time and Tan was fond of David Fincher, whose 1995 film Seven was shot at the hotel. Behind the scenes footage from the "Pink Spider" video shoot would later be used in the music video for "Ever Free".

== Reception ==
"Pink Spider" debuted at number 1 on the Oricon Singles Chart with sales over 513,000 copies in its initial week of release. By the end of the year it sold 1,033,770 copies, becoming the 11th best-selling single of 1998 and was certified Million by the RIAJ. It was also named "Song of the Year" at the 13th Japan Gold Disc Awards. The song's music video won the International Viewer's Choice - Japan award at the 1998 MTV Video Music Awards, and was named the best of the year at the 1998 Space Shower Music Video Awards.

Music journalist Showgun Fuyu called "Pink Spider" the ultimate example of the musical concept of "catchy without being pop". He described it as a heavy rock song that utilizes down-tuning and a heavy intro riff, and incorporates elements of industrial rock and groove metal. As such, he wrote that without the catchiness of the "Pinku supaidā, ikitai nā" chorus, it never would have become a million-selling hit.

In 2011, a jukebox musical based on and featuring hide's music was created, it was named Pink Spider after the song. It ran from March 8 to the 27 at the Tokyo Globe Theater and was then brought to Fukuoka, Kobe, Nagoya, Niigata, Sendai, and Sapporo in April.

== Track listing ==
All songs written by hide.

| No. | Title | Length |
|---|---|---|
| 1. | "Pink Spider" | 3:42 |
| 2. | "Pink Spider (Voiceless Version)" | 3:54 |
| 3. | Untitled (hidden track) | 5:48 |

- The hidden untitled third track begins with 5 minutes and 27 seconds of silence, representing May 27, the date "Ever Free" was released, before a piece of that song is played.

== Personnel ==
- hide – vocals, guitar, bass, arranger, producer
- Joe – drums
- Eiki "Yana" Yanagita – drums
- Hide Fujiko – female voice
- Bill Kennedy – mixing engineer
- Doug Trantow – assistant engineer (Scream)
- Eric Westfall – recording engineer (Sunset Sound)
- Daiei Matsumoto – recording engineer (Hitokuchizaka-Studio)
- Kazuhiko Inada – recording engineer
- Hiroshi Nemoto – assistant engineer (Hitokuchizaka-Studio)
- Kevin Dean – assistant engineer (Sunset Sound)

Personnel per Ja, Zoo liner notes.

== Cover versions ==
The song was covered by Siam Shade and Cornelius on the 1999 hide tribute album Tribute Spirits.

Nu metal band Rize covered this song and released it as their single "Pink Spider" in 2006. Rize performed their version live at the hide memorial summit on May 3, 2008, and the following day X Japan covered it live with Sugizo and Shinya of Luna Sea.

It was also covered by heidi. on the compilation Crush! -90's V-Rock Best Hit Cover Songs-, which was released on January 26, 2011, and features current visual kei bands covering songs from bands that were important to the '90s visual kei movement.

defspiral covered it for their 2011 maxi-single "Reply -Tribute to hide-", which also included the band's interpretations of three other hide songs. hide had signed the members' previous band, Transtic Nerve, to his label Lemoned shortly before his death in 1998.

Flow was covered the song during their fanclub limited live 26ers NaNaNa Night in 2012. The band covered it again at the first day of their anime song rock festival, Flow The Festival on June 6, 2026, with Spread Beaver members INA and Kiyoshi.

Koda Kumi, one of the best-selling Japanese artists of all-time, included a cover on her 2013 album Color the Cover. Her recording of the song debuted on J-Wave on January 24. The music video is an adaptation of the manga series Buffalo Gonin Musume. Early in her career, Koda performed at the hide museum in 2002. Her version was included on the hide tribute album Tribute VI -Female Spirits-, which was released on December 18, 2013.

The track was covered by Sadie for the Tribute II -Visual Spirits- tribute album and by Kiryu for Tribute III -Visual Spirits-, both albums were released on July 3, 2013.

For Tribute VII -Rock Spirits-, released on December 18, 2013, Spread Beaver members Joe, INA and Chirolyn teamed up with Pata and Shame to record a new version of the song under the name The Pink Spiders.

Luna Sea covered "Pink Spider" at the first day of their rock festival, Lunatic Fest on June 27, 2015. Their guitarist Inoran later included a cover on his August 2015 solo album Beautiful Now.

Miyavi covered the song for the June 6, 2018 Tribute Impulse album.
