= The Kiddie =

Japanese visual kei rock band

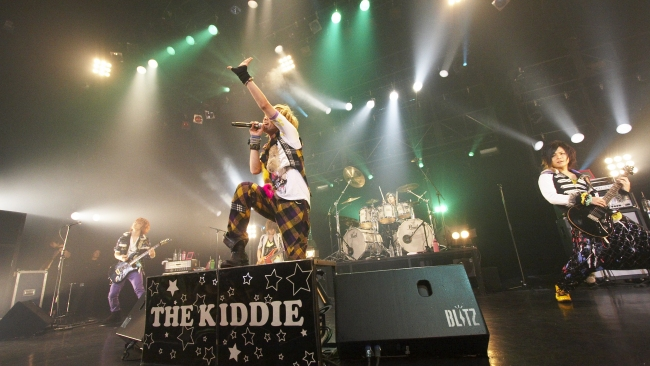

Background information
- Origin: Tokyo, Japan
- Genres: Pop rock
- Years active: 2007-2015
- Labels: King Records
- Past members: Yusa; Yuusei; Jun; Sorao; Yuudai
- Website: Official site

The Kiddie (stylized as THE KIDDIE) was a five-member visual kei rock band from Tokyo, Japan. The band was formed in May 2007 by vocalist Yusa (ex-Kazoku) and drummer Yuudai (ex-Kazoku).

== History ==
They held their first live performance on July 1, 2007 at Meguro Rockmaykan, and then debuted their first single "Little Senobi" on October 3, 2007. In 2010, The Kiddie signed with major label King Records and released their major debut single "Smile". on July 14. The Kiddie released their first album, Brave New World, on November 24, 2010. Their second album, MA★PIECE was released on March 28, 2012. Their third album, The 5 -FIVE- was released on November 28, 2012.

== Members ==
- Yusa (揺紗) - vocals
- Yuusei (佑聖) - lead guitar
- Jun (淳) - rhythm guitar
- Sorao (そらお) - bass
- Yuudai (ユウダイ) - drums

== Discography ==
=== Studio albums ===
- Single Collection (March 24, 2010)
- Brave New World (November 24, 2010)
- Ma★Piece (March 28, 2012)
- The 5 -Five- (November 28, 2012)
- Single Collection 2 (May 1, 2013)
- Dystopia (November 26, 2014)

=== Singles ===
- Little Senobi (October 3, 2007)
- Little Senobi (2nd press, January 23, 2008) - Oricon Single Chart Ranking No. 184
- Plastic Art (March 26, 2008) - Oricon Single Chart Ranking No. 133
- Sayonara Setsuna (サヨナラセツナ, A Goodbye Moment, October 1, 2008) - Oricon Single Chart Ranking No. 103
- Noah (April 15, 2009) - Oricon Single Chart Ranking No. 55
- Elite Star+ (July 8, 2009) - Oricon Single Chart Ranking No. 58
- Soar (October 7, 2009) - Oricon Single Chart Ranking No. 35
- Black Side (November 4, 2009) - Oricon Single Chart Ranking No. 42
- Poplar (ポプラ, December 2, 2009) - Oricon Single Chart Ranking No. 48
- Smile. (July 14, 2010) - Oricon Single Chart Ranking No. 19
- Calling (September 22, 2010) - Oricon Single Chart Ranking No. 34
- Nutty Nasty (May 25, 2011) - Oricon Single Chart Ranking No. 50
- Sun'z Up (August 13, 2011)
- Utsukushiki Redrum (美しきREDRUM, Beautiful Redrum, September 28, 2011) - Oricon Single Chart Ranking No. 21
- I Sing For You (August 1, 2012) - Oricon Single Chart Ranking No. 27
- emit. (February 2, 2014)
- 1414287356 (April 16, 2014)
- OMELAS (November 26, 2014)

=== DVDs ===
- The Kiddie Happy Spring Tour 2011: Kidd's Now (September 7, 2011)
- Wonder World (ワンダーワールド, August 4, 2013)

=== Others ===
- V-Rock Disney - V.A compilation album (Mary Poppins - "Supercalifragilisticexpialidocious", September 14, 2011)
- Tribute II -Visual Spirits- - V.A compilation album (hide - "Damage", July 3, 2013)
