= Ja, Zoo =

Studio album by hide with Spread Beaver
- Released: November 21, 1998
- Recorded: 1997–1998
- Studio: Sunset Sound Studio, Record Plant Studios, Ocean Way Studio, Los Angeles
- Genre: Alternative rock, industrial rock
- Length: 58:28
- Label: Universal Victor

Hide with Spread Beaver chronology
Psyence (1996)	Ja, Zoo (1998)

Singles from Ja, Zoo
- 1. "Rocket Dive" Released: January 28, 1998; 2. "Pink Spider" Released: May 13, 1998; 3. "Ever Free" Released: May 27, 1998; 4. "Hurry Go Round" Released: October 21, 1998

Ja, Zoo is the third album by Japanese musician hide, released on November 21, 1998. It is also his last studio album as he died on May 2 while recording it, and the only one released under the name hide with Spread Beaver.

It is his best-selling album, reaching number 2 on the Oricon Albums Chart and being certified Triple Platinum by the RIAJ for sales over 1.2 million. It was also named "Rock Album of the Year" at the 13th Japan Gold Disc Awards, while its single "Pink Spider" was named "Song of the Year".

== Overview ==
Ja, Zoo is the only full-length record to be released under the hide with Spread Beaver name; hide had retitled his solo project to formally include his live band. It was completed without him, due to his death on May 2, 1998.

Although all songs are credited to hide, his ultimate level of involvement in the finished product is not entirely clear. In June 1998, Zilch bassist Paul Raven said in an interview: "He was under a lot of pressure to finish his solo record. He had three songs completed the day before he died, and now mysteriously a full album is coming out nine days before ours." However, hide's brother and manager Hiroshi wrote in his 2010 book Brothers: Recollections of hide that at the time of his death hide had six out of ten songs finished for Ja, Zoo. This is supported by the fact that I.N.A is credited with additional arrangement on four songs. The album's release was eventually postponed until November 21, 1998, with Zilch's debut album 3.2.1. released on July 23, 1998, and including the song "Inside the Pervert Mound" which is an English version of "Leather Face".

Eric Westfall, one of the album's recording and mixing engineers, revealed that a week or so after hide's death, he and I.N.A had an emotionally difficult time finishing the album as televisions they had on in the studio were still showing footage of and talking about the dead musician. He said that I.N.A had a particularly difficult task with the vocals for "Hurry Go Round", which were not fully recorded and have a "heavy" or somber lyrical theme to them. Westfall went on to state that hide's work is the best material he has ever worked on. He also claimed that the liner notes crediting Rich Breen for mixing "Hurry Go Round" are incorrect and that the mix actually used was done by himself. Despite him being told that it would be, it was not corrected in later pressings.

== Outtakes ==
A song called "Co Gal" was originally demoed for Ja, Zoo but was not completed following hide's death. Sixteen years later, the song was finished and commercially released after Yamaha utilized their Vocaloid technology to mimic hide's voice. The song was later included in the 2024 REPSYCLE Version of the album as the 7th track.

Another song which is completely phantom entitled "ZOMBIE'S ROCK" was never demoed or recorded by Hide, but he had worked out the song already for a yet to be recorded demo version.

In 2026, a song called "TECHNO POP" which is a demo made in 1997, was found from I.N.A's archives. the demo track was later released as part of a new box set titled "REPSYCLE THE REPSYCLED" on July 1st, 2026.

== Reception ==
Upon its release, Ja, Zoo reached number 2 on the Oricon Albums Chart. When it was re-released on the Japan-only format SHM-CD on December 3, 2008, it only reached number 248.

By the end of 1998, Ja, Zoo sold 686,290 copies, becoming the 40th best-selling album of the year. It was certified Triple Platinum by the RIAJ in December 1998 for sales over 1.2 million. The album sold an additional 722,080 by the end of 1999, making it the 34th best-selling album of that year.

Ja, Zoo was one of the albums named "Rock Album of the Year" at the 13th Japan Gold Disc Awards and the single "Pink Spider" named "Song of the Year".

== Track listing ==
All tracks are written by hide.

Original 1998 Album
No.	Title	Length
1.	"Spread Beaver"	3:24
2.	"Rocket Dive"	3:41
3.	"Leather Face"	4:05
4.	"Pink Spider"	3:42
5.	"Doubt '97 (Mixed LEMONed Jelly Mix)"	3:53
6.	"Fish Scratch Fever"	3:46
7.	"Ever Free"	3:40
8.	"Breeding"	5:02
9.	"Hurry Go Round"	5:04
10.	"Pink Cloud Assembly"	21:43
Total length:		58:00

2024 REPSYCLE Version
No.	Title	Length
1.	"Spread Beaver"	3:25
2.	"Rocket Dive"	3:42
3.	"Leather Face"	4:05
4.	"Pink Spider" (REPSYCLE Ver.)	3:43
5.	"Doubt '97 (Mixed LEMONed Jelly Mix)"	3:53
6.	"Fish Scratch Fever"	3:46
7.	"Co Gal" (REPSYCLE Ver.)	3:12
8.	"Hurry Go Round" (REPSYCLE Ver.)	5:05
9.	"Breeding"	5:02
10.	"Ever Free"	3:40
11.	"Pink Cloud Assembly" (REPSYCLE Ver.)	2:23
Total length:		41:56

== Personnel ==
hide with Spread Beaver

- hide – vocals, guitar (except for track 9), surf guitar on track 1, bass (except for tracks 3, 5, 9), arranger, producer
- Chirolyn – bass on tracks 3, 9, chorus on track 6
- Joe – drums on tracks 2, 4, 6–10, drum loops on track 1, chorus on track 6
- Kiyoshi – lead guitar on track 1, electric guitar on track 9
- KAZ – backing guitar on tracks 1, 6, chorus on track 6
- D.I.E. – Hammond B3 organ on track 1, piano on track 10, chorus on track 6
- Kazuhiko "I.N.A" Inada – recording engineer, additional arrangement on tracks 1, 6, 9, 10, mixing engineer on track 5, chorus on track 6

Musicians and production

- Pata – backing guitar on track 6, acoustic guitar on track 9
- Eiki "Yana" Yanagita – drums on track 4
- Hide Fujiko – female voice on track 4
- Tetsu & friends – chorus on track 6
- Marron-B – tambourine on track 7
- Gotchin – acoustic guitar on track 9
- Neko Saito Group – strings on track 9
- Hiroshi Matsumoto – reading on track 10
- Eric Westfall – recording engineer (except track 5), mixing engineer on tracks 2, 6–8, 8 (REPSYCLE Ver.), 10, piano on track 8
- Bill Kennedy – mixing engineer on tracks 1, 3, 4,
- Rich Breen – mixing engineer on track 9
- Yasushi Konishi – recording engineer on track 2
- Daiei Matsumoto – recording engineer on tracks 4, 7, 10

Personnel per the album's liner notes.
