= List of best-selling singles in 1998 (Japan) =

This is a list of the best-selling singles in 1998 in Japan, as reported by Oricon.

Ranking	Single	Artist	Release	Sales
1	"Yuuwaku"	Glay	April 29, 1998	1,612,000
2	"Yozora no Mukō"	SMAP	January 14, 1998	1,571,000
3	"My Graduation"	Speed	February 18, 1998	1,475,000
4	"Timing"	Black Biscuits	April 22, 1998	1,451,000
5	"Soul Love"	Glay	April 29, 1998	1,372,000
6	"Nagai Aida"	Kiroro	January 21, 1998	1,182,000
7	"Honey"	L'Arc-en-Ciel	July 8, 1998	1,173,000
8	"Aisareru yori Aishitai"	KinKi Kids	November 12, 1997	1,135,000
9	"Time Goes By"	Every Little Thing	February 11, 1998	1,132,000
10	"Zenbu Dakishimete"	KinKi Kids	July 29, 1998	1,127,000
11	"Pink Spider"	hide with Spread Beaver	May 13, 1998	1,033,000
12	"Ashita ga Kikoeru/Children's Holiday"	J-Friends	January 21, 1998	1,021,000
13	"All My True Love"	Speed	October 28, 1998	1,012,000
14	"Kasou"	L'Arc-en-Ciel	July 8, 1998	1,009,000
15	"Snow Drop"	L'Arc-en-Ciel	October 7, 1998	997,000
