= Tribute Spirits =

Compilation album by various artists
- Released: May 1, 1999
- Genre: Rock
- Length: 65:55
- Language: Japanese, English
- Label: Pony Canyon

hide compilation chronology
Tune Up (1997)	Tribute Spirits (1999)	Best ~Psychommunity~ (2000)

Tribute Spirits is a tribute album released on May 1, 1999, in memory of Japanese rock musician hide. It collects cover versions of his songs by various artists, among them most members of hide's former band X Japan.

It reached number one on the Oricon chart. By the end of 1999 it sold 783,760 copies, making it the 31st best-selling album of the year. It was certified double platinum by RIAJ in May 1999. As of 2005, it was the top-selling tribute album in Japan.

== Track listing ==
All tracks are written by hide

No.	Title	Length
1.	"Introduction" (Yoshiki, based on "Psychommunity Exit")	1:02
2.	"Rocket Dive" (Tomoyasu Hotei)	5:02
3.	"Beauty & Stupid" (Kiyoharu & Shoji)	4:35
4.	"Tell Me" (Kyo & Tetsu, of D'erlanger)	5:16
5.	"Pink Spider" (Siam Shade)	3:37
6.	"LEMONed I Scream" (Shame)	3:24
7.	"Pink Spider" (Cornelius)	4:27
8.	"Flame" (Zeppet Store)	4:57
9.	"Scanner" (Luna Sea)	3:48
10.	"Doubt '99" (Buck-Tick)	4:57
11.	"Ever Free" (Transtic Nerve)	4:19
12.	"Genkai Haretsu" (Oblivion Dust)	4:29
13.	"Misery" (Glay)	5:36
14.	"Celebration" (hide, I.N.A., Pata, Heath)	5:39
15.	"Good Bye" (Yoshiki)	4:46
