= Ever Free =

- Cover of the 2007 re-release

Single by hide with Spread Beaver

from the album Ja, Zoo
- Released: May 27, 1998
- Recorded: Early 1998
- Genre: Alternative rock
- Label: Universal Victor
- Songwriter: hide

Hide with Spread Beaver singles chronology
"Pink Spider" (1998)	"Ever Free" (1998)	"Hurry Go Round" (1998)

"Ever Free" is the tenth single by Japanese musician hide, the third to bear the hide with Spread Beaver name, released on May 27, 1998. It debuted at number one on the Oricon chart, replacing his previous single "Pink Spider", and was the 23rd best-selling single of the year and certified double platinum by the RIAJ.

On May 2, 2007, the single was re-released. On December 8, 2010, it was re-released again as part of the third releases in "The Devolution Project", which was a release of hide's original eleven singles on picture disc vinyl.

== Recording ==
According to recording engineer and Spread Beaver member Kazuhiko "I.N.A." Inada, he and hide wanted hide's singles to be different from each other; this being why they followed "Rocket Dive", his first since X Japan disbanded and which I.N.A. described as a refreshing number with a sense of speed, with "Pink Spider". For "Ever Free", the two used a lightly distorted guitar sound and thought about how to balance the world of the lyrics between the three songs.

I.N.A. estimated that there were about seven different versions of "Ever Free", featuring various tempos and melodies, before reaching the finished track. They started by having Joe record drums. But they did not have much time because hide and I.N.A. were going back and forth between Los Angeles and Japan, so Joe played while listening to a minor-key demo that was completely different from the final arrangement. Thus, they had to edit the drums to make it consistent, and when Joe heard the final version, he said, "What is this? I didn't play on this."

== Music video ==
The music video for "Ever Free" is composed of behind the scenes footage of hide with Spread Beaver at photo shoots and filming the "Pink Spider" music video. There is additional archival footage of the band playing the song in a jam session at the Chili Factory Studio.

== Reception ==
"Ever Free" debuted at number one on the Japanese Oricon weekly charts, replacing his previous single "Pink Spider", with sales of over 516,000 in the initial week. By the end of the year it sold 842,440 copies and was the 23rd best-selling single of the year, being certified double Platinum by the RIAJ.

== Track listing ==
All songs written by hide.

No.	Title	Length
1.	"Ever Free"	3:39
2.	"Ever Free (Voiceless Version)"	3:51
3.	Untitled (hidden track)	6:10

- The hidden untitled third track begins with 5 minutes and 13 seconds of silence, representing May 13, the date "Pink Spider" was released, before playing a piece of that song.

== Personnel ==
- hide – vocals, guitar, bass
- Joe – drums
- Eric Westfall – mixing engineer, recording engineer (at Sunset Sound)
- S. Husky Höskulds – assistant engineer (Sunset Sound Factory)
- Daiei Matsumoto – recording engineer (at Hitokuchizaka-Studio)
- Kazuhiko Inada – recording engineer
- Hiroshi Nemoto – assistant engineer (Hitokuchizaka-Studio)
- Kevin Dean – assistant engineer (Sunset Sound)

Personnel per Ja, Zoo liner notes.

== Cover versions ==
"Ever Free" was covered by Transtic Nerve on the 1999 hide tribute album Tribute Spirits.

It was also covered live by DJ Ozma at the hide memorial summit on May 3, 2008.

An instrumental version of the song was included in the soundtrack of the movie Attitude, which was scored by hide's former X bandmate Taij.

The track was covered by defspiral, which is composed of four of the five former members of Transtic Nerve, for the Tribute II -Visual Spirits- tribute album and by Born for Tribute III -Visual Spirits-, both albums were released on July 3, 2013.

Yuki Koyanagi recorded a version of "Ever Free" for Tribute VI -Female Spirits-, released on December 18, 2013.

It was covered by Takanori Nishikawa for the June 6, 2018 Tribute Impulse album.

On January 1, 2023, Knock Out Monkey released a cover of "Ever Free". The artwork and music video both feature various homages to hide's originals.

== Legacy ==
Kazutaka Kodaka, a longtime fan of hide, was given permission to use "Ever Free" for the Danganronpa 3 anime.
