= Moon Flower (album) =

Studio album by the Underneath
- Released: March 18, 2008 (US); July 23, 2008 (JP)
- Genre: Hard rock; heavy metal; hardcore punk
- Length: 46:07 (US)
- Label: JShock/UMG (US); Stirring/Def Spiral (JP)

Moon Flower is the first album by the Underneath released on March 18, 2008 in the U.S. and on July 23, 2008 in Japan. The Japanese edition had a different track-order, an extra song titled "Getting Closer" and all of the tracks were re-mixed and remastered.

== Track listing ==
U.S. Edition

No.	Title	Length
1.	"Gekkoh" (月影)	4:52
2.	"Chain" (連鎖)	4:27
3.	"Marie" (堕罪)	4:17
4.	"Deep" (紺碧)	5:34
5.	"Fall" (落陽)	4:23
6.	"Fatty Fatty Fuckin' Pigs" (飽食の豚)	3:40
7.	"Bite the Bullet" (銃爪)	4:16
8.	"Alone Together" (花舞)	4:16
9.	"Womb is Planet" (惑星)	5:40
10.	"Prayer" (祈り)	4:42

Japan Edition

No.	Title	Length
1.	"Getting Closer"
2.	"Chain"
3.	"Gekkoh"
4.	"Fat Fatty Fuckin' Pigs"
5.	"Fall"
6.	"Alone Together"
7.	"Womb is Planet"
8.	"Marie"
9.	"Prayer"
10.	"Bite the Bullet"
11.	"Deep"
