= Psyence =

Studio album by hide
- Released: September 2, 1996
- Recorded: 1995–1996
- Genres: Alternative rock, industrial rock
- Length: 62:16
- Label: MCA Victor
- Producer: hide

Hide chronology
Hide Your Face (1994)	Psyence (1996)	Ja, Zoo (1998)

Singles from Psyence
- 1. "Misery" Released: June 24, 1996; 2. "Beauty & Stupid" Released: August 12, 1996; 3. "Hi-Ho/Good Bye" Released: December 18, 1996

Professional ratings
Review scores
Source	Rating
Allmusic	4.5/5 stars

Psyence is the second album by Japanese musician hide, released on September 2, 1996. It topped the Oricon Albums Chart and was certified double platinum by the RIAJ for sales over 500,000 copies. The album was re-released on the Japan only format SHM-CD on December 3, 2008.

== Overview ==
Eric Westfall, one of the album's recording and mixing engineers, was told that hide requested to work with him after the musician heard some of Westfall's work and liked the guitar sounds.

When forming Zilch, hide and Kazuhiko "I.N.A." Inada did not preemptively divide the songs they were working on between hide's solo career and the new band. As such, an English version of "Damage" was first recorded before the Japanese version that appears on Psyence, but it was not included on 3.2.1..

The version of "Misery" that appears on the album is a remix of the original single. The version of "LEMONed I Scream" heard on the album is different than the one originally included as the B-side to the "Misery" single. Although "Lassie" is listed as "Demo Master Version", no other version of the song has been released.

== Commercial performance ==
Psyence reached the number 1 position on the Oricon Albums Chart. The 2008 re-release reached number 219 on the chart.

The album was certified Gold by the RIAJ in September 1996, Platinum in December 1998, and Double Platinum in February 2020 for sales over 500,000.

== Track listing ==
All tracks are written by hide.

No.	Title	Length
1.	"Psyence"	3:18
2.	"Erase"	3:25
3.	"Genkai Haretsu (限界破裂)"	4:42
4.	"Damage"	4:34
5.	"LEMONed I Scream (Choco-Chip Version)"	2:47
6.	"Hi-Ho"	5:46
7.	"Flame"	5:20
8.	"Beauty & Stupid"	4:06
9.	"Oedo Cowboys"	1:22
10.	"Bacteria"	5:39
11.	"Good Bye"	3:59
12.	"Cafe Le Psyence"	1:00
13.	"Lassie (Demo Master Version)"	3:33
14.	"Pose"	4:57
15.	"Misery (Remix Version)"	5:10
16.	"Atomic M･O･M"	2:38

== Personnel ==
Main artist

- hide – vocals, guitar, bass (except for tracks 3, 10), arranger, producer

Musicians and production

- Kazuhiko Inada – programming, engineer
- Takashi Kaneuchi – bass on tracks 3, 10
- Satoshi "Joe" Miyawaki (ZIGGY) – drums except tracks 7, 11
- Eiki "Yana" Yanagita (ZEPPET STORE) – drums on tracks 7, 11
- Eric Westfall – piano, engineer

Personnel per the album's liner notes.

== Cover versions ==
"Genkai Haretsu" and "Flame" were covered, by Oblivion Dust and Zeppet Store respectively, on the 1999 hide tribute album Tribute Spirits. Oblivion Dust performed their version live on May 4, 2008, at the hide memorial summit, with "Flame", "Damage" and "Pose" also covered live earlier that same day by Hurdy Gurdy (Seizi Kimura of Zeppet Store), Ladies Room and D'espairsRay respectively. "Flame" was covered by defspiral for their 2011 hide tribute maxi single "Reply -Tribute to hide-". The Kiddie covered "Damage" for Tribute II -Visual Spirits-, while Tribute III -Visual Spirits- included a cover of "Genkai Haretsu" by Griever and "Bacteria" by Awoi. Both albums were released on July 3, 2013. Chay and J covered "Flame" for Tribute VI -Female Spirits- and Tribute VII -Rock Spirits- respectively. The second album also included D'erlanger covering "Genkai Haretsu" and a recording of "Pose" by Cutt. Both albums were released on December 18, 2013. "Bacteria" was covered by SexFriend, a duo consisting of Aina The End from BiSH and UK from Moroha, for the June 6, 2018 Tribute Impulse album.
