= In Motion (hide song) =

Single by hide
- Released: July 10, 2002
- Recorded: Hitokuchizaka Studio, One Voice Komazawa Studio
- Genre: Alternative rock
- Label: Universal J
- Songwriter: hide
- Producer: hide

Hide singles chronology
"Tell Me" (2000)	"In Motion" (2002)

"In Motion" is a song by Japanese musician hide released as a single on July 10, 2002. Notable for being released four years after his death, it reached number 4 on the Oricon Singles Chart. It was certified gold by the RIAJ in February 2020 for sales over 100,000.

== Overview ==
The demo track for "In Motion" was originally recorded during sessions for hide's second album Psyence, as was "Junk Story". I.N.A. completed it with contributions by other Spread Beaver members and Pata. Both "In Motion" and "Junk Story" were included on the Singles ~ Junk Story compilation a few days after this single.

The single's B-sides are remixes of two songs from Psyence, done by I.N.A, and an instrumental version of "In Motion".

== Track listing ==
All songs written by hide.

No.	Title	Length
1.	"In Motion"	4:58
2.	"Flame (Psyence Faction Version)" (Remixed by I.N.A.)	6:59
3.	"Pose (Mixed LEMONed Jelly Mix Ver.9)" (Remixed by I.N.A.)	6:19
4.	"In Motion (Voiceless Version)"	4:57

== Personnel ==
- hide – vocals
- I.N.A. – co-producer, programming
- Pata – guitar
- Kiyoshi – guitar
- Chirolyn – bass
- D.I.E. – keyboard
- Joe – drums
- Eric Westfall – mixing engineer, recording engineer

Personnel for "In Motion" only, per the single's liner notes.

== Cover versions ==
The title track was covered by Fest Vainqueur for the Tribute III -Visual Spirits- tribute album, which was released on July 3, 2013. Mini recorded a version for Tribute VI -Female Spirits-, released December 18, 2013.
