= Tokyo Yankees =

Japanese heavy metal band

- Origin: Tokyo, Japan
- Genres: Heavy metal; speed metal; hardcore punk; thrash metal
- Years active: 1988–present
- Labels: Extasy; TriadZ; Nippon Columbia; 413Tracks Inc.
- Members: Nori; Yoshinuma; U.D.A
- Past members: Ume; Ami; Tohda; Hiyori; Yamato; Ricky
- Website: Official website

Tokyo Yankees (stylized as TOKYO YANKEES and previously as 東京YANKEES) is a Japanese heavy metal band that formed in Tokyo in 1988. The current lineup up consists of guitarist Nori, bassist and vocalist Yoshinuma, and drummer U.D.A. Japanese pop culture website Real Sound noted that Tokyo Yankees are sometimes referred to as the "Japanese Motörhead," whose sound bridged heavy metal and punk rock.

== History ==
=== Beginning and success ===
Tokyo Yankees formed in 1988 and began playing shows in the local club scene the following year. Umemura and Nori were previously in the heavy metal band Guerilla, while U.D.A and Ami were in the speed/thrash metal band Rommel. Rockin 'f, a Japanese heavy metal publication, issued their first single, "Joker", with an issue of their magazine in 1990. That same year their song "Rat Race" was issued on an omnibus album titled The End of the Century Rockers Emergency Express II. The band eventually signed with Extasy Records, who released their debut album, Do The Dirty, in 1991. That year they participated in Extasy Records' Extasy Summit '91 at the Nippon Budokan to a crowd of 14,000.

The band released another record, Overdoing, on Extasy in 1992. The band's popularity peaked at that point, gaining them a contract with major label Nippon Columbia, where they released two albums; 1993's Ghost Rider and 1994's Vacate Your Useless Brain. The band's popularity declined afterwards, and they returned to the indies scene in 1995.

Ami and U.D.A left after the band returned to the indies scene. Yoshinuma (ex. Grimm the Capsule) replaced Ami in 1996, and Yamato replaced U.D.A. Ricky replaced Yamato after their 1996 tour. After Tokyo Yankees, Ami went on to form Charisma, who released three albums between 1997 and 2000.

A Tokyo Yankees compilation LP was issued from Nippon Columbia in 1996. The band continued to perform in the local club circuits, and participated in V/A releases. After U.D.A returned in 2000, the band released Pre-Emptive Strike in 2003. A year later they issued 777, their second EP. It features covers of influential bands (The Damned, Black Sabbath, Venom, and Anthrax) and well as re-recordings of two classic Yankees tracks; "Dirty Dog" and "Devil".

=== Recent activity ===
Vocalist Soichiro "Ume" Umemura died on December 11, 2007. The band decided to continued on, with Yoshi taking over vocal duties. On May 4, 2008, Tokyo Yankees performed at the hide memorial summit at the 50,000 seat Ajinomoto Stadium, giving the group the opportunity to play for a large audience. Later that month, the band was featured on 413Tracks' Motörhead Tribute album with a recording of "Ace of Spades" and a live rendition of "Overkill". July saw the release a history DVD chronicling Tokyo Yankees career, and celebrating their 20th anniversary titled 20 and Alive [We Are The Yankees Of The Underworld And We're Undead!], which Yankee's supported with a small tour.

Nori, Yoshi and U.D.A continue to perform as Tokyo Yankees and gig in the greater Tokyo area, and around Japan. Recent videos posted on Facebook and YouTube show the band sometimes performing with guest vocalists. The band also has maintained a friendly relationship with former members Ami and Tohda, both of whom occasionally joined the band on stage. Sometimes they play entire shows with Ami on bass and Tohda on guitar (the former being somewhat more frequent until his death in 2017), in which case Yoshinuma takes over full-time on vocals for the performance. In September 2012, they performed alongside Ra:IN, Der Zibet and Ladies Room at the Yokohama Summer Rock Fes. – Revolution Rocks 2012. In June 2015, Tokyo Yankees took part in the first night of the Lunatic Fest at Makuhari Messe hosted by Luna Sea.

Since 2003 Nori has been active in his side-band From Hell, they have released two EP's and play one or two shows a month. Yoshi also plays in his side-band Blotto Rockers once a month. Occasionally when Nori plays with Kabukichou Boys and Yoshi with Go Bands, both bands use the name Fake And Liar.

== Members ==
=== Current members ===
- Masanori "Nori" Hashimoto – guitar 1988–present (ex-Guerrilla, From Hell, Fake And Liar)
- Hironori "Yoshi" Yoshinuma – bass, vocals 1996–present (Grimm the Capsule, Blotto Rockers, Fake and Liar)
- Takashi "U.D.A" Udagawa – drums 1988–1995, 2000–present (ex-Dementia, ex-Rommel, ex-Blotto Rockers)

=== Former members ===
- Soichiro "Ume" Umemura (梅村総一郎) – vocals 1988–2007; his death (ex-Guerrilla)
- Masahiro "Ami" Arayama (荒山正広) – bass 1988–1995 (ex-Rommel, Charisma, G.D. Flickers, Blotto Rockers)
- Tohda – guitar 1988–1990 (Samurai Blondies) Died June 13, 2017.
- Hiyori – vocals 1988 (Youthquake)
- Inoue – bass 1995
- Mizushima – drums 1995
- Yamato – drums 1996
- Ricky – drums 1996–2000 (Bagnag)

== Discography ==
=== Singles ===
- "Joker" (October 28, 1990)

=== Albums ===
- Do the Dirty (May 20, 1991)
- Overdoing (October 20, 1992)
- Ghostrider (October 5, 1993), Oricon Albums Chart Peak Position: No. 46
- Vacate Your Useless Brain (September 21, 1994)
- The Best of Tokyo Yankees '93–'95 (June 21, 1996)
- Pre Emptive Strike (October 14, 2003)
- 777 (October 9, 2004)

=== Videos ===
- Unrivaled is Extasy ~ Extasy Summit '91 at Nippon Budokan (February 21, 1992)
  - Perform "Dive into Field" and "Ace of Spades", the latter with hide and Pata, and make various off-shot appearances.
- Minna ga Mumei-Datta, Dakedo... Muteki-Datta ~ Extasy Summit 1992 (May 10, 1993)
  - Perform "Big Game" and "Drugstore Cowboy", the latter with hide, Pata and Yoshiki, and make various off-shot appearances.
- 20 and Alive [We Are The Yankees of The Underworld and We're Undead!] (August 27, 2008)

=== Other ===
- The End of the Century Rockers Emergency Express II (October 21, 1990, "Rat Race")
- Lightning & Thunder (October 1, 1998, "Light My Fire" and "Japanese Motherfucker")
- History of Extasy (June 21, 2000, "Japanese Motherfucker")
- Tribute to Masami -White Disc- ("Dead Rock")
- 413Tracks' Motorhead Tribute (May 14, 2008, "Ace of Spades" and "Overkill")
- Gargoism (May 17, 2008, "Halleluyah")
- Hard 'N' Heavy 2010 (February 13, 2010, "So What (Demo)")
  - Various artists compilation album in Vol. 15 of We Rock magazine
