= Heidi (band) =

Japanese visual kei rock band

Heidi.

Background information
- Origin: Tokyo, Japan
- Genres: Alternative rock; indie rock
- Years active: 2006–present
- Labels: O Market, Geneon Universal Entertainment, Gan-Shin (EU)
- Members: Yoshihiko; Nao; Kohsuke; Kiri
- Website: heidi-net.com

Heidi. (stylized as heidi.) is a Japanese visual kei rock band formed in Tokyo in February 2006. They gained popularity after performing at the memorial concert on the 10th anniversary of the death of the musician hide on May 4, 2008, to tens of thousands of people. Their third album was released in Europe by Gan-Shin records in 2009 and the following year Heidi. signed to major label Geneon Universal Entertainment.

== History ==
Heidi.'s first one-man show, titled 「Birth・Day」, was on June 3, 2006. Their first single, "Yuuyake to Kodomo/Maria", was also sold at that show. The following year they released their debut album, Kasou, on April 25, 2007. The label was their own O Market, which was formed by their management Headwax Organization, who also managed hide, being run by his brother Hiroshi Matsumoto.

On May 4, 2008, they performed at the hide memorial summit alongside legendary bands such as X Japan, Luna Sea and others. On September 21, 2008, D'erlanger held Abstinence's Door #002, where Heidi., Inoran and Merry performed.

In 2009, Heidi. went on a three-man tour called Counter Culture with lynch. and Sadie. They released their third album, Panorama, on September 23. It received a European release by Gan-Shin records on October 23. On October 25, the band performed at V-Rock Festival '09, which was broadcast live worldwide on its official website.

On May 26, 2010, they released their major label debut on Geneon Universal Entertainment, the single "Yokan". This song and their next single, "∞Loop", were both used as ending theme songs to the Kaichou wa Maid-sama! anime. Senkou Mellow was released on October 6, and is currently their highest-charting album.

They covered hide with Spread Beaver's "Pink Spider" for the compilation Crush! -90's V-Rock Best Hit Cover Songs-, the album was released on January 26, 2011, and features current visual kei bands covering songs from bands that were important to the '90s visual kei movement. Heidi.'s single "Gekkou Showtime" was used as the theme song for the movie Maebashi Visual Kei, which stars Shunsuke Kazama as a young farmer who tries to make it big in a visual kei band. The band members themselves also make an appearance in the film. In July 2011, Heidi. made their United States debut at the anime convention AM².

They released their fifth album, Alpha, on September 19, 2012. Later in the month, they returned to the US for a performance at Anime Weekend Atlanta. On November 7, Heidi. began a nationwide tour, that ended at Shibuya-AX, where each concert was broadcast live on NicoNico.

On August 16, 2013, heidi. performed at an event put on by the band Angelo, alongside other acts such as Inoran, lynch. and Mucc. They contributed a cover of hide's "Tell Me" to the Tribute II -Visual Spirits- tribute album, which was released on July 3, 2013.

Throughout April 2014, the band went on their first European tour which included stops in Russia, Poland, Germany and Finland among others. From November 7–9 they performed at the Pacific Media Expo in Los Angeles.

== Members ==
- Yoshihiko (義彦) – vocals
- Nao (ナオ) – guitar, backing vocals
- Kohsuke (コースケ) – bass, backing vocals
- Kiri (桐) Koishikawa – drums

== Discography ==
Studio albums

- Kasou (渦奏; April 25, 2007), Oricon Albums Chart Peak Position: No. 132
- Innocence (イノセンス; April 30, 2008) No. 55
- Panorama (パノラマ; September 23, 2009) No. 80
- Senkou Mellow (閃光メロウ; October 6, 2010) No. 41
- Alpha (アルファ; September 19, 2012) No. 138
- Human (ヒューマン; May 14, 2014) No. 62
- Kaikou (邂逅; December 28, 2016) No. 122
- Que Sera Sera (ケセラセラ; August 29, 2018) No. 125
- Hyōhon (標本; October 23, 2019) No. 218

Singles

- "Yuuyake to Kodomo/Maria" (夕焼けと子供/マリア; June 3, 2006)
- "Clover" (クローバー; November 15, 2006), Oricon Singles Chart Peak Position: No. 178, Oricon Indies Chart: No. 11
- "Shinkuro/Hyururi" (シンクロ/ひゅるり; October 24, 2007) No. 67 Oricon Indies Chart: No. 2
- "Rem" (レム; February 14, 2008) No. 44
- "Orange Drama" (オレンジドラマ; November 5, 2008) No. 41
- "Tsubasa" (翼; May 20, 2009) No. 38
- "Yokan" (予感; May 26, 2010) No. 32 – first ending theme of the Kaichou wa Maid-sama! anime
- "∞Loop" (∞ループ; August 25, 2010) No. 48 – second ending theme of the Kaichou wa Maid-sama! anime
- "Gekkou Showtime" (月光ショータイム; February 2, 2011) No. 51 – theme song of the film Maebashi Visual Kei
- "Kumori Zora ni ha Koi Moyou (曇り空には恋模様; August 22, 2012) No. 101
- "Ryusei Dive" (流星ダイヴ; May 1, 2013) – limited concert-only single
- "Renai Remind" (恋愛リマインド; April 29, 2015) No. 194
- "Sakura Underground" (サクラアンダーグラウンド; November 16, 2016) No. 143
- "Sunset Blue" (サンセットブルー; July 19, 2017) No. 111
- "Ray" (January 24, 2018) No. 88
- "Halation" (June 3, 2019)

Mini albums

- Crying (慟哭; August 2, 2006)
- Sixth Sense (シックスセンス; September 21, 2011) No. 84

Live albums

- Live Tour 2009 [Panorama] @ Shibuya C.C. Lemon Hall (March 10, 2010, CD & DVD)

Compilation albums

- Kaisou heidi. Indies Best (回想 heidi. Indies BEST; February 8, 2012) No. 63
- Kaisou -heidi. The Best 2006–2016- (回奏-heidi. the best 2006-2016-; June 8, 2016) No. 149

Various artists compilations

- Shock Wave CD (sixth edition)
- Shock Edge 2006 (October 10, 2006)
- Cannon Ball Vol.3 (February 21, 2007)
- Crush! -90's V-Rock Best Hit Cover Songs- (January 26, 2011)
- V-Anime Rocks (August 1, 2012)
- Tribute II -Visual Spirits- (July 3, 2013)
