= Misery (hide song) =

Single by hide

from the album Psyence
- Released: June 24, 1996
- Recorded: A&M Studio
- Genre: Alternative rock
- Label: MCA Victor
- Songwriter(s): hide

Hide singles chronology
"Tell Me" (1994)	"Misery" (1996)	"Beauty & Stupid" (1996)

"Misery" is the fifth single by Japanese musician hide, released on June 24, 1996. It reached number 3 on the Oricon chart. It was certified gold by RIAJ in July 1996. On May 2, 2007, the single was re-released with a slightly different cover. On August 4, 2010, it was re-released again as part of the second releases in "The Devolution Project", which was a release of hide's original eleven singles on picture disc vinyl.

== Track listing ==
All songs written by hide.

No.	Title	Length
1.	"Misery"	5:01
2.	"LEMONed I Scream"	2:49

== Personnel ==
- hide – vocals, guitar, bass, producer, arranger
- Kazuhiko "I.N.A." Inada – co-producer, programming, recording engineer on "Misery", recording and mixing engineer on "LEMONed I Scream"
- Eric Westfall – recording and mixing engineer on "Misery"

Personnel per the single's liner notes.

== Cover versions ==
"Misery" and "LEMONed I Scream" were covered by Glay and Shame respectively on the 1999 hide tribute album Tribute Spirits. Glay performed their cover live on July 31, 1999 at their first Glay Expo, entitled Glay Expo '99 Survival, it was recorded and used as a b-side on their 2000 single "Happiness: Winter Remix". "Misery" was covered live by Daizystripper at the hide memorial summit on May 3, 2008 and Hurdy Gurdy (Seizi Kimura of Zeppet Store) covered "LEMONed I Scream" later that same day. A studio version of "Misery" by Daizystripper appears on the Tribute II -Visual Spirits- tribute album, which was released on July 3, 2013. May's covered the title track for Tribute VI -Female Spirits-, while Glay's version was remixed by Spread Beaver member INA for Tribute VII -Rock Spirits-. Both albums were released on December 18, 2013.
