= Lemoned Plant =

Japanese independent record label

LEMONed Plant
- Parent company: Universal Music Group
- Founded: 1996
- Founder: Hideto Matsumoto
- Status: Unknown
- Genre: Alternative rock, electronic rock, experimental rock, progressive rock
- Country of origin: Japan
- Location: Tokyo
- Official website: Official website

Lemoned Plant (stylized as LEMONed plant) is a Japanese independent record label. It was founded as LEMONed in 1996 by popular rock musician Hideto "hide" Matsumoto. The retail store Lemoned Shop was later created, and seems to have become the main focus.

== History ==
The label began as Lemoned and was part of a wider range of businesses under the same name; such as the Lemoned Shop. Its title comes from the slang use of the English word "lemon" to describe a defective product. Lemoned was created as a venue for unsigned musicians that Matsumoto watched perform in local clubs in Japan. The first band signed to this label was Zeppet Store. A compilation album simply titled Lemoned was released on May 22, 1996, by MCA Victor, it includes songs by hide, Zeppet Store, Trees of Life, and Vinyl (band of former D'erlanger vocalist Dizzy).

The album Cafe Le Psyence -hide LEMONed Compilation- was released on May 16, 2002, and besides featuring songs by hide and Zeppet Store, includes work by shame, Transtic Nerve, Yukito, Dope HEADz and zilch. An actual operating cafe of that name, which doubled as a concert venue, and a Lemoned Shop were later created as part of the hide museum in hide's hometown of Yokosuka, which was opened on July 20, 2000, and closed on September 25, 2005.

After a period of inactivity following the 1998 death of its founder, Lemoned returned in 2005 with Yukito's debut album. The label was relaunched as Headwax Corporation subsidiary Lemoned Plant in 2007, opening a website and creating a MySpace profile. Acts signed to the label included Hurdy Gurdy, the solo project of former Zeppet Store member Seizi Kimura, 0 Limited Execution, Trees Asylum and Plastic. Lemoned has two retail stores, the original being in Shinjuku, the other in Harajuku.
