= 3.2.1. =

- The album's cover featuring members Paul Raven, hide and Ray McVeigh.

Studio album by Zilch
- Released: July 23, 1998
- Recorded: 1996–1997
- Studio: A&M (Hollywood)
- Genres: Industrial rock; alternative metal
- Length: 49:28
- Label: Cutting Edge
- Producer: Ray McVeigh

Zilch chronology
3.2.1. (1998)	Bastard Eyes (1999)

3.2.1. is the debut album by the rock band Zilch, released on July 23, 1998. It is their only work with original frontman hide, due to his death two months before its release. The album reached number 2 on the Oricon chart, and was the 54th best-selling album of the year, and was certified Double Platinum by the RIAJ for sales over 800,000.

== Overview ==
Although recorded in 1996–1997, 3.2.1. was not released until 1998 due to difficulties finding an American record label.

Unlike hide's solo work, 3.2.1. relies entirely on English lyrics because hide wanted it to be released worldwide. Some of the songs are "re-recordings" of hide's previously released songs ("Doubt", "Pose"). However, hide has mentioned in interviews that songs such as "Pose" and "Inside the Pervert Mound" was recorded first with Zilch. The album was released much later even though the recording was done because they were unable to find a record company to distribute the album in the United States. "What's Up Mr. Jones?" is an English version of "Drain" by hide's earlier band X Japan. "Fuctrack 6" uses elements of "FROZEN BUG '93" from hide's debut album "Hide Your Face", but features newly written melodies and lyrics. It seems like "Easy Jesus" has the similar guitar riff from hide's "Squeeze It!!". hide mentioned in an interview that "Inside The Pervert Mound" was recorded first and he decided to cover it in Japanese, naming it "Leather Face". The album also includes a cover of The Sensational Alex Harvey Band's "Swampsnake".

=== Outtakes ===
There is an unreleased song whose existence of has been revealed by hide's co-producer I.N.A., the song "DAMAGE" with a strong industrial flavor is included in hide's 2nd album "PSYENCE". So far, it has been played in the museum during the final campaign when the hide museum was closed, and it has been shown several times at hide-related events.

=== Bastard Eyes and other appearances ===
In 1999, the band released the album Bastard Eyes, which includes remixes of the songs on 3.2.1. by various different artists. "Inside The Pervert Mound" appeared on the Heavy Metal 2000 soundtrack, "Electric Cucumber" was included on the 2002 compilation album Cafe Le Psyence -hide Lemoned Compilation-, and "Psyche" in the soundtrack to Catacombs. "Electric Cucumber" was covered by Acid Android for the June 6, 2018 hide tribute album Tribute Impulse.

== Track listing ==
All songwriting credited to hide and McVeigh, except track 5, credited to The Sensational Alex Harvey Band.

No.	Title	Length
1.	"Electric Cucumber"	4:59
2.	"Inside the Pervert Mound"	3:58
3.	"Sold Some Attitude"	4:06
4.	"Space Monkey Punks from Japan"	4:45
5.	"Swampsnake"	2:42
6.	"What’s Up Mr. Jones?"	3:26
7.	"Hey Man So Long"	4:14
8.	"Psyche"	4:41
9.	"Fuctrack #6"	3:25
10.	"Doubt"	4:52
11.	"Pose"	3:53
12.	"Easy Jesus"	4:34

== Personnel ==
- hide – vocals, guitar
- Ray McVeigh – vocals, guitar
- Paul Raven – bass, backing vocals
- Joey Castillo – drums
- I.N.A. – programming
- Scott Garrett – additional drums on tracks 1 & 11
- Chris Vrenna – additional drums on tracks 9 & 10
- Steve Jones – guest guitar on track 4
- Geordie Walker – guest guitar on track 9
- Korey Clark – guest vocals on track 4
- James Hall – guest vocals on track 5
- Jaz Coleman and Yvette Lera – guest vocals on track 9
- Momo Kakimoto – Japanese talk on track 1
- MC Shabba D – rap

Personnel per the album's liner notes.
