= Rocket Dive =

- Cover of the 2007 re-release.

Single by hide with Spread Beaver

from the album Ja, Zoo
- Released: January 28, 1998
- Recorded: Late 1997
- Genre: Alternative rock; hard rock
- Label: Universal Victor
- Songwriter: hide

Hide with Spread Beaver singles chronology
"Hi-Ho/Good Bye" (1996)	"Rocket Dive" (1998)	"Pink Spider" (1998)

"Rocket Dive" is the eighth single by Japanese musician hide, the first to bear the hide with Spread Beaver name, released on January 28, 1998. It reached number 4 on the Oricon Singles Chart and was the 33rd best-selling single of the year. It has been certified double platinum by the RIAJ for sales over 500,000 copies.

The song's name and intro are a homage to Kiss' "Rocket Ride". Its music video was directed by Shūichi Tan, who went on to direct the video for hide's next single, "Pink Spider".

On May 2, 2007, the single was re-released with a slightly different cover. On December 8, 2010, it was re-released again as part of the third releases in "The Devolution Project", which was a release of hide's original eleven singles on picture disc vinyl.

"Rocket Dive" is the last single to be released in hide's lifetime, as it was released four months before his death on May 2, 1998.

== Reception ==
"Rocket Dive" reached number 4 on the Oricon Singles Chart. By the end of 1998 it sold 690,220 copies, making it the 33rd best-selling single of the year. The single was certified gold by the RIAJ in February 1998, platinum in May 1998, and double platinum in February 2020 for sales over 500,000.

It was used as the opening theme song for the 1998 anime series AWOL -Absent Without Leave- and appeared on its soundtrack. It was the theme song of the Fuji TV variety show Rocket Live, which aired from October 2012 to March 2013.

== Track listing ==
All songs written by hide.

No.	Title	Length
1.	"Rocket Dive"	3:41
2.	"Rocket Dive (Voiceless Version)"	3:42
3.	"Doubt (Mixed LEMONed Jelly Mix)"	3:59

== Personnel ==
- hide – vocals, guitar, bass, arranger, producer
- Joe – drums
- Eric Westfall – mixing engineer, recording engineer (at Victor Studio)
- Ritsuko Baba – assistant engineer (Victor Studio)
- Yasushi Konishi – recording engineer (at Studio Somewhere)
- Kazuhiko Inada – recording engineer

Personnel for "Rocket Dive" per Ja, Zoo liner notes.

== Cover versions ==
The song was covered by Tomoyasu Hotei on the 1999 hide tribute album Tribute Spirits. As the album was produced following hide's death, Hotei added some lyrics, including the line "Saraba akai kami no eirian" ('Farewell red-haired alien') at the end.

Tetsuya Komuro remixed the song for his 2007 album Cream of J-Pop ~Utaitsuguuta~, which was released under the name DJ TK.

It was also covered by Megamasso on the compilation Crush! 2 -90's V-Rock Best Hit Cover Songs-, which was released on November 23, 2011 and features current visual kei bands covering songs from bands that were important to the '90s visual kei movement.

defspiral covered it for their 2011 maxi-single "Reply -Tribute to hide-", which also included the band's interpretations of three other hide songs. hide had signed the members' previous band, Transtic Nerve, to his label Lemoned shortly before his death in 1998.

It was covered by And for the compilation album Counteraction - V-Rock covered Visual Anime songs Compilation-, which was released on May 23, 2012 and features covers of songs by visual kei bands that were used in anime.

The track was covered by R-Shitei for the Tribute II -Visual Spirits- tribute album, which was released on July 3, 2013.

Amiaya and Kishidan recorded versions for Tribute VI -Female Spirits- and Tribute VII -Rock Spirits-, respectively. Both albums were released on December 18, 2013.

Luna Sea covered "Rocket Dive" at the second day of their rock festival, Lunatic Fest on June 28, 2015.

The song was covered by Dragon Ash for the June 6, 2018 Tribute Impulse album.

Flow covered the song at the first day of their anime song rock festival, Flow The Festival on June 6, 2026, alongside Spread Beaver members INA and Kiyoshi, and the other performers of the festival, including Survive Said The Prophet, Uchikubi Gokumon Dōkōkai, Home Made Kazoku, Granrodeo, Raise A Suilen and SunSet Swish.
