= Bastard Eyes =

Remix album by Zilch
- Released: March 3, 1999
- Genres: Industrial metal; industrial dance
- Length: 63:31
- Labels: Cutting Edge, Rhythm Republic

Zilch chronology
3.2.1. (1998)	Bastard Eyes (1999)	Skyjin (2001)

Bastard Eyes is a remix album from the band Zilch, released on March 3, 1999. The tracks on this album are remixes, done by numerous different bands and artists, of the songs from their debut album 3.2.1.. The limited edition reached number 5 on the Oricon chart, while the regular peaked at number 24.

== Track list ==
No.	Title	Length
1.	"Electric Kyōdai Jingi Cucumber (ＥＬＥＣＴＲＩＣ 兄弟仁義 ＣＵＣＵＭＢＥＲ) (J Remix)"	6:41
2.	"Fuct Fuctrack #6 (Charlie Clouser Remix)"	6:08
3.	"Pervert Hound (Pitchshifter Remix)"	5:18
4.	"Impose (Praga Khan Remix)"	4:02
5.	"Scratch Your Number (DJ Swamp Remix)"	4:40
6.	"Hello Hello Hello Goodbye (Ministry & Paul Raven Remix)"	5:13
7.	"Repsychle (Tweaker Remix)"	5:45
8.	"Listen In Listen Up (Danny Saber & MC Shabba D Remix)"	6:00
9.	"Sold Some Attitude (I.N.A., D.I.E. & K.A.Z Remix)"	4:31
10.	"Superschaftrack (Schaft Remix)"	3:54
11.	"Sleasy Jesus (DJ Swamp, Ray McVeigh & Ryder Remix)"	5:20
12.	"Queasy Jesus (Ray McVeigh & Ryder Remix)"	4:34
