= Beauty & Stupid =

Single by hide

from the album Psyence
- Released: August 12, 1996
- Recorded: Sunset Sound
- Genre: Alternative rock
- Label: MCA Victor
- Songwriter(s): hide
- Producer(s): hide

Hide singles chronology
"Misery" (1996)	"Beauty & Stupid" (1996)	"Hi-Ho/Good Bye" (1996)

Audio sample
- file; help

"Beauty & Stupid" is the sixth single by Japanese musician hide, released on August 12, 1996. It reached number 4 on the Oricon chart. It was certified gold by RIAJ in December 1998. On May 2, 2007, the single was re-released with a slightly different cover. On August 4, 2010, it was re-released again as part of the second releases in "The Devolution Project", which was a release of hide's original eleven singles on picture disc vinyl.

== Track listing ==
All songs written by hide.

No.	Title	Length
1.	"Beauty & Stupid"	4:06
2.	"Squeeze It!!"	2:21

== Personnel ==
- hide – vocals, guitar, bass, producer, arranger
- Kazuhiko "I.N.A." Inada – co-producer, programming, recording engineer on "Beauty & Stupid", recording and mixing engineer on "Squeeze It!!"
- Joe – drums on "Beauty & Stupid"
- Eric Westfall – recording engineer on "Beauty & Stupid"

Personnel per the single's liner notes.

== Cover versions ==
The song "Easy Jesus" by hide's band Zilch has a similar guitar riff to that of "Squeeze It!!". "Beauty & Stupid" was covered by Kiyoharu and Shoji for the 1999 hide tribute album Tribute Spirits. The title track was covered by Doppel for the Tribute II -Visual Spirits- tribute album and by Diaura on Tribute III -Visual Spirits-, both albums were released on July 3, 2013. For Tribute VI -Female Spirits-, released on December 18, 2013, it was covered by Kanon Wakeshima.
