= Hurry Go Round =

Single by hide with Spread Beaver

from the album Ja, Zoo
- Released: October 21, 1998
- Genre: Rock
- Label: Universal Victor
- Songwriter: hide
- Producer: hide

Hide with Spread Beaver singles chronology
"Ever Free" (1998)	"Hurry Go Round" (1998)	"Tell Me" (2000)

"Hurry Go Round" is the eleventh single by the Japanese musician hide, the fourth to bear the hide with Spread Beaver name, released on October 21, 1998. The song was left incomplete at the time of hide's death on May 2, 1998, being finished by his Spread Beaver bandmates and included on the album Ja, Zoo. It reached number 2 on the Oricon Singles Chart and has been certified double platinum by the RIAJ for sales over 500,000.

On May 2, 2007, the single was re-released with a new cover. On December 8, 2010, it was re-released again as part of the third releases in "The Devolution Project", which was a release of hide's original eleven singles on picture disc vinyl.

== Background ==
At the Visual Japan Summit on October 15, 2016, Teru of Glay said that he was told their 1997 single "However" inspired hide to write "Hurry Go Round".

"Hurry Go Round" was one of the songs from Ja, Zoo that was unfinished at the time of hide's death. Eric Westfall, one of the album's recording and mixing engineers, revealed that a week or so after hide's death, he and I.N.A had an emotionally difficult time finishing the album as televisions they had on in the studio were still showing footage of and talking about the dead musician. He said that "Hurry Go Round" gave them particular difficulty due to its "heavy" or somber lyrical theme about "the circle of life", with them both crying while working on it individually. He said that I.N.A only had one or two temporary vocal recordings from hide with which to finish the song.

Westfall claimed that the liner notes crediting Rich Breen for mixing the track are incorrect and that the mix actually used was done by himself. Despite him being told that it would be, it was not corrected in later pressings. It was finally corrected in the "Repsycle Ver." of Ja, Zoo, which was released in 2024.

== Reception and legacy ==
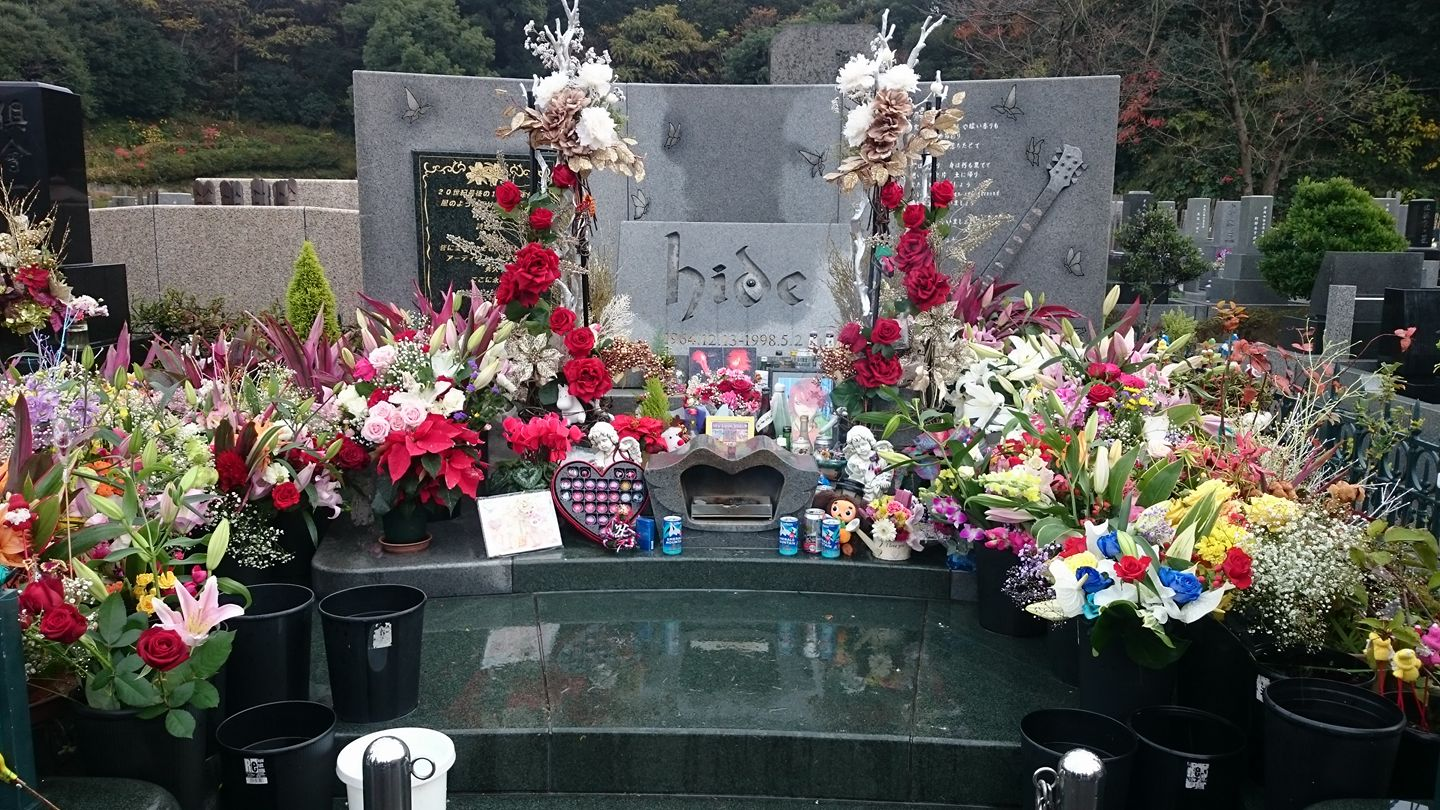
Lyrics to "Hurry Go Round" are engraved on hide's tombstone, seen on the right, partially obscured by flowers just above a carving of one of his guitars.

"Hurry Go Round" reached number 2 on the Oricon Singles Chart. By the end of the year it had sold 567,890 copies and was the 41st best-selling single of 1998. The single was certified platinum by the RIAJ in November 1998, and double platinum in February 2020 for sales over 500,000.

Hiroko Goto of Real Sound wrote that, with its bouncy tempo and light, airy melody, "Hurry Go Round" stands out as one of the more pop-oriented songs in hide's catalogue, and suggested this might be because the vocals are soft and gentle due to being taken from a demo. She also noted the lyrics about a recurring cycle to be worthy of special attention, as she felt they were a message from the deceased hide.

Some of the lyrics to the song are engraved on hide's tombstone. "Hurry Go Round" was chosen as the title for a May 26, 2018, documentary film about hide. Its ending theme is a new version of the song titled "Hurry Go Round (hide Vocal Take 2)". This version of the song has only hide's vocals and Pata's acoustic guitar, and is included on the June 6, 2018, tribute album Tribute Impulse.

The 251st chapter of the manga series Rurouni Kenshin, published in September 1999, is titled "Hurry Go Round" after the song. The author, Nobuhiro Watsuki, was listening to the song a lot while drawing the final arc of the series and felt it fitted well with the characters Yukishiro Enishi and Hitokiri Battōsai, and referred to it as the Jinchū arc's theme song.

== Track listing ==
All songs are written by hide.

No.	Title	Length
1.	"Hurry Go Round"	5:04
2.	"Hurry Go Round (Voiceless Version)"	5:01

== Personnel ==
- hide – vocals
- I.N.A. – co-producer, programming, recording engineer, additional arrangement
- Joe – drums
- Chirolyn – bass guitar
- Kiyoshi – electric guitar
- Pata – acoustic guitar
- Gotchin – acoustic guitar
- Neko Saito – strings arrangement
- Neko Saito Group – strings
- Rich Breen – mixing engineer (at Ocean Way) (removed from the credits on the 2024 Repsycle Ver.)
- Eric Westfall – recording engineer, mixing engineer (mixing credit added to the 2024 Repsycle Ver.)
- Hiroshi Nemoto – assistant engineer (Hitokuchizaka-Studio)
- Masami Konagaya – assistant engineer (Hitokuchizaka-Studio)

Personnel per Ja, Zoo liner notes.

== Cover versions ==
The song was covered by Scarlett for Crush! 3 - 90's V-Rock Best Hit Cover Love Songs-, which was released on June 27, 2012, and features newer visual kei bands covering love songs by visual kei artists of the 1990s. It was covered by Cell for the Tribute II -Visual Spirits- tribute album and by Hero for Tribute III -Visual Spirits-, both albums released on July 3, 2013. Shion recorded a version for Tribute VI -Female Spirits-, released on December 18, 2013.
