= Hi-Ho/Good Bye =

"Hi-Ho"/"Good Bye"

Single by hide

from the album Psyence
- Released: December 18, 1996
- Genre: Alternative rock; ska
- Label: MCA Victor
- Songwriter: hide

Hide singles chronology
"Beauty & Stupid" (1996)	"Hi-Ho" / "Good Bye" (1996)	"Rocket Dive" (1998)

"Hi-Ho"/"Good Bye" is the seventh and only double A-side single by Japanese musician hide, released on December 18, 1996. It reached number 8 on the Oricon chart.

The music for "Beauty & Stupid Tokyo Ska Version" is performed by Tokyo Ska Paradise Orchestra. Track 3 is a live version of "Pose" recorded at Yoyogi National Gymnasium on October 20, 1996, the entire concert was released as the live album Psyence a Go Go in 2008. On August 4, 2010, the single was re-released as part of the second releases in "The Devolution Project", which was a release of hide's original eleven singles on picture disc vinyl.

== Track listing ==
All songs written by hide.

No.	Title	Length
1.	"Hi-Ho"	5:46
2.	"Beauty & Stupid Tokyo Ska Version"	4:04
3.	"Pose (Live at Yoyogi on Oct.20.1996)"	5:00
4.	"Good Bye"	3:59

== Personnel ==
- hide – vocals, guitar, bass, arranger, producer
- Satoshi "Joe" Miyawaki (ZIGGY) – drums on "Hi-Ho"
- Eiki "Yana" Yanagita (ZEPPET STORE) – drums on "Good Bye"

Personnel per Psyence liner notes.

== Cover versions ==
Yoshiki, hide's former X Japan bandmate, covered "Good Bye" on the 1999 hide tribute album Tribute Spirits. Jamosa covered it for Tribute VI -Female Spirits-, while Zeppet Store recorded a version for Tribute VII -Rock Spirits-. Both albums were released on December 18, 2013. "Good Bye" was covered by Cocco for the June 6, 2018 Tribute Impulse album.
