= Tell Me (hide song) =

1994 single by hide

Single by hide

from the album Hide Your Face
- Released: March 24, 1994
- Genre: Alternative rock
- Label: MCA Victor
- Songwriter: hide

Hide singles chronology
"Dice" (1994)	"Tell Me" (1994)	"Misery" (1996)

"Tell Me"

Single by hide with Spread Beaver
- Released: January 19, 2000
- Genre: Alternative rock
- Label: Universal Victor
- Songwriter: hide

Hide with Spread Beaver singles chronology
"Hurry Go Round" (1998)	"Tell Me" (2000)	"In Motion" (2002)

"Tell Me" is the fourth single by Japanese musician hide, released on March 24, 1994. It reached number 4 on the Oricon Singles Chart. The B-side "Scanner (Ai no Duet?)" is a different version of "Scanner" from Hide Your Face, as it features vocals by Ryuichi from Luna Sea. The single was certified Gold by the RIAJ in April 1994, and Double Platinum in February 2020 for sales over 500,000.

A re-recording of "Tell Me" that features Spread Beaver playing, was released on January 19, 2000, under the hide with Spread Beaver name. This version reached number 2 on the Oricon chart and was certified Gold by the RIAJ in January 2000 for sales over 200,000.

The original version was re-released on December 12, 2007, with a new cover. On April 28, 2010, it was re-released again as part of the first releases in "The Devolution Project", which was a release of hide's original eleven singles on picture disc vinyl.

== Track listing ==
All songs written by hide.
1994 original release

No.	Title	Length
1.	"Tell Me"	4:44
2.	"Scanner (Ai no Duet?) (SCANNER 愛のデュエット？; Scanner: Duet of Love?)"	3:26
3.	"Tell Me (Original TV Mix)"	4:48

2000 re-recording

No.	Title	Length
1.	"Tell Me"	4:50
2.	"Pink Spider (Live at Yokohama on Nov.18.1998)"	4:31
3.	"Tell Me (Voiceless Version)"	4:59

== Personnel ==
1994 recording

- hide – vocals, guitar, producer, arranger
- Kazuhiko Inada – co-producer and synthesizer programming
- Mitsuko Akai – drums on "Tell Me"
- Ryuichi – vocals on "Scanner"

Personnel for 1994 single per its liner notes.

2000 recording

- hide – vocals, guitar, producer
- I.N.A. – co-producer, arranger, programming and editing
- Kiyoshi – guitar
- Kaz – guitar
- Chirolyn – bass
- Joe – drums
- D.I.E. – keyboards

Personnel for 2000 single per its liner notes.

== Cover versions ==
"Tell Me" and "Scanner" were covered by Kyo and Tetsu (both currently of D'erlanger, but previously in hide's old band Saver Tiger) and Luna Sea on the 1999 hide tribute album Tribute Spirits. Luna Sea performed their cover live at the hide memorial summit on May 4, 2008, and "Tell Me" was covered live by heidi. earlier that same day. A studio version of "Tell Me" by heidi. appears on the Tribute II -Visual Spirits- album, which was released on July 3, 2013. For Tribute VI -Female Spirits-, released on December 18, 2013, "Tell Me" was covered by Thelma Aoyama. The song was covered by Granrodeo for the June 6, 2018 Tribute Impulse album.
