= Hide Our Psychommunity =

Live album by hide
- Released: April 23, 2008
- Recorded: August 10, 1994 at Yokohama Arena
- Genre: Alternative rock, hard rock
- Length: 64:58 (Disc 1); 62:02 (Disc 2)
- Label: Universal

hide live chronology
Psyence a Go Go (2008)	Hide Our Psychommunity (2008)

Hide Our Psychommunity is a live album by hide, released on April 23, 2008. It contains almost all of his August 10, 1994 Yokohama Arena concert (Both covers of "20th Century Boy" by T.Rex and "Light My Fire" by The Doors are cut), from his 1994 tour of the same name. The album reached number 25 on the Oricon chart.

== Track listing ==
Disc one
No.	Title	Length
1.	"Opening (S.E.)"
2.	"Doubt"
3.	"Scanner"
4.	"Oblaat"
5.	"New Rose" (The Damned cover)
6.	"Chirolyn's Room"
7.	"21 Seiki no Seishinijousha ~Blue Sky Complex~ 21 Seiki no Seishinijousha" (21世紀の精神異常者〜BLUE SKY COMPLEX〜21世紀の精神異常者)
8.	"Ran's Room"
9.	"Digger's Job ~ Frozen Bug '93"
10.	"Honey Blade"
11.	"Joe's Room"
12.	"50% & 50%"

Disc two
No.	Title	Length
1.	"D.I.E.'s Room ~ Eyes Love You (Death Hollywood Version)"
2.	"Eyes Love You"
3.	"D.O.D. (Drink Or Die)"
4.	"Tell Me"
5.	"50% & 50% (Unplugged)"
6.	"Honey Blade (Unplugged)"
7.	"Celebration" (X Japan cover)
8.	"Dice"
9.	"Psychommunity Exit"
10.	"A Story (S.E.)"
