= Psyence a Go Go =

Live album by hide
- Released: March 19, 2008
- Recorded: October 20, 1996 at Yoyogi National Gymnasium
- Genre: Alternative rock, hard rock
- Length: 49:12 (disc one); 76:50 (disc two); 55:31 (disc three)
- Label: Universal

hide live chronology
Psyence a Go Go (2008)	Hide Our Psychommunity (2008)

Psyence a Go Go is a live album by hide, released on March 19, 2008. It contains a full-length concert, from his 1996 tour of the same name, recorded on October 20, 1996, at the Yoyogi National Gymnasium. The album reached number 18 on the Oricon chart.

== Track listing ==
Disc one
No.	Title	Length
1.	"Psyence (S.E.)"
2.	"Pose"
3.	"Bacteria"
4.	"Damage"
5.	"Beauty & Stupid"
6.	"Genkai Haretsu" (限界破裂)
7.	"Cafe Le Psyence"
8.	"Flame"

Disc two
No.	Title	Length
1.	"Hi-Ho ~ Drum Solo ~ Natural Born Onanist (D.I.E. Solo) ~ Hi-Ho"
2.	"LEMONed I Scream"
3.	"Lassie"
4.	"Kimi wa Kawattchimatta (Chirolyn Solo)"
5.	"Misery"
6.	"Tell Me"
7.	"Oedo Cowboys"

Disc three
No.	Title	Length
1.	"Erase"
2.	"Doubt"
3.	"Oblaat"
4.	"D.O.D. (Drink or Die)"
5.	"Dice"
6.	"Good Bye"
7.	"Good Bye (S.E.)"
