= Zeppet Store =

Japanese alternative rock band

- Origin: Japan
- Genres: Alternative rock
- Years active: 1989–2005, 2007, 2011–present
- Labels: Under Flower, Bounce, LEMONed/MCA Victor, Scarlet, Georide, Delights, Solid
- Members: Seizi Kimura; Yuichi Nakamura; Kenji Akabane; Makoto Gomi
- Past members: Eiki Yanagita
- Website: http://www.zeppetstore.jp/

Zeppet Store (stylized as ZEPPET STORE) is a Japanese alternative rock band, formed in 1989. They became known after hide signed them to his record label LEMONed in 1996. The band disbanded in 2005, before reuniting in 2011.

== History ==
Zeppet Store formed in 1989 as a three piece by vocalist and rhythm guitarist Seizi Kimura, lead guitarist Makoto Gomi, and bassist Yuichi Nakamura. Drummer Eiki "Yana" Yanagita joined soon after. In 1996, the band signed to the label LEMONed owned by X Japan guitarist hide and released 716. The album received an American release and the group went on the USA Tour '96. Gomi left in 1997 as he did not like being signed to a major label. Guitarist Kenji Akabane did not join until 1998. Zeppet Store disbanded on August 14, 2005.

On June 2, 2007, the band sans Akabane reunited with Gomi for a one-night only performance at the 15th anniversary event of the Under Flower Record label. In 2011, Zeppet Store fully restarted activities, with both Akabane and Gomi, to record a new single with the proceeds going to aid the victims of the Tōhoku earthquake and tsunami. The song, called "Smile", was completed on July 16 and released on iTunes on August 13. While a physical CD single of the song, coupled with the B-side "If You Want Me", was given a limited release on September 3.

The quintet performed at hide Film Alive ~hide Memorial Day 2012~ on May 2, 2012. They released their tenth studio album Shape 5 on December 13, hide's birthday, and went on the Zeppet Store Tour "Come and Go" in January 2013. Zeppet Store contributed a cover of hide's song "Good Bye" to December 2013's Tribute VII -Rock Spirits-. The band released their eleventh album, Spice, on January 15, 2014 and began a live tour in March.

In 2019, Zeppet Store celebrated their 30th anniversary in several ways. Two albums containing new recordings of old songs were released on July 16, 2019. The songs on Transformed were recorded in different music genres, while those on Removed feature acoustic arrangements. Their nationwide 30th anniversary tour titled Transmoved took place from September 21 to November 1, with some of the dates being acoustic.

Drummer Yanagita announced he would retire from live performances after their December 26, 2020 concert due to being diagnosed with focal dystonia in the summer, but remain a member of Zeppet Store. He took on the position of "rhythm tracker" and appeared alongside their support drummer Yosuke "Haze" Omiya at shows by playing electric drum pads and other instruments. In 2024, the band celebrated their 35th anniversary with a tour and the album 35. Originally released in a made-to-order box set at the end of the year, the album later received a digital release on March 25, 2025. On July 1, Yanagita officially departed Zeppet Store. He explained that he made the decision after realizing he was losing motivation and feeling disheartened over his role in the band.

== Members ==
Current members

- Seizi Kimura (木村世治) – lead vocals, guitar (1989–2005, 2007, 2011–present)
- Yuichi Nakamura (中村雄一) – bass (1989–2005, 2007, 2011–present)
- Kenji Akabane (赤羽根謙二) – guitar (1998–2005, 2011–present)
- Makoto Gomi (五味 誠) – guitar (1989–1997, 2007, 2011–present)

Former members

- Eiki "Yana" Yanagita (柳田英輝) – drums (1989–2005, 2007, 2011–2025)

== Discography ==
=== Studio albums ===
- Swing, Slide, Sandpit (June 21, 1994)
- 716 (May 7, 1996)
- Cue (April 23, 1997), Oricon Albums Chart Peak Position: No. 67
- Bridge (February 24, 1999) No. 16
- Clutch (October 8, 1999) No. 8
- Gooseflesh (September 6, 2000) No. 22
- Dino (November 7, 2001) No. 70
- Slick (June 11, 2003) No. 85
- Black Berry Bed (September 22, 2004) No. 219
- Shape 5 (December 13, 2012) No. 151
- Spice (January 15, 2014) No. 181
- Reverb (September 21, 2016)
- 35 (November 2024, made-to-order; March 25, 2025, digital)

=== Other albums ===
- Singles and Rare 1994-2001 (March 27, 2002, compilation album)
- 4 (October 26, 2005, live album)
- Come and Go -Live 2013- (November 5, 2014, live CD & DVD)
- 716 -Special Edition- (July 16, 2016) No. 241
- Open the Secret Box (August 31, 2016, 4 CD & 1 DVD box set)
- Transformed (July 16, 2019, self-cover album)
- Removed (July 16, 2019, self-cover album)
- The Best of Tour "Transmoved" (December 1, 2019, live album)

=== Singles ===
- "Koe" (September 4, 1996), Oricon Singles Chart Peak Position: No. 86
- "To Be Free" (November 21, 1996)
- "Superstition" (February 21, 1997)
- "Don't Ask Me Why" (November 5, 1997)
- "Loop" (June 24, 1998) No. 46
- "Rose" (November 21, 1998) No. 32
- "Motto Motto" (May 19, 1999) No. 30
- "Toku Made" (July 28, 1999) No. 32
- "Emotion" (April 12, 2000) No. 28
- "Distance" (April 26, 2000) No. 35
- "Presence" (July 26, 2000) No. 48
- "Tightrope" (June 27, 2001) No. 60
- "Seek Out" (October 6, 2001) No. 92
- "Smile" (August 13, 2011, digital download; September 3, 2011, CD)
- "Spy" (October 6, 2013)
- "Angel Will Come (2019 Re:Works)" (2019, free digital download)

=== Home videos ===
- hide presents MIX LEMONed JELLY (VHS: 1997, DVD: July 20, 2003)
  - Zeppet Store performs "Flake", Kimura later performs "Angel Will Come" with D.I.E. from hide with Spread Beaver, recorded on August 26, 1997)
- Slice -Official Bootleg- (December 10, 2003)
- 4 (June 23, 2006)
- Come and Go -Live 2013- (July 17, 2013, live DVD & CD)
- Tour Transmoved Final at Shimokitazawa Garden (December 20, 2019)
- Recollect 2015 Official Bootleg DVD (April 27, 2020)
- To Our Future (April 2021, 2 live DVDs & 1 CD)

=== Compilations ===
- LEMONed (May 22, 1996)
- Tribute Spirits (May 1, 1999, cover of hide's "Flame")
- Cafe Le PSYENCE -hide LEMONed Compilation- (May 16, 2002)
- Tribute VII -Rock Spirits- (December 18, 2013, cover of hide's "Good Bye")
