= The Underneath (band) =

Japanese visual kei rock band

- Also known as: Transtic Nerve
- Origin: Hyogo, Japan
- Genres: Hard rock; alternative rock; heavy metal; hardcore punk
- Years active: 1995–2007, 2014 (as Transtic Nerve); 2007–2010 (as The Underneath)
- Labels: Lemoned, Limited/Sonic Strider, Unlimited/Massive, Master Tune, Stirring/Def Spiral (JP); JShock (US)
- Spinoffs: Defspiral
- Past members: Taka; Tal; Masato; Ryo; Masaki

The Underneath, formerly known as Transtic Nerve, was a Japanese visual kei rock band formed in 1995. The band released four full-length records as Transtic Nerve and two full-length records as The Underneath. As Transtic Nerve, the band played more straightforward rock styled music, but in 2007 shifted to a heavier and darker style upon transforming to The Underneath. In 2010, the group disbanded and reformed (without second guitarist Tal) under the name Defspiral.

== History ==
Transtic Nerve was formed in November 1995 with the lineup of Tal on guitar, Ryo on bass and Masaki on drums. The band later recruited Taka as vocalist and Masato as second guitarist. The following August, Transtic Nerve released their debut album, Transtic Vision.

In 1998, the band was noticed by famed guitarist hide (formerly of X Japan) and signed to his label, Lemoned. However, due to hide's death soon after, the band was let go without having released anything on the label. The next year, Transtic Nerve released their first single, "Shindou", and their first major label album, Cell Flash, on Unlimited Records in July 1999.

In 2000, the band released two more singles, "Into Yourself" and "Binetsu", both accompanied by lengthy tours spanning most of the year. After touring, the band released another single, "Manazahi no Mukou e", followed by an album, Recall, in March 2001. After touring in support of Recall, the band released another single, "Manatsu no Yoru no Highway Star" in late 2001. Between 2002 and 2004, the band saw very few releases, with only one original studio album, Raise a Flag in 2004. Following their 2004 release, the band transitioned into a new style with more metal influence, and in 2005 Transtic Nerve released an EP, Hole in the Wall, demonstrating the new direction.

After a long pause in activity, Transtic Nerve resurfaced in 2007 with the announcement of a new band identity — the Underneath. The band saw no lineup change, but a deep stylistic change, moving to a heavier and darker style of music. The band's debut would be the Taste of Chaos 2008 tour across the United States, being one of the three Japanese rock bands featured on the years' lineup (the others being D'espairsRay and Mucc). Without any releases or concerts in their home country, the band performed a lengthy American tour. The Underneath eventually announced their first album, Moon Flower, to be released in March 2008, first in the United States on the newly formed JShock label, partly founded by Yoshiki of X Japan.

After the completion of the Taste of Chaos tour, the band performed for the first time in Japan at the hide memorial summit. There, they played on the second day of the festival, alongside fellow Taste of Chaos bands D'espairsRay and Mucc, and others including X Japan, Luna Sea and Dir En Grey. The Underneath's first headlining performance in Japan took place on June 13, 2008, at Shibuya O-West.

The band played along with fellow Japanese groups MarBell and Daizystripper at Otakon 2008, on August 10, 2008, in Baltimore, MD. In November 2009, they released their second album, entitled Us. in Japan.

The Underneath announced that they would disband on May 3, 2010. They released one last single titled "Diamond" on March 17, and had a farewell tour called Last Live 2010 "Last Scene". Every member, sans second guitarist Tal, then formed the band Defspiral.

All five members held a 15th anniversary concert as Transtic Nerve at Akasaka Blitz on December 28, 2014. They also sold a single featuring the new song "Never End" at the concert.

== Members ==
- Taka – vocals
- Tal – guitar
- Masato – guitar
- Ryo – bass
- Masaki – drums

== Discography ==
=== As Transtic Nerve ===
Studio albums

- Transonic Vision (1997)
- Shell (1998) – Limited/Sonic Strider
- Cell Flash (セルフラッシュ; 1999) – Unlimited/Massive
- Recall (2001) – Unlimited/Massive
- Raise a Flag (2004) – Master Tune

Extended plays

- Metabolism – Master Tune
- Metabolism No. 2 (2002) – Master Tune
- Metabolism No. 3 (2003) – Master Tune
- Hole in the Wall (2005) – Master Tune

Other albums

- The Moment of Metabolism (2002, live album) – Master Tune
- Recycled (2004, remix album)
- Recycled:2 (2004, remix album)
- Transtic Nerve Debut 15th Anniversary Live 2014 "Never End" Live CD (2015, live album)

Singles

- "Shindou" (振動; 1999)
- "Wake Up Your Mind's "Jesus" (1999)
- "Overhead Run" (1999)
- "Into Yourself" (2000)
- "Binetsu" (微熱; 2000)
- "Manazashi no Mukou e" (マナザシノムコウヘ; 2001)
- "Manatsu no Yoru no Highway Star" (真夏の夜のハイウェイスター; 2001)
- "Never End" (2014)

=== As The Underneath ===
Studio albums

- Moon Flower (2008) – JShock (US), Stirring/Def Spiral (JP)
- Us. (2009)

Singles

- "Diamond" (2010)
