= Zilch (band) =

American rock band (1996–2002)

- The 2001 tour lineup

Background information
- Origin: Gardena, California, U.S.
- Genres: Industrial rock; alternative metal
- Years active: 1996–2002
- Labels: Cutting Edge, Rhythm Republic
- Past members: Ray McVeigh; Paul Raven; Joey Castillo; I.N.A. hide

Zilch (stylized as zilch or 零) was a rock supergroup that was formed in 1996 by Hideto "hide" Matsumoto (X Japan), Ray McVeigh (formerly of The Professionals), Paul Raven (Killing Joke), Joey Castillo (Danzig and Queens of the Stone Age), and Kazuhiko "I.N.A." Inada (hide with Spread Beaver).

Before the release of their first album, 3.2.1., the group had already faced a major setback, as frontman hide died in May 1998. The band continued to perform live with the help of several guest musicians and released a remix album, Bastard Eyes, based on their debut. They went on to release another studio album, SkyJin, and two singles, "Mimizuzero" and "Charlie's Children."

Zilch disbanded in 2002, and Raven died in 2007.

== Members ==
- Hideto "hide" Matsumoto – guitar, lead vocals
- Ray McVeigh – guitar, co-lead vocals
- Paul Raven – bass, backing vocals
- Joey Castillo – drums
- I.N.A. – programming

Guest musicians

- Ian Astbury – vocals
- Jaz Coleman – vocals
- James Hall – vocals
- MC Shabba D – rap
- Ol' Dirty Bastard – rap
- Sen Dog – rap
- Mellow Man Ace – rap
- Kool Keith – rap
- Steve Jones – guitar
- Jerry Cantrell – guitar
- Geordie Walker – guitar
- Dave Kushner – guitar
- Brian Robertson – guitar
- Todd Youth – guitars
- J – bass
- Duff McKagan – bass
- Sean Yseult – bass
- Scott Garrett – drums
- Matt Walker – drums
- Chris Vrenna – drums
- Charlie Clouser – synth, programming
- DJ Swamp – DJ
- Shaun Ryder – singer – vocals
- Hisashi Imai – guitar
- Maki Fuji – guitar
- Sugizo – guitar
- Yvette Lera – vocals

== Discography ==
- 3.2.1. (July 23, 1998), Oricon peak position: No. 2
- Bastard Eyes (March 3, 1999, remix album) No. 5
- "Mimizuzero" (February 28, 2001) No. 37
- "Charlie's Children" (June 27, 2001) No. 37
- Skyjin (September 27, 2001) No. 33

Appears on

- Heavy Metal 2000 (April 18, 2000, "Inside the Pervert Mound")
- Cafe Le Psyence -hide Lemoned Compilation- (May 16, 2002, "Electric Cucumber")
- Catacombs (October 3, 2007, "Psyche")
