= Vandalism (disambiguation) =

Vandalism is an action involving deliberate destruction of or damage to public or private property.

Vandalism or Vandalize may also refer to:

- Property damage
- Vandalism on Wikipedia, a form of malicious editing of Wikipedia
- Taxonomic vandalism, the publishing of unfounded taxonomic names
- Interactional vandalism, a concept in sociology
- Vandalism (duo), an Australian music group
- "Vandalism" (The Office), a 2013 episode
- Vandalism (album), a 2011 album by Deluhi
- "Vandalism" (featuring Amba Shepherd), a song from the 2011 EP Spitfire by Porter Robinson
- Vandalize (album), a 2009 studio album by Alice Nine
- "Vandalize", a song by One Ok Rock and the end credits theme of the 2022 video game Sonic Frontiers

== See also ==
- Vandalism of art
- Library-book vandalism
- The Vandalist, a 2024 studio album by Noga Erez
