= Dice (hide song) =

Single by hide

from the album Hide Your Face
- Released: January 21, 1994
- Genre: Hard rock
- Label: MCA Victor
- Songwriter: hide

Hide singles chronology
"50% & 50%" (1993)	"Dice" (1994)	"Tell Me" (1994)

"Dice" is the third single by Japanese musician hide, released on January 21, 1994. It reached number 6 on the Oricon chart. The B-side is a remix of his previous single "Eyes Love You". The single was certified Gold by the RIAJ in February 1994, and Platinum in February 2020 for sales over 250,000.

The single was re-released on December 12, 2007, with a new cover. On April 28, 2010, it was re-released again as part of the first releases in "The Devolution Project", which was a release of hide's original eleven singles on picture disc vinyl.

== Track listing ==
No.	Title	Lyrics	Music	Length
1.	"Dice"	hide	hide	3:03
2.	"Eyes Love You (Mad Translator Mix)" (Remixed by Soichi Terada)	Yukinojo Mori	hide	6:30

== Personnel ==
- hide – vocals, guitar
- T.M. Stevens – bass
- Terry Bozzio – drums

Personnel for "Dice" per Hide Your Face liner notes.

== Cover versions ==
"Dice" was covered live by Mucc, with Tal from the Underneath, at the hide memorial summit on May 4, 2008. The title track was covered by Matenrou Opera on the Tribute II -Visual Spirits- tribute album and by Screw on Tribute III -Visual Spirits-, both albums were released on July 3, 2013. For Tribute VII -Rock Spirits-, released on December 18, 2013, it was covered by Kinniku Shōjo Tai.
