= Hide Your Face =

Studio album by hide
- Released: February 23, 1994
- Recorded: 1993
- Genres: Alternative rock, hard rock
- Length: 68:18
- Label: MCA Victor
- Producer: hide

Hide chronology
Hide Your Face (1994)	Psyence (1996)

Singles from Hide Your Face
- 1. "Eyes Love You" Released: August 5, 1993; 2. "50% & 50%" Released: August 5, 1993; 3. "Dice" Released: January 21, 1994; 4. "Tell Me" Released: March 24, 1994

Hide Your Face is the debut album by Japanese musician hide, released on February 23, 1994. It reached number 1 on the Oricon Albums Chart and was certified Double Platinum by the RIAJ for sales over 500,000 copies. It was named one of the top albums from 1989–1998 in a 2004 issue of the music magazine Band Yarouze.

== Overview ==
hide embarked on a solo career in 1993 due to the downtime in X Japan. Initially wanting to hire several different vocalists because he was unsure of his own voice, he eventually began taking vocal lessons from Toshi's coach and sang the material himself.

The song "Frozen Bug '93 (Diggers Version)" is a remixed version of "Frozen Bug", a song that hide wrote and performed with Luna Sea members J and Inoran, under the band name M*A*S*S, for the 1993 compilation Dance 2 Noise 004. Wanting to contrast something unusual with a pop background, hide hired Yukinojo Mori to pen the lyrics to his first two A-side singles. As a kid, hide was fond of Bow Wow's 1982 album Warning from Stardust, where the A-side songs had lyrics in English and the B-side in Japanese. Liking the Japanese lyrics better, hide only realized Mori was their author afterwards. Together with the music for "Frozen Bug", "Eyes Love You" and "50% & 50%" are the only songs hide released for his solo career that he did not write himself.

The album's cover art features a reproduction of a mask, originally created by H. R. Giger, by Screaming Mad George and Joanne Bloomfield.

Hide Your Face was re-released on the Japan-only format SHM-CD on December 3, 2008.

== Reception ==
Hide Your Face reached number 1 on the Oricon Albums Chart. The 2008 re-release reached number 223. The album was certified Gold by the RIAJ in March 1994, Platinum in January 1995, and Double Platinum in February 2020 for sales over 500,000.

The album was named one of the top albums from 1989–1998 in a 2004 issue of the music magazine Band Yarouze.

== Track listing ==
All tracks are written by hide, except tracks 4 and 15 lyrics by Yukinojo Mori, and track 9 music by M*A*S*S.

No.	Title	Lyrics	Music	Length
1.	"Psychommunity"			4:04
2.	"Dice"			3:03
3.	"Scanner"			3:23
4.	"Eyes Love You (T.T. Version)"	Yukinojo Mori	hide	5:57
5.	"D.O.D. (Drink Or Die)"			2:17
6.	"Crime of Breen St."			1:17
7.	"Doubt (Remix Version)"			4:42
8.	"A Story"			3:13
9.	"Frozen Bug '93 (Diggers Version)"	hide	M*A*S*S	4:44
10.	"T.T. Groove"			0:31
11.	"Blue Sky Complex"			5:35
12.	"Oblaat (Remix Version)"			4:47
13.	"Tell Me"			4:44
14.	"Honey Blade"			4:31
15.	"50% & 50% (Crystal Lake Version)"	Yukinojo Mori	hide	5:33
16.	"Psychommunity Exit"			19:57

== Personnel ==
Main artist

- hide – vocals, guitar, arranger, producer

Musicians and production

- Kazuhiko Inada – co-producer, synthesizer programming
- Terry Bozzio – drums on tracks 2, 4, 10, 11, 14
- Mitsuko Akai – drums on tracks 8, 13
- Junji Ikehata – drums on track 15
- T. M. Stevens – bass on tracks 2, 4, 10, 11, 14
- Michiaki Suzuki – bass on track 12
- Toshihiro Nara – bass on track 15
- Rich Breen – Rhodes on track 6, recording engineer, mixing engineer
- Neil Larson – organ on track 11
- Jerry Hey, Gary E. Grant, William F. Reichenbach – horn on track 11
- Maxine Waters, Julia Waters, Carmen Twillie – chorus on track 11
- Byron Berline – fiddle on track 15
- Tsuneo Tomono – recording engineer, mixing engineer on tracks 6, 10, 15 (band section), 16
- Kazushige Yamazaki – mastering engineer

Personnel per the album's liner notes.

== Cover versions ==
Yoshiki composed a piece based on "Psychommunity Exit" as the intro for the 1999 hide tribute album Tribute Spirits. American bassist T.M. Stevens, who plays on the album, recorded a cover of "Blue Sky Complex" for his 1999 album Radioactive. Nightmare guitarist Hitsuji covered "D.O.D. (Drink Or Die)" for Tribute II -Visual Spirits-, while Dezert covered it for Tribute III -Visual Spirits-. Both albums were released on July 3, 2013. The Cherry Coke$ also recorded a version of the same song for Tribute VII -Rock Spirits-, released on December 18, 2013. "D.O.D. (Drink Or Die)" was covered by Flow firstly at Mixed Lemoned Jelly 2016 in Maihama Amphitheater then recorded the studio version for June 6, 2018 Tribute Impulse album.
