= Matenrou Opera =

Japanese visual kei symphonic metal band

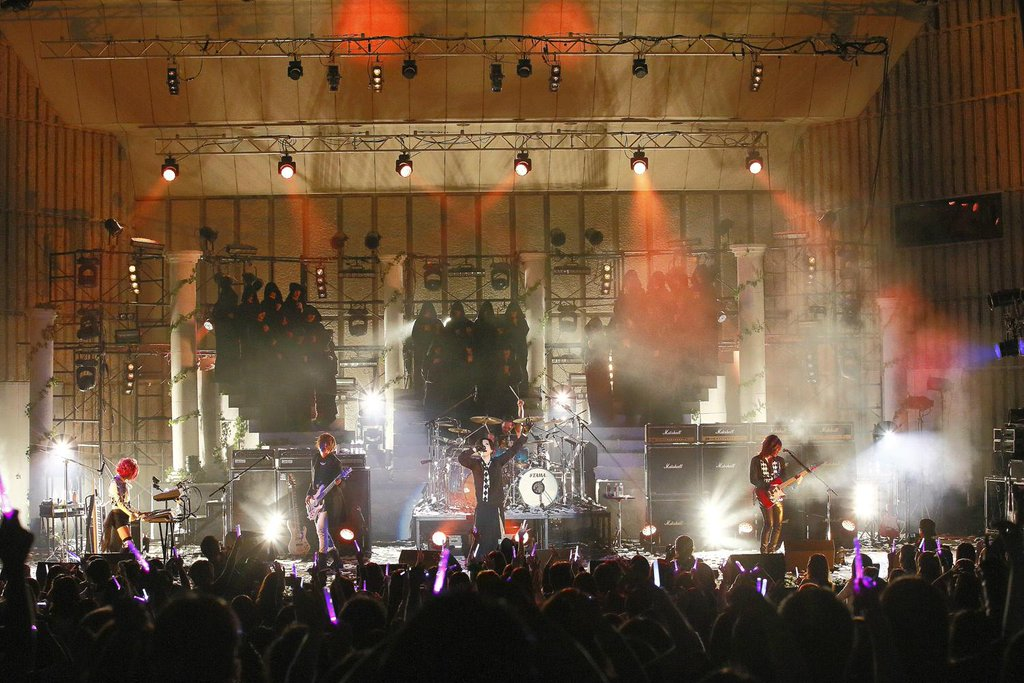
- Matenrou Opera performing at Hibiya Open-Air Concert Hall in November 2015

Background information
- Origin: Japan
- Genres: Symphonic metal; power metal
- Years active: 2006–present
- Labels: Office A to Z; Sherow Artist Society; Warner Music; King/Bellwood; CLJ (EU)
- Members: Sono; Ayame; Yo; Hibiki; Yusuke
- Past members: JaY; Yuu; Anzi; Karen; Mika

Official Matenrou Opera logo

Matenrou Opera (Japanese: 摩天楼オペラ, Hepburn: Matenrō Opera; lit. 'Skyscraper Opera') is a Japanese visual kei symphonic power metal band. It was formed in 2006 by vocalist Sono and drummer Yuu, who were previously in the band Jeniva together.

== History ==
Matenrou Opera was formed in October 2006 by former Jeniva bandmates vocalist Sono and drummer Yuu. The lineup was rounded out by bassist You, former Ancient Myth guitarist Mika, and female keyboardist Karen.Their first single, "Alkaloid Showcase", was released by the Office A to Z label on May 4, 2007, the same day as their first concert; it sold out before the concert began. However, Mika and Karen left the band in November. They were replaced by guitarist Anzi (ex-Masterpiece) and keyboardist Ayame (ex-Ry:dia) in December.

The band joined Kamijo's record label Sherow Artist Society, and released the single "Ruri Iro de Egaku Niji" on March 5, 2008. It reached number 11 on the Oricon Indies Chart; the EP Gilia reached number 7 and was also released in Europe. Matenrou Opera toured through Europe with Versailles from the end of March to the beginning of April 2008.

In late 2009, Matenrou Opera shared a national tour of Japan with Deluhi. Matenrou Opera covered X Japan's song "Kurenai" for the compilation Crush! -90's V-Rock Best Hit Cover Songs-. The album was released on January 26, 2011, and features current visual kei bands covering songs from bands that were important to the '90s visual kei movement. Matenrou Opera also covered hide's song "Dice" for the tribute album Tribute II -Visual Spirits-, released on July 3, 2013. Then, they released Avalon on September 3, 2014.

On May 15, 2016, guitarist Anzi announced that he would leave Matenrou Opera after eight years with the band. His final concert with the band was held in July of the same year in Tokyo, at Tsutaya O-East. Matenrou Opera continued performing with support guitarist JaY, the former guitarist for the band Light Bringer, until it was announced in May 2018 that he would be their new permanent guitarist.

They released Chikyuu on January 20, 2016, and on October 19, 2016, they released Phoenix Rising. They officially released Pantheon -Part 1- on April 12, 2017. Additionally, they released both 摩天楼オペラ 〜BEST & CLIPS〜 and 摩天楼オペラ 〜BEST & REQUEST〜 on October 19, 2016, for a limited time. In 2020, Sono announced the band would be switching from King Records to his self-owned label, amairo records.

In December 2020, Matenrou Opera announced JaY's departure from the band, with their last show with him being livestreamed on December 14. Shortly after, the band began performing with guest guitarist Yusuke Hiraga, formerly of the metalcore band Arise in Stability and of Babymetal's Kami Band. He was officially inducted as a permanent guitarist in May 2022, and contributed to the composition and songwriting for the album Shinjitsu wo Shite Iku Monogatari. Released in June 2022, this was Matenrou Opera's first full-length album as a complete band in three years.

In 2023, the band teamed up with Moi dix Mois, Versailles and D for the four-date Japanese Visual Metal tour between September 22 and October 2. The four bands collaborated on the song "Kyōsōkyoku ~Tanbinaru Kettō~", which was released as a single credited to the JVM Roses Blood Symphony.

== Members ==
Current members

- Sono (苑) – vocals
- Yo (燿) – bass
- Ayame (彩雨) – keyboards
- Hibiki (白石 響) – drums (Hazuki support)
- Yusuke (優介) – guitar

Former members

- Mika (未伽) – guitar (ex. Ancient Myth)
- Karen (華蓮) – keyboards
- Anzi – guitar
- Yuu (悠) – drums
- JaY – guitar (ex. Light Bringer)

Support members

- Leda – guitar (ex. Galneryus, Deluhi)
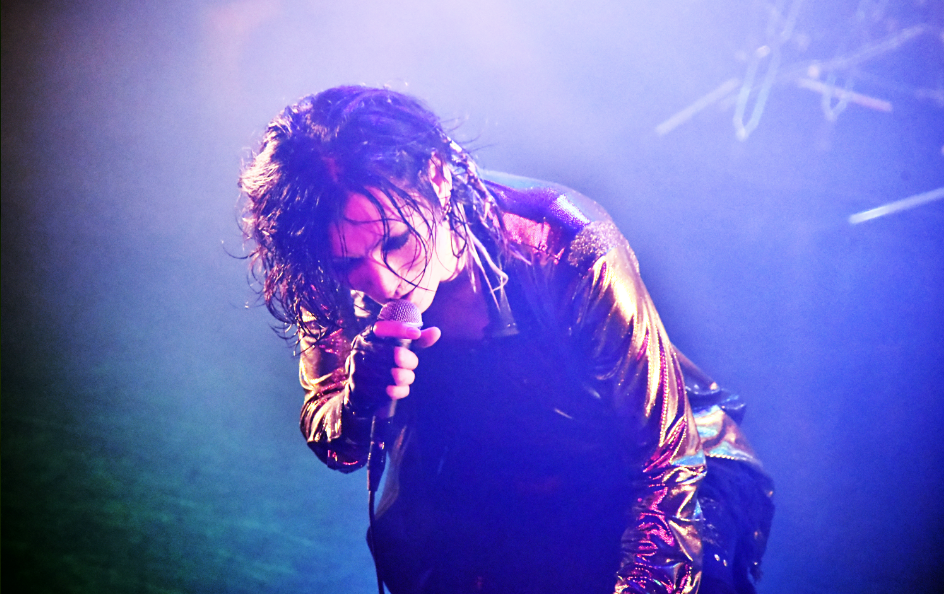
Sono

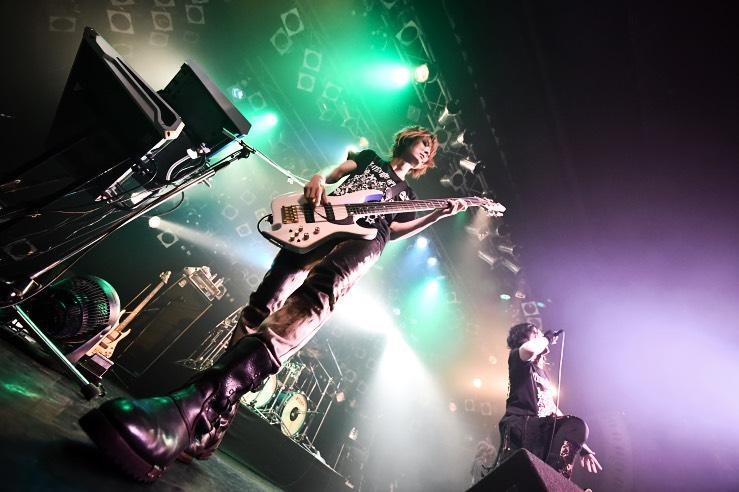
Yo

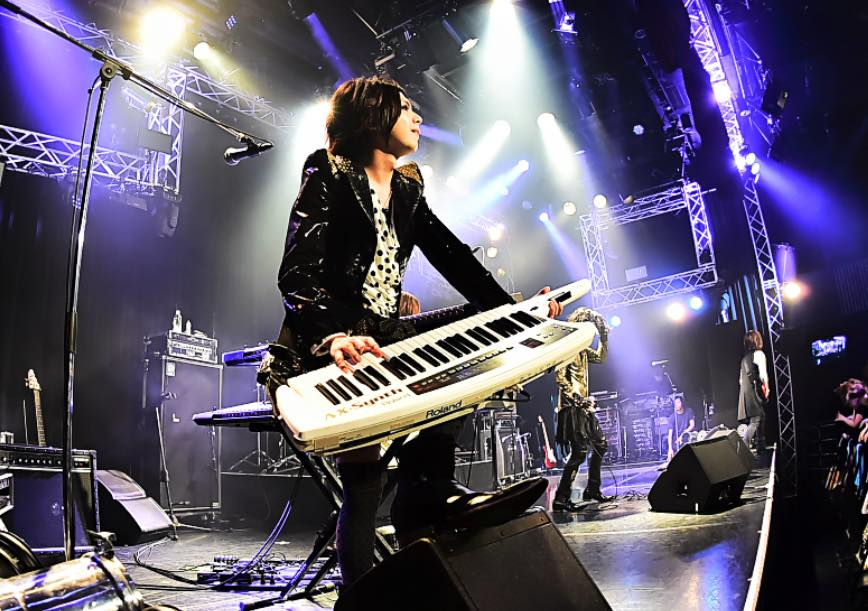
Ayame

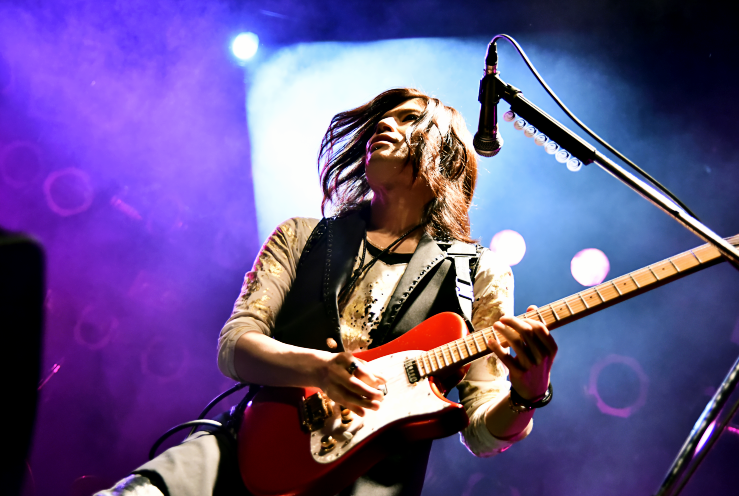
Anzi

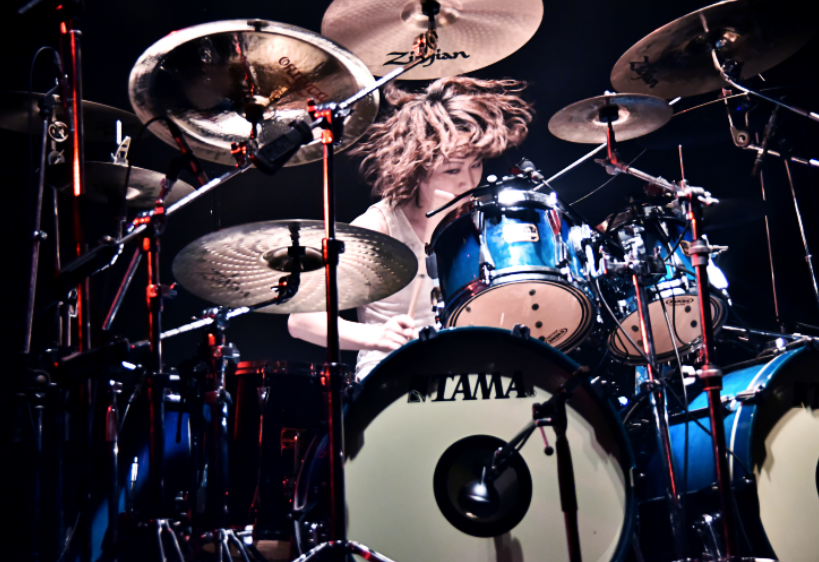
Yuu

== Discography ==
=== Albums & EPs ===
- Gilia (May 14, 2008)
- Anomie (June 24, 2009)
- Abyss (December 22, 2010)
- Justice (March 7, 2012)
- Kassai to Gekijou no Gloria (March 6, 2013)
- Avalon (September 3, 2014)
- Chikyuu (January 20, 2016)
- Phoenix Rising (October 19, 2016)
- Pantheon -Part 1- (April 12, 2017)
- Pantheon -Part 2- (November 15, 2017)
- Human Dignity (February 27, 2019)
- Chronos (April 22, 2020)
- Shinjitsu wo Shitteiku Monogatari (June 22, 2022)
- Evil (December 12, 2023)
- Mutsu no Hana (December 18, 2024)
- Cinematographe (June 17, 2026)

=== Singles ===
- Alkaloid Showcase (May 4, 2007)
- Sara (live-distributed only, October 30, 2007)
- Ruri Iro de Egaku Niji (March 5, 2008)
- Spectacular (September 24, 2008)
- Last Scene (December 17, 2008)
- Acedia (March 25, 2009)
- Eternal Symphony (live-distributed only, July 23, 2009)
- Murder Scope (December 16, 2009)
- R (live-distributed only, February 24, 2010)
- Genesis/R (May 17, 2010)
- Helios (July 6, 2011)
- Otoshiana no Soko wa Konna Sekai (October 19, 2011)
- Gloria (October 3, 2012)
- Innovational Symphonia (December 5, 2012)
- Orb (December 4, 2013)
- Tonari ni Suwaru Taiyou (July 23, 2014)
- Chimeishou (October 29, 2014)
- Ether (April 8, 2015)
- Kimi to Miru Kaze no Yukue (June 18, 2015)
- Aoku Toumei na Kono Sinpi no Umi e (July 20, 2015)
- Tataeyou Hahanaru Chi de (August 21, 2015)
- Burning Soul (October 21, 2015)
- Honoo no Hito (March 9, 2016)
- Shine On (December 23, 2016)
- Warrior (August 30, 2017)
- Invisible Chaos (June 13, 2018)
- Hakanaku Kieru Ai no Sanka (February 17, 2021)
- Owaranu Namida no Umi de (August 25, 2021)
- Suigyoku no Waltz (live-distributed only, May 4, 2023)
- Yami wo Hamu (initially live distributed, subsequently made available for streaming on June 5, 2024 1) May 4, 2024
- Yoake wa Yuki to Tomoni (June 19, 2024)
- AGONY (August 15, 2025)
- Embryo (December 29, 2025)

=== Live ===
- "Dawn of Anomie in Akasaka Blitz" (Nov 26, 2009)
- "Emergence from Cocoon -Tour Final Live Film- "Birth of Genesis" (September 1, 2010)
- "Emergence from Cocoon -Tour Document Film-" (September 1, 2010)
- "-1214- at Shibuya AX (March 03, 2011)
- "Gloria Tour -Grand Finale- Live Film in Zepp Tokyo" (September 4, 2013)
- "Avalon Tour Finale Live Film in Hibiya Dai Ongaku Dou" (February 18, 2015)
- "Chikyuu Tour Finale Live Film in Ex Theater Roppongi" (February 18, 2015)

=== Other ===
- "Coupling Collection 08-09" (October 28, 2009)
- "Indies Best Collection" (November 24, 2010)
- Before Justice (Limited rental edition, February 22, 2012)
- Kassai to Gekijou no Gloria (Limited rental edition, February 13, 2013)
- Best & Clips (October 19, 2016)
- Best & Request (October 19, 2016)
