= 9Goats Black Out =

Japanese visual kei rock band

- Origin: Niigata, Niigata, Japan
- Genres: Indie rock; shoegazing; dream pop
- Years active: 2007–2013, 2027
- Labels: Dalli, CLJ Records (EU)
- Past members: Ryo; Uta; Hati
- Website: 9goats.net/top.html

9Goats Black Out (stylized as 9GOATS BLACK OUT) was a Japanese visual kei rock band formed in 2007. The band was signed with the independent label Dalli.

== History ==
=== Formation and early years (2007–2010) ===
The band was formed in 2007. After the breakup of the band Gullet in 2004, Ryo focused on his design work by removing himself from music activities for three years. Without any expectation of making a new band, guitarist Uta and bassist Hati asked him to work with them. In the first interview with the band on JaME, Hati explains the beginning of the band as follows:

"We knew that Ryo did jacket designs and art work, and we thought his designs were very cool. So we asked him to design our album jacket, which was really the beginning of our communication with him. We didn't think about working together with him in a band at that time. After that our band disbanded, and we came to Tokyo saying 'we'll do a band in Tokyo.'"

Upon Ryo's acceptance, the band began working together in Tokyo. In December 2007 they created the independent record label Dalli and started their official website. They finished recording their first album, Devils in Bedside. Due to the increasing number of orders, additional copies were made of the album after its release. In September of that year, the band released their first single "Sleeping Beauty", which reached 161 on the Oricon singles chart. They then played two more individual concerts and begin their tour in Autumn. In 2008 they performed with the band Sugar and released the mini-album Black Rain. 9Goats Black Out made two more nationwide tours performing in Osaka, Nagoya, and Tokyo under the names of "Howlingbird at the Hell" and "Bright Garden", the last one giving its name to their next release, a DVD. One year later, they began recording their first full album, Tanatos (as an allusion to death); which was later released in March. In 2009 they played a coupling live with Deathgaze.

In Spring of 2010, the band officially announced that they were on hiatus after their support drummer, Aki, left the band. The band continued performing at various concerts with different bands under the name "Baphomet", playing 9Goats Black Out songs with the addition of Hiroshi Sasabuchi (ex-Plastic Tree, Cuckoo) on drums.

=== Return from hiatus and disbandment (2011–2013) ===
January 2011 marked the return of the band with a new tour titled "Melancholy Pool". By the end of April, they started a coupling tour "Inu no Atama to Kuroyagi Suupu" (Dog Head's and Black Goat's Soup) with the hard rock band Inugami Circus-dan. In the middle of the same year, while on tour, they released a new DVD with one of their performances in January at Shibuya O-West. By that time Takumi was announced as the new support drummer. In August, they released the single "Rorschach inkblot".

9Goats Black Out covered Buck-Tick's song "Speed" for the compilation Crush! 2 -90's V-Rock Best Hit Cover Songs-, which was released on November 23, 2011, and features current visual kei bands covering songs from bands that were important to the '90s visual kei movement. In late October and early November, they played at three-lives campaign Travel Monster with other bands, including Dolly and Mix Speaker’s,Inc.

The band continued playing lives through 2012 with other musicians. In early 2012, they played three shows with Moran, D and cocklobin. From February through March, they went on a trio tour with Moran and Dolly. On December, they performed with Moran and Plasticzooms.

9Goats Black Out disbanded with a final concert on February 9, 2013, followed by the release of a last album. In the same year, Uta and other notable Japanese musicians formed the band Sukekiyo, headed by vocalist Kyo of Dir En Grey.

=== Revival (2027) ===
In September 2026 9GOATS BLACK OUT announced that they will hold one day revival on May 30th, 2027, at Shinjuku ZEPP, that would mark 19 full years since band formed, as well as band's new official fan club LULL and vocalist ryo's personal fan club, YOUR.

== Musical style and themes ==
When the singer of the band, Ryo, was asked about the meaning of his band's name, he explained that the name was formed first with the number "9", from his birth date (January 19), and the word "Goats", based on his zodiac sign (Capricorn). Ryo then completed the band name with the words "Black" and "Out".

== Members ==
- Ryo – vocals (ex-D'elsquel, ex-Galruda, ex-Gullet)
- Uta – guitar (ex-Laypua, ex-Layarch, ex-Rayarch)
- Hati – bass (ex-Laypua, ex-Luberie, ex-Rayarch)

=== Support members ===
- Takumi – drums (2011–2013, ex-Virgil)

=== Former support members ===
- Aki – drums (2007–2010, ex-Sin, ex-Gullet, ex-Clozet)
- Akaya – keyboard and manipulation (2007–2012)

== Discography ==
=== Albums ===
- Devils in Bedside (30 April 2008)
- Black rain (14 February 2009)
- Tanatos (24 March 2010)
- Calling (11 December 2012)
- Archives (29 May 2013)

=== Singles ===
- "Sleeping Beauty" (9 September 2008)
- "Rorschach Inkblot" (10 August 2011)
- "Draw" (9 November 2011)
- "Karte" (14 February 2012)

=== DVDs ===
- Bright Garden (25 July 2009)
- Melancholy Pool (23 April 2011)
