= Eyes Love You =

Single by hide

from the album Hide Your Face
- Released: August 5, 1993
- Genre: Alternative rock
- Label: MCA Victor
- Songwriters: Yukinojo Mori, hide
- Producer: hide

Hide singles chronology
"Eyes Love You" (1993)	"50% & 50%" (1993)

Audio sample
- "Eyes Love You (T.T. Version)" from Hide Your Face: file; help

"Eyes Love You" is the debut single by Japanese musician hide, released on August 5, 1993. It reached number 3 on the Oricon chart. His second single "50% & 50%" was released on the same day. Both singles' covers are identical except; "Eyes Love You" is green, whereas "50% & 50%" is red. They form a 3D picture when they are placed side by side. It was certified gold upon release by RIAJ.

== Background ==
hide embarked on a solo career in 1993 due to the downtime in X Japan. Initially wanting to hire several different vocalists because he was unsure of his own voice, he eventually began taking vocal lessons from Toshi's coach and sang the material himself.

Wanting to contrast something unusual with a pop background, hide hired Yukinojo Mori to pen the lyrics to his first two A-sides. As a kid, hide was fond of Bow Wow's 1982 album Warning from Stardust, where the A-side songs had lyrics in English and the B-side in Japanese. Liking the Japanese lyrics better, hide only realized Mori was their author afterwards.

In an August 11, 1993 performance of the song on the NHK television show Pop Jam, hide was backed by his future Spread Beaver bandmate I.N.A. and Jennifer Finch and Demetra "Dee" Plakas of American all-girl grunge band L7.

The music video for "Eyes Love You" won the 1994 MTV Video Music Awards' Japan Prize.

== Releases ==
"Eyes Love You" and "50% & 50%" were both released on August 5, 1993 by MCA Victor, as hide's first solo works. Although he previously collaborated with J and Inoran to contribute the song "Frozen Bug" to the Dance 2 Noise 004 compilation under the group name "M*A*S*S".

A slightly different version of "Eyes Love You" subtitled "T.T. Version" appears on his first studio album, Hide Your Face. A remix appears as the B-side to his third single "Dice".

On December 12, 2007, the single was re-released with a new cover. On April 28, 2010, it was re-released again as part of the first releases in "The Devolution Project", which was a release of hide's original eleven singles on picture disc vinyl.

== Track listing ==
No.	Title	Lyrics	Music	Length
1.	"Eyes Love You"	Yukinojo Mori	hide	5:58
2.	"Oblaat"	hide	hide	4:49
92.	"Eyes Love You (Junk Version)" (hidden track)			1:26

== Cover versions ==
The song was covered by, K.A.Z and I.N.A.'s band, Sonic Storage feat. Kohshi from Flow, on the 2006 Yukinojo Mori tribute album Words of Yukinojo. The title track was covered by A on the Tribute III -Visual Spirits- tribute album, while "Oblaat" was covered by Gotcharocka on Tribute II -Visual Spirits-, both released on July 3, 2013. For Tribute VII -Rock Spirits-, released on December 18, 2013, it was covered by Yukinojo Mori, who wrote the lyrics to the song back in 1993, with Buck-Tick guitarist Imai Hisashi and titled "Eyes Love You~Ver.2013". "Eyes Love You" was covered by Breakerz for the June 6, 2018 Tribute Impulse album.
