= 50% & 50% =

Single by hide

from the album Hide Your Face
- Released: August 5, 1993
- Genre: Alternative rock, hard rock
- Label: MCA Victor
- Songwriters: Yukinojo Mori, hide

Hide singles chronology
"Eyes Love You" (1993)	"50% & 50%" (1993)	"Dice" (1994)

"50% & 50%" is the second single by Japanese musician hide, released on August 5, 1993. It reached number 6 on the Oricon chart. His first single "Eyes Love You" was released on the same day. Both singles' covers are identical except; "50% & 50%" is red, whereas "Eyes Love You" is green. They form a 3D picture when they are placed side by side. It was certified gold upon release by RIAJ.

The single was re-released on December 12, 2007, with a new cover. On April 28, 2010, it was re-released again as part of the first releases in "The Devolution Project", which was a release of hide's original eleven singles on picture disc vinyl.

== Background ==
hide embarked on a solo career in 1993 due to the downtime in X Japan. Initially wanting to hire several different vocalists because he was unsure of his own voice, he eventually began taking vocal lessons from Toshi's coach and sang the material himself.

Wanting to contrast something unusual with a pop background, hide hired Yukinojo Mori to pen the lyrics to his first two A-sides. As a kid, hide was fond of Bow Wow's 1982 album Warning from Stardust, where the A-side songs had lyrics in English and the B-side in Japanese. Liking the Japanese lyrics better, hide only realized Mori was their author afterwards. "50% & 50%" was written after the A-side and B-side on "Eyes Love You"

An acoustic rendition of the song, referred to as "50% & 50% (Crystal Lake Version)", appears on hide's first studio album Hide Your Face.

In a promotional video for "Doubt", hide is backed by his future Spread Beaver bandmate I.N.A. and Jennifer Finch and Demetra "Dee" Plakas of American all-girl grunge band L7.

== Track listing ==
No.	Title	Lyrics	Music	Length
1.	"50% & 50%"	Yukinojo Mori	hide	4:41
2.	"Doubt"	hide	hide	4:46

== Cover versions ==
hide's latter band Zilch recorded an English version of "Doubt" for their 1998 album 3.2.1.. The song was then covered by Buck-Tick on the 1999 hide tribute album Tribute Spirits, they have performed the cover live at their concerts. It was also covered live by the Underneath at the hide memorial summit on May 4, 2008. defspiral, which is composed of four of the five former members of the Underneath, covered it for their hide tribute maxi single "Reply -Tribute to hide-" in 2011. The title track was covered by Mix Speaker's,Inc. on the Tribute II -Visual Spirits- tribute album, while "Doubt" was covered by Machine (duo of Spread Beaver's Kiyoshi and Penicillin's Hakuei) on it and by D=Out on Tribute III -Visual Spirits-, both albums were released on July 3, 2013. For Tribute VII -Rock Spirits-, released on December 18, 2013, "Doubt" was covered by The Novembers. "Doubt" was covered by Hisashi and Yow-Row (Gari) for the June 6, 2018 Tribute Impulse album.
