= D=Out =

Japanese visual kei rock band

- Origin: Japan
- Genres: Alternative rock; pop rock; industrial rock
- Years active: 2006-
- Labels: Geneon Entertainment; Speed Disk; PS Company
- Members: Kouki; Ibuki; Hikaru; Reika; Naoto
- Past members: Minase
- Website: www.pscompany.co.jp/d-out

D=Out (ダウト, Dauto) is a Japanese visual kei rock band formed in 2006, previously signed to Speed Disk and Geneon Entertainment. Since 2011, they have been signed to PS Company and Tokuma Japan.

== Biography ==
D=Out began activities in December 2006. Following Kouki's former band, Mist of Rouge's, disbandment in 2003, he teamed up with Ibuki (guitar), Hikaru (guitar), Reika (bass) and Minase (drums) to start a new band. Only five days after the announcement of D=Out's formation, the five members played their first concert on December 29 at Holiday Shinjuku with a number of concerts at Ikebukuro Cyber and Holiday Shinjuku after that. They signed to Speed Disk in 2007, moved to Geneon Entertainment next year, then moved first to Indie PSC in 2010, then to PS Company, when they signed with Tokuma Japan in 2011. They also released their first two albums in Europe through CLJ Records and had two tours in Europe, first in 2009, then in 2010.

They covered Hide's song "Doubt" for Tribute II -Visual Spirits-, released on July 3, 2013.

== Members ==
- Kouki (幸樹) - Vocal
- Ibuki (威吹) - Guitar
- Hikaru (ひヵる) - Guitar
- Reika (玲夏) - Bass
- Naoto (直人) - Drums

Former members

- Minase (ミナセ) - Drums (December 2006 - September 2014)

== Discography ==
=== Albums and EPs ===
- Rōman Jōmyakuteki Chabangeki (浪漫静脈的茶番劇, April 30, 2008)
- Cannonball Vol. 4 (June 11, 2008)
- Zipang (August 8, 2008)
- Tōryūmon (登竜門, July 22, 2009)
- Carnival (浮世[初回盤-大, March 10, 2010) Oricon Weekly Album Chart Top Position: 41
- Music Nippon (February 8, 2012)
- high collar (October 15, 2012)
- Kabuki Disco (歌舞伎デスコ, February 20, 2013)
- Zenshin Zenrei Ouka Shuu (全身全霊謳歌集, July 23, 2014)
- Shin Gi Tai (January 6, 2016)

=== Singles ===
- "Flashback" (フラッシュバック, March 4, 2007)
- "Heisei Bubble" (平成バヴル, June 22, 2007)
- "Shirohata Sengen" (白旗宣言, October 24, 2007)
- "Bara Iro no Jinsei" (ばら色ノ人生, December 19, 2007)
- "Bankoku, Dai Tōkyō / Akai Kasa to Anata" (万國、大東京/赤い傘と貴女, February 27, 2008)
- "Myōjō Orion" (明星オリオン, December 17, 2008) Oricon Weekly Single Chart Top Position: 44
- "Hanasaki Beauty" (花咲ビューティ, April 22, 2009) Oricon Weekly Single Chart Top Position: 38
- "Aoi Tori" (青い鳥, August 26, 2009) Oricon Weekly Single Chart Top Position: 33
- "Psychedelico-Psychedelico"(サイケデリコ∞サイケデリコ, September 8, 2010) Oricon Weekly Single Chart Top Position: 26
- "Sunrise"(March 30, 2010)
- "One" (March 16, 2011)
- "Roman Revolution" (July 27, 2011)
- "Zenshin Zenrei Lives" (November 2, 2011)
- "Aisuru Hito" (あいするひと, (May 2, 2012)
- "Chukyori Renai" (中距離恋愛, (November 14, 2012)
- "Koiabaki, Amezarashi" (恋アバき、雨ザラし, (June 26, 2013)
- "Kanden 18gou" (October 30, 2013)
- "Zange no Hanamichi" (May 21, 2014)
- "Koi ga Dekinai" (恋ができない, (October 28, 2015)
