= Mix Speaker's,Inc. =

Japanese visual kei rock band

Background information
- Origin: Japan
- Genres: Electronic rock, industrial rock, experimental rock, pop rock, synthpop
- Years active: 2006–2018
- Labels: Mix Speaker's, Inc.
- Past members: Miki; Nika; Aya; Keiji; Seek; S Yuki
- Website: www.mixspeakersinc.com

Mix Speaker's, Inc. were a Japanese visual kei rock band formed in early 2006. Their members were Aya (Psycho le Cému, Isabelle), Seek (Psycho le Cému, Isabelle), Keiji (Kamikaze Boys, Isabelle), S (Kamikaze Boys, Isabelle), Miki (Pink Film, Scissor, Isabelle), and Yuki (Egurigori). Mix Speaker's, Inc. rapidly gained popularity throughout the winter and spring, appearing on the front cover of the visual magazine, Cure Magazine in May. Among their distinguishing marks were the two lead singers, Miki and Yuki, and elaborate monster and fantasy themed costumes.

== History ==
Mix Speaker's, Inc. began preparing to debut on December 1, 2006, from the members of Isabelle and Egurigori (エグリゴリ). They officially started February 19, 2007 and played their first live show at Niigata Club Junk Box on February 23. They played their first one-man, solo show on April 13, 2007, at Shibuya Boxx. Their next set of one-man performances in November 2007 covering three cities were sold out. Their first single, "Mix Speaker's, Box", was released prior to the band's official start, in December 2006.

During July and August 2009, they held a seven-day concert series, each day with one concept conceived by a band member, with the last day dedicated to the fans. The finale, the 8th day, is to be held at Club Citta in Kanagawa, whereas the other performances were in Tokyo proper. All seven shows were sold out, with tickets being sold for the finale after each.

The Final was held at C.C. Lemon Hall on Shibuya, Tokyo, on December 22. in 2009 and was titled "2nd Story Grand Finale [Big Bang Music!]～線路は続くよどこまでも / Senro wa Tsuzukuyo Dokomademo～".

Mix Speakers, Inc. covered Cascade's song "S.O.S. Romantic" for the compilation Crush! -90's V-Rock Best Hit Cover Songs-. The album was released on January 26, 2011 and features current visual kei bands covering songs from bands that were important to the '90s visual kei movement. They covered hide's "50% & 50%" for Tribute II -Visual Spirits-, released on July 3, 2013.

Mix Speakers, Inc. disbanded in February 2018.

== Members ==
Yuki - Vocals, synthesizers, keyboards

- Little Angel
- White Warlock
- Abel Monster
- Wonder Researcher
- Soprano Star
- Prayer Cantor
- Dog Zombie
- Dog Pierrot
- Captain Dolphin
- Zeus Angel

Miki - Vocals, synthesizers, keyboards

- Little Devil
- Black Warlock
- Cain Monster
- Fickle Cat
- Tenor Star
- Weather Forecaster
- Cat Zombie
- Cat Pierrot
- Ghost Pirate
- Hades Lucifer

Aya - Guitars

- Skeleton Witch
- Fire Kyoncie
- Eve Phoenix
- SF Purser
- FF V
- Dry Bandeira
- Rabbit Zombie
- Rabbit Pierrot
- Navigator Clione
- Gabriel Venus

Keiji - Guitars

- Digi Vampire
- Water Ogre
- Adam Dragon
- Mecha Police
- Crescendo Parker
- Hurricane Sala
- Lion Zombie
- Lion Pierrot
- Sniper Seahorse
- Michael Cupid

Seek - Bass

- Big Franken
- Wood Zombie
- God Turtle
- ET Bomb
- Drill Bass
- Thunder Mucho
- Condor Zombie
- Condor Pierrot
- Carpenter Octopus
- Uriel Castle

S - Drums, percussion, drum machine

- Moon Wolf
- Wind Mummy
- Pet Tiger
- Robo Cook
- Funny Snare
- Quake Bateria
- Sheep Zombie
- Sheep Pierrot
- Doctor Balloonfish
- Raphael Pegasus

== Discography ==
=== Albums ===
- Friday Night "Monstime" (13 June 2007)
- Monsters ~Pocketto no Naka ni ha~ Junk Story (MONSTERS〜ポケットの中にはJUNK STORY〜, 13 February 2008)
- Wonder Traveling (22 October 2008)
- Big Bang Music! (23 September 2009)
- Animal Zombies (7 April 2010)
- Never Ending Story (16 June 2010)
- It's a Dream World (13 July 2011)
- Sea Paradise no Hihou (23 May 2012)
- Hoshifuru Yuenchi regular (6 November 2012)
- Hoshifuru Yuenchi limited (18 December 2012)

=== Singles ===
- Mix Speaker's, Box (20 December 2006)
- "Monstart" Family (31 October 2007)
- My Wish [Horror] X'mas (19 December 2007)
- Identification Card (13 August 2008)
- Romeo no Melody (ロメオのメロディ, 1 April 2009)
- Yuuwakusei Rhythm (誘ワク星リズム, 1 July 2009)
- Never Ending Story (16 June 2010)
- Cinderella (シンデレラ, 3 July 2010)
- Midnight Queen (29 September 2010)
- Circus (9 March 2011)
- Shiny Tale (22 February 2012)
- Sky Heaven (4 September 2012)

=== Omnibus ===
- Cannon Ball Vol.3 (21 February 2007)
- Crush! -90's V-Rock Best Hit Cover Songs (26 January 2011)
- V-Anime Rocks! (1 August 2012)
- Tribute II -Visual Spirits- (3 July 2013)

=== DVD ===
- 13's Club (7 December 2007)
- Monster Wars ~Grand Finale~ - (22 July 2008)
- [Departure] ~Space Musical Parade~ - (31 January 2009)
- [Big Bang Music!] ~線路は続くよどこまでも~ - (7 January 2010)
- Rainbow Circus ~6匹のピエロとモノクロサーカス団~ - (22 April 2011)
