= The Continuation =

Studio album by Deathgaze
- Released: September 9, 2009
- Genre: Metalcore, alternative metal
- Label: Enter Brain

Deathgaze chronology
Awake -Evoke the Urge- (2008)	The Continuation (2009)	Bliss Out (2010)

The Continuation is the third full-length album by the Japanese band Deathgaze. It was released on September 9, 2009.

== Track listing ==
No.	Title	Length
1.	"Yami ni Ame Fuhai Shita Sekai (闇に雨 腐敗した世界)"	04:35
2.	"GENOCIDE AND MASS MURDER"	04:30
3.	"Abyss"	04:28
4.	"Shizakura (死桜)"	04:09
5.	"Memento Mori (メメント モリ)"	04:30
6.	"Dies Irae (ディエス イレ)"	04:34
7.	"Shishuu (死臭)"	05:11
8.	"Love Song (ラブソング)"	06:11
9.	"「294036224052」"	01:55
10.	"Lichtsäule (Rihitozoire; リヒトゾイレ)"	02:54
11.	"Insult Kiss Me"	05:40
12.	"Dearest"	04:52
13.	"Amends (Piano Version)"	07:01
