= Awake -Evoke the Urge- =

Studio album by Deathgaze
- Released: December 10, 2008
- Genres: Metalcore, alternative metal
- Label: Enter Brain

Deathgaze chronology
| Genocide and Mass Murder (2006) | Awake -Evoke the Urge- (2008) | The Continuation (2009) |

Awake -Evoke the Urge- is the second studio album by metal band Deathgaze. It is the first full-length album featuring Ai as their vocalist and Kosuke as their new bassist.

In support of the new album, the band toured nationwide in Japan from November 2008 to March 2009. It was their second major tour.

== Track listing ==
| No. | Title | Length |
|---|---|---|
| 1. | "Japanese Meliorism" | 2:27 |
| 2. | "-1" | 2:41 |
| 3. | "Evoke the world" | 4:31 |
| 4. | "unchain wing" | 4:35 |
| 5. | "goodbye my earth" | 4:07 |
| 6. | "quench" | 3:50 |
| 7. | "forsaken" | 4:59 |
| 8. | "paranoid parade" | 3:45 |
| 9. | "domestic pig #1013" | 3:24 |
| 10. | "fuck me" | 3:47 |
| 11. | "amends" | 4:31 |

Disc two (DVD)
| No. | Title | Length |
|---|---|---|
| 1. | "abyss" | 4:48 |
| 2. | "2008 tour vol.1 offshot/abyss making" | 44:09 |
