= Deluhi =

Japanese visual kei metal band

- Also known as: Grave Seed (2006–2008)
- Origin: Japan
- Genres: Alternative metal; metalcore
- Years active: 2006–2011
- Labels: Braveman Records; CLJ Records
- Past members: Juri; Leda; Aggy; Sujk
- Website: www.deluhi.com

Deluhi (stylized as DELUHI) was a Japanese visual kei metal band, formed in 2008, by guitarist Leda who recruited Juri as vocalist when the band Grave Seed they made was renamed. Leda was previously bassist for the power metal band Galneryus, going by the name Yu-To.

== History ==
Deluhi was featured on the American TV show Bento Beatbox on the Anime Network on 15 April 2009. In May 2009, they were included on the compilation album J-Visual[ism] 2, released by the European label CLJ Records. In late 2009, Deluhi shared a national tour of Japan with Matenrou Opera.

The band announced that they would take a hiatus starting on 1 December 2010, following the completion of their concert at Shibuya O-East. However, on 1 April 2011 Deluhi announced that they would disband after their final tour in July 2011.

After disbandment, guitarist Leda founded Undivide as his solo project, with drummer Sujk join in and vocalist Kihiro (LOKA/ ex-Supe), also Sujk started out his solo project in 2012. Undivide disbanded in March 2013.

Aggy formed a new band called Garson as vocalist with GYZE's members in April 2012. The band broke up in October of the same year, without making any releases.

Since 2013, Leda has been in Babymetal, being one of several rotating studio musicians that comprise the backing Kami Band.

In January 2015 Leda started his new band Far East Dizain whose members include: Vocal: Keita, Guitar: Leda, Bass: Ryu, Drums: Sujk.

== Discography ==
=== Singles ===
- "Orion Once Again" (23 July 2008, 2nd press 20 May 2009)
- "Visvasrit" (29 October 2008)
- "Mahadeva" (26 November 2008)
- "Jagannath" (31 December 2008)
- "No Salvation" (8 January 2009)
- "Flash:B[l]ack" (20 May 2009)
- "Two Hurt" (8 May 2009, Fool's Mate edition 30 October 2009) Oricon Weekly Chart Position: 114
- "Recall" (4 November 2009)
- "Revolver Blast" (24 March 2010) Oricon Weekly Chart Position: 51, Oricon Indies Weekly Chart Position: 1
- "Frontier" (16 June 2010) Oricon Weekly Chart Position: 64
- "The Farthest" (14 July 2010) Oricon Weekly Chart Position: 47
- "Departure" (4 August 2010) Oricon Weekly Chart Position: 70

=== Albums and mini-albums ===
- Surveillance (26 March 2008)
- Yggdalive (4 November 2009) Oricon Weekly Chart Position: 91
- Vandalism (27 July 2011)
- Vandalism Σ (25 March 2015)
- Deluhism X (19 December 2018)
