= Screw (band) =

Japanese visual kei rock band

- Origin: Japan
- Genres: Hard rock; alternative metal; metalcore
- Years active: 2006–2016
- Labels: PS Company; Indie PSC; CLJ Records; Tokuma Japan Communications
- Past members: Byou; Kazuki; Manabu; Jin; Rui; Yuuto
- Website: pscompany.co.jp/screw/

Screw (typeset as SCREW) was a Japanese visual kei rock band formed in March 2006 by vocalist Byou and Yuuto, who were previously in the band Joker before its disbandment.

== Biography ==
=== 2011-present: Biran, Going Major and Xanadu Seventh Heaven Tour ===
In 2011, Screw released two new singles, which were later included on their fifth studio album, Biran, released on February 15, 2012.

The single "Deep Six" reached number 23 on the Oricon charts and number 1 on the Indies chart. The single "Brainstorm" reached number 30 on Oricon charts and number 1 on the Indies chart.

Their fifth studio album was released on February 15, 2012. It immediately reached number 3 on the Indies chart. Within its first week, the album reached number 42 on the Oricon chart.

Screw announced that they are to go major with the release of their new single "Xanadu", set to come out on October 17. The group will start a one-man tour, Xanadu -Seventh Heaven...- on the same day at Shibuya O-West with a tour final date at Osaka Muse on December 9.

Titled Teardrop, the single will be released on February 6. There are currently no more details available, but more information is expected to be revealed closer to the single's release. Screw have also announced a short one-man tour for 2013, titled Screw 7th Anniversary Live Neverending Breath. The tour will start on April 13 at Osaka Muse and end on April 20 at Shibuya-AX, for a total of three dates.

They covered hide's song "Dice" for Tribute III -Visual Spirits-, released on July 3, 2013.

== Former members ==
- Byo (鋲) – lead vocals (2006–2016)
- Kazuki (和己) – leader, lead guitar, backing vocals (2006–2016)
- Manabu (マナブ) – rhythm guitar, backing vocals (2007–2016)
- Jin (ジン) – drums, percussion, (2006–2016)
- Rui (ルイ) – bass, backing vocals (2009–2014)
- Yuuto (ゆうと) – bass, backing vocals (2006–2009)

== Discography ==
=== Albums ===
| Title | Release date | Label | Type | Oricon major | Oricon indies |
|---|---|---|---|---|---|
| Nanairo no Reienka | July 12, 2006 | Speed Disk | Mini-album | | |
| Fusion of the Core | March 14, 2007 | Speed Disk | Album | | |
| Racial Mixture | April 8, 2009 | Indie PSC | Mini-album | | |
| X-Rays | September 16, 2009 | Indie PSC | Album | 72 | |
| Anaphyaxis | January 9, 2010 | Indie PSC | Album | 63 | 5 |
| Duality | November 17, 2010 | Indie PSC | Album | 57 | 5 |
| Biran | February 15, 2012 | Indie PSC | Album | 42 | 3 |
| SCREW | July 10, 2013 | Tokuma Shota | Album | | |
| Psycho Monsters | August 20, 2014 | Tokuma Shota | Album | | |
| Konsui | April 22, 2015 | Tokuma Shota | Mini-album | | |
| Kakusei | August 19, 2015 | Tokuma Shota | Mini-album | | |
| BRILLIANT | March 30, 2016 | PS Music | Best Album | | |

=== Singles ===
| Title | Release date | Label | Chart Positions |
|---|---|---|---|
| Nejireta Shiso | June 21, 2006 | Speed Disk | 192 |
| Sakuran Scream | October 25, 2006 | Speed Disk | 140 |
| Heartless Screen | November 22, 2006 | Speed Disk | 169 |
| Finale of Screw | December 20, 2006 | Speed Disk | 149 |
| Venom | September 12, 2007 | Indie PSC | 113 |
| Virus | October 3, 2007 | Indie PSC | 139 |
| Raging Blood | February 27, 2008 | Indie PSC | 37 |
| Wailing Wall | August 13, 2008 | Indie PSC | 40 |
| Gather Roses | November 19, 2008 | Indie PSC | 39 |
| Cursed Hurricane | May 12, 2010 | Indie PSC | 36 |
| Ancient Rain | June 9, 2010 | Indie PSC | 39 |
| Deep Six | March 23, 2011 | Indie PSC | 23 |
| Brainstorm | September 21, 2011 | Indie PSC | 34 |
| Xanadu | October 17, 2012 | Tokuma Japan Communications | 19 |
| Teardrop | February 6, 2013 | Tokuma Japan Communications | 20 |
| Cavalcade | November 6, 2013 | Tokuma Japan Communications | |
| Fugly | April 23, 2014 | Tokuma Japan Communications | |
