= Kinniku Shōjo Tai =

Japanese rock band

Kinniku Shōjo Tai 筋肉少女帯
- Also known as: King-Show
- Origin: Tokyo, Japan
- Genres: Alternative metal, experimental metal, progressive metal, hard rock, heavy metal
- Years active: 1982–1999, 2006–present
- Labels: Nagomu; Toy's Factory; MCA Victor; Mercury; Tokuma Japan
- Members: Kenji Ōtsuki; Yūichirō Uchida; Toshiaki Honjō; Fumihiko Kitsutaka
- Past members: Akira Ōta; Edozō Mishiba; Minosuke; Norihiro Ishizuka; Hiroshi Sekiguchi; Shōichi Tomomori
- Website: http://king-show.net/

Kinniku Shōjo Tai (Japanese: 筋肉少女帯; lit. "Muscle Girl Band"), also known as King-Show (筋少, Kin Sho), is a Japanese rock band. They were very popular from the late 1980s through the early 1990s. In 1999 they disbanded, but then in 2006 they regrouped.

== History ==
=== Independent years ===
In 1979 when Vocalist Kenji Ōtsuki and Bassist Yūichirō Uchida were Junior High School students, they started the band called "Dotechins" (This name was from Kenji Ōtsuki's Junior High School nickname) and this band was a precursor of Kinniku Shōjo Tai.

In February 1982 after they disbanded Dotechins and became high school students, they started a new band, "Kinniku Shōnen Shōjo Tai". On April 6 the same year, they debuted in the independent music scene, and changed the band name to "Kinniku Shōjo Tai".

In March 1986, the original keyboardist Edozō Mishiba joined the band, and this year the band has gotten a high ability and evaluation.

In 1987 they released the EP called, "Takagi Boo Densetsu" (Legend of Boo Takagi) from Nagomu Record (this independent record label is owned by Uchōten vocalist Keralino Sandorovich). This EP caused some trouble with Takagi's office and the EP was then recalled.

=== Major debut ===
In 1988, they successfully made a deal with TOY'S FACTORY and later that year in June they released their 1st album, "Buddha L" and their 1st single, "Shaka". But the band lineup was still not established. In 1989, Edozō Mishiba left the band and current guitarist Toshiaki Honjō and Fumihiko Kitsutaka joined the band. Then they released their 3rd Album called "Neko no Tebukuro (Cat's Glove) ". After this, the band lineup became established and has not changed until they disbanded in 1999. This year the band became very popular in Japan.

=== Disband ===
The band was going smoothly, but in July 1998 drummer Akira Ōta left the band. After a concert in 1999, guitarist Fumihiko Kitsutaka left the band for an administrative reason. Also leader and vocalist Kenji Ōtsuki left the band taking full responsibility for Fumihiko Kitsutaka leaving the band. And finally the band was completely finished. After disbanding, Kenji Ōtsuki formed a new band called "Tokusatsu" and Fumihiko Kitsutaka joined a band called "X.Y.Z.→A".

=== Regroup ===
After disbanding the former band members had a few misunderstandings but finally most members became reconciled. And on December 28, 2006, Kenji Ōtsuki, Yūichirō Uchida, Toshiaki Honjō, and Fumihiko Kitsutaka announced that "Kinniku Shōjo Tai will regroup". Right now they are doing many concerts in Japan.

They covered hide's song "Dice" for Tribute VII -Rock Spirits-, released on December 18, 2013.

== Members ==
- Vocal: Kenji Ōtsuki
- Bass: Yūichirō Uchida
- Guitar: Toshiaki Honjō
- Guitar: Fumihiko Kitsutaka

Past Members

- Drum: Akira Ōta (1988–1998)
- Keyboard: Edozō Mishiba (Satoshi Mishiba) (1986–1989) (he has participated as support since 2006)
- Drum: Minosuke (1983–1988)
- Guitar: Norihiro Bera Ishizuka (1985–1986, died 2019)
- Guitar: Hiroshi Sekiguchi (1987–1988) ex Bachikaburi
- Guitar: Shōichi Tomomori (1987) ex Rebecca

Support Members

- Keyboard: Takayuki Hatano (1989–1998)
- Guitar: Atsushi Yokozeki (1988–1989)
- Drum: Tora (2006-) Also he is Onmyō-Za's drummer.
- Drum: Kōji Hasegawa (2007-)

== Discography ==
=== Single ===
- Takagi Boo Densetsu (Legend of Takagi Boo) (July 1987) Nagomu Record
- Shaka (Buddha) (21 June 1988) TOY'S FACTORY
- Ganso Takagi Boo Densetsu (Legend of Boo Takagi Original) (5 December 1989) TOY'S FACTORY
- Saboten to Buntline (Cactus and Buntline) (5 September 1990) TOY'S FACTORY
- Odoru Dame Ningen (Dancing Feckless Man) (5 July 1991) TOY'S FACTORY
- Koori no Sekai (The World of Ice) (21 February 1992) / Yōsui Inoue Cover. TOY'S FACTORY
- Battle Yarō ~Hyaku-mannin no Aniki~ (Battle Guys ~A Million Bros.~) (21 June 1992) Street Fighter 2 Japanese Commercial Song. TOY'S FACTORY
- Abaite Oyariyo Dolbacky (Please Unmask It, Dolbacky) (21 March 1993) TOY'S FACTORY
- Kimi yo Ore de Kaware (You! Change with Me!) (21 May 1993) TOY'S FACTORY
- Kumo no Ito (Spiderweb) (25 January 1994) MCA Victor
- Kana, Atama wo Yokushite Ageyō (Kana, I'll Make You Smart) (21 May 1994) MCA Victor
- Riruka no Sōretsu (Riruka's Funeral Procession) (23 November 1994) MCA Victor
- True Romance (6 March 1996) MCA Victor
- Boku no Uta wo Subete Kimi ni Yaru (I Give All My Songs to You) (25 November 1996) Mercury Music
- Chiisana Koi no Melody (The Small Melody of Love) (29 January 1997) Mercury Music
- Tachimukau ~Kuruisaku Ningen no Shōmei~ (Confront ~Human Proof Blooms Madly~) (30 April 1997) Mercury Music
- 221B Senki (221B Record of War) (3 September 1997) Kinniku Shōjo Tai feat. Ichirou Mizuki. Mercury Music
- Nakanaori no Tema (Theme of Reconciliation) (5 September 2007) TOY'S FACTORY
- Tour Final (27 August 2008) TOY'S FACTORY
- Mazeru na Kiken (Don't get Mixed Up In This, It's Dangerous) (5 August 2015) Tokuma Japan Communications

=== Album ===
- Tororo no Nōzui Densetsu (Legend of Melted Encephalon) (August 1985) Nagomu Record
- Nozomi Kanae Tamae (Please Realize My Wish) (May 1987) Nagomu Record
- Buddha L (21 June 1988) TOY'S FACTORY
- SISTER STRAWBERRY (21 December 1988) TOY'S FACTORY
- Neko no Tebukuro (Cat Named "Tebukuro (Gloves)") (5 July 1989) TOY'S FACTORY
- Cicus Dan Panorama-tō e Kaeru (Circus Troupe Returns to Panorama Island) (5 February 1990) TOY'S FACTORY
- Gekkō-chū (Moonlight Worm) (21 November 1990) TOY'S FACTORY
- Danzai! Danzai! Mata Danzai!! (Condemnation! Condemnation! Condemnation Again!!) (21 July 1991) TOY'S FACTORY
- Elise no Tameni (For Elise) (21 May 1992) TOY'S FACTORY
- UFO to Koibito (UFO and Lover) (25 April 1993) TOY'S FACTORY
- Leticle-za Mōsō (Delusion of Leticle) (21 April 1994) MCA Victor
- Stacy no Bijutu (The Art of Stacy) (23 March 1996) MCA Victor
- Kira Kira to Kagayaku Mono (Glitteringly Shining One) (9 December 1996) Mercury Music
- Saigo no Seisen (The Last Saint War) (15 October 1997) Mercury Music
- Shinjin (New Figure) (5 September 2007) TOY'S FACTORY
- Season 2 (20 May 2009) TOY'S FACTORY
- Tuta Karamaru Q no Wakusei (The Planet of Q which the Ivy Twines Around) (2 June 2010) TOY'S FACTORY
- THE SHOW MUST GO ON (8 October 2014) Tokuma Japan Communications
- Omake no Ichinichi (Tatakai no Hibi) (A Day of Appendix (Every Day of Battle)) (7 October 2015) Tokuma Japan Communications

Compilation Album

- Nagomu Zenkyoku Shū (Nagomu All Songs Collection) (25 January 1990) Nagomu Record
- Kinshō no Daisharin (Giant Swing of King-Show) (21 March 1992) TOY'S FACTORY
- Kinshō no Daisuigin (Great Mercury of King-Show) (1 November 1993) TOY'S FACTORY
- Kinshō MCA Victor Best "BEST & CULT" (18 December 1996) MCA Victor
- SAN FRANCISCO (29 June 1998) Mercury Music
- Hachijū-nendai no Kinniku Shōjo Tai (King-Show the '80s) (80 Years Live Best) (29 September 1998) UGS Record
- Super Value (19 December 2001) Universal Music
- Kinshō no Daikaizoku vol.1 (Great Bootleg of King-Show vol.1 (Live)) (26 December 2002) Kinniku Record
- Kinshō no Daikaizoku vol.2 (Great Bootleg of King-Show vol.2) (Live) (20 February 2003) Kinniku Record
- GOLDEN☆BEST (1 March 2006) Universal Music
- Kinniku Shōjo Tai Nagomu Collection (Independent Best) (21 June 2006) Nagomu Record
- Kinniku Shōjo Tai Fukkatsu Kyūkyoku Best Daikōshiki (King-Show Returns Ultimate Best "Great Official") (14 March 2007) TOY'S FACTORY
- Daikōshiki 2 (Great Official 2) (19 March 2008) TOY'S FACTORY
- Kōshiki Self Cover Best "Shihanseiki" (Official Self Cover Best "A Quarter of a Century") (29 May 2013) Tokuma Japan Communications

=== Video DVD ===
- KIN-SHOW no Daizankoku (Greate Cruel of Kin-Show) (21 July 1988) TOY'S FACTORY
- Kinniku Shōjo Tai at Budōkan (25 April 1990) TOY'S FACTORY
- Sannen Gorosi (The Ultimate Mortal Attack of Sambo) (5 August 1991) TOY'S FACTORY
- Kinshō Matsuri da! 90pun (That's King-Show Festival! 90min.) (5 July 1992) TOY'S FACTORY
- science fiction double feature ~Kinniku Shōjo Tai Live & PV-clips~ (18 March 1998) Mercury Music
- '80s KING-SHOW Live & Clip (10 December 1998) UGS Record
- THE Nakanaori! Fukkatsu! Kinniku Shōjo Tai ~Cicus Dan Panorama-tō e Kaeru '06~ (Reconciliation! Reunion! King-Show ~Circus Troupe Returns to Panorama Island '06~) (14 March 2007) TOY'S FACTORY
- SPACE SHOWER ARCHIVE Kinniku Shōjo Tai LIVE 9103 (22 June 2007) Digital Site, Inc.
- Cicus Dan Budōkan e Kaeru (Circus Troupe Returns to Budōkan) (17 December 2008) TOY'S FACTORY
