= Kenji Ohtsuki =

Japanese musician (born 1966)

Kenji Ohtsuki (大槻 ケンヂ, 大槻 賢二, Ōtsuki Kenji; born February 6, 1966 in Nakano, Tokyo) is a Japanese rock musician and Seiun Award-winning writer. His musical career began in the late 1970s. He is the vocalist of Kinniku Shōjo Tai, Tokusatsu, Underground Searchlie and Karate Bakabon. The lyrics of a Kinniku Shōjo Tai's song "Doko e demo Ikeru Kitte" affected the character design of Rei Ayanami, from the popular anime series Neon Genesis Evangelion. He's also performed the theme songs to several anime, including Welcome to the N.H.K., Hellsing and Sayonara Zetsubou Sensei.

== Biography ==
In primary school, Ohtsuki and classmate Yūichirō Uchida wanted to become manga artists, but they soon started to discover the big names of prog rock like King Crimson and Pink Floyd; Japanese new wave bands like YMO, Hikashu and P-Model; and the Japanese punk rock of Kenji Endo, Zunou Keisatsu, Jagatara, The Stalin and INU. Ohtsuki was greatly influenced by all these bands, and started to become interested in music. Apart from music, the manga artists that most influenced him at the time were Yoshikazu Ebisu and Daijiro Morohoshi.

In 1979, after joking around at Uchida's birthday party, they formed a band with a few friends (called "Dotechinzu", or "The Donzu"). At first none of the members could play any instruments apart from Uchida, who played the Electone keyboard. Ohtsuki tapped the rhythm with a bamboo stick. The band broke up after the members graduated from middle school.

In February 1982, him and Uchida formed the Japanese rock band Kinniku Shōjo Tai (back then called Kinniku Shōnen Shōjo Tai), with Ohtsuki in charge of lyrics, vocals and bass. At the time Kera (Keralino Sandorovich), a senior student from Uchida's high school, had just heard the tapes they'd recorded as Dotechinzu and liked them, after which he joined Ohtsuki and Uchida to form the side-project "Karate Bakabon". They released their self-titled release on Nagomu Records, the independent label run by Kera. After that, Kinniku Shoujo would also release a few albums on Nagomu. The first time they played live it became apparent that Ohtsuki couldn't play bass and sing at the same time, so he entrusted the position to Uchida, who had played keyboards up until then. Then in the second half of the '80s they signed onto a major label. The way they described themselves in their promotional slogans was with the phrase "Rockers who get their leather pants from their parents".

Ever since the beginning Ohtsuki was the band's frontman, and in order to promote the band he began appearing on All Night Nippon as a radio personality. From there he started to appear in various forms of media, even in talk shows like Tetsuko no Heya. Ohtsuki says he was extremely nervous on his first appearance on Tetsuko no Heya, and could hardly manage to answer the questions he was being asked.

While the band switched labels several times, Ohtsuki started his solo career with the project "UNDERGROUND SEARCHLIE", collaborated with bands like NINGEN-ISU, and continued with Kinniku Shoujo Tai until they disbanded in 1999. After disbanding, Ohtsuki formed a new band called "Tokusatsu". Also, he formed the band "Densha" with musicians who had helped him on his solo efforts, like Ishizuka BERA Norihiro (from qyb, Kinniku Shoujo Tai and a support member for SOFT BALLET), Obata Pump (from Scanch, and Kenji Sato (from MARCHOSIAS VAMP). Apart from that, he continued to collaborate with various musicians under names like "Ooken & Nise Tokusatsu" (Ooken & the fake Tokusatsu), "Ohtsuki Kenji & Yangusu" (Ohtsuki Kenji & Youngs) or "Ohtsuki Kenji & namae wa nandemo ii" (Ootsuki Kenji & whoever) to perform at all sorts of events. Even nowadays, he uses the side-project "Ohtsuki Kenjis" (of which he is the only fixed member) to create music for anime and tokusatsu movies, for special events and shows or to play jazz and acoustic sets.

Since 1998, he regularly hosts an event in the Shinjuku Loft Plus One called "Nohohon Gakkou" ("Nonchalant School"), to which he invites guests from the Japanese subculture to talk.

Kinniku Shōjo Tai's had dissolved partly because of bad feelings amongst some of the members, but in July 2006 they held an event called "reconciliation" and reformed. In December of that same year they played their come-back live. Then on the 25th the "Ohtsuki Kenji and Tokusatsu Fan Club" announced that Tokusatsu were disbanding. However, Ohtsuki himself later stated on his blog that it was just needed some time to "recharge their batteries". Even so, during that time all of Ohtsuki's solo projects and shows were played together with Tokusatsu members, like the Sayonara Zetsubou Sensei theme songs and live shows. In 2011, Tokusatsu reformed, released a new album and started playing live again.

Since the first half of the '90s, apart from fronting Kinniku Shōjo Tai Ohtsuki also began his literary career. He wrote various novels like "Shinkoushuukyou Omoide Kyou"("Church of Memories, a new religion"), "Gumi Chokoreeto Pain" ("Gummy Chocolate Pineapple"), or "Stacy" (which was later adapted into a film and a manga by Osada Not), and also published essays like "Ooken no nohohon nikki" ("Ooken's nonchalant diary"). His literary style is greatly influenced by the "Shōwa Keihaku Tai" genre (or "Frivolous Shōwa Style"). He's also a member of the Japanese Sci-Fi writer's club, but according to Ohtsuki himself he hardly ever turns up.

Ever since Kinniku Shōjo Tai's come-back in 2007 he has stopped writing novels, but his serialized essays and talks are still active.

== See also ==
- Kinniku Shōjo Tai
- Osada Not
