= Xanvala =

- Origin: Tokyo, Japan
- Genres: Alternative rock; metal; punk
- Years active: 2020–present
- Label: Paraguas Inc. (Starwave Records)
- Website: xanvala.com

Xanvala (pronounced "Zambara" and stylized as XANVALA) is a Japanese rock visual kei band, formed in 2020 by Tatsumi, Yuhma, Souma, 70 (Nao), and Tomoya.

== Career ==
In mid-2019, Scala started as a temporary band, consisting of vocalist Tatsumi, guitarists Souma and Yuhma, bassist 70 (Nao), and drummer Tomoya. The latter three were part of the band Cula. On December 15, 2019, it was announced that Scala would become an official band now called XANVALA. They announced their debut for January 30 with their first concert, where their first single, titled "Azayaka na Moudoku," was sold exclusively. On March 9, they released their next single, "Creeper." It was followed by "Bunmei Kaika" on April 28, composed by Souma, featuring traditional Japanese elements. It was scheduled to be sold at a concert on the same date, but it was canceled due to the COVID-19 pandemic. As a result, it was sold on the band's record label's website, Starwave. Later, they compiled these three singles into the album "Riku Jūsou", released on July 8. To get around the pandemic, they performed on live streams on YouTube.

"Xanadu" was released on December 16, 2020, as the band's first single to be sold without restriction in stores. It was followed by "Janome" on January 30. On May 3, 2021, they released the limited EP Gayoku no Maku, keeping the contents of the EP a secret. However, it was re-released without restrictions on June 2. In addition to the six tracks, the work comes with a DVD featuring the music video for the track "Hitori Butai" and a video commentary by the band.

In March 2023, they released the album NIX. On July 26, they released the digital single "Ashita, mushi ni natte mo", described as one of the band's heaviest songs to date. The single "Culture" was released on June 5 of the following year, expressing Tatsumi's passion for music and as a tribute to the musician hide. On August 28, they released their third album, Banquet, accompanied by the promotional single "Jabara", promoted by a seven-date tour the following month. In 2024, they held their annual Halloween tour from October 3 to October 31.

On April 2, 2025, they released the EP Anchor, promoted by the digital single "Ruru" released on March 5. Another EP was released shortly after; Indra debuted on September 3, with thematic influences from Hinduism and Buddhism. On November 28, they performed with Mucc on their Love Together tour.

== Musical style and themes ==
The band's name, pronounced "Zambara", means "messy hair". They have been described as alternative rock, metal, punk and, according to Royal Stage website, combining a "heavy yet melodic sound" with "dynamic guitar riffs, electronic elements, and intense vocals." The band's concept is "messy things are beautiful".

Vocalist Tatsumi mentions hide and Miyavi as influences. Bassist 70 cites D'espairsRay and its bassist Zero.

== Members ==
- Tatsumi – vocals (2020–present)
- Yuhma – guitar (2020–present)
- Souma – guitar (2020–present)
- 70. (Nao) – bass (2020–present)
- Tomoya – drums (2020–present)

== Discography ==
Albums and EPs

- Riku Jūsou (陸重奏)
- Gayoku no Maku (我慾之幕)
- Tsuki to Taiyō (月と太陽)
- NIX
- Banquet
- Anchor
- Indra

Singles

- "Azayaka na Moudoku" (鮮やかな猛毒)
- "Creeper"
- "Bunmei Kaika" (文明開花)
- "Xanadu"
- "Jenome" (ジャノメ)
- "Bamby"
- "Miikusa" (聖戰)
- "joke"
- "ANS"
- "Ruru" (縷々)
- "Culture"
- "Ningen sanka" (人間賛歌)
- "Vajra" (ヴァジュラ)
