= Undivide =

Japanese band

- Origin: Japan
- Genres: Alternative metal; melodic metalcore
- Years active: 2012-2013
- Labels: Braveman Records
- Past members: Kihiro; Leda; Sujk
- Website: www.undivide.net

Undivide (stylized as UNDIVIDE) was a Japanese visual kei metal band. It was formed in 2012 by Leda (former guitarist from Deluhi) and disbanded on 2 March 2013.

== Discography ==
=== Singles ===
- The Catalyst (8 August 2012)

=== Albums and EPs ===
- Undivide (5 September 2012)
- Materials Left Aside (5 February 2013)
