= CLJ Records =

German record label

- Parent company: Colosseum Music Entertainment
- Genre: Rock, metal
- Country of origin: Germany
- Official website: CLJRecords.com

CLJ Records is/was a German independent record label formed in 2006 specializing in Japanese visual kei style rock and metal bands. The label was never officially dissolved, but there haven't been any releases since 2012, the label's official website has expired as of 2025. The label had up to 31 bands signed, but it's likely that all of the contracts expired by 2025 as there hasn't been any updates or news from the label.

CLJ is a sub division of Colosseum Music Entertainment and their head office is located in Nuremberg Germany. In cooperation with the Japanese/German tour promotion company Rock Identity, many of the groups with material released under CLJ Records performed live on tour throughout Europe in the late 2000s.

- CLJ Records also released the compilation album J-Visual[ism] with JaME dedicated to the "next superstars" of Japanese rock, those bands are also among the listed artists under CLJ Records.

== Bands whose music has been distributed by CLJ ==
- 9Goats Black Out
- Alice Nine
- Ap(r)il
- Ayabie
- Branch
- Daizystripper
- Danger Gang
- Deluhi
- D=Out
- Kagrra,
- Kra
- LiZ
- Lynch
- Matenrou Opera
- Moran
- NoGoD
- -OZ-
- Panic Channel
- Plastic Tree
- Pure Q&A
- Screw
- Saruin
- Sug
- Tarrot [sic]
- Terashima Tamiya
- the GazettE
- Uchiike Hidekazu
- Unsraw
- Versailles
- Vistlip
- Wizard

== See also ==
- List of record labels
- List of musical artists from Japan
