= Interactional vandalism =

Concept in sociology

Interactional vandalism is a concept in sociology that describes a situation where the implied rules of conversation are not adhered to, specifically when a person of lower social status violates those rules when interacting with a person of higher social status. The term was coined in by sociologists Mitchell Duneier and Harvey Molotch in their study of interactions on the streets of New York City between black men who were panhandlers or street venders, and middle-class white women who were passing by. The study used conversation analysis to show that women were unlikely to respond to the men's comments or questions; when the men persisted despite the women's unwillingness to engage in conversation, they violated the rules of social conduct and committed interactional vandalism.
