= Yukinojo Mori =

Japanese lyricist (born 1954)

- Also known as: Joe Lemon
- Born: Masakazu Mori; January 14, 1954 (age 72); Tokyo, Japan
- Genres: Pop, rock
- Occupations: Lyricist, composer, poet
- Years active: 1970–present
- Website: www.mori-yukinojo.com

Masakazu Mori (Japanese: 森 正和), better known by his stage name Yukinojo Mori (森雪之丞, Mori Yukinojō), is a Japanese lyricist, composer and poet who is affiliated with Amuse, Inc. He has written over 2,500 songs for numerous artists such as Kyosuke Himuro, Takuro Yoshida and Junichi Inagaki and theme songs for anime series including Dragon Ball Z and Kinnikuman.

== Early life ==
Mori grew up in Tokyo, Japan, and often played music in high school with the members of the rock band Yonin Bayashi. His younger brother is Hideharu Mori, keyboardist of the rock band Picasso. Mori was influenced by The Beatles, The Rolling Stones, King Crimson, Pink Floyd and glam rock. While witnessing David Bowie's theatrical performance at Shibuya Public Hall in 1973, Mori thought rock music to be reminiscent of kabuki. Deciding to pursue not only music, but also his own expression and performance, Mori took the stage name "Yukinojo" which is used in kabuki. Mori attended the English Department of Sophia University before dropping out and making his professional songwriting debut

== Career ==
Playing guitar and piano, Mori tried his hand at becoming a singer-songwriter and took his original songs to record companies. After becoming acquainted with Yonin Bayashi's staff at Watanabe Productions, he was asked to write a song for Nana Kinomi. But as a young man in his 20s, he said there was no way he could write a song for a mature woman. He made his debut as a lyricist with The Drifters' 1976 song "Drift no Bye no Bye no Bye".

Mori's first solo album, Yukinojo Kenzan (雪之丞見参), was released in 1977. He wrote his first songs for an anime the following year; the opening and ending themes to Manga Hajimete Monogatari. In 1983, Mori wrote the theme songs to the Kinnikuman anime. He contributed a handful of lyrics to the 1989 album Appare by the Sadistic Mika Band, who temporarily reunited that year.

Mori penned the lyrics to several songs used in Dragon Ball Z (1989–1996), including its opening themes "Cha-La Head-Cha-La" and "We Gotta Power" and its second ending theme "Bokutachi wa Tenshi Datta", all three of which are performed by Hironobu Kageyama.

Mori was hired by hide of X Japan to pen the lyrics to the first two singles of his solo career, 1993's simultaneously released "Eyes Love You" and "50% & 50%". Twenty years later, the lyricist covered "Eyes Love You" himself together with Hisashi Imai of Buck-Tick for the 2013 hide tribute album Tribute VII -Rock Spirits-.

In 1996 he worked on the first solo single of another X Japan member, "Meikyuu no Lovers" by Heath, which was used as the second ending theme of the long-running Detective Conan anime.

In 1997, Mori released the album Tenshi no Ita Wakusei (天使のいた惑星) which featured Hisashi Imai on several tracks. It was followed by Poetic Evolution in 1999 which in addition to Imai also featured Teru, Takuro and Hisashi of Glay, Takuya (Judy and Mary) and Kyoji Yamamoto of Bow Wow. The album Words of Yukinojo (Words of 雪之丞) was released in 2006 as a tribute to the lyricist and contains covers of songs Mori wrote by artists such as Bonnie Pink and Porno Graffitti.

The songwriter returned to Dragon Ball in 2009 when he wrote "Kuu•Zen•Zetsu•Go" as the opening theme for Dragon Ball Kai. For 2015's Fukkatsu no F film, he wrote lyrics inspired by the series for its theme song "Z no Chikai". That year he also penned "Chōzetsu☆Dynamic!" by Kazuya Yoshii of The Yellow Monkey, which is the first opening theme song of Dragon Ball Super. Mori also wrote the lyrics to its second opening theme, 2017's "Genkai Toppa × Survivor", a rock song by enka singer Kiyoshi Hikawa with music composed by Takafumi Iwasaki.

Mori wrote the script for the 2012 rock opera Psychedelic Pain after being convinced to do so by his friend Tomoyasu Hotei, who served as musical director.

In 2013 he wrote "V.S. Myself", Show-Ya's first single since reuniting in 2005. That year he also wrote the single "Kiss or Bite" off of Meg's album Continue.

== Selected credits ==
- "Shiroi Honō" (1985)
- "Kanashimi yo Konnichi wa" (1986)
- "Cha-La Head-Cha-La" (1989)
- "Eyes Love You" (1993)
- "50% & 50%" (1993)
- "Power Up Turtles" (1996)
- "Z no Chikai" (2015)
- "Chōzetsu☆Dynamic!" (2015)
- "Jaka Jaan" (2025)
