= Lynch (band) =

Japanese nagoya kei metal band

lynch.

Background information
- Origin: Nagoya, Japan
- Genres: Metalcore; alternative metal; nu metal
- Years active: 2004–2021; 2022–present
- Labels: Marginal Works (2005–2010); King Records (2011–present); JPU (Outside Japan)
- Members: Hazuki; Reo; Asanao; Yusuke; Akinori
- Website: pc.lynch.jp

Lynch (stylized as lynch.) is a Japanese visual kei metal band formed in 2004. The band's concept is "uniting heavy music with beautiful melodies." As of 2023, the group has released three EPs, twelve albums, and 25 singles.

== History ==
Lynch was formed in 2004 when Reo (ex-Gullet) joined with Hazuki (formerly in Deathgaze) and Asanao in Nagoya, Japan. With Yukino (formerly in Deadman) as a support bassist, they released their first album on the label Marginal Works and toured nationally. In 2006, Yusuke joined as a second guitarist.

On October 11, 2007, the band signed to CLJ Records, a European record label dedicated to releasing Japanese rock artists abroad. From 2012 Lynch were signed to Okami Records. From 2023 Lynch joined JPU Records for their international releases. Their music is available worldwide ever since then.

In 2009, Lynch went on a three-man tour with heidi. and Sadie. On May 27, 2009, they announced via their official site the release of their fourth full-length album, Shadows, which was released on July 8, 2009.

In July 2010, the band announced they would be joining a major label, although the exact label had not been specified. To coincide with signing onto a major label, the band started their last tour titled "The Judgement Days" on their independent label in September 2010. Lynch announced that Hazuki would not be participating in tour due to being diagnosed with "acute pharyngitis and laryngitis, accompanied by swelling of the vocal chords." Lynch proceeded with the tour without Hazuki and gave out ticket refunds where Hazuki was not present. At the final show of the tour on December 19, Akinori, until then a support bassist, became Lynch's official bassist.

In June 2011, the album "I Believe In Me" became Lynch's first release on their new major record label, King Records.

In December 2013, Lynch went on their first Zepp live tour in Tokyo, Nagoya, and Osaka. In February 2014, the Lynch official fan club "Shadows" was established.

In November 2016, bassist Akinori was arrested for marijuana possession and subsequently decided to leave the band. Following his decision, the band went on an immediate hiatus on December 20. The EP "Sinners" was released in May 2017, featuring guest bassists including J, Yukke (Mucc) and Yoshihiro Yasui (Outrage). lynch. covered "XXX for You" by D'erlanger for the D'erlanger Tribute Album ~Stairway to Heaven~ in September.

At their 13th anniversary performance on March 31, 2018, Akinori reunited with the band on stage. They subsequently re-recorded the bass for all tracks from the Sinners EP and "Bløod Thirsty Creature" single with Akinori and released Sinners -No One Can Fake My Bløod- EP on April 25, 2018. On July 11, 2018, they released an album entitled XIII to commemorate their 13th anniversary.

In the middle of the COVID-19 pandemic in 2020, lynch carried out a beneficial campaign for the music venues of Japan with the single "Overcome the Virus". The money raised from the single, about 11 million yen, was donated to 149 venues. In December 2021, the band announced that they'd pause activities after their 17th anniversary concert on December 31 at Zepp Nagoya. All members continue to perform in other bands: vocalist Hazuki restarted his solo activities, guitarist Reo restarted his old band Kein, guitarist Yusuke continued playing with his other band Ken-Ko, bassist Akinori formed Vivace, and drummer Asanao continued supporting Deadman.

On September 1, 2022, the band announced their return with a concert at the Nippon Budokan on November 23.

In 2025, lynch. released 2 retakes albums to celebrate their 20th anniversary. They released “GREEDY DEAD SOULS/UNDERNEATH THE SKIN” in April and “THE AVOIDED SUN / SHADOWS” in September. The decision came from proving their unity as a band, with their current lineup:

If you ask most people today what they imagine when they think of lynch.‘s sound, especially from our live performances, it’s Akinori’s bass that defines that image. It’s hard to explain in concrete terms, but the truth is: when a member changes, the sound changes — and when the sound of one person shifts, the entire ensemble adjusts. The way we hear each other, the way we interact musically, it all transforms. So, if someone asks me, “What is lynch. now?” — I’d say it’s the lynch. that exists with Akinori’s bass at the core. His presence redefines the band’s foundation in a very real, very organic way. - Guitarist Reo for VMJ (Mandah Frénot).

== Members ==
- Hazuki (葉月) – lead vocals (2004–present), bass (studio only, 2004–2010, 2017)
- Reo (玲央) – lead guitar, backing vocals (2004–present)
- Asanao (晁直) – drums (2004–present)
- Yusuke (悠介) – rhythm guitar, backing vocals (2006–present)
- Akinori (明徳) - bass, backing vocals (2010-2016, 2018–present)

Live members

- Yukino (ゆきの) – bass (support, 2004–2006, 2017)
- Hikaru (光輝) – bass (support, 2006–2007)
- Junji (淳児) – bass (support, 2007–2010)
- Ryo – bass (support, 2017)
- Hitoki – bass (support, 2017)
- Natsuki – bass (support, 2017)

== Discography ==
=== Albums ===
- Greedy Dead Souls (April 20, 2005)
- The Avoided Sun (April 25, 2007)
- The Buried (November 7, 2007)
- Shadows (July 8, 2009)
- I Believe in Me (June 1, 2011)
- Inferiority Complex (June 27, 2012)
- Gallows (April 9, 2014)
- D.A.R.K.: In the Name of Evil (October 7, 2015)
- Avantgarde (September 14, 2016)
- XIII (July 11, 2018)
- Ultima (March 18, 2020)
- Reborn (March 1, 2023)
- Greedy Dead Souls (April 30, 2025)
- The Avoided Sun (September 24, 2025)
- Shadows (September 24, 2025)
- Climax (July 1, 2026)

=== EPs ===
- Underneath the Skin (November 16, 2005)
- Exodus (August 14, 2013)
- Sinners (May 31, 2017)
- Sinners: No One Can Fake My Blood (April 25, 2018)
- Fierce-EP (June 26, 2024)
- Underneath the Skin (April 30, 2025)
- God Only Knows (April 30, 2025)

=== Singles ===
- "A Grateful Shit" (July 20, 2006)
- "Roaring in the Dark" (November 15, 2006)
- "Enemy" (December 13, 2006)
- "Forgiven" (January 17, 2007)
- "Adore" (April 2, 2008)
- "Ambivalent Ideal" (October 15, 2008)
- "A Gleam in Eye" (April 28, 2010)
- "Judgement" (September 22, 2010)
- "Mirrors" (November 9, 2011)
- "Lightning" (October 24, 2012)
- "Ballad" (February 20, 2013)
- "Anathema" (July 13, 2013)
- "Evoke" (August 5, 2015)
- "Eternity" (September 2, 2015)
- "Blood Thirsty Creature" (November 8, 2017)
- "Creature" (November 11, 2017)
- "Xero" (March 18, 2020)
- "Allive" (digital single, December 23, 2020)

=== Videography ===
- Official Bootleg (February 23, 2008)
- Official Bootleg 2 (March 1, 2009)
- The Shadow Impulse (December 12, 2009)
- Official Bootleg 3 (March 5, 2011)
- Il Inferno (February 8, 2012)
- To the Gallows (September 10, 2014)
- The Decade of Greed (January 13, 2016)
- Immortality (June 15, 2016)
- The Five Blackest Crows (August 8, 2018)

=== Live ===
- "Toward The Avoided Sunrise Final Live @ Shibuya 0-West" (March 1, 2008)
- "The Diffusing Ideal Live @ Liquid Room" (October 24, 2008)
- "The Shadow Impulse Final Live @ Akasaka Blitz" (September 6, 2009)
- "The Belief in Myself Final: Il inferno" (February 8, 2012)
- "TOUR'14「TO THE GALLOWS」-ABSOLUTE XANADU-04．23 SHIBUYA-AX(通常版)" (September 10, 2014)
- "HALL TOUR'15「THE DECADE OF GREED」-05.08 SHIBUYA KOKAIDO-" (January 13, 2016)
- "IMMORTALITY" (June 15, 2016)
- "13th ANNIVERSARY -XIII GALLOWS- [THE FIVE BLACKEST CROWS] 18.03.11 MAKUHARI MESSE" (August 8, 2018)
