= Hazuki (singer) =

- Born: December 10, 1982 (age 43)
- Origin: Kasugai, Aichi, Japan
- Occupation: Singer-songwriter
- Instruments: Vocals, guitar, bass, drums
- Years active: 1998–present
- Website: hazuki-xanadu.jp

Hazuki (葉月) (Kasugai, December 10, 1982) is a Japanese singer, songwriter and musician, known for being the vocalist and main songwriter of visual kei band Lynch.

In addition to singing, Hazuki also plays bass, guitar and drums. He occasionally streams games on his YouTube channel.

== Career ==
Before entering high school, Hazuki played his first concert with friends at a hall in his hometown, where about 100 people attended. He played covers of Kuroyume and L'Arc-en-Ciel. At age 17, he became vocalist of Kusse, until 1999. In 2001 Hazuki formed the band Berry with two of his former bandmates, Yairi and Naoki, and released the EP Hakuchi in November 2002. Berry played their last live on July 4, 2003, and in the same month Hazuki and Naoki formed Deathgaze. However, he was invited by guitarist Reo and drummer Asanao to form a new band in 2004, and in April lynch was born.

In early 2005, Lynch played their first shows and on April 20 they released their debut album, greedy dead souls. Before Akinori officially joined in 2010, they relied on support bassists, but occasionally Hazuki himself recorded the bass lines. Lynch joined a major label in 2010, but Hazuki had to be away for most of their celebration tour due to laryngitis. In 2013, he collaborated with Pay money To my Pain with vocals on the track "Resurrection", included on gene album.

Hazuki held his first solo concert in 2016, titled Souen. On October 1, he was a surprise guest at a Sads concert. The following year he founded the brand Urge (Undefined Rebel Gothic Element), which produces accessories and t-shirts. In 2020, he participated in Mucc's album Aku, singing with Tatsuro on the track "Memai". Later, on September 16, he released his first solo album, Souen -Funeral-. It includes covers by various artists such as Kuroyume, Buck-Tick and Luna Sea and reached number nine on the Oricon Daily Chart.

Lynch went on hiatus on December 31, 2021. The vocalist reported that he was having trouble writing songs for the band. He resumed his solo career and on August 12, 2022, the music video for the song "Shichiseki no Rai", directed by Masaki Okita, aired on his YouTube channel. On August 31, Hazuki released the album Egoist in Japan and the UK via JPU Records. Guitarist Pablo (Pay money to my Pain) collaborated on the album, who had already gave support on Souen -Funeral-. An autograph session took place on September 4 at Tower Records in Shinjuku.

== Personal life ==
Hazuki was born in Kasugai on December 10, 1982. His parents divorced early and he was raised by his grandparents. Joined high school at Nagakute High School, but did not graduate. He was president of the high school's badminton club and worked at a convenience store part-time. Some of the singer's hobbies are fishing, tattoos and video games.

=== Influences ===
Hazuki is a self-confessed fan of visual kei bands, and the first one he listened was Luna Sea. After listening to Kuroyume, he was inspired by their vocalist Kiyoharu and became a singer. His compositions are heavily influenced by Western music, and the non-Japanese bands he cites as an influence are Skid Row and Pantera.

== Discography ==
Studio albums

Title	Release	Oricon peak position		
Title	Release	Weekly	Daily	Indies
Souen -Funeral-	September 16, 2020	15	9	–
EGØIST	August 31, 2022	29	–	
MAKE UP ØVERKILL	October 23, 2024			–

Singles

Title	Release	Oricon peak position		
Souen 蒼炎	May 28, 2017	–	–	–
XANADU/HEROIN(E)	April 25, 2022	–	–	–
+ULTRA / AM I A LØSER?	April 25, 2022	–	–	–
蓮華鏡" (Rengekyou)	January 25, 2023	–	–	–
逆鱗 (Gekirin)	July 9, 2023	–	–	–
逆鱗+ (Gekirin+)	September 15, 2023	–	–	–
CHAINSAW / 東京彩景 -TOKYO PSYCHE	February 27, 2024	–	–	–
