= Vandalism (album) =

Studio album by Deluhi
- Released: July 27, 2011
- Genre: Alternative metal
- Length: 56:45
- Label: Braveman Records
- Producer: Yo-suke Tsuchiya

Vandalism is the only studio album by Japanese visual kei band Deluhi. The album peaked #87 in the Oricon charts and charted for two weeks.

== Track listing ==
Track list
| No. | Title | Length |
|---|---|---|
| 1. | "HYBRID TRUTH" | 3:48 |
| 2. | "Two Hurt" | 4:05 |
| 3. | "G.A.L.D" | 4:24 |
| 4. | "REVOLVER BLAST" | 3:13 |
| 5. | "Shade" | 4:29 |
| 6. | "LORELEI" | 5:07 |
| 7. | "Yomi no Yuzuriha (黄泉の譲り葉)" | 6:21 |
| 8. | "Vivid Place" | 5:13 |
| 9. | "Rebel:Sicks, Shadow:Six" | 4:51 |
| 10. | "Baby play" | 4:24 |
| 11. | "s[K]ape:goat" | 3:44 |
| 12. | "Orion once again" | 4:39 |
| 13. | "Suna no Izumi (砂の泉)" | 4:27 |
| Total length: | | 56:45 |

Vandalism Sigma (Σ) bonus track
| No. | Title | Length |
|---|---|---|
| 14. | "Frontier" | 4:38 |
| 15. | "The Farthest" | 6:07 |
| 16. | "Departure" | 5:02 |
| Total length: | | 72:32 |

== Single information ==
- "Revolver Blast"

Released: March 24, 2010
Oricon Chart peak position: #51

- "Two Hurt"

Released: August 5, 2009
Oricon Chart peak position: #114
