= Deathgaze =

Japanese visual kei metal band

- Also known as: Knohhoso
- Origin: Nagoya, Japan
- Genres: Alternative metal; metalcore; gothic metal; Deathcore (early)
- Years active: 2003–present
- Label: Enter Brain
- Members: Ai; Takaki; Kosuke; Naoki
- Past members: Hazuki; Kanna; Sou; Naoto
- Website: deathgaze.jp

Deathgaze (デスゲイズ, Desugeizu) is a Japanese visual kei metal band formed in 2003.

== History ==
Deathgaze was formed in the summer of 2003 by Hazuki, Ai, Naoki, and Kanna. After releasing their first EP called 「294036224052」, Hazuki, the band's vocalist, left in spring 2004 to form his own band, Lynch. Guitarist Kanna also left in 2004. As replacements, vocalist Sou and guitarist Naoto joined the group in late 2004. The band released several more singles and their first album, before Sou left in late 2006 to elope. Despite not having a vocalist, the band did a tour with the band girugamesh titled "Girugaze&Deathgamesh", with bassist Ai and girugamesh vocalist Satoshi sharing vocal duties. In March 2007, the band announced they would be on hiatus while searching for a new vocalist.

On November 11, 2007, the band officially ended their hiatus with Ai assuming lead vocal duties while still playing bass. They continued as a three-piece until April 2008 when Kosuke joined the band as the new bassist, relieving Ai of bass duties. On April 26, 2009, guitarist Naoto retired from the band and from music, but stated in the future he would return if it was possible. After Naoto's retirement, Takaki (ex. ASS'n'ARROW) played live support guitar for the band, while Ai contributed guitar work to their latest album The Continuation and the single "Blood". Takaki was added as an official member on November 20, 2009. From 2010 onwards, Ai took up rhythm guitar in some of the band's songs.

As of 2012, Deathgaze has released five albums and several singles. Ai is the main composer and lyricist of the band and is also in charge of art direction for their CD releases. From 2003 to 2007 the band also performed under the session name Knohhoso (野っ細), playing cover songs of older and popular Japanese rock bands. Knohhoso also featured Ai on vocals.

On March 23, 2013, Deathgaze announced that they would be playing in venues all around Europe for their European Tour to commemorate their 10th anniversary. This included cities such as Paris, Wrocław, Hamburg, Vienna and more.

On October 2, 2014, the band officially announced an indefinite hiatus and ceased their activities for the rest of the year. Every member would later pursue their own projects. Ai started his own solo project "AI" and is currently in the band DARRELL. Takaki joined ORCALADE, while Kousuke joined Unveil Raze until they entered a hiatus. Naoki started the band DEXCORE, but eventually departed due to "difference in opinion".

On August 4, 2023, the band reunited for a live studio performance of "Blood" which was released on drummer Naoki's Youtube channel, and later organized concerts in Nagoya to celebrate their 20th anniversary.

== Members ==
- Ai (藍) – lead vocals (2007–2014), rhythm guitar (2009–2014), bass, backing vocals (2003–2008)
- Naoki (直樹) – drums (2003–2014)
- Kosuke (孝介) – bass, backing vocals (2008–2014)
- Takaki (貴樹) – lead guitar, backing vocals (2009–2014)

Former members

- Hazuki (葉月) – lead vocals (2003–2004)
- Kanna (柑那) – guitars (2003–2004)
- Sou (宗) – lead vocals (2004–2006)
- Naoto (直人) – guitars (2004-2009)

== Discography ==
Albums

- Genocide and Mass Murder (July 16, 2006)
- Awake -Evoke the Urge- (December 10, 2008)
- The Continuation (September 9, 2009)
- Bliss Out (December 8, 2010)
- Creature (April 4, 2012)
- ENIGMA (July 23, 2014)

EPs

- "「294036224052」" (February 22, 2004)
- "genocidal freaks death code=[2F0U0C6K1E2R1!0]" (December 10, 2006)

Compilations

- Decade (July 7, 2013) (Best of, containing seven re-recorded tracks and a new song)

Singles

- "Chaos" (February 5, 2005)
- "Chaos Vol. 2" (August 17, 2005)
- "Downer" (November 11, 2005)
- "腐敗と腐生"(Fuhai to Fusei) (April 1, 2006)
- "Insult Kiss Me" (January 23, 2008)
- "Dearest" (February 20, 2008)
- "I'm Broken Baby" (March 19, 2008)
- "Abyss" (July 24, 2008)
- "Blood" (November 18, 2009)
- "Sorrow" (May 26, 2010)
- "Silence/The End" (May 7, 2011)
- "Useless Sun" (November 2, 2011)
- "Dead Blaze" (November 21, 2012)
- "Allure" (May 22, 2013)
- "THE UNDERWORLD" (December 18, 2013)

Omnibus

- Hevn.8号 - "リヒトゾイレ"(Lichtsäule) (November, 2003)
- Nagoya Band Catalog 2006 Rebels - "Reborn" (July 19, 2006)
- Visualy[zm] The Cure Century - "Insult Kiss Me" (July 30, 2008)

Live

- Bloody All Lovers (March 22, 2010)
- Bliss Out Mind -From the End- (February 22, 2012)
