= Hide (musician) =

Japanese musician (1964–1998)

Hide 松本 秀人
- Hide during the Last Live with X Japan, 1997

Background information
- Born: Hideto Matsumoto; December 13, 1964; Yokosuka, Kanagawa, Japan
- Died: May 2, 1998 (aged 33) Minami-Azabu, Minato, Tokyo, Japan
- Genres: Alternative rock; heavy metal; industrial rock
- Occupations: Musician; singer; songwriter; record producer
- Instruments: Vocals; guitar
- Works: Hide discography
- Years active: 1981–1998
- Labels: MCA Victor; Universal; LEMONed
- Formerly of: X Japan; Zilch; M*A*S*S; Saver Tiger
- Website: www.hide-city.com

Japanese name
- Kanji: 松本 秀人
- Hiragana: まつもと ひでと
Transcriptions
- Romanization: Matsumoto Hideto

Hideto Matsumoto (Japanese: 松本 秀人, Hepburn: Matsumoto Hideto; December 13, 1964 – May 2, 1998), known professionally as Hide, (Note: Japanese pronunciation: [çide̞]. His stage name is written in all capital English alphabet letters (HIDE) while in regard to his work with X Japan, but in all lowercase letters (hide) when talking of his solo career and work with Zilch.) was a Japanese musician, singer, songwriter, and record producer. He achieved international fame as the lead guitarist of the rock band X Japan from 1987 to 1997 and rose to prominence in Asia as a solo artist from 1993 to 1998, until his death. He also formed the United States–based rock supergroup Zilch in 1996.

Hide sold millions of records, both solo and as a member of X Japan. X Japan rose to prominence in the late 1980s and early 1990s, credited as founders of the Japanese visual kei movement. When they disbanded in 1997, he focused on his solo career which started four years prior and went on to enjoy significant popularity. At the height of his fame, while recording his third studio album and about to launch an international career with the newly formed Zilch, he died in 1998 of what was ruled a suicide by hanging. He was seen as an icon for Japanese youth rebelling against their country's conformist society, and his death was labeled "the end of an era".

== Life and career ==
=== 1964–1987: Early years and Saver Tiger ===
Hideto Matsumoto was born at St. Joseph's Hospital in Midorigaoka, Japan, on December 13, 1964, and attended Yokosuka Tokiwa Junior High School. He was first exposed to rock music at the age of fifteen, through the album Alive II by Kiss. That year his grandmother bought him his first electric guitar, a Gibson Les Paul Deluxe.

On March 11, 1980, Hide graduated from Tokiwa Junior High School. He entered Zushi Kaisei Senior High School in Zushi, Kanagawa, where he entered the school's brass band as a club activity. He quit the band after a short time because he was assigned the clarinet while he wanted to play the trumpet. After this, he concentrated on guitar and in 1981 formed the band Saber Tiger. A year after their founding, they started playing shows at live houses in Yokosuka, such as Rock City. Their live performances featured shock elements such as mannequins and raw meat.

In April 1983, Hide started studying cosmetology and fashion at the Hollywood University of Beauty and Fashion in present-day Roppongi Hills, from which he graduated in 1985. Later that year he took a nationwide examination and obtained a beautician license. In July 1985 Saber Tiger released their self-titled EP, which included two songs, "Double Cross" and "Gold Digger". In November, the band contributed the song "Vampire" to the Heavy Metal Force III sampler, which also included songs by X.

In 1986 the group changed its name to Saver Tiger to avoid confusion with Saber Tiger from Sapporo. Their first appearance with the new name was on the sampler Devil Must Be Driven out with Devil, with their songs "Dead Angle" and "Emergency Express". They continued to perform in venues such as Meguro Rock-May-Kan, Omiya Freaks and Meguro Live Station until January 28, 1987, when Hide became tired of changing members and decided to end the band (vocalist Kyo and drummer Tetsu would both go on to D'erlanger), around the same time he was invited to join X. In 2001, Nippon Crown issued a three-volume release titled Origin of hide, with the band credited as "Yokosuka Saver Tiger". Volumes 1 and 2 were live CDs, with some rehearsal recordings, while volume 3 was a concert VHS.

=== 1987–1997: X Japan ===
Hide joined X in February 1987, becoming the lead guitarist and occasional songwriter. X released their first album, Vanishing Vision, through drummer Yoshiki's own Extasy Records on April 14, 1988, and toured extensively in support of the record. They became one of the first Japanese acts to achieve mainstream success on an independent label, and were later widely credited as one of the pioneers of visual kei.

X's major label debut album, Blue Blood, was released on April 21, 1989, and debuted at number six on the Oricon chart. Its success earned the band the "Grand Prix New Artist of the Year" award at the 4th annual Japan Gold Disc Awards in 1990. Their third album Jealousy was released on July 1, 1991, and debuted at number one, selling over 600,000 copies. It was later certified million by the RIAJ.

Shortly after the release of Art of Life, which also topped the Oricon, the members of X Japan took a break, to start solo projects. Around that time, the group also dropped most of its original visual kei aesthetics, except Hide who would still perform in wildly colorful outfits and with his trademark red, later pink, hair. Dahlia, which would become the band's final album to date, was released on November 4, 1996, and once again, it reached the number one spot. In September 1997 it was announced that X Japan would disband, they performed their farewell show, aptly titled "The Last Live", at the Tokyo Dome on December 31, 1997.

=== 1993–1998: Solo career ===
In early 1993, Hide recorded the "cyborg rock" song "Frozen Bug" with Inoran and J of Luna Sea under the band name M*A*S*S; it was included on the sampler Dance 2 Noise 004. He also starred in an art film titled Seth et Holth, along with Tusk of Zi:Kill. In 1994, he recorded and released his first solo album Hide Your Face, which reached number 9 on the Oricon chart. The album's musical style differed significantly from the speed metal anthems and power ballads of X Japan, leaning more towards alternative rock. He then went on the Hide Our Psychommunity Tour, for which a live band was hired that would later become his primary project, Hide with Spread Beaver.

In 1996, Hide oversaw the production of the first release on his own record label LEMONed, an album from the band Zeppet Store. Prior to starting his own label, Hide would introduce bands he liked to Yoshiki, who then signed them to Extasy Records, as he had done with Zi:Kill, Luna Sea and Glay. Oblivion Dust also credits early support from Hide for them getting a record deal. Hide's second solo album Psyence was released on September 2, it topped the Oricon and was followed by the Psyence a Go Go tour. He also formed a new band named Zilch in 1996, which apart from him and Spread Beaver programmer and percussionist I.N.A., was composed of American and British artists, such as Joey Castillo (Danzig), Paul Raven (Killing Joke) and Ray McVeigh (ex-The Professionals). After X Japan disbanded in 1997, he formally titled his solo project Hide with Spread Beaver, with his backing band considered full members. On August 26, 1997, he produced the Mix LEMONed Jelly event at four different Tokyo nightclubs on the same night.

== Death ==
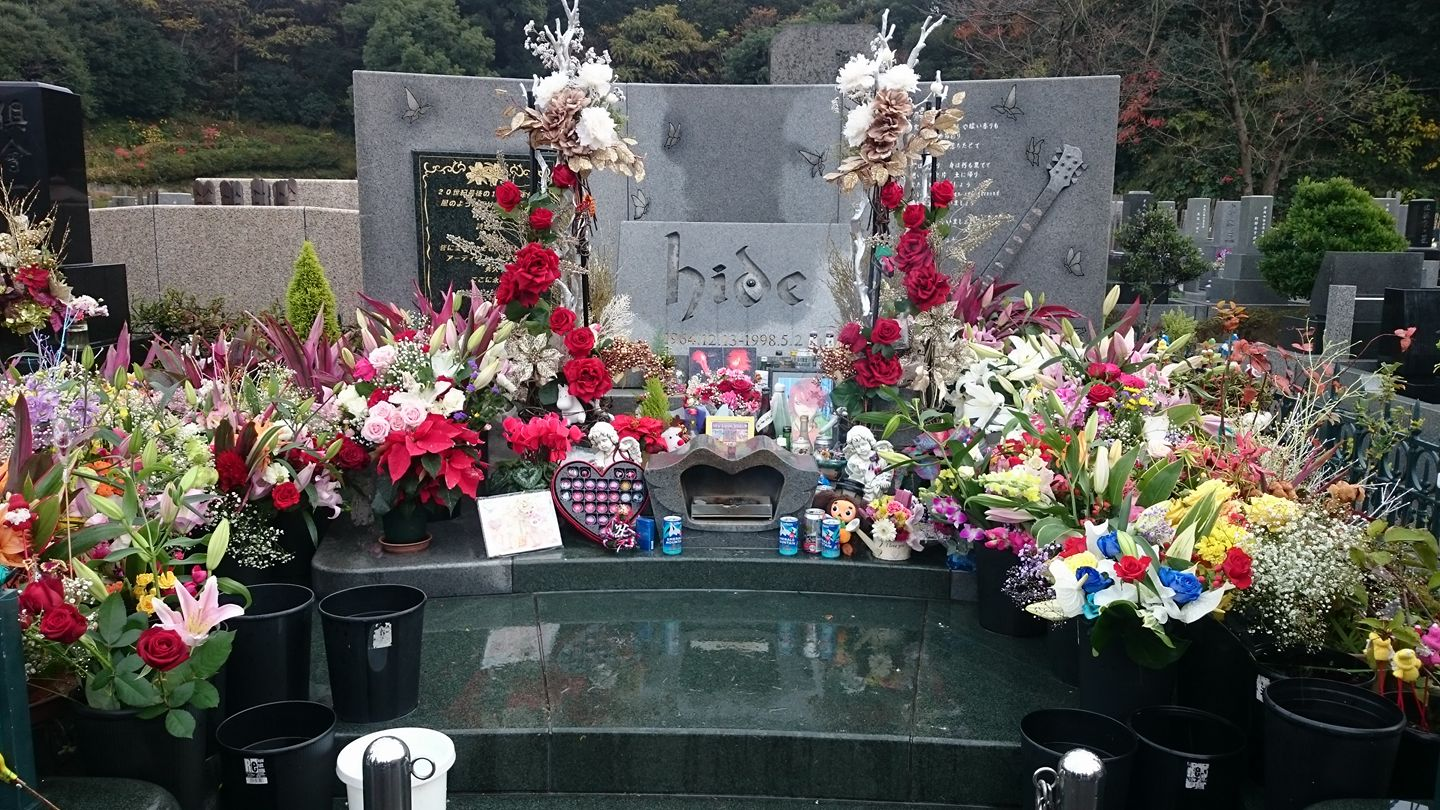
Hide's grave in Miura, Kanagawa

On May 1, Hide and the members of Spread Beaver recorded for television shows and went out drinking. Hide's younger brother drove him home at roughly 6:30 the following morning. He had returned to Japan five days earlier, after a three-month stay in Los Angeles. At 7:30 the following morning, he was found unconscious, hanged by a towel tied to a doorhandle in his apartment in the Minami-Azabu district of Tokyo. He was rushed to Japanese Red Cross Medical Center in Hiroo, where he was pronounced dead at 8:52 am by Japanese Red Cross Medical Center. He was 33.

Within a week, three teenage fans had died in copycat suicides. At the wake on May 6, which 10,000 people attended, a 19-year-old girl slit her wrists after laying flowers at the temple, and a car crash caused by sleep-deprived fans traveling from Osaka caused one death and seven serious injuries on a motorway. His remains were buried in Miura Reien in Miura, Kanagawa during a Buddhist memorial service. Approximately 50,000 people attended his funeral at Tsukiji Hongan-ji on May 7, where 56 people were hospitalized and 197 people received medical treatment in first aid tents due to a mixture of emotional exhaustion and heat, with the funeral taking place on the warmest day of the year so far, at 27 degrees Celsius (about 80.6 degrees Fahrenheit).

Authorities deemed Hide's death a suicide, and it was reported in the media as such. Several of Hide's friends and colleagues stated that they believed the strangulation to have been an accident, among them X Japan co-founder Yoshiki and former X bassist Taiji. No suicide note was left. Taiji theorizes in his autobiography that Hide may have been practicing a technique to relieve upper back and neck pains which guitarists can suffer from due to continuous use of a shoulder strap. The technique required the use of a towel and a doorknob or handle. According to Taiji, Hide may have fallen asleep in his intoxicated state, becoming caught and strangling himself.

Zilch bassist Paul Raven said, "I saw him a few days before he passed away, and I had no indication from him that anything was wrong, other than that he was exhausted," but commented that Hide was "under a lot of stress," due to the recording schedule for the Ja, Zoo album. He questioned the ultimate degree of Hide's involvement in the finished record, remarking that only three songs had been completed before he died. However, Hide's younger brother and manager stated in his 2010 book that six songs were completed by the time of his death. This is supported by the fact that I.N.A. is credited with additional arrangement on four of the album's ten tracks.

== Posthumous ==
=== 1998–2010 ===
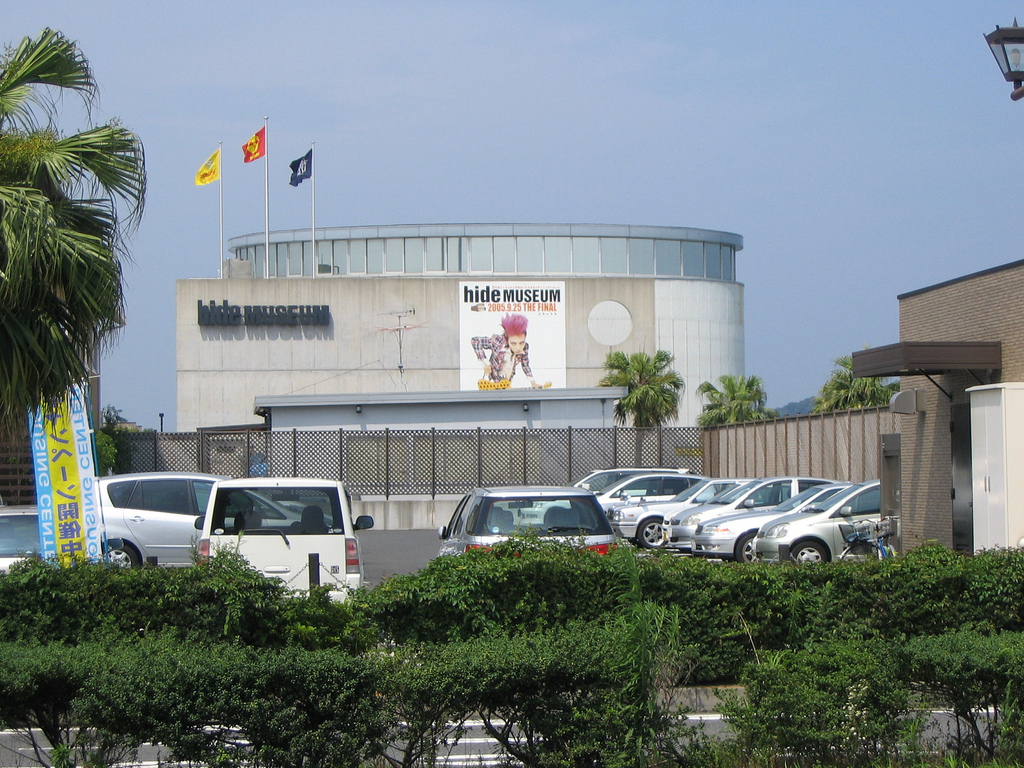
The Hide Museum in Yokosuka

Later that month after his death, the single "Pink Spider" was released, entering the Oricon chart at number one. The song was also named "Song of the Year" at the 13th Japan Gold Disc Awards and received the MTV Video Music Award in the category "Japan Viewers Choice". Sales were also strong for the follow-up single "Ever Free" which took its number one spot, while those of the single released prior to his death "Rocket Dive" would also see a substantial increase. American Journalist Neil Strauss commented on the trend saying that: "In just a few weeks, pop culture in Japan had gone from mourning Hide's death to consuming it."

Zilch's debut album 3.2.1. was released in July and reached number 2 on the Oricon chart. Zilch performed and recorded for several years. While they never achieved mainstream success in the United States, one of their songs was included on the soundtrack for the Canadian film Heavy Metal 2000. Ja, Zoo was released in November that year with the artist listed as 'hide with Spread Beaver', formally crediting his backing band, also reached the number 2 position and sold over a million copies by the end of the following year. Despite Hide's death, Spread Beaver went through with the 1998 Tribal Ja, Zoo Tour from October through November, performing live with the addition of recordings, drawing an audience of 50,000 people. Footage from the tour was later released on DVD in 2005.

On May 1, 1999, a tribute album was released, titled Tribute Spirits. It features covers by bands such as Buck-Tick, Luna Sea and Oblivion Dust, and solo artists including Tomoyasu Hotei and Cornelius. The album was released to coincide with the first anniversary of his death.

A Hide museum was opened in his hometown of Yokosuka on July 20, 2000. It has been reported that Japan's Prime Minister at the time, Junichiro Koizumi, was influential in getting it built as he is a big fan of X Japan. The museum remained open, past its original three-year plan, for five years, before closing its doors on September 25, 2005, with an estimated 400,000 people visiting.

Prior to his death, Hide and Yoshiki talked about restarting X Japan with a new vocalist in the year 2000. The surviving members of X Japan eventually reunited in 2007 and recorded a new song, "I.V.". It contains a previously unused guitar track by Hide. Their first concert was held at the Tokyo Dome on March 28, 2008, during the performance of "Art of Life" a hologram of Hide (taken from footage of an "Art of Life" performance at the Tokyo Dome in 1993) played alongside the band. X Japan still considers Hide a member, and have introduced him at every concert they have performed since reuniting.

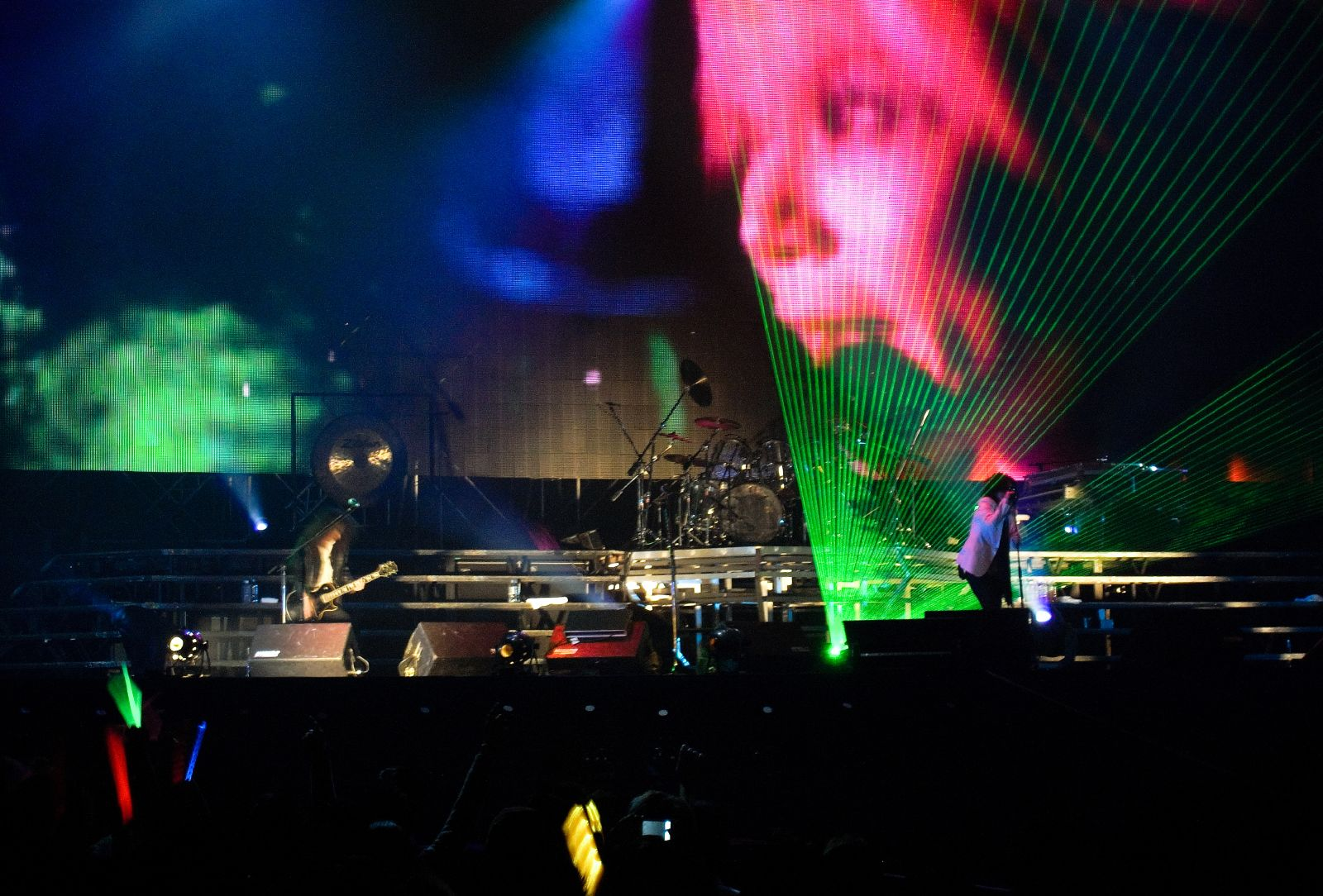
X Japan performing in 2009 with an image of Hide in the background. Despite his death, they still consider him a member of the band.

As far back as July 8, 2007, Yoshiki announced to be in talks with several musicians regarding a Hide tribute concert set for 2008, in order to commemorate the tenth anniversary of his former bandmate's death. The Hide memorial summit was held on May 3 and 4, 2008, at Ajinomoto Stadium, with X Japan, Dir En Grey, D'espairsRay, Versailles and many others performing, Luna Sea and Phantasmagoria even reunited for one day to perform. Hide with Spread Beaver also performed, using studio and live recordings for Hide's vocals. Organizers planned for an estimated 100,000 fans to attend the two shows. Prior to the summit, there had been tribute shows held every year since 2000, where bands performed on Hide's birthday and this continues to this day.

As with many other deceased musicians, re-issues, remixes, compilations and previously unreleased portions of Hide's work continue to be published. One of the most recent being "The Devolution Project", a release of his original eleven singles on picture disc vinyl, throughout 2010. On the 12th anniversary of his death, also in 2010, a memorial service was held at Tsukiji Hongan-ji with an estimated 35,000 people attending.

In August 2010, Hide's management company Headwax Organization, which includes his younger brother Hiroshi, filed a lawsuit against Yoshiki's management Japan Music Agency, for using images of the former X Japan guitarist without a formal agreement in place. The claim states that in 2000 the two companies signed an agreement allowing Yoshiki and X Japan to use visual images of Hide during concerts. However, images were used at X Japan's August 14 and 15 shows at Nissan Stadium, when apparently the contract had expired.

=== Since 2011 ===
On March 8, 2011, a jukebox musical based on and featuring Hide's music debuted, named Pink Spider after his song of the same name. Hide had previously expressed his desire to make a"rock opera", and said that the story of Pink Spider is not finished in the single, it remains open, and the musical aims to follow this thought thread. The show stars both Nao Minamisawa and Hitomi Takahashi as Meru, a girl who likes rock music, struggling between the real world and a fictional one called Psychocommunity. Other cast members included Taka (defspiral) and J, with the backing band being the rest of defspiral. The production ran from March 8 to the 27 at the Tokyo Globe Theater and was then brought to Fukuoka, Kobe, Nagoya, Niigata, Sendai, and Sapporo in April. The musical production was overseen by I.N.A. A compilation album of the songs used in the musical (the original versions by hide) was released on March 2 and is titled "Musical Number" -Rock Musical Pink Spider-.

At the end of 2012, a special project titled Hide Rocket Dive 2013~2014 ~20th Solo Works & 50th of Birth Anniversary was announced. It includes films shown in several locations on May 2, including some overseas, the re-opening of the Hide museum and plans to hold another Hide memorial summit festival. Two tribute albums, following the first in 1999, were released on July 3, 2013, and contain twenty-five tracks covered by newer visual kei acts such as heidi., Sadie, Matenrou Opera and Screw. Two more tribute albums were released on August 28, the first being covers of Hide's songs in a classical music theme, and the latter his song's remixed by Spread Beaver member INA. Two additional tribute albums were released on December 18 as the final installments, one composed of covers by female recording artists such as Koda Kumi and Kanon Wakeshima, and the other by rock acts including D'erlanger and Kinniku Shōjo Tai. The Hide Museum 2013 was in Odaiba from June 27 to July 28, when it moved to Universal Studios Japan in Osaka for August 7 to September 8. The exhibition include life size wax dolls of hide. The new live concert film hide Alive the Movie -hide Indian Summer Special Limited Edition- was shown in theaters throughout Japan. Special limited tickets to see the movie came with a thirteen-track live CD of songs from the depicted concert, which was recorded on September 8, 1996, at Chiba Marine Stadium.

In March 2013, Headwax Organization announced that Hide's grave site at Miura Reien was vandalized when unknown suspect(s) scratched the gravestone with a sharp object. They stated that if additional acts occur, the grave would be temporarily closed to the public. Hide "performed" with Super Band, a one-off band whose lineup altered per song, at Sodegaura Kaihin Koen on September 14, 2013, as part of Kishidan Banpaku 2013 hosted by Kishidan. Its members included J on bass, Hisashi Imai and Hisashi on guitar, Ken Morioka on keyboards, and Tetsu (D'erlanger) on drums. A previously unfinished song by Hide called "Co Gal" (子 ギャル, Ko Gyaru) has been completed by Yamaha and INA utilizing vocaloid technology to mimic the deceased musician's voice. The song was originally written and demoed for Ja, Zoo in 1998, took two years to finish and was included on an album by Universal Music released on December 10, 2014.

Junk Story, a theatrical documentary on Hide that includes interviews with friends, staff and fellow musicians who knew him, entered theaters across Japan on May 23, 2015. Hide with Spread Beaver performed on October 15, 2016, at Makuhari Messe alongside X Japan and Glay as part of the second day of the Visual Japan Summit. A special Hide 20th Memorial Super Live Spirits was held at Tokyo Otaiba Yagai Tokusetsu Stage J Chikuon on April 28 and 29, 2018. In addition to Hide with Spread Beaver on both nights, other acts that performed over the two days included Buck-Tick, Oblivion Dust, Mucc and Tomoyasu Hotei. A multimedia box set titled hide 1998 ~Last Words~ and containing five CDs, a DVD and two books was released on May 2. All conducted within the last few months of his life, the CDs contain radio interviews Hide gave on Nippon Broadcasting System and Bay FM 78, the DVD contains footage shot in Los Angeles while recording Ja, Zoo, and the books republish interviews he gave to magazines such as Rockin'On Japan and Fool's Mate. On May 26, a documentary film titled Hurry Go Round was released in theaters. Another tribute album titled Tribute Impulse was released on June 6, 2018, and features acts such as Dragon Ash, Takanori Nishikawa and Miyavi.

In October 2021, the exhibition "Psychovision Hide Museum Since 2000" opened in Ikebukuro, Tokyo. Divided into five zones, it displayed about 300 items, including memorabilia from Hide's childhood, his guitars, stage costumes, handwritten lyrics, gold and platinum records, and artwork that he drew himself. The exhibition moved each year, to Aichi, Osaka, and Fukuoka, before its final stop at the Sogo Museum of Art in Yokohama from March 19 to May 7, 2025.

Using the 2010 book by Hide's brother Hiroshi and I.N.A.'s 2018 book as sources, Renpei Tsukamoto wrote and directed the live-action film Tell Me: Hide to Mita Keshiki (TELL ME ～hideと見た景色～) about how Hiroshi and I.N.A. struggled to finish and release Hide's music after his death in 1998. Released on July 8, 2022, in addition to Tsubasa Imai as Hiroshi, actual musicians were cast for the roles of Hide and the members of Spread Beaver; Juon of the band Fuzzy Control as Hide, Takashi Tsukamoto as I.N.A., Naoki Kawano as Joe, Sex Machineguns bassist Shingo☆ as Chirolyn, Orito Kasahara as Kiyoshi, Yuuki Kubo as D.I.E., and Masato Kataoka as K.A.Z. I.N.A. mixed live recordings from the 1998 Tribal Ja, Zoo Tour for use in the film. Four of them were released digitally as hide with Spread Beaver Appear!! "1998 Tribal Ja,Zoo" (Live) 2022 Mix on July 6. In 2023, to commemorate the 30th anniversary of Hide's solo debut and the 25th anniversary of his death, Hide with Spread Beaver reunited for their first one-man lives in 21 years. They performed at Zepp Osaka Bayside on April 29, Kanagawa Kenmin Hall on May 2, and Toyosu Pit on July 27. They performed two one-man lives at the Tokyo Metropolitan Gymnasium on May 2 and 3, 2025, as part of celebrations to commemorate what would have been Hide's 60th birthday.

== Personal life ==
Hide's younger brother Hiroshi was his chauffeur and manager until his last days. Hiroshi has a son whom, during the Hide Our Psychommunity Tour, Hide would bring onstage and sing to. Hiroshi is the president of Hide's management company Headwax Organization, and also appears on Ja, Zoo reading an excerpt on "Pink Cloud Assembly".

During an interview for the television show Rocket Punch!, recorded on May 1, 1998, Hide said he had a girlfriend. The identity of this girlfriend was never confirmed, as Hide died the following day.

== Musicianship ==
=== Musical style ===
Hide was influenced by hard rock bands such as Iron Maiden, AC/DC and Bow Wow as well as punk rock acts such as The Clash and Sex Pistols. However, Kiss guitarist Ace Frehley was his idol and biggest influence. He preferred guitarists who make playing look "effortless" and who have "the skill, the looks and the attitude", naming Frehley, Jimmy Page and Joe Perry. He cited Bauhaus' guitarist Daniel Ash as an influence as well. Hide cited Iron Maiden's self-titled debut album for teaching him how to arrange twin guitar parts.

In X Japan, Hide is the second most credited songwriter to Yoshiki, and appears to have been the most experimental as well. The song "Xclamation" from 1989's Blue Blood, co-composed with Taiji, included traditional Indian percussion; "Scars", a single written by Hide from 1996's Dahlia, was a glimpse into his future experiments in industrial rock, according to Alexey Eremenko of AllMusic. The Japan Times's Philip Brasor commented that when Hide died, "Japanese metal lost its greatest practicing innovator."

At the outset of his solo career, Hide experimented with instrumentations very different from what he usually had access to in X Japan. The Hide Your Face opening track "Psychommunity", for example, has four guitar tracks and employs a full string section. As another example, "Blue Sky Complex" features guitars in drop C tuning, a trumpet section, and an organ. His solo music is also of genres uncharacteristic of X, with the bulk of his catalog being considered alternative rock. These works included influences ranging from pop rock to industrial rock.

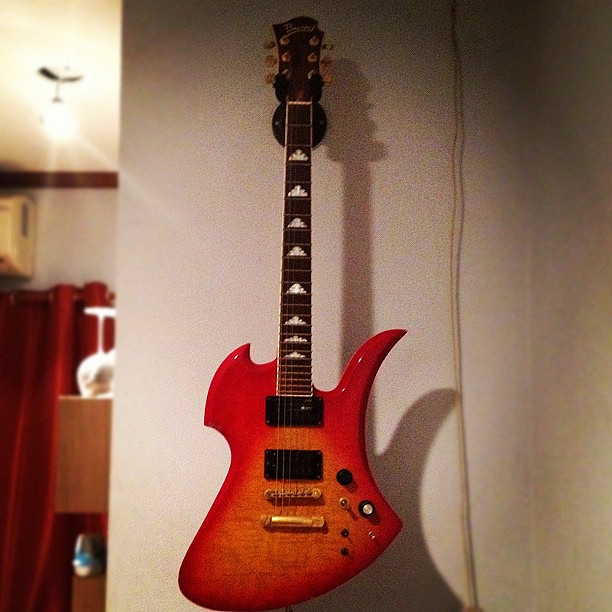
A Burny MG-130S, one of Hide's signature model guitars

His lyrics were often dark, with one TV host saying "A lot of what Hide did was grotesque. He's talked about suicide in his records for five years. But the fans who followed him always knew there was a Hide behind that who was a very solid character. He was very outspoken about freedom and doing what you want". His compositions "often set the tone of alienation and frustration for which X Japan was revered." Radio and TV host Bryan Burton-Lewis explained "In Japan, the image that we have of the X audience is rural kids going through a rebellion phase", "they all talk about how [hide] gave them something to live for." Japanese DJ Maki Yanai believes fans saw in him the rebel society would not allow them to be.

=== Equipment ===
Hide was a fan of Bow Wow guitarists Kyoji Yamamoto and Mitsuhiro Saito, and played Mockingbird-shaped guitars, which Saito used. Hide was rarely seen performing without a Fernandes guitar. He had many signature models with the company, some of which are still in production. In the early 1990s, he used one that became the basis for his MG-X Paint model, which features a psychedelic paint job modeled after the one Hide painted himself. From the mid-1990s, he began using the MG-X Cherry Sunburst, which combines then-modern electronics such as a Fernandes Sustainer, with a Sunburst aesthetic inspired by the Gibson Les Paul. His MG-X Yellow Heart model features a bright yellow paint job with red hearts, designed after a favorite T-shirt of his, in order to contrast with his heavy music. Hide also had a JG Custom, which mimics the shape of a Fender Jaguar and features embedded LEDs that light up in response to picking dynamics.

Hide also owned a large repertoire of guitars by other manufacturers. While in Los Angeles, he purchased a 1959 Gibson Les Paul Standard that was once owned by Mick Mars of Mötley Crüe for 20 million yen. As of 2025, that guitar was valued to be worth 100 million yen. The whereabouts of Hide's first electric guitar, a Gibson Les Paul Deluxe that his grandmother bought him through connections at the United States military base in Yokosuka, are unknown; Pata suggested that it was sold during X Japan's indie years when they were struggling financially.

== Legacy and influence ==
Hide is regarded as very influential to not only contemporary Japanese musicians, but also to his generation. X Japan is considered one of the founders of visual kei, a movement among Japanese musicians comparable to Western glam, and subsequently are influences to many newer bands. When they disbanded, Hide was the only member to carry on with the look and had the most successful solo career. As such, acts that cite him specifically as an influence include D'espairsRay, Mucc guitarist Miya and vocalist Tatsuro, Syu of Galneryus, Hizaki and Teru of Versailles, members from heidi., Naoto of Deathgaze, DuelJewel's Shun, Kouichi of Laputa, Jui from Vidoll, Reo of lynch., Dir En Grey vocalist Kyo and guitarist Kaoru, each member of Daizystripper, Kohshi from Flow, members of MarBell, Head Phones President frontwoman Anza, Aldious guitarist Toki, DJ Ozma, Ami Suzuki, Silver Ash leader Ling, Chiemi Ishimoto from Mass of the Fermenting Dregs, Marilyn Manson, Minami Momochi, Dezert drummer Sora, Haru of Xaa-Xaa, Xanvala vocalist Tatsumi, and Shokichi. Ryuichi stated that Hide was a big influence on Luna Sea. Siam Shade vocalist Hideki wrote the lyrics to his band's 1998 song "Grayish Wing" as a tribute to Hide. Nightmare's Hitsugi started playing guitar because of Hide, and derived the "Hi" part of his stage name from Hide's.

Hide has been compared to Kurt Cobain and Jimi Hendrix with regards to his impact on Japanese youth, having been "elevated to a 'guitar god' status." In 2018, readers and professional musicians voted Hide the second best guitarist in the history of hard rock and heavy metal in We Rock magazine's "Metal General Election". According to Josephine Yun, Hide's "stage persona was insolent, in your face, taunting and belligerent, and it thrilled Japanese youth while horrifying older generations. Many Japanese felt stifled by convention and identified with his naughty rebelliousness; he became a cult figure." Neil Strauss claims Hide "despised the music business and wanted to change it" and that he said he felt "trapped in the image of a pop star." According to Strauss, he "represented a generation of fans who felt alienated, and his death represented the end of a genre." Billboard's Steve McClure concurred; his "death means the end of an era", adding "X were the first generation of visual kei bands[...] For the next generation of bands, it's like: That's it. The torch has been passed to us."

== Spread Beaver ==
Hide's backing band for his solo career:

- Kazuhiko "I.N.A." Inada (稲田和彦) – percussion, programming, keyboards, keytar, backing vocals 1993–1998, 2008, 2016, 2018, 2023, 2025 (Zilch, Dope HEADz, Sonic Storage)
- Toshiya "Ran" Matsukawa (松川敏也) – guitar, backing vocals 1994–1996 (Blizard, X-Ray, Twinzer)
- Hiroshi "Chirolyn" Watanabe (渡邊紘士) – bass, acoustic guitar, backing and lead vocals 1994–1998, 2008, 2016, 2018, 2023, 2025 (Debonair, Madbeavers, Chirolyn & The Angels)
- Satoshi "Joe" Miyawaki (宮脇知史) – drums 1994–1998, 2008, 2016, 2018, 2023, 2025 (44Magnum, Ziggy, Madbeavers, Rider Chips)
- Daijiro "D.I.E." Nozawa (野澤大二郎) – keyboards, keytar, piano, guitar, backing and lead vocals 1994–1998, 2008, 2016, 2018, 2023, 2025 (Loopus, Ra:IN, Minimum Rockets)
- Kiyoshi Honma (本間清司) – guitar, backing vocals 1996–1998, 2008, 2016, 2018, 2023, 2025 (Jewel, Virus, Media Youth, R, machine, Madbeavers, Lucy)
- Kazuhito "K.A.Z" Iwaike (岩池一仁) – guitar, backing vocals 1998, 2008, 2016, 2018, 2023, 2025 (Oblivion Dust, Spin Aqua, Sonic Storage, Vamps)

X Japan guitarist Pata made numerous live appearances with the band and also appears on a couple studio recordings. Jennifer Finch and Demetra "Dee" Plakas, of American all-girl grunge band L7, supported Hide on a couple of TV performances in 1993 before Spread Beaver was formed, they also appear in the original promotional video for "Doubt".

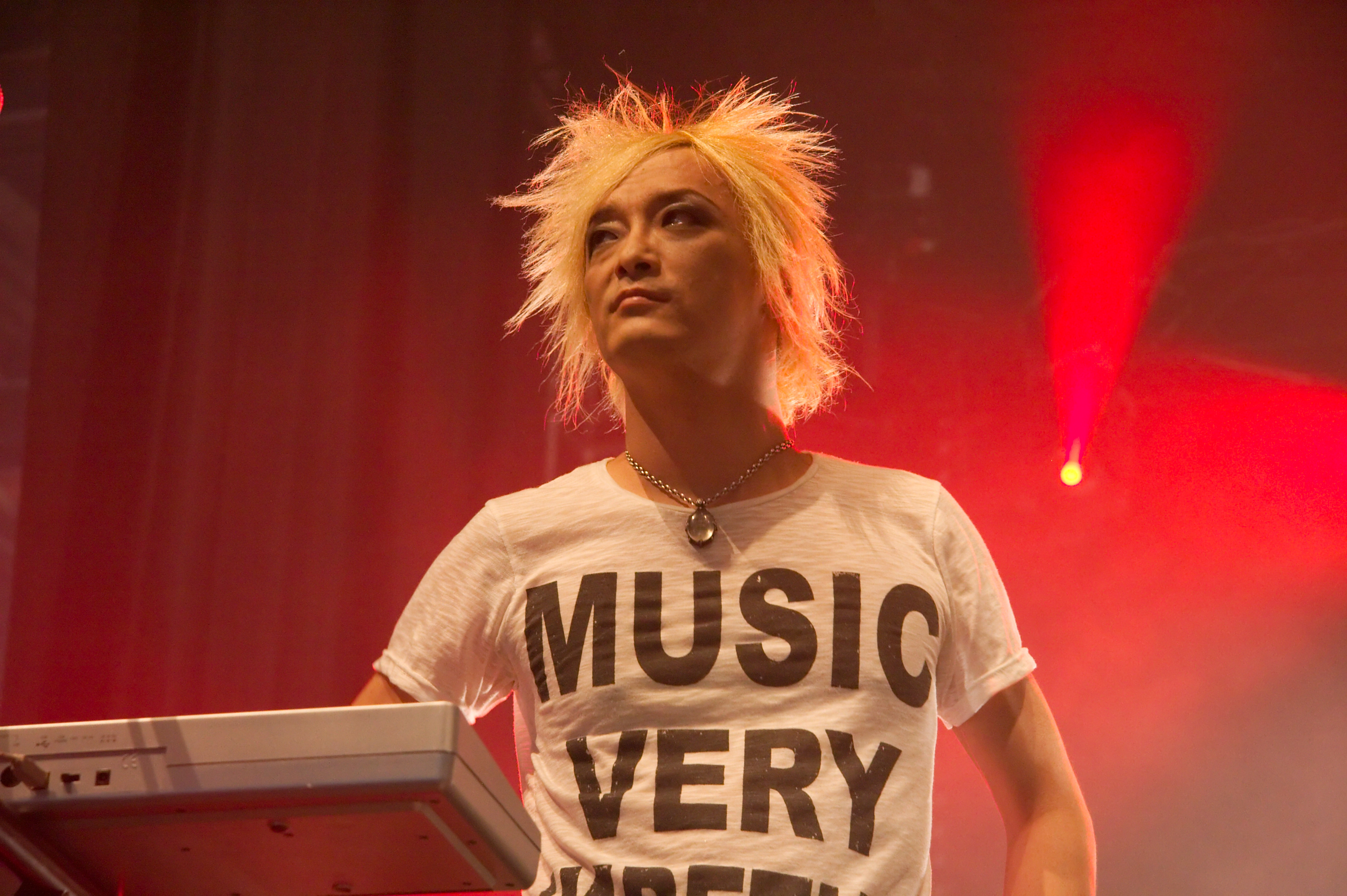
Spread Beaver keyboardist D.I.E. in 2009

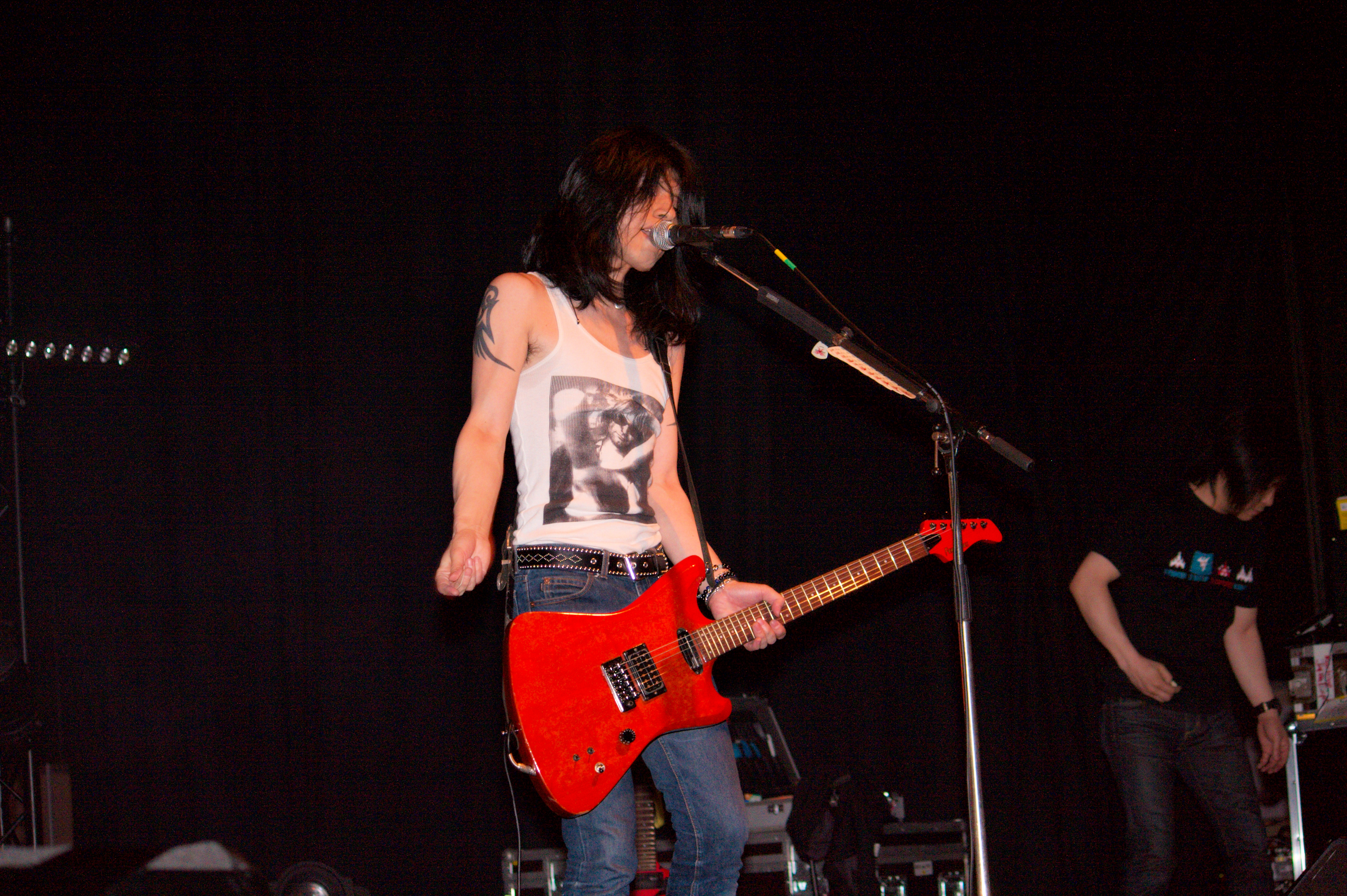
Spread Beaver guitarist Kiyoshi in 2008

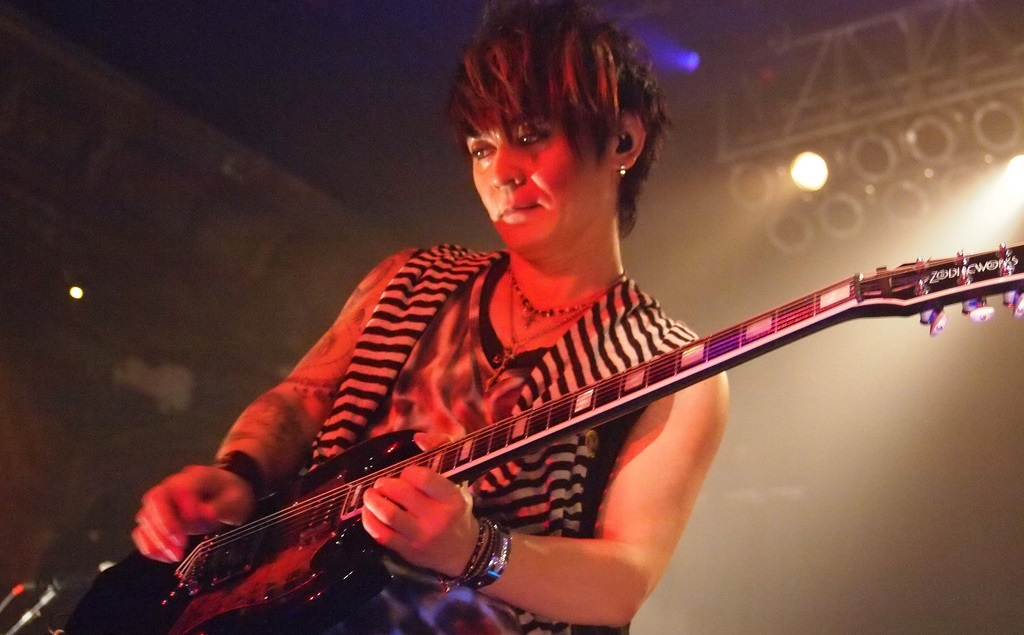
Spread Beaver guitarist K.A.Z in 2013

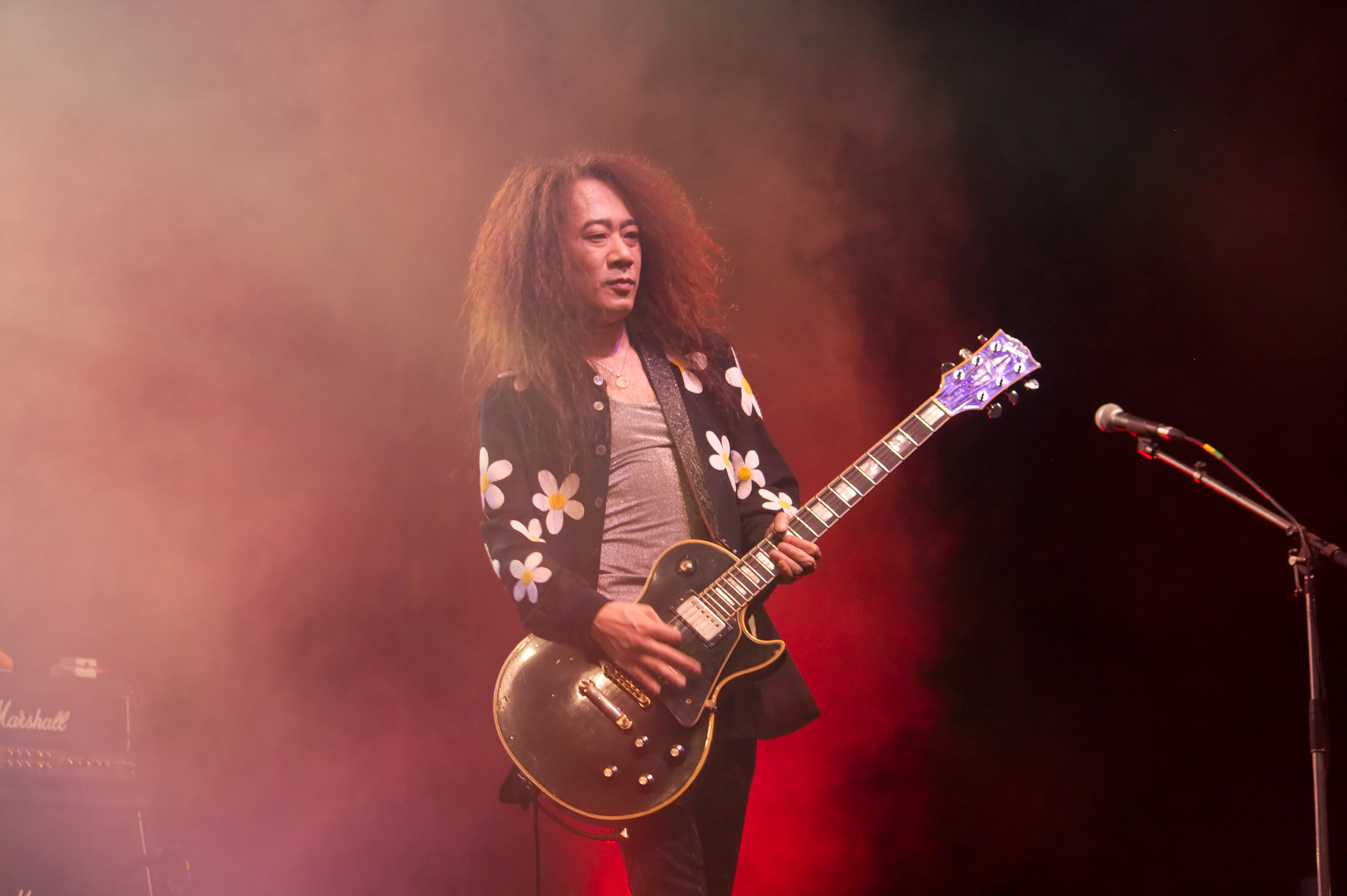
Occasional Spread Beaver guitarist Pata in 2008

== Discography ==
- Hide Your Face (1994)
- Psyence (1996)
- Ja, Zoo (1998)
