= Brat =

Brat, Brats, The Brat or similar may refer to:

== People and characters ==
=== Term for young people ===
- Military brat
  - Military brat (U.S. subculture)
- Trenchard Brat, a nickname for aircraft apprentices in the British Royal Air Force

=== Persons ===
- Da Brat (born 1974), rapper
- Roger Kitter (born 1950), recorded as The Brat for the song "Chalk Dust - the Umpire Strikes Back"

==== People with the name ====
- Daniel Brat, American neuropathologist
- Dave Brat (born 1964), American academic and politician

=== Fictional characters ===
- Brat, a character (a wild boar-dragon hybrid) on the 1985 children's series The Wuzzles
- Brat, the blond member of the Powerpunk Girls, a trio of the villains from the DC comics Powerpuff Girls

== Groups, organizations, companies ==
- The Brat (band), American punk rock band
- Brats (band), Japanese rock band
- Brat TV, a digital network featuring web series broadcast on YouTube
- Brat Pack, a term for a group of young actors

== Films ==
- The Brat (1919 film), an early silent film produced by and starring Alla Nazimova
- Brats (1930 film), a 1930 Laurel and Hardy film
- Brats (1991 film), a 1991 Hungarian film
- Brats (2024 film), a 2024 documentary on the Brat Pack
- The Brat, a 1931 film directed by John Ford
- Brother (1997 film) (Russian: Брат, translit. Brat), a Russian crime film
- Brother 2 (2000 film) (Russian: Брат 2, translit. Brat 2), a Russian crime film, sequel to Brother (1997)

== Music ==
- "Brat", a song by Green Day from Insomniac
- NME Brat Awards for popular music
- Brat (album), 2024 album by Charli XCX
- Brat (Nnamdï album), 2020 album by Nnamdï

== Food, cuisine, diet ==
- Bratwurst, a type of sausage
- BRAT diet, for patients with various forms of gastrointestinal distress
- B-ration (B-rat), U.S. Military Field Ration Type B

== Other uses ==
- Brat (novel), the debut novel of author Gabriel Smith
- Subaru BRAT, a pickup truck
- Bratz (dolls), a line of dolls
- Brat (social media), word for personality or lifestyle trait used on social media
- Brat Summer, a 2024 cultural phenomenon inspired by Charli XCX's album, Brat
- Brat (video game), a 1991 action puzzle video game
- Brat, name for fans of Hakos Baelz
- Brat language, a name sometimes found in the old literature for the Maybrat language of West Papua
- Brat., the abbreviation for the orchid nothogenus × Bratonia
- Brat, a term used in BDSM
- Bradley Reactive Armor Tile (BRAT), as found on the M-2 Bradley tracked armored fighting vehicle

== See also ==
- Brat Pack (disambiguation)
- Bratt (disambiguation)
- Bratty (disambiguation)
- Vrata (disambiguation)
