= Bratt =

Bratt may refer to the following:

== Given name ==
- Bratt Sinclaire (born 1967), Italian music producer

== Surname ==
- Benjamin Bratt (born 1963), American actor
- Bill Bratt (born 1945), English football official
- Carolyn Bratt (born 1943), American lawyer and activist
- Edith Bratt (1889–1971), birth name of Edith Tolkien, English wife of J. R. R. Tolkien
- Eyvind Bratt (1907–1987), Swedish diplomat
- Harold Bratt (1939–2018), English footballer
- James Bratt (born 1949), American scholar
- Jesper Bratt (born 1998), Swedish ice hockey player
- Lisen Bratt (born 1976), Swedish Olympic equestrian
- Peter Bratt (born 1944), Swedish journalist
- Ruth Bratt, English actress and comedian
- Steve Bratt (born 1957), American internet entrepreneur
- Torbjørn Bratt (c. 1502 – 1548), Norwegian clergyman
- Will Bratt (born 1988), British racing driver

== Fictional ==
- Balthazar Bratt from Despicable Me 3

== Places ==
- Bratt-Smiley House, a historic house in Arkansas, U.S.

== Other ==
- Bratt pan, a large cooking pan
- Bratt system, Swedish system to control alcohol consumption

== See also ==
- Brat (disambiguation)
- Bratt System
