= Brat (novel) =

2024 novel

- Author: Gabriel Smith
- Published: 2024
- Publisher: Scribner (UK), Penguin Press (US)

Brat is the debut novel of Gabriel Smith (born c.1995), a British author living in London. The novel was published in 2024 by Scribner in the U.K. and by Penguin Press in the U.S. The book, which has been described as a "haunted house benzo novel", follows a series of strange events that befall the narrator as he prepares to sell his parents' home.

Coverage of the book increased after a joke tweet by the author went viral in which he shared an alleged email from British pop star Charli XCX asking him for permission to use the title of his book as the title for her new album. Brat has been described by reviewers as "autofiction", a term which the author resists, claiming that the novel is written in the mode of gothic horror and that autofiction, by contrast, is "a symptom of a couple of generations being told they could not imagine alternatives to the present".

Reviews for Brat were mixed but largely positive, with many commentators praising the novel's humor and wit. Anthony Cummins, writing for The Guardian, praised Smith for crafting "a moving coming-of-age family story", noting that while the novel "sometimes feels like it's been put into the world before quite being ready," he was nonetheless eager to read more of the author's writing, as "Smith definitely has something". Kazuo Robinson wrote a highly laudatory view in the Chicago Review of Books, writing, "This novel is funny. Not witty or zany, but funny, actually funny. This is a wonderful thing." Kirkus Reviews agreed that the book was "morbidly funny", noting that "[w]hile his prose can be unadorned to a fault at times, his dialogue shines, and there’s an undercurrent of humor throughout that leavens the book’s darkness". Jay McInerney, writing for Air Mail, praised the author's humor and noted the influence of DiTrapano but ultimately claimed he was "not sure that DiTrapano would have approved". Leah Abrams, writing for the Cleveland Review of Books, gave the book high points for style and humor but made several criticisms as well, writing that Smith "eschews arc and plot altogether", "neglects the few characters beyond his eponymous protagonist", and "tends to the novel's central epiphany only implicitly, without much interest or investment in the outcome". In his write-up for the New York Times, Matt Bell expressed confusion over the significance of some events in the novel but acknowledged that ambiguity and mystery are key elements of the narrative style of the book.

== Bibliography ==
Scribner acquired the rights to Smith's next novel as part of the same two-book deal in which they acquired the UK and Commonwealth rights to Brat. That book, The Complete, is to be based on Smith's short story of the same name, for which he earned a PEN/O. Henry Award in 2023.

Novels

- Brat (2024). The two subtitles under which the work appeared were added by the publishers.
  - Brat: A Ghost Story, first U.K. edition. ISBN 978-1-39-852531-3.
  - Brat: A Novel, first U.S. edition. ISBN 978-0-59-365687-7.
- The Complete (2026).

=== Other writing by Gabriel Smith ===
- "Brat", Granta, 14 May 2024. An extract from the novel.
- "The Stare", in The Drift, Issue 7, 14 June 2022.
- "The Complete", The Drift, Issue 6, 24 January 2022.
- "About Fucking", Hobart, 1 September 2021.
- "Fight Report", Hobart, 12 June 2020.
- "Year of the Pig", The Moth. Winner of the Second Prize in the Moth Short Story Prize 2020
- "Extract from 'Dead Parents'", Hobart, 26 November 2019. Later incorporated into Brat; Dead Parents was a working title.
- "Zuckerberg", Hobart, 1 March 2019.
- "Transubstantiation", Barely South Review.
