= Brats (band) =

Japanese band

- Origin: Tokyo, Japan
- Genres: Rock, punk rock, alternative rock
- Years active: 2011–2024
- Members: Rei Kuromiya; Aya Kuromiya
- Past members: Maria; Seira Goto; Hinako
- Website: brats-official.com

Brats (stylized as BRATS) is a Japanese all-female rock band formed in 2011 by sisters Rei and Aya Kuromiya. In 2015, guitarist Hinako became an official member of the group. The band released their first full-length album BRATS in 2018, which contained theme songs from the anime series To Be Hero and the Japanese film Slavemen. In 2024, the band announced they were suspending activities indefinitely.

== History ==
Brats was formed in Tokyo in August 2011 by sisters Rei Kuromiya and Aya Kuromiya, when they were 10- and 12-years-old, respectively. The band name was chosen by Rei because of her "brat"-like personality. On August 15, 2012, Brats released their first demo CD "Gangan Do it!" on the same day as their first performance at Shibuya Club Quattro. On August 25, they received a special award in the 634 Band Contest at Azumabashi Fest. On May 3, 2013, Brats performed at Imax Live 2013 held at Ikebukuro's RUIDO K3, and held their first solo live show on August 11, 2013, at the same venue. On April 10, 2015, they released their independently produced first single, "Misery".

On November 21, 2015, Brats released the music video "14-sai-byou" ("14-year-old disease"). The song, produced by Urbangarde's Temma Matsunaga, featured the band performing in techno-rock style connected to religious, lolita, and horror imagery, but Rei later stated that she felt the song and its video weren't true to her vision of the band: "It's what Temma-san felt Brats was, and we jumped into the world of Urbangarde." The band paused activities in March 2015, and Rei Kuromiya temporarily joined the group Ladybaby, continuing through November 2017. On December 24, 2016, Brats posted a teaser image on their website with the date "12.27.16", and 3 days later, on December 27, Brats revealed their new hard rock style in the music video "Ainikoiyo", the opening theme from the Japanese anime To Be Hero. Rei explained the decision to move in a hard rock direction was rooted in the band members coming of age: "Now, the three of us are a bit older and we can express more of our own opinions, like 'We want to rock more!' We feel confident about our direction, so we have no doubt about our future."

On March 29, 2017, Brats returned to live performances with the free solo concert, "Reborn", at Ikebukuro's Live Inn Rosa, their first live performance in over 2 years. At the show, they announced the upcoming release of a double-A-side single, which would include bonus live content in special Japanese and international editions. On March 3, 2017, Brats released the music video for the song "Nounai Shoukyo Game", which served as the theme song for the Japanese film Slavemen, directed by Noboru Iguchi. On June 21, 2017, Brats released the double-A-side single "Ainikoiyo"/"Nounai Shoukyo Game", with additional live tracks available in the Japanese limited-edition CD and international digital release, breaking into the Oricon Top 100 at number 92 and reaching number 8 on the Oricon Indies chart.

On July 25, 2018, the band released their first full-length album, self-titled BRATS, which included "Ainikoiyo" and "Nounai Shoukyo Game" along with new songs and fully mastered versions of the previously released live tracks. The album reached number 111 on the Oricon chart, and featured lead singer Rei's first attempt at writing lyrics, credited as co-writer of the songs "Pain" and "Lost Place". Brats made their first live concert appearance outside of Japan at "Ambitious Girls Series 1" at West Bridge Hall in Seoul, South Korea, alongside idol-metal group Broken by the Scream on January 20, 2019. The band used concert footage from the event in their music video for "Unfair".

On January 10, 2020, Brats performed in the United States at Anime Los Angeles in Ontario, California, and released the digital single "Excuser". On February 14, the band released the digital single "No more No more" with the cover image shot in Hollywood, California. On July 24, 2020, the band announced release of their second studio album, titled Karma, set to be released on September 30. On July 27, guitarist Hinako announced her departure, citing creative differences. On March 31, 2024, the band announced they were suspending activities indefinitely.

== Music and influences ==
Brats members have cited various rock and punk influences as their inspirations. Rei's interest in performing music began when she saw a SCANDAL concert at the age of 10, and Hinako started a band when she was 15 years old covering Japanese bands such as ELLEGARDEN. Aya lists singer Mio Yamazaki as a model female musician.

== Band members ==
Current members

- Rei Kuromiya (黒宮れい) (b: 11/29/2000) - vocals, guitar (2011–present)
- Aya Kuromiya (黒宮あや) (b: 11/28/1998) - bass, backing vocals (2011–present)

Former members

- Maria (まりあ) (b: 6/3/2000) - drums (2011–2013)
- Seira Goto (後藤聖良) (b: 6/8/1998) - guitar (2011–2014)
- Hinako (ひなこ) (b: 9/5/1996) - guitar (2015–2020)

== Discography ==
=== Studio albums ===
Year	Album details	Oricon
2018	Brats: Released: July 25, 2018; Label: Fabtone; Formats: CD, CD/DVD, digital download; Track listing: 1. Pain; 2. Kaihou Seyo (解放セヨ); 3. Doudatte Yokatta (どうだってよかった); 4. Unfair (アンフェア); 5. Lost Place; 6. Kimarigoto (決まりごと); 7. Big Bad World; 8. Seitō-ka Pride Monster (正当化プライドモンスター); 9. Nounai Shoukyo Game (脳内消去ゲーム); 10. Ainikoiyo (アイニコイヨ); DVD: 1. "Ainikoiyo" Music Video (アイニコイヨ Music Video); 2. "Nounai Shoukyo Game" Music Video (脳内消去ゲーム Music Video); 3. "Kimarigoto" Music Video (決まりごと Music Video); 4. "Doudatte Yokatta" Music Video (どうだってよかった Music Video); 5. "Kaihou Seyo" Music Video (解放セヨ Music Video)	111
2020	Karma: Released: September 30, 2020; Label: Far East Monster Records, Avex; Formats: CD, CD/DVD, CD/Music sheet, digital download; Track listing: 1. Excuser (エクスキューザー); 2. No more No more 3. Ms. Downer; 4. Fate; 5. Jigyakusei Loop (自虐性Loop); 6. Kimarigoto -Version 2020- (決まりごと-Version 2020-); 7. Toge (棘); 8. Forget me not; CD Type A Bonus Tracks: 1. Lost Place -Version 2020- (1st AL track Re-Mix) (Lost Place -Version 2020-(1stAL収録曲Re-Mix)); 2. Doudatte Yokatta -Live Version 2020- (1st AL included song LIVE) (どうだってよかった -Live Version 2020-(1stAL収録曲LIVE)); 3. Kimarigoto -Live Version 2020- (1st AL recorded song LIVE) (決まりごと -Live Version 2020-(1stAL収録曲LIVE)); CD Type B Bonus Tracks: 1. No more No more (Live); 2. Ms Downer (Live); 3. Excuser (Live) (エクスキューザー (Live)); DVD Type A: 1. Excuser (Live/2020) (エクスキューザー (LIVE/2020)); 2. No more No more (Live/2020); 3. Ms. Downer (Live/2020); 4. Forget me not (MV); DVD Type B: 1. No more No more (MV); 2. Ms.Downer (with FUN MV); 3. Jigyakusei Loop (MV) (自虐性Loop (MV)); 4. Toge (MV) (棘 (MV))	152

=== Live albums ===
Year	Album details	Oricon
2020	Karma The Live (Live at TSUTAYA O-EAST 2020.09.13): Released: December 11, 2020; Label: Far East Monster Records, Avex; Formats: digital download; Track listing: 1. Forget me not 2. Toge (棘); 3. No more No more 4. Excuser (エクスキューザー); 5. Fate; 6. Ms. Downer; 7. Jigyakusei Loop (自虐性Loop); 8. Kimarigoto -Version 2020- (決まりごと-Version 2020-)	—
2021	Ambitious Girls (Live at Chord 2020.11.08): Released: January 1, 2021; Label: Far East Monster Records, Avex; Formats: digital download	—
2021	Young Bloods (Live at Yokohama Bay Hall 2020.12.13): Released: February 5, 2021; Label: Far East Monster Records, Avex; Formats: digital download	—
2021	Ambitious Girls Rock 1 (Live at Tsutaya O-Crest 2021.01.10): Released: March 5, 2021; Label: Far East Monster Records, Avex; Formats: digital download	—
2021	Ambitious Girls Rock 2 (Live at Live House Fever 2021.03.20): Released: June 4, 2021; Label: Far East Monster Records, Avex; Formats: digital download	—
2021	Reload "Type A" - Ambitious Girls Rock 3 - (Live at Flowers Loft 2021.07.22-Noon): Released: November 26, 2021; Label: Far East Monster Records, Avex; Formats: digital download	—
2021	Reload "Type B" - Ambitious Girls Rock 4 - (Live at Flowers Loft 2021.07.22-Night): Released: December 24, 2021; Label: Far East Monster Records, Avex; Formats: digital download	—

=== Singles and EPs ===
Year	Single and EP details	Oricon
2015	"Misery": Released: April 10, 2015; Independent release	—
2015	"Juuyon Sai Byou" (十四歳病): Released: November 21, 2015; Independent release	—
2017	"Ainikoiyo"/"Nounai Shoukyo Game" (アイニコイヨ / 脳内消去ゲーム): Released: June 21, 2017; Label: TK Bros	92
2020	"Excuser" (エクスキューザー): Released: January 10, 2020; Label: Far East Monster Records, Avex	—
2020	"No more No more": Released: February 14, 2020; Label: Far East Monster Records, Avex	—
2020	"Ms.Downer": Released: March 20, 2020; Label: Far East Monster Records, Avex	—
2020	"Fate": Released: April 24, 2020; Label: Far East Monster Records, Avex	—
2020	"Jigyakusei Loop" (自虐性Loop): Released: May 29, 2020; Label: Far East Monster Records, Avex	—
2020	"Kimarigoto (Version 2020)" (決まりごと (Version 2020)): Released: June 26, 2020; Label: Far East Monster Records, Avex	—
2020	"Toge" (棘): Released: July 31, 2020; Label: Far East Monster Records, Avex	—
2020	"Forget me not": Released: August 28, 2020; Label: Far East Monster Records, Avex	—
2022	"Spiderweb": Released: September 16, 2022; Label: Far East Monster Records, Avex	—

== Videography ==
=== Music videos ===
- 2015: "Juuyon Sai Byou" (十四歳病)
- 2016: "Ainikoiyo" (アイニコイヨ)
- 2017: "Nounai Shoukyo Game" (脳内消去ゲーム)
- 2017: "Pain (LIVE)"
- 2018: "Kimarigoto" (決まりごと)
- 2018: "Doudatte yokatta" (どうだってよかった)
- 2018: "(Kimarigoto) Live Ver."
- 2019: "Unfair"
- 2020: "Kaihou seyo" (解放セヨ)
- 2020: "No more No more"
- 2020: "Jigyakusei Loop" (自虐性Loop)
- 2020: "Ms. Downer (Fan Version)"
- 2020: "Toge" (棘)
- 2020: "Forget me not"
- 2021: "BRATS × Elena Egorova (LENALYOLIK) - 棘 (Toge)"
- 2021: "BRATS × Mao Nakada - どうだってよかった (Doudatte yokatta) - Anime ver."
- 2022: "Spiderweb"

=== Video albums ===
- 2012: 2012.7.28 Shibuya TAKE OFF7『FIRST LIVE』BRATS

== Bibliography ==
- 2018: "BRATS Artist Book『10:7』"
- 2019: "BRATS PHOTO BOOK"

== Solo Concerts and festivals ==
=== Japan ===
- BRATS "Reborn" (free solo concert) (2017)
- HUG Rock Festival 2017 (4/29/2017)
- JAM Fes 2017 (5/5/2017)
- BRATS "WILL" (free solo concert) (7/20/2017)
- Urbangarde presents Utsu Fes 2017 (9/10/2017)
- BRATS "WILL 2" (free solo concert) (3/26/2018)
- BRATS Organized Event "Versus" (4/7/2018)
- HUG Rock Festival 2018 GW (05/03/2018)
- BRATS Event "Versus 2" (6/10/2018)
- BRATS "WILL 3" (free solo concert) (1/8/2018)
- BRATS "WILL 4" (free solo concert) (3/8/2018)
- BRATS Organized Event "Versus Special" (7/18/2018)
- BRATS Solo Concert "1st Round" (2/16/2019)
- BRATS Solo Concert "2nd Round" (3/17/2019)
- BRATS Solo Concert "3rd Round" (4/20/2019)
- GOLD RUSH 2019 Osaka (5/3/2019)
- GOLD RUSH 2019 Nagoya (5/4/2019)
- LIVEHOLIC 4th Anniversary series vol.7 (6/15/2019)
- FluoLightArch 12th Anniversary (7/21/2019)
- BRATS MIDSUMMER VERSUS @ 4 CAPITALS Tokyo (8/7/2019)
- BRATS MIDSUMMER VERSUS @ 4 CAPITALS Osaka (8/17/2019)
- BRATS MIDSUMMER VERSUS @ 4 CAPITALS Nagoya (8/18/2019)
- BRATS 1st. Tour Beginning Ebisu (10/5/2019)
- BRATS 1st. Tour Beginning Nagoya (10/14/2019)
- BRATS 1st. Tour Beginning Osaka (10/20/2019)
- BRATS 1st. Tour Beginning Tokyo (10/27/2019)
- UxDxGxW EXPEDITION 2019 Tokyo (11/4/2019)
- BRATS Organized Event "Versus – triple" (12/7/2019)
- Shooting BRATS CLUB CRAWL in Shibuya (2/11/2020)
- FAR EAST MONSTER RECORDS presents『Monster's Nest Vol.1』Shimokitazawa Flowers Loft (3/22/2020)
- HOME FES Higashi-Osaka Cultural Creation Center (8/2/2020)
- Ambitious Girls Rock 1@ TSUTAYA O-Crest (12/5/2020)
- YOUNG BLOODS @YOKOHAMA Bay Hall (12/13/2020)
- GOLD RUSH Osaka (5/4/2020 postponed due to coronavirus outbrake) (12/27/2020)
- GOLD RUSH Nagoya (5/3/2020 postponed due to coronavirus outbrake) (1/9/2021)
- BRATS – Spiderweb (10/8/2022)
- BRATS – DECISION (4/30/2023)

=== International ===
- BRATS Solo Concert in Korea - The Convent Club, Seoul, South Korea (1/19/2019)
- Ambitious Girls Series 1 - West Bridge Live Hall, Seoul, South Korea (1/20/2019)
- Wake Up Festival Taiwan 2019 - Chiayi, Taiwan (7/6/2019)
- BRATS & Broken by the Scream Live in Seoul /BRATS MIDSUMMER VERSUS @ 4 CAPITALS - West Bridge Live Hall, Seoul, South Korea (8/2/2019)
- Jeonju Ultimate Music Festival - Jeonju, South Korea (8/4/2019)
- Animé Los Angeles - Los Angeles, United States (1/10/2020)
- BRATS Continue-1 Shibuya Star Lounge (online with subtitles) (8/1/2020)
- BRATS Continue-2 Shibuya Chelsea Hotel (online with subtitles) (8/29/2020)
- Ambitious Girls Live (11/8/2020) (online)
- Ambitious Girls Rock 1 (Korea-Japan ONLINE) (online) (1/10/2021)
- Ambitious Girls Rock 2 (Korea-Japan-Thailand ONLINE) (online) (3/20/2021)
