= Rolling Quartz =

South Korean rock group

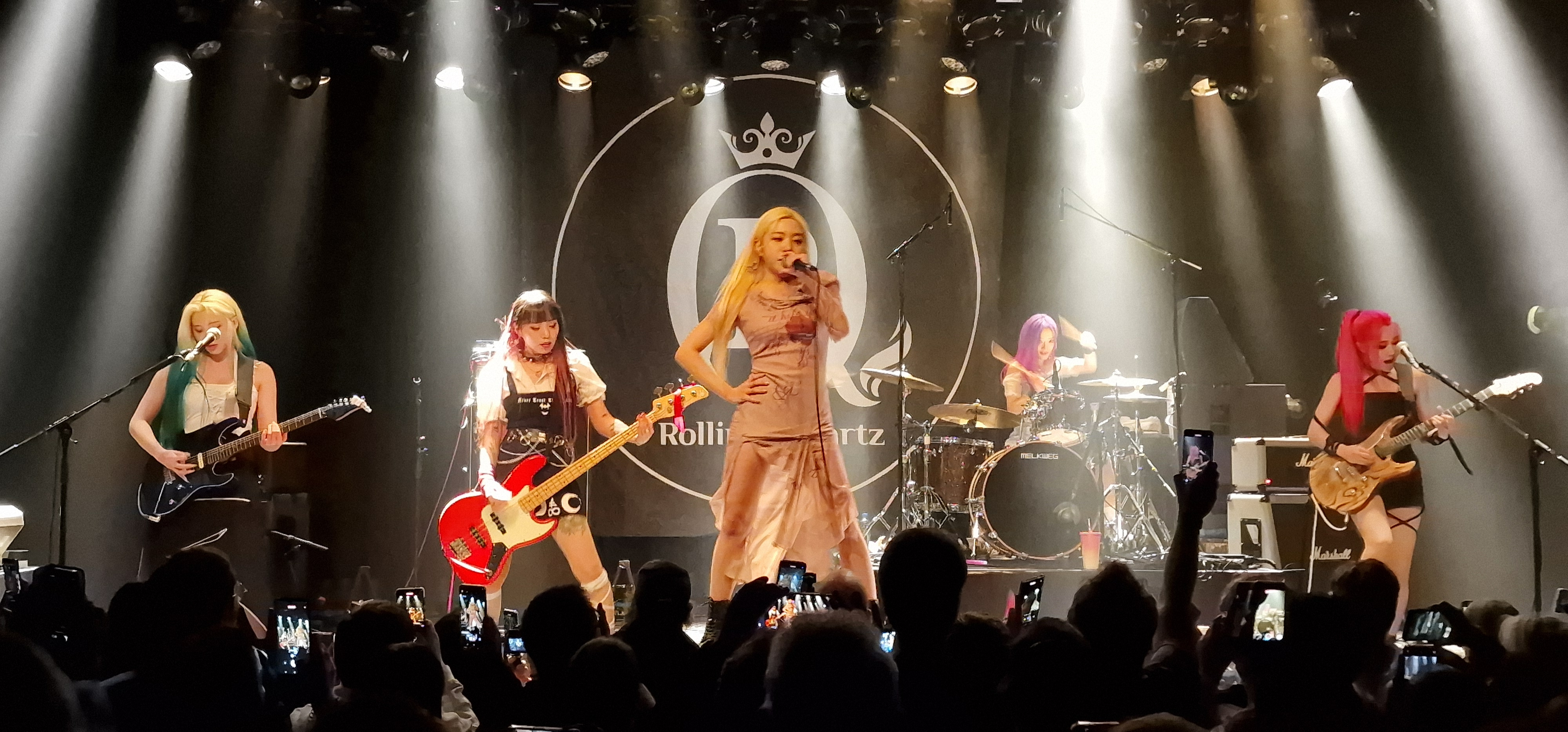
- Rolling Quartz performing in January 2024; L–R: Hyunjung, Arem, Jayoung, Yeongeun, and Iree

Background information
- Origin: Seoul, South Korea
- Genres: Rock; grunge
- Years active: 2019–present
- Label: Rolling Star Entertainment
- Members: Iree; Arem; Jayoung; Yeongeun; Hyunjung
- Website: rollingstarent.com

Rolling Quartz (Korean: 롤링쿼츠) is a South Korean rock band that debuted in December 2020 under Rolling Star Entertainment.

== History ==
=== 2019–present: Formation and debut ===
Rolling Quartz formed as a five member rock group in August 2019. They were originally two separate bands, under the names "Rolling Girlz" and "Rose Quartz", but they merged into a single group, merging their names to be "Rolling Quartz". For the first year of their career, Rolling Quartz performed primarily in clubs, especially in the Hongdae region of Seoul. However, they started relying more heavily on their social media presence in 2020 because of the COVID-19 pandemic.

In June 2020, they featured on the single "Random" by the producing duo 015B.

Rolling Quartz officially debuted on December 30, 2020 with the single "Blaze", which was accompanied by the release of a music video. The music video was directed and produced by Zanybros. All of the members participated in the production of the song, including lyrics, composition, and arrangement.

On January 10, 2021, the band was part of a livestream event Ambitious Girls Rock 1 alongside other female Korean and Japanese rock bands, including Vincit, Velvet Sighs, and Brats. In January, Rolling Quartz released their single "Blaze" as a single album, which included the instrumental version of the track. In February, the band made their first music show appearance, making their debut on M Countdown.

In August, the band collaborated with AleXa, arranging a rock version of her single "Xtra", which the band performed with AleXa on MTV Asia.

In February 2022, the band released their first EP Fighting, which made it into the top 5 US rock albums chart on iTunes, the first Korean indie band to do so.

== Members ==
- Arem (아름) – bass (2019–present)
- Hyunjung (현정) – guitar (2019–present)
- Iree (아이리) – guitar (2019–present)
- Jayoung (자영) – vocals (2019–present)
- Yeongeun (영은) – drums (2019–present)

== Discography ==
=== Extended plays ===
Title	Details	Peak chart positions	Sales
Title	Details	KOR	Sales
Fighting (화이팅)	Released: February 8, 2022; Label: Rolling Star Entertainment; Formats: CD, digital download, streaming audio; Track listing: 1. Delight; 2. Holler; 3. Rock'n'roll Paradise; 4. Good Night (Dreamcatcher cover); 5. Azalea (Maya cover) (진달래꽃); 6. Higher	38	Undisclosed
Victory	Released: June 19, 2024; Label: Rolling Star Entertainment; Formats: CD, digital download, streaming audio; Track listing: 1. Victory; 2. ONE; 3. Stand Up; 4. Red Wine; 5. Victory (inst.); 6. ONE (inst.); 7. Stand Up (inst.); 8. Red Wine (inst.)	85	KOR: 1,745
Roll the dice	Released: May 26, 2026; Label: Rolling Star Entertainment; Formats: CD, digital download, streaming audio; Track listing: 1. RE.BOLD 3:10; 2. My Turn 2:56; 3. Masquerade 2:54; 4. Romantist 5:31; 5. Red Hot 3:47; 6. Roll the dice (Feat. Lee Siyeon) 3:11; 7. Roll the dice (Ja Young Vox Ver.) 3:11	91	

=== Single albums ===
Title	Details	Peak chart positions	Sales
Title	Details	KOR	Sales
Blaze (블레이즈)	Released: January 21, 2021; Label: Rolling Star Entertainment; Formats: CD, digital download, streaming audio; Track listing: 1. Blaze (블레이즈); 2. Blaze (inst.) (블레이즈)	67	Undisclosed
Hybrid (하이브리드)	Released: October 26, 2022; Label: Rolling Star Entertainment; Formats: CD, digital download, streaming audio; Track listing: 1. NAZABABARA; 2. Sing Your Heart Out (심장의 노래); 3. NAZABABARA (inst.); 4. Sing Your Heart Out (inst.) (심장의 노래); 5. Sing Your Heart Out (Radio Edit.) (심장의 노래)	—	Undisclosed
Fearless	Released: September 20, 2023; Label: Rolling Star Entertainment; Formats: CD, digital download, streaming audio; Track listing: 1. Fearless; 2. Fearless (inst.)	67	KOR: 1,429

=== Singles ===
Title	Year	Peak chart position	Sales	Album
Title	Year	KOR	Sales	Album
As lead artist
"Blaze" (블레이즈)	2020	—	Undisclosed	Blaze
"Delight"	2022	—	Undisclosed	Fighting
"Good Night"	2022	—	Undisclosed	Fighting
"NAZABABARA"	2022	—	Undisclosed	Hybrid
"Fearless"	2023	—	Undisclosed	Fearless
"Reminiscence" (회상)	2023	—	Undisclosed	Sanulrim 50th Anniversary Project
"Stand Up"	2024	—	Undisclosed	Victory
"Victory"	2024	—	Undisclosed	Victory
"Re.Bold"	2024	—	Undisclosed	Non-album singles
"Masquerade"	2025	—	Undisclosed	Non-album singles
"Romantist"	2026	—	Undisclosed	Non-album singles
As featured artist
"Random" Prod. by 015B	2020	—	Undisclosed	New Edition 21

=== OSTs ===
Title	Year	Peak chart position	Sales	Album
Title	Year	KOR	Sales	Album
"ONE" ((BJ멸망전 공식 주제가))	2022	—	Undisclosed	ONE (BJ Battle of Destruction Official Theme Song)
"I'm a Loner" (Feat. Nam Do-hyon) (외톨이야)	2022	—	Undisclosed	Decibel OST

=== Videography ===
==== Music videos ====
Title	Year	Director
"Random"	2020	한승오
"Blaze"	2020	Zanybros
"Good Night"	2022	Simon
"Delight"	2022	Unknown
"Azalea"	2022	Simon
"Holler"	2022	Simon
"Nazababara"	2022	Zanybros
"Sing Your Heart Out"	2022	한승오, Floppy & Simon
"Fearless"	2023	Simon
"Reminiscence"	2023	Hans Brothers
"Stand Up"	2024	Simon
"Victory"	2024	Simon
"One"	2024	한승오 (Han Seungoh)
"Red Wine"	2024	한승오 (Han Seungoh)
"Re.Bold"	2024	Simon
"Masquerade"	2025	Simon
"Romantist"	2026	한승오 (Han Seungoh)
