= Vrata (disambiguation) =

Vrata is a religious practice in Hinduism.

Vrata may also refer to:

- Vrata, Dravograd, a settlement in Slovenia
- Vrata, Mehedinți, a commune in Romania
- Vrata, Primorje-Gorski Kotar County, a village in Croatia
- Vrata, Šmartno pri Litiji, a settlement in Slovenia
- Vrata Tunnel, a tunnel in Croatia

== See also ==
- Brat (disambiguation)
