= Japan Expo =

Japanese pop-culture convention in Paris

Coordinates: 48°58′20″N 2°30′59″E

- Status: Active
- Genre: Japanese culture Interactive entertainment
- Venue: Paris-Nord Villepinte Exhibition Centre
- Locations: Villepinte, Paris
- Country: France
- Inaugurated: 1999
- Most recent: July 3, 2025; 16 months ago
- Attendance: ▲252,510 (2019)
- Organizer: SEFA EVENT; JTS Group
- Website: www.japan-expo-paris.com/en/

Japan Expo is a convention on Japanese popular culture – the largest of its kind outside Japan – taking place in Paris, France, although it has branched out into a partnership festival – Kultima – and expanded to include some European and US pop culture as well. It is held yearly at the beginning of July for four days (usually from Thursday to Sunday) in the Paris-Nord Villepinte Exhibition Centre (the second-largest convention centre in France). The attendance has increased steadily over the years, with 2,400 visitors welcomed in the first edition in 1999 and more than 252,510 for the 2019 edition.

As with the Olympic Games and many other mass gatherings, the 2020 and 2021 editions were cancelled because of the global COVID-19 pandemic.

== History ==
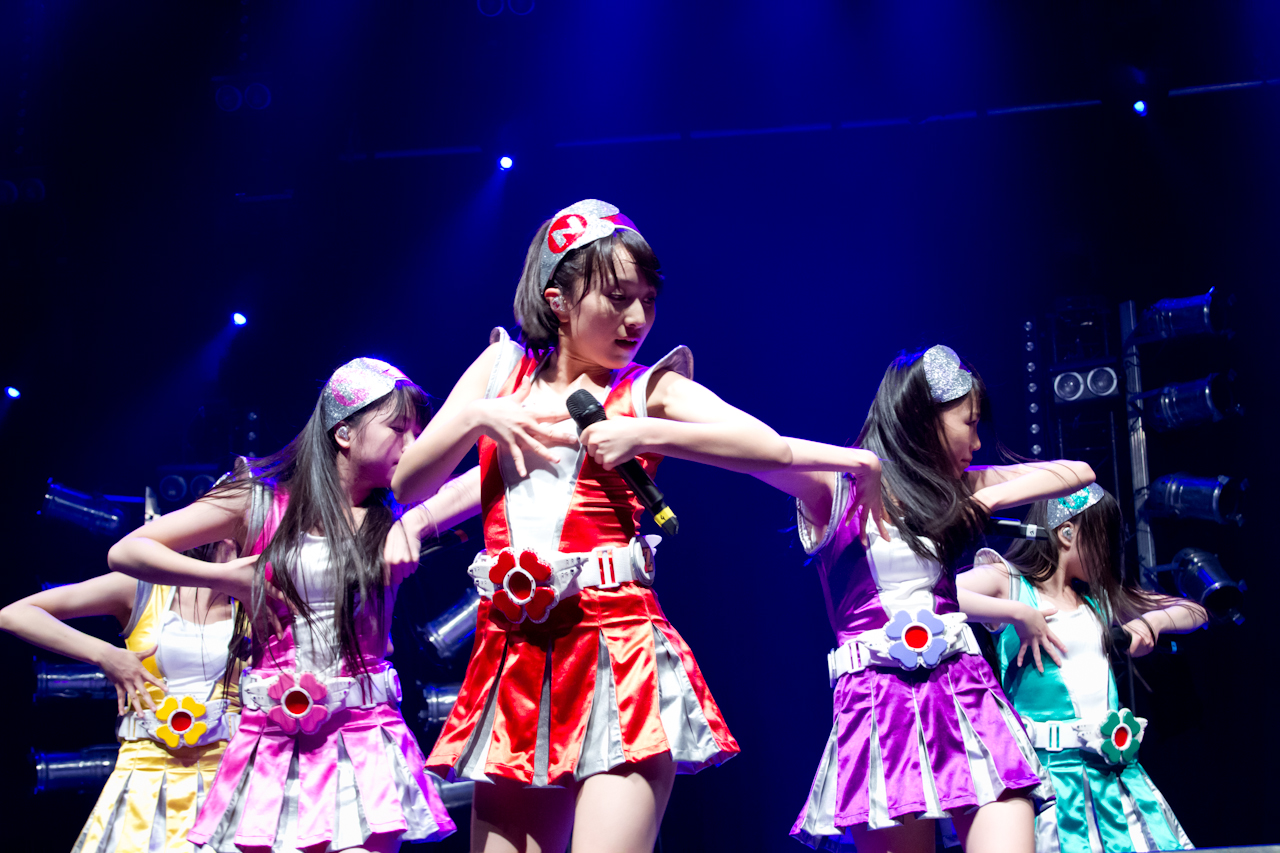
Momoiro Clover Z performed at Japan Expo 2012. The group is ranked as number one among female idol groups according to 2013–2017 surveys.

The first exposition took place in 1999 at the ISC Paris Business School and welcomed 2,400 visitors, a number which has grown steadily. In 2002, Japan Expo was hosted at the Center of New Industries and Technologies (CNIT) in La Défense, Paris.

In 2005, the event was cancelled out of security concerns due to the large number of visitors. The exposition has since moved to the larger Paris-Nord Villepinte Exhibition Centre.

In 2020 and 2021, the event was cancelled due to the global COVID-19 pandemic.

== Event history ==
Dates	Venue	Attendance	Guests
1999	ISC Paris Business School	2,400	
June 24–25, 2000	EPITA	3,200	
December 8–10, 2000	Espace Champerret	8,000	
June 29 – July 1, 2001	Espace Austerlitz	12,000	Eric Etcheverry, Brigitte Lecordier, Eric Legrand, Michel Barouille, Liliane Davis, Enrique, Jean-Pierre Savelli
July 5–7, 2002	CNIT	21,000	Nami Akimoto, and Tsutomu Nihei
July 5–6, 2003	CNIT	29,000	Keiji Goto, Nobuhiro Okaseko, and Ryosuke Sakamoto
July 2–4, 2004	CNIT	41,000	Hisashi Abe, Masakazu Katsura, Mana, Andy Seto, Hiroshi Watari, and Kanemori Yoshinori
July 1–3, 2005	Convention canceled		
July 7–9, 2006	Paris-Nord Villepinte Exhibition Center	56,000	Hitomitoi, Kenjiro Kawatsu, Morishige, Hideki Owada, Aki Shimizu, Mamiya Takizaki, Kazuhide Tomonaga, Takaharu Okuma, Plastic Tree and Anna Tsuchiya
July 6–8, 2007	Paris-Nord Villepinte Exhibition Center	83,000	Dio – Distraught Overlord, GARI, Halcali, Keiko Ichiguchi, Sachiko Kamimura, Masachika Kawata, Minae Matsukawa, Ichirou Mizuki, Junko Mizuno, Olivia Lufkin, Moon Kana, Hironobu Sakaguchi, Hiroyuki Takei, Hironobu Takeshita, Syuji Takeya, Nana Kitade and Yoshiki
July 3–6, 2008	Paris-Nord Villepinte Exhibition Center	134,467	Yutaka Izubuchi, Junko Kawakami, Toshihiro Kawamoto, Kazuo Koike, Setona Mizushiro, Go Nagai, Takeshi Obata, Oh! great, Yoshiyuki Sadamoto, Scandal, Ra:IN (Pata and Michiaki only), Munehisa Sakai, Chihiro Tamaki, Tetsuya Tsutsui, and Miyavi
July 2–5, 2009	Paris-Nord Villepinte Exhibition Center	165,501	CLAMP, AKB48, Shinichirō Watanabe, Moriyasu Taniguchi, Mizuho Nishikubo, Mitsuhisa Ishikawa, Shiori Furukawa, Akemi Takada, Natsuki Takaya, Sakae Esuno, Daisuke Nishijima, Dai Satō, Hitoshi Ichimura, Tetsuya Nishio, Junko Takeuchi, Takami Akai, Akemi Hayashi, Kazuya Hatazawa, Showtaro Morikubo, Hikari Yamaguchi, Yuuichiro Hirata, Shintaro Akiyama, Ryousuke Katoh, Kanon Wakeshima, Benjamin (Zhang Lin), Ji Di (Zu Ya-Le), Aurore, Benjamin Reiss, Ludo Lullabi, School Food Punishment, Ra:IN
July 1–4, 2010	Paris-Nord Villepinte Exhibition Center	173,680	Tsukasa Hojo, Noriyuki Iwadare, Morning Musume, An Nakahara, Masakazu Katsura, Hiro Mashima, Seikima-II, HITT & Guests, Jun Mochizuki, Suika, die!!die!!color!!!, Kazue Kato, Anipunk, Aya Kanno, Gibier du Mari, Yukari Tamura, X Japan (Toshi and Yoshiki only), Vivid
June 30 – July 3, 2011	Paris-Nord Villepinte Exhibition Center	192,000	Hangry & Angry, Dream Morning Musume (Yoshizawa and Ishikawa), DJ Shiru's K-ble Jungle Akira Yamaoka, Nobuteru Yūki, Yumiko Igarashi, H. Naoto, PASSPO☆, Head Phones President
July 5–8, 2012	Paris-Nord Villepinte Exhibition Center	219,614	Christielle Huet-Gomez, Alice Briére-Haquet, Samantha Bailly, Hideo Katsumata, Chiaki Miyamoto, Yoshihisa Kishimoto, Moto Hagio, Natsumi Aida, Mariya Nishiuchi, Hideo Baba, Katsuhiro Harada, Haruhiko Mikimoto, Masao Maruyama, Kamui, Sakizo, Triple Tails.S (Kana and Mio Shirai), Satsuki, Shiitake, Salagir, Jérôme Morel, Gogeta Jr., Marlène, Ibi, Furo and Mimi, Berrizo, Monsieur To, TroyB, Tetsuya Tsutsui, Professor Sakamoto, Kyary Pamyu Pamyu, Toshio Maeda, Ein Lee, Tetsuya Saruwatari, Anli Pollicino, Man With A Mission, Daizystripper, Makoto Shinkai, N0isY☆KidS, Rei Toma, Kohei Tanaka, Junko Iwao, Virgo a.k.a. Hammer, Hemenway, Momoiro Clover Z, Idoling!!!, Keiji Inafune, Flow, Naoki Urasawa, Top 16 French StarCraft II: Wings of Liberty players From 2012 StarCraft II World Championship Series:France Nationals
July 4–7, 2013	Paris-Nord Villepinte Exhibition Center	232,876	Tetsuo Hara, Masahiro Ikeno, Atsuhiro Iwakami, Shōji Kawamori, Kim Byung Jin, Keito Koume, Toshiyuki Kubooka, Tomonori Ochikoshi, Aya Oda, Mamiya Takizaki, Tatsuyuki Tanaka, Aki Akana, angela, °C-ute, Dear Loving, Deathgaze, Dempagumi.inc, J☆Dee'Z, Kao=S, Anam Kawashima, Kylee, May'n, Maywa Denki, Nightmare, Ninjaman Japan, Sansanar, Urbangarde, Tsubasa Masuwaka, Una, Hideo Baba, Katsuhiro Harada, Shinji Hashimoto, Yoshinori Kitase, Hisashi Koinuma, Tetsuya Nomura, Motomu Toriyama, Naoki Yoshida, Samantha Bailly, Jérôme Hamon, Shiitake, Ray Fujita, Laure Kié, Kikutaro, Katsuyuki Konishi, Natsuna, Kazma Sakamoto, Daisuke Sekimoto, Hiromu Takahashi, Junko Takeuchi
July 2–6, 2014	Paris-Nord Villepinte Exhibition Center	240,189	Moumoon, Shoko Nakagawa, Berryz Kobo, °C-ute, Nogod, Kamui Fujiwara, Izumi Matsumoto
July 2–5, 2015	Paris-Nord Villepinte Exhibition Center	247,473	Shigeru Miyamoto, Takashi Tezuka, Pink Babies, Tsubasa Sakaguchi, K-ble Jungle
July 7–10, 2016	Paris-Nord Villepinte Exhibition Center	234,852	Junichi Masuda, Hiro Mashima, Hironobu Kageyama, Psycho le Cému, Man with a Mission
July 6–9, 2017	Paris-Nord Villepinte Exhibition Center	238,241	Kenji Kamiyama, Yoshiki Sakurai
July 5–8, 2018	Paris-Nord Villepinte Exhibition Center	247,919	Buichi Terasawa, Shinichiro Watanabe, Nobuyoshi Habara, Atsushi Ohkubo, Daimaou Kosaka, Toshihiro Kawamoto, Imitoshi Yamane, Crystal Lake
July 4–7, 2019	Paris-Nord Villepinte Exhibition Center	252,510	Angela, Yuegene Fay, Yaya Han, Aya Hirano, Kamui, Mika Kobayashi, Leiji Matsumoto, Go Nagai, Akito Osuga, Ryosuke Sakamoto, Yoko Takahashi, Yoshiyuki Tomino, Dadaroma, Twin Cosplay, Tony Valente
July 2–5, 2020	Convention postponed to 2022		
July 14–17, 2022	Paris-Nord Villepinte Exhibition Center	254,084	Yuzu Natsumi, May'n, Sorgenti, Blue Encount, Yūsuke Kozaki, True, Tsukasa Hojo
July 13–16, 2023	Paris-Nord Villepinte Exhibition Centre	255,259	Tsukasa Hojo, Yuzu Natsumi, Vickeblanka, Noriko Tadano, Batten Girls, Sakurazaka46
July 11–14, 2024	Paris-Nord Villepinte Exhibition Centre	200,716	
July 3–6, 2025	Paris-Nord Villepinte Exhibition Centre		Junji Ito, Yoko Takahashi, Kazuhiko Torishima, Toyotarou, Oh! Great, Broken by the Scream
July 9-12, 2026	Paris-Nord Villepinte Exhibition Centre		

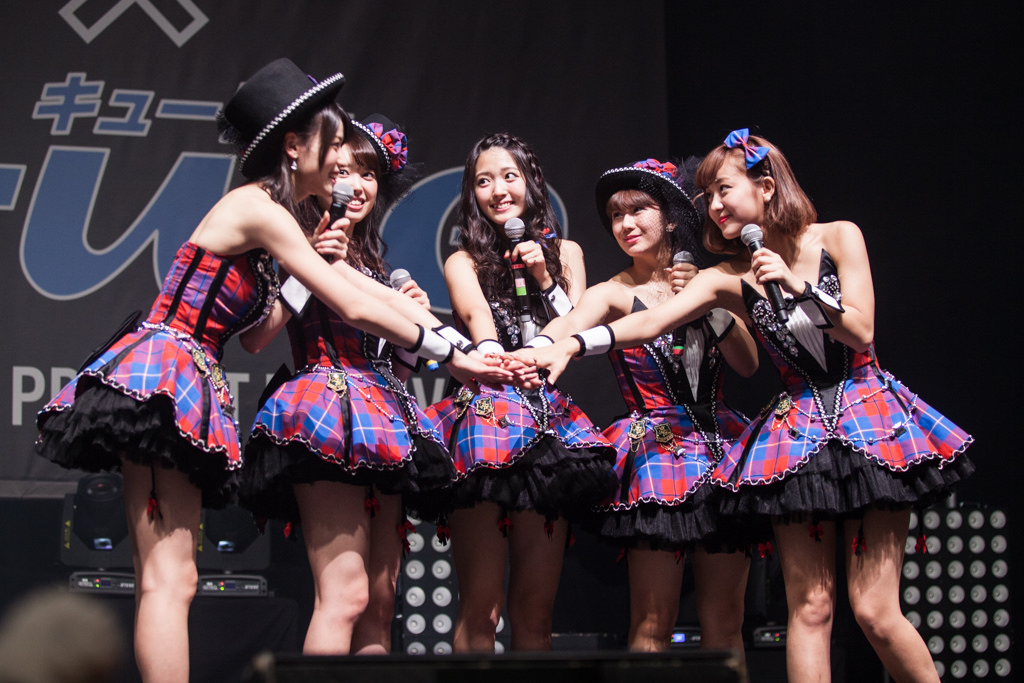
°C-ute at Japan Expo 2014

== Japan Expo in other cities ==
Other than the main convention in Paris, Japan Expo has expanded to 4 cities in 3 countries on 2 continents:

- France
  - Japan Expo Centre in Orléans
  - Japan Expo Sud in Marseille
  - Chibi Japan Expo in Montreuil
- Belgium
  - Japan Expo Belgium in Brussels
- US
  - Japan Expo USA in Santa Clara, California
