= Bratty =

Bratty may refer to:

- Bratty (musical project), musical project of Jenny Juárez
- Joe Bratty (c. 1961–1994), Northern Irish loyalist paramilitary and member of the Ulster Defence Association
- Bratty v A-G for Northern Ireland, a 1963 British court case dealing with automatism

== See also ==
- Brat (disambiguation)
