= Broken by the Scream =

Japanese musical group

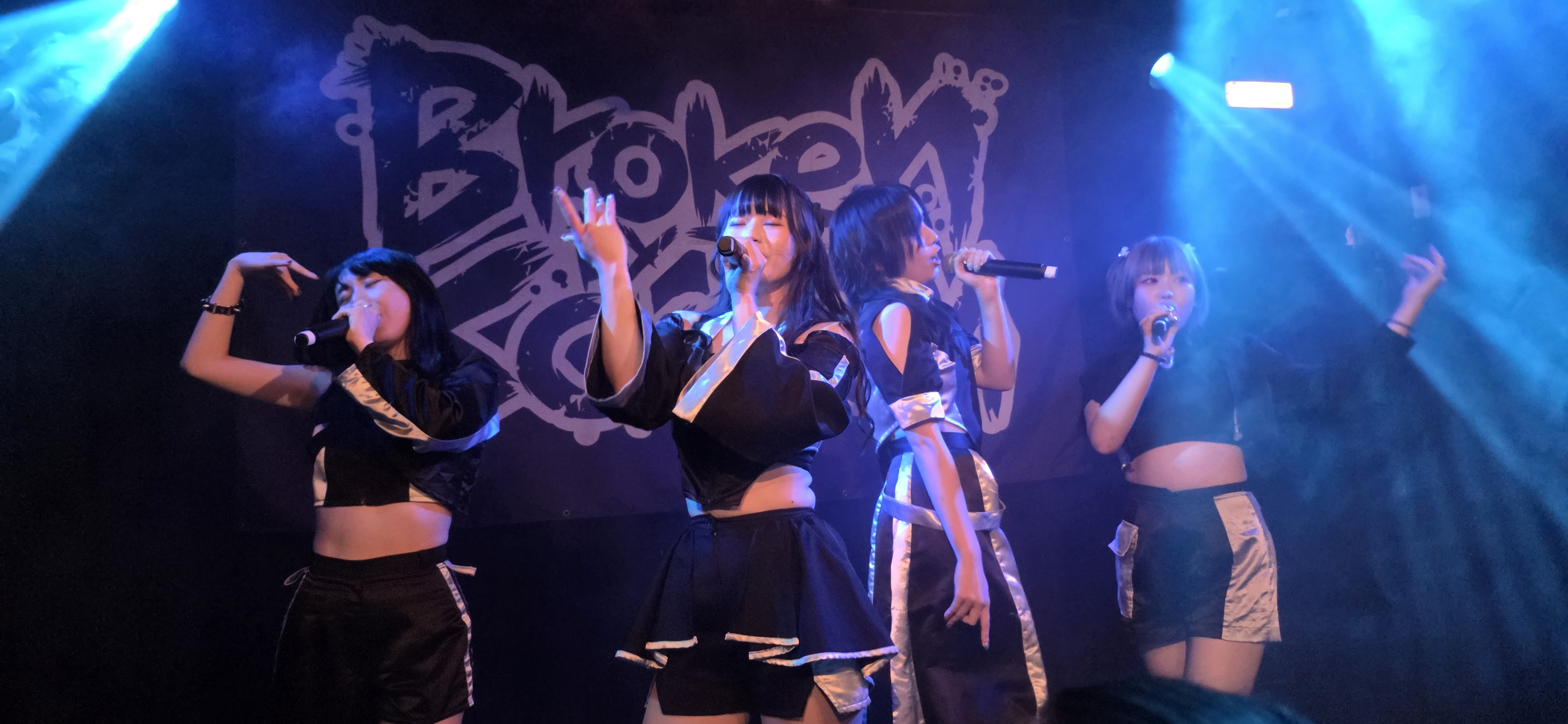
- Broken by the Scream performing in May 2025; L-R: Io, Tsubaki, Yayoi, Shizuku

Background information
- Also known as: BBTS
- Origin: Tokyo, Japan
- Genres: J-metal; metalcore; deathcore; djent; progressive metal
- Years active: 2016–present
- Label: Ground-Base • Dawn Dead • Metal Blade Records • Blood Blast Distribution
- Members: Io Nozukidaira; Nanaougi Tsubaki; Mikogami Shizuku; Takayashiki Yayoi
- Past members: Yabusame Ayame; Mitateda Sumire; Kumanomido Yae; Uriin Kagura
- Website: brokenbythescream.jp

Broken by the Scream is a Japanese metal idol group from Tokyo.

== History ==
The formation of the group was announced in October 2016 and debuted some months later in January 2017. The group played their first United States concert as part of Saboten-con in Phoenix, Arizona in September 2019. Followed by Katsu-con in Washington DC in February 2023 and Anime Los Angeles in January 2024. The group also made its Europe debut at multiple festivals later in 2024.A North and Latin America tour slated for April 2024 had to be postponed due to visa issues. In the summer of 2024 the group toured Europe, playing shows in Germany and at the Motocultor Festival in France.

Broken by the Scream contributed a song for the video game Onee Chanbara Origin which led to the group gaining its first international recognition. After the release of two EPs in 2017, the group published their debut album An Alien's Portrait a year later, followed by the second album Noisy Night Fever in 2019. Their third album, Rise Into Chaos which was first published in Japan via Tokuma was internationally released by JPU Records in November 2022.

In early 2023, the band met Christian Nakanishi, singer of the Swedish Eurodance band Rednex and producer of several Japanese projects. He continues to strongly influence Broken By The Scream's career, enabling tours, festival appearances, and a contract with Metal Blade Records in 2026.

In August 2023, it was announced that Uriin Kagura and Yabusame Ayame were to leave the group. While Yabusame left the group on her own wish, Uriin had to quit due to a poor health condition. An audition was held to cast new members. Later Shizuku Mikogami and Yayoi Takayashiki were announced to have joined the group. In September 2024, the EP ReMake Them Joy was released.

The band is set to tour Europe for a second time, with two concerts held in Germany as well as an appearance at Resurrection Fest in Spain and at Japan Expo in France. In August 2025, the band will release their fourth studio album entitled Solar Strain. As their first single, the band released a music video for the eponymous 14-minute song "Tsuioku no Nasuka" on YouTube.

In 2026, the band performed at Wacken Open Air. On February 5, 2026, it was announced that the band had been signed to Metal Blade Records.

== Discography ==
=== Studio albums ===
- An Alien's Portrait (2018)
- Noisy Night Fever (2019)
- Rise Into Chaos (2022)
- Solar Strain (2025)

=== Extended plays ===
- Broken by the Scream (2017)
- Screaming Rhapsody (2017)
- Whitewater Park (2023)
- ReMake Them Joy (2024)

== Videography ==
=== Video albums ===
- Killswitch Young Lad (2020)
- Six Feet Over Killing!! (2021)
- Obscura Burns Red (2022)

=== Music videos ===
Year	Song	Album
2017	"「oh！my！ME・GA・MIに恋してる！」"	Broken by the Scream
2018	"Koi ha otome no nakidokoro"	An Alien's Portrait
2018	"Sayonara Birthday"	An Alien's Portrait
2019	"Haruurara"	Noisy Night Fever
2019	"Ai wa Kimi no Mono"	Noisy Night Fever
2020	"Gyakutenno Kanewa Naru"	Rise into Chaos
2022	"Kanjou Cross Counter"	Rise into Chaos
2022	"Kokoro Harebare"	Rise into Chaos
2023	"Kagerou" (feat. Isam and Eyegargoyle)	Whitewater Park
2024	"Gekko Karen Stripe"	Solar Strain
2024	"Yumehanabi"	Screaming Rhapsody
2025	"Tsuioku no Nazca"	Solar Strain

== Members ==
Current members

- Io Nozukidaira – growls (2016–present)
- Nanaougi Tsubaki – clean vocals (2021–present)
- Mikogami Shizuku – clean vocals (2023–present)
- Takayashiki Yayoi – screams (2024–present)

Former members

- Yabusame Ayame – clean vocals (2016–2023)
- Mitateda Sumire – screams (2016–2017)
- Kumanomido Yae – clean vocals (2016–2021)
- Uriin Kagura – screams (2017–2023)

== Links ==
- Official Homepage (Japanese, English)
