= Rain (Japanese band) =

Japanese rock band

Ra:IN
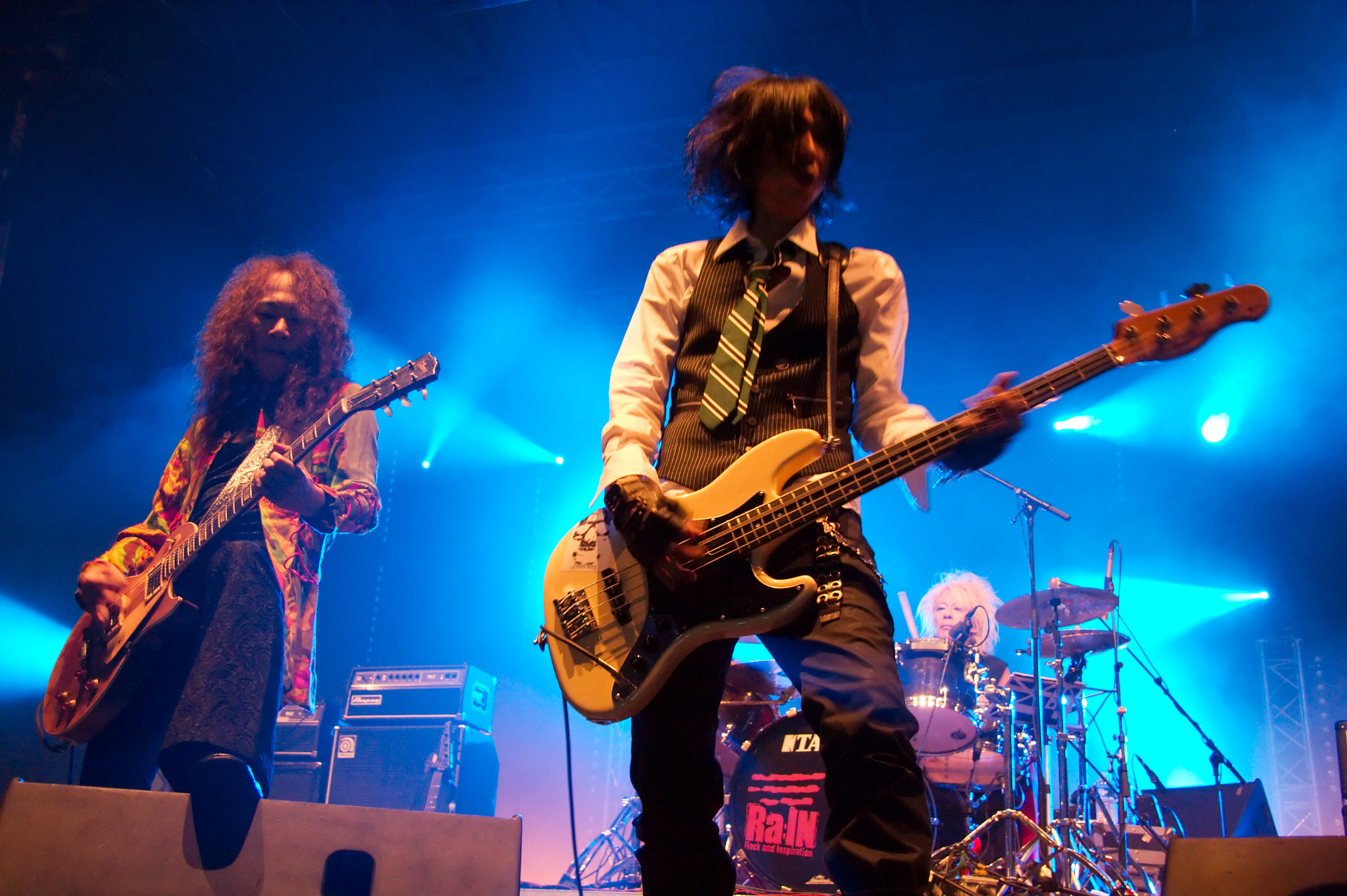
- Ra:IN at Japan Expo in Paris, 2009.

Background information
- Origin: Japan
- Genres: Instrumental rock; hard rock; progressive rock
- Years active: 2002–present
- Label: Danger Crue
- Members: Pata; Michiaki; DIE; Ryu
- Past members: Tetsu
- Website: Official site

Ra:IN (an acronym for "Rock and Inspiration") is a Japanese instrumental rock band. Formed in 2002 by guitarist Pata, bassist Michiaki and drummer Tetsu, the group is signed to the Danger Crue label. The only things that the musicians decide on in advance are a song's title, intro and ending, everything else is improvised. Former hide with Spread Beaver keyboardist DIE joined the band in May 2007, and Tetsu left in April 2014, being replaced on the drums by Ryu. They have released three albums, three singles, and have toured extensively, including international shows in China, Taiwan, France, Italy, Germany, Spain and Russia.

== History ==
Ra:IN was formed as a power trio in summer 2002 with Pata on guitar, Michiaki on bass and Tetsu on drums. According to Pata, he was drinking at the bar owned by Tetsu, who previously played on the album Pat.#0002 (1999) by his duo P.A.F., when Michiaki arrived and told the drummer they should form a new band. Tetsu agreed and when one of them asked who else should be in it, they both looked at Pata. They were named by Masayoshi Kabe, Michiaki's bandmate in Zoku Zoku Kazoku. After their first show in October or November 2002, Ra:IN went on their first tour in December, with their debut maxi-single "The Border" released in April of next year. It was followed by their first album The Line in November. They had their first overseas performances in 2004; Shanghai on April 24–25 and one in Taipei in July. RaIN performed three shows in Paris in May 2005, and at the closing of the hide museum on September 9 back in Japan. At the museum show, they were joined by former hide with Spread Beaver keyboardist DIE as a guest.

They released their second album Before the Siren, their first on popular independent record label Danger Crue, in March 2006 and embarked on tour in support of it, which included two more shows in Taipei. In 2007 they released the DVD Hard Rain and Rocks Live and performed two shows in Beijing, one of which was at the Beijing Pop Festival. That year, DIE officially joined the band as keyboardist. Their third album Metal Box was released in Japan in April 2008 and in France the following month. They also performed at the hide memorial summit at Ajinomoto Stadium on May 3.

In June 2009 Ra:IN began a lengthy European tour which took them to Rome, Ljubljana, Budapest, Warsaw, Gdynia, Berlin, Cologne, Moscow, Paris, Madrid, and ended in Hradec Králové at the Rock for People festival. The band released a special single sold only on the tour, titled "Circle/Psychogenic". They held the two man Rock’n Roll Vaudeville 2011 show together with Der Zibet on June 24, 2011. In September 2012, Ra:IN performed alongside Der Zibet, Ladies Room and Tokyo Yankees at the Yokohama Summer Rock Fes. – Revolution Rocks 2012.

It was announced on April 17, 2014 that Tetsu had left the group. Ra:IN performed in the United States at A-Kon on June 6–8, and Ryu officially joined the band as drummer on June 28. In January 2020, Ra:IN had to cancel two shows after Pata caught influenza. Ra:IN celebrated their 20th anniversary in 2022. They began the Look at the Sky tour on July 29, 2023, and released a maxi CD sold only on the tour. Their first release of music in 15 years, it includes "Look at the Sky" and re-recordings of "Circle" and "Psychogenic". On May 12, 2025, Ra:IN cancelled their tour that was set to begin in June when it was learned that Pata had a spinal fracture, in addition to a previously known leg injury that made it difficult for him to stand for long periods of time. They returned to the stage at Yokohama Bay Hall on August 11, performing at the What is Jam? Vol. 10 event hosted by Pata's X Japan bandmate Sugizo's band Shag.

== Members ==
The members of Ra:IN are credited exclusively by their given or stage names.

- Tomoaki "Pata" Ishizuka (石塚 智昭) – guitar (2002–present) (X Japan, P.A.F., Dope HEADz)
- Michiaki Suzuki (鈴木享明) – bass (2002–present) (Tensaw, The Toys, Zoku Zoku Kazoku, Mosaw)
- Daijiro "DIE" Nozawa (野澤大二郎) – keyboards (2007–present) (hide with Spread Beaver, Loopus, Minimum Rockets, Kiss the World)
- Ryuichi "Ryu" Nishida (西田竜一) – drums (2014–present) (Novela)

Former members

- Tetsu Mukaiyama (向山テツ) – drums (2002–2014) (Daizo & Elephants, P.A.F., Red Warriors, Cocco)
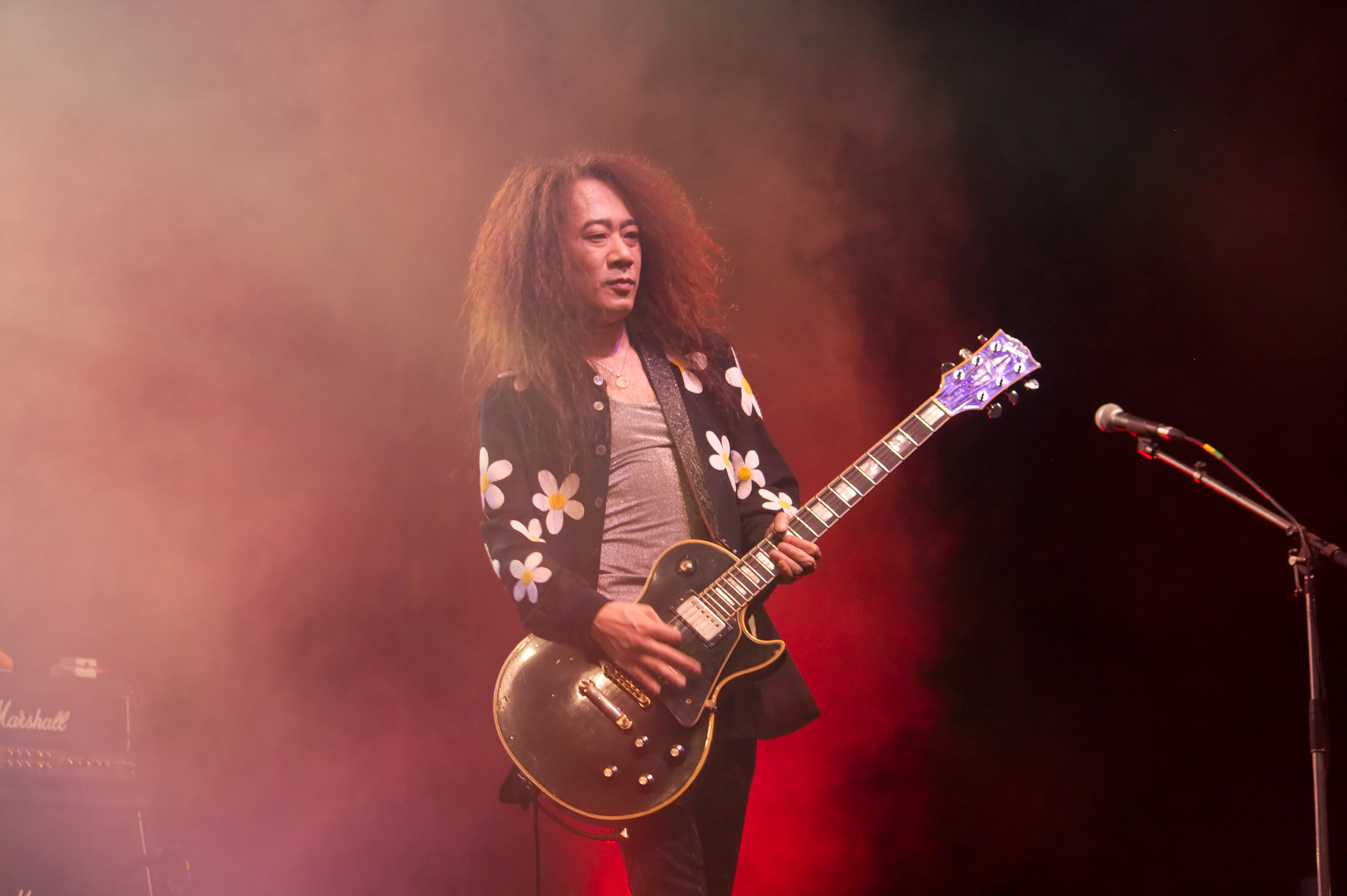
Pata

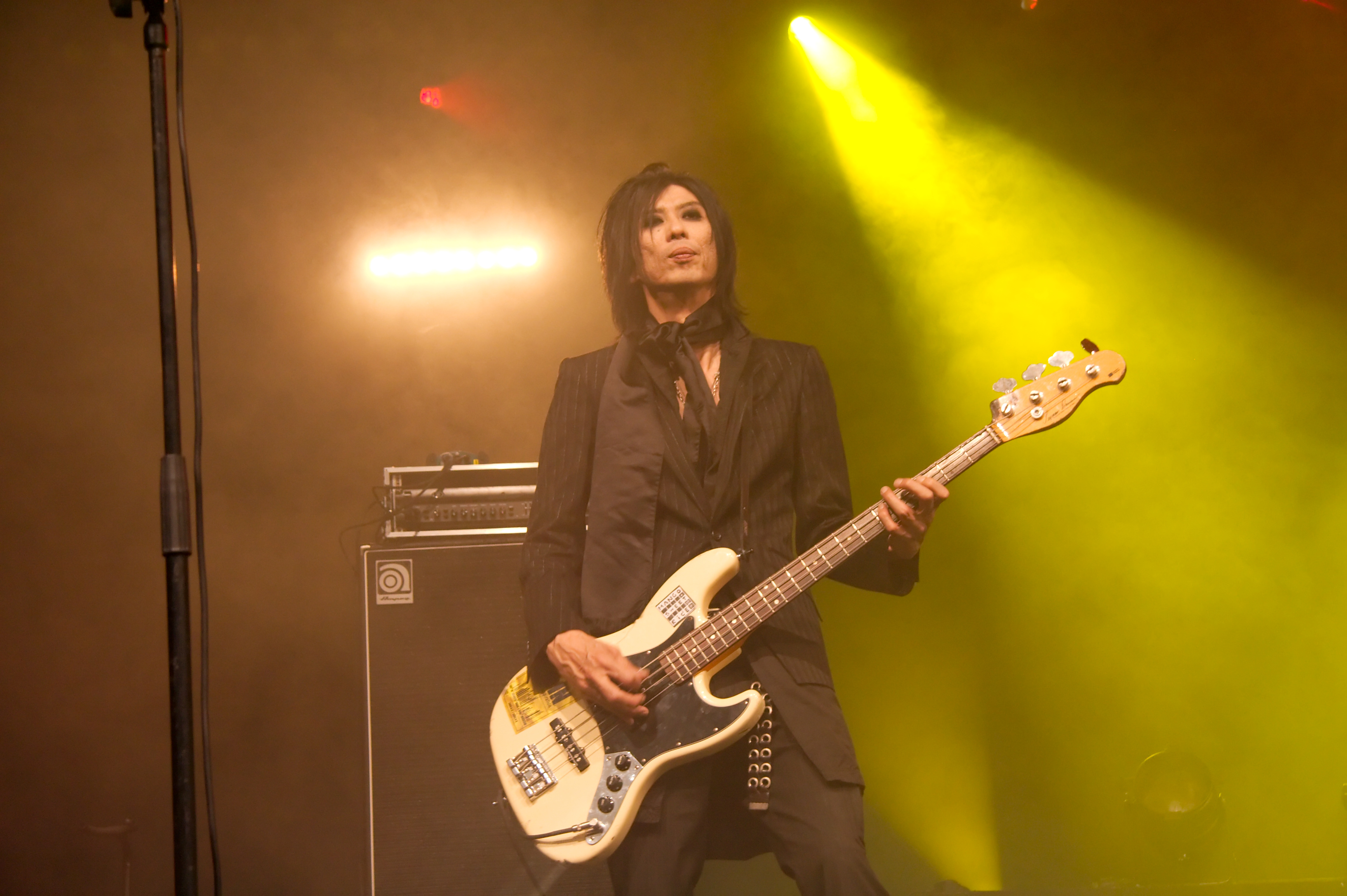
Michiaki

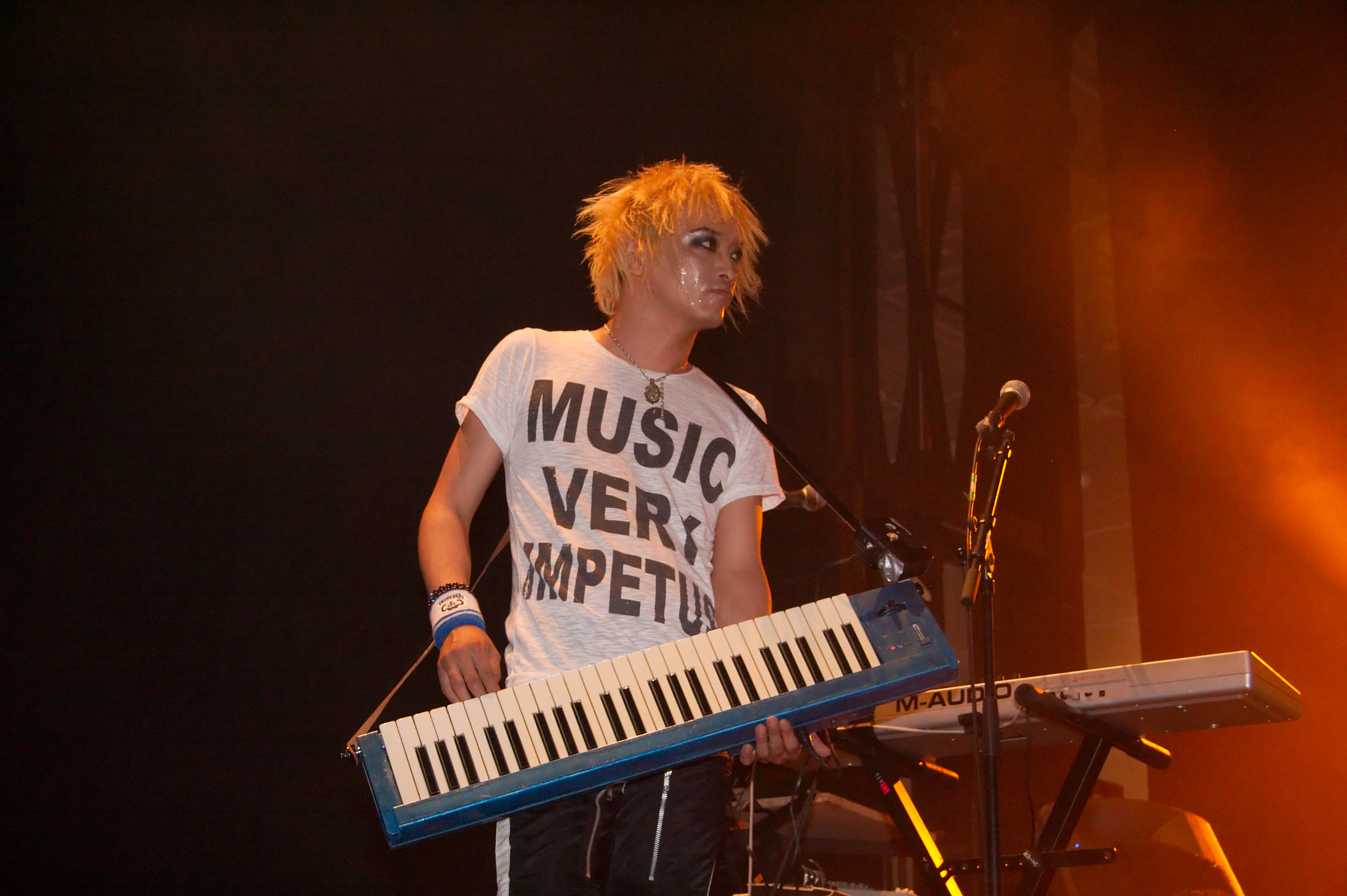
DIE

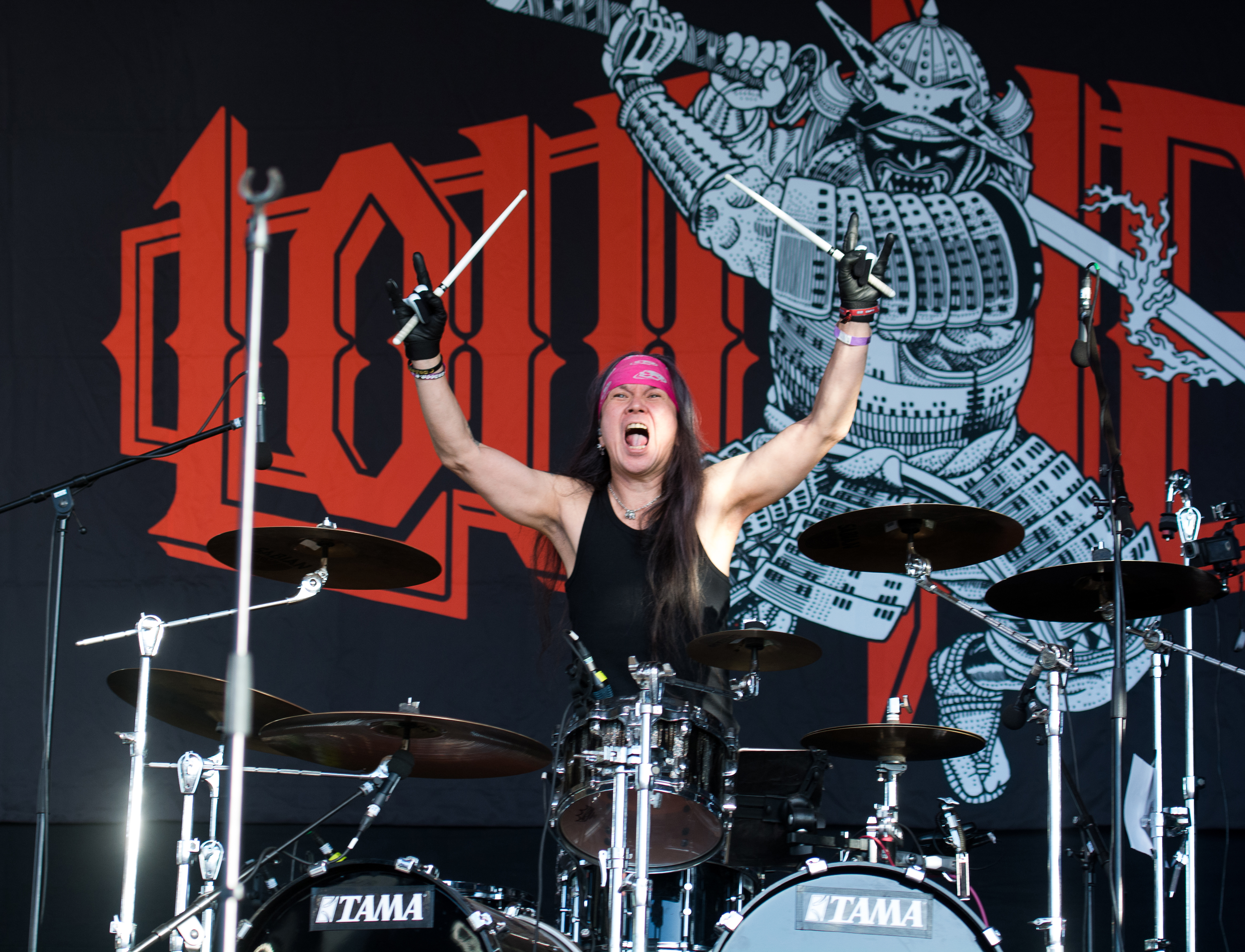
Ryu

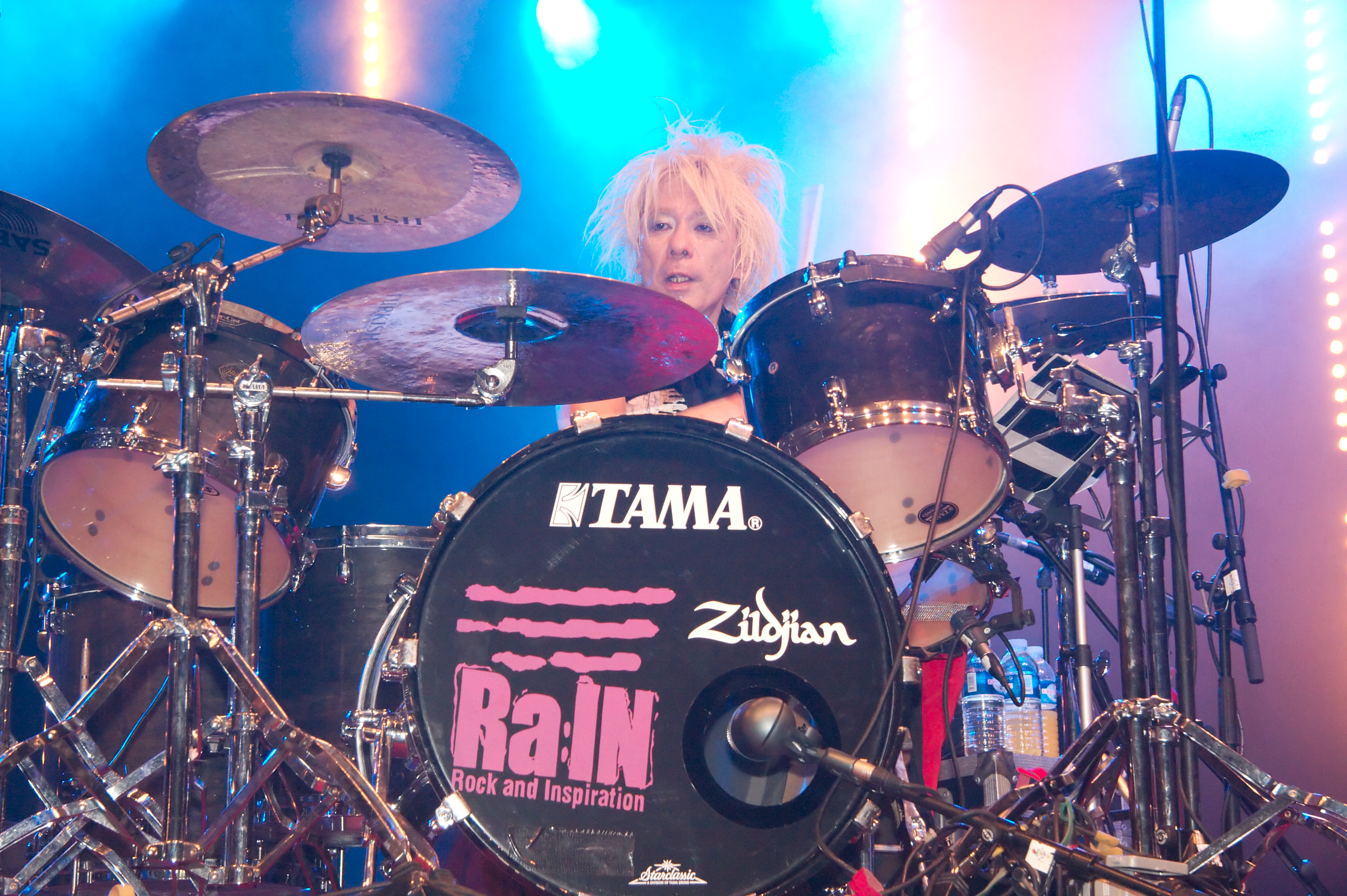
Tetsu

== Discography ==
Albums

- The Line (November 7, 2003)
- Before the Siren (March 8, 2006)
- Metal Box (April 9, 2008)

Singles

- "The Border" (April 3, 2003)
- "Circle/Psychogenic" (2009, Special Edition EP sold on their 2009 European tour)
- "Look at the Sky/Circle/Psychogenic" (2023, Maxi-CD sold only on their 2023 Look at the Sky tour)

Home videos

- Hard Rain & Rocks Live (July 9, 2007)
