= Matt Bell (author) =

American writer

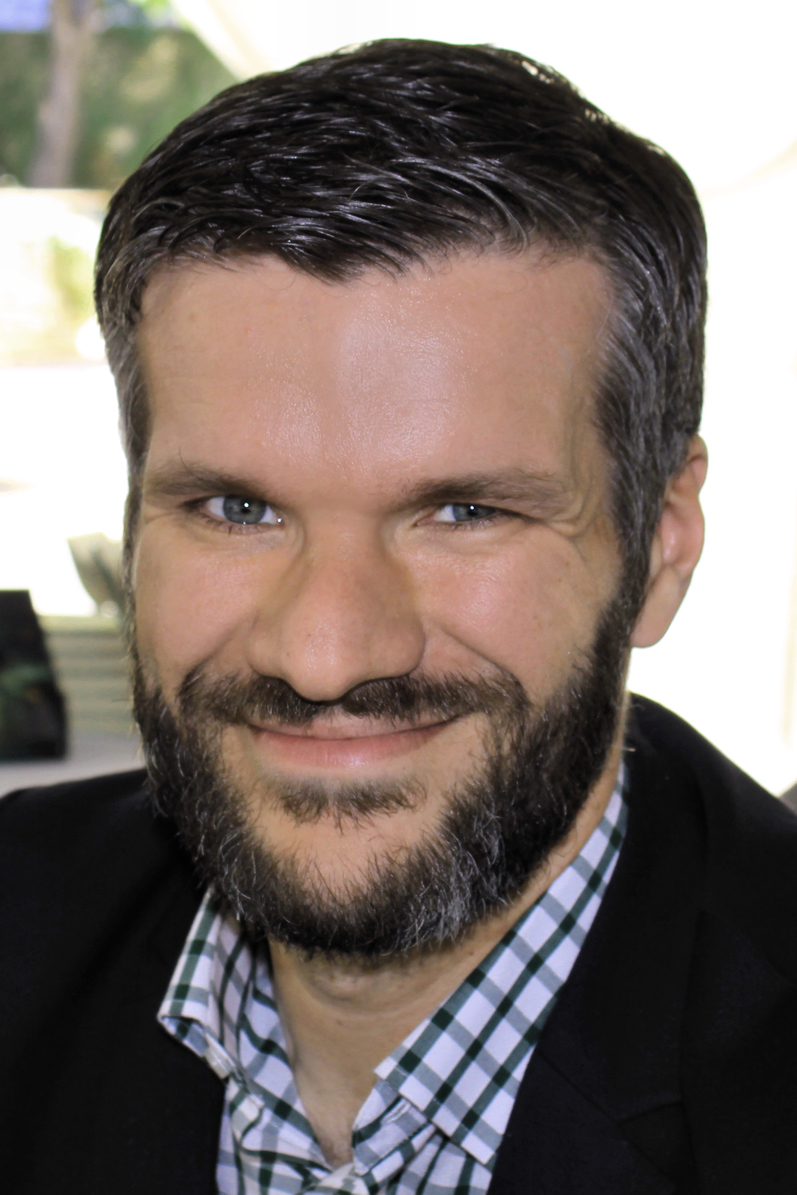
- Bell at the 2015 Texas Book Festival.
- Born: August 29, 1980 (age 46); Saginaw, Michigan, U.S.
- Education: Oakland University (BA); Bowling Green State University (MFA)
- Occupation: Writer
- Writing career
- Genres: Literary fiction, dark fantasy, horror fiction, non-fiction, experimental fiction
- Website: mdbell.com

Matt Bell (born August 29, 1980) is an American writer. He is the author of Appleseed (2021), How They Were Found (2010), and Cataclysm Baby (2012). His stories have been anthologized in The Best American Mystery Stories, Best American Fantasy, and 30 Under 30: an Anthology of Innovative Fiction by Younger Writers.

== Early life and education ==
Bell grew up in Hemlock, Michigan. He received a BA in English from Oakland University and an MFA in Fiction from Bowling Green State University.

== Career ==
In 2012, he took a position as an assistant professor in the English department at Northern Michigan University. He currently teaches in the English department at Arizona State University, where he directs the ASU Worldbuilding Initiative.

Bell is the senior editor at Dzanc Books, as well as the founding editor of The Collagist, a monthly online literary magazine. His short fiction has also appeared in numerous literary magazines, including Conjunctions, Hayden's Ferry Review, Gulf Coast, Guernica, Willow Springs, Unsaid, The New York Times, Esquire, Tin House, Fairy Tale Review, Orion, and American Short Fiction.

Bell's short story collection How They Were Found was reviewed favorably in multiple publications including The Believer, The Rumpus, TriQuarterly, and American Book Review. At HTMLGIANT, Kyle Minor wrote: "Matt Bell has built a national reputation on his own terms, completely outside the support system of New York publishing, on the strength of his stories and novellas, which are wholly original and singularly his own. He is that rare sort of writer whose work the reader would recognize even if were published anonymously. It is formally daring, high-stakes, languaged-up stuff, and (lucky us!), the best of it has finally been collected at book length."

His first novel, In the House upon the Dirt between the Lake and the Woods, was a finalist for the 2014 Young Lions Fiction Award. It was an Indies Choice Adult Debut Book of the Year Honor Recipient and the winner of the Paula Anderson Book Award.

Bell's third novel, Appleseed, was shortlisted for the 2022 Ursula K. Le Guin Prize for Fiction. It was a 2021 New York Times Notable Book and a Philadelphia Inquirer Best Book of the Year. Cleveland Review of Books called the book's prose "visceral and sensuous" as it explored humanity's "narrow, immediate, and self-serving worldview."

His next novel, Penitent, is forthcoming in 2028 from Doubleday Books. His next non-fiction book, Typo, part of Bloosmbury's Object Lessons series, is set to be published in September 2027.

== Bibliography ==
=== Short story collections ===
- How the Broken Lead the Blind (Willows Wept Press, 2009)
- How They Were Found (Keyhole Press, 2010)
- A Tree or a Person or a Wall (Soho Press, 2016)

=== Novellas ===
- The Collectors (Caketrain Press, 2009)
- Cataclysm Baby (Mud Luscious Press, 2012)

=== Novels ===
- In the House upon the Dirt between the Lake and the Woods (Soho Press, 2013)
- Scrapper (Soho Press, 2015)
- Appleseed: A Novel (Custom House, 2021)

=== Non-fiction ===
- Baldur's Gate II (Boss Fight Books, 2015)
- Refuse to Be Done: How to Write and Rewrite a Novel in Three Drafts (Soho Press, 2022)
