= Brat Pack (disambiguation) =

Brat Pack were a group of young actors in the 1980s.

Brat Pack may also refer to:

- Brat Pack (literary), a group of young authors in the 1980s
- Brat Pack (comics), a limited series of comic books by Rick Veitch
- The Brat Pack (duo), an American vocal duo
- "Brat Pack", a song by The Rocket Summer from Hello, Good Friend
