= Steve Bratt =

American businessman

Steven R. Bratt
- Born: February 10, 1957 (age 69); New York City, U.S.
- Website: www.webfoundation.org

Steven Richard Bratt (/brɒt/; born February 10, 1957) has served as Leader of the MITRE Health Standards and Interoperability Group, Chief Technology Officer and President of Standards Development for GS1, chief executive officer of the World Wide Web Foundation and the World Wide Web Consortium (W3C) and in other science and technology positions.

== Early history ==
Steve Bratt is the first of son Richard Wiegand and Janet Lewis Bratt. He has a brother, Carl Bratt. Born in New York City while his father was in the Navy, the family moved shortly thereafter to Syracuse, New York. He attended Walberta Park and Cherry Road Elementary Schools and Westhill High School.

Bratt received a B.S. in Geological Sciences from Pennsylvania State University in 1979. He received his Ph.D. in geophysics from the Massachusetts Institute of Technology in 1985.

Starting in 1985, Bratt led research initiatives at Science Applications International Corporation and later served as the program manager at Defense Advanced Research Projects Agency developing advanced concepts for real-time global sensor monitoring, intelligent data analysis, and international telecommunications. By 1993, Bratt was integrating Web technologies into monitoring systems as a means of data sharing and collaboration. Bratt was a scientific advisor to the U.S. delegation to the Comprehensive Nuclear Test Ban Treaty negotiations in Geneva, Switzerland from their start in 1993 through their conclusion in 1996. In 1997, he was named the first Coordinator of the International Data Centre in Vienna, Austria, of the preparatory commission for the Comprehensive Nuclear-Test-Ban Treaty Organization.

== World Wide Web Consortium (W3C) ==
In 2002, Bratt became the chief executive officer for the World Wide Web Consortium (W3C) while also holding the position of Research Scientist within the Massachusetts Institute of Technology's Computer Science and Artificial Intelligence Laboratory. Founded in 1994 by Web inventor Tim Berners-Lee, the W3C is the main international standards organization for the World Wide Web. The W3C recommends the technical standards that underpin the Web, and that aim to make the Web accessible for all people. Bratt was responsible for strategic and budget planning, coordinating the standards process, annual meetings, legal matters, relations with W3C's member organizations and liaisons with other standards bodies.

== World Wide Web Foundation (Web Foundation) ==
In 2008 Bratt collaborated once again with Tim Berners-Lee to develop the concept for a new World Wide Web Foundation—an international, not-for-profit organization to advance the Web as a medium that empowers people to bring about positive change. Later that year, they secured a $5 million grant over a 5-year period from the John S. and James L. Knight Foundation to seed the launch of the Web Foundation. Bratt became Chief Executive Office of the Web Foundation at the end of 2008 and left W3C in July 2009 to lead the Web Foundation on a full-time basis.

== GS1 ==
Bratt joined GS1 in December 2012. GS1 is the international, non-profit organization that develops and coordinates the identification system that drives global business. This system is manifested through the ubiquitous barcodes, RFID tags, and other standards for identifying and sharing data about entities, assets, products, services, locations and people. Bratt was responsible for the GS1's Global Standards Management Process (GSMP), exploration of new technologies for possible future standardization, design and operation of the information technology systems supporting the GS1 global operations and management of the Princeton, New Jersey office.

== The MITRE Corporation ==
Bratt joined MITRE in 2017, serving as Leader of the Health Standards and Interoperability Group, and Program Manager for the Common Oncology Data Elements Extensions (CodeX) HL7 FHIR Accelerator. CodeX is a multi-stakeholder community aiming to address the need to obtain high-quality, interoperable, computable data to improve cancer care and research.

== Personal information ==
Bratt was the Chief Running Officer of Winchester Highlanders Road Running Club and was the keyboardist of a band called SIX.

He is currently keyboardist for the band King Tide, and volunteering with the Lower Cape Outreach Council and MIT Club of Cape Cod . He continues to run.

== See also ==
- World Wide Web Foundation
- World Wide Web Consortium
- Sir Tim Berners-Lee
- GS1
