= Bratt-Smiley House =

Historic house in Arkansas, United States

- U.S. National Register of Historic Places
- U.S. Historic district – Contributing property
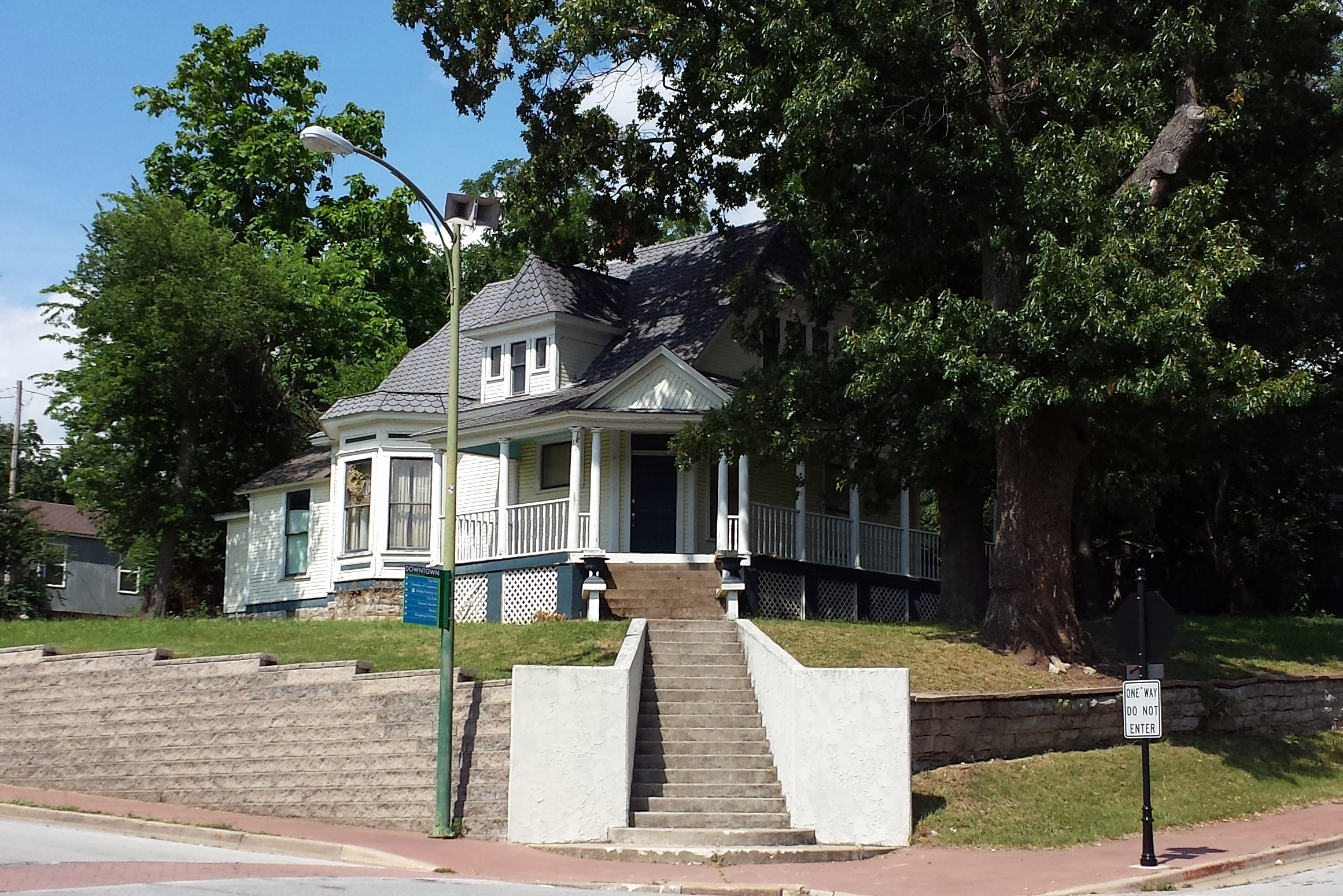

- Location within Arkansas Location within the United States
- Location: University and Broadway, Siloam Springs, Arkansas
- Coordinates: 36°11′13″N 94°32′26″W
- Area: less than one acre
- Built: 1900
- Architectural style: Colonial Revival, Queen Anne
- Part of: Siloam Springs Downtown Historic District (ID94001338)
- MPS: Benton County MRA
- NRHP reference No.: 87002428

Significant dates
- Added to NRHP: January 28, 1988
- Designated CP: May 26, 1995

The Bratt-Smiley House is a historic house at University Street and Broadway in Siloam Springs, Arkansas.

== Description ==
It is a 1 1/2-story wood-frame structure, with asymmetrical massing typical of the Queen Anne period. It has a wraparound porch supported by Tuscan columns, with an angled shingled gable pediment at the corner. Above the porch on the southern facade is a clipped-gable projection with three sash windows, while on the west there is a projecting bay section beyond the end of the porch. Built c. 1900, it is a fine local example of transitional Queen Anne/Colonial Revival architecture.

== History ==
The house was listed on the National Register of Historic Places in 1988.

== See also ==
- National Register of Historic Places listings in Benton County, Arkansas
