= Carolyn Bratt =

American lawyer and activist

Carolyn S. Bratt (born 1943 in Suffern, New York) is an activist and emeritus law professor at the University of Kentucky. She has been faculty at the University of Kentucky College of Law since 1975.

== Career ==
Bratt attended the State University of New York at Albany in 1965 with a major in History. She taught middle school history from 1965 to 1974 in the Syracuse (N.Y.) public school system. In 1969, Bratt and another teacher filed a lawsuit against the Board of Education of the Syracuse City School District because they claimed they had not been paid for coaching extramural basketball, as they should have been according to the collective bargaining agreement between the teachers' union and the city, and that additionally, male colleagues were paid for coaching basketball while the women were not. Before a decision was made in the case, Bratt and co-appellant Marilyn J. Patrick filed a Title IX complaint with the State Division of Human Rights alleging discrimination on the basis of sex. The latter organization helped mediate the decision, but subsequently, the board claimed that the state division had no right to hear the case and the Board of Education filed suit against the State Division of Human Rights in 1971.

In 1974, Bratt graduated magna cum laude and in the Order of the Coif from Syracuse University's College of Law. She then clerked for the Presiding Justice of the New York Supreme Court from 1974 to 1975. In 1975, Bratt moved to Lexington, Kentucky, to work as a professor at the UK College of Law. She was promoted to full professor in 1984. She was named the Alumni Professor of Law in 1984 and became the W.L. Matthews Professor of Law in 1989. Between 1992 and 1993, she was a Fellow with the American Council of Education. That same year, Bratt consulted for the appellants on the Kentucky v. Wasson lawsuit, which went all the way to Kentucky's Supreme Court and eventually struck down the state's criminalization of sex between same-sex partners. The decision was seen as a major win for LBGT rights. She is currently a professor emeritus at the University of Kentucky.

Bratt was the first woman to serve on the University of Kentucky's Board of Trustees; she served as legal advisor to Kentucky Governor John Y. Brown's Commission on Full Equality for Women; she served on the Association of American University Women's National Legal Advocacy Fund; and she also served as the chair of Kentucky Governor Martha Layne Collin's Governor's Commission on Women. She was also a member of the Kentucky Registry of Election Finance.

== Activism ==
Bratt's social activism is a consistent part of her personal and academic life. She is a member of the American Civil Liberties Union in Lexington, and she lobbied the state legislature on a bill that would criminalize domestic abuse, as well helping establish safe houses for domestic abuse victims. She received the Hall of Fame award in 2003 from the Kentucky Commission on Human Rights for her general work in civil rights and women's rights in the state.
