= Urbangarde =

Japanese band

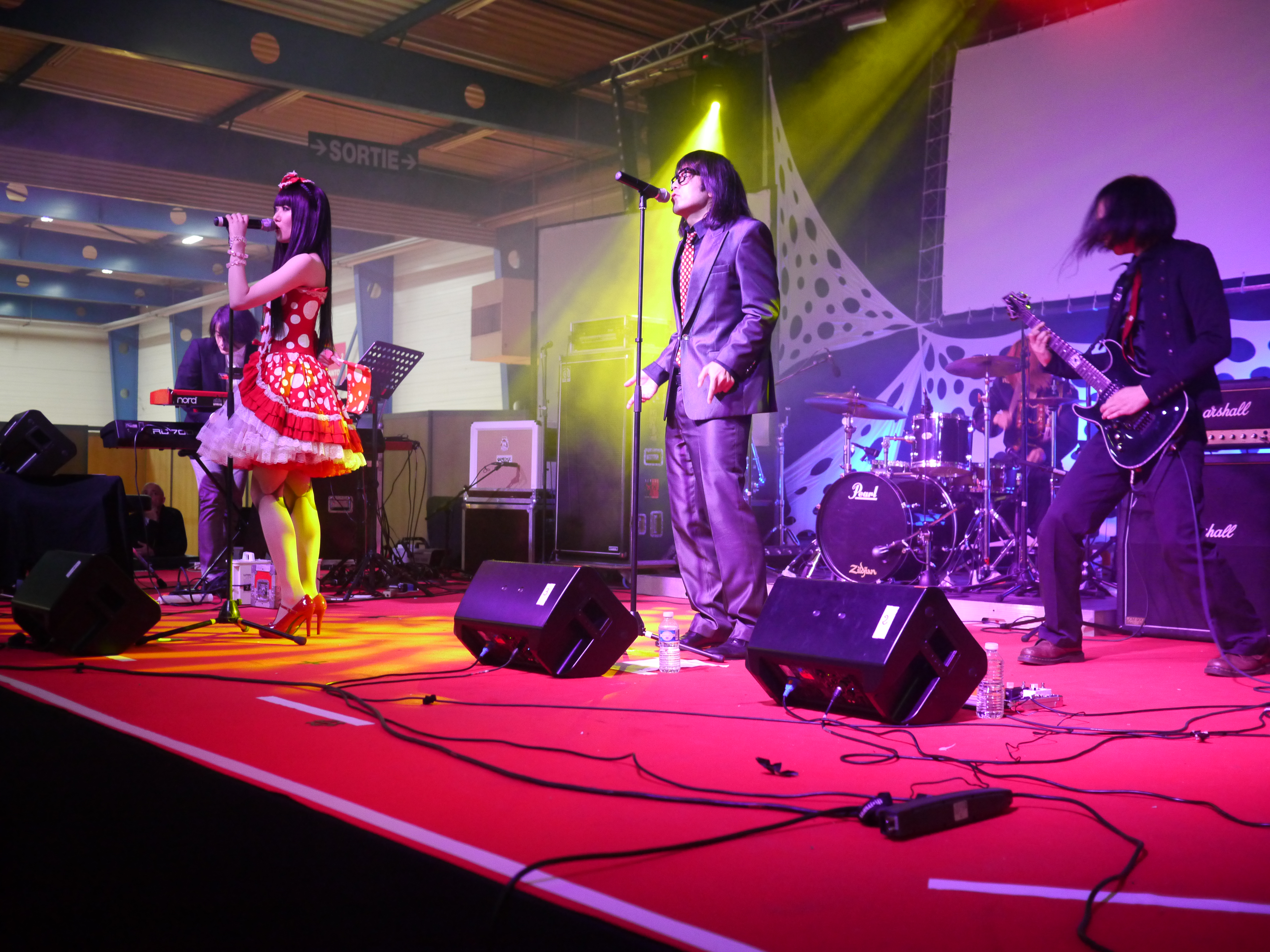
Urbangarde performing live at Toulouse Game Show in 2012

Urbangarde (アーバンギャルド, Ābangyarudo)** is a Japanese band active since 2002. Based in Tokyo, the current lineup consists of Yoko Hamasaki, also known as Yokotan (vocals), Temma Matsunaga, also known as Tenma (vocals) and Kei Okubo (keyboards). Former members include guitarist Zeze Shin, known as Shinsama, drummer Kyoichi Kagiyama, known as Kyouchan, and Kei Yachimura, known as Yashi, who was a keyboardist during the band's early stages.

Urbangarde's music is characterized by a blend of electronic, pop, rock, and various other musical styles. The band's lyrics often address social issues in Japan, such as the high suicide rate, teen prostitution, teen pregnancy, death, and disease. The band's name is a fusion of the word "urban" and the French term "avant-garde," meaning experimental or innovative.

== Style and influences ==
Urbangarde's musical styles vary from bubblegum pop to 80s style synthpop, punk, progressive rock, chiptune, new wave, goth, industrial and heavy metal. The members of the band sometimes define what they do as "Tokyo Virginity Pop" or "Trauma Techno Pop". The use of visual arts to support their music and ideas is a large part of their act, which includes elements of performance art, otome (virginal) and Lolita fashion. They have also been known to read poetry during live shows. Matsunaga is responsible for the artistic aspects of the band and notably writes the lyrics, takes care of the general design of the band's image, and handles promotional and music videos. Their numerous music videos often incorporate disturbing imagery such as blood, weapons, representations of suicide and a giant Kewpie doll that is often present in live performances as well. According to Matsunaga, the doll represents a baby created by modern society.

Red and white polka dots and sailor school uniforms are often used as an icon of Urbangarde. Matsunaga said, "There’s a “shoujo (girl)” religion unique to Japan which has the sailor uniform and straight black hair as its icons, and you can’t separate those from sexuality and gender. In Japan’s case, it’s not only the demand from the male side, but also the female side has the desire to be young and to remain as a girl." It is cited on their official website that the band represents the "minority of underground cultures, virgins and otakus". For these reasons, their success grew heavily on the internet.

Hamasaki and Matsunaga said in a PXLBBQ interview in France that Serge Gainsbourg is one of their influences. Technopop from the 1980s is also an inspiration for Matsunaga.

== History ==
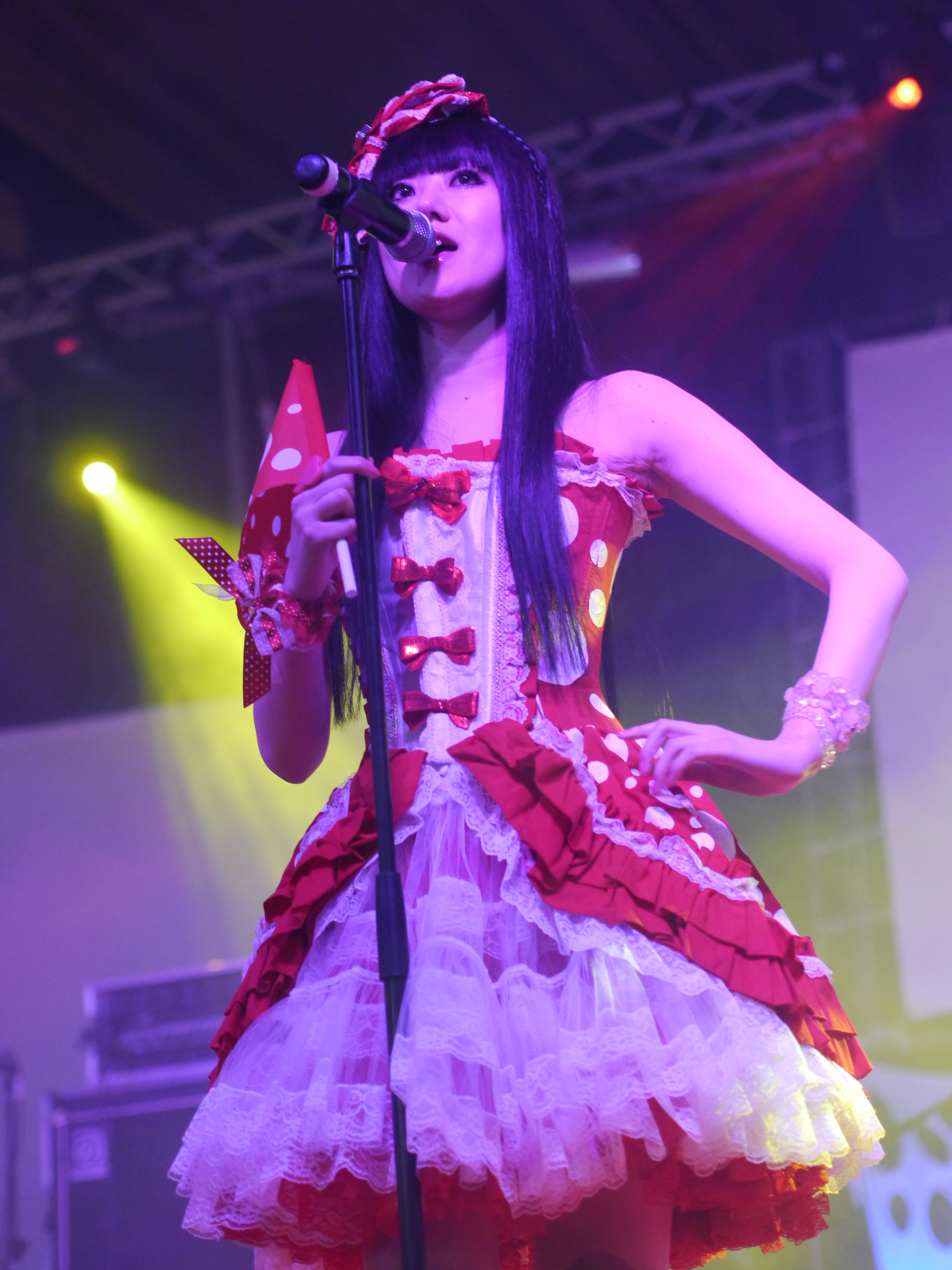
Yokotan from Urbangarde performing live at Toulouse Game Show in 2012

Urbangarde was created by lyricist, poet, and actor Temma Matsunaga after meeting Yoko Hamasaki, who then sang old French songs. After seeing one of her performances, Matsunaga recognized her talent and decided to make her the lead singer of the band. They started to significantly rise in popularity in 2007 after having passed the audition for Yahoo! Japan ・WHO’S NEXT and making it to the top 5 among over 3000 bands.

After the release of the first three indie albums, their major debut singles "Skirt Kakumei" and "Tokimeki ni Shisu" were released under Universal Music Japan in 2011. The following album Mental Hells was their first major label album release. They then started performing for crowds of over 1000 in Tokyo and their 2012 album Geiger Counter Culture reached position number 10 on the daily Oricon chart in Japan and made the top 25 on its weekly chart. The album was a reflection on the post-Fukushima era in Japan. In an interview by Daniel Robson from noisy.vice.com, Matsunaga said, "after the earthquake there has been a lot to get pissed off about in Japanese politics, and now we feel like we have a message to get across."

Urbangarde also participated in several seasons of the TV program Japan in Motion (NOLIFE TV), which eventually led them to perform live at the Toulouse Game Show in December 2012. Since then, the band has had an ever-growing fanbase in France. The band performed at Paris's anime convention Japan Expo in July 2013 and then released their greatest hits compilation Koi to Kakumei to URBANGARDE featuring their new opus "Tokai no Alice".

Urbangarde's album Utsukushii Kuni was released in June 2014. The title "Utsukushii Kuni" (Beautiful Country) is a play on words, as the band intentionally used the incorrect Chinese character 鬱 (utsu=depression) instead of 美しい(utsukushii=beautiful) for the album's name. The album features artwork by Makoto Aida, a contemporary Japanese painter renowned for his provocative works of manga, painting, video, photography and sculpture.

== Discography ==
=== Albums ===
- Loss Of Virginity Production
- Shōjo wa nidoshinu (少女は二度死ぬ) (April 2008)
- Shōjo Toshi Keikaku (少女都市計画) (October 9, 2009)
- Shōjo no shōmei (少女の証明) (October 8, 2010)
- Mental Hells (メンタルへルズ) (October 26, 2011)
- Geiger Counter Culture (ガイガーカウンターカルチャー) (October 24, 2012)
- Koi to Kakumei to URBANGARDE (BEST OF COMPILATION) (恋と革命とアーバンギャルド) (June 19, 2013)
- Utsukushii Kuni (鬱くしい国) (June 18, 2014)
- SHOUWA 90 NEN (昭和九十年) (December 9, 2015)
- Tokyopop (January 1, 2020)
- Avantdemic (November 25, 2020)

=== Singles ===
- "Revisionist" (修正主義者) (May 6, 2007)
- "Girls War" (傷だらけのマリア) (July 9, 2010)
- "Skirt Kakumei" (スカート革命) (July 20, 2011)
- "Tokimeki ni Shisu" (ときめきに死す) (September 28, 2011)
- "Umare te mi tai" (生まれてみたい) (March 7, 2012)
- "Yameru Idol" (病めるアイドル) (June 20, 2012)
- "Sayonara Sub Culture" (さよならサブカルチャー) (September 19, 2012)
