= Daniel Brat =

American neuropathologist

Daniel Jay Brat is an American neuropathologist and brain tumor investigator. He is the Magerstadt Professor and Chair of Pathology at Northwestern University Feinberg School of Medicine and Northwestern Memorial Healthcare.

== Education ==
Brat earned his medical degree from the Mayo Medical School and doctoral degree from the Mayo Graduate School in 1994. He subsequently completed his residency in anatomic pathology and a fellowship in neuropathology at Johns Hopkins Hospital.

== Career ==
In 1999, Brat joined the faculty of Pathology and Laboratory Medicine at Emory University. The next year, he became involved with the World Health Organization (WHO) Classification of Brain Tumors, and his research with the TCGA on diffuse gliomas has helped develop a new molecular classification that is used by the WHO and the subject of CAP guideline development. From 2009 until 2011, Brat served as vice-chair of the College of American Pathologists (CAP) Neuropathology Committee, before being elected chair from 2012 until 2015. While sitting as chair, Brat was elected to the American Society for Clinical Investigation.

In his final year as chair, Brat was appointed chair of the Pathology and Biospecimen Committee as he led a clinical trial that attempted to find effective responses to the brain tumour glioblastoma. By 2016, Brat was honoured with the CAP lifetime achievement award. He also co-authored "Practical Surgical Neuropathology: A Diagnostic Approach" with A. Perry in 2011.

Brat stayed at Emory for 17 years before accepting a position as Magerstadt Professor and Chair of Pathology at the Northwestern University Feinberg School of Medicine and Pathologist-in-Chief of Northwestern Memorial Hospital. In 2018, Brat and Eileen Bigio were elected president and vice president of the American Association of Neuropathologists.
