= Anime Los Angeles =

Anime convention in Los Angeles, California

- Status: Active
- Venue: Long Beach Convention and Entertainment Center
- Location: Long Beach, California
- Coordinates: 33°45′53″N 118°11′26″W
- Country: United States
- Inaugurated: 2005
- Attendance: 17,786 total in 2024
- Website: animelosangeles.org

Anime Los Angeles (stylized as Animé Los Angeles) is an annual four-day anime convention held during January at the Long Beach Convention and Entertainment Center in Long Beach, California.

== Programming ==
The convention typically offers an AMV contest, artists' alley, con suite, cosplay chess, dealers room, fashion show, formal dance, a gaming room, karaoke, maid café, manga lounge, and masquerade.

== History ==
The convention moved from the Los Angeles Airport Marriott to the Ontario Convention Center in 2016. This move was made to accommodate the convention's growth. Anime Los Angeles 2021 was cancelled due to the COVID-19 pandemic. In 2022, the convention moved to the Long Beach Convention and Entertainment Center. Anime Los Angeles 2025 occurred as scheduled despite the Los Angeles wildfires.

=== Event history ===
Dates	Location	Atten.	Guests
January 28-30, 2005	Airtel Plaza Hotel; Van Nuys, California	616	Caroline "Carmen" Curtis, Jerry Koudelik, and Tadao Tomomatsu.
January 27-29, 2006	Airtel Plaza Hotel; Van Nuys, California	1,346	Phuong-Mai Blasich (PMBQ), Hiroaki Inoue, Karisu-sama, Richard Man, and Tadao Tomomatsu.
January 26-28, 2007	Airtel Plaza Hotel; Van Nuys, California	1,875	Svetlana Chmakova, J Dee DuPuy, and Tadao Tomomatsu.
January 4-6, 2008	Burbank Airport Marriott Hotel & Convention Center; Burbank, California	2,509	Darrel Guilbeau, Vic Mignogna, Tadao Tomomatsu, and Bryan Wong.
January 2-4, 2009	Los Angeles Airport Marriott; Los Angeles, California	2,851	Zac Bertschy, Johnny Yong Bosch, Darrel Guilbeau, Kevin Lillard, Scott Ramsoomair, Tadao Tomomatsu, and Cristina Vee.
January 8-10, 2010	Los Angeles Airport Marriott; Los Angeles, California	3,207	Bekka the Alice, Jessica Gaona, Kyle Hebert, The Spoony Bards, and Tadao Tomomatsu.
January 29-30, 2011	Los Angeles Airport Marriott; Los Angeles, California	3,598	Gina Biggs, Taliesin Jaffe, Helen McCarthy, Jason Charles Miller, Patrick Seitz, and Tadao Tomomatsu.
January 6-8, 2012	Los Angeles Airport Marriott; Los Angeles, California	4,211	Jon Allen, Mark Allen, Jr., Chris Cason, Julie Rei Goldstein, Kyle Hebert, Lauren Landa, Danielle McRae, Dave Merrill, Craig Miller, Panda Cubed, Steve Prince, Stan Sakai, Jessica Straus, Kaiji Tang, Jonathan Tarbox, Tadao Tomomatsu, and Stephen Weese.
January 4-6, 2013	Los Angeles Airport Marriott; Los Angeles, California	5,001	Zac Bertschy, Johnny Yong Bosch, Edward Bosco, Kira Buckland, Eunyoung Choi, Meri Davis, Lucien Dodge, Tim Eldred, Richard Epcar, M. Alice LeGrow, Mary Elizabeth McGlynn, Danielle McRae, Panda Cubed, Laura Post, David Keith Riddick, Matt Schley, Patrick Seitz, Justin Sevakis, Kaiji Tang, Tadao Tomomatsu, Kimlinh Tran, Stephen Weese, Ezra Weisz, Sarah Anne Williams, and Masaaki Yuasa.
January 10-12, 2014	Los Angeles Airport Marriott; Los Angeles, California	4,583	Edward Bosco, Kira Buckland, Lucien Dodge, Erin Fitzgerald, Kyle Hebert, Natalie Rose Hoover , Rai Kamishiro, Lolita Dark, Danielle McRae, Neil Nadelman, Panda Cubed, Parlé Productions, Laura Post, David Keith Riddick, Patrick Seitz, Christopher Corey Smith, Aimee Major Steinberger, Kaiji Tang, Jonathan Tarbox, Tadao Tomomatsu, Kimlinh Tran, Ezra Weisz, Lisle Wilkerson, and Sarah Anne Williams.
January 9-11, 2015	Los Angeles Airport Marriott; Los Angeles, California	4,702	Edward Bosco, Kira Buckland, Christine Marie Cabanos, Jacob Grady, Natalie Rose Hoover, Carl Gustav Horn, Taliesin Jaffe, Carrie Keranen, Erik Scott Kimerer, Danielle McRae, Erica Mendez, Matthew Mercer, Marin M. Miller, Panda Cubed, Laura Post, Kaiji Tang, Jonathan Tarbox, Tadao Tomomatsu, David Vincent, Ezra Weisz, and Sarah Anne Williams.
January 29-31, 2016	Ontario Convention Center; Ontario, California	8,098	Edward Bosco, Chocolate Covered Cosplay, Les E. Claypool III, Lucien Dodge, Victor Frost, Caitlin Glass, Todd Haberkorn, Kyle Hebert, Erica Lindbeck, Lionel Lum, Danielle McRae, Erica Mendez, Cassandra Lee Morris, Panda Cubed, David Keith Riddick, Stephanie Sheh, Tadao Tomomatsu, Ezra Weisz, Lisle Wilkerson, and Sarah Anne Williams.
January 27-29, 2017	Ontario Convention Center; Ontario, California	8,954	Brian Beacock, Pierre Bernard Jr., Edward Bosco, Jeff Burns, Chocolate Covered Cosplay, Mary Claypool, Les E. Claypool III, Richard Epcar, Victor Frost, Darrel Guilbeau, Hiroaki Inoue, Lauren Landa, Mela Lee, Erica Lindbeck, Jason Charles Miller, Sean O'Mara, Cindy Robinson, Tara Sands, Christopher Corey Smith, Ellyn Stern, Cristina Vee, Stephen Weese, Ezra Weisz, and Jason Wishnov.
January 25-28, 2018	Ontario Convention Center; Ontario, California	11,360	Pierre Bernard Jr., Beau Billingslea, Steve Blum, Zach Callison, Chocolate Covered Cosplay, Mary Claypool, Les E. Claypool III, Fon Davis, Dustbunny, Melissa Fahn, Victor Frost, Bonnie Gordon, Jacob Grady, Marc Handler, Grant Imahara, Xander Jeanneret, Karisu-sama, Wendee Lee, Lolita Dark, Mary Elizabeth McGlynn, Danielle McRae, Midnight Shinigami, Jeff Nimoy, Steve Prince, Raj Ramayya, Lia Sargent, Paul St. Peter, Skip Stellrecht, Ezra Weisz, and Stephanie Yanez.
January 10-13, 2019	Ontario Convention Center; Ontario, California	11,760	Pierre Bernard Jr., Morgan Berry, Justin Briner, Leo Camacho, Clifford Chapin, Chocolate Covered Cosplay, Mary Claypool, Les E. Claypool III, Colleen Clinkenbeard, Fon Davis, Dorothy Fahn, Melissa Fahn, Bryan Forrest, Victor Frost, Todd Haberkorn, Roland Kelts, David Matranga, Kyle McCarley, Kristen McGuire, Joe Ochman, Skip Stellrecht, Chris Tergliafera, Eric Vale, Christopher Wehkamp, and Ezra Weisz.
January 9-12, 2020	Ontario Convention Center; DoubleTree by Hilton Hotel Ontario Airport; Ontario, California	12,961	Steve Bennett, Pierre Bernard Jr., Mary Claypool, Les E. Claypool III, Zack Davisson, FEMM, Dorah Fine, Lauren Landa, Jason Charles Miller, Hiroshi Nagahama, Tony Oliver, Kaho Shibuya, Evil Ted Smith, Skip Stellrecht, Chris Tergliafera, Ezra Weisz, and Robert Woodhead.
January 6-9, 2022	Long Beach Convention and Entertainment Center; Long Beach, California	13,828	Pierre Bernard Jr., Kira Buckland, Mary Claypool, Les E. Claypool III, Cosplay Deviants, Richard Epcar, Victor Frost, Kazha, Jason Charles Miller, Casey Mongillo, Steve Prince, Adin Rudd, Kaho Shibuya, Evil Ted Smith, Ellyn Stern, Chris Tergliafera, and Ezra Weisz.
January 5-8, 2023	Long Beach Convention and Entertainment Center; Long Beach, California	16,663	Corina Boettger, Mary Claypool, Les E. Claypool III, Dorothy Fahn, Tom Fahn, Adam McArthur, Kayleigh McKee, Kayli Mills, Pros and Cons Cosplay, Molly Searcy, Kaho Shibuya, Evil Ted Smith, Kaiji Tang, Chris Tergliafera, Steff Von Schweetz, Ezra Weisz, Anne Yatco, and Mamoru Yokota.
January 4-7, 2024	Long Beach Convention and Entertainment Center; Long Beach, California	17,786	Mark Allen, Jr., Edward Bosco, Cowbutt Crunchies, Zack Davisson, Lizzie Freeman, Victor Frost, Caitlin Glass, Amber May, Kayleigh McKee, Chris Niosi, Tara Sands, Kaho Shibuya, Evil Ted Smith, Sana Takizawa, Hidetaka Tenjin, Chris Tergliafera, Kari Wahlgren, and Ezra Weisz.
January 9-12, 2025	Long Beach Convention and Entertainment Center; Long Beach, California		Aicosu, Shinji Aramaki, Athel Artistry, Zack Davisson, Richard Epcar, Dorothy Fahn, Tom Fahn, Fake Type., Rebecca Forstadt, Lizzie Freeman, Victor Frost, Barbara Goodson, Melora Harte, Xanthe Huynh, Steve Kramer, Wendee Lee, James Luceno, Melanie MacQueen, Kerrigan Mahan, Cassandra Lee Morris, Shihori Nakane, Jonah Scott, Kaho Shibuya, Evil Ted Smith, Sarah Spaceman, Paul St. Peter, Ellyn Stern, Chris Tergliafera, Kiba Walker, Shinichiro Watanabe, Ezra Weisz, and Suzie Yeung.
January 8-11, 2026	Long Beach Convention and Entertainment Center; Long Beach, California		Andrew J. Alandy, Ben Balmaceda, Kelly Baskin, Dawn M. Bennett, Paul Castro Jr., Mary Claypool, Les E. Claypool III, Khoi Dao, Zack Davisson, Ben Diskin, Yaya Han, Chad Hoku, Carl Gustav Horn, Kirilee, Brianna Knickerbocker, Tsukasa Kotobuki, Wendee Lee, Courtney Lin, Emi Lo, Hiroshi Nagahama, Cat Protano, Katiana Sarkissian, Justice Slocum, Evil Ted Smith, Laura Stahl, Chris Tergliafera, Utahime, Ezra Weisz, and Mamoru Yokota.
January 7-10, 2027	Long Beach Convention and Entertainment Center; Long Beach, California		Andrew J. Alandy, Victor Frost, Utahime, and Ezra Weisz.
