= Cleveland Review of Books =

American magazine of literary reviews

- Fall/Winter 2022 issue cover
- Editor-in-chief: Brianna Di Monda
- Categories: Literature; culture; current affairs
- Frequency: biannual
- Publisher: Billy Lennon; Robert Gittings
- Total circulation: 500 (2022)
- First issue: 2018
- Country: United States
- Based in: Cleveland, Ohio
- Language: English
- Website: clereviewofbooks.com

The Cleveland Review of Books is an annual, Ohio-based little magazine of literary & art criticism, essays, fiction, and poetry. It is published both in print and online.

The magazine was founded in 2018 by writers Billy Lennon and Robert Gittings, whose stated aim was to "fill a perceived gap in regional criticism," and to showcase midwestern authors. Lennon cited Brooklyn's n+1 magazine and the Los Angeles Review of Books as inspirations.

The magazine features reviews of fiction and non-fiction books, and its editors often curate yearly best-of lists. It is published once every year out of Hunting Valley, Ohio. The first print issue was published in 2022.

== See also ==
- New York Review of Books
- London Review of Books
- Chicago Review of Books
