= Shō Kiryūin =

Japanese singer and songwriter

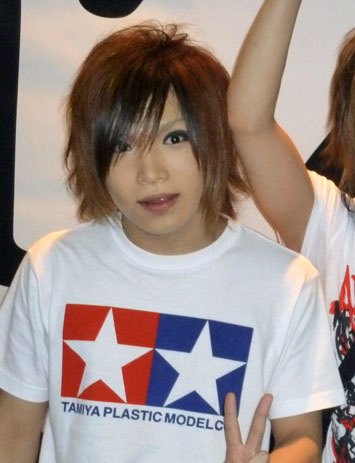
- Kiryuin at the Japan Expo in 2011
- Born: June 20, 1984 (age 41); Tokyo, Japan
- Occupations: Singer; songwriter
- Years active: 2004–present
- Spouse: Unknown (m. 2021; div. 2025)
- Children: 1
- Musical career
- Genres: J-pop; pop punk; comedy rock
- Instruments: Vocals; drums; bass; guitar; violin; piano
- Label: Euclid/Zany Zap (2008-present)

Shō Kiryūin (鬼龍院翔, Kiryūin Shō; born June 20, 1984) is a Japanese singer and songwriter. He is the lead singer of the Japanese "visual kei air band" Golden Bomber. He also writes, composes and co-arranges all the songs for the band. He plays multiple instruments including guitar, bass guitar and drums, and dabbles in piano and violin. He is the voice provider for the VoiSona vocal synthesizer, KIRUNE.

== Early life ==
Shō Kiryūin was born on 20 June 1984 in Tokyo, Japan. He attended Tokyo Metropolitan Mukogaoka High School, where he participated in the Light Music club.

== Career ==
=== Golden Bomber ===
He formed the band Golden Bomber with guitarist Yutaka Kyan. Initially the members played live instruments, but due to Yutaka Kyan's lack of musical ability, they decided to switch to play their music from an iPod and restyle themselves as an "air band". He writes songs and lyrics by himself. However, he went to the recording studio with other members of Golden Bomber, Kiryūin plays instruments including violin. He touring live with Oneman Kowai, and Zenryoku Baka tours along with other members of Golden Bomber. In 2008 He and other members of Golden Bomber signed with Euclid/Zany Zap records, but signed with Atlantic Records. Kiryūin and members of Golden Bomber performed for 2 days at the Yokohama Arena, He performed in Nippon Budokan, and on 21 January, Kiryūin and members of Golden Bomber performed in Osaka-jō Hall, but in 2010, the Expo 2010 concert in Shanghai was cancelled.

=== Parodies ===
Kiryūin makes many parody songs of songs by famous singers and bands, imitating their melody, lyrics, singing style. For example, "Ultra Phantom" is Koshi Inaba, "Tsunami no Johnny" - Keisuke Kuwata imitation.

== Other ventures ==
On June 20, 2012, Kiryūin released his autobiography "I’m Golden Bomber’s vocalist, are there any questions?". He made his solo debut with the opening theme "Life is SHOW TIME" from Kamen Rider Wizard.

== Radio hosting ==
Kiryuin hosted the All Night Nippon radio program, from January 5, 2011 to June 29, 2015.

== SASUKE ==
He joined SASUKE 40 at 27 December 2022. He was given #3959. He failed Stage 1 at Rolling Hill .

== Personal life ==
Kiryūin lists his hobbies and interests as meat, bread, alcohol, ramen, manga, adult videos, detective games, and 1990s J-pop. Since middle school, he has been a big fan of Gackt and Malice Mizer.

On September 4, 2021, Kiryuin announced on both Twitter and his personal Ameba blog that he had gotten married. Due to his wife's uninvolvement with the entertainment industry, he asked that fans respect her privacy and not harass either party's extended families. On August 12, 2024, He announced through his official social media account that he and his wife had welcomed the birth of their first child, Kiryūin did not disclose the gender of their baby in consideration to the future.
