= Just Dance Wii U =

2014 video game

- Japanese box art
- Developer: Ubisoft (Note: Collaboration between Ubisoft Paris, Ubisoft Reflections, Ubisoft Montpellier, Ubisoft Bucharest, Ubisoft Milan and Ubisoft Pune.)
- Publisher: Nintendo
- Producer: Ubisoft
- Series: Just Dance
- Engine: UbiArt Framework
- Platform: Wii U
- Release: JP: 3 April 2014
- Genres: Music, rhythm
- Modes: Single-player, multiplayer

Just Dance Wii U (Note: Known in Japan as JUST DANCE(ジャストダンス) Wii U) is a 2014 dance rhythm game developed by Ubisoft, and published by Nintendo for the Wii U. The third Japanese installment in the Just Dance series published by Ubisoft, it was revealed in a Nintendo Direct on 14 February 2014 and released on 3 April 2014 exclusively in Japan.

== Gameplay ==
As in previous installments, players must mimic the routine of an on-screen dancer to a chosen song, scoring points based on their accuracy. The game requires Wii Remotes to dance.

The game is based on Just Dance 2014, with the user interface and features are largely identical to that said game, but it removes online multiplayer functionality ("World Dance Floor") and a few other features present in that game. However, the credits for that said game is also shown alongside the credits for this game. Just like in Just Dance 2014, the Gamepad can be used to record "Autodance" videos (the effects can't be applied, however) via the camera to display lyrics on the Gamepad, in which the microphone is used to earn Mojo points.

== Soundtrack ==
There are a total of 35 songs in the soundtrack, including twenty Japanese songs.

Song	Artist	Year
"Acerola Taisō no Uta"	Humbert Humbert	2010
"Applause" (Note: Previously featured on Just Dance 2014)	Lady Gaga	2013
"Can't Take My Eyes Off You" (Note: Previously featured on Just Dance 4)	Boys Town Gang	1982
"Careless Whisper"	George Michael	1984
"Dance de Bakōn!"	C-ute	2010
"Dance My Generation"	Golden Bomber	2013
"Electric Boy"	Kara	2012
"EZ Do Dance" (Note: Also featured as a Just Dance Unlimited exclusive in the Japanese version of Just Dance 2020)	TRF	1993
"Fantastic Baby (Japanese Version)"	Big Bang	2012
"Flying Get"	AKB48	2011
"Follow Me"	E-girls	2012
"Gakuen Tengoku"	Dream5	2012
"Gangnam Style" (Note: Previously featured as a downloadable track on Just Dance 4)	PSY	2012
"Gentleman"	PSY	2013
"Gimme! Gimme! Gimme! (A Man After Midnight)"	ABBA	1979
"I Will Survive"	Gloria Gaynor	1978
"I Wish For You"	Exile	2010
"Ikuze! Kaitō Shōjo"	Momoiro Clover Z	2010
"Just Dance"	Lady Gaga featuring Colby O'Donis	2008
"Kiss Datte Hidarikiki"	SKE48	2012
"Koi Suru Fortune Cookie"	AKB48	2013
"Livin' la Vida Loca"	Ricky Martin	1999
"Love Machine"	Morning Musume	1999
"Memeshikute"	Golden Bomber	2009
"Mite Mite☆Kotchitchi"	Momoiro Clover Z	2010
"Moves Like Jagger"	Maroon 5 featuring Christina Aguilera	2011
"Ninja Re Bang Bang"	Kyary Pamyu Pamyu	2013
"Part of Me"	Katy Perry	2012
"Sansei Kawaii!"	SKE48	2013
"Sexy and I Know It" (Note: Previously featured as a downloadable track on Just Dance 2014)	LMFAO	2011
"Superstition"	Stevie Wonder	1972
"Tell Your World"	Livetune featuring Hatsune Miku	2012
"The Final Countdown"	Europe	1986
"Tsukematsukeru"	Kyary Pamyu Pamyu	2011
"What Makes You Beautiful"	One Direction	2011

== Reception ==
Reception

Review score
Publication	Score
Famitsu	32/40

Famitsu gave the game a score of 32/40, with each reviewer giving it an 8.
