= Shareotsu/Hello =

Single by SMAP
- Released: December 18, 2013 (Japan)

SMAP singles chronology
"Joy!!" (2013)	"Shareotsu/Hello" (2013)	"Yes we are/ココカラ" (2014)

"Shareotsu/Hello" (シャレオツ/ハロー) is a single by Japanese boy band SMAP. It was released on December 18, 2013. It debuted in number one on the weekly Oricon Singles Chart and reached number one on the Billboard Japan Hot 100. It was the 25th best-selling single of 2014 in Japan, with 250,616 copies.
