= Dive into the Mirror =

- Two-disk (CD & DVD) version cover

Single by Defspiral
- Released: May 26, 2010
- Genre: Hard rock
- Label: Avex Mode
- Composer(s): Ryo
- Lyricist(s): Taka

Defspiral singles chronology
"Leave all Behind" (2010)	"Dive into the Mirror" (2010)	"Twilight" (2010)

"Dive into the Mirror" is the first single by Japanese rock group Defspiral after Wilma-Sidr line-up reunited under their new name. The song is the group's second release under Avex Group's Avex Mode label and it was used as the opening song of the Japanese dub of Kamen Rider: Dragon Knight. The single charted at number 77 on the Oricon Weekly Charts, remaining on the charts for two weeks, and debuted at number 89 on the Billboard Japan Hot Single Sales charts for the week of June 7, 2010.

== Track list ==
All lyrics are written by Taka

CD
No.	Title	Length
1.	"Dive into the Mirror"	4:23
2.	"Innocent"	4:26
3.	"Dive into the Mirror (Instrumental)"	4:23
4.	"Innocent (Instrumental)"	4:23

DVD
No.	Title	Length
1.	"Dive into the Mirror"
