= Kamen Rider Wizard =

- Genre: Tokusatsu; Superhero fiction Fantasy action Supernatural; Horror
- Created by: Shotaro Ishinomori
- Written by: Tsuyoshi Kida; Junko Kōmura
- Directed by: Shojiro Nakazawa
- Starring: Shunya Shiraishi; Makoto Okunaka; Junki Tozuka; Yuko Takayama; Tasuku Nagase; Hisahiro Ogura; Erina Nakayama; Atsumi; Takahisa Maeyama; Kaba-chan; Ryo Tayano; Naoki Kawano; Narushi Ikeda
- Voices of: Ryūzaburō Ōtomo; Tomomichi Nishimura
- Narrated by: Hiroaki Hirata
- Opening theme: "Life is SHOW TIME" by Shō Kiryūin from Golden Bomber
- Composer: Kōtarō Nakagawa
- Country of origin: Japan
- Original language: Japanese
- No. of episodes: 53 (list of episodes)

Production
- Producers: Kengo Motoi (TV Asahi); Motoi Sasaki (TV Asahi); Takaaki Utsunomiya (Toei)
- Running time: 20–25 minutes
- Production companies: Toei Company; Ishimori Productions; TV Asahi Corporation; Asatsu-DK

Original release
- Network: ANN (TV Asahi)
- Release: September 2, 2012 – September 29, 2013

Related
- Kamen Rider Fourze; Kamen Rider Gaim

Kamen Rider Wizard (仮面ライダーウィザード, Kamen Raidā Uizādo) is a Japanese tokusatsu drama in Toei Company's Kamen Rider franchise, being the 14th series in the Heisei period run and the 23rd overall. It began airing on TV Asahi on September 2, 2012, joining Tokumei Sentai Go-Busters and then Zyuden Sentai Kyoryuger in the Super Hero Time lineup. Tsuyoshi Kida is the series' main screenwriter. The series revolves around magic, rings, and gemstones. The series centers on Haruto Soma, who transforms into Kamen Rider Wizard to fight against monsters called Phantoms, created from human despair.

== Story ==
Six months before the start of the series, a mysterious ritual held on the day of the solar eclipse took place. Its purpose was to give birth to a group of magical creatures called Phantoms through humans with magical potential called "Gates", by forcibly subjecting them to immense despair. Haruto Soma, the survivor of the ritual, and Koyomi, a mysterious girl who has lost all of her memories, are tasked by the mysterious White Wizard to fight the Phantoms. Haruto is also given the WizarDriver to become Kamen Rider Wizard to prevent the Phantoms from transforming other Gates into Phantoms themselves. Later on, a man named Kosuke Nito appears as the ancient wizard Kamen Rider Beast to feed on the Phantom's magical power to survive, and becomes both a rival and ally to Haruto. As the two wizards wage their battle against the Phantoms, who are led by the hotheaded Phoenix, the cold and merciless Medusa, the scheming Gremlin, and the enigmatic Wiseman, things are not all as they seem.

== Episodes ==
No.	Title	Directed by	Written by	Original release date
1	"The Ringed Wizard"; Transliteration: "Yubiwa no Mahōtsukai" (Japanese: 指輪の魔法使い)	Shojiro Nakazawa	Tsuyoshi Kida	September 2, 2012
2	"I Want to Be a Wizard"; Transliteration: "Mahōtsukai ni Naritai" (Japanese: 魔法使いになりたい)	Shojiro Nakazawa	Junko Kōmura; Tsuyoshi Kida	September 9, 2012
3	"Transform! Live Broadcast"; Transliteration: "Henshin! Namachūkei" (Japanese: 変身！生中継)	Shojiro Nakazawa	Junko Kōmura; Tsuyoshi Kida	September 16, 2012
4	"The Doll and the Pianist"; Transliteration: "Ningyō to Pianisuto" (Japanese: 人形とピアニスト)	Satoshi Morota	Tsuyoshi Kida	September 23, 2012
5	"The Deciding Match of the Contest"; Transliteration: "Kessen no Konkūru" (Japanese: 決戦のコンクール)	Satoshi Morota	Tsuyoshi Kida	September 30, 2012
6	"To a Beautiful Flower"; Transliteration: "Kirei na Hana ni wa" (Japanese: キレイな花には)	Kenzo Maihara	Junko Kōmura	October 7, 2012
7	"Buying Memories"; Transliteration: "Omoide o Kau Tame ni" (Japanese: 思い出を買うために)	Kenzo Maihara	Junko Kōmura	October 14, 2012
8	"A New Magic Stone"; Transliteration: "Aratana Mahōseki" (Japanese: 新たな魔宝石)	Shojiro Nakazawa	Junko Kōmura	October 21, 2012
9	"The Dragon's Cry"; Transliteration: "Doragon no Sakebi" (Japanese: ドラゴンの叫び)	Shojiro Nakazawa	Junko Kōmura	October 28, 2012
10	"National Security Bureau Section 0"; Transliteration: "Kokka Anzenkyoku Zero-ka" (Japanese: 国家安全局0課)	Satoshi Morota	Tsuyoshi Kida	November 11, 2012
11	"The Promise to Defend"; Transliteration: "Mamorinuku Yakusoku" (Japanese: 守り抜く約束)	Satoshi Morota	Tsuyoshi Kida	November 18, 2012
12	"The Wagashi of Hope"; Transliteration: "Kibō no Wagashi" (Japanese: 希望の和菓子)	Ryuta Tasaki	Junko Kōmura	November 25, 2012
13	"The Heir to the Dream"; Transliteration: "Yume o Tsugu Mono" (Japanese: 夢を継ぐ者)	Ryuta Tasaki	Junko Kōmura	December 2, 2012
14	"The Return of the Film Director"; Transliteration: "Kaettekita Eiga Kantoku" (Japanese: 帰って来た映画監督)	Kenzo Maihara	Junko Kōmura	December 9, 2012
15	"After the Last Scene Is..."; Transliteration: "Rasuto Shīn no Ato wa" (Japanese: ラストシーンの後は)	Kenzo Maihara	Junko Kōmura	December 16, 2012
16	"The Christmas Miracle"; Transliteration: "Kurisumasu no Kiseki" (Japanese: クリスマスの奇跡)	Shojiro Nakazawa	Tsuyoshi Kida	December 23, 2012
17	"Another Wizard"; Transliteration: "Mō Hitori no Mahōtsukai" (Japanese: もう一人の魔法使い)	Shojiro Nakazawa	Tsuyoshi Kida	January 6, 2013
18	"Magical Power Eating"; Transliteration: "Maryoku ga Shokuji" (Japanese: 魔力が食事)	Satoshi Morota	Tsuyoshi Kida	January 13, 2013
19	"Today's Life, Tomorrow's Life"; Transliteration: "Kyō no Inochi, Ashita no Inochi" (Japanese: 今日の命、明日の命)	Satoshi Morota	Tsuyoshi Kida	January 20, 2013
20	"Learning the Truth"; Transliteration: "Chikazuku Shinshō" (Japanese: 近づく真相)	Hidenori Ishida	Junko Kōmura	January 27, 2013
21	"The Crazed Dance of the Dragons"; Transliteration: "Doragon-tachi no Ranbu" (Japanese: ドラゴンたちの乱舞)	Hidenori Ishida	Junko Kōmura	February 3, 2013
22	"The Phoenix's Rampage"; Transliteration: "Fushichō no Bōsō" (Japanese: 不死鳥の暴走)	Shojiro Nakazawa	Tsuyoshi Kida	February 10, 2013
23	"Deathmatch"; Transliteration: "Kessen" (Japanese: 決戦)	Shojiro Nakazawa	Tsuyoshi Kida	February 17, 2013
24	"The Wizard's Grandmother"; Transliteration: "Mahōtsukai no Sobo" (Japanese: 魔法使いの祖母)	Kenzo Maihara	Junko Kōmura	February 24, 2013
25	"Life Choices"; Transliteration: "Inochi no Sentaku" (Japanese: 命の選択)	Kenzo Maihara	Junko Kōmura	March 3, 2013
26	"Campus Infiltration"; Transliteration: "Gakuen Sen'nyū" (Japanese: 学園潜入)	Satoshi Morota	Tsuyoshi Kida	March 10, 2013
27	"Big and Little Sisters"; Transliteration: "Ane to Imōto" (Japanese: 姉と妹)	Satoshi Morota	Tsuyoshi Kida	March 17, 2013
28	"The Stolen Belt"; Transliteration: "Nusumareta Beruto" (Japanese: 盗まれたベルト)	Shojiro Nakazawa	Junko Kōmura	March 24, 2013
29	"The Evolving Wild Beast"; Transliteration: "Shinka Suru Yajū" (Japanese: 進化する野獣)	Shojiro Nakazawa	Junko Kōmura	March 31, 2013
30	"The Day Magic Disappeared"; Transliteration: "Mahō no Kieru Hi" (Japanese: 魔法の消える日)	Takayuki Shibasaki	Tsuyoshi Kida	April 7, 2013
31	"Tears"; Transliteration: "Namida" (Japanese: 涙)	Takayuki Shibasaki	Tsuyoshi Kida	April 14, 2013
32	"Part-Time Danger"; Transliteration: "Kiken na Arubaito" (Japanese: 危険なアルバイト)	Hidenori Ishida	Daisuke Ishibashi	April 21, 2013
33	"What Money Can't Buy"; Transliteration: "Kane de Kaenai Mono" (Japanese: 金で買えないモノ)	Hidenori Ishida	Daisuke Ishibashi	April 28, 2013
34	"The Other Side of a Popular Model"; Transliteration: "Ninki Moderu no Uragawa" (Japanese: 人気モデルの裏側)	Kenzo Maihara	Tsuyoshi Kida	May 5, 2013
35	"The Other Side of Sora"; Transliteration: "Sora no Mukōgawa" (Japanese: 空の向こう側)	Kenzo Maihara	Tsuyoshi Kida	May 12, 2013
36	"The Myna Bird Speaks"; Transliteration: "Kyūkanchō wa Kataru" (Japanese: 九官鳥は語る)	Satoshi Morota	Daisuke Ishibashi	May 19, 2013
37	"Wanted: Despair"; Transliteration: "Zetsubō, Shimei Tehai" (Japanese: 絶望、指名手配)	Satoshi Morota	Daisuke Ishibashi	May 26, 2013
38	"Stolen Hope"; Transliteration: "Ubatta Kibō" (Japanese: 奪った希望)	Hidenori Ishida	Tsuyoshi Kida	June 2, 2013
39	"What Was Forgotten on the Pitch"; Transliteration: "Pitchi no Wasuremono" (Japanese: ピッチの忘れ物)	Hidenori Ishida	Tsuyoshi Kida	June 9, 2013
40	"I Want to Ride a Bike"; Transliteration: "Jitensha ni Noritai" (Japanese: 自転車に乗りたい)	Kenzo Maihara	Junko Kōmura	June 23, 2013
41	"The Wizard Fate"; Transliteration: "Mahōtsukai wa Unmei" (Japanese: 魔法使いは運命)	Kenzo Maihara	Junko Kōmura	June 30, 2013
42	"The Ringed Novelist"; Transliteration: "Yubiwa no Shōsetsuka" (Japanese: 指輪の小説家)	Satoshi Morota	Tsuyoshi Kida	July 7, 2013
43	"The White Wizard's Secret"; Transliteration: "Shiroi Mahōtsukai no Himitsu" (Japanese: 白い魔法使いの秘密)	Satoshi Morota	Tsuyoshi Kida	July 14, 2013
44	"The Son's Keepsake"; Transliteration: "Musuko no Katami wa" (Japanese: 息子の形見は)	Hidenori Ishida	Junko Kōmura	July 21, 2013
45	"The Smile in My Heart"; Transliteration: "Egao wa Mune ni" (Japanese: 笑顔は胸に)	Hidenori Ishida	Junko Kōmura	July 28, 2013
46	"The Cracked Feelings"; Transliteration: "Hibiwareta Omoi" (Japanese: ひび割れた思い)	Kenzo Maihara	Junko Kōmura	August 4, 2013
47	"The Truth About Wiseman"; Transliteration: "Waizuman no Shinjitsu" (Japanese: ワイズマンの真実)	Kenzo Maihara	Junko Kōmura	August 11, 2013
48	"The Philosopher's Stone"; Transliteration: "Kenja no Ishi" (Japanese: 賢者の石)	Satoshi Morota	Tsuyoshi Kida	August 18, 2013
49	"The Beginning of the Sabbath"; Transliteration: "Sabato no Makuake" (Japanese: サバトの幕開け)	Satoshi Morota	Tsuyoshi Kida	September 1, 2013
50	"What Is Important?"; Transliteration: "Taisetsu na Mono wa" (Japanese: 大切なものは)	Shojiro Nakazawa	Tsuyoshi Kida	September 8, 2013
51	"The Last Hope"; Transliteration: "Saigo no Kibō" (Japanese: 最後の希望)	Shojiro Nakazawa	Tsuyoshi Kida	September 15, 2013
52	"The Kamen Rider Rings"; Transliteration: "Kamen Raidā no Yubiwa" (Japanese: 仮面ライダーの指輪)	Hidenori Ishida	Shō Aikawa	September 22, 2013
53	"The Endless Story"; Transliteration: "Owaranai Monogatari" (Japanese: 終わらない物語)	Hidenori Ishida	Shō Aikawa	September 29, 2013

== Films ==
Kamen Rider Wizard made his first appearance as a cameo in the film Kamen Rider Fourze the Movie: Space, Here We Come!.

=== Movie War Ultimatum ===
Kamen Rider × Kamen Rider Wizard & Fourze: Movie War Ultimatum (仮面ライダー×仮面ライダー ウィザード&フォーゼ MOVIE大戦アルティメイタム, Kamen Raidā × Kamen Raidā Wizādo Ando Fōze Mūbī Taisen Arutimeitamu) was released on December 8, 2012, and served as the annual winter "Movie War" film. In the portion featuring the cast and characters of Kamen Rider Wizard, the title character from Shotaro Ishinomori's La Belle Fille Masquée Poitrine appears. The title team of Shotaro Ishinomori's Akumaizer 3 also appears in the movie as its main antagonists, with Demon Kakka providing the voice of Xatan as well as the performer for its theme song "Forest of Rocks". Kamen Riders OOO, Birth, Double, and Accel also made appearances in the movie. The event of the movie took place between Episode 13 and 14.

=== Super Hero Taisen Z ===
Kamen Rider × Super Sentai × Space Sheriff: Super Hero Taisen Z (仮面ライダー×スーパー戦隊×宇宙刑事 スーパーヒーロー大戦Z, Kamen Raidā × Sūpā Sentai × Uchū Keiji Supā Hīrō Taisen Zetto) is a film that was released in Japan on April 27, 2013, which featured the first crossover between characters of Toei's three main Tokusatsu franchises, Kamen Rider, Super Sentai, and the Space Sheriff Series representing the Metal Hero Series as a whole. The protagonists of Space Sheriff Gavan: The Movie, Tokumei Sentai Go-Busters, and Kaizoku Sentai Gokaiger are featured, but the casts of Kamen Rider Wizard, Zyuden Sentai Kyoryuger, and Kamen Rider Fourze also participate in the film. The Space Ironmen Kyodain from Kamen Rider Fourze the Movie: Space, Here We Come! also made an appearance. The teaser for the film was shown after Kamen Rider × Kamen Rider Wizard & Fourze: Movie War Ultimatum. The event of the movie took place between Episode 27 and 28.

=== In Magic Land ===
As with every year, Kamen Rider Wizard appears in his own film titled Kamen Rider Wizard in Magic Land the Movie (劇場版 仮面ライダーウィザード in Magic Land, Gekijōban Kamen Raidā Wizādo In Majikku Rando) that was released in theaters on August 3, 2013, double-billed with Zyuden Sentai Kyoryuger: Gaburincho of Music. The film features Takanori Jinnai as the film's villain Minister Auma who transforms into Kamen Rider Sorcerer. Jinnai is the oldest person to portray a Kamen Rider to date at age 54; the record was previously held by Hiroyuki Watanabe for his portrayal of Kamen Rider Gaoh in Kamen Rider Den-O: I'm Born! who at the time of filming was 51. The event of the movie took place between Episode 39 and 40.

=== The Fateful Sengoku Movie Battle ===
Kamen Rider × Kamen Rider Gaim & Wizard: The Fateful Sengoku Movie Battle (仮面ライダー×仮面ライダー 鎧武&ウィザード 天下分け目の戦国MOVIE大合戦, Kamen Raidā × Kamen Raidā Gaimu Ando Wizādo Tenkawakeme no Sengoku Mūbī Daigassen) was the annual winter "Movie Wars" film, featuring a crossover between the cast and characters from Kamen Rider Gaim and Kamen Rider Wizard. A short teaser of the film was first shown during the screening of Kamen Rider Wizard in Magic Land, with a new teaser shown after the finale of Wizard revealing the release date to be December 14, 2013.

=== Kamen Rider Taisen ===
Heisei Rider vs. Shōwa Rider: Kamen Rider Taisen feat. Super Sentai (平成ライダー対昭和ライダー 仮面ライダー大戦 feat.スーパー戦隊, Heisei Raidā Tai Shōwa Raidā Kamen Raidā Taisen Fīcharingu Sūpā Sentai) made its theater debut on March 29, 2014. Masahiro Inoue, playing Kamen Rider Decade, alongside many other lead actors of other series appear in the film, including Gaku Sano of Kamen Rider Gaim, Renn Kiriyama of Kamen Rider W, Kohei Murakami and Kento Handa of Kamen Rider 555, Shunya Shiraishi from Kamen Rider Wizard, Ryo Hayami of Kamen Rider X, and Hiroshi Fujioka of the original Kamen Rider. The Sentai teams' Ressha Sentai ToQger and Ryo Ryusei as Daigo Kiryu from Zyuden Sentai Kyoryuger were also in the movie. Shun Sugata playing Kamen Rider ZX from the Birth of the 10th! Kamen Riders All Together!! TV special returns, also performing as Ambassador Darkness. Itsuji Itao of Kamen Rider The First played Ren Aoi, Kamen Rider Fifteen, a main antagonist of the film.

=== Kamen Rider Heisei Generations ===
A Movie War film, titled Kamen Rider Heisei Generations: Dr. Pac-Man vs. Ex-Aid & Ghost with Legend Rider (仮面ライダー平成ジェネレーションズ Dr.パックマン対エグゼイド&ゴーストwithレジェンドライダー, Kamen Raidā Heisei Jenerēshonzu Dokutā Pakkuman Tai Eguzeido Ando Gōsuto Wizu Rejendo Raidā), was released in Japan on December 10, 2016. The film features Kamen Rider Wizard teaming up with Kamen Rider Ex-Aid, Kamen Rider Ghost, Kamen Rider Drive, and Kamen Rider Gaim as they battle against a virus based on Bandai Namco Entertainment's video game character, Pac-Man. The professional wrestler Hiroshi Tanahashi was announced to be one of the main antagonists of the movie.

== Video games ==
A port of Kamen Rider: Climax Heroes titled Kamen Rider: Super Climax Heroes (仮面ライダー 超クライマックスヒーローズ, Kamen Raidā Sūpā Kuraimakkusu Hīrōzu) was released for both the PlayStation Portable and Nintendo Wii during Winter 2012. In addition to adding Kamen Rider Wizard to the game, there are new features in the game. Kamen Rider: Battride War for the PlayStation 3 is also a game featuring Kamen Rider Wizard alongside his predecessors up through Kamen Rider Kuuga.

== Production ==
Trademarks on the title were filed by Toei on June 21, 2012, and it was officially revealed on June 27, 2012.

== Hyper Battle DVD ==
The Hyper Battle DVD for Wizard is titled Kamen Rider Wizard Hyper Battle DVD: Showtime with the Dance Ring (仮面ライダーウィザード 超バトルDVD ダンスリングでショータイム, Kamen Raidā Wizādo Haipā Batoru Dī Buī Dī Dansu Ringu de Shōtaimu). Haruto and Kosuke go into the Donut Shop Manager's Underworld and use the powers of the Dance Ring.

== Novel ==
Novel: Kamen Rider Wizard (小説 仮面ライダーウィザード, Shōsetsu Kamen Raidā Wizādo), written by Tsuyoshi Kida, is part of a series of spin-off novel adaptions of the Heisei Era Kamen Riders. The events of the novel take place after Kamen Rider × Kamen Rider Gaim & Wizard: The Fateful Sengoku Movie Battle. The novel was released on November 1, 2014.

== Cast ==
- Haruto Soma (操真 晴人, Sōma Haruto): Shunya Shiraishi (白石 隼也, Shiraishi Shun'ya)
- Koyomi (コヨミ): Makoto Okunaka (奥仲 麻琴, Okunaka Makoto)
- Shunpei Nara (奈良 瞬平, Nara Shunpei): Junki Tozuka (戸塚 純貴, Tozuka Junki)
- Rinko Daimon (大門 凛子, Daimon Rinko): Yuko Takayama (高山 侑子, Takayama Yūko)
- Kosuke Nito (仁藤 攻介, Nitō Kōsuke): Tasuku Nagase (永瀬 匡, Nagase Tasuku)
- Shigeru Wajima (輪島 繁, Wajima Shigeru): Hisahiro Ogura (小倉 久寛, Ogura Hisahiro)
- Misa (Medusa) (ミサ（メデューサ）, Misa (Medyūsa)), Mayu Inamori (稲森 真由, Inamori Mayu): Erina Nakayama (中山 絵梨奈, Nakayama Erina)
- Yugo (Phoenix) (ユウゴ（フェニックス）, Yūgo (Fenikkusu)): Atsumi (篤海)
- Sora (Gremlin) (ソラ（グレムリン）, Sora (Guremurin)): Takahisa Maeyama (前山 剛久, Maeyama Takahisa)
- Manager of donut shop: Kaba-chan (KABA.ちゃん)
- Worker at donut shop: Ryo Tayano (田谷野 亮, Tayano Ryō)
- Chief of police: Takayasu Komiya (小宮 孝泰, Komiya Takayasu)
- Masanori Kizaki (木崎 政範, Kizaki Masanori): Naoki Kawano (川野 直輝, Kawano Naoki)
- Sou Fueki (笛木 奏, Fueki Sō): Narushi Ikeda (池田 成志, Ikeda Narushi)
- Yuzuru Iijima (飯島 譲, Iijima Yuzuru): Shinta Sōma (相馬 眞太, Sōma Shinta)
- Masahiro Yamamoto (山本 昌宏, Yamamoto Masahiro): Shingo Kawaguchi (川口 真五, Kawaguchi Shingo)

=== Voice cast ===
- White Wizard (白い魔法使い, Shiroi Mahōtsukai): Toshitsugu Takashina (高階 俊嗣, Takashina Toshitsugu)
- Wiseman (ワイズマン, Waizuman): Toshio Furukawa (古川 登志夫, Furukawa Toshio)
- WizarDragon (ウィザードラゴン, Wizādoragon): Ryūzaburō Ōtomo (大友 龍三郎, Ōtomo Ryūzaburō)
- Beast Chimera (ビーストキマイラ, Bīsuto Kimaira): Tomomichi Nishimura (西村 知道, Nishimura Tomomichi)
- Ghouls (グール, Gūru): Yuuki Anai (穴井 勇輝, Anai Yūki), Kazuki Komine (小峰 一己, Komine Kazuki)
- WizarDriver (ウィザードライバー, Wizādoraibā), Narrator: Hiroaki Hirata (平田 広明, Hirata Hiroaki)

=== Guest cast ===
- Caitsith (ケットシー, Kettoshī; 4–5): Bernard Ackah (ベルナール・アッカ, Berunāru Akka)
- Manami Kawasaki (川崎 愛美, Kawasaki Manami; 6–7): Wakana Matsumoto (松本 若菜, Matsumoto Wakana)
- Koichi Yamagata (山形 耕一, Yamagata Kōichi; 6–7): Ryosuke Takahashi (高橋 良輔, Takahashi Ryōsuke)
- Shozo Matsuki (松木 昭造, Matsuki Shōzō; 12–13): Taro Suwa (諏訪 太朗, Suwa Tarō)
- Orphanage director (16): Ichiro Ogura (小倉 一郎, Ogura Ichirō)
- Fortune teller (17): Shoichiro Akaboshi (赤星 昇一郎, Akaboshi Shōichirō)
- Shinto priest (18): Katsumi Nakayama (中山 克己, Nakayama Katsumi)
- Conductor (20–21): Izam
- Toshie Nito (仁藤 敏江, Nitō Toshie; 24–25): Karin Yamaguchi (山口 果林, Yamaguchi Karin)
- Naito (内藤, Naitō; 30–31): Mitsu Murata (村田 充, Murata Mitsu)
- Yoshikazu Kumagai (熊谷 義和, Kumagai Yoshikazu; 44–45): Ginnojō Yamazaki (山崎 銀之丞, Yamazaki Gin'nojō)
- Aya Yamamoto (山本 亜矢, Yamamoto Aya; 47–48, 51): Miyuu Sawai (沢井 美優, Sawai Miyū)
- Amadum (アマダム, Amadamu; 52–53): Tomorowo Taguchi (田口 トモロヲ, Taguchi Tomorowo)
- Kamen Rider Den-O (仮面ライダー電王, Kamen Raidā Den'ō; Voice; 52–53): Toshihiko Seki (関 俊彦, Seki Toshihiko)
- Tsukasa Kadoya (門矢 士, Kadoya Tsukasa; 52 (Voice), 53): Masahiro Inoue (井上 正大, Inoue Masahiro)
- Kota Kazuraba (葛葉 紘汰, Kazuraba Kōta; 52–53): Gaku Sano (佐野 岳, Sano Gaku)

== International Broadcasts ==
- In April 2017, TV Japan began broadcasting the series in the United States and Canada.

== Theme songs ==
Opening theme

- "Life is SHOW TIME"
  - Lyrics: Shoko Fujibayashi
  - Composition & Arrangement: tatsuo (of everset)
  - Artist: Shō Kiryūin from Golden Bomber (鬼龍院 翔 from ゴールデンボンバー, Kiryūin Shō from Gōruden Bonbā)
  The series' theme song was performed by Shō Kiryūin of Golden Bomber as his solo debut single.

Insert themes

- "Last Engage"
  - Lyrics: Shoko Fujibayashi
  - Composition & Arrangement: Ryo (of defspiral)
  - Artist: Kamen Rider Girls
  - Episodes: 4, 10
  The theme of Kamen Rider Wizard Flame Style.
- "Mystic Liquid"
  - Lyrics: Shoko Fujibayashi
  - Composition & Arrangement: Ryo (of defspiral)
  - Artist: Kamen Rider Girls
  - Episodes: 3–4, 15
  The theme of Kamen Rider Wizard Water Style.
- "Blessed wind"
  - Lyrics: Shoko Fujibayashi
  - Composition: Yoshio Nomura
  - Arrangement: Rider Chips
  - Artist: Rider Chips
  - Episodes: 5, 13
  The theme of Kamen Rider Wizard Hurricane Style.
- "Strength of the earth"
  - Lyrics: Shoko Fujibayashi
  - Composition: Yoshio Nomura
  - Arrangement: Rider Chips
  - Artist: Rider Chips
  - Episodes: 6–7, 10, 17
  The theme of Kamen Rider Wizard Land Style.
- "Just The Beginning"
  - Lyrics: Shoko Fujibayashi
  - Composition & Arrangement: AYANO (of FULL AHEAD)
  - Artist: Kamen Rider Girls
  - Episodes: 9, 12
  The theme of Kamen Rider Wizard Flame, Water, Hurricane and Land Dragon.
- "BEASTBITE"
  - Lyrics: Shoko Fujibayashi
  - Composition: Yoshio Nomura
  - Arrangement: Rider Chips
  - Artist: Rider Chips
  - Episodes: 17–19, 34
  The theme of Kamen Rider Beast.
- "alteration"
  - Lyrics: Shoko Fujibayashi
  - Composition & Arrangement: Shuhei Naruse
  - Artist: Kamen Rider Girls
  - Episodes: 26
  The theme of Kamen Rider Wizard All Dragon and Dragon Fourmation.
- "Missing piece"
  - Lyrics: Shoko Fujibayashi
  - Composition & Arrangement: Ryo (of defspiral)
  - Artist: Kamen Rider Girls
  - Episodes: 31–32, 37, 39, 45
  The theme of Kamen Rider Wizard Infinity Style.

The original soundtrack for Wizard was released on November 21, 2012. A compilation album subtitled the Music Magic Collection featuring all of the theme songs seen on the show and its movies was released on September 4, 2013.
