= Yvonne Arias =

American actress and realtor

- Born: July 1, 1985 (age 41); Los Angeles, California, U.S.
- Other names: Aria Alistar; Yvonne Arias
- Occupations: Actress, realtor
- Years active: Actress: 2004–2009; Realtor: 2009–present

Yvonne Neustadter (née Yvonne Arias is an American former actress turned realtor, best known for her role as Maya Young in the television series Kamen Rider: Dragon Knight.

== Life and career ==
Arias' television career began in 2004, with guest appearances on Quintuplets and Eve. She played a recurring role as Dian in the soap opera Passions, appearing in six episodes from 2004 to 2005. In 2008, she co-starred in the CW4Kids series Kamen Rider: Dragon Knight, performing under the stage name Aria Alistar.

Arias left acting to become a real estate broker specializing in hotel residences. She founded The Property Lab, a luxury real estate firm active in Southern California.

== Filmography ==
=== Film ===
Year	Title	Role	Notes	Ref
2005	Confessions of a Pit Fighter	Angel		
2006	Gamers: The Movie	Veronica		
2006	Shut Up and Shoot!	News Reporter		
2007	White Air	Reporter Sanchez		

=== Television ===
Year	Title	Role	Notes	Ref
2004	Quintuplets	Zelda	1 episode	
2004	Eve	woman	1 episode cameo	
2004–2005	Passions	Dian	6 episodes	
2005	ER	Ice Skater	1 episode	
2006	Crumbs	Pretty Waitress	1 episode from Pilot	
2006	Scrubs	Nurse Martinez	2 Episodes	
2008–2009	Kamen Rider: Dragon Knight	Maya Young / Kamen Rider Siren II	(Main Role) credited as Aria Alistar	
