= Kamen Rider: Climax =

Kamen Rider: Climax (仮面ライダー クライマックス, Kamen Raidā Kuraimakkusu; Masked Rider: Climax) is a Bandai Namco and Eighting video game series featuring the protagonists in the Kamen Rider Series.

== Climax Heroes ==
Kamen Rider: Climax Heroes
- Climax Heroes cover for the PS2
- Developer: Eighting
- Publisher: Bandai Namco Games
- Series: Kamen Rider Series
- Platform: PlayStation 2
- Release: JP: August 6, 2009
- Genre: Fighting game
- Modes: Single-player, multiplayer

Kamen Rider: Climax Heroes (仮面ライダー クライマックスヒーローズ, Kamen Raidā Kuraimakkusu Hīrōzu; Masked Rider: Climax Heroes) is a series of 3D fighting game. The original Climax Heroes was released for the PlayStation 2 as part of the 10th anniversary celebration of the Heisei Kamen Rider Series by Toei, TV Asahi, Ishimori Productions, and Bandai. The game spawned four sequels as well as an American version for the Nintendo Wii based on the Kamen Rider: Dragon Knight TV series.

=== Gameplay ===
Combat in the game operates on a basic three-button system, encompassing Weak Attacks, Strong Attacks, and Special Attacks (such as the various Rider Kicks). In addition, many Riders have the ability to perform a Form Change once the Rider Gauge at the bottom of the screen fills by dealing or receiving damage, or by charging the meter. Form Change can be used as a counterattack or to extend combos. A number of Riders also have the ability to summon Strikers, such as Ryuki's Contract Monster Dragredder or Den-O's DenLiner. Also, each Rider has a unique finisher called 'Rider Finale'. This attack can only be activated when the 'Rider Gauge' is full and the R2 button is pressed.

=== Decade Mode ===
In Decade Mode, the player follows Tsukasa Kadoya's journey through nine Heisei Kamen Rider worlds as Kamen Rider Decade, fighting the other Riders and attempting to prevent the destruction of the worlds. Decade Mode differs from standard gameplay in that Decade's Form Change and Special Attacks are customizable with KamenRide Cards and Final FormRide Cards earned as the player progresses. The missions in the mode are divided by three levels, with the easiest missions can be played in Level 1 while the hardest can be found in Level 3. Level 2 and 3 can be unlocked as the player progress in Level 1.

=== Updated Versions ===
==== Climax Heroes W ====
Kamen Rider: Climax Heroes W
- Climax Heroes W cover for the Wii
- Developer: Eighting
- Publisher: Bandai Namco Games
- Series: Kamen Rider Series
- Platform: Wii
- Release: JP: December 3, 2009
- Genre: Fighting game
- Modes: Single-player, multiplayer

Kamen Rider: Climax Heroes W (仮面ライダー クライマックスヒーローズW(ダブル), Kamen Raidā Kuraimakkusu Hīrōzu Daburu), was announced in the October 8, 2009 issue of Weekly Famitsu for a December 3, 2009 release on the Wii. It features Kamen Rider Double from Kamen Rider W as a playable character. In addition to all of the playable characters from the first game, more playable characters were introduced, such as Double, Kaixa, and PunchHopper.

==== Climax Heroes OOO ====
Kamen Rider: Climax Heroes OOO
- Climax Heroes OOO cover for the Wii
- Developer: Eighting
- Publisher: Bandai Namco Games
- Series: Kamen Rider Series
- Platforms: PSP; Wii
- Release: JP: December 2, 2010
- Genre: Fighting
- Modes: Single-player, multiplayer

Kamen Rider: Climax Heroes OOO (仮面ライダー クライマックスヒーローズ オーズ, Kamen Raidā Kuraimakkusu Hīrōzu Ōzu) was announced by Famitsu on August 9, 2010, released on both the PlayStation Portable and Wii on December 2, 2010. These versions of the games introduce Kamen Rider OOO of Kamen Rider OOO as a playable character, as well as Kamen Rider Accel from Kamen Rider W, the remaining Riders from Kamen Rider Ryuki, several other Riders, and the most powerful forms of all of the previous Heisei Riders as playable characters rather than aspects of the base forms' finishing attack. The custom soundtrack feature is introduced exclusively on PSP version. Players can now switch to other variantions of Rider Art, as result of having a different variantions such as Multiple form changes, Summons and Stronger form, depending on which Kamen Rider the player chooses.

Ragnarok Mode is based on "Mirror World" from the Wii version of Kamen Rider: Dragon Knight.

==== Climax Heroes Fourze ====
Kamen Rider: Climax Heroes Fourze
- Climax Heroes Fourze cover for the Wii
- Developer: Eighting
- Publisher: Bandai Namco Games
- Series: Kamen Rider Series
- Platforms: PSP; Wii
- Release: JP: December 1, 2011
- Genre: Fighting game
- Modes: Single-player, multiplayer

Kamen Rider: Climax Heroes Fourze (仮面ライダー クライマックスヒーローズ フォーゼ, Kamen Raidā Kuraimakkusu Hīrōzu Fōze) was released on both the PlayStation Portable and Wii on December 1, 2011. These versions of the games introduced Kamen Rider Fourze and the Showa Era Kamen Riders as playable characters to commemorate the franchise's 40th anniversary. Some new gameplay options were also added, such as tag-team battle. A number of characters also have their sound effects improved from the previous installments of the series. Ragnarok Mode returns as Heroes Mode and has new stages and monsters.

==== Super Climax Heroes ====
Kamen Rider: Super Climax Heroes
- Super Climax Heroes cover for the Wii
- Developer: Eighting
- Publisher: Bandai Namco Games
- Series: Kamen Rider Series
- Platforms: PSP; Wii
- Release: JP: November 29, 2012
- Genre: Fighting game
- Modes: Single-player, multiplayer

Kamen Rider: Super Climax Heroes (仮面ライダー 超クライマックスヒーローズ, Kamen Raidā Sūpā Kuraimakkusu Hīrōzu) was released on November 29, 2012 for PlayStation Portable and Wii, with the addition of several new playable characters such as Kamen Rider Wizard, Kamen Rider Meteor from Kamen Rider Fourze, and secondary Riders such as Gills, Chalice and Sasword from other series. It is the last installment to bear a Climax Heroes title. The game features a free run mode and a new control system. The gameplay features an air to air combat similar to Marvel vs. Capcom and Arc System Works fighting game series. However, almost every characters on certain form/weapon sets to have Air Combo moves on their move lists. A Rider Art System, which features moves or skills that are based on recreating scenes from the TV series, was also introduced.

== Climax Fighters ==
Kamen Rider: Climax Fighters
- Developer: Eighting
- Publishers: Bandai Namco Entertainment; Daewon Media (South Korea)
- Series: Kamen Rider Series
- Engine: Unity
- Platform: PlayStation 4
- Release: JP: December 7, 2017; SEA: December 7, 2017; KOR: December 7, 2017
- Genre: Fighting game
- Modes: Single-player, multiplayer

Kamen Rider: Climax Fighters (仮面ライダー クライマックスファイターズ, Kamen Raidā Kuraimakkusu Faitāzu; Masked Rider: Climax Fighters) was released on December 7, 2017 for PlayStation 4, with the addition of several new playable characters, such as Kamen Rider Gaim, Kamen Rider Drive, Kamen Rider Ghost, and Kamen Rider Ex-Aid, including Kamen Rider Beast from Kamen Rider Wizard who appeared in previous Kamen Rider games, and a newly introduced Kamen Rider Build. Much like in the two first Kamen Rider: Battride War games prior its Genesis sequel, the playable rosters consists of the titular Heisei Riders and the secondary Riders from Heisei era Phase 2. However, Kamen Rider BLACK was the first and only Showa Rider to be announced on November 22, 2017, as part of the titular Showa Rider's 30th anniversary. It is also the first Climax installment to be PlayStation exclusive since the original Climax Heroes.

This game is the first time a Kamen Rider game has been available in South East Asia with English subtitle, and Korean with Korean voices.

=== Gameplay ===
Unlike Kamen Rider: Climax Heroes series, Climax Fighters is an arena fighting game, battling inside the 3D battle arena similar to the Gundam Vs. series, Naruto Ultimate Ninja Storm, Dissidia: Final Fantasy and Dragon Ball Xenoverse 2.

== Climax Scramble ==
Kamen Rider: Climax Scramble
- Developer: Lancarse
- Publishers: Bandai Namco Entertainment; Daewon Media (South Korea)
- Series: Kamen Rider Series
- Engine: Unity
- Platform: Nintendo Switch
- Release: JP: November 29, 2018; SEA: November 29, 2018; KOR: November 29, 2018; TW: November 29, 2018; HK: November 29, 2018
- Genre: Fighting game
- Modes: Single-player, multiplayer

Kamen Rider: Climax Scramble in Japan known as Kamen Rider: Climax Scramble Zi-O (仮面ライダー クライマックススクランブル ジオウ, Kamen Raidā Kuraimakkusu Sukuranburu Jiō) was released on November 29, 2018 exclusively for Nintendo Switch that features the newly introduced Riders from Kamen Rider Zi-O, which includes its secondary Kamen Rider Geiz alongside his predecessor Kamen Rider Cross-Z from Kamen Rider Build, including Kamen Rider BLACK's main rival/arch-enemy Shadow Moon, meaning BLACK will have a vital role in this game's storyline. Kamen Rider Core from Kamen Rider × Kamen Rider OOO & W Featuring Skull: Movie War Core will also appear as one of the bosses. This is the first Climax game to feature downloadable contents and the first Kamen Rider game to add upcoming Rider forms/armors to part of the upgrade moveset for regular version of the playable Rider, whereas Kamen Rider Zi-O's Double Armor from Heisei Generations Forever movie was released as part of the free upgrade moveset for regular Kamen Rider Zi-O himself on December 25, 2018, while the tertiary Rider from his series, Kamen Rider Woz will be released on January 15, 2019, making him the first and only tertiary Rider to appear in this game.

It is a direct sequel to Kamen Rider: Climax Fighters, in term of having an updated gameplay from the previous game. It is also the second Climax installment to be Nintendo exclusive being the first since Climax Heroes W.

== See also ==
- Kamen Rider: Dragon Knight (Wii)
