= Kamen Rider: Dragon Knight =

American superhero television series

- Title card
- Genre: Action/Adventure; Science fiction Superhero; Mystery; Tokusatsu; Drama
- Created by: Steve Wang
- Based on: Kamen Rider Ryuki by Shotaro Ishinomori and Toei Company
- Developed by: Steve Wang; Mike Wang
- Starring: Stephen Lunsford; Matt Mullins; Aria Alistar
- Opening theme: "Kamen Rider Dragon Knight" by Cage9
- Composer: Tony Phillips
- Countries of origin: United States; Japan
- Original language: English
- No. of seasons: 1
- No. of episodes: 40 (list of episodes)

Production
- Executive producers: Yasuo Matsuo; Fumio Sebata; Aki Komine
- Producers: Steve Wang; Mike Wang; Roy McAree
- Production locations: Los Angeles, California; Castaic, California; Saitama, Japan; Tokyo, Japan; Kyoto, Japan; Yokohama, Japan
- Running time: 22 minutes
- Production companies: Adness Entertainment; Toei Company; Ishimori Productions

Original release
- Network: The CW (CW4Kids)
- Release: December 13, 2008 – December 18, 2009

Related
- Masked Rider (TV series)

Kamen Rider: Dragon Knight is a science fiction superhero television series that originally aired in the United States on The CW, as part of the CW4Kids programming block, from December 13, 2008, to December 26, 2009. It is an adaptation of the Japanese tokusatsu series Kamen Rider Ryuki and is the second American adaptation of the Kamen Rider franchise after Saban's Masked Rider (1995). The series was developed for television by Power Rangers alumni Steve and Michael Wang and produced by Jimmy Sprague via Adness Entertainment.

The series had a sneak premiere on December 13, before its official premiere the following year on January 3, 2009. The series was dropped at the end of the year before its final two episodes aired. The final episodes were made available to watch on the 4Kids TV website from December 18, 2009, until the series was removed in 2012.

In 2010, Dragon Knight was nominated for and won the Daytime Emmy Award for "Outstanding Stunt Coordination", a category introduced to the Daytime Emmys that year.

== Plot ==
While searching for his missing father, Kit Taylor finds an Advent Deck—a special card deck that allows the carrier to transform into a Kamen Rider and utilize unique weapons and powers—and uses it to become Kamen Rider Dragon Knight. He butts heads with Len, who serves as Kamen Rider Wing Knight, but the pair join forces after Kit learns that an alien warlord named Xaviax is responsible for his father's disappearance and intends on abducting him and the entire human race to gain power and rebuild Xaviax's homeworld.

Xaviax tricks people on Earth into working for him by promising them whatever they want, or in some cases, by exploiting their fears and desperation. Kit wonders why Xaviax has to trick them and why he doesn't just find bad guys to do the work for him. Len tells Kit that the decks were only made for one person and that only a person with an exact DNA match to the original Ventaran rider could use it. This is why Kit can use the Dragon Knight Deck: he is the exact Mirror Twin of Adam, the original Dragon Knight, who betrayed the original team. One of the new Earth Riders, Chris Ramirez (serving as Kamen Rider Sting and tricked by Xaviax into believing he is working in a special ops government program to fight alien invaders), joins forces with Kit and Len when he discovers he has been deceived but is Vented—a process which traps defeated Riders in the "Advent Void" between dimensions forever and removes their Advent Decks—along the way. Kit vents Albert Cho, brother of Danny Cho, in retaliation. This leads to a personal hatred between Danny and Kit, as Danny seeks to avenge his brother against Xaviax's orders.

Later, Kase, a fellow survivor of Ventara like Len, joins forces with Len and Kit to fight Xaviax. In addition to training Kit as a Kamen Rider, Len and Kase tell Kit all about the twelve Riders who banded together as the protectors of Ventara—a world opposite to our own—to take Xaviax down. However, due to the unintentionally–traitorous actions of Kit's predecessor, Adam, Xaviax vented most of the Riders. Furthermore, Xaviax continues to send out Riders who fight to eliminate Kit, Len, and the other Riders who oppose him. After Kit is Vented, Xaviax recruits Adam to once again become Dragon Knight. Unlike when Xaviax convinced Adam to 'betray' the Riders by playing to his desire to remain with the girl he loved, Xaviax now uses a combination of blackmail and using Adam's girlfriend as a hostage to force Adam to work for him.

Meanwhile, Len uses his Advent Deck to awaken the Advent Master Eubulon—who brings back the Ventaran Kamen Riders from the Advent Void—and Kit, who becomes Kamen Rider Onyx. He also brings back Kase, though Eubulon is forced to briefly reassign the Advent Deck to Maya Young while Kase is trapped in the Advent Void. Once Kase is better, Maya gives back the deck, and the Riders head for Xaviax's base to destroy him. In the end, all the Ventaran Riders regain their decks, while all the Earth Riders (except Kit) have been released from the Advent Void & have their memories erased and returned to their normal lives, leaving Kit as the true owner of the Dragon deck after the previous owner Adam retires his deck thus officially becoming Kamen Rider Dragon Knight & the only active Earth Kamen Rider, leaving the Onyx deck inactive. But as the remnants of Xaviax's army and other dangers continue to threaten Ventara & Earth, Kit, along with Len, Kase and the other riders continue to protect both planets.

== Cast ==
- Stephen Lunsford as Kit Taylor, Adam / Dragon Knight
- Matt Mullins as Len / Wing Knight
- Aria Alistar as Maya Young
- William O'Leary as Xaviax
- Marisa Lauren as Lacey Sheridan
- Taylor Emerson as Trent Moseley
- Kathy Christopherson as Michelle Walsh
- Carrie Reichenbach as Kase / Siren
- Tony Moras as Richie Preston, Ian / Incisor
- Christopher Foley as Drew Lansing, Chance / Torque
- Christopher Babers as Grant Staley, Van / Camo
- Scott Bailey as James "JTC" Trademore, Price / Strike
- Keith Stone as Brad Barrett, Cameron / Thrust
- Michael Cardelle as Chris Ramirez, Quinn / Sting
- Mike Moh as Danny Cho, Hunt / Axe
- Tony Sano as Albert Cho, Chase / Spear
- Mark Cameron Wystrach (of the country band Midland) as Vic Frasier, Nolan / Wrath
- Jeff Davis (aka Jf Davis) as Frank Taylor
- James Patterson as Detective Grimes
- Jamison Jones as Agent Phillips
- Mark Dacascos as Eubulon
- Camila Greenberg as Sarah

=== Guest stars ===
- Kathleen Gati as Kit's foster mother
- Victoria Jackson as Aunt Grace
- Camila Mendes as Rachel
- T. J. Storm as Grant's master

== Production ==
=== Development ===
In July 2006, producer Aki Komine received special permission from Toei to produce a pre-show pilot for an American production of Kamen Rider. Komine approached filmmaker and long-time Kamen Rider fan Steve Wang and his brother Michael Wang to help develop, write, and direct a pre-show pilot. Komine subsequently obtained the rights after Toei was pleased with the pre-show pilot. The show then received independent financing from Komine and his partner Fumio Sebata. According to early licensing information for the series, Adness Entertainment had intended to also film a feature-length movie for Dragon Knight. In an interview, Steve Wang stated that they had written a story for a film, but that Adness was now raising money to bring over another Kamen Rider for broadcast in the US rather than a film or a second season of Dragon Knight.

=== Writing ===
Komine chose to adapt Kamen Rider Ryuki for merchandising purposes due to the amount of reoccurring characters and monsters the show had, including a female Rider. Steve employed his brother Michael and long-time friend Nathan Long to write the show. Long and the Wang brothers wrote the story and structure of the show to connect with the action/effects footage of Kamen Rider Ryuki, a technique done in previous Americanizations such as Godzilla, King of the Monsters!, Power Rangers and Saban's Masked Rider. Some key elements and minor characteristic traits from Kamen Rider Ryuki were kept but other elements had to be remade to meet the standards and practices for American children's programming. Bandai initially pushed the filmmakers to aim the show for five-year-old children but Steve wished to aim the show towards a young adult audience.

=== Title ===
At the time of this show's production, Toei marketed the Japanese Kamen Rider franchise as "Masked Rider" in romanized or English writing, including this show's source material, which has its title romanized as Masked Rider Ryuki on its own logo. However, Wang convinced Toei to keep the title of the show as Kamen Rider for this American adaptation instead of using Masked Rider, stating, "Growing up, I never watched 'Masked Rider'... it was always KAMEN RIDER and seeing it called 'Masked' always felt strange. I'm just not a fan of using descriptions to name a character such as 'Masked'. That's like calling Darth Vader 'Armored Sith Lord'. It's silly to me." This decision was also made to distance Dragon Knight with Saban's earlier Masked Rider TV series (an adaptation of Kamen Rider Black RX). Toei eventually followed suit by switching from Masked Rider to Kamen Rider in the romanized titles of their shows, starting with Kamen Rider W.

=== Filming ===
Akihiro "Yuji" Noguchi choreographed the action sequences of the show. Due to the show using a majority of the action/effects footage of Kamen Rider Ryuki, pre-planning was established so that the new footage matched the backgrounds and stunts of the Japanese footage however, the crew shot a majority of new footage to use less of the Japanese footage on some episodes. The suits for the Kamen Riders and monsters were re-fabricated and sent by Toei. The costume department was always on-set to have the suits camera-ready due to taking "abuse" not only from the American production but the previous Japanese production. The suit for General Xaviax was the only original design from the American production, designed by Steve Wang.

== International broadcasts ==
Dragon Knight was shown in Brazil on Rede Globo during its TV Globinho programming block before being replaced by a re-run of Dragon Ball in September 2009 (due to the early and daily exhibition); Brazil's Cartoon Network was then the only venue airing the show until it came back to TV Globinho as a part of its Saturday Morning timeblock in January, 2010. The show was aired in Mexico on Televisa and in Peru on Global Television. It also aired in Germany, Austria, Switzerland, and Liechtenstein on RTL II. but RTL II cancelled the show after 17 episodes due to low ratings. The dubbed version of the series also aired on Indonesian's free-to-air TV channel Indosiar on Sunday mornings at 6:00 am (UTC+07:00). There were plans in 2009 to air the series in Colombia on Caracol TV, in Italy on Mediaset, in Latin America on Cartoon Network, and on other Cartoon Network affiliates in Southeast Asia, the Philippines, India, Pakistan, and Australia. On the Australian digital free-to-air channel 9Go! the show airs on Tuesday mornings at 7:30 am.

It was also broadcast in Japan on Toei's satellite subscription channel Toei Channel in the fall of 2009 as part of the Heisei Kamen Rider series 10th Anniversary project. Voice actors brought onto the project include Tatsuhisa Suzuki as Kit/Kamen Rider Dragon Knight, Hiroki Takahashi as Richie Preston/Kamen Rider Incisor, Hiroshi Kamiya as Chris Ramirez/Kamen Rider Sting, Hideo Ishikawa as Vic Frasier/Kamen Rider Wrath and Takahiro Sakurai as Danny Cho/Kamen Rider Axe. The dub was then aired again on TV Asahi in 2010.

Previous actors from the Kamen Rider franchise who lend their voices to the cast include:

- Rikiya Koyama (Joe The Haze in Black RX) as Frank Taylor.
- Satoshi Matsuda (Ren Akiyama/Kamen Rider Knight in Ryuki) as Len/Kamen Rider Wing Knight.
- Yuria Haga (Mari Sonoda in 555 and Mio Suzuki in Kiva) as Maya Young.
- Kōji Yusa (Urataros in Den-O) as Drew Lansing/Kamen Rider Torque.
- Tomokazu Sugita (Kivat-bat the 3rd in Kiva) as JTC/Kamen Rider Strike.
- Kenji Matsuda (Kamen Rider Zanki in Hibiki and Jiro/Garulu in Kiva) as Grant Staley/Kamen Rider Camo.
- Shouma Yamamoto (Takato Shiramine/Kamen Rider Rey in Kiva: King of the Castle in the Demon World and Taiga Nobori/Kamen Rider Saga in Kiva) as Brad Barrett/Kamen Rider Thrust.
- Ryouta Murai (Yusuke Onodera/Kamen Rider Kuuga in Decade) as Albert Cho/Kamen Rider Spear.
- Miyuki Sawashiro (Kiva-la in Decade) as Kase/Kamen Rider Siren.
- Hōchū Ōtsuka (Deneb in Den-O) as Xaviax.
- Tsuyoshi Koyama (Kamen Rider Odin / the Visor Voice in Ryuki) as Eubulon.

On TV Asahi affiliate broadcasts of the Japanese-dubbed Dragon Knight, the song "Dive into the Mirror" by defspiral, is used as the opening theme. The group also performed as Wilma-Sidr for Kamen Rider W. The song "ANOTHER WORLD", sung by Tatsuhisa Suzuki and Satoshi Matsuda under the pseudonym "Kit×Len", was used as the ending theme.

=== International DVD releases ===
In addition to airing outside the United States, Kamen Rider: Dragon Knight is available on DVD in certain countries. In Brazil, 13 DVD Volumes containing all 40 episodes were released by PlayArte Home Video even though their site only lists the first two. In Germany, "Season 1 – Vol. 1" and "Season 1 – Vol. 2" were released on DVD by EuroVideo and m4e (Made For Entertainment) in February 2010, but no other volumes have been released, due to the show's cancellation in that country. On July 21, 2010, Toei released the first DVD box set of Kamen Rider: Dragon Knight containing the first 20 episodes along with a DVD release of a Special Event that took place in January 2010 in Japan. Throughout the summer of that year, Toei released 10 DVD Volumes of all 40 episodes as well as a second box set with the last 20. In most parts of Asia, 10 DVD Volumes and 2 DVD box sets of all 40 episodes were released by Medialink. There are no current plans to release Dragon Knight in the United States, despite the release of several of the Japanese Rider series, including Kamen Rider Ryuki, the series from which Dragon Knight draws its footage, on Blu-Ray in the US.

== Novel ==
A sequel novel titled Kamen Rider Dragon Knight: 2WORLDS 1HEARTS was released exclusively in Japan on September 16, 2010. Taking place a year after the main series, it introduces Len's Earth counterpart, Brian Mace, and the novel's main antagonist, David Stuart.

== Video games ==
Kamen Rider: Dragon Knight
- Developers: Natsume Co., Ltd. (Nintendo DS); Eighting (Wii)
- Publisher: D3 Publisher
- Engine: Climax Heroes (Wii)
- Platforms: Nintendo DS; Wii
- Release: NA: November 17, 2009
- Genre: Fighting
- Modes: Single-player, multiplayer (Wii only)

A fighting game based on the series was released for the Nintendo DS and Wii platforms by D3 Publisher on November 17, 2009.

=== Nintendo DS version ===
The Nintendo DS version of the game was developed by Natsume Co., Ltd. The player uses Advent Cards to perform special attacks based on how much the Advent Gauge is filled up, with the Final Vent being used when all three bars are full. The Advent Gauge is charged by touching and holding the Rider until all three bars are full. The player must select two different cards before each battle, with Final Vent, the Rider's Contract Beast, and the Rider's primary weapon (sword vent or strike vent, etc.) automatically in each Rider's deck. Contrary to the show, the cards Copy Vent, Steal Vent, Freeze Vent, Confine Vent, and Strange Vent can all be used by any character.

The game's "Ventara Mode" is a series of missions where the player must fight Advent Beasts and other Riders, with a chance of unlocking them (as well as more Advent Cards) in a certain mission. Xaviax is the final boss for all players except Wrath, who fights Dragon Knight as the final boss due to Wrath being possessed by Xaviax as in the show, and defeating Xaviax yields a different game ending for each of the playable Riders. Xaviax himself becomes a playable character in "Duel Mode" and "Advent Master Mode" (an arcade-style mode) once all 13 Riders are unlocked and the player has defeated every mission (including defeating Xaviax himself) available in the "Ventara Mode" for each Rider. In addition to the 13 Riders and Xaviax, twelve of Xaviax's assorted monsters from the show can be used as playable characters in the "Duel Mode".

Despite being a fighting game, it only supports single player.

=== Wii version ===
The Wii version was developed by Eighting and uses a modified engine based on Kamen Rider: Climax Heroes for the PlayStation 2, which was also developed by Eighting. The two games use the same stages and music. Similarly, Dragon Knight and Onyx's character models were recycled from Ryuki and Ryuga's character models. Play mechanics for Dragon Knight, however, were changed significantly. The Rider Gauge (now Advent Gauge) does not charge and can only be filled by attacking the opponent without special attacks. Depending on how much the Advent Gauge is filled up, the player can perform special attacks by using an Advent Card, with the Final Vent being used when the gauge is full. The player can select any Advent Card before each fight. Contrary to the show, each Rider has access to the Advent Cards "Confine Vent," and "Return Vent," which- respectively- disable an opponent's card and counteract the effects of Confine Vent. Each Rider is allowed to have Six Advent cards at once and while their advent beast is always available the others can only be used once per round. The regular advent and Final Vent are always in a player's arsenal and cannot be removed.

Unlike the DS version, the player can only unlock both Dragon Knight and Wing Knight's survive mode in "Mirror World" mode while the rest of the Riders have to be unlocked in Arcade Mode. Xaviax is only a non-playable boss in both Mirror World and Arcade Mode. If the game is played with Wrath, who is possessed by Xaviax, the player faces Dragon Knight in Mirror World and Onyx in Arcade mode.

The game's "Mirror World" mode is a feature not in Climax Heroes and is a series of missions where the player not only fights against other Riders in one-on-one battles, but also defeats foot soldiers in beat 'em up-like stages, which were not featured in the Climax Heroes series until Climax Heroes OOO for the PSP and Wii, with more stages and kaijins. As the player progress, not only is he able to use other Riders, but he gains Rider Points to buy more Advent Cards in Card Mode.

Unlike the single player-only DS version, the Wii release supports up to two players.
