= Dance My Generation =

Single by Golden Bomber
- Released: January 1, 2013 (Japan)
- Songwriter: Kimura Shou

Golden Bomber singles chronology
"Yowasete Mojito" (2011)	"Dance My Generation" (2013)	"101 Kaime no Noroi" (2014)

"Dance My Generation" is a single by Japanese band Golden Bomber.

== History ==
It was released on January 1, 2013. It debuted in number one on the weekly Oricon Singles Chart and reached number one on the Billboard Japan Hot 100. It was the 34th best-selling single in Japan in 2013, with 177,565 copies. The song is featured in the 2014 dance video game Just Dance Wii U.
