= Defspiral =

Japanese visual kei rock band

- Also known as: Wilma-Sidr
- Origin: Hyogo, Japan
- Genres: Alternative metal
- Years active: 2010 (as Wilma-Sidr); 2010–present (as Defspiral)
- Labels: Stirring/Defspiral, Avex Mode, Plug/Knowledge Alliance/PCI Music
- Members: Taka; Masato; Ryo; Kazuki
- Past members: Masaki
- Website: defspiral.com

Defspiral (stylized as defspiral, and briefly existing under the name Wilma-Sidr) is a Japanese visual kei alternative metal band composed of most of the former members of the Underneath. When the Underneath disbanded in 2010, most of the group was signed to Avex Mode to perform songs for the Kamen Rider Series. This occurred with a change to their style to a smoother, slicker and more seductive style than their previous incarnations.

== History ==
Before entirely disbanding, the Underneath, sans Tal, reunited under the name Wilma-Sidr to perform "Leave all Behind", the theme song for Kamen Rider Accel for the Kamen Rider W soundtrack. "Leave all Behind" was released as a single on April 28, 2010.

The Wilma-Sidr line-up then reunited under the name Defspiral on Avex Group's Avex Mode label and released the single "Dive into the Mirror", the opening theme song for TV Asahi broadcasts of Kamen Rider: Dragon Knight. Prior to the switch, Ryo had been serving as an arranger for songs on the Kamen Rider Den-O, Kiva and Decade soundtracks.

After the contract with Avex ended, Defspiral signed onto Pony Canyon's Knowledge Alliance/PCI Music imprint, releasing singles "Twilight" and "Revolver" in 2010, and released "Melody/Story" independently and via Sonic Scope Records in 2011. The Defspiral members also worked on the musical Pink Spider inspired by the music of deceased X Japan guitarist hide in 2011. The group's debut album Progress was released in late October 2011, showing a stronger musical style with only the solo guitarist. On December 7, Defspiral released a 4-track maxi single titled "Reply -Tribute to hide-" as a tribute to the late hide, who signed the members' previous band Transtic Nerve to his label. It is composed of covers of his songs "Pink Spider", "Doubt", "Rocket Dive" and "Flame".

They covered Luna Sea's "Rosier" for Crush! 3 – 90's V-Rock Best Hit Cover Love Songs-, which was released on June 27, 2012 and features current visual kei bands covering love songs by visual kei bands of the 90s.

After being with Transtic Nerve, the Underneath and defspiral since 1995, founding member and drummer Masaki left the band on May 26, 2021 after their 10th anniversary tour final Dearest Freaks at Tsutaya O-West. The concert was supposed to be held one year earlier, but was postponed due to the COVID-19 pandemic. New drummer Kazuki officially joined Defspiral at their 12th anniversary concert on May 28, 2022.

== Members ==
- Taka – vocals (2010–present)
- Masato – guitar (2010–present)
- Ryo – bass (2010–present)
- Kazuki (和樹) – drums (2022–present)

=== Former members ===
- Masaki – drums (2010–2021)

== Discography ==
=== As Wilma-Sidr ===
Singles

- "Leave all Behind" (2010, Avex Mode)

=== As defspiral ===
Albums

- Progress (2011, Plug)
- Voyage (2013, Sonic Scope)
- Brilliant World (2015, Sonic Scope)

Singles

- "Dive into the Mirror" (2010, Avex Mode)
- "Revolver" (2010, Plug/Knowledge Alliance/PCI Music)
- "Twilight" (2010, Plug/Knowledge Alliance/PCI Music)
- "Melody/Story" (2011, Sonic Scope)
- "Reply -Tribute to hide- (2011, Plug)
- "Break the Silence" (2012, Sonic Scope)
- "Lotus" (2012, Sonic Scope)
- "Glare" (2013, Sonic Scope)
- "Masquerade" (2013, Sonic Scope)
- "Serenade/Thanatos" (2013, Sonic Scope)
- "Carnaval" (2014, Sonic Scope)
- "Brilliant" (2014, Sonic Scope)
- "Dream of you" (2015, Sonic Scope)
