= Life Is Show Time =

- The cover of the standard CD+DVD edition featuring Kamen Rider Wizard (left) and Shō Kiryūin

Single by Shō Kiryūin from Golden Bomber
- Released: October 24, 2012
- Recorded: 2012
- Genre: J-rock, alternative rock, J-pop
- Length: 3:47
- Label: Avex Entertainment
- Songwriters: Shoko Fujibayashi, tatsuo

Kamen Rider Series theme song singles chronology
| "Switch On!" (2011) | "Life Is Show Time" (2012) | "Just Live More" (2013) |

"Life Is Show Time" (stylized as "Life is SHOW TIME") is the debut solo single of Golden Bomber vocalist Shō Kiryūin (credited as "Shō Kiryūin from Golden Bomber"). It serves as the opening theme song to the 2012 Kamen Rider Series Kamen Rider Wizard. In recording the song, Kiryūin stated that he felt closer to being like his idol Gackt, who performed a previous Kamen Rider Series' theme song in 2009. The single had 4 editions released: a standard CD release, a standard DVD release containing the music video, and two additional limited edition DVD releases subtitled "Oni" (鬼; "Demon) and "Ikusa" (戦; "War) which include edited versions of the music video.

== Overview ==
"Life Is Show Time" performed well on Japan's various music charts, reaching number 3 on the Oricon's Weekly Chart on the week of its release, a debut at number 1 on the Daily Charts, and an overall 11 on the Monthly Charts for October. On dwango's Ring Tone download charts, it debuted at number 1, with other number 1's on the Billboard Japan Hot 100 and Japan Hot Singles Sales charts. It also reached 20 on the Billboard Japan Hot Top Airplay chart and number 3 on Count Down TV's chart.

== Music video ==
The music video for "Life Is Show Time" features Japanese professional wrestler Hiroshi Tanahashi, professional boxer Daiki Kameda, and judoka Keiji Suzuki battling Ghouls, the low level enemies that Kamen Rider Wizard also battles.

== Track listing ==
All lyrics are written by Shoko Fujibayashi; all music is composed by tatsuo.

| No. | Title | Arrangement | Length |
|---|---|---|---|
| 1. | "Life is SHOW TIME" | tatsuo | 3:55 |
| 2. | "Life is SHOW TIME" (WIZARD Orchestra Edit) | Kōtarō Nakagawa | 4:42 |
| 3. | "Life is SHOW TIME" (Instrumental) | | 3:55 |
| Total length: | | | 12:32 |

Standard release DVD
| No. | Title | Length |
|---|---|---|
| 1. | "Life is SHOW TIME" (music video) |

Oni edition
| No. | Title | Length |
|---|---|---|
| 1. | "Life is SHOW TIME" (music video) |
| 2. | "Life is SHOW TIME" (music video Oni EDIT) |

Ikusa edition
| No. | Title | Length |
|---|---|---|
| 1. | "Life is SHOW TIME" (music video) |
| 2. | "Life is SHOW TIME" (music video Ikusa EDIT) |
