= Golden Bomber =

Japanese visual kei rock band

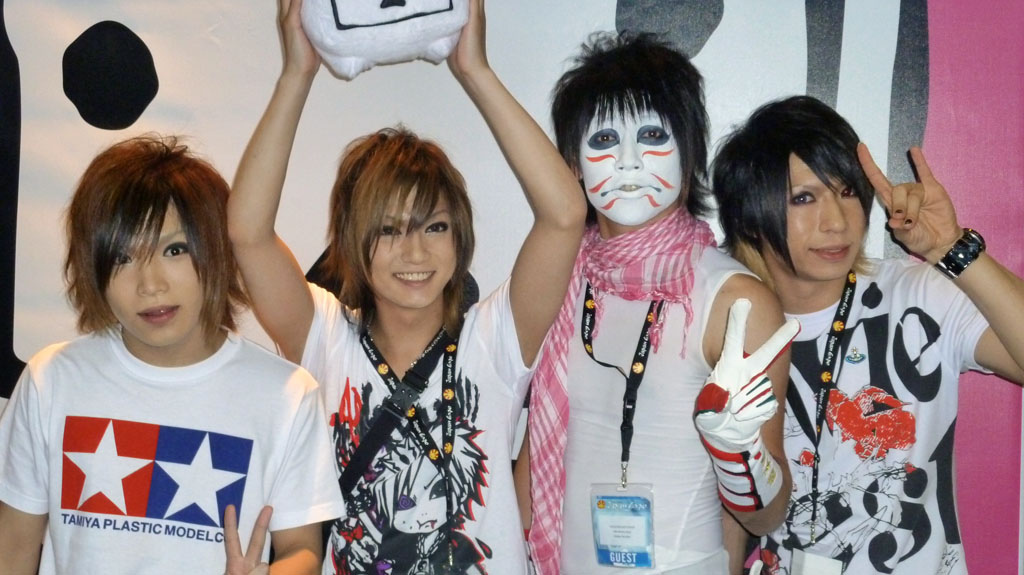
- Golden Bomber at Japan Expo 2011

Background information
- Origin: Japan
- Genres: Pop punk, power pop, comedy rock
- Years active: 2004–present
- Labels: Euclid/Zany Zap; Atlantic (2008–present)
- Members: Shō Kiryūin; Kenji Darvish; Jun Utahiroba; Yutaka Kyan
- Past members: Dankichi Tenkujō; Teppei Chimatsuri; Niwatoriwa Susatobeni

Golden Bomber (ゴールデンボンバー, Gōrudenbonbā; abbreviated as Kinbaku (金爆), Bomber (ボンバー, Bonbā) or GB) is a Japanese visual kei "air" rock band formed in 2004 and signed to the independent label Euclid Agency (sublabel Zany Zap). Despite not actually performing the instruments themselves during concerts, they have gained popularity through their theatrical "live shows".

== History ==
The band was formed in 2004 by vocalist Shō Kiryūin and guitarist Yutaka Kyan. The band's concept was "Hyper Giga Hybrid Super Subculture Visual Rock". Teppei Chimatsuri joined as the first drummer and keyboardist; when he left later, Dankichi Tenkujō took over as drummer. Jun Utahiroba joined as bassist on 22 April 2007. On 5 April 2009, Dankichi left the band, and on 10 April 2009, Kenji Darvish joined as a drummer.

None of the members except Shō Kiryūin play instruments for the band. The band's studio recordings are done by professional musicians, as attested to by the group members themselves. Shō Kiryūin writes the music and lyrics, and creates the arrangements with Tatsuo of Everset. In concert, the band members don't play their instruments; instead they dance and perform and act out dramas with the aid of videos. Akiho Minami of Japanese pop culture website Real Sound suggests this may have been influenced by Malice Mizer, whose guitarists Mana and Közi would put down their instruments and dance during certain songs. Shō Kiryūin is the only member who always sings live. The band's creative output, including songs, music videos, promotional videos and performances, contains parodies of famous bands, artists, manga and other aspects of Japanese popular culture.

Their first single, "Dakishimete Schwarz", was released on 1 May 2008, followed by four more consecutive singles. Their first two albums, The Golden J-Pops and Renai Shuukyouron, went on sale on 24 December 2007, and their first live DVD was released that same day. In 2009, Golden Bomber had 12 consecutive one-man concerts on the 1st day of each month and performed a country-wide "4646" tour. Their most famous song, "Memeshikute", was released as a single on 21 October 2009.

Through 2010 they continued putting on their one-man concerts during the "Oneman Kowai" and "Zenryoku Baka" tours, and they released 12 consecutive monthly songs on dwango.jp. All the songs released on dwango reached No. 1 in dwango daily rankings. In 2010, the band was due to perform in Shanghai, China, during Expo 2010, but the performance was cancelled.

The popularity of the band increased significantly through 2010. By the end of the year, Golden Bomber had received major debut offers from seven companies, but rejected them all, preferring to remain a "good-for-nothing" indie band out of consideration for feelings of their fans. Their "Mata Kimi ni Bangou wo Kikenakatta" single reached No. 4 on Oricon weekly charts and was ranked No. 3 on the Oricon 2010 year top selling indies singles chart. The Shimohanki Best album was ranked No. 3 on the Oricon weekly chart.

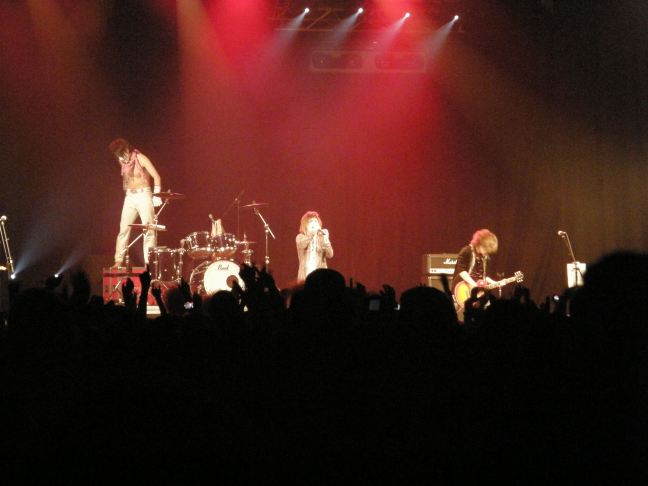
Golden Bomber performing at Japan Expo 2011

In 2011, Golden Bomber continued with the "Life is All Right" spring national tour (the initial name of the tour, "Isshou Baka (Lifetime Idiot)" was changed due to the earthquake and tsunami in Japan). In July, Golden Bomber performed at Japan Expo in Paris, France, and played two live shows in Seoul, South Korea, in August. The "Yareba Dekiru Ko" national tour was announced for autumn 2011.

On 14 and 15 January 2012, Golden Bomber performed at Nippon Budokan, and at Osaka-jō Hall on 21 January.

Golden Bomber also performed for two days at the Yokohama Arena on 17 and 18 June 2012. On 18 June 2012, they released their first international album, The Golden Best, in the UK, USA, France, Germany, Taiwan, and Korea.

Golden Bomber also hosts a program on Nico Nico Douga. The members have collaborated with different artists not only from music, but also from the fashion industry, with different fashion brands and game producers.

In 2014, Golden Bomber was featured in Japanese television commercials for Mr. Donut and Softbank.

In 2016, the band was one of the first acts announced for Visual Japan Summit, a multi-artist event hosted by rock group X Japan at Makuhari Messe on 14–16 October 2016.

In 2019, Golden Bomber released a song and music video titled "Reiwa" just hours after the new Japanese era's name had been officially announced.

== Members ==
- (Vocals): Shō Kiryūin (鬼龍院 翔, Kiryūin Shō)
  - Born on 20 June 1984, in Tokyo.
  - Writes all music and lyrics by himself. He can play various musical instruments, including violin.
  - Created lots of parody songs of songs by famous singers and bands, imitating their melody, lyrics, singing style. For example, "Ultra Phantom" is Koshi Inaba, "Tsunami no Johnny" – Keisuke Kuwata imitation.
  - A host of the All Night Nippon radio program, from 5 January 2011 to 29 June 2015.
  - Released his autobiography "I’m Golden Bomber’s vocalist, are there any questions?" on 20 June 2012.
  - Fan of Gackt and Malice Mizer.
  - Made his solo debut with the opening theme "Life Is Show Time" from Kamen Rider Wizard.
  - On 4 September 2021, Kiryūin announced his marriage to his non-celebrity girlfriend on that same day.
- (Guitar): Yutaka Kyan (喜矢武 豊, Kyan Yutaka)
  - Born on 15 March 1985, in Tokyo.
  - He creates all the stage properties for the shows on his own.
  - Played main role in "Shi ga futari wo wakatsu made" film ("Iro no nai Ao" chapter) released in September 2012
  - On 21 August 2021, Kyan announced that he had been tested positive for COVID-19.
  - Has competed on Sasuke (Japanese version of Ninja Warrior) since 31st tournament.
- (Bass guitar): Jun Utahiroba (歌広場 淳, Utahiroba Jun)
  - Born as Takayama Jun (高山淳) on 30 August 1985, in Chiba.
  - Graduated Nihon University, Faculty of Fine Arts Literature Department.
  - Writes an interview column called "No Ikemen No Life" about music artists in Monthly TVnavi magazine
  - Big fan of Jun Matsumoto.
  - On 25 July 2016, Jun announced his marriage to his non-celebrity girlfriend of two years. The private ceremony took place in June 2016. In March 2019, Jun announced that his wife had given birth to a daughter. The couple welcomed their second child, a son, in August 2021.
  - On 6 August 2020, Jun announced that he had been tested positive for COVID-19.
- (Drums): Kenji Darvish (樽美酒 研二, Darubisshu Kenji)
  - Born on 28 November 1980, in Fukuoka.
  - Joined on 10 April 2009.
  - Famous for doing white-black-red kabuki-like make-up
  - Originally a guitarist, also did vocals in his previous band, now vocalist in Reverset.
  - His blog is published as a book "The Best of Obama blog" on 2 February 2012
  - Famous for appearing in the 28th, from 30th to 39th and 41st tournaments of Sasuke (Japanese version of Ninja Warrior).

=== Past members ===
- Doramu: Dankichi Tenkūjō (天空城 団吉, Tenkūjō Dankichi)
  - Born on 13 August 1984, in Hokkaido.
  - Left on 5 April 2009 at Takadanobaba Club Phase live.
- Drums: Teppei Chimatsuri (血祭 鉄兵, Chimatsuri Teppei)
  - Born on 15 March 1974, in Nagasaki.
  - First air-drummer, also played keyboards on stage.
  - Joined on 24 December 2005 at Roppongi Edge live.
  - Left on 15 March 2007 at Ikebukuro Cyber live.
  - He and Shō Kiryūin were originally colleagues of the same shop of Lawson.
- Doramu: Riku Toriaezu (鶏和酢 里紅, Toriaezu Riku)
  - He stood in as an air-drummer and an air-keyboardist when Dankichi Tenkujo left, when Tenkujo returned he went back to being a staff member.
  - He managed BAR of "Beer Bar Lemon Heart" in Tokyo.
  - Now, He is on manga-art café Care Zenon's staff, and the assistant of Japanese Manga "BAR Lemon Heart" .

== Music relationships ==
Different musicians took part in Golden Bomber recordings, Golden Bomber also appeared together with a number of bands. (Deluhi Leda, Janne Da Arc shuji, Ikuo, Hiroki, La'cryma Christi Shuse, Kishidan, Shokotan etc.)

== Discography ==
=== Singles ===
No.	Title	Title (Japanese)	Date of release	Notes
01	Dakishimete Schwarz / Doutei ga!	抱きしめてシュヴァルツ / 童貞が!	1 May 2008	
02	Saite Saite Kirisaite / Masashi	咲いて咲いて切り裂いて / まさし	1 June 2008	
03	Gomen ne, Aishiteru / Kame Power	ごめんね、愛してる/ 亀パワー	1 July 2008	
04	Torauma Kyabajou / Motokare Korosu	トラウマキャバ嬢 / 元カレ殺ス	1 August 2008	
05	Hotel Love / Itsumo to Onaji Yoru	ホテルラブ / いつもと同じ夜	1 September 2008	
06	Blow Wind / Time Machine ga Hoshii yo	Blow Wind / タイムマシンが欲しいよ	17 June 2009	Joint single with Smily☆Spiky. "Time Machine ga Hoshii yo" is 5pb.'s game Skip Beat! ending theme
07	Memeshikute	女々しくて	21 October 2009	3 types. Oricon Weekly chart No. 77, Oricon Indies chart No. 4
08	Mou Bandoman ni Koi Nante Shinai	もうバンドマンに恋なんてしない	25 November 2009	2 types. Oricon Weekly Chart No. 103
09	Mata Kimi ni Bangou wo Kikenakatta	また君に番号を聞けなかった	6 October 2010	3 types. Oricon Weekly Chart No. 4, Oricon Indies Chart No. 1
10	Boku Quest	僕クエスト	1 June 2011	4 types. Oricon Weekly Chart No. 5, Oricon Indies Chart No. 1. "Boku Quest" is Yu-Gi-Oh! Zexal anime ending theme.
11	Memeshikute/Nemutakute	女々しくて/眠たくて	24 August 2011	3 types Oricon Weekly Chart No. 4, Oricon Indies Chart No. 1
12	Yowasete Mojito	酔わせてモヒート	23 November 2011	3 types Oricon Weekly Chart No. 3
13	Dance My Generation	Dance My Generation	1 January 2013	3 types Oricon Weekly Chart No. 1
14	101 Kaime no Noroi	101回目の呪い	1 January 2014	4 types Oricon Weekly Chart No. 1
15	Laura no Kizudarake	ローラの傷だらけ	20 August 2014	Oricon Weekly Chart No. 2
16	Shinda Tsuma ni Niteiru	死 ん だ 妻 に 似 て い る	29 May 2015	4 types, sung by Kiryuin Shou, Kyan Yutaka, Utahiroba Jun, Darvish Kenji
17	Mizushōbai o Yamete Kurenai Ka	水商売をやめてくれないか	27 April 2016	
18	Odoru Pompokolin	おどるポンポコリン	9 November 2016	Opening song for the Chibi Maruko-chan anime series since 10 April 2016. The B-side is Yume Ippai, the cover of the first opening of the Chibi Maruko-chan anime series.
19	#CD ga Urenai Konna Yononakaja	#CDが売れないこんな世の中じゃ	5 April 2017	
20	Yanya Yanya Night – Odoroyo ※※ –	やんややんやNight ～踊ろよ※※～	8 November 2017	Different versions were released for each prefecture, with the title and lyrics changing to reflect the prefecture it was released in.
21	Tatsuo . . . Yome wo Ore ni Kure	タツオ・・・嫁を俺にくれ	1 September 2018	
22	Gagagagagagaga	ガガガガガガガ	20 February 2019	
23	Reiwa	令和	17 April 2019	
24	Human/ningen	人間だ	25 December 2022	
25	Yeah!metcha stress	Yeah!めっちゃストレス	25 December 2022	

=== Albums ===
No.	Title	Title (Japanese)	Date of release	Notes
01	Ongaku ga bokura wo dame ni suru	音楽が僕らを駄目にする	24 December 2006	Was distributed at the first lives in the venues. Out of production. Contained 7 songs, including Suppin (スッピン, "Without make-up")
02	The Golden J-Pops	The Golden J-Pops	24 December 2007	Was distributed at live venues. Out of production.
03	Ren'ai Shuukyouron	恋愛宗教論	24 December 2007	Was distributed at live venues. Out of production.
04	Imitation Gold ~Kinbaku no Meikyoku Niban Shibori~	イミテイション・ゴールド〜金爆の名曲二番搾り〜	1 January 2009	The parodies of hit songs by famous artists: Gackt, Southern All Stars, CHAGE and ASKA, B'z, Aqua Timez.
05	Sorinokoshita Natsu	剃り残した夏	29 July 2009	Soundtrack CD for "Sorinokoshita Natsu" film
06	Golden Album	ゴールデン・アルバム	4 January 2012	4 types Oricon weekly No. 2
07	The Past Masters Vol.1	ザ・パスト・マスターズ	24 April 2013	
08	No Music No Weapon	ノーミュージック・ノーウエポン	17 June 2015	Oricon weekly No. 1
09	Kirāchūn shikanē yo	キラーチューンしかねえよ	31 January 2018	
10	Mō kōhaku ni dashite kurenai	もう紅白に出してくれない	28 December 2019	
11	COMPACT DISC	COMPACT DISC	8 February 2023	

=== Best albums ===
No.	Title	Title (Japanese)	Date of release	Notes
01	Golden Best ~Pressure~	ゴールデンベスト〜Pressure〜	6 January 2010	Oricon Chart No. 150
02	Golden Best ~Brassiere~	ゴールデンベスト〜Brassiere〜	6 January 2010	Oricon Chart No. 193
03	Golden Hour ~ Kamihanki Best 2010~	ゴールデン・アワー〜上半期ベスト2010〜	21 July 2010	Oricon Daily Chart No. 6, Oricon Weekly Chart No. 14, Oricon Indies Chart No. 1
04	Golden Hour ~ Shimonanki Best 2010~	ゴールデン・アワー〜下半期ベスト2010〜	6 January 2011	Oricon Daily Chart No. 1, Oricon Weekly Chart No. 3
05	The Golden Best	The Golden Best	18 June 2012	6 versions. Released by Atlantic Records.

=== PV ===
01. Memeshikute (女々しくて)

02. Mou Bandoman ni Koi Nante Shinai (もうバンドマンに恋なんてしない)

03. Mata Kimi ni Bangou wo Kikenakatta (また君に番号を聞けなかった). 3 versions

04. Boku Quest (僕クエスト). 3 versions

05. Memeshikute (女々しくて) from Memeshikute/Nemutakute single. 2 versions

06. Yowasete Mojito (酔わせてモヒート)

07. Ii Hito （いい人）

08. Sayonara Fuyumi （さよなら冬美）

09. Chéng lóng hěn kù (成龍很酷) (01/01/12)

10. Dance My Generation (01/01/13)

11. Gomen ne, aishiteru (ごめんね、愛してる)

=== DVD ===
No.	Title	Title (Japanese)	Date of release
01	Gyaru Punch DE Batan Q (Out of production)	ギャルパンチDEバタンQ	24 December 2007
02	"Kinbaku Nengoro Tour Final Hatsu Oneman "Ai wa Chikyuu wo Sukuu" ~Miwa-san 100 km Marathon~	"金爆ねんごろツアー ファイナル 初ワンマン 「愛は地球を巣喰う」〜美輪さん100kmマラソン〜"	1 February 2009
03	Sorinokoshita Natsu (Golden Bomber performance, script, direction.)	剃り残した夏	29 July 2009
04–09	Golden Bomber 2009 Year Oneman Live DVD (January – June)	ゴールデンボンバー 2009年ワンマンライブDVD (1月-6月)	24 December 2009
10–15	Golden Bomber 2009 Year Oneman Live DVD (July – December)	ゴールデンボンバー 2009年ワンマンライブDVD (7月-12月)	1 January 2010
16	Dai-ichi Yoru Request on the Best ~Pressure night~	第一夜 リクエスト・オン・ザ・ベスト～Pressure night～	10 March 2010
17	Dai-ni Yoru Request on the Best ~Brassiere night~	第二夜 リクエスト・オン・ザ・ベスト～Brassiere night～	10 March 2010
18	"Stylish Weapon ’10 ~Haru no SoyoKaze~ Omake no Ran	"Stylish Weapon ’10 〜春のそよ風〜おまけの乱”	27 April 2010
19	Golden Bomber Hatsu Kyoufu no Zenkoku Oneman Tour -Oneman Kowai- Tsuika Kouen(2010/6/25@Shibuya O-WEST)」	「ゴールデンボンバー 初 恐怖の全国ワンマンツアー -ワンマンこわい-追加公演(2010/6/25@渋谷O-WEST)」	30 July 2010
20	Golden Bomber Pantsu Daisakusen Tour Final (2010/9/24 @Ebisu Liquidroom)	ゴールデンボンバー パンツ大作戦ツアーファイナル (2010/9/24恵比寿LIQUIDROOM)	24 November 2010
21	Zenryoku Baka(2010/12/27@SHIBUYA-AX)	「全力バカ」(2010/12/27@SHIBUYA-AX)	25 February 2011
22	SoCcer 24	SoCcer 24	15 March 2011
23	"Life is all right" Tsuika Kouen (2011/5/17@TOKYO DOME CITY HALL)	"Life is all right"追加公演(2011/5/17@TOKYO DOME CITY HALL)	27 July 2011
24	Golden Bomber Zepp Tour 2011 "Yareba Dekiruko" 2011.10.7 at Zepp Tokyo	ゴールデンボンバー Zepp全通ツアー 2011 "やればできる子" 2011.10.7 at Zepp Tokyo	21 December 2011
25	Golden Bomber OneMan Live Tokudaigou "Isshou Baka" 2012.15.01 at Nippon Budokan	ゴールデンボンバーワンマンライブ特大号「一生バカ」公演、 1月15日（日）日本武道館	18 March 2012
26	Golden Bomber OneMan Live Tokudaigou "Isshou Baka" 2012.14.01 at Nippon Budokan	ゴールデンボンバーワンマンライブ特大号「一生バカ」公演、 1月14日（土）日本武道館	16 March 2012
27	Golden Bomber OneMan Live Tokudaigou "Isshou Baka" 2012.21.01 at Osaka Jo Hall	ゴールデンボンバーワンマンライブ特大号「一生バカ」公演、 1月21日（日）大阪城ホール	30 March 2012

=== Limited distribution ===
No.	Title	Title (Japanese)	Date of release
01	JUSTICE Kyoto ni Tsugu Shoku no Utage album ("Announcement for JUSTICE Believers... Food Feast") 1.DANDAN Kokoro Hikareteku (Field of View cover); 2.Ai no Mama ni Wagamama ni Boku wa Kimi dake wo Kizutsukenai (B'z cover); 3.Beethoven da ne Rock'n'Roll ("21 Emon" Ending cover); 4.Donna Toki Mo (Noriyuki Makihara cover)	JUSTICE教徒に告ぐ・・蝕の宴 1.収録曲:DAN DAN 心魅かれてく(Field of View のカバー) 2.愛のままにわがままに僕は君だけを傷つけない(B'zのカバー) 3.ベートーベンだねRock'n'Roll(21エモンのオープニングのカバー) 4.どんなときも。(槇原敬之のカバー)	31 October 2007
02	Datsu Indies Cover Shuu ("Indies Cover Compilation") single 1. Meteo no Hi (Idenshi Kumikae Kodomokai cover)	「脱・インディーズカバー集」 1.メテオの日(遺伝子組換こども会のカバー)	7 June 2008
03	Miwa-san 100 km Marathon Documentary	美輪さん100kmマラソンドキュメント	21 July 2008
04	Miwa-san Osaka⇒Tokyo Hitch-hiking	美輪さん大阪⇒東京横断ヒッチハイク	22 November 2008
05	"Legendary Creatures Really Existed!! Chase after the Kappa who appeared in megapolis Tokyo!!!!"	伝説の妖怪は実在した!!大都会東京に現れた河童を追え!!!!	4 January 2009
06	"In midwinter it's cold for Atonu"	真冬にアトヌは寒い	1 February 2009
07	Golden Busters, last time prompt! Environmental pollution resulted in mutation? At last we've seen mysterious creature, Kentaurus! "Kentaurus makes heart beat faster" Documentary DVD	ゴールデンバスターズ、さっそく最終回！ 環境汚染が引き起こした突然変異か？！ ついに我々は謎の生物、ケンタウロスを見た！！ 〜ケンタウロスドキドキドキュメントDVD〜	1 March 2009
08	"Show your rock soul! All 21 songs! Gold-gold extatic live!" Special DVD "Extremey rare Heartwarming DVD"	～Rock魂見せてやれ！ 全21曲！金金がギンギンライブ！～ [特典DVD]激レアほのぼのDVD	5 April 2009
09	Kokucchao!	告っchao!	3 May 2009
10	Tomorrow never world	Tomorrow never world	3 May 2009
11	Gi-ga-!	ギーガー!	3 May 2009
12	"Total coverage documentary! Forever continuing big depression! Surviving in city full make-up singer ~Homeless visual kei~ Yamada-san"	密着ドキュメント!いつまでも続く大不況!都会を生き抜く フルメイクシンガー 〜ホームレスビジュアル系〜	3 May 2009
13	It's not 20th, it's the 7th! Vo. Kiryuin Sho Birthday Oneman Live! Special DVD – "Kiryuuin Sho's splendid development"	20日じゃないよ7日だよ！Vo.鬼龍院翔バースデーワンマンライブ！ 特典DVD 鬼龍院翔の華麗なる生い立ち	7 June 2009
14	"Dripping sweat, losing weight, become thin" oneman live. Special DVD – "Before becoming Miwa-san"	汗かきゲッソリ激ヤセワンマンライブ！ 特典DVD 美輪さんができるまで	5 July 2009
15	Haru ga Kuru Mae ni (Yamada-san version)	春が来る前に(夜魔堕さんVer.)	29 July 2009
16	"Middle of summer! Hidden in "I hate suntan" phase Kinbaku summer festival!" Special DVD – "Gita- Solo Kyan Yutaka! ~July tour eating local products revolt~"	夏真っ盛り！日焼け大嫌いフェイズに隠れて金爆夏祭り！ 特典DVD ギターソロ喜矢武豊！ 〜7月ツアー名産品食べまくりの乱〜	2 August 2009
17	"Congratulations on 34 years! Yawara-chan Birthday" Oneman Live! Kin at highest, Baku at lowest. Special DVD – "Yawara-chan Birthday Special ~Legend of YAWARA"	祝34歳！ヤワラチャンバースデーワンマンライブ！ 「最高で金、最低でも爆」 特典DVD 〜ヤワラチャン誕生日スペシャル〜 Legend of YAWARA	6 September 2009
18	"Evangelist of love, showing the ass! Miwa-san's men's ass festival"	ケツ出せ愛の伝道師！美輪さん男尻祭り!	4 October 2009
19	Gachupin Challenge Series! First part!	ガチュピン チャレンジシリーズ！第一弾！	1 November 2009
20	"Unexpectedly landing in the middle" trip – GLOY Homecoming to Hokkaido Compilation-"	ぶらり途中着陸の旅-GLOY 北海道帰郷編-	6 December 2009
21	Mou Bandoman Ni Koi Nante Shinai (Kyan Yutaka version)	もうバンドマンに恋なんてしない(喜矢武 豊Ver.)	15 December 2009
22	Kokucchao! (Kyan Yutaka version)	告っchao!(喜矢武 豊Ver.)	16 December 2009

=== Omnibus works ===
1. Tribute to Murakami (2007) Omnibus Release
  - Featured song: Ikiteita Murakami
2. Zany Zap Complex (22 July 2009) Omnibus Release
  - Featured songs: Sick Lady Tabun.../Tsunami no Johnny/Motokare Korosu
3. Neo Voltage (26 May 2010) Omnibus Release
  - Featured song：†Za・VKei-ppoi Kyoku†

=== Songs written for other artists ===
- The Boss – "Love Days" – lyrics and music by Shō Kiryūin
- Dancing Dolls – "Melomelo Bakkyun" from the single "Touch -A.S.A.P- / Shanghai Darling" – lyrics and music by Shō Kiryūin

== Media ==
=== Drama CD ===
- Genpei Gakuen Kassen Roku (2010). Kiryūin Shō – Imai Kanehira role, Kyan Yutaka – Taira no Munemori role, Utahiroba Jun – Kisou role, Darvish Kenji – Kisou role

== Filmography ==
=== Variety programs ===
- Everyone's Best Kouhaku 100th Anniversary of Broadcasting Special (NHK, 2025) (cast)
