= Loudness discography =

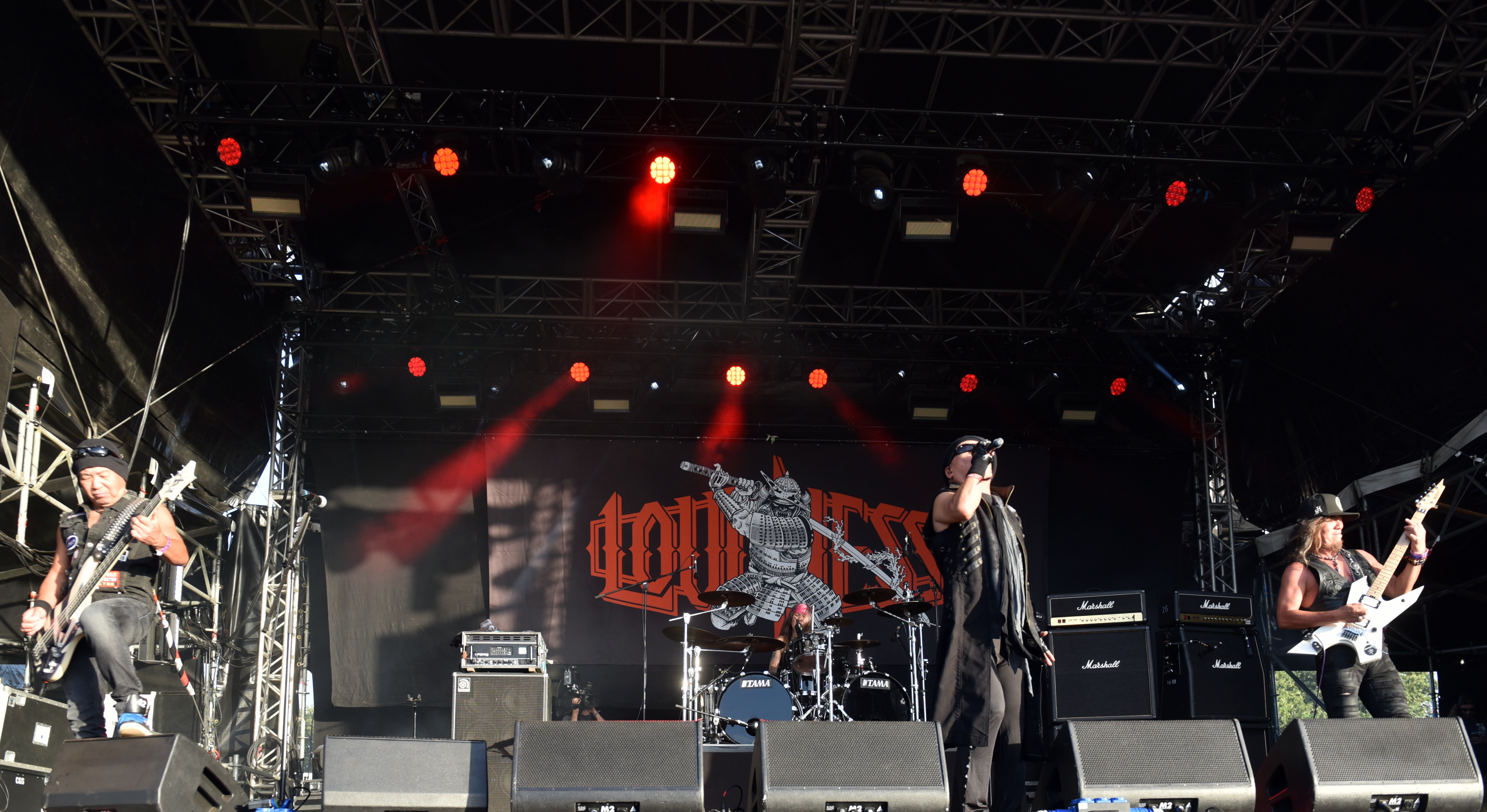
Loudness at Wacken Open Air 2022

This is the discography of Loudness, a pioneering Japanese heavy metal band formed in 1981 in Osaka. It consists of 26 studio albums, three EPs, eight live albums, 15 singles and 16 compilation albums, thus making Loudness one of the world's most prolific heavy metal bands.

== Discography ==
=== Albums ===
==== Studio albums ====
Year	Titles	Peak chart positions	
Year	Titles	JPN	US
1981	The Birthday Eve		
1982	Devil Soldier		
1983	The Law of Devil's Land		
1984	Disillusion		
1984	Disillusion (English Version)		
1985	Thunder in the East	4	74
1986	Shadows of War		
1986	Lightning Strikes (U.S. Remix of Shadows of War)		64
1987	Hurricane Eyes		190
1987	Hurricane Eyes (Japanese Version)	34	
1989	Soldier of Fortune	18	
1991	On the Prowl	7	
1992	Loudness	2	
1994	Heavy Metal Hippies	29	
1997	Ghetto Machine	65	
1998	Dragon	49	
1999	Engine	48	
2001	Spiritual Canoe	20	
2001	Pandemonium	27	
2002	Biosphere	45	
2004	Terror	88	
2004	RockShocks	37	
2004	Racing	60	
2005	Racing (English Version)	174	
2006	Breaking the Taboo	129	
2008	Metal Mad	51	
2009	The Everlasting	42	
2010	King of Pain	21	
2011	Eve to Dawn	36	
2012	2012	33	
2014	The Sun Will Rise Again	29	
2015	The Sun Will Rise Again (U.S. Mix)		
2016	Samsara Flight	19	
2018	Rise to Glory	13	
2021	Sunburst	5	

==== Live albums ====
Year	Titles	JP
1983	Live-Loud-Alive: Loudness in Tokyo	
1986	8186 Live	
1994	Once and for All	48
1995	Loud 'n' Raw	55
2000	Eurobounds	
2001	The Soldier's Just Came Back	76
2003	Loudness Live 2002	259
2009	Live Loudest at the Budokan '91	
2017	8186 Now and Then	
2019	Live In Tokyo: Loudness World Tour 2018 Rise to Glory	
2019	Loudness Japan Tour 19 Hurricane eyes+Jealousy: Live at Zepp Tokyo 31 May 2019	55

==== Compilations ====
Year	Titles	JP
1986	Never Stay Here, Never Forget You	
1989	Early Singles	
1991	Loudest	59
1991	Loudest Ballads	
1996	Best Songs	
1996	Masters of Loudness	
1997	Very Best of Loudness	
2001	Best of Loudness 8688: Atlantic Years	71
2001	Re-Masterpieces	94
2005	The Best of Reunion	139
2007	Loudness Complete Box	
2009	Golden Best Loudness: Early Years Collection	
2012	Loudness Best Tracks: Columbia Years	156
2012	Loudness Best Tracks: Warner Years	130
2012	Loudness Best Tracks: Tokuma Japan Years	177
2012	Single Collection	

=== EPs ===
Year	Titles
1985	Gotta Fight (Odin)
1988	Jealousy
1989	A Lesson in Loudness [promo]
1991	Loud 'N' Rare
1991	Slap in the Face

=== Singles ===
Year	Titles	JP	Album
1982	"Burning Love"/"Bad News"		Non-album singles
1983	"Geraldine"/"In the Mirror"		Non-album singles
1983	"Road Racer"/"Shinkiro"		Non-album singles
1984	"Milky Way" (English version)/"Milky Way" (Japanese version) [promo]		Disillusion
1985	"Crazy Nights"/"No Way Out"		Thunder in the East
1985	"Never Change Your Mind" [promo]		Thunder in the East
1985	"Gotta Fight"/"Odin"		Non-album single
1986	"Let It Go"/"Farewell"/"Dark Desire"		Shadows of War
1986	"Let It Go"/"1000 Eyes"		Lightning Strikes
1986	"Risky Woman"/"Silent Sword"/"The Night Beast"	32	Non-album single
1987	"So Lonely"/"Strike of the Sword"		Hurricane Eyes
1987	"This Lonely Heart"/"Take Me Home" [promo]		Hurricane Eyes
1987	"Rock 'N Roll Gypsy" [promo]		Hurricane Eyes
1988	"Long Distance Love"/"Good Things Going"	58	Jealousy
1989	"Dreamer & Screamer"/"Die of Hunger"		Jealousy
1989	"You Shook Me"/"Faces in the Fire"	79	Soldier of Fortune
1991	"Down 'n' Dirty"/"Take It (Or Leave It)"	97	On the Prowl
1991	"In the Mirror"/"Sleepless Nights"		On the Prowl
1991	"Sleepless Nights" [promo]		On the Prowl
1992	"Black Widow"/"Racing the Wind"	30	Loudness
1992	"Firestorm" [promo]		Loudness
1992	"Slaughter House"/"House of 1,000 Pleasures" (live)/"S.D.I." (live)	40	Loudness
1994	"Electric Kisses"/"House of Freaks (Alternate Guitar version)"		Heavy Metal Hippies
2004	"Crazy Samurai"/"R.I.P."/"Cyber Soul" (live)	72	Racing
2005	"The Battleship Musashi"/"Wolfgang Amadeus"/"More Than Machine"	89	Non-album singles
2010	"The Eternal Soldiers"/"The Danger Zone"	143	Non-album singles

== Videography ==
Year	Titles
1983	Live-Loud-Alive: Loudness in Tokyo
1984	Eurobounds
1985	Thunder In The East Vol. I
1985	Thunder In The East Vol. II
1986	Live in Tokyo - Lightning Strikes
1991	Video Loudest
1992	Black Widow - Once and for All
1992	Welcome to the Slaughterhouse
2001	The Soldier's Just Came Back - Live Best
2002	Loudness Live: Loudness Presents Loud'n Fest Vol.1 at Club Citta - official bootleg, series 1
2002	20th Anniversary Pandemonium Tour: Live @ NHK Hall 2001.11.25
2003	Live Biosphere
2004	Loudness Live Terror 2004
2005	Rock-Shocking the Nation
2005	Loudness Live in Germany - limited edition
2006	Loudness Live in Seoul 20051203 - official bootleg, series 2
2006	Loudness in America '06 Live Shocks Worid Circuit 2006 Chapter 1
2007	Thanks 25th Anniversary: Loudness Live at International Forum 20061125
2008	Liveshocks 2008 Metal Mad Quattro Circuit - official bootleg, series 3
2008	The Legend of Loudness - Live Complete Best
2009	Munetaka Higuchi Forever Our Hero 20090214
2010	Classic Loudness Live 2009 Japan Tour the Birthday Eve - Thunder in the East
2010	Munetaka Higuchi Forever Our Hero 20091114
2011	Loudness World Circuit 2010 Complete Live
2011	Lightning Strikes World Circuit 2010 Asia Tour
2012	Everlasting Munetaka Higuchi 2010
2012	Loudness 30th Anniversary World Tour In USA 2011 Live & Document
2012	Loudness 2011-2012 Live & Document In Japan
2013	Loudness 2012 Complete DVD - Regular Edition Live & Document
2013	Loudness 2012 Complete DVD - Limited Edition Live Collection
2013	Loudness Best Music Videos 85-12
2014	Loudness Complete Live DVD World Circuit 2013
2014	Prime Cut Masterpiece Sessions - Dedicated to Munakata Higuchi
2016	Loud ∞ Out Fest 2016
2017	Loudness Japan Tour 2017 "Lightning Strikes" 30th Anniversary 8117 at Zepp Tokyo 13 April 2017
2019	Loudness World Tour 2018 Rise To Glory Metal Weekend
2019	Loudness Japan Tour 19 Hurricane Eyes + Jealousy Live at Zepp Tokyo 31 May, 2019
