= Japanese metal =

Metal music from Japan

Japanese metal (Japanese: ジャパニーズ・メタル, Hepburn: Japanīzu metaru) is heavy metal music from Japan. The country's first metal bands formed in the mid-to-late 1970s. The number of acts increased significantly in the next decade, but only a few saw their material released internationally, including Europe and North America with their pre-established metal bases. Domestic metal saw its commercial peak in Japan in the late 1980s and early 1990s, with the top acts selling millions of records. Many metal bands from the visual kei scene toured and gained recognition in the West in the 2000s. The 2010s saw a boom of all-female metal bands form and gain mainstream attention.

== 1970s: Early acts ==
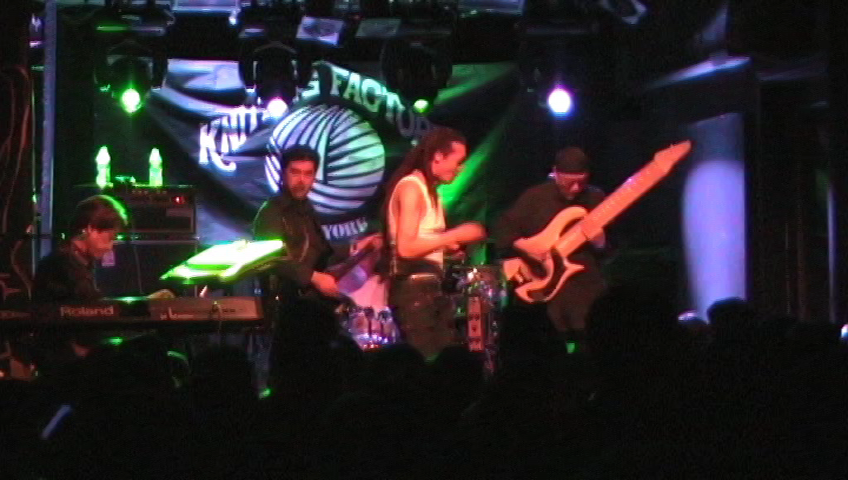
The Flower Travellin' Band were pioneers of heavy metal.

Originally formed in 1967 as a cover band of British and American psychedelic rock titled "Yuya Uchida & the Flowers," Japan's Flower Travellin' Band have been credited as one of the progenitors of heavy metal music. After changing their name, having almost a complete personnel change and moving to Canada, they produced their first album of original material in 1971. Satori, which was released a little over a year after Black Sabbath's debut album, has been called "proto-metal" and noted as having "traces of early heavy metal." Their previous album, Anywhere (1970), included what is believed to be the first recorded cover of a Black Sabbath song, the self-titled "Black Sabbath". Additionally, Satori and Flower Travellin' Band vocalist Joe Yamanaka and guitarist Hideki Ishima's work on Kuni Kawachi's first solo album Kirikyogen (1970) have been credited as "honing the formidable and ominous sound that would become the essence of doom metal." Another 1971 Japanese album that has been described as proto-metal, is Demon & Eleven Children by Blues Creation.

Japanese heavy metal bands started emerging in the late 1970s, pioneered by Bow Wow (1975), 44 Magnum (1977) and Earthshaker (1978).

In 1977, Bow Wow supported Aerosmith and Kiss on their Japanese tours. They performed at both the Montreux Jazz Festival in Switzerland and the Reading Festival in England in 1982. After some member changes resulted in a more commercial sound, they changed their name to Vow Wow and relocated to England. Their 1989 album Helter Skelter reached number 75 on the UK Albums Chart.

Although formed by schoolmates in 1977, Lazy saw a rift between their managers/producers, who wanted to create a pop rock idol band, and the musicians themselves who slowly took control and moved the band to the hard rock and heavy metal they always desired to play by their final album Earth Ark in 1980.

== 1980s ==
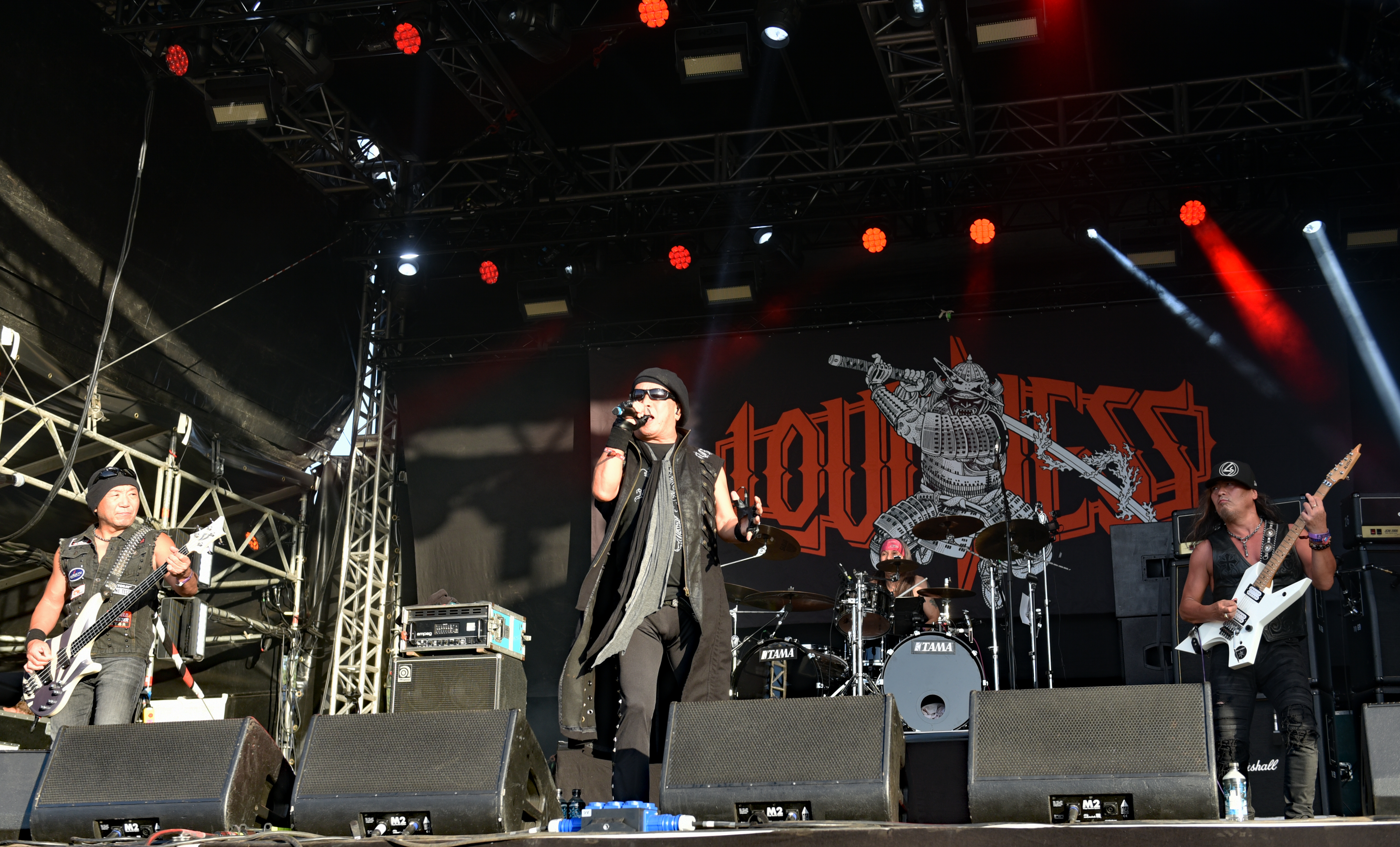
Loudness charted on America's Billboard chart several times in the 1980s.

In the 1980s, a plethora of Japanese heavy metal bands formed. Loudness was formed in 1981 by former Lazy members Akira Takasaki and Munetaka Higuchi. In 1983, they toured the United States and Europe and soon started focusing more on an international career. In a 1985 deal with Atco Records, Loudness became the first Japanese metal act signed to a major label in the United States. Their albums Thunder in the East (1985), Lightning Strikes (1986) and Hurricane Eyes (1987) reached numbers 74, 64 and 190 on the Billboard chart. Loudness replaced singer Minoru Niihara with American vocalist Michael Vescera in 1988, in an unsuccessful attempt to further their international popularity.

Seikima-II, with their kabuki-inspired makeup, and X Japan, who pioneered the movement known as visual kei, both formed in 1982. In 1985, Seikima-II's debut album Seikima-II - Akuma ga Kitarite Heavy Metal was released, reached number 48 on the Oricon Albums Chart and made them the first Japanese metal band to sell 100,000 copies. Its follow-up, The End of the Century (1986), reached number 5 and sold twice that amount. Seikima-II's 1989 compilation album Worst made them the first Japanese metal band to reach number one on the chart. In April 1989, X Japan's second album Blue Blood reached number 6 and has sold 712,000 copies. Their third and best-selling album Jealousy was released in July 1991, topped the charts and sold over 1 million copies. They released two more number one studio albums, Art of Life (1993) and Dahlia (1996), before disbanding in 1997. X Japan actually signed an American record deal with Atlantic Records in 1992, but an international release never happened.

"Kurenai"
Sample of X Japan's 1989 version of "Kurenai".

In the eighties few heavy metal bands had female members, like all-female band Show-Ya and Terra Rosa with Kazue Akao on vocals, both formed in 1982. Heavy metal solo artist Mari Hamada, who released material produced by Loudness drummer Munetaka Higuchi, also saw popularity. In September 1987, Show-Ya organized, produced and presented the first Naon no Yaon rock festival, featuring strictly all-female Japanese musicians and bands.

Ezo's two studio albums, the self-titled EZO (1987) and Fire Fire (1989) were released in America by Geffen Records, with the first produced by Gene Simmons. Dead End had their albums Ghost of Romance (1987) and Shambara (1988) released in the United States by Metal Blade Records.

=== Extreme metal ===
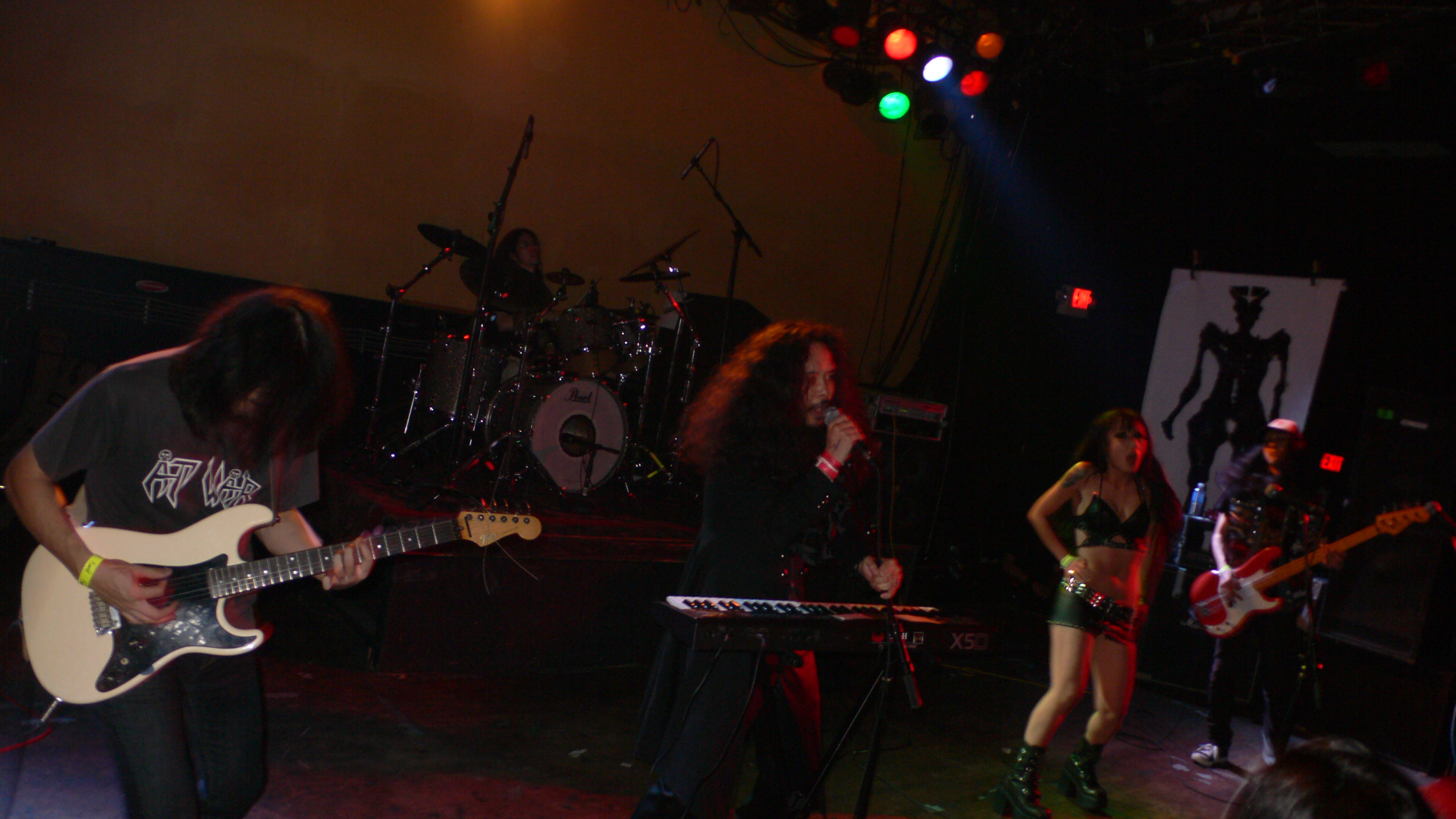
Notable black metal band Sigh

The 1980s also saw Japan's first extreme metal bands. The first thrash metal bands formed in the early 1980s. United, who formed in 1981 as a straightforward heavy metal band before adopting thrash, later incorporated death metal elements as well. United's first international performance took place in Los Angeles at the metal festival Foundations Forum in 1995 and they had a few albums released in North America. Other thrash metal bands include Outrage (1982) and Aion (1983). Formed in 1985, Doom played a gig in the United States in 1988 at CBGB.

Sabbat (1983) and Bellzlleb (1985), whose original lineup included female vocalist Atsuko Koizumi, both formed concurrent with the first wave of black metal. Another notable act is Sigh, whose debut album Scorn Defeat (1993) was released by Deathlike Silence Records, founded by Euronymous of infamous Norwegian band Mayhem.

== 1990s and 2000s ==
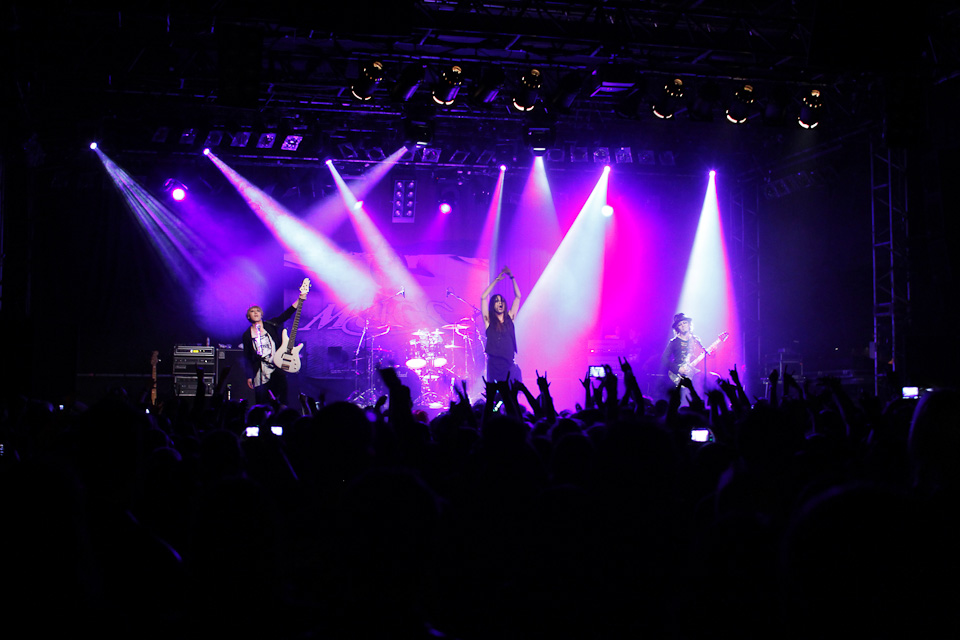
Mucc were one of many visual kei metal acts to pursue international activities in the 2000s.

Ryutaro Hokari of OK Music credited Siam Shade, who were active throughout the 1990s, and their innate melodic sensibility for helping hard rock and heavy metal music penetrate the Japanese mainstream.

Notable doom metal acts including Boris and Church of Misery, both of whom have gained exposure outside Japan, formed in the 1990s. Bands with influence from nu metal also began to form such as Rize (1997), Maximum the Hormone (1998) and Head Phones President (1999). The late 1990s and early to mid-2000s saw many veteran acts reunite with classic line-ups; Lazy (1998), Bow Wow (1998), Earthshaker (1999), Loudness (2001), 44Magnum (2002), Show-Ya (2005) and X Japan (2007).

In the 2000s, many visual kei metal bands prospered and pursued activities overseas, such as D'espairsRay, Mucc, Dir En Grey, Moi dix Mois and Nightmare. D'espairs Ray and Mucc both entered the European market in 2005 and the United States in 2006.

Likewise, Dir En Grey also entered the European market in 2005 with concerts in Berlin and Paris and a release of Withering to Death.. The band and album visited the US the following year, which saw them join Korn's Family Values Tour 2006. All of Dir En Grey's subsequent albums have placed on several Billboard charts, the highest being Uroboros topping the Top Heatseekers chart in 2008.

"Hageshisa to, Kono Mune no Naka de Karamitsuita Shakunetsu no Yami"
Sample of Dir En Grey's 2009 single "Hageshisa to, Kono Mune no Naka de Karamitsuita Shakunetsu no Yami".

In 2007, X Japan drummer Yoshiki organized the J-Rock Revolution event with Warped Tour founder Kevin Lyman, which saw metal acts D'espairsRay and Girugamesh perform in Los Angeles among others. That same year, Yoshiki and Mirai Kawashima of Sigh participated in the Canadian documentary Global Metal, discussing the metal scene in Japan. The 2008 Taste of Chaos tour took Mucc, D'espairs Ray and the Underneath to more than forty cities across the United States and Canada. Coldrain is a metalcore and post-hardcore band that has experimented with heavy metal occasionally, who write all of their music in English.

Symphonic power metal band Versailles gained a significant worldwide following soon after forming as their debut EP Lyrical Sympathy (2007) received a simultaneous European release and they performed in Europe and the United States the following year. Their first full-length album, Noble released in 2008, was also released in North America in 2009. 2011 saw Versailles starring in their own television show.

Loudness has re-entered overseas since 2010, and Galneryus, a power metal band that has been major active since 2003, toured Europe for the first time in July 2014.

== 2010s and 2020s ==
The decade saw a "Girls Metal Band Boom" (ガールズ・メタル・バンド・ブーム), with a large number of all-female heavy metal bands forming and gaining mainstream attention. Although considered pioneers as the first to form in 2007, Destrose never achieved commercial success. Aldious have been cited as the initiators of the movement when their first album Deep Exceed (2010) topped the Oricon Indies Albums Chart and reached number 15 on the main chart. Another notable girls metal band is Cyntia, who are believed to have been the first of the movement to join a major record label when they signed to Victor Entertainment in 2013.

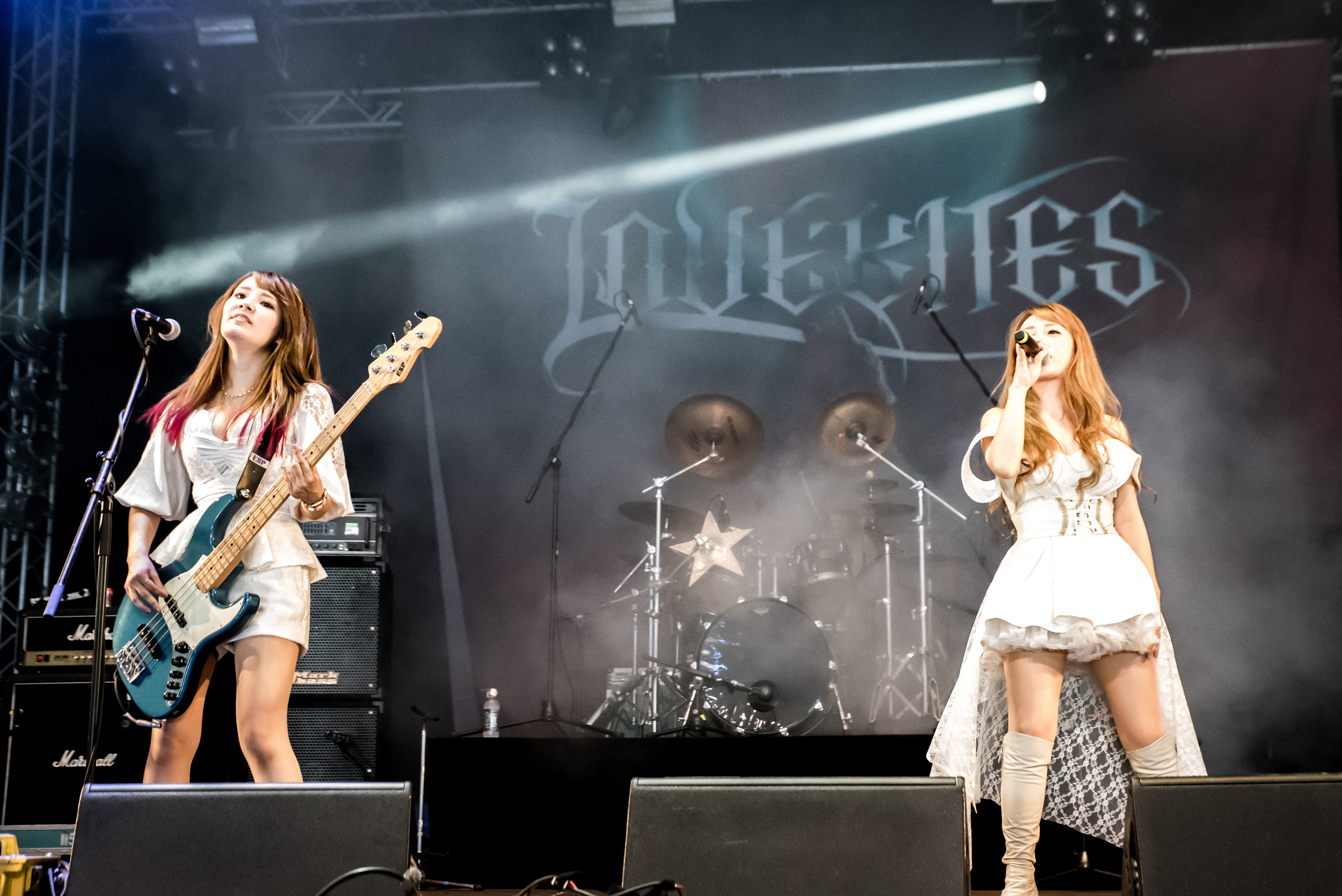
All-female metal band Lovebites often perform international activities in the UK and Europe.

The year 2014 brought the international success of self-described "kawaii metal" idol act Babymetal, through the viral YouTube hit "Gimme Chocolate!!". They were the opening act to five of Lady Gaga's concerts on her ArtRave: The Artpop Ball 2014 tour. In 2016, Babymetal began a world tour at London's Wembley Arena, becoming the first Japanese act to headline the venue, and their album Metal Resistance reached number 15 on the UK Albums Chart, marking the highest ever entry by a Japanese act. They also made their US television debut by performing "Gimme Chocolate!!" on The Late Show with Stephen Colbert.

Band-Maid earned worldwide attention c. 2015 for their "submissive" maid appearance contrasting with their aggressive music. They began international activities the following year, including signing to JPU Records. In 2018, Lovebites won the Metal Hammer Golden Gods Award for Best New Band and became the first Japanese all-female heavy metal band to perform at Germany's Wacken Open Air. On October 4–5, 2019, the O2 Academy Islington in London hosted Metal Matsuri, the first all-Japanese heavy metal festival outside Japan. Headlined by Mary's Blood and Unlucky Morpheus, the two day event featured ten acts total including Bridear, Fate Gear and Blood Stain Child.

In June 2020, "kawaii metal" idol act Passcode's single "Starry Sky" topped the Oricon Singles Chart. In 2022, SiM's song "The Rumbling" topped the US Hot Hard Rock Songs chart, and the album Oceans by British-based Japanese solo act Esprit D'Air reached number 13 on the UK Albums Chart. In 2022, Sable Hills became the first Japanese band to win Wacken Open Air's Metal Battle competition. A different Japanese act won the following year's contest, when Phantom Excaliver took first place in the 2023 Wacken Open Air Metal Battle.

In 2024, self-described "harajuku-core" band Hanabie. became the first Japanese band since X Japan, as well as the first all-female Japanese band, to perform on the main stage at Lollapalooza.
