= On the Prowl (Loudness album) =

Studio album by Loudness
- Released: February 25, 1991
- Recorded: 1990
- Studio: Long View Farm Studios, North Brookfield, Massachusetts, Hollywood Sound Recorders, Los Angeles, California, US
- Genre: Heavy metal, glam metal
- Length: 51:14
- Label: Atco, WEA Japan
- Producer: Loudness, Mark Dearnley, Tokugen Yamamoto

Loudness chronology
Soldier of Fortune (1989)	On the Prowl (1991)	Loudness (1992)

Singles from On the Prowl
- 1. "In the Mirror" / "Sleepless Nights" Released: April 25, 1991

Professional ratings
Review scores
Source	Rating
AllMusic	2/5 stars
Collector's Guide to Heavy Metal	7/10

On the Prowl is the ninth studio album released by the Japanese heavy metal band Loudness. It is also their second and last album with American vocalist Michael Vescera, before he left to join Yngwie Malmsteen's band. On the Prowl is mainly a compilation of self-covers of songs from early Loudness' albums, containing only three new songs written by the band. However, Mike Vescera translated and adapted the lyrics of the old songs written by former vocalist Minoru Niihara, to be sung in English.

== Track listing ==
All lyrics are written by Minoru Niihara, except where noted; all music is composed by Akira Takasaki

Side one
No.	Title	Lyrics	Length
1.	"Down 'n' Dirty"	Michael Vescera	4:36
2.	"Playin' Games"	Vescera	3:47
3.	"Love Toys"	Vescera; Mark Dearnley	4:02
4.	"Never Again (Note: Cover of "Silent Sword", the B-side of the single "Risky Woman")"		5:01
5.	"Deadly Player (Note: Cover of "Lonely Player", from the album Devil Soldier)"		4:47
6.	"Take It or Leave It (Note: Cover of "Milky Way", from the album Disillusion)"		4:31

Side two
No.	Title	Lyrics	Length
1.	"Girl (Note: Cover of the song from the album Devil Soldier)"		4:20
2.	"Long Distance (Note: Cover of "Long Distance Love", from the EP Jealousy)"		4:15
3.	"In the Mirror (Note: Cover of the song from the album The Law of Devil's Land)"		3:34
4.	"Sleepless Nights (Note: Cover of the song from the album The Law of Devil's Land)"		4:39
5.	"Find a Way (Note: Cover of "To Be Demon", from the album The Birthday Eve)"	Vescera	7:31

== Personnel ==
Loudness

- Michael Vescera - vocals
- Akira Takasaki - guitars
- Masayoshi Yamashita - bass
- Munetaka Higuchi - drums

Additional musicians

- Jim Wilkas - keyboards
- Nat, Gary and Chris Vescera, Marty Earley - backing vocals

Production

- Mark Dearnley - producer, engineer, mixing at Capitol Studios, Los Angeles
- Charles Paakkari, Chris Rich, Jesse Henderson - assistant engineers
- Bob Ludwig - mastering
- George Azuma - supervisor
- Tokugen Yamamoto - executive producer
