= Eurobounds =

1984 live album by Loudness

- Cover of the original VHS

Video by Loudness
- Released: 1984
- Recorded: England, Holland, Belgium, West Germany, April–May 1984
- Genre: Heavy metal
- Label: Nippon Columbia
- Director: Jun-Ichi Oh-Iwa
- Producer: Toshiki Nakashita, Masayuki Miyashita, Hideoaki Tsushima, Masakaru Takayama

Loudness video chronology
Live-Loud-Alive: Loudness in Tokyo (1983)	Eurobounds (1984)	Live in Tokio - Lightning Strikes (1986)

DVD cover

Eurobounds

Live album by Loudness
- Released: December 21, 2000
- Genre: Heavy metal
- Length: 38:34
- Label: Nippon Columbia
- Producer: Toshiki Nakashita, Eiichi Yamakawa

Loudness chronology
Engine (1999)	Eurobounds (2000)	Spiritual Canoe (2001)

Eurobounds is the second home video released by the Japanese heavy metal band Loudness. It was released on BETA, VHS, Laserdisc and VHD formats in 1984. This release documented the first European tour of the band, with footage from concerts in England, Holland, Belgium and West Germany. Columbia Records remastered the video and re-released it in DVD format in 2000. A live album with the sound track of the DVD was also released in 2000, with the same cover art of the DVD.

== CD track listing ==
All tracks by Minoru Niihara & Akira Takasaki

1. "Crazy Doctor" – 4:17
2. "Lonely Player" – 5:02
3. "Milky Way" – 4:20
4. "Dream Fantasy" – 4:43
5. "In The Mirror" – 3:49
6. "Esper" – 4:24
7. "Speed" – 7:28
8. "Loudness" – 4:31

== Personnel ==
Loudness

- Minoru Niihara - vocals
- Masayoshi Yamashita - bass
- Munetaka Higuchi - drums
- Akira Takasaki - guitars
