= Eve to Dawn =

Studio album by Loudness
- Released: September 14, 2011
- Recorded: December 2010–August 2011
- Studio: Osaka School of Music, Japan
- Genre: Heavy metal, progressive metal
- Length: 53:49
- Label: Tokuma Japan
- Producer: Loudness, Masahiro Shinoki, Shunji Inoue

Loudness chronology
King of Pain (2010)	Eve to Dawn (2011)	2･0･1･2 (2012)

Eve to Dawn (旭日昇天, Kyokujitsu shōten) is the twenty-fourth studio album by Japanese heavy metal band Loudness, released on September 14, 2011. The album reached number 36 on the Oricon chart.

In an interview, guitarist Akira Takasaki described the album as more "aggressive" than King of Pain, saying that the previous album had been focused on featuring drummer Masayuki Suzuki, but that Eve to Dawn would be guitar-driven. Singer Minoru Niihara said that the lyrics have a more positive vibe than in previous releases because of the impact of the Great East Japan earthquake; the instrumental "A Light in the Dark" was dedicated by Takasaki to that tragic event.

The album's title, Eve to Dawn, is explained as such: "Eve" refers to Loudness' celebrating the 30th anniversary of their debut album, The Birthday Eve, as well as to the late Munetaka Higuchi's birthday, which was on Christmas Eve. "Dawn" indicates a new start towards the world but also alludes to Japan's identity as the Land of the Rising Sun.

== Track listing ==
All lyrics by Minoru Niihara, English lyrics co-written by Takashi Kanazawa. All music by Akira Takasaki, except track 4 by Masayuki Suzuki and track 5 by Masayoshi Yamashita.

1. "A Light in the Dark" (instrumental) - 1:46
2. "The Power of Truth" - 5:27
3. "Come Alive Again" - 4:25
4. "Survivor" - 5:44
5. "Keep You Burning" - 5:16
6. "Gonna Do It My Way" - 4:12
7. "Hang Tough" - 5:54
8. "Kidoairaku" (喜怒哀楽) (instrumental) - 6:21
9. "Comes the Dawn" - 7:04
10. "Pandora" - 4:17
11. "Crazy! Crazy! Crazy!" - 3:23

== Personnel ==
Loudness

- Minoru Niihara – vocals
- Akira Takasaki – guitars, keyboards, vocals on track 5
- Masayoshi Yamashita – bass
- Masayuki Suzuki – drums

Production

- Masatoshi Sakimoto – engineer, mixing at Freedom Studio, Tokyo
- Takeru Maeyama, Takuya Wada – assistant engineers
- Manfred Melchior – mastering at MM Sound, Steinhagen, Germany
- Hirose Shiraishi – supervisor
- Masahiro Shinoki, Shunji Inoue – executive producers
