= Live-Loud-Alive: Loudness in Tokyo =

1983 live album by Loudness

Live album by Loudness
- Released: November 21, 1983
- Recorded: September 24, 1983
- Venue: Nakano Sun Plaza, Tokyo, Japan
- Genre: Heavy metal
- Length: 75:25
- Language: Japanese
- Label: Nippon Columbia
- Producer: Loudness, Mikio Shimizu, Toshi Nakashita

Loudness chronology
The Law of Devil's Land (1983)	Live-Loud-Alive: Loudness in Tokyo (1983)	Disillusion (1984)

Live-Loud-Alive: Loudness in Tokyo
- Cover of the remastered DVD

Video by Loudness
- Released: December 21, 1983
- Recorded: November 2, 1983
- Venue: Shibuya Kokaido, Tokyo, Japan
- Genre: Heavy metal
- Length: 60:00
- Label: Columbia
- Producer: Masayoshi Kubo, Masaharu Takayama, Toshi Nakashita, Masayuki Miyashita

Loudness video chronology
Live-Loud-Alive: Loudness in Tokyo (1983)	Eurobounds (1984)

Professional ratings
Review scores
Source	Rating
AllMusic	3/5 stars

Live-Loud-Alive: Loudness in Tokyo is the first live album by the Japanese band Loudness. It was recorded and released in 1983. The instrumental track "Tusk of Jaguar" appears on Akira Takasaki's first solo album with the same name. The opening theme is taken from "The Planets" by Gustav Holst, performed by the Orchestre National de l'Opera de Montecarlo, conducted by Antonio de Almeida. The home video release of another concert of the same tour was released as the band's first live VHS/Beta and Laserdisc at almost the same time of the double LP and with the same title. The video was remastered and re-released in DVD in 2005.

== Track listing ==
=== Double LP ===
Side one

1. "Opening Theme - Mars the Bringer of War" - 2:24
2. "In the Mirror" - 3:44
3. "Road Racer" - 4:27
4. "I Was the Sun" - 4:12
5. "Fly Away" - 3:30

Side two

6. "Black Wall" - 5:20
7. "Tusk of Jaguar" - 3:13
8. "Drum Solo" - 4:22
9. "Mr. Yesman" - 6:59

Side three

1. "Exploder" - 3:30
2. "Heavenward" - 2:29
3. "Loudness" - 5:20
4. "Sleepless Night" - 7:50

Side four

5. "Speed" - 5:41
6. "Shinkiro" - 4:00
7. "Burning Love" - 5:38
8. "Ending Theme - Theme of Loudness II"

=== VHS and DVD ===
1. "Opening - Theme of Loudness II"
2. "In the Mirror"
3. "Lonely Player"
4. "Angel Dust"
5. "Drum Solo"
6. "Exploder - Heavenward"
7. "Loudness"
8. "Sleepless Night"
9. "Speed"
10. "Road Racer"
11. "Sexy Woman"
12. "Burning Love"
13. "Ending - Far from the Mother Land"

== Personnel ==
Loudness

- Minoru Niihara - vocals
- Akira Takasaki - guitars, backing vocals
- Masayoshi Yamashita - bass, Taurus pedals, backing vocals
- Munetaka Higuchi - drums

LP production

- Masahiro Miyazawa - engineer, mixing
- Teruo Tanaka, Yuzo Toki - assistant engineers
- Hiroyuki Munekiyo - coordinator
- Mikio Shimizu, Toshi Nakashita - executive producers

VHS production

- Masayoshi Kubo, Masaharu Takayama - producers
- Toshi Nakashita, Masayuki Miyashita - executive producers

== See also ==
- 1983 in Japanese music
