= Rise to Glory =

Studio album by Loudness
- Released: January 26, 2018
- Genre: Heavy metal
- Length: 55:06
- Label: Ward Records (Japan) earMUSIC (International)
- Producer: Loudness

Loudness chronology
The Sun Will Rise Again (2014)	Rise to Glory (2018)	Sunburst (2021)

Rise to Glory -8118- is the twenty-seventh studio album by Japanese heavy metal band Loudness. It was released in Japan through Ward Records and in the US and Europe through earMUSIC. It was their first album released in the US since 1991's On the Prowl and their first in Europe since 2004's Racing. All international editions contained their previous album of self-covers, Samsara Flight, as a bonus disc, much like how the international version of Racing contained RockShocks (also a self-cover album) as a bonus disc.

The first press edition in Japan contained a DVD featuring a special 35th anniversary show.

The album debuted at number 13 on the Oricon weekly albums chart and at number 18 on the Billboard Japan Hot Albums Chart.

== Critical reception ==
Professional ratings
Review scores
Source	Rating
Blabbermouth.net	6.5/10
Cryptic Rock	4/5 stars
Maximum Metal	2.5/5 stars
Metal Nation	8/10
Myglobalmind	9/10

The album received mixed-to-positive reviews from music critics. Positive reviews praised the album's energy and raw sound, with Vito Tanzi of Cryptic Rock stating, "In high gear, 'I’m Still Alive' is a heavy, yet speedy track that really delivers the raw energy of the band at their best. Loaded with substance, 'Go for Broke' hits the spot with a simple riff, coveting the underlying fundamentals in the heart of a great rock tune." Reviewers also praised Akira Takasaki's guitar playing, with Chris Martin of Myglobalmind saying, "The first thing that struck me upon hearing this album for the first time was the fact that guitar guru Akira Takasaki is writing some of the most catchy riffs he’s composed since the 80’s. Almost veering away from his turbocharged and experimental stuff, Takasaki seems to be returning to a more meat and potatoes guitar style." More mixed reviews noted that the band sounded a bit jaded and were trying too hard to cling to their old sound, with Ray Van Horn, Jr. of Blabbermouth.net saying, "The globby keyboards on the opening instrumental '8118' are goofy and not much of a set-up to the pedestrian 'Soul on Fire.' With no intended disrespect, Loudness sounds wrung out on this number as it clings to the hope that a melodic retro rocker is the way to go. It's heavier than the group's late eighties output, but not by much. A good bass line from Masayoshi Yamashita and Akira Takasaki's scruffy guitar solo provides the song's steam, but it's hardly the heat-seeker it wants to be." He also noted that the band seemed to struggle to balance different styles on the album, saying, "This band has been admired for such a long time that it's painful to hear it struggle between two identities: the fast and flashy Loudness, which still has muscle, and the pop-minded Loudness, which works incrementally at best. 'Why and for Whom,' a hearty power metal ripper, posits a peculiar question, since Loudness still fields a respectable sales presence in Japan. They have to seethe in wonderment how Babymetal managed to breach that fine line between aggression and pop which has tormented Loudness for its entire career."

== Track listing ==
All lyrics are written by Minoru Niihara; all music is composed by Akira Takasaki.

Rise to Glory track listing
No.	Title	Length
1.	"8118" (Instrumental)	1:49
2.	"Soul on Fire"	5:50
3.	"I'm Still Alive"	3:18
4.	"Go for Broke"	4:55
5.	"Until I See the Light"	4:43
6.	"The Voice"	4:31
7.	"Massive Tornado"	4:56
8.	"Kama Sutra" (Instrumental)	3:19
9.	"Rise to Glory"	4:17
10.	"Why and for Whom"	6:00
11.	"No Limits"	5:09
12.	"Rain"	6:19
Total length:		55:06

Japan first press edition
No.	Title	Length
13.	"Bad Loser" (Bonus track)	3:57
Total length:		59:03

International edition
No.	Title	Length
13.	"Let's All Rock" (Bonus track)	6:00
Total length:		61:06

DVD: 2016.12.30 35th Anniversary Year Special Live Fan's Best Selection ~We are the Loudness~
No.	Title	Length
1.	"Ghetto Machine"
2.	"Milky Way"
3.	"Metal Mad"
4.	"The Sun Will Rise Again"
5.	"Let It Go"
6.	"Speed"
7.	"Slaughter House"
8.	"Ares' Lament"
9.	"Like Hell"
10.	"Gotta Fight"
11.	"Loudness"
12.	"Soldier of Fortune"
13.	"Dream Fantasy"
14.	"S.D.I."
15.	"In the Mirror"
16.	"Crazy Nights"
17.	"Crazy Doctor"

== Charts ==
Chart (2018)	Peak position
Japanese Albums (Oricon)	13
Japanese Hot Albums (Billboard Japan)	18
