= Pandemonium (Loudness album) =

Studio album by Loudness
- Released: November 21, 2001
- Studio: Little Bach Kobuchizawa, Victor Aoyama Studio, Folio Sound, Freedom Studio, Tokyo, Japan, Landmark Studio, Yokohama, Japan
- Genre: Groove metal, nu metal
- Length: 55:41
- Label: Nippon Columbia
- Producer: Loudness, Takafumi Yamada, Chiyomi Shibata, Eiichi Yamakawa

Loudness chronology
The Soldier's Just Came Back (2001)	Pandemonium (2001)	Biosphere (2002)

Pandemonium (降臨幻術, Kōrin genjutsu) is the sixteenth studio album by Japanese heavy metal band Loudness. It was released in 2001 only in Japan. All music is credited to Loudness and all lyrics to Niihara.

== Track listing ==
1. "Ya Stepped on a Mine" - 3:44
2. "Bloody Doom" - 5:56
3. "The Pandemonium" - 4:34
4. "Vision" - 4:57
5. "What's the Truth?" - 4:08
6. "Suicide Doll" - 6:45
7. "Chaos" - 4:47
8. "The Candidate" - 5:09
9. "Real Man" - 6:04
10. "Inflame" - 4:41
11. "Snake Venom" - 4:56

== Personnel ==
Loudness

- Minoru Niihara - vocals
- Akira Takasaki - guitars
- Masayoshi Yamashita - bass
- Munetaka Higuchi - drums

Production

- Takafumi Yamada - co-producer
- Masatoshi Sakimoto - engineer, mixing
- Kenichi Nakamura, Nobuko Shimura, Shinichi Naitō, Tadashi Hashimoto, Yukiko Matsushita - assistant engineers
- Seigen Ono - mastering
- Chiyomi Shibata, Eiichi Yamakawa - executive producers
- Shannon Higgins, Bob Dyer, John Fotos - lyrics translations
- John Fotos - lyrics translations & vocal recording English language advisor
