= Soldier of Fortune (Loudness album) =

Studio album by Loudness
- Released: September 17, 1989
- Studio: The Village Recorder, Los Angeles; Studio 56, Los Angeles; Quantum Sound Studios, New Jersey; Skip Saylor Studios, Hollywood; Gold Rush Studio, Tokyo
- Genre: Heavy metal, glam metal
- Length: 45:29
- Label: ATCO, WEA Japan
- Producer: Max Norman, Roger Probert

Loudness chronology
Jealousy (1988)	Soldier of Fortune (1989)	On the Prowl (1991)

Singles from Soldier of Fortune
- 1. "You Shook Me" / "Faces in the Fire" Released: 1989

Professional ratings
Review scores
Source	Rating
AllMusic	4/5 stars
Collector's Guide to Heavy Metal	7/10

Soldier of Fortune is the eighth studio album by Japanese heavy metal band Loudness, and their first with American vocalist Mike Vescera. It is the band's third album produced by Max Norman after Thunder in the East in 1985 and Lightning Strikes in 1986. The album is co-produced by Fates Warning's producer Roger Probert. Despite the good critical reception and the strong support given by the label, the album failed to chart in the US. The CD contains heavy and fast tracks like "Soldier of Fortune", "You Shook Me", "Red Light Shooter", "Running for Cover", "Faces in the Fire" and "Demon Disease".

A music video for the song "You Shook Me" was made, where the band can be affected by playing at the foot of the famous Hollywood peak, which falls apart specifically before the same sound force.

== Track listing ==
All lyrics are written by Loudness; all music is composed by Akira Takasaki.

Side one
No.	Title	Length
1.	"Soldier of Fortune"	3:55
2.	"You Shook Me"	4:42
3.	"Danger of Love"	5:02
4.	"Twenty-Five Days"	4:22
5.	"Red Light Shooter"	4:50

Side two
No.	Title	Length
1.	"Running for Cover"	4:21
2.	"Lost Without Your Love"	4:56
3.	"Faces in the Fire"	4:08
4.	"Long After Midnight"	4:38
5.	"Demon Disease"	4:34

== Personnel ==
Loudness

- Michael Vescera – vocals
- Akira Takasaki – guitars
- Masayoshi Yamashita – bass
- Munetaka Higuchi – drums

Additional musicians

- Claude Schnell – keyboards

Production

- Max Norman – producer, mixing
- Roger Probert – producer
- Bill Freesh – engineer
- Charlie Brocco, Steve Sisco, Dave Carpenter, Joe Barresi, Pat MacDougall, Masanori Ihara – assistant engineers
- Chris Bellman – mastering

== See also ==
- 1989 in Japanese music
