= Heavy Metal Hippies =

Studio album by Loudness
- Released: December 21, 1994
- Studio: Music Inn Yamanakako Studio, Yamanakako, Yamanashi, Japan
- Genre: Alternative metal, grunge, hard rock
- Length: 56:45
- Label: Warner Music Japan
- Producer: Akira Takasaki

Loudness chronology
Once and for All (1993)	Heavy Metal Hippies (1994)	Loud 'n' Raw (1995)

Singles from Heavy Metal Hippies
- 1. "Electric Kisses" Released: December 10, 1994

Professional ratings
Review scores
Source	Rating
AllMusic	1.5/5 stars

Heavy Metal Hippies is the eleventh studio album by Japanese heavy metal band Loudness. It was recorded and mixed by Chris Tsangarides and released in 1994 only in Japan. After the defection of bassist Taiji Sawada, Akira Takasaki played both the lines of bass and guitar on the album. In addition, drummer and band co-founder Munetaka Higuchi was replaced by Hirotsugu Homma.

== Track listing ==
All music by Akira Takasaki. Lyrics by Masaki Yamada, Stephan Galfas and Kayla Ritt Yamada

1. "Howling Rain" - 6:59
2. "Freedom" - 7:13
3. "222" (instrumental) - 2:37
4. "Eyes of a Child" - 6:34
5. "Electric Kisses" - 4:55
6. "House of Freaks" - 5:03
7. "Paralyzed" - 5:16
8. "Desperation Desecration" - 5:35
9. "Light in the Distance" - 4:56
10. "Broken Jesus" - 7:37

== Personnel ==
Loudness

- Masaki Yamada - lead and backing vocals
- Akira Takasaki - guitars, bass, sound effects, producer
- Hirotsugu Homma - drums

Production

- Chris Tsangarides - engineer, mixing, sound effects
- Stephan Galfas - vocal production, backing vocals
- Shinichi Naito - assistant engineer
- Bobby Hata - mastering
