= Thunder in the East (album) =

Studio album by Loudness
- Released: 21 January 1985
- Recorded: September–October 1984
- Studios: Sound City Studios, Los Angeles, California, U.S.
- Genres: Heavy metal; glam metal
- Length: 41:35
- Labels: Nippon Columbia (Japan); ATCO (U.S.); Music for Nations / Roadrunner (Europe)
- Producers: Max Norman; Paul Cooper

Loudness chronology
Odin EP (1985)	Thunder in the East (1985)	Lightning Strikes (1986)

Singles from Thunder in the East
- 1. "Crazy Nights" / "Like Hell" Released: 1 December 1984 (Japan) 1 November 1985 (US)

Japanese edition cover

Professional ratings
Review scores
Source	Rating
AllMusic	2.5/5 stars
Collector's Guide to Heavy Metal	7/10

Thunder in the East is the fifth studio album by Japanese heavy metal band Loudness, and the first released by a major American label after the contract signed with Atco Records, then a subsidiary of Atlantic Records. Aside from being the band's first all-English release, it is the first Loudness album produced by Max Norman, best known for his previous work with Ozzy Osbourne, who also produced Lightning Strikes in 1986 and Soldier of Fortune in 1989. Thunder in the East features the single "Crazy Nights", the band's biggest hit in America, and the power ballad "Never Change Your Mind". This album marked the first time a Japanese band entered the US Top 100 chart, where it remained for 23 weeks, peaking at No. 74. In 2018, readers and professional musicians voted Thunder in the East the third best album in the history of hard rock and heavy metal in We Rock magazine's "Metal General Election".

The album cover introduced the band's signature logo, which would be used in majority of their discography. The Rising Sun background would also be used in the band's albums Breaking the Taboo and The Sun Will Rise Again. The 2005 remastered version includes the bonus tracks "Gotta Fight" and "Odin", which were originally released as singles for the 1985 anime film Odin: Photon Sailer Starlight.

The chant of "M-Z-A!" featured in the single "Crazy Nights" came about when producer Norman asked lead vocalist Niihara to come up with something to sing over the main riff between the chorus and next verse. "M-Z-A!" means nothing, and it was intended to be replaced with another line in post-production. When Niihara could not come up with anything to replace it, the "M-Z-A!" chant survived.

On November 25, 2015, the album received a 30th anniversary boxset reissue exclusively in Japan through Nippon Columbia.

In 2017, the album was re-released on limited edition red vinyl.

== Track listing ==
All lyrics are written by Minoru Niihara; all music is composed by Akira Takasaki, except "Heavy Chains" by Masayoshi Yamashita".

Side one
No.	Title	Length
1.	"Crazy Nights"	4:04
2.	"Like Hell"	3:44
3.	"Heavy Chains"	4:18
4.	"Get Away"	3:53
5.	"We Could Be Together"	4:35
Total length:		20:34

Side two
No.	Title	Length
1.	"Run for Your Life"	3:59
2.	"Clockwork Toy"	3:55
3.	"No Way Out"	4:01
4.	"The Lines Are Down"	4:57
5.	"Never Change Your Mind"	4:09
Total length:		21:01

2005 remastered CD edition bonus tracks
No.	Title	Length
11.	"Gotta Fight"	3:46
12.	"Odin"	5:16

2015 30th Anniversary Edition bonus tracks
No.	Title	Length
11.	"Crazy Nights" (Unreleased Demo M4)
12.	"We Could Be Together" (Unreleased Demo M2)

2015 30th Anniversary Edition DVD 1
No.	Title	Length
1.	"DVD Documentary"	2:05:00

2015 30th Anniversary Edition DVD 2
No.	Title	Length
1.	"Thunder in the East 1985 U.S. Tour Live"	1:34:00

== Personnel ==
Band members

- Minoru Niihara – vocals
- Akira Takasaki – guitars
- Masayoshi Yamashita – bass
- Munetaka Higuchi – drums

Production

- Max Norman – producer
- Bill Freesh – engineer
- Ray Leonard – assistant engineer
- Bernie Grundman – mastering
- Paul Cooper – executive producer
- George Azuma – supervisor
- Hiroyuki Munekiyo, Mikio Shimizu – coordinators

== See also ==
- 1985 in Japanese music
