= Jealousy (EP) =

EP by Loudness
- Released: May 25, 1988
- Recorded: Marine Studio, Music Inn Studio, Digital Sound Studio, Sedic Studio, Tokyo, Japan
- Genre: Heavy metal, glam metal
- Length: 27:59
- Language: Japanese / English
- Label: ATCO
- Producer: Loudness, Toshi Makashita

Loudness chronology
| Hurricane Eyes (1987) | Jealousy (1988) | Soldier of Fortune (1989) |

Singles from Jealousy
- 1. "Long Distance Love" / "Good Things Going" Released: May 25, 1988 (Japan only); 2. "Dreamer and Screamer" / "Die of Hunger" Released: May 25, 1989 (Japan only)

Professional ratings
Review scores
| Source | Rating |
|---|---|
| AllMusic | 1.5/5 stars |
| Collector's Guide to Heavy Metal | 5/10 |
| Kerrang! | 4.5/5 stars |

Jealousy is an EP by Japanese heavy metal band Loudness. It was released in May 1988 only in Japan, a market that the band felt to have neglected in favour of American audiences. It would also mark the final recording with the classic line-up, until Spiritual Canoe in 2001. Singer Minoru Niihara left the band after the end of the domestic tour promoting this release. The song "Long Distance Love" would later be reworked for the On the Prowl album, with vocals by American singer Mike Vescera.

== Track listing ==
All music by Akira Takasaki, all lyrics by Minoru Niihara

| No. | Title | Length |
|---|---|---|
| 1. | "Jealousy" | 5:04 |
| 2. | "Long Distance Love" | 4:32 |
| 3. | "Good Things Going" | 5:09 |
| 4. | "Die of Hunger" | 4:48 |
| 5. | "Heavier than Hell" | 4:29 |
| 6. | "Dreamer and Screamer" | 3:55 |

=== 30th Anniversary Edition ===
| No. | Title | Length |
|---|---|---|
| 7. | "Dreamer and Screamer (Demo)" | 2:55 |
| 8. | "Die of Hunger (Instrumental Demo)" | 4:32 |
| 9. | "Dreamer and Screamer (Instrumental Demo)" | 3:10 |
| 10. | "Good Things Going (Instrumental Demo)" | 5:18 |
| 11. | "Heavier than Hell (Instrumental Demo)" | 4:15 |
| 12. | "Jealousy (Instrumental Demo)" | 5:03 |
| 13. | "Running for Cover (Demo)" | 3:37 |
| 14. | "Shake (Instrumental Demo)" | 3:06 |
| 15. | "Die of Hunger (Rhythm Recording)" | 4:41 |
| 16. | "Heavier than Hell (Rhythm Recording)" | 4:09 |
| 17. | "Jealousy (Rhythm Recording)" | 5:07 |
| 18. | "Long Distance Love (Rhythm Recording)" | 4:50 |
| 19. | "Danger of Love (Demo)" | 4:41 |
| 20. | "Friday (Demo)" | 1:35 |
| 21. | "You Shook Me (Demo)" | 4:22 |
| 22. | "Demon Disease (Demo)" | 5:09 |

== Personnel ==
Loudness

- Minoru Niihara - vocals
- Akira Takasaki - guitars
- Masayoshi Yamashita - bass
- Munetaka Higuchi - drums

Additional musicians

- Masanori Sasaji - keyboards
- Jesus Kogyama, Enky Fujino, Paul Raymond, Frank Dimino - backing vocals

Production

- Bill Freesh - engineer
- Yasuhiro Ito, Hideaki Kojima - assistant engineers
- Toshi Makashita - executive producer

== See also ==
- 1988 in Japanese music
