= Hurricane Eyes =

Studio album by Loudness
- Released: August 10, 1987
- Recorded: March–May 1987
- Studio: Onkio Haus, Sedic Studios and Warner-Pioneer Studio, Tokyo, Japan, Sound City, Encore & Yamaha Studios, Can-Am Recorders, Los Angeles, Bearsville Studios, Bearsville, New York, USA
- Genre: Heavy metal, glam metal
- Length: 41:45
- Language: English; Japanese
- Label: ATCO; WEA Japan
- Producer: Eddie Kramer, Andy Johns, Toshi Nakashita

Loudness chronology
8186 Live (1986)	Hurricane Eyes (1987)	Jealousy (1988)

Singles from Hurricane Eyes
- 1. "So Lonely" / "Strike of the Sword" Released: November 28, 1987 (Japan only)

Japanese version cover

Professional ratings
Review scores
Source	Rating
AllMusic	1.5/5 stars

Hurricane Eyes is the seventh studio album by Japanese heavy metal band Loudness. It was released in 1987 worldwide with standard English lyrics. A "Japanese Version" was subsequently released only in Japan later in the year with Niihara singing most of the lyrics in Japanese. The album was produced by the famous producer and sound engineer Eddie Kramer, who had worked with the likes of The Rolling Stones, Led Zeppelin, Jimi Hendrix and Kiss. The song "So Lonely", a reprise of "Ares Lament" from the album Disillusion of 1984, was instead produced by Andy Johns, another world-famous producer. This was the last Loudness album to enter the US Billboard 200 chart, where it remained for 4 weeks, peaking at No. 190.

== Track listing ==
=== International release ===
All lyrics are written by Minoru Niihara; all music is composed by Akira Takasaki.

Side one
No.	Title	Length
1.	"S.D.I."	4:15
2.	"This Lonely Heart"	4:08
3.	"Rock 'n' Roll Gypsy"	4:22
4.	"In My Dreams"	4:30
5.	"Take Me Home"	3:16

Side two
No.	Title	Length
1.	"Strike of the Sword"	3:50
2.	"Rock This Way"	4:07
3.	"In This World Beyond"	4:26
4.	"Hungry Hunter"	4:08
5.	"So Lonely"	4:43

=== Japanese version ===
Side one
No.	Title	Length
1.	"Strike of the Sword"	3:52
2.	"So Lonely"	4:46
3.	"This Lonely Heart"	4:05
4.	"Hungry Hunter"	4:08
5.	"In This World Beyond"	4:27

Side two
No.	Title	Length
1.	"Take Me Home"	3:18
2.	"Rock 'n' Roll Gypsy"	4:40
3.	"In My Dreams"	4:40
4.	"Rock This Way"	4:07
5.	"S.D.I."	4:21

== Personnel ==
Loudness

- Minoru Niihara – vocals
- Akira Takasaki – guitars
- Masayoshi Yamashita – bass
- Munetaka Higuchi – drums

Additional musicians

- Gregg Giuffria – keyboards
- Steve "Zeus" Johnstad, David Glen Eisley, Tod Howarth – background vocals and assistance with English lyrics

Production

- Eddie Kramer – producer, engineer, mixing
- Tory Swenson – engineer
- Thom Cadley, Hidemi Nakatani, Masashi Goto, Stan Katayama – assistant engineers
- Scott Mabuchi – mixing
- Andy Johns – producer and mixing on "So Lonely"
- Bill Freesh – engineer on "So Lonely"
- Ted Jensen – mastering at Sterling Sound, New York
- Sam Nagashima – coordinator
- Toshi Nakashita – executive producer

== See also ==
- 1987 in Japanese music
