= Max Norman =

British record producer

- Born: United Kingdom
- Genres: Heavy metal; glam metal; hard rock; instrumental rock
- Occupations: Record producer, recording engineer
- Years active: 1973–present

Max Norman is a British record producer and recording engineer active since 1973. He produced many acclaimed heavy metal releases.

While Norman was resident engineer at Ridge Farm Studios in Surrey, England, Ozzy Osbourne was recording his debut solo album Blizzard of Ozz with producer/engineer Chris Tsangarides. After Osbourne and Tsangarides parted ways, Norman was asked to carry on.

Norman appears in the Megadeth home video Evolver, a documentary about the making of Youthanasia.

In early 2017, Norman completed projects with artists Ethan Brosh at Carriage House Studios, Machinage, and Mean Streak.

== Discography ==
=== Production ===
- Ozzy Osbourne - Blizzard of Ozz (1980), Diary of a Madman (1981), Speak of the Devil (1982), Bark at the Moon (1983), Tribute (1987)
- Y&T - Black Tiger (1982)
- Vendetta - Vendetta (1982)
- Ian Hunter - All of the Good Ones Are Taken (1983)
- Coney Hatch - Outta Hand (1983), Friction (1985), Best of Three (1992)
- Ian Thomas - Riders on Dark Horses (1984)
- Bronz - Carried by the Storm (1984)
- Savatage - Power of the Night (1985)
- Grim Reaper - Rock You to Hell (1987)
- Trash - Burnin' Rock (1985)
- Loudness - Thunder in the East (1985), Lightning Strikes (1986), Soldier of Fortune (1989)
- Armored Saint - Delirious Nomad (1985)
- Malice - Licence to Kill (1986)
- Lizzy Borden - Visual Lies (1987)
- Dirty Looks - Cool from the Wire (1988), Five Easy Pieces (1992)
- 220 Volt - Eye to Eye (1988)
- Concrete Jungle - Wear and Tear (1988)
- Roughhouse - Roughhouse (1988)
- Dangerous Toys - Dangerous Toys (1989)
- Voodoo X - Vol. 1 The Awakening (1989)
- Death Angel - Act III (1990)
- John Norum - Face the Truth
- Lynch Mob - Wicked Sensation (1990)
- Megadeth - Countdown to Extinction (1992), Youthanasia (1994), Hidden Treasures (1995)
- Bangalore Choir - On Target (1992)
- Phantom Blue - Built to Perform (1993)
- Mind Bomb - Mind Bomb (1993)
- Choking Ghost - Leveled (1995)
- Sly - Key (1996)
- Machinage - Machinage (2016)
- Ethan Brosh - Ethan Brosh (2016)
- Mean Streak - Blind Faith (2017), Eye of the Storm (2020)

=== Mixing and engineering ===
- The Tubes – What Do You Want from Live (1978)
- Ozzy Osbourne – Blizzard of Ozz (1980)
- Orchestral Manoeuvres in the Dark – Organisation (1980)
- Bad Company – Rough Diamonds (1982)
- Craymore Stevens – Faster Than Snakes (1987)
- Fates Warning – No Exit (1988), Perfect Symmetry (1989)
- Megadeth – Rust in Peace (1990)
- Annihilator – Set the World on Fire (engineer) (1993)
- Dirty Looks – Chewing on the Bit (1994)
- Strung Out – Suburban Teenage Wasteland Blues (1996)
- The Black Symphony – Breathe (1996)
- Red Dragon Cartel – Patina (2018)
- The Watchers – Black Abyss (2018)
- MD45 – The Craving (1996)
