= Loudness (album) =

1992 album by Loudness

- Cover art by Tadanori Yokoo

Studio album by Loudness
- Released: June 10, 1992
- Studio: Music Inn Yamanakako Studio, Yamanakako, Yamanashi, Japan, Studio 900, New York City, United States, Warner Music Japan Studios, Tokyo, Japan
- Genre: Heavy metal, speed metal, groove metal
- Length: 46:57
- Label: Warner Music Japan
- Producer: Akira Takasaki, Jody Gray (vocal production)

Loudness chronology
| On the Prowl (1991) | Loudness (1992) | Once and for All (1993) |

Professional ratings
Review scores
| Source | Rating |
|---|---|
| AllMusic | 2/5 stars |

"Black Widow"

Single by Loudness

from the album Loudness
- A-side: "Black Widow"
- B-side: "Racing the Wind"
- Released: May 25, 1992
- Genre: Heavy metal
- Length: 8:55
- Label: Warner Music Japan
- Songwriter(s): Jody Gray, Akira Takasaki, Masaki Yamada

Loudness singles chronology
| "Sleepless Nights" (1991) | "Black Widow" (1992) | "Slaughter House" (1992) |

"Slaughter House"

Single by Loudness

from the album Loudness
- A-side: "Slaughter House"
- B-side: "House of 1000 Pleasures (live version)"; "S.D.I. (live version)"
- Released: August 25, 1992
- Genre: Heavy metal
- Length: 16:27
- Label: Warner Music Japan
- Songwriter(s): Jody Gray, Akira Takasaki, Masaki Yamada

Loudness singles chronology
| "Black Widow" (1991) | "Slaughter House" (1992) | "Electric Kisses" (1994) |

Loudness is the tenth studio album by Japanese band Loudness. It was released in 1992 only in Japan, after the band had terminated the recording contracts with US labels. Original bass player Masayoshi Yamashita was replaced with former X Japan bassist Taiji Sawada and the American vocalist Mike Vescera with former Ezo singer Masaki Yamada.

The sound of this album is much more aggressive and the rhythms much faster than the preceding offerings from the band. This fact has been interpreted as a reaction by composer and producer Takasaki to the many compromises he had to accept by US managers and producers to remain in the record market in the United States. Also, the music has a much more groove metal sound to it overall, whereas their previous output from the late 80's had a very glam-oriented melodic sound to it.

The cover art is designed by artist Tadanori Yokoo. The limited edition of the album came with a special booklet and CD case, guitar picks, band name logo sticker and a T-shirt signed by the band. The album reached No. 2 in Japan on the Oricon Charts, making it Loudness' highest-charting and best-selling album in Japan. A live album, recorded in 1992, Once and for All, and a live Laserdisc and VHS, Welcome to the Slaughter House, also recorded in 1992 at Nakano Sun Plaza, were also released.

== Track listing ==
All lyrics are written by Masaki Yamada and Jody Gray; all music is composed by Akira Takasaki except "Everyone Lies" by Masayoshi Yamashita.

| No. | Title | Length |
|---|---|---|
| 1. | "Pray for the Dead" | 4:15 |
| 2. | "Slaughter House" | 3:53 |
| 3. | "Waking the Dead" | 3:55 |
| 4. | "Black Widow" | 4:50 |
| 5. | "Racing the Wind" | 4:04 |
| 6. | "Love Kills" | 5:14 |
| 7. | "Hell Bites (From the Edge of Insanity)" | 5:54 |
| 8. | "Everyone Lies" | 4:43 |
| 9. | "Twisted" | 5:20 |
| 10. | "Firestorm" | 4:49 |

== Personnel ==
Loudness

- Masaki Yamada - lead and backing vocals
- Akira Takasaki - guitars, producer
- Taiji Sawada - bass
- Munetaka Higuchi - drums

Additional musicians

- Jody Gray - demon rapper on "Twisted", vocal producer
- Neil Coty, Phil Goodbody - backing vocals

Production

- Eric Westfall, Mark Corbin, Julio Pena, Makoto Furukawa - engineers
- Eiji Ohta, Richard Scott, Takahiro Sakai - assistant engineers
- Scott Mabuchi - mixing
- Makoto Takahashi - mixing assistant
- Tony Dawsey - mastering at Masterdisk, New York

== Charts ==
| Chart (1992) | Peak position |
|---|---|
| Oricon Albums Chart | 2 |
