= The Law of Devil's Land =

Studio album by Loudness
- Released: January 21, 1983
- Studio: Studio Birdman, Nippon Columbia Studio, Tokyo, Japan
- Genre: Heavy metal
- Length: 42:13
- Language: Japanese
- Label: Nippon Columbia (Japan); Roadrunner (Europe)
- Producer: Loudness, Daiko Nagato, Mikio Shimizu

Loudness chronology
Devil Soldier (1982)	The Law of Devil's Land (1983)	Live-Loud-Alive: Loudness in Tokyo (1983)

Professional ratings
Review scores
Source	Rating
AllMusic	4/5 stars
Collector's Guide to Heavy Metal	6/10

The Law of Devil's Land (魔界典章, Makai tenshō) is the third studio album by the Japanese heavy metal band Loudness. It was released in 1983 only in Japan and later distributed in Europe by Roadrunner Records. The CD reissue of 2005 contains two extra songs coming from the English version of the band's third single.

== Track listing ==
All lyrics are written by Minoru Niihara; all music is composed by Akira Takasaki, except where noted

Side one
No.	Title	Length
1.	"Theme of Loudness (Part II)"	1:52
2.	"In the Mirror"	3:41
3.	"Show Me the Way"	6:05
4.	"I Wish You Were Here"	3:45
5.	"Mr. Yes Man"	6:57

Side two
No.	Title	Music	Length
1.	"The Law of Devil's Land"		4:56
2.	"Black Wall"	Masayoshi Yamashita	5:06
3.	"Sleepless Night"		4:48
4.	"Speed"		5:32

2005 CD bonus tracks
No.	Title	Length
10.	"Road Racer"	4:25
11.	"Shinkirō" ((蜃気楼; "Mirage"))	4:01

== Personnel ==
Loudness

- Minoru Niihara - vocals
- Akira Takasaki - guitars
- Masayoshi Yamashita - bass
- Munetaka Higuchi - drums

Additional musicians

- Eve - chorus on track 1

Production

- Daiko Nagato, Mikio Shimizu - producers
- Daniel McClendon - engineer, mixing
- Akira Ohmachi - tape operator
- Kenichi Kishi - label executive
- Keisuke Tsukimitsu - art direction

== See also ==
- 1983 in Japanese music
