= Ghetto Machine =

Studio album by Loudness
- Released: July 7, 1997
- Recorded: Fantasy Studios, Berkeley, California; TML Studios, Hayward, California, USA; February–March 1997; ESP Rehearsal Studio, December 1995 (track 7)
- Genre: Heavy metal, groove metal
- Length: 50:44
- Label: Rooms
- Producer: Akira Takasaki, Masao Nakajima

Loudness chronology
Loud 'n' Raw (1995)	Ghetto Machine (1997)	Dragon (1998)

Ghetto Machine is the twelfth studio album by the Japanese heavy metal band Loudness. It was released in 1997 only in Japan and recorded at the famous Fantasy Studios in Berkeley, California. This was the first album to feature bassist Naoto Shibata. Only the instrumental "Katmandu Fly" was recorded in 1995 at ESP Guitars rehearsal studio.

== Track listing ==
All music by Akira Takasaki. Lyrics by Masaki Yamada, except songs 1,2,3,6 by Yamada and Stephan Galfas and song 4 by Kayla Ritt and Stephan Galfas

1. "Ghetto Machine" - 4:04
2. "Slave" - 3:17
3. "Evil Ecstasy" - 4:10
4. "San Francisco" - 4:10
5. "Love and Hate" - 6:41
6. "Creatures" - 5:30
7. "Katmandu Fly" (instrumental) - 1:14
8. "Hypnotized" - 4:44
9. "Dead Man Walking" - 4:45
10. "Jasmine Sky" - 5:47
11. "Wonder Man" - 5:54

== Personnel ==
Loudness

- Masaki Yamada - vocals
- Akira Takasaki - guitars, producer
- Naoto Shibata - bass
- Hirotsugu Homma - drums

Production

- Daniel McClendon - engineer, mixing
- Steve Fontano, Michael Rosen, Galen T. Berens - engineers
- George Horn - mastering
- George Azuma - supervisor
- Masao Nakajima - executive producer
