= Spiritual Canoe =

Studio album by Loudness
- Released: March 7, 2001
- Studio: ESP Music Studio A and C, Tokyo, Japan
- Genre: Heavy metal, alternative metal, speed metal
- Length: 63:35
- Language: Japanese
- Label: Nippon Columbia
- Producer: Loudness, Toshi Nakashita, Eiichi Yamakawa

Loudness chronology
Engine (1999)	Spiritual Canoe (2001)	The Soldier's Just Came Back (2001)

Spiritual Canoe (輪廻転生, Rin'netenshō) is the fifteenth studio album by Japanese heavy metal band Loudness. It was released in 2001 only in Japan. It also marked the first time since 1988's Jealousy that the original and classic line-up recorded together.

== Track listing ==
All music by Akira Takasaki, Minoru Niihara, Munetaka Higuchi and Masayoshi Yamashita, except for "Spiritual Canoe" by Takasaki. Lyrics by Niihara, except on tracks 3, 4, 7, 11 by Takasaki

1. "The Winds of Victory" - 4:41
2. "The Hate That Fills My Lonely Cells" - 6:00
3. "The End of Earth" - 4:29
4. "Stay Wild" - 5:48
5. "The Seven Deadly Sins" - 5:31
6. "Picture Your Life" - 3:20
7. "How Many More Times" - 5:40
8. "Touch My Heart" - 5:10
9. "Climaxxx" - 4:05
10. "A Stroke of Lightning" - 5:13
11. "Never Forget You" - 5:00
12. "Spiritual Canoe" (instrumental) - 1:32
13. "The Power of Love" - 7:06

== Personnel ==
Loudness

- Minoru Niihara - vocals
- Akira Takasaki - guitars
- Masayoshi Yamashita - bass
- Munetaka Higuchi - drums

Production

- Masatoshi Sakimoto - engineer, mixing
- Tatsuhiko Kaneko - assistant engineer
- Hiroyuki Hosaka - mastering
- Toshi Nakashita, Eiichi Yamakawa - executive producers
