= Engine (Loudness album) =

Studio album by Loudness
- Released: July 7, 1999
- Studio: TML Studios, Hayward, California, USA, Mod Studio Being, Tokyo, Japan
- Genre: Heavy metal, speed metal, hard rock, groove metal
- Length: 57:27
- Label: Rooms
- Producer: Akira Takasaki, Masao Nakajima

Loudness chronology
Dragon (1998)	Engine (1999)	Spiritual Canoe (2001)

Professional ratings
Review scores
Source	Rating
AllMusic	3/5 stars

Engine is the fourteenth studio album by Japanese heavy metal band Loudness. Released in 1999, it was the third and final album to feature the lineup of guitarist Akira Takasaki, lead vocalist Masaki Yamada, bassist Naoto Shibata, and drummer Hirotsugu Homma before Takasaki reunited the original lineup in 2001.

== Track listing ==
All music by Akira Takasaki and all lyrics by Masaki Yamada, except "Ace in the Hole" with music by Hirotsugu Homma and lyrics by Kayla Ritt.

1. "Soul Tone" (instrumental) - 2:43
2. "Bug Killer" - 5:04
3. "Black Biohazard" - 3:55
4. "Twist of Chain" - 3:40
5. "Bad Date (Nothing I Can Do)" - 2:58
6. "Apocalypse" - 4:11
7. "Ace in the Hole" - 4:09
8. "Sweet Dreams" - 4:37
9. "Asylum" - 6:27
10. "Burning Eye Balls" - 4:58
11. "Junk His Head" - 5:51
12. "2008 (Candra 月天)" (instrumental) - 2:47
13. "Coming Home" - 6:07

== Personnel ==
Loudness

- Masaki Yamada - vocals
- Akira Takasaki - guitars, producer
- Naoto Shibata - bass
- Hirotsugu Homma - drums

Production

- Daniel McClendon - engineer, mixing
- Masayuki Aihara - engineer on track 1, mixing on tracks 1, 10, 12
- Fumiko Kunou - mastering
- George Azuma - supervisor
- Masao Nakajima - executive producer
