= Devil Soldier =

Studio album by Loudness
- Released: July 21, 1982
- Studio: Studio Birdman, Nippon Columbia Studio, Tokyo, Japan
- Genre: Heavy metal
- Length: 37:06
- Language: Japanese
- Label: Nippon Columbia
- Producer: Loudness, Daiko Nagato

Loudness chronology
The Birthday Eve (1981)	Devil Soldier (1982)	The Law of Devil's Land (1983)

Professional ratings
Review scores
Source	Rating
AllMusic	2.5/5 stars
Collector's Guide to Heavy Metal	7/10

Devil Soldier (戦慄の奇蹟, Senritsu no kiseki) is the second studio album by Japanese heavy metal band Loudness. It was released in 1982. The American Daniel McClendon (brother of Tommy McClendon) was called to engineer the sound of this album, because there was no Japanese technician experienced enough in heavy metal records at the time. The album won the award for Best Heavy Metal record of the year in Japan. The reissue in CD of 2005 contains two bonus tracks, coming from the second single of the band.

== Track listing ==
All lyrics are written by Minoru Niihara; all music is composed by Akira Takasaki.

Side one
No.	Title	Length
1.	"Lonely Player"	4:51
2.	"Angel Dust"	4:47
3.	"After Illusion"	5:59
4.	"Girl"	2:34

Side two
No.	Title	Length
1.	"Hard Workin'"	3:30
2.	"Loving Maid"	4:55
3.	"Rock the Nation"	3:23
4.	"Devil Soldier"	7:08

2005 CD bonus tracks
No.	Title	Length
9.	"Geraldine"	4:00
10.	"Lonely Player" (Live)	5:02

== Personnel ==
Loudness

- Minoru Niihara - vocals
- Akira Takasaki - guitars
- Masayoshi Yamashita - bass
- Munetaka Higuchi - drums

Production

- Daiko Nagato - producer
- Daniel McClendon - engineer, mixing
- Kenichi Kishi, Masao Nakajima - label executives
- Keisuke Tsukimitsu - art direction

== See also ==
- 1982 in Japanese music
