= 2012 (Loudness album) =

2･0･1･2

Studio album by Loudness
- Released: August 22, 2012
- Recorded: March 2012
- Studios: Osaka School of Music, Freedom Studio, Tokyo, Japan
- Genre: Heavy metal
- Length: 47:35 (Standard edition); 53:34 (Special edition)
- Label: Tokuma Japan
- Producers: Loudness, Masahiro Shinoki, Keiichi Horiuchi

Loudness chronology
Eve to Dawn (2011)	2･0･1･2 (2012)	The Sun Will Rise Again (2014)

2012 (stylized 2･0･1･2) is the 25th studio album by the Japanese heavy metal band Loudness, released on August 22, 2012. "The Voice of Metal" is about and dedicated to the late Ronnie James Dio.

== Track listing ==
All lyrics are written by Minoru Niihara, English lyrics co-written by Takashi Kanazawa; all music is composed by Akira Takasaki, except where noted.

No.	Title	Length
1.	"The Stronger"	4:20
2.	"2012~End of the Age"	5:00
3.	"Break New Ground"	5:07
4.	"Driving Force"	4:55
5.	"Behind the Scene"	5:31
6.	"Bang'em Dead"	4:07
7.	"The Voice of Metal (Song for RJD)"	4:12
8.	"Who the Hell Cares"	5:40
9.	"Spirit from the East" (instrumental)	2:18
10.	"Memento Mori" (Masayoshi Yamashita)	4:38
11.	"Out of the Space" (Takasaki and Masatoshi Sakimoto, instrumental)	1:51

Special edition bonus CD
No.	Title	Length
1.	"Deep-Six the Law"	5:59

== Personnel ==
Loudness

- Minoru Niihara – vocals
- Akira Takasaki – guitars, keyboards
- Masayoshi Yamashita – bass
- Masayuki Suzuki – drums

Production

- Masatoshi Sakimoto – engineer, mixing
- Haruka Shinohara, Yuko Tanabe – assistant engineers
- Manfred Melchior – mastering at MM Sound, Steinhagen, Germany
- Hirose Shiraishi – supervisor
- Masahiro Shinoki, Keiichi Horiuchi – executive producers
