= Disillusion (album) =

Studio album by Loudness
- Released: January 21, 1984
- Recorded: September 1983
- Studio: SARM Studio, London
- Genre: Heavy metal
- Length: 38:06; 40:18 (English version)
- Language: Japanese
- Label: Nippon Columbia (Japan); Music for Nations (UK); Roadrunner (Europe)
- Producer: Loudness, Mikio Shimizu, Toshi Nakashita

Loudness chronology
Live-Loud-Alive: Loudness in Tokyo (1983)	Disillusion (1984)	Odin EP (1985)

English version cover

Disillusion (Japanese: 撃剣霊化, Hepburn: Gekken Reika) is the fourth studio album by Japanese heavy metal band Loudness. It was recorded, mixed and mastered in London, England, in 1983 and released at the beginning of 1984. The sound engineer chosen for the recording sessions was the expert Julian Mendelsohn, who had previously worked with acts like Yes, Elton John, Jimmy Page and Bob Marley. The original Japanese version was licensed and released by Music for Nations in the UK and Roadrunner Records in Europe. Attention by major US labels for the band and the need to make their work accessible to Western audiences, prompted a new release of the album with vocal tracks sung in English on July 1, 1984. The English version opened the album with the instrumental "Anthem (Loudness Overture)" by Akira Takasaki, which was missing in the original Japanese release.

== Critical reception ==
Professional ratings
Review scores
Source	Rating
AllMusic	2/5 stars
Collector's Guide to Heavy Metal	6/10
Rock Hard	9.5/10

In 2005, Disillusion was ranked number 290 in Rock Hard magazine's book of The 500 Greatest Rock & Metal Albums of All Time. In September 2007, Rolling Stone Japan rated Disillusion No. 40 on its list of the "100 Greatest Japanese Rock Albums of All Time". In 2018, readers and professional musicians voted Disillusion the second best album in the history of hard rock and heavy metal in We Rock magazine's "Metal General Election". In 2019, "Exploder" was named the 21st best guitar instrumental by Young Guitar Magazine.

== Track listing ==
=== Japanese version ===
All lyrics are written by Minoru Niihara. English lyrics by Tommy McClendon; all music is composed by Akira Takasaki.

Side one
No.	Title	Length
1.	"Crazy Doctor"	4:13
2.	"Esper"	3:45
3.	"Butterfly" (Mashō no Onna (魔性の女; "The Enchantress"))	5:12
4.	"Revelation" (Keiji (啓示))	4:19

Side two
No.	Title	Length
1.	"Exploder" (Instrumental)	2:29
2.	"Dream Fantasy" (Yume Fantasy (夢・Fantasy))	4:34
3.	"Milky Way"	4:17
4.	"Satisfaction Guaranteed"	3:39
5.	"Ares' Lament" (Aresu no Nageki (アレスの嘆き))	5:30

2004 CD bonus tracks
No.	Title	Length
10.	"Crazy Doctor" (Live English Version)	4:10
11.	"Dream Fantasy" (Live English Version)	4:37

=== English version ===
Side one
No.	Title	Length
1.	"Anthem (Loudness Overture)"	2:18
2.	"Crazy Doctor"	4:13
3.	"Esper"	3:45
4.	"Butterfly"	5:12
5.	"Revelation"	4:20

Side two
No.	Title	Length
1.	"Exploder" (Instrumental)	2:31
2.	"Dream Fantasy"	4:35
3.	"Milky Way"	4:18
4.	"Satisfaction Guaranteed"	3:37
5.	"Ares' Lament"	5:29

2005 Japanese CD release bonus tracks
No.	Title	Length
11.	"Eruption"	3:14
12.	"Flash Out"	4:07

== Personnel ==
Loudness

- Minoru Niihara – vocals
- Akira Takasaki – guitars
- Masayoshi Yamashita – bass, Taurus pedals
- Munetaka Higuchi – drums

Production

- Julian Mendelsohn – engineer
- Stuart Bruce – assistant engineer
- Geoff Pesche – mastering at Tape One Studios, London
- Mikio Shimizu, Toshi Nakashita – executive producers

== See also ==
- 1984 in Japanese music
