= The Sun Will Rise Again =

Studio album by Loudness
- Released: June 3, 2014
- Studio: Osaka School of Music, Solid Vox Studio, Sound Arts Studios, Tokyo, Japan
- Genre: Heavy metal
- Length: 59:08 (58:53 on U.S. Mix version)
- Label: Thunderball 667, Universal Music Group
- Producer: Loudness

Loudness chronology
2･0･1･2 (2012)	The Sun Will Rise Again (2014)	Rise to Glory (2018)

The Sun Will Rise Again (撃魂霊刀, Gekken Reitou) is the twenty-sixth studio album by Japanese heavy metal band Loudness, released on June 3, 2014. A US mix of the album was released on October 7, 2015, in which the songs were remixed, and the album cover shows a blue-and-white rising sun design, instead of the traditional red-and-white. The tracks "Nourishment of the Wind" and "Got to Be Strong" are only released on the Japanese edition of the album, while "Rock Will Never Die" is only released on the US edition.

== Track listing ==
All lyrics are written by Minoru Niihara, English lyrics co-written by Takashi Kanazawa; all music is composed by Akira Takasaki

No.	Title	Length
1.	"Nourishment of the Mind" (instrumental)	2:08
2.	"Got to Be Strong"	6:05
3.	"Never Ending Fire"	5:10
4.	"The Metal Man"	2:45
5.	"Mortality"	4:48
6.	"The Best"	8:20
7.	"The Sun Will Rise Again"	5:48
8.	"Rock You Wild"	4:30
9.	"Greatest Ever Heavy Metal"	8:13
10.	"Shout"	5:20
11.	"Not Alone"	6:08

=== 2015 U.S. Mix release ===
No.	Title	Length
1.	"The Sun Will Rise Again"	5:48
2.	"The Metal Man"	2:45
3.	"Mortality"	4:48
4.	"Shout"	5:20
5.	"Not Alone"	6:08
6.	"Rock Will Never Die"	4:42
7.	"Rock You Wild"	4:30
8.	"The Best"	8:20
9.	"Never Ending Fire"	5:10
10.	"Greatest Ever Heavy Metal"	8:13

== Personnel ==
Loudness

- Minoru Niihara – vocals
- Akira Takasaki – guitars
- Masayoshi Yamashita – bass
- Masayuki Suzuki – drums

Production

- Masatoshi Sakimoto – engineer, mixing
- Kohki Meno – engineer
- Hiorshi Ishida, Kento Imagawa, Nobuhiro Kawashima, Takanari Shibuchi – assistant engineers
- Brian "Big Bass" Gardner – mastering at Bernie Grundman Mastering, Los Angeles
- Yoshichika Kuriyama – additional programming, sound effects
- Kimitaka Kato, Shunji Inoue – supervisors
