= Loudness (band) =

Japanese heavy metal band

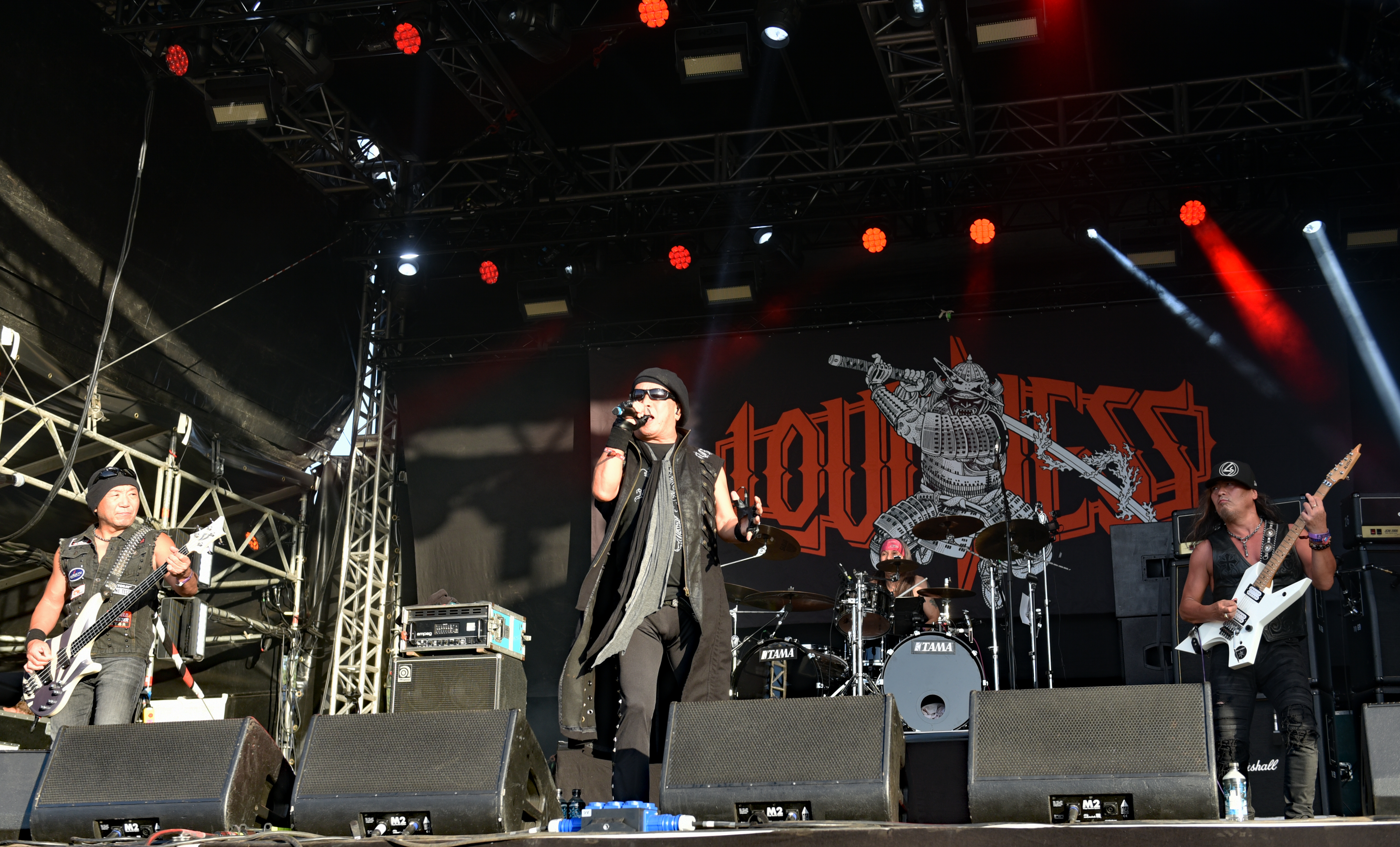
- Loudness at Wacken Open Air in 2022

Background information
- Origin: Osaka, Japan
- Genres: Heavy metal; glam metal; speed metal; progressive metal; groove metal (1990s-2000s)
- Works: Discography
- Years active: 1981–present
- Labels: Nippon Columbia; Atco; Atlantic; Warner Music Group; Rooms; Tokuma Japan
- Spinoff of: Lazy
- Members: Akira Takasaki; Masayoshi Yamashita; Minoru Niihara; Masayuki Suzuki
- Past members: Munetaka Higuchi; Mike Vescera; Masaki Yamada; Taiji Sawada; Hirotsugu Homma; Naoto Shibata
- Website: loudnessjp.com

Loudness (Japanese: ラウドネス, Hepburn: Raudonesu) is a Japanese heavy metal band formed in 1981 by guitarist Akira Takasaki and drummer Munetaka Higuchi. They were the first Japanese metal band signed to a major label in the United States. Loudness has released twenty-eight studio albums (five licensed in America) and eleven live albums as of 2026, and had reached the Billboard 200 during their heyday as well as charting on Oricon dozens of times. Despite numerous line-up changes in the band's history, leaving Takasaki as the sole constant member, the band continued their activities throughout the 1990s, finally reuniting the original line-up in 2000. This incarnation released a further seven albums until November 30, 2008, when original drummer Munetaka Higuchi died from liver cancer at a hospital in Osaka at age 49. He was replaced by Masayuki Suzuki.

== Biography ==
=== 1980–1984: From Lazy to Loudness ===
The band was formed by guitarist Akira Takasaki, bassist Hiroyuki Tanaka and drummer Munetaka Higuchi, coming off the breakup of the rock band Lazy in Tokyo in February 1980. The three musicians, Takasaki in particular, were dissatisfied with the musical direction of their previous band and wanted to test their abilities in new areas. The rising movement of new Japanese heavy metal acts (Bow Wow, Anthem, etc.) fit the aspirations and musical tendencies of the young musicians. Nevertheless, bassist Tanaka soon renounced to be part of the new metal group, searching success in the anime soundtrack business with the band Neverland. Takasaki recruited his childhood friend Masayoshi Yamashita as bass player and, after a few auditions, the band found a singer in former Earthshaker member Minoru Niihara. He was a university student at the time.

With this line-up, Loudness signed to the major record label Nippon Columbia and released their debut album, The Birthday Eve, in November 1981. Despite the reduced presence of the heavy metal genre in the Japanese media at the time and the lack of a single to launch the album, The Birthday Eve and the concerts to support it were quite successful. The flashy shred guitar work of Takasaki and the solid musicianship of the other band members soon became a trademark of their performances in the studio and on stage. The band, excited by the good sales response in Japan, produced four studio albums in rapid succession, while guitarist Takasaki found the time to start his solo career, releasing the album Tusk of Jaguar, which the other group members played in.

In 1983, after recording their third album The Law of Devil's Land, they embarked on their first United States tour, followed by a tour in Europe. They moved to Europe to record their fourth album Disillusion, performing several concerts there, as documented in their second video Eurobounds. As an attempt to break in the international scene, the band re-recorded the vocal tracks of the album Disillusion in English language, releasing their first album outside Japan in 1984.

=== 1985–1991: American years ===
Loudness in 1985. Original/classic 1980–1988, 2001–2008 line-up. (l-r) Yamashita, Niihara, Takasaki, Higuchi

Finally in 1985, through the management of Twisted Sister co-manager Joe Gerber, they signed an international record deal with Atco Records. Such an achievement was the first in Japanese music history for a heavy metal band. Their fifth album, the Max Norman-produced Thunder in the East, was recorded in the United States and was successful. It was their first American release and it peaked at No. 74 in the Billboard 200 chart, relying much on the strength of the single "Crazy Nights", whose video earned some rotation play on MTV.

Their sixth album, 1986's Lightning Strikes, was once again produced by Max Norman and charted at No. 64, receiving very good reviews and making Loudness a worldwide attraction. The album was released in Japan in a different version, under the name Shadows of War. Their success in the United States had pushed the group to write more commercial pop-metal tunes, like the single "Let It Go". Following this new and apparently chart-rewarding direction, the band lost some of their supportive Japanese fan base, which did not accept the homologation to the US glam metal sound.

Their seventh album Hurricane Eyes was released in 1987 worldwide with English lyrics. A Japanese version was subsequently released only in Japan later in the year with Niihara singing most of the lyrics in Japanese. The album was produced by the famous producer and sound engineer Eddie Kramer, who had worked with the likes of The Rolling Stones, Led Zeppelin, Jimi Hendrix and Kiss. The song "So Lonely", a reworked version of "Ares Lament" from the 1984 album Disillusion, was instead produced by Andy Johns, another world-famous producer. This was the last Loudness album to enter the US Billboard 200 chart, where it remained for four weeks, peaking at No. 190.

After the release of the EP Jealousy in 1988, singer Niihara was pushed out of the band, following producer Max Norman's suggestion that an English speaking vocalist could help the band breakthrough in the American market. The chosen American vocalist was former Obsession frontman Mike Vescera. Minoru Niihara continued his singing career in Japan as frontman of the metal bands Ded Chaplin, Sly and X.Y.Z.→A, besides releasing a solo album. The new Loudness line-up recorded two studio albums, Soldier of Fortune in 1989 and On the Prowl in 1991. The latter included only three new songs among remakes of older material translated and sung by Vescera. Despite extensive tours and strong support from their label, those albums did not improve the band's status in America and, on the contrary, further diminished the Japanese fanbase of Loudness. After the release of the single "Slap in the Face", Vescera left Loudness during their 1991 American tour, to join Yngwie Malmsteen's band. He was replaced by former EZO vocalist Masaki Yamada to finish the tour. The change of personnel did not influence the success of the band, because the sudden predilection of the American audience for the gritty and aggressive sound of grunge and alternative rock bands at the beginning of the 1990s, had already de facto put an end to the American adventure of Loudness, as well as to the careers of many other bands from the glam and heavy metal scenes.

=== 1992–1999: Back to the start ===
Soon after their return to Japan, Yamashita also left the band. He recommended former X bassist Taiji Sawada as his replacement. This line-up produced and released the self-titled album Loudness in June 1992, which charted at No. 2 in Japan, becoming their highest-charting album in their home country, and the live album Once and for All, which would be released in 1994. The sound and the music presented in these works is heavier and more aggressive than on the albums produced in America and marks the beginning of a new phase in the career of Akira Takasaki, main composer of the band. In 1993, the band was again on the verge of falling apart as their contract with their agency expired in May, making their future uncertain as it was difficult to conduct activities. As such, Taiji began forming his own band, and when he was contacted in November about continuing Loudness, he had to decline because he had already signed a contract for the new band. He went on to found D.T.R., while Higuchi also left and formed Sly with Niihara. Speaking of his time in Loudness, Taiji said it brought both joy and pressure, explaining that getting to be in his favorite band was a dream come true, but that constantly being compared to Yamashita was "hell".

Takasaki remained the only founding member, with a band to reinvent. In this period he traveled to India and converted to Buddhism, and found the right motivations to not disband Loudness. He convinced Yamada to stay on as singer and, with his help, recruited former Ezo drummer Hirotsugu Homma into the band. In 1994, the trio produced Heavy Metal Hippies, a transitional studio album, where Takasaki tried to mix the old Loudness sound with grunge and world music influences. To bring the band on tour, Takasaki completed the roster with Naoto Shibata, bassist and leader of the then disbanded Japanese heavy metal band Anthem. This new incarnation of Loudness released three further studio albums (Ghetto Machine, Dragon and Engine) and one live album (Loud 'n' Raw) between 1994 and 1999. The sound of these releases is quite different from the band's earlier works, with Takasaki's compositions veering strongly towards groove metal with heavy psychedelic and ethnic influences. Homma's double bass drum beat is another important difference from the earlier Loudness sound. The band toured regularly in Asia and went to Europe, where they participated in the 1999 edition of the Dynamo Open Air festival.

=== 2000–2008: Reunion and Higuchi's death ===
In 2000, Yamada expressed his wish to quit Loudness and suggested a reunion with the original line-up to celebrate the band's 20th Anniversary. Takasaki agreed with him and dismissed Homma and Shibata, asking at the same time Higuchi, Niihara and Yamashita to rejoin the band for the event. The original members of the band reunited in 2000, releasing the album Spiritual Canoe and conducting a reunion tour. Although intended to be a one-time event, the popularity of the band's reunion in their native Japan was overwhelming and the band decided to continue recording and live activities. At least one studio album and one DVD release have followed every year since the 2000 reunion, in addition to one-off recordings, like 2005's theme song for famed K-1 fighter Musashi ("The Battleship Musashi").

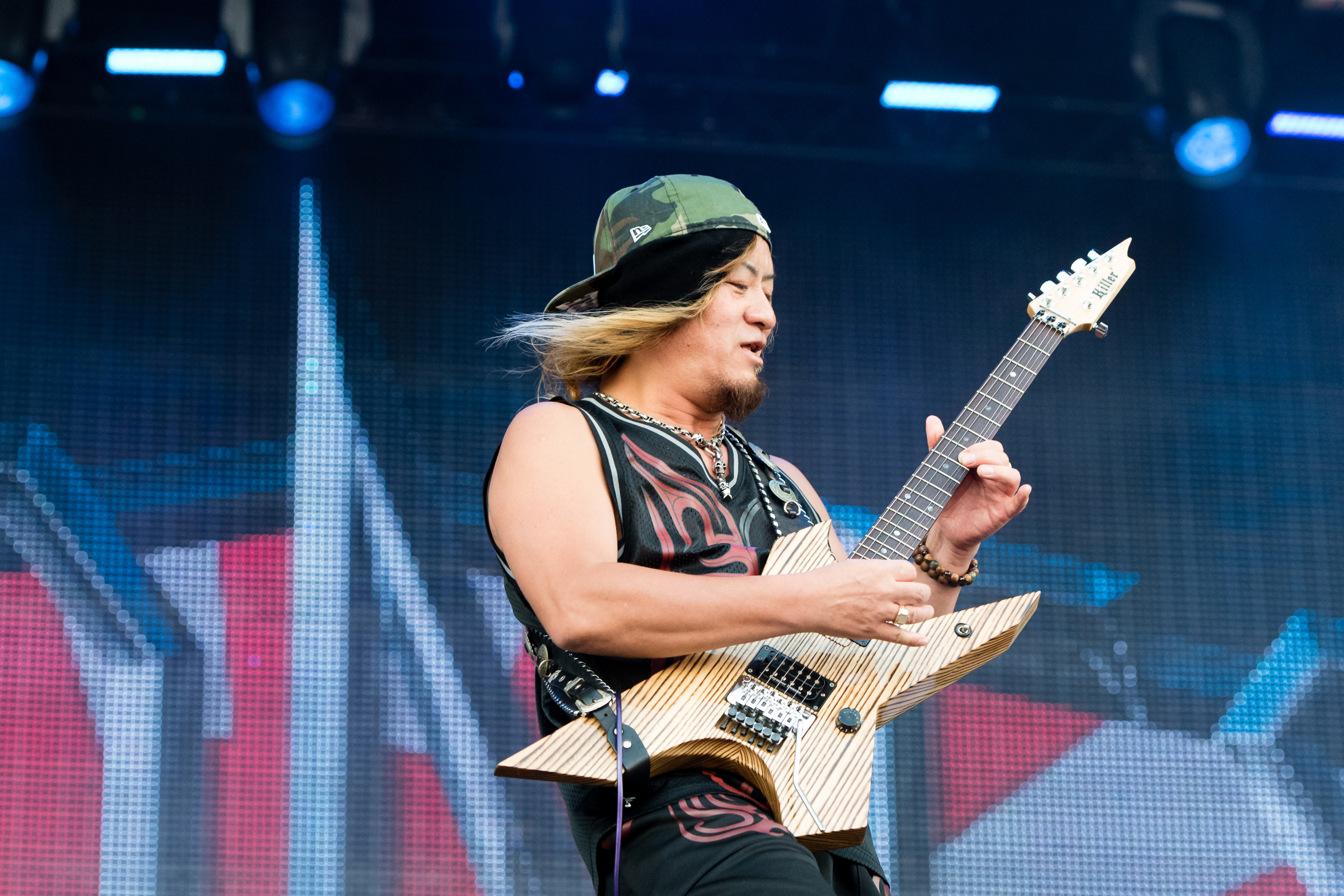
Sole constant member Takasaki reunited the original lineup of the band in 2001.

In the new Loudness studio albums, the band tries again the fusion of different musical influences with the melodic metal sound of the band from the 1980s, adopting very different styles of composition. The result is often a rather heterogeneous collection of songs, going from classic heavy metal sound to speed metal, thrash metal and grunge, with ethnic and even hip hop influences. The band's popularity remains very high in Japan, where they continued touring every year. Loudness even tried a new approach to the international market, with the reissue of the albums RockShocks and Racing in English language and an international tour that brought the band back to the US, as documented in the DVD Loudness in America '06.

Tragedy would strike in April 2008, just two months after releasing the album Metal Mad, Loudness went on hiatus when drummer Munetaka Higuchi was diagnosed with liver cancer. They played with Mötley Crüe in October 2008 at the Greater Tokyo Area's Saitama Super Arena, with session drummer Kozo Suganuma filling in for Higuchi. On November 30, 2008, Munetaka died from his illness at a hospital in Osaka at age 49.

=== 2009–present: New drummer ===
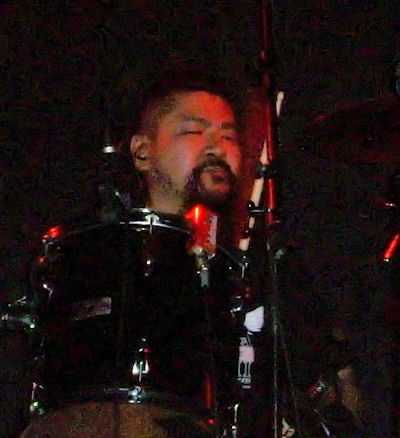
Drummer Masayuki Suzuki replaced Higuchi in 2009.

The band confirmed through Takasaki that, despite the recent loss of drummer Munetaka Higuchi, they would be recording a new studio album, The Everlasting, which was released in May 2009. The new material was based on drum tracks recorded by Higuchi before his death. Upon the album's release, they introduced their new drummer in Masayuki Suzuki. The band went on tour in 2009, presenting only material from their first four albums and announced their following album, King of Pain, which was released in May 2010. Also in 2010, Loudness was featured at the Bang Your Head!!! festival in Germany and did a brief European tour. Loudness returned to America for their 30th Anniversary tour in May and June 2011.

In 2010, they recorded "The Eternal Soldiers" to be the theme song for Mazinkaiser SKL, which was released as a single later that year.

In an interview with Guitar World and posted on YouTube on July 11, 2011, Akira Takasaki commented on King of Pain's lack of solos and speed. He said that the reason for this was the band's desire to introduce Masayuki Suzuki, their new drummer. Takasaki also stated that the next album's playing would be "much more speedy, much more aggressive" than King of Pain. Loudness released Eve to Dawn on September 14, 2011.

Another album, 2012, followed on August 22, 2012. Due to a scheduling conflict with Niihara's side project X.Y.Z.→A, Michael Vescera was scheduled to perform as guest vocalist on April 14, 2013, at the Live N' Louder Festival in São Paulo, Brazil, which would mark the first time he has sung with the band in over 20 years. However, Vescera was unable to attend the event, and Hibria vocalist Iuri Sanson ended up filling in the vocalist spot.

The band released their 26th studio album, The Sun Will Rise Again, on June 4, 2014.

The group teamed up with Outrage to hold the first Loud∞Out Fest on May 2, 2015. The second installment was held on May 1, 2016, and also included Anthem and Lost Society in addition to the two namesake acts. The 2017 edition of the fest was called a "tour" and saw two concerts on May 4 and 6 that included Galneryus.

In January 2018, the band released their 27th studio album, Rise to Glory. However, in February, Suzuki was hospitalized with a mild stroke. The band tapped Ra:IN drummer Ryuichi Nishida to fulfill its touring obligation until Suzuki's full recovery and return in September 2018. The end of 2021 saw the release of Loudness' 28th studio album, Sunburst. The band pulled out of an announced European tour in early 2023. The band and tour promoter offered different accounts of the reason for the cancellation.

The band announced a series of performances in the US, Europe and Japan throughout 2026 to celebrate its 45th anniversary. This included a scheduled performance at the Hell's Heroes music festival in Houston in March.

== Musical style ==
According to Alex Distefano of OC Weekly, the band fuses power metal with glam metal. He said the band plays "cheesy, yet powerfully loud songs with a good backdrop of heavy bass and hard drumming." He also said the band plays "virtuoso style" guitar solos. They also stated that Akira Takasaki "alternates in and out of high pitch screams and operatic singing with more than one vocalist, creating songs that are memorable and meant to be experienced live."

In 2004, Guitar World wrote that, "If you can't be Eddie Van Halen, then being Japan's Eddie Van Halen is the next best thing. Takasaki's blistering ax attack was already big stuff in his homeland by the time his group, Loudness, set their sights on America. Singer Minoru Niihara's poor English skills hampered 1985's Thunder in the East, but Takasaki tore through tracks such as 'Heavy Chains' and 'No Way Out' with fiery passion."

== Members ==
Current

- Akira Takasaki – guitars, backing vocals (1981–present)
- Masayoshi Yamashita – bass, backing vocals (1981–1991, 2000–present)
- Minoru Niihara – lead vocals (1981–1988, 2000–present)
- Masayuki Suzuki – drums (2009–present)

Former

- Munetaka Higuchi – drums (1981–1993, 2000–2008; his death)
- Mike Vescera – lead vocals (1988–1991)
- Masaki Yamada – lead vocals (1992–2000)
- Taiji Sawada – bass, backing vocals (1992–1993; died 2011)
- Naoto Shibata – bass, backing vocals (1994–2000)
- Hirotsugu Homma – drums (1994–2000)

Timeline

== Discography ==
=== Studio albums ===
- The Birthday Eve (1981)
- Devil Soldier (1982)
- The Law of Devil's Land (1983)
- Disillusion (1984)
- Thunder in the East (1985)
- Shadows of War (1986)
- Hurricane Eyes (1987)
- Soldier of Fortune (1989)
- On the Prowl (1991)
- Loudness (1992)
- Heavy Metal Hippies (1994)
- Ghetto Machine (1997)
- Dragon (1998)
- Engine (1999)
- Spiritual Canoe (2001)
- Pandemonium (2001)
- Biosphere (2002)
- Terror (2004)
- Racing (2004)
- Breaking the Taboo (2006)
- Metal Mad (2008)
- The Everlasting (2009)
- King of Pain (2010)
- Eve to Dawn (2011)
- 2012 (2012)
- The Sun Will Rise Again (2014)
- Rise to Glory (2018)
- Sunburst (2021)
