= The Birthday Eve =

1981 studio album by Loudness

Studio album by Loudness
- Released: November 21, 1981
- Recorded: August–October 1981
- Studio: Chestnut Studio, Studio Birdman, Tokyo, Japan
- Genre: Heavy metal
- Length: 40:04
- Language: Japanese
- Label: Nippon Columbia
- Producer: Loudness, Daiko Nagato

Loudness chronology
The Birthday Eve (1981)	Devil Soldier (1982)

Professional ratings
Review scores
Source	Rating
AllMusic	2/5 stars
Collector's Guide to Heavy Metal	6/10

"Burning Love"

Single by Loudness
- A-side: "Burning Love"
- B-side: "Bad News"
- Released: May 01, 1982
- Genre: Heavy metal
- Length: 8:24
- Label: B&M
- Songwriter(s): Akira Takasaki, Minoru Niihara

Loudness singles chronology
"Burning Love" (1982)	"Geraldine" (1983)

The Birthday Eve is the first studio album by Japanese heavy metal band Loudness. It was released in 1981 only in Japan. The 24bit digitally remastered Japanese limited edition CD includes two additional tracks not on the original release, coming from the first single of the band. The success of the album was measured by Loudness' sold out debut concert at Asakusa International Theater, in front of an audience of 2.700.

== Track listing ==
All lyrics are written by Minoru Niihara; all music is composed by Akira Takasaki.

Side one
No.	Title	Length
1.	"Loudness"	5:10
2.	"Sexy Woman"	5:40
3.	"Open Your Eyes"	4:32
4.	"Street Woman"	5:17

Side two
No.	Title	Length
1.	"To Be Demon"	6:07
2.	"I'm on Fire"	3:41
3.	"High Try"	5:07
4.	"Rock Shock (More and More)"	4:56

2005 CD bonus tracks
No.	Title	Length
9.	"Burning Love"	3:57
10.	"Bad News"	4:27

== Personnel ==
Loudness

- Minoru Niihara - vocals
- Akira Takasaki - guitars
- Masayoshi Yamashita - bass
- Munetaka Higuchi - drums

Production

- Daiko Nagato - producer
- Seigen Ono - engineer, mixing
- Kenichi Kishi, Masao Nakajima - label executives
- Keisuke Tsukimitsu - art direction

== See also ==
- 1981 in Japanese music
