= Phantom Excaliver =

Japanese metal band

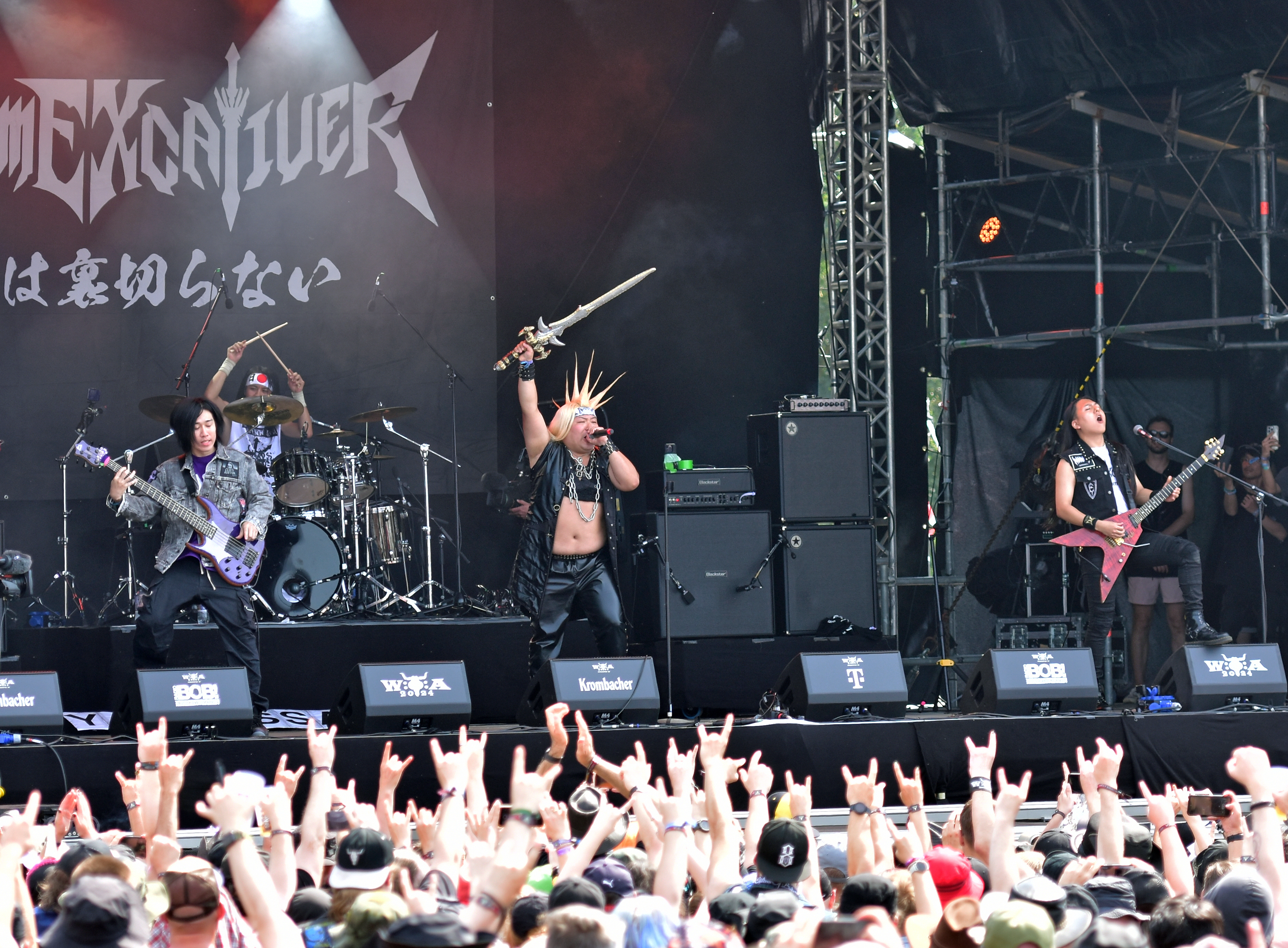
- Phantom Excaliver at 2024 Wacken Open Air

Background information
- Origin: Tokyo, Japan
- Genres: Melodic death metal, power metal, metalcore
- Years active: 2011–2013 (as Phantom X); 2013–2026 (as Phantom Excaliver)
- Labels: Howling Bull, Ritual, Insulin
- Members: Kacchang; Matsu; Yusaku; Tomo-P
- Past members: Hiroki; Ishikawa; Die-goro; Punch-Maru; Thomas
- Website: https://phantom-ex.com/

Phantom Excaliver is a Japanese melodic death metal/power metal/metalcore band from Tokyo. The band won the 1st place in the 2023 Wacken Open Air metal battle competition. In September 2026, the band announced that they would disband on November 1, 2026.

== History ==
The band was formed in 2011 as Phantom X and in 2013 the name was changed to the current one.

The band has been through 4 lineup changes. In 2012, bassist Ishikawa left the band. He was replaced by Die-goro, already in the same year. Die-goro was the band's bassist until 2019, and was replaced by Tomo-P, who is their current bassist. In 2014, drummer Hiroki left the band. He was replaced by Thomas in the same year, who was later replaced by Yusaku, the current drummer.

On 29 July 2023, the band performed in the Big Ass Metal Fest in the city Utrecht in the Netherlands.

On 3 August 2023, the band performed at Wacken Open Air. At that festival, the band also won the 1st place in the metal battle.

=== Disbandment ===
In September 2026, Phantom Excaliver announced that the band would officially disband on November 1, 2026.

== Members ==
=== Current members ===
- Kacchang – lead vocals
- Matsu – guitars
- Yusaku – drums
- Tomotaka/Tomo-P – bass

=== Past members ===
- Hiroki (drums 2011–2014)
- Ishikawa (bass 2011–2012)
- Die-goro (bass 2012–2018)
- Punch-Maru(bass 2018-2022)
- Thomas (drums 2014–2022)

== Discography ==
- 鋼鉄の誓い (Ritual Records, 2015)
- 幻の聖剣 (Insulin Records, 2017)
- THE RISING KINGDOM (Marquee / Avalon, 2024)
