= Lightning Strikes (Loudness album) =

Lightning Strikes / Shadows of War

Studio album by Loudness
- Released: March 24, 1986 (Japan); July 25, 1986 (US)
- Recorded: December 1985–February 1986
- Studio: Sedic Studio and Take One Studios, Tokyo, Japan
- Genre: Heavy metal, glam metal
- Length: 39:23
- Label: WEA Japan (Shadows of War); ATCO (Lightning Strikes)
- Producer: Max Norman, Paul Cooper

Loudness chronology
Thunder in the East (1985)	Lightning Strikes / Shadows of War (1986)	8186 Live (1987)

Singles from Lightning Strikes / Shadows of War
- 1. "Let It Go" Released: March 10, 1986

Shadows of War cover

Professional ratings
Review scores
Source	Rating
AllMusic	3/5 stars
Collector's Guide to Heavy Metal	6/10
Kerrang!	4/5 stars

Lightning Strikes is the sixth studio album by the Japanese heavy metal band Loudness. The album, which was released on July 25, 1986, remained 15 weeks in the U.S. charts, peaking at #64 (Billboard 200). The album was produced by Max Norman. Lyrics for the album are credited to Loudness, even though producer Max Norman did a lot of uncredited work on them.

The album is known as Shadows of War in Japan, where it was released on March 24, 1986. The tracks are in a different order, and the song "Ashes in the Sky" is known as "Shadows of War." There is also a slight difference in some vocal melodies and arrangements, most notably an extended musical outro to "One Thousand Eyes".

== Track listings ==
=== Shadows of War (Japanese release) ===
All lyrics are written by Minoru Niihara; all music is composed by Akira Takasaki, except where noted.

Side one
No.	Title	Length
1.	"Shadows of War"	6:02
2.	"Let It Go"	4:13
3.	"Streetlife Dreams"	4:28
4.	"Black Star Oblivion"	3:55

Side two
No.	Title	Music	Length
1.	"One Thousand Eyes"		5:02
2.	"Complication"		4:00
3.	"Dark Desire"		4:19
4.	"Face to Face"	Masayoshi Yamashita	3:49
5.	"Who Knows (Time to Take a Stand)"		4:02

=== Lightning Strikes (U.S. release) ===
Side one
No.	Title	Music	Length
1.	"Let It Go"		4:13
2.	"Dark Desire"		4:19
3.	"1000 Eyes"		5:02
4.	"Face to Face"	Yamashita	3:49
5.	"Who Knows"		4:02

Side two
No.	Title	Length
1.	"Ashes in the Sky"	6:02
2.	"Black Star Oblivion"	3:55
3.	"Street Life Dream"	4:28
4.	"Complication"	4:00

== Personnel ==
Loudness

- Minoru Niihara - vocals
- Akira Takasaki - guitars
- Masayoshi Yamashita - bass
- Munetaka Higuchi - drums

Additional musicians

- Masanori Sasaji - keyboards

Production

- Max Norman - producer, mixing at Bearsville Studios, Bearsville, NY, USA
- Bill Freesh - engineer
- Masachi Goto - assistant engineer
- Bob Ludwig - mastering at Masterdisk, New York
- Paul Cooper - executive producer
- George Azuma - supervisor
- Mikio Shimizu, Sam Nagashima - coordinators

== See also ==
- 1986 in Japanese music
