= Masaki Yamada (musician) =

Japanese musician

- Also known as: MASAKI
- Born: February 17, 1964 (age 61); Hokkaido, Japan
- Genres: Heavy metal, glam metal, thrash metal,
- Occupation: Musician
- Instruments: Vocals, bass, guitar
- Years active: 1982-present
- Member of: Firesign
- Formerly of: EZO, Loudness, Flatbacker
- Website: firesignmusic.com

Masaki Yamada (山田 雅樹, Yamada Masaki; born 1964) is a Japanese singer, guitarist and bassist known for being the frontman of EZO from 1986 to 1991 and Loudness from 1992 to 2000. He currently plays bass and sings duet and backing vocals, with occasional guitar in the New York City-based band FiRESiGN. He was vocally trained by Donald Lawrence, and moved to New York City in 1986. He has a daughter, born in 1992.

== Discography ==
=== Albums ===
Year	Title	JP	US
1984	Minagoroshi(皆殺し) (Demo, with Fratvacker)		
1985	Accident(戦争) (with Flatbacker)		
1986	Esa(餌) (with Flatbacker)		
1987	EZO (with EZO)	6	150
1989	Fire Fire (with EZO)	19	
1992	Loudness (with Loudness)	2	
1994	Heavy Metal Hippies (with Loudness)	29	
1995	Loud 'n' Raw (Live) (with Loudness)		
1997	Ghetto Machine (with Loudness)	65	
1998	Dragon (with Loudness)	49	
1999	Engine (with Loudness)	48	

=== Videos ===
Year	Title
1985	War is Over (with Flatbacker)
1988	E・Z・O (with EZO)
2004	Returns (with EZO)
