= Minoru Niihara =

Japanese singer

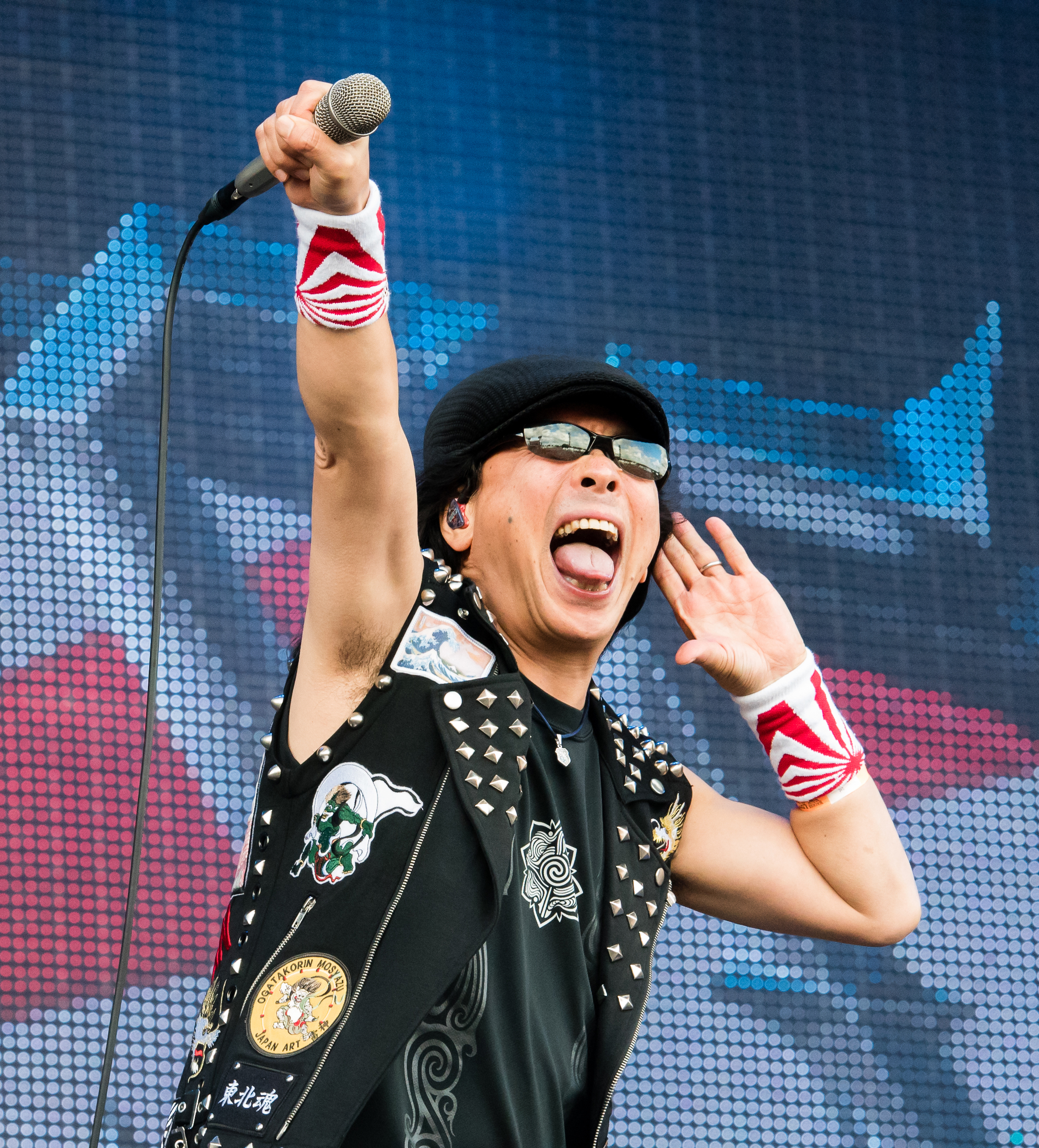
- Niihara performing with Loudness at Wacken Open Air 2016

Background information
- Born: March 12, 1960 (age 65)
- Origin: Osaka, Japan
- Genres: Rock, heavy metal
- Occupation: Singer
- Years active: 1980–present
- Member of: Loudness; X.Y.Z.→A
- Formerly of: Earthshaker; Ded Chaplin; Sly
- Website: http://www.blasty.jp/niihara/

Minoru Niihara (二井原 実, Niihara Minoru; born March 12, 1960) is a Japanese singer. He is the original and current lead vocalist of the heavy metal band Loudness.

His first band was Earthshaker, in which he played bass and sang. His vocal style was influenced by blues singers, but he adapted quickly his voice to the high pitch tones requested in a heavy metal act. He was selected after an audition to become the lead singer of Loudness in 1981 and his voice, together with the flashy guitar work of guitarist Akira Takasaki were recognized as a trademark of the band. Although the first three albums were sung using mostly Japanese lyrics, he started singing in English only on their 1984 album, Disillusion.

After Loudness released Jealousy, he left the band in 1988 and was replaced by the American singer Mike Vescera. After working with several bands (including Ded Chaplin, Sly and X.Y.Z.→A), as well as his solo career, he returned to Loudness in 2001. He released two solo albums: One in 1989 and Ashes To Glory in 2006, in addition to recording many albums with Sly and X.Y.Z.→A. In 2008 he formed a parallel band called Nishidera Minoru, with Show-Ya's singer Keiko Terada and Earthshaker's singer Masafumi "Marcy" Nishida. They released an album and produced and organized the Hard na Yaon 2009 festival. In 2018, readers and professional musicians voted Niihara the fifth best vocalist in the history of hard rock and heavy metal in We Rock magazine's "Metal General Election".

== Discography ==
=== Solo albums ===
- One (1989)
- Ashes to Glory (2006)
- R&R Gypsy Show (live 2008)
- Tower of Power Night Live (live 2011)

=== Albums with Loudness ===
- The Birthday Eve (1981)
- Devil Soldier (1982)
- The Law of Devil's Land (1983)
- Live-Loud-Alive: Loudness in Tokyo (live 1983)
- Disillusion (1984)
- Disillusion (1984) – English version
- Odin (EP 1985)
- Thunder in the East (1985)
- Shadows of War (1986)
- Lightning Strikes (1986) – U.S. remix of Shadows of War
- 8186 Live (live 1986)
- Hurricane Eyes (1987)
- Hurricane Eyes (1987) – Japanese Version
- Jealousy (EP 1988)
- Eurobounds (live 2000)
- Spiritual Canoe (2001)
- The Soldier's Just Came Back (live 2001)
- Pandemonium (2001)
- Biosphere (2002)
- Loudness Live 2002 (live 2003)
- Terror (2004)
- RockShocks (2004)
- Racing (2004)
- Breaking The Taboo (2006)
- Metal Mad (2008)
- The Everlasting (2009)
- King of Pain (2010)
- Eve to Dawn (2011)
- 2012 (2012)
- The Sun Will Rise Again (2014)

=== Albums with Ded Chaplin ===
- 1st (1990)
- Rock the Nation (1991)
- Final Revolution (1992)

=== Albums with Sly ===
- Sly (1994)
- Dreams of Dust (1995)
- Key (1996)
- Vulcan Wind (1998)

=== Albums with X.Y.Z.→A ===
- Asian Typhoon (1999)
- Asian Typhoon (2000) – English version
- Metalization (2000)
- Metalization (2001) – English version
- Life (2002)
- IV (2003)
- X.Y.Z.→ALIVE (live 2004)
- Wings (2006)
- Learn from Yesterday! Live for Today! Hope for Tomorrow! (2009)
- Seventh Heaven (2013)
- Wonderful Life (2019)

=== Albums with Nishidera Minoru ===
- Fuzoroi no Rock Tachi Sono 1 (2009)

=== Collaborations ===
- Akira Takasaki – Tusk of Jaguar (1982)
- M.T. Fuji – Human Transport (1983)
- Cozy Powell Forever ~ Tribute to Cozy Powell (1998)
