= Munetaka Higuchi =

Japanese drummer (1958–2008)

Background information
- Also known as: Davy
- Born: December 24, 1958; Nara, Japan
- Origin: Osaka, Japan
- Died: November 30, 2008 (aged 49) Osaka, Japan
- Genres: Heavy metal, rock
- Occupations: Drummer, record producer
- Years active: 1973–2008
- Formerly of: Lazy; Loudness; Sly

Munetaka Higuchi (樋口 宗孝, Higuchi Munetaka) (December 24, 1958 – November 30, 2008) was a Japanese musician and record producer. He is best known as the original drummer of the heavy metal band Loudness, but first rose to prominence as a member of Lazy in the 1970s. In 2018, readers and professional musicians voted Higuchi the second best drummer in the history of hard rock and heavy metal in We Rock magazine's "Metal General Election".

== Career ==
From a young age, he was considered a talented drummer. During his high school years, Higuchi played in seven bands. But he was not happy with this situation, wanting to focus his time on only one band. At this point, schoolmate and future bandmate Akira Takasaki came along and they formed Lazy. Lazy was formed by very young musicians and started playing easy-listening pop-rock, that slowly progressed to more complex music. Higuchi was identified in the band by the moniker "Davy".

When he and Takasaki shifted their musical interests to hard rock and heavy metal, they founded Loudness in 1981. During his time with Loudness, Higuchi released his first solo album, Destruction, in 1983. In the same year he produced and played drums on Mari Hamada's studio albums Lunatic Doll and Romantic Night. He left Loudness in 1992, and resumed his solo career in the late-1990s, working also on side projects, including Sly (with former Loudness' singer Minoru Niihara), Bloodcircus, Rose of Rose, and the Rock 'n' Roll Standard Club Band, besides collaborating with dozens of Japanese artists, both as producer and as drummer.

In 1997, as "Munetaka Higuchi & Dream Castle", he released the album Free World. The band featured many famous musicians from the jazz and rock/metal spheres, like Steve Vai, Stanley Clarke, Billy Sheehan, Ty Tabor, Terry Bozzio, T. M. Stevens, Ronnie James Dio, Richie Kotzen, Paulinho Da Costa and others. The album was released on February 21, 1997, in Japan. In 1998, he produced Cozy Powell Forever ~ Tribute to Cozy Powell, a tribute album to the recently deceased drummer Cozy Powell, very popular in Japan. For the album, Higuchi had the collaboration of the best Japanese heavy metal musicians and was able to reunite his former bandmates of Loudness. A tour in support of the album was made with musicians from Loudness and Sly.

He returned to Loudness in 2000, maintaining his high profile in the metal genre.

On April 14, 2008, just two months after Loudness released the album, Metal Mad, it was announced that he was diagnosed with hepatocellular carcinoma, a type of liver cancer. On November 30, 2008, Munetaka died at the age of 49 in a hospital in Osaka, Japan. His death had a vast echo in Japanese media and in the entertainment business.

== Equipment ==
Higuchi endorsed Pearl Drums, Sabian Cymbals, Remo drumheads and Vic Firth drumsticks.

== Discography ==
- Destruction ~破壊凱旋録~ (1983)
- Munetaka Higuchi with Dream Castle – Free World (1997)
- Cozy Powell Forever (1998)
- Super Rock Summit – Cozy Powell Forever Tour (1999)
- Super Rock Summit – Stairway to Heaven (1999)
- Super Rock Summit – Rainbow Eyes (1999)
- Munetaka Higuchi Drum Collection (2006)
- Higuchi Project Team - Free World II (2012)
