= Akira Takasaki =

Japanese guitarist (born 1961)

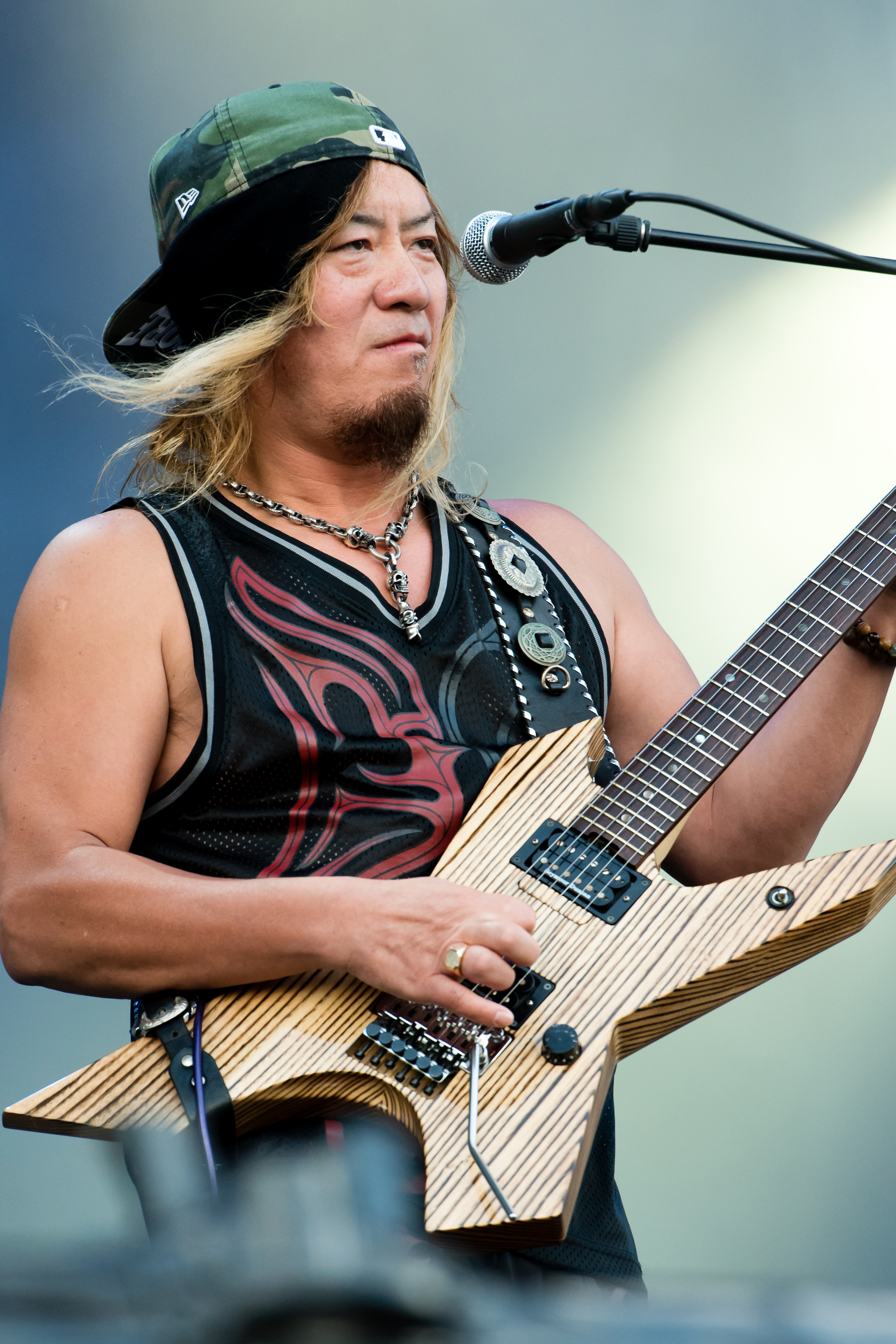
- Takasaki performing with Loudness at Wacken Open Air in 2016

Background information
- Also known as: Suzy
- Born: February 22, 1961 (age 65); Osaka, Japan
- Genres: Heavy metal, speed metal, hard rock, glam metal
- Occupation: Musician
- Instrument: Guitar
- Years active: 1973–present
- Member of: Lazy, Loudness

Akira Takasaki (高崎 晃, Takasaki Akira; born February 22, 1961) is a Japanese musician. He is best known as the lead guitarist and sole constant member of the heavy metal band Loudness. He is also the guitarist of the band Lazy, with which he first rose to prominence in the 1970s. In 2018, readers and professional musicians voted Takasaki the best guitarist in the history of hard rock and heavy metal in We Rock magazine's "Metal General Election".

== Career ==
He started his career as a guitarist, winning a TV contest for young music talents at the age of 14. He was rapidly put under contract to be part of the pop-rock band Lazy, of which drummer Munetaka Higuchi was also a member. Lazy produced five successful albums at the end of the 1970s, but Takasaki's musical style, oriented towards hard rock and heavy metal, did not gel with the band and in 1981 he decided to form his own band, Loudness, alongside bandmate Higuchi. The many heavy metal albums produced by Loudness brought him international fame and vast critical acclaim. He is the only member of Loudness that has been in the band since its inception, producing more than 20 studio albums in 25 years. Takasaki has also continued the production of solo works, starting with Tusk of Jaguar in 1982 and is now committed to a new side project called Ji-Zo. In 1998 and in 2002, he was also directly involved in the reunion of Lazy for the release of two new studio albums and for a tour. Takasaki found enough time to start Killer Guitars, a company co-founded and managed with fellow guitarist George Azuma. He is responsible for several of the guitar designs.

== Style ==
Takasaki's guitar playing style is characterized by complicated heavy metal riffs executed at great speed and with extreme precision, often using alternate picking technique and little vibrato. His compositions are usually filled with melodies and hooks, in order to make well-constructed songs, instead of long neo-classical themes like some of his peers do. His shred guitar work has attracted many fans over the world and his musicianship has often been compared to the ability of guitarists of his age like Paul Gilbert, Marty Friedman, Kirk Hammett, David T. Chastain and others. In 1986 Takasaki declared that the main influences for his compositions and guitar solos came from the work of Deep Purple's guitarist Ritchie Blackmore and from Japanese music for koto. He has also cited Hideki Ishima as an influence.

== Equipment ==
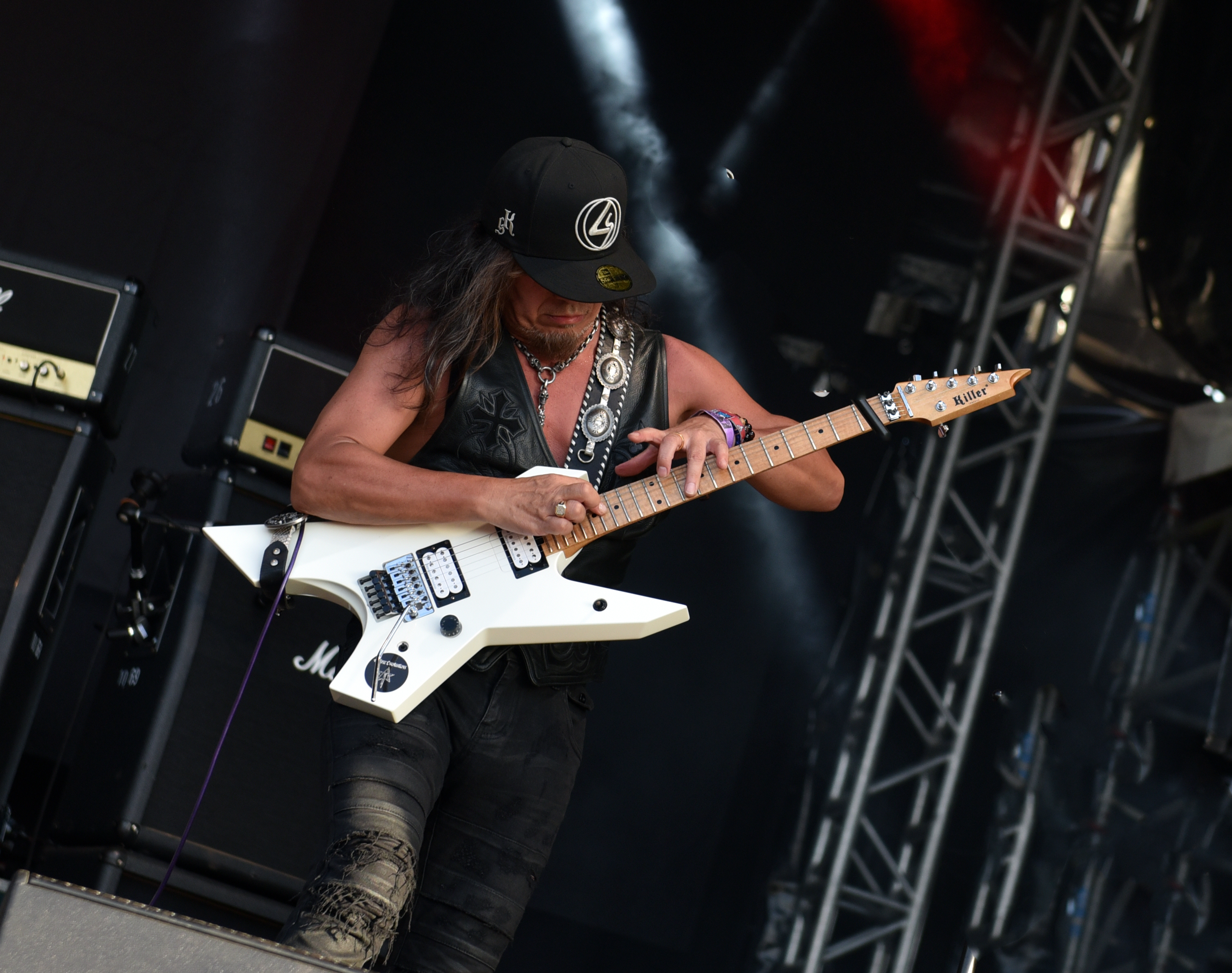
Takasaki playing a Killer guitar, 2022

Takasaki uses ESP Signature Random Star guitars and several Killer guitars, mostly the KG Prime model. He is co-owner of the Killer Guitars (キラーギターズ, Kirā Gitāzu) company, which are made and distributed by ESP. Its name was coined by rearranging the three hiragana characters that are found in both Takasaki's given name and the surname of his guitar technician Ichizo Araki into "kiraa" (きらあ), which sounds similar to the English word "killer".

Throughout Loudness' tenure, he has mostly used Marshall amps, ranging from Lee Jackson-modified Super Leads in the early-mid '80s, the JMP-1 preamp throughout the 1990s and 2000s, the JCM2000 DSL100, TSL100, and Modefour MF350 in the early-mid 2000s, and the JVM410H in the late 2000s, which is currently his main amp. Starting in the early 1990s, after the release of Loudness, Takasaki began using the Marshall JMP-1 preamp, which would be the center of his rig ever since, with other amps being along the side.

Alongside Marshall, Takasaki has used other amp brands. From 1986 to 1988, he used Mesa Boogie amps and cabinets, which were possibly used to record Hurricane Eyes. In 1988, Takasaki began using Lee Jackson Metaltronix amps, using the M-1000 amps on Soldier of Fortune, On the Prowl, and the following tours. Former Loudness manager, Kazuo Sumida said on an interview to Premier Guitar on February 11, 2010:

"On the On the Prowl album he had mainly used Lee Jackson's modded Marshall. I also think his Lee Jackson modified Marshalls were the main gear for the Soldier of Fortune album and tour, but I also remember Akira using the GP-1000 in his house, with a Macintosh Power Amp and JBL speakers. The sounds were really amazing… big sound. The GP-1000 was in the rack case surely, but I did not know when he used a particular preamp. At the Dec. 31, 1989 Tokyo Dome concert he might have used that GP-1000 with Ashley power amps, or it could have been the preamp section of his Lee Jackson-modified Marshall."

In 1992, Takasaki would begin using Peavey amps, making use of their solid state Supreme 160 heads, which could be heard on Loudness and the live release Once and for All. Peavey would be the last company he would endorse before switching back to Marshall in late 1992. Since 2016, he has been using and endorsing Friedman Amplifiers, and uses a BE100 model for live work.

He has also used Roland JC-120 combo amplifiers. His equipment in the 1980s was completed by Boss, Guyatone and Ibanez effects and Harmonizer, Roland delays, and Celestion speakers. He also currently has his own signature Shredneck.

== Solo albums ==
- Tusk of Jaguar (1982)
- Ki (1994)
- Wa (1996)
- Gene Shaft (2001)
- Made in Hawaii (2002)
- Splash Mountain (2004)
- Maca (2005)
- Osaka Works #128 (2006)
- Nenriki (2006)
- Black Brown (2007)
