= Andy Johns discography =

Discography by Andy Johns

This is a discography of records (primarily albums) produced, engineered, and/or mixed by Andy Johns for various acts. Johns, like his older brother Glyn Johns, was a British sound engineer and record producer. He worked on numerous well-known rock albums, including the Rolling Stones' Exile on Main St. (1972), Television's Marquee Moon (1977), and a series of albums by Led Zeppelin during the 1970s.

== Albums produced and/or engineered ==
The general reference used for this list is "Credits: Andy Johns" in AllMusic. (Note: Concerning Andy Johns' contributions as a producer, engineer, and mixer, usually references can be found in the various Wikipedia articles the albums listed below (click into blue links). However, in some cases sufficient references are not included in some of the Wikipedia articles, so to establish a minimum baseline of verification, the general reference used is "Credits: Andy Johns" in AllMusic. There may also be cases where certain albums are not mentioned in "Credits: Andy Johns" but are attested to in other reliable sources presented in the Wikipedia album articles. If that is so, then those albums are listed here along with their corresponding credits.) All albums mentioned in this list are either studio albums that were released containing all new material or otherwise live albums. Compilations of past material are not included in this list.

Artist	Year	Album	Producer	Engineer	Mixing
Gordon Beck Trio	1968	Gyroscope		check	
The Move	1968	Move		check	
The Bonzo Dog Band	1968	The Doughnut in Granny's Greenhouse		check	
The Small Faces	1968	There Are But Four Small Faces		check	
The Deviants	1968	Disposable		check	
Spooky Tooth	1969	Spooky Two		check	
Blodwyn Pig	1969	Ahead Rings Out	check		
Jethro Tull	1969	Stand Up		check	
Blind Faith	1969	Blind Faith		check	check
Humble Pie	1969	As Safe as Yesterday Is	check		
Jack Bruce	1969	Songs for a Tailor		check	
Led Zeppelin	1969	Led Zeppelin II		check	
Humble Pie	1969	Town and Country		check	
Renaissance	1969	Renaissance		check	
Clouds	1969	The Clouds Scrapbook		check	
Clouds	1969	Up Above our Heads		check	
Ten Years After	1969 (re-rel. 1997)	Ssssh -Ten Years After		check	
Eric Clapton	1970	Eric Clapton		check	
Free	1970	Highway	check	check	
Delaney & Bonnie and Friends	1970	On Tour with Eric Clapton		check	
Led Zeppelin	1970	Led Zeppelin III		check	check
Sky	1970	Don't Hold Back	check		
Free	1971	Free Live!	check		
The Rolling Stones	1971	Sticky Fingers		check	
Led Zeppelin	1971	Led Zeppelin IV		check	
Mott the Hoople	1971	Brain Capers		check	
Sky	1971	Sailor's Delight		check	
Bobby Whitlock	1972	Bobby Whitlock	check		
The Rolling Stones	1972	Exile on Main St.		check	
Jethro Tull	1972	Living in the Past		check	
West, Bruce and Laing	1972	Why Dontcha	check		
Free	1972	Heartbreaker	check		
Led Zeppelin	1973	Houses of the Holy		check	check
The Rolling Stones	1973	Goats Head Soup		check	check
The Rolling Stones	1974	It's Only Rock 'n' Roll		check	
Jack Bruce	1974	Out of the Storm	check	check	check
Led Zeppelin	1975	Physical Graffiti		check	
Larry Norman	1976	In Another Land	check	check	check
Randy Stonehill	1976	Welcome to Paradise		check	
Rod Stewart	1977	Foot Loose & Fancy Free		check	check
Eddie Money	1977	Eddie Money		check	check
Television	1977	Marquee Moon	check		
Rod Stewart	1978	Blondes Have More Fun		check	check
Axis	1978	It's a Circus World	check	check	
Les Dudek	1978	Ghost Town Parade (Note: This album was released in 2009 as part of a combined/merged album.)	check	check	check
Joni Mitchell	1980	Shadows and Light		check	
Rod Stewart	1980	Foolish Behaviour	check		
Ron Wood	1981	1234	check		
Hughes/Thrall	1982	Hughes/Thrall	check	check	check
Led Zeppelin	1982	Coda		check	
Cinderella	1986	Night Songs	check	check	check
McAuley Schenker Group	1987	Perfect Timing	check	check	check
Autograph	1987	Loud and Clear	check		
Show-Ya	1987	Immigration		check	
Eric Clapton	1988	Crossroads		check	
Show-Ya	1988	Glamour		check	
Cinderella’s	1988	Long Cold Winter		check	
House of Lords	1990	Sahara		check	
Killer Dwarfs	1990	Dirty Weapons		check	
The Broken Homes	1990	Wing and a Prayer	check	check	
Van Halen	1991	For Unlawful Carnal Knowledge	check	check	check
Killer Dwarfs	1992	Method to Madness	check	check	check
Wildside	1992	Under the Influence		check	
Joe Satriani	1992	The Extremist	check	check	check
Van Halen	1993	Live: Right Here, Right Now	check		check
Joe Satriani	1993	Time Machine	check		
Bon Jovi	1995	"Someday I'll Be Saturday Night"	check	check	
Doug Aldrich	1996	Highcentered	check	check	check
B'z	1996	"Real Thing Shakes"	check		check
L.A. Guns	2002	Waking the Dead	check		
pre)Thing	2004	22nd Century Lifestyle	check		
Godsmack	2004	Changes	check		check
Pepper's Ghost	2005	Shake the Hand That Shook the World	check	check	
Euphoraphonic	2005	Stone in the Sand	check	check	check
L.A. Guns	2005	Tales from the Strip	check		check
Godsmack	2006	IV	check	check	check
Ra	2006	Raw		check	check
Ill Niño	2006	The Undercover Sessions	check	check	check
The Dudek, Finnigan, & Krueger Band (DFK)	2006	The Dudek, Finnigan, & Krueger Band	check	check	check
Chickenfoot	2009	Chickenfoot	check	check	check
Steve Miller Band	2010	Bingo!	check		check
Eric Johnson	2010	Up Close			check
Switchblade Glory	2010	Switchblade Glory	check	check	check
Steve Miller Band	2011	Let Your Hair Down	check		check
L.A. Guns	2012	Hollywood Forever	check	check	
X-Drive	2014	Get Your Rock On	check		

== Film soundtracks engineered ==
- Good Guys Don't Always Wear White (1994) – Bon Jovi (soundtrack for The Cowboy Way) - produced
- Ladies and Gentleman The Rolling Stones Movie (2012) – The Rolling Stones - engineered
