= Genuine Diamond =

Studio album by Show-Ya
- Released: March 7, 2012
- Genre: Hard rock, heavy metal
- Length: 54:27
- Language: Japanese
- Label: Masterworks Productions (Japan)
- Producer: Masanori Sasaji

Show-Ya chronology
Show-Ya 20th Anniversary The Best (2005)	Genuine Diamond (2012)	Glamorous Show (2014)

Genuine Diamond is the tenth studio album by the Japanese hard rock band Show-Ya. It was released on March 7, 2012 and is the first studio album recorded with the original line-up since Hard Way of 1990, 22 years before.

The song "Fairy" from their album Ways of 1986 was re-recorded for this album.

== Track listing ==
1. "Bloody Rose – Bara no Monshō" (Bloody Rose ～薔薇の紋章～) (Keiko Terada, Yoshihiko Andō) – 3:27
2. "Outsider" (Terada & Miki Nakamura, Andō) – 4:56
3. "Ryūseishōjo - Shooting Star 196X" (流星少女～Shooting Star 196X～) (Satomi Senba & Miki Tsunoda, Andō) – 4:08
4. "Iki Ga Dekinai Hodo" (息ができないほど) (Terada, Yukinojō Mori) – 5:17
5. "Count8" (Senba & Tsunoda) – 3:11
6. "Get My Beat" (Terada, Andō) – 4:08
7. "Life with You" (Terada) – 6:12
8. "Sei – Saga" ( 性 ～Saga～) (Terada, Andō) – 4:53
9. "Survivor" (Terada, Andō) – 4:02
10. "Rolling Planet" (Miki Igarashi, Mori) – 4:36
11. "In My Arms" (Terada, Mori) – 4:36
12. "Fairy" (Igarashi, Terada) – 4:01

== Personnel ==
=== Band members ===
- Keiko Terada – vocals
- Miki Igarashi – guitars
- Miki Nakamura – keyboards
- Satomi Senba – bass
- Miki Tsunoda – drums
