= Cozy Powell Forever =

Compilation album by various artists
- Released: September 19, 1998
- Genre: Rock, hard rock, heavy metal
- Length: 61:31
- Label: Electric Angel Records (Japan)
- Producer: Munetaka Higuchi

Cozy Powell Forever is a tribute album dedicated to the British rock drummer Cozy Powell, who died a few months before the album release. The album was produced by Japanese drummer Munetaka Higuchi, with the contribution of many prominent Japanese rock and metal musicians and of the western musicians Carmine Appice and Tony Franklin. The songs covered in the album span from the early career of Powell in the Jeff Beck Group, to his membership in Rainbow, Whitesnake and Michael Schenker Group, to his solo production. Higuchi brought the songs of this album on tour in Japan and in 1999 released a live album with recordings of a show held in Tokyo.

== Track listing ==
1. "Overture 1812" (Pyotr Ilyich Tchaikovsky) – 3:48
2. "Stargazer" (Ritchie Blackmore, Ronnie James Dio) – 8:29
3. "Over the Top" (Don Airey, Cozy Powell) – 5:18
4. "Lost in Hollywood" (Blackmore, Roger Glover, Powell) – 4:50
5. "The Score" (Keith Emerson, Greg Lake) – 4:16
6. "Kill the King" (Blackmore, Dio, Powell) – 4:37
7. "Theme One" (George Martin) – 4:00
8. "Ice Cream Cakes" (Jeff Beck) – 5:43
9. "All Night Long" (Blackmore, Glover) – 3:54
10. "Since You Been Gone" (Russ Ballard) – 3:23
11. "Slide It In" (David Coverdale) – 3:26
12. "Armed and Ready" (Gary Barden, Michael Schenker) – 4:52
13. "The Loner – Dedicated to Jeff Beck" (Max Middleton) – 4:55

== Personnel ==
- Minoru Niihara (Loudness, Sly) - vocals on tracks 2, 5, 6, 8, 10
- Yuichi Ikusawa - vocals on tracks 4 and 9
- Keiko Terada (Show-Ya) - vocals on track 11
- Hironobu Kageyama (Lazy) - vocals on track 12
- Akira Takasaki (Lazy, Loudness) - guitar on tracks 2 and 8
- Hatake (Sharam Q) - guitar on tracks 4, 5 and 9
- Daita Ito (Siam Shade) - guitar on track 6
- Shinichiro 'Shara' Ishihara (Earthshaker, Sly) - guitar on tracks 6, 9–13
- Rei Atsumi (Vow Wow) - keyboards
- Koichi Terasawa (Sly) - bass on tracks 1–5, 10, 11, 13
- Taiji Sawada (X Japan, Loudness) - bass on track 6
- Tony Franklin - bass on tracks 7 and 12
- Hideki Samejima - bass on track 8
- Yoshitake Tanakamaru - bass on track 9
- Munetaka Higuchi (Lazy, Loudness, Sly) - drums on tracks 1–5, 8, 9, 13, producer
- Shinya Yamada (Luna Sea) - drums on track 6
- Carmine Appice - drums on tracks 7 and 12
- Kyoko Tomita (Princess Princess) - drums on tracks 9 and 10
- Kei Kashiyama - drums on track 11
