= Masquerade Show =

Studio album by Show-Ya
- Released: 6 September 1985
- Studio: Toshiba EMI Studios, Sound Inn Studio, Smoky Studio, Discomate Studio, Tokyo, Japan; Abbey Road Studios, London
- Genre: Rock
- Length: 40:20
- Language: Japanese
- Label: Eastworld / EMI
- Producer: Hiroaki Takei, Akira Tanaka

Show-Ya chronology
Masquerade Show (1985)	Queendom (1986)

Singles from Masquerade Show
- 1. "Suteki Ni Dancing (Coke Is It)" / "Au Revoir (Last Scene)" Released: 31 August 1985

Masquerade Show is the debut album of the Japanese rock group Show-Ya. The album was released on 6 September 1985 in Japan. Its release was preceded by the pop single "Suteki ni Dancing" (trans. Dancing Is Great), used for an advertising campaign by Coca-Cola.

== Overview ==
The single "Suteki ni Dancing", used for the TV spots of the Coca-Cola campaign, gave the band a wide and immediate visibility all over Japan. A Coca-Cola can is depicted on the back cover of the album to remind the link to the band's sponsor. The album, mixed at Abbey Road Studios in London by Haydn Bendall (Camel, Alan Parsons Project, Kate Bush, Toyah) and the Japanese media coverage of the event, pushed the band to an even higher level of popularity. During their sojourn in London, Show-Ya had the occasion to play live in the clubs that usually hosted bands from the new wave of British heavy metal scene, making their name known to the British musical press.

The album presents a large variety of compositions, ranging from pop rock to hard rock, showing the classic rock influences of the young musicians but a sound not yet distinctive. Mixing the album, a large emphasis was generally given to vocals and keyboards, keeping the volume of the guitars very low. The result is a distinctly soft tone, quite different from the loud live performances of the band. "Talon of King" is an adaptation of a song from Japanese metal band Helen and "Touch Me" is a cover of The Doors' song from the album The Soft Parade. The title of the song "Touch Down" was adopted by Show-Ya's official fan club.

== Track listing ==
Side one

1. "Touch Down" (Show-Ya) – 4:51
2. "Mado" (マドゥー) (Tetsurō Oda, Keiko Terada) – 4:23
3. "Talon of King" (ターロン・オブ・キング（爪王）) (HELEN, Terada & HELEN) – 4:46
4. "Au Revoir (Last Scene)" (Miki Nakamura, Terada) – 5:21

Side two

5. "Mind Collection" (Kenshi Arai, Terada) – 4:47
6. "Actor" (Yū Izawa, Terada) – 4:41
7. "Touch Me" (Robby Krieger) – 3:12
8. "Masquerade" (Arai, Terada) – 4:05
9. "Hurry Up" (Show-Ya) – 4:14

== Personnel ==
=== Band members ===
- Keiko Terada – vocals
- Miki Igarashi – guitars, guitar synth, backing vocals
- Miki Nakamura – keyboards, backing vocals
- Satomi Senba – bass
- Miki Tsunoda – drums and electronic percussion

=== Production ===
- Hiroaki Takei, Akira Tanaka – producers
- Kenshi Arai, Takayuki Negishi, Hide Inoura & Show-Ya – arrangements
- Seizi Yamazaki – engineer
- Fujieda Darling Godwin – assistant engineer
- Haydn Bendall – remix engineer

== See also ==
- 1985 in Japanese music
