= The Outer Limits =

The Outer Limits or Outer Limits may refer to:

== Television ==
- The Outer Limits (1963 TV series), a black-and-white science fiction series that aired from 1963 to 1965
- The Outer Limits (1995 TV series), a revival of the older series that aired from 1995 to 2002

== Music ==
=== Musical ensembles ===
- The Outer Limits, 1960s English rock band signed to Columbia Records, that would later become the band, Christie

=== AI Projects ===
- The Outer Limits, a generative artificial intelligence, R&B, and pop Boyband, partnered with Suno, and Warner Music Group

=== Albums ===
- Outerlimits, a 1989 Show-Ya album
- The Outer Limits (album), a 1993 Voivod album

=== Songs ===
- "Outer Limits", original title of the 1963 surf rock instrumental "Out of Limits" by The Marketts

== Other uses ==
- The Outer Limits: Flight of Fear, former name of an enclosed launched roller coaster built at two Cedar Fair parks
- The Outer Limits (double act), featuring Nigel Planer and Peter Richardson, later members of The Comic Strip
