= Hard Way Tour 1991 =

Live album

Live album by Show-Ya
- Released: 12 April 1991
- Recorded: 2 February 1991,
- Venue: Nagoya-Shi Public Hall, Nagoya, Japan
- Genre: Hard rock, heavy metal
- Length: 59:57
- Language: Japanese
- Label: Eastworld / EMI
- Producer: Atsuhiro Sakamoto, Yasuyuki Moriyama

Show-Ya chronology
Hard Way (1990)	Hard Way Tour 1991 (1991)	Show-Ya Greatest 1985–1990 (1991)

Hard Way Tour 1991

Video by Show-Ya
- Released: 10 May 1991
- Recorded: 2 February 1991
- Venue: Nagoya-Shi Public Hall, Nagoya, Japan
- Genre: Hard rock, heavy metal
- Length: 50 min.
- Label: EMI Music Japan
- Director: Takeshi Yamaguchi
- Producer: Masayasu Masuzawa

Show-Ya chronology
Distance on Their Way (1991)	Hard Way Tour 1991 (1991)	20th Anniversary Live (2005)

Hard Way Tour 1991 is the second live album released by the Japanese hard rock band Show-Ya. It is the last record issued with the original lead singer Keiko Terada. The show was videotaped and release in VHS and LaserDisc in 1991, with a different track listing than the album. The album reached position No. 22 in the Japanese Oricon chart.

== Track listings ==
=== Live album ===
1. "Metallic Woman" – 6:42
2. "Life Is Dancing" – 5:24
3. "Watashi Wa Arashi" (私は嵐) – 4:14
4. "Blue Rose Blues" – 5:38
5. "Naze" (何故) – 5:05
6. "Keyboard Solo / Battle Express" – 7:47
7. "Make It Up – Dounikashite Yo –" (Make It Up ―どうにかしてよ―) – 7:26
8. "Look at Me!" – 4:19
9. "Fairy" – 4:11
10. "Gambling" (ギャンブリング) – 3:24
11. "Genkai Lovers" (限界 Lovers) – 4:47

=== DVD track listing ===
1. "Metallic Woman"
2. "Life Is Dancing"
3. "Watashi Wa Arashi" (私は嵐)
4. "Blue Rose Blues"
5. "Renegade"
6. "Look at Me!"
7. "Fairy"
8. "Gambling" (ギャンブリング)
9. "Sono Ato De Koroshitai" (その後で殺したい)
10. "Genkai Lovers" (限界 Lovers)

== Personnel ==
=== Band members ===
- Keiko Terada – vocals
- Miki Igarashi – guitars
- Miki Nakamura – keyboards
- Satomi Senba – bass
- Miki Tsunoda – drums

=== Production ===
- Atsuhiro Sakamoto – producer, engineer
- Yasuyuki Moriyama – producer
