= Turn Over =

Live album by Show-Ya
- Released: 25 May 1988
- Recorded: From 3 April 1987 to 7 February 1988
- Genre: Rock, hard rock
- Length: 60:48
- Language: Japanese
- Label: Eastworld / EMI
- Producer: Show-Ya

Show-Ya chronology
Immigration (1987)	Turn Over (1988)	Glamour (1988)

Turn Over is the first live album of the Japanese rock group Show-Ya. It is a collection of live songs recorded during concerts from the "Date Line Tour" and "Immigration Tour" in 1987, and from the "Tour of the Immigrant" in 1988. The album reached position No. 36 in the Japanese Oricon chart.

== Track listing ==
1. "S・T・O・P (But I Can't...)" – 4:35
2. "Mizu no Naka no Toubousha" (水の中の逃亡者) – 3:57
3. "Shidokenaku Emotion" (しどけなくエモーション) – 4:21
4. "Mr. J" – 4:27
5. "Origination" – 0:48
6. "Kodoku no Meiro (Labyrinth)" (孤独の迷路（ラビリンス）) – 5:06
7. "Fairy" – 5:04
8. "Hurry Up" – 8:15
9. "One Way Heart" – 4:10
10. "You Turn Me Over" – 4:31
11. "Toki Wo Koete" (時を越えて) – 7:04
12. "Sono Ato De Koroshitai" (その後で殺したい) – 4:20
13. "Narcissist" (ナルシスト) – 4:10

== Personnel ==
=== Band Members ===
- Keiko Terada – vocals
- Miki Igarashi – guitars
- Miki Nakamura – keyboards
- Satomi Senba – bass
- Miki Tsunoda – drums

== See also ==
- 1988 in Japanese music
