= Trade Last =

Studio album by Show-Ya
- Released: 4 February 1987
- Recorded: Toshiba Studio, Onkio Haus, Tokyo, Japan
- Genre: Rock
- Length: 47:34
- Language: Japanese
- Label: Eastworld / EMI
- Producer: Show-Ya, Yasushi Akimoto

Show-Ya chronology
Ways (1986)	Trade Last (1987)	Immigration (1987)

Singles from Trade Last
- 1. "Sono Ato De Koroshitai" / "Yoru Ga Kuru Made Nemuretai" Released: 22 January 1987

Trade Last is the fourth album of the Japanese rock group Show-Ya. The album was released on 4 February 1987 in Japan. All the lyrics were written by Yasushi Akimoto and half of the music by Kyōhei Tsutsumi. The musical arrangements were done by Makoto Matsushita.

== Overview ==
By the year 1987, the band had acquired a loyal fan base and was able to fill up mid-sized arenas with their live shows in Japan. Their TV appearances were also more frequent and demanding, requiring a more professional approach to the musical business. This important step in the band's career needed money to be invested in new stage sets, personnel, costumes and equipment, which came out of a two-album contract with Yasushi Akimoto's Sold Out Productions. Akimoto was already a well-known author, lyricist and TV producer, deeply involved in the Japanese idol phenomenon. He was executive producer of the album, providing both the lyrics for all the songs and the highly professional staff, including arranger Makoto Matsushita and composer Kyōhei Tsutsumi. For the first time lead singer Keiko Terada did not have any writing duty on the album, but sang only lyrics written by someone else and dealing with a larger range of topics than in the previous albums. For example, the song "Visconti no Shouzou" is centered on the figure of Italian movie director Luchino Visconti. Akimoto's writing takes advantage of the band's rock and roll grit, and strays into "edgy" topics. ”Mou Friend wa Iranai" ("Don't need friends any more") evokes the complicated feelings of loathing, nostalgia and regret upon returning to a discarded, hated home town ("kirai-na matchi") after a decade. The speaker in "Sono Ato de Koroshitai" ("After it's over, I want to kill you") is a mistress expressing her desire to murder her playboy lover, to have him all to herself, hinting at that this is to take place after sex.

The image of the band was largely refined with new costumes and choreography and in particular Terada's image changed, leaving behind her almost boyish look for a more feminine and seductive appearance.

The top-notch production of the album preserved the strong points of the band's music, reserving great attention to vocal performances and enhancing the commercial appeal of the recording. The last track "Chikasuidou no Tsuki" is usually used as farewell song at the end of Show-Ya's live shows.

During the tour supporting the album, the concert of 3 April 1987 at the Nakano Sun Plaza in Tokyo was recorded for Date Line, Show-Ya's first live VHS.

== Track listing ==
Side one

1. "Ame no Knife" (雨のナイフ) (Kyōhei Tsutsumi, Yasushi Akimoto) – 4:20
2. "Mou Friend Wa Iranai" (もうフレンドはいらない) (Satomi Senba, Akimoto) – 4:12
3. "Visconti no Shouzou" (ヴィスコンティの肖像) (Miki Nakamura, Akimoto) – 3:51
4. "Sono Ato De Koroshitai" (その後で殺したい) (Tsutsumi, Akimoto) – 4:11
5. "Thermostat no Hitomi" (サーモスタットの瞳) (Tsutsumi, Akimoto) – 5:59

Side two

6. "Narcissist" (ナルシスト) (Miki Igarashi, Akimoto) – 4:11
7. "Yoru Ga Kuru Made Nemuritai" (夜が来るまで眠りたい) (Tsutsumi, Akimoto) – 4:29
8. "'Shitagokoro' Ga Tomaranai" ('Shitagokoro' が止まらない) (Senba & Miki Tsunoda, Akimoto) – 4:14
9. "Souutsu na Ballerina" (躁鬱なバレリーナ) (Tsutsumi, Akimoto) – 4:41
10. "Chikasuidou no Tsuki" (地下水道の月) (Nakamura, Akimoto) – 7:26

== Personnel ==
=== Band members ===
- Keiko Terada – vocals
- Miki Igarashi – guitars
- Miki Nakamura – keyboards
- Satomi Senba – bass
- Miki Tsunoda – drums

=== Production ===
- Yasushi Akimoto (Sold Out Prod.) – executive producer
- Shinichi Yano – engineer
- Michael Zimmerling, Nobuo Maeda – remix engineers
- Makoto Matsushita – arrangements
- Atsushi Umehara – creative input

== See also ==
- 1987 in Japanese music
