= Naon no Yaon =

Music festival in Tokyo, Japan

- Genre: Rock, heavy metal, pop
- Dates: April 29 (currently)
- Locations: Hibiya Open-Air Concert Hall (Tokyo, Japan)
- Years active: 1987–1991, 2008, 2013–present
- Founders: Show-Ya
- Organizer: Masterworks / Life
- Website: naonnoyaon.net

Naon no Yaon (Japanese: NAONのYAON) is an annual all-female music festival held at Hibiya Open-Air Concert Hall in Tokyo, Japan's Hibiya Park. Created and "produced" by heavy metal band Show-Ya, performing artists and staff members are restricted to females, but attendance is open to everyone. (Note: Male cross-dressing act Hoshikuzu Scat performed at the 2013 and 2014 events.)

== History ==
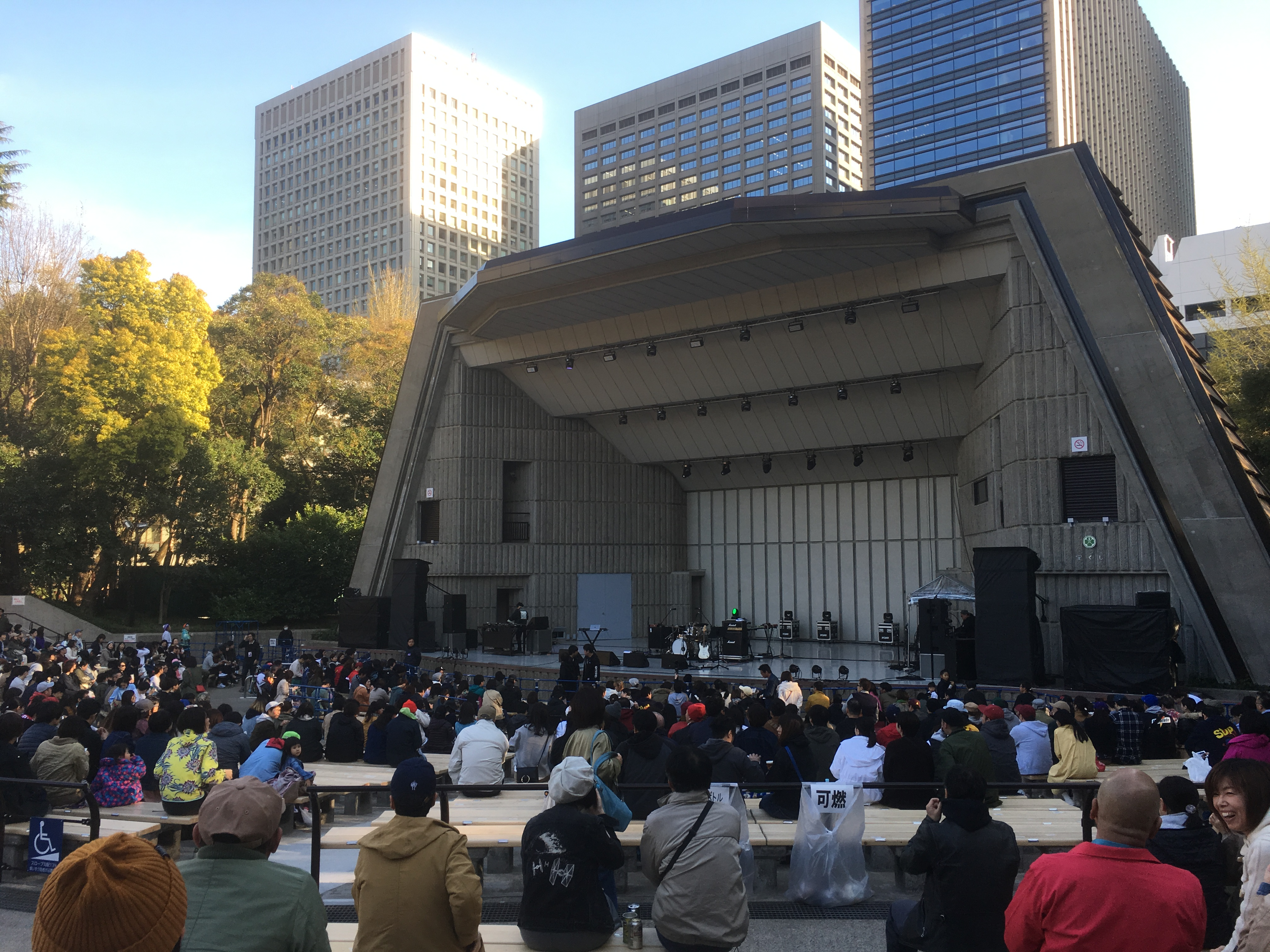
Naon no Yaon is held at Hibiya Open-Air Concert Hall, which is nicknamed "Yaon."

Naon no Yaon is produced by all-female band Show-Ya and each member recommends acts and helps decide the performers, but lead singer Keiko Terada is the main force behind the festival. She was inspired by The Alfee's performance to 100,000 people on the Tokyo waterfront in 1986. After Terada explained her thoughts on a radio program, Show-Ya's record company and agency got onboard with the idea. With the Equal Employment Opportunity Law enacted just that same year, the music industry was still male-dominated and all-female bands were rare. Whenever Show-Ya appeared on a music television show, they would ask fellow female talents who were there at the same time if they would be interested in participating in an all-female concert. Thus, the early Naon no Yaon events featured a wide variety of participants, including idols, actresses and professional wrestlers. However, in 2014 Terada said the number of female bands had increased significantly and that they had to put limits on the number of solo artists and bands they can have.

The first Naon no Yaon festival was held at Hibiya Open-Air Concert Hall (Hibiya Yagai Ongakudō) in Tokyo on September 20, 1987. The "naon" in the title was devised by reversing the syllables of "onna", the Japanese word for "woman", while "yaon" is a commonly used abbreviation of the venue's name. Naon no Yaon was held at the same concert hall in September annually for five years; from 1987 until 1991, the year Terada left Show-Ya. In addition to the host band, Princess Princess performed almost every year. Ann Lewis, Nokko, and Minako Honda are some of the other musical acts that performed during the original run of the festival.

After 17 years, the sixth Naon no Yaon was held on April 29, 2008. A special act composed of former members of the disbanded bands Princess Princess and Zone was widely advertised for the event. Nanase Aikawa, Jill from Personz, and Yu-ki from TRF were some of the other performers. Attended by an audience of 3,000, the event lasted 5 hours and featured 61 people in total, all of whom appeared on stage to perform "Toriaezu Rock 'n' Roll" by Carmen Maki & Oz as the final song. A concert DVD was released in October 2008.

Naon no Yaon was revived in 2013 in conjunction with the 90th anniversary of Hibiya Open-Air Concert Hall. The festival has been held at the venue on April 29 annually since. An exception being the 2016 festival, which took place on June 12. In 2015, a summer edition of Naon no Yaon was held on August 23 after the normal festival. The 2020 edition was cancelled due to the COVID-19 pandemic in Japan. Naon no Yaon 2021 was held without an in-person audience due to the continued pandemic, but became the first to be livestreamed worldwide. Due to the renovation of Hibiya Open-Air Concert Hall, it was announced that the 2025 festival would be the last at the venue. The following year's installment is scheduled to be held at Yokohama Buntai in Yokohama.

== Event history ==
Date	Select performers	Notes
September 20, 1987	Show-Ya, Princess Princess, Carmen Maki, Hidemi Ishikawa, Jun Miho	
September 11, 1988	Show-Ya, Princess Princess, Minako with Wild Cats, Ann Lewis, Nokko, Sheena, You	
September 17, 1989	Show-Ya, Princess Princess, Nokko, Kyoko, Kaori Tsuchiya	
September 15 and 16, 1990	Show-Ya, Ann Lewis, Takako Shirai, Yuiko Tsubokura, Pink Sapphire, Mami Yamase, Ruriko Kubō	The only two-day edition
September 15, 1991	Show-Ya, Princess Princess, Linda Yamamoto, Shima-chang, Steffanie	
April 29, 2008	Show-Ya, Nanase Aikawa, Yu-ki, Scandal, Nao Nagasawa, Maria, Dream	
April 29, 2013	Show-Ya, Shoko Nakagawa, Anna Tsuchiya, Aya Hirano, Destrose, Cyntia, Lovendor	
April 29, 2014	Show-Ya, Chisato Moritaka, Kavka Shishido, Gacharic Spin, Yoko Yazawa, Zwei, Miliyah Kato	
April 29, 2015	Show-Ya, Naomi Tamura, Ayumi Nakamura, Kamen Joshi, Pink Sapphire, Saki, Mie	
August 23, 2015	Show-Ya, Junko Yagami, Go-Bang's, Silent Siren, Mary's Blood, Chelsy	Special summer edition titled "Naon no Yaon 2015 ~Summer~"
June 12, 2016	Show-Ya, Nanase Aikawa, Kyoko, Gacharic Spin, Cyntia, Band-Maid, Zwei	
April 29, 2017	Show-Ya, Ai Haruna, Kahoru Kohiruimaki, Silent Siren, Mary's Blood, Cyntia, Li-sa-X	
April 29, 2018	Show-Ya, Yū Hayami, Shoko Aida, Yuki Koyanagi, Starmarie, Doll$Boxx	
April 29, 2019	Show-Ya, Yu-ki, Mariko Nagai, LiLiCo, Mary's Blood, Girlfriend, Yashiro	
~~April 29, 2020~~	~~Show-Ya, Ayumi Nakamura, Nanase Aikawa~~	Cancelled due to the COVID-19 pandemic
April 29, 2021	Show-Ya, Yuki Katsuragi, Naomi Tamura, The Coinlockers, Nemophila, LAZYgunsBRISKY	No in-person audience due to the COVID-19 pandemic
April 29, 2022	Show-Ya, Maki Ohguro, Kyoko, Chai, Bridear, Yoyoka, Hagane	
April 29, 2023	Show-Ya, Chiaki, Rika Matsumoto, Anna Tsuchiya, Lonesome Blue, Miki Ōtake	
May 18, 2024	Show-Ya, Junko Yagami, Naomi Tamura, Silent Siren, Gacharic Spin, Trident	
April 29, 2025	Show-Ya, Ayumi Nakamura, Nanase Aikawa, Yuki Koyanagi, Norma Jean, Risky Melody, Hagane, Nemophila	

== Related events ==
Show-Ya and Terada have hosted several different musical events that are similar to Naon no Yaon. Show-Ya disbanded in 1998, but Terada had re-signed with the office that managed them around that same time. She said that the staff told her how they had enjoyed Naon no Yaon and asked her to revive the event. This resulted in a one-off edition titled "NAON NO NAON" that was held at the live house Club Citta in Kawasaki, Kanagawa in 1999. In 2009, Naon no Salon (NAONのSALON) was held at Makuhari Messe on January 10 as part of the Tokyo Auto Salon. Nishidera Minoru, a trio consisting of Terada, Minoru Niihara and Masafumi Nishida (Earthshaker), held Hard na Yaon (HARDなYAON) at Hibiya Open-Air Concert Hall on April 29, 2009. It featured hard rock acts, including the trio's main bands, and was not limited to females. In 2011, Show-Ya produced the Muon no Yaon (MUONのYAON) charity event at Hibiya Open-Air Concert Hall on May 7, where admission was free but donations encouraged to aid recovery from the 2011 Tōhoku earthquake and tsunami. The "muon" in the title relates the acoustic nature of the event and how the power was "not on"; the Japanese word "mu" can be translated as "not", while "on" is used as the common English word. With the revival of Naon no Yaon in 2013, Show-Ya started the annual Cute Girls Live ~Road to Naon no Yaon~ competition to select opening acts for each year. Competitors must be female and under the age of 25.

The creator of Women's Power, a similar female-centered music festival held annually, acknowledged the influence of Naon no Yaon, and the event was looked at as trying to fill the gap left by Naon no Yaon's discontinuation in 1991.

After taking part in a similar performance at Naon no Yaon 2017, Mary's Blood guitarist Saki organized the World Guitar Girls Collection project which features several female rock guitarists playing famous songs in instrumental medley format.

When Naon no Yaon 2020 was cancelled due to the COVID-19 pandemic, the spin-off Show-Ya to Naon (SHOW-YAとNAON) was held twice in its place. Aside from Show-Ya, the first event on July 22 only featured Nanase Aikawa, but the second on September 19 included several different acts. Terada also livestreamed a concert with Gacharic Spin and Nemophila on November 14 as a substitute for the cancellation.
