= Queendom (Show-Ya album) =

Studio album by Show-Ya
- Released: 1 March 1986
- Studio: Take One Studio, Tokyo, Japan, Abbey Road Studio, London
- Genre: Rock
- Length: 44:35
- Language: Japanese
- Label: Eastworld / EMI
- Producer: Akira Tanaka, Kinji Yoshino

Show-Ya chronology
Masquerade Show (1985)	Queendom (1986)	Ways (1986)

Singles from Queendom
- 1. "Shidokenaku Emotion" / "You Can Dance" Released: 1 February 1986

Queendom is the second album of the Japanese rock group Show-Ya. The album was released on 1 March 1986 in Japan.

== Overview ==
Show-Ya's second album was recorded with less external pressure than their debut album Masquerade Show and presents only songs composed and arranged by the band. The album was again mixed at Abbey Road Studios in London by Haydn Bendall. The band shoot their first video clip for the single "Shidokenaku Emotion".

In this work the sound of the band is more identifiable and shows in many songs a powerful hard rock feel, with the strong interaction between keyboards and guitars that will become a characteristic feature of the band. However, Terada's romantic lyrics and the acerbic looks of the costumed musicians seem to pigeonhole this work as a pop-rock album, in the vein of Princess Princess similar products.

== Track listing ==
Side one

1. "Broken My Heart" (Miki Nakamura, Keiko Terada) – 4:53
2. "Mr. J" (Miki Tsunoda, Terada) – 3:35
3. "In the Night" (Miki Igarashi, Terada) – 4:50
4. "Secret" (シークレット) (Nakamura, Terada) – 3:43
5. "Toki Wo Koete" (時を越えて) (Igarashi, Terada) – 5:52

Side two

6. "Shidokenaku Emotion" (しどけなくエモーション) (Nakamura, Reiko Yukawa) – 4:10
7. "Again" (Nakamura, Terada) – 4:01
8. "Silent Vision" (サイレント ヴィジョン) (Nakamura, Terada) – 5:13
9. "Fire" (Igarashi, Terada) – 5:04
10. "I Can Tell You" (Nakamura) – 3:14

== Personnel ==
=== Band members ===
- Keiko Terada – vocals
- Miki Igarashi – guitars
- Miki Nakamura – keyboards
- Satomi Senba – bass
- Miki Tsunoda – drums

=== Production ===
- Akira Tanaka – producer
- Kinji Yoshino – co–producer
- Daisuke Nakayama – engineer
- Haydn Bendall – remix engineer
- Takayuki Negishi – creative input
- Hiroaki Takei, Yukio Taguchi – supervisors

== See also ==
- 1986 in Japanese music
