= Donald Sanford =

Donald Sanford may refer to:

- Donald Sanford (sprinter) (born 1987), Israeli sprinter of American descent
- Donald S. Sanford (1918–2011), American television, radio and film screenwriter
