= White (Show-Ya album) =

Compilation album by Show-Ya
- Released: 10 December 1988
- Genre: Rock, hard rock
- Length: 55:53
- Language: Japanese
- Label: Eastworld / EMI

Show-Ya chronology
Glamour (1988)	White (1988)	Outerlimits (1989)

Singles from White
- 1. "3 Dome No Christmas" / "Go"

White is a compilation of songs by the Japanese hard rock group Show-Ya. The collection was released in 1988 in Japan. The album reached position No. 43 in the Japanese Oricon chart.

== Track listing ==
1. "Kodoku no Meiro (Labyrinth)" (孤独の迷路（ラビリンス）) – 4:50
2. "Blow Away" – 4:27
3. "Silent Vision" (サイレント・ヴィジョン) – 5:05
4. "3 Dome no Christmas" (3度目のクリスマス) – 4:30
5. "Everybody Someday" – 5:36
6. "Mizu no Naka Toubousha" (水の中の逃亡者) – 3:58
7. "Actor" – 4:38
8. "Toki Wo Koete" (時を越えて) – 5:35
9. "Chikasuidou no Tsuki" (地下水道の月) – 7:25
10. "Go" – 4:17
11. "Mr. J" – 3:32

== See also ==
- 1988 in Japanese music
