= Complete Best: Back Fire =

Greatest hits album by Show-Ya
- Released: 1992
- Genre: Rock, hard rock, heavy metal
- Length: 65:30
- Language: Japanese/English
- Label: EMI Japan

Show-Ya chronology
Show-Ya Greatest 1985–1990 (1991)	Complete Best: Back Fire (1992)	Touch the Sun (1995)

Complete Best: Back Fire is a compilation of songs and of the Japanese hard rock band Show-Ya. The collection was released in 1992 in Japan. This compilation contains the previously unpublished hard rock cover of The Beatles song "Blackbird", recorded in 1988.

== Track listing ==
1. "Genkai Lovers" (限界 Lovers) - 4:02
2. "I Gotta Your Love" - 3:46
3. "Life Is Dancing" - 4:43
4. "Sakebi" (叫び) - 4:26
5. "Aisazu ni Irarenai - Still Be Hangin' On" (愛さずにいられない - Still Be Hangin' On) - 4:59
6. "Shidokenaku Emotion" (しどけなくエモーション) - 4:06
7. "One Way Heart" - 4:17
8. "Sono Ato De Koroshitai" (その後で殺したい) - 4:11
9. "Fairy" - 3:57
10. "Fixer" (フィクサー) - 4:45
11. "What Do You Say?" - 4:32
12. "Watashi Wa Arashi" (私は嵐) - 4:06
13. "Blue Rose Blues" - 5:24
14. "Inori" (祈り) - 4:41
15. "Blackbird" (Lennon–McCartney) - 3:35

== Personnel ==
=== Band Members ===
- Keiko Terada - Vocals
- Miki Igarashi - Guitars
- Miki Nakamura - Keyboards
- Satomi Senba - Bass
- Miki Tsunoda - Drums
