= Hard Way =

Studio album by Show-Ya
- Released: 24 October 1990
- Recorded: June–July 1990
- Studios: Devonshier Studio, Hollywood, California, USA
- Genres: Hard rock, heavy metal
- Length: 54:07
- Language: Japanese
- Label: Eastworld / EMI
- Producers: Paul Winger, Beau Hill

Show-Ya chronology
Outerlimits (1989)	Hard Way (1990)	Hard Way Tour 1991 (1991)

Alternative censored CD cover

Singles from Hard Way
- 1. "Sakebi" / "Ubaitore" Released: 7 March 1990; 2. "Gambling" / "Naze" Released: 5 September 1990

Hard Way is the eighth album of the Japanese hard rock band Show-Ya. The album was recorded in Los Angeles, USA and produced by Beau Hill and by Kip Winger's brother Paul. It was released on 24 October 1990 and reached position No. 4 in Japan (Oricon Chart). All the lyrics were written by Yoshihiko Andō. This time all the musical arrangements were done by the band. It would be Show-Ya's last studio album with lead singer Keiko Terada. The track "Uchi ni Kaerou" was used as theme song for the anime OVA Cleopatra DC.

== Track listing ==
1. "Metallic Woman" (Miki Igarashi, Yoshihiko Andō) – 6:19
2. "Life Is Dancing" (Satomi Senba & Miki Tsunoda, Andō) – 4:41
3. "Switch Blade St." (Senba & Tsunoda, Andō) – 4:00
4. "Mashou" (魔性) (Miki Nakamura, Andō) – 4:47
5. "Naze" (何故) (Keiko Terada, Andō) – 6:31
6. "Make It Up – Dounikashite Yo –" (Make It Up ―どうにかしてよ―) (Igarashi, Andō) – 4:13
7. "Gambling" (ギャンブリング) (Igarashi, Andō) – 4:00
8. "Blue Rose Blues" (Terada, Andō) – 5:25
9. "Way You Rock Me" (Terada, Andō) – 3:27
10. "Uchi ni Kaerou" (うちにかえろう) (Terada, Andō) – 6:10
11. "Sakebi" (叫び) (Terada & Nakamura, Andō) – 4:27

== Personnel ==
=== Band members ===
- Keiko Terada – vocals
- Miki Igarashi – guitars
- Miki Nakamura – keyboards
- Satomi Senba – bass
- Miki Tsunoda – drums

=== Production ===
- Paul Winger – producer
- Beau Hill – executive producer
- Scott Gordon, Patrick D. Karamians, Paul Wertheimer – engineers
- Robert A. Vosgien – digital editing
- Ted Jensen – mastering at Sterling Sound, New York
- Yoshihiko Andō – lyrics

== See also ==
- 1990 in Japanese music
