= Glamour (album) =

Studio album by Show-Ya
- Released: 24 August 1988
- Studio: Music Inn Yamanakako Studio, Studio Sky, Media Burn Studio, Freedom Studio, Take One Studio, Gold Rush Studio, Tokyo, Japan; Ameraycan Studio, Hollywood, California
- Genre: Hard rock
- Length: 46:13
- Language: Japanese/English
- Label: Eastworld / EMI
- Producer: Show-Ya

Show-Ya chronology
Turn Over (1988)	Glamour (1988)	White (1988)

Singles from Glamour
- 1. "Aisazu Ni Irarenai - Still Be Hangin' On" / "Get Down" Released: 25 June 1988

Glamour is the sixth album of the Japanese hard rock band Show-Ya. The album was released on 24 August 1988. All musical arrangements are by Makoto Matsushita and Show-Ya. The single "Aisazu Ni Irarenai - Still Be Hangin' on" is Show-Ya's version of an unused demo from the recording sessions of Cheap Trick's Lap of Luxury album. The song is sung both in English and Japanese, with the lyrics translated by Keiko Terada. This album was mixed by Andy Johns in Los Angeles. It reached position No. 16 in the Japanese Oricon chart.

== Track listing ==
1. "I Gotta Your Love" (Keiko Terada) – 3:46
2. "The Wind" (Miki Igarashi, Terada) – 3:30
3. "Aisazu ni Irarenai - Still Be Hangin' On" (愛さずにいられない – Still Be Hangin' On) (Jonathan Cain & Rick Nielsen, trans. Terada) – 3:39
4. "Come On!" (Show-Ya, Terada) – 4:11
5. "Dakareta Mama" (抱かれたまま) (Miki Nakamura, Terada) – 4:25
6. "Keep Me in Your Heart" (Tom Keifer) – 2:50
7. "Rock Train" (Satomi Senba & Miki Tsunoda) – 4:43
8. "Fixer" (フィクサー) (Terada) – 4:24
9. "Yoru no Sei Ja Nai" (夜のせいじゃない) (Terada) – 4:48
10. "Kagirinaku Haruka na Jiyuu E (Go Again)" (限りなくはるかな自由へ～Go Again～) (Igarashi, Terada) – 4:59
11. "We'll Still Be Hangin' On" (Jonathan Cain & Rick Nielsen) – 4:58

== Personnel ==
=== Band Members ===
- Keiko Terada – vocals
- Miki Igarashi – guitars
- Miki Nakamura – keyboards
- Satomi Senba – bass
- Miki Tsunoda – drums

=== Production ===
- Nobuo Maeda, Yoshikazu Nakabayashi – engineers
- Paul Wertheimer – engineer, mixing at Ameraycan Studio, Hollywood, California
- Ken Nakai, Micajah Ryan, Sachio Yotsumoto, Toshimi Nanseki – assistant engineers
- Andy Johns – mixing
- Yoichi Aikawa – mastering

== See also ==
- 1988 in Japanese music
