= Outerlimits =

Studio album by Show-Ya
- Released: 6 September 1989
- Recorded: June–July 1989
- Studio: Music Inn Yamanakano, Freedom Studio, Tokyo, Japan
- Genre: Hard rock, heavy metal
- Length: 47:31
- Language: Japanese
- Label: Eastworld / EMI
- Producer: Show-Ya

Show-Ya chronology
| White (1988) | Outerlimits (1989) | Hard Way (1990) |

Singles from Outerlimits
- 1. "Genkai Lovers" / "What Do You Say?" Released: 1 February 1989; 2. "Watashi Wa Arashi" / "Ai No Frustration" Released: 7 June 1989

Outerlimits is the seventh album of the Japanese female hard rock group Show-Ya. The album was released on 6 September 1989, in Japan. The album was mixed at the famous Cherokee Studios in California and was arranged by Masanori Sasaji and Show-Ya. Lyricist Yoshihiko Andō wrote most of the lyrics for the songs of the album. This is the band's best selling album, with more than 100,000 copies sold in Japan. The first single "Genkai Lovers" (限界 Lovers) sold more than 30,000 copies in Japan, being used for a commercial campaign.

== Reception and charts ==
Professional ratings
Review scores
| Source | Rating |
|---|---|
| AllMusic | 4/5 stars |

Alex Henderson in his review for AllMusic defined the Japanese album "well worth searching for" for every metalhead, comparing the songs of Show-Ya to the works of Ozzy Osbourne, Iron Maiden, Heart and Lita Ford.

The album was a huge success in Japan, reaching number three in the national charts (Oricon chart). The first single "Genkai Lovers" (限界 Lovers) sold more than 30,000 copies in Japan, while the second single "Watashi wa Arashi" (私は嵐) was the best-selling CD single of the band, reaching position No. 12 in the Oricon single chart.

== Track listing ==
1. "Out of Limits" (Miki Igarashi, Yoshihiko Andō) – 3:09
2. "Look at Me!" (Show-Ya, Keiko Terada & Andō) – 5:11
3. "Genkai Lovers" (限界 Lovers) (Terada & Igarashi, Andō) – 3:59
4. "Trouble" (Terada, Andō) – 4:06
5. "Yasei no Bara" (野性の薔薇) (Igarashi, Andō) – 5:31
6. "Inori" (祈り) (Terada, Terada & Andō) – 4:37
7. "Kaigenrei no Machi – Cry for the Freedom" (戒厳令の街 ／Cry for the Freedom) (Miki Nakamura, Andō) – 4:52
8. "Bad Boys" (Satomi Senba & Miki Tsunoda, Andō) – 3:58
9. "Watashi Wa Arashi" (私は嵐) (Terada, Andō) – 4:05
10. "Paranoia Paradise" (Senba & Tsunoda, Andō) – 3:19
11. "Battle Express" (Igarashi, Andō) – 4:31

== Personnel ==
=== Band members ===
- Keiko Terada – vocals
- Miki Igarashi – guitars
- Miki Nakamura – keyboards
- Satomi Senba – bass
- Miki Tsunoda – drums

=== Production ===
- Atsuhiro Sakamoto – engineer
- Toshimi Naseki – assistant engineer
- Paul Wertheimer – mixing at Cherokee Studios, Hollywood, California
- Bernie Grundman – mastering
- Masanori Sasaji – arrangements
- Yoshihiko Andō – lyrics

== See also ==
- 1989 in Japanese music
