= Immigration (album) =

Studio album by Show-Ya
- Released: 5 November 1987
- Studio: Music Inn Yamanakako, Take One Studio, Hi Tech Lab, Digital Studio, Tokyo, Japan
- Genre: Rock, hard rock
- Length: 47:28
- Language: Japanese
- Label: Eastworld / EMI
- Producer: Show-Ya

Show-Ya chronology
| Trade Last (1987) | Immigration (1987) | Turn Over (1988) |

Singles from Immigration
- 1. "Mizu no Naka no Toubousha" / "Fermata" Released: 25 May 1987; 2. "Kodoku no Meiro (Labyrinth)" / "Uso Da To Itte Yo, Moon Light" Released: 26 October 1987

Immigration is the fifth album of the Japanese rock group Show-Ya. The album was released on 5 November 1987 in Japan. Yasushi Akimoto and Kyōhei Tsutsumi worked together again in song composition. Makoto Matsushita arranged all the music, this time collaborating with the band. This album was mixed by Andy Johns in Los Angeles. Immigration peaked at position No. 12 in the Japanese Oricon chart.

== Track listing ==
Side one

1. "Dare Mo Wakara Nakute Ii (Toki no Wana)" (誰もわからなくていい ―時の罠―) (Miki Igarashi, Yasushi Akimoto) – 4:32
2. "Mizu no Naka no Toubousha (U.S.A. Version)" (水の中の逃亡者 (U.S.A.バージョン）) (Kyōhei Tsutsumi, Akimoto) – 3:59
3. "Free Birds" (Satomi Senba & Miki Tsunoda, Keiko Terada) – 3:54
4. "Uso Da To Itte Yo, Moon Light" (嘘だと言ってよMoon Light) (Tsutsumi, Akimoto) – 4:45
5. "3 Dome no Christmas" (3度目のクリスマス) (Tsutsumi, Akimoto) – 4:34

Side two

6. "Kodoku no Meiro (Labyrinth)" (孤独の迷路（ラビリンス）) (Tsutsumi, Akimoto) – 4:52
7. "Origination ～" (Miki Nakamura) – 0:47
8. "That Was Then, This Is Now" (Terada) – 4:03
9. "Be Quiet!!!" (Terada, Akimoto) – 6:52
10. "2000 Mairu no Koi" (2000マイルの恋) (Tsutsumi, Akimoto) – 5:02

CD edition bonus track

11. "Spider 23" (Terada) – 4:08

== Personnel ==
=== Band members ===
- Keiko Terada – vocals
- Miki Igarashi – guitars
- Miki Nakamura – keyboards
- Satomi Senba – bass
- Miki Tsunoda – drums

=== Production ===
- Yoshikazu Nakabayashi, Nobuo Maeda, Satoru Kawaguchi – engineers
- Yoshiaki Kennmochi, Nobuo Namie, Ikuo Honma – assistant engineers
- Andy Johns, Paul Wertheimer – mixing at Ameraycan Studio, Hollywood, California
- Terry Dunavan – mastering at Amigo Studios, Hollywood, California

== See also ==
- 1987 in Japanese music
