= Ways (album) =

Studio album by Show-Ya
- Released: 3 September 1986
- Studio: Smoky Studio, EMI Studios and Sedic Studio, Tokyo, Japan
- Genre: Rock
- Length: 43:06
- Language: Japanese
- Label: Eastworld / EMI
- Producer: Akira Tanaka

Show-Ya chronology
Queendom (1986)	Ways (1986)	Trade Last (1987)

Singles from Ways
- 1. "One Way Heart" / "Love Sick" Released: 22 August 1986

Ways is the third album of the Japanese rock group Show-Ya. The album was released on 3 September 1986 in Japan. All the songs were arranged by Tadashi Namba & Show-Ya.

== Overview ==
Despite being recorded only six months after their previous album Queendom, this album manifests a strong progression both in cohesiveness of the musicians and sound. In fact, the arrangements and compositions are tighter as the result of a real group effort, while the sound of the album is very similar to what could be heard at a Show-Ya's live show at that time. On the contrary, the two poppier songs on the album "S・T・O・P (But I Can't...)" and the single "One Way Heart" were not composed by the band and are almost harbingers of next album Trade Last's style. The single was also used as theme for a Japanese TV show. The hard rocker "Fairy" has since become a staple of every Show-Ya's live show.

== Track listing ==
Side one

1. "Shot" (Miki Nakamura, Keiko Terada) – 4:17
2. "Blow Away" (Miki Igarashi, Terada) – 4:28
3. "S・T・O・P (But I Can't...)" (Takahashi) – 4:05
4. "Get Up Higher" (Nakamura, Mary Stickles) – 3:34
5. "Over Now" (Nakamura, Terada) – 4:48

Side two

6. "One Way Heart" (Nobody, Masumi Kawamura) – 4:18
7. "Townscape" (Igarashi, Terada) – 4:25
8. "? Question" (? クエスション) (Satomi Senba & Miki Tsunoda, Terada) – 3:38
9. "Fairy" (Igarashi, Terada) – 3:56
10. "Everybody Someday" (Terada) – 5:37

== Personnel ==
=== Band members ===
- Keiko Terada – vocals
- Miki Igarashi – guitars
- Miki Nakamura – keyboards
- Satomi Senba – bass
- Miki Tsunoda – drums

=== Production ===
- Akira Tanaka – producer
- Takeshi Sukegawa – recording and mixing
- Ron Saint Germain – remix of "One Way Heart"
- Tatsuya Endou, Keisuke Hasegawa, Yasu Ito – recording engineers
- Tadashi Namba – creative input and arrangements

== See also ==
- 1986 in Japanese music
