= Progress (Show-Ya album) =

Studio album by Show-Ya
- Released: 30 September 2015
- Recorded: 2015
- Genre: Hard rock, heavy metal
- Length: 55:51
- Language: Japanese
- Label: Universal
- Producer: Masanori Sasaji

Show-Ya chronology
Glamorous Show II (2015)	Progress (2015)	Aurora (2017)

Progress is the 13th studio album by the Japanese hard rock band Show-Ya. It was released on 30 September 2015. The album includes two new versions of the 1989 hit single "Genkai Lovers", one featuring Japanese celebrity Namie Amuro.

== Track listing ==
1. "Genkai Lovers 2015" (限界 Lovers 2015) (Keiko Terada & Miki Igarashi, Yoshihiko Andō) – 4:31
2. "Byōsatsu Crazy Love" (秒殺Crazy Love) (Terada, Yukinojō Mori) – 4:15
3. "Hangyaku no Flash" (反逆のフラッシュ) (Terada, Mori) – 3:54
4. "Bring It Out!" (Miki Nakamura, Mori) – 4:58
5. "Always on Your Side" (Terada, Marcy & Terada) – 5:34
6. "Rock Love" (Terada, Yasushi Akimoto) – 3:42
7. "Medusa" (Satomi Senba & Miki Tsunoda, Mori) – 3:38
8. "A View After Dark" (Terada) – 4:18
9. "Sign" (Terada, Mori) – 3:56
10. "Show–yA" (Igarashi) – 5:42
11. "Kagirinaku Haruka na Jiyū E - Go Again" (限りなくはるかな自由へ~go again~) (Igarashi, Terada) – 7:16
12. "Genkai Lovers" (限界 Lovers) (Terada & Igarashi, Andō) – 4:07 (featuring Namie Amuro)

== Personnel ==
=== Band members ===
- Keiko Terada – vocals
- Miki Igarashi – guitars
- Miki Nakamura – keyboards
- Satomi Senba – bass
- Miki Tsunoda – drums
