= Show-Ya Twin Best =

Greatest hits album by Show-Ya
- Released: 27 November 1996
- Genre: Rock, hard rock, heavy metal
- Length: 138:05
- Language: Japanese
- Label: EMI Japan

Show-Ya chronology
Touch the Sun (1995)	Show-Ya Twin Best (1996)	This My Way (1998)

Show-Ya Twin Best is a double CD compilation of songs by the Japanese hard rock band Show-Ya. The compilation was released in 1996 in Japan and contains mainly songs from the first five albums of the band.

== Track listing ==
=== CD 1 ===
1. "Mizu no Naka no Toubousha" (水の中の逃亡者) – 3:59
2. "Kodoku no Meiro (Labyrinth)" (孤独の迷路（ラビリンス）) – 4:52
3. "One Way Heart" – 4:18
4. "Shidokenaku Emotion" (しどけなくエモーション) – 4:10
5. "Sono Ato De Koroshitai" (その後で殺したい) – 4:11
6. "Genkai Lovers" (限界 Lovers) – 3:59
7. "Au Revoir (Last Scene)" - 5:21
8. "Watashi Wa Arashi" (私は嵐) – 4:05
9. "Actor" – 4:41
10. "Talon of King" (ターロン・オブ・キング（爪王）) – 4:46
11. "Silent Vision" (サイレント ヴィジョン) – 5:13
12. "Fairy" – 3:56
13. "Everybody Someday" – 5:37

=== CD 2 ===
1. "Chikasuidou no Tsuki" (地下水道の月) – 7:26
2. "Thermostat no Hitomi" (サーモスタットの瞳) – 5:59
3. "Ame no Knife" (雨のナイフ) – 4:20
4. "3 Dome no Christmas" (3度目のクリスマス) – 4:34
5. "Hurry Up" – 4:14
6. "Masquerade" – 4:05
7. "Mr. J" – 3:35
8. "Toki Wo Koete" (時を越えて) – 5:52
9. "Blow Away" – 4:28
10. "S・T・O・P (But I Can't...)" – 4:05
11. "Yoru Ga Kuru Made Nemuretai" (夜が来るまで眠りたい) – 4:29
12. "Uso Da To Itte Yo, Moon Light" (嘘だと言ってよ Moon Light) – 4:45
13. "Sakebi" (叫び) – 4:27
14. "Touch Me" – 3:12
15. "Mind Collection" – 4:47
16. "Visconti no Shouzou" (ヴィスコンティの肖像) – 3:51
17. "Over Now" – 4:48

== Personnel ==
=== Band Members ===
- Keiko Terada - Vocals
- Miki Igarashi - Guitars
- Miki Nakamura - Keyboards
- Satomi Senba - Bass
- Miki Tsunoda - Drums
