= This My Way =

EP by Show-Ya
- Released: 2 February 1998
- Recorded: October 1997
- Genre: Hard rock, heavy metal
- Length: 29:14
- Language: Japanese
- Label: Creedence
- Producer: Show-Ya

Show-Ya chronology
Show-Ya Twin Best (1996)	This My Way (1998)	Show-Ya Golden Best (2002)

This My Way is a mini-album of the Japanese hard rock band Show-Ya. The album was released on 2 February 1998 in Japan and had limited distribution. It is Show-Ya's only recording with singer Yoshino.

== Track listing ==
1. "Blowin' You Tonight" (Miki Nakamura) – 3:53
2. "Let It Go" (Nakamura) – 5:15
3. "This My Way" (Nakamura, Yoshino) – 5:31
4. "Crazy Eyes" (Satomi Senba, Miki Tsunoda, Yoshino) – 4:00
5. "How Come...?" (Senba, Tsunoda) – 4:20
6. "Sunshine" (Nakamura) – 6:15

== Personnel ==
=== Band members ===
- Yoshino – vocals
- Miki Igarashi – guitars
- Miki Nakamura – keyboards
- Satomi Senba – bass
- Miki Tsunoda – drums
