= Hibiya Open-Air Concert Hall =

Outdoor theater in Hibiya Park, Tokyo, Japan

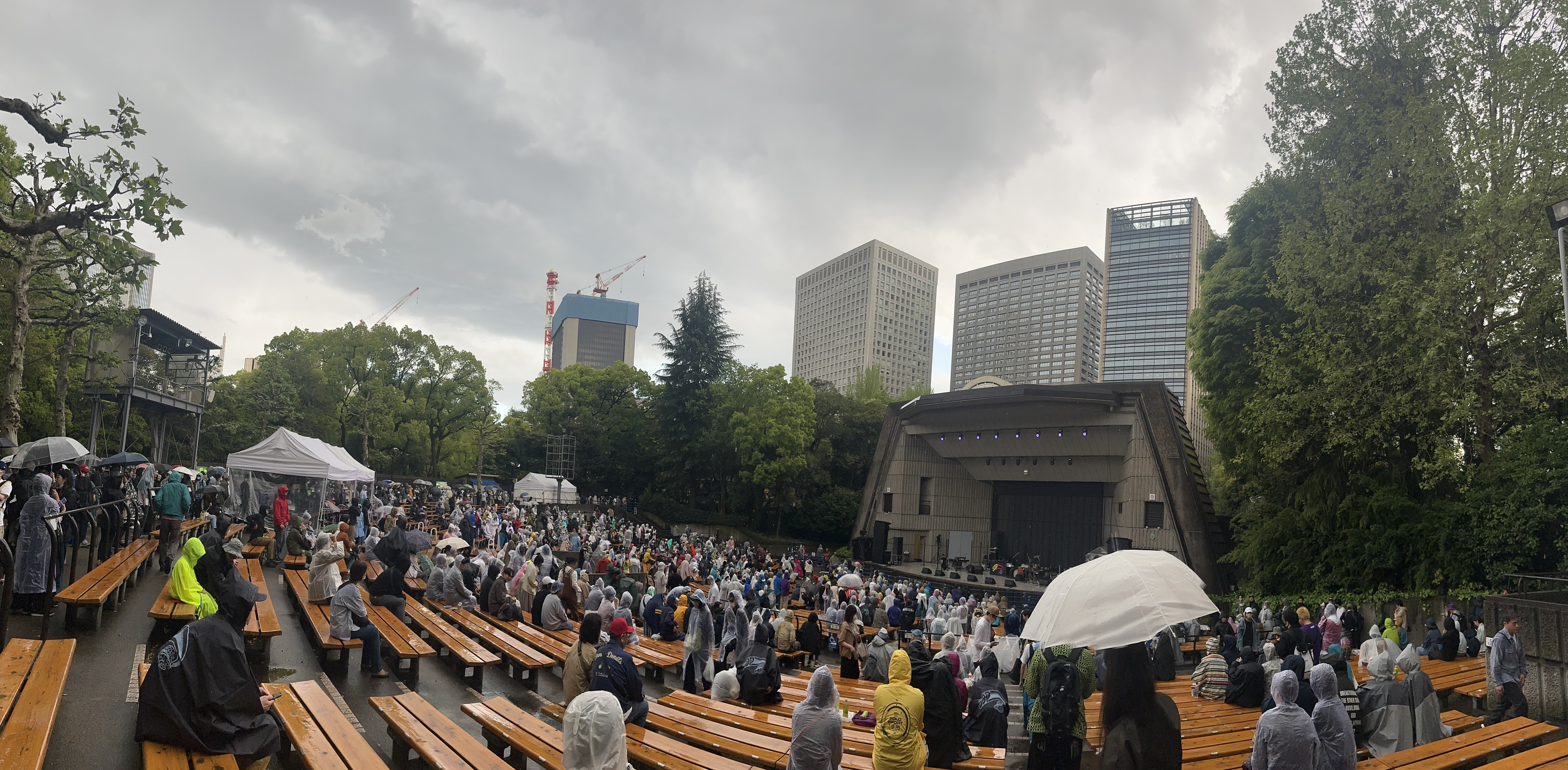
- Hibiya Open-Air Concert Hall on a rainy day in 2023
- Interactive map of Hibiya Open-Air Concert Hall
- Address: Chiyoda, Tokyo; Japan
- Location: Hibiya Park
- Coordinates: 35.67236°N 139.75403°E
- Owner: Tokyo Metropolitan Government
- Capacity: 3,053 (Large Hall); 1,000 (Small Hall)

Construction
- Opened: July 1923
- Renovated: 1954, 1983

Website
- Official website

The Hibiya Open-Air Concert Hall (Japanese: 日比谷野外音楽堂, Hepburn: Hibiya Yagai Ongakudō) is an outdoor music venue in Hibiya Park, located in Chiyoda, Tokyo, Japan. Owned and managed by the Tokyo Metropolitan Government, music events are limited to weekends and holidays between April and October out of consideration for the surrounding urban area. The venue closed for extensive rebuilding on October 1, 2025.

There are actually two concert halls - the smaller was erected during the Meiji era, and the larger was first built in the Taishō era. The larger venue is colloquially abbreviated to Yaon (野音). As the site of the first full-scale rock music concert in Japan, it is also referred to as the "Holy Land of Rock" (ロックの聖地, Rokku no Seichi).

== History and facilities ==
Hibiya Park, where the concert hall resides, was built in 1903 as Japan's first Western-style park. It was designed to incorporate three elements: Western flowers, Western food, and Western music. The last was achieved with the creation of the smaller music hall in 1905. It could accommodate about 1,000 people, but due to many Tokyo residents flocking to it to hear Western classical music, a larger facility that could accommodate more people was needed. The large music hall, colloquially known as Yaon, was first built in July 1923. Two months later, the smaller venue collapsed during the 1923 Great Kantō earthquake, but was rebuilt. Initially, Yaon was also used for other types of entertainment, such as boxing matches. Due to a lack of safety laws at the time, there were no capacity restrictions, and the venue is said to have attracted 5,000 to 10,000 people.

The large venue was closed in 1943 due to the Pacific War, and when the war ended, it was then under the control of the Supreme Commander for the Allied Powers for six years. When it was returned to Japan, the venue was rebuilt in August 1954. Between 1982 and August 1983 it was completely rebuilt again, as was the small hall. At this point, the small hall had 1,000 seats, while the large had 3,053 seats; 385 of which were standing, and 15 of which were wheelchair accessible. Only free concerts without artificial amplification are allowed at the small hall at a cost of ¥22,200 per day. Due to the impact of sound on the surrounding urban area, which includes the government district of Kasumigaseki directly behind the stage, music events at the larger hall are limited to Saturdays, Sundays, and holidays between April and October. Booking the venue is conducted by lottery, one year in advance.

The Tokyo government decided to rebuild Hibiya Open-Air Concert Hall in 2021. Plans include constructing a roof over the stage and the front row seats, and enhancing the backstage area as performers have complained the preparation and waiting areas are cramped and difficult to use. The venue closed on October 1, 2025.

== Notable events ==
A September 22, 1969, concert at Hibiya Open-Air Concert Hall is credited as the first full-scale rock event in Japan. Inspired by the Woodstock festival that he had attended in America one month earlier, guitarist Shigeru Narumo teamed up with Mickie Yoshino to organize a concert independent of record companies. Music journalist Toshio Nakamura explained that at the time it was difficult for musicians from different record companies and talent agencies to perform together, and speculated that one of the reasons why Yaon was chosen was because the public facility did not require the involvement of a promoter. Although officially named the New Rock Jam Concert, the event is more commonly known as the "10 Yen Concert". Because the organizers wanted to spread awareness of rock to as many people as possible, admission was set at only 10 yen at a time when the going rate was 1,000 yen. 1,200 people watched members of the Golden Cups, Yuya Uchida and the Flowers and Powerhouse perform at what is considered to be "the dawn of Japanese rock". The following month, Yuya Uchida sponsored the second 10 Yen Concert at Yaon on October 30, where acts such as Hiro Yanagida, the Happenings Four, the M, and Ai Takano performed to an audience of 5,000.

Beginning in the 1970s, many famous live albums have been recorded at Hibiya Open-Air Concert Hall. October 1971's Live!! The Golden Cups has been cited as the first. On April 13, 1975, during the final concert of the band Carol led by Eikichi Yazawa, fireworks following the last song caused the stage to catch fire and burn down. The concert was released as the live album Moetsukiru: Carol Last Live! later that year. Johnny, Louis & Char, a supergroup composed of Johnny Yoshinaga, Louise Louis Kabe and Char, held their first performance at Yaon on July 14, 1979. The free concert attracted an audience of 14,000. It was recorded and released as the live album Free Spirit later that year.

On April 19, 1987, three people were trampled to death as the audience rushed to the stage at the beginning of a concert by Laughin' Nose. One other person was seriously injured, while 19 sustained minor injuries. The Yomiuri Shimbun reported that 4,000 people were in the audience, despite the venue's capacity limit of about 3,000. According to the National Security Association in Shinjuku, after the accident, the concert industry strengthened security measures and fences were erected between the stage and the audience seats, with security guards stationed between them.

On September 20, 1987, Show-Ya held the first Naon no Yaon music festival at the venue. They held it annually for five years until 1991 and revived it for a one-off in 2008. In 2013, Naon no Yaon was fully resurrected in conjunction with the 90th anniversary of Hibiya Open-Air Concert Hall and has been held annually since.

Several special events were held in 2013 for the 90th anniversary of Hibiya Open-Air Concert Hall, including the revival of Naon no Yaon. Space Shower TV's Sweet Love Shower music festival, which was originally held at the venue from 1996 to 2006, returned to Yaon on May 3 and 4. 1969-Rock'n Hibiya Revival, which was seen as a tribute to the 10 Yen Concerts from 1969, was held on September 22. On October 6, the New Japan Philharmonic performed the first classical music concert at the venue in 50 years. The theme song for the 90th anniversary was "Today, Tomorrow & Forever" (～今日から未来へ～), written by Reiko Yukawa and composed by Mickie Yoshino.

In June 2018, Kyary Pamyu Pamyu hosted a concert commemorating the venue's 95th anniversary with Ken Hirai and Chai. The Hibya Music Festival (日比谷音楽祭, Hibiya Ongakusai) was started in 2019. It is an annual free music festival held at Hibiya Open-Air Concert Hall every June. Seiji Kameda is the executive chairman of the festival. The 2022 edition included a concert on Friday night with volume adjustments as an experiment towards expanding concerts at the venue to weekdays. In celebration of Hibiya Open-Air Concert Hall's 100th anniversary, around 40 performances were held at the venue between April and November 2023. Kameda was executive chairman of the anniversary project.

== Gallery ==
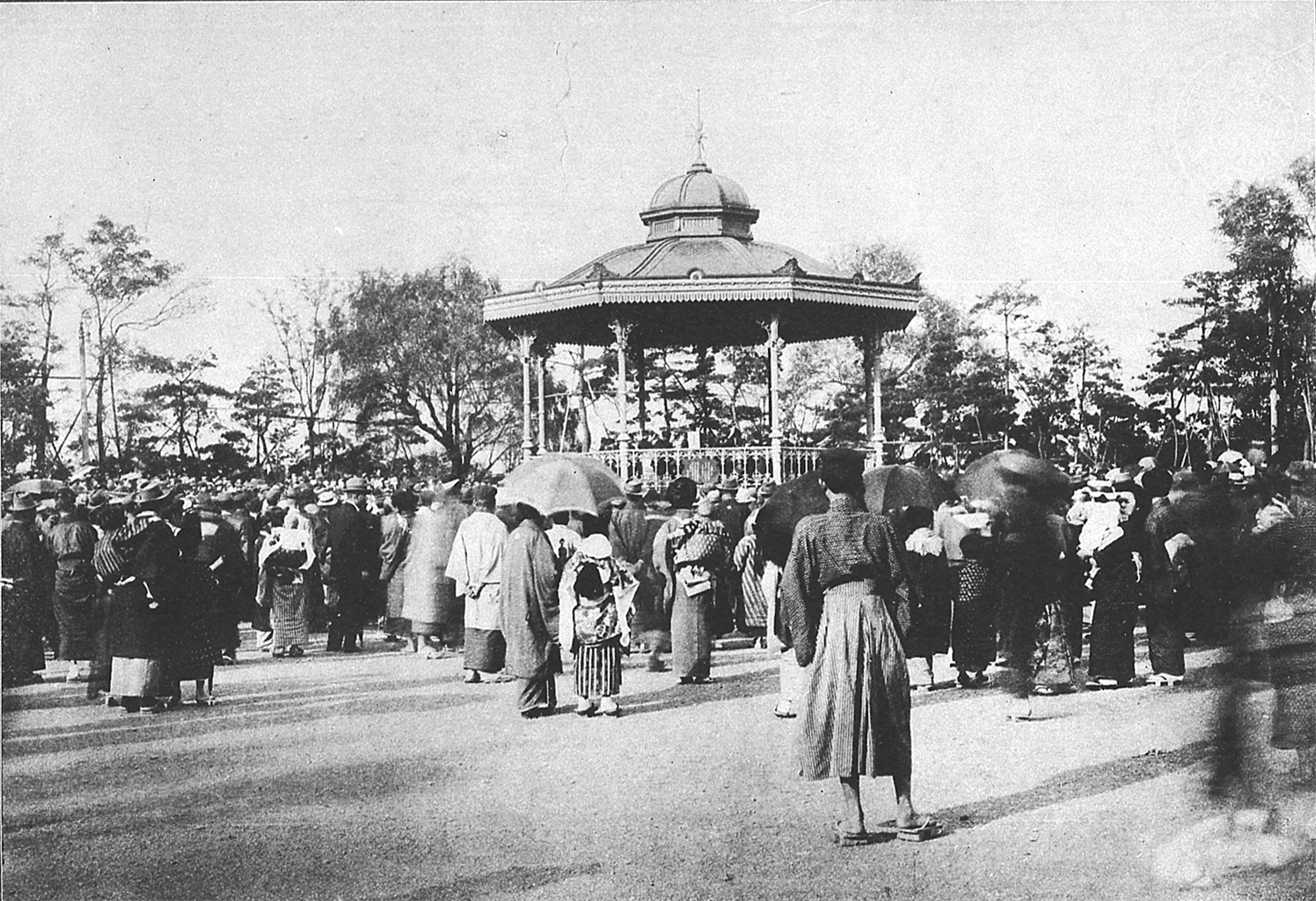
The first generation small concert hall c. 1909

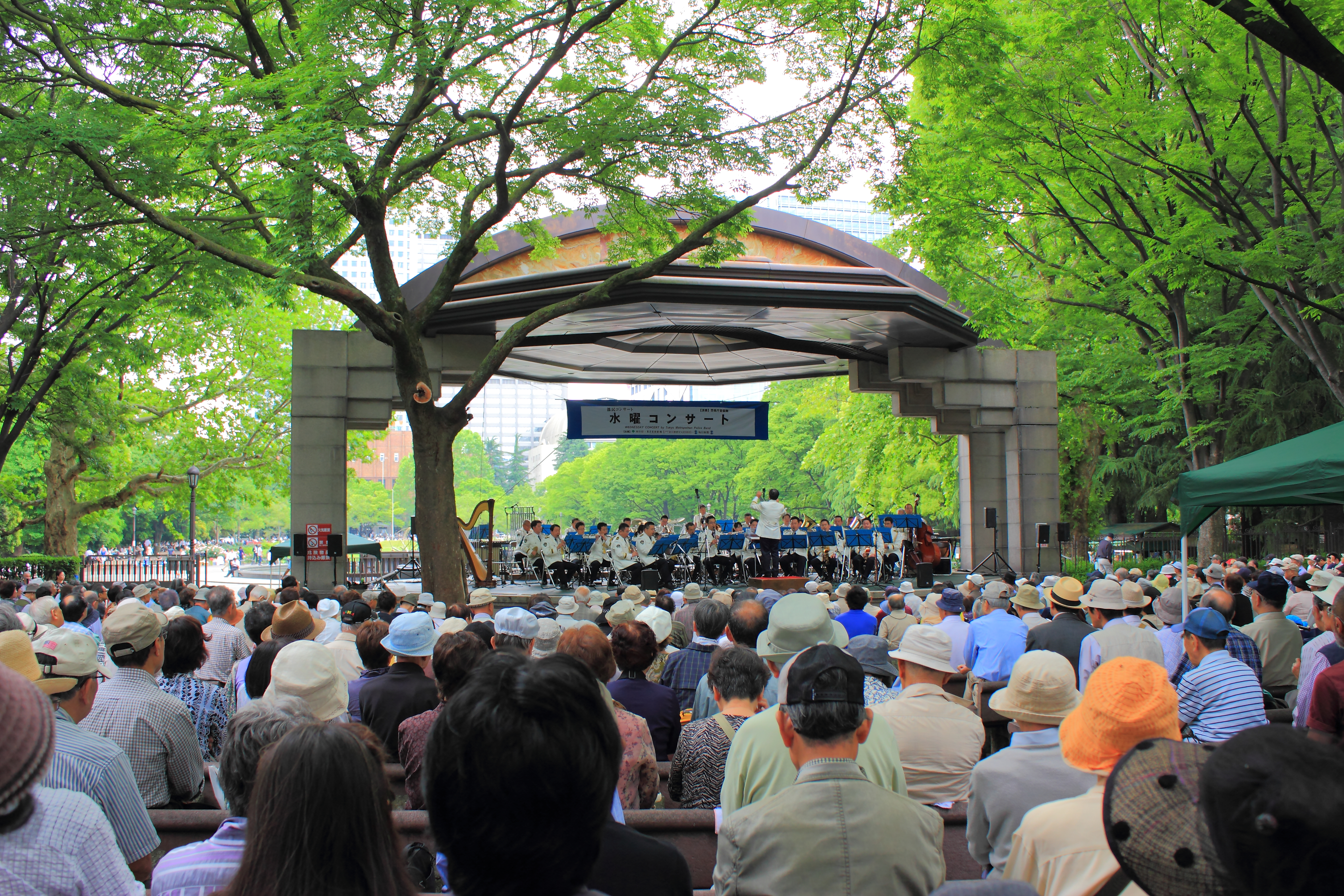
The third generation small hall in 2012

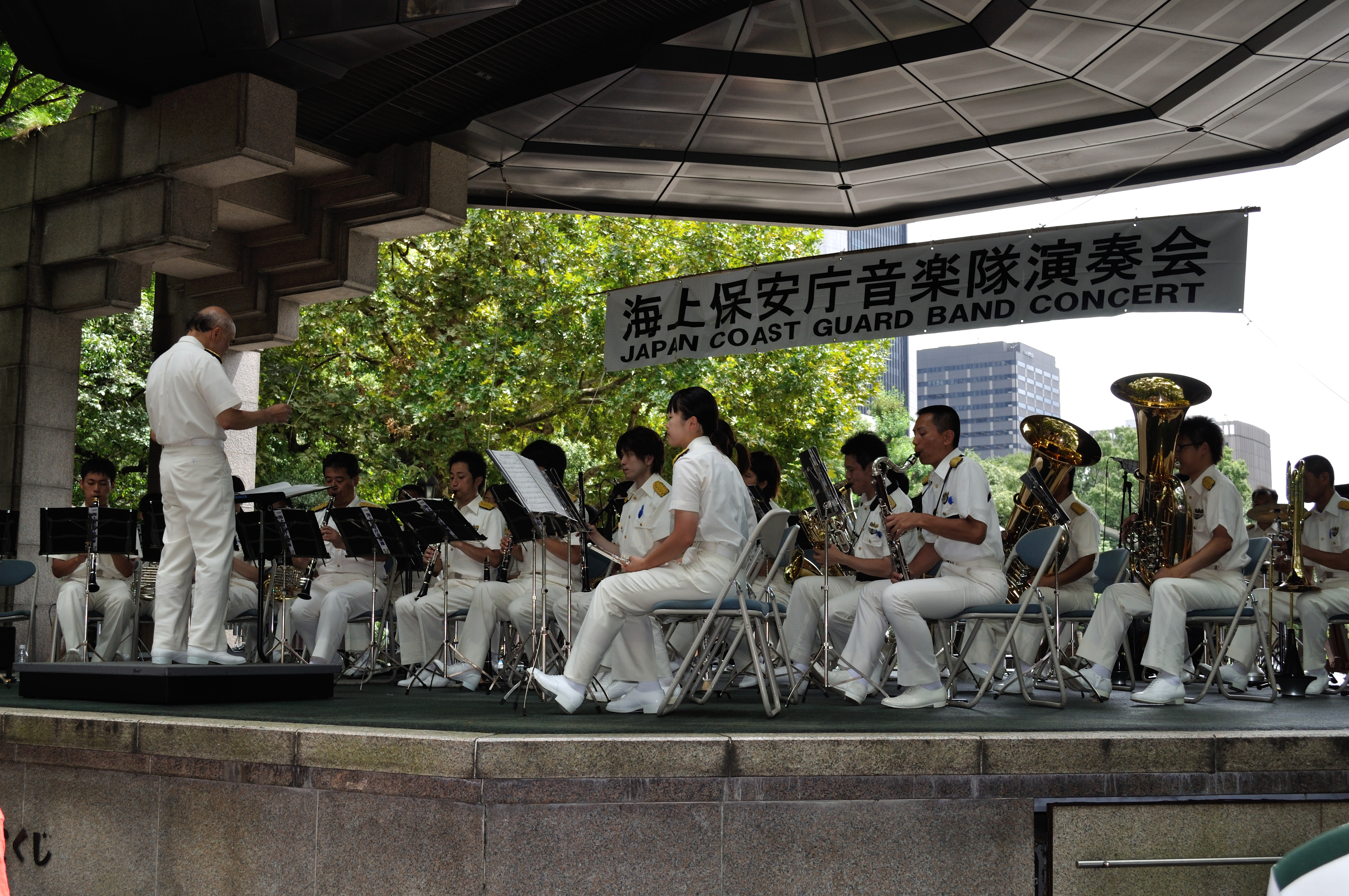
The Japan Coast Guard band performing at the small venue in July 2009

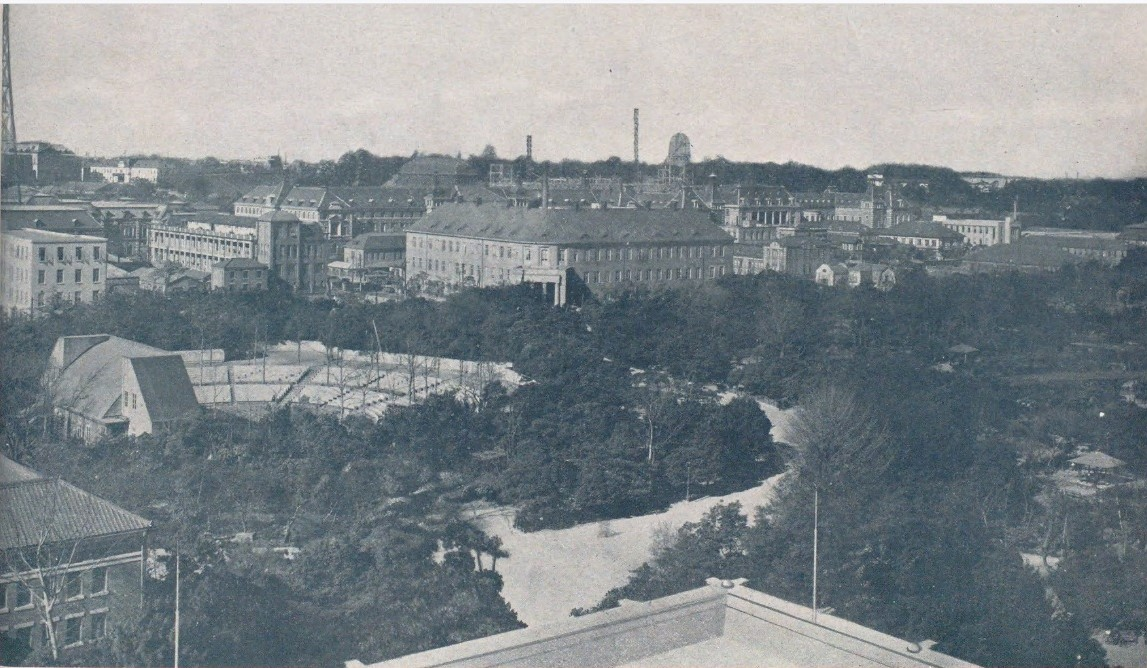
Rooftop view of the large concert hall, c. 1926 – c. 1930

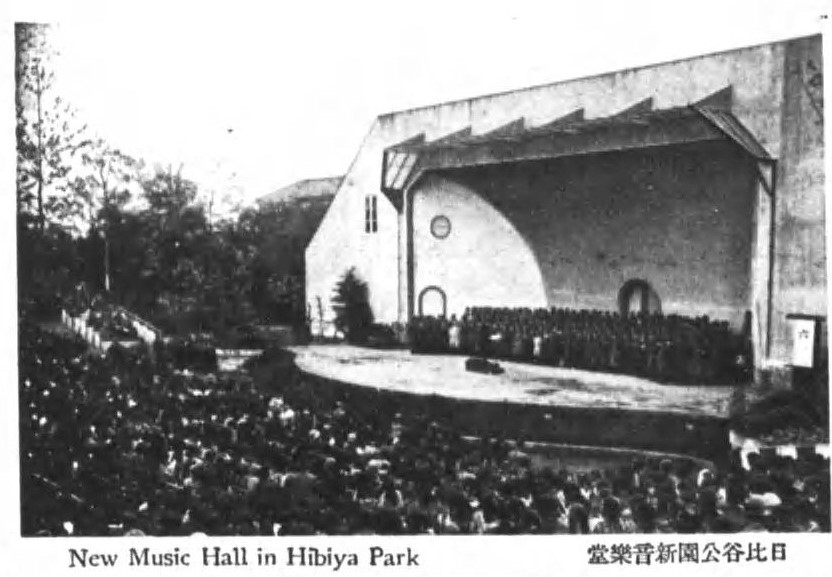
The first generation large hall, 1937

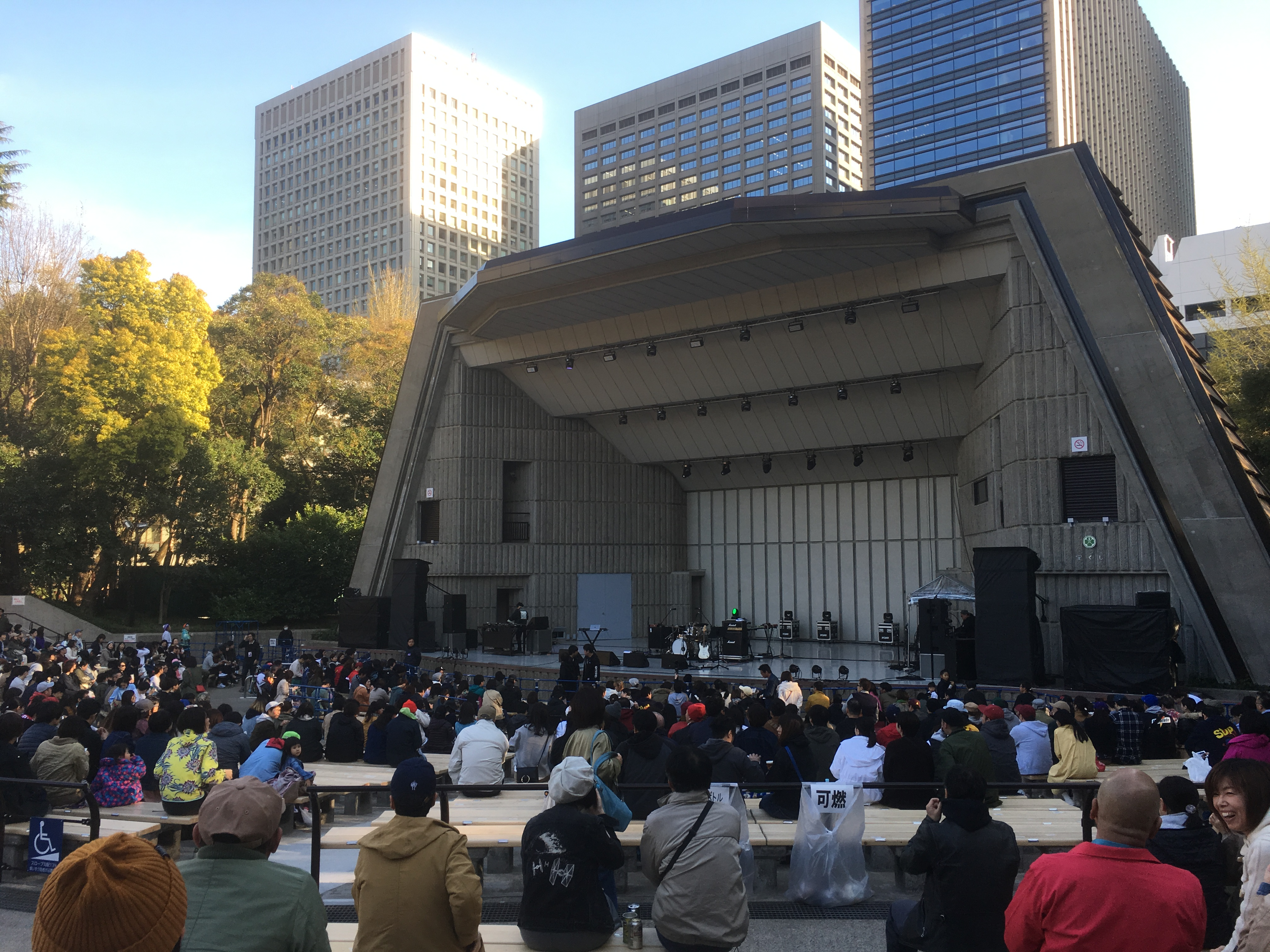
The third generation large hall in 2019

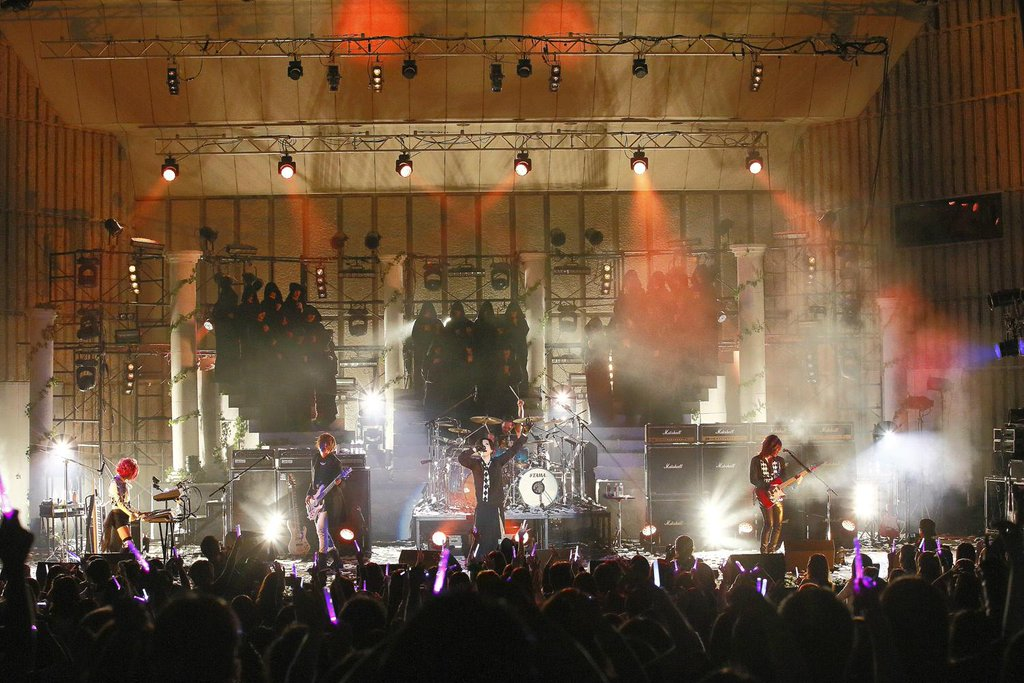
Matenrou Opera performing at the large venue in November 2015
