= Donald S. Sanford =

American screenwriter (1918–2011)

- Born: March 17, 1918
- Died: February 8, 2011 (aged 92); Atlanta, Georgia, US
- Occupation: Screenwriter
- Spouse(s): Joan S Rogers (1951-1969, deceased), Teddi Levison
- Children: 3 step-children through 2nd wife.
- Writing career
- Language: English

Donald S. Sanford (March 17, 1918 – February 8, 2011) was an American television, radio and film screenwriter. Sanford was known for his work on numerous television series, as well as his role as the author of the screenplay for the 1976 World War II film Midway, starring Charlton Heston and Henry Fonda, which became a cult classic.

== Biography ==
Sanford was born March 17, 1918. He served as a chief sonar soundman in the United States Navy from 1942 to 1945 during World War II.

Before World War II, Sanford was a page and tour guide with CBS Radio in Hollywood. He began his career, initially in radio and television, after leaving the U.S. Navy. He supervised the United Nations's disc recording division. He began writing for the radio series Martin Kane, Private Eye, during the early 1950s. Sanford segued to television in the 1950s, working as audio engineer, cameraman, stage manager, and technical director for the DuMont network. His professional credits ultimately included episodes of The Plainclothesman, Gunsmoke, Bonanza, Dr. Kildare, Letter to Loretta, Perry Mason, The Outer Limits, Blue Light, and The Silent Force, among others.

Sanford's film screenplay credits during the 1960s included three feature films set during the World War II era: Submarine X-1, The Thousand Plane Raid, and Mosquito Squadron, all of which were released in 1969. However, Sanford's best-known screenplay was for the 1976 World War II film Midway, which was directed by Jack Smight and starred Charlton Heston and Henry Fonda.

Sanford's last screenwriting credit before his retirement was for the 1979 sci-fi film Ravagers. He later became chief executive officer of Stansbury, Inc., a mining company specializing in vermiculite. He remained active in the screenwriting industry, serving on the Pension and Health Finance Committee for the Writers Guild of American Pension and Health Fund. Sanford was also a full member of the Academy of Motion Picture Arts and Sciences and the Writers Guild of America.

Donald Sanford married Joan Sophia Rogers on July 19, 1951 in Greenwich, CT. Joan was born in England in 1914. They met when she was working for the United Nations in New York, NY. She died in 1969 from cancer in California. They lived in Studio City.

Donald S. Sanford died at a hospital in Atlanta, Georgia, on February 8, 2011, at the age of 92. He was survived by his wife of 35 years, Teddi, and his three stepchildren, Jennifer Levison, Daniel Levison, and Michael Levison.
