= Sly (band) =

Japanese heavy metal band

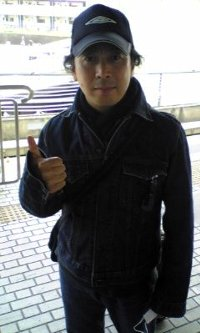
- Vocalist Minoru Niihara, 2008

Background information
- Origin: Japan
- Genres: Heavy metal, speed metal, hard rock
- Years active: 1994 - 1998
- Labels: Victor, East West Japan
- Past members: Minoru Niihara; Shinichiro Ishihara; Koichi Terasawa; Munetaka Higuchi

Sly was a Japanese heavy metal supergroup formed in 1994 by former members of popular Japanese metal bands. The lineup included singer Minoru Niihara drummer Munetaka Higuchi from Loudness, guitarist Shinichiro Ishihara from Earthshaker, and bassist Koichi Terasawa from Blizard. Sly disbanded in 1998. Niihara later formed X.Y.Z.→A, while Higuchi and Niihara rejoined Loudness in 2000. Ishihara participated in the reformation of Earthshaker in 1999, and Terasawa formed Rider Chips in 2000.

== Band members ==
- Minoru Niihara - vocals
- Shinichiro Ishihara - guitars
- Koichi Terasawa - bass
- Munetaka Higuchi - drums

== Discography ==
=== Albums ===
- Sly (1994)
- Loner (EP, 1995)
- Dreams of Dust (1995)
- Key (1996)
- Vulcan Wind (1998)

=== Video albums ===
- Live Kingdom Come (1995)
- Live Dreams of Dust (1996)
