= List of The Outer Limits episodes =

There have been two versions of the anthology television series The Outer Limits. Each has its own episode list.

== Overview ==
Series	Season	Episodes	Originally released			Control Voice
Series	Season	Episodes	First released	Last released	Network	Control Voice
The Outer Limits (1963)	1	32	September 16, 1963	May 4, 1964	ABC	Vic Perrin
The Outer Limits (1963)	2	17	September 19, 1964	January 16, 1965	ABC	Vic Perrin
The Outer Limits (1995)	1	21	March 26, 1995	August 20, 1995	Showtime	Kevin Conway
The Outer Limits (1995)	2	22	January 14, 1996	August 4, 1996	Showtime	Kevin Conway
The Outer Limits (1995)	3	18	January 19, 1997	July 25, 1997	Showtime	Kevin Conway
The Outer Limits (1995)	4	26	January 23, 1998	December 18, 1998	Showtime	Kevin Conway
The Outer Limits (1995)	5	22	January 22, 1999	August 20, 1999	Showtime	Kevin Conway
The Outer Limits (1995)	6	22	January 21, 2000	September 3, 2000	Showtime	Kevin Conway
The Outer Limits (1995)	7	22	March 16, 2001	January 18, 2002	Sci Fi	Kevin Conway

== List ==
- List of The Outer Limits (1963 TV series) episodes
- List of The Outer Limits (1995 TV series) episodes
