= Steffanie Borges =

Japanese-American singer-songwriter (born 1961)

- Also known as: Steffanie
- Born: Steffanie Reiko Borges; August 30, 1961 (age 65); San Francisco, California, U.S.
- Genres: Pop; heavy metal; hard rock
- Occupations: singer, songwriter
- Instrument: Vocals
- Years active: 1977–1996, 2019–present
- Labels: Disco Mate, Warner

Steffanie Reiko Borges (born August 30, 1961), known under her stage name Steffanie (Japanese: ステファニー) is an American-born Japanese glam metal singer, songwriter and musician.

== Biography ==
She was born on 30 August 1961 and is the daughter of Hawaiian jazz singer Jimmy Borges and Japanese dancer Shizuko Yagi. She went to live in Honolulu, Hawaii soon after her birth.

She began her career in Japan as a model for advertising and TV campaigns.

Borges started her singing career recording two debut singles between 1977 and 1978, along with an album in the same year.

During the 1980s, she changed her image and genre from hard rock and melodic heavy metal and producing two new solo albums Hideaway and Pink Noise recorded in Japan, which were released by Warner Japan.

While the musicians that recorded the albums were all Japanese, the band accompanying her in various Japanese television shows were composed by American performers, including her cousins Tony and David Borges and her future husband Randy Juergenson. In this period, she also worked on songs for the anime series Urusei Yatsura and for the movie Urusei Yatsura: Remember My Love.

After a few auditions in 1991, she replaced singer Keiko Terada within the all-female Japanese heavy metal band Show-Ya under her full name, Steffanie Borges. She remained in the band for six years, performing a highly media covered concert in North Korea in June 1991 and recording the single "Flame of the Angels" in 1992 and the album Touch the Sun in 1995 with the group.

She left the band in 1996 and moved to Los Angeles in the United States with her husband Randy Juergenson, who had worked with her during the recording sessions of Touch the Sun.

In 2019 Steffanie's catalog was remastered and re-released. In the same year, Steffanie recorded her rendition of the song "Echo Valley-26809" for the Tin Idols tribute album to the Partridge Family Come On Get Heavy!

== Discography ==
=== Solo albums ===
- Page One (ページ・ワン) (1978)
- Hideaway (1985)
- Pink Noise (1986)

=== Albums with Show-Ya ===
- Touch the Sun (1995)

=== Singles ===
- "Koi no Location" / "I'm a Lucky Girl" (恋のロケーション / アイム・ア・ラッキーガール) (1977)
- "Silhouette" / "Futari no Love Song" (シルエット / ふたりのラヴ・ソング) (1978)
- "Rock the Planet" / "Every Day" (1985)
  - songs for the series Urusei Yatsura, episodes 150–165
- "Born to Be Free" / "Remember My Love" (1985)
  - songs for the movie Urusei Yatsura: Remember My Love
- "Hideaway" / "Survival in the Streets" (1985)
  - song for the Japanese TV drama Triangle Blue
- "Burnin' Up the Night" / "Breakout" (1986)
  - song for the Japanese TV drama Triangle Blue 2
- "School's Out" / "Change of Heart" (1986)
  - Alice Cooper cover
- "Flame of the Angels" / "Don't Say Goodbye" (1992)
  - with Show-Ya
- "Arigatou (Mahalo)" (2021)
  - Ikimono Gakari cover
