= Show-Ya 20th Anniversary The Best =

Compilation album by Show-Ya
- Released: 30 September 2005
- Genre: Rock, hard rock, heavy metal
- Length: 66:39
- Language: Japanese
- Label: EMI Japan

Show-Ya chronology
Show-Ya Golden Best (2002)	Show-Ya 20th Anniversary The Best (2005)	Genuine Diamond (2012)

Show-Ya 20th Anniversary The Best is a CD and DVD collection of songs and videos of the Japanese hard rock band Show-Ya. The Anniversary collection was released in 2005 in Japan, just after the band's reunion.

== Track listing ==
=== CD ===
1. "Genkai Lovers" (限界 Lovers - L.A. Mix) - 3:58
2. "Look at Me!" (2005 version) - 5:40
3. "Metallic Woman" - 6:18
4. "Fire" - 5:00
5. "Mou Friend Wa Iranai" (もうフレンドはいらない) - 4:11
6. "S・T・O・P (But I Can’t…)" - 4:02
7. "Au Revoir" - 5:17
8. "Come On!" (2005 version) - 3:41
9. "Inori" (祈り) - 4:37
10. "Rock Train" - 2:48
11. "Mr. J" - 3:33
12. "Kaigenrei no Machi - Cry for the Freedom" (戒厳令の街 ／Cry for the Freedom) - 4:50
13. "Bad Boys" - 3:56
14. "Watashi Wa Arashi" (私は嵐 - L.A Mix) - 4:02
15. "Kagirinaku Haruka na Jiyuu E (Go Again)" (限りなくはるかな自由へ～Go Again～) - 4:46

=== DVD ===
1. "Shidokenaku Emotion" (しどけなくエモーション)
2. "One Way Heart"
3. "Sono Ato De Koroshitai" (その後で殺したい)
4. "Mizu no Naka no Toubousha" (水の中の逃亡者)
5. "Kodoku no Meiro (Labyrinth)" (孤独の迷路（ラビリンス）)
6. "Aisazu ni Irarenai - Still Be Hangin' On" (愛さずにいられない - Still Be Hangin' On)
7. "Genkai Lovers" (限界 Lovers)
8. "Watashi Wa Arashi" (私は嵐)
9. "Sakebi" (叫び)
10. "Gambling" (ギャンブリング)
