= Voivode (disambiguation) =

Voivode is a Slavic term for a military commander or a governor of a voivodeship.

Voivode, or variants, may also refer to:

- The Voyevoda (opera), an opera by Pyotr Tchaikovsky
- Voivod (band), a Canadian metal band
- Voivod (album), an album by Voivod
- R-36M2 "Voyevoda", a modification of the Russian missile R-36
- The Voyevoda (symphonic ballad), a composition by Pyotr Ilyich Tchaikovsky
- Wojewoda (film), a 1912 Polish silent film
- Voivoda, Greece (disambiguation), several Greek places

== People with the surname ==
- Alexey Voyevoda (born 1980), Russian bobsledder and armwrestler
- Dávid Vojvoda (born 1990), Hungarian basketball player
- Juan Pablo Vojvoda (born 1975), Argentine football manager
- Malesija Vojvoda (born 1970), Montenegrin football player and manager
- Mërgim Vojvoda (born 1995), Kosovo Albanian footballer
- Michael Phillip Wojewoda, Canadian record producer and musician
