= Show-Ya Golden Best =

Compilation album by Show-Ya
- Released: 19 June 2002
- Genre: Rock, hard rock, heavy metal
- Length: 77:08
- Language: Japanese
- Label: EMI Japan

Show-Ya chronology
| This My Way (1998) | Show-Ya Golden Best (2002) | Show-Ya 20th Anniversary The Best (2005) |

Show-Ya Golden Best is a compilation of songs and of the Japanese hard rock group Show-Ya. The collection was released in 2002 in Japan.

== Track listing ==
1. "Watashi Wa Arashi" (私は嵐) – 4:04
2. "Genkai Lovers" (限界 Lovers) – 4:00
3. "Sakebi" (叫び) – 4:25
4. "Ubaitore" (奪いとれ) – 4:00
5. "Aisazu ni Irarenai – Still Be Hangin' On" (愛さずにいられない – Still Be Hangin' On) – 4:57
6. "One Way Heart" – 4:17
7. "Touch Me" – 3:10
8. "Shidokenaku Emotion" (しどけなくエモーション) – 4:06
9. "Suteki ni Dancing (Coke Is It)" (素敵にダンシング – Coke Is It!) – 5:38
10. "Mizu no Naka no Toubousha" (水の中の逃亡者) – 3:58
11. "Love Sick" – 3:45
12. "Yoru Ga Kuru Made Nemuretai" (夜が来るまで眠りたい) – 4:30
13. "Fermata" (フェルマータ) – 4:09
14. "Kodoku no Meiro (Labyrinth)" (孤独の迷路（ラビリンス）) – 4:50
15. "Ai no Frustration" (愛の Frustration) – 4:25
16. "Uso Da To Itte Yo, Moon Light" (嘘だと言ってよ Moon Light) – 4:44
17. "Get Down" – 3:58
18. "Sono Ato de Koroshitai" (その後で殺したい) – 4:12
