= Voivoda, Greece =

Voivoida (Greek: Βοϊβόδα, Voïvóda), from the Slavic title voivode - may refer to:

- Vasiliki, Lefkada, a village on the island of Lefkada
- Vasiliki, Trikala, municipal unit in Thessaly

== See also ==
- Titani, Greece - formerly Voivonta (Greek: Βοϊβοντά, Voïvontá), from the same Slavic title voivode
