= Show-Ya =

Japanese heavy metal band

- Origin: Japan
- Genres: Heavy metal, glam metal, hard rock
- Years active: 1981–1998, 2005–present
- Labels: Toshiba EMI, Creedence, Balancing Rock
- Members: Keiko Terada; Miki Nakamura; Miki Igarashi; Satomi Senba; Miki Tsunoda
- Past members: Mitsuko Numata; Steffanie Borges; Yoshino
- Website: show-ya.jp

Show-Ya (Japanese: ショーヤ, Hepburn: Shōya) is a Japanese all-female heavy metal band formed in 1981. The group disbanded in 1998 but reformed with the original line-up in 2005 for the 20th anniversary of their first release. Their music is deeply rooted in classic rock and they have covered songs by bands and artists such as The Beatles, The Doors, the Yardbirds, Led Zeppelin, Deep Purple, and AC/DC in their albums and live shows. Their music evolved from the pop rock genre of their first offerings to the heavy metal genre of their most successful albums, Outerlimits (1989) and Hard Way (1990). Show-Ya annually organizes and produces the all-female rock festival Naon no Yaon, which they founded in 1987.

== History ==
=== 1981–1998: Formation, success, and disbandment ===
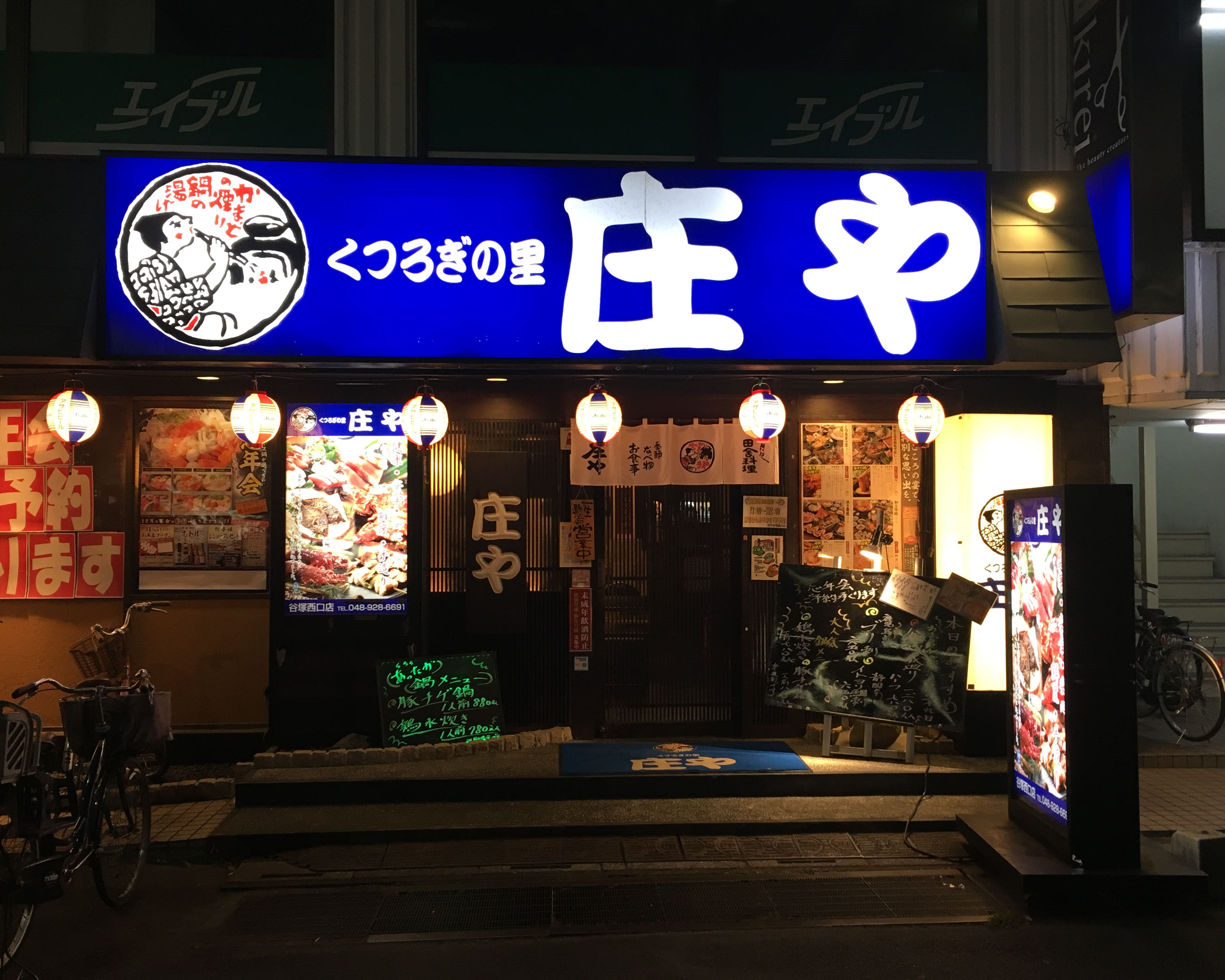
A Shōya izakaya, like the one the band derived their name from

Show-Ya was formed in 1981 by Keiko Terada and Miki Nakamura, who had been playing together for a year in order to enter the East West Grand Prix musical contest organized and sponsored by Yamaha. Because they were unable to win previous contests they had entered, they decided to change their name from Medusa (メデューサ). The members chose Shōya (庄や) after the izakaya chain they held the meeting at in Chiba Prefecture, but decided to write the name in English. Wanting to captivate the audience as they believed their strength was in their live performances, "we decided to create a live show for you! So we named it SHOW YOU=SHOW YA!" The new band won the contest for best female group, which resulted in a record contract with Toshiba EMI. In 1983, Miki Igarashi replaced the original guitarist Mitsuko Numata and the line-up was completed by drummer Miki Tsunoda and bassist Satomi Senba. Nakamura, Igarashi and Tsunoda adopted the stage names of “Captain”, “Sun-Go” and “Mittan” to avoid confusion with the first name Miki, which they have in common. During this period, they wrote material for their debut studio album Masquerade Show, which was recorded in Japan and mixed at Abbey Road Studios in London. The album was promoted by The Coca-Cola Company, which used their debut single "Suteki Ni Dancing (Coke Is It)" for a TV and radio commercial campaign. While in London, the band had the opportunity to play in front of an audience at Dingwalls and at the legendary rock club The Marquee. After the successful release of their debut studio album, the band returned to Abbey Road Studios to mix their second album Queendom the following year.

The interest of the Japanese press and the ever-increasing presence of the band on TV shows led soon to a more professional and organized approach to the music business. With their fourth studio album Trade Last, they ceded musical direction to expert Yasushi Akimoto, famous for being the man behind the success of the Japanese idol all-female band Onyanko Club. The Japanese idol phenomenon affected the band only marginally, but Akimoto's management gave them the chance to play in front of larger audiences in their “Date Line” national tour. Their performance at Nakano Sun Plaza in Tokyo was recorded for their first VHS.

In 1987, the band was approached by producer Andy Johns, who had worked with artists such as Led Zeppelin, Rolling Stones and Van Halen. He was responsible for the mixing of the albums Immigration and Glamour in Los Angeles, California. The explosion of the glam metal phenomenon in California influenced both the style and the sound of the band's following albums. Songs taken from the “Immigration Tour” and the “Tour of the Immigrant” were recorded for the band's first live album, Turn Over.

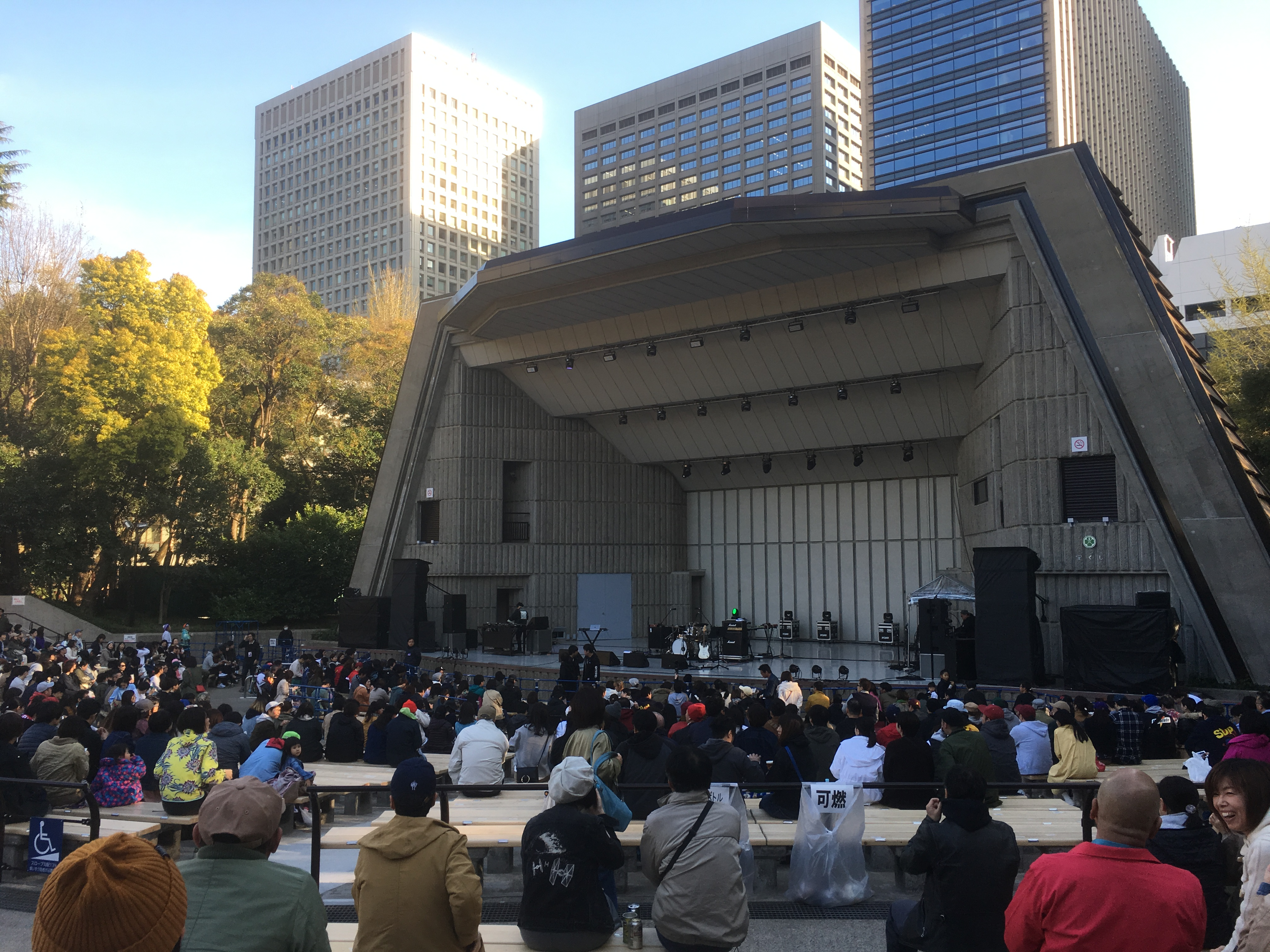
Show-Ya annually organize the Naon no Yaon music festival at Hibiya Open-Air Concert Hall (pictured).

In September 1987, Show-Ya organized, produced and presented the first Naon no Yaon music festival, featuring strictly female musicians and all-female bands. The festival was then held annually at the same venue, until 1991.

On 27 April 1988, Show-Ya performed their first live show on American soil, at the Roxy Theatre in West Hollywood. The name of Show-Ya was soon associated by the specialized press with other great female acts of the time, such as Vixen and Lita Ford.

In 1989 they recorded Outerlimits, which reached position No.3 in the Japanese chart becoming the band's best selling album, selling over 200,000 copies in the first two months and eventually going double Platinum with sales exceeding 600,000 copies today. The hit single "Genkai Lovers" was used for a Shell campaign and became their best known song. Their live shows went sold out in large theatres all over Japan, filling up even the prestigious Budokan in Tokyo. An international tour touched cities like London, Moscow, Los Angeles and Mexico City.

At the beginning of 1990, the band's eighth studio album Hard Way was produced and recorded in Los Angeles by Beau Hill (Alice Cooper, Winger, Europe, Ratt). The band was featured on the cover of the Los Angeles Times in 1990, where they were considered the female version of popular Japanese metal bands Vow Wow and Loudness. They had reached the peak of their popularity in their home country but, despite many promotional attempts by their label and management, the band failed to achieve a significant commercial success in the USA.

In February 1991, lead singer Keiko Terada left the group, considering the musical direction the band was taking too mainstream orientated. Wishing to explore new and more varied musical influences, she started a solo career. After many auditions, the band recruited Japanese-American singer Steffanie Borges. She sings and speaks in fluent English and the band hoped that this could help their attempt to break in the US market. In June of the same year, the North Korean government invited the band to perform at the Mansudae Art Theatre in Pyongyang and the historic two-day concerts were heavily covered by the Japanese media. On 4 January 1992, the band performed theme music at the wrestling event Super Warriors in Tokyo Dome, for a match between Sting and The Great Muta and The Steiner Brothers.

After years of hard work and financial support, at the end of 1992, Master Works Co. solved its management contract with Show-Ya, preferring to continue managing only Keiko Terada. At the same time, the band lost their long engagement with EMI Japan, just after the release of their first single with Steffanie Borges, "Flame of the Angels". The band spent some time in Los Angeles, recording and playing shows constantly, and in 1995 they released their only album with Borges, Touch the Sun on the Creedence label. At the end of the tour in 1996, Borges left and was replaced by singer Yoshino. Show-Ya released the EP This My Way in 1998 and, by the end of the year, the band officially disbanded. Each member parted and went their separated ways, pursuing individual careers and playing with various artists. Igarashi was reunited briefly with Terada in the All Japan's Women Pro Band, which also included members of Princess Princess.

=== 2005–present: Reunion ===
Seven years after disbanding, Show-Ya officially reunited with Keiko Terada in 2005. The singer said she had previously reached out to her former bandmates about reuniting following the Great Hanshin earthquake in 1995. Although they turned her down, the musicians all stayed in touch. Show-Ya held a concert celebrating the 20th anniversary of their debut at NHK Hall in Tokyo on October 23. The concerts were recorded and released on DVD. For the occasion, EMI Japan reprinted all the band's back catalogue in remastered CD editions and released an extensive compilation with a few remixed tracks. The Show-Ya Live 2006 DVD was released in 2007. In 2008, they held the first Naon no Yaon festival in 17 years. It lasted 5 hours, featured 61 people in total, and was attended by an audience of 3,000.

Show-Ya released Genuine Diamond, their tenth studio album and first in 17 years, in March 2012. Naon no Yaon was fully revived in 2013 in conjunction with the 90th anniversary of Hibiya Open-Air Concert Hall, and has been held annually since. As part of the band's 30th anniversary celebrations in 2015, the album Progress was released in September and a club tour was held in October. Their 11th studio album, Aurora, followed two years later in 2017.

In 2021, the album Showdown was released as Show-Ya's first worldwide release. It was written entirely in English and features German singer Dorothee Pesch. The band also held a concert at Line Cube Shibuya on August 29 to celebrate the 35th anniversary of their debut.

== Members ==
- Keiko Terada – lead vocals, tambourine (1981–1991, 2005–present)
- Miki "Sun-go" Igarashi – guitar, backing vocals (1984–1998, 2005–present)
- Miki "Captain" Nakamura – keyboards, backing vocals (1981–1998, 2005–present)
- Satomi Senba – bass, backing vocals (1982–1998, 2005–present)
- Miki "Mittan" Tsunoda – drums, backing vocals (1982–1998, 2005–present)

=== Former members ===
- Mitsuko Numata – guitar (1981–1984)
- Steffanie Borges – vocals (1991–1996)
- Yoshino – vocals (1996–1998)

== Discography ==
=== Studio albums ===
- Masquerade Show (1985)
- Queendom (1986)
- Ways (1986)
- Trade Last (1987)
- Immigration (1987)
- Glamour (1988)
- Outerlimits (1989)
- Hard Way (1990)
- Touch the Sun (1995)
- Genuine Diamond (2012)
- Progress (2015)
- Aurora (2017)
- Showdown (2021)

=== EPs ===
- L.A. Live (1989)
- This My Way (1998)

=== Cover albums ===
- Glamorous Show (2014)
- Glamorous Show II (2015)
- Mugen (無限; 2025)

=== Live albums ===
- Turn Over (1988)
- Hard Way Tour 1991 (1991)

=== Soundtracks ===
- Burai Prototype (1989)

=== Compilation albums ===
- New Best Now (1987)
- New Best Now 70 (1988)
- White (1988)
- Show-Ya Greatest 1985–1990 (1991)
- Complete Best: Back Fire (1992)
- Show-Ya Twin Best (1996)
- Show-Ya Golden Best (2002)
- Show-Ya 20th Anniversary The Best (2005)

=== Singles ===
- "Suteki ni Dancing (Coke Is It)" / "Au Revoir (Last Scene)" (1985/08/31)
- "Shidokenaku Emotion" / "You Can Dance" (1986/02/01)
- "One Way Heart" / "Love Sick" (1986/08/22)
- "Sono Ato de Koroshitai" / "Yoru ga Kuru Made Nemuretai" (1987/01/22)
- "Mizu no Naka no Toubousha" / "Fermata" (1987/05/25)
  Theme for the TV Asahi series Metropolis 25
- "Kodoku no Meiro (Labyrinth)" / "Uso da to Itte yo, Moon Light" (1987/10/26)
- "Aisazu ni Irarenai - Still Be Hangin' On" / "Get Down" (1988/06/25)
  Also available with the English version of "Still Be Hangin' On" as B-side
- "3 Dome no Christmas" / "Go" (1988)
- "Genkai Lovers" / "What Do You Say?" (1989/02/01)
  Used for a Shell commercial
- "Watashi wa Arashi" / "Ai no Frustration" (1989/06/07)
- "Sakebi" / "Ubaitore" (1990/03/07)
- "Gambling" / "Naze" (1990/09/05)
- "Flame of the Angels" / "Don't Say Goodbye" (1992/01/29)
- "V.S. Myself" (2013/07/24)

==== Others ====
- " Tribute to Seikima-II -Akuma to no Keiyakusho-" covering the song "Rouningyou no Yakata"(2010/09/15)

== Videography ==
- Date Line (1987)
- Rollin World (1989)
- 1990 Budokan - Reach for the World (1990)
- Distance on Their Way (1991)
- Hard Way Tour 1991 (1991)
- 20th Anniversary Live (2005)
- Show-Ya Live 2006 (2007)
- Hardest Rock (2013)
