= Earthshaker (band) =

Japanese heavy metal band

- Origin: Osaka, Japan
- Genres: Heavy metal; hard rock
- Years active: 1978–1994, 1999–present
- Labels: Nexus/King; Toshiba EMI; Warner; Wide Tread; Zetima; Danger Crue
- Members: Shinichiro "Shara" Ishihara; Yoshihiro Kudo; Masafumi "Marcy" Nishida; Takayuki Kai; Toshio "Toshi" Egawa
- Past members: Yoshinobu Watanabe; Minoru Niihara
- Website: Earthshaker.jp

Earthshaker (Japanese: アースシェイカー, Hepburn: Āsusheikā) is a Japanese heavy metal band that was formed in 1978 in Osaka. One of the first Japanese metal bands, they steered toward a poppier sound on later albums and dropped from worldwide view, preferring to record and tour in their home country. After a successful run, they broke up in 1994, but returned five years later and remain active.

The original incarnation of the band included Minoru Niihara (of Loudness fame) as singer and bassist.

== Members ==
=== Current members ===
- Shinichiro "Shara" Ishihara (石原愼一郎) – guitar (1978–1994, 1999–present)
- Yoshihiro Kudo (工藤義弘) – drums (1979–1994, 1999–present)
- Masafumi "Marcy" Nishida (西田昌史) – vocals (1980–1994, 1999–present)
- Takayuki Kai (甲斐貴之) – bass (1980–1994, 1999–present)
- Toshio "Toshi" Egawa (永川敏郎) – keyboards (1986–1994, 2017–present)

=== Former members ===
- Yoshinobu Watanabe (渡辺芳信) – drums (1978–1979)
- Minoru Niihara (二井原実) – vocals and bass (1978–1980)

== Discography ==
=== Studio albums ===
- 1983 - Earthshaker
- 1984 - Fugitive
- 1984 - Midnight Flight
- 1985 - Passion
- 1986 - Overrun
- 1987 - Aftershock
- 1988 - Smash
- 1989 - Treachery
- 1990 - Pretty Good!
- 1992 - Earthshaker
- 1993 - Real
- 1993 - Yesterday & Tomorrow
- 2001 - Birthday
- 2003 - Soko-Ni Aru Shi
- 2004 - Faith
- 2007 - Aim
- 2008 - Quarter
- 2009 - The Course of Life
- 2010 - Back to Nexus
- 2011 - Pray for the Earth
- 2013 - The Earthshaker
- 2015 - Bird
- 2018 - The Story Goes On
- 2023 - 40

=== Singles ===
- 1983 - "Blondie Girl"
- 1984 - "T-O-K-Y-O"
- 1984 - "Exciting Mini"
- 1985 - "ありがとう君に"
- 1985 - "Exciting Mini 2"
- 1987 - "Shaker's Shakies"

=== Live albums ===
- 1986 - Live in Budokan
- 1989 - Earthshaker Live Encore!
- 1994 - Remains - Earthshaker Last Live
- 2000 - More - Earthshaker in Vancouver
- 2014 - 30th Anniversary Special Live

=== Compilation albums ===
- 1984 - Hell Comes To Your House
- 1987 - The Best of Earthshaker
- 1988 - The Ballads of Earthshaker
- 1995 - The Very Best of Earthshaker
- 2002 - Golden Best
- 2002 - The Best of Nexus Years
- 2005 - 1987-1992 The Best

=== Video/DVDs ===
- 1984 - Midnight Flight
- 1985 - Passion the Movie
- 1987 - After Shock
- 1990 - So Good
