= Eastworld =

Japanese record label

- Parent company: Universal Music Japan (2012–present) EMI Music Japan (2007–2012) Toshiba-EMI (1978–2007)
- Founded: 1978; 48 years ago
- Distributors: Universal (2012–present); EMI (1978–2012)
- Genre: Various
- Country of origin: Japan
- Location: Tokyo, Japan

Eastworld (イーストワールド, Iisutowārudo) is a Japanese record label owned by Universal Music Japan. It was originally founded in 1978 under Toshiba-EMI. In 2012, Eastworld's parent company, EMI Music Japan, was acquired by Universal Music Japan following the acquisition of EMI by Universal Music Group. Following a company restructure in April 2013, Universal Japan placed Eastworld under USM Japan, a record label that handles archives of Universal Japan-owned labels.

== Former artists ==
- Namie Amuro
- Boøwy
- Complex
- George Cables
- Jennifer Connelly
- Minako Honda
- Toshiyuki Honda
- Tomoyasu Hotei
- Koji Kikkawa
- Original Love
- Patty (singer)
- Marvin Peterson
- RC Succession
- Sadistic Mika Band
- Sandii
- Yukihiro Takahashi
- Hikaru Utada
- The Willard

== See also ==
- EMI Music Japan
