= Keiko Terada =

Japanese rock singer (born 1963)

- Born: Keiko Terada; 27 July 1963 (age 63); Funabashi, Japan
- Genres: Rock, hard rock, heavy metal
- Occupations: Musician, songwriter, producer, radio host
- Instruments: Vocals, guitar, tambourine
- Years active: 1981–present
- Label: EMI Japan
- Website: www.masterworks.co.jp/KeikoTerada/

Keiko Terada (寺田恵子, Terada Keiko; born 27 July 1963) is a Japanese rock singer. She was co-founder and lead singer of the successful Japanese female hard rock and heavy metal band Show-Ya from 1982 to 1991, before going solo. On her solo albums she expanded from hard rock and heavy metal to blues, pop and soul.

Terada's trademark for many years was a fake rose tattoo she wore above her right breast. She was inspired by Bette Midler's film The Rose, in which Midler played a Janis Joplin-like character.

She maintained over the years a relevant presence in both Japanese TV and Radio, both alone and as member of other bands. She is now member of the reformed Show-Ya and of the special group Nishidera Minoru.

== Biography ==
Keiko Terada cited Carmen Maki as the reason she became interested in rock music. She started singing professionally in 1981 and co-founded the band Show-Ya in 1982, with keyboard player Miki Nakamura. The band enjoyed popularity in the late 80s in Japan and attempted to break into the international market without success. In 1987, Show-Ya and Terada organized and held the first Naon no Yaon music festival, which exclusively features female musicians. Each member of the band recommends acts and helps decide the performers, but Terada is the main force behind the festival. In 1988, together with Masafumi "Marcy" Nishida, lead singer of Japanese heavy metal band Earthshaker, she released songs for the anime Sonic Soldier Borgman under the moniker HIPS. Terada left Show-Ya in 1991 to pursue a solo career.

The song "Paradise Wind", taken from her first album Body & Soul, was chosen as the official theme for the Japanese TV NHK broadcasting of the Barcelona Olympic Games. Other songs from her solo albums have been used as TV themes or for radio and TV commercials.

In 1994 Terada joined the cast of the Classic Rock Jam show and she has performed every year, visiting many Japanese cities until 2009. In 1995 she was on stage for the 'Rock on Kobe' charity show after the Great Hanshin earthquake. The following year Terada worked with former Red Warriors' guitarist Shake on his project Psychodelicious and released the song "Thank You, Love", final theme for the anime You're Under Arrest!.

In 1998 she sang in the tribute album Cozy Powell Forever album produced by Loudness drummer Munetaka Higuchi and worked again with Higuchi for his SuperRock Summit project in 1999. Always in 1998, Terada formed with her former bandmate in Show-Ya Miki 'Sun-Go' Igarashi (guitars), with former Princess Princess members Atsuko Watanabe (bass) and Kyoko Tomita (drums) and with Rie Chikaraishi (keyboards) the 'All Japan Women's Pro Band', which performed live and for TV shows for a couple of years. The same year she started a radio broadcast called 'Spirit of Rock' and is still a regular radio host for NHK.

In 2002 she sang with the band Rider Chips the theme song for the TV show Kamen Rider Ryuki. She also sang the theme song for the anime Area 88 in 2004. Terada continued to perform on her own until 2005, when Show-Ya reformed with the original line-up and has been lead singer of the band ever since, releasing a new studio album in 2012.

In 2008 Terada formed a parallel band called Nishidera Minoru, with Loudness singer Minoru Niihara and Masafumi Nishida. This new band released an album and organized the Hard na Yaon 2009 festival in Japan.

== Discography ==
=== Albums ===
- Body & Soul (8 May 1992)
- Invisible (24 March 1993)
- Out of Bounds (21 April 1994)
- Warui Yume (悪い夢) (23 November 1994)
- End of the World (21 February 1996)
- Wonderground (26 March 2003)
- Piece of My Heart (19 October 2016)

=== Singles ===
- "Paradise Wind" (21 July 1992)
- "Dream Again" (21 January 1993)
- "Open Your Heart" (21 May 1993)
- "Tengoku no Deguchi" (天国の出口) (21 April 1994)
- "Sora e" (空へ) (23 November 1994)
- "Dead or Alive" (26 September 1997)

=== Collaborations ===
- Hips: "Yoru o Buttobase" (夜をぶっとばせ) / "Tender" (30 November 1988)
- Cozy Powell Forever (19 September 1998)
- SuperRock Summit – Stairway to Heaven (17 March 1999)
- SuperRock Summit – Rainbow Eyes (30 June 1999)
- Rider Chips featuring Keiko Terada: "Hateshinai Honō no Naka E" (果てしない炎の中へ) (18 June 2002)
- エリア88 (Area 88): "Mission (Fuga) (by Angels)" / "Senjō no Dance" (戦場のダンス) – Dance in the Battlefield (25 February 2004)

=== Videos ===
- Virgin Flight (12/02/1992)

=== Anime Song ===
- "Thank You Love" from the Animation Sound Track: You're Under Arrest (25 November 1996)
