= Animetal USA (album) =

Studio album by Animetal USA
- Released: October 12, 2011
- Recorded: 2011
- Genre: Heavy metal; anison
- Length: 42:27
- Label: SME Records
- Producer: Marty Friedman

Animetal USA chronology
Animetal USA (2011)	Animetal USA W (2012)

Animetal USA (アニメタルUSA, Animetaru Yū Esu Ē) is the debut album by Japan-based American heavy metal band Animetal USA, formed as a tribute to Eizo Sakamoto's band Animetal. Released through SME Records on October 12, 2011, the album consists of a series of English language covers of popular anime theme songs. It received an American release through Century Media Records on June 26, 2012, with a different track arrangement and two tracks replaced with two from their follow-up album Animetal USA W, plus two tracks from their single "Give Lee Give Lee Rock Lee".

The album peaked at No. 18 on Oricon's weekly albums chart, remaining there for nine weeks.

== Track listing ==
All tracks are arranged by Chris Impellitteri and Marty Friedman.

CD
No.	Title	Anime & original artist	Length
1.	"Uchū Senkan Yamato" ((宇宙戦艦ヤマト))	Space Battleship Yamato, song by Isao Sasaki	2:51
2.	"Gatchaman no Uta" ((ガッチャマンの歌, "Song of Gatchaman"))	Science Ninja Team Gatchaman, song by Masato Shimon and the Otowa Yurikago Kai	3:38
3.	"Mazinger Medley (マジンガー・メドレー, "Majingā Medorē"): "Mazinger Z" (マジンガーZ, Majingā Zetto); "Ore wa Great Mazinger" (おれはグレートマジンガー, Ore wa Gurēto Majingā, "I Am Great Mazinger")"	Mazinger Z and Great Mazinger, songs by Ichirou Mizuki	4:23
4.	"Makafushigi Adventure!" (Makafushigi Adobenchā! (魔訶不思議アドベンチャー!, "A Mystical Adventure!"))	Dragon Ball, song by Hiroki Takahashi	3:42
5.	"Zankoku na Tenshi no Tēze (Note: Incorporates Rush's "2112")" ((残酷な天使のテーゼ, "A Cruel Angel's Thesis"))	Neon Genesis Evangelion, song by Yoko Takahashi	4:42
6.	"Ai o Torimodose!! (Note: Incorporates Iron Maiden's "The Trooper")" ((愛をとりもどせ!!, "Take Back the Love!!"))	Fist of the North Star, song by Crystal King	3:51
7.	"Ganbare Dokaben (Note: Incorporates Black Sabbath's "Into the Void")" ((がんばれドカベン, "Let's Go Dokaben"))	Dokaben, song by Koorogi '73	3:05
8.	"Pegasus Fantasy (Note: Incorporates Slayer's "Raining Blood")" ("Pegasasu Fantajī" (ペガサス幻想))	Saint Seiya, song by Make-Up	4:40
9.	"Ike Tiger Mask" ("Ike Taigā Masuku" (行けタイガーマスク, "Go Tiger Mask"))	Tiger Mask, song by Hiroshi Arai and the School Mates	4:14
10.	"Kinnikuman Go Fight!" ((キン肉マン GO FIGHT!))	Kinnikuman, song by Akira Kushida	3:16
11.	"Yuke Yuke Hyūma (Note: Incorporates Accept's "Fast as a Shark")" ((ゆけゆけ飛雄馬, "Go Go Hyūma"))	Star of the Giants, song by Ensemble Bokka	4:01
Total length:			42:27

American iTunes release
No.	Title	Anime & original artist	Length
1.	"Touch"	Touch, song by Yoshimi Iwasaki	4:40
2.	"Mazinger Medley"		4:23
3.	"Pegasus Fantasy"		4:39
4.	"Uchuusenkan Yamato"		2:55
5.	"JAM Project Medley: "Vanguard"; "Maxon"; "Skill""	Cardfight!! Vanguard, Super Robot Wars Original Generation: The Inspector, 2nd Super Robot Wars Alpha; songs by JAM Project	5:47
6.	"Makafushigi Adventure!"		3:42
7.	"Zankokuna Tenshi no Thesis"		4:42
8.	"Ganbare Dokaben"		3:06
9.	"Ike Tigermask"		4:13
10.	"Yukeyuke Hyuma"		4:02
11.	"Aiwo Torimodose!!"		3:44
12.	"Give Lee Give Lee Rock Lee" (English version)	Rock Lee & His Ninja Pals, song by Animetal USA × Hironobu Kageyama	4:25
13.	"Give Lee Give Lee Rock Lee" (Animetal USA x Hironobu Kageyama)		4:17
Total length:			54:35

== Personnel ==
- Michael Vescera (a.k.a. "Metal Rider") - lead vocals
- Chris Impellitteri (a.k.a. "Speed King") - guitar
- Rudy Sarzo (a.k.a. "Storm Bringer") - bass
- Scott Travis (a.k.a. "Tank") - drums

== Charts ==
Chart (2011)	Peak position
Japanese Albums (Oricon)	18
