= Animetal USA W =

Studio album by Animetal USA
- Released: June 6, 2012
- Recorded: 2012
- Genre: Heavy metal; anison
- Length: 49:02
- Language: English; Japanese
- Label: SME Records
- Producer: Greg Reely; Animetal USA

Animetal USA chronology
Animetal USA (2011)	Animetal USA W (2012)

Singles from Animetal USA W
- 1. "Give Lee Give Lee Rock Lee" Released: April 25, 2012

Animetal USA W (アニメタルUSA W, Animetaru Yū Esu Ē Daburu) is the second studio album by Japan-based American heavy metal band Animetal USA, formed as a tribute to Eizo Sakamoto's band Animetal. Released through SME Records on June 6, 2012, the album consists of a series of English language covers of popular anime theme songs. Unlike the previous album, Animetal USA sought out the input from their Japanese and American fans for suggestions on tracks to include on their second album and it also includes an original track. "Give Lee Give Lee Rock Lee" is a collaboration with Hironobu Kageyama of LAZY and JAM Project. A limited edition release includes a bonus DVD

The album peaked at No. 17 on Oricon's weekly albums chart, remaining there for eight weeks.

== Track listing ==
All tracks are arranged by Chris Impellitteri and Marty Friedman.

CD
No.	Title	Anime/tokusatsu & original artist	Length
1.	"Touch" (Tatchi (タッチ))	Touch, song by Yoshimi Iwasaki	4:40
2.	"Cat's Eye"	Cat's Eye, song by Anri	3:35
3.	"Hero Medley (ヒーローメドレー, Hīrō Medorē): "Devilman no Uta" (デビルマンのうた, Debiruman no Uta; "Song of Devilman"); "Let's Go Rider Kick" (レッツゴーライダーキック, Rettsu Gō Raidā Kikku); "Tatakae! Kamen Rider V3" (戦え！仮面ライダーV3, Tatakae! Kamen Raidā Bui Surī; "Fight! Kamen Rider V3"); "Himitsu Sentai Gorenger" (秘密戦隊ゴレンジャー, Himitsu Sentai Gorenjā); "Ultraseven no Uta" (ウルトラセブンの歌, Urutorasebun no Uta; "Song of Ultraseven")"	Devilman, song by Ichirou Mizuki; Kamen Rider, song by Hiroshi Fujioka & Kōichi Fuji; Kamen Rider V3, song by Hiroshi Miyauchi & The Swingers; Himitsu Sentai Gorenger, song by Isao Sasaki & Koorogi '73; Ultraseven, song by the Misuzu Children's Choir & The Echoes	5:26
4.	"Dragon Ball Medley (ドラゴンボール・メドレー, Doragon Bōru Zetto Medorē): "Cha-La Head-Cha-La"; "We Gotta Power""	Dragon Ball Z, songs by Hironobu Kageyama	3:58
5.	"The Galaxy Express 999" (Ginga Tetsudō Surī Nain (銀河鉄道999))	Galaxy Express 999 film, song by Godiego	2:55
6.	"We Are!" (ウィーアー! (Wī Ā!))	One Piece, song by Hiroshi Kitadani	4:17
7.	"Yuzurenai Negai (Note: Incorporates Loudness' "Crazy Night")" ((ゆずれない願い; "Unyielding Wish"))	Magic Knight Rayearth, song by Naomi Tamura	4:43
8.	"Shōjo Anime Medley (女子アニメドレー, Shōjo Anime Medorē): "Cutie Honey" (キューティーハニー, Kyūtī Hanī); "Attack No. 1 no Theme" (アタックNO.1のテーマ, Atakku Nanbā Wan no Tēma); "Moonlight Densetsu" (ムーンライト伝説, Mūnraito Densetsu; "Moonlight Legend"); "Himitsu no Akko-chan" (ひみつのアッコちゃん; "Secrets of Akko-chan"); "Mahōtsukai Sally" (魔法使いサリー, Mahōtsukai Sarī)"	Cutie Honey, song by Yoko Maekawa; Attack No. 1, song by Kumiko Ōsugi; Sailor Moon, song by DALI; Himitsu no Akko-chan, song by Kyoko Okada & Mitsuko Horie; Sally the Witch, song by The Three Graces & Hiroko Asakawa	4:21
9.	"Ai Oboete Imasu ka" ((愛・おぼえていますか; "Do You Remember Love?"))	Macross: Do You Remember Love?, song by Mari Iijima	4:46
10.	"JAM Project Medley (JAM Projectメドレー, Jamu Purojekuto Medorē): "Vanguard"; "Maxon"; "Skill""	Cardfight!! Vanguard, Super Robot Wars Original Generation: The Inspector, 2nd Super Robot Wars Alpha; songs by JAM Project	5:46
11.	"Give Lee Give Lee Rock Lee" (extended version)	Rock Lee & His Ninja Pals, song by Animetal USA × Hironobu Kageyama	4:25
Total length:			49:02

Limited Edition DVD
No.	Title	Anime & original artist	Length
1.	"Uchū Senkan Yamato (宇宙戦艦ヤマト)" (Music Video)	Space Battleship Yamato, song by Isao Sasaki
2.	"Zankoku na Tenshi no Tēze (Note: Incorporates Rush's "2112") (残酷な天使のテーゼ; "A Cruel Angel's Thesis")" (Music Video)	Neon Genesis Evangelion, song by Yoko Takahashi
3.	"Animetal USA Release Commemorative Event "World Debut Match ~ 60 Minutes 1 Match" Digest Video (アニメタルUSA発売記念イベント「世界デビュー・マッチ~60分1本勝負」ダイジェスト映像, Animetaru USA Hatsubai Kinen Ibento `Sekai Debyū Matchi ~ 60-bu 1-pon Shōbu' Daijesuto Eizō)"
4.	"Loud Park 11 Digest Video (Loud Park 11 ダイジェスト映像, Raudo Pāku 11 Daijesuto Eizō)"

== Personnel ==
- Michael Vescera (a.k.a. "Metal Rider") – lead vocals
- Chris Impellitteri (a.k.a. "Speed King") – guitar
- Rudy Sarzo (a.k.a. "Storm Bringer") – bass
- Jon Dette (a.k.a. "Tank") – drums

with

- Hironobu Kageyama – vocals (11)

== Charts ==
Chart (2012)	Peak position
Japanese Albums (Oricon)	17
