= Disney Super Guitar =

American rock band

- Also known as: Super Guitar Disney
- Origin: United States
- Genre: Instrumental rock
- Years active: 2018–present
- Label: Walt Disney Records
- Members: Michael Vescera; John Bruno; Chris Vescera; BJ Zampa

Disney Super Guitar (also known as Super Guitar Disney in Japan) is an American rock band who specialized in instrumental covers of theme songs from Disney films.

== Band personnel ==
- Keyboards = Michael Vescera (Obsession, ex-Yngwie Malmsteen, ex-Loudness, etc..)
- Bass = Chris Vescera (Michael Vescera's brother)
- Rhythm guitar = John Bruno (Obsession, Michael Vescera, and X Factor X)
- Drums = BJ Zampa (House of Lords, ex-Yngwie Malmsteen, ex-Obsession, and Dokken)

== Disney Super Guitar album ==
The eponymous album was recorded in 2018 by much of the same team that created D-Metal Stars' Metal Disney, with Michael Vescera (keyboards, arrangement, production), John Bruno (rhythm guitar), BJ Zampa (drums), and Chris Vescera (bass). It was engineered by Michael Vescera and mixed by Mike Farona at Musimusic Nashville. Mastering was done by Dave Collins, who has previously worked on Metallica's Hardwired... to Self-Destruct and the Jurassic Park soundtrack.

=== Track listing ===
No.	Title	Guest lead guitarist	Length
1.	"Beauty and the Beast" (from Beauty and the Beast)	Zakk Wylde	3:27
2.	"Under the Sea" (from The Little Mermaid)	Paul Gilbert	3:59
3.	"When You Wish Upon a Star" (from Pinocchio)	Tak Matsumoto	4:12
4.	"A Whole New World" (from Aladdin)	Mike Orlando	3:58
5.	"Someday My Prince Will Come" (from Snow White and the Seven Dwarfs)	Orianthi	3:35
6.	"Hellfire" (from The Hunchback of Notre Dame)	George Lynch	3:32
7.	"Can You Feel the Love Tonight" (from The Lion King)	Richie Kotzen	4:01
8.	"Colors of the Wind" (from Pocahontas)	Jeff Watson	4:07
9.	"Chim Chim Cher-ee" (from Mary Poppins)	Phil X	3:19
10.	"Reflection" (from Mulan)	Ron Thal	4:14
Total length:			38:24
