= Biosphere (disambiguation) =

A biosphere is the part of a planet's shell where all life occurs.

Biosphere may also refer to:

== Music ==
- Biosphere (musician) (born 1962), Norwegian musician
- Biosphere (album), an album by Loudness
- "Biosphere", a song by In Flames from Subterranean

== Other uses ==
- Biosphere (film), a 2022 buddy comedy film
- Montreal Biosphere, a geodesic dome in Montreal, Canada
- The Biosphere, a book by Vladimir Vernadsky
- Sector 1/Biosphere, an area in Metroid: Other M
- Biosphere, a 1986 TRS-80 Color Computer game.

== See also ==
- Bio-Dome, a film based on the idea
- BIOS-3, a man-made biosphere for humans in a closed ecology
- Biosphere 2, an artificial closed ecological system in Oracle, Arizona
- Biosphere reserve or nature reserve
