= D-Metal Stars =

American heavy metal band

- Origin: United States
- Genres: Heavy metal; children's music
- Years active: 2016–present
- Label: Walt Disney Records
- Spinoff of: Animetal USA
- Members: Michael Vescera; John Bruno; Rudy Sarzo; BJ Zampa

D-Metal Stars is an American heavy metal band spin-off of the successful Animetal USA project. The band covers heavy metal versions of popular Disney songs on Walt Disney Records.

== Members ==
- Michael Vescera (Obsession, ex-Yngwie Malmsteen, ex-Loudness, etc..) - Vocals / Backing Vocals / Keyboards
- Rudy Sarzo (ex-Ozzy Osbourne, ex-Whitesnake, ex-Quiet Riot, etc...) - Bass
- John Bruno (Obsession, Michael Vescera, and X Factor X) - Guitar / Backing Vocals
- BJ Zampa (House of Lords, ex-Yngwie Malmsteen, ex-Obsession, and ex-Dokken) - Drums

== Metal Disney ==
Metal Disney

Studio album by D-Metal Stars
- Released: October 5, 2016 (Japan); March 31, 2017 (U.S.)
- Recorded: 2016
- Genres: Heavy metal; children's
- Length: 39:26
- Label: Walt Disney Records

The debut album Metal Disney was released in October 2016 on Walt Disney Records in the Japanese market. It reached No. 3 on the Amazon Japan Hard Rock / Metal Best Sellers chart, and No. 2 on the Children's Chart. The album was then released for the U.S. Market on March 31, 2017 by Universal Music Group landing on the Billboard, iTunes, and Amazon charts.

In June 2017, Metal Disney became a #1 Best Seller on "Amazon Hard Rock & Metal Digital Music Best Sellers" chart.

The album was engineered by Michael Vescera, with assistant engineering by Billy Burke. It was mixed and mastered by Greg Reely, who has previously worked with Sarah McLachlan, Fear Factory, Machine Head, Coldplay, Devin Townsend, and Overkill.

The song "I see the Light" from Disney's Tangled features special guests Demon Kakka on vocals for the second half and Jeff Watson playing guitar solos.

Michael Nunno is featured on "Mickey Mouse March" with a keyboard solo, with additional backing vocals by Michael Vescera's brothers, Nat Vescera, and Gary Vescera, as well as John Bruno's wife, Gail Bruno.

=== Track listing ===
CD
No.	Title	Writer(s)	Original Disney feature	Length
1.	"Introduction"			0:41
2.	"Mickey Mouse March"	Jimmie Dodd	The Mickey Mouse Club	3:27
3.	"I See the Light"	Alan Menken; Glenn Slater	Tangled	4:17
4.	"A Whole New World"	Menken; Tim Rice	Aladdin	3:17
5.	"It's a Small World"	Sherman Brothers	It's a Small World	3:57
6.	"Beauty and the Beast"	Menken; Howard Ashman	Beauty and the Beast	3:54
7.	"Under the Sea"	Menken; Ashman	The Little Mermaid	3:35
8.	"Go the Distance"	Menken; David Zippel	Hercules	4:15
9.	"Can You Feel the Love Tonight"	Rice; Elton John	The Lion King	4:01
10.	"Disney Medley: 1. "Bibbidi-Bobbidi-Boo" (Cinderella); 2. "Heigh-Ho" (Snow White and the Seven Dwarfs); 3. "Supercalifragilisticexpialidocious" (Mary Poppins); 4. "Winnie the Pooh" (Winnie the Pooh and the Honey Tree); 5. "Zip-a-Dee-Doo-Dah" (Song of the South)"	Al Hoffman; Mack David; Jerry Livingston; Larry Morey; Frank Churchill; Sherman Brothers; Ray Gilbert; Allie Wrubel		4:23
11.	"When You Wish Upon a Star"	Ned Washington; Leigh Harline	Pinocchio	3:39
Total length:				39:26

=== Chart positions ===
June 2017

- #1 "Amazon Hard Rock & Metal Digital Music Best Sellers"

April 2017

- #21 "Billboard Kids Albums Chart"
- #10 "Billboard Spotify Viral 50" - Under the Sea
- #21 "Billboard Spotify Viral 50" - Mickey Mouse March
- #26 "Billboard Spotify Viral 50" - It's a Small World
- #92 "iTunes Chart"
- #5 "Amazon Hard Rock & Metal Digital Music Best Sellers"
- #14 "Amazon Rock Digital Music Best Sellers"

October 2016 (Japan Release)

- #3 "Amazon Japan Hard Rock & Metal Best Sellers"
- #2 "Amazon Japan Childrens Best Sellers"

== Related projects ==
Disney Super Guitar

In 2018, Michael Vescera arranged, produced, and played keyboards on Disney Super Guitar (also known in Japan as Super Guitar Disney), along with John Bruno on rhythm guitars, BJ Zampa on drums, and Chris Vescera on bass. This instrumental release features a guest lead guitarist on each song, being: Zakk Wylde, Paul Gilbert, George Lynch, Richie Kotzen, Orianthi, Ron "Bumblefoot" Thal, Mike Orlando, Phil X, Jeff Watson, and Tak Matsumoto. Super Guitar Disney became a #1 Best Seller on the Amazon Japan Anime Chart and a #3 Best Seller on Amazon Japan Rock Chart.

AniMaze X

AniMaze X is the latest project from the members of D-Metal Stars. AniMaze X focuses on a wider variety of musical themes such as superheroes, popular cartoons, classic cover songs, Broadway musicals, movie soundtracks, and the D-Metal Stars "classics". At the end of 2020, AniMaze X released their debut Christmas album AniMazing Xmas, which includes metal renditions of favorite Christmas songs, as well as two original metal Christmas songs. In early 2021, AniMaze X released a reimagined metal version of the Beatles classic "Strawberry Fields Forever".
