= Fly Me to the Moon (Neon Genesis Evangelion) =

Ending theme of the 1995 anime series

- 1995 single cover

Single by Claire Littley / Yōko Takahashi

from the album Neon Genesis Evangelion
- Released: October 25, 1995
- Recorded: June–August 1995
- Venue: London, England
- Genre: Jazz
- Length: 4:33
- Label: Starchild
- Songwriter: Bart Howard
- Producer: Toshimichi Ōtsuki

Claire Littley / Yōko Takahashi singles chronology
"Fly Me to the Moon" (1995)	"A Cruel Angel's Thesis / Fly Me to the Moon" (1995)

"Fly Me to the Moon" is the ending theme of the 1995 anime television series Neon Genesis Evangelion. Written by Bart Howard, the original song was adapted for the series through original arrangements and vocal interpretations. Director Hideaki Anno had considered using it as an ending theme since his work on Nadia: The Secret of Blue Water. Toshiyuki Ōmori arranged the main version, performed by British singer Claire Littley and recorded at Abbey Road Studios in London. The original television series featured fourteen versions, performed by Yōko Takahashi, Megumi Hayashibara, and other vocalists; additional renditions were introduced in subsequent editions of the series. King Records' Starchild label released Claire's main rendition as a single on October 25, 1995, paired with Takahashi's "4 Beat Version"; the same day, it also appeared with the show's opening theme, "A Cruel Angel's Thesis", on a separate split single.

Critics praised the song's contrast with the series' darker subject matter and the variety of its renditions, although some criticized the large number of arrangements released across the series' soundtracks. The various renditions were subsequently released across numerous Evangelion albums. In 2007, Hikaru Utada's "Fly Me to the Moon (In Other Words) -2007 Mix-" accompanied the first trailer for Evangelion: 1.0 You Are (Not) Alone. The 1995 "A Cruel Angel's Thesis / Fly Me to the Moon" single peaked at number 17 on the Oricon Singles Chart and was certified platinum by the Recording Industry Association of Japan (RIAJ), while its 2003 reissue reached number 41. When Netflix began streaming Neon Genesis Evangelion internationally in 2019, licensing issues led to the song's removal from releases outside Japan, prompting criticism from fans; subsequent Western Blu-ray editions also omitted it.

== Background and composition ==
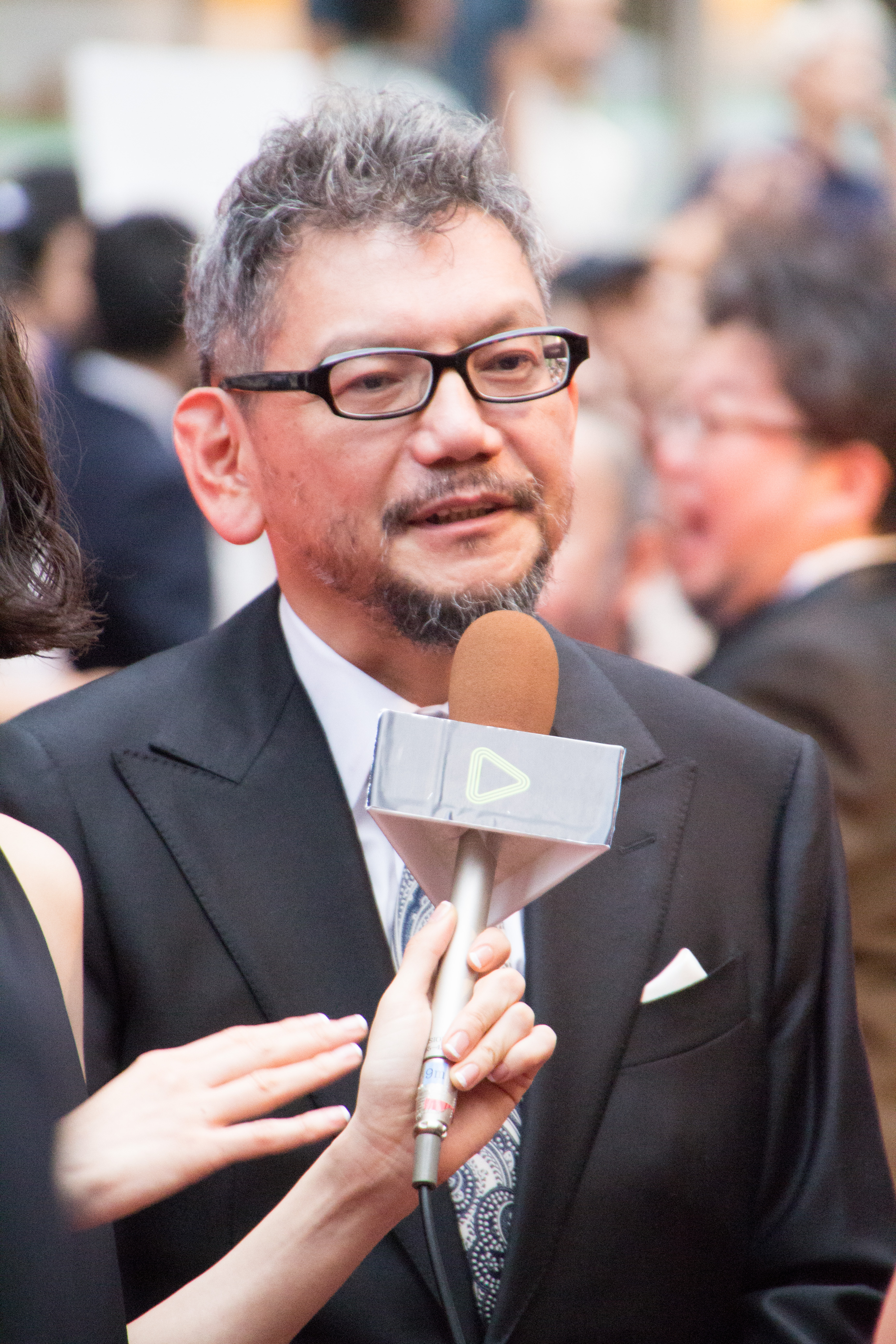
Neon Genesis Evangelion director Hideaki Anno

Hideaki Anno, who directed the anime television series Neon Genesis Evangelion, had considered using "Fly Me to the Moon" as an ending theme for one of his works since working on Nadia: The Secret of Blue Water. He eventually realized the idea with Neon Genesis Evangelion, whose original plans envisioned the Moon as the setting for the story's climax. The initial concept for the finale involved a great lunar battle against twelve enemies known as Apostolos and the discovery of a message written on the Moon's surface, resembling the ending of Gunbuster. An earlier proposal had instead called for the opening theme to change with each episode, an idea Anno compared to the opening theme of Silver Kamen. The production recorded original arrangements and vocal interpretations of "Fly Me to the Moon" for the series. The original episodes of Neon Genesis Evangelion featured fourteen versions of the track in total. At the request of producer Toshimichi Ōtsuki, Toshiyuki Ōmori traveled to London in July 1995 to record the song and find a vocalist. There he met Claire Littley, known as Claire, who subsequently performed the vocals for the main version. Ōmori arranged the main version, which Littley recorded at Abbey Road Studios in London. Its arrangement drew on bossa nova, following the approach of Joe Harnell's rendition of the song. Ōmori also created additional versions in different musical styles.

Japanese singer Yōko Takahashi became involved with Neon Genesis Evangelion after returning from six months of vocal training in Los Angeles. She had known Ōmori since before her professional debut and regarded him as a longtime mentor. Through Ōmori's connections, she was approached to participate in the "Fly Me to the Moon" project. Ōmori enlisted jazz pianist Makoto Kuriya, who had recently returned to Japan, to perform the piano part. Megumi Hayashibara, the voice of Rei Ayanami, performed the "Rei #5 Version" and "Rei #6 Version" for the fifth and sixth episodes, respectively. The two versions use essentially the same arrangement, with minor differences in their mixing. She also sang three other versions for "Rei III" and the final two episodes. Hayashibara recalled that during one recording session, Anno instructed her to portray the "third" Rei with an even colder vocal performance than the second. Takahashi performed the jazz-influenced "4 Beat Version" for the seventh and twelfth episodes, both of which focus on Misato Katsuragi. Aya performed the "Aya Bossa Techno Version" for "Asuka Strikes!", combining bossa nova and techno with a playful, childlike vocal performance and French pop influences. Other arrangements drew on acid house. Takahashi also sang the "Yoko Takahashi Version", which retained the orchestral component of Littley's rendition with a slightly different mix, and the bossa nova-based "Yoko Takahashi Acid Bossa Version", which created a more mature atmosphere than Aya's childlike rendition. For the "Aki Jungle TV Size Version", staff incorporated jungle beats, a club sound popular at the time. The production initially created the longer "Aki Jungle Version" for an album. At Anno's request, the staff adapted it into the 65-second television ending format for the seventeenth episode and created an alternate edit without the introduction and with a different ending.

In 2003, Gainax released a new edition of the series titled Renewal of Evangelion, which included a bonus disc containing various extras. The extras included a remastered, creditless version of "Fly Me to the Moon". Later Japanese releases also included the remastered version, including the series' 2015 Blu-ray box set. The Renewal Edition introduced new versions of the piece. For example, the sixteenth episode, "Splitting of the Breast", uses the "Main Version II/TV Size for Renewal #16" version, an edit of a recording included on the limited edition of Neon Genesis Evangelion Addition. Noel Kirkpatrick of TV Guide considered the various renditions of the track a respite from the intensity of the series' later episodes and felt that the song captured the desire for connection that permeates Neon Genesis Evangelion. Kambole Campbell of the British Film Institute described the different renditions as ranging from "haunting" to "bizarre" and observed that their hopefulness became increasingly apparent as the series grew bleaker. Michael McWhertor of Polygon noted a similar contrast between the song's upbeat rhythms and the dark cliffhangers that precede the series' ending credits. The various versions of "Fly Me to the Moon" are:

Episode		Vocal		Version	
Episode		Original	Renewal	Original	Renewal
#1		Claire Littley		Normal	
#2		Claire Littley		Normal	Normal (without Strings)
#3		Claire Littley	Yōko Takahashi	Normal	
#4		Claire Littley	Yōko Takahashi	Normal	Normal (without strings)
#5		Megumi Hayashibara		Rei #5	
#6		Megumi Hayashibara		Rei #6	
#7		Yōko Takahashi		4 Beat	
#8		Aya		Bossa Techno	
#9		Yōko Takahashi	Yūko Miyamura	Acid Bossa	Bossa Techno
#10		Yōko Takahashi	Yūko Miyamura	Normal	Normal Orchestra (with chorus)
#11		Claire Littley	Kotono Mitsuishi, Megumi Hayashibara and Yūko Miyamura	Normal	Normal Orchestra (#1)
#12		Yōko Takahashi	Kotono Mitsuishi	4 Beat	Normal Orchestra (with chorus)
#13		Yōko Takahashi		Acid Bossa	
#14		Yōko Takahashi	Megumi Hayashibara	Normal	Normal Orchestra (solo)
#15		Off Vocal	Kotono Mitsuishi	4 Beat	
#16		Off Vocal	Kotono Mitsuishi, Megumi Hayashibara and Yūko Miyamura	Normal	Normal Orchestra (Interlude Start ~ #1 Second Half)
#17		Aki		Jungle	
#18		Claire Littley	Off Vocal	Normal	B-4 guitar & piano
#19		Claire Littley	Kotono Mitsuishi, Megumi Hayashibara and Yūko Miyamura	Normal	Normal Orchestra (#2)
#20		(Off Vocal)		B-22 A-Type	B-4 piano
#21	On-Air	Yōko Takahashi	Off-Vocal	Normal	4 Beat
#21	Director's Cut (#21’)	(Off Vocal)		4 Beat (90 seconds)	
#22	On-Air	Aya		Bossa Techno	
#22	Director's Cut (#22’)	(Off Vocal)		Bossa Techno (80 seconds)	
#23	On-Air	Megumi Hayashibara		Rei #23	
#23	Director's Cut (#23’)	Megumi Hayashibara		Rei #23 (90 seconds)	
#24	On-Air	(Off Vocal)		Normal	
#24	Director's Cut (#24’)	(Off Vocal)		Normal (90 seconds)	
#25		Megumi Hayashibara		Rei #25	
#26		Megumi Hayashibara		Rei #26	

== Release and music video ==
A frame from the ending sequence of Neon Genesis Evangelion, showing Rei Ayanami's silhouette and the Moon.

Masayuki, who served as an assistant director on Neon Genesis Evangelion, directed the series' ending sequence set to "Fly Me to the Moon". The sequence depicts the Moon reflected on the surface of the water and the silhouette of Rei Ayanami. For the eighth and ninth episodes, which introduce and focus on Asuka Langley Soryu, the sequence shifts to red, a color associated with Asuka; the other episodes use a blue background instead. When Netflix began streaming Neon Genesis Evangelion internationally in 2019, it omitted "Fly Me to the Moon" from the ending sequence outside Japan because of licensing issues and replaced it with a piano piece from Shirō Sagisu's score associated with Rei Ayanami. Subsequent Western Blu-ray releases likewise omitted the song and used the same instrumental piano music over the ending credits.

King Records' Starchild label first released "Fly Me to the Moon" commercially in Japan on October 25, 1995. The single (KIDA-115) paired Claire Littley's main rendition with Yōko Takahashi's "4 Beat Version" and off-vocal versions of both recordings. That same day, Claire's rendition appeared alongside Takahashi's opening theme "A Cruel Angel's Thesis" on a separate split single (KIDA-116), marketed as a release containing the opening and ending themes of Neon Genesis Evangelion. King Records reissued the pairing as a CD single on March 26, 2003, adding off-vocal versions of both songs and the "Director's Edit Version" of "A Cruel Angel's Thesis".

The song and its arrangements also appeared throughout the Neon Genesis Evangelion soundtrack series. The first soundtrack album, released on December 6, 1995, included Claire Littley's main rendition, an instrumental arrangement, and Yōko Takahashi's "Acid Bossa Version"; Neon Genesis Evangelion II, released on February 16, 1996, added further television-size and character versions. Neon Genesis Evangelion III, released on May 22, 1996, contained several instrumental derivatives of the song. Neon Genesis Evangelion Addition, released on December 21, 1996, featured the "Misato 4 Beat TV. Size Version", "Asuka Bossa Techno TV. Size Version", and "Main Version II". The box set Neon Genesis Evangelion: S² Works, issued on December 4, 1998, contained further arrangements. Claire's recording subsequently appeared on the September 13, 2000 compilation Evangelion: The Day of Second Impact, on the 2000 compilation Star Child Selection Music Edition: TV Works and, five years later, on Neon Genesis Evangelion Decade, released on October 26, 2005. Between them, the July 24, 2003 compilation Refrain of Evangelion collected the television-size "Aya Bossa Techno" and "Aki Jungle" versions and "Main Version II/Renewal #16". The A.T. EVA01 Reference CD included a remaster of Claire's rendition in 2007. The Neon Genesis Evangelion Soundtrack 25th Anniversary Box, released on October 7, 2020, also reissued many of the original vocal and instrumental arrangements, with the exception of Claire's recording.

== Critical reception and legacy ==
Mike Fahey of Kotaku described Claire Littley's rendition as light and dreamlike, praising its performance and arrangement as an effective counterpoint to the series' often heavy subject matter. Austin Jones of The A.V. Club retrospectively credited Neon Genesis Evangelion with transforming "Fly Me to the Moon" into something distinctive and essential. Michael Rougeau of GameSpot also called the song "distinctive". Eric Vilas-Boas of Vulture described the ending sequence as a fascinating example of anime music supervision and said that its various renditions quickly became anime classics in their own right, both in Japan and in the United States. CDJournal praised the practice of varying the rendition of "Fly Me to the Moon" between episodes to reflect their content, regarding it as evidence of particular attention to detail. Oscar Gonzalez of CNET described "Fly Me to the Moon" as the series' "iconic" outro. Kara Dennison of Otaku USA described Megumi Hayashibara's rendition of "Fly Me to the Moon" as soothing and regarded the song as probably the most high-profile pre-existing piece of music used in Evangelion. Corey Plante of Inverse described Claire Littley's rendition as "flowing" and "wonderful", and characterized the song as an emotional reset after the series' traumatic events and an essential part of Neon Genesis Evangelion.

Jonathan Mays of Anime News Network criticized the proliferation of "Fly Me to the Moon" arrangements across the Evangelion soundtracks. Reviewing Neon Genesis Evangelion II, he wondered whether its five renditions represented "too much of a great song or too much of a tired classic", concluding that "either way, it's too much". For Neon Genesis Evangelion III, Mays argued that Gainax had "milked" the once-novel ending theme "to the bone" with fourteen more remixes and criticized Yōko Takahashi's English pronunciation. By contrast, in his review of The Day of Second Impact, he welcomed its single rendition and called Claire's full-length recording "the best of the bunch". Orin Starchaser of EX also objected to the number of arrangements. Reviewing Neon Genesis Evangelion II, he strongly criticized the "Aya Bossa Techno Version", but called the markedly different "Aki Jungle Version" an "excellent song". For Neon Genesis Evangelion III, he considered all thirteen renditions less than "sterling", calling the instrumental "B-22a Type" potentially the best of them and describing the "Aya London Beat Version" as the second-worst version of the song he had heard.

CDJournal highlighted Hikaru Utada's rendition as one of the noteworthy tracks on the "Beautiful World / Kiss & Cry" single. Reviewing Evangelion: 1.0 You Are (Not) Alone and discussing Utada's theme song "Beautiful World", Carlo Santos of Anime News Network remarked that "everyone was already sick of 'Fly Me to the Moon' anyway". In 2013, LisAni! reviewed the high-resolution remaster of the first Neon Genesis Evangelion soundtrack and praised the increased depth and luster of Claire Littley's vocals, as well as Makoto Kuriya's delicate piano playing and the smooth strings. In 2019, the omission of "Fly Me to the Moon" from Netflix's international release drew criticism from longtime fans, and became one of the points of contention surrounding the new English version. Discussing the removal, scholar Ida Kirkegaard wrote that the Netflix release was met with "fan outrage". Joshua Meyer of SlashFilm described "Fly Me to the Moon" as an integral part of the series' original ending and said he could understand why U.S. fans decried its loss from the Netflix release. Anime UK News reviewer Ian Wolf similarly described the loss of Claire Littley's ending theme as bad news for some viewers. Keith Mitchell of The Outerhaven called the song "iconic to the series" and said that, after watching the series without it, "it just doesn't have the same effect". IGN's Matt Kim also criticized the omission, writing, "That's like running all of those episodes of Friends without the opening theme song, Netflix". In a 2016 survey conducted by the Japanese music magazine CD & DL Data among 6,203 respondents, the Evangelion versions of "Fly Me to the Moon", credited to Claire Littley, Yōko Takahashi, and other performers, ranked seventh among songs most associated with the Moon. Claire's rendition received the Planning Award for the 1989–1999 period at the 2019 Heisei Anisong Grand Prize, an awards project recognizing anime songs from Japan's Heisei era. Two years later, producer Ayumi Sano said that the idea of varying the ending theme in each episode of the 2021 television drama Ōmameda Towako and Her Three Ex-Husbands came from the multiple versions of "Fly Me to the Moon" in Neon Genesis Evangelion.

== Other versions and covers ==
Takahashi's 1996 album Living with Joy included a version named "Night in Indigo Blue Version". It later appeared on Best Pieces II (1999), Golden Best Yoko Takahashi (2004), Yoko Takahashi Best 10 (2007), and Yoko Takahashi Best Selection (2008). Her 1997 album Li-La included another rendition, which later appeared on Super Value Yoko Takahashi in 2001. Takahashi's 1997 album 〜refrain〜 The songs were inspired by "Evangelion" included the "Touched by the Muse Mix", while the London Street Singers performed the "On the Street" version. Symphony of Evangelion featured a rendition by Carroll Thompson and Loren. In 1998, Makoto Kuriya released an instrumental arrangement on his album Antitheses. Hayashibara's 1996 album Bertemu included the "Ayanami Version". It later appeared on Vintage A (2000) and Vintage Denim (2021). The 2001 compilation Evangelion: The Birthday of Rei Ayanami also included the "Ayanami Version", alongside an arrangement by Makoto Kuriya.

In 2007, Hikaru Utada revisited "Fly Me to the Moon" for Evangelion: 1.0 You Are (Not) Alone, the first film in the Rebuild of Evangelion series. Her "Fly Me to the Moon (In Other Words) -2007 Mix-", a remix of a rendition previously released on her 2000 single "Wait & See (Risk)", accompanied the film's first trailer. In 2009, Takahashi released the "2009 Version" and its off-vocal counterpart on the single "A Cruel Angel's Thesis 2009 Version". A jazz arrangement appeared on The World! Evangelion Jazz Night =The Tokyo III Jazz Club= in 2014. For Evangelion Finally (2020), Takahashi recorded a new full-length rendition of the original arrangement of "Fly Me to the Moon"; her "Acid Bossa Version" had previously been her only full-length recording of the song. Takahashi had continued performing the original arrangement in concert and incorporated a wordless vocal improvisation into its instrumental interlude. She reproduced this addition for the new recording, describing the result as a version that had "evolved within" her. Titled "Fly Me to the Moon 2020", the recording later appeared on the Neon Genesis Evangelion Soundtrack 25th Anniversary Box, Evangelion Flashback, and Takahashi's "A Cruel Angel's Thesis" Evangelion 30th Anniversary Edition LP, released in limited-edition colored-vinyl and standard editions on February 21, 2026.

Other artists also recorded covers of the song. Yoko Ishida recorded it for the 2001 album Ultra Anime Eurobeat Series: Mecha Max, where it appeared as the third track. Saori Hayami, as her The Idolmaster Cinderella Girls character Kaede Takagaki, recorded the song for the 2018 album Cinderella Party! Derepa Ondo Don Don Ka, where it appeared as the fifth track. Jazz saxophonist Yucco Miller performed both vocals and alto saxophone on a rendition arranged by Hiroki Nakamura for her 2021 album Colorful Drops. Ichirou Mizuki and Hiroko Moriguchi also sang a duet of "Fly Me to the Moon" from Neon Genesis Evangelion during a studio live performance on the television program Anison Days.

== Track listings ==
All tracks on the KIDA-115 single were arranged by Toshiyuki Ōmori.

All tracks are written by Bart Howard.

"Fly Me to the Moon" single (KIDA-115)
No.	Title	Performer	Length
1.	"Fly Me to the Moon"	Claire Littley	4:33
2.	"Fly Me to the Moon (4 Beat Version)"	Yōko Takahashi	4:39
3.	"Fly Me to the Moon (Off Vocal Version)"		4:32
4.	"Fly Me to the Moon (4 Beat Version) (Off Vocal Version)"		4:37
Total length:			18:21

"A Cruel Angel's Thesis" / "Fly Me to the Moon" single (KIDA-116)
No.	Title	Writer(s)	Performer	Length
1.	"A Cruel Angel's Thesis"	Neko Oikawa (lyrics), Hidetoshi Satō (music)	Yōko Takahashi	4:05
2.	"Fly Me to the Moon"	Bart Howard	Claire Littley	4:33
Total length:				8:38

"A Cruel Angel's Thesis" / "Fly Me to the Moon" renewal single (KICM-3041)
No.	Title	Writer(s)	Performer	Length
1.	"A Cruel Angel's Thesis"	Neko Oikawa (lyrics), Hidetoshi Satō (music)	Yōko Takahashi	4:05
2.	"Fly Me to the Moon"	Bart Howard	Claire Littley	4:33
3.	"A Cruel Angel's Thesis (Off Vocal Version)"	Neko Oikawa (lyrics), Hidetoshi Satō (music)		4:05
4.	"Fly Me to the Moon (Off Vocal Version)"	Bart Howard		4:33
5.	"A Cruel Angel's Thesis (Director's Edit Version)"	Neko Oikawa (lyrics), Hidetoshi Satō (music)	Yōko Takahashi	4:04
Total length:				20:52

== Charts ==
Weekly chart performance for "A Cruel Angel's Thesis / Fly Me to the Moon"
Chart (1995)	Peak position
Japan (Oricon)	17

Weekly chart performance for "A Cruel Angel's Thesis / Fly Me to the Moon" (2003 reissue)
Chart (2003)	Peak position
Japan (Oricon)	41

== Certifications ==
Region	Certification	Certified units/sales
Japan (RIAJ)	Platinum	400,000^{^}
^{*} Sales figures based on certification alone.
