= Animetal USA =

American heavy metal band based in Japan

- Origin: Japan
- Genres: Heavy metal; anison
- Years active: 2011–2016 (on hiatus)
- Label: Sony Music Entertainment
- Members: Michael Vescera; Chris Impellitteri; Rudy Sarzo; Jon Dette
- Past members: Scott Travis

Animetal USA (アニメタルUSA, Animetaru Yū Esu Ē) is a Japan-based American heavy metal band formed as a tribute to Eizo Sakamoto's band Animetal. They made their world debut at the 2011 Loud Park Festival, where they performed on stage with Momoiro Clover Z.

The band's original members consisted of lead vocalist Michael Vescera (of Obsession, formerly of Loudness and Yngwie Malmsteen), guitarist Chris Impellitteri (of Impellitteri), bassist Rudy Sarzo (formerly of Quiet Riot, Ozzy Osbourne, Whitesnake, and the Geoff Tate lineup of Queensrÿche) and drummer Scott Travis (of Judas Priest and Racer X). In 2012, Travis departed the band to tour with Judas Priest and was replaced by Killing Machine and former Slayer and Testament drummer Jon Dette.

== History ==
Their debut self-titled album was released on October 12, 2011, and features English-language heavy metal covers of several anime theme songs, ranging from Devilman's Debiruman no Uta to Dragon Ball's "Makafushigi Adventure!" to Neon Genesis Evangelion's "A Cruel Angel's Thesis". The songs were arranged by Impellitteri and former Megadeth guitarist Marty Friedman. When the second album was in production, the band asked their Japanese and American fans to submit requests for songs they should cover on it.

In March 2012 it was revealed that the band have collaborated with Hironobu Kageyama of JAM Project to provide the opening theme to the Naruto anime spin-off series Rock Lee & His Ninja Pals. This song was released as a single and also was included on their second album released in Japan in June 2012.

In the summer of 2012, the band teamed up with JAM Project for a limited national concert tour called the Japan-America Anison Summit (日米アニソンサミット, Nichi-Bei Anison Samitto).

In November 2013, Animetal USA signed with Warner Bros. Records for their third album, that was planned for release in 2014. However, there has been no further news since then about whether the album will ever be released.

In 2016, a spin off project was launched called D-Metal Stars; the band features Vescera, Sarzo, guitarist John Bruno (Obsession), and drummer BJ Zampa (House of Lords, formerly of Obsession, Yngwie Malmsteen, and Dokken). The band covers heavy metal versions of popular Disney songs on Walt Disney Records. The song "I see the Light" from Tangled features special guests Demon Kakka (Seikima-II) and Jeff Watson (Night Ranger). The debut album Metal Disney was released in October 2016 in the Japanese market. Since its release it has reached as high as #3 on the Amazon Japan Hard Rock / Metal Best Sellers chart, and #2 on the Children's Chart. The "Metal Disney" album was then released in the US through Universal Music Group UMG on March 31, 2017. The album charted 3 songs on the Billboard Spotify Viral 50 and climbed as high as #21 on the Billboard Kid Albums chart.

== Personnel ==
Last lineup

- Michael Vescera as Metal-Rider - lead vocals (2011–2016)
- Chris Impellitteri as Speed-King - guitar (2011–2016)
- Rudy Sarzo as Storm-Bringer - bass (2011–2016)
- Jon Dette as Tank #2 - drums (2012–2016)

Former members

- Scott Travis as Tank #1 - drums (2011–2012)

== Discography ==
- Animetal USA (2011)
- Animetal USA W (2012)
