= Racing (album) =

Studio album by Loudness
- Released: November 26, 2004 (Japan); April 06, 2005 (Europe)
- Studio: Paradise Studio and Freedom Studio, Tokyo, Japan
- Genre: Heavy metal, speed metal
- Length: 67:39
- Language: Japanese / English
- Label: Tokuma Japan; Drakkar (worldwide)
- Producer: Loudness, Junji Tada

Loudness chronology
Rockshocks (2004)	Racing (2004)	Breaking the Taboo (2006)

English version cover

Professional ratings
Review scores
Source	Rating
AllMusic	3.5/5 stars

Racing (音速, Onsoku) is the nineteenth studio album by the Japanese heavy metal band Loudness. It was released in 2004 in Japan. On April 6, 2005, the band released the English version of the album, the first entirely sung in English since 2001. An international edition was released on August 9, 2005, published by Drakkar, with a different track listing, a different cover and little differences in the production of the solo parts. The album cover marks the return of the band's classic logo, which was originally used from 1985 to 1988. A special international release of the album contains as bonus tracks the entire Rockshocks album of self-covers from the 1980s.

== Track listings ==
Music by Akira Takasaki, lyrics by Minoru Niihara

=== Japanese release ===
1. "Racing" - 00:29
2. "Exultation" - 4:42
3. "Lunatic" - 4:06
4. "Believe It or Not" - 4:52
5. "Power Generation" - 4:03
6. "Speed Maniac" - 5:19
7. "Live for the Moment" - 4:39
8. "Crazy Samurai" - 5:21
9. "Tomorrow Is Not Promised" - 6:31
10. "Telomerase" - 5:50
11. "R.I.P." - 5:15
12. "Misleading Man" - 6:20
13. "Don't Know Nothing" - 6:07
14. "Unknown Civilians" - 3:58

=== International release ===
1. "Racing"
2. "Exultation"
3. "Lunatic"
4. "Live for the Moment"
5. "Crazy Samurai"
6. "Speed Maniac"
7. "R.I.P."
8. "Telomerase"
9. "Tomorrow Is Not Promised"
10. "Believe It or Not"
11. "Misleading Man"
12. "Power Generation"
13. "Don't Know Nothing"
14. "Unknown Civilians"

== Personnel ==
Loudness

- Minoru Niihara - vocals
- Akira Takasaki - guitars
- Masayoshi Yamashita - bass
- Munetaka Higuchi - drums

Production

- Masatoshi Sakimoto - engineer, mixing
- Masayoshi Sugai, Yuki Mitome - assistant engineers
- Yoichi Aikawa - mastering
- Norikazu Shimano, Shinji Hamasaki - supervisors
- Junji Tada - executive producer
