= King of Pain (album) =

Studio album by Loudness
- Released: May 19, 2010
- Recorded: 2009 – March 2010
- Studio: Village Studio and Rojam Studio, Tokyo, Japan
- Genre: Heavy metal, progressive metal
- Length: 60:53
- Label: Tokuma Japan Communications
- Producer: Akira Takasaki, Kiyomasa Shinoki, Keiichi Oriuchi

Loudness chronology
Live Loudest at the Budokan '91 (2009)	King of Pain (2010)	Eve to Dawn (2011)

King of Pain (因果応報, Ingaōhō) is the twenty-third studio album by Japanese heavy metal band Loudness. It was released on May 19, 2010 only in Japan and marks the full-length debut of drummer Masayuki Suzuki. Guitarist Akira Takasaki would later say King of Pain was focused on featuring Suzuki. The album reached number 21 on the Oricon chart.

== Track listing ==
All music written by Akira Takasaki, lyrics as indicated

1. "Requiem" (instrumental) - 2:59
2. "The King of Pain" (Minoru Niihara, Bob Dyer) - 5:30
3. "Power of Death" (Niihara, Takashi Kanazawa) - 4:21
4. "Death Machine" (Niihara, Kanazawa) - 5:42
5. "Doodlebug" (Niihara, Kanazawa) - 5:07
6. "Rule the World" (Niihara, Kanazawa) - 3:11
7. "Straight Out of Our Soul" (Niihara, Ken Ayugai) - 3:51
8. "Where Am I Going?" (Niihara, JJ) - 3:50
9. "Emma" (Niihara, Kanazawa) - 5:25
10. "Naraka" (Niihara, Kanazawa) - 3:34
11. "Doctor from Hell" (Niihara, Ray Higa) - 4:32
12. "Hell Fire" (Niihara, Bob Dyer) - 4:19
13. "#666" (Niihara, Kanazawa) - 3:30
14. "Never Comes" (Niihara, Kanazawa) - 5:02

== Personnel ==
Loudness

- Minoru Niihara – vocals
- Akira Takasaki – guitar, vocals on "Where Am I Going?"
- Masayoshi Yamashita – bass
- Masayuki Suzuki – drums

Production

- Masatoshi Sakimoto – engineer, mixing
- Yuki Mitome – assistant engineer
- Kazuhiro Yamagata – mastering
- Kiyomasa Shinoki, Keiichi Oriuchi – executive producers
