= Metal Mad =

Studio album by Loudness
- Released: February 20, 2008
- Studio: R & C Studio
- Genre: Heavy metal, progressive metal
- Length: 53:41
- Label: Tokuma Japan
- Producer: Loudness, Kiyomasa Shinoki

Loudness chronology
Breaking the Taboo (2006)	Metal Mad (2008)	The Everlasting (2009)

Metal Mad is the twenty-first studio album by Japanese heavy metal band Loudness. It was released in 2008 only in Japan. It would be the last album before Munetaka Higuchi's death in November 2008.

The album was rated a 3 out of 5 by Danderdog.

== Track listing ==
Music by Akira Takasaki, lyrics by Minoru Niihara

1. "Fire of Spirit" (instrumental) - 2:58
2. "Metal Mad" - 4:11
3. "High Flyer" - 5:06
4. "Spellbound #9" - 5:45
5. "Crimson Paradox" - 4:34
6. "Black and White" - 4:44
7. "Whatsoever" - 5:06
8. "Call of the Reaper" - 4:06
9. "Can't Find My Way" - 7:02
10. "Gravity" - 5:21
11. "Transformation" - 4:48

== Personnel ==
Loudness

- Minoru Niihara - vocals
- Akira Takasaki - guitars
- Masayoshi Yamashita - bass
- Munetaka Higuchi - drums

Production

- Masatoshi Sakimoto - engineer, mixing
- Yuki Mitome - assistant engineer
- Yasuji Yasuman Maeda - mastering
- Hirose Shiraishi - supervisor
- Kiyomasa Shinoki - executive producer
- Steve Johnstad, Takashi Kanazawa - lyrics translations
