= The Everlasting (album) =

Studio album by Loudness
- Released: May 27, 2009
- Recorded: January–April 2009
- Studio: Village Studio, Tokyo, Japan
- Genre: Heavy metal, progressive metal
- Length: 60:22
- Label: Tokuma Japan
- Producer: Akira Takasaki, Masahiro Shinoki

Loudness chronology
Metal Mad (2008)	The Everlasting (2009)	Live Loudest at the Budokan '91 (2009)

The Everlasting (魂宗久遠, Konsō kuon) is the twenty-second studio album by Japanese heavy metal band Loudness. It was released in 2009 after the death of original drummer Munetaka Higuchi, whose pre-recorded drum tracks were used on this album. Some tracks, however, feature the work of Higuchi's successor, Masayuki Suzuki. The 15th and last album recorded by the original line-up, The Everlasting reached a peak position of 50 on the Billboard Japan Top Album Sales chart. The album features a quasi-return to their 1980s sound in "Flame of Rock" and "I Wonder". The cover artwork is inspired by a Thailand's sculpture called "Budda Head in Tree".

== Track listing ==
Music by Akira Takasaki, lyrics by Minoru Niihara

1. "Hit the Rails" - 4:15
2. "Flame of Rock" - 4:47
3. "I Wonder" - 5:08
4. "The Everlasting" - 5:33
5. "Life Goes On" - 4:24
6. "Let It Rock" - 4:06
7. "Crystal Moon" - 4:44
8. "Change"- 6:56
9. "Rock into the Night" - 3:27
10. "I'm in Pain" - 5:22
11. "Thunder Burn" - 5:21
12. "Desperate Religion" - 6:19

== Personnel ==
Loudness

- Minoru Niihara - vocals
- Akira Takasaki - guitars, vocals on "The Everlasting", producer
- Masayoshi Yamashita - bass
- Munetaka Higuchi - drums
- Masayuki Suzuki - drums on "I Wonder"

Production

- Masatoshi Sakimoto - engineer, mixing
- Yuki Mitome - assistant engineer
- Kazuhiro Yamagata - mastering
- Masahiro Shinoki - executive producer
