= Michael Vescera =

American singer and record producer

Mike Vescera
- Born: Michael Anthony Vescera; June 13, 1962 (age 64); Connecticut, U.S.
- Genres: Rock, hard rock, heavy metal
- Occupations: Musician, record producer
- Instruments: Vocals, keyboards
- Years active: 1984–present
- Formerly of: Obsession, Loudness, Yngwie Malmsteen, Dr. Sin, Killing Machine, Mike Vescera Project, The Reign of Terror, Roland Grapow, Empires of Eden, Super Guitar Disney, Disney Super Guitar, AniMaze X, Animetal USA, D-Metal Stars
- Website: Facebook Official

Michael Vescera (born June 13, 1962) is an American heavy metal singer for various bands and projects like Loudness (Soldier of Fortune, On the Prowl, Live at the Budokan), Obsession (Marshall Law, Scarred for Life, Methods of Madness, Carnival of Lies, Order of Chaos), Yngwie Malmsteen (The Seventh Sign, Magnum Opus), Dr. Sin (Dr. Sin II), Roland Grapow (Kaleidoscope) or his own band MVP (Mike Vescera Project).

Besides being a vocalist, Vescera also works as a record producer: his recent collaborations include artists such as Metal Mike Chlasiak and Bobby Jarzombek (Halford, Sebastian Bach, Fates Warning) and their soon to be released Pain Museum album, Bobby Blotzer's (Ratt) & John Corabi's (Mötley Crüe, The Scream) Twenty4Seven CD, Magnitude Nine's forthcoming album Decoding the Soul, Reign of Terror (featuring Joe Stump) and Killing Machine (featuring Stet Howland and Mike Duda of W.A.S.P.). Michael has his studio "The Toy Room" in Nashville Tennessee as well as a satellite studio "Toy Room North" in Milford, Connecticut.

Vescera covered "Get a Life" by Siam Shade for the 2010 tribute album, Siam Shade Tribute. In mid-2011, while also continuing with his band OBSESSION, Mike joined (ANIMETAL USA) (Sony Music), playing heavy metal versions of Japanese Anime theme songs. (Following in the steps of the Japanese project Animetal.) This project features Rudy Sarzo on bass, Scott Travis on drums (Later Jon Dette on Drums), and Chris Impelliterri on guitar. In 2012, he collaborated with Sovereign's guitar player Samir Mhamdi, performing all the vocals on the album Warring Heaven.

In mid 2016, in a spin off of the Animetal USA project, Vescera with Rudy Sarzo on bass, John Bruno (Obsession) on guitar, and BJ Zampa (House of Lords) on drums, recorded a new project. This project D-Metal Stars "Metal Disney" was released in October 2016 on Walt Disney Records in the Japanese market. The album was then released for the US Market on March 31, 2017, by UMG, Universal Music Group landing on the Billboard, iTunes, and Amazon charts.

In 2018, Vescera produced, arranged, and played keyboards for a rock guitar project called "Disney Super Guitar" (titled "Super Guitar Disney" in Japanese market). This is an instrumental release featuring a guest lead guitarist on each song.

== Discography ==
Year	Band	Title	Note
1984	Obsession	Marshall Law	Studio
1986	Obsession	Scarred for Life	Studio
1987	Obsession	Methods of Madness	Studio
1988	Theatre	Theatre	Demo
1989	Loudness	Soldier of Fortune	Studio
1991	Loudness	On the Prowl	Studio
1991	Loudness	Slap in the Face	EP
2009	Loudness	Live Loudest at the Budokan '91	Live
1994	Yngwie Malmsteen	The Seventh Sign	Studio
1994	Yngwie Malmsteen	Live at Budokan	Live, VHS/DVD
1994	Yngwie Malmsteen	I Can't Wait	EP
1995	Yngwie Malmsteen	Magnum Opus	Studio
1997	MVP (Mike Vescera Project)	Windows	Studio
1999	MVP (Mike Vescera Project)	Animation	Studio
1999	Roland Grapow	Kaleidoscope	Studio
2000	Killing Machine	Killing Machine	Studio
2000	Dr. Sin	Dr. Sin II	Studio
2002	Dr. Sin	Shadows of Light (American and European version of Dr. Sin II)	Studio
2001	The Reign of Terror	Sacred Ground	Studio
2002	The Reign of Terror	Conquer and Divide	Studio
2002	Palace of Black	Palace of Black	Studio
2003	MVP (Mike Vescera Project)	The Altar	Studio
2004	MVP (Mike Vescera Project)	Crossing the Line	Studio
2004	Safe Haven	Safe Haven	Studio
2005	Dr. Sin	Insinity	Guest Vocal, Track 8
2006	Obsession	Carnival of Lies	Studio
2007	Stygia	Stygia	Demo
2008	Obsession	Obsession	Compilation
2008	Michael Vescera	A Sign of Things to Come	Studio
2010	Empires of Eden	Reborn in Fire	Guest Vocal, Track 1
2011	Animetal USA	Animetal USA	Studio
2012	Animetal USA	Animetal USA W	Studio
2012	Soulspell	Act III: Hollow's Gathering	Guest Vocal
2012	Obsession	Order of Chaos	Studio
2012	Fatal Force	Unholy Rites	Studio
2012	SOVEREIGN	Warring Heaven	Studio
2012	Chris Bickley	Tapestry of souls	Guest Vocal
2013	Signum Regis	Exodus	Guest Vocal, Track 3
2013	Warrion	Awakening the Hydra	Studio
2013	Nergard	Memorial for a Wish	Guest Vocal, Track 4
2013	Silent Voices	Reveal the Change	Guest Vocal, Track 3
2016	D-Metal Stars	Metal Disney	Studio
2017	Vescera	Beyond the Fight	Studio
2017	Sammy Berell	Passion Dreams	Studio
2018	Schubert In Rock	Commander of Pain	Guest Vocal, Track 9
2018	Kiko Shred	The Stride	Guest Vocal, Track 9
2018	Disney Super Guitar	Disney Super Guitar	Producer and Keys
2019	Magic Kingdom	Metalmighty	Studio
2019	Dramatica	Fall of Tyranny	Studio
2020	Dramatica	Beyond the Eyes of Deception	Studio
2020	AniMaze X	AniMazing Xmas	Studio
2023	SOVEREIGN	Battle In Sumeria	Studio
