= Live Loudest at the Budokan '91 =

Live album by Loudness
- Released: December 23, 2009
- Recorded: May 31, 1991
- Venue: Nippon Budokan, Tokyo, Japan
- Genre: Heavy metal
- Length: 70:33
- Label: Warner Music Japan
- Producer: Loudness

Loudness chronology
The Everlasting (2009)	Live Loudest at the Budokan '91 (2009)	King of Pain (2010)

Live Loudest at the Budokan '91 is the eighth live album by the Japanese heavy metal band Loudness. It was released at the end of 2009 as a package of a CD and a DVD, with recordings and footage from a concert held in Tokyo Budokan during the 1991 tour to promote the On the Prowl album, with Mike Vescera on vocals.

== Track listing ==
CD

1. "Down 'n' Dirty" - 5:00
2. "Playin' Games" - 5:13
3. "In the Mirror" - 3:43
4. "Never Again" - 5:44
5. "Crazy Night" - 4:32
6. "So Lonely" - 5:33
7. "Crazy Doctor" - 6:04
8. "Loudness" - 8:26
9. "Find a Way" - 8:55
10. "Sleepless Night" - 7:40
11. "Soldier of Fortune" - 4:29
12. "Slap in the Face" (bonus studio track) - 5:14

DVD

- "Love Toys"
- "Take It or Leave It"
- "Never Again"
- "Sleepless Night"
- "Down 'n' Dirty" (music video)
- "In the Mirror" (music video)
- "You Shook Me" (music video)

== Personnel ==
Loudness

- Mike Vescera – vocals
- Akira Takasaki – guitars
- Masayoshi Yamashita – bass
- Munetaka Higuchi – drums

Additional musicians

- Kosuke Oshima – keyboards

Production

- Bill Freesh – engineer, mixing
- Isao Kikuchi – mastering
- Jeff Sato – supervisor
