= Breaking the Taboo (album) =

Studio album by Loudness
- Released: December 27, 2006
- Recorded: Studio Birdman West, Tokyo, Japan
- Genres: Heavy metal, speed metal
- Length: 56:49
- Language: Japanese / English
- Label: Tokuma Japan
- Producers: Loudness, Kiyomasa Shinoki, Michiko Fujita, Shun Ooki

Loudness chronology
Racing (2004)	Breaking the Taboo (2006)	Metal Mad (2008)

Breaking the Taboo is the twentieth studio album by Japanese heavy metal band Loudness. Recording started on November 27, 2006, following the group's Thanks 25th Anniversary Loudness Liveshocks 2006 concert at the Tokyo International Forum, and the album was released that December.

== Track listing ==
Music by Akira Takasaki, lyrics by Minoru Niihara

1. "Breaking the Taboo" - 4:28
2. "Brutal Torture" - 4:54
3. "Sick World" - 4:52
4. "Don't Spam Me" - 3:56
5. "Damnation" - 5:19
6. "The Love of My Life" - 4:32
7. "A Moment of Revelation" - 5:34
8. "Dynamite" - 4:49
9. "Risk Taker" - 4:16
10. "I Wish" - 5:51
11. "Diving into Darkness" - 4:13
12. "Without You" - 4:05

== Personnel ==
Loudness

- Minoru Niihara - vocals
- Akira Takasaki - guitars
- Masayoshi Yamashita - bass
- Munetaka Higuchi - drums

Production

- Masayuki Nomura - engineer, mixing
- Shin Takakuwa, Takayuki Ichikawa - engineers
- Takaaki Abiko - mixing assistant
- Fumiaki Nochi - mastering
- Hirose Shiraishi, Shinji Hamasaki - supervisors
- Kiyomasa Shinoki, Michiko Fujita, Shun Ooki - executive producers
