= Loudness Live 2002 =

Live album by Loudness
- Released: May 21, 2003
- Recorded: Shibuya Kokaido, Tokyo, October 25, 2002, Shinjuku Koseinenkin Kaikan, Tokyo, December 31, 2002 (tracks 2.4, 2.5)
- Genre: Heavy metal
- Length: 79:58
- Language: Japanese / English
- Label: Tokuma Japan
- Producer: Loudness, Junji Tada

Loudness chronology
Biosphere (2002)	Loudness Live 2002 (2003)	Terror (2004)

Loudness Live 2002 is the seventh live album by the Japanese heavy metal band Loudness. It was recorded in 2002 and released in 2003 as a double multimedia CD.

== Track listing ==
Disc one

1. "Biosphere" – 3:59
2. "Hellrider" – 5:33
3. "Loudness" – 5:50
4. "Sexy Woman" – 5:36
5. "Ares' Lament" – 6:04
6. "Wind from Tibet" – 5:09
7. "Slaughter House" – 3:50
8. "The End of Earth" – 4:59
9. "Stay Wild" – 6:22
10. "Crazy Night" – 8:31

Disc two

1. "Crazy Doctor" – 4:34
2. "In the Mirror" – 3:49
3. "S.D.I." – 5:50
4. "What's the Truth?" – 5:05
5. "The Pandemonium" – 4:47
- Biosphere (live video at Shinjuku Loft, Tokyo, December 19, 2002)
- Heavy Chains (live video at Club Citta Kawasaki, Tokyo, March 24, 2002)
- Speed (live video at Club Citta Kawasaki, Tokyo, March 24, 2002)

== Personnel ==
Loudness

- Minoru Niihara - vocals
- Akira Takasaki - guitars
- Masayoshi Yamashita - bass
- Munetaka Higuchi - drums

Production

- Masatoshi Sakimoto - engineer, mixing
- Nobuko Shimura - assistant engineer
- Yoichi Aikawa - mastering
- Yukichi Kawaguchi, Nobuou Naka - supervisors
- Junji Tada - executive producer
