= RockShocks =

Rockshocks

Compilation album by Loudness
- Released: September 27, 2004
- Recorded: Paradise Studio, Tokyo, Japan
- Genre: Heavy metal
- Length: 63:13
- Language: Japanese / English
- Label: Tokuma Japan; Crash Music (US)
- Producer: Loudness, Junji Tada

Loudness chronology
Terror (2004)	Rockshocks (2004)	Racing (2004)

US version cover

Professional ratings
Review scores
Source	Rating
Maximum Metal	(favourable)

Rockshocks is an album of self-covers by the Japanese heavy metal band Loudness. The album, released in Japan in 2004, contains tracks taken from the first five studio album of the band from the 1980s, played again with a more modern sound and different musical arrangements than the originals. The album was published in the USA in 2006 by Crash Records, with three bonus tracks taken from the album Racing: "Exultation", "Lunatic" and "R.I.P.".

== Track listing ==
All music by Akira Takasaki, all lyrics by Minoru Niihara

1. "Loudness" - 5:05
2. "Crazy Doctor" - 4:21
3. "In the Mirror" - 3:41
4. "Crazy Night" - 4:33
5. "Esper" - 3:50
6. "Like Hell" - 4:00
7. "Lonely Player" - 5:53
8. "Street Woman" - 5:40
9. "Angel Dust" - 4:32
10. "Rock Shock" - 4:47
11. "The Lines Are Down" - 5:02
12. "Milky Way" - 4:27
13. "Mr. Yesman" - 7:22

== Personnel ==
Loudness

- Minoru Niihara - vocals
- Akira Takasaki - guitars
- Masayoshi Yamashita - bass
- Munetaka Higuchi - drums

Production

- Masatoshi Sakimoto - engineer, mixing
- Yuki Mitome, Keiko Koizumi - assistant engineers
- Yoichi Aikawa - mastering
- Norikazu Shimano, Shinji Hamasaki - supervisors
- Junji Tada - executive producer
