= Give Lee Give Lee Rock Lee =

Single by Animetal USA × Hironobu Kageyama

from the album Animetal USA W
- Released: April 25, 2012
- Recorded: 2012
- Genre: Anison; heavy metal
- Length: 4:19
- Label: SME Records
- Songwriter(s): mindsalt; Marty Friedman; Chris Impellitteri
- Producer(s): Marty Friedman

"Give Lee Give Lee Rock Lee" ("Give Lee Give Lee ロック・リー", Gibu Rī Gibu Rī Rokku Rī) is a single by Japan-based American metal band Animetal USA and Japanese anison singer Hironobu Kageyama. The song serves as the theme song for the Naruto spin-off Rock Lee & His Ninja Pals.

The single peaked at No. 179 on the Oricon's weekly singles chart.

== Track listing ==
All lyrics are written by mindsalt; all music is composed by Marty Friedman

No.	Title	Length
1.	"Give Lee Give Lee Rock Lee" (Gibu Rī Gibu Rī Rokku Rī ("Give Lee Give Lee ロック・リー"))	4:19
2.	"Give Lee Give Lee Rock Lee" (Animetal USA Version)	4:25
3.	"Give Lee Give Lee Rock Lee" (TV Size Version)	1:34
4.	"Give Lee Give Lee Rock Lee" (Karaoke)	4:17
Total length:		14:36

== Charts ==
Chart (2012)	Peak position
Japanese Oricon Singles Chart	179
