= Terror (album) =

Studio album by Loudness
- Released: January 7, 2004
- Studio: Paradise Studio, Tokyo, Japan
- Genre: Doom metal
- Length: 60:52
- Language: Japanese / English
- Label: Tokuma Japan
- Producer: Loudness, Yukichi Kawaguchi, Junji Tada

Loudness chronology
Loudness Live 2002 (2003)	Terror (2004)	RockShocks (2004)

Terror (剥離, Hakuri) is the eighteenth studio album by the Japanese heavy metal band Loudness. It was released only in Japan, in January 2004. The album is one of the heaviest released by the band, and was created with a theme of horror and terror. This theme is also reflected in the album artwork. The band display influences from Black Sabbath, and the album overall has a doom metal type sound.

== Track listing ==
All songs written by Loudness

1. "Pharaoh" - 7:08
2. "Cyber Soul" - 5:35
3. "Life After Death" - 5:02
4. "Let's Free Our Souls" - 4:37
5. "Detonator (Fire and Thunder)" - 3:09
6. "Cross" - 8:49
7. "About to Kill" - 4:46
8. "Double-Walker" - 6:36
9. "City of Vampire" - 5:57
10. "Seventh Heaven" - 4:30
11. "Terror" - 4:46

== Personnel ==
Loudness

- Minoru Niihara - vocals
- Akira Takasaki - guitars
- Masayoshi Yamashita - bass
- Munetaka Higuchi - drums

Production

- Masatoshi Sakimoto - engineer, mixing
- Yuki Mitome - assistant engineer
- Yoichi Aikawa - mastering
- Norikazu Shimano, Shinji Hamasaki - supervisors
- Yukichi Kawaguchi, Junji Tada - executive producers
