= Crazy Night =

Single by Loudness

from the album Thunder in the East
- Language: English
- B-side: "No Way Out"
- Released: December 1, 1984 (Japan); November 1, 1985 (U.S.)
- Recorded: 1984
- Studio: Sound City Studios, Los Angeles, CA, U.S.
- Genre: Heavy metal; glam metal
- Length: 4:04
- Label: Nippon Columbia (Japan); ATCO (U.S.)
- Composer: Akira Takasaki
- Lyricist: Minoru Niihara
- Producer: Max Norman

Loudness singles chronology
"Road Racer" (1983)	"Crazy Night" (1984)	"Gotta Fight" (1985)

"Crazy Night" (クレイジーナイト, Kureijī Naito) (also known as "Crazy Nights") is the fourth single by Japanese heavy metal band Loudness, from their 1985 album Thunder in the East. Written by lead vocalist Minoru Niihara and guitarist Akira Takasaki and produced by Max Norman, the single was released by Nippon Columbia on December 1, 1984, in Japan and by Atco Records on November 1, 1985. The song was the band's big break in the American metal scene and has since become their signature song.

The chant of "M-Z-A!" featured in the song came about when Norman asked Niihara to come up with something to sing over the main riff between the chorus and next verse. "M-Z-A!" means nothing, and it was intended to be replaced with another line in post-production. When Niihara couldn't come up with anything to replace it, the "M-Z-A!" chant survived.

Loudness has re-recorded the song in their self-cover albums RockShocks (2004) and Samsara Flight (2016).

== Track listing ==
All lyrics are written by Minoru Niihara; all music is composed by Akira Takasaki.

No.	Title	Length
1.	"Crazy Night"	4:04
2.	"No Way Out"	4:01

== Personnel ==
- Minoru Niihara – vocals
- Akira Takasaki – guitars
- Masayoshi Yamashita – bass
- Munetaka Higuchi – drums

== Cover versions ==
- Therion covered the song on their 1999 album Crowning of Atlantis.
- HammerFall covered the song as a bonus track on the Japan release of their 2002 album Crimson Thunder.
- Children of Bodom covered the song as a Japanese edition bonus track on their 2013 album Halo of Blood.

== See also ==
- 1984 in Japanese music
