= Biosphere (album) =

Studio album by Loudness
- Released: September 4, 2002
- Studio: Little Bach Kobuchizawa and Freedom Studio, Tokyo, Japan
- Genre: Groove metal, nu metal, speed metal
- Length: 57:13
- Language: Japanese / English
- Label: Tokuma Japan
- Producer: Loudness, Noricazu Shimano

Loudness chronology
Pandemonium (2001)	Biosphere (2002)	Loudness Live 2002 (2003)

Professional ratings
Review scores
Source	Rating
Maximum Metal	(very favourable)

Biosphere (新世界, Shin sekai) is the seventeenth studio album by the Japanese metal band Loudness. It was released only in Japan, in 2002.

== Track listing ==
All lyrics by Minoru Niihara, music as indicated.

1. "Hellrider" (Akira Takasaki & Loudness) - 5:30
2. "Biosphere" (Masayoshi Yamashita & Loudness) - 3:52
3. "Savior" (Yamashita & Loudness) - 3:44
4. "My Precious" (Takasaki & Loudness) - 5:08
5. "Wind from Tibet" (Yamashita & Loudness) - 5:39
6. "System Crush" (Yamashita & Loudness) - 4:23
7. "The Night Is Still Young" (Takasaki & Loudness) - 4:37
8. "Shame on You" (Yamashita & Loudness) - 5:53
9. "Break My Mind" (Munetaka Higuchi & Loudness) - 4:30
10. "So Beautiful" (Yamashita & Loudness) - 4:53
11. "For You" (Niihara & Loudness) - 6:53

== Personnel ==
Loudness

- Minoru Niihara - vocals
- Akira Takasaki - guitars
- Masayoshi Yamashita - bass
- Munetaka Higuchi - drums

Production

- Masatoshi Sakimoto - engineer, mixing
- Kazumi Tokue, Nobuko Shimura, Tadashi Hashimoto - assistant engineers
- Yoichi Aikawa - mastering
- Nobuo Naka, Yukichi Kawaguchi - supervisors
- Noricazu Shimano - executive producer
