= A Cruel Angel's Thesis =

Theme song of Neon Genesis Evangelion

- Original anime edition cover of "Zankoku na tenshi no tēze"/"Fly Me to the Moon"

Single by Yōko Takahashi

from the album Neon Genesis Evangelion
- Language: Japanese
- A-side: "Fly Me to the Moon"
- B-side: "Tsuki no Meikyū"
- Released: October 25, 1995
- Recorded: August 4, 1995
- Genre: J-pop
- Length: 4:05
- Label: Starchild
- Composer: Hidetoshi Satō
- Lyricist: Neko Oikawa
- Producer: Toshiyuki Ōmori

Yōko Takahashi singles chronology
"Moonlight Epicurian" (1994)	"A Cruel Angel's Thesis" (1995)	"Meguriai" (1996)

Music videos
- "The Cruel Angel's Thesis" on YouTube

"A Cruel Angel's Thesis" (Note: The official music video translates the title with the article "The", while the use of "A" is common among both Japanese and English publications.) (残酷な天使のテーゼ, Zankoku na Tenshi no Tēze) is a J-pop song performed by Japanese singer Yōko Takahashi and the opening theme of the anime television series Neon Genesis Evangelion. The song was composed by Toshiyuki Ōmori and Hidetoshi Satō, with its lyrics written by Neko Oikawa. It was released as a double-A-side single with "Fly Me to the Moon", the show's closing theme, on October 25, 1995. "The Cruel Angel's Thesis" was also included in the series' soundtrack releases and Takahashi's albums.

The song received acclaim from music critics and audiences alike; it later became a well-known Japanese anisong, a song specially created for an anime series. Years after the show's first airing, "The Cruel Angel's Thesis" has remained a popular Japanese karaoke song, winning popularity polls and awards. On the Internet, along with its official video, the song gained further fame through covers and parodies, becoming one of the most famous theme songs in the history of anime.

== Background and recording ==
Opening and theme song for the TV series.
Cruel Angel's Thesis
"Cruel Angel's Thesis" as sung by Yoko Takahashi.

Neon Genesis Evangelion anime series director Hideaki Anno initially suggested using an existing piece of classical music as the series' opening theme. He planned to use the Polovtsian Dances from the opera Prince Igor by Russian composer Aleksander Borodin. TV Tokyo expressed concern that classical music as an opening theme would be "unclear" for the start of a television anime, and the production ultimately did not use the piece. Shirō Sagisu composed the series' original soundtrack, while Hidetoshi Satō composed the theme song and Toshiyuki Ōmori arranged it. Toshimichi Ōtsuki, a member of King Records and the official producer of the animated series, coordinated the song, although his name does not appear in the film's credits. During the demo stage, Ōtsuki requested that the "streaming melody" change into a "crispy notching style".

Singer Yōko Takahashi recorded "A Cruel Angel's Thesis" without knowing anything about the anime, its story, or its imagery. After Ōmori had roughly finished the arrangement, Takahashi recorded a temporary track by singing the melody using only the syllable "la". Once the final lyrics were ready, the production staff asked Takahashi, then almost thirty years old, to adopt a teenage tone of voice. When she received a demo with a tentative synthesizer melody, she found both the song and its lyrics difficult and considered its fast tempo particularly challenging. She later identified "A Cruel Angel's Thesis" as the most challenging song of her career to perform. Anno also requested the removal of a planned male backing choir to emphasize "maternal affection" in the opening theme.

== Composition and lyrics ==
Neko Oikawa wrote the lyrics under Ōtsuki's instructions to make them "philosophical" and "difficult". She conceived the key concepts of "mother", "fourteen-year-old boys and girls", and "an older woman". After listening to a demo tape on which Takahashi had recorded the melody, Oikawa completed the lyrics in two hours. She received a project proposal and videos of the first two, still-incomplete episodes, but skimmed the proposal and watched the videos in fast-forward. Oikawa wrote from the perspective of a mother wishing that her boy would not grow up, making use of rhetoric and double meanings. The song begins with the voice of a woman who advises a young man to behave like an angel without mercy, encouraging him with the cry of shinwa ni nare (神話になれ; lit. "become a myth"). For the woman, the boy is still innocent and naïve; he looks at her, smiles, and says nothing, and she gently invites him to rest. Reassuring him that fate brought them together, she says: "On your back you have feathers that will carry you into the future".

For the title, Oikawa used the German word These (テーゼ; lit. "thesis"). Yahoo! Japan noted that the concept of These appears, among others, in the philosophy of German idealist Georg Wilhelm Friedrich Hegel. Oikawa also took inspiration from Moto Hagio's then-ongoing manga A Cruel God Reigns (残酷な神が支配する, Zankoku na kami ga shihai suru), and inserted the term tenshi (天使), which usually refers to the angels of Christianity. The lyrics also include the verse "Watashi wa sō jiyū o shiru tame no baiburu" (私はそう自由を知るためのバイブル) ("This is the Bible with which you will learn what freedom is"). Oikawa initially considered the imperative "kyōki ni nare" (凶器になれ; lit. 'become a weapon') for the lyrics, but the production staff told her that it sounded like kyōki (狂気; lit. "madness") and that television standards did not allow the expression. They asked her to replace it with "shinwa ni nare" (神話になれ; lit. "become a myth"), already present in the second verse. Oikawa retained an imperative ending because she found it satisfying to sing and suitable for conveying an older person's perspective. The song's interlude also contains the chorus fariyā setameso, fariyā tusē (ファリヤー セタメソー ファリヤー トゥセー), which Oikawa did not write. Ōmori, Takahashi, and her brother Gō Takahashi performed the chorus. In 2022, Oikawa asked arranger Toshiyuki Ōmori about the words; according to Ōmori, they have no particular meaning and "suddenly came down from the universe".

Critics have classified "A Cruel Angel's Thesis" as a J-pop song. Writer Dennis Redmond, in particular, argued that the theme avoids many conventions of Japanese anime opening songs, noting that it "begins and ends in a minor key and avoids clichéd choruses". Anime scholar Susan J. Napier argued that "A Cruel Angel's Thesis" reinforces the initial impression of Evangelion as a conventional mecha series through its upbeat tone and its exhortation to an unnamed youth to "become a legend"; according to Napier, the anime subsequently overturns those genre conventions, revealing a far darker and more unsettling work. According to writer Katherine Savoy, the song carries many of the important themes that appear in the series, focusing on innocence and inevitability; the lyrics play with the term destiny, "showing the struggle between what the boy is searching for and what is expected to come of him". According to Comic Book Resources' Devin Meenan, the lyrics could refer to Yui Ikari, protagonist Shinji's mother, or Misato Katsuragi, his superior who encourages him "to come out of his shell". Kotono Mitsuishi, Misato's Japanese voice actress, gave a similar interpretation, saying that when she listened to "The Cruel Angel's Thesis" again, the lyric "I will go on living without ever becoming a goddess" (女神なんてなれないまま私は生きる, Megami nante narenai mama watashi wa ikiru) "pierced [her] heart"; she wondered whether it was "truly the voice of Misato's heart".

== Release ==
"The Cruel Angel's Thesis" debuted as a single in two versions on October 25, 1995. The first, priced at ¥1,049, included another song by Takahashi, "Tsuki no meikyū" (月の迷宮; lit. "Moon's Labyrinth"); the second, priced at ¥944, paired it with Claire Littley's rendition of "Fly Me to the Moon", the series' ending theme. A reissue of the second version followed on March 26, 2003, alongside the Renewal Edition of Neon Genesis Evangelion. The song also appeared on the anime's soundtrack albums, beginning with Neon Genesis Evangelion I on December 6, 1995. Neon Genesis Evangelion II followed on February 16, 1996, and included the shorter "TV Size Version" heard in the TV Tokyo broadcast.

The song also appeared on other releases, such as the special box set The Day of Second Impact (September 13, 2000), Neon Genesis Evangelion: S² Works (December 4, 1998), Refrain of Evangelion (July 24, 2003), Neon Genesis Evangelion Decade (October 26, 2005), AT EVA01 Reference CD (December 21, 2007), Shin Godzilla vs Evangelion Symphony (December 27, 2017), Evangelion Finally (October 7, 2020), and Neon Genesis Evangelion Soundtrack 25th Anniversary Box, which contains multiple versions of the theme song. The track also appeared on unrelated compilations, such as the Star Child Selection (28 January 2000), various Super Robot Tamashii anthologies in various mixes, pop'n music 12 Iroha AC CS pop'n music 10 (13 April 2005), Brass Band Koushien 3 (June 24, 2009), and Nekoism 〜 Neko Oikawa Sakuhin-shū (February 21, 2018). In 2026, Dolby Atmos spatial audio mixes of "A Cruel Angel's Thesis" and "Soul's Refrain" were released on Apple Music, following a proposal by Takahashi. For the Evangelion franchise's thirtieth anniversary, Takahashi also released "A Cruel Angel's Thesis" Evangelion 30th Anniversary Edition LP on February 21, 2026.

== Reception ==
According to Yahoo!, "The Cruel Angel's Thesis", despite having been released in 1995, continued to rank highly in anime-song rankings conducted by various media and remained popular across a wide range of generations. The release of the Rebuild of Evangelion theatrical films also renewed its popularity. In 1996 and 1997, after the first broadcast of Neon Genesis Evangelion, the Animage Anime Grand Prix named "The Cruel Angel's Thesis" its best song for two consecutive years; in the second year, it received more than twice as many votes as runner-up Give a Reason by Megumi Hayashibara. In a 2002 TV Asahi poll of the 100 most unforgettable anime songs, "The Cruel Angel's Thesis" placed 55th. It later placed 18th in another TV Asahi ranking of anime songs from the 1990s onward. In 2016, Anime News Network users ranked the song first among their favorite anisongs of the 1990s, while a CD & DL Data survey of 6,956 respondents aged 10 to 39 also ranked it first among their favorite anime songs. In 2018, 110 respondents to an Anime! Anime! poll ranked "The Cruel Angel's Thesis" third among anime songs they would choose as Japan's national anthem. The following year, it placed second in a Merumo survey of female respondents' favorite anime songs to sing.

=== Critical reception ===
Critics positively received "The Cruel Angel's Thesis". Casey Baseel of Sora News and Ederlyn Peralta of Comic Book Resources described it as an unforgettable track and one of the most iconic anime songs. Comic Book Resources' Eduardo Luquin praised its tone, writing: " 'Cruel Angel's Thesis' is a hype train that starts the trippy trip to the destinations known as philosophy, religion, and teenage angst. Like a starting shot at the start of the race, it implores the watcher to go headlong into the show and try to take in everything Evangelion has to offer." Anime News Network reviewer Martin Theron described it as "one of the all-time great anime series openers". Matt Fagaly of Crunchyroll and Tom Pinchuk of Geek & Sundry contrasted the series' dark themes with the opening song's more uplifting character. Following the anime's release on Netflix, David Levesley of Gentlemen's Quarterly called the theme "exceptional", while Junichi Tsukagoshi of Animate Times called it "a great song that everyone knows". Comic Book Resources ranked "A Cruel Angel's Thesis" first among anime openings of the 1990s and third among anime opening themes overall.

=== Legacy ===
SoraNews24 described "The Cruel Angel's Thesis" as an "unqualified hit" that transcended anime fandom, while Crunchyroll's Kara Dennison called it "one of the most recognizable [themes] in anime history". According to Polygon writer Francesco Cacciatore, the song helped Neon Genesis Evangelion to "become a beachhead for anime on the shores of mainstream popular culture". Throughout the years, the song spawned memes and parody edits. MAD videos parodying or recreating the opening sequence also circulated online; according to Comic Book Resources's Angelo Delos Trinos, it has been "endlessly covered and edited more so than anything from the actual anime. Even anime newcomers who have yet to watch anything from Evangelion are already familiar with its opening because of its undying online presence". Internet users also produced edit videos, mash-ups, and covers of the song. In 2018, a Twitter user combined the song with a video clip of LMFAO's "Party Rock Anthem", inspiring further variations on social media. In 2022 Japanese voice actress and singer Aina Aiba named "The Cruel Angel's Thesis" as an anime song that changed her life, saying that performing it on the electone as a child helped inspire her to enter the entertainment industry. Voice actress Sally Amaki said that Takahashi and other prominent 1990s anime performers helped popularize anime in Japan, adding that Takahashi "really paved the way" for later performers and "fired up the 'ani-song' community".

==== Merchandise and other uses ====
Fields used the 2009 version of "A Cruel Angel's Thesis" as an image song for its pachinko game CR Shin Seiki Evangelion: Saigo no Shisha (CR新世紀エヴァンゲリオン ～最後のシ者～). In August 1997, the Japanese magazine June, which specialized in shonen-ai manga and anime, published an issue entitled Zankoku na tenshi no yō ni (残酷な天使のように; lit. 'Like a cruel angel'), taking its title from the theme song's opening line. In 2014, Sony released a special Walkman modeled after Shinji's music player; when purchased at Sony Stores in Ginza, Nagoya, or Osaka, the set included a Mora card for downloading "The Cruel Angel's Thesis". The following year, a musical road playing the song opened on the Ashinoko Skyline in Hakone, the area in which the series' fictional city of Tokyo-3 is located. Small grooves in the road surface produced the melody through friction with vehicles' tires, with 40 km/h (25 mph) indicated as the optimal driving speed. The 500 Type Eva, a 500 Series Shinkansen train themed after the series, used a version of "A Cruel Angel's Thesis" as the chime preceding station announcements.

In 2018, Evastore, an official store entirely dedicated to the series, promoted a remastered release of the single and produced related merchandise, such as T-shirts, a tapestry, and a metallic postcard and clear-file set. The song also appeared in an official crossover episode between Neon Genesis Evangelion and the animated series Shinkansen Henkei Robo Shinkalion. On December 26, Takahashi appeared at a special event held at an izakaya themed after the series. The menu also included a drink named "Zankoku na tenshi no these". In the same year, "The Cruel Angel's Thesis" was used in the opening of The Nagano Tapes, an Olympic Channel documentary on the Czech hockey team at the 1998 Winter Olympics in Nagano, Japan; the sequence itself paid homage to the opening of Neon Genesis Evangelion. Director Ondřej Hudeček stated that he had originally been introduced to the series at around the same time as the Nagano Olympics, and that he chose to use "The Cruel Angel's Thesis" and an Evangelion-themed opening because he wanted to incorporate references synonymous with his experiences of the late-1990s. In 2019, Japanese singer Toshi performed the song during a performance of the ice-skating show Fantasy on Ice. American wrestler Dio Maddin named one of his final moves "Cruel Angel's Thesis" after the song. In 2020, the Tokyo Skytree hosted an Evangelion-themed event that screened a version of "The Cruel Angel's Thesis" featuring footage of a live performance by Takahashi at its observatory; the event continued until May 31, 2021. "The Cruel Angel's Thesis" was also used in an episode of Seiyu's Life! and the opening sequence inspired parodies in other animated series, such as Hayate the Combat Butler and Regular Show.

== Commercial performance ==
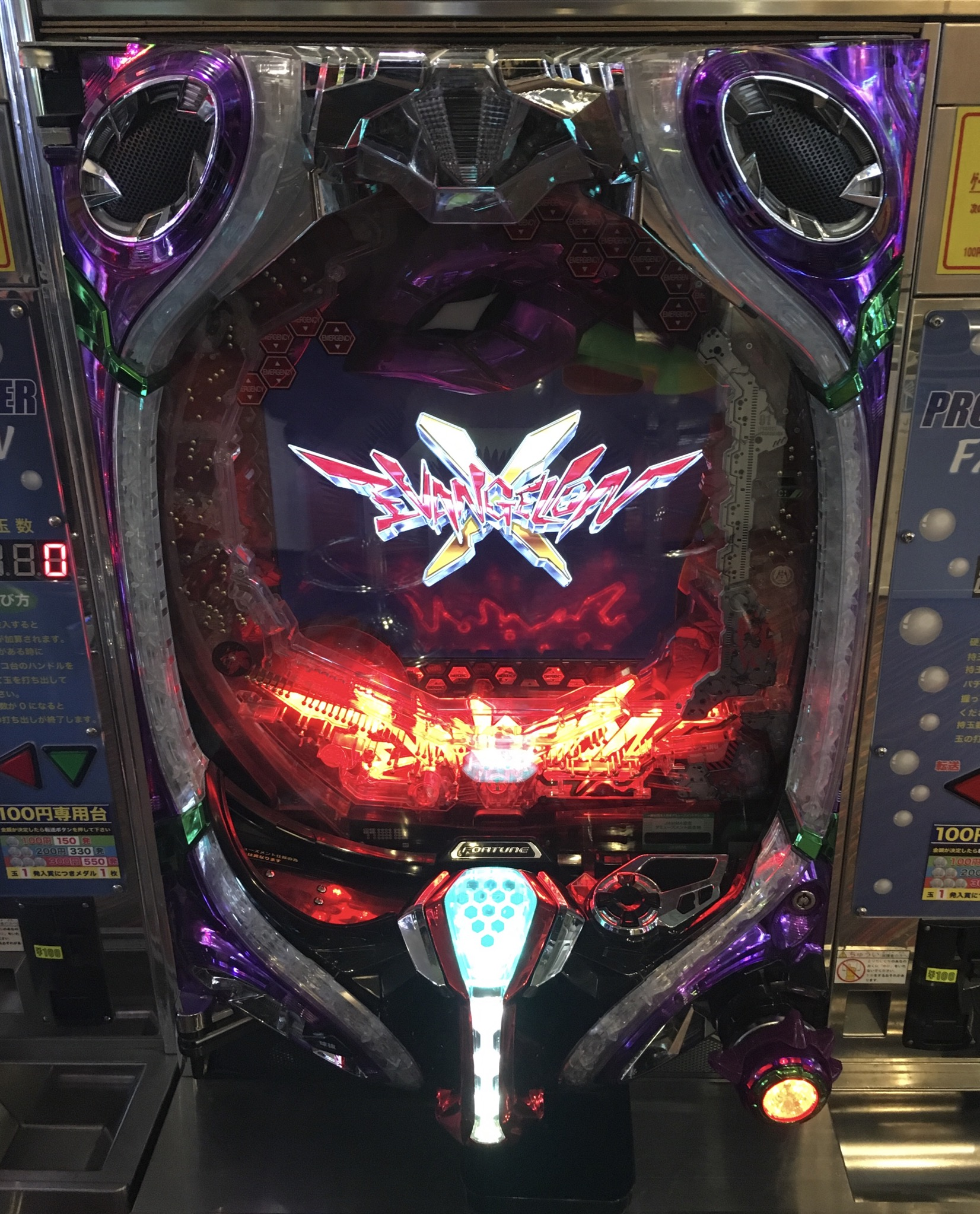
Oikawa said that "A Cruel Angel's Thesis" generated approximately ¥100 million in royalties per year through karaoke performances and its use in pachinko parlors.

"A Cruel Angel's Thesis" appeared in Oricon's annual karaoke rankings in 2013, 2014, 2015, 2016, 2017, 2018, and 2019. The original version of the song was released as a single on October 25, 1995, and spent twenty-two weeks on Oricon's weekly singles chart, peaking at number twenty-seven. A second version, released on the same day and also featuring Claire's cover of "Fly Me to the Moon", peaked at number seventeen and spent sixty-one weeks on the chart. In 1997, shortly after the end of the anime's first airing and the release of the movie Neon Genesis Evangelion: Death & Rebirth, "A Cruel Angel's Thesis" was certified Gold. The 2003 version stayed on the chart for nine weeks, peaking at number forty-one. In the June and July 2009 issues of Newtype, "A Cruel Angel's Thesis" ranked first in Joysound's anisong karaoke rankings, based on data from March and April, respectively. The 2009 version also spent fourteen weeks on the Oricon singles chart and peaked at number twenty-two. According to Mainichi Shimbun, the single had shipped one million copies by 2007. In 2014, the song also received a Million certification from the RIAJ for digital downloads.

In 2011, more than fifteen years after its debut, the Japanese Society for Rights of Authors, Composers and Publishers gave "A Cruel Angel's Thesis" its Gold Award at the JASRAC Awards, which recognize the domestic works with the highest royalty distributions during the previous fiscal year. The song had ranked among JASRAC's top domestic works in previous years, placing seventh in 2008 and eighth in 2009. In 2010, it placed third and received the Bronze Award. In May 2012, "A Cruel Angel's Thesis" was certified three-times platinum by the Recording Industry Association of Japan. The song also generated substantial royalties for lyricist Neko Oikawa through karaoke and pachinko; in 2015, she said that it earned her roughly ¥100 million annually.

In 2013, "A Cruel Angel's Thesis" placed third in a Koebu.com poll of voice actors' favorite karaoke songs. It had also appeared in karaoke usage rankings, placing twentieth in 2007, second in 2009, and sixth during the week of June 3–9, 2013. In the first half of 2014, it ranked first in Joysound's anime, tokusatsu, and game karaoke ranking. In 2015, it placed first in a Charapedia poll of about 10,000 fans asked to name their favorite anime song to sing at karaoke. In March of that year, a Nico Nico News survey asked more than 300 adults which anime songs they were tired of hearing at karaoke; "A Cruel Angel's Thesis" placed first with 40.6% of the vote. The song continued to appear in karaoke polls and rankings in 2017, 2019, and 2020. On February 18, 2017, NHK BS Premium broadcast a live program entitled "Countdown Live Anisong Best 100!", which ranked the song eighth. In 2019, Joysound named it the most popular karaoke song of the Heisei era. In the first half of 2020, Joysound also ranked it second among anime songs, behind LiSA's "Gurenge". In May 2026, "A Cruel Angel's Thesis" reached the milestone of one thousand weeks in the top fifty of the Oricon Weekly Karaoke Ranking, becoming the fourth song in Oricon history to do so. The song also spent a record 745 weeks in the top ten. In March of the same year, it also surpassed 100 million cumulative streams on the Oricon Weekly Streaming Ranking.

== Music video ==
=== Development and release ===
For "The Cruel Angel's Thesis", a ninety-second opening video was created, with Takeshi Honda and Shinya Hasegawa handling key animation. The opening sequence was not yet ready when the first two episodes were screened at the second Gainax Festival, three months before their television broadcast. The music video was completed in September of the same year, shortly before the anime premiered on TV Tokyo. The video consists of approximately 2,160 frames divided into eighty-four scenes, or roughly one scene per second. Hideaki Anno's name appears in large letters in the video's last few seconds before Eva-01's arms appear to cut through it. Gainax's Hiroki Satō noted that no anime released since then had displayed a name as prominently as the words "Hideaki Anno, Director" in Evangelion's opening credits. A second video for the song's full version was released with the 2003 home video edition of the series, Renewal of Evangelion. Animator and Evangelion assistant director Masayuki directed the video. The full video is different from the one for the television broadcast and includes images from the director's cut of the episodes and scenes from the film The End of Evangelion (1997). It also includes captions with white characters on a black background, written and coordinated by Hideaki Anno. In 2018, Masayuki re-edited and readjusted the 2003 music video using HD footage from the series; King Records released the resulting version on its official YouTube channel on June 20. According to writer Virginie Nebbia, Anno drew inspiration for the "A Cruel Angel's Thesis" video from the opening credits of the series UFO, the Japanese series Key Hunter, and the directional style of Akio Jissōji, particularly the frenetic editing of Jissōji's introduction to the film Ultraman (1979), which re-edited episodes he had directed in 1966.

=== Synopsis and cultural references ===
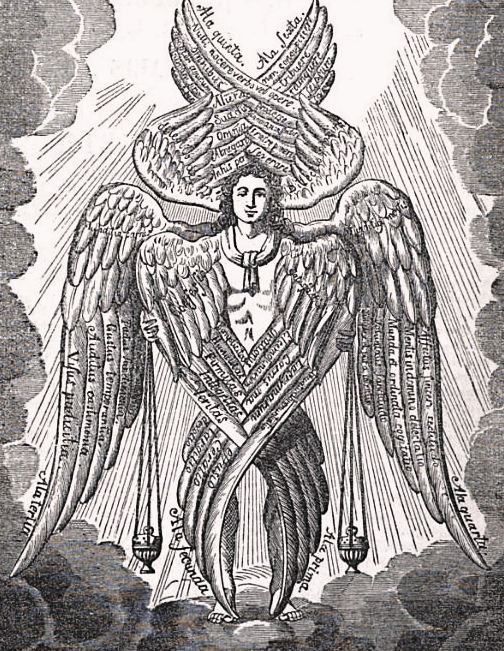
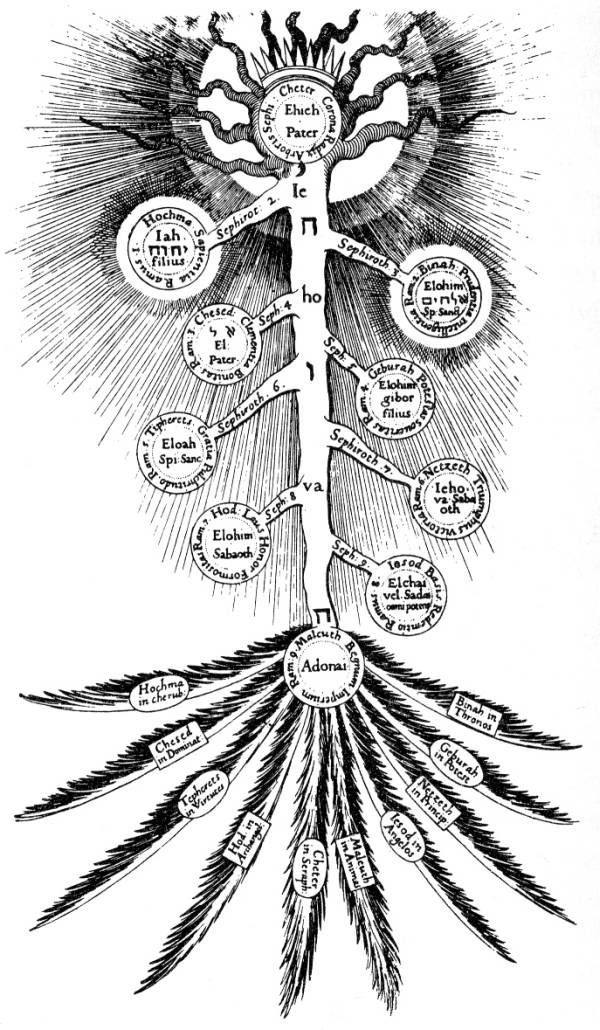
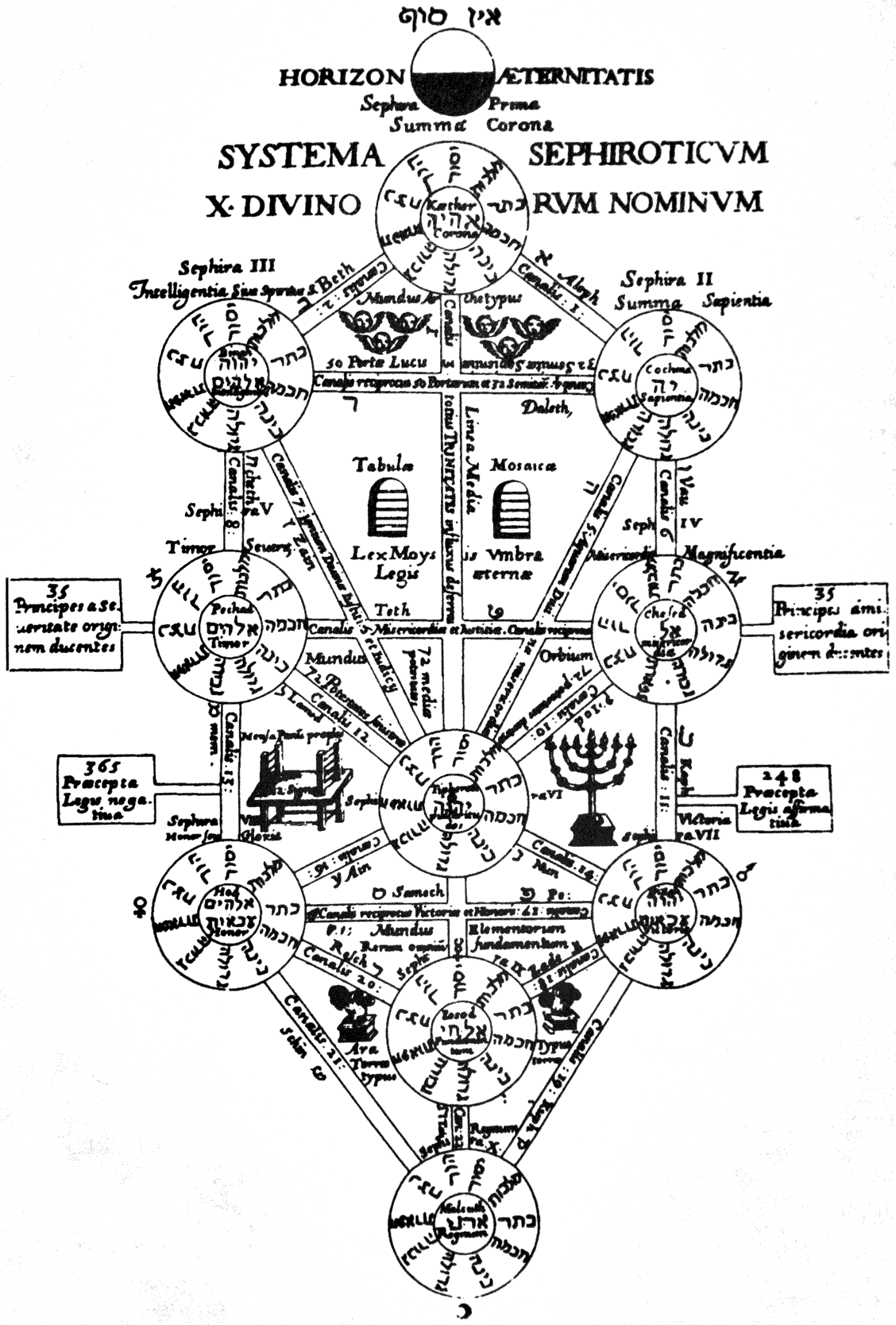
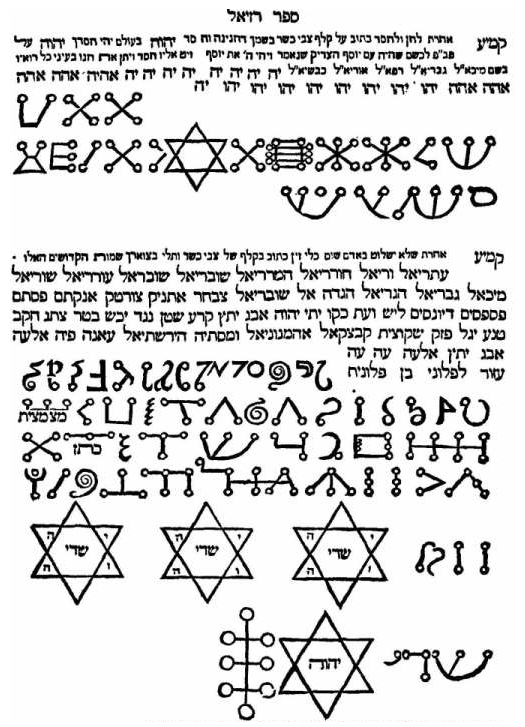
The official video contains, in order of appearance, the image of a cherub and two trees of life: the first is taken from Utriusque Cosmi, maiores scilicet et minores, metaphysica, physica atque technica Historia by Robert Fludd, the second from Oedipus Aegyptiacus by Athanasius Kircher. The last frame instead depicts a text similar to the Liber Razielis Archangeli

The video of the television version of "A Cruel Angel's Thesis" contains several religious references, particularly to Christianity and Judaism. In the opening frames, a bright blue dot appears and expands like a drop of water surrounded by a circle of the same color. According to the storyboard, the creation of the universe begins from the point of light. According to critic Mario Pasqualini, the symbol could refer to the relationship between God and Creation, which numerous authors have compared to that between a center and a circle. After the point of light, a figure with twelve wings on a red background, similar to some representations of cherubim, appears. This is followed by a blue light, which is associated with the concept of the soul and plays an important role in the series. The image also depicts the external world as seen by a fetus in the maternal womb. Further religious symbolism includes two depictions of the Kabbalistic Tree of Life by Robert Fludd and Athanasius Kircher, referencing the series' Human Instrumentality Project, a plan for the evolution of humanity pursued by Gendo Ikari. Academic Fabio Bartoli noted that the Tree of Life crosses Misato Katsuragi's body in the video, and interpreted this as suggesting that Misato herself was the guinea pig in Adam's contact experiment that caused the Second Impact in the series. According to writers Sellés and Hernández-Pérez, the ten sephirot represent "types of human behavior"; consequently, the Tree suggests both religion and psychology, "thus bringing together the two main thematic readings of the series". They also compared the Angel with twelve eyes to the traditional depiction of Ezekiel's tetramorph, noting that the figure has "bird-like features" and resembles the Angel Sachiel.

In the latter part, a frame of Rei Ayanami touching a window is glimpsed, with a close-up of her eye as she blinks. Writer Dennis Redmond compared Rei's eye to a similar image used by director Krzysztof Kieślowski in the film Blue (1993). The video alternates images of Eva-01's blood-covered hand and Eva-01 unleashing twelve wings of light with white captions on a black background and vice versa, maps, pencil sketches, a drawing depicting Kaworu Nagisa, a portrait of Misato Katsuragi, Ryōji Kaji and Ritsuko Akagi, the first Angel Adam, and a luminous red sphere. The staff drew inspiration for Eva-01's wings of light from the Christian figure of Lucifer, a fallen angel said to possess twelve wings. The twelve wings also reference Ryō Asuka from Gō Nagai's manga Devilman. The video ends with text written in what the official storyboards call "angelic characters" (天使の文字, tenshi no moji); director Anno explained that it represents the Dead Sea Scrolls. The Evangelion Glossary (エヴァンゲリオン用語事典, Evangerion Yougo Jiten) by Yahata Shoten compared the script to the angelic writing found in existing Kabbalistic texts. Víctor Sellés de Lucas and Manuel Hernández-Pérez similarly noted that the first glyph closely resembles the kanji for heaven (天, ten), which is also the first kanji in angel (天使, tenshi). According to them, this probably alludes to the various angelic languages developed within the occult Western tradition, as the set of glyphs employed resembles the language that Heinrich Cornelius Agrippa included in his De Occulta Philosophia. Neon Genesis Evangelion's manga English editor Carl Gustav Horn also compared the calligraphy of the characters to the Sefer Raziel HaMalakh, a grimoire of Practical Kabbalah. The video also concludes with Shinji smiling beneath a blue sky. According to former Gainax translator Michael House, Anno had originally envisioned a positive change for the characters, but during production came to believe that they were incapable of such an outcome; he nevertheless sought a way to end the series with Shinji smiling.

=== Reception ===
The video clip for "The Cruel Angel's Thesis" received critical praise. According to Neon Genesis Evangelion: The Unofficial Guide, written by Martin Foster and Kazuhisa Fujie, when Evangelion first came out, the opening was considered "unclear", or merely intended to make a visual impact with little or no connection to the logic of the storyline. Many fans who watched the entire series were subsequently surprised to find that "everything that appeared in the story had been highlighted, flagged or hinted at in the opening sequence". Newtype magazine praised the video, calling it "excellent" and appreciating its high density of information. ComicBook.com's Nick Valdez described the video as "one of the coolest trips down memory lane".

== Live performances ==
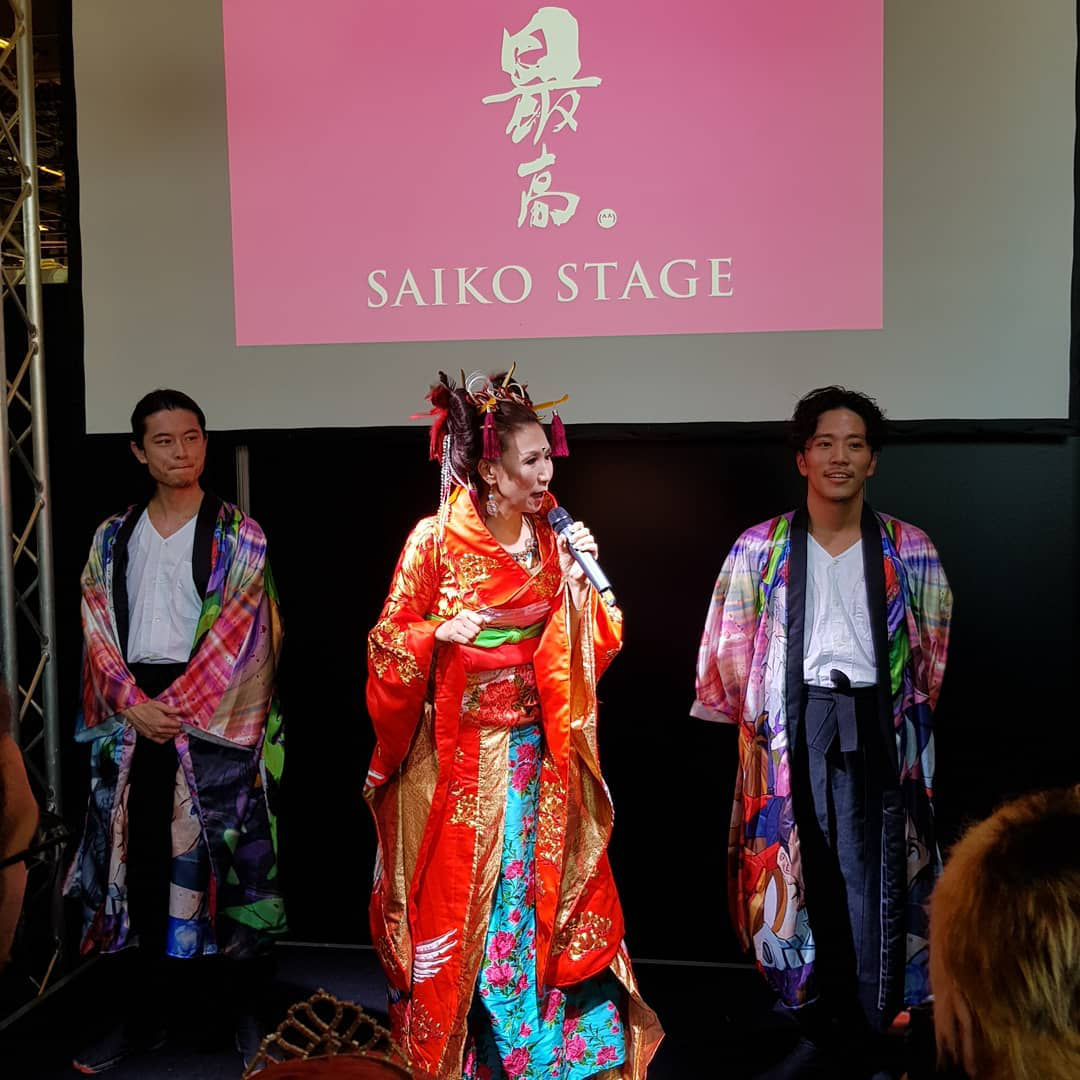
Singer Yōko Takahashi during a live performance at Paris Japan Expo

In 2015, Takahashi sang "The Cruel Angel's Thesis" at the Anime Expo in Los Angeles, California, and in 2017 she sang the song during Billboard Live in Tokyo, receiving a warm reception from the audience. In 2018, the song was included in her Evangelion World Tour, which was organized to promote the re-release of "The Cruel Angel's Thesis" and "Soul's Refrain" using the original audio remastered from analog tapes, and included dates in Japan, France, and Hong Kong. On July 6, 2019, Takahashi appeared at the Japan Expo in Paris, singing songs from the Neon Genesis Evangelion soundtrack just before an official preview of the film Evangelion: 3.0 + 1.0. That year, Neon Genesis Evangelion I, including "Zankoku na tenshi no these", was added to Spotify on June 21. In 2020, an event dedicated to Evangelion's Operation Yashima was announced in Hakone, the area where the show's fictional city Tokyo-3 is located. Takahashi was scheduled to perform "The Cruel Angel's Thesis" live on March 28 and May 23, but the concerts were cancelled due to the COVID-19 pandemic. On October 3 of the same year, Takahashi took part in the opening event for the Evangelion Kyoto Base attraction at Toei Kyoto Studio Park in Ukyō-ku, singing "Zankoku na tenshi no these" on the palm of Eva-01's hand.

On January 18, 2026, Takahashi performed at the Maruhon MakiArt Terrace in Ishinomaki as part of the concert "Yōko Takahashi meets Makoto Kuriya: A Cruel Angel's Jazzy Time", in which anime theme and insert songs, including "A Cruel Angel's Thesis", "Soul's Refrain", and "Fly Me to the Moon", were performed in jazz arrangements by Makoto Kuriya. On February 22, 2026, the singer performed "A Cruel Angel's Thesis" at Yokohama Arena during the celebration of the series' thirtieth anniversary. In April of the same year, Takahashi performed "A Cruel Angel's Thesis" and "Soul's Refrain" during the premiere of the Evangelion-themed night show "Shower of Lights: Harmonics with Evangelion" at Huis Ten Bosch, a theme park in Nagasaki Prefecture, and performed the song again at the 10th Crunchyroll Anime Awards at the Grand Prince Hotel Takanawa on May 23. On September 19, 2026, Canadian singer-songwriter The Weeknd opened the Asian leg of his After Hours til Dawn Tour at Belluna Dome in Saitama, where he debuted an unreleased song sampling "A Cruel Angel's Thesis" with Takahashi. Takahashi subsequently performed "A Cruel Angel's Thesis" on stage.

== Remixes and other versions ==
For "Take Care of Yourself", the anime's last episode, two instrumental arrangements of the opening theme, "The Heady Feeling of Freedom" and "Good, or Don't Be", were used; the former is a strings arrangement, while the latter is a piano arrangement. Remixes of the single also appeared on several Dancemania compilations. Shihori's version appeared on Dancemania Summer Story 2008 (25 June 2008), Wa-euro Best (5 August 2009), Dancemania Summer Story 2009 (10 June 2009), and Best of Wa-euro Best (21 July 2010); Mint's version appeared on Himetra Best (14 May 2008) and Himetra Anime*Mix (21 January 2009), while Diana Gross's version appeared on the compilation Hime Trance 3. Other remixes appeared on the Dancemania Speed compilations Anime Speed (25 May 2005), Anime Speed Newtype Edition (19 July 2006), Happy Speed (18 April 2007), and Himetra Speed (30 July 2008). Other versions appeared on Takahashi's albums; King Records held the rights to the original arrangement, so other record companies releasing Takahashi's music had to use different arrangements. A "Version '96" appeared on the album Best Pieces, released on February 10, 1999, and later on Super Value Yoko Takahashi, released on December 19, 2001, by Universal Music. The album ～refrain～The songs were inspired by Evangelion (November 6, 1997) included a remix named "Ambivalence Mix" and an instrumental version titled Epilogue de these, credited to Tony Orly. A new version of "The Cruel Angel's Thesis" titled "Remix for Peace" appeared on Takahashi's album Best Pieces II, released on February 10, 1999, and later appeared on several of her compilations, including Yoko Takahashi Best 10 (January 17, 2007), Yoko Takahashi Essential Best (December 19, 2007), and Golden☆Best Yoko Takahashi, released in editions dated February 25, 2004, December 5, 2012, and December 5, 2018.

An additional remix, "Harmonia Version", appeared on LI-La, another album by the performer, and later on the 2013 reissue Li-La +3, together with the "Remix for Peace". In 2005, Takahashi recorded another version of the song for the series' tenth anniversary, forty-seven seconds longer than the original. Titled "10th Anniversary Version", it appeared as the twelfth track on Neon Genesis Evangelion Decade. In 2009, Takahashi recorded new versions of "Zankoku na tenshi no these" and "Fly Me to the Moon", released as a single on May 13 as image songs for the pachinko machine CR Shinseiki Evangelion: Saigo no shisha (ＣＲ新世紀エヴァンゲリオン ～最後のシ者～; lit. 'CR New Century Evangelion: The Last Messenger'); Takeshi Honda designed the single's cover. The 2009 version later appeared on Takahashi's 20th century Boys & Girls collection, released on June 23, 2010, and, in 2019, on the mini-album Evangelion Extreme, released by King Amusement Creative with songs associated with Evangelion pachinko and pachislot machines. In 2015, Takahashi recorded an acoustic version of the song mostly in a single live take, for her album 20th century Boys & Girls II, released by King Records on April 22, 2015. Two years later, the anthology Yoko Sings Forever (March 22, 2017) included a new arrangement of the song; Takahashi recorded it live with Marashii on piano and Satoshi Takebe on organ. In July 2019, a version of "Zankoku na tenshi no these" recorded for a collaboration with the strategy game The Battle Cats replaced the song's lyrics entirely with nya (にゃ), the Japanese equivalent of "meow", sung by Takahashi. Oricon and MaiDiGiTV later uploaded videos of the version to their YouTube channels; both surpassed one million views. In the same year, Eitetsu Hayashi arranged a new version of "The Cruel Angel's Thesis" centered on traditional Japanese taiko drums; King Amusement Creative previewed it on its official YouTube channel under the title "Zankoku na tenshi no these: Matsuri Spirit" before its release on July 24.

=== International versions ===
Neon Genesis Evangelion was introduced to mainland China in 1999. Shenzhen TV acquired the rights to the series and produced a Chinese-language dub, which did not pass the Chinese broadcasting authorities' review. The broadcaster consequently had the series translated and dubbed again, removing portions considered unsuitable for younger audiences and adapting the theme song as well. In 2001, the Liaoning People's Art Theatre produced the Chinese version, altering the dialogue and changing the series' title to Tiānyīng Zhànshì (天鹰战士). The theme song was changed to Měilì tiānshǐ xíngdòng gānglǐng (美丽天使行动纲领, lit. "The beautiful angel's plan of action"), with Chinese lyrics performed by a Chinese singer. After these changes, the version passed the review; Shenzhen TV was the first station to broadcast it, followed by terrestrial television stations across China. The Chinese theme song also became known as Yǒnggǎn de shàonián (勇敢的少年, lit. "The brave boy").

== Cover versions ==
In 1996, the soundtrack album Neon Genesis Evangelion Addition was released; it included "Zankoku na tenshi no these (Director's Edit. Version II)", a 4:04 version performed by Kotono Mitsuishi, Megumi Hayashibara, and Yūko Miyamura, who voiced Misato Katsuragi, Rei Ayanami, and Asuka Langley Soryu, respectively. On March 30, 2001, the album The Birthday of Rei Ayanami was released; it included Hayashibara's "A.D.2001" version of "The Cruel Angel's Thesis". An earlier "Ayanami Version" appeared on bertemu, released on November 1, 1996, while the "A.D.2001" version was later included as a bonus track on Center Color, released on January 7, 2004. Hayashibara said that while singing "The Cruel Angel's Thesis", she pictured the scene from the Evangelion film version in which Rei smiles at Shinji Ikari for the first time.

Megumi Ogata, Shinji's voice actress, has performed the song in concert. Junko Iwao, who voiced Hikari Horaki, also recorded a bossa nova arrangement for her album Anime On Bossa, released on January 30, 2008. Numerous other artists have recorded or performed covers of "A Cruel Angel's Thesis", among them Shōko Nakagawa, MIQ, Yōko Ishida, Masami Okui, Shizuka Itō, Mikuni Shimokawa, Toshi, Tongo, Aya Hirano, Arlie Ray, Ryō Horikawa, Chihiro Yonekura, Akina Nakamori, Maya Sakura, Konomi Suzuki, Kikuko Inoue, Natsuki Katō, AmaLee, and Ryoma Takeuchi. Groups and collaborative acts have also recorded or performed the song, including Animetal USA, Anipunk, Globe, Move, Flow, Glay, Glory Gospel Singers, Anime That Jazz!, Max, Roselia, a band from the media franchise BanG Dream!, and Steve Aoki, Gammer, and Dimatik, who collaborated on a remake of the song. In September 2026, The Weeknd debuted an unreleased song sampling "A Cruel Angel's Thesis" at Belluna Dome in Saitama, Japan; NME identified the track as "Tokyo", although its official title and release date had yet to be announced.

== Track listings ==
Original version: October 25, 1995; All tracks performed by Yōko Takahashi.

Track listing
No.	Title	Lyrics	Music	Arrangement	Length
1.	"Zankoku na tenshi no tēze"	Neko Oikawa	Hidetoshi Satō	Toshiyuki Ōmori	4:03
2.	"Tsuki no Meikyū (月の迷宮; "Labyrinth of the Moon")"				5:42
3.	"Zankoku na tenshi no tēze (Original Karaoke)"		Satō	Ōmori	4:03
4.	"Tsuki no meikyū (Original Karaoke)"				5:42

"Zankoku na Tenshi no Tēze/Fly Me to the Moon"
October 25, 1995

Track listing
No.	Title	Writer(s)	Artist	Length
1.	"Zankoku na tenshi no tēze"	Neko Oikawa; Hidetoshi Satō; Toshiyuki Ōmori	Yōko Takahashi	4:03
2.	"Fly Me to the Moon"	Bart Howard	Claire	4:31

"Zankoku na Tenshi no Tēze/Fly Me to the Moon" (10th Anniversary Renewal)
March 26, 2003. All tracks performed by Yōko Takahashi, except where noted.

Track listing
No.	Title	Writer(s)	Artist	Length
1.	"Zankoku na Tenshi no tēze"	Neko Oikawa; Hidetoshi Satō; Toshiyuki Ōmori		4:03
2.	"Fly Me to the Moon"	Bart Howard	Claire	4:32
3.	"Zankoku na tenshi no tēze (Off Vocal version)"	Satō; Ōmori		4:03
4.	"Fly Me to the Moon (Off Vocal version)"	Howard	Claire	4:32
5.	"Zankoku na Tenshi no tēze" (Director's edit version)"	Oikawa; Satō; Ōmori		4:03

"Zankoku na Tenshi no Tēze 2009 version"
May 13, 2009; All tracks performed by Yōko Takahashi.

Track listing
No.	Title	Writer(s)	Length
1.	"Zankoku na tenshi no tēze 2009 Version"	Neko Oikawa; Hidetoshi Satō; Toshiyuki Ōmori	4:26
2.	"Fly Me to the Moon 2009 Version"	Bart Howard	4:32
3.	"One Little Wish"		5:00
4.	"Zankoku na tenshi no tēze 2009 Version (off vocal)"	Satō; Ōmori	4:26
5.	"Fly Me to the Moon 2009 Version (off vocal)"	Howard	4:32
6.	"One Little Wish (off vocal)"		5:01

"A Cruel Angel's Thesis/Soul's Refrain"
June 20, 2018

Track listing
No.	Title	Lyrics	Music	Arrangement	Length
1.	"A Cruel Angel's Thesis"	Neko Oikawa	Hidetoshi Satō	Toshiyuki Ōmori	4:07
2.	"Soul's Refrain"				5:14
3.	"A Cruel Angel's Thesis Off Vocal Ver."		Satō	Ōmori	4:06
4.	"Soul's Refrain Off Vocal Ver."				5:09

"Zankoku na Tenshi no Tēze Matsuri Spirit"
July 24, 2019

All music is composed by Hidetoshi Satō. All tracks are arranged by Toshiyuki Ōmori.

Track listing
No.	Title	Lyrics	Length
1.	"Zankoku na Tenshi no Tēze Matsuri Spirit"	Neko Oikawa	4:36
2.	"Zankoku na Tenshi no Tēze Matsuri Spirit Off Vocal Ver."		5:14

== Charts ==
=== Weekly charts ===
Weekly chart performance for "The Cruel Angel's Thesis"
Chart (1995)	Peak position
Japan (Oricon)	27

Weekly chart performance for "The Cruel Angel's Thesis/Fly Me to the Moon"
Chart (1995)	Peak position
Japan (Oricon)	17

Weekly chart performance for "The Cruel Angel's Thesis/Fly Me to the Moon" (10th Anniversary Renewal)
Chart (2003)	Peak position
Japan (Oricon)	41

Weekly chart performance for "The Cruel Angel's Thesis" (2009 Version)
Chart (2009)	Peak position
Japan (Oricon)	22

Weekly chart performance for "The Cruel Angel's Thesis/Soul's Refrain"
Chart (2018)	Peak position
Japan (Oricon)	36

Weekly chart performance for "The Cruel Angel's Thesis Matsuri Spirit"
Chart (2019)	Peak position
Japan (Oricon)	142

=== Year-end charts ===
1995 year-end chart performance for "The Cruel Angel's Thesis"
Chart (1995)	Position
Japan (Oricon)	191

1996 year-end chart performance for "The Cruel Angel's Thesis"
Chart (1996)	Position
Japan (Oricon)	161

1997 year-end chart performance for "The Cruel Angel's Thesis"
Chart (1997)	Position
Japan (Oricon)	156

== Certifications ==
Sale certifications for "The Cruel Angel's Thesis"
Region	Certification	Certified units/sales
France (SNEP)	Gold	100,000
Japan (RIAJ) (Physical)	Gold	200,000^{^}
Japan (RIAJ) (Ringtone downloads)	Million	1,000,000^{*}
Japan (RIAJ) (Full song downloads)	Million	1,000,000^{*}
Japan (RIAJ) The Cruel Angel's Thesis/Fly Me to the Moon (Physical)	Platinum	400,000^{^}
Japan (RIAJ) The Cruel Angel's Thesis 2009 Version (Full length ringtone)	Gold	100,000^{*}
Japan (RIAJ) The Cruel Angel's Thesis (Directors Edit Version) (Full song downloads)	Gold	100,000^{*}
Streaming
Japan (RIAJ)	Platinum	100,000,000^{†}
^{*} Sales figures based on certification alone.^{^} Shipments figures based on certification alone.

== Notes ==
=== Bibliography ===
- Morikawa, Kaichiro (1997). The Evangelion Style (in Japanese). Daisan Shokan. ISBN 4-8074-9718-9.
- エヴァンゲリオン用語事典 第2版 (in Japanese). 八幡書店. 1998. ISBN 978-4-89350-327-5.
- Takeda, Yasuhiro (2005). The Notenki Memoirs - Studio Gainax and the Man Who Created Evangelion. ADV Manga. ISBN 1-4139-0234-0.
- Bartoli, Fabio (2008). "Neon Genesis Evangelion e la Kabbalah: dal Tempo di dolore al Tempo Benedetto" (PDF). Antrocom (in Italian). 4 (1): 34. Archived (PDF) from the original on 22 April 2018.
- Horn, Carl Gustav (2013). "Behold the Angels of God descending". Neon Genesis Evangelion 3-in-1 Edition. Vol. 3. Viz Media. ISBN 978-1-4215-5362-7.
- Oikawa, Neko (2018). ネコの手も貸したい 及川眠子流作詞術 (in Japanese). Ritter Music. ISBN 978-4-8456-3267-1.
- Hashimoto, Manabu (2018). "高橋洋子×大森俊之スペシャル対談". Newtype (in Japanese). 34 (7). Kadokawa Shoten.
- Marine, Alexandre (2021). Neon Genesis Evangelion: Le renouveau de l'animation japonaise (in French). Pix'n love Editions. ISBN 978-2-37188-093-1.
- Takahashi, Yōko (2021). 残酷な天使のテーゼ」「魂のルフラン」をだれよりも上手に歌えるようになる本 : 高橋洋子のヴォーカル・レッスン (in Japanese). Rittor Music. ISBN 978-4-8456-3586-3.
- Nebbia, Virginie (2023). La Saga Evangelion: L'oeuvre d'une vie (in French). Third Editions. ISBN 978-2-3778-4430-2. Archived from the original on 25 October 2023.
- Sellés de Lucas, Victor; Hernández-Pérez, Manuel (2024). "Exegesis and authorial agency through Judeo-Christian iconography in Japanese anime: Neon Genesis Evangelion (1995-97) as an open work". Imafronte (31). Universidad de Murcia: 224–237.
