= Obsession (band) =

American heavy metal band

- Origin: Shelton, Connecticut, U.S.
- Genres: Heavy metal, power metal
- Years active: 1982–1989, 2004–present
- Labels: Mausoleum Records, Ulterium – Inner Wound Records, Enigma
- Members: Michael Vescera; John Bruno; Scott Boland; Jeff Curtiss; Yanni Sofianos
- Past members: Jay Mezias; Bruce Vitale; Art Maco; Matt Karagus; Chris McCarvill; BJ Zampa
- Website: theobsession.net

Obsession is an American heavy metal band formed in 1982, and noted for spawning the career of singer Michael Vescera. The band first came on to the scene on the Metal Massacre 2 compilation from Metal Blade Records. After that, the band released the EP Marshall Law and the albums Scarred for Life and Methods of Madness under the Enigma label. They broke up in 1989, and reformed in 2004 and then released the album Carnival of Lies in 2006 with Mausoleum Records.

Obsession then signed to the Ulterium – Inner Wound record label to release their latest album, Order of Chaos, in 2012.

Obsession provided songs for the films Sleepaway Camp II, Sleepaway Camp III as well as for Leatherface: The Texas Chainsaw Massacre III.

The band also appears on the compilation albums Metal Blade 15th Anniversary from Metal Blade Records and Heavy Metal Machine – Pull One from Medusa Records.

== Band members ==
=== Current ===
- Michael Vescera – vocals (1982–1989, 2004–present)
- John Bruno – guitars (2004–2014, 2023–present)
- Scott Boland – guitars (2004–2014, 2023–present)
- Matt Karagus – bass (1982–1989, 2023–present)
- Jay Mezias – drums (1982–1989, 2004–2009, 2023–present)

=== Former ===
- Art Maco – guitars (1982–1989)
- Bruce Vitale – guitars (1982–1989)
- Chris McCarvill – bass (2004–2014)
- BJ Zampa – drums (2009–2014)

== Discography ==
- Marshall Law (1984)
- Scarred for Life (1986)
- Methods of Madness (1987)
- Carnival of Lies (2006)
- Obsession (2008, compilation)
- Order of Chaos (2012)

== Bibliography ==
- Nelson, Dan (2008). All Known Metal Bands. McSweeney's. ISBN 978-1-932416-92-3.

== Sources ==
- "OBSESSION – New Album Complete, New Promo Photo Unveiled". Bravewords.com.
