= Japanese hardcore =

Hardcore punk scene in Japan

Japanese hardcore is the hardcore punk scene in Japan, which originated to protest the social and economic changes sweeping the country in the 1980s. The band SS is regarded as the first, forming in 1977. Bands such as The Stalin and GISM soon followed, forming in 1980 and 1981 respectively. Occasionally, Japanese hardcore musicians include elements of avant-garde, crossover thrash, thrash metal, anarcho-punk, horror punk, D-beat, post-hardcore and grindcore in their songs.

== List of notable bands ==
- Anti Feminism
- Aburadako
- Bastard
- Bachikaburi (early)
- BBQ Chickens
- Bomb Factory
- Boredoms
- The Comes
- Confuse
- Crow
- Crude
- Death Side
- Dyingrace
- Disclose
- Envy
- Fuck On The Beach
- GISM
- Gai
- Garlic Boys
- GAS
- Gastunk
- Gauze
- Gendo Missile
- The Gerogerigegege
- Gloom
- Gudon
- Kruelty
- Kuro
- Lip Cream
- The Mad Capsule Markets
- Masturbation
- Melt-Banana
- Nightmare
- S.O.B.
- SS
- The Stalin
- The Swankys
- Think Again
- Vivisick
- Zouo

== Sources ==
- Hoare, James. "Japanese Grindcore". Terrorizer issue 180, February 2009, p. 52-53.
