= Loud Park Festival =

Annual heavy metal festival in Japan

- Genre: Heavy metal
- Dates: Mid-October
- Locations: Saitama Super Arena in Saitama City, Makuhari Messe in Chiba City, Zepp Osaka in Osaka, Osaka-jo Hall in Osaka, Kobe World Kinen Hall in Kobe
- Years active: 2006-2017, 2023, 2025
- Website: Loud Park

The Loud Park Festival (ラウドパーク, Raudo Pāku) is a heavy metal festival held annually at Saitama Super Arena in Saitama City or Makuhari Messe in Chiba City, Japan. It's one of the biggest heavy metal festivals in Japan.

The festival has featured both Japanese and international performers such as DragonForce, Judas Priest, Megadeth, Slayer, Circus Maximus, Napalm Death, Angra, Loudness, Anthem, United, Outrage, Galneryus, Dir En Grey and Babymetal.

In 2018, it was announced that the event will not be held that year and will be discontinued "due to various circumstances", but had plans to return in the future.

In 2022, it was announced that it will take place in March 2023 only and it was announced Pantera would be the headliner.

On March 30, 2025, it was announced that Parkway Drive would be the headliner at Loud Park 25, which would take place on October 13 of that year.

== 2025 (October 13) ==
Bands confirmed for Loud Park Festival 25: Held at Saitama Super Arena.

- Parkway Drive
- Bullet for My Valentine
- Kerry King
- The Haunted
- The Ghost Inside
- Heaven Shall Burn
- Orbit Culture
- Crystal Lake
- Sable Hills
- Ulma Sound Junction
- View from the Soyuz
- Phantom Excaliver

== 2023 (March 25–26) ==
Bands confirmed for Loud Park Festival 23: Held at Makuhari Messe on the 26, at Intex Osaka on the 25.

- Pantera
- Kreator
- Nightwish
- Stratovarius
- Carcass (Only in Tokyo)
- Amaranthe (Only in Tokyo)
- Bleed from Within
- Outrage (Only in Tokyo)
- H.E.R.O. (Only in Tokyo)
- Jason Richardson & Luke Holland (Only in Tokyo)
- Bridear (Only in Tokyo)
- Phantom Excaliver (Only in Tokyo)

== 2017 (October 14–15) ==
Bands confirmed for Loud Park Festival 17: Held at Saitama Super Arena on both days.

October 14

- Slayer
- Emperor
- Alice Cooper
- Overkill
- Opeth
- Winger
- Brujeria
- Anthem
- L.A. Guns
- Beyond the Black
- Skindred
- Aldious

October 15

- Michael Schenker Fest
- Gene Simmons Band
- Sabaton
- Meshuggah
- Cradle of Filth
- Black Star Riders
- Devin Townsend Project
- Loudness
- Apocalyptica
- Outrage
- Black Earth
- Cry Venom

== 2016 (October 8–9) ==
Bands confirmed for Loud Park Festival 16: Held at Saitama Super Arena on both days.

October 8

- Scorpions
- Armored Saint
- Blind Guardian
- Cain's Offering
- Children of Bodom (once cancelled, but they withdrew the cancel later)
- Danger Danger
- Dokken
- Exodus
- Masterplan
- Myrath
- Queensrÿche
- Shinedown
- Aldious
- Sons of Texas
- Zardonic
- Flesh Juicer
- Metal Church (cancelled)

October 9

- Whitesnake
- Amorphis
- Dark Funeral
- The Dead Daisies
- Dizzy Mizz Lizzy
- Enslaved
- Killswitch Engage
- Kuni
- Lacuna Coil
- Nightwish
- Riot
- Savage Messiah
- Sixx:A.M.
- Symphony X
- Terrorizer
- Uli Jon Roth
- With the Dead
- Nocturnal Bloodlust

== 2015 (October 10–11) ==
Bands confirmed for Loud Park Festival 15: Held at Saitama Super Arena on both days.

October 10

- Slayer
- Arch Enemy with Johan Liiva and Christopher Amott
- Gamma Ray
- Children Of Bodom
- Anthrax
- Royal Hunt
- Testament
- Anthem
- Backyard Babies
- HammerFall
- All That Remains
- Metal Allegiance
- Gojira
- House of Lords
- Outrage
- Galneryus
- Daita
- United
- Fruitpochette
- Metal Church (cancelled)

October 11

- Megadeth
- Helloween
- Carcass
- DragonForce
- Napalm Death
- Dizzy Mizz Lizzy
- Sabaton
- At the Gates
- Soldier of Fortune
- Dark Tranquillity
- The Local Band
- Pretty Maids
- Abbath
- Kamelot
- Mari Hamada
- Obituary
- Armageddon
- We Are Harlot
- Gyze

== 2014 (October 18–19) ==
Bands confirmed for Loud Park Festival 14: Held at Saitama Super Arena on both days.

October 18

- Manowar (cancelled due to the delay of equipment)
- Arch Enemy
- DragonForce
- Rage
- Down
- Amaranthe
- Soilwork
- Loudness
- Vandenberg's Moonkings
- Marty Friedman
- Battle Beast
- Kamen Jyoshi

October 19

- Dream Theater
- Kreator
- Within Temptation
- Death Angel
- Riot
- The Haunted
- Thunder
- Belphegor
- The Gazette
- Glamour of the Kill
- Periphery
- Arion

== 2013 (October 19–20) ==
Bands confirmed for Loud Park Festival 13: Held at Saitama Super Arena on both days.

October 19

- Stone Temple Pilots with Chester Bennington
- Europe
- Angra
- Carcass
- Behemoth
- Lynch Mob
- Lordi
- Therion
- Devin Townsend Project
- Bring Me the Horizon
- Crossfaith
- Lost Society

October 20

- King Diamond (cancelled due to the delay of equipment)
- Yngwie Malmsteen
- Stratovarius
- Last in Line
- Trivium
- Spiritual Beggars
- Babymetal
- Amorphis
- Mokoma
- Enforcer
- Breaking Arrows
- Metal Clone X

== 2012 (October 27) ==
Bands confirmed for Loud Park Festival 12: Saitama Super Arena

October 27
- Slayer
- Helloween
- In Flames
- Children of Bodom
- Sonata Arctica
- Dir En Grey
- Buckcherry
- Cryptopsy
- DragonForce
- 1349
- Hibria
- Outrage
- Halestorm
- Naglfar
- Circus Maximus
- Cristopher Amott
- Stone Sour (cancelled due to Jim Root's illness)

== 2011 (October 15) ==
Bands confirmed for Loud Park Festival 11: Saitama Super Arena

October 15

- Limp Bizkit
- Whitesnake
- Arch Enemy
- The Darkness
- Trivium
- Unisonic
- United
- Krokus
- Amaranthe
- Stryper
- August Burns Red
- Animetal USA

== 2010 (October 16–17) ==
Bands confirmed for Loud Park Festival 10: Held at Saitama Super Arena on both days, and also at Kobe World Kinen Hall on the 16.

October 16

- Korn
- Halford
- Stone Sour
- Accept
- Ratt
- Hellyeah
- Dir En Grey
- Edguy
- Amon Amarth
- Chthonic
- Engel
- Holy Grail

October 17

- Ozzy Osbourne (in Kobe on the 16)
- Avenged Sevenfold (in Kobe on the 16)
- Motörhead (in Kobe on the 16)
- Angra (in Kobe on the 16)
- Spiritual Beggars (in Kobe on the 16)
- Kuni (in Kobe on the 16)
- Alexisonfire
- Reckless Love
- Halestorm
- Turisas (in Kobe on the 16)
- Trash Talk
- 3 Inches of Blood
- Loudness (only in Kobe on the 16)
- Five Finger Death Punch (cancelled)

== 2009 (October 17–18) ==
Bands confirmed for Loud Park Festival 09: Makuhari Messe

October 17

- Judas Priest
- Megadeth
- Poison the Well
- Arch Enemy
- Lynch Mob
- Anthrax
- Led Zepagain
- Dokken
- Loudness
- Hiroaki Tagawa
- Firebird
- Fade
- Outrage
- Liv Moon
- Steel Panther
- Blessed by a Broken Heart
- Ace Frehley (cancelled)

October 18

- Slayer
- Rob Zombie
- Children of Bodom
- Anvil
- Fair Warning
- Gotthard
- Papa Roach
- Napalm Death
- Royal Hunt
- Hatebreed
- Galneryus
- Hibria
- Lazarus A.D.
- Crossfaith
- H.E.A.T
- Dead by April
- Steadlür (cancelled)

== 2008 (October 18–19) ==
Bands confirmed for Loud Park Festival 08: Saitama Super Arena

October 18

- Slipknot
- Down
- Avenged Sevenfold
- Carcass
- Sonata Arctica
- DragonForce
- Meshuggah
- Obituary
- Apocalyptica
- Airbourne
- Secret and Whisper
- Head Phones President

October 19

- Mötley Crüe
- Buckcherry
- Bullet for My Valentine
- Machine Head
- Loaded
- Black Tide
- All Ends
- Black Stone Cherry

== 2007 (October 20–23) ==
Bands confirmed for Loud Park Festival 07: Held at Saitama Super Arena on the 20 and 21, at Zepp Osaka on the 22, and at Osaka-jo Hall on the 23.

October 20

- Heaven and Hell (also October 23)
- Blind Guardian
- Trivium
- Machine Head
- Nocturnal Rites
- As I Lay Dying
- Nile (also October 23)
- Fastway
- Still Remains
- Therion
- Outrage
- Cellador

October 21

- Marilyn Manson (also October 23)
- Arch Enemy (also October 22)
- Hanoi Rocks
- Saxon (also October 22))
- Satyricon
- Tesla
- Lacuna Coil
- Wig Wam
- Andre Matos
- Anthem
- Amorphis
- All That Remains
- GNZ-Word (October 22)
- Kazuyuki Matsumoto (October 23)

== 2006 (October 14–15) ==
Bands confirmed for Loud Park Festival 06: Makuhari Messe

October 14

- Megadeth
- Anthrax
- Napalm Death
- Angra
- Arch Enemy
- United
- Dir En Grey
- Cathedral
- Legend of Rock
- Backyard Babies
- DragonForce
- Firewind
- Hardcore Superstar
- Opeth
- Zeromind
- Anvil
- Flyleaf
- Nora
- Korpiklaani (cancelled)
- Ministry (cancelled)

October 15

- Slayer
- Dio
- Negative
- Children of Bodom
- Killswitch Engage
- Survive
- In Flames
- Hatebreed
- Mucc
- Mastodon
- Unearth
- The Black Dahlia Murder
- Lamb of God
- Within Temptation
- Cocobat
- Bloodsimple
- As I Lay Dying
- Loyal to the Grave
- Bullet for My Valentine (cancelled)
