= Outrage (band) =

Japanese metal band

- Origin: Nagoya, Japan
- Genres: Thrash metal; speed metal; hard rock
- Years active: 1982–present
- Labels: Pile Driver; Polydor; MMG/East West Japan; 30min.; Victor; Thunderball 667/Universal
- Members: Yosuke Abe; Yoshihiro Yasui; Shinya Tange; Naoki Hashimoto
- Past members: Koji Niwa; Kazutoyo Ito
- Website: outrage-jp.com

Outrage (stylized as OUTRAGE) is a Japanese thrash metal band formed in Nagoya in 1982. They debuted in 1987 with a lineup of Yosuke Abe on guitar, Yoshihiro Yasui on bass, Shinya Tange on drums and Naoki Hashimoto on vocals. Hashimoto left the band in 1999, and the group continued as a trio until he returned in 2007. With a four-decade-plus career spanning, Outrage are one of the few Japanese metal bands to have never disbanded or paused activities.

== History ==
Formed in 1982 by guitarist Yosuke Abe, bassist Yoshihiro Yasui, drummer Shinya Tange and vocalist Kazutoyo Ito, Outrage was influenced by the new wave of British heavy metal (NWOBHM) in their early years. Ito left in 1986 and was replaced with Naoki Hashimoto. After self-releasing their self-titled debut EP in 1987, Outrage's first album, Black Clouds, followed in 1988 on Polydor Records. Their second album, Blind to Reality, was released in 1989, and their third, The Great Blue, in 1990.

Accept drummer Stefan Kaufmann produced 1991's The Final Day in Germany. In 1992, they supported Pantera's first Japanese tour. Outrage switched labels to East West Japan with the release of 1993's Spit. Their next two albums, 1995's Life Until Deaf and 1997's Who We Are, were produced by Michael Wagener. In 1999, singer Hashimoto left the band, and they continued as a three piece with Yasui and Abe sharing vocals. During this period, their music changed to a hard rock/stoner rock sound for 2002's 24-7 and 2004's Cause For Pause, signing to Victor Entertainment for the latter.

To celebrate the band's 20th anniversary in 2007, Naoki Hashimoto returned for a few performances, including Loud Park '07. The following year, he fully rejoined Outrage, and they released the limited edition double live album Awakening 2008, which contains performances of their albums The Final Day and Life Until Deaf in their entirety. They covered "Fight Fire with Fire" for the Metallica tribute album Metal-Ikka. In 2009, they released a new self-titled album, recorded in Sweden with Fredrik Nordström, which returned to their thrash sound. On March 23, 2010, the band received the "Aichi Prefecture Cultural Art Prize" for their musical activities in Nagoya. Outrage collaborated with mixed martial arts promotion Deep for the October 24, 2010 digital song "Dial 'A' Annihilate (Deep Fighters VS Outrage)" to celebrate their 50th tournament. The song features several Deep fighters on backing vocals, including then-current champions Yusuke Kawaguchi, Riki Fukuda, Yuya Shirai and Katsunori Kikuno.

Now with Universal, the band released the album Outraged on June 5, 2013, once again working with Nordström. Outrage performed at the Yoko Fest The Final concert on September 12, 2014 in tribute to the recently deceased bassist of fellow thrash metal band United. The group teamed up with Loudness to hold the first Loud∞Out Fest on May 2, 2015. Outrage released the album Genesis I on October 7. It is split into two sides; the Genesis Side composed of covers of songs by early Japanese rock bands such as Happy End, The Mops, Blues Creation and Gedō, and the Exploring Side containing original material.

In 2016, the second Loud∞Out Fest was held on May 1 and also included Anthem and Lost Society in addition to the two namesake acts. Outrage were one of 100 acts that provided a song for the video game Let It Die. With 2017 marking the 30th anniversary since their debut EP, Outrage celebrated the occasion in several ways. The 2 CD/1 DVD compilation set XXX Box was released on February 16. The 2017 edition of the Loud∞Out Fest was called a "tour" and saw two concerts on May 4 and 6 that included Galneryus. Outrage held their own festival for their anniversary called Gokuaku-sai (極悪祭) on July 23 that included Cocobat, Casbah, Doom, Angel Witch, Singo Otani (United), Hideki Ishima and themselves. The band released their thirteenth album Raging Out, which was mixed by Peter Tägtgren, on October 11.

In 2019, Outrage celebrated the 40th anniversary of the NWOBHM. They released a cover of Jaguar's "Axe Crazy" as a limited edition 7-inch vinyl EP, backed with a cover of "Baphomet" by Angel Witch, on April 24. Their fourteenth studio album, Run Riot, was released on April 15, 2020. To celebrate the band's 35th anniversary in 2022, they released a compilation album on April 20, held a special concert with an orchestra on April 24, and released a film based on the band in May. The film, Hagane Iro no Sora no Kanata he (鋼音色の空の彼方へ), is based on the story of Outrage and drafted by music critic Masanori Ito. The album, Square, Triangle, Circle & Future, compiles songs from their career, including a demo with original vocalist Kazutoyo Ito and two new tracks written for the film.

== Influences ==
Abe included Michael Schenker, Uli Jon Roth, the Eagles and Diamond Head as some of his favorite musical acts, and cited Schenker, Roth and Diamond Head's Brian Tatler as his idols. Yasui named Venom, Motörhead, the Beatles, GBH and the Damned as his favorite bands, and cited Lemmy and Conrad "Cronos" Lant as his idols. Tange listed Lemmy and Bono as his favorite musicians, and also cited the former as his idol. Hashimoto included Deep Purple, Iron Maiden, Whitesnake, GBH, Kate Bush and the Damned as some of his favorite acts, and cited Ian Gillan as his idol.

== Members ==
Current members

- Yosuke Abe (阿部洋介) – guitar, backing vocals (1982–present), vocals (1998–2007)
- Yoshihiro Yasui (安井義博) – bass, backing vocals (1982–present), vocals (1998–2007)
- Shinya Tange (丹下眞也) – drums (1982–present)
- Naoki Hashimoto (橋本直樹) – vocals (1986–1999, 2007–present)

Former members

- Koji Niwa (丹羽コージ) – guitar (1983–1985)
- Kazutoyo Ito (伊藤千豊) – vocals (1982–1986)

== Discography ==
=== Studio albums ===
- Black Clouds (1988)
- Blind to Reality (1989)
- The Great Blue (1990) Oricon Albums Chart Ranking: No. 66
- The Final Day (1991) No. 66
- Spit (1993) No. 46
- Life Until Deaf (1995) No. 56
- Who We Are (1997) No. 43
- 24-7 (2002)
- Cause For Pause (2004)
- Outrage (2009) No. 66
- Outraged (June 5, 2013) No. 32
- Genesis I (October 7, 2015) No. 77
- Raging Out (October 11, 2017) No. 28
- Run Riot (April 15, 2020) No. 23

=== EPs ===
- Outrage (1987)
- Painted Black (1999, unreleased)
- Volume One (2001)
- Play Loud (2002)
- Axe Crazy (2019)

=== Singles ===
- "Love Song" (1991)
- "Deadbeat" (2004)

=== Other albums ===
- Days of Rage 1986-1991 (1995, best of album)
- It's Packed!! (1997, live and rare album) No. 49
- Nagoya Noise Pollution Orchestra (2003, compilation album)
- Live & Rare Vol.1 (2003, live album)
- Live & Rare Vol.1 (2007, live album)
- The Years of Rage (2008, live album and DVD)
- Awakening 2008 (2008, live album) No. 213
- Live! Rise and Shine (2010, live album) No. 285
- Discovery Box (2010, 5 CD & 1 DVD box set)
- XXX Box (2017, 2 CD & 1 DVD box set) No. 62
- "Re:prise" ~ The Final Day 30th Anniversary (2021, 2 CD & 1 DVD box set) No. 74
- Square, Triangle, Circle & Future (2022, 1 CD & 1 DVD compilation) No. 63

=== Videos ===
- The Official Bootleg (1992, VHS)
- The Official Bootleg 2 (1995, VHS)
- The Curtain of History Old Whores and Encores (2007, DVD)
- The Years of Rage (2008, DVD and live album) Oricon DVDs Chart Ranking: No. 82
- Shine On Travelogue of Outrage (2011, documentary) No. 94
- Loud∞Out Fest 2016 (2016) No. 61
- Gokuaku-sai 2017 (極悪祭2017; 2018) No. 82
- 11281 ~Ikaru~ (11281～怒～; 2018) No. 39
- Hagane Iro no Sora no Kanata he (鋼音色の空の彼方へ; 2023, biographical film)
- Pulse→Signals (2023)
