= The Comes =

Japanese hardcore punk band

- Origin: Tokyo, Japan
- Genres: Hardcore punk
- Years active: 1982–present
- Labels: City Rocker Records; Dogma Records; Captain Records; Dear Records.
- Members: Chitose; Matsumura; Minoru Ogawa; Naoki; Tetsu

The Comes was a Japanese hardcore punk band formed in Tokyo, Japan in 1982. They were one of the first Japanese hardcore bands alongside GISM, Gauze and Lip Cream. The Comes were fronted by female vocalist Chitose, who went to sing in the metal band Virgin Rocks. Chitose was the first vocalist of female-fronted hardcore punk bands to gain fame. Guitarist Naoki and drummer Matsumura both went on to Gastunk. Minoru Ogawa went on to join Naoki in Lip Cream.

== Discography ==
Compilations

- Outsider (City Rocker Records, 1982)
- Live 1982-1984 (SS Recordings 2008)
- Live 1985-1986 (SS Recordings 2010)

Albums

- No Side (Dogma Records, 1984)
- Power Never Die (Captain Records/Dear Records, 1986)
