= Gism =

Gism may refer to:

- A slang term for semen
- GISM, a Japanese hardcore punk band
