= Doom (Japanese band) =

Japanese thrash metal band

- Origin: Tokyo, Japan
- Genres: Thrash metal; progressive metal; avant-garde metal
- Years active: 1985–2000, 2014-present
- Label: Victor/Invitation
- Members: Takashi "Taka" Fujita; Shigeru "Pazz" Kobayashi; Yukiya Abe
- Past members: Masami Chiba; Koh Morota; Jouichi "Joe" Hirakawa; Takatoshi Kodaira
- Website: http://doom-real.com/

Doom is a Japanese thrash metal band formed in Tokyo in 1985. The first line up included co-founders Takashi "Taka" Fujita (vocals/guitar) and Koh "Pirarucu" Morota (fretless bass), and Jouichi "Joe" Hirokawa (drums). Yuichi Masukawa of Headbang magazine credited Doom as one of the "Four Heavenly Kings of Japanese Thrash", alongside United, Casbah and Jurassic Jade.

== History ==
Doom was formed by guitarist and vocalist Takashi "Taka" Fujita and bassist Koh "Pirarucu" Morota. Because they did not have a drummer, X Japan's Yoshiki helped them out, before Koh's former Zadkiel bandmate Jouichi "Joe" Hirokawa officially joined. The group released their first EP Go Mad Yourself! in 1986, and the debut album No More Pain followed in 1987. The group gained a lot of popularity and signed to the Japanese label Invitation. The band continued to release many more albums and even played a gig in the United States at CBGB's in October 1988. After releasing Incompetent... in 1989, Jouichi left the band and was replaced by Gastunk drummer Shigeru "Pazz" Kobayashi. On May 7, 1999, co-founder Koh was found dead, having apparently drowned. Doom released their final album Where Your Life Lies!? in November 1999, before going on hiatus in August 2000.

In 2014, Fujita and Pazz were joined by Casbah/Skull Smash bassist Kodaira for a short 15-minute set at a tribute event for United bassist Akihiro Yokoyama, who died that May. Doom later announced they would re-form, and had their first full performance on January 12, 2015, at Club Citta in Kawasaki.

On 14 December 2015, it was announced on the band's official Facebook page that they had recorded a new album called Still Can't The Dead, they revealed the artwork as well. The new album is set to be released on March 2, 2016. Later that month, the band revealed the track list on their Twitter account.

== Members ==
=== Current members ===
- Takashi "Taka" Fujita – vocals, guitar (1985–2000, 2014–present)
- Shigeru "Pazz" Kobayashi – drums (1990–2000, 2014–present)
- Yukiya Abe – bass (2019–present)

=== Former members ===
- Jouichi "Joe" Hirokawa – drums (1985–1990)
- Koh "Pirarucu" Morota – bass (1985–1994; died 1999)
- Masami Chiba – bass (1994–2000)
- Takatoshi Kodaira – bass (2014–2019)

=== Support musicians ===
- Yoshiki Hayashi – drums (live – 1985)
- Naruyoshi Kikuchi – saxophone (guest – 1991)

== Discography ==
=== Albums ===
- No More Pain (1987)
- Complicated Mind (1988)
- Incompetent... (1989)
- Human Noise (1991)
- Doom VI – Illegal Soul (1992)
- Where Your Life Lies!? (1999)
- Still Can't the Dead (2016)

=== Singles ===
- "Why!?/Last Stand to Hell" (1986)
- "Freakout" (1995)

=== EPs ===
- Go Mad Yourself! (1986)
- Killing Field (1988)
- The Nightmare Runs with Cocobat (split EP, 1993)
- Sure with Hedgehog (split EP, 1994)

=== Compilations ===
- No More Pain – Complete Explosionworks Session (2015)
- Instruction Manual... 1988–1991 (2016)

=== Compilation appearances ===
- "You End.Get Up! You" – Skull Thrash Zone Vol.1 (1987)
- "Doom's Day" – Skull Thrash Zone Vol.1 (1987)
- "Will Never End" – Dance 2 Noise 003 (1992)
- "1st Wild Thrush of Fear" – Rad (1993)
- "Parasite" – Dance 2 Noise 006 (1993)
- "The Scraps Screamed" – New Konservatiw (1994)
- "Afraid..." – Extreme Hot Candy the News from Far East Loud Scene (1994)
- "Taste" – The Nightmare Runs (1995)

=== Video albums ===
- Insomniac Days: The History of Doom (2017)
