= Angry Fist =

- North American cover

Studio album by Hi-Standard
- Released: May 14, 1997
- Recorded: Motor Studio, San Francisco, California, US
- Genre: Punk rock
- Length: 33:04
- Label: Toy's Factory
- Producer: Ryan Greene; Hi-Standard

Hi-Standard chronology
Growing Up (1996)	Angry Fist (1997)	Making the Road (1999)

Angry Fist is the second album by Japanese punk rock band, Hi-Standard. It was released by Toy's Factory in May 1997. Fat Wreck Chords released the album in North America in July 1997.

== Track listing ==
- All songs written by Hi-Standard, unless otherwise stated.
1. "Fighting Fists, Angry Soul" – 2:23
2. "Stop the Time" – 2:40
3. "Endless Trip" – 2:18
4. "My Sweet Dog" – 1:35
5. "Shy Boy" – 1:59
6. "My Heart Feels So Free" – 2:54
7. "The Kids Are Alright" (Pete Townshend) – 1:47
8. "Gotta Pull Myself Together" (Findon, Myers, Puzey) – 2:26
9. "Start Today" – 1:11
10. "Sunshine Baby" – 2:17
11. "Pathetic Man's Song" – 2:24
12. "Have You Ever Seen the Rain?" (John Fogerty) – 1:46
13. "Sound of Secret Minds" – 2:23
14. "Spread Your Sail" – 2:42
  - Contains a hidden track, a punk cover of the "Pink Panther" theme which starts at 3:48 and ends at 5:01

== Personnel ==
- Akihiro Nanba – vocals, bass
- Ken Yokoyama – guitar, vocals
- Akira Tsuneoka – drums
- Tony Sly – backing vocals on My Sweet Dog
- Joey Cape – guest vocals
- Fat Mike – guest vocals
- Karina Denike – guest vocals
- Recorded at Motor Studio, San Francisco, California, US
- Produced by Ryan Greene and Hi-Standard
- Engineered by Ryan Greene

== Certifications and sales ==
Region	Certification	Certified units/sales
Japan	—	350,000
