= World Burns to Death =

US musical group

- Origin: Austin, Texas
- Genres: Crust punk
- Labels: Hardcore Holocaust, Prank Records, HG:Fact
- Members: Jack Control; Zac Tew; Craig Merritt; Jon Guerinot

World Burns to Death is an American crust punk band from Austin, Texas. Formed in 2000, the current lineup (as of September, 2014) consists of: Jack Control, vocals; Zac Tew, guitar; Craig Merritt, bass; and Jon Guerinot, drums. Current and former members are also involved with other bands, including Kegcharge, Severed Head of State, and Butcher.

== Name ==
World Burns to Death take their name from the title of a song by the early 1980s Finnish hardcore punk band Bastards.

== Music ==
Whom the Gods Destroy... They First Make Ridiculous
Track 6 from The Sucking of the Missile Cock

World Burns to Death's music reflects 1980s American hardcore (Negative Approach and Poison Idea), European bands influenced by, and including, Discharge, and Japanese hardcore punk.

== Imagery and lyrical themes ==
=== Imagery ===
World Burns to Death's aesthetic preference is for stark black-and-white imagery. These images mirror the lyrical themes of the band, which detail crimes against humanity, religious hypocrisy and religion's effect on society, class oppression, nationalism, and man's general inhumanity to man.

The 'tsadi' logo

The band's logo usually appears written in Hebrew. The Hebrew wording may appear to be a literal translation of the band's name, but it is not. It is also not “World Burns to Death" with the Chaya font. The tsadi (sometimes spelled "tzaadi") has become the band's logo. The logo is also noteworthy because the symbol is an inscription commonly used on Israeli army munitions.

The band's English font is an Anglicized version of Chaya font characters. This font may have been inspired by that used on the cover of Simon Wiesenthal's 1990 book Justice, Not Vengeance. Singer Jack Control designs the fonts, writes the lyrics, and provides the band's graphics.

=== Lyrical themes ===
World Burns to Death's lyrics focus on war crimes and the consequences thereof. Vocalist Jack Control in an interview stated, "Murdering the innocent in the name of 'democracy,' destabilizing economies in the name of 'capitalism,' installing brutal dictatorships in the name of 'freedom' are all terrible injustices and serve to fill the lyrical coffers of World Burns to Death".

The band's lyrics contain references to William Shakespeare, German philosopher Friedrich Nietzsche, individualist anarchist Max Stirner, leftist writers Susan Sontag and Herbert Marcuse, political prisoner Stephen Biko, and others. Also quoted are the inscriptions above concentration camps, such as the "Welcome to the Jewish State" statement written on Belzec's gates, which is quoted in the No Dawn Comes ... Night Without End EP. the imagery of death camps, gulags, and scenes of genocide is to underscore the effects of war, barbarism, and horror.

== Tours ==
One of the first of World Burns to Death's tours was the Texas-only "Triple Terror Tour" with Inepsy and Spazm 151. The arrival of 2003 saw a "Queimando Para a Morte" tour of Brazil. Fall of 2004 saw the "Ghoulish Killing Orgy" US east coast/Canadian tour; Fall of 2005 saw the "Those Who Have Come To The End" tour of the US west coast; 2007 was the Burning Spirits tour of Japan with Forward; 2008 they were back on tour in Europe for two weeks; and 2009, a second tour of Japan with Paintbox and Blow Back remembering the late guitarist of Paintbox, Chelsea. 2010 saw a tour of the US east coast and the "deep south" with Japan hardcore band, Slang.

== Members ==
=== Current members ===
- Jack Control - vocals
- Zac Tew - guitar
- Craig Merritt - bass
- Jon Guerinot - drums

== Discography ==
- World Burns to Death demo tape (35 pressed [self released]) 2001
- Human Meat ... Tossed to the Dogs of War 7-inch EP (3000 pressed [Prank Records USA]) 2001
- The Sucking of the Missile Cock LP (3000 pressed [Hardcore Holocaust Records USA]) 2002 (2000 repressed April 2004 w/black label on B side)
- The Sucking of the Missile Cock CD (3000 pressed [Hardcore Holocaust Records USA]) 2003 (500 seized by Brazilian customs)
- Acid in the Face of Human Rights 7-inch EP (1000 pressed [Fight Records] Finland) 2003
- Art of self-destruction 7-inch EP (3000 pressed [Prank Records USA]) 2003
- No Dawn Comes ... Night Without End 7-inch EP (3000 pressed [Hardcore Holocaust Records USA]) 2003
- Curse Them Forever split 7-inch EP with SICK TERROR (? pressed [Terrotten Records Brazil]) 2003
- split 7-inch EP with DISCLOSE (700 pressed [Dan-Doh Records Japan]) 2005 (? repressed 2005 [Yellowdog Records Germany] 100 w/poster, envelope, and split badge)
- Totalitarian Sodomy LP (3000 pressed [Hardcore Holocaust Records USA]) 2006. Artwork by Sakevi Yokoyama Beast Arts/GISM
- Totalitarian Sodomy CD (500 w/Japanese lyrics booklet [Hardcore Holocaust Records USA])
- Cease To Exist DVD (1000 pressed [Prank Records USA]) 2007
- Graveyard of Utopia CD/LP (HG Fact Records Japan/Prank Records USA) 2008
- "Black Becomes The Sun" 7-inch EP (1000 pressed [HG Fact Records Japan]) 2009
- split 7-inch EP with BLOW BACK (HG Fact Records Japan) 2009
- split 7-inch EP with SLANG (Prank Records USA) 2010
