= Outraged =

Studio album by Outrage
- Released: 5 June 2013
- Genre: Heavy metal, thrash metal
- Length: 44:50
- Label: Thunderball 667
- Producer: Fredrik Nordström

Outrage chronology
Outrage (2009)	Outraged (2013)

Outraged is the eleventh studio album by Japanese heavy metal band Outrage. It was released on 5 June 2013 on the Thunderball 667 label.

== Track listing ==
=== CD ===
No.	Title	Lyrics	Music	Length
1.	"Lost"	Shinya Tange, Yuko Koide	Yosuke Abe, Tange	4:14
2.	"Grip On Chains"	Tange, Koide	Abe, Tange	4:59
3.	"New Horizon (I Found You)"	Naoki Hashimoto, Koide	Yoshihiro Yasui, Hashimoto	5:01
4.	"Suck It"	Tange, Koide	Abe, Tange	2:48
5.	"Six Million Light Years"	Hashimoto, Koide	Yasui, Hashimoto	4:29
6.	"Freya" (instrumental)		Abe	2:26
7.	"This Is War"	Tange, Koide	Abe, Tange	3:53
8.	"Hey! I've Got a Feeling"	Hashimoto	Yasui, Hashimoto	7:31
9.	"In the Air"	Tange, Koide	Abe, Tange	4:05
10.	"Far Away"	Tange, Koide	Abe, Tange	5:32
Total length:				44:50

== Personnel ==
- Naoki Hashimoto – vocals
- Yosuke Abe – guitars
- Yoshihiro Yasui – bass
- Shinya Tange – drums

=== Additional ===
- Lisa Reuter - Cello (track 10)
- Elin Sydhagen - Viola (track 10)

== Charts ==
Chart (2013)	Peak position
Japanese Albums (Oricon)	32
