= SS (band) =

Japanese hardcore punk band

- Origin: Kyoto, Japan
- Genres: Japanese hardcore
- Label: Alchemy Records
- Members: Tommy SS; Jun SS; Tsuyoshi SS; Takami SS

SS was a Japanese punk rock band formed in 1977 in Kyoto, Japan. The band were a part of the Kansai no wave scene, and later regarded as the first Japanese hardcore punk band. The band formed for the sole purpose of making music that was faster than the Ramones.

SS consisted of Tommy SS on vocals, Jun SS on guitar, Tsuyoshi SS on bass, and Takami SS on drums. The entire recorded output of SS consisted of two live albums, both released years after the performances that they immortalized took place: The Original SS, recorded in March 1979, released on vinyl in 1984; and SS Live!, recorded in June 1979, released on CD in 1990. Both albums were remastered and released together on a single CD, also titled SS Live!, in 2001.

The vast majority of the songs on both albums are less than a minute long, with only a single track clocking in at more than two minutes. Most of the songs on these albums are originals, except for covers of "Blitzkrieg Bop" by The Ramones (played at both performances) and "First Time" by The Boys. Both songs were played faster than the original version.

== Discography ==
=== Archival albums ===
- The Original SS Alchemy Records (ARLP-002), 1984
- SS Live! Alchemy Records (ARCD-0014), 1990
- SS Live! (both albums, remastered) Alchemy Records (ARCD-129), 2001

Compilation albums

- (VHS) Rockers (July 1, 1989)
- (DVD) ROCKERS (July 3, 2009)

3. Mr. Twist / 15. Coca-Cola (Live at Shimokitazawa Loft, Dec 31st 1978)
