= Making the Road =

- North American cover

Studio album by Hi-Standard
- Released: June 30, 1999
- Studios: Echo House Studio, Tokyo, Japan
- Genre: Punk rock
- Length: 37:39
- Label: Pizza of Death
- Producer: Hi-Standard

Hi-Standard chronology
Angry Fist (1997)	Making the Road (1999)	Love Is a Battlefield (2001)

Making the Road is the third album by the Japanese punk rock band Hi-Standard. Recorded in their native country, it was released on June 30, 1999, by Pizza of Death Records. Fat Wreck Chords released it in North America in November 1999. The album has sold more than 650,000 copies.

The cover art is a screenshot from the finale of Akira Kurosawa's Yojimbo.

== Critical reception ==
Professional ratings
Review scores
Source	Rating
AllMusic	4/5 stars
Punknews.org	1/5 stars
The Spokesman-Review	A

The Spokesman-Review wrote that the album "delivers fast, gritty punk while, at the same time, incorporating violins, violas and cellos."

== Track listing ==
- All songs written by Hi-Standard.
1. "Turning Back" – 0:33
2. "Standing Still" – 2:12
3. "Teenagers are All Assholes" – 2:00
4. "Just Rock" – 1:04
5. "Dear My Friends" – 3:12
6. "Stay Gold" – 2:00
7. "No Heroes" – 2:10
8. "Glory" – 1:50
9. "Please, Please, Please" – 2:30
10. "Green Acres" – 0:54 (1960s TV Theme)
11. "Changes" – 2:43 (Black Sabbath cover)
12. "Making the Road Blues" – 1:15
13. "Crows" – 1:52
14. "Tinkerbell Hates Goatees" – 1:26
15. "Pentax" – 0:34
16. "Nothing" – 2:51
17. "Starry Night" – 2:12
18. "Brand New Sunset" – 3:24
19. "Sexy Girlfriend" (hidden track) – 2:57

== Personnel ==
- Akihiro Nanba – vocals, bass
- Ken Yokoyama – guitar, vocals
- Akira Tsuneoka – drums
- Recorded at Echo House Studio, Tokyo, Japan
- Produced by Hi-Standard
- Engineered by Osamu Seino
