= Blind Ride =

Studio album by Hibria
- Released: January 26, 2011
- Recorded: Hibria Studios, Imagem Sonora
- Genre: Heavy metal, power metal
- Length: 45:25
- Label: King Records
- Producer: Diego Kasper

Hibria chronology
The Skull Collectors (2008)	Blind Ride (2011)

Blind Ride is Hibria's third album, released in 2011.

== Track listing ==
All songs performed by Abel Camargo, Diego Kasper, Iuri Sanson, Eduardo Baldo, Benhur Lima

No.	Title	Length
1.	"Blind Ride" (Intro)	0:42
2.	"Nonconforming Minds"	4:31
3.	"Welcome to the Horror Show"	3:42
4.	"Shoot Me Down"	4:00
5.	"Blinded by Faith"	4:33
6.	"The Shelter's on Fire"	4:56
7.	"Beyond Regrets of the Past"	4:08
8.	"I Feel No Bliss"	4:13
9.	"Sight of Blindness"	4:35
10.	"Tough Is the Way"	4:12
11.	"Rotten Souls"	4:59
12.	"I'm Gonna Live Till I Die" (Frank Sinatra cover – Japanese bonus track)	2:54
Total length:		45:25

== Personnel ==
- Iuri Sanson – vocals
- Diego Kasper – guitars
- Abel Camargo – guitars
- Benhur Lima – bass
- Eduardo Baldo – drums
- Additional backing vocals: Benhur Lima ("Nonconforming Minds", "Tough Is The Way")

== Production ==
- Mixed and mastered at Machine Shop – New York/USA by William Putney
- Vocals and drums recorded at Imagem Sonora – Porto Alegre/Brazil by Carlos Loureiro and Juliano
- Guitars and bass guitar recorded at Hibria Studios, reamped at Machine Shop
- Cover art and booklet by Gustavo Sazes. 3D modeling by Diego Kasper
- Band picture by Guto Maahs
