= Pizza of Death Records =

Japanese record label

- Parent company: Toy's Factory (1994–?); Howling Bull (?–1999)
- Founded: 1994
- Founder: Ken Yokoyama
- Distributor: Toy's Factory
- Genre: Punk rock
- Country of origin: Japan
- Location: Tokyo, Japan
- Official website: http://www.pizzaofdeath.com/

Pizza of Death is a Japanese record label founded in Tokyo in 1994 by Hi-Standard guitarist Ken Yokoyama. It was created as a record label inside a larger record label, Toy's Factory. Pizza of Death then switched to under the Howling Bull label, before establishing itself as fully independent in 1999 with the release of Hi-Standard's Making the Road. The label currently holds 22 bands, 5 of which are based in The United States and Europe. One of these is Me First and the Gimme Gimmes, which is associated with several well-known American punk musicians from the United States, including producer and bassist Fat Mike of NOFX.

Toy's Factory currently distributes this label.

== Current bands ==
Japanese bands:

- Water Closet
- Comeback my Daughters
- Moga the 5
- Toast
- BBQ CHICKENS
- Hawaiian6
- Razors Edge
- The Genbaku Onanies
- Ken Yokoyama
- Asparagus
- Slimeball
- Upper
- F.I.B.
- Garlic boys
- WANIMA
- Suspended 4th
- Sabasister

North American and European bands:

- Me First and the Gimme Gimmes
- Good Riddance
- Venerea
- Satanic Surfers
- Snuff

== Compilations ==
- The Best New-Comer Of The Year
- The Very Best of Pizza of Death I
- The Very Best of Pizza of Death II
- Have a Slice of Death
