= Love Is a Battlefield (EP) =

EP by Hi-Standard
- Released: July 24, 2001
- Genre: Punk rock, pop punk
- Length: 8:16
- Label: Fat Wreck Chords
- Producer: Hi-Standard

Hi-Standard chronology
Making the Road (1999)	Love Is a Battlefield (2001)	The Gift (2017)

Love Is a Battlefield is a four-track EP from Japanese punk rock band, Hi-Standard. It was released on American label, Fat Wreck Chords, in July 2001.

== Track listing ==
- All songs written by Hi-Standard, except #2 written by Toshiharu Jitsukawa and #4 written by George David Weiss, Hugo Peretti and Luigi Creatore.
1. "This Is Love" – 1:19
2. "My First Kiss" – 3:11
3. "Catch a Wave" – 1:02
4. "Can't Help Falling in Love" – 2:44

== Personnel ==
- Akihiro Nanba – vocals, bass
- Ken Yokoyama – guitar, vocals
- Akira Tsuneoka – drums
- Produced by Hi-Standard
- Engineered by Osamu Seino
- Mixed by Ryan Greene
