= Hi-Standard =

Japanese punk rock band

- Origin: Japan
- Genres: Melodic hardcore; punk rock; hardcore punk; pop punk
- Years active: 1991–2000, 2011–present
- Labels: Toy's Factory; Pizza of Death; Fat Wreck Chords
- Members: Akihiro Nanba; Ken Yokoyama; Zax
- Past members: Atsuhiko Matsumoto; Akira Tsuneoka
- Website: hi-standard.jp

Hi-Standard (stylized as Hi-STANDARD) is a Japanese punk rock band formed in 1991 by bassist and lead vocalist Akihiro Nanba, guitarist and vocalist Ken Yokoyama, and drummer Akira Tsuneoka. The release Making the Road sparked sold-out Japan shows and U.S./European tours with punk bands such as NOFX, No Use for a Name, and Wizo. Although the members of Hi-Standard are Japanese, all of their major releases are sung in English. Tsuneoka died in February 2023, and former Pay Money to My Pain drummer Zax joined the band in September 2025. In 2003, Hi-Standard was ranked by HMV at number 64 on their list of the 100 most important Japanese pop acts.

== History ==
=== Formation and success: 1991–2000 ===
Forming in August 1991 as a four-piece band, the initial lineup of Hi-Standard contained lead vocalist Atsuhiko Matsumoto, bassist Akihiro Nanba, guitarist Ken Yokoyama, and drummer Akira Tsuneoka. They had their first concert that October at Kōenji 20000V in Kōenji, Tokyo. Shortly after recording their first demo tape in 1992, Matsumoto left the group in September, with bassist Nanba taking over vocal duties, solidifying Hi-Standard's lineup as a power trio. They provided the song "Selfish Girl" to the November 1992 omnibus album Shake a Move, and two tracks to the 1993 live omnibus BQ Jap.

In 1994, Hi-Standard contributed two songs to the live omnibus Sokobi Jūatsu Hachiwari Pull Up from the Underground 80% and released their debut mini-album Last of Sunny Day. It was released on their own record label, Pizza of Death Records. Three months later, they released a 7" titled "In the Brightly Moonlight", and embarked on numerous tours across Japan throughout the mid-90s. In April 1994, Hi-Standard opened for its first international touring act, L7 at Ebisu Guilty.

In January 1995, the band performed with The Offspring and toured with Garlic Boys. A Japanese tour with NOFX followed in May. That August, Hi-Standard traveled to America to record their first full-length LP. Growing Up was produced by NOFX member Fat Mike and released by Toy's Factory that November. 1996 saw the band accompany Green Day on a Japanese tour in January, and Rancid on a tour of Japan in February. When Growing Up was released in North America by Fat Wreck Chords, Hi-Standard held a tour of the US and Canada in March 1996.

In May 1997, their second full-length album, Angry Fist, was released, selling 500,000 copies worldwide. In 1998, Hi-Standard and NOFX embarked on a US/Canada tour. Over the following months, they participated in the 1998 Warped Tour, headlined the '98 Air Jam to an audience of 30,000, and once again joined NOFX on a European tour.

Riding the wave of successes from their prior albums and touring, they released their third album, Making the Road, in 1999. It sold over one million copies.

=== Hiatus: 2000–2011 ===
After recording five albums, Hi-Standard entered a hiatus in August 2000, shortly after playing Air Jam 2000. Guitarist Ken Yokoyama began working on other projects, including solo work in a similar vein to Hi-Standard, as well as exploring a more traditional hardcore punk style with BBQ Chickens, fronted by longtime friend and artist, Daisuke Hongolian, who provided artwork for some of Hi-Standard's early releases. Yokoyama revisited the band's original label Pizza of Death Records, which has since signed many punk and alternative rock bands. Bassist Akihiro Nanba's newest project is Ultra Brain. According to CDJapan, Nanba proclaims their debut album, Neo Punk, to be the birth of neo-punk. Akira Tsuneoka provided the drums for the group Cubismo Grafico Five.

=== Reformation and Tsuneoka's death: 2011–present ===
In 2011, it was announced that Hi-Standard would be reforming. The band played at 'Air Jam 2011', and 'Air Jam 2012', and headlined the Japanese edition of Fat Wreck Chords' 25th-anniversary show in Tokyo in November 2015. The single "Another Starting Line" was released on October 5, 2016 with no preceding PR campaign, and available exclusively in stores. In 2017, they released The Gift, their first album in over 15 years.

Akira Tsuneoka died suddenly on February 14, 2023, at the age of 51. Later that month, Nanba and Yokoyama announced they would continue the band. Hi-Standard released the digital single "I'm a Rat", which features Tsuneoka, on April 19. Following Tsuneoka's death, the band secretly held auditions for a new drummer and reviewed hundreds of videos by applicants. With former Pay Money to My Pain drummer Zax as a support member, Hi-Standard supported NOFX on the latter's final Japanese tour in 2024. On September 24, 2025, they announced that Zax had joined officially joined the band and that the mini-album Screaming Newborn Baby will be released on November 26.

== Band members ==
- Akihiro Nanba (難波章浩) – lead vocals, bass (1991–2000, 2011–present)
- Ken Yokoyama (横山健) – guitar, backing vocals (1991–2000, 2011–present)
- Zax – drums (2025–present, touring 2024-2025)

Former members

- Atsuhiko Matsumoto (松本敦彦) – lead vocals (1991–1992)
- Akira Tsuneoka (恒岡章) – drums (1991–2000, 2011–2023; his death)

== Discography ==
=== Studio albums ===
Year	Title	Label
1994	Last of Sunny Day	Pizza of Death
1995	Growing Up	Toy's Factory, Fat Wreck Chords
1997	Angry Fist	Toy's Factory, Fat Wreck Chords
1999	Making the Road	Pizza of Death, Fat Wreck Chords
2017	The Gift	Pizza of Death
2025	Screaming Newborn Baby	

=== Singles ===
Year	Title	Label	Notes
1994	"In the Brightly Moonlight"	Snuffy Smile	7" vinyl
1996	"California Dreamin'"	Fat Wreck Chords	Overseas release
1996	"The Kids Are Alright"	Toy's Factory	
1997	"I Don't Need Trouble Because of... Money"	Pizza of Death	7" vinyl
1997	"Weihnachten Stinkt!"	Hulk Räckorz	Overseas release, Split with Wizo
1997	"War is Over"	Pizza of Death	7" vinyl
2000	"Love Is a Battlefield"	Pizza of Death	
2016	"Another Starting Line"	Pizza of Death	
2016	"Vintage & New, Gift Shits"	Pizza of Death	
2023	"I'm a Rat"	Pizza of Death	Digital only

=== Other albums ===
Year	Title	Label	Notes
2020	Live at Yokohama Arena 20181222	Pizza of Death	Live album, streaming only

=== Music videos ===
- Maximum Overdrive
- New Life
- Growing Up
- The Sound of Secret Minds
- The Kids Are Alright
- Endless Trip
- Brand New Sunset
- Stay Gold
- Teenagers Are All Assholes
- Another Starting Line
- All Generations
