= Growing Up (Hi-Standard album) =

- North American cover

Studio album by Hi-Standard
- Released: November 1, 1995
- Recorded: August 2–15, 1995
- Genre: Punk rock
- Length: 32:47
- Label: Toy's Factory
- Producer: Fat Mike; Ryan Greene; Hi-Standard

Hi-Standard chronology
Last of Sunny Day (1994)	Growing Up (1995)	Angry Fist (1997)

Professional ratings
Review scores
Source	Rating
Allmusic	4.5/5 stars

Growing Up is the first full-length studio album by Japanese punk rock band Hi-Standard. It was released by Toy's Factory in November 1995. Fat Wreck Chords released the album in North America in February 1996. According to Fat Mike in a 2015 interview with CBC, it sold 700,000 copies during the heyday of Fat Wreck Chords in the late nineties.

== Track Listing [1996, Fat Wreck Chords] ==
- All songs written by Hi-Standard, unless otherwise stated.
1. "Summer of Love" – 1:47
2. "Wait for the Sun" – 2:18
3. "Who'll Be the Next" – 2:46
4. "Lonely" – 2:24
5. "Saturday Night" (Coulter, Martin) – 2:06
6. "I'm Walkin'" – 2:07
7. "Maximum Overdrive" – 2:43
8. "Growing Up" – 2:00
9. "Tell Me Something, Happy News" – 2:02
10. "New Life" – 1:46
11. "Since You Been Gone" (Ballard) – 2:06
12. "Kiss Me Again" – 2:24
13. "Sunny Day" – 3:06
14. "In the Brightly Moonlight" – 3:12

== Track Listing [1995, Toy's Factory] ==
- All songs written by Hi-Standard, unless otherwise stated.
1. "Maximum Overdrive" – 2:37
2. "Lonely" – 2:23
3. "Summer of Love" – 1:47
4. "Since You Been Gone" (Ballard) – 2:06
5. "Wait For The Sun" – 2:18
6. "Tell Me Something, Happy News" – 2:02
7. "Groovy Crew" – 1:42
8. "Saturday Night" (Coulter, Martin) – 2:06
9. "California Dreamin'" (Michelle Phillips) – 2:18
10. "Selfish Girl" – 1:40
11. "I'm Walkin'" – 2:07
12. "New Life" – 1:46
13. "Kiss Me Again" – 2:25
14. "In the Brightly Moonlight" – 3:12
15. "Growing Up" – 2:08

== Personnel ==
- Akihiro Nanba – vocals, bass
- Ken Yokoyama – guitar, vocals
- Akira Tsuneoka – drums
- Morty Okin – trumpet
- Lars Nylander – horn, trombone
- Gerry Lundquist – trombone
- Skankin' Pickle – trumpet
- Recorded between August 2–15, 1995
- Produced by Fat Mike, Ryan Greene, and Hi-Standard
- Engineered by Ryan Greene

== Certifications and sales ==
Region	Certification	Certified units/sales
Japan	—	350,000
Worldwide	—	500,000
