= The Skull Collectors =

Studio album by Hibria
- Released: December 12, 2008
- Recorded: Studio 1000, Gemini Studios
- Genres: Speed metal, power metal, heavy metal
- Length: 53.01
- Label: Remedy Records
- Producers: Diego Kasper and Marco Panichi

Hibria chronology
Defying the Rules (2004)	The Skull Collectors (2008)	Blind Ride (2011)

Professional ratings
Review scores
Source	Rating
The Metal Crypt	4/5 stars
Metal-Temple	4.5/5 stars
Metal Invader	4/5 stars

The Skull Collectors is Hibria's second album, released in Japan in late 2008 and America in February 2009.

== Track listing ==
All songs composed and performed by Abel Camargo, Diego Kasper, Iuri Sanson and Marco Panichi; lyrics by Marco Panichi

1. "Tiger Punch" – 4:14
2. "Reborn from the Ashes" – 4:50
3. "Screaming Ghost" – 5:15
4. "Sea of Revenge" – 4:42
5. "The Anger Inside" – 4:53
6. "Devoted to Your Fear" – 6:40
7. "The Skull Collectors" – 5:15
8. "Burning All the Flags" – 5:12
9. "Wings of Wax" – 8:37

== Personnnel ==
- Iuri Sanson – vocals
- Diego Kasper – guitars
- Abel Camargo – guitars
- Marco Panichi – bass
- Eduardo Baldo – drums

== Production ==
- Vocals and drums recorded at Estudio 1000 – Porto Alegre/Brasil by Fábio Lentino
- Guitars, bass and synths recorded at Gemini Studios – Porto Alegre/Brasil by Diego Kasper
- Mixed and mastered at Indiscreet Audio Studios – Ostfildern/Germany by Achim Kohler
- Produced by Diego Kasper and Marco Panichi

== Note ==
"Screaming Ghost" (demo version) is not present on all versions of the album.
