= United (band) =

Japanese thrash metal band

- Origin: Tokyo, Japan
- Genres: Thrash metal; groove metal; death metal; progressive metal
- Years active: 1981–present
- Labels: Hold Up, Howling Bull, Metal Blade, Victor Entertainment, Spiritual Beast, 413 Tracks
- Members: Yoshifumi "Hally" Yoshida; Shingo Otani; Akira Tominaga; Masatoshi Yuasa; George Enda
- Past members: Oz; Yasu Tsukahara; Kouichi "Nao"; Takeshi "Mantas" Nakazato; Tetsuo "Tetsu" Takizawa; Masaki "Marchan" Hara; Iwao Furusawa; Yoshiaki Furui; Hirokazu Uchino; Shinichi Inazu; Yusuke Nakamura; Nobu; Faisal "Kenshin" Al-Salem; Akihiro Yokoyama
- Website: united-official.com

United is a Japanese thrash metal band formed in 1981. They have had many personnel changes in their four-decade career. No member of the original lineup remains. Bassist Akihiro Yokoyama joined in 1983, became the band leader in 1988, and appeared on every recording until his death in 2014. Guitarist Yoshifumi "Hally" Yoshida joined United in 1988, and is currently the longest-serving member. He and guitarist Shingo Otani, who joined in 1990, are the only two members to have performed on all 10 studio albums. Yuichi Masukawa of Headbang magazine called United one of the "Four Heavenly Kings of Japanese Thrash", alongside Doom, Casbah and Jurassic Jade.

== History ==
United is named after the Judas Priest's song of the same name. Originally a Judas Priest and Black Sabbath cover band, they began to write original material in 1983, when bassist Yokoyama joined. United have played numerous times in North America, and have released a couple of albums there as well. They have played with Anthrax, Slayer, Testament and Machine Head on their Japanese tours, and, in 2010, they were Paul Di'Anno's live band.

In 2009, the group recruited Kuwaiti frontman Kenshin. They released their ninth album, Tear of Illusions, on April 20, 2011. At the end of 2012, the band announced that Kenshin had left the group. Masatoshi Yuasa, who was their frontman from 2000 to 2004, returned as vocalist in April 2013. The band's longest-serving member, bassist and manager Akihiro Yokoyama, died on May 13, 2014. The Yoko Fest The Final concert was held in his honor on September 12, 2014, featuring nearly every former and current member of United, and other bands such as Head Phones President, Passpo, Garlic Boys, Flow, and Outrage. United released their tenth studio album, Absurdity, on July 18, 2018.

== Members ==
Current members

- Yoshifumi "Hally" Yoshida – guitar (1988–present)
- Shingo Otani – guitar (1990–present)
- Akira Tominaga – drums (2004–present)
- Masatoshi Yuasa – vocals (2000–2004, 2013–present)
- George Enda – bass (2014–present)

Former members

- Oz – bass (1981–1983)
- Yasu Tsukahara – drums (1981–1983)
- Nao – vocals (1981–1986; died 2017)
- Takeshi "Mantas" Nakazato – guitar (1981–1987)
- Masaki "Marchan" Hara – guitar (1981–1988)
- Tetsuo "Tetsu" Takizawa – drums (1983–1988)
- Iwao Furusawa – guitar (1987–1990)
- Yoshiaki Furui – vocals (1986–1995)
- Yuichi Uchino – drums (1988–1998)
- Shinichi Inazu – vocals (1996–2000)
- Yusuke Nakamura – drums (1999–2003)
- Nobu – vocals (2005–2008)
- Faisal "Ken-Shin" Al-Salem – vocals (2009–2013)
- Akihiro Yokoyama – bass (1983–2014; died 2014)

== Discography ==
=== Studio albums ===
Title	Release date	Label
Bloody But Unbowed	October 14, 1990	Howling Bull
Human Zoo	September 26, 1992	Howling Bull
N.O.I.Q.	February 8, 1995	Victor Entertainment
Reload	February 5, 1997	Victor Entertainment
Distorted Vision	April 22, 1999	Victor Entertainment
Infectious Hazard	April 4, 2001	Howling Bull
Core	August 7, 2002	Howling Bull
Nine	December 21, 2005	Howling Bull
Tear of Illusions	April 20, 2011	Spiritual Beast
Absurdity	July 18, 2018	Spiritual Beast

=== EPs ===
- Destroy Metal (February 1985, picture disc vinyl in February 1987)
- Beast Dominate (December 1986, picture disc vinyl in April 1987)
- Beast Dominates '92 (1992)
- Burst (May 2, 1997)

=== Other albums ===
- Best Rare Tracks from Underground (March 24, 1995, compilation album)
- Scars of the Wasted Years (April 4, 2012, self-cover album)

=== Demo ===
- "Demo '89" (January 1990)

=== V/A Compilations ===
- Devil Must Be Driven Out with Devil (1986, "Positive War" & "Bite Yourself")
- Emergency Express – Metal Warning 2 (1989, "Suck Your Bone")
- Flower Travellin' Band Tribute (September 20, 2000, "Make Up")
- Tribute to Bad Brains (November 29, 2000, "Riot Squad – How Low Can a Punk Get?")
- Beast Feast Admission (August 2, 2001, "Cross Over the Line")
- Power Germanys (April 27, 2002)
- Enter the Beast Feast (April 27, 2004, "Sonic Sublime")
- Beast Feast Admission 2K2 (December 17, 2002, "Hate Yourself, Hate Your Own Kind")
- Tribute to Garlic Boys (August 18, 2006, "Skate & Mosh")
- 44Magnum Tribute Album (April 2, 2008, "It's Too Bad")

=== DVD ===
- Official Bootleg (September 27, 2008)
