= Wanima =

Japanese musical group

WANIMA
- Origin: Kumamoto, Japan
- Genres: Punk rock; pop punk; hard rock; emo,Skapunk, Melodic Hardcore,Reggae.
- Years active: 2010–present
- Label: Pizza of Death Records
- Members: Kenta; Ko-shin; Fuji
- Website: http://wanima.net/

WANIMA (ワニマ, Wanima) is a Japanese punk rock band from Kumamoto, Japan that formed in 2010. They were signed to Pizza of Death Records in 2014.

On August 25, 2021, it was announced all three members tested positive for COVID-19.

== Members ==
=== Kenta ===
- Name: Kenta Matsumoto (松本健太)
- Birth date: April 13, 1988 (age 38)
- Birthplace: Amakusa, Kumamoto
- Position: Vocalist, Bassist

=== Ko-shin ===
- Name: Koushin Nishida (西田光真)
- Birth date: March 30, 1989 (age 37)
- Birthplace: Amakusa, Kumamoto
- Position: Guitarist, Chorus

=== Fuji ===
- Name: Kouki Fujiwara (藤原弘樹)
- Birth date: August 8, 1986 (age 40)
- Birthplace: Kumamoto
- Position: Drums, Chorus

== Discography ==
=== Albums ===
Year	Album details	Oricon chart
2014	Can Not Behaved!!: 1st mini-album; Released: October 22, 2014; Catalog no.: PZCA-69	21
2015	Are You Coming?: 1st studio album; Released: November 4, 2015; Catalog no.: PZCA-76	4
2018	Everybody!!: 1st major debut album; Released: January 17, 2018; Catalog no.: WPCL-12817	1
2019	Cominatcha!!: Released: October 23, 2019	1
2020	Cheddar Flavor: Released: September 23, 2020	2
2023	Catch Up • Released: October 10, 2023	5
2026	Excuse Error • Released: 25 March 2026|/	

=== EPs ===
Year	EP details	Oricon chart
2019	Summer Trap!!: Released: July 17, 2019	
2022	"Aiyaiya" with Mongol800: Released: June 22, 2022	
2024	"Aiyaiya 2" with Mongol800: Released: September 25, 2024	

=== Singles ===
Year	Title	Oricon chart
2015	"Think That...": Released: August 5, 2015; Catalog no.: PZCA-72	14
2016	"Juice Up!!": Released: August 3, 2016; Catalog no.: PZCA-78	4
2017	"Gotta Go!!": Released: May 17, 2017; Catalog no.: WPCL-12663	3
2019	"Gong"	

=== DVDs ===
Year	Title	Oricon chart
2017	JUICE UP!! TOUR FINAL: Released: June 28, 2017; Catalog no.: WPBL-90438/9	1

== Awards and nominations ==
MTV Video Music Awards Japan

Year	Nominee / work	Award	Result
2017	"Charm"	Best Rock Video	Won
