= Defying the Rules =

Studio album by Hibria
- Released: November 28, 2004
- Recorded: Studio 1000
- Genres: Speed metal, power metal
- Length: 52:01
- Label: Remedy Records
- Producers: Diego Kasper and Marco Panichi

Hibria chronology
Defying the Rules (2004)	The Skull Collectors (2008)

Professional ratings
Review scores
Source	Rating
AllMusic	3.5/5 stars
Sputnikmusic	4.5/5 stars
Sea of Tranquility	4.5/5 stars
AbsolutePunk.net	9/10 stars

Defying the Rules is Hibria's first album, released in 2004. It tells the story of a dystopian future, ruled over by the 'Faceless in Charge' and group of rebels, such as the 'Steel Lord' battling against his forces for a free world.

== Track listing ==
1. "Intro" – 1:56
2. "Steel Lord on Wheels" – 3:54
3. "Change Your Life Line" – 4:25
4. "Millennium Quest" – 6:51
5. "A Kingdom to Share" – 5:37
6. "Living Under Ice" – 3:45
7. "Defying the Rules" – 5:49
8. "The Faceless in Charge" – 6:58
9. "High Speed Breakout" – 5:01
10. "Stare at Yourself" – 7:45
11. "Hard Ride" – 3:48 (Pantera cover) (Japanese reissue only)
12. "Painted Skies" – 5:14 (Crimson Glory cover) (Japanese reissue only)

== Personnel ==
- Iuri Sanson – vocals
- Diego Kasper – guitars, synth programming
- Abel Camargo – guitars
- Marco Panichi – bass
- Savio Sordi – drums
- Piet Sielck – mixing and mastering

== Note ==
The instrumental Intro track is not present on all versions of the album.
