= Danger music =

Avant-garde music and performance art

- Stylistic origins: Noise; avant-garde; experimental; Fluxus; performance art
- Cultural origins: 1960s, Fluxus
- Typical instruments: Various highly dangerous objects

Local scenes
- Japan

Other topics
- Hardcore punk; noise rock; industrial music; powerviolence

Danger music is an experimental form of avant-garde 20th- and 21st-century music and performance art. It is based on the concept that some pieces of music can or will harm either the listener or the performer, understanding that the piece in question may or may not be performed. Kyle Gann describes in his book Music Downtown: Writings from the Village Voice how Takehisa Kosugi's composition Music for a Revolution directs the performer to "scoop out one of your eyes 5 years from now and do the same with the other eye 5 years later." Works such as this are also sometimes referred to as anti-music because they seem to rebel against the concept of music itself. Danger music is often closely associated with the Fluxus school of composition, especially the work of Dick Higgins, who composed a series of works entitled Danger Music.

== In performance ==
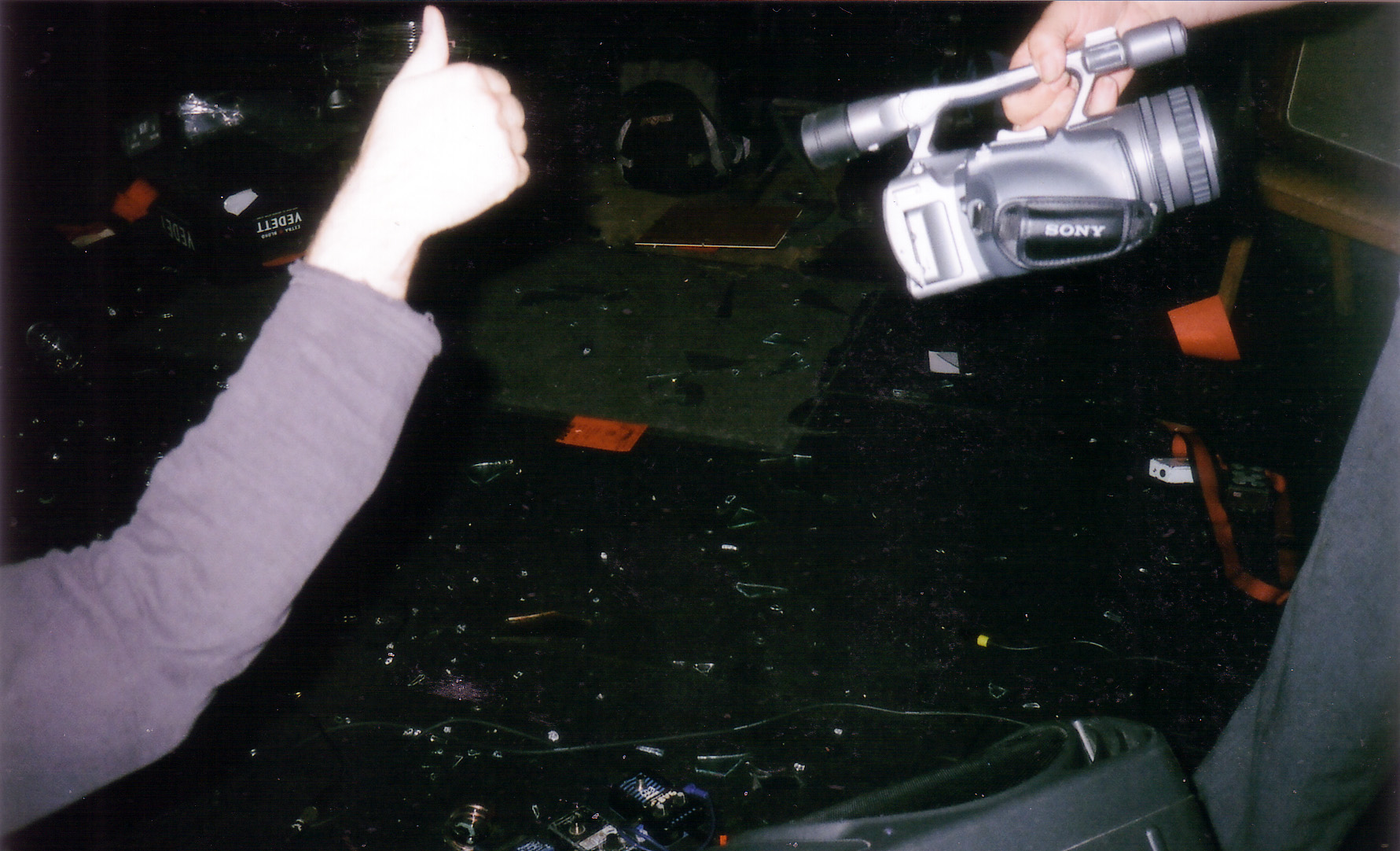
Broken glass strews the stage after a show by Australian noise musician Justice Yeldham. Yeldham plays an instrument made of glass, often shattering it during live shows and receiving facial wounds in the process.

As with many forms of concept music and performance art, the lines drawn between tapestries such as "music", "art", "theater", and "social protest" are not always clear or apparent. Danger music consequently has some things in common with the performance art of artists such as Mark Pauline and Chris Burden. For instance, some extreme examples of danger music direct performers to use sounds so loud that they will deafen the participants, or ask performers to throw anti-personnel bombs into the audience.

Japanese musician Yamantaka Eye's noise project Hanatarash was notable for its dangerous live shows, the most famous instance being when the Japanese artist drove an excavator through the venue at the back of the stage. There were also reports of audience members being required to fill out waivers before shows to prevent the band or the venue being sued in case of any harm caused to them. Punk metal band G.I.S.M., another Japanese act, reportedly featured violent live shows in regards to the band's frontman, Sakevi, who would perform a variety of dangerous stunts including running toward the crowd with a chainsaw, attacking front rows with a lit flamethrower, throwing fireworks at the crowd or fighting random concertgoers.

Other pieces involve more symbolic forms of "danger", such as Nam June Paik's "Danger Music for Dick Higgins," which directs the performer to "creep into the vagina of a living whale."

== See also ==
- Sonic weapon
- 20th-century classical music
- Contemporary music
- Experimental music
