= Gauze (band) =

Japanese hardcore punk band

- Origin: Japan
- Genre: Hardcore punk
- Years active: 1981–2022
- Members: Fugu: vocals Momorin: Guitars; Shin: Bass; Hiko: Drums

Gauze was a Japanese hardcore punk band formed in September 1981. Having released five albums as well as appearing on numerous compilations since their formation, the band has had a major impact on the Japanese hardcore punk scene.

== History ==
Gauze was formed in the autumn of 1981.

According to Gauze's bassist, Shin, their initial goal was to play as fast as possible. They attempted to give the impression of playing fast without actually playing fast.

The first Gauze recordings are the tracks from the 1982 City Rocker compilation LP, which featured 10 of their songs. Their debut album, Fuck Heads, was released June 1985. Shortly after, they recorded Equalizing Distort, which was released in March 1986. They released the Genkai Wa Doko Da ("What’s the Limit?") LP in 1989, and in 1991 they played a 10th anniversary gig, where they played three sets covering the 3 periods they had gone through in the previous 10 years. They played 51 songs over these 3 sets. In 1996, they began a US tour, though it lasted just three shows - a fourth was scheduled, but was cancelled. They played at Gilman St. in Berkeley, at the Bomb Shelter in Minneapolis and in Chicago at the Fireside Bowl. They also recorded songs for a 7" that came out on Prank a little after this, while they were in SF.

As of 2006, Gauze performed a live version of every album they recorded. They used older instruments to replicate the sounds from previous albums. As of 2019, they have started touring Japan again.

The band dissolved in November 2022.

== Albums ==
- Fuckheads 12" LP (1985)
- Equalizing Distort 12" LP (1986)
- Genkai wa Doko da (限界は何処だ, Where's the Limit; 12" LP) (1989)
- Low Charge 7" EP (1996) on Prank Records
- Kao o Aratte Denaoshite Koi (面を洗って出直して来い, Wash Your Face and Come Back Again) (1997)
- Binbou Yusuri no Rizumu ni Notte (貧乏ゆすりのリズムに乗って, Ride the Fidgety Rhythm; LP 12") (2007)
- 言いたかねえけど目糞鼻糞 CD on XXX Records (2021)

== External links and references ==
- Gauze's home page
- Gauze's setlist and discography
- A Biography
