= Garlic Boys =

Japanese punk rock band

Garlicboys
- Origin: Osaka, Japan
- Genres: Punk rock, hardcore punk, thrash metal, alternative rock
- Years active: 1985–2014, 2017–present
- Labels: Captain, Archemy, Epic, Sony, Rotten Orange, Pizza of Death
- Members: Peta; Larry; Ryo; Pessin
- Past members: Koba♥Young; Kyo
- Website: garlicboys.net

Garlicboys is a Japanese punk band from Osaka. The current lineup is Peta (lead vocals), Larry (guitar, vocals), Pessin (bass, vocals) and Ryo (drums, vocals). They are known in Japan's "trendy" underground music scene as the "godfathers of new school Japanese hardcore".

== History ==
Garlicboys formed in 1985, and after releasing thrash demos such as Garlic Bomber and Garlicboys, they released their first EP Ninniku Night in 1988 and their thrash metal debut album Psycho Thrash in 1991. The release of Psycho Thrash brought them great success. They released Poem next, which brought a heavier sound to the Garlicboys. The band toured with acts such as D.R.I. and Exodus. The band also performed in the United States with acts such as NOFX, Sick of It All, All You Can Eat, H_{2}O, Madball, Youth Brigade, Propagandhi, Hi-Standard, Lagwagon, Face to Face, Strung Out, Gas Huffer, and the Offspring. The Garlicboys also toured with German band Die Ärzte on their European tour. In 2000, the Garlic Boys then released Mushroom Cut and Duffle Coat, a "pop punk" song from their album of the same name. Their most recent release is Ten, released in 2004, which showcases their ability to play melodic punk rock with obvious influence from speed metal.

== Sound ==
The Garlicboys have a sound that has evolved over the years and crossed many genres. In the beginning, they had a thrash punk sound which stayed consistent until they released Declaration of Narcissism. Their sound became more of a hardcore punk sound. During their years with Love and Mushroom Cut and Duffle Coat they had obvious pop influences on their extremely melodic music. Some of their songs have a joking tone, while others are very heavy and dark. Peta's singing ranges from yelling to high pitch screaming over shredding guitar or grunge style music. On some songs, harmonious singing accompanies the pop-influenced music.

=== Discography ===
- Garlic Bomber (1985)
- Garlic Boys (1986)
- Ninniku Night (1988)
- King of Smell (1989)
- Smegmania (1990)
- Yokozuna (1990)
- Garlic Boys E.P. (1990) (Also known rarely as 'Public Bath')
- Psycho Thrash (1991)
- Alchemy Best (1992)
- Garlicholic (1992)
- ナルシスト宣言 (Declaration of Narcissism) (1993)
- ハッスル (Hustle) (1995)
- ビンビンジロー (Bin Bin Jiro) (1996)
- Poem (1996)
- Love (1997)
- マッシュルームカットとダッフルコート (Mushroom Cut to Duffle Coat) (2000)
- Golden Hits (2000)
- Death Match (2001)
- ロマン (Roman) (2001)
- Recycle (2002)
- 十 (Ten) (2004)
- 群青 (Gunjyo) (2006)
- 激情 (Gekijyo) (2008)
- 実録 Live 2006–2007 (Jitsuroku) (2008)
- 再録ベスト (Sairoku Best) (2011)
