= G.I.S.M. =

Japanese metal/hardcore punk band

- Origin: Tokyo, Japan
- Genres: Hardcore punk; heavy metal; danger music
- Years active: 1981–2002, 2016–2022
- Members: Kiichi Takahashi; Ironfist Tatsushima
- Past members: Sakevi Yokoyama "Cloudy"; Hiroshima; Kaori Komura; Mario; Randy Uchida; Souichi Hisatake

G.I.S.M. (ギズム, Gizumu) was a Japanese punk metal band formed in Tokyo in 1981. Although the group's guitar style resembles heavy metal in many aspects, G.I.S.M. was primarily linked to the punk scene, and is credited as one of the very first Japanese hardcore bands. The group also drew influence from the early industrial/avant-garde music, which was atypical at the time for both punk rock and metal acts alike.

The acronym G.I.S.M. has many different variations, including "God In The Schizoid Mind," "Guerrilla Incendiary Sabotage Mutineer," "General Imperialism Social Murder," "Gnostic Idiosyncrasy Sonic Militant," and "Guy Individual Social Mean".

G.I.S.M. came to be widely known in the global punk scene after the song “Endless Blockades for the Pussyfooter” appeared on International P.E.A.C.E. Benefit Compilation 1984. Thereafter, the band attained something of a cult status in the international punk scene, duly for their unique blend of heavy metal and hardcore punk. Roadrunner Records ranked Sakevi Yokoyama No. 49 out of 50 of The Greatest Metal Frontmen of All Time.

== Biography ==
=== Career ===
G.I.S.M. had their first performance in 1981 at the University of Tokyo.

In 1984, G.I.S.M. released their first album, titled Detestation, on Dogma Records. The album has been applauded for having unique vocals and a guitar style that was very uncommon in hardcore punk.

M.A.N., or Military Affairs Neurotic, was released in 1987 on Beast Arts Records. The album was quite a departure from the 'Detestation' album, putting more emphasis on a slower, metal style of music compared to the hardcore punk sound of the previous release.

G.I.S.M. released their last album on compact disc, titled SoniCRIME TheRapy, in 2001. The band featured Kiichi Takahashi on bass and Ironfist Tatsushima on drums. Guitarist Randy Uchida died from cancer on 10 February 2001, shortly after the release of the album. G.I.S.M. played two shows in Tokyo in honor of Randy Uchida, and then broke up.

In 2002, G.I.S.M. made the cover of Burst Magazine (issue No. 49), an underground Japanese magazine.

G.I.S.M. performed in the Netherlands on 15 April 2016 at Lee Dorian's Roadburn event. It was their first performance after a 13-year hiatus, along with being their first show outside of Japan.

=== Members and other projects ===
Sakevi Yokoyama continued to make collage art with his own clothing brand "stlTH", which made T-shirt designs until his death in late 2023. In 1987, he made a cameo appearance in the Japanese film Robinson's Garden. In the movie, he attacks a Rastafarian man for teaching children spirituality. This film is the only documentation of his "acting" career. In 2004, Sakevi released a solo album titled The War under the name S.K.V. In 2006, he designed the artwork for World Burns To Death's album titled Totalitarian Sodomy.

Randy Uchida (guitarist) and Tohru Hiroshima (drummer) played with Ronny Wakamats and Michel Hammer in a side project called R.U.G. (Randy Uchida Group), which released one vinyl EP titled “Deathly Fighter” in 1984. Uchida died of cancer in 2001, and Hiroshima in 2022.

Kiichi Takahashi (bassist) was the vocalist for the occult heavy metal band Sabbrabells.

Cloudy (original bassist) played bass for female-fronted speed metal band Front Guerrilla, which released an EP titled Fight Back in 1986.

Ironfist Tatushima (drummer) continues to play in the bands Die You Bastard! and Crow, which he had been playing with prior to G.I.S.M.

Kaori Komura (original drummer) is an improviser using Korean percussion. She released a duo CD with Kazumoto Endo titled "In The Cave" in 2020.

Frontman Sakevi Yokoyama died on 24 August 2023.

== P.O.W. magazine ==
During the mid 80s, Sakevi published a Japanese punkzine titled P.O.W. The acronym of P.O.W. initially stood for Punk On Wave, but then changed to Performance Of War for the third, final issue. The magazine promoted local punk bands from the Tokyo scene at the time. Sakevi also personally interviewed the Tokyo Medical Examiners Office, wrote the P.L.O., and wrote prisoners of war from Anti Japanese Armed Fronts by asking them all their opinions on death, included vivid instructions on different ways to kill people and showed vivid drawings on how ABC weapons are made with images of their horrific consequences. John Duncan, the guest-editor for the magazine, stated in the introduction of the first issue that Sakevi attacked a salaryman for staring with a makeshift flamethrower on a Tokyo commuter train, and attacked the manager of a rental video shop subsequently landing him in prison for two months.

== Discography ==
=== LPs ===
- Detestation (1984) Dogma Records
- M.A.N. (Military Affairs Neurotic) (1987) Beast Arts

=== CDs ===
- DETESTation (1992) Beast Arts
- SoniCRIME TheRapy (2002) Beast Arts

=== Compilation appearances ===
- Outsider LP (1982, City Rocker) Tracks: "Incest", "Gash, Bite, Snatch", "AAHB"
- Great Punk Hits LP (1983, Japan Records) Tracks: "Death Exclamations", "Fire"
- Hardcore Unlawful Assembly LP (1984, AA records) Tracks: "Still Alive", "Nervous Corps"
- International P.E.A.C.E. Benefit Compilation 2x LP (1984, R Radical records) Track: "Endless Blockads for the Pussyfooter"
- The Punx cassette tape (1985, JICC) Tracks: "Shoot to Kill (for epileptic soldier)", "G.I.S.M."
- Determination (2015) Beast Arts

=== Videos ===
- "Performance" (1985) Beast Arts
- "BOOTLEG 1986" (1986) Beast Arts
- "Gay Individual Social Mean - Subj & Egos, chopped" (1995) Beast Arts
- "+R, Regicide Reverberation" (2002) Beast Arts
- "烈波壊虐音群突入911" (2024) Beast Arts
