= Hibria =

Brazilian heavy metal band

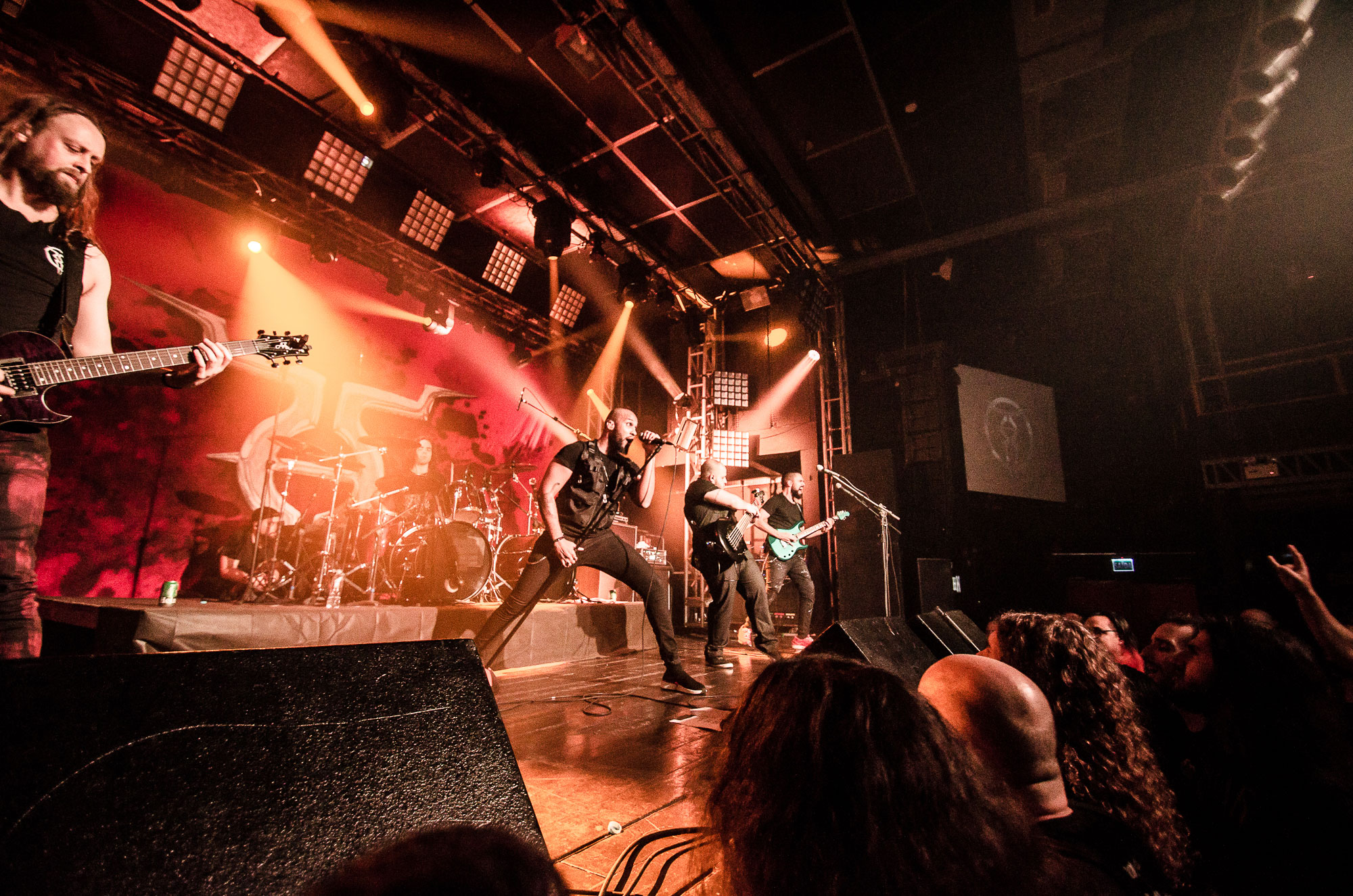
- Hibria live in Porto Alegre, December 2019, at Bar Opinião

Background information
- Origin: Porto Alegre, Brazil
- Genres: Power metal; speed metal
- Years active: 1996–present
- Labels: King Records; Remedy Records
- Members: Abel Camargo; Vicente Telles; Ângelo Parisotto; Tiago Assis; William Schuck
- Past members: Savio Sordi; Marco Panichi; Diego Kasper; Iuri Sanson; Eduardo Baldo; Benhur Lima; Renato Osorio; Ivan Beck; Guga Munhoz; Martin Estevez; Alexandre Panta; Victor Emeka; Bruno Godinho; Otávio Quiroga; Thiago Baumgartem
- Website: hibria.com

Hibria (stylised in all caps) is a Brazilian power metal band, known for their technicality and speed. The band cites influences from traditional metal bands such as Iron Maiden and Judas Priest, thrash bands such as Metallica and Megadeth, and progressive bands such as Dream Theater.

Hibria toured across Europe in 1999, in the "Against the Faceless" demo tour, playing 29 concerts through Belgium, Germany, Netherlands, Czech Republic, and Poland. The band was on the roster to perform at ProgPower USA XVI in September 2015, which would have been their first time performing in the United States. However, they were not allowed into the country and did not get to perform. In December 2017, it was announced that Iuri Sanson, Eduardo Baldo, Renato Osorio, and Ivan Beck would be leaving the band. One more release titled Moving Ground, featuring this lineup, was released in February 2018 in Japan.

== Band members ==
=== Current lineup ===
- Abel Camargo – guitars (1996–present)
- Vicente Telles – guitars (2022–present)
- Ângelo Parisotto – vocals (2025–present)
- Tiago Assis – bass (2025–present)
- William Schuck – drums (2025–present)

=== Former members ===
- Savio Sordi – drums (1996–2005)
- Marco Panichi – bass (1996–2010)
- Diego Kasper – guitars (1996–2012)
- Iuri Sanson – vocals (1996–2017)
- Eduardo Baldo – drums (2005–2017)
- Benhur Lima – bass (2010–2016)
- Renato Osorio – guitars (2012–2017)
- Ivan Beck – bass (2016–2017)
- Guga Munhoz – guitars (2018)
- Martin Estevez – drums (2018)
- Victor Emeka – vocals (2018–2024)
- Alexandre Panta – bass (2019–2021)
- Bruno Godinho – guitars (2019–2022)
- Otávio Quiroga – drums (2019–2024)
- Thiago Baumgartem – bass (2021–2024)

== Discography ==
=== Albums ===
Name	Year	Mixed by	Produced by
Defying the Rules (#148 Japanese charts)	2004	Piet Sielck – Powerhouse (Germany)	Diego Kasper, Marco Panichi
The Skull Collectors (#62 Japanese charts)	2008	Achim Koehler – Indiscreet (Germany)	Diego Kasper, Marco Panichi
Blind Ride (#37 Japanese charts)	2011	Willam Putney – The Machine Shop (U.S.)	Diego Kasper
Silent Revenge (#63 Japanese charts)	2013	Benhur Lima – HIBRIA Studios (Brazil)	Renato Osorio
Defying the Rules: 10th Anniversary	2014		
Hibria	2015		
Moving Ground	2018		
Me7amorphosis	2022		
On the Shortness of Life	2026		

=== Demos ===
- 1997 – Metal Heart (demo)
- 1999 – Against the Faceless (demo)

== Videography ==
Song	Album	Released in
"Shoot Me Down"	Blind Ride	2011
"Tiger Punch"	The Skull Collectors	2009
"Steel Lord on Wheels"	Defying the Rules	2005
