= BBQ Chickens =

Japanese band

- Origin: Japan
- Genres: Hardcore punk; thrashcore; crossover thrash
- Years active: 2000-present
- Label: Pizza of Death Records
- Members: Ken Yokoyama; Andrew; Iso; Hongolian
- Past members: Hatano

BBQ Chickens (often stylized as BBQ CHICKENS) is a Japanese hardcore punk band, created in 2000 by former Hi-Standard member Ken Yokoyama. All four members have been "buddies since childhood", and convened to form the band when Ken announced the hiatus of Hi-Standard. Since their beginning, they have released five studio albums, and have enjoyed unexpected success in different forms. Their first album, Indie Rock Strikes Back, sold upwards of 85,000 copies and rocketed them onto the Japanese punk scene, where they played several sold out shows. BBQ Chickens later won the award for "Best Alternative Video" during the 2002 Space Shower Music Video Awards for their video "Sick Guy/Stupid Magazine", and the year after with "Pizza of Death's Theme/Fat Boy". BBQ Chickens' third album, Fine Songs, Playing Sucks, was a cover album, and was noted by the idea that it was a "selection of most unusual songs to cover."

== Discography ==
Year	Title	Label
2001	Indie Rock Strikes Back	Pizza of Death
2002	Goodbye to your Punk Rock	Pizza of Death
2003	Fine Songs, Playing Sucks	Pizza of Death
2011	Crossover and Over	Pizza of Death
2013	Broken Bubbles	Pizza of Death

== Members ==
- Hongolian – vocals (2000–present)
- Ken Yokoyama – guitar, backing vocals (2000–present)
- Iso – bass (2000–present)
- Andrew – drums (2009–present)

== See also ==
- Hi-Standard
- Pizza of Death Records
