= Gastunk =

Japanese rock band

- Also known as: Gastank
- Origin: Tokyo, Japan
- Genres: Hard rock; heavy metal; hardcore punk
- Years active: 1983–1988, 1999 & 2006, 2010–present
- Labels: Love; Dogma; Vice; BMG Victor; Teichiku; Savanna Kitchen; Mad Indian; Wins; Pusmort (US); Edison (UK)
- Members: Baby; Tatsu; Maruo
- Past members: Naoki; Yutaka; Matsumura; Pazz; Baki; Kei; Motokatsu
- Website: gastunk.com

Gastunk (stylized as GASTUNK and sometimes spelled GASTANK) is an influential Japanese rock band, first active from 1983 to 1988. Initially a hardcore punk band, guitarist Tatsu later recalled that when Gastunk made their major label debut they were dubbed heavy metal by the media. They reunited for one-off concerts in 1999 and 2006, before fully restarting activities in 2010.

== History ==
=== Formation and disbandment: 1983–1988 ===
Gastunk was formed in January 1983 by former The Execute bassist Baby. He coined the name from the gas tanks located on Kanpachi-dori Avenue, near his home in Nerima, Tokyo. With Baby acting as bassist and vocalist, the initial lineup featured two members of The Comes; guitarist Naoki and drummer Matsumura. However, the early years of the band experienced a rotating lineup of musicians. This included vocalist Yutaka, who was the bassist in Dead Cops under the name "Otakevi" and later frontman of White Heaven as "You Ishihara". Gastunk contributed three songs to the 1984 Holdup Omnibus compilation. The lineup for the compilation featured Matsumura credited as "Kill" and Dead Cops guitarist Tatsu, who was still in high school. Baki, former vocalist of Lip Cream and The Execute, who also took over Baby's bass position in the latter, then joined Gastunk as frontman in November 1984.

With its first stable lineup of Baby, Matsumura, Tatsu and Baki, Gastunk released a self-titled EP on Dogma Records in February 1985. It was followed by their first album, Dead Song, in August. That month saw Gastunk appear on the NHK TV show Indies no Shūrai, and perform at an event sponsored by Takarajimasha. They ended the year by releasing the single "Mr. Gazime" on December 24, 1985, on their own record label, Love Records. In 1986, the band released the single "Geronimo" in March and the EP The Vanishing Signs in May. They also contributed two songs to the compilation album A Farewell to Arms, which received a European release by Nuclear Blast Records the following year. From July to August, Gastunk held the 23-date Heartful Melody Four Islands Tour, during which they gave out the free, three-track EP To Fans, which contains re-recordings of previously released songs. At Indies Festival 1986, held at Hibiya Open-Air Concert Hall in September, Matsumura destroyed his drum kit at the end of their set and quit Gastunk. After holding auditions, Pazz joined as the band's new drummer. In December, Gastunk released the compilation Three Sex X'mas, which is composed of three, 7-inch solo records by Baby, Tatsu and Baki, and a flexi disc of "In the Fire" recorded with Pazz.

The band's second studio album Under the Sun was released on June 21, 1987, and features a cover created by Tadanori Yokoo. It marked their major label debut as it was released by Vice, a subsidiary of Nippon Crown. That same day, they performed at Indies Festival 1987 at Hibiya Open-Air Concert Hall, where their performance was briefly halted to have the audience back away from the stage, as a fatal accident had happened at the same venue just two months earlier. Three of Gastunk's songs from the concert were included on a live compilation album and concert video of the event. A different mix of Under the Sun, with all English lyrics and a new cover by Pushead, was released internationally in November on the Pusmort record label.

Gastunk recorded their third album, June 1988's Mother, in Los Angeles. The album's tour began in July, took them to 22 locations, and included their first solo hall concert at Nakano Sun Plaza, which was recorded and released as the Revelation home video. At the Street Fighting Men event at MZA Ariake on November 12, 1988, the band suddenly announced that they would be disbanding. Music writer Kazuhiko Namekawa cited Baby's move to America as the main reason for the breakup. With their name spelled "GASTANK", the band released the EP Midnight Rain in November and the single "Sunshine of Your Love" in December. Gastunk held their farewell concert at Shibuya Public Hall on December 22, 1988. In February 1989, a re-recording of "Dead Song" from April 1988 was included as a flexi disc in a special issue of Rockin' f magazine that covered the Street Fighting Men event. A live recording of their last concert, titled The End, was released as a live album on February 21, 1989, and as a two-volume home video on March 21.

=== Reunions ===
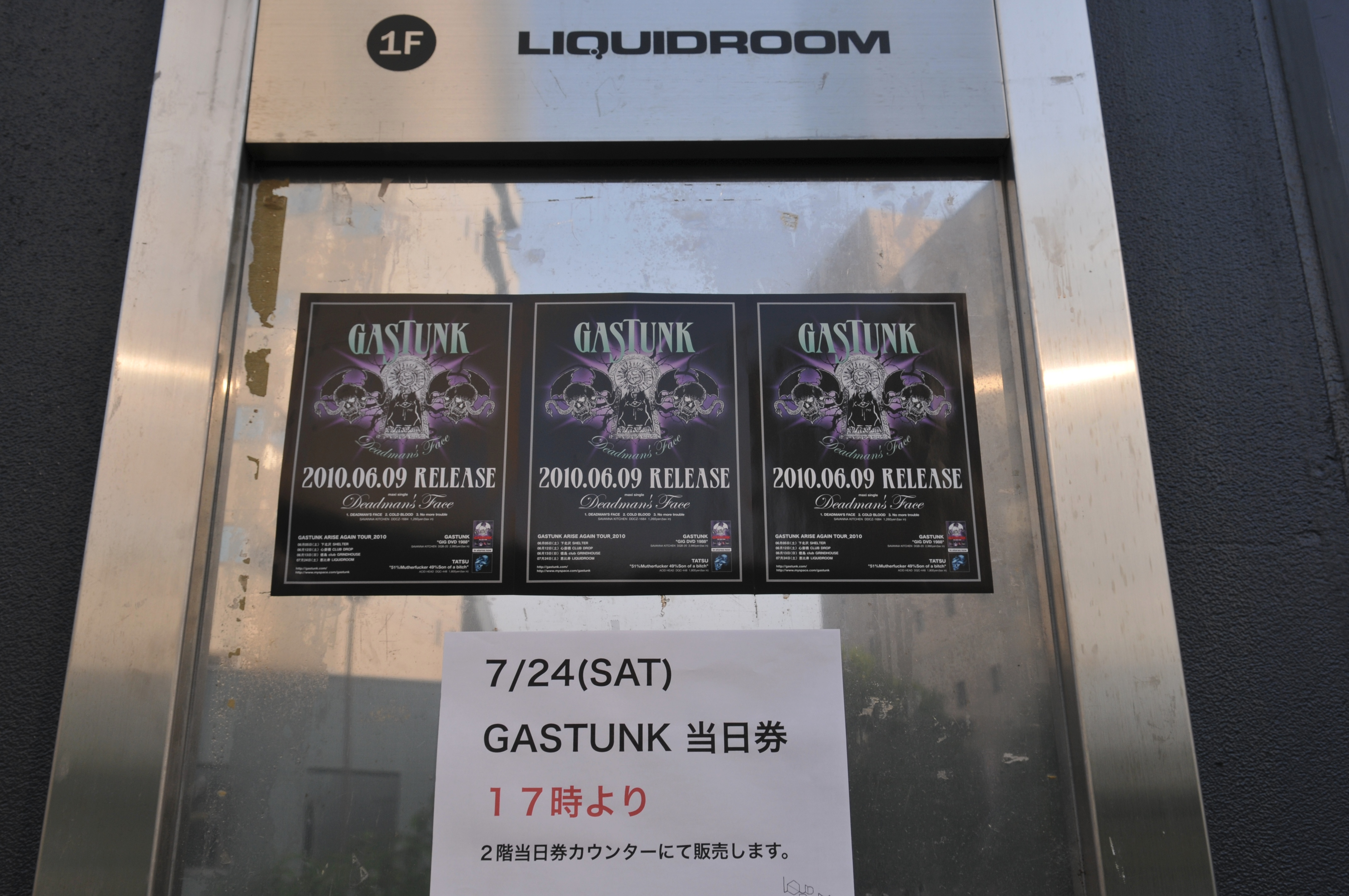
Gastunk posters outside Ebisu LiquidRoom (2010)

In November 1992, Tatsu, Baki and Matsumura reunited with Minoru of The Comes on bass to perform at Shinjuku Antiknock, in memory of Ghoul vocalist Masami, who died two months earlier. In January 1999, Baby, Tatsu, Baki and Pazz reunited as Gastunk for a concert at Akasaka Blitz called Rest in Peace, in memory of Hide, who died the previous year. It was recorded and released as a live album in November of that year, and later as a DVD in 2005.

Gastunk performed again in 2006 at an event commemorating the 30th anniversary of Shinjuku Loft, before officially restarting activities in January 2010. They released the three-track single "Deadman's Face" on June 9 as their first new material in 22 years. Drummer Pazz, who joined Gastunk in 1986, left the band in September 2019. He was replaced by Tatsu's The Deadrocks bandmate Kei in August 2020. Gastunk released Vintage Spirit, The Fact, their first album in 33 years, on June 9, 2021. On August 31, 2022, the band announced that vocalist Baki, who first joined in 1984, had suddenly decided to leave Gastunk. The remaining three members cancelled four scheduled shows as a result, but stated that they will continue activities. On August 7, 2023, it was announced that Kei had left the band in March due to various circumstances, that he was replaced by former The Mad Capsule Markets drummer Motokatsu Miyagami, and that Gastunk was in the studio recording new material.

The new lineup, featuring Baby and Tatsu sharing vocal duties, had its first concerts on November 30 and December 1, 2024. The album The Greatest Swell followed on December 11. However, in February 2025, Motokatsu announced he would be leaving Gastunk after their March 15 concert. He would later state that he was not paid for his two years in the band and found nothing enjoyable about the experience, but had joined to help out his friends. Gastunk had their first concert with new drummer Maruo at Shinjuku Samurai on December 5.

== Influence ==
Gastunk have been labeled the originators of mixing metal and punk music. They have also been noted for their visual aesthetics coinciding with visual kei, with Baki wearing white face paint inspired by Kiss and Tatsu having red hair.

Musicians such as Hide, Kiyoharu, Hyde, Hakuei of Penicillin and Kyo of Dir en Grey have cited Gastunk as an influence or expressed admiration for them. Morrie cited how Baki alternated between distorted and clean vocals from one song to the next as influencing him in establishing his own vocal style. Early in his career, Aki of Laputa imitated Gastunk's use of difficult or uncommon kanji in lyrics.

== Members ==
Current members

- Baby – bass, vocals 1983–1988, 1999, 2006, 2010–present (The Execute, The Highest Region, Rebel Tribe)
- Tatsuya "Tatsu" Shinozaki (篠崎辰也) – guitar, vocals 1983–1988, 1999, 2006, 2010–present (Dead Cops, Jacks 'n' Joker, The Eye Scream, The Killing Red Addiction, Punktronica, The Deadrocks)
- Kazumasa Maruo (丸尾和正) – drums 2025–present (Clingon)

Former members

- Naoki – guitar 1983 (The Comes, Lip Cream) Died 2021
- Yutaka – vocals 1983–1984 (Dead Cops as "Otakevi")
- Matsumura a.k.a. "Kill" – drums 1983–1986 (The Comes)
- Shigeru "Pazz" Kobayashi – drums 1986–1988, 1999, 2006, 2010–2019 (Z.O.A., Doom, Quartergate, I love you... OK?)
- Masahiko "Baki" Isowaki (磯脇雅彦) – vocals 1984–1988, 1999, 2006, 2010–2022 (Lip Cream, The Execute, Joy, Quartergate, No. 9, Mosquito Spiral)
- Kei – drums 2020–2023 (The Jacks, The Deadrocks)
- Motokatsu Miyagami (宮上元克) – drums 2023–2025 (The Mad Capsule Markets, Ace of Spades)

== Discography ==
=== Studio albums ===
- Dead Song (August 1985)
- Under the Sun (June 21, 1987; US version, November 1987)
- Mother (June 21, 1988)
- Vintage Spirit, The Fact (June 9, 2021), Oricon Albums Chart Peak Position: No. 24
- The Greatest Swell (December 11, 2024)

=== EPs ===
- Gastunk (February 1985)
- The Vanishing Signs (May 1, 1986)
- To Fans (July 1986)
- Midnight Rain (November 18, 1988), No. 82

=== Singles ===
- "Mr. Gazime" (December 1985)
- "Geronimo" (March 30, 1986)
- "Counter-Clock Wise" (June 1988)
- "Sunshine of Your Love" (December 16, 1988) Oricon Singles Chart Peak Position: No. 85
- "Dead Song" (February 1989, included in Rockin'f magazine)
- "Deadman's Face" (June 9, 2010) No. 128

=== Live albums ===
- The End (February 21, 1989) No. 82
- Rest in Peace (March 25, 1999)
- Live at Loft 2011 (limited cassette, 2018)

=== Compilation albums ===
- Heartful Melody 1983–1988 (1994)
- Early Singles (August 21, 2002)

=== Home videos ===
- Smash the Wall (VHS: February 1988, DVD: February 20, 2004)
- Revelation (VHS: September 1988, DVD: November 15, 2006)
- The End Vol. 1 (March 21, 1989)
- The End Vol. 2 (March 21, 1989)
- The End Vol. 1 & 2 (March 25, 2004)
- Rest in Peace (February 23, 2005)
- Gig DVD 1987 (November 8, 2006)
- Double Gigs (August 6, 2008)
- Gig DVD 1988 (April 21, 2010)
- Arise Again Tour 2010 (November 17, 2010)
- The Running Mad Blood in a Dead Indian's Dream! (2 DVDs & 1 CD, February 6, 2019) Oricon DVDs Chart Peak Position: No. 54
