= Avant-garde music =

Music genre

Avant-garde
- Stylistic origins: Modernism; classical; romanticism; expressionism
- Cultural origins: Early-to-mid 20th century
- Derivative forms: Experimental music (pop, rock, metal, jazz, funk, hip-hop): industrial; post-punk; art rock; free jazz; drone; no wave; Outsider music; danger music; progressive; synth-pop

Other topics
- Musique concrète

Avant-garde music is music that is considered to be at the forefront of innovation in its field, with the term avant-garde implying a critique of existing aesthetic conventions, rejection of the status quo in favor of unique or original elements, and the idea of deliberately challenging or alienating audiences. Avant-garde music may be distinguished from experimental music by the way it adopts an extreme position within a certain tradition, whereas experimental music lies outside tradition.

== Distinctions ==
The biggest distinction between avant-garde and experimental music was how it relates to tradition. Other distinctions include subject matter, as well as having a superficial idea to avoid diving into serious subjects. Even though avant-garde and experimental music have many distinctions, experimental music and avant-garde music also have similarities due to experimental music being referred to as the "contemporary avant-garde" which is in relation to the electronic style of music being the forefront of many compositions in the 1960s and 1970s.

In a historical sense, some musicologists use the term "avant-garde music" for the radical compositions that succeeded the death of Anton Webern in 1945, but others disagree. For example, Ryan Minor writes that this period began with the work of Richard Wagner, whereas Edward Lowinsky cites Josquin des Prez. The term may also be used to refer to any post-1945 tendency of modernist music not definable as experimental music, though sometimes including a type of experimental music characterized by the rejection of tonality. A commonly cited example of avant-garde music is John Cage's 4'33" (1952), a piece which instructs the performer(s) not to play their instrument(s) during its entire duration. The piece has been described as "not a musical 'work' in the normal sense, only an occasion for a Zen-like meditation".

Although some modernist music is also avant-garde, a distinction can be made between the two categories. According to scholar Larry Sitsky, because the purpose of avant-garde music is necessarily political, social, and cultural critique, so that it challenges social and artistic values by provoking or goading audiences, composers such as Igor Stravinsky, Richard Strauss, Arnold Schoenberg, Anton Webern, George Antheil, and Claude Debussy may reasonably be considered to have been avant-gardists in their early works (which were understood as provocative, whether or not the composers intended them that way), but Sitsky does not consider the label appropriate for their later music. For example, modernists of the post–World War II period, such as Milton Babbitt, Luciano Berio, Elliott Carter, György Ligeti, and Witold Lutosławski, never conceived their music for the purpose of goading an audience and cannot, therefore, be classified as avant-garde. Composers such as John Cage and Harry Partch, on the contrary, remained avant-gardists throughout their creative careers.

A prominent feature of avant-garde music is to break through various rules and regulations of traditional culture, in order to transcend established creative principles and appreciation habits. Avant-garde music pursues novelty in musical form and style, insisting that art is above everything else; thus, it creates a transcendental and mysterious sound world. Hint, metaphor, symbol, association, imagery, synesthesia and perception are widely used in avant-garde music techniques to excavate the mystery of human heart and the flow of consciousness, so that many seemingly unrelated but essentially very important events interweave into multi-level structures and forms.

== Popular music ==
Popular music, by definition, is designed for mass appeal. The 1960s saw a wave of avant-garde experimentation in jazz, represented by artists such as Ornette Coleman, Sun Ra, Albert Ayler, Archie Shepp, John Coltrane and Miles Davis. In the rock music of the 1970s, the "art" descriptor was generally understood to mean "aggressively avant-garde" or "pretentiously progressive". Post-punk artists from the late 1970s rejected traditional rock sensibilities in favor of an avant-garde aesthetic. In 1988, the writer Greg Tate described hip-hop as "the only avant-garde around, still delivering the shock of the new". The Beatles song "Revolution 9" is one of the most popular examples of avant-garde inspired pieces in popular music. It is the penultimate track to their 1968 album The Beatles (also known as The White Album).

== See also ==
- Lo-fi
- Danger music
- Industrial music
- Lowercase music

Contemporary/classical music

- Aleatoric music
- Free improvisation
- Indeterminacy in music
- Noise music
- Surrealist music

Popular/traditional music

- Art pop
- Art punk
- Art rock
- Avant-funk
- Avant-garde jazz
- Avant-garde metal
- Avant-prog
- Avant-pop
- Experimental pop
- Experimental rock
