= Cocobat =

Japanese metal band

- Origin: Japan
- Genres: Groove metal, alternative metal, nu metal
- Years active: 1991–present
- Labels: Sinkie, Toy's Factory, Carnage
- Members: Take-Shit; Hideki; Kame; Koji
- Past members: Ryuji; Suzuki Shinichi; Matsuzaki; Tomoda; Murochin

Cocobat is a Japanese heavy metal band, named after Bobo Brazil's finishing move Coco Butt. The band formed in 1991 with four members: bassist Take-Shit, vocalist Ryuji, guitarist Suzuki Shinichi and drummer Matsuzaki. Their first album, Cocobat Crunch, was released in April 1992 on the indie label Sinkie. In August, the band released a second album, titled Struggle of Aphrodite and began a tour of Japan with a number of other bands.

In 1993, Cocobat switched to Toy's Factory and re-released its original album under this label. Subsequently, the band underwent a series of changes in its line-up. Of the four original members, two left in December 1993, leaving only Take-Shit and Ryuji. 1994 saw the arrival of two new members–Tomoda (guitar) and Murochin (drums)–and the departure of Ryuji following the release of Foot Prints in the Sky. After releasing a fourth album, Posi-Traction, the band dispersed in 1995, leaving Take-Shit as the only remaining member. Cocobat reformed in December 1996 with the addition of three new members–Hideki (vocals), Kame (drums) and Koji (guitar)–and released a fifth album titled Return of Grasshopper.

== Discography ==
=== CD ===
- Cocobat Crunch (1993)
- Struggle of Aphrodite (1993/re-released 1999)
- Foot Prints in the Sky (1994)
- Posi-Traction (1995)
- Return of Grasshopper (1996)
- Tsukiookami (1998)
- I versus I (1999)
- Supercharged Chocolate Meltdown (2001)
- Ghost Tree Giant (2001)
- Hammerslave-History 10×20 (2002)
- Fireant Moving Co. (2004)
- 12 Steps (2005)
- Searching for Change (2009)

=== DVD ===
- A Tourist Guide to Cocobat + Michael Brown (2004)
  - Tracks 1-17 taken from A Tourists Guide to Cocobat
  - Tracks 18-30 taken from Michael Brown
