= Discotheque Play Like "A" Rainbows =

Discotheque play like "A" Rainbows -enter&exit-

Live album by Alice Nine
- Released: October 29, 2008 (Japan)
- Recorded: 2008
- Genre: Pop rock
- Labels: King Records; PS Company

Alice Nine chronology
Alpha (2007)	Discotheque play like "A" Rainbows -enter&exit- (2008)

Discotheque play like "A" Rainbows -enter&exit- is a live tour DVD by visual kei rock band Alice Nine. It was filmed on their DISCOTHEQUE play like "A" RAINBOWS tour and released on October 29, 2008.

== Track list ==
All tracks are written by Alice Nine.

No.	Title	Length
1.	"Opening"
2.	"Rainbows"
3.	"Zero"
4.	"Hana Ichi Monme (華一匁)"
5.	"White Prayer"
6.	"Kowloon-Nine Heads Rodeo Show- (九龍; Nine Dragons)"
7.	"-Dice-"
8.	"9th Revolver"
9.	"Kouchouran (胡蝶蘭; Butterfly Orchid)"
10.	"Eraser (イレイザー)"
11.	"Red Carpet Going On"
12.	"Haikara Naru Rondo"
13.	"Gokusai Gokusyoku Gokudouka [G3]"
14.	"Velvet"
15.	"Mirror Ball piano ver."
16.	"Drums solo"
17.	"The Last Empire"
18.	"Strawberry Fuzz (ストロベリー ファズ)"
19.	"Follow Me"
20.	"Heisei Jyuushichinen Shichigatsu Nanoka (平成十七年七月七日; Seventh Day of the Seventh Month of the Seventeenth Year of the Emperor's Reign)"

Bonus. Shunkashuutou

== Credits ==
- Alice Nine
  - Nao – drums
  - Tora – guitar
  - Hiroto – lead guitar
  - Saga – bass, backing vocals
  - Shou – vocals
