= Gin no tsuki kuroi hoshi =

"Gin no Tsuki, Kuroi Hoshi"

Single by Alice Nine
- Released: March 30, 2005
- Genre: Alternative rock, pop rock
- Label: PS Company, King

Alice Nine singles chronology
"Namae wa, Mada Nai" (2004)	"Gin no Tsuki, Kuroi Hoshi" (2005)	"Yami ni Chiru Sakura" (2005)

Gin no Tsuki, Kuroi Hoshi (銀の月 黒い星) is the second maxi single by Japanese band Alice Nine on March 30, 2005. The single was released with a DVD containing the music video for "Gin no Tsuki, Kuroi Hoshi." The title translates to "Silver moon, black star." The songle peaked at number 45 on Oricon Singles Chart.

Both songs on the single were later released on Alice Nine's third EP, Kasou Musou Shi.

== Track listing ==
1. "Gin no Tsuki, Kuroi Hoshi" (銀の月 黒い星; Silver Moon, Black Star) – 4:38
2. "Kousai Stripe" (光彩ストライプ; Stripe of Brilliance) – 4:53

=== DVD ===
1. "Gin no Tsuki, Kuroi Hoshi" (銀の月 黒い星; Silver Moon, Black Star)
