= Akatsuki/Ikuoku no Chandelier =

Single by Alice Nine
- Released: February 22, 2006
- Genre: Pop rock, alternative rock
- Length: 16:01
- Label: PS Company, King Records
- Songwriter(s): Alice Nine

Alice Nine singles chronology
"Fantasy" (2006)	"Akatsuki/Ikuoku no Chandelier" (2006)	"Blue Planet" / "Number Six" (2006)

"Akatsuki/Ikuoku no Chandelier" ("暁/幾億のシャンデリア; Dawn/Many Millions of Chandeliers") is a double A-side single released by rock band Alice Nine. Its release coincided with the release of another single, "Fantasy". "Akatsuki" and "Ikuoku no Chandelier" were used as the opening and closing themes, respectively, for the second season of anime series Meine Liebe. The single came in two versions, one regular edition which only came as a CD and a special edition which had a music video for "Akatsuki".

== Track listing ==
No.	Title	Writer(s)	Length
1.	"Akatsuki" (暁 "Dawn")	Alice Nine	3:33
2.	"Ikuoku no CHANDELIER" (幾億のシャンデリア "Many Millions of Chandeliers")	Alice Nine	4:29
3.	"Akatsuki (instrumental)" (暁 "Dawn" (instrumental))	Alice Nine	3:34
4.	"Ikuoku no CHANDELIER (instrumental)" (幾億のシャンデリア "Many Millions of Chandeliers" (instrumental))	Alice Nine	4:28
5.	"Akatsuki (music video; Special edition only)" (暁 "Dawn" (music video; Special edition only))	Alice Nine
