= Vandalize (album) =

Studio album by Alice Nine
- Released: January 14, 2009
- Recorded: October–December 2008
- Genre: Power pop; alternative rock
- Label: King Records; PS Company

Alice Nine chronology
| Alpha (2007) | Vandalize (2009) | Gemini (2011) |

Singles from Vandalize
- 1. "Mirror Ball" Released: March 26, 2008; 2. "Rainbows" Released: August 6, 2008; 3. "Cross Game" Released: December 10, 2008

Vandalize is the third studio album from visual kei rock band Alice Nine. It was released on January 19, 2009. The album contains fourteen tracks, compiling the band's three previous singles ("Mirror Ball", "Rainbows", and "Cross Game") and eight new songs. The album was released in two versions: a regular edition, and a limited edition of the album, which includes a DVD that features live footage, a promotional music video for "the beautiful name," and a special package design. The album debuted on the Oricon Chart with a #3 daily and a #7 weekly, with total sales of 13,198 recorded.

== Track listing ==
Disc one (CD)

1. "the beautiful name"
2. "Hyakka Ryōran" (百花繚乱; Many Flowers Blooming Profusely)
3. "Rainbows"
4. "Kiss twice, Kiss me deadly"
5. "Cross Game"
6. "Subaru" (昴; Pleiades)
7. "www."
8. "Drella"
9. "Mirror Ball (Vandalize Edition)"
10. "Innocence" (イノセンス)
11. "Waterfall"
12. "Inconsistence"
13. "Your face"
14. "bail game"

Disc two (DVD, limited edition only)

1. "the beautiful name" music video
2. making of "the beautiful name"
3. Inconsistence
