= Alice Nine =

Japanese visual kei rock band

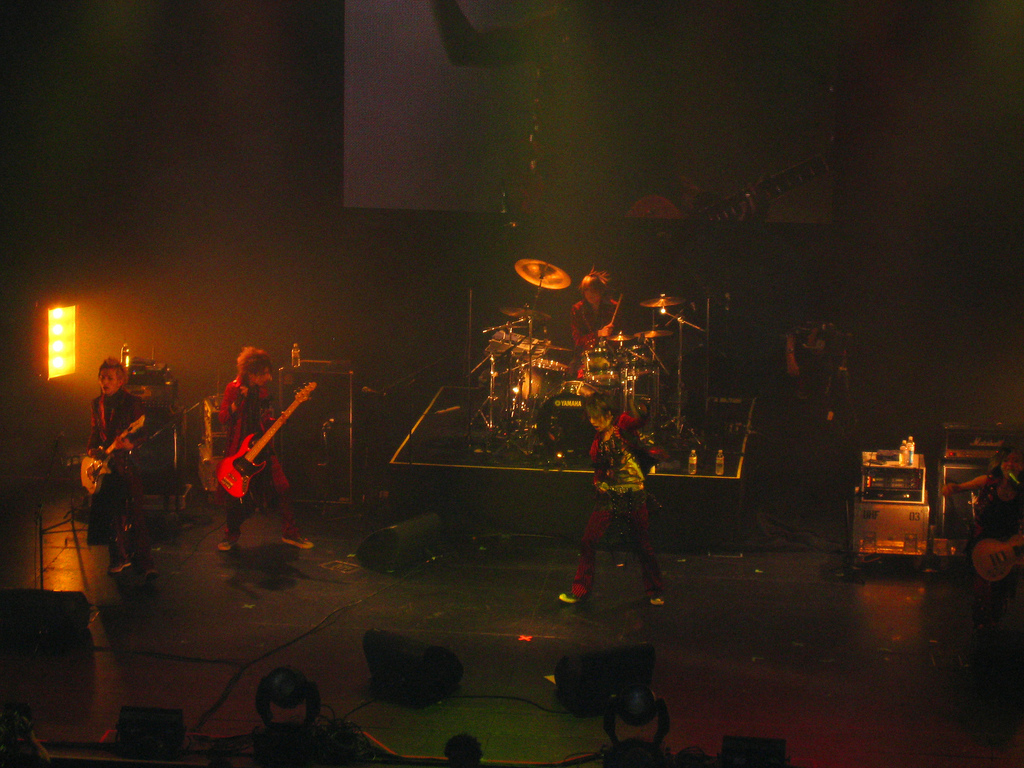
- Alice Nine performing at the Wiltern Theatre 2007. From left to right: Tora, Saga, Nao, Shou, Hiroto

Background information
- Also known as: A9 (2015–2019)
- Origin: Tokyo, Japan
- Genres: Alternative rock; pop rock; progressive rock
- Years active: 2004–2023
- Labels: PS Company; King; Tokuma Japan; Nayutawave; EMI Records Japan; CLJ (EU)
- Members: Shou; Hiroto; Tora; Saga; Nao
- Website: alicenine.jp

Alice Nine (アリス九號.; also known as A9 from 2015 to 2019) was a Japanese visual kei rock band formed in Tokyo in 2004. They were a part of PS Company until 2014. The band had King Records as its record label until 2010, when they joined Tokuma Japan. Then, in 2013, the band joined Universal Music Group's Nayutawave Records. They shortened their name to A9 in 2015, but switched back to Alice Nine in 2019. In 2023, Alice Nine announced that they would be going on a indefinite hiatus from September 3, following a last tour that began in May.

Alice Nine has released six full-length records, some of which were distributed in Europe by CLJ Records, along with several EPs, singles, and DVDs.

== History ==
=== 2004–2006: Conception and early work ===
In August 2004, Alice Nine formed after the disbandment of the band Givuss, and the band's vocalist, Shou, and guitarist Tora continued on to search for members to form a new band. Saga, the bassist for the band Delta Ark, and Nao, drummer for the bands Fatima and RusH, were also seeking bandmates as well, and the four members eventually joined. Hiroto was the last member to join after Shou, Tora, Saga, and Nao spotted him at a performance with his band at the time, Baquepia. Shou explains that the "Alice" in the band's name was something that they believed sounded "very visual kei" to them, while the "Nine" is written in kanji and represents their origins as a Japanese band.

Their first concert was held at the Ikebukuro Cyber on May 11, 2004, and soon after they released their first single, Namae wa, Mada Nai in July, and they soon toured with fellow PS Company band BIS. In November, their first EP, Gion Shouja no Kane ga Naru, was released, and later that month, they did a nationwide tour with the band Karen from Under Code Productions.

In 2005, the pace of CD releases increased; the band released the singles "Gin no Tsuki Kuroi Hoshi", "Yami ni Chiru Sakura", and "Yuri wa Aoku Saite" consecutively for three months. These singles were eventually compiled onto their first major EP, Kasou Musou Shi, through a joint deal with PS Company and King Records. Alice Nine also went on tour with several bands throughout the year, including Ayabie, Kra, and Kagrra,. Following these events, the band had its first solo tour, Alice in Wonder Tour, in August that year. They released their first album Zekkeishoku in April 2006.

=== 2007: Alpha and mainstream success ===
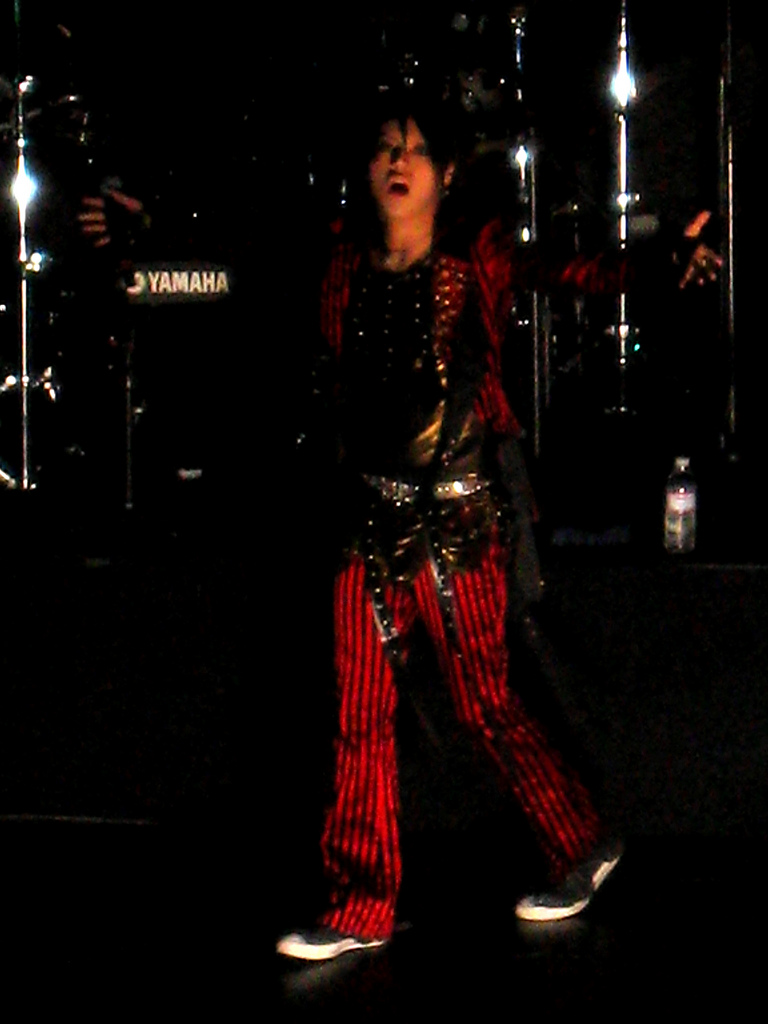
The band's vocalist, Shou.

A turning point for the band came when the single "Jewels" was released in March 2007. The single allowed the band to land their first magazine cover and feature article with volume 171 of Shoxx Magazine. Later that month on April 28, the band released Dive into the Sun, a photobook that included an exclusive CD containing the song "Gekkou Yoku". Another landmark was Alice Nine's first performance outside Japan at the JRock Revolution festival in Los Angeles, California on May 25, 2007. They joined with several other Japanese bands and became the closing performance of the Friday that weekend.

The release of the "White Prayer" single in June marked another milestone for the band's development; vocalist Shou explained in an interview with Shoxx Magazine that the song defined the style that the band was aiming for and hoped to maintain in the future. The process of the song's creation also came about more naturally than usual, as many songs until then were made through trial and error. Later that year, on October 24, the group's single "Tsubasa" was released and peaked at number six on the Oricon charts, making it one of their successful singles to date and landing the band a guest appearance on the Fuji Television variety show Hey! Hey! Hey! Music Champ and on NHK music show Music Japan.

On November 28, 2007, their second full-length album, Alpha, was released. The title for the album originated as a means to describe the band's return to their roots and beginning anew. The uppercase first letter of the Greek alphabet, Α, was chosen to symbolize this idea. Aside from the singles to be compiled onto the album, recording for songs began in September and lasted for approximately one month. The album reached the ninth position on the Oricon weekly chart, selling over 17,000 copies in its first week.

=== 2008: Vandalize ===
Alice Nine started off the year with another tour, alice nine. 2008 standing tour "A to U". However, complications arose when guitarist Tora was diagnosed with a spinal disc hernia, which had worsened over time to the point of numbness throughout the left side of his body. Finally seeking medical help, the tour had to be postponed until Tora recovered enough for the band to resume activities in Tokyo.

The band released a new single, titled "Mirror Ball" on March 26, 2008. The title song of the single was used in the live-action movie adaptation of the manga Aquarian Age.

Two compilations of the band's music videos, "Alice in Pictures I" and "Alice in Pictures II", were released on July 2, 2008. The DVDs contain approximately 8 music videos in chronological order of their original release, with "Alice in Pictures I" including the videos from "Gin no Tsuki Kuroi Hoshi" to "Number Six". "Alice in Pictures II" contains videos from "Jewels" to "Eraser -Memoire d'une fleur-", and also includes a new music video for "Gekkou Yoku", a song which was exclusively included with the "Dive into the Sun" photobook.

On August 6, the band released their latest single, "Rainbows". The single reached a peak mark of No. 3 on the Japanese Oricon daily charts which is currently the band's current top position on mainstream Japanese charts. The band also started their tour called "Discotheque play like 'A' Rainbows" which coincided with the new single. The tour lasted the entire month, and the concert footage was released on their live DVD, Discotheque play like "A" Rainbows -enter&exit-, on October 29, 2008.

The band's fourteenth maxi-single, "Cross Game", was released on December 10, 2008. The title song was used as the ending theme song for the second season of the anime Yu-Gi-Oh! 5D'S and was released in two versions. On December 19, 2008, the band's tour at the time culminated in the grand final, named "Crossing the Supernova", at NHK Hall.

A blog entry by vocalist Shou announced that the band was in recording sessions for a third album named Vandalize, which was released on January 14, 2009. "Cross Game" is the third single to be featured on the album, along with "Mirror Ball" and "Rainbows" for a total of 11 tracks. The album's title comes from the theme of "the destruction of culture".

=== 2009: Fifth anniversary ===
In the following weeks of the release of Vandalize, the band started their tour for the year, Untitled Vandal(ism). The first half of the tour ran from February to April, while its second half ran throughout the month of July. The tour's finale, "Graced the Beautiful Day", occurred on August 23, 2009, at the Tokyo International Forum Hall. Footage from the finale, as well as live studio performance footage, is set to be released on the live DVD, "Untitled Vandal(ism) #Finale 'Graced the Beautiful Day,'" on November 11, 2009.

On June 2, 2009, a blog entry by vocalist Shou announced the changing of their name from "アリス九號". or "alice nine". to "Alice Nine" for media reasons. He explained that the Japanese transcription was beginning to lose its purpose as a means to "represent aesthetics" and that the English transcription was closest to the band's original intention. The Japanese transcription could also not be read as the band's proper name without the use of furigana or other means of alternative text. The entry also announced new work for the band's fifth anniversary—a new single and a new book, which would use the new English transcription upon release. Alice Nine's fifteenth maxi-single, "Hana", was released on August 5, 2009. Shou describes the title track as a "danceable song with a sweet and oriental feeling." "Piece of 5ive Elements 'The Book' ~Alice Nine 5th~" is a book containing interviews, reports on the band's concert activities during 2009, photography, and more, and was released on August 24, 2009.

On December 16, Alice Nine held their last concert for 2009. During the three-hour-long event, they performed a variety of songs from their entire career. For the very first song of the night, the band also performed a cover of The Beatles' hit song, "All You Need Is Love".

=== 2010–2012: Gemini and 9 ===
The band began its activities in 2010 with the announcement of a compilation album, Alice Nine Complete Collection 2006-2009, which contains the title songs from each of the band's maxi-singles released since 2006. The compilation album was released on March 24, 2010. The band also finished their first tour of the year, Kikagaku no Kotowari (幾何学ノ理), that same month.

In 2009, the band would also begin broadcasting programs on their own channel, "Alice 9 Channel", on the popular Japanese video sharing website Nico Nico Douga. The monthly program, hosted by guitarist Tora, features live interviews and announcements with members of the band, as well as broadcasts of concert footage and music videos. The live structure of the broadcast also allows users to comment on the program and give real-time feedback on questions directed towards the audience. The first installment of the program aired in September 2009 and was viewed by over 16,000 users.

On April 4, 2010, during the final live of the Kikagaku no Kotowari tour, the band announced the release of a new single on August 4, 2010. However, the official website stated a slight delay of the single's release, pushing the release date to August 25, 2010. In the same announcement, the single was officially titled "Senkou". Filming of the music video for "Senkou" began in May 2010.

The band's official 2010 tour, Flash Light from the past, began on July 5, 2010. The tour spanned over the following four months with 30 performances in 27 live houses across Japan. The tour ended with a concert on January 6, 2011, at the Nippon Budokan. Approximately 8,000 people attended the concert, which was held at the Nippon Budokan. The final performance was aired on January 31 on WOWOW, and a DVD containing footage of the concert is to be released on May 2, 2011. The bass guitars and outfit that Saga used during the tour were displayed at ESP Ochanomizu Technical House in Tokyo, Japan until January 23.

In the November 2010 edition of "Alice 9 Channel", Saga accidentally revealed the title and tentative release date for the band's fourth studio album, Gemini, earlier than planned. Details of the album followed soon after, and Gemini was released on February 9, 2011. The album ranked at number 3 on the Oricon Weekly Charts upon release, making the album their highest ranking release yet. A tour coinciding with the release of the album, entitled "Spring Circuit -Prelude to 'Gemini'-", will run from April to May 2011. On February 22, 2012, Alice Nine released their album 9. The majority of the year was spent with performing concert tours.

=== 2012–2014: Supernova and Asian tour debut ===
In August 2012, Alice nine announced that they were switching record labels to Universal Music's Nayutawave Records. The band stated on their Niconico web talk show "Alice9 Channel" that in order to make up for having only one release in 2012, they would release 3 new singles in 2013 three months in a row. They later went on to release "Daybreak" on March 20, 2013, "Shadowplay" on April 17 and "Shooting Star" on May 29.

On March 19, 2014, Alice Nine released their sixth studio album Supernova which contains the previously released singles "Daybreak", "Shadowplay", "Shooting Star", "Kaizen Zenya", "Exist", and "Shining", as well as six new songs. Alice Nine then traveled to Asia with shows in Shenzhen, Guangzhou, Wuhan, Beijing, Shanghai, Chongqing, Xiamen, Taichung, Singapore, Kuala Lumpur, Hong Kong and Seoul, before returning to Japan. On August 25, 2014, they parted ways with PS Company after ten years. On October 29, 2014, the [Resolution -Alice in Asia-] DVD containing selected performances from concerts in 2014 and a documentary detailing their travel experiences, behind-the-stage footage and interviews with the band members.

=== 2015–2019: Name change and returning to their roots ===
The A9 logo, used since 2015.

On March 1, 2015, the group announced that they will now be known as A9. They also announced the EP Ginga no wo to, which they hoped to finance through a crowdfunding program. The EP was released in August 2015. Most of the crowdfunding went to the production of the EP's title track, "Spiegel". Following Ginga no wo to, the band released another EP entitled Light and Darkness. Those that preordered the EP received the track "ANIMUS", ahead of its release. On August 28, the band held a tour by the name of XII ANNIVERSARY 2004-2005 ONLY LIVE "NO NAME", in which they performed songs from their early era. Their single "MEMENTO" was released on February 28, 2017, and their new album Ideal was released on April 12, 2017, with the title track "Adam."

=== 2019–2023: comeback under the name Alice Nine and indefinite hiatus ===
In August 2019, they announced their comeback under the name Alice Nine (アリス九號). On April 29, 2020, they released the ninth full album "Fuyajou Eden".

On November 11, 2020, Alice Nine released their 10th full album "Wonderland With Black"

On November 2, 2022, Alice Nine released their 11th full album titled "GRACE".

On January 9, 2023, they announced that on September 3, 2023, Alice Nine would indefinitely "freeze" their activities.

== Members ==
- Shou (将) – vocals, leader
  - As of January 2012, the position of band leader has been moved from Nao to Shou.
- Hiroto (ヒロト) – guitars
  - Hiroto was a member of the supergroup Karasu, that formed in 2009 with Tatsuro (Mucc), Mizuki (Sadie), Dunch (Jealkb) and Kenzo (Ayabie).
- Tora (虎) – guitars
  - Tora also participated in the supergroup The Tokyo High Black as lead guitarist "Mon Marshy", with Saga as "Tomorrow Joe" and Musasaby (Nao from Kagrra,), Madao (Keiyu from Kra), Tako (Takuya from Administrator) and Gey (drums).
- Saga (沙我) – bass, keyboards
  - Saga also participated in the supergroup The Tokyo High Black as rhythm guitarist "Tomorrow Joe".
- Nao – drums
  - Nao served as the band leader from 2004 to 2012.

== Discography ==
=== Studio albums ===
- Zekkeishoku (絶景色; Vivid Scenery of Colors, April 4, 2006) Oricon Weekly Album Chart Position: 13
- Alpha (November 28, 2007) 9
- Vandalize (January 14, 2009) 7
- Gemini (February 9, 2011) 3
- 9 (February 22, 2012) 12
- Supernova (March 19, 2014) 39
- Ideal (April 12, 2017) 18
- Planet Nine (April 25, 2018) 32
- Fuyajō Eden (不夜城エデン; Eden the Nightless City, April 29, 2020) 57
- Kuro to Wandārando (黒とワンダーランド; Wonderland with Black, November 11, 2020)
- Grace (November 2, 2022)

=== Extended plays ===
- Gion Shouja no Kane ga Naru (祇園盛者の鐘が鳴る; The Gion Temple's Bells Toll, November 17, 2004) 62
- Alice in Wonderland, (July 27, 2005) 55
- Ginga no wo to (銀河ノヲト; Sound of The Galaxy, August 2015)
- Light and Darkness (April 13, 2016)
- Medley (November 24, 2021)

=== Compilation albums ===
- Kasou Musou Shi (華想夢想紙; Flower Fancying Dream Fancying Paper, November 23, 2005) 47
- Alice Nine Complete Collection 2006-2009 (March 24, 2010) 46
- Alice Nine Complete Collection II 2010-2012 (August 21, 2013)
- 15TH ANNIVERSARY BEST ALBUM (風月の詩; Poem of the Wind and Moon, April 24, 2019)

=== Singles ===
- Namae wa, Mada Nai (名前は、未だ無ひ; I Don't Yet Have a Name, July 5, 2004) Oricon Weekly Single Chart Position: 94
- Gin no Tsuki Kuroi Hoshi (銀の月 黒い星; Silver Moon, Black Star, March 30, 2005) 45
- Yami ni Chiru Sakura (闇ニ散ル桜; Cherry Blossoms Scattered in the Darkness, April 25, 2005) 54
- Yuri wa Aoku Saite (百合は蒼く咲いて; Lilies Bloom Palely, May 25, 2005) 51
- Kowloon Nine Heads Rodeo Show (九龍; Nine Dragons, January 25, 2006) 22
- Fantasy (February 22, 2006) 20
- Akatsuki/Ikuoku no Chandelier (暁 / 幾億のシャンデリア; Dawn/Several Million Chandeliers, February 22, 2006) 24
- Blue Planet (October 4, 2006)
- Number Six (October 4, 2006)
- Jewels (March 21, 2007) 15
- White Prayer (June 6, 2007) 12
- Tsubasa (October 24, 2007) 6
- Mirror Ball (March 26, 2008) 6
- Rainbows (August 6, 2008) 6
- Cross Game (December 10, 2008) 8
- Hana (華; Flower, August 5, 2009) 8
- Senkou (閃光; Flash, August 25, 2010) 12
- Stargazer: (November 11, 2010) 10
- Blue Flame (June 8, 2011) 12
- Heart of Gold, (September 7, 2011) 8
- Niji no Yuki (虹の雪; Rainbow-colored Snow, December 21, 2011) 7
- Daybreak (March 20, 2013) 10
- Shadow Play (April 17, 2013) 11
- Shooting Star (May 29, 2013) 14
- Kaisen Zenya/Exist (開戦前夜, December 6, 2013)
- Merry Christmas to U (December 6, 2013)
- Shining (February 26, 2014)
- Memento (February 28, 2017)

=== DVDs ===
- [2006.01.12] Alice in Wonderfilm
- [2006] Peace & Smile Carnival tour 2005 (～皆そろって笑顔でファッキュー～)
- [2006.10.04] Number Six
- [2007.01.24] Hello, Dear Numbers
- [2007.07.10] Kachoufuugetsu Vol.2 (花鳥風月 Vol.2)
- [2007.07.11] Royal Straight Flash
- [2007.09.03] Royal Straight Kingdom
- [2008.07.02] Alice in Pictures I
- [2008.07.02] Alice in Pictures II
- [2008.10.29] Discotheque play like "A" Rainbows -enter&exit-
- [2009.04.15] PSCompany 10th Anniversary Peace & Smile Carnival (PS Company 10周年記念公演)
- [2009.11.11] Untitled Vandal（ism）#Finale [Graced The Beautiful Day]
- [2011.05.02] Tokyo Galaxy Alice Nine Live Tour 10 "Flash Light from the Past" Final at Nippon Budokan
- [2012.06.05] Alice in Pictures III
- [2013.06.19] 2012 Court of "9"#4 Grand Finale Countdown Live
- [2014.10.29] Resolution -ALICE IN ASIA-

=== Bibliography ===
- [2007.04.28] "Dive into the Sun" (photo book)
- [2007.12.25] "Shiny Summer X'mas 2007" (photo book)
- [2008.02.29] "Alpha" (band score and tablature)
- [2008.03.27] "Zekkeishoku" (band score and tablature)
- [2008.09.13] "Alice Nine. First Piano Collection" (piano solo tablature)
- [2009.] "[Untitled Vandal(ism)#1]"
- [2009.] "[Untitled Vandal(ism)#2]"
- [2009.07.07] "Vandalize" (band score and tablature)
- [2009.08.24] "Piece of 5ive Elements 'The Book' ~Alice Nine 5th~"
