= Kowloon Nine Heads Rodeo Show =

"Kowloon -Nine Heads Rodeo Show-"

Single by Alice Nine
- Released: January 25, 2006
- Genre: Alternative rock, nu metal
- Label: PS Company, King

Alice Nine singles chronology
| "Yuri wa Aoku Saite" (2005) | "Kowloon -Nine Heads Rodeo Show-" (2006) | "Fantasy" (2006) |

"Kowloon -Nine Heads Rodeo Show-" (九龍-Nine Heads Rodeo Show-) is the fifth maxi single by Japanese band Alice Nine. It was released on January 25, 2006. The single was released in two versions: the limited edition of the single includes a DVD containing the music video for the title track, and the regular edition includes a bonus track.

The title track was later released on the band's first album, Zekkeishoku.

It is one of the band's most popular live tracks and has been played on every tour since the release of Zekkeishoku.

== Commercial performance ==
The single reached number 22 on Oricon Singles Chart, staying on chart for six weeks.

== Track listing ==
=== Version 1 (CD and DVD) ===
1. "Kowloon -Nine Heads Rodeo Show-" (九龍-Nine Heads Rodeo Show-)
2. "Red Carpet Going On"
- "Kowloon -Nine Heads Rodeo Show-" music video (九龍-Nine Heads Rodeo Show-)

=== Version 2 (CD only) ===
1. "Kowloon -Nine Heads Rodeo Show-" (九龍-Nine Heads Rodeo Show-)
2. "Red Carpet Going On"
3. "Senjō ni Hanataba wo" (戦場に花束を; In a Battlefield with a Bouquet)
