= Yuri wa Aoku Saite =

Single by Alice Nine
- Released: May 25, 2005
- Genre: Alternative rock, pop rock
- Label: PS Company, King

Alice Nine singles chronology
"Yami ni Chiru Sakura" (2005)	"Yuri wa Aoku Saite" (2005)	"Kowloon Nine Heads Rodeo Show" (2006)

Yuri wa Aoku Saite (百合は蒼く咲いて) is the fourth maxi single by Japanese band Alice Nine. It was released on May 25, 2005. The single was released with a DVD containing the music video for "Yuri wa Aoku Saite."

Both songs on the single were later released on Alice Nine's third EP, Kasou Musou Shi.

== Track listing ==
1. Yuri wa Aoku Saite (百合は蒼く咲いて; Lilies Bloom Palely) – 5:08
2. Seija no Parade (聖者のパレード; Parade of the Saints) – 4:15

=== Bonus DVD ===
1. Yuri wa Aoku Saite (百合は蒼く咲いて; Lilies Bloom Palely)
