= Fantasy (Alice Nine song) =

Single by Alice Nine

from the album Zekkeishoku
- Released: February 22, 2006
- Genre: Pop rock; alternative rock
- Length: 5:27
- Label: PS Company; King Records
- Songwriter: Alice Nine

Alice Nine singles chronology
"Kowloon Nine Heads Rodeo Show" (2006)	"Fantasy" (2006)	"Akatsuki/Ikuoku no Chandelier" (2006)

"Fantasy" is a single by the Japanese rock band Alice Nine. It is featured on their first album Zekkeishoku and coincided with the double a-side release "Akatsuki/Ikuoku no Chandelier". The single was released in two versions, one with a bonus track and the other with a DVD of the "Fantasy" music video.

== Track listing ==
Type A (CD & DVD)

1. "Fantasy"
2. "Lemon"
3. "Fantasy" music video

Type B (CD only)

1. "Fantasy"
2. "Lemon" (檸檬)
3. "Tentai Umbrella" (Umbrella of Heavenly Bodies) (天体アンブレラ)
