= Yami ni chiru sakura =

"Yami ni Chiru Sakura"

Single by Alice Nine
- Released: April 27, 2005
- Genre: Alternative rock, pop rock, Nu Metal
- Label: PS Company, King

Alice Nine singles chronology
"Gin no Tsuki Kuroi Hoshi" (2005)	"Yami ni Chiru Sakura" (2005)	"Yuri wa Aoku Saite" (2005)

Yami ni Chiru Sakura (闇ニ散ル桜) is the third maxi single by Japanese band Alice Nine. It was released on April 27, 2005. The single was released with a DVD containing the music video for "Yami ni Chiru Sakura." The second track, "Byakuya ni Kuroneko," was an earlier song created when vocalist Shou and guitarist Tora were in their previous band, Givuss.

Both songs on the single were later released on Alice Nine's third EP, Kasou Musou Shi.

== Track list ==
1. "Yami ni Chiru Sakura" (闇ニ散ル桜; Cherry Blossoms Scattered in the Darkness) – 4:12
2. "Byakuya ni Kuroneko" (白夜ニ黒猫; Black Cat in the White Night) – 4:52

=== DVD ===
1. "Yami ni Chiru Sakura" (闇ニ散ル桜; Cherry Blossoms Scattered in the Darkness)
