= Sug =

Japanese rock band

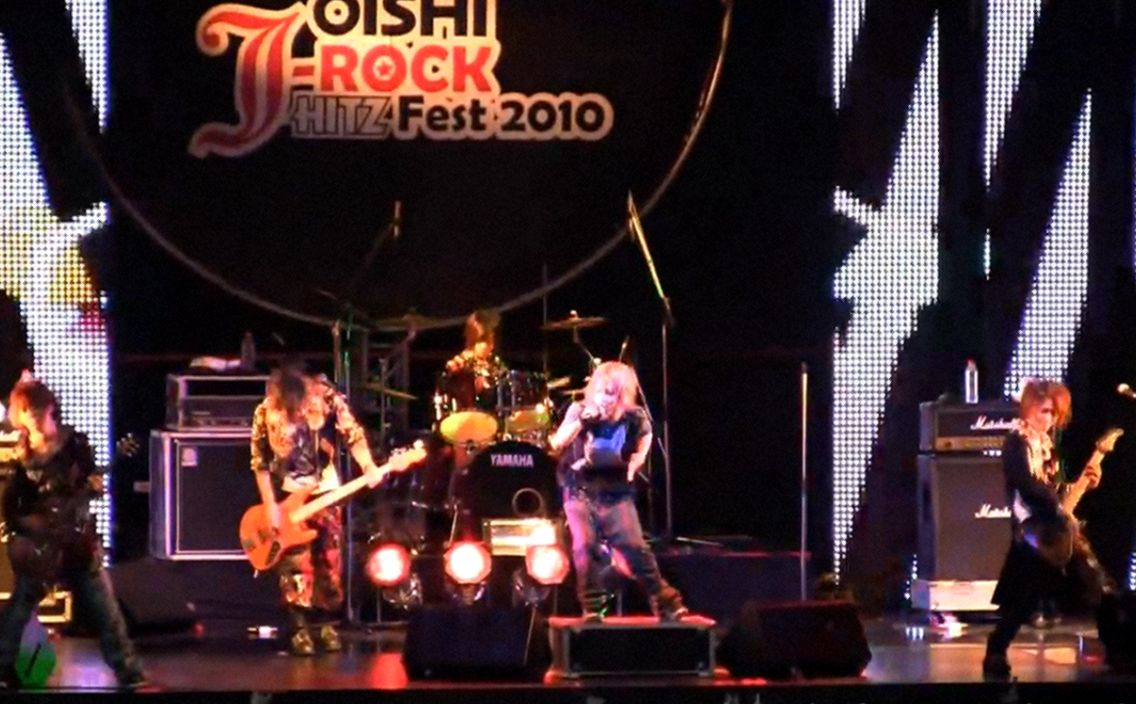
- Sug performing in Bangkok in 2010

Background information
- Also known as: Sug Heavy Positive Rock
- Origin: Japan
- Genres: Alternative rock; pop punk; electronic rock; nu metal
- Years active: 2006–2012, 2013-2017
- Labels: PS Company; Indie PSC; Pony Canyon; CLJ Records
- Members: Takeru; Yuji; Chiyu; Masato; Shinpei
- Past members: Shōta; Mitsuru
- Website: www.sug-web.jp

Sug (typeset as SuG) was a Japanese visual kei rock band formed in 2006. The band has released two EPs, five full-length studio albums, and several singles. Until 2009, the band was signed to "Indie PSC", a subdivision of PS Company. As of 2010, they have signed onto a major label, Pony Canyon. The band's tagline in promotional work is "Heavy Positive Rock".

== History ==
Vocalist Takeru and guitarists Masato and Yuji had previously performed in a band called Travel. After Travel disbanded, they joined with AmeriA's bassist, Shouta, to form Sug in October 2006. The drummer Mitsuru then joined in November of the same year.

Shouta left the band in February and was replaced by Chiyu on bass. Their first release was "7th Breeze" on the compilation album Cannonball Vol. 03. The band signed to the visual-kei management PS Company, and in August 2007, the band released their first single, "Scheat". Months after the release of their first single, Sug released their first EP, titled I Scream Party. To promote their music outside Japan, Sug performed at "J-Rock Invasion" in Germany alongside Kagrra, Kra, Alice Nine, and Screw—all of whom are also signed to CLJ Records, a German label.

Mitsuru left Sug after their concert on 9 May 2009. Their support drummer at the time, Shinpei, became a full-time member of the band after Mitsuru's departure.

Following the announcement of their single "Gr8 Story", Sug announced their move onto major label PS Company during the live event called "Sug Fes 2009 Alternative Pop Show: Vol.6" on 30 November 2009. "Gr8 Story" was released through Pony Canyon, and the title track was used as the ending song for the Katekyō Hitman Reborn! anime According to the band, the song is "rather punkish", yet with a catchy tune and an "easy-listening appeal".

Their second studio album and their first album through Pony Canyon, Tokyo Muzical Hotel, was released on 9 March 2010. Their third studio album and their second album through Pony Canyon, Thrill Ride Pirates, was released a year later, also on 9 March, and included two singles; "mad$hip" and "Crazy Bunny Coaster".

On 25 April 2012, the band released their third studio album, Lollipop Kingdom, which produced five singles: "Pastel Horror Yum Yum Show", "Gimme×Gimme", "Toy Soldier", "Howling Magic", and "不完全BeautyFool Days".

On 7 October 2012, Sug announced they would officially leave PSC after their performance on 29 December at Yoyogi Kyogijo Daini Taikukan, resulting in a temporary hiatus. Sug announced on 19 September 2013 that the hiatus would end in late December of that year. The band went on to release three singles, "Missing", "B.A.B.Y." and "Cry Out" over the course of 2014.

On 4 March 2015 Sug released Black, their first full-length album since the end of their hiatus. The album included three new singles in addition to the three released in 2014. On 15 July 2015, Sug released another single, "TeenAge Dream". On 11 September Sug announced that they would be going on their first full-length Europe Tour starting from 29 November, and they would tour a total of 5 countries (Germany, France, United Kingdom, Russia and Finland).

On 31 July 2017, SuG announced that it would be going on indefinite hiatus for the second time. The band's final performance occurred on 2 September 2017 at Nippon Budokan. Although officially labelled a hiatus, Takeru doubted that the band would ever resume its activities. On 20 December 2017, the band announced on its official website that it had decided to disband.

== Name ==
The name "Sug" is derived from the transliteration of the English word "thug", written (and pronounced) in Japanese as Sagu (サグ). The name is then simplified to the slightly more romantic "Sug".

== Members ==
- Takeru (武瑠) – Vocals
- Masato – Guitar
- Yuji – Guitar
- Chiyu – Bass
- Shinpei – Drums

Former members

- Shōta (渉歌) – bass (2006–2007)
- Mitsuru – drums (2006–2009)

== Tours ==
=== Overseas tours ===
Sug 2015 Europe Tour (2015)

Date	Place	Venue
29 November 2015	Cologne, Germany	Werkstatt
30 November 2015	Paris, France	Backstage
2 December 2015	London, United Kingdom	O2 Academy Islington (O2 Academy2)
3 December 2015	Berlin, Germany	Machinenhaus
5 December 2015	Munich, Germany	Technikum
7 December 2015	Moscow, Russia	Moscow Hall
8 December 2015	Helsinki, Finland	Tavastia Club

Details: SuG 2015 Europe Tour Official Site

== Discography ==
=== Albums and EPs ===
Title	Release date	Oricon Chart
I Scream Party	19 December 2007	181
N0iz Star	14 May 2008	41
Punkitsch	3 September 2008	77
Tokyo Muzical Hotel	9 March 2010	26
Thrill Ride Pirates	9 March 2011	15
Lollipop Kingdom	25 April 2012	10
Black	4 March 2015	-
Virgin	9 March 2016	-

=== Singles ===
Title	Release date	Oricon Chart
"Scheat"	1 August 2007	-
"Yumigiwa Downer" (夢際ダウナー)	2 September 2007	-
"Alterna."	5 September 2007	-
"Tricolour Color" (虜ロォルカラァ)	3 December 2008	-
"39GalaxyZ"	15 April 2009	-
"Life 2Die"	14 October 2009	-
"Pink Masquerade"	18 November 2009	-
"Gr8 Story"	27 January 2010	13
"Koakuma Sparkling" (小悪魔Sparkling)	30 June 2010	7
"R.P.G.: Rockin' Playing Game"	1 September 2010	14
"Crazy Bunny Coaster"	12 January 2011	3
"Gimi Gimi" (☆ギミギミ☆)	15 June 2011	8
"Toy Soldier"	26 October 2011	9
"Fukanzen Beautifool Days" (不完全Beautyfool Days)	1 February 2012	8
"Sweetoxic"	19 September 2012	10
"Missing"	19 February 2014	13
"B.A.B.Y"	23 August 2014	13
"Cry Out"	19 November 2014	-

=== Best-of albums ===
Title	Release date	Oricon Chart
Best 2010-2012	6 March 2013	25

=== DVDs ===
Title	Release date	Oricon Chart
Sug Tour 2010 "Tokyo Muzical Hotel"	25 August 2010	49
Sug Tour 2011「TRiP~welcome-to-Thrill-Ride-Pirates~」	21 September 2011	22
Sug Oneman Show 2011 VIP Pop Show	21 March 2012	47
The Lollipop Kingdom Show	10 October 2012	46
Sug Oneman Show 2012 This iz 0 2012.12.29 at Yoyogi 2nd Gymnasium	10 April 2013	33
Sug Onemanshow 2013 Update Ver.0	16 April 2014	42
Versus	28 January 2015	276

=== DVD singles ===
Title	Release date	Oricon Chart
Mujoken Kofukuron (無条件幸福論)	17 November 2010	7

=== Compilations ===
Title	Release date
Cannonball Vol. 3	2 February 2007
