= Tokyo Muzical Hotel =

Studio album by Sug
- Released: March 9, 2010
- Recorded: 2009–2010
- Genre: Rock
- Label: PS Company; Pony Canyon

Sug chronology
Punkitsch (2008)	Tokyo Muzical Hotel (2010)	Thrill Ride Pirates (2011)

Tokyo Muzical Hotel (typeset in promotional material as TOKYO MUZiCAL HOTEL) is the second full-length album by Sug. It is the band's first album release since their major label debut on Pony Canyon. It was released on March 9, 2010, in two editions: one limited edition, which includes an exclusive DVD with the music video for "dot.0", and a regular edition that features 5 extra tracks not available in the limited edition.

The album charted in the top 30 of the Oricon daily rankings upon release.

== Track listing ==
=== Limited edition ===
Disk one (CD)

1. "Gr8 Story" - 3:30
2. "Life♥2Die (album mix)" - 3:07
3. "Block Party MonstAr" - 3:45
4. "39GalaxyZ (album mix)" - 3:57
5. "武士道 -bushido- Freaky" - 3:37
6. "Umbilical (new arrange version)" - 3:52
7. "Kaori" (薫) - 5:55
8. "P!NK masquerade. (album mix)" - 3:37
9. "L.E.D Ghosty" - 3:42
10. "Karma Discord" - 3:36
11. "16bit HERO 2" - 1:47
12. "little lover boy" - 3:29
13. "dot.0" - 5:32

Disk two (DVD)

1. "dot.0" - 5:32

=== Regular edition ===
1. "million $ orchestra" - 1:10
2. "gr8 story" - 3:30
3. "Life♥2Die (album mix)" - 3:07
4. "Block Party MonstAr" - 3:45
5. "early morning children" - 0:29
6. "39GalaxyZ (album mix)" - 3:57
7. "武士道 -bushido- Freaky" - 3:37
8. "sweet box refrain" - 0:38
9. "Umbilical (new arrange version)" - 3:52
10. "Kaori" (薫) - 5:55
11. "industrial police" - 0:56
12. "P!NK masquerade. (album mix)" - 3:37
13. "L.E.D Ghosty" - 3:42
14. "Karma Discord" - 3:36
15. "super kawaiiii" - 0:58
16. "16bit HERO 2" - 1:47
17. "little lover boy" - 3:29
18. "dot.0" - 5:32
