= Alice in Wonderland (EP) =

EP by Alice Nine
- Released: July 27, 2005
- Genre: Punk rock
- Length: 23:46
- Labels: King Records; PS Company
- Producer: Alice Nine

Alice Nine chronology
Gion Shouja no Kane ga Naru (2005)	Alice in Wonderland (2005)	Kasou Musou Shi (2005)

Alice in Wonderland is the second EP from visual kei rock band Alice Nine. It was released on the July 27, 2005. Includes 5 tracks.

== Track listing ==
1. "Siva&Diva" – 4:01
2. "Shunka Shuutou" (春夏秋冬, Spring Summer Autumn Winter) – 4:41
3. "Souen -Na mo Naki Kimi e-" (葬園-名も無き君へ-, Graveyard to the Nameless You) – 5:59
4. "Haikara Naru Rinbu Kyoku" (ハイカラなる輪舞曲, Westernised Rondo) – 4:04
5. "Heisei Juushichinen Shichigatsu Nanoka" (平成17年7月7日, 7 July, Heisei 17 (2005) 7th Day of the 7th Month of the 17th Year of the Emperor's Reign) – 5:03

== Notes ==
- Alice in Wonderland was re-released later in 2005.
- The first pressings came with a special packaging.
- The title of the fifth track, "Heisei Juushichinen Shichigatsu Nanoka," corresponds to the date of July 7 of the seventeenth year of Japan's Heisei era, or 2005.
- The backwards "R" in the title was an idea put forth by the rhythm guitarist, Tora, from his love of the American band KoЯn.
