= Blue Flame (disambiguation) =

Blue Flame is a rocket-powered car.

Blue Flame may also refer to:

== Film and theater ==
- The Blue Flame (play), a 1920 play by George V. Hobart and John Willard
- Blue Flame (film), a 1993 science fiction movie

== Music ==
- Jimmy James and the Blue Flames, a 1960s American rock band formed by Jimi Hendrix
- Georgie Fame and the Blue Flames, a 1960s British R&B band
- Blue Flames, a 1964 album by Shirley Scott and Stanley Turrentine
- Blue Flame, a 2001 album by Simon Shaheen and Qantara
- Blue Flame (Jon Allen album), 2018
- "Blue Flame", a song by Joe Jackson from Volume 4
- "Blue Flame", a song by Alice Nine from 9
- "Blue Flame", a song by Le Sserafim from Fearless, 2022

== Other ==
- Blue Flame (engine), a Chevrolet engine
- Blue Flames (autobiography), autobiography series of Japanese figure skater Yuzuru Hanyu

== See also ==
- Kardemir Karabükspor, a Turkish sports club nicknamed 'Blue Flame'
