= Gion Shouja no Kane ga Naru =

EP by Alice Nine
- Released: November 17, 2004; November 23, 2005
- Genre: Punk rock
- Length: 21:41
- Labels: PS Company; King Records

Alice Nine chronology
Gion Shouja no Kane ga Naru (2004)	Alice in Wonderland (2005)

Gion Shouja no Kane ga Naru (祇園盛者の鐘が鳴る; The Gion Temple's Bells Toll) is an Alice Nine extended play that was released on November 17, 2004. It was later re-released on the King Records label on November 23, 2005.

== Track listing ==
1. Gradation (グラデーション)
2. Gokusai Gokushiki Gokudouka (極彩極色極道歌<G3>; Brilliantly Coloured Immoral Poem)
3. Akai Kazeguruma (朱い風車; Red Pinwheel)
4. Honjitsu wa Seiten Nari (本日ハ晴天ナリ; Today the Sky Cleared)
5. H.A.N.A.B.I. (Fireworks)

== Notes ==
- Gion Shouja no Kane ga Naru was re-released later in 2005.
- The first pressings came with a special packaging.
