= N0iz Star =

Studio album by Sug
- Released: May 14, 2008
- Recorded: 2008
- Genre: Rock
- Length: 41:57 (CD); 47:13(DVD)
- Label: PS Company

Sug chronology
I Scream Party (2007)	N0iz Star (2008)	Punkitsch (2008)

N0iz Star (typeset often as n0iZ stAr) is the first full-length album by Sug, released May 14, 2008. It includes 11 tracks, a DVD with the music video for "Vi-Vi-Vi" and a forty-page booklet.

== Track listing ==
Disk one (CD)

1. Chocoholic N0iz - 1:08
2. B.R.K - 3:36
3. Kokuu (虚空) - 4:15
4. Vi-Vi-Vi - 4:48
5. Yami Tsuki Delay (ヤミツキディレイ) - 4:14
6. Shikisai (四季彩) - 5:09
7. Romantic - 4:22
8. Seiyokuholic (生欲Holic) - 3:29
9. Crimson soda - 3:42
10. Uesto Faaito Sto~ri~ (うえすとふぁいとすと～り～) - 3:54
11. PikaLife - 3:20

Disk two (DVD)

1. "Vi-Vi-Vi" - 5:16
