= Fuyajou Eden =

Studio album by Alice Nine
- Released: April 29, 2020
- Genre: Alternative rock
- Length: 29:02
- Language: Japanese
- Label: Nine Heads Records
- Producer: nishi-ken

Alice Nine chronology
Planet Nine (2018)	Fuyajou Eden (2020)	Kuro to Wonderland (2020)

Fuyajou Eden (不夜城エデン; lit. "Eden the Nightless City") is the ninth studio album by Japanese rock band Alice Nine. It was released on April 29, 2020 in two editions: the regular edition containing only the CD and the fan club limited edition containing the CD and two DVDs.

== Overview ==
After leaving PS Company in 2014, the band changed the name Alice Nine. (ア リ ス 九號.) to A9. In 2019, the group returned to their old name and "Fuyajou Eden" was described as "Alice Nine's first album in 11 years". The music video for "Testament" aired on YouTube on March 22, 2020, showing a mix of the band's old and new sound.

Fuyajou Eden was produced by Japanese music producer nishi-ken. The track "Tsumibito" (罪人) was inspired by the manga Children of the Whales.

== Charts ==
The album peaked at the 57th position on the Oricon Albums Chart, staying on chart for two weeks.

== Tour ==
The national tour for the album's release, called "Alice Nine. ONEMAN TOUR 2020「 Fuyajou touhikou 」" featured twelve dates across Japan. The first performance, on April 28, was limited to fan club members.

== Track listing ==
=== Regular edition ===
CD
No.	Title	Length
1.	"Kakumei Kaika -epilogue-" (革命開花 -epilogue-)	1:31
2.	"Kakumei Kaika -Revolutionary Blooming-" (革命開花-Revolutionary Blooming-)	3:49
3.	"Babylon"	3:40
4.	"Testament"	3:40
5.	"Asobi" (游戏-ASOBI-)	4:28
6.	"Tsumibito" (罪人)	3:39
7.	"Cyan"	4:09
8.	"Everlasting"	4:06
Total length:		29:02

=== Limited fan club edition ===
DVD 1
No.	Title	Length
1.	"Cradle to Alpha"
2.	"Hana【hae･ne】" (華【hae･ne】)
3.	"Kakumei Kaika -Revolutionary Blooming-" (革命開花-Revolutionary Blooming-)
4.	"Fuurin" (風凛)
5.	"Tender"
6.	"Daybreak"
7.	"Merry Christmas to U"
8.	"Shunkashuto" (春夏秋冬)
9.	"Gin no Tsuki Kuroi Hoshi" (銀の月 黒い星)

DVD 2
No.	Title	Length
1.	"Subete e" (すべてへ)
2.	"the Arc"
3.	"-Entr'acte-"
4.	"GEMINI-0-eternal"
5.	"GEMINI-I-the void"
6.	"GEMINI-II-the luv"
7.	"the beautiful name"
8.	"Rainbows"
9.	"Memento"

== Personnel ==
- Shou (将) – vocal
- Hiroto (ヒロト) – guitar
- Tora (虎) – guitar
- Saga (沙我) – bass
- Nao (ナオ) – drums
