= Tsubasa (Alice Nine song) =

Single by alice nine.

from the album Tsubasa [Single]
- Released: October 24, 2007
- Recorded: 2007
- Genre: Pop rock
- Length: 4:59
- Label: Free-Will; PS Company
- Songwriter(s): alice nine.
- Producer(s): alice nine.

Alice nine. singles chronology
| "White Prayer" (2007) | "Tsubasa" (2007) | "Mirror Ball" (2008) |

"Tsubasa" (typeset as TSUBASA.) is the 10th physical single and 11th overall maxi single from Alice Nine. It was released on October 24, 2007.

The single was released in three versions: two limited editions and one regular edition. The limited editions include the songs "Tsubasa" and "Ruri no Ame" and a DVD; the DVD for Type A includes the music video for "Tsubasa," and the DVD for Type B includes the music video for "Ruri no Ame." The regular edition does not include a DVD but features a bonus track, "Follow Me." In the weeks preceding the single's release, both music videos featured on the single were broadcast on television in Japan, such as on Music On! TV.

In Japan, it peaked at #6 on the Oricon charts, which was the band's highest ever rank on a mainstream music chart at the time.

== Track listing ==
Version 1 (promotional CD)

1. "Tsubasa" – 4:59 (Wings)
2. "Ruri no Ame" – 4:23 (瑠璃の雨 Lapis Lazuli Rain)
3. "Tsubasa" Music Video

Version 2 (CD)

1. "Tsubasa" – 4:59
2. "Ruri no Ame" – 4:23
3. "Ruri no Ame" Music Video

Version 3 (CD)

1. "Tsubasa" – 4:59
2. "Ruri no Ame" – 4:23
3. "Follow Me" – 3:12

== Music videos ==
A screenshot of Tsubasa, depicting the green lasers and the band playing the song

The music video for "Tsubasa" features the band members in uniform as they perform in either a dark room filled with green lasers or a large ethereal stage with large panels displaying imagery similar to music visualizations. Several scenes depict vocalist Shou in a room surrounded by mirrors and lasers. Some scenes also show several buildings and a flower crumbling away into blocks.

The music video for "Ruri no Ame" features the band in a Japanese villa as heavy rain pours outside. The interior of the villa features a mix of design influences, with tatami and shōji as well as draperies, glass windows, shaded lamps, and elaborately woven chairs. Each member is shown holding different objects - Tora holding a calligraphy brush, Hiroto holding/playing the shamisen, Nao holding a colourful ball-like object and Saga holding an oil paper umbrella. Vocalist Shou sings to the song as it plays while the rest of the band remain motionless around the house while contemplating. The clip also shows a mysterious woman in a kimono, walking around the house and dancing while it rains.
