= I Scream Party =

EP by SuG
- Released: December 19, 2007
- Recorded: 2007
- Genre: Rock
- Length: 21:25 (CD); 23:10 (DVD)
- Label: PS Company

SuG chronology
I Scream Party (2007)	N0iz Star (2008)

I Scream Party (typeset often as I SCREAM PARTY) is the first EP by Sug, released December 19, 2007. It includes 5 tracks and DVD, which included the music video and making of footage for "Love Scream Party".

== Track listing ==
Disc one (CD)

1. Love Scream Party – 3:51
2. Toon Daily Late Show – 3:55
3. Genjou (幻燈) – 4:31
4. Oreshiki Continue (俺式 Continue) – 3:31
5. Primal (プライマル, Puraimaru) – 5:40

Disc two (DVD)

1. "Love Scream Party" – 4:00
2. "Making of Love Scream Party" – 19:10

== Music video ==
The video starts with a teenage girl dressed in Sweet Lolita fashion opening a door to a room. The song starts and the band plays their instruments and sings in Oshare Kei costumes as it is revealed that the girl has arrived at a party were five different boys (the band members in casual clothing) seem to have a crush on her. The song continues to play accompanied by scenes of the band playing, apparently as the entertainment at the party, close-ups Takeru singing, and the girl at the party rejecting various gifts the boys try to give her, causing the boys to give up on courting her and leave the party one by one. The video then briefly cuts to scenes to the band members in the middle of a crowded dance floor playing their instruments. The video switches back as all five boys return to the party and confront the girl at the same time, causing her to become embarrassed and leave the party with nothing. The boys all decide not to chase after her as the song ends. The video then cuts the band breaking the fourth wall and waving goodbye to the viewer as the screen fades to black.
