= Gr8 Story =

- Cover art of Reborn! version

Single by Sug
- Released: 27 January 2010
- Recorded: 2010
- Genre: Rock
- Length: 3:31
- Label: PS Company, Pony Canyon

Sug singles chronology
"Pink Masquerade" (2009)	"Gr8 Story" (2010)	"Koakuma Sparkling" (2010)

"Gr8 Story" (Great Story, typeset as gr8 story) is a single by Japanese visual kei rock band Sug. It is part of the album Tokyo Muzical Hotel, released on March 9, 2010. It is an ending theme of the Japanese anime Reborn! from episodes 166 to 178. The single peaked at number 13 on Oricon Singles Chart.

== Track list ==
1. Gr8 Story (gr8 story) (3:31)
2. Milk Tune (milk tune) (3:35)
3. GETG (G☆E☆T☆G) (3:37)

== Music video ==
The music video of "Gr8 Story" first shows an unknown person skateboarding in slow motion. The next scene shows Takeru, SuG's lead singer, walking out of an apartment and checking the mail box in oversized loungewear. He pulls out a folded news paper as the song starts and the man on the skateboard rides past him and grabs the news paper out of his hands before he can unfold it. The band is then shown playing their instruments and singing and a room with shining white wall wearing primarily white Oshare Kei costumes.

The room also has aspects of pop art, containing vividly colored furniture. The skateboarder is chased by Takeru around the apartment complex as he pranks the other band members, who apparently live in the same building and decide to chase him as well; he steals a carton of milk from Yuji, the backing guitarist, he pushes lead guitarist Masato, he interrupts bassist Chiyu's breakfast, and rips apart the pillows of Shinpei, the drummer, who is sleeping. The song plays showing various parts of the chase, during which the characters talk in speech bubbles with English words and onomatopoeia, the band playing their instruments in the white room, and Takeru alone singing while surrounded by speech bubbles filled with seemingly random English words and phrases.

Near the end of the song, Chiyu, who had been carrying a banana peel from a banana he had eaten during his breakfast, throws the peel ahead of the skateboarder, who slips and falls. As the song ends, the band crowds around the unconscious boarder, finds the news paper on his person, and finally see the front page, which is revealed to be announcing the band's new song as well as their major debut.
