= Shoxx =

Japanese music magazine

- Categories: Music
- Frequency: Monthly
- Publisher: Ongakusenkasha Co., Ltd.
- First issue: October 1990
- Final issue: November 2016
- Company: IDG
- Country: Japan
- Based in: Tokyo
- Language: Japanese
- Website: Official website

Shoxx (stylized as SHOXX) was a Japanese music magazine published monthly by Ongakusenkasha founded by Seiichi Hoshiko. It focused on Japan's visual kei scene, featuring its most popular bands as well as new ones. It is advertised as a "Visual and Hard Shock" magazine on each cover, a title that was influenced by visual kei pioneers X Japan and taken from their album Blue Blood.

Different artists were featured on the cover every month, along with a 20-page feature which covered them through in-depth profiles and interviews, and a poster of the cover star. Regularly featured bands included X Japan, Miyavi, Mucc, Nightmare, The Gazette, Kra, Sid, Kagrra, Alice Nine, An Cafe and LM.C, among others.

The magazine tended to appeal to overseas fans due to the large number of photos (often full-page) and advertisements included in each issue. It became more widely available as the popularity of Japanese music increased in the West.

In September 2016, it was announced that Shoxx had filed for bankruptcy. The final issue featured Sug, although Shoxx would later release one more special-edition magazine in February 2017 that featured Nightmare.
