= 2o Love to Sweet Bullet =

Japanese idol group

- Origin: Tokyo, Japan
- Genres: J-pop
- Years active: 2015–2025
- Labels: Firewall Div.; Sun-krad
- Members: Mihoko Yamahiro; Riho Fushimi; Izumi Kamiya; Karen Kurota; Mai Shinjou
- Past members: Kyoko Isshiki; Narumi Shiina; Mayu Nagaoka; Sachika Mizutani; Honomi Sakaguchi; Mayu Fukami; Kasumi Tachibana; Yume Ichinose; Shiho Fujino; Karin Mita; Chika Yoshizawa; Mitsuki Oozora; Yurika Matsumoto; Kirari Nakamura
- Website: sweetbullet.club

2o Love to Sweet Bullet is a Japanese girl group formed in 2015. They made their debut with the single, "Ai no Hana", in August 2015. They went on hiatus from March 2025.

== History ==
Originally formed in May 2014 as a three-member girl group under the name Sweet Bullet, the original members left in early 2015 and the group was renamed 2o Love to Sweet Bullet in March 2015 with a new line-up consisting of four members. 2o Love to Sweet Bullet released their debut single, "Ai no Hana" on August 19, 2015. Their second single, "Halloween no Special One", was released on September 30, followed by their third single, "Baby Kiss" on November 25.

Dynamite Tommy started producing music for the group in 2016.

In 2016, they released three singles: "Mirai no Shiawase", "Sotsugyō", and "Hibiyasen Diary". In 2017, they released their seventh single, "Sokode Sakende Watashi ni Oshiete Hoshī". In 2018, they released two singles: "Vega" and "Hitorijime Shitai".

In 2020, they released their debut album, 2020 ver., digitally.

They went on hiatus from March 2025 after being active for ten years.

== Members ==
Current

- Mihoko Yamahiro (山広美保子)
- Riho Fushimi (伏見莉穂)
- Izumi Kamiya (神谷泉水)
- Karen Kurota (黒田かれん)
- Mai Shinjo (新城まい)

Former

- Kyoko Isshiki (一色杏子)
- Narumi Shiina (椎名成美)
- Mayu Nagaoka (長岡真由)
- Sachika Mizutani (水谷幸果)
- Honomi Sakaguchi (坂口穂乃実)
- Mayu Fukami (深見真夕)
- Kasumi Tachibana (立花佳純)
- Yume Ichinose (一之瀬夢)
- Shiho Fujino (藤野志穂)
- Karin Mita (三田佳凛)
- Chika Yoshizawa (吉沢千佳)
- Mitsuki Oozora (大空美月)
- Yurika Matsumoto (松本ゆりか)
- Kirari Nakamura (仲村希星)

== Discography ==
=== Digital albums ===
Title	Album details
2020 ver.	Released: December 25, 2020; Label: Sun-krad; Formats: digital download

=== Singles ===
Title	Year	Peak chart positions		Album
Title	Year	Oricon	Billboard	Album
"Ai no Hana" (アイノハナ)	2015	—	—	2020 ver.
"Halloween no Special One" (ハロウィンのスペシャル☆ワン)	2015	—	—	2020 ver.
"Baby Kiss"	2015	—	—	2020 ver.
"Mirai no Shiawase" (未来の幸せ)	2016	—	—	2020 ver.
"Sotsugyō" (卒業)	2016	—	—	2020 ver.
"Hibiyasen Diary" (日比谷線ダイアリー)	2016	50	—	2020 ver.
"Sokode Sakende Watashi ni Oshiete Hoshī" (そこで叫んで私に教えてほしい)	2017	12	—	2020 ver.
"Vega"	2018	10	—	2020 ver.
"Hitorijime Shitai" (ひとりじめしたい)	2018	6	83	2020 ver.
"—" denotes releases that did not chart or were not released in that region.
