= Mirror Ball (song) =

Single by Alice Nine
- Released: March 26, 2008
- Recorded: January 2008
- Genre: Hard rock, pop rock
- Length: 13:44
- Label: PS Company, King

Alice Nine singles chronology
"Tsubasa" (2007)	"Mirror Ball" (2008)	"Rainbows" (2008)

"Mirror Ball" (typeset as MIRROR BALL) is a single by Alice Nine, released on March 26, 2008. The title track is the theme song of the live-action adaptation of collectible card game and anime Aquarian Age (specifically, one of the stories, Juvenile Orion), in which the band also appears.

The single was released in three versions: two limited editions and one regular edition. The limited editions contain a second B-side, "Kiseki", and an additional DVD with a single music video. The DVD for Type A includes the music video for "Mirror Ball," and the DVD for Type B includes the music video for "Eraser -Memoire d'une Fleur-."

The song "Eraser -Memoire d'une Fleur-" is a remade version of the song "Eraser" (イレイザー) from the band's Alpha album. The song "Mirror Ball" was later rearranged with piano accompaniment for the band's third album, Vandalize.

The single reached #6 on the Oricon weekly rankings, selling 13,801 copies in its first week.

== Development history ==
The song "Mirror Ball" came into conception before the release of Alice Nine's second album, Alpha. However, it did not become a full-fledged single until the director of the Aquarian Age film, who also directed the music video for the band's "Jewels" single, approached the band in request of a theme song for the movie.

After reading the film's script, the band decided that the theme for the song would be "human's light and shadow." The base concept for the song was then adjusted in accordance with this theme, and it reflects in the song's lyrics and title, as vocalist Shou stated, "The title, 'Mirror Ball,' is also one of my expressions of 'human's light and shadow'. A mirror ball can't shine by itself, it needs shadows to shine. I compared that to life."

== Track listing ==
Version 1 (promotional CD and DVD)

1. "Mirror Ball" – 4:42
2. "Kiseki" – 3:57 (奇跡; Miracle)
3. "Eraser -Memoire d'une Fleur-" – 5:07 (イレイザー -Memoire d'une Fleur-; Eraser -Memory of a flower-)
- "Mirror Ball" music video

Version 2 (CD and DVD)

1. "Mirror Ball" – 4:42
2. "Kiseki" – 3:57 (奇跡; Miracle)
3. "Eraser -Memoire d'une Fleur-" – 5:07 (イレイザー -Memoire d'une Fleur-; Eraser -Memory of a flower-)
- "Eraser -Memoire d'une Fleur-" music video

Version 3 (CD only)

1. "Mirror Ball" – 4:42
2. "Kiseki" – 3:57 (奇跡; Miracle)

== Music video ==
The "Mirror Ball" music video depicts the band performing their song in a mostly black room. A lot of the scenes are in slow motion and there is a water effect, with inches of water covering the floor, dripping from the ceiling, and splashing onto each member's instruments. In the background is a disco ball which is gold when the band is performing in a circle around it and changes to silver as they perform in front of it in the water.

The "Eraser -Memoire d'une Fleur-" music video has the band fully dressed in white, performing the song in some scenes while others have a single member of the band lying down, standing up, or sitting down on a flower bed. The music video shows some focus on singer Shou, who acts as a jaded prisoner with gray colored hair. As a prisoner, he watches a television on which the band performs, along with scenes of flowers and skylines.
