= Color (band) =

Japanese punk band

- Promotional photo of Color. Dynamite Tommy is in front, with Marry, Toshi, Cindy and Tatsuya behind him.

Background information
- Origin: Osaka, Japan
- Genre: Punk rock
- Years active: 1985–1997, 2003 and 2008 (reunion shows)
- Labels: Free-Will; Crown
- Members: Dynamite Tommy; Tatsuya; Cindy; Marry; Toshi

Color (stylized as COLOR) was a Japanese punk rock band formed in Osaka in 1985 by vocalist Dynamite Tommy, who founded the Free-Will record label a year later. They are considered to be important to the formation of visual kei, with the phrase "X of the East, Color of the West" (東のX、西のCOLOR) comparing the importance of the Kansai band to that of X Japan in Kantō. Their debut album Gekitotsu was named one of the top albums from 1989–1998 in a 2004 issue of the music magazine Band Yarouze.

== History ==
Color was formed Osaka, Japan in 1985 by vocalist Dynamite Tommy. In 1986, he formed the Free-Will record label, which published the band's first release, "Molt Grain" (1987). Their debut album, Gekitotsu, followed in January 1988. After releasing their second album Fools! Get Lucky!!, Color signed to Crown Records and released their only major studio album a couple months later, Ask the Angels. It is said that the label made the band rewrite the album's lyrics, which were originally in English, in Japanese to be more accessible by the mainstream. It seemed to have worked, as Ask the Angels reached number 16 on the Oricon Albums Chart and their popularity increased. However, in January 1990 at a concert on the album's tour, in their hometown of Osaka, a fan was accidentally stomped to death. The band decided to lie low and avoid media, they ended up losing their contract with Crown. During this hiatus, Tommy formed Sister's No Future with Ken-chan (Kamaitachi), while Marry started Goatcore with You Adachi (Dead End).

Color returned with a concert in August, and in July 1991 released the single "The Exhibition". They held a coupling tour with Genkaku Allergy in March 1993. In 1994 they released their last album, Galaxy, which has an electronic dance sound instead of their usual punk. In 1995 Color held what would be their last concert, after which the band disappeared without any announcement. The music magazine J-Rock published an article in 1997, labeling Color disbanded due to inactivity.

On June 14, 2002, bassist Marry died in a car accident. On the one-year anniversary of his death, the remaining members organized and performed at the first "Marry Memorial" concert. It has been held every year since then; Color reunited for the 2008 concert.

== Members ==
=== Final lineup ===
- Hiroshi "Dynamite Tommy" Tomioka – vocals (1985–1997, 2003, 2008, originally guitarist)
- Tatsuya Niimi – guitar (1986–1997, 2003, 2008)
- Cindy – guitar (1986–1997, 2003, 2008)
- Naotaka "Marry" Nakano – bass (1988–1997; died 2002)
- Toshi – drums (1988–1997, 2003, 2008)

=== Former members ===
- Iku – vocals (1985)
- Bell – bass (1985)
- Hide – drums (1985)
- Ikuo – bass (1986)
- Hideki – drums (1986)
- Takahashi – drums (1986–1988)
- Remmy – bass (1987–1988), support bass on June 14, 2008
- Den – support bass on June 14, 2003 (former roadie, By-Sexual, Zigzo)

== Discography ==
=== Singles ===
- "Molt Grain" (March 23, 1987)
- "Sandbag Baby I" (November 23, 1988)
- "Sandbag Baby II" (November 26, 1988)
- "Broken Tavern" (June 6, 1989) Oricon Singles Chart Peak Position: No. 65
- "Back Tonight 5th Moon" (February 21, 1990) No. 27
- "Some Become Stranger" (August 21, 1990) No. 31
- "The Exhibition" (July 21, 1991)

=== Studio albums ===
- Gekitotsu (激突; January 21, 1988)
- Fools! Get Lucky!! (March 8, 1989)
- Ask the Angels (December 5, 1989) Oricon Albums Chart Peak Position: No. 16
- Cherry's World (July 31, 1992)
- Galaxy (October 1994)

=== Other albums ===
- Extremism: Best of Color (March 16, 1991, compilation album) No. 43
- Color Live! Shock Treatment and Rebirth (August 21, 1991, live album) No. 98
- Remind (December 25, 1992, self-cover album)
- The Best (December 16, 1996, compilation album)
- Memoir 5 (回顧録5; September 14, 2005, tribute album)

=== Videos ===
- Shock Treatment (October 7, 1989)
- Overwhelming Superiority (May 21, 1990)
- Rebirth (大復活; December 16, 1990)
- Land of Revolution (May 21, 1991)
- The Exhibition (July 17, 1991, freely distributed at Kawasaki Club live)
