= Jewels (song) =

Single by alice nine.

from the album Alpha
- Released: March 21, 2007
- Recorded: 2007
- Genre: Pop rock, power pop
- Length: 4:47
- Label: PS Company, King Records
- Songwriter: alice nine.
- Producer: alice nine.

Alice nine. singles chronology
"Number Six" (2006)	"Jewels" (2007)	"White Prayer" (2007)

"Jewels" (typeset as JEWELS) is the title of the eighth physical and ninth overall maxi single from alice nine. It was officially released on March 21, 2007. Two versions of the single were released, one a regular edition, with three tracks, the other a limited edition with two tracks, but a bonus music video of Jewels in place of the missing track. Jewels was the first alice nine. song to generally receive good reviews from mainstream Japan and marked a change of lead singer Shous' vocal capacity. Jewels was also released on November 28, 2007, on alice nine.'s second album Alpha. It is one of four singles that were previously released to be on Alpha, the others include, NUMBER SIX, White Prayer and the digital download only Blue Planet.

== Track listing ==
Version 1 (promotional CD)

1. "JEWELS" – 4:47
2. "ROSARIO"
3. "13"

Version 2 (limited edition CD)

1. "JEWELS" – 4:47
2. "ROSARIO"
3. "JEWELS" music video

== Music video ==
The Jewels music video starts off with scenes of a woman lying on a bed of flowers and then cuts to scenes with the band playing in a completely black area. Some scenes emphasize a story between a man and a woman who no longer look at each other how they used to, with flashbacks of how it used to be. Other scenes are close ups of the bands faces and a guitar solo. Also, at first the music video is of low saturation, but towards the end, a light hits the camera and the colors become more saturated.
