= 39Galaxyz =

"39GalaxyZ"

Single by Sug
- Released: 15 April 2009
- Recorded: 2009
- Genre: Rock, pop
- Length: 4:00
- Label: PS Company
- Songwriter(s): Takeru & Masato

Sug singles chronology
"Toriko Roll-Caller" (2008)	"39GalaxyZ" (2009)	"Life 2Die" (2009)

"39GalaxyZ" is the fifth single Released by Japanese visual kei band Sug, which was released 15 April 2009. The single included two tracks in the regular edition and a music video for the lead title track. This was their last single with drummer Mitsuru in the band, after he left on 9 May 2009. Mitsuru was then replaced by Shinpei.

== Music video ==
The promotional video for "39GalaxyZ" starts off with the band tapping their shoes on the ground to the beat of the song. This is then followed by the band playing their instruments and singing in a bright colourful room. Next, a pink rabbit and a lion are seen playing basketball. The rabbit loses the first game, with the lion celebrating his win. The band is then seen playing their instruments and singing again. The video then ends with the band cheering on the rabbit in the last game of basketball, after the rabbit wins, the band, cheerleaders, the lion and the rabbit all celebrate with confetti falling from above.

== Track listing ==
No.	Title	Lyrics	Music	Length
1.	"39GalaxyZ"	Takeru	Takeru	4:11
2.	"V.I.P Goblinz"	Takeru	masato	4:27
3.	"VAMP VAMP VAMP" (Limited edition track)	Takeru	Takeru	4:06
Total length:				12:44
