= Isshi =

- Birth name: 塩原一志 (Shinohara Hitoshi)
- Also known as: Isshi
- Born: December 7, 1978; Matsumoto, Nagano, Japan
- Died: July 18, 2011 (aged 32); Tokyo, Japan
- Genres: Rock
- Occupation: Musician
- Instrument: Vocals
- Years active: 1998–2011

Isshi (一志, December 7, 1978 – July 18, 2011) was a Japanese musician and vocalist of Japanese visual kei rock band Kagrra,.

== History ==
In 1998, along with musicians Izumi and Nao, he founded a Visual Kei rock band called Crow. Two years later, they signed to PS Company and changed the band's name to Kagrra,. He wrote most of the lyrics for the band, often using ancient kanji characters not used in modern Japanese writing. In 2011, after the band's "demise," Isshi began working solo on shiki∞project. He was found dead in his Tokyo apartment at age 32.
