= Seth et Holth =

1993 Japanese film

- VHS cover
- Written by: Hideaki Utsumi; Hide (original story)
- Produced by: Hideaki Utsumi
- Starring: Hide; Tusk
- Music by: Hide; Tusk
- Distributed by: King Video
- Release date: September 29, 1993
- Running time: 45 minutes
- Country: Japan
- Language: Japanese

Seth et Holth is a Japanese film released on September 29, 1993, and starring musicians Hide and Tusk. The film is based on an original short story by Hide and features the tragic plot of two beings from a different plane of existence coming to earth, specifically Tokyo, and being overwhelmed by the city' sensory overload. The two communicate through swapping blood, and are persecuted and executed.

== Plot ==
In the sphere of Athum there once lived two beautiful angels by the names of Seth and Holth. Seth was gentle, kind, and anxious one; Holth was strong, determined, and bold. They lived in peace in the sphere of Athum for eternity, since there is no time, nor age, nor decay in this world. The waters flow uphill and time is irrelevant. Athum takes all and creates everything, for eternity. The angels Seth and Holth lived there undisturbed forever. They made love by their eyes, tasting their tears, they spoke to each other by their blood. They slept in Athum's womb not knowing of any evil, plight or fear. No worry, no pain ever harmed them... and they could have gone on like this forever, if not one day bold Holth had started to ask questions... questions about other worlds, other beings, questions about life and death.

He tried to force Athum to tell him but instead for an answer the angels Seth and Holth were banished to planet Earth, thrown into the harshness of light, noise and madness. They woke up from their eternal dream to find themselves reborn to a world full of questions; hectic and evil. Not knowing what to do, only trying to get home again, home to Athum, home to peace.

Hunted down by humans who did not understand, nor ever loved, Seth and Holth were sacrificed and murdered. Seeing their plight in the human world Athum pitied them and allowed them to return home, but home was not the same anymore. They had seen too much, heard too much, felt too much in the human world. They lost their innocence and their faith, they could ignore the questions no longer.

== Cast ==
- Hide from X Japan as Seth
- Tusk from Zi:Kill as Holth

== Production ==
Tusk explained that Seth et Holth originated from a photo shoot he and Hide agreed to do together for the magazine Shoxx. Feeling it would be a waste to only do photos, Hide suggested they make a movie, and people from the magazine Fool's Mate showed up the next day. Tusk said he learned decades later that it was Fool's Mate who funded the film and that they spent a lot of money on it.

Seth or Set is an Egyptian god. Holth may be Horus, if pronounced as the Japanese would, but with incorrect romanization.

== Credits ==
- Planning and basic conception: Hide and Tusk
- Music composition: Hide
- Lyrics & vocals: Tusk
- Producer/Script: Hideaki Utsumi (Fool's Mate)
- Co-producer: Takahiro Ishii (Fool's Mate)

== Soundtrack ==
1. "Eyes"
2. "Descent to Earth"
3. "Crosses Everywhere"
4. "The Church"
5. "Running ~Persecution"
6. "Sacrifice ~Death"
7. "Ending Theme ~Music Box"
