= Dynamite Tommy =

Japanese musician and record producer

- Born: Hiroshi Tomioka; 14 September 1964 (age 61)
- Origin: Hyōgo Prefecture, Japan
- Genres: Punk rock
- Occupations: Musician; record producer; manager
- Instruments: Vocals; guitar; bass
- Years active: 1985–present
- Label: Free-Will
- Formerly of: Color; Sister's No Future; The Killing Red Addiction

Hiroshi Tomioka (Japanese: 冨岡裕, Hepburn: Tomioka Hiroshi), better known by his stage name Dynamite Tommy, is a Japanese musician, record producer and businessman. He first rose to prominence as vocalist of the punk rock band Color in the late-1980s and early-1990s, but now predominantly works behind the scenes running his record label Free-Will.

== Career ==
Dynamite Tommy formed the punk rock band Color in 1985, for which he was initially the guitarist before quickly taking over the role of vocalist. In 1986, Tommy formed the independent record label Free-Will to distribute his band's work. It is one of two labels credited with helping to spread Japan's visual kei movement. It has also been a major contributor in spreading modern visual kei outside Japan.

During a break in Color activities in 1992, Tommy teamed up with Kenzi of the recently disbanded Kamaitachi to form Sister's No Future. In 1998, Tommy produced La'Mule's major label debut album, Inspire.

In 2008, Tommy wrote and directed the music film Attitude, with various Japanese rock artists from the 1970s–1990s appearing as themselves. Tommy called in Taiji and Tatsu (Gastunk) to help with the film's music and, after later recruiting Kenzi, this led to the creation of The Killing Red Addiction. The group made its debut at the Whisky a Go Go in Los Angeles on 22 June 2009. They released a cover of Gastunk's "Devil" on iTunes on 13 January 2010.

Artists produced by Tommy include Dir En Grey, Phantasmagoria, Miyavi, and The Gazette. He has also been involved in the formation of fashion brands DIRT (produced by Toshiya of Dir En Grey) and KOMACHI 2266531 Dark Lolita (a Gothic Lolita line designed by Dada of Velvet Eden). He also wrote the screenplay to Miyavi's film Oresama and produced the 2001 anime adaptation of Grappler Baki.

In 2016, Tommy started producing the idol group 2o Love to Sweet Bullet. It is composed of eight young girls with an average age of 16.

== Personal life ==
Despite having been in the business for over three decades, Tommy has said that he does not even like music, explaining that he only enjoys the dynamics of being in a band. In 2016, he stated that he has no plans to return to musical activities. As a big fan of soccer, Tommy has obtained a level-2 coaching license and founded the UEFA Style Football Academy for children in Tamagawa. In December 2024, Tommy passed the high school equivalency test and proclaimed that he wanted to attend university next.

== Discography ==
With Color

With Sister's No Future

- "Sonic Beat" (21 January 1992)
- Sister's No Future I Demonstration (21 February 1992)
- "So, So Long My Honey So Long" (21 July 1992)
- "Oretachiniasuhanai" (俺達に明日はない; 21 October 1992)
- Thrill Show (21 October 1992)
- "Long Time No See" (as Sister's No Future Super Deluxe)
- T.G.I.F (23 August 1995, as Sister's No Future Super Deluxe)
- Mind Park (21 October 1996, as Sister's No Future Max)

With The Killing Red Addiction

- "Devil" (13 January 2010)
