= Alice in Pictures I =

Video by Alice Nine
- Released: 2008
- Genre: Rock

Alice in Pictures I is a compilation DVD from Japanese rock band Alice Nine. It features music videos from Alice Nine's early years, and includes the first ever DVD release of the "Shunkashuutou" music video. It was released in July 2008, alongside Alice in Pictures II.

== Track list ==
1. "Gin no Tsuki Kuroi Hoshi"
2. "Yami ni Chiru Sakura"
3. "Yuri wa Aoku Saite"
4. "Shunkashuutou"
5. "Kowloon – Nine Heads Rodeo Show-"
6. "Fantasy"
7. "Velvet"
8. "Number Six."
