= Rainbows (Alice Nine song) =

Single by Alice Nine
- Released: August 6, 2008
- Recorded: June 2008
- Genre: Hard rock, pop rock
- Label: PS Company, King

Alice Nine singles chronology
"Mirror Ball" (2008)	"Rainbows" (2008)	"Cross Game" (2008)

"Rainbows" is the 13th maxi single by Alice Nine. It was released on August 6, 2008 in three different versions. Each version contains the title track and a B-side, which may include a booklet, a music video, or another bonus track, respectively within the three versions. The single marks a significant change in the band's overall dress style which no longer resembles their original Visual Kei look.

In Japan, the single went straight to #3 on the Oricon daily charts, selling over 3,500 copies on its first day and marking their highest position on a mainstream Japanese music chart to date. On the Oricon weekly charts, it ranked at #6, having sold a total of 15,921 copies during its first week.

== Development history ==
=== RAINBOWS ===
The title track was conceptualized by bassist Saga during a period in which the band members were creating songs without an overall motif. An early version of "Rainbows" was chosen out of a total of 17 songs from this period.

Saga mentions in an interview with Shoxx Magazine that the song's early sound had strong electronic influences at first, which faded as the band introduced and increased live instrumentation during production. Another characteristic that contributed to a more mechanical sound was a drum loop, but this was eventually replaced with live drum work as well.

For the lyrics, vocalist Shou envisioned an image of the band playing in a laser beam-filled disco after listening to the demo tape and created the theme of "shouting strongly from the darkness to the light" from there. The symbol for this theme was eventually realized as a rainbow.

=== Strawberry Fuzz, Kochouran ===
Guitarist Hiroto handled songwriting duties for the following songs on the single, with different approaches to each. "Strawberry Fuzz" came to life as a song that he wanted to perform live, while "Kochouran" pushed him to search for female vocals, bringing an R&B feel to the song.

The titles for each song came about as themes pervading their lyrics. Shou explains the title of "Strawberry Fuzz" as a symbol for the embarrassment that a person experiences when they begin to pursue a dream. He chose the color pink to represent this, which in turn led to the word "strawberry." The "fuzz" of the title refers to hiding this intent from others. For "Kochouran," he elaborates that the theme is "people’s weaknesses and inferiority complexes about beauty," which came to be represented by flowers and butterflies.

== Track listing ==
Version 1 (CD and booklet)

1. "RAINBOWS."
2. "Strawberry Fuzz" (ストロベリー ファズ)
- A 40-page supplementary booklet and a slipcase

Version 2 (CD and DVD) (Limited Edition)

1. "RAINBOWS."
2. "Strawberry Fuzz" (ストロベリー ファズ)
- "Rainbows" music video

Version 3 (CD only)

1. "RAINBOWS."
2. "Strawberry Fuzz" (ストロベリー ファズ)
3. "Kochouran" (胡蝶蘭; Butterfly Orchid)

== Music video ==
The music video for Rainbows shows the band on the walkway-like stage lit with fluorescent lights on the ceiling and floor. The band appears in mostly bright, casual street clothing, with vocalist Shou even appearing in white Shutter Shades. The video often "glitches" at various points: pausing when the scene changes, stuttering, rewinding for a few seconds, or speeding up.

A making-of documentary aired with a live interview on Yahoo! Japan also shows a common video trick in which the band performs to a slowed-down version of the song, and the footage is later sped up. This results in the band members moving faster while maintaining lip-synching at normal speed.
