= Zi:Kill =

Japanese rock band

- Also known as: G-Kill
- Origin: Kanagawa, Japan
- Genres: Gothic rock; punk rock; hard rock
- Years active: 1987–1994
- Labels: Ghost Disc; Extasy; Toshiba-EMI/Planet Earth; King
- Members: Ken; Seiichi; Tusk; Eby
- Past members: Masami; Yukihiro; Tetsu

Zi:Kill (stylized as ZI:KILL or ZI÷KILL) was a Japanese rock band active from 1987 to 1994. The core members were guitarist Ken, bassist Seiichi and vocalist Tusk. With their three major label studio albums reaching the top ten on the Oricon chart, Zi:Kill are regarded as an important act from the then-emerging visual kei scene. With a dark musical style that incorporates British gothic rock and punk, they pioneered the decadent aesthetics and black-clad image of visual kei. Zi:Kill were featured in a chapter of Karl Taro Greenfeld's novel Speed Tribes that documents the writer's time spent with the band and the events that nearly caused their break up.

== History ==
=== Early years and rise: 1987–1991 ===
G-Kill was formed in Kanagawa Prefecture in November 1987 by guitarist Ken and bassist Seiichi. Seiichi said Ken approached him about doing something together when he performed at the Yokohama music venue that Ken worked at part-time. They were joined by former Aura drummer Masami, and later vocalist Tusk completed the first lineup in February 1988. Ken had recommended Masami, while Seiichi invited Tusk, who was from his hometown and about to graduate high school. According to Tusk, a friend of Ken's named Hase had sang with the band before he joined, but he noted that might have been simply to help them write original songs. Their first show was an audition performance at Meguro Rock-May-Kan in April 1988. Tusk recalled that they started to find an audience after only three months of playing, thanks to Ken's insistence at being booked with famous bands, such as Kamaitachi and Mazeran. He said that, at this time, they considered themselves "power metal", which was used to describe bands such as Saver Tiger, D'erlanger and Dementia, with a sound comparable to Metallica and Anthrax.

The band changed their name to "Zi:Kill" in 1989. That March, they released their first album, Shin Sekai ~Real of the World~, on the record label Ghost Disc. It reached number four on the independent music charts. Tusk explained that, as they were putting the record together, principal songwriter Ken suddenly decided on a change in musical direction, and they discarded their power metal songs in order to make a punk rock album. A flexi disc of the song "Karei" was distributed for free at the album's release concerts in Tokyo, Nagoya and Osaka that month. After a May 3 concert at Meguro Live Station, Masami left the group. New drummer Yukihiro joined that same month when the band aggressively approached him after seeing him perform live. Shin Sekai was reissued on July 21, this time distributed by Extasy Records and with "Karei" as an extra track on the CD version. Although it is often stated that X Japan guitarist and former Saver Tiger leader Hide discovered Zi:Kill and introduced them to his X bandmate and Extasy founder Yoshiki, this is not true. In actuality, Seiichi had become acquainted with someone who worked at Extasy and who arranged for him and Tusk to hand Yoshiki a video tape of live footage, before Hide started attending their concerts.

Zi:Kill's first album proved to be successful and they became one of the more popular groups in Japan's emerging visual kei scene. They distributed a flexi disc of "Tero" for free at the Live On Stage Vol. 2 concert at MZA Ariake in August 1989. The band did the same with "Last This Time" at the Who's Generation concert at Hibiya Open-Air Concert Hall, and with "Real of the World" at the Extasy Summit ~Jōgai Rantō-hen~ event at Shibuya Public Hall, both in September. Extasy released Zi:Kill's second album Close Dance in March 1990. The album was an even greater success; after being initially planned for March 1, it was pushed to March 25 after receiving 35,000 pre-orders, and topped Oricon's indies chart. Tickets for the band's October 10 show at Shibuya Public Hall sold out within an hour of going on sale. There, they announced their signing with major record label Toshiba EMI, who also gave the band their own label, Planet Earth.

After a small tour Zi:Kill went to London, where they worked on their major label debut. The group had become known for infighting within the band, and upon completing the album, Yukihiro was fired at a December 28, 1990, gig at Club Citta Kawasaki. The band's third album and major debut, Desert Town, became their breakthrough when it was released on March 20, 1991. It reached the top ten on the Oricon chart, and its single "Lonely" sold 40,000 copies. In 2004, Desert Town was named one of the top albums from 1989 to 1998 in an issue of the music magazine Band Yarouze. Zi:Kill recruited former D'erlanger drummer Tetsu in March 1991, and started the album's sold-out nationwide tour.

However, the band began a bitter dispute with their management company that eventually led to them leaving Toshiba EMI, and Tusk was hospitalized with tonsillitis in August. Several tour dates had to be cancelled as a result. On September 24, 1991, Tetsu announced he was leaving the group. The single "Hero" was released three days later, with Sceana of Kamaitachi providing backing vocals on the B-side "Your Face". "Hero" is the band's only studio recording to feature Tetsu. After this chain of negative events, Zi:Kill considered disbanding. Their first home video, the concert video Desert Town Tour 1991, was released in October and reached number two on the Oricon charts.

=== Regrouping and final years: 1992–1994 ===
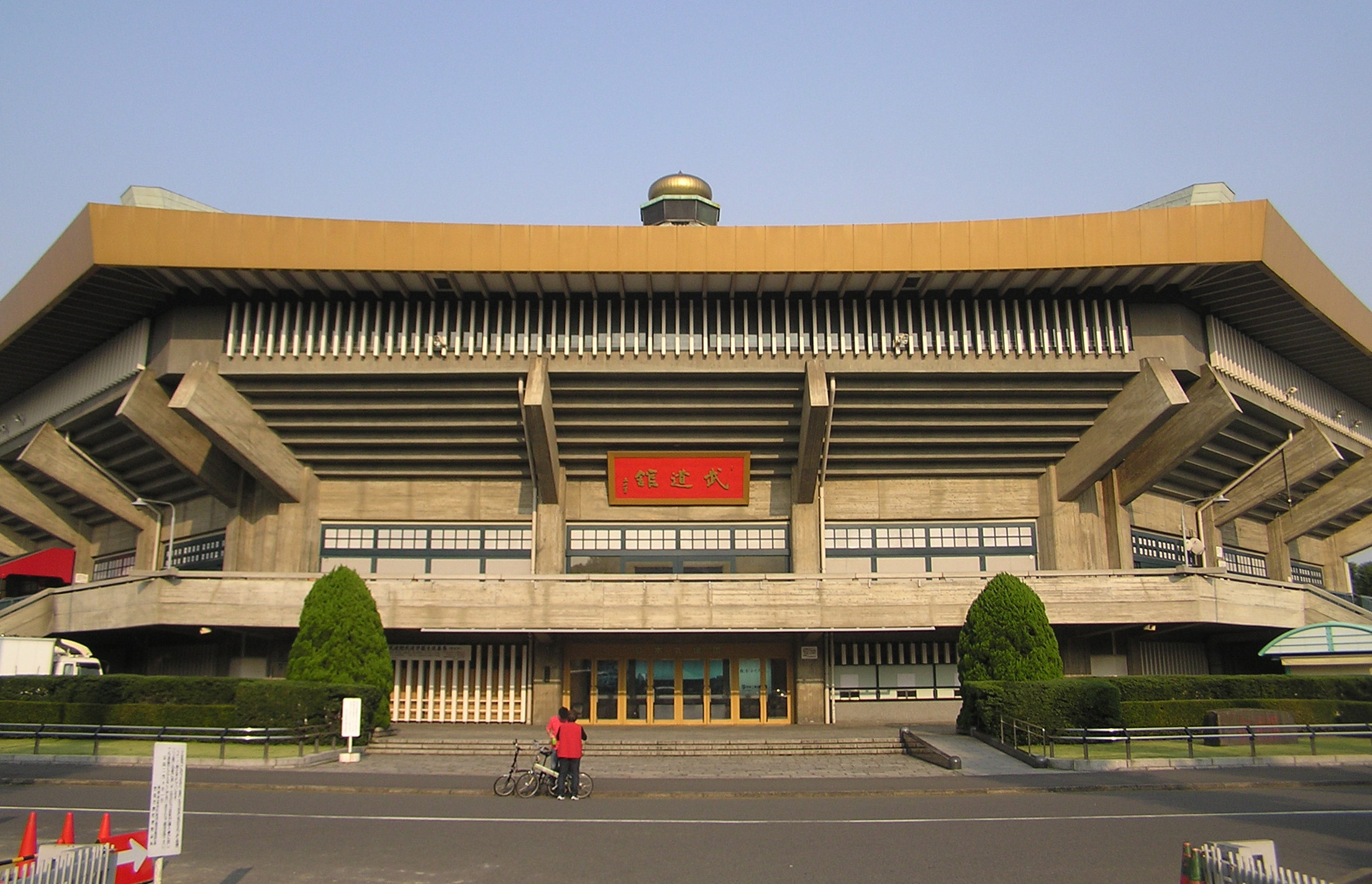
Zi:Kill performed their last concert in January 1994 at the Nippon Budokan.

In January 1992, Zi:Kill announced they had resumed activity with new drummer Eby. Their "comeback" concert took place at NHK Hall on July 30. As free agents, they collaborated with Extasy Records on a history compilation album of songs from their indie albums, plus "Hero" and the new songs "Crack Eye" and "Don't Ask Me!". Tomorrow... was released in July and hit number 34 on the Oricon chart, a success for an indies album. In retaliation, Toshiba EMI released its own Zi:Kill compilation album, Disgrace - The Best, two months later.

After signing with King Records, the single "Slow Down" and the album In the Hole were produced by Hoppy Kamiyama and both released in October 1992. The latter reached the number eight position on Oricon's albums chart. After another national tour, Zi:Kill appeared at Extasy Records' Extasy Summit at the Osaka-jō Hall and Nippon Budokan. They held their own concert at the Budokan on December 17, 1992, under the title Open the Gate ~ Tengoku no Kaidan. It was recorded and released as a live concert video in March 1993, which topped the Oricon video chart.

Tusk later cited May 1993's Fastest Lap Circuit Tour as the best time in the band, stating that everyone, including the record company and road crew, worked in unison and describing the live shows as feeling like a real "rock band". For the recording of June 1993's Rocket, Zi:Kill went back to London. Ranking fifth on the Oricon, it marks their highest chart appearance. The single "Calling", released the following month, was also a success, being used as "Tony's Theme" in the anime Fatal Fury 2: The New Battle. Tusk also starred in the September 1993 art film Seth et Holth, alongside Hide of X Japan. Zi:Kill released the home video Video Rocket London Side in November, and followed it with Video Rocket Tokyo Side in December.

After a nationwide tour titled Flying Rocket 1993, they performed at the Nippon Budokan again on January 11, 1994. This ended up being their last performance, as Zi:Kill unceremoniously announced their disbandment on March 7, 1994. The decision to disband was made days after the concert, with no member objecting. Tusk reportedly consoled their fan club members by stating, "Zi:Kill was just a rock band." Their final concert was released as the two-VHS set Live Rocket in March 1994.

Looking back on their disbandment in 2021, Tusk revealed that Ken had created demos for a follow-up to Rocket, but the singer felt they were not any good. He speculated that the musical bond amongst the band members had started to fall apart, but that their age and the music scene of the time also had something to do with it, and said he was the one who suggested the break up. Seiichi recalled that he personally wanted to take a break from the hectic schedule of a band and focus on his personal life. When asked about the prospect of a Zi:Kill reunion, Seiichi expressed concern about meeting audience expectations due to their ages, but said he was open to festival performances, while Tusk expressed both indifference and ambivalence, saying he did not really care either way, but might agree if it sounded like fun.

=== Post Zi:Kill ===
Ken went on to release a number of solo efforts, featuring ex-Zi:Kill drummers Yukihiro and Eby. He also formed the band Vast, who quickly changed their name to Crybaby, but is currently a studio musician and producer. Eby also works a session musician, having held supporting roles with Bellzlleb, Shazna and Gackt. In 2012, he formed the band Lizard's Tail with former Aion and Justy-Nasty singer Kenichi Fujisaki. They changed their name to Bordeaux in 2014, before disbanding in 2017. That same year, the two formed Krishna Blue. On September 22, 2013, Eby performed in a special band with Pata, Sex George (Ladies Room), Yoshihiko (heidi.) and Cutt, at a concert in memory of Hide.

Yukihiro went on to form prominent 90's rock band Die in Cries, active from 1991 to 1995. Since 1998, he has been the drummer for L'Arc-en-Ciel, one of the best-selling music acts in Japan. In 2001 he formed his solo project Acid Android, and formed the supergroup Petit Brabancon in 2021. In 1994, ex-drummer Tetsu formed the short-lived band Body with his fellow ex-D'erlanger member Cipher. In 1995, Seiichi teamed up with them both to form Craze with Fujisaki.

Tusk initially began a solo career, with Tetsu and Kyoji Yamamoto of Bow Wow supporting him on 1996's "3 Songs", his only solo release. He then formed The Slut Banks that same year with Ziggy bassist Norio Toshiro, who also played on "3 Songs", and Bow Wow drummer Toshihiro Niimi. They released four albums between 1996 and 2000, when the group disbanded as Tusk left the band. Tusk then joined Seiichi and Tetsu in Craze in 2000. He left them in 2005, and began performing as an acoustic solo act under the name Shinjuku Shin'on Kai Itaya Tusk (新宿心音会板谷祐). On New Years Eve 2007, The Slut Banks reunited.

In 2006, Craze ended activities. Seiichi joined Nakada Band, who later changed their name to The Heavenly Curve, with former members of Deep and By-Sexual drummer Nao. 2007 brought the revival of D'erlanger, and Tetsu rejoined accordingly. Also in 2007, Seiichi formed Vez with Yana (Zeppet Store), Asaki (Age of Punk, Bug, ex-Guniw Tools) and Futoshi Takagi (Bad Six Babies, ex-Hate Honey). He formed Johnny Loves Brautigan in 2010, Oxymorphonn in 2019, and joined Genkaku in 2022.

== Music and legacy ==
With their dark music that incorporates British gothic rock and punk, Showgun Fuyu of the music website Real Sound wrote that Zi:Kill pioneered the decadent aesthetics and black-clad image of visual kei. Seiichi said that the band members listened to a variety of music and suggested their sound mixed it all together. They liked the Sex Pistols and intense Japanese bands such as Loudness, dark UK acts like Bauhaus and The Cure, and also Tsuyoshi Nagabuchi. Ken listed Ziggy Stardust-era David Bowie, Hide of Saver Tiger, Hisashi Imai of Buck-Tick and Tatsu of Gastunk as his favorite musicians. Tusk was known for having a variety of different vocal styles, with photographer Saori Tsuji, who took the cover photo of the band's first album, remarking that he had great individuality and his voice itself was like an instrument. Cali Gari guitarist Ao Sakurai cited Zi:Kill as an influence on every aspect of his career. Fanatic Crisis vocalist Tsutomu Ishizuki and Dir En Grey guitarist Kaoru both cited Zi:Kill as one of their favorite bands. Miya said he created Mucc's 2025 song "Round & Round" as an homage to Zi:Kill. He has also performed in a Zi:Kill tribute session with Deadman, who have also expressed their love for the band.

== Members ==
Final lineup

- Ken Matsudaira (松平健) – guitar (1987–1994)
- Seiichi Iida (飯田成一) – bass (1987–1994)
- Tusk Itaya (板谷祐) – vocals (1988–1994)
- Makoto "Eby" Ebina (海老名淳) – drums (1992–1994)

Former members

- Masami – drums (1988–1989)
- Yukihiro – drums (1989–1990)
- Tetsu Kikuchi (菊地哲) – drums (1991)

== Discography ==
Studio albums

- Shin Sekai ~Real of the World~ (真世界〜REAL OF THE WORLD〜; March 21, 1989)
- Close Dance (March 25, 1990)
- Desert Town (March 20, 1991), Oricon Albums Chart Peak Position: No. 10
- In the Hole (October 28, 1992) No. 8
- Rocket (June 9, 1993) No. 5

Other albums

- Tomorrow... (July 29, 1992, history compilation)
- Disgrace - The Best (September 30, 1992, greatest hits compilation) No. 71
- Best Box (March 16, 1995, greatest hits compilation) No. 16
- Early Best - Final I (September 27, 1995, live album) No. 73
- Still Alive - The Best I (September 3, 1999, greatest hits compilation)

Singles

- "Lonely" (March 6, 1991), Oricon Singles Chart Peak Position: No. 14
- "Hero" (September 27, 1991) No. 26
- "Slow Down" (October 21, 1992) No. 24
- "Calling" (July 21, 1993) No. 51

Also on the Fatal Fury 2: The New Battle soundtrack as "Tony's Theme"

- "Hero" (August 23, 1995, remix versions) No. 70

Others

- "Karei" (華麗; March 9, 1989)

Flexi disc distributed for free at commemorative concerts for their debut album.

- "Tero" (August 2, 1989)

Flexi disc distributed for free at the Live On Stage Vol. 2 concert.

- "Last This Time" (September 2, 1989)

Flexi disc distributed for free at the Who's Generation concert.

- "Real of the World" (September 28, 1989)

Flexi disc distributed for free at the Extasy Summit ~Jōgai Rantō-hen~ concert.

- "Another Side of Rocket" (March 1994)

Nine-track cassette tape given to fan club members.

Various artists compilations

- Emergency Express Metal Warning 2 (1989, "Yūutsu")
- History of Extasy 15th Anniversary (June 21, 2000, "Tero" and "I 4 U")

Home videos

- Desert Town Tour 1991 (October 9, 1991)
- 1992 Open the Gate ~ Tengoku no Kaidan (1992 OPEN THE GATE〜天国の階段; VHS: March 17, 1993; DVD: April 4, 2001)
- Video Rocket London Side (VHS: November 26, 1993; DVD: April 4, 2001)
- Video Rocket Tokyo Side (December 22, 1993)
- Live Rocket (VHS: March 16, 1994; DVD: April 4, 2001)
- First and Second Step at Budokan (September 2, 1994)

Photobook

- A Piece of Road (July 1993)
