= Supernova (Alice Nine album) =

Studio album by Alice Nine
- Released: March 19, 2014
- Genre: Pop rock; electronic rock
- Length: 41:57
- Language: japanese
- Label: Universal Music Japan

Alice Nine chronology
9 (2018)	Supernova (2014)	Ideal (2017)

Supernova is the sixth studio album by Japanese rock band Alice Nine. It was released on March 19, 2014, in two editions: the regular edition containing only the CD and the limited edition containing the CD and a DVD. Supernova peaked at the 39th position on the Oricon Albums Chart.

== Track listing ==
No.	Title	Length
1.	"Shining"	3:49
2.	"+-"	3:33
3.	"Seven"	3:23
4.	"Möbius" (メビウス)	3:50
5.	"Daybreak"	3:53
6.	"Shooting Star"	4:34
7.	"Exist"	3:25
8.	"1 Minute Kidding"	0:58
9.	"Kid"	3:18
10.	"Shadowplay"	4:01
11.	"Kaisenzenya" (開戦前夜)	4:05
12.	"Prelude -resolution-"	2:26
Total length:		41:57

Limited edition DVD
No.	Title	Length
1.	"Seven Music Video"
2.	"Seven Music Video (Show Version)"
3.	"Seven Music Video (Hiroto Version)"
4.	"Seven Music Video (Tora Version)"
5.	"Seven Music Video (Saga Version)"
6.	"Seven Music Video (Nao Version)"

== Personnel ==
- Shou (将) – vocal
- Hiroto (ヒロト) – guitar
- Tora (虎) – guitar
- Saga (沙我) – bass
- Nao (ナオ) – drums
