= Number Six (song) =

Single by Alice Nine

from the album Alpha
- Released: October 4, 2006
- Recorded: 2006
- Genre: Pop rock
- Length: 5:38
- Label: Free-Will, PS Company
- Songwriter: Tora
- Producer: Tora

Alice Nine singles chronology
"Blue Planet" (2006)	"Number Six" (2006)	"Jewels" (2007)

"Number Six" is single by Alice Nine It was released on October 4, 2006, coinciding with the release of "Blue Planet".

"Number Six" was created as a small film. The regular edition had an audio of "Number Six", the music video and the making-of the film, while the limited edition had the music video for "Number Six", the small film, and the making of the film. The making of from the regular edition, was different from the making of from the limited-edition version.

"Number Six" is also one of four previously released singles released with Alice Nines' second album, Alpha.

== Track listing ==
=== Regular edition ===
All tracks are written by Tora.

Regular edition
No.	Title	Length
1.	"Number Six" (Music video)
2.	"Number Six"	5:38
3.	"Making of Number Six"

Limited edition DVD release
No.	Title	Length
1.	"Number Six" (Music video)
2.	"Number Six" (Short film version of the music video)
3.	"Making of Number Six"

== Music video ==
The music video was written, produced, and directed by guitarist Tora. It incorporates scenes from the mini movie to that of with the band playing the music.
