= White Prayer =

Single by alice nine.

from the album White Prayer [Single], later released with the Alpha album
- Released: June 6, 2007
- Recorded: 2007
- Genre: Pop rock, power pop
- Length: 4:01
- Label: Free-Will, PS Company
- Songwriter(s): alice nine.
- Producer(s): alice nine.

Alice nine. singles chronology
"Jewels" (2007)	"White Prayer" (2007)	"Tsubasa" (2007)

"White Prayer" is the 9th physical single and 10th overall maxi single from Alice Nine. It was officially released on June 6, 2007.

The single was released in two versions: a limited edition and a regular edition. The limited edition features two songs, "White Prayer" and "Stray Cat," as well as a DVD with the music video for "White Prayer." The regular edition does not include the DVD but features a bonus track, "The Last Empire."

White Prayer is also one in four songs to be included in Alice Nine's second album Alpha and was released November 28, 2007. White Prayer peaked at #11 on the Japanese Oricon weekly charts, and peaked at #12 on the daily Oricon charts.

== Track listing ==
Version 1 (CD and DVD)

1. "WHITE PRAYER" – 4:01
2. "Stray Cat" (ストレイキャット) - 3:59
- "WHITE PRAYER" music video

Version 2 (CD only)

1. "WHITE PRAYER" – 4:01
2. "Stray Cat" (ストレイキャット) - 3:59
3. "THE LAST EMPIRE" - 4:03

== Music video ==
The music video starts off with the band walking down some stairs into a hall where they perform the song. Several scenes show the band members in pairs or singularly inside a glass container with the band staring outwards. Possible themes may be connected to clocks or time as shown in the music video. In the end, the band is seen walking up the same flight of stairs from the beginning of the video, and at the very end the words "White Prayer" are shown across the wall in shadow.
