= Gemini (Alice Nine album) =

Studio album by Alice Nine
- Released: February 9, 2011
- Recorded: 2010–2011
- Genre: Alternative rock; progressive rock
- Length: 55:04
- Label: Tokuma Japan Communications
- Producer: Alice Nine

Alice Nine chronology
Vandalize (2009)	Gemini (2011)	9 (2012)

Singles from Gemini
- 1. "Senkou" Released: August 25, 2010; 2. "Stargazer:" Released: November 10, 2010

Gemini (stylized in promotional material as GEMINI) is the fourth studio album by Japanese visual kei rock band Alice Nine. The album was officially released on February 9, 2011.

Gemini was released in two formats: a limited edition with an exclusive DVD and a regular edition with an exclusive bonus track. The DVD included with the limited edition of the album features a music video for "Gemini 0: Eternal" and a making-of documentary for the music video. The album was preceded by two singles: "Senkō", released in August 2010, and "Stargazer:", released in November 2010.

The title of the album refers to a theme of "duality", particularly opposing elements such as light versus shadow and birth versus death. This theme is most prevalent in the trilogy of songs after which the album is named.

== Track listing ==
All lyrics written by Shou. All tracks were produced by Hajime Okano, with the exception of "Senkō", which was produced by Alice Nine.

Standard edition

No.	Title	Writer(s)	Length
1.	"I."	Saga	4:23
2.	"Rumwolf"	Hiroto, Saga	3:00
3.	"Stargazer:"	Saga	4:14
4.	"4U"	Saga	5:52
5.	"Shinkirō (蜃気楼)"	Tora	3:44
6.	"King & Queen"	Tora	3:13
7.	"Entr'acte"	Saga	1:33
8.	"Senkō (閃光)"	Saga	4:18
9.	"Fūrin (風凛)"	Saga	4:17
10.	"Gemini": 0. "Eternal"; 1. "The Void"; 2. "The Luv"	Saga	12:14
11.	"Birth in the Death"	Saga	5:49

Limited edition

No.	Title	Writer(s)	Length
12.	"Overture"	Hiroto, Saga	2:29

Limited edition DVD tracks
No.	Title	Length
1.	"Gemini 0: Eternal Music Clip"
2.	"Music Clip Making"

== Personnel ==
- Shou - vocals
- Hiroto - electric guitar, acoustic guitar
- Tora - electric guitar, acoustic guitar
- Saga - bass guitar, electric guitar, synthesizer, programming
- Nao - drums
- Tucky - engineer
- Kenjiro Harigai - art direction, design
- Hiroki Hayashi - design
- Hitoshi Hiruma - engineer
- Keita Joko - engineer
- Tomoka Konagaya - artwork coordination
- Ai Maehara - artwork management
- Susumu Miyawaki - photography
- Mizuo Miura - engineer
- Koji Morimoto - engineer
- Hajime Okano - arrangement, keyboard, synthesizer, tambourine
- Yuya Saito - engineer
- Yasuaki "V" Shindo - engineer
- Shinpei Yamada - engineer

== Reception ==
Gemini peaked at number three on the Oricon Weekly Albums Chart and stayed on the charts for three weeks. The album is their highest Oricon ranking release to date.
