= Punkitsch =

EP by SuG
- Released: September 3, 2008
- Recorded: 2008
- Genre: Rock
- Length: 16:50 (CD); 21:26 (DVD)
- Label: PS Company

SuG chronology
n0iZ stAr (2008)	Punkitsch (2008)

Punkitsch is the second EP by SuG, released September 3, 2008. It includes 5 tracks and a DVD, which included the music video for "butterfly BoY", and making of footage for "butterfly BoY".

== Track listing ==
Disc one (CD)

1. butterfly BoY - 3:07
2. Rinne Sentimental Gang (輪廻せんちめんたるギャング) - 3:13
3. HYSTERiC HONEY - 4:14
4. The last slim bullet - 3:29
5. Gaki☆sensou~desperado wa totsuzen ni~ (餓鬼☆戦争〜デスペラードは突然に〜) - 2:47

Disc two (DVD)

1. "butterfly BoY" - 4:36
2. "Making of butterfly BoY" - 12:02

== Music video ==
The video opens with Takeru (the lead singer) in what appears to be an old abandoned warehouse or factory using a paper cutter to make counterfeit money. After finishing, he puts the bills away and smiles, and the words, "Life is all good." appear as subtitles on the bottom of the screen. He then reaches over and turns on a stereo, starting the song. The song plays, showing scenes of the band dressed in Oshare Kei costumes playing their instruments and singing apparently outside of the factory at night, surrounded by fog, dead plants, dirt, and litter with paper cut-outs of animals and colored balls suspended in the air around them. Scattered images of a ventilation fan spinning, and close-ups of Takeru on a chair surrounded by subwoofers and singing into a large lollipop are shown as well. At the climax of the song, Takeru throws the fake money into the air and continues to sing as it falls on the band like rain. After the song ends, the video cuts back to the room with the paper cutter, this time with all the band members in it counting the fake money. Their speech replaced with English subtitles, the band exclaims that they will now be able to buy anything and throw handfuls of the counterfeit bills into the air. As they continue to celebrate in silence, the English phrase, "Is there the value that you can't buy for money?" appears in the center of the screen and the video fades to black.
