= Cross Game (song) =

- Type A CD cover

Single by Alice Nine
- Released: December 10, 2008
- Genre: Alternative rock, hard rock
- Label: PS Company, King

Alice Nine singles chronology
"Rainbows" (2008)	"Cross Game" (2008)	"Hana" (2009)

"Cross Game" is the 14th maxi single by Alice Nine. It was released on December 10, 2008, in two versions: the first version includes a DVD with a music video and a random photocard of one of the band members, and the second version features only the CD while including a bonus track. The title track was the second ending theme for the TV Tokyo anime series Yu-Gi-Oh! 5D's.

== Track listing ==
Version 1 (CD and DVD)

1. "Cross Game"
2. "[atmosphere]"
- "Cross Game" music video

Version 2 (CD only)

1. "Cross Game"
2. "[atmosphere]"
3. "Mugen -electric eden-" (夢幻 -electric eden-)
