= Bellzlleb =

Japanese heavy metal band

- Origin: Chiba, Japan
- Genres: Heavy metal, experimental metal, doom metal, extreme metal, black metal
- Years active: 1985–1992
- Labels: Nude, Captain, Free-Will, Crown
- Past members: Rei; Tetsu; Takami; Kimura; Fumi; Mataro; Rick; Yuji; Koizumi

Bellzlleb (stylized as BELLZLLEᗺ) was a Japanese heavy metal band, formed in 1985 by Tetsu and Yuji in Chiba. The band's sound was heavily influenced by elements from black metal, doom metal and hardcore with philosophical influences from Aleister Crowley, the occult, horror, satanism and the dark, heavy sound of Black Sabbath. They toured the Japanese national club circuit extensively during the 1980s and the early 1990s and created various recordings until they disassociated in 1992.

== History ==
Bellzlleb was formed between junior high school mates in 1985, guitarist and composer Tetsu (Genkaku Allergy, Spooky Six Mouse, E.G.O., Love House, Zeus) drums and arrangement by Yuji (Scarecrow, Love House). Tetsu and Yuji played together prior to Bellzlleb in hard rock band Love House. After a series of auditions, Rick (Norihiko Hayashi) the loudest and craziest bass player in Chiba city, was recruited into the band along with Koizumi (Atsuko Koizumi) who fronted local Black Sabbath cover bands in high school.

Her high-tone vocals were influenced by singer Ozzy Osbourne. This completed the original lineup of Bellzlleb in 1985 during high school. Bellzlleb played at local clubs such as Dancing Mother's and participated in local metal festivals and drew fans together in Chiba, which led to participation in the band contest Yamaha East West in 1985. Bellzlleb won through a series of local and regional contests and was nominated in the East West 1985 nationwide junior finals in Tokyo at Nakano Sun Plaza. During an extensive club circuit era in the Kanto region their first real break came in 1986 when they were asked to open for a thrash metal band, Black Rose. Black Rose was the band whose guitarist and lead composer Pata later joined X Japan. Opening for Black Rose at Kagurazaka Explosion several times during the course of a few months led to a live-phono-sheet recording entitled "Satanic Metal".

"Satanic Metal" increased Bellzlleb's core fan base, which led to another compilation recording at Kagurazaka Explosion in 1987 entitled Heavy Metal Force IV. By the Summer of 1987, Bellzlleb had expanded beyond Kanto region in Japan to expand their fan base on a nationwide level with extensive club circuiting in Japan. Koizumi left in 1987 due to direction disagreement and health related reasons to be replaced by vocalist Rei (ex-Hardwave) as the new frontman. Co-founder and drummer Yuji left in 1988 due to musical style disagreement and direction changes. Bellzlleb's first full-length album "Bellzlleb" which was originally scheduled for release in 1998 was delayed for a year. In 1998 drummer Eby ex-Zi:Kill supported Bellzlleb live performances and participated in compilation album recordings immediately after Yuji's departure. Fumi was recruited 1989 and started recording of their first full-length album, Bellzlleb released from Nude Records. Rick left the band soon after this release due to directional disagreement and was replaced by ex-Jurassic Jade bass player, Mataro. With the 1990 line-up, Bellzlleb recorded a second full-length album, Section II ~Aru Gusha no Shougai~ released by Captain Records (owned by Takarajima).

Bellzlleb increased their touring schedule nationwide to support their release, however Mataro and Fumi left to pursue their respective band careers in Japan and overseas. Tetsu and Rei, left without a rhythm section at Bellzlleb in 1991 released an acoustic mini-album, Inori at Nude Records. The final line-up of Bellzlleb in 1992 consisted of bass player Takami Rosenfeld and drummer Kimura. Bellzlleb released their third and last full-length album, Mr.Ree: ~Kairai to Sad~ in 1992. Bellzlleb toured nationwide and participated in print media and television programs to support the new release, but countless member replacements seemed to have damaged the life of Bellzlleb throughout the life of the band as to portray how they were haunted as a group. Bellzlleb disbanded because Tetsu knew they could not have continued to produce a better sound than they currently had. Kuroyume opened for Bellzlleb on their last gig in 1992 at Meguro Rock-May-Kan.

== Members lineups ==
=== Original lineup 1985–1987 ===
- Vocals: Atsuko Koizumi
- Guitar: Tetsuji "Tetsu" Yamada (Genkaku Allergy, Spooky Six Mouse, E.G.O., Love House, Zeus)
- Guitar: Masanori "Nori" Hashimoto (Tokyo Yankees, Lawless Dogs)
- Bass: Norihiko "Rick" Hayashi (Spooky Six Mouse)
- Drums: Yuji Niwano (Scarecrow, Love House)

=== 1987–1988 ===
- Vocals: Yoshiyuki "Rei" Miyamoto (Hard Wave, Samurai Blondies, Spooky Six Mouse)
- Guitar: Tetsu
- Bass: Rick
- Drums: Yuji

=== 1989 ===
- Vocals: Rei
- Guitar: Tetsu
- Bass: Rick
- Drums: (support) Eby (Zi:Kill)

=== 1989–1990 ===
- Vocals: Rei
- Guitar: Tetsu
- Bass: Mataro (ex-Jurassic Jade)
- Drums: Fumi

=== 1991–1992 ===
- Vocals: Rei
- Guitar: Tetsu
- Bass: Takami (ex-Rosenfeld, Salamander)
- Drums: Kimura (Genkaku Allergy)

== Discography ==
- "Satanic Metal" (October 25, 1986, Private PLM-130)
- Bellzlleb (October 1989, Nude Records NUDE-0002)
- Section II ~Aru Gusha no Shougai~ (SECTION II ~ある愚者の生涯~, March 1990, Captain Records GONG-6018 (Independent label owned by Takarajima)
- Inori (祈り, December 25, 1990, Nude Records)
- Mr.Ree ~Kairai to Sad~ (Mr.Ree ~傀儡とSad~, January 10, 1991, Free-Will FWR-10)

=== Video ===
- Dead Don't Die (September 30, 1991, Free-Will)

=== Compilations ===
- East West '85 (1985, V/A, C40A-00433, Canyon Records)
- Heavy Metal Force IV (April 1987, V/A, Explosion Records)
- Emergency Express Metal Warning 2 (1989, V/A, Crown Records)
- Declare a State of Emergency - Emergency Express III (1991, V/A, Toy's Factory Records)
- Hyp No.4 - Special Supplement (1991, V/A, HYP)
