= Alice in Pictures II =

Video by Alice Nine
- Released: 2008
- Genre: Rock

Alice in Pictures II is a compilation DVD from Japanese rock band Alice Nine. It features music videos for nine of the band's hits, and includes the first ever release of the "Gekkou Yoku" music video. It was released in July 2008, alongside Alice in Pictures I.

== Track list ==
1. "Jewels"
2. "White Prayer"
3. "Tsubasa"
4. "Ruri no Ame"
5. "Cosmic World"
6. "Blue Planet"
7. "Mirror Ball"
8. "Eraser -Memoire d'une fleur-"
9. "Gekkou Yoku"
