= Alpha (Alice Nine album) =

Studio album by Alice Nine
- Released: November 28, 2007
- Recorded: Burnish Stone Recording Studio
- Genre: Power pop; alternative rock
- Length: 52:34
- Label: King Records; PS Company
- Producer: Tomomi Ozaki (PS Company); Koji Shimana (King Records)

Alice Nine chronology
| Zekkeishoku (2006) | Alpha (2007) | Vandalize (2009) |

Alpha is the second full-length studio album from visual kei rock band Alice Nine. It was released on the November 28th, 2007. Alpha includes 12 tracks, 4 of which were previously released as singles. Two versions of the album were released on the same day: one regular edition with only the CD, and one special edition with an exclusive DVD that includes two new music videos. The song "Eraser" is also featured on the band's Mirror Ball single, albeit remade with a different arrangement and instrumental background.

== Track listing ==
Disc one (CD)
| No. | Title | Length |
|---|---|---|
| 1. | "Zero" | 4:49 |
| 2. | "Cosmic World" | 5:09 |
| 3. | "Aoi Tori" (蒼い鳥; "Blue Bird") | 3:24 |
| 4. | "Jewels" | 4:47 |
| 5. | "9th Revolver" | 3:03 |
| 6. | "-Dice-" | 3:27 |
| 7. | "Number Six." | 5:38 |
| 8. | "Kousai" (虹彩; "Iris") | 7:37 |
| 9. | "White Prayer" | 4:01 |
| 10. | "Eraser" (イレイザー) | 5:02 |
| 11. | "Blue Planet" (ブループラネット) | 3:19 |
| 12. | "Cradle to [Alpha]" | 2:24 |
| Total length: | | 52:34 |

Disc two (DVD, limited edition only)
| No. | Title | Length |
|---|---|---|
| 1. | "Cosmic World" |
| 2. | "Blue Planet" |

== Videos From "Alpha" ==
- "Cosmic World"
- "Jewels"
- "Number Six."
- "White Prayer
- "Eraser"
- "Blue Planet"
