= Namae wa, Mada Nai =

Single by Alice Nine
- Released: July 5, 2004
- Genre: Punk rock
- Songwriter(s): Alice Nine

Alice Nine singles chronology
| "Namae wa, Mada Nai" | ""Gin no Tsuki Kuroi Hoshi"" |

"Namae wa, Mada Nai" (名前は、未だ無ひ。; I Don't Yet Have a Name) is the first single release by Japanese rock band Alice Nine. It was released on July 5, 2004.

== Track listing ==
1. "Time Machine" (タイムマシン)
2. "Merou ni Shizunde" (メロウに沈んで; Sinking in Mellowness)
3. "Hana Ichi Monme" (華一匁)
