= Zekkeishoku =

- Original Version

Studio album by Alice Nine
- Released: April 26, 2006
- Genre: Alternative rock
- Length: 51:16
- Label: PS Company/King
- Producer: Alice Nine

Alice Nine chronology
Kasou Musou Shi (2005)	Zekkeishoku (2006)	Alpha (2007)

Zekkeishoku (絶景色; Scenery) is the first full-length album by Alice Nine and was released on April 26, 2006. Its limited version comes with a DVD, that contains an additional music video for the song "Velvet".

== Track listing ==
1. Corona (光環) – 5:11
2. Velvet (ヴェルヴェット) – 5:15
3. Fantasy – 5:27
4. 3.2.1.REAL -SE- – 1:09
5. Haru, Sakura no Koro (春、さくらの頃; Spring, the Time of Cherry Blossoms) – 5:01
6. Dead School Screaming – 3:49
7. Kokkai no Kurage -Instrumental- (黒海の海月; Jelly Fish of the Black Sea) – 1:08
8. Jelly Fish – 5:37
9. World End Anthology (ワールドエンドアンソロジー) – 3:50
10. Q. ("Question") – 2:48
11. Kowloon – Nine Heads Rodeo Show- (九龍; Kowloon) – 4:38
12. Armor Ring – 7:23

=== DVD ===
1. Velvet PV
