= Blue Planet (Alice Nine song) =

Single by Alice Nine

from the album Alpha
- Released: October 4, 2006
- Recorded: 2006
- Genre: Pop rock
- Length: 3:19
- Label: Free-Will, PS Company
- Songwriter(s): Alice Nine
- Producer(s): Alice Nine

Alice Nine singles chronology
"Akatsuki/Ikuoku no Chandelier" (2006)	"Blue Planet" (2006)	"Number Six" (2006)

"Blue Planet" (ブループラネット, Burũ Puranetto) is a single by Alice Nine, and their first digital download. It was released simultaneously with Number Six on October 4, 2006.

A year after its digital release, the track was re-recorded. The new recording is featured in the album Alpha, as well as the music video. The music video for Blue Planet was released on November 1, 2007 on Yahoo.jp. During a live talk with Yahoo, people who logged onto Yahoo could talk to Alice Nine during the broadcast. The video was also released through iTunes Japan.

== Track listing ==
No.	Title	Writer(s)	Length
1.	"Blue Planet" (ブループラネット)	Alice Nine	3:19

== Music video ==
The music video features Alice Nine members acting natural in a planetarium-like blue room, a young girl adorned with devil horns who watches over the world, and a tightly-dressed woman with pink headgear in the shape of a bunny. Various scenes include singer Shou playing chess with the bunny-eared woman and the band members sitting together thoughtfully.
