= Genkaku Allergy =

Japanese visual kei rock band

- Also known as: Genkaku
- Origin: Kyoto, Japan
- Genres: Hardcore punk; heavy metal; noise rock; industrial rock
- Years active: 1992–1997, 2006, 2020–present
- Labels: Free-Will; Victor Entertainment
- Members: Sceana; Shu; Seiichi; Hina
- Past members: Kazzy

Genkaku Allergy (Japanese: 幻覚アレルギー, Hepburn: Genkaku Arerugī) was a Japanese visual kei rock band formed in 1992 by ex-Kamaitachi members Sceana and Kazzy. Its sound mixes elements from hardcore punk, heavy metal, noise and industrial music. They signed with Victor Entertainment in 1994. Genkaku Allergy disbanded in 1997, but in 2006 vocalist Sceana regrouped the band for one last show. In 2020, he resurrected the band as simply Genkaku (幻覚).

== Band history ==
In 1992, following the end of Kamaitachi, Sceana and Kazzy started Genkaku Allergy. The same year their first EP, Mouth to Mouth, was released by Free-Will. This first work quickly climbed up the indie charts to the first position. In 1994, they achieved a deal with major label, Victor Entertainment. After their final album, D no Susume, Genkaku Allergy disbanded in early 1997. Nine years later, Sceana revived the group for one last concert on March 12, 2006, with Kazzy only playing support under the alias Kazii Sasuke.

In 2020, Sceana restarted the group as simply Genkaku. Two years later, he was joined by TSP guitarist Shu and former Zi:Kill bassist Seiichi. In 2023, TSP drummer Hina joined in August, and Genkaku released the self-cover mini-album Kill Mother Fucker.

== Members ==
Current members

- Sceana – vocals (ex:Kamaitachi)
- Shu – guitar (TSP)
- Seiichi – bass (ex:Zi:Kill)
- Hina – drums (TSP)

Former members

- Kazzy – guitar (ex:Kamaitachi)

Former support members

- Tetsuji "Tetsu" Yamada – guitar (ex:Bellzlleb)
- Horie – drums 1996
- Kimura – drums 1992–1995 (ex:Bellzlleb)

== Discography ==
- Mouth to Mouth (April 21, 1992)
- Psyche:Delic (March 30, 1994), Oricon Albums Chart Peak Position: No. 25
- Japanese Trash (December 16, 1994) No. 66
- D no Susume (「D」のススメ, February 21, 1996, Produced by Ken, ex:Zi:Kill) No. 56
