= 9 (Alice Nine album) =

Studio album by Alice Nine
- Released: February 22, 2012
- Recorded: 2011–2012
- Genre: Alternative rock; progressive rock
- Length: 55:04
- Label: Tokuma Japan Communications
- Producer: Alice Nine

Alice Nine chronology
| Gemini (2011) | 9 (2012) | Supernova (2014) |

Singles from 9
- 1. "Blue Flame:" Released: August 6, 2011; 2. "Heart of Gold:" Released: September 7, 2011; 3. "Niji no Yuki (虹の雪)" Released: December 21, 2011

9 is the fifth studio album by Japanese visual kei rock band Alice Nine. The album was officially released on February 22, 2012.

9 was released in two formats: a limited edition with an exclusive DVD and a regular edition. The DVD included with the limited edition of the album features a music video for "すべてへ", as well as a multi-angle version of the music video focusing on one of the five members of the band and a making-of documentary for the music video. The album was preceded by three singles: "Blue Flame", released in August 2011, and "Heart of Gold", released in September 2011 and finally Niji no Yuki on 21 December 2011.

After the release, the band embarked on four tours of Japan entitled Alice Nine "Court of '9'" #1-4. So far they have completed the first two of these tours with relative success in all areas of Japan, managing to sell out in many medium-to-large venues nationwide.

== Track listing ==
All lyrics written by Shou. A majority of the tracks were joint-produced by Alice Nine and Hajime Okano, except for Blue Flame and Heart of Gold (Produced by Alice Nine) and Niji no Yuki which was produced by Takamichi Tsugei.

Standard edition

| No. | Title | Writer(s) | Length |
|---|---|---|---|
| 1. | "Heavenly Tale" | Saga | 4:25 |
| 2. | "the Arc" | Saga | 4:42 |
| 3. | "GALLOWS" | Tora | 3:45 |
| 4. | "花霞 (Kasumi)" | Hiroto | 5:02 |
| 5. | "BLUE FLAME" | Saga | 4:40 |
| 6. | "ハロー、ワールド (Hello, World)" | Saga | 4:47 |
| 7. | "虹の雪 (Niji no Yuki)" | Shou | 4:24 |
| 8. | "リニア (Linear)" | Hiroto | 4:24 |
| 9. | "Apocalypse ［It's not the end］" | Tora | 3:45 |
| 10. | "Heart of Gold" | Tora | 3:21 |
| 11. | "すべてへ (Subete e)" | Saga | 5:38 |

Limited edition DVD tracks
| No. | Title | Length |
|---|---|---|
| 1. | "すべてへ Music Clip (+Multi-Angle ver.)" |
| 2. | "Music Clip Making" |

== Personnel ==
- Shou – vocals
- Hiroto – electric guitar, acoustic guitar
- Tora – electric guitar, acoustic guitar
- Saga – bass guitar, electric guitar, backing vocals, synthesizer, programming
- Nao – drums
- Atsushi Koike – Keyboards & Keyboards Arrangement
- Sin – Recording Director
- Hitoshi Hiruma – Mix Engineer
- Yasuyuki Hara – Mix Engineer, Recording Engineer
- Keiji Kondo – Recording Engineer
- Masahiro Tamoto – Recording Engineer
- Keita Joko – Recording Engineer
- Masahiro Abo – Recording Engineer
- Tucky – Mastering Engineer (Mastering Studio) – parasight mastering
- Koji Yoda (ROKUSHIKI) – Art Direction
- Mayumi Hoshino (ROKUSHIKI) – Design
- Susumu Miyawaki (PROGRESS-M) – Photography
- Masato Hishinuma (DEEP-END) – Styling & Costume
- Kaolu Asanuma (DEEP_END) – Hair & Make-up
- Fumie Nozawa – Hair & Make-up
- Kiyoe Minazawa (TOKUMA JAN COMMUNICATIONS) – Artwork Co-ordination
- Tomomi Ozaki (PS-Company Co. Ltd.) – Executive Producer
- Masahiro Shinoki – Executive Producer
- Hirose Shiraishi (TOKUMA JAPAN COMMUNICATIONS) – Executive Producer

== Reception ==
9 peaked at number 12 on the Oricon Weekly Albums Chart and stayed on the charts for three weeks. Successful, but their lowest album ranking since their first in 2006 and considerably lower than the previous album, 2011's Gemini.
