= Certificate for Students Achieving the Proficiency Level of Upper Secondary School Graduates =

Academic qualification in Japan

Certificate for Students Achieving the Proficiency Level of Upper Secondary School Graduates (高等学校卒業程度認定試験 Kōtōgakkō Sotsugyōteidoninteishiken) is an examination, taken by individuals who could not graduate upper secondary school (High school) for some reason. This exam is provided by Lifelong Learning Promotion Division, Lifelong Learning Policy Bureau, Ministry of Education, Culture, Sports, Science and Technology, Japan, started in 2005 as the replacement of the University Entrance Qualification Examination (大検, Daiken) which were held until 2004 in Japan.

The University Entrance Qualification Examination has been accepted for many universities in Japan, such as Japan's most prestigious University of Tokyo because MEXT has been encouraging post-secondary educations to recognise the certificate. The certificate is meant to certify that the bearer has an academic ability equivalent to a graduate of an upper secondary school. The passing rates of this exams are about 30% to 40% every year. For 2014, there are about 37.1% of students who had passed this examination.

== Awardees ==
Individuals who are or will become 16 years old during the academic year (April to the following March) can take this exam. However, those who are awarded the certificate can not enter a university until they become 18 years old since the certificate is with the proviso that no qualifications until he or she becomes 18 years old. There is an educational exception for one who is 17 years old or older, and is recognised by the university, that he or she has an outstanding skill or talent in a certain field of study that the university specified, can enter the university. This exception can be applied for universities only and not for other educational institutions.

== Subjects ==
The taker must take between 8 and 10 subjects to get the certificate.

=== Required ===
- Japanese
- Math
- English

=== Options ===
The takers must choose one subject from each category (with the exception of Civics and Science).

- World History
  - World History A
  - World History B
- Geography and History
  - Japanese History A
  - Japanese History B
  - Geography A
  - Geography B
- Civics (The takers must choose either Contemporary Society or Ethics & Politics and Economy.)
  - Contemporary Society
  - Ethics
  - Politics and Economy
- Science (The takers must choose either Science and Our Daily Life and one other subject with Basic in its name or three subjects with Basic in their name.)
  - Science and Our Daily Life
  - Basic Physics
  - Basic Chemistry
  - Basic Biology
  - Basic Earth Science

== See also ==
- GED
- Education in Japan
