= Bis (Japanese rock band) =

Japanese rock band

- Origin: Tokyo, Japan
- Genres: Alternative rock, pop punk
- Years active: 2004–2008
- Labels: Free-Will (2007–2008); PS Company (2004–2007)
- Past members: Maru; Tsukasa; Shunsuke (Deceased); Seika

Bis ("bis" for "visual", ヴィジュアル) was a Japanese visual kei rock band formed in July 2004 and originally signed to the Free-Will sub-division of PS Company.

== History ==
The band has since switched to the main branch of the label and as of 2007 released a full-length album (Believe in Style), along with several EPs and singles. Their first mini album in 2004 was in the top 10 on the Oricon indies chart, and the single "Extra Baka" hit the number 1 spot on the independent singles chart in 2005. The band's vocalist, Maru, posted on their official blog, on November 18, 2007, that the band would be disbanding, and their last live show would be on January 13, 2008. On March 28, 2010, it was announced that Shunsuke had died.

== Lineup ==
- Maru – vocals (ex-Mei)
- Tsukasa – guitar (ex-Usagi)
- Shunsuke – bass (ex-EllDorado)
- Seika – drums (ex-Jakura)

== Discography ==
Albums and EPs

- Freestyle Rock ~Jinsei wa Joujou Da~ (Freestyle rock ～人生は上々だ～; , October 20, 2004)
- Shu no Genjitsu (朱ノ現実, March 2, 2005)
- Ao no Risou (蒼ノ理想, April 6, 2005)
- Kyokutou Strip (極東ストリップ, August 10, 2005) Oricon Album Ranking Position: 55
- Believe in Style (May 30, 2007)
- Problem Child (December 5, 2007)

Singles

- "Extra Baka" (エクストラ馬鹿, November 23, 2005) Oricon Single Ranking Position: 31
- "Heisei Comaneci" (平成コマネチ, April 5, 2006) Oricon Single Ranking Position: 52
- "Nerichagi Otome" (September 27, 2006) Oricon Single Ranking Position: 83
- "S-S-I" (April 25, 2007)
- "Yasashi Kaze" (May 30, 2007)

DVD

- "Tricky Wagon" (October 24, 2007)
