= Kasou Musou Shi =

EP and compilation album by Alice Nine.
- Released: November 23, 2005
- Length: 35:46
- Labels: King Records; PS Company
- Producer: alice nine.

Alice Nine. chronology
Alice in Wonderland (2005)	Kasou Musou Shi (2005)	Zekkeishoku (2006)

Kasou Musou Shi (華想夢想紙; Flower Thought Dream Thought Paper) is a compilation EP from visual kei rock band alice nine. It was released on November 23, 2005. It includes seven tracks, six of which were previously released as singles. Two versions of the album were released on the same day, one regular edition and one special edition.

== Track listing ==
1. Seija no Parade (聖者のパレード; Parade of the Saints) – 4:15
2. Gin no Tsuki Kuroi Hoshi (銀の月黒い星; Silver Moon Black Star) – 4:38
3. Yami ni chiru sakura (闇ニ散ル桜; Cherry Blossoms Scattered in the Darkness) – 4:12
4. Byakuya ni Kuro Neko(白夜ニ黒猫; Black Cat in the White Night) – 4:52
5. Yuri wa Aoku Saite (百合は蒼く咲いて; Lilies Bloom Palely) – 5:08
6. Kousai Stripe (光彩ストライプ; Stripe of Brilliance) – 4:53
7. Mugen no Hana (無限の花; Infinite Flowers) – 7:51
