= Kra (band) =

Japanese visual kei rock band

- Origin: Japan
- Genres: Alternative rock; indie pop; funk rock; hard rock
- Years active: 2001–present
- Labels: PS Company (2002-); PluS Records (2002)
- Members: Keiyuu; Yura
- Past members: Mai; Taizo; Yasuno
- Website: kra.tokyo

Kra is a Japanese visual kei rock band formed in 2001.

== Musical styles ==
Their music includes a variety of genres from indie pop, alternative, funk, punk, hard rock and even an influence of jazz. Kra is signed to the PS company label and made their major label debut with the single "Heart Balance" on September 21, 2006.

== History ==
The band formed in August 2001, and released their first demo tape, Brise, on May 18, 2002. The following November, they signed a contract with PS Company after releasing their second demo tape, Hard Lolita.

Guitarist Mai left the band due to health problems and a farewell performance was made on December 28, 2010.

Guitarist Taizo and drummer Yasuno left the band after a concert on January 25, 2019, due to artistic differences.

== Members ==
Current Lineup

- Keiyuu - vocals, piano, guitar (2001–present)
- Yuhra - bass (2001–present)

Former Members

- Mai - guitar (2001-2010 - due to poor health)
- Taizo - guitar (2011-2018) (formerly of Zoro)
- Yasuno - drums (2001-2018)

== Discography ==
They have covered four songs from other PS Company bands as '36481?', which is their alter ego band, in an EP called 'Fiction'.

=== Demo tapes ===
- [2002.05.18] Brise
- [2002.11.03] Hard Lolita (ハードロリータ)

=== Singles ===
- [2004.03.10] Kuu (クゥ)
- [2005.03.23] Yaneura no Kanrinin (屋根裏の管理人)
- [2006.09.21] Heart Balance (ハートバランス)
- [2006.12.06] Artman (アートマン)
- [2008.01.23] Yell
- [2008.05.14] Kizuna (絆-キズナ-)Yu-Gi-Oh! 5D's 1st Japanese opening theme
- [2008.10.08] Amaoto wa Chopin no Shirabe (雨音はショパンの調べ)
- [2009.06.10] Love Lab (ラブラボ)
- [2009.10.28] Bird
- [2010.08.10] Dennou Imagination (デンノヲ空想理論)
- [2011.06.01] Fushigi na sekai kara no shotaijo (不思議な世界からの招待状)
- [2011.05.30] Honne(ホンネ)
- [2012.09.23] Kakusei Distortion
- [2013.09.11] Clown's Crown

=== Albums ===
- [2007.03.07] Dhar・ma
- [2008.03.12] Escape (エスケープ)
- [2009.02.04] Life ~ Today is a very good day to Die ~
- [2010.02.24] Twinkle star
- [2010.11.24] Gurico
- [2011.10.26] Naro to Torte
- [2013.02.27] Joker's KINGDOM
- [2015.10.14] Tsugi No Monogatari (次の物語)

=== EPs ===
- [2002.10.30] Boku to no Himitsu (ぼくとの秘密)
- [2003.01.29] Kimi ni Shitsumon! (きみに質問！)
- [2003.05.07] Circus Shounen (サーカス少年)
- [2003.10.29] Brahman (ブラフマン)
- [2003.10.29] Artman (アートマン)
- [2004.03.10] Fiction (as 36481?
- [2005.04.20] Shiki Tabi no Sanposha (四季旅の散歩者)
- [2005.08.17] ACID Maerchen
- [2006.03.08] Krabian Night (ケラビアンナイト)
- [2006.03.08] Hoshizora Ressha no Kiteki wo Kikinagara (星空列車の汽笛を聞きながら)
- [2007.09.26] Creatures
- [2014.04.23] Satahinato (サタヒナト)

=== DVD ===
- [2004.12.22] Meisaku Gekijou (迷作劇場)
- [2007.03.28] Court of Justice
- [2008.07.23] Kra 2008: Oneman Live Yaonbirakidayo zeninshugo!
- [2008.10.08] Kraction
- [2010.07.07] Yaonbirakidayo zeninshugo! Part 2
