= Kagrra, =

Japanese visual kei folk rock band

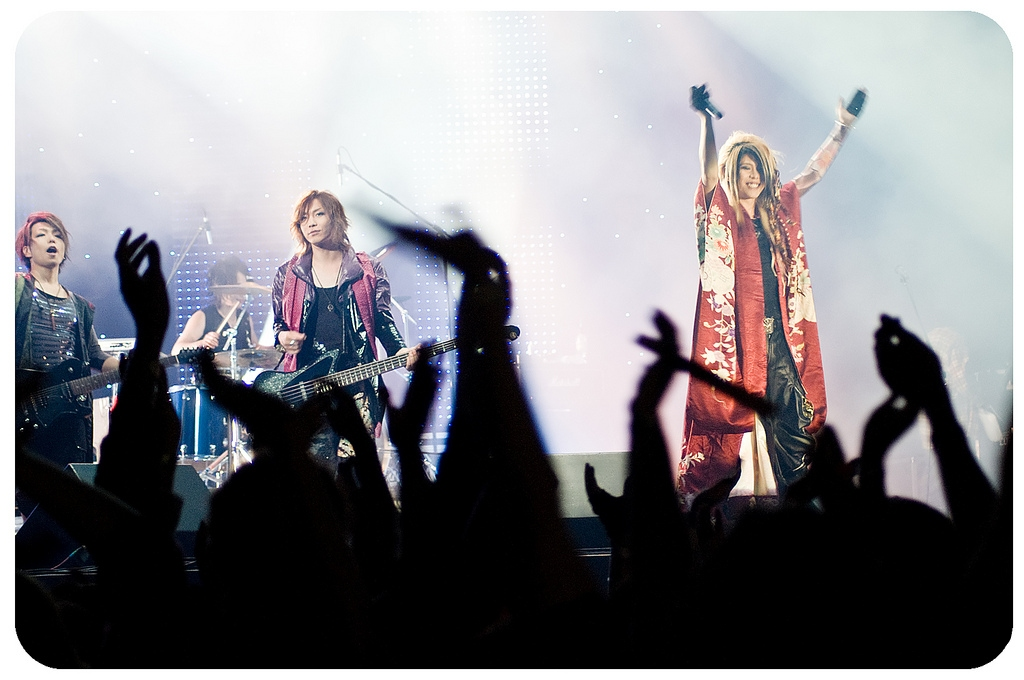

Background information
- Also known as: Crow
- Origin: Tokyo, Japan
- Genres: Folk rock; J-folk
- Years active: 1998–2011
- Labels: PS Company, Columbia, King, CLJ (EU)
- Past members: Isshi; Akiya; Shin; Nao; Izumi

Kagrra, (神樂, Kagura) was a Japanese visual kei folk rock band. They were originally signed to the now defunct Key Party Records under the name "Crow". The group changed its name when they signed to PS Company in 2000.

== History ==
The band's major debut was in 2004 with the single "Urei". Kagrra,'s concept is "Neo Japanesque". Their lyrics were in the style of Heian era poetry, their costumes frequently incorporated traditional Japanese clothing styles, and traditional Japanese instruments and drum rhythms were used in some of their songs. On November 10, 2010, it was announced that Kagrra, would be disbanding after ten years together. As a final request, the members asked that fans refer to it as a "demise" rather than a disbandment. The band released one last CD and held a final tour. The CD, entitled Hyakki Kenran, was released on February 2, 2011. Their final tour began on February 13, 2011 and ended on March 3, 2011 at the Shibuya C.C. Lemon Hall in Tokyo.

On July 25, 2011, it was announced that vocalist Isshi died in his home on July 18, 2011. He was 32 years old.

== Members ==
- Isshi (一志) – vocals, flute
- Akiya (楓弥) – guitar
- Shin (真) – guitar, koto
- Nao (女雅) – bass
- Izumi (白水) – drums

== Discography ==
=== Demo tapes ===
Title	Release date	Label
Hyakuyae (百夜絵)	July 13, 1999	Key Party Records
Kotodama (恋綴魂)	June 21, 2000	PS Company

=== Albums and EPs ===
Title	Release date	Label
Nue (鵺; Chimera)	December 1, 2000	PS Company
Sakura (桜; Cherry Blossom)	March 3, 2001	PS Company
Irodori (彩; Color)	October 3, 2001	PS Company
Kirameki (煌)	May 1, 2002	PS Company
Gozen	December 11, 2002	PS Company
Ouka Ranman (桜花爛漫)	September 24, 2003	PS Company
Miyako (京; Capital)	March 3, 2004	Columbia
San (燦)	July 20, 2005	Columbia
Shizuku (雫; Drop)	February 14, 2007	Columbia
Core	January 9, 2008	King Records / Europe: CLJ Records
Shu (珠; Jewel)	April 1, 2009	King Records / Europe: CLJ Records
Hyakki Kenran (百鬼絢爛)	February 2, 2011	Peace&Smile Music / Europe: CLJ Records
Kagrra Indies Best 2000-2003	June 29, 2011	PS Company

=== Singles ===
Title	Release date	Label
Genwaku no Joukei (幻惑の情景)	April 27, 2001	PS Company
Memai (眩暈)	May 26, 2001	PS Company
Kamiuta (神謌)	June 29, 2001	PS Company
Tsurezure Naru Mama Ni... (徒然なるままに、、、)	July 27, 2001	PS Company
Yume Izuru Chi (夢イズル地)	April 3, 2002	PS Company
Iroha Ni Hoheto (いろはにほへと)	May 5, 2002	PS Company
Kakashi (案山子)	May 5, 2002	PS Company
Sakura Mai Chiru Ano Oka De (桜舞い散るあの丘で)	October 4, 2002	PS Company
Kotodama (恋綴魂)	October 4, 2002	PS Company
Haru Urara (春麗ら)	May 28, 2003	PS Company
Yotogi Banashi (夜伽噺)	July 30, 2003	PS Company
Urei (愁)	January 1, 2004	Columbia
Rin (凛)	July 21, 2004	Columbia
Omou (憶)	October 27, 2004	Columbia
Sarasouju no Komoriuta (沙羅双樹の子護唄)	February 2, 2005	Columbia
Gen'ei no Katachi (幻影の貌)	February 2, 2005	Columbia
Chikai no Tsuki (誓ノ月)	February 1, 2006	Columbia
Utakata (うたかた) *	November 22, 2006	Columbia
Uzu (渦)	September 10, 2008	King Records
Shiki (四季)	October 21, 2009	King Records
Tsuki ni Murakumo Hana ni Ame (月に斑雲 紫陽花に雨)	June 16, 2010	Peace&Smile Music
Shiroi Uso (白ゐ嘘)	August 11, 2010	Peace&Smile Music

* #21 Oricon Weekly Charts, December 4, 2006

=== Videography ===
Title	Release date	Label	Medium
Kagura-fuu Unroku (神楽風雲録)	March 3, 2002	PS Company	VHS
Yume Izuru Chi (夢イズル地)	June 16, 2002	PS Company	VHS
Hisai (秘祭)	November 19, 2003	PS Company	DVD
Kaika Sengen Ouka Ranman (～開花宣言～「桜花爛漫」)	April 7, 2004	PS Company	DVD
Miyako Inishie no Tobira ga Ima (京～古の扉が今、、、～)	July 21, 2004	Columbia	DVD
Sara Natsukashi no Rakuen (沙羅～懐かしの楽園～)	August 3, 2005	Columbia	DVD
Unsanmusyo (雲燦霧消)	November 30, 2005	Columbia	DVD
Kiseki~ni (鬼跡～弐)	September 27, 2006	Columbia	DVD
Shuen - Sakura Maichiru Ano Oka de... (終焉～桜舞い散るあの丘で～)	March 3, 2011	PS Company	DVD
