= Free-Will =

Japanese record label

- Founded: 1986
- Founder: Hiroshi Tomioka
- Status: Active
- Distributor(s): In Japan:Avex Group, Sony Music Entertainment Japan, King Records, Tokuma Japan Communications, Pony Canyon; In Europe:Gan-Shin, CLJ Records, Universal Music Group
- Genre: Rock, punk, metal
- Country of origin: Japan
- Location: Roppongi, Minato, Tokyo
- Official website: f-w-d.co.jp

Free-Will (フリーウィル) is an independent Japanese record label founded in 1986 by Color vocalist Hiroshi "Dynamite Tommy" Tomioka, with branches predominantly in Japan and the United States, as well as previously in Europe. The company also provides band management and continues to co-manage many of its artists after they have signed with a major record label.

Free-Will and Extasy Records are credited by Bounce Magazine as two important labels that helped promote visual kei. Free-Will also produced the 2001 anime adaptation of the long running manga series Grappler Baki.

== Sub-divisions ==
The company operates several sub-divisions, some of them for a single band or purpose only. For example, Firewall Div. solely handles material which is released in collaboration with Sony Music.

=== Under Sony Music ===
- Back Coat – 12012
- Firewall Div. – Dir En Grey, Merry
- Lizard – Kagerou

=== Under King Records ===
- PS Company – Kra
  - Indie PSC – Born
- S'Cube – Baroque, Eile de Mu, Puppet Mammy, Ruvie, Tokyo Michael, Cooky

=== Under Tokuma Japan Communications ===
- PS Company – D=Out, Screw

=== Under Avex Group ===
- ism – Kannivalism

== Bands or solo artists managed directly ==
Past

- Alice Nine
- Amphibian
- BIS
- Bellzlleb
- Billy & The Sluts
- By-Sexual
- Color
- Decameron
- DECAYS
- Dir En Grey
- Genkaku Allergy
- Gilles de Rais
- Kagrra,
- Kamaitachi
- Lovemania
- Miyavi
- Red Tail Cat
- Rentrer en Soi
- Sea Monkey
- Speed-ID
- Sug
- sukekiyo
- The Gazette
- ViViD
- Vogue
- Youka
