= Dir En Grey discography =

Japanese heavy metal band discography

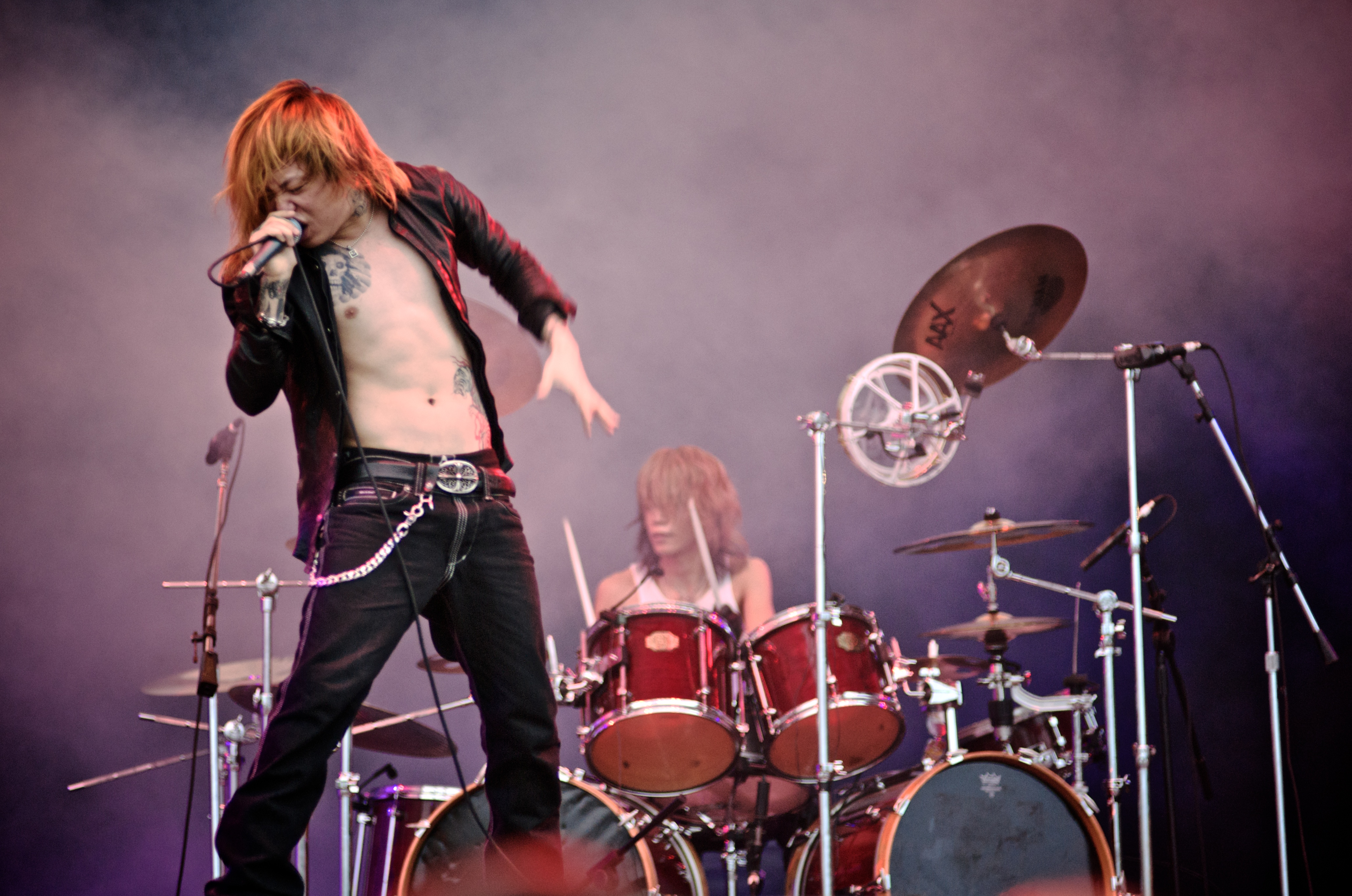
- Dir En Grey vocalist Kyo and drummer Shinya
- Studio albums: 12
- Extended plays: 3
- Compilation albums: 6
- Singles: 34
- Music videos: 7
- Live videos: 33

This is the discography of Dir En Grey, a Japanese heavy metal band. They have recorded twelve original studio albums, three EPs and thirty-one singles in their twenty four years together. Each of the band's releases has charted on Japan's Oricon charts.

Dir En Grey made their earliest releases as an independent band with Free-Will, eventually signing a temporary deal with Warner Music Japan. Dir En Grey's earliest releases were self-produced, however, they worked with a producer, X Japan drummer Yoshiki, for a series of five singles preceding Gauze.

With the release of Macabre, Dir En Grey began to release cooperatively between Firewall Division, a subsidiary of Free-Will, and Sony Music Entertainment Japan. In 2005, Dir En Grey signed to the Europe label, Gan-Shin. The following year, they would release in the United States under Warcon Enterprises and Fontana Distribution, while being managed by Free-Will's American branch. On both foreign labels, the band's initial release was Withering to Death, and followed by The Marrow of a Bone. Their seventh and eighth albums, Uroboros and Dum Spiro Spero, were released in Europe (Gan-Shin) and North America (The End Records). Since then, the band's only releases outside of Japan have been in Europe via Gan-Shin.

Dir En Grey have made only one release on their independent label, Free-Will, since the major label debut; they released their music video compilation, Average Psycho through the independent label due to graphic content, not allowed by Sony.

== Albums ==
Title	Album details	Peak chart positions				
Title	Album details	JPN	FIN	US	US Heat.	US Ind.
Gauze	Label: East West Japan/Free-Will; Released: July 28, 1999; Formats: CD, digital download	5	–	–	–	–
Macabre	Label: Firewall/SMEJ; Released: September 20, 2000; Formats: CD, digital download	4	–	–	–	–
Kisō	Label: Firewall/SMEJ; Released: January 30, 2002; Formats: CD, digital download	3	–	–	–	–
Vulgar	Label: Firewall/SMEJ, Gan-Shin; Released: September 10, 2003; Formats: CD, CD+DVD, digital download	6	–	–	–	–
Withering to Death	Label: Firewall/SMEJ, Gan-Shin, Warcon/Fontana; Released: March 9, 2005; Formats: CD, digital download	8	31	–	42	–
The Marrow of a Bone	Label: Firewall/SMEJ, Gan-Shin, Warcon/Fontana; Released: February 7, 2007; Formats: CD, 2-CD, digital download	7	–	–	8	21
Uroboros	Label: Firewall/SMEJ, Gan-Shin, The End; Released: November 11, 2008; Formats: CD, 2-CD, 2-CD+DVD+2-LP, digital download	4	–	114	1	9
Dum Spiro Spero	Label: Firewall/SMEJ, Okami, The End; Released: August 2, 2011; Formats: CD, 2-CD+DVD+2-LP, digital download	4	40	135	2	22
Arche	Label: Firewall/SMEJ, Okami; Released: December 10, 2014; Formats: CD, 2-CD, 2-BluSpec CD+DVD or Blu-ray, digital download	4	–	–	–	–
The Insulated World	Label: Firewall/SMEJ; Released: September 26, 2018; Formats: CD, 2CD, 2BluSpec CD+DVD or Blu-ray, digital download	6	–	–	–	–
Phalaris	Label: Firewall/SMEJ; Released: June 15, 2022; Formats: CD, 2CD, 2CD+DVD or Blu-ray, digital download	5	–	–	–	–
Mortal Downer	Label: Firewall/SMEJ; Released: April 8, 2026; Formats: CD, CD+DVD or Blu-ray, digital download	4	–	–	–	–
"—" denotes a recording that did not chart or was not released in that territory.

== Extended plays ==
Title	EP details	Peak chart positions
Title	EP details	JPN
Missa	Label: Free-Will; Released: July 25 1997; Formats: CD, digital download	93
Six Ugly	Label: Firewall/SMEJ; Released: July 3, 2002; Formats: CD, digital download	9
The Unraveling	Label: Firewall/SMEJ, Okami; Released: April 3, 2013; Formats: CD, CD+DVD, 2-CD+DVD, digital download	3

== Singles ==
Title	Year	Peak chart positions		Album
Title	Year	JPN	FIN	Album
"Jealous"	1998	38	–	Non-album singles
"-I'll-"	1998	7	–	Non-album singles
"Akuro no Oka"	1999	7	–	Gauze
"Yurameki"	1999	5	–	Gauze
"-Zan-"	1999	6	–	Gauze
"Cage"	1999	8	–	Gauze
"Yokan"	1999	6	–	Gauze
"Myaku"	2000	8	–	Macabre
"[KR] Cube"	2000	6	–	Macabre
"Taiyō no Ao"	2000	7	–	Macabre
"Ain't Afraid to Die"	2001	7	–	Non-album single
"Filth"	2001	6	–	Kisō
"Jessica"	2001	9	–	Kisō
"Embryo"	2001	9	–	Kisō
"Child Prey"	2002	8	–	Vulgar
"Drain Away"	2003	8	–	Vulgar
"Kasumi"	2003	7	–	Vulgar
"The Final"	2004	9	–	Withering to Death
"-Saku-"	2004	6	–	Withering to Death
"Clever Sleazoid"	2005	10	15	The Marrow of a Bone
"Ryōjoku no Ame"	2006	8	–	The Marrow of a Bone
"Agitated Screams of Maggots"	2006	5	–	The Marrow of a Bone
"Dozing Green"	2007	3	–	Uroboros
"Glass Skin"	2008	6	–	Uroboros
"Hageshisa to, Kono Mune no Naka de Karamitsuita Shakunetsu no Yami"	2009	2	–	Dum Spiro Spero
"Lotus"	2011	6	–	Dum Spiro Spero
"Different Sense"	2011	5	–	Dum Spiro Spero
"Rinkaku"	2012	4	–	Arche
"Sustain the Untruth"	2014	6	–	Arche
"Utafumi"	2016	12	–	The Insulated World
"Ningen o Kaburu"	2018	5	–	The Insulated World
"The World of Mercy"	2019	8	–	Non-album single
"Ochita Koto no Aru Sora"	2020	–	–	Phalaris
"Oboro"	2021	5	–	Phalaris
"19990120"	2024	2	–	Non-album single
"The Devil in Me"	2024	6	–	Mortal Downer
"—" denotes a recording that did not chart or was not released in that territory.

== Compilations ==
- Behind the Mask, Volume 2 (November 25, 1997)
- Kai (改 -Kai-), (Remix Album) (August 22, 2001)
- The Best of Taste of Chaos (January 24, 2006)
- The Family Values Tour 2006 CD (December 26, 2006)
- Decade 1998–2002 (December 19, 2007)
- Decade 2003–2007 (December 19, 2007)
- Romantist - The Stalin, Michiro Endo Tribute Album (December 9, 2010)
- Vestige of Scratches (January 2, 2018)

== Music videos ==
- Kaede ~If Trans...~ (「楓」～if trans･･･～, January 15, 1998)
- Mōsō Tōkakugeki (妄想統覚劇, October 7, 1998)
- Gauze -62045- (November 17, 1999)
- Kimon (鬼門, March 20, 2002)
- Average Fury (June 29, 2005)
- Average Psycho (July 27, 2005)
- Average Blasphemy (October 27, 2009)
- Average Sorrow (April 1, 2015)
- Average Psycho 2 (September 2, 2015)
- Average Psycho 3 (March 30, 2022)

== Live videos ==
- Mōsō Kakugaigeki (妄想格外劇, October 7, 1998)
- 1999.12.18 Ōsaka-jō Hall (February 16, 2000)
- Tour 00⏩01 Macabre (July 25, 2001)
- Rettō Gekishin Angya Final 2003 5 Ugly Kingdom (May 21, 2003)
- Blitz 5 Days (March 3, 2004)
- Tour 04 The Code of Vulgar[ism] (November 6, 2004)
- Tour 05 It Withers and Withers (May 8, 2006)
- The Family Values Tour 2006 DVD (December 26, 2006)
- Despair in the Womb (February, 2007)
- In Weal or Woe (February 10, 2008)
- A Knot Of (February 2, 2009)
- Tour 08 The Rose Trims Again (April 28, 2009)
- Tour 09 Feast of V Senses (September, 2009)
- Uroboros -With the Proof in the Name of Living...- At Nippon Budokan (May 26, 2010)
- Tour 2011 Age Quod Agis Vol.1 (Europe & Japan) (June 20, 2012)
- Tour 2011 Age Quod Agis Vol.2 (U.S. & Japan) (July 18, 2012)
- Tour 12-13 In Situ-Tabula Rasa (September 25, 2013)
- Tour13 Ghoul (April 23, 2014)
- Dum Spiro Spero At Nippon Budokan (July 16, 2014)
- Tour14 Psychonnect -Mode Of “Gauze?”- (September 2014)
- Arche At Nippon Budokan (June 2016)
- Tour16-17 From Depression To ________ [Mode Of Vulgar] (March 2017)
- Tour16-17 From Depression To ________ [Mode Of Dum Spiro Spero] (March 2017)
- Tour16-17 From Depression To ________ [Mode Of Kisō] (March 2017)
- Tour16-17 From Depression To ________ [Mode Of Uroboros] (September 2017)
- Tour16-17 From Depression To ________ [Mode Of The Marrow Of A Bone] (September 2017)
- Tour16-17 From Depression To ________ [Mode Of Macabre] (July 2018)
- Tour16-17 From Depression To ________ [Mode Of Withering To Death.] (July 2018)
- Documentary Of Tour16-17 From Depression To ________ (July 2018)
- From Depression To ________ [Mode Of 16-17] (August 7, 2019)
- The Final Days of Studio Coast (September 14, 2022)
- 25th Anniversary Tour22 From Depression To ________ (July 7, 2023)
- Tour22-23 Phalaris (August 21, 2024)

== Album scores ==
- Gauze (October 24, 1999)
- Macabre (February 1, 2001)
- Kisou [鬼葬] (2002)
- Six Ugly (January 31, 2005)
- Vulgar (January 31, 2005)
- Withering to Death (January 15, 2010)
- The Marrow of a Bone (January 15, 2010)
- Uroboros (September 5, 2011)
- Dum Spiro Spero (February 25, 2013)

== Photo books ==
- Dir En Grey Yarouze (Dir en greyやろうぜ, 1999)
- Shikaku [A Dead Angle] (視覚 [A Dead Angle], 2000)
- Dragon Fly (2002)
- [xx] A Pilgrimage Capsizing the Islands 2002 Asia - The Japanese Fxxker Family (2002)
- Ware (我, 2002)
- UV Special: Dir En Grey The Manipulated Life (2005)
- Dir En Grey Yarouze Special (2006)
- Shankara (2008)
- Ouroboros (2010)
- Amon (2011)
- The Unwavering Fact of Tomorrow Tour 2010-2011 (2011)
- Overseas Documentary Greed (2012)
- Minerva -Rinkaku- (2012)
- Minerva -The Unraveling- (2013)
- Dir En Grey Players Book (2016)
- 2019120520220127 (2022)
