= Cage (song) =

Single by Dir En Grey

from the album Gauze
- B-side: "「S」 (Z-Z Mix)"
- Released: May 26, 1999
- Recorded: One on One Recording North (Los Angeles)
- Genre: Pop rock
- Length: 10:54
- Label: East West (AMDM-6291)
- Composer(s): Kaoru
- Lyricist(s): Kyo
- Producer(s): Yoshiki

Dir En Grey singles chronology
"Zan" (1999)	"Cage" (1999)	"Yokan" (1999)

"Cage" is the 4th single by the Japanese heavy metal band Dir En Grey released on May 26, 1999. The song appeared on Japanese radio stations in the late 1990s such as Music Station. With it receiving all around positive ratings from listeners and critics a-like.

The song "「S」" from the band's previous indie debut EP Missa, was remixed by Chris Vrenna. The same person who remixed "Cage" on the Yokan B-Sides.

Mejibray played a cover of "Cage" in the CRUSH!3-90’s V-Rock best hit cover LOVE songs- album, which features newer visual kei artists playing songs of bands that were important to the 90's movement.

== Track listing ==
All lyrics are written by Kyo; Music composed by Dir En Grey.

No.	Title	Music	Length
1.	"Cage"	Kaoru	5:34
2.	"「S」 (Z-Z Mix)"	Kyo	5:20

== Personnel ==
- Dir En Grey
  - Kyo – vocals, lyricist
  - Kaoru – guitar
  - Die – guitar
  - Toshiya – bass guitar
  - Shinya – drums
- Yoshiki – producer
- Chris Vrenna – remixing

== Chart position ==
Chart	Peak position
Oricon daily singles	6
Oricon weekly singles	7
