= Embryo (Dir En Grey song) =

2001 song by Dir En Grey

Single by Dir En Grey

from the album Kisō
- Released: December 19, 2001
- Genre: Alternative rock
- Length: 14:08
- Label: Firewall Div. (SFCD-0011)
- Composer(s): Dir En Grey
- Lyricist(s): Kyo
- Producer(s): Kaoru

Dir En Grey singles chronology
"Jessica" (2001)	"Embryo" (2001)	"Child Prey" (2002)

"Embryo" (stylized as "embryo") is the 12th single by Japanese heavy metal band Dir En Grey, released on December 19, 2001.

The first B-side, "Zomboid Reishiki Mix", is a remixed recording by Shinya and Toshiya of another track off the band's same album, Kisō. The second B-side is "Embryo Uteute Boogie-Woogie Elegy Mix" a remix of the title track done by Die.

== Track listing ==
All lyrics are written by Kyo; Music composed by Dir En Grey.

No.	Title	Music	Length
1.	"Embryo"	Kaoru	5:28
2.	"Zomboid Reishiki Mix" (Zomboid 零式MIX; "Zomboid Zero Mix")	Shinya, Toshiya	4:25
3.	"Embryo Uteute Boogie-Woogie Elegy Mix" (Embryo ウテウテブギウギ 哀歌)	Die	4:02

== Chart position ==
Year	Chart	Position
2001	Oricon	6

== Personnel ==
- Dir En Grey
  - Kyo – vocals, lyricist
  - Kaoru – guitar
  - Die – guitar
  - Toshiya – bass guitar
  - Shinya – drums
- Hiroshi Tomioka – Executive producer
