= The Unraveling (EP) =

EP by Dir En Grey
- Released: April 3, 2013
- Recorded: 2012–2013
- Genres: Avant-garde metal; progressive metal
- Length: 33:37 (disc one); 27:12 (disc two)
- Languages: Japanese, English
- Label: Firewall Div./SMEJ
- Producer: Dir En Grey

Dir En Grey chronology
Dum Spiro Spero (2011)	The Unraveling (2013)	Arche (2014)

Professional ratings
Review scores
Source	Rating
Ultimate Guitar	8/10

The Unraveling (stylized as THE UNRAVELING) is the third EP by Japanese heavy metal band Dir En Grey. It was released on April 3, 2013 as a single-CD Original Version, a deluxe Initial Limited Version digipak with bonus recording footage, and a Limited Order-Only Deluxe Version featuring the deluxe digipak with a bonus CD and extra DVD footage.

The bonus CD includes a remake of "Macabre" off the eponymous 2000 album and "The Final", with the latter and "Unraveling" as unplugged versions. The extra DVD footage also adds "Shot In One Take" versions of "Rinkaku" and "Kiri to Mayu", live performances from their performance on December 25, 2012 and an interview with sound engineer Tue Madsen.

Its packaging features art by artist and sculptor Yasuyuki Nishio. Except the title track, all remaining songs were rearranged and re-recorded from previous versions.

It debuted at #3 on the Oricon weekly chart.

== Track listing ==
All lyrics are written by Kyo; all music is composed by Dir En Grey.

Disc one
No.	Title	Length
1.	"Unraveling"	4:42
2.	"Karma" (業, from Kaede ~If Trans...~)	3:43
3.	"Kasumi" (かすみ; "Haze", from Vulgar)	4:09
4.	"Karasu" (鴉; "Crow", from Kisō)	5:36
5.	"Bottom of the Death Valley" (from Kisō)	6:25
6.	"Unknown.Despair.Lost" (from "Jealous")	4:47
7.	"The Final" (from Withering to Death)	4:15
Total length:		33 min 37 sec

Disc two
No.	Title	Length
1.	"Macabre" (from Macabre)	16:18
2.	"Unraveling (Unplugged Ver.)"	5:04
3.	"The Final (Unplugged Ver.)"	5:50
Total length:		1 hour

Initial Limited Version DVD
No.	Title	Length
1.	"The Unraveling (Scenes From Recording)"

Limited Order-Only Deluxe Version DVD
No.	Title	Length
1.	"Rinkaku (Shot In One Take)" (輪郭 (Shot In One Take))
2.	"Kiri to Mayu (Shot in One Take)" (霧と繭 (Shot In One Take); "Mist and Cocoon (Shot In One Take)")
3.	"Shitataru Mōrō [Live]" (滴る朦朧 [Live], Live take at Tokyo International Forum Hall A on December 25, 2012)
4.	"Jūyoku [Live]" (獣慾 [Live], Live take at Tokyo International Forum Hall A on December 25, 2012)
5.	"Interview on The Unraveling"
6.	"The Unraveling (Scenes From Recording)"

== Touring ==
2013 Tours
- TABULA RASA
- TABULA RASA (Overseas)
- GHOUL -mazy- / GHOUL -instinct-
- GHOUL (Overseas)

TOUR2013 TABULA RASA

- April 5 - TOKYO DOME CITY HALL (Tokyo)
- April 11 - Namba Hatch (Osaka)
- April 12 - Namba Hatch
- April 14 - BAY5 SQUARE (Kochi)
- April 18 - Zepp Nagoya (Aichi)
- April 20 - Kyoto KBS Hall (Kyoto)
- April 21 - Kyoto KBS Hall
- April 27 - Kobe International House (Hyogo)
- April 28 - Kobe International House
- May 15 - Shinkiba STUDIO COAST (Tokyo)
- May 16 - Shinkiba STUDIO COAST

TOUR2013 GHOUL -mazy-

- September 18 - Yokohama BLITZ (Kanagawa) -｢a knot｣only-
- September 19 - Yokohama BLITZ
- October 14 - Zepp Nagoya
- October 18 - Shinkiba STUDIO COAST
- October 19 - Shinkiba STUDIO COAST
- October 22 - Namba Hatch
- October 24 - Namba Hatch

TOUR2013 GHOUL -instinct-

- September 24 - SENDAI Rensa (Miyagi)
- September 26 - NIIGATA LOTS (Niigata)
- September 27 - NIIGATA LOTS
- October 4 - OKAYAMA CRAZYMAMA KINGDOM (Okayama)
- October 5 - OKAYAMA CRAZYMAMA KINGDOM
- October 8 - OITA T.O.P.S Bitts Hall (Oita)
- October 11 - KYOTO KBS HALL (Kyoto)
- October 12 - KYOTO KBS HALL

TOUR2013 GHOUL (U.S. and Canada)

- November 3 - Trees (Dallas, Texas)
- November 4 - Scout Bar (Houston, Texas)
- November 6 - Center Stage (Atlanta, Georgia)
- November 8 - Baltimore Soundstage (Baltimore, Maryland)
- November 9 - The Theatre of Living Arts (Philadelphia, Pennsylvania)
- November 11 - Irving Plaza (New York, New York)
- November 12 - Paradise Rock Club (Boston, Massachusetts)
- November 13 - The Opera House (Toronto, Canada)
- November 16 - House of Blues (Chicago, Illinois)
- November 17 - The Varsity Theater (Minneapolis, Minnesota)
- November 19 - The Bluebird Theatre (Denver, Colorado)
- November 21 - Showbox at the Market (Seattle, Washington)
- November 23 - The Grand Ballroom at the Regency Center (San Francisco, California)
- November 24 - House of Blues Sunset Strip (West Hollywood, California)

TOUR2013 TABULA RASA (Overseas)

- June 11 - LIVE MUSIC HALL (Cologne, Germany)
- June 13 - La Cigale (Paris, France)

After announcing The Unraveling on December 25, the band announced "TOUR2013 TABULA RASA" in promotion of the EP. The band went on to play Ozzfest Japan on May 12 and held a special extension of the tour for Japanese buyers of the limited deluxe version, titled "TABULA RASA -Sanagi no Yume wa Ageha no Hane-" at Shibuya Public Hall. In June, Dir En Grey performed at both Download Festival and Nova Rock.

Dir En Grey announced another split tour series in July, titled "GHOUL." The tour will first extend through Japan before extending to the United States and Canada in November.
