= Phalaris (disambiguation) =

Phalaris was the tyrant of Akragas in Sicily (570–554 BC).

Phalaris may also refer to:

- Phalaris (album) by Dir En Grey
- Phalaris (horse), a Thoroughbred racehorse
- Phalaris (plant)

== See also ==
- Epistles of Phalaris
