= Yokan (song) =

Single by Dir En Grey

from the album Gauze
- B-side: "Cage (▷∣◁ Mix)"
- Released: July 14, 1999
- Recorded: One on One Recording North (Los Angeles)
- Genre: Progressive rock, pop rock
- Length: 10:02
- Label: East West (AMDM-6300)
- Composer: Die
- Lyricist: Kyo
- Producer: YOSHIKI

Dir En Grey singles chronology
"Cage" (1999)	"Yokan" (1999)	"Myaku" (2000)

"Yokan" (予感, "Premonition") is the 5th single by Japanese heavy metal band Dir En Grey released on July 14, 1999. It was used as the ending theme for the Yomiuri TV and Nippon TV drama, "Joi (女医) Nothing lasts forever / Female doctor". The song attracted mainstream attention by appearing on Japanese Music Stations, notably Music Station, Popjapan.tv, and Count Down TV.

== Track listing ==
All lyrics are written by Kyo; Music composed by Dir En Grey.

No.	Title	Music	Length
1.	"Yokan" (予感; "Premonition")	Die	4:39
2.	"Cage (▷∣◁ Mix)" (remixed by Chris Vrenna)	Kaoru	5:23

== Personnel ==
- Dir En Grey
  - Kyo – vocals, lyricist
  - Kaoru – guitar
  - Die – guitar
  - Toshiya – bass guitar
  - Shinya – drums
- Yoshiki – producer
- Toru Yamazaki – co-producer
- Chris Vrenna – remixing

== Charts ==
Chart performance for Yokan
Chart (1999)	Peak position
Japanese Singles (Oricon)	6
