= Withering to Death =

Studio album by Dir En Grey
- Released: 9 March 2005
- Recorded: Studio Inning, Studio Fine, On Air Azabu, Studio Greenbird, Sony Music Studios
- Genres: Gothic metal; alternative metal; industrial metal
- Length: 51:14
- Languages: Japanese, English
- Labels: Free-Will/Sony Music Entertainment Japan (JP); Gan-Shin (EU); Warcon (US)
- Producers: Dir En Grey, Yoshinori Abe

Dir En Grey chronology
Vulgar (2003)	Withering to Death (2005)	The Marrow of a Bone (2007)

Alternative cover

Singles from Withering to Death
- 1. "The Final" Released: March 17, 2004; 2. "Saku" Released: July 14, 2004

Professional ratings
Review scores
Source	Rating
AllMusic	3/5 stars
IGN	(8.1/10)
metal.de	(9/10)
Ultimate Guitar	(9.2/10)

Withering to Death (stylized as Withering to death.) is the fifth studio album by Japanese heavy metal band Dir En Grey. Initially published in Japan on March 9, 2005, it was the band's first album to be officially released in Europe, North America and South Korea. In June 2006, Withering to Death reached number 42 on Billboard's "Top Heatseekers" chart. Amazon.com included Withering to Death in its listing of "Top 10 Hard Rock & Metal albums of 2006". In September 2007, Rolling Stone Japan rated it number 34 on its list of the "100 Greatest Japanese Rock Albums of All Time".

In Japan, a first press limited edition with a tannish cover in digi-pack and slipcase form with a red booklet was released, while the standard version has a black cover and a purple booklet. The American and European releases received the black cover and contained an additional DVD with the video of either -Saku- (United States/United Kingdom), "Dead Tree" (Germany), "Kodō" (France) or "The Final" (South Korea); along with live compilations of "Merciless Cult" and "Machiavellism", and selected footage from Tour04 The Code of Vulgar[ism]. A live version of the song "Merciless Cult" is on the Family Values Tour 2006 CD compilation.

== Track listing ==
All lyrics are written by Kyo; all music is composed by Dir En Grey.

No.	Title	Length
1.	"Merciless Cult"	2:55
2.	"C"	3:30
3.	"Saku" (朔-saku-; "New Moon")	2:57
4.	"Kodoku ni Shisu, Yue ni Kodoku." (孤独に死す、故に孤独。; "I Die In Loneliness, Therefore I Am Lonely.")	3:25
5.	"Itoshisa wa Fuhai ni Tsuki" (愛しさは腐敗につき; "With Decay Comes Loveliness")	4:15
6.	"Jesus Christ R'n R"	4:00
7.	"Garbage"	2:49
8.	"Machiavellism"	3:16
9.	"Dead Tree"	4:50
10.	"The Final"	4:13
11.	"Beautiful Dirt"	2:33
12.	"Spilled Milk"	3:44
13.	"Higeki wa Mabuta o Oroshita Yasashiki Utsu" (悲劇は目蓋を下ろした優しき鬱; "Tragedy Is the Sweet Melancholy That Lowered My Eyelids")	5:08
14.	"Kodō" (鼓動; "Heartbeat")	3:39
Total length:		51:14

== Personnel ==
- Yoshinori Abe – co-producer, programming
- Tatsuya Sakamoto – recording, mixing, mastering
- Dynamite Tommy – executive producer
- Koji Yoda – art direction

== Notes ==
- "The Final" was re-recorded and released on their 2013 EP The Unraveling.
- "Beautiful Dirt" was re-recorded and released on their 2018 best-of album Vestige of Scratches.

== Charts ==
Chart performance for Withering to Death
Chart (2005)	Peak position
Japanese Albums (Oricon)	8
Finnish Albums (Suomen virallinen lista)	31
