= Saku (song) =

Single by Dir En Grey

from the album Withering to Death
- Released: July 14, 2004
- Genre: Alternative metal; gothic metal; mathcore; hardcore punk
- Length: 13:56
- Label: Firewall Div. (SFCD-0030)
- Composer(s): Dir En Grey
- Lyricist(s): Kyo
- Producer(s): Kaoru

Dir En Grey singles chronology
"The Final" (2004)	"Saku" (2004)	"Clever Sleazoid" (2005)

"Saku" (朔-saku-, "New Moon") is the 19th single off the Withering to Death album by Dir En Grey released on July 14, 2004. It was nominated for best Music Video Award on MTV's Headbangers Ball in 2006, making it the first ever J-rock song to be nominated for the Award. Although the cover and inlay give the single title as "朔" without annotation, it's considered to be "朔-saku-". Similarly, the song title is written as "朔 saku" in the booklet.

== Track listing ==
All lyrics are written by Kyo; Music composed by Dir En Grey.

No.	Title	Music	Length
1.	"Machiavellism"	Toshiya	3:16
2.	"Saku" (朔-saku-; "New Moon")	Kaoru	2:57
3.	"G.D.S" (G.D.S ends at 3:14 and segues into a live version of "Shokubeni")		7:46

== Personnel ==
- Dir En Grey
  - Kyo – vocals, lyricist
  - Kaoru – guitar
  - Die – guitar
  - Toshiya – bass guitar
  - Shinya – drums
- Hiroshi Tomioka – Executive producer
