= Rinkaku (song) =

Single by Dir En Grey

from the album Arche
- B-side: "Kiri to Mayu"
- Released: December 19, 2012
- Genre: Progressive metal
- Length: 5:43
- Label: Firewall Div.
- Composer(s): Dir En Grey
- Lyricist(s): Kyo
- Producer(s): Dir En Grey

Dir En Grey singles chronology
"Different Sense" (2011)	"Rinkaku" (2012)	"Sustain the Untruth" (2014)

"Rinkaku" (輪郭, "Contours") is the 28th single by Japanese heavy metal band Dir En Grey, released on December 19, 2012.

== Album ==
The release of Rinkaku introduced a new version of Dir En Grey releases. In addition to the regular (通常盤 (Tsūjō-ban)) and first press limited (初回生産限定盤 (Shokai Seisan Gentei-ban)) versions, it was also released as a made-to-order limited version (完全受注生産限定盤 (Kanzen Juchū Seisan Gentei-ban)). This version comes with unique packaging and additional contents, in this case a number of live-recorded tracks from one of the band's 2011 shows. Their next two releases, The Unraveling and Sustain the Untruth, also came in these three versions.

However, with the release of Dir En Grey's next studio album Arche in 2014, a Blu-ray variant became available in addition to the DVD variant of the made-to-order limited version. Subsequently, this version was replaced by the limited production version (完全生産限定盤 (Kanzen Seisan Gentei-ban)), a designation which had been used in the past for the Decade best-of album, as well as the LP-version of Uroboros and Dum Spiro Spero. Since Arche, all of the band's albums and singles have been released as a regular version with just the main disc, a first press limited version with a bonus CD or DVD, and a limited production version with a bonus CD, DVD and/or Blu-ray.

== Cover art ==
The original cover art is created by vocalist Kyo, which was shown at various venues in Japan after release of the single.

== Reception ==
Its highest ranking reached fourth place on the weekly Oricon chart.

== Tracks ==
All lyrics are written by Kyo

No.	Title	Music	Length
1.	"Rinkaku" (輪郭; "Contours")		5:43
2.	"Kiri to Mayu" (霧と繭; "Fog and Cocoon")	Kaoru	4:13
3.	"Rinkaku Eternal Slumber Mix (Remixed by Akira Yamaoka)" (輪郭 Eternal Slumber Mix (Remixed by Akira Yamaoka); "Contours Eternal Slumber Mix (Remixed by Akira Yamaoka)")		5:37

=== First press limited version DVD ===
No.	Title	Music	Length
1.	"Rinkaku" (Scenes from Recording)	Dir En Grey

=== Made-to-order limited version DVD ===
No.	Title	Music	Length
1.	"Amon"	Dir En Grey
2.	"Lotus"	Dir En Grey
3.	"Obscure"	Dir En Grey
4.	"Ruten no Tō" (流転の塔; "Tower of Vicissitudes")	Dir En Grey
5.	"Akatsuki" (暁; "Dawn")	Dir En Grey
6.	"Hageshisa to, Kono Mune no Naka de Karamitsuita Shakunetsu no Yami" (激しさと、この胸の中で絡み付いた灼熱の闇; "The Violence and the Darkness of the Burning Heat Entwines In My Heart")	Dir En Grey
7.	"The Blossoming Beelzebub"	Dir En Grey
8.	"Mazohyst of Decadence"	Dir En Grey
9.	"Tsumi to Batsu" (蜜と唾; "Crime and Punishment")	Dir En Grey
10.	"'Yokusō ni Dreambox' Aruiwa Seijuku no Rinen to Tsumetai Ame" (「欲巣にDREAMBOX」あるいは成熟の理念と冷たい雨; "'Dreambox in a Covetous Nest', or the Idea of Maturity and Cold Rain")	Dir En Grey
11.	"Different Sense"	Dir En Grey
12.	"Decayed Crow"	Dir En Grey
13.	"Rinkaku" (Scenes from Recording)	Dir En Grey

- Kiri to Mayu (霧と繭) is a re-recorded version from their debut EP Missa.
- All live performances featured on the deluxe DVD are from the Tour 2011 Age Quod Agis concert "Ratio ducat, non fortuna" at Tokyo Dome City Hall on 2011.11.11.
