= Kisō =

Studio album by Dir En Grey
- Released: January 30, 2002
- Recorded: 2001
- Genre: Experimental rock; industrial rock; nu metal; alternative metal
- Length: 69:57
- Language: Japanese, English
- Label: Firewall Div./SMEJ
- Producer: Dir En Grey

Dir En Grey chronology
Macabre (2000)	Kisō (2002)	Vulgar (2003)

Singles from Kisō
- 1. "Filth" Released: September 12, 2001; 2. "Jessica" Released: November 14, 2001; 3. "Embryo" Released: December 19, 2001

Kisō (鬼葬, Demonic Burial) is the third studio album by Japanese heavy metal band Dir En Grey. The album was released on January 30, 2002. It has helped them gain popularity across Asia. The first press edition came with an extra booklet of lyrics and the cover booklet came in color, as opposed to the normal release. Unlike their previous two albums, Kisō did not feature extra poems and images per song in the liner notes; rather, the standard booklet came with the band's own English translation of the lyrics, while the extra booklet in the first pressing contained the original Japanese lyrics.

== Track listing ==
All lyrics are written by Kyo

No.	Title	Music	Length
1.	"Kigan" (鬼眼-kigan-; "Demon Eyes")	Dir En Grey	4:04
2.	"Zomboid"	Kaoru	4:22
3.	"Twentyfour Cylinders" (24個シリンダー)	Die	6:07
4.	"Filth"	Dir En Grey	4:55
5.	"Bottom of the Death Valley"	Toshiya	5:50
6.	"Embryo"	Kaoru	5:36
7.	"Shinsō" (「深葬」; "Deep Burial")	Dir En Grey	2:05
8.	"Gyakujō Tannō Keloid Milk" (逆上堪能ケロイドミルク; "Raging Pleasures of Keloid Milk")	Kaoru	4:42
9.	"The Domestic Fucker Family"	Kyo	3:02
10.	"Undecided"	Die	4:53
11.	"Mushi" (蟲-mushi-; "Insect")	Kaoru	6:24
12.	"Shinsō" (「芯葬」; "Core Burial")	Dir En Grey	0:57
13.	"Jessica"	Kaoru	4:11
14.	"Karasu" (鴉-karasu-; "Crow")	Kaoru	5:26
15.	"Pink Killer" (ピンクキラー)	Dir En Grey	3:48
16.	"Shinsō" (「神葬」; "God Burial")	Dir En Grey	3:03
Total length:			69:57

== Notes ==
- A re-recording of "Undecided" was featured on their 2008 single "Glass Skin".
- Re-recordings of "Bottom of the death valley" and "Karasu" were featured on their 2013 EP The Unraveling.
- A re-recording of "Kigan" was featured on the limited editions for their 2018 album The Insulated World.
- A re-recording of "The Domestic Fucker Family" appears as a b-side on their 2021 single "Oboro" under the title "T.D.F.F.".

== Chart positions ==
=== Album ===
Chart performance for Kisō
Chart (2002)	Peak position
Japanese Albums (Oricon)	3

=== Singles ===
Year	Single	Chart	Position
2001	"Filth"	Oricon	4
2001	"Jessica"	Oricon	9
2001	"Embryo"	Oricon	6
