= Mortal Downer =

Studio album by Dir En Grey
- Released: April 8, 2026
- Genre: Progressive metal
- Length: 56:01
- Label: Firewall Div./SMEJ

Dir En Grey chronology
Phalaris (2022)	Mortal Downer (2026)

Singles from Mortal Downer
- 1. "The Devil in Me" Released: April 24, 2024

Professional ratings
Review scores
Source	Rating
Sputnikmusic	3/5

Mortal Downer (stylized in all caps) is the twelfth studio album by Japanese heavy metal band Dir En Grey, released on April 8, 2026, via Firewall Div./SMEJ.

== Background ==
Mortal Downer is the band's first album in four years since Phalaris. The song "The Devil in Me" was first released as a single on April 24, 2024.

== Track listing ==
All lyrics are written by Kyo; all music is composed by Dir En Grey.

No.	Title	Length
1.	"Isolation"	2:02
2.	"Kaijin ni Kisu" (灰燼に帰す)	4:48
3.	"EN'EN" (蜿蜒)	3:15
4.	"Discard"	4:55
5.	"Bloodline"	3:47
6.	"There's Nothing Else"	2:53
7.	"Hizumi to Ame" (歪と雨)	3:04
8.	"The Devil in Me"	4:23
9.	"Mobs"	6:13
10.	"Void"	6:02
11.	"Demand"	3:19
12.	"Kusabi" (楔)	3:34
13.	"Mōmoku ga Yue ni" (盲目が故に)	3:54
14.	"No End"	3:44
Total length:		56:01

== Charts ==
Chart performance for Mortal Downer
Chart (2026)	Peak position
Japanese Albums (Oricon)	4
Japanese Combined Albums (Oricon)	6
Japanese Hot Albums (Billboard Japan)	18
Japanese Rock Albums (Oricon)	2
