= Phalaris (album) =

Studio album by Dir En Grey
- Released: June 15, 2022
- Genres: Avant-garde metal; progressive metal; alternative metal
- Length: 53:45
- Languages: Japanese; English
- Labels: Firewall Div.; SMEJ
- Producer: Dir En Grey

Dir En Grey chronology
The Insulated World (2018)	Phalaris (2022)	Mortal Downer (2026)

Singles from Phalaris
- 1. "Ochita Koto no Aru Sora" Released: August 3, 2020; 2. "Oboro" Released: April 28, 2021

Professional ratings
Review scores
Source	Rating
Sputnikmusic	3.5/5

Phalaris (stylized as PHALARIS) is the eleventh studio album by Japanese heavy metal band Dir En Grey, released on June 15, 2022, via Firewall Div./SMEJ.

== Background ==
Phalaris is the first album in 4 years since The Insulated World, and marks the 25th anniversary of the band's formation. Re-recorded versions of two earlier singles "Mazohyst of Decadence" (from Gauze) and "Ain't Afraid to Die" are included exclusively for the limited edition bonus CD of this release.

The title and artwork for Phalaris is inspired by the ancient tyrant Phalaris and the torture device he invented, the Brazen bull, "in which victims were roasted alive. An internal mechanism was said to distort the screams of the victims into the cries of cattle."

A music video for "The Perfume of Sins" was released on June 14, 2022, "just two hours before midnight of the album's official release on June 15."

A Blu-ray/DVD that has included live recordings taken from performances in Shinkiba Studio Coast in Kōtō, Tokyo, Japan on January 26 and 27, 2022 (additional show), will be released in support of Phalaris, titled The Final Days of Studio Coast. A series of online live events to celebrate the release of the album has been scheduled for July 1, 2, 3, and 18, 2022.

== Critical reception ==
The album received positive reviews from JRock News and rockin'on.com.

== Track listing ==
All lyrics are written by Kyo; all music is composed by Dir En Grey.

No.	Title	Length
1.	"Schadenfreude"	9:58
2.	"Oboro" (朧; "Haziness")	3:59
3.	"The Perfume of Sins"	4:18
4.	"13"	3:42
5.	"Utsutsu, Bouga o Kurau" (現、忘我を喰らう; "Consciousness, Feeding on Ecstasy")	3:30
6.	"Ochita Koto no Aru Sora" (落ちた事のある空; "The Fallen Sky")	3:19
7.	"Mouai ni Shosu" (盲愛に処す; "Condemned to Blind Love")	2:51
8.	"Hibiki" (響; "Echo")	3:58
9.	"Eddie"	2:52
10.	"Otogi" (御伽; "Night Maiden")	6:03
11.	"Kamui" (カムイ; "Kamuy)	9:11
Total length:		53:45

Limited edition bonus disc
No.	Title	Length
1.	"Mazohyst of Decadence"	5:55
2.	"Ain't Afraid to Die"	6:58
Total length:		12:53

== Personnel ==
Dir En Grey

- Kyo (京) – lead vocals
- Kaoru (薫) – guitars, programming
- Die – guitars
- Toshiya – bass
- Shinya – drums

Additional musicians

- Yumi Shimazu – cello (track 1-2)
- Jumpei – violin (tracks 1-2 and 2-2)
- Takumi – programming, piano (track 2-2)

Production

- Dynamite Tommy – executive producer
- Keisuke Kamata – recording engineer
- Koji Maruyama – recording engineer
- Carl Brown – mixing engineer (tracks 1, 3, 4, 6, and 9)
- David Bottrill – mixing engineer (tracks 5, 7, 8, 10, and 11)
- Neal Avron – mixing engineer (track 2)
- Tue Madsen – mixing engineer (bonus tracks)
- Brian Gardner – mastering engineer

== Charts ==
Chart performance for Phalaris
Chart (2022)	Peak position
Japanese Albums (Oricon)	5
