= The Marrow of a Bone =

Studio album by Dir En Grey
- Released: February 7, 2007
- Recorded: December 2005 – January 2007, various locations
- Genres: Alternative metal; metalcore; nu metal
- Length: 63:25: 50:05 (disc one); 13:20 (disc two)
- Languages: Japanese, English
- Label: Firewall Div./SMEJ
- Producer: Dir En Grey

Dir En Grey chronology
Withering to Death (2005)	The Marrow of a Bone (2007)	Uroboros (2008)

Singles from The Marrow of a Bone
- 1. "Clever Sleazoid" Released: October 21, 2005; 2. "Ryōjoku no Ame" Released: July 26, 2006; 3. "Agitated Screams of Maggots" Released: November 15, 2006

The Marrow of a Bone (stylized as THE MARROW OF A BONE) is the sixth studio album by Japanese heavy metal band Dir En Grey and the first to use an all caps capitalization. It was released on February 7, 2007, in Japan, and in the United States (20 February), Germany (2 March), France (6 March), and the United Kingdom (7 May) in the following months. In total, the album was released in eleven countries. The band was touring North America at the time of the album's release in both Japan and the United States. In March 2007, The Marrow of a Bone reached number 21 on Billboard's "Top Independent Albums" chart.

The album was released in Japan with two editions. The regular edition is a single disc packaged in a traditional jewel case, and a limited edition was released with two discs, one being the main album, and the second an "unplugged" album. The European and American releases were all single editions.

The main disc with the thirteen featured tracks were included. The initial pressing of the album's American edition was affected by a misprint that rendered the album cover unreadable. Warcon Records announced that corrected booklets would be printed. Later pressings featured a correctly printed booklet with a fully visible logo. The cover image is taken from the Dmitry Baltermants photograph "Grief".

A promotional site, in both Japanese and English, was launched prior to the album's release, containing video clips and samples of several songs, information about the album, hosted on the band's official web page. A second promotional site was launched shortly after the release, only accessible with a password included in the Japanese release. Both sites posted information about "premium live" shows, available to those who purchased the album and registered with their product barcode. Footage from the first show was featured on the fan club DVD, In Weal or Woe.

== Production ==
The Marrow of a Bone is, like most other Dir En Grey albums, self-produced. Work began on the album as early as 2005, while the majority of songs were written while touring throughout 2006 between shows in Japan, Europe, and America during the Family Values Tour. The band members noted that touring in the United States on a major festival tour influenced and inspired them in the production process, and several songs, including "Lie Buried with a Vengeance", "Agitated Screams of Maggots", and "The Pledge". Guitarist Kaoru has said about the production process, "...some of it went really well, but some of it went really badly." The entirety of the album's final recording was completed following their 2006 tour in December, with only the month of January to finalize production to meet the February release date. Even though the formal process was rapid, it has been described as their cleanest production and heaviest album to date. The production on the supporting singles and the album showed a noted difference, with two of the singles, "Ryōjoku no Ame" and "Clever Sleazoid", being rerecorded entirely for the album, as Dir En Grey hired a new sound engineer. "Ryōjoku no Ame" received a strong change instrumentally, as well as removing the falsetto vocals.

As with every Dir En Grey album following Vulgar (2003), the lyrics are solely composed by Kyo, and all music is credited to Dir En Grey wholly, while the online liner notes give some insight into individual writing of songs, such as drummer, Shinya's writing of "Namamekashiki Ansoku, Tamerai ni Hohoemi".

== Style ==
The entire album is a progression for Dir En Grey into heavier sounds, felt in the previous album, Withering to Death. Individually, the album's songs vary from soft and slow-tempoed, to chunky and aggressive, however the sound on the album always remains dark and emotional.

The album opens with a moody, slow-tempoed power ballad, "Conceived Sorrow", but the contrast is immediate with the second track, "Lie Buried with a Vengeance" displaying "thrashy drumming, callous riffing, and barked vocals". The album continues at a heavier, faster pace with "The Fatal Believer", "Agitated Screams of Maggots", and "Grief". "Agitated Screams of Maggots" is the pinnacle of the album's "straightforward bashing metal". The album steps down in heaviness as "Ryōjoku no Ame" is a "near-symphonic progressive metal tune." Following is "Disabled Complexes", a song that "contains a lot of funk elements" but it quickly goes "into a different dimension in the middle of the song." Showing a completely different sound, "Namamekashiki Ansoku, Tamerai ni Hohoemi" is a deviation from the heavier, loud sound enduring from the second track, and seen as the softest of the feature tracks. The guitar work has a "Spanish-like", melodramatic sound, with a very emotional expression showing "the band's maturity as songwriters,"

The album's final progression to its heavier sounds begins with "The Pledge", which for Kyo, uses his full vocal range. "Repetition of Hatred" is another heavy track to the album, which gives a strong example of the backing vocal aspect, performed by Kaoru, Toshiya and Die, the latter who commented "It's tough sometimes when you have to sing and play your guitar at the same time. Kyo [the lyricist] doesn't think about how difficult it can be."

== Music videos ==
The first music video released was for "Clever Sleazoid" in 2005 with the single version of the song, however the new recording is featured in the live-footage music video found on Despair in the Womb. After a year of touring, the next single, "Ryōjoku no Ame" was released, also featuring a music video. The third single from the album, "Agitated Screams of Maggots", is another song with two music videos. The first music video for the song was an animated video created by Keita Kurosaka, which was shown at the 2007 International Film Festival Rotterdam. The original video aired only as a censored clip on Japanese television, due to its "sick and twisted" nature. A second music video for the song appears on Despair in the Womb, compiled of live footage of their 2006 touring.

"Grief" is the only track on the album to be turned into a music video without being released as a single. The video was released just prior to the album as a promotional clip.

== Touring ==
Winter–summer touring
- Inward Scream
- The Marrow of a Bone
- Deftones Summer Tour

Tour 07 Inward Scream

- February 1 – Revolution (Ft. Lauderdale, FL)
- February 2 – House of Blues (Orlando, FL)
- February 3 – Roxy Theatre (Atlanta, GA)
- February 5 – Ram's Head Live (Boston, MA)
- February 6 – Theatre of the Living Arts (Philadelphia, PA)
- February 7 – Avalon Ballroom (Boston, MA)
- February 9 – Guvernmant (Toronto, ON, Canada)
- February 10 – Nokia Theatre Times Square (New York City, NY)
- February 12 – St. Andrews Hall (Detroit, MI)
- February 13 – House of Blues (Chicago, IL)
- February 14 – Fine Line Music Club (Minneapolis, MN)
- February 16 – Gothic Theatre (Denver, CO)
- February 18 – Meridian (Houston, TX)
- February 19 – Palladium (Dallas, TX)
- February 21 – Marquee Theatre (Tempe, AZ)
- February 23 – The Wiltern Theatre (Los Angeles, CA)
- February 24 – Avalon (Los Angeles, CA)
- February 25 – The Fillmore (San Francisco, CA)

Tour 07 The Marrow of a Bone

- March 10 – Makuhari Messe (Tokyo)
- March 12 – Club Citta Kawasaki (Kawasaki)
- March 13 – Club Citta Kawasaki (Kawasaki)
- March 17 – Aichi-ken Kinroukaikan (Aichi)
- March 18 – Aichi-ken Kinroukaikan (Aichi)
- March 20 – Milparque Fukuoka (Fukuoka)
- March 22 – Bay 5 Square (Kochi)
- March 24 – ATC Hall (Osaka)
- March 29 – NHK Hall (Tokyo)
- March 30 – NHK Hall (Tokyo)
- April 6 – Kanazawa Bunka Hall (Kanazawa)
- April 8 – Nagano-ken Matsumota Bunka Kaikan (Nagano)
- April 13 – Zepp Sendai (Sendai)
- April 15 – Sapporo Factory Hall (Sapporo)
- April 21 – Pacifico Yokohama (Yokohama)
- April 23 – Zepp Nagoya (Nagoya)
- April 25 – Namba Hatch (Osaka)
- April 26 – Namba Hatch (Osaka)
- April 28 – Amagasaki Cultural Center (Amagasaki)
- April 30 – Zepp Tokyo (Tokyo)
- May 1 – Zepp Tokyo (Tokyo)

Deftones Summer Tour

- June 6 – Lupo's (Providence, RI)
- June 7 – Palladium (Worcester, MA)
- June 8 – Roseland Ballroom (New York City, NY)
- June 9 – Roseland Ballroom (New York City, NY)
- June 10 – Northern Lights (Albany, NY)
- June 11 – Dome Theatre (Niagara Falls, NY)
- June 12 – State Theatre (Detroit, MI)
- June 14 – The Orbit Room (Grand Rapids, MI)
- June 15 – Riviera (Chicago, IL)
- June 16 – Eagles Ballroom (Milwaukee, WI)
- June 17 – Myth (Minneapolis, MN)
- June 19 – Pageant (St. Louis, MO)
- June 20 – Cotillioin Ballroom (Wichita, KS)
- June 21 – Sokol Auditorium (Omaha, NE)
- June 22 – Fillmore (Denver, CO)
- June 23 – Salt Palace (Salt Lake City, UT)
- June 24 – Salt Palace (Salt Lake City, UT)
- June 26 – The Pearl (Las Vegas, NV)
- June 27 – Viejas (San Diego, CA)
- June 28 – Gibson Amphitheatre (Los Angeles, CA)
- June 29 – Rainbow Ballroom (Fresno, CA)
- June 30 – Santa Cruz Civic Auditorium (Santa Cruz, CA)
- July 2 – Warfield (San Francisco, CA)
- July 5 - The Theater at the Grand Sierra Resort (Reno, Nevada)
- July 6 – Roseland (Portland, OR)
- July 7 – Roseland (Portland, OR)
- July 8 – WaMu Theatre (Seattle, WA)

Dir En Grey supported The Marrow of a Bone with touring throughout 2006 and all of 2007. In 2006, Dir En Grey began their "Tour 06 Inward Scream" shows, with the debut show in August. The show featured several teaser tracks, making this the debut performance of "Conceived Sorrow", "Agitated Screams of Maggots", "Disabled Complexes", and "The Deeper Vileness". After featuring these teaser tracks in the later 2006 touring, the band started regularly rotating several new songs during the American tour, beginning in 2007. The album was released while Dir En Grey was on tour in the United States, however the band was not yet fully supporting the album.

In March, the band began "Tour 07 The Marrow of a Bone", thoroughly covering much of Japan and ending in the beginning of May. This tour introduced set-lists containing most of the tracks from The Marrow of a Bone, and was the first time many of the songs had been performed publicly. After the first leg of "The Marrow of a Bone" touring, Dir En Grey went on to another American tour, opening for Deftones in June and July. The short set-lists, due to their opening position, usually consisted of new material, giving the first performances of several songs in the United States.

Summer–fall touring
- The Marrow of a Bone (Europe)
- Dozing Green
- The Marrow of a Bone

Tour 07 The Marrow of a Bone (Europe)

- August 1 – Carling Academy (London, UK)
- August 2 – Carling Academy (London, UK)
- August 4 – Wacken Open Air (Wacken, DE)
- August 5 – Ankkarock (Helsinki, FN)
- August 7 – Arenan (Stockholm, SE)
- August 8 – Vega (Copenhagen, DN)
- August 10 – Alter Schlachthof (Dresden, DE)
- August 11 – M'era Luna (Hildesheim, DE)
- August 12 – Metal Hammer Festival (Katowice, PL)

Tour 07 Dozing Green

- September 13 – Club Citta Kawasaki (Kawasaki)
- September 14 – Club Citta Kawasaki (Kawasaki)
- September 18 – Site Kobe (Kobe)
- September 19 – Site Kobe (Kobe)
- September 21 – Hiroshima Club Quattro (Hiroshima)
- September 22 – Hiroshima Club Quattro (Hiroshima)
- September 24 – Zepp Fukuoka (Fukuoka)
- September 26 – Namba Hatch (Osaka)
- September 27 – Namba Hatch (Osaka)
- September 29 – Niigata Lots (Niigata)
- September 30 – Niigata Lots (Niigata)
- October 3 – Shinkiba Studio Coast (Tokyo)
- October 4 – Shinkiba Studio Coast (Tokyo)
- October 10 – KBS Hall (A Knot only) (Kyoto)
- October 11 – KBS Hall (A Knot only) (Kyoto)
- October 13 – Zepp Nagoya (Nagoya)
- October 14 – Zepp Nagoya (Nagoya)
- October 18 – Zepp Sendai (Sendai)
- October 20 – Zepp Sapporo (Sapporo)
- October 24 – Namba Hatch (Osaka)
- October 25 – Yokohama Blitz (Yokohama)

Tour 07 Dozing Green (Europe)

- November 2 – Shepherds Bush Empire (London, UK)
- November 4 – Tavastia (Helsinki, FN)
- November 5 – Tavastia (Helsinki, FN)
- November 7 – Melkweg (Amsterdam, NL)
- November 8 – Z7 (Pratteln, SWZ)
- November 10 – Le Zenith (Paris, FR)
- November 12 – Oxford Academy (Oxford, UK)
- November 14 – The Corporation (Sheffield, UK)

Linkin Park Japan Tour

- November 23 – Saitama Super Arena (Tokyo)
- November 24 – Saitama Super Arena (Tokyo)

Tour 07 The Marrow of a Bone with 10 Years

- December 5 – Yokohama Blitz (Yokohama)
- December 6 – Yokohama Blitz (Yokohama)
- December 8 – KBS Hall (Kyoto)
- December 9 – KBS Hall (Kyoto)
- December 11 – Zepp Nagoya (Nagoya)
- December 12 – Zepp Nagoya (Nagoya)
- December 14 – Namba Hatch (Osaka)
- December 15 – Namba Hatch (Osaka)
- December 17 – Shinkiba Studio Coast (Tokyo)
- December 18 – Shinkiba Studio Coast (Tokyo)
- December 19 – Shinkiba Studio Coast (Tokyo)
- December 22 – Zepp Tokyo (Tokyo)
- December 25 – Shinkiba Studio Coast (Tokyo)

Following American touring, "Tour 07 The Marrow of a Bone" continued, now in its European stage. The European tour, still supporting the album, including several festival appearances, brought Dir En Grey through the United Kingdom, Sweden, Denmark, Germany, Finland, and Poland. Upon returning to Japan, the band recorded and released a new single, "Dozing Green", and had a short tour supporting the new single, as well as the previous album. The "Dozing Green" tour also contained a short European leg, supporting the same material. "The Marrow of a Bone" tour concluded with a short Japan tour in December 2007, also featuring American band 10 Years as a support act. The finale took place with three consecutive shows at Shinkiba Studio Coast in Tokyo.

== Reception ==
Professional ratings
Review scores
Source	Rating
About.com	4/5 stars
AllMusic	4/5 stars
Billboard.com	(favorable)
Metal Hammer	8/10 stars
MusicOMH	4/5 stars
Ultimate Guitar	8.5/10

The album has received critical acclaim from music critics. Reviews by Apeshit, Billboard.com and About.com described it as Dir En Grey's best album to date, and a definite progression from their last effort, Withering to Death, which was also met by underground critical acclaim.

The album reached the second spot on CDJapan 2007 sales charts. The album charted on the Billboard "Top Heatseekers" chart at number 8, the "Top Independent Albums" at number 21, and again on the Oricon album charts at number 30.

== Track listing ==
All lyrics are written by Kyo; all music is composed by Dir En Grey.

Disc one
No.	Title	Length
1.	"Conceived Sorrow"	4:49
2.	"Lie Buried with a Vengeance"	2:43
3.	"The Fatal Believer"	3:11
4.	"Agitated Screams of Maggots"	2:57
5.	"Grief"	3:38
6.	"Ryōjoku no Ame" (凌辱の雨; "Rain of Violation")	4:03
7.	"Disabled Complexes"	3:56
8.	"Rotting Root"	4:45
9.	"Namamekashiki Ansoku, Tamerai ni Hohoemi" (艶かしき安息、躊躇いに微笑み; "A Charming Repose, Smiling in Hesitation")	4:38
10.	"The Pledge"	3:55
11.	"Repetition of Hatred"	4:33
12.	"The Deeper Vileness"	3:46
13.	"Clever Sleazoid"	3:12
Total length:		50:05

Disc two (unplugged, limited edition only)
No.	Title	Length
1.	"Namamekashiki Ansoku, Tamerai ni Hohoemi" (艶かしき安息、躊躇いに微笑み; "A Charming Repose, Similing in Hesitation")	4:29
2.	"Conceived Sorrow"	4:59
3.	"The Pledge"	3:51
Total length:		13:20

== Notes ==
- "The Deeper Vileness" was re-recorded and released on the second disc for the limited editions of their 2018 album The Insulated World.
- "Clever Sleazoid" was re-recorded and released as a B-side of the band's "Ochita Koto no Aru Sora" (落ちた事のある空, The Fallen Sky) single in 2020.

== Release history ==
Region	Date	Label	Format	Catalog
Japan	7 February 2007	Firewall/SMEJ	double-disc CD album	SFCD-0048~49
Japan	7 February 2007	Firewall/SMEJ	single-disc CD album	SFCD-0050
United States	20 February 2007	Warcon/Fontana	CD album	WRCN-15
Germany	2 March 2007	Gan-Shin	CD album	FWEAL003CD
France	6 March 2007	Gan-Shin	CD album	FWEAL003CD
United Kingdom	7 May 2007	Gan-Shin	CD album	FWEAL003CD
South Korea	20 November 2007	Ales Music	CD album	ALESCD-2062

== Personnel ==
- Dir En Grey – producer
  - Kyo – vocals, lyricist
  - Kaoru – guitar, composer, programming
  - Die – guitar, composer
  - Toshiya – bass guitar, composer
  - Shinya – drums, composer
- Yasushi "Koni-Young" Konishi – recording, mixing
- Akinori Kaizaki – recording, mixing
- Kazushige Yamazaki – mastering
- Dynamite Tommy – executive producer
- Koji Yoda – art direction
- Tadasuke – piano (on disc two)
- Yoshinori Abe – programming
