= The Insulated World =

Studio album by Dir En Grey
- Released: September 26, 2018
- Studio: Studio Sunshine
- Genres: Avant-garde metal; progressive metal
- Length: 50:27
- Languages: Japanese; English
- Labels: Firewall Div.; SMEJ
- Producers: Dir En Grey; Dynamite Tommy (exec.)

Dir En Grey chronology
Arche (2014)	The Insulated World (2018)	Phalaris (2022)

Alternative cover
- First press limited edition cover

Singles from The Insulated World
- 1. "Utafumi" Released: July 27, 2016; 2. "Ningen o Kaburu" Released: April 25, 2018

The Insulated World is the tenth studio album by Japanese heavy metal band Dir En Grey, released on September 26, 2018 via Firewall Div./SMEJ.

== Release ==
Professional ratings
Review scores
Source	Rating
AllMusic	4.5/5 stars
Killyourstereo.com	77/100
rockin'on.com	(Positive)

The Insulated World is the first album in 4 years since Arche. Remixed and remastered version of two pre-release singles "Utafumi" (詩踏み; "Treading On Poetry") and "Ningen o Kaburu" (人間を被る; "Wearing Human Skin") (with re-recorded vocals) are included exclusively for this release.

The Insulated World is available in three editions: regular edition, first press limited edition with a bonus CD and limited deluxe edition with a bonus CD as well as a bonus Blu-ray/DVD. The bonus CD in limited deluxe edition included new version of three old songs including "Kigan" (鬼眼; "Demon Eyes", from Kisō), "The Deeper Vileness" (from The Marrow of a Bone) and "Wake" (理由; "Reason", from Macabre) as well as live recordings of "Fukai" (腐海; "Decayed Sea") "Ash" and "Beautiful Dirt", taken from performance at Shinkiba Studio Coast in Kōtō, Tokyo, Japan on June 30, 2018. The bonus CD in first press limited edition only included "Kigan" as well as live recordings of "Fukai" and "Beautiful Dirt".

The bonus Blu-ray/DVD included live recordings taken from performances at Sendai Ginko Hall Izumity21 in Sendai, Miyagi Prefecture, Japan on April 28, 2018 and Shinkiba Studio Coast in Kōtō, Tokyo, Japan on April 30, 2018 (additional show), respectively.

== Track listing ==
All lyrics are written by Kyo; all music is composed by Dir En Grey.

No.	Title	Length
1.	"Keibetsu to Hajimari" (軽蔑と始まり; "Beginning with Disdain")	3:12
2.	"Devote My Life"	2:46
3.	"Ningen o Kaburu" (人間を被る; "Wearing Human Skin")	3:44
4.	"Celebrate Empty Howls"	3:22
5.	"Utafumi" (詩踏み; "Poetry Trampling")	3:07
6.	"Rubbish Heap"	3:06
7.	"Aka" (赫; "Red")	3:58
8.	"Values of Madness"	3:30
9.	"Downfall"	2:49
10.	"Followers"	4:40
11.	"Keigaku no Yoku" (谿壑の欲; "Insatiable Greed")	4:29
12.	"Zetsuentai" (絶縁体; "Insulator")	7:20
13.	"Ranunculus"	4:24
Total length:		50:27

First press limited edition bonus CD
No.	Title	Length
1.	"Kigan" (鬼眼; "Demon Eyes")	4:01
2.	"Fukai" (腐海; "Decayed Sea", Live Take at SHINKIBA STUDIO COAST on June 30, 2018)	5:29
3.	"Beautiful Dirt" (Live Take at SHINKIBA STUDIO COAST on June 30, 2018)	3:18
Total length:		12:48

Limited deluxe edition bonus CD
No.	Title	Length
1.	"Kigan" (鬼眼; "Demon Eyes")	4:01
2.	"The Deeper Vileness"	3:44
3.	"Wake" (理由; "Reason")	5:32
4.	"Fukai" (腐海; "Decayed Sea", Live Take at SHINKIBA STUDIO COAST on June 30, 2018)	5:29
5.	"Ash" (Live Take at SHINKIBA STUDIO COAST on June 30, 2018)	5:01
6.	"Beautiful Dirt" (Live Take at SHINKIBA STUDIO COAST on June 30, 2018)	3:18
Total length:		27:05

Limited deluxe edition bonus Blu-ray/DVD
No.	Title	Length
1.	"Ranunculus (Promotion Edit Ver.)" (music clip)
2.	"Different Sense" (live at Sendai Ginko Hall Izumity21 in Sendai, Miyagi Prefecture, Japan on April 28, 2018)
3.	"Karasu" (鴉; "Crow", live at Sendai Ginko Hall Izumity21 in Sendai, Miyagi Prefecture, Japan on April 28, 2018)
4.	"Disabled Complexes" (live at Sendai Ginko Hall Izumity21 in Sendai, Miyagi Prefecture, Japan on April 28, 2018)
5.	"Kiri to Mayu" (霧と繭; "Mist and Cocoon", live at Sendai Ginko Hall Izumity21 in Sendai, Miyagi Prefecture, Japan on April 28, 2018)
6.	"Vinushka" (live at Shinkiba Studio Coast in Kōtō, Tokyo, Japan on April 30, 2018 - additional show)
7.	"Audience Killer Loop" (live at Shinkiba Studio Coast in Kōtō, Tokyo, Japan on April 30, 2018 - additional show)
8.	"Repetition of Hatred" (live at Shinkiba Studio Coast in Kōtō, Tokyo, Japan on April 30, 2018 - additional show)
9.	"Behind a Vacant Image" (live at Shinkiba Studio Coast in Kōtō, Tokyo, Japan on April 30, 2018 - additional show)
10.	"Behind the Scenes of The Insulated World"

== Personnel ==
Dir En Grey

- Kyo (京) – lead vocals
- Kaoru (薫) – guitars, programming
- Die – guitars
- Toshiya – bass
- Shinya – drums

Additional musician

- Kazutaka Minemori – Master Tone

Production

- Dir En Grey – production
- Keisuke Kamata – recording
- Koji Maruyama – recording
- Ryosuke Ishida – engineering assistant
- Takashi Nemoto – engineering assistant
- Dan Lancaster – mixing
- Brian "Big Bass" Gardner – mastering
- Koji Yoda – cover art, art direction, design
- Rino Chihara – design
- Takao Ogata – photography
- Dynamite Tommy – executive producer

Production (bonus CD)

- Koji Maruyama – mixing
- Jens Bogren – mixing (on "Kigan", "The Deeper Vileness" and "Wake")

== Charts ==
Country	Provider(s)	Peak position	Sales/ shipments
Japan Weekly Albums	Oricon	6	21,767
