= Macabre (album) =

Studio album by Dir En Grey
- Released: September 20, 2000
- Recorded: Warner Studio, Studio Greenbird, WestSide Studio
- Genres: Experimental rock; alternative metal; progressive rock
- Length: 72:57
- Languages: Japanese; English; Russian
- Label: Firewall Div./SMEJ
- Producers: Dir En Grey; Tatsuya Sakamoto (Track 2); Hoppy Kamiyama (Track 7)

Dir En Grey chronology
Gauze (1999)	Macabre (2000)	Kisō (2002)

Singles from Macabre
- 1. "Myaku" Released: February 16, 2000; 2. "【KR】cube" Released: June 7, 2000; 3. "Taiyou no Ao" Released: July 26, 2000

Professional ratings
Review scores
Source	Rating
Sputnikmusic	2.5/5 stars

Macabre (stylized as MACABRE) is the second studio album by Japanese heavy metal band Dir En Grey. It was released on September 20, 2000. It was the band's first record to be released in collaboration of Free-Will's Firewall sub-division and Sony Music Entertainment Japan. The original print of Macabre featured an etched, tinted jewel case with five wooden beads placed within the spine. The album proper, like Gauze, included two booklets: one with the lyrics, and the other featuring a related image and poem.

== Track listing ==
All lyrics are written by Kyo

No.	Title	Music	Length
1.	"Deity"	Dir En Grey	4:15
2.	"Myaku" (脈; "Pulse")	Dir En Grey	4:05
3.	"Wake" (理由; "Reason")	Die	5:12
4.	"Egnirys Cimredopyh +) An Injection"	Toshiya	5:16
5.	"Hydra"	Kaoru	5:41
6.	"Hotarubi" (蛍火; "Light of a Firefly")	Shinya	6:06
7.	"【KR】cube"	Dir En Grey	4:09
8.	"Berry"	Kaoru	4:20
9.	"Macabre -Sanagi no Yume wa Ageha no Hane-" (MACABRE -揚羽ノ羽^{^{三}}ノ夢ハ^{^{二}}蛹^{^{一}}-; "The Chrysalis' Dream is the Swallowtail's Wings")	Kaoru	10:49
10.	"Audrey"	Die	4:33
11.	"Rasetsukoku" (羅刹国; "Rakshasa Country")	Dir En Grey	3:35
12.	"Zakuro" (ザクロ; "Pomegranate")	Kaoru	8:37
13.	"Taiyō no Ao" (太陽の碧; "Blue of the Sun")	Kaoru	6:19
Total length:			72:57

== Notes ==
- "Deity" is similar to the Russian word for children, "deti" ("дети"). The accompanying image in the lyric booklet is of a pregnant woman's stomach. A portion of the melody in "Deity" appears to be derived from Johannes Brahms' Hungarian Dance No. 5.
- "理由" is normally romanized as "riyū", yet is romanized by the band as "wake"; both "wake" ("訳") and "riyū" ("理由") can be translated as "reason".
- "Taiyō no Ao" uses a kanji that is commonly read as "midori" and means for "green", whereas the band uses a reading that means "blue".
- A rearrangement of the track "Hydra" appears on their 2007 single "Dozing Green" as a B-side, retitled to "Hydra -666-".
- A re-recording of the track "Rasetsukoku" appears as a bonus track on their 2011 album Dum Spiro Spero.
- A re-recording of the track "Macabre -Sanagi no Yume wa Ageha no Hane-" (simply titled "MACABRE") appears on the second disc of the Limited Edition of their 2013 mini-album The Unraveling.
- A re-recording of the track "Wake" appears on the second disc of the Limited Editions of their 2018 album The Insulated World.

== Charts ==
Chart performance for Macabre
Chart (2000)	Peak position
Japanese Albums (Oricon)	4

== Personnel ==
- Dir En Grey – producer
- Kyo – vocals, lyricist
- Kaoru – guitar
- Die – guitar
- Toshiya – bass guitar
- Shinya – drums
- Hoppy Kamiyama – producer
- Chieko Kinbara – violin (Hotarubi)
- Hiroshi "Dynamite Tommy" Tomioka – executive producer
- Koji Yoda – art director
- Hidemi Ogata – cover art
