= Arche (album) =

Studio album by Dir En Grey
- Released: December 10, 2014
- Genres: Avant-garde metal; progressive metal
- Length: 68:01
- Languages: Japanese, English
- Label: Firewall Div.

Dir En Grey chronology
| The Unraveling (2013) | Arche (2014) | The Insulated World (2018) |

Alternative cover
- Limited edition cover

Singles from Arche
- 1. "Rinkaku" Released: December 19, 2012; 2. "Sustain the Untruth" Released: January 22, 2014

Professional ratings
Review scores
| Source | Rating |
|---|---|
| Bloody Disgusting | 4/5 stars |
| Ultimate Guitar | 7/10 |
| AllMusic | 4/5 stars |
| rockin'on.com | (Positive) |

Arche (stylized as ARCHE, Greek for "the origin") is the ninth studio album by Japanese heavy metal band Dir En Grey, released on December 10, 2014. It was preceded by two singles; "Rinkaku", which was released two years prior, and "Sustain the Untruth".

== Overview ==
The contents of the album as well as the track list were added to the band's website in late September. At that time, the band's guitarist Die said it would be the most achieved sound that they have ever had. The album will deal with the theme of pain, as shown in a trailer narrated by Ryō Horikawa released on November 12.

The title stands for "origin" in Greek. This title connotes a special meaning to the members as it encompasses every phase the band has been evolving into. Vocalist Kyo said via Dir En Grey's website : "This album is being worked on with me thinking about the past and future of myself as a vocalist, more than I have had ever before. That place where the old me and the new me crosses is what is being put into the 9th album 'ARCHE'". The art cover suggests this symbolism by depicting a beheaded torso of a pregnant woman from which emanates roots.

== Track listing ==
All lyrics are written by Kyo; all music is composed by Dir En Grey.

Disc one
| No. | Title | Length |
|---|---|---|
| 1. | "Un Deux" | 3:33 |
| 2. | "Soshaku" (咀嚼; "Chew") | 4:10 |
| 3. | "Uroko" (鱗; "Scales") | 4:03 |
| 4. | "Phenomenon" | 4:01 |
| 5. | "Cause of Fickleness" | 3:25 |
| 6. | "Tōsei" (濤声; "Voice of the Waves") | 5:31 |
| 7. | "Rinkaku" (輪郭; "Silhouette") | 5:43 |
| 8. | "Chain Repulsion" | 2:48 |
| 9. | "Midwife" | 4:11 |
| 10. | "Magayasō" (禍夜想; "Calamitous Night Thought") | 4:25 |
| 11. | "Kaishun" (懐春; "Yearning of Youth") | 4:22 |
| 12. | "Behind a Vacant Image" | 4:59 |
| 13. | "Sustain the Untruth" | 4:25 |
| 14. | "Kūkoku no Kyōon" (空谷の跫音; "Tramplings In the Lonely Valley") | 5:48 |
| 15. | "The Inferno" | 3:15 |
| 16. | "Revelation of Mankind" | 3:23 |
| Total length: | | 68:01 |

Disc two ("Special" Limited Edition/ Limited Edition)
| No. | Title | Length |
|---|---|---|
| 1. | "And Zero" | 2:25 |
| 2. | "Tefutefu" (てふてふ; "Butterfly") | 4:47 |
| 3. | "Sustain the Untruth [Remix]" | 6:16 |
| 4. | "Unraveling [Remix]" | 3:33 |
| 5. | "Soshaku (Acoustic Ver.)" (咀嚼 (Acoustic Ver.); "Chew (Acoustic Ver.)") | 5:02 |
| 6. | "Uroko (Crossover Ver.)" (鱗 (Crossover Ver.); "Scales (Crossover Ver.)") | 3:39 |
| 7. | "Behind a Vacant Image (Acoustic Ver.)" | 4:55 |
| Total length: | | 30:37 |

Disc three ("Special" Limited Edition, Blu-Ray/ DVD)
| No. | Title | Length |
|---|---|---|
| 1. | "Un Deux (Shot In One Take)" |
| 2. | "Chain Repulsion (Shot In One Take)" |
| 3. | "Live footage from Tour14 Psychonnect -Mode of “Gauze”? at Shinkiba Studio Coast (08/30/2014)" (かすみ (Kasumi), 蜜と唾 (Tsumi to Batsu) and 激しさと、この胸の中で絡み付いた灼熱の闇 (Hageshisa to, Kono Mune no Naka de Karamitsuita Shakunetsu no Yami)) |
| 4. | "Behind the Scenes of Arche" |

- Disc 2 of the Limited Edition includes only tracks 3, 5, 6.

== Personnel ==
Dir En Grey

- Kyo – vocals, lyrics
- Kaoru – guitar, programming
- Die – guitar
- Toshiya – bass guitar
- Shinya – drums

Additional

- Takumi – programming
- Dynamite Tommy – executive producer
- Kei Kashiyama – drum production
- Tue Madsen – mixing, mastering
- Koji Maruyama – recording engineer
- Kimihiro Nakase – recording engineer
- Keisuke Kamata – recording engineer

== Chart performance ==
| Chart (2014) | Peak position |
|---|---|
| Oricon weekly chart | 4 |
| Billboard Japan Top Albums | 3 |
