= Missa (EP) =

EP by Dir En Grey
- Released: July 25, 1997; October 31, 2001 (re-issue)
- Recorded: May 1997
- Genre: Experimental rock
- Length: 31:22
- Language: Japanese, English
- Label: East West Japan (1997): Free-Will (2001)
- Producer: Dir En Grey

Dir En Grey chronology
Missa (1997)	Gauze (1999)

Professional ratings
Review scores
Source	Rating
Prog Archives	3/5 stars
Ultimate-Guitar	7.3/10

Missa (stylized as MISSA) is the debut EP by Japanese heavy metal band Dir En Grey, released on July 25, 1997.

== Background ==
Being the band's debut release, it consists of their earliest musical output, such as "Aoi Tsuki" (蒼い月), one of the first two songs the band ever recorded.

== Songs ==
Multiple songs off of the EP were reworked in one way or another throughout the band's career. "Garden" (stylized as "GARDEN") was re-recorded for the band's first video release, "Kaede" ~if trans...~ (「楓」~if trans…~), released in late 1997. "Byō""Shin" (秒「」深) was remade for the Six Ugly EP in 2002. "Kiri to Mayu" (霧と繭) was remade in 2012 and included on that year's "Rinkaku" single.

Technically however, this was not the first time "Kiri to Mayu" was reworked. The song was originally called "Sangeki no Yoru" (惨劇の夜), but one day before the recording of Missa began, Kyo was asked to change the lyrics. Throughout 1997, the song was only performed with the lyrics of "Kiri to Mayu". When "Kaede" ~if trans...~ was released, it came with a music video for "Sangeki no Yoru" and from then on, Kyo began to perform the song with its originally intended lyrics instead. A similar case was "Karma" (業), the other of the band's first two songs. They intended to include it on Missa, but decided against it and released it on "Kaede" ~if trans...~ as well.

== Track listing ==
All lyrics are written by Kyo; all music is composed by Dir En Grey, except where noted

Tracklist
No.	Title	Music	Length
1.	"Kiri to Mayu" (霧と繭; "Fog and Cocoon")	Kaoru	5:06
2.	"「S」"	Kyo	3:31
3.	"Erode"	Toshiya	6:30
4.	"Aoi Tsuki" (蒼い月; "Blue Moon")		5:04
5.	"Garden"		5:27
6.	"Byō""Shin" (秒「」深; "One Second""Deep")	Kaoru	5:39
Total length:			31:22

== Personnel ==
- Dir En Grey
  - Kyo – vocals, lyricist
  - Kaoru – guitar
  - Die – guitar
  - Toshiya – bass guitar
  - Shinya – drums
- Kimisada Kato – Co-producer
