= Ain't Afraid to Die =

Single by Dir En Grey
- Released: April 18, 2001
- Genre: Progressive rock
- Length: 19:22
- Label: Firewall Div. SMEJ
- Producers: Dir En Grey; Toru Yamazaki

Dir En Grey singles chronology
| "Taiyō no Ao" (2000) | "Ain't Afraid to Die" (2001) | "Filth" (2001) |

"Ain't Afraid to Die" (stylized as "ain't afraid to die") is a single released by Dir En Grey on April 18, 2001. It appears on Decade 1998–2002 but is not featured on any of their studio albums. Both B-sides are included on the Kai remix compilation.

== Track listing ==
All lyrics are written by Kyo; all music is composed by Dir En Grey.

| No. | Title | Length |
|---|---|---|
| 1. | "Ain't Afraid to Die" | 7:16 |
| 2. | "Ain't Afraid to Die ~With Frosted Ambience~" (remix by Die) | 5:49 |
| 3. | "Ain't Afraid to Die Irrésistible Mix" (remix by Shinya) | 6:14 |

=== Note ===
- A re-recording of "Ain't Afraid to Die" appears on the second disc of the Limited and Deluxe Editions of their 2022 album Phalaris.

== Chart position ==
| Year | Chart | Position |
|---|---|---|
| 2001 | Oricon | 7 |

== Personnel ==
- Dir En Grey – producer
  - Kyo – vocals
  - Kaoru – guitar
  - Die – guitar
  - Toshiya – bass guitar
  - Shinya – drums
- Toru Yamazaki – producer
- Gen Ittetsu Strings – orchestra
- MC Kids – choir
- Koji Yoda – art director
