= Vulgar (album) =

Studio album by Dir En Grey
- Released: September 10, 2003 (JP); February 21, 2006 (EU)
- Recorded: 2002–2003
- Studio: Studio Greenbird, Studio Fine, Cats Studio, Studio Inning, On Air Azabu, Sound City, Studio Z'd
- Genre: Alternative metal; nu metal; industrial metal
- Length: 57:02
- Language: Japanese, English
- Label: Firewall Div./SMEJ (JP); Gan-Shin (EU)
- Producer: Dir En Grey & Tatsuya Sakamoto

Dir En Grey chronology
| Kisō (2002) | Vulgar (2003) | Withering to Death (2005) |

Singles from Vulgar
- 1. "Child Prey" Released: July 31, 2002; 2. "Drain Away" Released: January 22, 2003; 3. "Kasumi" Released: April 23, 2003

Professional ratings
Review scores
| Source | Rating |
|---|---|
| Ultimate Guitar | 8.8/10 |
| Nihon Review | 8/10 stars |
| CD Data | (Positive) |
| CD Journal | (Positive) |

Vulgar (stylized as VULGAR) is the fourth studio album by Japanese heavy metal band Dir En Grey released on September 10, 2003 in Japan and on February 21, 2006 in Europe. A limited edition containing an additional DVD was also released. It featured the video of the song "Obscure", albeit a censored version. Vulgar is the first Dir En Grey release not to feature individual credits for the music, though the preceding singles featured individual credits.

== Track listing ==
All lyrics are written by Kyo; all music is composed by Dir En Grey, except where noted.

| No. | Title | Length |
|---|---|---|
| 1. | "Audience Killer Loop" | 3:39 |
| 2. | "The IIID Empire" | 3:05 |
| 3. | "Increase Blue" | 3:46 |
| 4. | "Shokubeni" (蝕紅; "Ruined Crimson") | 4:20 |
| 5. | "Sajō no Uta" (砂上の唄; "Song on the Sand") | 3:14 |
| 6. | "Red…[em]" | 5:01 |
| 7. | "Asunaki Koufuku, Koenaki Asu" (明日無き幸福、呼笑亡き明日; "Happiness Without a Tomorrow, a Tomorrow Where Laughter Has Died") | 3:31 |
| 8. | "Marmalade Chainsaw" | 4:13 |
| 9. | "Kasumi" (かすみ; "Haze") (Kaoru) | 4:20 |
| 10. | "Я to the Core" | 1:47 |
| 11. | "Drain Away" (Die) | 4:06 |
| 12. | "New Age Culture" | 3:19 |
| 13. | "Obscure" | 3:59 |
| 14. | "Child Prey" (Kaoru) | 3:52 |
| 15. | "Amber" | 4:48 |
| Total length: | | 57:02 |

=== Personnel ===
- Dir En Grey
  - Kyo - Vocals, lyricist
  - Die - Guitar, composer
  - Kaoru - Guitar, composer
  - Toshiya - Bass guitar, composer
  - Shinya - Drums, composer

=== Notes ===
- A re-recording of "Shokubeni" appears as a b-side on their 2009 single "Hageshisa to, Kono Mune no Naka de Karamitsuita Shakunetsu no Yami", recorded only in one take.
- A re-recording of "Obscure" appears as a b-side on their 2011 single "Lotus".
- A re-recording of "Kasumi" appears on their 2013 mini-album The Unraveling.
- A re-recording of "The IIID Empire" appears on their 2018 "best of" compilation Vestige of Scratches.

== Charts ==
Chart performance for Vulgar
| Chart (2003) | Peak position |
|---|---|
| Japanese Albums (Oricon) | 6 |
