= Oedema glottidis =

- Specialty: Otorhinolaryngology

Oedema glottidis is defined as the abnormal accumulation of fluid in tissues involving the supraglottic and subglottic region where laryngeal mucosa is loose. It is also known as laryngeal oedema.
