= Dir En Grey =

Japanese heavy metal band

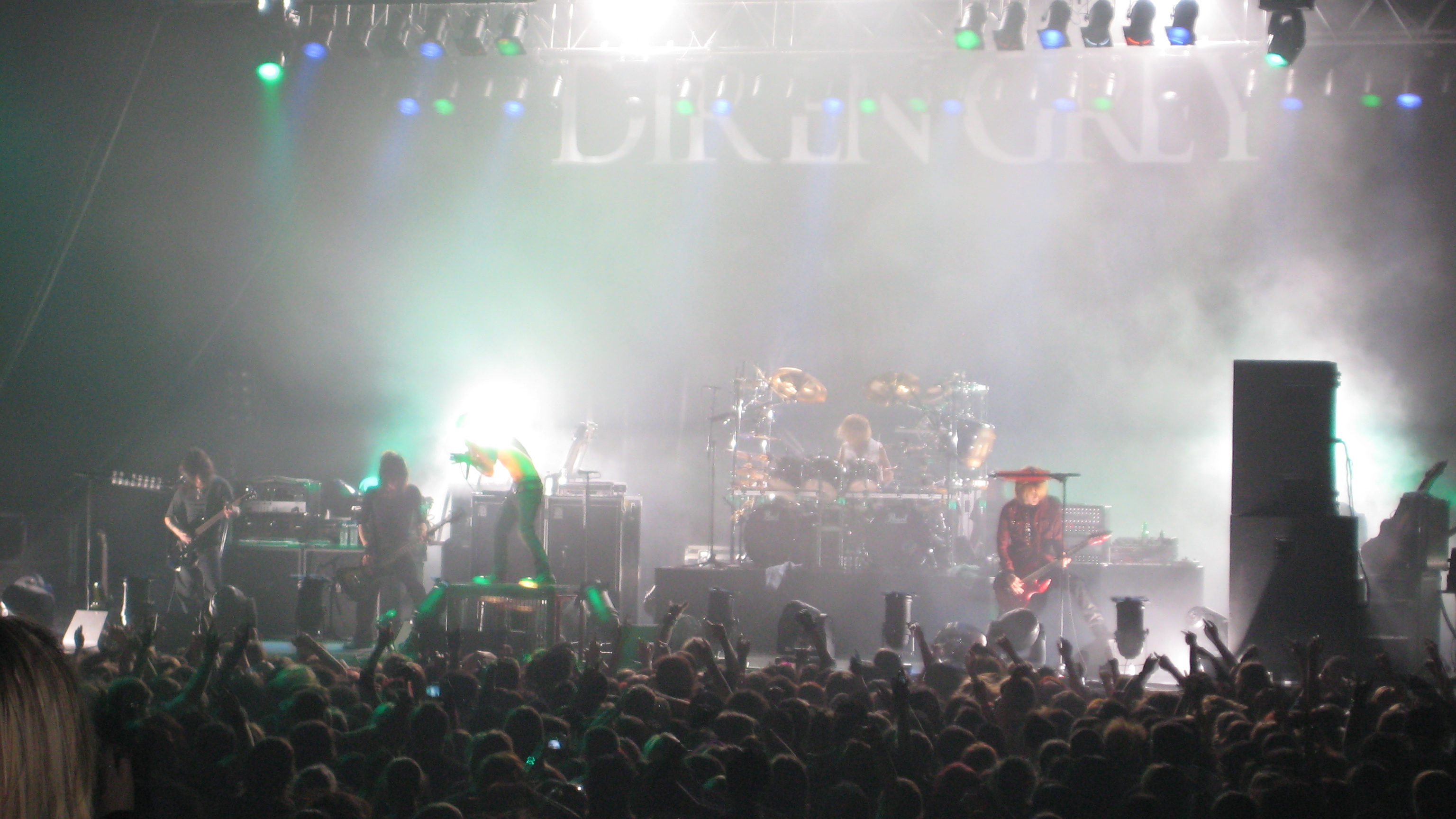
- Dir En Grey performing in Paris in 2007

Background information
- Origin: Osaka, Japan
- Genres: Avant-garde metal; progressive metal; extreme metal; alternative metal
- Works: Dir En Grey discography
- Years active: 1997–present
- Labels: Firewall Div.; SMEJ; Okami; The End; Gan-Shin; Warcon Enterprises
- Members: Kyo; Kaoru; Die; Toshiya; Shinya
- Website: www.direngrey.co.jp

Dir En Grey (stylized as DIR EN GREY and previously as Dir en grey) is a Japanese heavy metal band formed in February 1997 and currently signed to Firewall Div., a sub-division of Free-Will. With a consistent lineup of vocalist Kyo, guitarists Kaoru and Die, bassist Toshiya, and drummer Shinya, they have released twelve full-length albums. Numerous stylistic changes have made the genre of their music difficult to determine, though it is generally considered to be a form of metal. Originally a visual kei band, the members later opted for more subtle attire, but have continued to maintain a dramatic image on stage.

== History ==
=== 1995–1999: La:Sadie's, formation and major debut ===
Dir En Grey was preceded by the independent rock band La:Sadie's, which was formed by vocalist Kyo and bassist Kisaki in November 1995. They were joined by guitarists Die and Shio, as well as drummer Shinya, and made their live debut on January 14, 1996. Shio seceded after three shows and Kaoru joined them in April 1996. After a very successful independent career and over 80 shows in one year of activity, La:Sadie's disbanded on January 15, 1997. The reasons for the disbandment are unknown, but later statements made by the individual members hint at disagreements between bassist Kisaki and the other members in regards to their status as an independent band. Kisaki said he was asked to leave the band and that he failed to take care of the other members, "I thought doing lots of good live shows would please the members, but I was wrong. By not giving them time to rest and deciding on recording schedules in between, I must have put a lot of stress and burden on them." After parting ways with Kisaki, members Kaoru, Kyo, Die and Shinya recruited bassist Toshiya and regrouped as a new band. After playing one show as a Kuroyume cover-band called "Deathmask" at the live house Nagano J on January 24, they officially formed Dir En Grey on February 2, 1997.

The band name is a combination of German "dir", French "en" and English "grey" and was thought to mean "Grey Silver Coin" (灰色の銀貨, Haiiro no Ginka); the Japanese translation was used as the name of their fanclub's magazine. They wanted to convey a musical image that was neither black nor white, so they picked grey. In an early interview, vocalist Kyo explained that he knew the name before the band was formed. During the WOWOW Special in 2020, Kaoru elaborates that they took the name from another band that was famous around that time. This band was Lareine, who had released a song called "Dir en gray" in 1995. The song starts with the line "Haiiro no anata ni dir en gray" (灰色のあなたに dir en gray), with the part written in the Latin alphabet having the same meaning as the Japanese part, namely "to you in grey". In a later interview, Kaoru explained that "at the time we chose the band name, it had some meaning but right now it doesn't express the band anymore, so it has come to not mean anything specific. We chose the band name because it sounded right, and it also reflects an image that probably doesn't exist elsewhere."

They released their first EP, Missa, a few months later and attracted mainstream attention in 1998, by entering the top ten on the Oricon music charts with the still independently produced songs "Jealous" and "-I'll-". Five subsequent singles, arranged and produced by X Japan co-founder Yoshiki, were published during the first half of 1999. The band's first full-length record, Gauze, followed. One of the shows in support for the album (filmed at the Osaka-jo Hall) would later become the first of several live concerts to be released on VHS and DVD.

=== 2000–2004: From Macabre to Vulgar ===
In 2000, vocalist Kyo was hospitalized with hearing trouble and several dates of the tour in support of Dir En Grey's then-upcoming album, Macabre, had to be postponed. Tour 00 >> 01 Macabre eventually took off later the same year and was concluded at Nippon Budokan shortly after the release of the single "Ain't Afraid to Die" in April 2001.

In the following year, along with the release of a third full-length album, Kisō, Dir En Grey gave their first performances abroad, touring China, Taiwan, and South Korea. Back in Japan, the last dates of the lengthy Rettou Gekishin Angya tour were already in support for the band's second EP, Six Ugly. In the same year, they released the single "Child Prey", which was featured as the second opening theme of the Baki the Grappler anime series, and also the beginning of their fourth album called Vulgar. In summer 2003, Dir En Grey performed at Akasaka Blitz for five evenings in a single week, with each show (except the first) themed after a certain album, the last featuring songs from the then yet to be released Vulgar. A DVD set, titled Blitz 5 Days, was later released exclusively for members of the band's official fan club, titled "A Knot". Vulgar was released in September 2003 and tours in support for the record would last well into 2004.

=== 2005–2006: Early non-Asian touring ===
In 2005, Dir En Grey performed in Europe for the first time. Their concerts in Berlin and Paris (as part of the It Withers and Withers tour) sold out without promotion save for newsletters by import record stores and internet-based word of mouth.

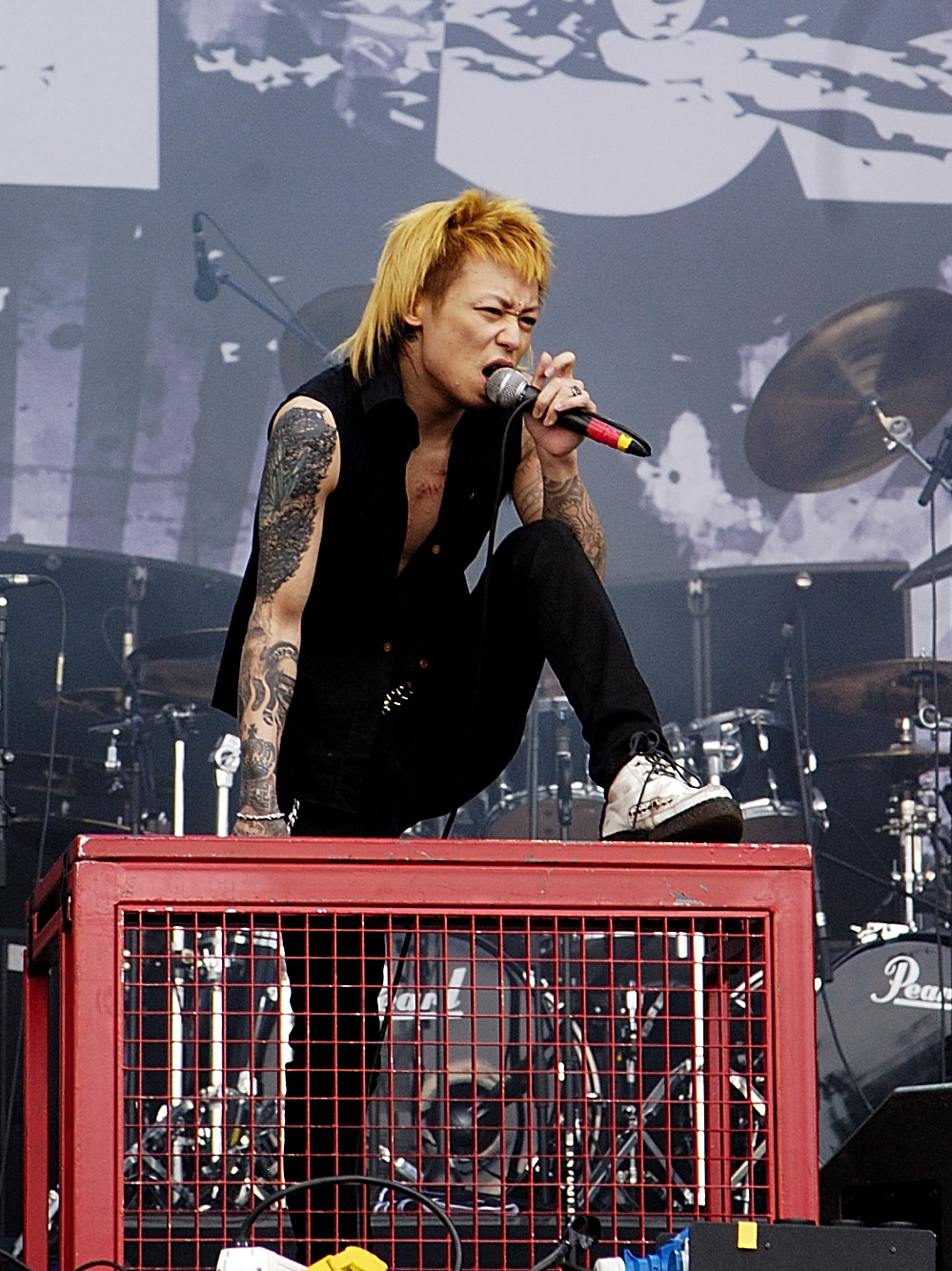
Kyo performing live at Rock im Park in 2006

The band also performed at two major festivals, Rock am Ring and Rock im Park. Becoming more involved with the international music scene, French band Eths opened for them at the Paris concert and Dir En Grey invited American musician Wednesday 13 and his band to play at a show in Japan. Dir En Grey also appeared at the Japanese leg of that year's Taste of Chaos tour.

2005 saw the group's first official European releases as well, beginning with Withering to Death. The band's music had previously been available through means of import and Internet file-sharing only for European fans. The album achieved Dir En Grey's first non-Asian chart position, reaching No. 31 in the Finnish album charts. The subsequent single, "Clever Sleazoid", later climbed to No. 15 on the singles charts in the same country. Several Dir En Grey songs were also featured in the soundtrack of the 2005 film Death Trance.

In early 2006 touring expanded to the United States. The band performed in Austin, Texas, at the South by Southwest festival, New York City at the Avalon Club and Los Angeles, California, at the Wiltern Theatre, followed by the North American release of Withering to Death. Again, all shows sold out within days. After more concerts and festival appearances in Germany during the summer, singer Kyo was again hospitalized due to inflamed vocal cords. While two concert dates in Japan had to be postponed, Dir En Grey was still able to join Korn's Family Values Tour 2006. In October, the band was back in Japan to perform at the Loudpark Festival, along with bands such as Megadeth, Slayer and Children of Bodom. Their 22nd single "Agitated Screams of Maggots" was released on 15 November during the Japanese leg of the Inward Scream tour. On 30 December, the music video for -Saku- was voted the No. 1 video of the year on the MTV2 show Headbangers Ball.

=== 2007–2009: The Marrow of a Bone and Uroboros ===
In February, Dir En Grey went on its first North American headlining tour, visiting sixteen cities as its sixth full-length album The Marrow of a Bone was released on February 7 in Japan and in the United States and Europe in the following months. It saw a change in capitalization of the band name, from a sentence case capitalization ("Dir en grey") to an all caps variant ("DIR EN GREY"). From May to July, the group opened for the Deftones on their United States tour and afterwards did another European tour, which included their debut shows in Denmark, Finland, Poland, Sweden, and the United Kingdom, as well as several festival performances across the continent, including Ankkarock, M'era Luna Festival and Wacken Open Air.

The group went on another international tour in September named after their most recent single "Dozing Green", beginning in Japan and continuing in Europe, including their first performance in the Netherlands and Switzerland. In late November, Dir En Grey opened two shows for Linkin Park at Saitama Super Arena and in December performed another Japan tour with 10 Years as a supporting act. Commemorating Dir En Grey's tenth anniversary as a band, two greatest hits compilations, titled Decade 1998–2002 and Decade 2003–2007 respectively, were released on December 19.

At the beginning of 2008, Dir En Grey announced plans to begin recording a new studio album. Their first touring of the year in May was another Japan tour with a conclusion of three shows at Shinkiba Studio Coast, titled Death over Blindness. Between touring, Dir En Grey performed at one night of the two-night hide memorial summit on May 4, alongside X Japan, Luna Sea, and others. A second Japanese tour, titled Tour 08 The Rose Trims Again began on September 10, the same day as the release of their single "Glass Skin".

On August 1, Dir En Grey announced the release of their seventh studio album, Uroboros, which was released on November 11, 2008, in the United States. The band also toured the United States and Canada in support of the album, with dates scheduled for November and December (overlapping the release of Uroboros) with opening act The Human Abstract. Touring that fall included a series of four shows titled Bajra, two being fan-club exclusive, and a single show on December 29 under the moniker Uroboros -Breathing- at the famous Osaka-jo Hall where Dir En Grey had not performed since December 18, 1999 (as seen on 1999.12.18 Osakajo Hall).

Beginning in 2009, Dir En Grey made their first thorough tour of the United Kingdom and Ireland with Kerrang!'s "Relentless Tour '09" alongside Mindless Self Indulgence, Bring Me the Horizon, Black Tide and In Case of Fire. In February, the band announced the public release of the live DVD, Tour 08 The Rose Trims Again, as well as switching European record labels to the newly founded Okami Records, a sister label of their former European representation, Gan-Shin.

During spring of 2009, the band began to fully promote Uroboros with a series of nationwide tours under the title Tour 09 Feast of V Senses. The tour was interrupted briefly while in Sapporo and Sendai, with an announcement on the band's official website, explaining that Kyo had been diagnosed with edema of the larynx, and would require the postponement of three shows, which were rescheduled for early May.

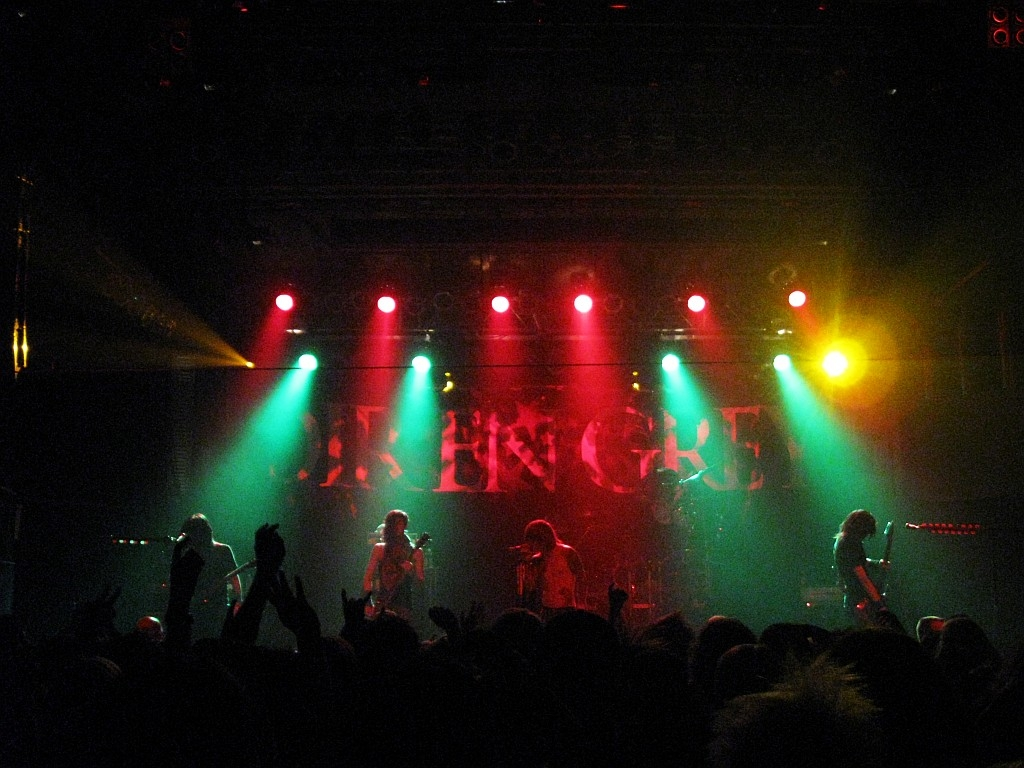
Dir En Grey in Saarbrücken, Germany, in 2009

Dir En Grey continued their Feast of V Senses tour in Europe, with a mixture of festival performances, headlining shows, and one co-headlining show with Killswitch Engage. The festival performances included their third appearances at Rock am Ring and Rock im Park, as well as their initial concerts at Download Festival, Nova Rock, and Metaltown. Among the headlining shows, Dir En Grey were also making debut concerts in Italy and the Czech Republic.

After several shows of their late-summer tour, All Visible Things, Dir En Grey announced their next single for December, "Hageshisa to, Kono Mune no Naka de Karamitsuita Shakunetsu no Yami", as well as a North American and South American tour also under the title All Visible Things. Their new single was released on December 2, 2009, and reached number 2 on the Oricon Weekly Chart: the highest position to date for the band. Their 2009 tour season ended with a three-live tour titled Dorje. They finally ended their long Uroboros centered tour by doing two back to back performances at the Nippon Budokan, titled Uroboros: with the proof in the name of living..., where tickets sold out in 15 minutes.

=== 2010–2013: Dum Spiro Spero and The Unraveling ===
It was announced on April 7, 2010, that the band would be returning to the United Kingdom in August on the lineup for the Sonisphere Festival in Knebworth, playing on a bill headlined by Iron Maiden and Rammstein. According to the festival website, this was to be their only UK festival performance during the year. Regarding the announcement, Kaoru (on the Sonisphere UK website) is quoted as saying: "I'd never have thought that we would play a festival of this caliber! It is like a dream come true to be playing with such great bands at Sonisphere. Although we're not back in the UK for a tour, we wanted to play this festival to give something back to the fans who were disappointed last year from our cancelled finale in London."

It was announced on April 28, 2010, that Dir En Grey would be playing an exclusive club date at London's Koko venue on August 3 as part of The Unwavering Fact of Tomorrow Tour 2010. Dir En Grey announced later on that they also would do their debut performances in Russia by adding one show in Moscow at Tochka Club on August 5 and one show in St Petersburg at Glav Club on August 6. Dir En Grey also toured North America on a co-headlining tour with the Finnish band Apocalyptica with a special guest of Kyo interpreting the song "Bring Them to Light", one of the tracks of the cello-metalers latest record.

In September 2010 the band confirmed in an interview with Kerrang! magazine that they were in the process of writing new material for the follow-up to Uroboros. In addition to "Hageshisa to, Kono Mune no Naka de Karamitsuita Shakunetsu no Yami" appearing on the soundtrack of the American movie Saw 3D, they also participated on December 1, 2010's Romantist - The Stalin, Michiro Endo Tribute Album by covering "Warushawa no Gensō" in celebration of the 60th birthday of The Stalin's frontman Michiro Endo. The album also featured bands such as Buck-Tick, Group Tamashii, Merry, Jun Togawa, and Wagdug Futuristic Unity.

The single "Lotus" was released on January 26, 2011, along with a new fan-club only tour named The Decomposition of the Moon, scheduled to run from May 14 to 26. The band released "Different Sense" on June 22. On August 1, 2011, Dir En Grey released an open letter on their official Facebook that accused the Japanese government of lying to its people and hiding the true danger of the radiation levels after the nuclear accidents caused by the 2011 Tōhoku earthquake and tsunami. In October, the band launched a campaign called Scream for the Truth, complete with a website and a billboard hanging in Times Square in New York City, in hopes of stopping the alleged misinformation and getting correct numbers. Their eighth studio album, Dum Spiro Spero, was released on August 3. Material from this album was showcased on the band's South and North American tour Age Quod Agis in November and December 2011.

In February 2012, following a doctor's visit, vocalist Kyo was diagnosed with vocal nodule dysphonia, leading to Dir En Grey pulling out of the North American The Still Reckless Tour consisting of Asking Alexandria, Trivium, Motionless in White, and I See Stars. Although Kyo had been hospitalized before in 2006 and 2009 for vocal inflammation, he had not required surgery until this time. Kyo later stated that his condition was treated with medication.

On August 11, 2012, Dir En Grey won the Extreme Metal Olympics organized by Loudwire, beating Death in the final. The band released the single "Rinkaku" on December 19 after their one-year and a half hiatus since their previous single release. Also, a tour titled In Situ began on December 25 in Tokyo.

On April 3, 2013, they released their third EP, titled The Unraveling, with one new song and six re-recordings. Just a couple of days later on April 5, the band started their supporting tour Tabula Rasa for the new EP. In June 2013, the band participated in a short European tour.

In September 2013, the band started their Ghoul tour, which ran from September 18 until October 23 in Japan and continued on November 3 in North America. The band also announced two back-to-back shows at the Nippon Budokan for March 2014 titled "Dum Spiro Spero" along with a new single, "Sustain the Untruth", which was released in January 2014.

=== 2014–2021: Arche and The Insulated World ===
During the month of August in 2014, the band celebrated the 15th anniversary of their debut album, Gauze. During this time, they embarked on a Japanese tour titled Tour14 Psychonnect: Mode of "Gauze"?, similarly named after the tour they held back in 1999 in support of the album.

On August 5, 2014, it was announced that Dir En Grey's ninth album, Arche, would be released on December 10, 2014. After its release, the album was accompanied by the 2014–2015 tour By the Grace of God. The tour was followed by another one called The Unstoppable Life, in April and May 2015. On 27 June 2015, Dir En Grey performed at Luna Sea's Lunatic Fest at Makuhari Messe. On 5–6 February 2016, Dir En Grey performed their album Arche at Nippon Budokan with a June 2016 release date of Blu-ray & DVD.

The band released a single, "Utafumi", in July 2016. They also embarked on various tours based around previous albums called Tour16-17 From Depression To ________ [mode of Vulgar], Tour16-17 From Depression To ________ [mode of Dum Spiro Spero], and Tour16-17 From Depression to ________ [mode of 鬼葬] from June to November 2016.

In 2017, the band did further tours themed around previous albums They also covered "Easy Make, Easy Mark" by D'erlanger for the D'erlanger Tribute Album ~Stairway to Heaven~.

Their compilation album, Vestige of Scratches, was released on January 2, 2018. Dir En Grey's twenty-ninth single "Ningen wo Kaburu" was released on April 25, 2018. One of its B-sides is a remake of "Ash", a song with origins as far back as 1997.

On June 29, 2018, Dir En Grey announced that their tenth studio album The Insulated World was to be released on September 26, 2018. The band also announced a European tour to start in October 2018, under the title "Wearing Human Skin". They followed this tour with a North American tour in December 2019 and another European tour in January and February 2020.

Their 30th single, "The World of Mercy", released on September 18, 2019. They provided a cover of "National Media Boys" for the January 29, 2020 Buck-Tick tribute album Parade III ~Respective Tracks of Buck-Tick~

Their 31st single, "Ochita Koto no Aru Sora" was released digitally on August 3, 2020.

On April 28, 2021, they released their 32nd single, "Oboro".

=== 2022–present: Phalaris and Mortal Downer ===
Their 11th studio album, Phalaris, was released on June 15, 2022. For the 25th anniversary of their singles "Akuro no Oka", "Yurameki", and "-Zan-", the single "19990120" was released on January 17, 2024. On April 24, 2024, the band released their thirty-fourth single "The Devil In Me". Dir En Grey's 12th studio album, Mortal Downer, was on April 8, 2026.

== Musical style and influences ==
"Yokan"
Sample of 1999's Yokan, showing the band's early sound.

"Hageshisa to, Kono Mune no Naka de Karamitsuita Shakunetsu no Yami"
Sample of the band's highest-charting single, released in 2009.

Dir En Grey has been categorized in many genres such as extreme metal, alternative, experimental, avant-garde and various others. Dir En Grey's format has been subject to change throughout their career, initially being a rather experimental form of alternative rock. Some tracks of their debut album Gauze also demonstrated a distinct pop appeal, which was largely dropped in favor of a more progressive sound on the following albums, Macabre and Kisou. While up to that point some songs had already been more fast-paced, raw and aggressive than others, the band's music took a decisive turn with the release of the EP Six Ugly, from then on sporting more metal influences in general. Dir En Grey's style gravitated towards riffs and song structures more along the lines of contemporary North American fusion genres, such as nu metal and metalcore, until 2007's The Marrow of a Bone. In a review of their sixth full-length album, The Marrow of a Bone, AllMusic's Thom Jurek comments on their evolution and diversity, saying:

The band's sound has embraced tendencies of American metal and nu metal (they participated in Korn's Family Values tour in America), and Dir En Grey bring so many other sonic and musical elements into the mix that they extend not only the reach of their own music, but the boundaries of any music they happen to incorporate into their sound.

— Thom Jurek, Allmusic

Since the release of their album Uroboros in 2008, Dir En Grey have been repeatedly described as progressive metal. Uroboros and their 2011 album Dum Spiro Spero represent a particular musical departure from previous albums, with critics noting that their sound on these albums bears almost nothing in common to their earliest work. With Uroboros, and particularly on Dum Spiro Spero, the band have moved away from their alternative rock roots towards a heavier metal sound. These albums feature complex song structures and guitarwork, longer track lengths, and a broader variety of particularly western influences, such as death metal, deathcore and groove metal.

Kyo's singing is considered a pivotal aspect of the band, and he has gained recognition for his distinctive vocal work and for his large range and versatility, being able to "howl, croon, emote cleanly, scream, shriek, growl, bellow, and make nearly inhuman sounds." Jurek has compared him favorably to experimental and avant-garde vocalists Mike Patton and Diamanda Galas. Loudwire wrote "Sporting incredibly low death metal gutturals, Kyo can also turn a complete 180 as one of metal's highest shriekers." Dane Prokofiev of PopMatters said that his "natural ease at and inclination towards striking such a stark contrast between the two opposite ends of the human vocal spectrum can be obtained as only a kind of pre-birth winning lottery ticket—you know, that much coveted prize we call "talent"."

Commentators have noted how Dir En Grey have gained a significant international fanbase with vocals in Japanese. Kaoru said "when I was growing up, I listened to American bands. They were all singing in English and I had no idea what they were saying. But I still remember the excitement that I experienced. I know as a listener that our fans can connect to our music in the same way — even with the language barrier." When asked why they almost always use Japanese instead of English, which would give them more broad international appeal, he said that "We consider our music [to be] a piece of art. [...] The language is part of that artwork." The guitarist explained that Kyo, who writes all of the lyrics, prefers "the sensitivities that Japanese language offers. There are expressions and nuances that can only be conveyed in Japanese; he values that." However, he noted that likewise there are some expressions that are only able to be shown in English, so they also plan to use English when they feel the need. The lyrics deal with subjects such as society and mass media, as well as sexual obsessions and love, usually with negative implications. The vocabulary varies from subtle to explicit (though the use of profanity has greatly decreased as the band matured, last featuring on Uroboros), and several songs rely heavily on double entendres and other wordplay, often involving the multiple meanings of a kanji character.

Although they got their start as a visual kei band, the members of Dir En Grey seem to be irked being associated with the term in some later interviews. Speaking of the change in their appearance, Kaoru said "Eventually, we felt that dressing like we used to onstage put up a wall between us and the audience, so we stopped wearing the kind of makeup we did before." However, he said they still occasionally wear makeup, just not as much. Toshiya explained "To be honest, when we first started and we were wearing a lot of makeup on stage and stuff, there were a lot of bands doing that at the time in Japan, and people thought it was cool. But not anymore, ha ha." Die said "They saw us as idols but we aren't idols. We are a band, we play music and want to be known for it. So we decided to change our style slowly." Kyo stated that for Dir En Grey it was always about the music and when wearing lots of makeup became popular, "we didn't want to be associated with a lot of the poor quality bands in that scene."

Dir En Grey have created some controversy in Japan as some of their music videos have been banned from television for "abrasive visuals including baby-eating, murder, [and] gore." Similarly, stations refused to play the video for 2008's "Vinushka" which included stock footage of World War II and newspaper headlines following the atomic bombings of Hiroshima and Nagasaki.

Kyo cited Bauhaus's Press the Eject and Give Me the Tape and David Sylvian's Secrets of the Beehive as his favorite albums. Kaoru listed X's Blue Blood, Pantera's Vulgar Display of Power, Nine Inch Nails' The Downward Spiral, The Beatles' 1962–1966 and 1967–1970 in his favorite albums list. Die's inspirations included D'erlanger's La Vie En Rose and Ziggy's Kool Kizz. Toshiya hailed Alice in Chains' Dirt and Radiohead's OK Computer. Shinya cited Aion's Absolute and Gargoyle's Furebumi as his influences.

== Members ==
Dir En Grey

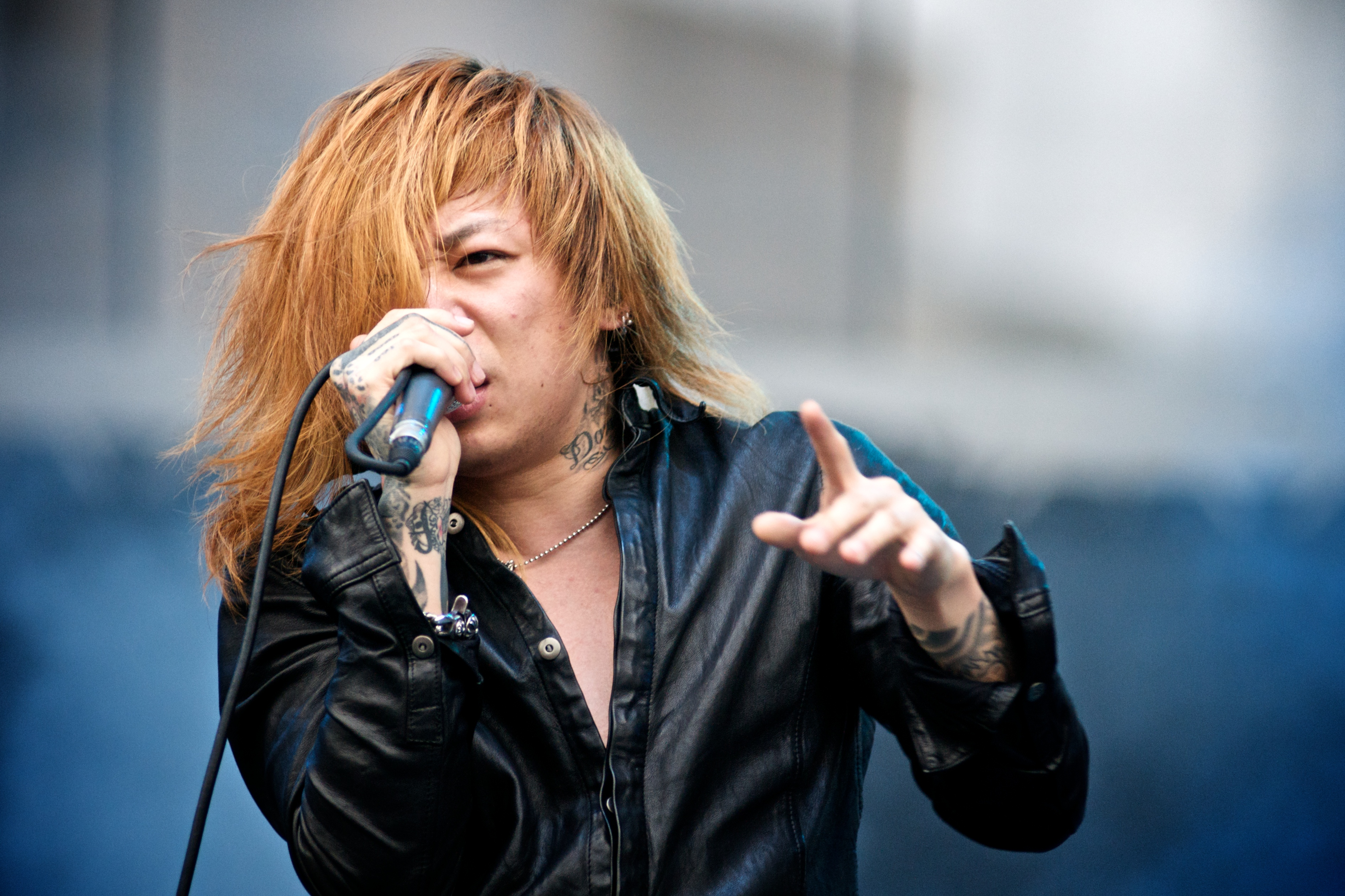
Kyo

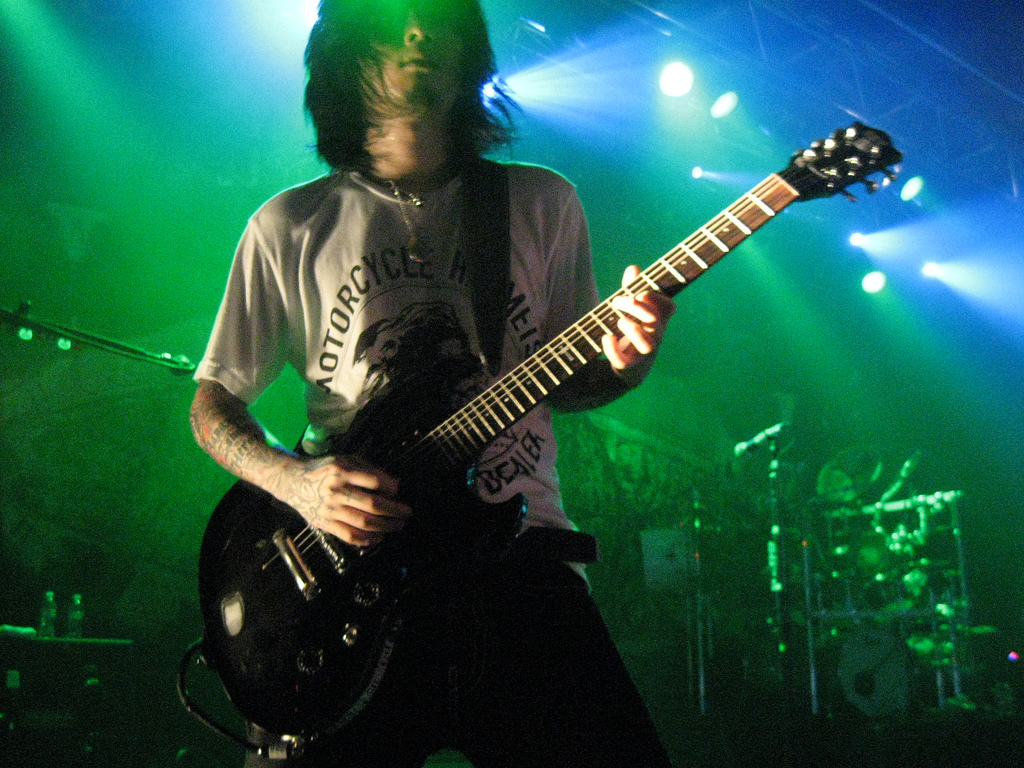
Kaoru

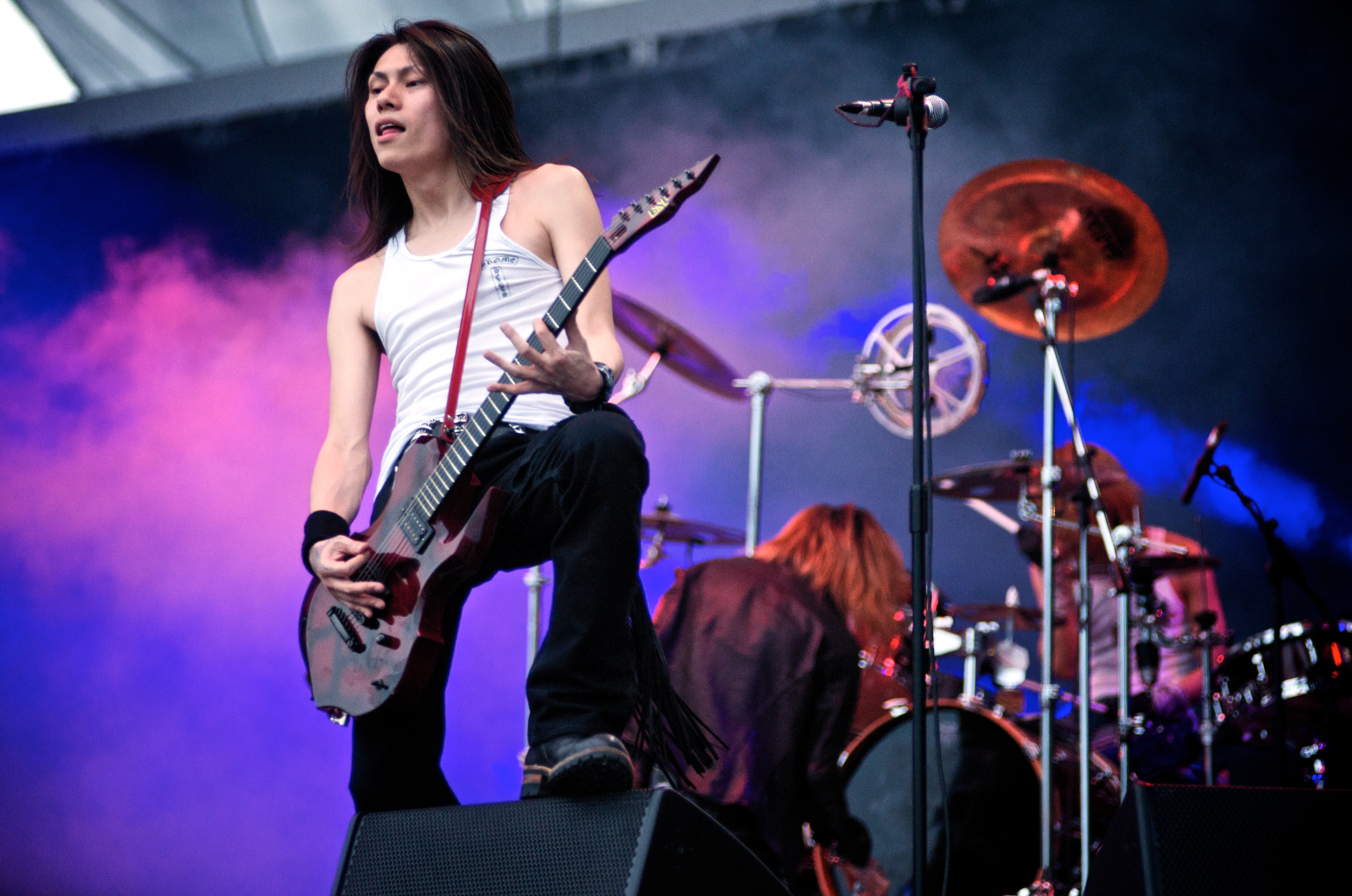
Die

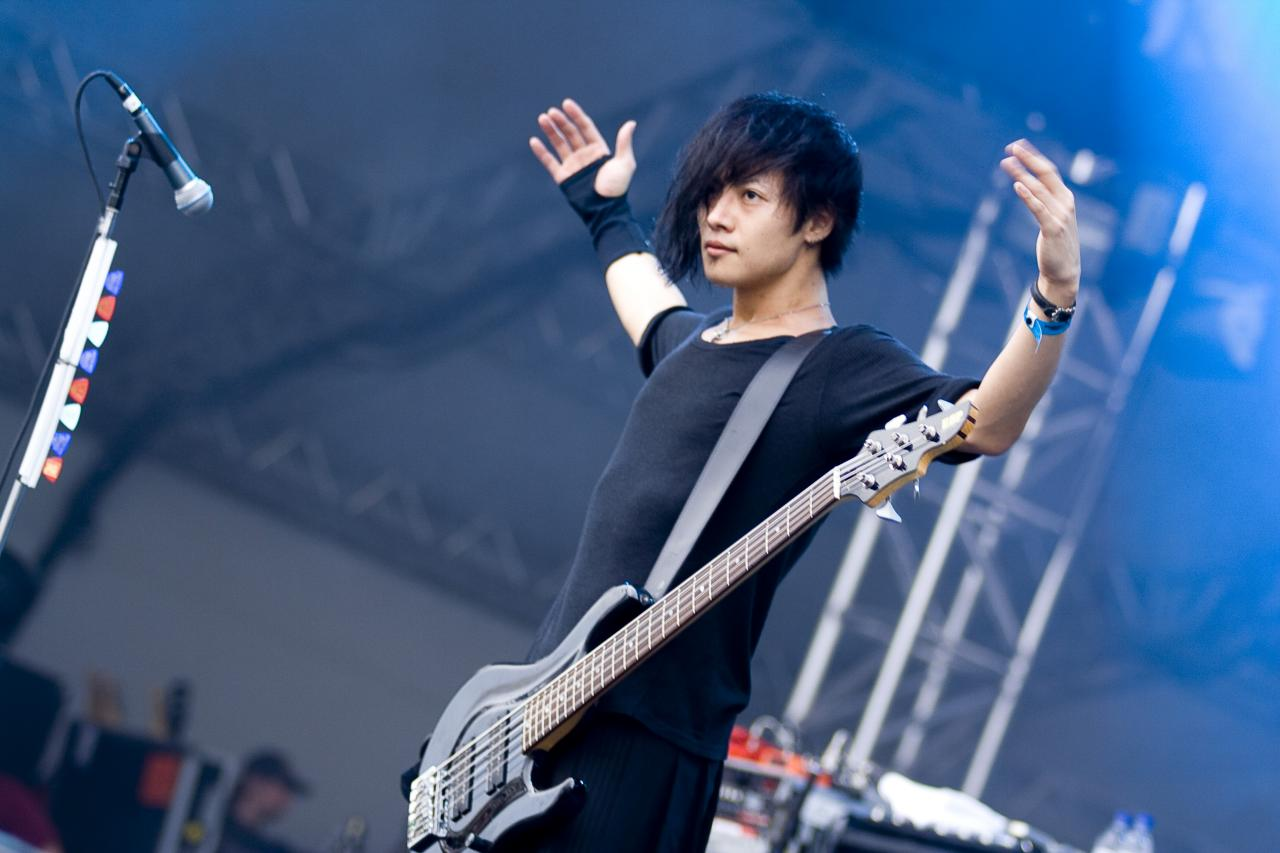
Toshiya

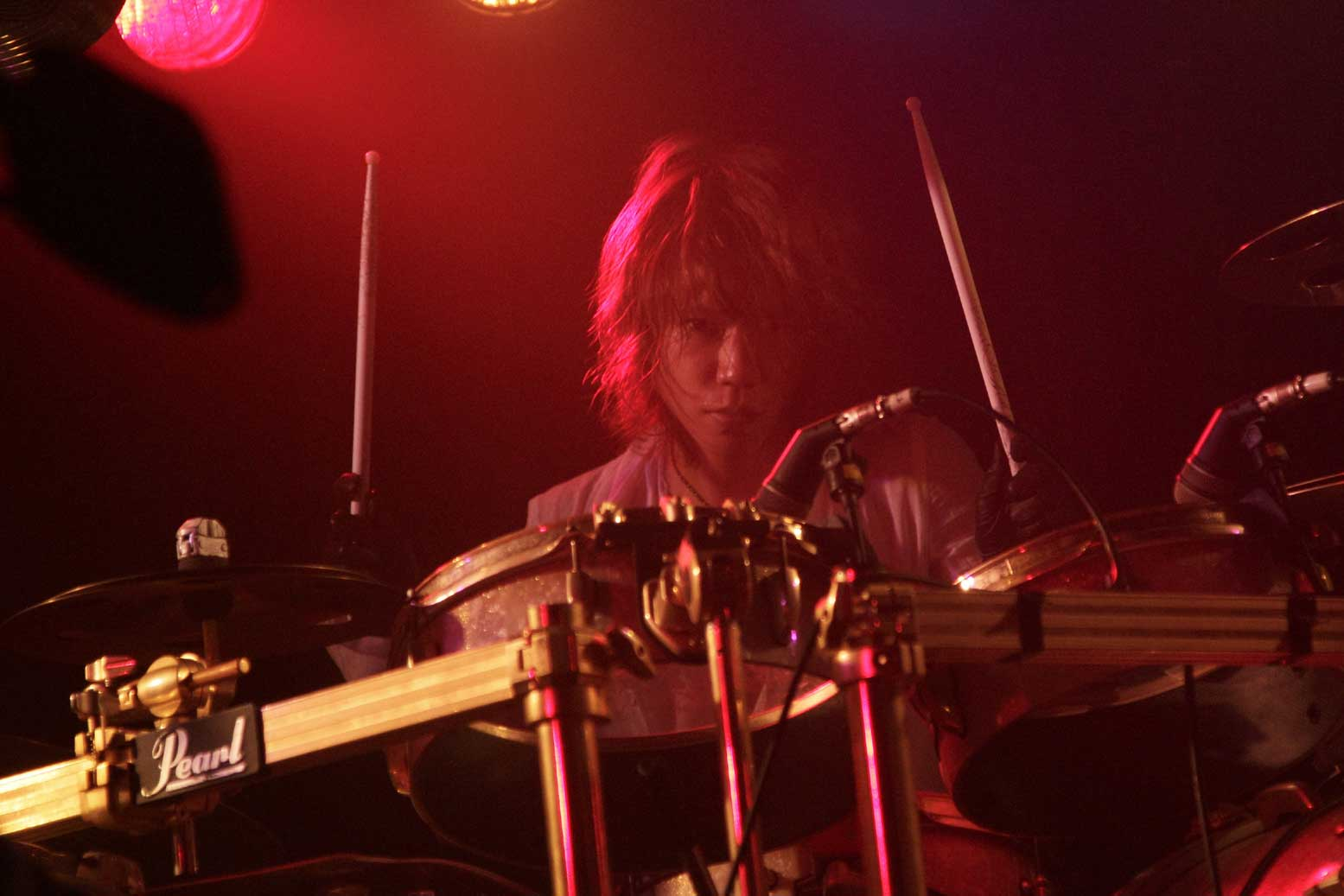
Shinya
- Kyo (京) – vocals, lyrics
- Kaoru (薫) – guitars
- Die – guitars
- Toshiya – bass
- Shinya – drums

== Discography ==
Studio albums

- Gauze (1999)
- Macabre (2000)
- Kisō (2002)
- Vulgar (2003)
- Withering to Death (2005)
- The Marrow of a Bone (2007)
- Uroboros (2008)
- Dum Spiro Spero (2011)
- Arche (2014)
- The Insulated World (2018)
- Phalaris (2022)
- Mortal Downer (2026)
