= Kyo (musician) =

Japanese musician

Kyo 京
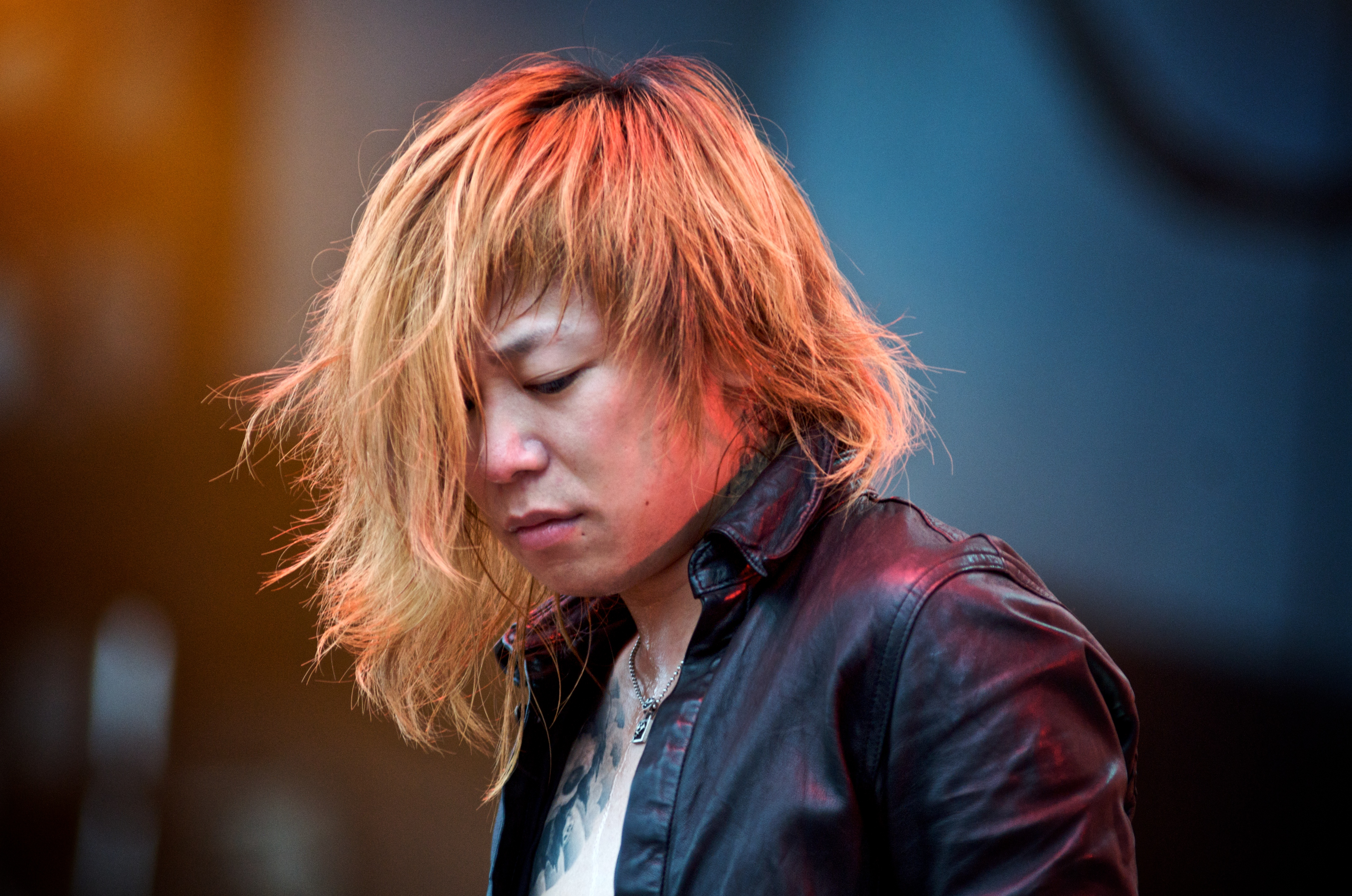
- Kyo at Maquinaria Festival in 2009

Background information
- Also known as: Yoma (殀磨)
- Born: February 16, 1976 (age 50); Kyoto, Japan
- Genres: Heavy metal; experimental; avant-garde; progressive
- Occupations: Musician; singer; lyricist; poet
- Instruments: Vocals; synthesizer
- Years active: 1993–present
- Member of: Dir En Grey; Sukekiyo; Petit Brabancon
- Website: kyo-official.jp

Kyo (Japanese: 京, Hepburn: Kyō; born February 16, 1976 in Kyoto) is a Japanese musician, singer, lyricist and poet. He is best known as the vocalist and lyricist of the heavy metal band Dir En Grey. He was formerly in a string of visual kei rock bands, with the most notable being La:Sadie's from 1996 to 1997. When they disbanded, he formed Dir En Grey in February 1997 with three of the other four members. Kyo formed the experimental rock band Sukekiyo in 2013, and the supergroup Petit Brabancon in 2021.

== Career ==
Kyo was inspired to become a musician when he saw a picture of Buck-Tick vocalist Atsushi Sakurai on the desk of a junior high school classmate. When he then discovered X Japan he was particularly fond of hide and had his parents buy him the guitarist's black signature model guitar. However, after realizing how difficult it was to play guitar and then bass, he then switched to vocals. He worked as a roadie for Kuroyume. Kyo was in a string of visual kei rock bands, with the most notable being La:Sadie's. It was formed when Kisaki, bassist of Stella Maria, a band that played opposite Kyo's group Masquerade, was impressed by Kyo to the point that he wanted to form a new band with the singer. Kisaki explained that he and Kyo went to a lot of concerts in order to carefully scout who they wanted to recruit. The two formed La:Sadie's together in 1996, with Kisaki later describing them as having been "the ideal band". However, despite having what he considered great live performances, the bassist was told to leave the group after only a year. Kisaki later opined that he had failed to take care of them, "I thought doing lots of good live shows would please the members, but I was wrong. By not giving them time to rest and deciding on recording schedules in between, I must have put a lot of stress and burden on them."

Kyo and the other three members of La:Sadie's then formed Dir En Grey in February 1997. While on a 2010 North American co-headline tour, Kyo performed with Apocalyptica, singing "Bring Them To Light" along with Tipe Johnson. Later that year, he recorded vocals for Daisuke to Kuro no Injatachi's debut album.

In 2013, Kyo gathered artists from various visual kei rock bands to form the supergroup Sukekiyo. The band opened the first show for Sugizo's tour Thrive to Realize, and performed the next day for the Countdown Japan 13/14 festival. Their first album, Immortalis, was released in 2014. The band has subsequently released an EP, Vitium, in 2015, and a second studio album, Adoratio, in 2017. Kyo provided lyrics and vocals for the song "Zessai" on Sugizo's 2017 album Oneness M.

Kyo formed another supergroup, Petit Brabancon, in 2021. It includes Yukihiro, Miya, antz (Tokyo Shoegazer), and Hirofumi Takamatsu (The Novembers).

== Artistry ==
=== Vocal abilities ===
With a tenor voice spanning just over five octaves, Kyo's vocals are considered a pivotal aspect of Dir En Grey's music. He has gained wide recognition for his large range and versatility, being able to "howl, croon, emote cleanly, scream, shriek, growl, bellow, and make nearly inhuman sounds." Loudwire wrote "Sporting incredibly low death metal gutturals, Kyo can also turn a complete 180 as one of metal's highest shriekers." Dane Prokofiev of PopMatters said that his "natural ease at and inclination towards striking such a stark contrast between the two opposite ends of the human vocal spectrum can be obtained as only a kind of pre-birth winning lottery ticket—you know, that much coveted prize we call 'talent'."

AllMusic's Thom Jurek has compared him favorably to experimental and avant-garde vocalists Mike Patton and Diamanda Galás. Kyo's own bandmate Die said "he's like a guitar or an effect. Kyo is an instrument. That inspires me. That allows me to grow as a guitarist as well."

=== Lyrics ===
While he has only composed a handful of Dir En Grey's songs (for example, "The Domestic Fucker Family" and "Hades"), Kyo is responsible for all the lyrics, which usually have negative implications and touch on a variety of dark, sometimes taboo, subjects, such as sexual obsessions ("Zomboid"), child abuse ("Berry"), and mass media ("Mr. Newsman"). A lot of his lyrics are also love poems. Several songs deal with specifically Japanese issues, such as the country's casual attitude towards abortion ("Mazohyst of Decadence" and "Obscure") and its conformity-oriented society ("Children"). Others deal with more traditional subject matter such as personal feelings, emotions, and lost love ("Undecided", "Taiyou no Ao", "Mushi").

When asked why most of the band's lyrics are in Japanese instead of English, which has more broad international appeal, Kaoru said that "We consider our music [to be] a piece of art. [...] The language is part of that artwork." He explained that Kyo prefers "the sensitivities that Japanese language offers. There are expressions and nuances that can only be conveyed in Japanese; he values that."

The vocabulary used ranges from vulgar to exalted, with wordplay and double entendres occurring frequently. For example, the title of the song "Mitsu to Tsuba", which is about rape, means "Honey and Saliva", but is written with the kanji inverted, suggesting reading them with an inverted pronunciation - "Tsumi to Batsu" - which would translate to "Crime and Punishment", a more appropriate title.

=== Stage image ===
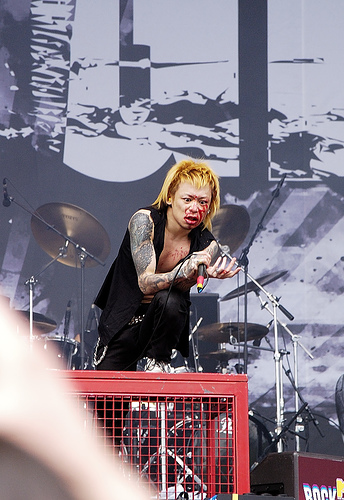
Kyo performing in 2006 with wounds on his chest and blood smeared on his face.

His stage performances became known in the mid-2000s for their shock elements such as full-body makeup resembling heavy burns, fake vomit of varying color and consistency, which developed into various acts of self-mutilation. There is video documentation from the mid-2000 involving the use of blades as well as evidence of strained mental health and fainting, although some of it was performative, and purported to be in place within a tour's usual set-list. Kyo would also regularly engage in fish-hooking during the performance of "Kodoku ni Shisu, Yueni Kodoku" throughout the "It Withers and Withers" and "Inward Scream" tours. However, after 2008's Uroboros, the occurrence of these incidents have subsided; while he still sometimes wears costumes on stage, he rarely performs self mutilation, real or simulated, his last recorded one being during the same song on Dir en Grey's Tour 16-17 From Depression to ______ [Mode of Withering to Death.].

== Health ==
Throughout his career, Kyo has sustained damage to his hearing and vocal cords multiple times. On September 9, 2000, he experienced sudden sensorineural hearing loss during the first show of a tour, causing its postponement to early 2001. In December 2000, acute acoustic trauma to his left ear resulted in another two postponed shows; Kyo has remained partially deaf in that ear ever since. In June 2002 and July 2006, a number of shows had to be postponed due to Kyo developing acute tonsillitis, and in April 2009 due to inflamed vocal cords and abnormal accumulation of fluid in his larynx. In February 2012, Kyo was diagnosed with vocal cord nodules and dysphonia, forcing Dir En Grey to pull out of the "Still Reckless" tour which was set to begin in March 2012. Although he was hospitalized and advised to undergo surgery, the issues were ultimately treated with medicine and rest. Right after a May 2013 show at Shinkiba Studio Coast, he was again hospitalized with tonsillitis. In September 2021, two shows of the "Desperate" tour had to be postponed due to Kyo being diagnosed with an acute bronchitis. On July 19, 2025, Kyo revealed that he has been diagnosed with Ménière's disease.

== Bibliography ==
Kyo has released two volumes of poetry, published through Media Factory. Both books are accompanied by short bonus CDs. In 2013, Kyo launched a new website and released two collections of photography, "Shikkaku", which features Kyo as the subject and "For the Human Race", which features photography by Kyo himself.

In July 2015, Kyo announced a new poetry collection book titled Gasou no Shi, which would be released on August as the first volume in a series.

Release	Title
August 31, 2001	Jigyaku, Rensō Furan Shinema (自虐、歛葬腐乱シネマ); Bonus CD: Daisanteikoku Gakudan (第三帝国楽団)
December 3, 2004	Zenryaku, Ogenki Desu ka, Saihate no Chi Yori Namonaki Kimi ni Ai wo Komete... (前略、お元気ですか、最果ての地より名も無き君に愛を込めて・・・); Bonus CD: Furan Shinema Teikoku Gakudan (腐乱シネマ帝國楽団)
June 2013	Shikkaku (失格)
June 2013	for the human race
August 2015	"Gasō no Shi" Jōkan (「我葬の詩」上巻)
April 2016	"Gasō no Shi" Gekan (「我葬の詩」下巻)
April 2017	Aun no Ari (阿吽の蟻)
June 2018	Shikkaku Ni (失格弐)
July 2018	The Zemeckises
April 2020	Aun no Ari Ni (阿吽の蟻 弐)
August 2021	Shikkaku San (失格参)
July 2023	Aun no Ari San (阿吽の蟻 参)
February 2025	Shikkaku Shi (失格肆)
