= Traces Vol.2 =

Greatest hits album by the Gazette
- Released: March 8, 2017
- Length: 60:10
- Language: Japanese
- Label: Sony Japan

The Gazette chronology
Dogma (2016)	Traces Vol.2 (2017)	Ninth (2018)

Traces Vol.2 is the second greatest hits album by the Japanese band The Gazette, released on March 8, 2017 on Sony Japan, in celebration of the band's 15-year career. Unlike the previous greatest hits album, Traces Best of 2005–2009, this time the band re-recorded the songs.

== Charts ==
The album peaked at the 8th position on the Oricon Albums Chart.

== Track listing ==
No.	Title	Original album	Length
1.	"Kare Uta" (枯詩)	Verwelktes Gedicht	5:10
2.	"Cassis"	NIL	6:54
3.	"D.L.N"	NIL	6:15
4.	"Calm Envy"	Stacked Rubbish	5:55
5.	"reila"	reila (single)	8:02
6.	"Untitled"	Toxic	4:22
7.	"Without a Trace"	Distress and Coma (single)	4:20
8.	"Guren" (紅蓮)	DIM	5:26
9.	"Shiroki Yuutsu" (白き憂鬱)	DIM	4:32
10.	"Pledge"	Toxic	6:05

Limited edition bonus tracks
No.	Title	Original album	Length
11.	"Ito" (絲)	Akuyuukai	6:43
12.	"Taion" (体温)	NIL	6:54
Total length:			60:10

== Personnel ==
- Ruki – vocals
- Uruha – lead guitar
- Aoi – rhythm guitar
- Reita – bass
- Kai – drums
