= Traces Best of 2005–2009 =

Greatest hits album by The Gazette
- Released: April 6, 2011
- Genre: Alternative metal, alternative rock, hard rock, progressive rock, funk rock
- Length: 59:25
- Label: PS Company / King Records

The Gazette chronology
Dim (2009)	Traces Best of 2005–2009 (2011)	Toxic (2011)

Singles from Traces Best of 2005–2009
- 1. "Before I Decay" Released: October 7, 2009; 2. "Reila" Released: March 9, 2005

Traces Best of 2005–2009 is the second compilation album by The Gazette, featuring songs from 2005 to 2009 like "Reila", "Cassis", "Shadow VI II I", "Regret", "Filth in the Beauty", "Hyena", "Burial Applicant", "Guren", "Leech", "Distress and Coma", "The Invisible Wall", and "Before I Decay". It peaked at the nineteenth position on the Oricon charts.

== Track listing ==
All lyrics are written by Ruki; all music is composed by The Gazette

No.	Title	Length
1.	"Reila"	7:49
2.	"Cassis"	6:44
3.	"Shadow VI II I"	4:16
4.	"Regret"	4:30
5.	"Filth in the Beauty"	4:11
6.	"Hyena"	4:16
7.	"Burial Applicant"	4:27
8.	"Guren" (紅蓮)	5:40
9.	"Leech"	5:40
10.	"Distress and Coma"	5:20
11.	"The Invisible Wall"	4:35
12.	"Before I Decay"	3:44
Total length:		59:25

== Notes ==
- This album was scheduled to be released on March 23, 2011, but the release was delayed two weeks due to the 2011 Tōhoku earthquake and tsunami.

== Personnel ==
- Ruki – vocals
- Uruha – lead guitar, backing vocals
- Aoi – rhythm guitar, backing vocals
- Reita – bass guitar, backing vocals
- Kai – drums, percussion
