= Mass (The Gazette album) =

Studio album by the GazettE
- Released: May 26, 2021
- Genre: Alternative metal
- Length: 41:47
- Language: Japanese, English
- Label: Sony Japan; JPU
- Producer: The GazettE

The GazettE chronology
Ninth (2018)	Mass (2021)

Mass (stylized as MASS in Japan) is the tenth studio album by Japanese visual kei rock band the GazettE, which saw release on May 26, 2021, in the US and Japan by Sony Music Records and in the UK, Europe and Russia by JPU Records. Before the album was released, the single "Blinding Hope" was released on March 10, 2021. It became the last album to feature Reita as bassist after his death in 2024.

"Blinding Hope" reached the top on iTunes UK Metal Songs chart and the top ten on Amazon Hard Rock and Metal Songs chart in several countries. As of July 6, 2021, the official music video of "Blinding Hope" accumulated 1.7 million views on YouTube.

Mass reached fourth position on Oricon Albums Chart and fifth on Billboard Japan Hot 100. On Billboard Japan Top Download Albums, Mass reached the top. It was also number one on iTunes charts in Brazil, Chile, Hong Kong, Singapore, Taiwan, Thailand, Finland and Malaysia.

== Overview ==
After the release of the promotional single "Blinding Hope" on the GazettE's official YouTube channel, Mass was announced as the group's first album in three years. The band faced some inactivity after their 18-year concert was canceled due to the COVID-19 pandemic. Mass was released in celebration of their 19-year career, which began in April 2002 with the release of "Wakaremichi". The extended, promotional version of the album cover appears to pay tribute to the GazettE's previous albums with adapted illustrations from them, such as the cube on DIM's cover.

About a month before the release, the band announced an online event featuring an autograph session and chat with the members. Due to limited spaces, those interested in participating would have to register with the numbered ticket present in each copy of the album and the winners would be chosen by drawing lots.

In addition to "Blinding Hope", two songs debuted on the Japanese radio before the album's release: "Nox", on May 14 on Beat Shuffle and "Last Song", on May 17 on Evening Tap. The band broadcast three live shows on YouTube, on May 24, 25 and 26.

== Recording and production ==
The Gazette started working on the album in mid-late 2019. Since the lockdown due to the pandemic, each member started writing alone at home. Mass was the GazettE's first album entirely recorded online, with also producing and mixing done at home. All songs were written by vocalist Ruki.

Unlike previous albums like Dogma, but like Ninth, Mass does not have a clearly defined concept, as stated by the group. However, Ruki said Mass presents the band's evolution: "We completed this album with the intention of creating something that could truly be called the GazettE." For the first time, guitarist Aoi played with a 7-string guitar. Bassist Reita played only "Daku" and "Moment" with his fingers, and in the other songs he used a pick. He also improved his instruments, but went back to using amplifiers that he used before.

== Release ==
Mass was released worldwide on May 26, 2021, by Sony Music Records on USA and Japan and by UK, Europe and Russia by JPU Records. Four editions have been released: the regular, only with the 11-track CD, the limited edition that accompanies the music video and making-of of "Blinding Hope", and the limited editions BOX A on Blu-ray and BOX B on DVD, which include a bonus booklet. The international version of JPU Records is also different, accompanying in the booklet transliterations of the lyrics in romaji and their respective translations into English.

== Track listing ==
Mass track listing
No.	Title	Length
1.	"Count-10"	1:14
2.	"Blinding Hope"	4:22
3.	"Rollin'"	3:28
4.	"Nox"	3:33
5.	"Hold"	2:58
6.	"Daku" (濁)	4:40
7.	"The Pale"	5:00
8.	"Moment"	4:22
9.	"Barbarian"	3:51
10.	"Frenzy"	2:43
11.	"Last Song"	5:36
Total length:		41:47

== Personnel ==
- Ruki – lead vocals
- Uruha – guitars, backing vocals
- Aoi – guitars, backing vocals
- Reita – bass, backing vocals
- Kai – drums, percussion
