= Reila (song) =

- Reila [Lesson.D] cover

Single by The Gazette
- B-side: "Shunsetsu no Koro" (春雪の頃)
- Released: March 9, 2005; November 23, 2005 (Re-release)
- Genre: Rock/metal
- Label: PS Company

The Gazette singles chronology
"Miseinen" (2005)	"Reila" (2005)	"Cassis" (2005)

"Reila" (stylized as reila) is the seventh maxi-single by The Gazette, released on March 9, 2005. It was released by PS Company in 3 types.

The song was not included on any studio album, but appeared on the 2011 compilation album Traces Best of 2005-2009 and was re-recorded for 2017's Traces Vol.2. The music video was included in the 2006 clip compilation Film Bug I.

In a survey among readers of the website JRock News, "Reila" was the second most voted song as the best by The Gazette.

== Release ==
In December 2004, the new single "Reila" was announced, along with the announcement of the third act of Royal Disorder tour series. It was released on March 9, 2005 in three editions: "[Reila] Lesson G", "[Reila] Lesson O" and "[Reila] Lesson D". The first two were limited to ten thousand copies and come with a separate bonus track, while the third contains only the main track and the B-side, "Shunsetsu no Koro (春雪の頃)". On November 23, 2005, "[Reila] Lesson D" was re-released, this time accompanying an extra CD with a music video for the title track.

== Musical style ==
Music magazine CD Journal related that the single is a complete change from the band's previous "aggressive" songs, with "Reila" being a "ballad emphasizing the acoustic guitar sound."

Both track's lyrics were written by vocalist Ruki and "Shunsetsu no Koro" (春雪の頃) was composed by guitarist Uruha.

== Commercial performance ==
"Reila" peaked at number 8 on Oricon Singles Chart and stayed on chart for seven weeks. It was the first release of the band to reach Oricon top 10. It sold 38,823 copies while on the chart.

== Track listing ==
=== Single ===
Lesson. G

1. "reila" - 7:49
2. "Shunsetsu no koro" (春雪の頃; The Day of Blue Graduation) - 5:46
3. "Akai kodou" (赫い鼓動; Red Pulsation) - 4:54

Lesson. O

1. "reila" - 7:49
2. "Shunsetsu no Koro" (春雪の頃; The Day of Blue Graduation) - 5:46
3. "Uzuku aza to igamu ura"(疼く痣と歪む裏; Aching Back Bruise and Strained) - 4:17

Lesson. D

1. "reila" - 7:49
2. "Shunsetsu no Koro" (春雪の頃; The Day of Blue Graduation) - 5:46

=== EP version ===
1. "reila" - 7:49
2. "Shunsetsu no Koro" (春雪の頃; The Day of Blue Graduation) - 5:46
3. "Uzuku aza to igamu ura"(疼く痣と歪む裏; Aching Back Bruise and Strained) - 4:17
4. "Akai kodou" (赫い鼓動; Red Pulsation) - 4:54

== Personnel ==
- Ruki – vocals
- Reita – bass
- Aoi – rhythm guitar
- Uruha – lead guitar
- Kai – drums

== Notes ==
- If placed next to each other, the names of the different types form the word GOD.
