= Ugly (The Gazette song) =

Single by The Gazette
- Language: Japanese
- Released: November 18, 2015
- Genre: Metalcore
- Length: 3:30
- Label: Sony Music Records

The Gazette singles chronology
"Fadeless" (2013)	"Ugly" (2015)	"Undying" (2016)

"Ugly" (stylized as UGLY) is the twenty-second single by Japanese rock band The Gazette, released on November 18, 2015, in two editions. It is the third movement of the band's project Dark Age and was not included on any album, despite being strongly related to Dogma. In Japan, it was released by Sony Japan and by JPU Records in Europe.

== Release ==
"Ugly" was announced in late October 2015. At the same time, a teaser and the band's new visual were presented. On November 2, the title track began airing on Japanese radio stations. A week before the release, JPU Records started the pre-sale via iTunes. In November 15, The Gazette revealed a teaser for each of the single's three tracks.

"Ugly" was released on November 18 in two editions: regular, which only has the CD with three tracks, and limited, where the CD has just two tracks but comes with a DVD, with the music video of "Ugly" and its making-of.

In a survey among readers of JRock News website, the song came in ninth place as the best by The Gazette.

== Composition and themes ==
In an interview with Barks, vocalist Ruki said that after the release of Dogma, the band decided to release a new single. Even though they didn't have a song selected yet, he knew what the music video would be like and the production started with the video.

"Ugly" is the third movement of the band's project Dark Age, and its cover complements the cover of other movements Dogma and "Undying". According to Ruki, the cover of "Ugly" represents "sacrifice" and the song's theme is "hate". The cover was created by illustrator Tobias Kwan and the song was mastered by Ted Jensen.

== Track listing ==
Limited edition

CD
No.	Title	Length
1.	"Ugly"	3:30
2.	"Depravity"	3:17

DVD
No.	Title	Length
1.	"Ugly" (Music video)
2.	"Ugly" (Making-of)

Regular edition

CD
No.	Title	Length
1.	"Ugly"	3:30
2.	"Depravity"	3:17
3.	"Goddess"	3:44
Total length:		10:33

== Personnel ==
- Ruki – vocals
- Reita – bass
- Aoi – rhythm guitar
- Uruha – lead guitar
- Kai – drums

== Charts ==
Chart performance for Ugly
Chart (2015)	Peak position
Oricon Singles Chart	16
Billboard Japan Hot 100	38
