= Division (The Gazette album) =

Studio album by the GazettE
- Released: August 29, 2012
- Genres: Industrial metal; alternative metal; nu metal
- Length: 48:14 (limited edition); 45:18 (regular edition)
- Languages: Japanese, English
- Label: Sony Japan

The GazettE chronology
Toxic (2011)	Division (2012)	Beautiful Deformity (2013)

Division is the sixth studio album by Japanese visual kei rock band the GazettE, released on August 29, 2012, in Japan by Sony Music Records, and released on October 1, 2012, in Europe by JPU Records as the label's first release. It is a double album, the first disk containing alternative metal and nu metal songs and the second disk containing industrial metal songs in the limited edition, including 14 songs, the first CD has mostly Japanese titled tracks, while the second CD has only English titled tracks, and a DVD with the promotional videos "Ibitsu" and "Derangement" each disc (including the DVD) has their own name. The regular edition includes 12 songs. Is the first release that does not include promotional singles since their sixth EP Gama.

A Japanese tour, called Live Tour12 -Division- Groan of Diplosomia 01, to promote the album, began on October 8, 2012, at the Yokosuka Arts Theatre and finished on November 29, 2012, at the NHK Hall with a total of 24 performances.

The second part of the tour called Live Tour13 -Division- Groan of Diplosomia 02 with a total of 6 performances began on February 2, 2013, and finished in the final concert Melt on Saitama Super Arena. A DVD was released with recorded live footage of the Melt concert on June 26, 2013.

The album scored number 3 on the Oricon Daily Charts and number 4 on the Oricon Weekly Charts, selling 23,051 copies in its first week.

== Track listing ==
=== Limited Edition ===
All lyrics are written by Ruki.

Disc 1: Fragment [Vein]
No.	Title	Music	Length
1.	"[Depth]"	the GazettE	1:13
2.	"Ibitsu (歪; Distortion)"	the GazettE	3:59
3.	"Kago no Sanagi (籠の蛹; Caged Chrysalis)"	Kai	4:38
4.	"Hedoro (ヘドロ; Sludge)"	Uruha	3:32
5.	"Kagefumi (影踏み; Treading on Shadows)"	Uruha	4:21
6.	"Yoin (余韻; Afterglow)"	Aoi	3:28
7.	"[Diplosomia]"	the GazettE	1:43

Disc 2: Fragment [Artery]
No.	Title	Music	Length
1.	"[XI]"	the GazettE	1:45
2.	"Derangement"	the GazettE	4:42
3.	"Required Malfunction"	the GazettE	4:07
4.	"Dripping Insanity"	the GazettE	4:07
5.	"Attitude"	the GazettE	3:29
6.	"Gabriel on the Gallows"	Uruha	4:03
7.	"[Melt]"	Uruha	3:07

Disc 3: Binding Site
No.	Title	Length
1.	"Ibitsu (歪; Distortion, PV)"
2.	"[Diplosomia] (PV)"
3.	"DERANGEMENT (PV)"

=== Regular Edition ===
No.	Title	Music	Length
1.	"[XI]"	the GazettE	1:45
2.	"Gabriel on the Gallows"	Uruha	4:03
3.	"Derangement"	the GazettE	4:42
4.	"Dripping Insanity"	the GazettE	4:07
5.	"Yoin (余韻; Afterglow)"	Aoi	3:28
6.	"Ibitsu (歪; Distortion)"	the GazettE	3:59
7.	"Kagefumi (影踏み; Treading on Shadows)"	Uruha	4:21
8.	"Kago no Sanagi (籠の蛹; Caged Chrysalis)"	Kai	4:38
9.	"Hedoro (ヘドロ; Sludge)"	Uruha	3:32
10.	"Attitude"	the GazettE	3:29
11.	"Required Malfunction"	the GazettE	4:07
12.	"[Melt]"	Uruha	3:07
