= Undying =

Undying can refer to:

== Film ==
- The Undying Monster, a 1942 American horror film
- The Undying (film), a 2011 American romantic thriller film

== Games ==
- Clive Barker's Undying, a 2001 first-person shooter game
- Undying (video game), a 2023 survival game

== Literature ==
- The House of the Undying in A Song of Ice and Fire, epic fantasy series by George R.R. Martin
- The Undying: Pain, Vulnerability, Mortality, Medicine, Art, Time, Dreams, Data, Exhaustion, Cancer, and Care, a 2019 non-fiction book by Anne Boyer
- The Undying in the 1979 fantasy novel The Spellcoats by Diana Wynne Jones

== Music ==
- Colton Grundy: The Undying, 2004 studio album by Blaze Ya Dead Homie
- Undying (song), a 2016 single by The Gazette
