= Disorder (album) =

Studio album by the Gazette
- Released: October 8, 2004
- Recorded: Studio Moopies
- Length: 47:52
- Labels: PS Company, CLJ Records
- Producers: Gazette; Tomomi Ozaki; Koji Shimana

The Gazette chronology
Madara (2004)	Disorder (2004)	Gama (2005)

Singles from Zakurogata no Yūutsu
- 1. "Zakurogata no Yūutsu" Released: July 28, 2004

Disorder (stylized as DISORDER) is the debut album by Japanese rock band the Gazette, released on October 13, 2004 by PS Company, including the single "Zakurogata no Yūutsu" (ザクロ型の憂鬱). The first printing, called Premium Gazerock, was limited. The regular edition went on sale after the limited edition was sold out. It was re-released on May 3, 2006 and January 1, 2010.

== Musical style ==
Japanese music website Jame World commented that Disorder is "a mish-mash of genres, sounds, and styles all brought together," living up to its name. It also said that the album is "earth-shatteringly loud, aggressive, and can feel borderline psychotic at times."

== Commercial performance ==
Disorder reached number 19 on Oricon Albums Chart and remained on the chart for nine weeks. John D. Buchanan of Allmusic stated that this is a relatively high ranking for an independent band's debut album. Sold 14,883 copies while it was on the chart. "Zakurogata no Yūutsu" reached number 23 on Oricon Singles Chart.

== Track listing ==
All music by The Gazette. All lyrics by Ruki.

1. "Intro" - 0:48
2. "THE $OCIAL RIOT MACHINE$" - 3:36
3. "Carry?" - 4:29
4. "Zakuro-gata no Yūutsu" (ザクロ型の憂鬱; Pomegranate Type Depression) - 3:56
5. "Maximum Impulse" - 5:39
6. "Hanakotoba" (花言葉; Flower Language) - 4:46
7. "Tōkyō Shinjū" (東京心中; Tokyo Love) - 5:48
8. "SxDxR" - 3:22
9. "Anti Pop" - 3:14
10. "Shichigatsu Yōka" (7月8日; July 8th) - 4:38
11. "Saraba" (さらば; Farewell) - 6:15
12. "Disorder Heaven" - 1:21

== Personnel ==
- Ruki – vocals
- Uruha – guitar
- Aoi – guitar
- Reita – bass
- Kai – drums
