= The Gazette (band) =

Japanese band

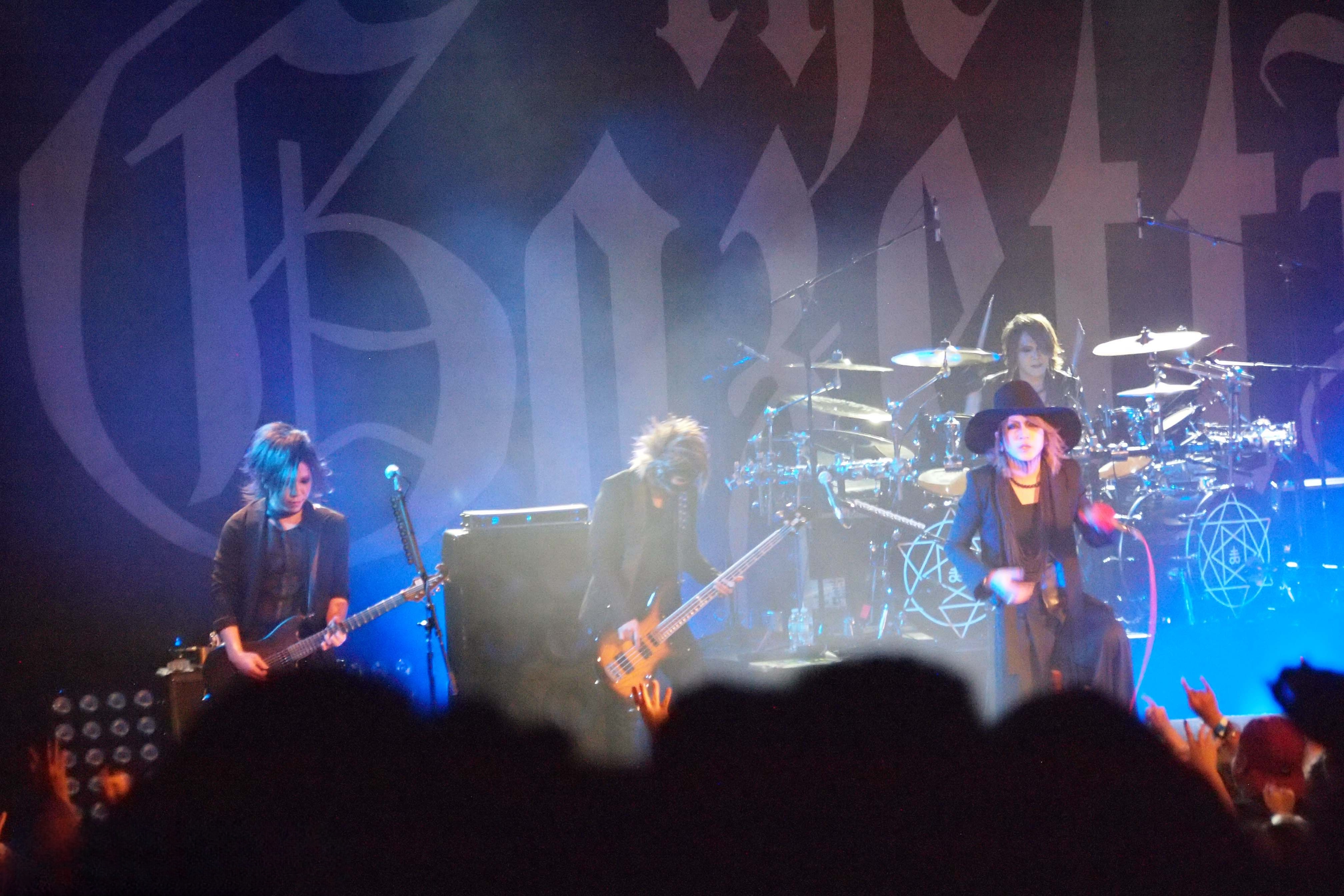
- The Gazette performing in 2016

Background information
- Also known as: Gazette (ガゼット)
- Origin: Kanagawa, Japan
- Genres: Alternative metal; hard rock; nu metal; industrial metal; metalcore; punk rock
- Years active: 2002–present
- Labels: Matina; King; PS Company; CLJ; Sony Music; JPU; Youkai
- Members: Ruki; Uruha; Kai
- Past members: Yune; Aoi; Reita
- Website: the-gazette.com

The Gazette (stylized as the GazettE), formerly known as Gazette (Japanese: ガゼット, Hepburn: Gazetto), is a Japanese visual kei rock band, formed in Kanagawa in early 2002. The band is currently signed to Sony Music Records.

== Biography ==
=== 2002: Conception and early work ===
The band began in 2002 with Ruki (vocals), Reita (bass) and Uruha (lead guitar) in Kanagawa Prefecture. After being involved with other bands in the visual kei movement, the trio decided that this band would be their last. They recruited Aoi (rhythm guitar) and Yune (drums) from disbanded visual band Artia and formally became Gazette in January 2002. The band name is an intentional misspelling of "cassette" (カセット, kasetto).

After signing to the Matina record label, they released their first single, "Wakaremichi", and first music video on April 30, 2002. "Wakaremichi" was re-released in June. By September, they had released "Kichiku Kyoushi (32sai Dokushin) no Nousatsu Kouza" and their second PV. In October 2002, they played their first solo live show, and on Christmas 2002, the 5-song compilation Yougenkyou with the song "Okuribi" was released.

=== 2003–2004: New drummer, Cockayne Soup and Disorder ===
In early 2003, drummer Yune left the band and was replaced by Kai (from visual band Mareydi†Creia) who volunteered to be the leader of the band. Shortly after this, Gazette signed with the PS Company label and in May, released their first EP, Cockayne Soup. They started their first tour with the band Hanamuke, during which the two bands collaborated on two songs.

A second tour followed with the band Vidoll. The bands were featured together on the November issue of Cure, a magazine focusing on visual kei bands.

In early December 2003, they played a co-headlining show with Deadman. On December 28, they performed at Fool's Mate magazine's Beauti-fool's Fest. The performance was later released on DVD.

On January 16, 2004, the band recorded a solo performance at the Shibuya-AX, released on DVD as Tokyo Saihan -Judgment Day-. On March 30, 2004, they released their fifth EP Madara, which reached No. 2 on the Oricon Indie Charts. Madara was followed on May 26 by a companion DVD that included six music videos and an in-the-studio documentary. In the same month, Gazette was featured in Shoxx magazine's Expect Rush III, a catalogue of independent visual kei artists.

A second concert DVD, Heisei Banka, was released on August 25, 2004. In September and October, they toured with fellow PS Company bands Kra and Bis. Their first studio album, Disorder, was released on October 13, 2004, and subsequently made it to the top 5 of the indies Oricon Daily Charts.

=== 2005–2006: Nil and Nameless Liberty Six Guns tour ===
In early 2005, Gazette embarked on their Japan-wide spring tour called Standing Tour 2005 Maximum Royal Disorder. The final performance of the tour was held at Shibuya Kokaido on April 17, 2005. On March 9, they released the new single "Reila".

After the DVD release of their concert on July 6, 2005, the band released their sixth EP, Gama, and embarked on the Standing Tour 2005 (Gama) the Underground Red Cockroach. On October 20, Gazette released their first photobook, Verwelktes Gedicht, which included an exclusive CD containing the song "Kare Uta" (枯詩; 'Withered Poem'). On December 7, 2005, the band released their first single under a major label, "Cassis". The promotional video of "Cassis", was shot in Austria. On December 11, 2005, Gazette performed alongside other bands signed to the PS Company label to celebrate the record label's fifth anniversary Peace and Smile Carnival 2005 Tour.

The Gazette's logo

After changing the spelling of their name from Japanese to English and adding the word "the" in front of it, the band released their second studio album, Nil, on February 8, 2006. Shortly after, the Gazette embarked on another Japanese tour called Standing Tour 2006 Nameless Liberty Six Guns. The final performance of the tour was held at Nippon Budokan. In May 2006, they released their first compilation album, Dainihon Itangeishateki Noumiso Gyaku Kaiten Zekkyou Ongenshuu, which included songs that had been released from 2002 through 2004. In the next month, they released their second music video compilation DVD, Film Bug I. On July 29, 2006, the Gazette performed at the Beethovenhalle in Bonn, Germany, their first show outside of Asia. The concerts were arranged in conjunction with the AnimagiC anime and manga convention.

On August 6, 2006, the Gazette held a festival called Gazerock Festival in Summer 06 (Burst into a Blaze) at Tokyo Big Sight West Hall. Later that month, the band released two new singles, "Regret" on October 25, and "Filth in the Beauty" on November 1. To promote the singles, they began another tour, Tour 2006-2007 Decomposition Beauty. In the middle of tour, they announced that the final of the tour would be held at Yokohama Arena.

=== 2007–2009: Stacked Rubbish and Dim ===
In early 2007, the single "Hyena" was released. "Chizuru", its B-side, was used as the ending song of the Korean horror film, Apt.. The band's third studio album, Stacked Rubbish followed on July 4, 2007. The album reached No. 2 on the Oricon charts within a day of the release. The album was followed by a long promotional tour called Tour 2007–2008 Stacked Rubbish (Pulse Wriggling to Black) that went from July 2007 until April 2008. In the midst of the tour in October, the Gazette embarked on their first European tour, performing in England, Finland, France, and Germany. The tour finale was held in Yoyogi National Gymnasium on April 19 and April 20, 2008.

In the beginning of 2008, the Gazette collaborated with GemCerey on jewellery. They released the single, "Guren" on February 13, 2008, which reached No. 3 on the Oricon charts. The DVD for their Stacked Rubbish Grand Finale (Repeated Countless Error) at Yoyogi National Gymnasium was released on August 6, 2008. The single "Leech", released on November 12, 2008, landed a No. 2 spot on the Oricon charts. On July 14, 2008, the band performed in the event Music Japan 2008 (a TV program on NHK) with other bands such as Alice Nine, Plastic Tree, LM.C and Mucc.

On August 23, 2008, the Gazette held a festival called Gazerock Festival in Summer 08 (Burst into a Blaze) at Fuji-Q Conifer Forest. They then went on a fanclub tour throughout October called Standing Live Tour 08 (From the Distorted City), referencing the song "Distorted Daytime" from their "Leech" single, which portrayed Tokyo as a "distorted city", in terms of the societal and political crises sweeping over Japan.

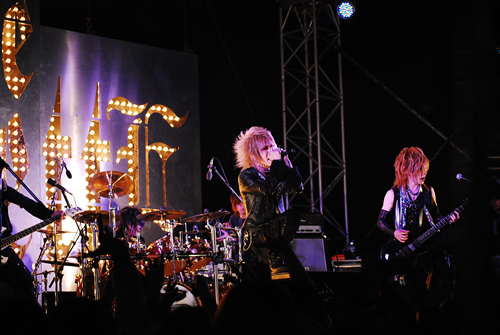
The Gazette in Tokyo, 2009

On November 15, 2008, the Gazette held a secret show at Shinjuku Station. Over seven thousand people showed up, marking a record at the venue. However, the police deemed it too dangerous to continue and shut the event down after only ten minutes and two songs.

On January 3, 2009, the Gazette performed at Nippon Budokan alongside fellow PS Company bands in the Peace and Smile Carnival 2009 Tour to celebrate the record label's 10th anniversary, where they announced they would release a single titled "Distress and Coma" on March 25. The release was preceded by a 7th anniversary performance called Live 09 (7-Seven-) at Makuhari Messe. The band released their fourth studio album, Dim on July 15, 2009, followed by another Japan-wide summer tour starting in July, for which the tour's final performance was held at Saitama Super Arena on September 5, 2009. On October 7, 2009, the single "Before I Decay" was released. After that, the Gazette performed at V Rock Festival 2009 at Makuhari Messe on October 24.

In December, the Gazette held a Christmas Eve live performance to close out the year called Live 09 (A Hymn of the Crucifixion) at Tokyo Big Sight.

=== 2010–2011: Label change and Toxic ===
On March 17, 2010, the band began the Standing Live Tour 10 (The End of Stillness) at Zepp Tokyo. After the fan club tour, the band then announced a live tour, which was called Tour 10 Nameless Liberty Six Bullets starting in July with two consecutive nights at Nippon Budokan. Among all of these events, the band also announced that they would be transferring from King Records to Sony Music Records. "Shiver" was the first single released by the Gazette under the new label. It was also selected as the opening theme song to the second season of the Sony anime series Black Butler. On August 4, 2010, they released their third music video on DVD titled Film Bug II, which included ten PV's from "Regret" to "Before I Decay".

Right after the release of "Shiver", the band announced that the final stop of the Tour 10 Nameless Liberty Six Bullets would be held at Tokyo Dome, and that two new singles, "Red" and "Pledge", would be released.

In March 2011, the band embarked on a fan club-only tour called Live Tour 11 (Two Concept Eight Nights -Abyss/Lucy-) and 9th Birth (Day 9 -Nine-) at Zepp Tokyo on March 10, 2011. The Gazette postponed the releases of their best-of album Traces Best of 2005–2009 and the live DVD The Nameless Liberty at 10.12.26 Tokyo Dome, which contains footage of the Tokyo Dome show, due to the 2011 Tōhoku earthquake and tsunami. Both were later released on April 6, 2011.

The single "Vortex" was released on May 25, 2011. In July 2011, Ruki and Aoi joined in on PS Carnival Tour 2011 Summer 7 Days at Shibuya. Ruki was in a session band named "Lu/V" and Aoi was in a session band named "Aoi with Bon:cra-z". The Gazette also performed at the 2011 Summer Sonic Festival that was held on August 13–14, 2011 in Tokyo and Osaka. On September 18, 2011, the Gazette performed at the Inazuma Rock Festival 2011 with TM Revolution.

The Gazette announced the release of their single "Remember the Urge" on August 31, as well as the release of the album Toxic on October 5 and the Live Tour11 Venomous Cell. The tour started on October 10, 2011, at Tokyo International Forum Hall A and led the band through 27 cities with a total of 28 performances held through the end of 2011. The tour finale was held in Yokohama Arena with the title Tour11-12 Venomous Cell -the Finale- Omega on January 14, 2012. On October 3, the Gazette was rewarded "The Most Requested Artist 2010" from the 2011 J-Melo Awards.

=== 2012: Division and Groan of Diplosomia tour ===
In the final concert of the Venomous Cell tour, the Gazette announced that they would hold a 10th anniversary concert called Standing Live 2012 10th Anniversary -The Decade- at Makuhari Messe on March 10, 2012. They also announced the release of a new album called Division. The album was released on August 29, 2012, in Japan and on October 1, 2012, in the UK and Europe, via JPU Records. Division was promoted during the nationwide tour Live Tour12 -Division- Groan of Diplosomia 01, which began on October 8, 2012, and came to a close on November 29, 2012.

Before the tour, the band also embarked on a fan club-only tour, titled Standing Live Tour12 -Heresy Presents- Heterodoxy. The tour started on July 4, 2012, and ended on August 29, 2012.

The Gazette performed at A-Nation Musicweek 2012 at Yoyogi National Stadium on August 4, 2012. They also played at Kishidan's Kishidan Banpaku 2012, on September 16 and 17 in Chiba. On October 11, 2012, the Gazette performed at the Rising Sun Rock Festival in Ezo.

The Gazette released a live DVD, 10th Anniversary: The Decade, on January 9, 2013. It contains the full footage from the band's 10th anniversary live show, the Decade, which took place on March 10, 2012, at Makuhari Messe. The band also announced their first tour for 2013, Live Tour13 Division Groan of Diplosomia 02, which started on February 2, 2013, at Sapporo Shimin Hall and ended March 10, 2013, with their anniversary concert the Gazette Live Tour12-13 Division Groan of Diplosomia Melt, which was held at Saitama Super Arena.

The Gazette performed at the Russian rock festival Kubana, which was held for the fifth time in Anapa at the Black Sea. It was their first time performing in the country and the first time they went overseas since their European Tour in 2007. On February 24, 2013, the Gazette won "The Most Requested Artist 2012" from the J-Melo Awards for a second time.

=== 2013–2014: Beautiful Deformity and Magnificent Malformed Box tour ===
After the final concert of their 11th anniversary celebrations, the Gazette announced their plans for 2013. Firstly, they released a DVD featuring footage from the aforementioned performance. Titled Live Tour12-13 Division Final Melt, the DVD came out on June 26, 2013. The band also released a single, titled "Fadeless", in August and an album, titled Beautiful Deformity, on October 23. The Gazette also announced a tour to promote these releases, The Gazette Live Tour13 Beautiful Deformity Magnificent Malformed Box, which started on November 2 and finished on December 28.

As part of their world tour in September 2013, the Gazette returned to Europe for concerts; performing two shows in France, two in Germany and one in Finland. The band also went to four Latin American countries that month: Mexico, Chile, Argentina and Brazil.

During 2014, the Gazette held a trilogy of tours entitled Redefinition dedicated to their past albums and limited to fan club members only. In March 2014, they held concerts showcasing Disorder and Nil, July saw a second tour for Stacked Rubbish and Dim, and a final tour in November entitled Groan of Venomous Cell hosted songs from Toxic and Division. This tour began on the day of the band's 12th anniversary, and was dedicated to the work they achieved together over the last decade. During the first show of Groan of Venomous Cell, Ruki announced that all three Redefinition tours were to be published in a DVD box set entitled Standing Live Tour 14 Heresy Limited -Saiteigi- Complete Box, which wase released on March 11, 2015.

On December 24, 2014, Sony released Film Bug III, featuring the Gazette's music video for "To Dazzling Darkness".

=== 2015–2016: 13th Anniversary and Project: Dark Age ===
On March 10, 2015, the Gazette held their 13th anniversary at Nippon Budokan. They also opened a special exhibition divided on panels in which they displayed members' instrument models, showed the band's history and placed a message board where fans could write messages to the band. The exhibition was open to everyone, even those who did not attend the concert.

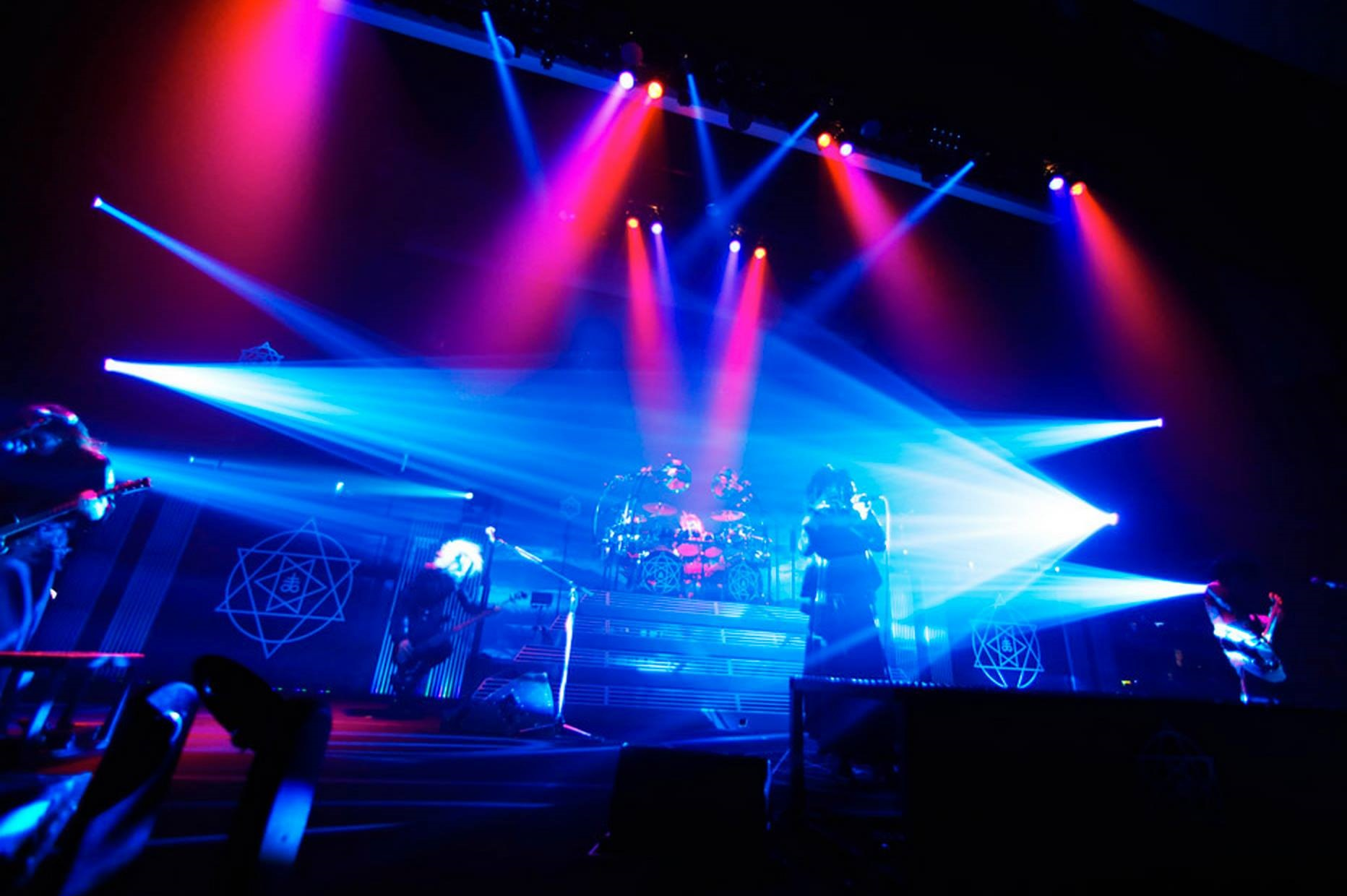
The Gazette performing in 2016

After their 13th anniversary, the Gazette announced a musical cycle called Project: Dark Age consisting of 13 movements, including the overture and a grand finale. The 1st movement was their latest album, Dogma, while the 2nd was a tour promoting it, Dogmatic -Un-. The 3rd movement was the release of a single titled "Ugly" on November 18, 2015. The 4th movement was a tour, Dogmatic -Due-, that started on December 1, 2015, and ended on January 24, 2016. The 5th movement was the Dogmatic tour finale, which was held at Yoyogi National Gymnasium on February 28, 2016. The 6th was the single "Undying", released on April 27, 2016. Following this, the Dogmatic tour took the Gazette to the U.S. and Canada for the first time in their career, where the live performances were the 7th movement. The 8th and 9th movements were Asian and European tours, respectively, that saw them visit Taiwan, China, France, Germany, Finland and Russia. The 10th movement was the release of a DVD containing the Dogmatic tour's finale, while the 11th was a standing live tour in Japan titled Dogmatic -Another Fate-.

The Gazette performed at Knotfest Japan in November 2016.

=== 2018–2019: Ninth, Tours and Departure from PS Company ===
The Gazette released their ninth studio album, Ninth, on June 13, 2018. To complement the release, a music video for the prologue track, "Falling", debuted on their official web site on March 10—also marking their 16th anniversary—and then on YouTube on March 16. When the album was released digitally, Ninth topped the iTunes rock charts in Belarus, Finland, France, Hungary, Poland, Turkey and Sweden, and reached top ten in Bulgaria, Germany, Italy, Netherlands, Portugal, Russia, Slovakia and Spain.

On June 29, 2018, the Gazette announced that they established their own independent company, Heresy Inc., and departed PS Company. On July 19, the first phase of their Ninth Tours started (Live Tour 18-19 Phase #01: Phenomemon) in hall-type venues in Japan. It ended on September 4, 2018.

On November 6, 2018, the second phase of the tours started (Live Tour 18-19 The Ninth Phase #02: Enhancement) in medium-sized venues in Japan. It ended on December 11, 2018.

On February 1, 2019, the third phase began (Live Tour 18-19 The Ninth Phase #03: Gekijou wa Doumou) and took place in smaller venues that offered a more intimate feeling between the fans and the band. It finished just as it started, with special live performances limited to fanclub members, on March 20, 2019.

World Tour 19 The Ninth Phase #04 -99.999- began on April 30, 2019, and was held in 13 cities across 10 countries. It included their first show in the UK in 12 years, which was sold out. The world tour ended on June 30, 2019, with the second show in Taipei.

On August 10, 2019, the GazettE performed at the third day of the Rock in Japan Festival for the third continuous year (Rock In Japan 2017, Rock In Japan 2018). On August 15, they held Live Tour 18-19 The Ninth Phase #05: Konketsu, which was a live at the Yokosuka Arts Theatre to prepare for the Final in September. The venue was sold out in minutes after the absence of the band overseas, and the setlist was a mix of older songs and the new album.

With the Final approaching on September 23, 2019, the Gazette changed their looks and outfits, and announced a collaboration (the GazettE × Yokohama Collaboration Project) that included a special design day-pass for the Minatomirai Line, a themed restaurant in Yokohama Chinatown and a stamp rally with rewards. The collaboration lasted from September 7 to the day of the Final, September 23.

=== 2021–present: Mass, Reita's death and Aoi's dismissal ===
On March 10, 2021, their nineteenth anniversary, the Gazette released the song "Blinding Hope" and announced their 10th studio album, Mass. It was released on May 23 and promoted by an online event with autograph and meet and greet sessions, where participants were chosen by lottery.

A new look was presented at the end of February 2022, for the show celebrating their 20 anniversary at Yoyogi National Gymnasium. They also announced a compilation album titled Heterodoxy -Divided 3 Concepts-, which includes 47 songs and was released on December 21. On December 28, former drummer Yune died. In July 2023, after a show at Nippon Budokan that was part of the Mass tour, the group released a teaser for a new release in 2024.

On April 16, 2024, the band announced via their official website that bassist Reita had died the day before.

On March 10, 2026, the band announced via their official website that guitarist Aoi had been removed from the band, giving various misdemeanours towards the band members and staff as the reason. In a separate statement posted to his X account, Aoi elaborated that he had informed the band in April 2025 about his intention to leave that September, refuting the allegations outlined in the band's statement.

== Members ==
Current members

- Ruki (ルキ) – lead vocals, sampler, guitars (2002–present)
- Uruha (麗) – guitars, backing vocals (2002–present)
- Kai (戒) – drums, percussion, keyboards, backing vocals, bandleader (2003–present)

Former members

- Yune (由寧) – drums, percussion (2002–2003; died 2022)
- Reita (れいた) – bass, keyboards, backing vocals (2002–2024; died 2024)
- Aoi (葵) – guitars, backing vocals (2002–2026)

Timeline

== Discography ==
The Gazette discography
- Studio albums: 10
- Extended plays: 6
- Compilation albums: 3
- Singles: 25
- Video albums: 39+

=== Studio albums ===
Title	Release date	Label	Oricon Charts	TWN Combo
Disorder	October 13, 2004	PS Company	19	–
Nil	February 8, 2006	King Records / JPU Records	4	17
Stacked Rubbish	July 4, 2007	King Records / JPU Records	3	16
Dim	July 15, 2009	King Records / JPU Records	5	11
Toxic	October 5, 2011	Sony Music / JPU Records	6	–
Division	August 29, 2012	Sony Music / JPU Records	4	–
Beautiful Deformity	October 23, 2013	Sony Music / JPU Records	8	
Dogma	August 26, 2015	Sony Music / JPU Records	3	–
Ninth	June 13, 2018	Sony Music / JPU Records	3	–
Mass	May 26, 2021	Sony Music / JPU Records	4	–

=== EPs ===
Title	Release date	Label	Oricon Charts
Cockayne Soup	May 28, 2003	PS Company	99
Akuyuukai (悪友會 ～あくゆうかい～; 'Meeting Bad Company')	June 25, 2003	PS Company	100
Spermargarita (スペルマルガリィタ)	July 30, 2003	PS Company	78
Hankou Seimeibun (犯行声明文; Letter of Responsibility)	October 1, 2003	PS Company	62
Madara (斑蠡 ～MADARA～)	March 30, 2004	PS Company	38
Gama (蝦蟇 (がま); 'Toad')	August 3, 2005	PS Company	24

=== Singles ===
Title	Release date	Label	Oricon Charts
"Wakaremichi" (別れ道; 'Crossroads')	April 30, 2002	Matina	–
"Kichiku Kyoushi (32sai Dokushin) no Nousatsu Kouza"	August 30, 2002	Matina	–
"Gozen 0-ji no Trauma Radio"	November 1, 2002	Matina	273
"Zakurogata no Yuuutsu" (ザクロ型の憂鬱; Pomegranate Shaped Melancholy)	July 28, 2004	PS Company	23
"Zetsu" (舐～zetsu～; 'Lick')	July 28, 2004	PS Company	24
"Miseinen" (未成年; 'Minor')	July 28, 2004	PS Company	25
"Dainippon Itangeishateki Noumiso Chuzuri Zecchou Zekkei Ongenshuu"	July 28, 2004	PS Company	102
"Reila"	March 9, 2005	PS Company	8
"Cassis"	December 7, 2005	King Records / JPU Records	6
"Regret"	October 25, 2006	King Records / JPU Records	9
"Filth in the Beauty"	November 1, 2006	King Records / JPU Records	5
"Hyena"	February 7, 2007	King Records / JPU Records	4
"Guren" (紅蓮; 'Crimson Lotus')	February 13, 2008	King Records / JPU Records	3
"Leech"	November 12, 2008	King Records / JPU Records	2
"Distress and Coma"	March 25, 2009	King Records / JPU Records	3
"Before I Decay"	October 7, 2009	King Records / JPU Records	2
"Shiver"	July 21, 2010	Sony Music / JPU Records	2
"Red"	September 22, 2010	Sony Music / JPU Records	6
"Pledge"	December 15, 2010	Sony Music / JPU Records	2
"Vortex"	May 25, 2011	Sony Music / JPU Records	5
"Remember the Urge"	August 31, 2011	Sony Music / JPU Records	6
"Fadeless"	August 21, 2013	Sony Music / JPU Records	4
"Ugly"	November 18, 2015	Sony Music / JPU Records	16
"Undying"	April 27, 2016	Sony Music / JPU Records	10
"Blinding Hope"	March 10, 2021	Sony Music / JPU Records	–

=== Compilation albums ===
Title	Release date	Label	Oricon Charts	TWN AST ASIA
Dainihon Itangeishateki Noumiso Gyaku Kaiten Zekkyou Ongenshuu	May 3, 2006	PS Company	34	–
Traces Best of 2005–2009	April 6, 2011	King Records / JPU Records	19	–
Traces Vol.2	March 8, 2017	Sony Music / JPU Records	8	1

=== Compilations ===
- Yougenkyou (妖幻鏡; 'Moon') (December 25, 2002, Eternal)
  - (With the song "Okuribi" (おくり火))
- Kaleidoscope (May 1, 2003, PS Company)
  - (With the songs "Back Drop Junkie [Nancy]" and "Akai One Piece" (赤いワンピース))
- Hanamuke & Gazette Live (男尻ツアーファイナル) (May 6, 2003, PS Company)
  - (With the song "Machibouke no Kouen de" (待ちぼうけの公園))
- Japanesque Rock Collectionz (July 28, 2004)
  - (With the song "Okuribi" (おくり火))
- Rock Nippon Shouji Nori ko Selection (ロックNIPPON 東海林のり子セレクション) (January 24, 2007)
  - (With the song "Cassis")
- Fuck the Border Line (Tribute for Kuroyume) (February 16, 2011, Avex Trax)
  - (With the song "C.Y.Head")
- Under Cover II (Tribute to TM Revolution) (February 27, 2013)
  - (With the song "Shakin' Love")

=== Books ===
- Verwelktes Gedicht (October 20, 2005, PS Company)
  - (With the song "Kare Uta" (枯詩; 'Withered Poem'))
- Nil Band Score (April 28, 2006, King Records)
- Dainippon Itan Geisha-teki Noumiso Gyaku Kaiten Zekkyou Ongen Shuu Band Score (March 13, 2007, King Records)
- Stacked Rubbish Band Score (March 1, 2008, King Records)
- Dim Band Score (September 14, 2009, King Records)
- Traces Best of 2005–2009 Band Score (October 1, 2012, King Records)
- Toxic Band Score (October 1, 2012, Sony Music Entertainment Japan)
- Division Band Score (February 3, 2013, Sony Music Entertainment Japan)
- Beautiful Deformity Band Score (December 28, 2013, Sony Music Entertainment Japan)
- The Gazette World Tour 13 39395 Mile (March 10, 2014, PS Company)

=== Other releases ===
- "Doro Darake no Seishun." (泥だらけの青春。; 'Mud Covered Youth.') (October 8, 2003)
- "Juuyon sai no Knife" (十四歳のナイフ; 'Fourteen Year-Old's Knife') (September 11, 2004, King Records)
- "Chigire" (チギレ; Torn) (August 10, 2005, King Records)

== Videography ==
=== Live DVDs ===
Title	Release date	Label	Chart Positions
Matina Sai Shusho -Final Prelude- (Various artists)	April 10, 2003	Matina	
Tokyo Saiban -Judgment Day- (東京裁判〜JUDGMENT DAY〜)	April 28, 2004	PS Company	33
Heisei Banka (平成挽歌)	August 25, 2004	PS Company	45
Standing Tour 2005 Final [M.R.D] at 2005.4.17 Shibuya Kokaido Live (渋谷公会堂)	July 6, 2005	PS Company	25
Standing Live Tour 2006 [Nameless Liberty.Six Guns...] Tour Final at Nippon Budokan	September 6, 2006	King Records	9
Tour 2006-2007 [Decomposition Beauty] Final Meaningless Art That People Showed at Yokohama Arena	June 13, 2007	King Records	5
Tour 2007-2008 Stacked Rubbish Grand Finale [Repeated Countless Error] in Yoyogi National Gymnasium	August 6, 2008	King Records	3
Peace & Smile Carnival Tour 2005	December 24, 2008	King Records	83
Peace & Smile Carnival Tour 2009 at Nippon Budokan	April 15, 2009	King Records	7
Tour09 -Dim Scene- Final at Saitama Super Arena	December 16, 2009	King Records	13
The Nameless Liberty 10.12.26 at Tokyo Dome	April 6, 2011	Sony Music	10
Tour11-12 Venomous Cell Finale Omega Live at 01.14 Yokohama Arena	May 9, 2012	Sony Music	1
The Gazette 10th Anniversary The Decade at 03.10 Makuhari Messe	January 9, 2013	Sony Music	4
Live Tour 12-13 [Division] Final Melt Live at 03.10 Saitama Super Arena	June 26, 2013	Sony Music	10
The Gazette World Tour 13 Documentary	February 26, 2014	Sony Music	6
Live Tour 13-14 [Magnificent Malformed Box] Final Coda Live at 01.11 Yokohama Arena	May 21, 2014	Sony Music	3
Standing Live Tour 14 Heresy Limited -Saiteigi- Complete Box	March 11, 2015	Sony Music	34
The Gazette Live Tour 15-16 Dogmatic Final -Shikkoku- Live at 02.28 National Yoyogi Stadium First Gymnasium	November 21, 2016	Sony Music	2
The Gazette World Tour 16 Documentary Dogmatic -Trois-	January 25, 2017	Sony Music	25
Halloween Night 17 The Dark Horror Show Spooky Box 2 -Abyss- -Lucy- Live at 10.30 and 10.31 Toyosu Pit Tokyo	February 28, 2018	Sony Music	10
Live Tour 18-19 The Ninth / Final Daiku Live at 09.23 Yokohama Arena	March 4, 2020	Sony Music	
Live in New York & World Tour 19 Documentary The Ninth [99.999]	March 4, 2020	Sony Music	
Live Tour 2022-2023 / MASS 'The Final' Live At 07.15 Nippon Budokan	April 17, 2024	Sony Music	

=== Music video collections ===
Title	Release date	Label	Chart Positions
Madara (斑蠡〜MADARA〜)	May 26, 2004	PS Company	54
Film Bug I	June 7, 2006	King Records	10
Film Bug II	August 4, 2010	King Records	7
Film Bug III	December 24, 2014	Sony Music	25

VHS

- Sentimental Video (センチメンタルビデオ) (April 30, 2002)
- Shichoukaku Shitsu (視聴覚 質) (August 30, 2002)
- Kenka Jouto (喧嘩上等) (April 29, 2003)
- Hyakkiyagyou (百鬼夜行) (October 1, 2003)
