= Cockayne Soup =

EP by The Gazette
- Released: May 28, 2003
- Recorded: 2002–2003
- Genre: Punk rock
- Label: PS Company

The Gazette chronology
Cockayne Soup (2003)	Akuyuukai (2003)

Cockayne Soup is the first EP by Japanese rock band the Gazette, released on May 28, 2003. The first pressings of this CD were limited to 5000 copies, which sold out. It ranked 99th position on Oricon weekly charts and 13th on Oricon indies chart, selling 2,905 copies in the first two weeks.

== Promotion and release ==
Cockayne Soup was the "first part" of a release campaign for three consecutive EPs, one per month, followed by Akuyuukai and Spermargarita. The campaign was named Dai Nippon Itangēshateki Nōmiso Gyaku Kaiten Zekyōon Genshū (大日本異端芸者的脳味噌逆回転絶叫音源集), and the tracks from all EPs were collected into a compilation of the same name in 2006. It was possible to acquire the albums at pre-sale on the band's website. Akuyuukai and Spermargarita were re-released in 2005 by King Records, however, the same did not happen with Cockayne Soup.

Describing the four tracks, visual kei portal Visunavi assimilated "Beautiful 5 [shit]ers" as hard and heavy. This song has not had its official lyrics revealed, and in the booklet the lyrics shown are actually a passage from Heart Sutra. "32 Koukei no Kenjuu" (32口径の拳銃), the second track, has "a hard riff, a sense of speed, and a sad chorus". The portal reported that "Shiawase na Hibi" (幸せな日々) employs melancholic melody and lyrics. Describing the latter track, they opined that the lyrics are "interesting to read" and are fused with heavy sounds, with a sad and impressive melody. This last track was originally released on the single "Gozen 0-ji no trauma Radio" (2002), and for this EP it was re-recorded with new drummer Kai.

== Track listing ==
All lyrics are written by Ruki; all music is composed by the Gazette.

No.	Title	Length
1.	"Beautiful 5 [shit]ers"	3:24
2.	"32 Koukei no Kenjuu" (32口径の拳銃; "32 Caliber Pistol")	5:41
3.	"Shiawase na Hibi" (幸せな日々; "Happy Days")	4:39
4.	"Haru ni Chirikeri, Mi wa Kareru de Gozaimasu" (春ニ散リケリ、身ハ枯レルデゴザイマス; "in spring (my leaves) will fall, and my body will wither")	5:29

== Personnel ==
- Ruki — vocals
- Uruha — lead guitar
- Aoi — rhythm guitar
- Reita — bass
- Kai — drums (credited but not recorded)
- Yune — drums (recorded but not credited)
