= Ninth (The Gazette album) =

Studio album by The Gazette
- Released: June 13, 2018
- Genres: Industrial metal; metalcore
- Length: 42:42
- Languages: Japanese, English
- Label: Sony Japan
- Producer: The Gazette

The Gazette chronology
Dogma (2015)	Ninth (2018)	Mass (2021)

Ninth (stylized as NINTH in Japan) is the ninth studio album by Japanese visual kei rock band The Gazette, released on June 13, 2018 in the US and Japan by Sony Music Records and in the UK, Europe and Russia by JPU Records. When the album was released as a download, Ninth topped the iTunes rock charts in Belarus, Finland, France, Hungary, Poland, Turkey and Sweden, and reached top ten in Bulgaria, Germany, Italy, Netherlands, Portugal, Russia, Slovakia and Spain. The band also charted the Billboard world chart for the first time, with the album placing 7th in its first week.

The JPU Records release includes lyric translations into English as well as Romaji.

== Track listing ==
=== Limited Edition A ===
Disc One - CD
No.	Title	Length
1.	"99.999"	1:17
2.	"Falling -Ninth Mix-"	3:48
3.	"Ninth Odd Smell"	3:23
4.	"Gush"	3:27
5.	"The Mortal"	4:04
6.	"Utsu semi" (虚蜩; "Emptiness")	3:47
7.	"Sonokoe wa moroku" (その声は脆く; "That Voice Is Brittle")	5:02
8.	"Babylon's Taboo"	3:55
9.	"Uragiru bero" (裏切る舌; "Betrayal Tongue")	3:30
10.	"Two of a Kind"	4:00
11.	"Abhor God"	2:58
12.	"Unfinished"	3:51

Disc Two - Blu-ray
No.	Title	Length
1.	"Falling (Music Video)"
2.	"MAKING OF “Falling” MUSIC VIDEO"
3.	"『十五周年記念公演 大日本異端芸者「暴動区 愚鈍の桜」LIVE AT 2017.03.10 国立代々木競技場第一体育館』FULL LIVE映像"

=== Limited Edition B ===
Disc One - CD
No.	Title	Length
1.	"99.999"	1:17
2.	"Falling -Ninth Mix-"	3:48
3.	"Ninth Odd Smell"	3:23
4.	"Gush"	3:27
5.	"The Mortal"	4:04
6.	"Utsu semi" (虚蜩; "Emptiness")	3:47
7.	"Sonokoe wa moroku" (その声は脆く; "That Voice Is Brittle")	5:02
8.	"Babylon's Taboo"	3:55
9.	"Uragiru bero" (裏切る舌; "Betrayal Tongue")	3:30
10.	"Two of a Kind"	4:00
11.	"Abhor God"	2:58
12.	"Unfinished"	3:51

Disc Two - DVD
No.	Title	Length
1.	"Falling (Music Video)"
2.	"MAKING OF “Falling” MUSIC VIDEO"

Disc Three - DVD
No.	Title	Length
1.	"『十五周年記念公演 大日本異端芸者「暴動区 愚鈍の桜」LIVE AT 2017.03.10 国立代々木競技場第一体育館』FULL LIVE映像"

=== Regular Edition ===
No.	Title	Length
1.	"99.999"	1:17
2.	"Falling -Ninth Mix-"	3:48
3.	"Ninth Odd Smell"	3:23
4.	"Gush"	3:27
5.	"The Mortal"	4:04
6.	"Utsu semi" (虚蜩; "Emptiness")	3:47
7.	"Sonokoe wa moroku" (その声は脆く; "That Voice Is Brittle")	5:02
8.	"Babylon's Taboo"	3:55
9.	"Uragiru bero" (裏切る舌; "Betrayal Tongue")	3:30
10.	"Two of a Kind"	4:00
11.	"Abhor God"	2:58
12.	"Unfinished"	3:51
