= Regret (The Gazette song) =

- Optical Impression

Single by The Gazette

from the album Stacked Rubbish
- Released: October 25, 2006 (JP); May 13, 2007 (EU)
- Genre: Alternative rock, alternative metal
- Label: King Records (JP); JPU Records (EU, NA); CLJ Records (EU) (defunct)

The Gazette singles chronology
"Cassis" (2005)	"Regret" (2006)	"Filth in the Beauty" (2006)

"Regret" is a maxi single by The Gazette. It was released as two different types: the Optical Impression and Auditory Impression, the first coming with a DVD with the music video for the song "Regret", and the second with a bonus track.

== Track listing ==
=== Regret -Optical Impression- ===
Disc one

1. "Regret" - 4:30
2. "Psychedelic Heroine" - 3:20

Disc two (DVD)

1. "Regret" - 4:30
2. "Making of Regret"

=== Regret -Auditory Impression- ===
1. "Regret" - 4:30
2. "Psychedelic Heroine" - 3:20
3. "Worthless War" 3:50

== Note ==
- The music video for "Regret" was already viewable a few months before the official release of the single.
- The single reached a peak mark of #9 on the Japanese Oricon Weekly Charts.
