= Fadeless =

Single by The Gazette

from the album Beautiful Deformity
- Released: August 21, 2013
- Genre: Alternative Rock, hard rock
- Label: Sony Music Records
- Songwriter(s): Y Ji, Y Lee

The Gazette singles chronology
"Remember the Urge" (2011)	"Fadeless" (2013)	"Ugly" (2015)

"Fadeless" is a maxi-single by the Japanese rock band, The Gazette. It was released on August 21, 2013 in two editions; the "Optical Impression" edition and "Auditory Impression" edition. The first edition includes two songs "Fadeless" and "Quiet", and a DVD containing the music video for the song "Fadeless". The second edition comes with a bonus track "Forbidden Beaver".

== Track listing ==
=== Fadeless: Optical Impression ===
Disc one

1. "Fadeless" - 4:05
2. "Quiet" - 5:23

Disc two (DVD)

1. "Fadeless: Music Clip" - 4:16

=== Fadeless: Auditory Impression ===
1. "Fadeless" - 4:05
2. "Quiet" - 5:23
3. "Forbidden Beaver" - 3:31

== Note ==
- The single reached a peak mark of #4 on the Japanese Oricon Weekly Charts.
