= Remember the Urge =

Single by The Gazette
- Released: August 31, 2011
- Genre: Alternative metal
- Label: Sony Music Records

The Gazette singles chronology
"Vortex" (2011)	"Remember the Urge" (2011)	"Fadeless" (2013)

"Remember the Urge" is a non-album maxi-single by the Japanese rock band, The Gazette. It was released on August 31, 2011 in two editions; the "Optical Impression" edition, "Auditory Impression" edition. The first includes the songs "Remember the Urge" and "Clever Monkey"- it also includes a DVD containing the music video and making for the song "Remember the Urge". The second comes with a bonus track, "Chijou".

== Track listing ==
=== Remember the Urge: Optical Impression ===
Disk one

1. "Remember the Urge" - 4:04
2. "Clever Monkey" - 2:58

Disc two (DVD)

1. "Remember the Urge: Music Clip + Making" - 6:25

=== Remember the Urge: Auditory Impression ===
1. "Remember the Urge" - 4:04
2. "Clever Monkey" - 2:58
3. "Chijou" - 3:24

== Note ==
- The single reached a peak mark of #6 on the Japanese Oricon Weekly Charts.
