= Red (The Gazette song) =

Single by The Gazette

from the album Toxic
- Released: September 22, 2010
- Genre: Industrial metal, Alternative metal, alternative rock
- Label: Sony Music Records
- Songwriter(s): Matusmoto Akihiko

The Gazette singles chronology
"Shiver" (2010)	"Red" (2010)	"Pledge" (2010)

"Red" is a maxi-single by the Japanese rock band, The Gazette. It was released on September 22, 2010 in two editions; the "Optical Impression" edition, "Auditory Impression" edition. The first includes the songs "Red" and "Vermin"- it also includes a DVD containing the music video and making for the song "Red". The second comes with a bonus track, "An Unbearable Fact".

== Track listing ==
=== Red: Optical Impression ===
Disk one

1. "Red" - 3:25
2. "Vermin" - 3:50

Disc two (DVD)

1. "Red: Music Clip + Making" - 6:60

=== Red: Auditory Impression ===
1. "Red" - 3:25
2. "Vermin" - 3:50
3. "An Unbearable Fact" - 3:33

== Notes ==
- This single was known a few months before the release date.
- Promotional video was available two weeks before the actual release date.
- The single reached a peak mark of #6 on the Japanese Oricon Weekly Charts.
