= Before I Decay =

Single by The Gazette

from the album Traces Best of 2005-2009
- Released: October 7, 2009
- Genre: Alternative metal, Nu metal, Alternative rock
- Label: King Records
- Composer(s): the Gazette.
- Lyricist(s): Ruki

The Gazette singles chronology
"Distress and Coma" (2009)	"Before I Decay" (2009)	"Shiver" (2010)

"Before I Decay" is a single by Japanese rock band, The Gazette. It was released on 7 October 2009. The single reached #2 on the Oricon Weekly Charts, selling 28,546 copies in its first week.

== Track listing ==
1. "Before I Decay" – 3:44
2. "Mayakashi" (瞞し; Deception) – 4:05

All music by the Gazette. All lyrics by Ruki.

Disk 2

1. "Before I Decay" (Music video) (Optical Impression Only)
