= Dainihon Itangeishateki Noumiso Gyaku Kaiten Zekkyou Ongenshuu =

Compilation album by the Gazette
- Released: May 3, 2006
- Genre: Punk rock
- Label: PS Company

The Gazette chronology
Nil (2006)	Dainihon Itangeishateki Noumiso Gyaku Kaiten Zekkyou Ongenshuu (2006)	Stacked Rubbish (2007)

Dainihon Itangeishateki Noumiso Gyaku Kaiten Zekkyou Ongenshuu (大日本異端芸者的脳味噌逆回転絶叫音源集, lit. "A Collection of Hallucinatory Screams from a Heretical Geisha from the Great Empire of Japan"), abbrev. Nihon no Itangeisha (日本の異端芸者, lit. "A Heretical Geisha from Japan"), is a compilation album by the Gazette, featuring all songs of their previously released EPs Cockayne Soup, Akuyuukai and Spermargarita on one disc. It peaked at number 34 on Oricon Albums Chart.

== Track listing ==
All lyrics are written by Ruki; all music is composed by the Gazette.

No.	Title	EP	Length
1.	"Beautiful 5 [shit]ers"	Cockayne Soup	3:24
2.	"Sanjūni Kōkei no Kenjū" (32口径の拳銃; "32 Caliber Pistol")	Cockayne Soup	5:41
3.	"Shiawase na Hibi" (幸せな日々; "Happy Days")	Cockayne Soup	4:39
4.	"Haru ni Chirikeri, Mi wa Kareru de Gozaimasu" (春ニ散リケリ、身ハ枯レルデゴザイマス; "in spring (my leaves) will fall, and my body will wither")	Cockayne Soup	5:29
5.	"Oni no Men" (鬼の面; "The Demon's Face")	Akuyuukai	5:02
6.	"Ray"	Akuyuukai	5:49
7.	"Wife" (ワイフ)	Akuyuukai	5:22
8.	"Ito" (絲; "Thread")	Akuyuukai	6:41
9.	"Linda~candydive pinky heaven~"	Spermargarita	4:17
10.	"Black Spangle Gang" (ブラックスパンコール ギャング)	Spermargarita	4:06
11.	"Wakaremichi" (別れ道; "Crossroads")	Spermargarita	5:22
12.	"Best Friends"	Spermargarita	4:20

== Personnel ==
- Ruki — Vocals
- Uruha — Lead guitar, backing vocals
- Aoi — Rhythm guitar, acoustic guitar, backing vocals
- Reita — Bass, backing vocals
- Kai — Drums, percussion (credited but not recorded)
- Yune — Drums, percussion (recorded but not credited)

== Notes ==
- "Shiawase na Hibi" and "Wife" are re-recordings of songs featured on the Gozen 0-ji no Trauma Radio single, released in 2002.
- "Wakaremichi" is a re-recording of the initial track from the Wakaremichi single, also released in 2002.
