= Stacked Rubbish =

Studio album by the Gazette
- Released: July 4, 2007
- Studio: Sound Crew
- Genre: Alternative metal; nu metal; hard rock; alternative rock
- Length: 56:08
- Label: King Records

The Gazette chronology
Dainihon itangeishateki... (2006)	Stacked Rubbish (2007)	Dim (2009)

Singles from Stacked Rubbish
- 1. "Regret" Released: October 25, 2006; 2. "Filth in the Beauty" Released: November 1, 2006; 3. "Hyena" Released: February 7, 2007

Stacked Rubbish is the third studio album by Japanese rock band the Gazette. It was released on July 4, 2007, in Japan and on August 24 in Europe. It was later re-released in Europe and North America on August 14, 2015, by JPU Records.

Stacked Rubbish debuted at number three on the Oricon charts with 33,007 units sold in the first week. The limited edition comes with a slipcase with alternative cover art and a special lyrics booklet. This was the first album to contain any songs by Kai.

== Track listing ==
All music is by the Gazette and all lyrics are by Ruki.

1. "Art Drawn By Vomit" – 1:49
2. "Agony" – 4:15
3. "Hyena" – 4:16
4. "Burial Applicant" – 4:27
5. "Ganges ni Akai Bara" (ガンジスに紅い薔薇; The Ganges Red Roses) – 4:08
6. "Regret" – 4:30
7. "Calm Envy" – 6:05
8. "Swallowtail on the Death Valley" – 4:06
9. "Mob 136 Bars" – 2:39
10. "Gentle Lie" – 3:53
11. "Filth in the Beauty" – 4:11
12. "Circle of Swindler" – 2:58
13. "Chizuru" (千鶴; A Thousand Cranes) – 5:47
14. "People Error" – 2:58

Disc two (DVD, limited edition only)

1. "Burial Applicant
2. "Chizuru "Apartment" Movie Version" (千鶴 (映画[アパートメント]劇場上映ver.); Movie [Apartment] Theater Screening)

== Personnel ==
- Ruki – lead vocals
- Uruha – lead guitar, backing vocals
- Aoi – rhythm guitar, backing vocals
- Reita – bass, piano (on "People Error"), backing vocals
- Kai – drums, percussion, backing vocals
