= Madara (EP) =

EP by The Gazette
- Released: March 30, 2004; November 23, 2005 (Reissue)
- Recorded: Studio Moopies
- Genre: Hardcore punk; avant-garde metal
- Length: 24:15; 19:56(Reissue)
- Label: PS Company
- Producer: Tomomi Ozaki (PS Company)

The Gazette chronology
Hankou Seimeibun (2003)	Madara (2004)	Disorder (2004)

Madara (斑蠡) is an EP release by Japanese band The Gazette released on March 30, 2004. The first press edition came housed in a special case, the outer part being a slipcase and the inner part containing the disc and booklet in a disc holder.

== Track listing ==
All lyrics are written by Ruki; all music is composed by the Gazette.

No.	Title	Length
1.	"Mad Marble Hell Vision"	3:24
2.	"Shiikureta Haru, Kawarenu Haru" (飼育れた春、変われぬ春; "Domesticated Spring, Unchangeable Spring")	4:19
3.	"Ruder"	3:14
4.	"No.[666]"	3:24
5.	"Sumire" (菫; "Violet")	4:19
6.	"Anata no Tame no Kono Inochi." (貴女ノ為ノ此ノ命。; "This life for you")	5:33

== Notes ==
- Madara was reissued in 2005.
- "Sumire" was only featured on the first pressings of the album. The reissue contains only 5 songs.
