= Spermargarita =

EP by The Gazette
- Released: July 30, 2003; November 23, 2005 (Reissue)
- Recorded: 2002–2003
- Genre: Punk rock
- Label: PS Company

The Gazette chronology
Akuyuukai (2003)	Spermargarita (2003)	Hankou Seimeibun (2003)

Spermargarita (スペルマルガリィタ) is an EP released by The Gazette on July 30, 2003.

The songs from this release are featured on the compilation album Dainihon Itangeishateki Noumiso Gyaku Kaiten Zekkyou Ongenshuu, along with the tracks from Akuyuukai and Cockayne Soup.

== Track listing ==
All lyrics are written by Ruki; all music is composed by the Gazette

No.	Title	Length
1.	"Linda~candydive pinky heaven~"	4:17
2.	"Black Spangle Gang" (ブラックスパンコール ギャング)	4:06
3.	"Wakaremichi" (別れ道; "Crossroads")	5:22
4.	"Best Friends"	4:20

== Personnel ==
- Ruki — Vocals
- Uruha — Lead guitar
- Aoi — Rhythm guitar
- Reita — Bass
- Kai — Drums (credited but not recorded)
- Yune — Drums (recorded but not credited)

== Notes ==
- The title, "Spermargarita" is a Japanese pun combining the words sperm (スペルマ) and margarita (マルガリィタ). "Super Margarita" and "Spell Margarita" are common mistranslations.
- "Wakaremichi" is a re-recording of the initial track from the Wakaremichi single, released in 2002.
- 'Spermargarita' was reissued in 2005.
