= Vortex (song) =

Single by The Gazette

from the album Toxic
- Released: May 25, 2011
- Genre: Industrial metal, Nu metal, hard rock
- Label: Sony Music Records

The Gazette singles chronology
"Pledge" (2010)	"Vortex" (2011)	"Remember the Urge" (2011)

"Vortex" is a maxi-single by the Japanese rock band, The Gazette. It was released on May 25, 2011 in two editions; the "Optical Impression" edition and "Auditory Impression" edition. The first edition includes two songs "Vortex" and "Uncertain Sense", and a DVD containing the music video and making for the song "Vortex". The second edition comes with a bonus track "Break Me".

== Track listing ==
=== Vortex: Optical Impression ===
Disc one

1. "Vortex" - 4:07
2. "Uncertain Sense" - 3:28

Disc two (DVD)

1. "Vortex: Music Clip + Making" - 7:03

=== Vortex: Auditory Impression ===
1. "Vortex" - 4:07
2. "Uncertain Sense" - 3:28
3. "Break Me" - 3:35

== Notes ==
- The single was revealed a month before its initial release.
- Preview of the PV was shown a month before its initial release.
- The single reached a peak mark of #5 on the Japanese Oricon Weekly Charts.
