= Undying (song) =

Single by The Gazette
- Language: Japanese
- Released: April 27, 2016
- Recorded: November 2015
- Genre: Metalcore
- Label: Sony Music Records

The Gazette singles chronology
"Ugly" (2015)	"Undying" (2016)

"Undying" is the twenty-third single by Japanese rock band The Gazette, released on April 27, 2016, in two editions. In Japan, it was released by Sony Music and in other regions by JPU Records.

== Promotion and release ==
"Undying" was announced in early December 2015 as the sixth movement of the Project: Dark Age, without many details. On February 26 the complete details were announced: it would be released in a limited edition and a regular one, as usual for the band, and album buyers at the February 27 concert at Yoyogi National Stadium would receive a bonus poster. The song was played for the first time at this show. On April 8, The Gazette's radio program on station InterFM897 announced that the song would be played on April 15. On the 22nd of the same month, the band published a video showcasing all the songs of the single and a part of the music video of "Undying".

The single was released on April 27, 2016. The limited edition featured two tracks on CD: "Undying" and "Malum", and a DVD with the music video for the title track and its making-of. The regular edition featured the two tracks and a bonus, "Vacant".

Along with the release of the single, The Gazette collaborated with brands Village Vanguard 27 and Gekirock Clothing to release clothing and accessories.

== Writing and composition ==
The release of "Undying" has already been decided since the release of Dogma, according to drummer Kai in an interview with Natalie. The recording, with the exception of the vocals, was made in November, a period in which the band was free. Kai said that the idea for the single was to expand the world vision of Dogma. Regarding the title of the song, vocalist Ruki said that it means that "the challenges that come our way will never end, they are undying".

About "Malum", Ruki said he was inspired by the film I Saw the Devil to write the lyrics. Guitarist Uruha commented that there was no intention of including this song on Dogma. The theme of this song and the album as a whole is "deep hatred", according to bassist Reita.

"Undying" ends the trilogy of releases with Dogma and the single "Ugly", the first and third movements of Project: Dark Age, and their covers complete each other.

== Commercial performance ==
"Undying" reached number ten on Oricon Singles Chart and stayed on chart for four weeks.

Reached 1st place on iTunes metal chart in Bulgaria, the United Kingdom, Italy, Finland and Sweden. In Kazakhstan, it ranked first on iTunes rock chart. On iTunes J-Pop Music Chart, the single reached number one in Thailand, Singapore and Malaysia. Finally, on iTunes World Music Chart, it ranked third in the United States and reached the top 3 in 18 more countries and the top 10 in 25.

The song came in 1st place in a poll of The Gazette's best songs made by JRock News website. Ryo of Girugamesh published a cover of the song on his YouTube channel.

== Track listing ==
Limited edition

Disc one (CD)
No.	Title	Length
1.	"Undying"	5:09
2.	"Malum"	3:28

Disc two (DVD)
No.	Title	Length
1.	"[UNDYING] MUSIC VIDEO"
2.	"MAKING OF [UNDYING] MV"

Regular edition

No.	Title	Length
1.	"Undying"	5:09
2.	"Malum"	3:28
3.	"Vacant"	4:33
Total length:		13:10

== Personnel ==
- Ruki – vocals
- Aoi – rhythm guitar
- Uruha – lead guitar
- Reita – bass
- Kai – drums
