= Hankou Seimeibun =

Hankō seimei bun

EP by the Gazette
- Released: October 1, 2003
- Recorded: Studio E-Star
- Genre: Hardcore punk; avant-garde metal
- Length: 19:03
- Label: PS Company
- Producer: Tomomi Ozaki (PS Company)

The Gazette chronology
Spermargarita (2003)	Hankō seimei bun (2003)	Madara (2004)

Hankou Seimeibun (犯行声明文) is an EP released by the Gazette on October 1, 2003. The first press edition came housed in a glossy paper case, with pictures of the band members and the lyrics for the EP.

== Track listing ==
All lyrics are written by Ruki; all music is composed by the Gazette

No.	Title	Length
1.	"Dis"	4:17
2.	"Red MoteL"	4:09
3.	"The Murder's TV"	4:30
4.	"Kore de Yokattan Desu..." (「これで良かったんです・・・」; "That was all right")	5:22
5.	"Hankō seimei bun" (犯行声明文; "Letter of Responsibility")	0:43

== Notes ==
- Hankou Seimeibun was re-released in 2005.
- "Hankou Seimeibun", the fifth track, is a bonus track, found only on the first pressings of the album.
