= Reita =

Japanese musician (1981–2024)

Reita れいた
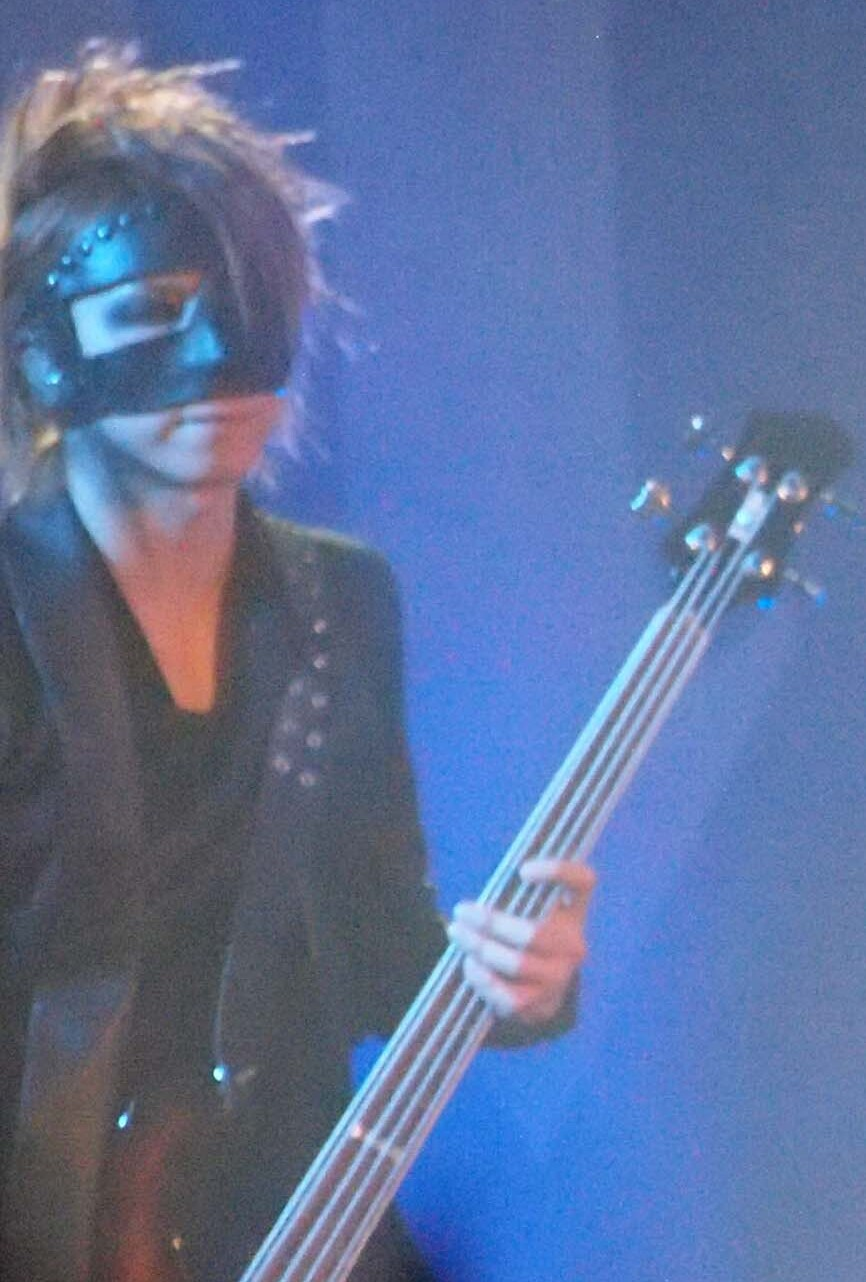
- Reita in 2016

Background information
- Born: May 27, 1981; Kanagawa Prefecture, Japan
- Died: April 15, 2024 (aged 42)
- Genres: Rock; heavy metal; alternative
- Instruments: Bass; keyboards
- Years active: 2001–2024
- Member of: The Gazette

Reita (れいた; or REITA) (May 27, 1981 – April 15, 2024) was a Japanese bassist and composer best known for being a member of the visual kei rock band The Gazette. He produced his instruments under the Japanese brand ESP and also owned a clothing brand called Snaked Lows.

The Gazette is noted as one of the biggest visual kei bands of their generation, and several artists mourned Reita's death in 2024.

== Early and personal life ==
Reita was born in Kanagawa Prefecture on May 27, 1981. He lived with his mother and older sister and was close to his grandmother. He and The Gazette's guitarist Uruha were childhood friends and met at their school's football club. In an interview with JRock News, Reita said that, despite his family not having much income, his dream of being a musician was stronger:

"When I was in second grade in junior high school, I was hanging out at Uruha’s house and we were just playing CDs and playing covers of the songs. It was just too much fun. That’s when I decided that I wanted to be a musician."

One of his hobbies outside of music was boxing, and he went to the gym regularly.

== Career ==
Reita started playing guitar in his second year of high school, and after seeing Luna Sea, he switched to electric guitar with the intention of joining a rock band, and even became part of a Luna Sea cover band. In the third year, he switched to bass because he became frustrated with the guitar.

Before The Gazette, he and Uruha were part of other short-lived original bands. With the stage name Reiki (澪祁), his first group was called Karasu and disbanded in 2001. In the same year, he joined Ma'die Kusse and soon after moved to L'ie:Chris, which changed its name to Kar+te=zyAnose and disbanded in 2002. Still in 2002, he formed The Gazette and changed his stage name to Reita. Until the group joined PS Company in 2003, he worked part-time jobs, including packing bread at a convenience store. On stage, he stayed on the right side along with guitarist Aoi. Like all the other members, he participated in composing the songs. He composed tracks such as "Malum" and "Karasu".

In 2008, Reita founded the clothing and silver accessories brand Snaked Lows, produced with Satoshi Yamashita of Deal Design.

In 2012, the musician changed the writing of his stage name in Hiragana, Reita (れいた), to REITA, romanized and in capital letters. In 2014 he joined Twitter, intending to impersonate himself.

The bassist was on the cover of Rock and Read magazine several times, including in August 2014 and 2017.

== Style and equipment ==
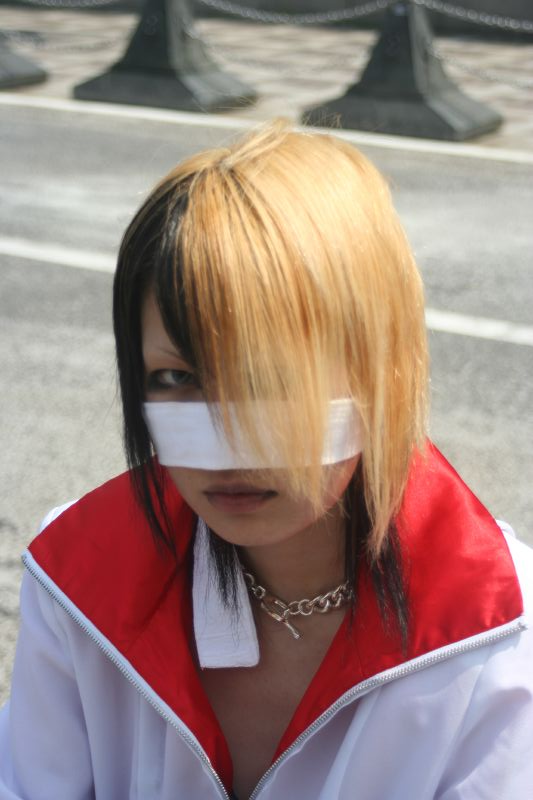
A Reita cosplayer on the Jingubashi Bridge in Harajuku, wearing the musician's signature mask.

Reita's main characteristic was to wear a mask covering his nose, originally white and made of cloth. From The Gazette's Project: Dark Age in 2015, he changed to a black leather mask and in 2017, rearranged it so that it marked the shape of his nose. He commented in 2017 that he could not purchase an iPhone X because the cell phone could only be unlocked with facial recognition. In addition to the mask, he wore blonde and spiky hair, covering half of his face.

The musician produced his basses in partnership with ESP and cited the ESP RF-01 and ESP RF-01 models as his favorites. He said to Bass Magazine that he mainly uses TWO NOTES/Torpedo Studio and EBS/ClassicLine 810 amplifiers with the Darkglass Electronics/Microtubes 900 top. In the band's early years, more specifically at the time of Nil (2006), he had limited equipment and used an Ampeg amplifier and a Mark Bass. After Stacked Rubbish (2007), which was recorded with a white ESP, he began purchasing more equipment and reported to Bass Magazine that he bought a bass almost every month. Beautiful Deformity (2013) was recorded with a Zon bass and Dogma (2015) with a Music Man Stingray. For the recording of Mass, his last album with The Gazette, he bought new basses, specifically from the Canadian brand Dingwall, but went back to using Ampeg amplifiers, in addition to playing with a SansAmp pedal and increasing the sound distortions.

He played with both his fingers and a pick and used the slap technique. During live performances, he would throw his bass up in the air and catch it.

Reita cited J of Luna Sea, Sid Vicious of Sex Pistols, Fieldy of Korn, Flea of Red Hot Chili Peppers, and Nikki Sixx of Mötley Crüe as the five bassists and bands that most influenced him. It was Luna Sea that inspired him to play in a band, after seeing them on TV.

== Death ==
On April 16, 2024, The Gazette announced Reita's death on its official website, which had occurred the day before. The cause of death was not disclosed and the funeral was held among close relatives. It was noted that his last message on his social media was: "I hope The Gazette lasts forever."

Several artists mourned the bassist's death on their social media, such as Sugizo, Riko Kohara, Sho Ayanokoji and the production of the anime Black Butler (The Gazette composed the second season's opening song, "Shiver"). On the 17th, the other four members of The Gazette published their messages about Reita's death.
