= Undying (video game) =

2023 video game

- Developer: Vanimals
- Publisher: Skystone Games
- Engine: Unity
- Platform: Windows
- Release: WW: December 7, 2023
- Genre: Survival
- Mode: Single-player

Undying is a 2023 survival video game developed by Vanimals and published by Skystone Games. Set in a zombie apocalypse, players control a woman who has been bitten by a zombie and must teach her child to survive before she loses her humanity.

== Gameplay ==
Players control Anling, a woman who has been bitten by a zombie. Knowing that her time is limited before she turns into a zombie, she attempts to instruct her 8 year old son Cody to survive on his own in their post-apocalyptic world. Like many survival games, players must manage Anling and Cody's health, hunger and thirst by searching, cooking and crafting items to survive another day.

Before Cody can be taught skills, players must unlock prerequisites, such as having Anling perform an action a certain number of times beside him. Once Cody's skill trees are unlocked, players can customize his abilities and eventually have him assist Anling with scavenging, cooking, and combat.

As Anling's condition degenerates, players receive feedback in the form of user interface elements and visual changes in her appearance. Each day, players must select a new penalty (in the form of symptoms) that Anling suffers as she progressively loses her humanity. However, she can also gain special perks or "zombie skills", such as the ability to heal damage by eating raw meat. Some symptoms can be cured with certain medicines.

Players also must manage their time efficiently, because when Anling's fatigue raises late at night, she will enter in a "weak state", leaving her unable to do any action, and where her chances of turning increases. To avoid that, she must rest before that happens. As time passes, Anling's infection will reach a "decline stage", that is a permanent effect that offers a heavy advantage and disadvantage to her status.

Besides Anling's health, players must manage Cody's stress levels, which can impact how well he learns. One way to manage this is to pass time with him at home by reading comics, playing videogames or play music. Some books can boost Cody's skills by answering correct answers. If Cody survives long enough, he can investigate a rescue mission that will lead him to safety.

An optional survival mode challenges players to survive as long as they can against overwhelming numbers of zombies. There is also a story mode that excises the survival elements to focus on the story.

== Plot ==
After 4 months since the start of a zombie outbreak, Anling-Chan Monroe and her son Cody are being evacuated in an improvised military camp in a subway station, when suddenly the roof collapses, blocks the exit and a zombie horde attacks the camp. In the altercation, Anling gets bit in the arm by a zombie while protecting Cody and the duo barely manages to escape to find a car that gets them home.

After fortifying the windows from a zombie group and waiting upstairs, mother and son decide to scavenge their house and their neighborhood for supplies and something to open their locked back door. After finding a lockpick, they met their neighbor Mary, whose parents left to find supplies (They can give her some water in exchange for some seeds). After unlocking the back door and killing a zombie trapped in a bear trap, Anling decides to teach Cody to defend himself with a slingshot, practicing with the target in their backyard.

Later, Cody turns on the TV, but it only shows static. They decide to go to uncle John's farm to get a circuit board to fix it.

After barely fixing the TV, the duo learns of a last evacuation plan taking place in 56 days, but they can't get much information except of contacting an "Officer Willy" in a prison. Anling decides to use the remaining days to scavenge for more supplies and find survivors to get information about the evacuation to get her son to safety. She decides to search in a supermarket and the subway station they escaped previously.

== Development ==
Developer Vanimals is based in Beijing, China. The game arose from the studio's desire to "create a survival game with an emotional core" and do something different than traditional zombie games. The initial concept involved a wounded woman who searches for her missing child. They came to see this as "too lonely" and added Cody to the start of the game. Inspired by The Walking Dead, they had Anling become progressively sicker instead of instantly turning into a zombie once bitten. They reasoned that this also allowed them to spend more time telling the story. The gameplay elements of Anglin's progressive deterioration came from David Brevik, co-founder of Skystone Games. Because the art is minimalist and the characters don't have faces, Vanimals depended in part on the soundtrack to cue emotional responses and alert players to characters' emotional states.

Undying entered early access in October 2021. Survival mode was added in November 2021, along with tweaks to how zombies spawn. An update in April 2022 gave players increased influence over Cody's behavior, expanded the skill trees, and added combos to melee combat. Undying is one of Skystone Games' first published games. They released the Windows version on December 7, 2023. Ports to other platforms are expected in 2024.

== Reception ==
Undying received mixed reviews on Metacritic. Dread Central, who reviewed Undying while it was in early access, praised the game's ability to do something new in the crowded zombie genre. Bloody Disgusting reviewed an early build in 2019 and, though they concluded that the gameplay was routine for a survival game, found that the addition of a time limit made Undying much more tense.
