= Filth in the Beauty =

- Optical Impression

Single by The Gazette

from the album Stacked Rubbish
- Released: November 1, 2006 (JP); May 13, 2007 (EU)
- Genre: Alternative metal, nu metal
- Label: King Records (JP); CLJ Records (EU)

The Gazette singles chronology
"Regret" (2006)	"Filth in the Beauty" (2006)	"Hyena" (2007)

"Filth in the Beauty" is a maxi-single by The Gazette. It was released as two different types: the Optical Impression and Auditory Impression, the first coming with a DVD with the music video for the song "Filth in the Beauty", and the second with a bonus track.

== Track listing ==
=== Filth in the Beauty: Optical Impression ===
Disc one

1. "Filth in the Beauty" – 4:11
2. "Rich Excrement" – 3:12

Disc two (DVD)

1. "Filth in the Beauty" – 4:11
2. "Making of Filth in the Beauty"

=== Filth in the Beauty: Auditory Impression ===
1. "Filth in the Beauty" – 4:11
2. "Rich Excrement" – 3:12
3. "Crucify Sorrow" – 4:06

== Note ==
- The music video for "Filth in the Beauty" was already viewable a few months before the official release of the single.
- The single reached a peak mark of #5 on the Japanese Oricon Weekly Charts.
