= Beautiful Deformity =

Studio album by the GazettE
- Released: October 23, 2013
- Genres: Hard rock; alternative metal; industrial metal; nu metal
- Length: 50:04
- Languages: Japanese, English
- Label: Sony Japan

The GazettE chronology
Division (2012)	Beautiful Deformity (2013)	Dogma (2015)

Singles from Beautiful Deformity
- 1. "Fadeless" Released: August 21, 2013

Beautiful Deformity is the seventh studio album by Japanese visual kei rock band the GazettE, released on October 23, 2013 in Japan by Sony Music Records and in the UK, Europe and Russia by JPU Records. It includes the single Fadeless.

The album peaked at No. 8 in the Oricon charts.

== Track listing ==
All lyrics are written by Ruki.

No.	Title	Music	Length
1.	"Malformed Box"	Ruki	1:27
2.	"Inside Beast"	Ruki	3:49
3.	"Until it Burns Out"	Ruki	3:45
4.	"Devouring One Another"	Aoi	3:29
5.	"Fadeless"	Ruki	4:05
6.	"Redo"	Kai	3:49
7.	"Last Heaven"	Ruki	4:43
8.	"Loss"	Uruha	4:07
9.	"The Stupid Tiny Insect"	Uruha	2:59
10.	"In Blossom"	Aoi	3:31
11.	"Karasu (鴉; Crow)"	Reita	3:46
12.	"Kuroku Sunda Sora to Zangai to Kataba (黒く澄んだ空と残骸と片翅; “The Sky that Cleared Out in Black and Ruins and Broken Wings)"	Ruki	3:58
13.	"To Dazzling Darkness"	Uruha	3:51
14.	"Coda"	Uruha	2:45

DVD (limited edition only)

1. "Malformed Box" Music Clip
2. "Inside Beast" Music Clip
