= Akuyuukai =

EP by The Gazette
- Released: June 25, 2003; November 23, 2005 (Reissue)
- Recorded: 2002–2003
- Genre: Punk rock
- Label: PS Company

The Gazette chronology
Cockayne Soup (2003)	Akuyuukai (2003)	Spermargarita (2003)

Akuyuukai (悪友會 -あくゆうかい-) is an EP released by The Gazette on June 25, 2003. The first pressings of this CD were limited to 5000 copies. A limited edition came in a digipack form. Also, the lyrics insert that came with the limited edition contains pictures not included in the regular edition.

The songs from this release are featured on the compilation album Dainihon Itangeishateki Noumiso Gyaku Kaiten Zekkyou Ongenshuu, along with the tracks from Spermargarita and Cockayne Soup.

== Track listing ==
All lyrics are written by Ruki; all music is composed by the Gazette.

No.	Title	Length
1.	"Oni no Men" (鬼の面; "The Demon's Face")	5:02
2.	"Ray"	5:49
3.	"Wife" (ワイフ)	5:22
4.	"Ito" (絲; "Thread")	6:41

== Personnel ==
- Ruki — Vocals
- Uruha — Lead guitar
- Aoi — Rhythm guitar
- Reita — Bass
- Kai — Drums (credited but not recorded)
- Yune — Drums (recorded but not credited)

== Notes ==
- "Wife" is a re-recording of the same song featured on the Gozen 0-ji no Trauma Radio single, released in 2002.
- Akuyuukai was reissued in 2005.
