= Hyena (song) =

Single by The Gazette

from the album Stacked Rubbish
- Released: February 7, 2007
- Genre: Hard rock, alternative rock, nu metal
- Label: King Records

The Gazette singles chronology
"Filth in the beauty" (2006)	"Hyena" (2007)	"Guren" (2008)

"Hyena" is the fourth major and 12th overall single released by The Gazette. It is their lone single of 2007. It was released in two different versions: an Optical Impression (CD+DVD) edition and an Auditory Impression edition. The CD+DVD edition included a DVD of the title song's PV, while the CD-only edition included the B-side song "Defective Tragedy". "Chizuru" was used as the theme song for the horror film Apt..

== Track listing ==
=== Hyena: Optical Impression ===
Disc one

1. "Hyena"
2. "Chizuru (千鶴; A Thousand Cranes)"

Disc two (DVD)

1. "Hyena Music Clip + Making"

=== Hyena: Auditory Impression ===
1. "Hyena"
2. "Chizuru (千鶴; A Thousand Cranes)"
3. "Defective Tragedy"

== Notes ==
- The single reached a peak mark of #4 on the Japanese Oricon Weekly Charts.
