= Pledge (song) =

Single by The Gazette

from the album Toxic
- Released: December 15, 2010
- Genre: Progressive rock
- Label: Sony Music Records

The Gazette singles chronology
"Red" (2010)	"Pledge" (2010)	"Vortex" (2011)

"Pledge" is a maxi-single featuring a winter ballad by the Japanese rock band the Gazette. It was released on December 15, 2010, in two editions; the "Optical Impression" edition, "Auditory Impression" edition. The first edition has two types, A and B. Type A includes two songs "Pledge" and "The True Murderous Intent", and a DVD containing the music video and making for the song "Pledge". Type B also includes two songs, and a DVD which contains three songs of their latest concert. The second edition comes with a bonus track "Voiceless Fear. This is winter ballad song".

== Track listing ==
=== Pledge: Optical Impression A ===
Disc one

1. "Pledge" - 6:04
2. "The True Murderous Intent" - 3:22

Disc two (DVD)

1. "Pledge: Music Clip + Making"

=== Pledge: Optical Impression B ===
Disc one

1. "Pledge" - 6:04
2. "The True Murderous Intent" - 3:22

Disc two - Tour10 Nameless Liberty Six Bullets-01- 2010.7.22 at Nippon Budokan (日本武道館) (3 songs)" (DVD)

1. "Shiver"
2. "Discharge"
3. "Swallowtail on the Death Valley"

=== Pledge: Auditory Impression ===
1. "Pledge" - 6:04
2. "The True Murderous Intent" - 3:22
3. "Voiceless Fear" - 5:16

== Notes ==
- The PV to "Pledge" was released a few weeks before its initial release.
- The single reached a peak mark of #2 on the Japanese Oricon Weekly Charts.
