= Gama (EP) =

Gama (蛾蟇)

EP by The Gazette
- Released: August 3, 2005; 20 years ago November 23, 2005; 20 years ago (Re-release)
- Recorded: Studio Moopies
- Genre: Alternative rock; nu metal
- Length: 20:53
- Label: PS Company
- Producer: Tomomi Ozaki (PS Company)

The Gazette chronology
Disorder (2004)	Gama (蛾蟇) (2005)	Nil (2006)

Gama (蛾蟇) is an EP released by Japanese rock band The Gazette on August 3, 2005. The first press edition came in a digipack form.

== Track listing ==
All lyrics are written by Ruki; all music is composed by the Gazette.

No.	Title	Length
1.	"anagra[SE]" (あなぐら; anagura "cellar")	1:09
2.	"COCKROACH"	3:57
3.	"Last bouquet"	6:37
4.	"Katherine in the trunk"	4:43
5.	"Sugar Pain"	4:25

== Personnel ==
- Ruki — Vocals
- Uruha — Lead guitar
- Aoi — Rhythm guitar
- Reita — Bass
- Kai — Drums

== Notes ==
- Gama was re-released in 2005
- The music video for "COCKROACH" was released long after the release of Gama on the Film Bug 1 music video collection.
