= Leech (song) =

Single by The Gazette

from the album Dim
- Released: November 12, 2008
- Genre: Nu metal
- Label: King Records
- Songwriters: Ruki, GazettE

The Gazette singles chronology
"Guren" (2008)	"Leech" (2008)	"Distress and Coma" (2009)

"Leech" is the 14th maxi-single by Japanese rock band the Gazette. It was released on November 12, 2008, in two editions; the "Optical Impression" edition and the "Auditory Impression" edition. The first includes the songs "Leech" and "Distorted Daytime"- it also includes a DVD containing the music video for the song "Leech". The second comes with a bonus track, "Hole".

== Track listing ==
=== Leech: Optical Impression- ===
Disk one

1. "Leech" - 4:13
2. "Distorted Daytime" - 3:52

Disc two (DVD)

1. "Leech: Music Clip" – 4:31

=== Leech: Auditory Impression ===
1. "Leech" - 4:13
2. "Distorted daytime" - 3:52
3. "Hole" – 3:13

== Note ==
- The single reached a peak mark of #2 on the Japanese Oricon Weekly Charts.
