= Nil (album) =

Studio album by the Gazette
- Released: February 8, 2006
- Studio: Studio Moopies
- Genre: Alternative rock; nu metal; funk rock
- Length: 55:56
- Label: King Records

The Gazette chronology
Gama (2005)	Nil (2006)	Dainihon Itangeishateki... (2006)

Singles from Nil
- 1. "Cassis" Released: December 6, 2005

Nil (Nameless Liberty Underground) (commonly known simply as Nil) is the second studio album released by Japanese rock band the Gazette. It was released on February 8, 2006, by King Records in Japan. It was also the first album by the Gazette to be released in Europe on May 30, 2006, by CLJ Records, and later re-released in Europe and North America on July 17, 2015, by JPU Records. The album reached the 10th position at the Japanese Oricon charts.

== Track listing ==
CD

All music by the Gazette and all lyrics by Ruki.

1. "The End" – 2:11
2. "Nausea & Shudder" – 6:07
3. "Bath Room" – 5:06
4. "Maggots" – 2:48
5. "Namaatatakai Ame to Zaratsuita Jōnetsu" (生暖かい雨とざらついた情熱; Lukewarm Rain and Rough Passion) – 3:04
6. "D.L.N" – 6:11
7. "Shadow VI II I" – 4:16
8. "Baretta" (バレッタ) – 5:44
9. "Cassis" – 6:44
10. "Silly God Disco" – 3:57
11. "Discharge" – 3:26
12. "Taion" (体温; Body Temperature) – 6:17

DVD (Limited version bonus)

1. "Shadow VI II I" – 4:16

== Notes ==
- The limited edition of Nil was housed in a soft case and came with the music video for Shadow VI II I.
- "Discharge" is printed in the lyric booklet, but the lyrics are scribbled over.
