= Shiver (The Gazette song) =

Single by The Gazette

from the album Toxic
- Released: July 21, 2010
- Genre: Alternative metal
- Label: Sony Music Records
- Songwriter(s): Matusmoto Akihiko

The Gazette singles chronology
"Before I Decay" (2009)	"Shiver" (2010)	"Red" (2010)

"Shiver" is a maxi-single by the Japanese rock band, The Gazette. It was released on July 21, 2010 in three editions; the "Optical Impression" edition, "Auditory Impression" edition, and "Kuroshitsuji II: Limited Edition", the first coming with a DVD containing the music video and making for the song "Shiver", and the second with a bonus track, and the third which contains the TV version of the song and the DVD which is the opening clip.

== Track listing ==
=== Shiver: Optical Impression- ===
Disk one

1. "Shiver" - 4:10
2. "Hesitating Means Death" - 3:38

Disc two (DVD)

1. "Shiver: Music Clip + Making" – 8:38

=== Shiver: Auditory Impression ===
1. "Shiver" - 4:10
2. "Hesitating Means Death" - 3:38
3. "Naraku" (奈落) – 4:16

=== Kuroshitsuji II: Limited Edition ===
Disk one

1. "Shiver" - 4:10
2. "Shiver TV version" - 1:30

Disc two (DVD)

1. "Kuroshitsuji Opening Video"
