= Distress and Coma =

- Optical Impression

Single by The Gazette

from the album Dim
- Released: March 25, 2009
- Genre: Rock/metal
- Length: 9 min (Optical Impression); 13 min (Auditory Impression)
- Label: King Records (JP)
- Songwriter(s): The Gazette

The Gazette singles chronology
| "Leech" (2008) | "Distress and Coma" (2009) | "Before I Decay" (2009) |

"Distress and Coma" is the 15th maxi-single by The Gazette. The single comes in two different types: the Optical Impression and Auditory Impression, the first contains a DVD with the music video for the song "Distress and Coma", and the latter comes with a bonus track instead. In accordance with the release of the single, The Gazette hosted a special event which a lucky purchaser got to attend.

== Track listing ==
=== Distress and Coma: Optical Impression ===
Disc one (CD)
| No. | Title | Length |
|---|---|---|
| 1. | "Distress and Coma" | 5:20 |
| 2. | "Headache Man" | 3:54 |
| Total length: | | 9 minutes |

Disc two (DVD)
| No. | Title | Length |
|---|---|---|
| 1. | "Distress and Coma" (Music Clip and Making) |

=== Distress and Coma: Auditory Impression ===
Disc one (CD)
| No. | Title | Length |
|---|---|---|
| 1. | "Distress and Coma" | 5:20 |
| 2. | "Headache Man" | 3:54 |
| 3. | "Without a Trace" | 4:17 |
| Total length: | | 13 minutes |
