= Yokosuka Arts Theatre =

Yokosuka Arts Theatre 横須賀芸術劇場
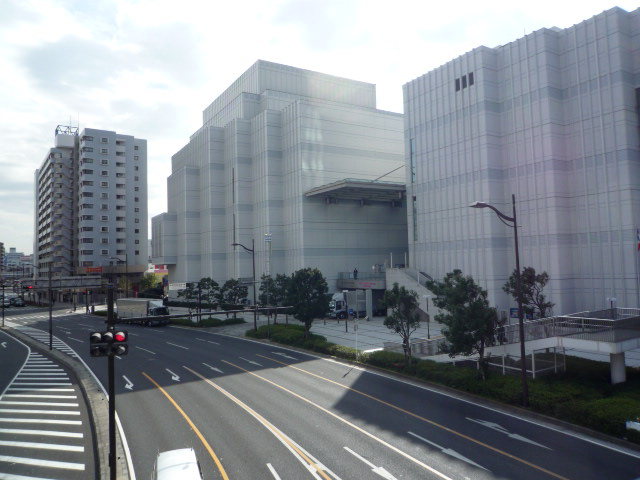
- Bay Square Yokosuka

General information
- Location: 3-27 Honmachi, Yokosuka, Kanagawa, Japan
- Coordinates: 35°16′52″N 139°39′47″E
- Opened: February 1994

Design and construction
- Architect: Kenzo Tange
- Other designers: Nagata Acoustics

Website
- Hompepage (Jp)

References
- Factsheet

Yokosuka Arts Theatre (横須賀芸術劇場, Yokosuka Geijutsu Gekijō) is part of the mixed-use Bay Square complex in Yokosuka, Kanagawa Prefecture, Japan. It opened in 1994. The horseshoe-shaped theatre seats 1,806 and there is a smaller hall, the Yokosuka Bayside Pocket, with a capacity of 600. The Bay Square complex is by Kenzo Tange, with acoustical design of the halls by Nagata Acoustics.
