= Guren (song) =

Single by The Gazette

from the album Dim
- Released: February 13, 2008
- Genre: Alternative rock
- Label: King Records
- Songwriter(s): The Gazette

The Gazette singles chronology
"Hyena" (2007)	"Guren" (2008)	"Leech" (2008)

"Guren" is the 13th maxi-single by the Japanese rock band, The Gazette. It was released on February 13, 2008 in two editions; the "Optical Impression" edition, "Auditory Impression" edition. The first includes the songs "Guren" and "Kugutsue"- it also includes a DVD containing the music video for the song "Guren". The second comes with a bonus track, "Kyomu No Owari Hakozume No Mokuji".

== Track listing ==
=== Guren: Optical Impression- ===
Disk one

1. "Guren" (Crimson Lotus)- 5:24
2. "Kugutsue" (Drawing of Puppet) - 4:39

Disc two (DVD)

1. "Guren: Music Clip" – 5:52

=== Guren: Auditory Impression ===
1. "Guren" (Crimson Lotus) - 5:24
2. "Kugutsue" (Drawing of Puppet) - 4:39
3. "Kyomu No Owari Hakodzume No Mokushi" – 4:36

== Note ==
- The single reached a peak mark of #3 on the Japanese Oricon Weekly Charts.
