= Toxic (The Gazette album) =

Studio album by The Gazette
- Released: October 5, 2011
- Genre: Nu metal; industrial metal; metalcore; alternative rock
- Length: 50:28
- Language: Japanese, English
- Label: Sony Music Records

The Gazette chronology
Dim (2009)	Toxic (2011)	Division (2012)

Singles from Toxic
- 1. "Shiver" Released: July 21, 2010; 2. "Red" Released: September 22, 2010; 3. "Pledge" Released: December 15, 2010; 4. "Vortex" Released: May 25, 2011

Toxic is the fifth studio album by Japanese rock band the Gazette. It was released on October 5, 2011 in Japan and includes four singles: "Shiver", "Red", "Pledge", and "Vortex". The album scored number 3 on the Oricon Daily Charts and number 6 on the Oricon Weekly Charts, selling 25,412 copies in its first week.

== Track listing ==
1. "Infuse Into" – 1:23
2. "Venomous Spider's Web" – 3:50
3. "Sludgy Cult" – 3:14
4. "Red" – 3:24
5. "Suicide Circus" – 4:07
6. "Shiver" – 4:11
7. "My Devil On The Bed" – 3:23
8. "Untitled" – 4:21
9. "Pledge" – 6:05
10. "Ruthless Deed" – 3:37
11. "Psychopath" – 3:04
12. "Vortex" – 4:05
13. "Tomorrow Never Dies" – 4:08
14. "Omega" – 1:37

DVD (limited edition only)

1. "The Suicide Circus" Music Clip
2. "The Suicide Circus" Making Clip

== Notes ==
- The first album release to use all English names in the album.
