= Dim (album) =

Studio album by the Gazette
- Released: July 15, 2009
- Genre: Alternative metal
- Length: 59:33
- Label: King Records

The Gazette chronology
Stacked Rubbish (2007)	Dim (2009)	Toxic (2011)

Singles from Dim
- 1. "Guren" Released: February 13, 2008; 2. "Leech" Released: November 12, 2008; 3. "Distress and Coma" Released: March 25, 2009

Professional ratings
Review scores
Source	Rating
AllMusic	4/5 stars
Neo Magazine	4.5/5 stars

Dim is the fourth studio album by Japanese rock band the Gazette. It was released on July 15, 2009, in Japan. It includes the three lead up singles: "Guren", "Leech", and "Distress and Coma". The album scored number two on the Oricon Daily Charts and number five on the Oricon Weekly Charts, selling 37,797 copies in its first week.

== Track listing ==
All lyrics are written by Ruki

No.	Title	Writer(s)	Length
1.	"Hakuri (「剥離」; Detachment)"	the GazettE	1:43
2.	"The Invisible Wall"	the GazettE	4:34
3.	"A Moth Under the Skin"	Aoi	2:57
4.	"Leech"	the GazettE	4:15
5.	"Nakigahara (泣ヶ原; Crying Fields)"	the GazettE	7:19
6.	"Erika (「エ リ カ」)"	the GazettE	0:53
7.	"HEADACHE MAN (Originally B-side for Distress and Coma"	the GazettE	3:54
8.	"Guren (紅蓮; Crimson Lotus)"	the GazettE	5:40
9.	"Shikyū (「子宮」; Womb)"	the GazettE	0:43
10.	"13STAIRS[-]1"	Uruha	5:03
11.	"Distress and Coma"	the GazettE	5:15
12.	"Kanshoku (「感触」; Feeling)"	the GazettE	0:52
13.	"Shiroki Yūutsu (白き優鬱; White Depression)"	Aoi	4:29
14.	"In the Middle of Chaos"	the GazettE	3:02
15.	"Mōrō (「朦朧」; Dim)"	the GazettE	0:23
16.	"Ogre"	the GazettE	3:14
17.	"Dim Scene"	Uruha	5:12

DVD (limited edition only)

1. "The Invisible Wall" Music Clip
2. "The Other Side of Dim" A collection of recording clips from the studio.

The Limited Edition sold at Tower Records also came packaged with a Car Bumper Sticker, 5 Postcards and a Poster
