= Cassis (song) =

- A-type

Single by The Gazette

from the album Nil
- Released: December 6, 2005 (A & B types); January 1, 2006 (Regular type)
- Genre: Progressive rock, funk rock, alternative rock
- Label: King Records

The Gazette singles chronology
| "Dainippon Itangeishateki..." (2005) | "Cassis" (2005) | "Regret" (2006) |

"Cassis" is a maxi-single and major label debut by The Gazette released on King Records, initially released as an A-type and a B-type, the A-type containing a music video for the song "Cassis", the B-type containing a bonus track. After these had both gone out of print, a regular type was released, containing only the A-side song and the B-side song.

== Track listing ==
=== Cassis type A ===
Disc one

1. "Cassis" - 6:44
2. "Toguro" (蜷局; Coil) - 4:08

Disc two (DVD)

1. "Cassis" - 6:44

=== Cassis type B ===
1. "Cassis" - 6:44
2. "Toguro" (蜷局; Coil) - 4:08
3. "Bite to All" - 3:25

=== Cassis regular type ===
1. "Cassis" - 6:44
2. "Toguro" (蜷局; Coil) - 4:08

== Notes ==
- "Cassis" is also featured on the album Nil, released a few months after this single.
- The music video of Cassis was filmed in Riegersburg, Austria.
- The single reached a peak mark of #6 on the Japanese Oricon Weekly Charts.
