= Dogma (The Gazette album) =

Studio album by the Gazette
- Released: August 26, 2015
- Genre: Gothic metal
- Length: 50:38
- Languages: Japanese, English
- Labels: Sony Music Records Japan; Sony Music; JPU Records

The Gazette chronology
Beautiful Deformity (2013)	Dogma (2015)	Ninth (2018)

Dogma (stylized as DOGMA in Japan) is the eighth studio album by Japanese visual kei rock band the Gazette, released on August 26, 2015, in Japan and September 4, 2015, in the US by Sony Music and October 2, 2015, in the UK, Europe and Russia by JPU Records.

The album scored number 2 on the Oricon Daily Charts on its day of release and number 3 on the Oricon Weekly Charts, selling 18,102 copies in its first week.

The GazettE released its eighth studio album on August 26th, 2016. Titled 'DOGMA', the band does with it everything on a grand and beautiful scale! The record is incorporated within the framework of a global conceptual scheme named 'Project: Dark Age' which marks the thirteenth anniversary of the combo. The project, which was launched over the course of March 2015, is being developed purposely through a range of thirteen sub-projects represented graphically by a logo, a ring-shape dodecagon. The circle added to the twelve-sided polygon symbolizes the thirteenth line. The graphic choice, driven by the age of the band, is without a doubt well-thought, since a twelve-star polygon is culturally linked to the Earthly Branches, an ancient means through which time is measured (duration, age). These sub-projects, commonly titled 'movement' — the notion of time is a corollary of the notion of movement — yet dissociated by ordinal numbers, are then revealed in further details in dribs and drabs. Album 'DOGMA', being the very first movement (located at the far north on the logo), is the core piece of the puzzle which encompasses other audiovisual and text elements created in association with 18 artists (HERE). Music-wise, the album is a perfect blend of Slipknot's Iowa for its heaviness, Dir En Grey's Dum Spiro Spero for its atypical pattern and Marilyn Manson's Holy Wood for its esoteric spirit.

== Track listing ==
=== Limited edition ===
All lyrics are written by Ruki; all music is composed by the Gazette except where noted.

Disc one – CD
No.	Title	Music	Length
1.	"Nihil"		1:16
2.	"Dogma"		4:28
3.	"Rage"		3:27
4.	"Dawn"		3:50
5.	"Deracine"	Uruha	3:44
6.	"Bizarre"		3:31
7.	"Wasteland"	Aoi	3:19
8.	"Incubus"		3:37
9.	"Lucy"		3:22
10.	"Grudge"	Aoi	4:04
11.	"Paralysis"	Uruha	3:19
12.	"Deux"		3:59
13.	"Blemish"		3:25
14.	"Ominous"		5:18

Disc two – DVD
No.	Title	Length
1.	"Dogma (Music Video)"	4:41

Disc three – DVD
No.	Title	Length
1.	"DOCUMENTARY OF [-13-] AT 日本武道館"	16:51
2.	"Deux (Music Video)"	3:59
3.	"Ominous (Lyric Video)"	5:20
4.	"Making of Dogma MV"	4:20
5.	"Trailer Collection"	3:50

=== Regular edition ===
All lyrics are written by Ruki; all music is composed by the Gazette.

No.	Title	Music	Length
1.	"Nihil"		1:16
2.	"Dogma"		4:28
3.	"Rage"		3:27
4.	"Dawn"		3:50
5.	"Deracine"	Uruha	3:44
6.	"Bizarre"		3:31
7.	"Wasteland"	Aoi	3:19
8.	"Incubus"		3:37
9.	"Lucy"		3:22
10.	"Grudge"	Aoi	4:04
11.	"Paralysis"	Uruha	3:19
12.	"Deux"		3:59
13.	"Blemish"		3:25
14.	"Ominous"		5:18

- Mastered by Ted Jensen at Sterling Sound
