= JPU Records =

British record label

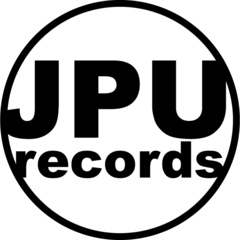
- Founded: 2012
- Genre: Rock, heavy metal, J pop
- Country of origin: UK
- Location: London
- Official website: jpurecords.com

JPU Records is a British record label formed in 2012, which specializes in handling international releases by Japanese artists. Notable acts on JPU's roster include The Gazette, Band-Maid, Lovebites, and Nemophila.

== History ==
The label was established in 2012. Its first release was Division by popular Japanese visual kei rock band The Gazette, followed by the 2013 album Beautiful Deformity. The label began to release albums by other Japanese acts, including I'mperfect by Ling Tosite Sigure, Weeeeeeeeee!!! by Polysics, and Embrace by Boom Boom Satellites. In 2016 they announced the signing of rock quintet Band-Maid and pop singer Amatsuki, giving the two acts their UK debuts at MCM London Comic Con in May of that year.

== Current roster ==
JPU Records has released albums by the following artists:

- Aldious
- Amatsuki
- Asian Kung-Fu Generation
- Band-Maid
- Back-On
- Bed In
- blank paper
- Boom Boom Satellites (defunct)
- Buck-Tick
- Broken by the Scream
- Crystal Lake
- Dempagumi.inc
- Doll$Boxx
- Elfriede
- Ena Fujita
- FEMM
- Flow
- The Gazette
- Kari Band
- Kemuri
- Ladybaby
- Lie and a Chameleon
- Ling Tosite Sigure
- Lovebites
- Lyrical School
- Man with a Mission
- Mary's Blood
- Moso Calibration
- Mutant Monster
- Nemophila
- Niji no Conquistador
- NoGoD
- One Eye Closed
- Passcode
- Polysics
- ROA
- ROS
- Scandal
- Sin Isomer
- Sokoninaru
- Spyair
- Sumire Uesaka
