= List of home video companies =

This is a list of notable home video companies in the business of producing and marketing pre-recorded cassettes and discs of various formats for home video.

== Major home video companies ==
=== Skydance Corporation ===
==== Paramount Pictures ====
- Paramount Home Entertainment (1976–present)
  - Nickelodeon Home Entertainment (1993–present)
  - MTV Home Entertainment (1994–present)
  - Comedy Central Home Entertainment (1998–present)
  - PBS Home Video (2004–2011)
  - BET Home Entertainment (2007–present)
  - Miramax Home Entertainment (1992–2010)
    - Miramax/Dimension Home Entertainment (1995–2006)
  - Republic Pictures Home Video (1985–1998)
    - NTA Home Entertainment (1983-1985)
    - Spotlite Video (1984–1986)
    - Worldvision Home Video (1983–1994)
  - DreamWorks Animation Home Entertainment (2006–2012)
  - CBS Home Entertainment (2007–present)
    - CBS Video Enterprises (1979–1982)
    - MGM/CBS Home Video (1980–1982)
    - CBS/Fox Video (1982–2001)
    - CBS Video (1980–2006)
    - CBS DVD (1999–present)

==== Warner Bros. Pictures ====
- Warner Bros. Home Entertainment (1978–present)
  - New Line Home Entertainment (2001–2010)
    - New Line Home Video (1991–2001)
    - Infinifilm (2002–2007)
  - HBO Home Entertainment (2010–2020)
    - Thorn EMI Video (1981–1985)
    - Thorn EMI/HBO Video (1985–1986)
    - HBO/Cannon Video (1986–1987)
    - HBO Video (1987–2010)
  - Karl-Lorimar Home Video (1985–1989)
  - Turner Home Entertainment (1986–1997)
    - Hanna-Barbera Home Video (1988–1991)
  - WarnerVision Entertainment (1995–2002)
    - KidVision (1990–2004)
  - Discovery Home Entertainment (1987–present)
    - TLC Video (1972–present)
    - Animal Planet Video (1983–present)

=== The Walt Disney Company ===
==== Walt Disney Studios ====
- Walt Disney Studios Home Entertainment (1978–2024)
  - Pixar (1996–present)
  - ABC Signature (2007–present)
  - ABC Video (1997–1999)
  - Buena Vista Home Entertainment (1983–2010, remains in use as a label in other countries)
  - Touchstone Home Entertainment (1984–2016)
  - Hollywood Pictures Home Entertainment (1990–2007)
  - DIC Toon-Time Video (1994–2000)
  - ESPN Home Entertainment (1997–present)
  - Freeform (2007–present)
  - Jim Henson Video (1993–1996)
  - Marvel Studios (2012–present)
  - Lucasfilm (2014–present)
  - Miramax Home Entertainment (1994–2010)
    - Miramax/Dimension Home Entertainment (1995–2006)
    - Dimension Home Entertainment (1995–2005)

==== Twentieth Century Studios ====
- 20th Century Home Entertainment (2019–present)
  - 20th Century Animation (1998-present)
    - Blue Sky Studios (2002–2023)
    - Magnetic Video (1968–1982)
    - CBS/Fox Video (1982–2001)
      - Playhouse Video (1985–1991)
    - Key Video/Key DVD (1984–2005)
    - FoxVideo (1991–1998)
    - 20th Century Fox Home Entertainment (1995–2020)
      - DreamWorks Animation (2013–2017)
      - New World Video (1984–1989)
      - MTM Home Video (1992–1997)

=== Sony ===
==== Sony Pictures ====
- Sony Pictures Home Entertainment (2004–present)
  - Sony Video Software (1981–1992)
  - Columbia Pictures Home Entertainment (1978–1982)
  - RCA/Columbia Pictures Home Video (1982–1991)
  - Columbia TriStar Home Video (1991–2001)
  - Columbia TriStar Home Entertainment (2001–2004)
  - Funimation/Crunchyroll, LLC (1994–present)
    - Nozomi Entertainment (1987–present)
- Sony Music Entertainment (1991–2005, 2008–present)
  - Sony BMG Music Entertainment (2004–2009)
    - BMG Video (1987–2008)
      - BMG Kidz (1990–2008)
    - Sony Music Video Enterprises (1991–2005)
    - Sony Wonder (1992–2020)

=== NBCUniversal (Comcast) ===
==== Universal Pictures ====
- Universal Pictures Home Entertainment (1996–present)
  - MCA DiscoVision (1977–1981)
  - MCA Videocassette, Inc. (1980–1983)
  - MCA Videodisc (1981–1983)
  - MCA Home Video (1983–1990)
  - MCA/Universal Home Video (1990–1996)
  - HIT Entertainment (2014–2017)/Mattel Creations (2016–2019)/Mattel Television (2019–present)
  - Entertainment One (2019–2023)
  - NBC Home Video (1981–2000)
  - USA Home Entertainment (1999–2002)
    - PolyGram Video (1982–1999)
  - Studio Distribution Services (2021–present)
  - Universal Sony Pictures Home Entertainment Australia
  - DreamWorks Home Entertainment (1997–present, minority owner)
  - DreamWorks Animation Home Entertainment (2004–present)
    - Golden Book Video (1985–1996)/Golden Books Family Entertainment (1996-2001)/Classic Media (2000–2012)/DreamWorks Classics (2012–present)

=== Lionsgate Studios Corporation ===
Note: Additional video companies whose libraries have been acquired by Lionsgate will be marked with an (*) in the "Other Companies" section; as documented in the Lionsgate Home Entertainment and Anchor Bay Entertainment articles or external references.

- Lionsgate Home Entertainment (1999–2024)
  - Summit Entertainment (1991–present)
  - Artisan Entertainment (1983–2005)
    - Family Home Entertainment (1980–2007)
    - Family Home Entertainment Kids (1998–2004)
    - FHE Pictures (2002)
    - Live Entertainment
    - International Video Entertainment
    - Carolco Home Video (1990–1995)
    - Avid Home Entertainment (1991–1998)
    - Vestron Video (1982–1998)
      - Children's Video Library (1982–1987)
      - Lightning Video (1982–1987)
  - HIT Entertainment (2008–2014)
- Starz Home Entertainment (2007-2008, 2016–2017)
  - Anchor Bay Entertainment (1995–2017)
    - Starmaker Entertainment (1988–1998)
    - Video Treasures (1985–1998)
      - MNTEX Entertainment (198?–199?)
      - Teal Entertainment (19??-199?)
      - Strand VCI Entertainment (1989-1992)/Strand Home Video (1992–1995)
      - Burbank Video (1989–1995, second incarnation)
        - SRO Video (1981–1982)/Opening Night Productions (1982–1984)/Curtain Call Video (1984–1985)/Viking Video Classics (1985–1989)/Troy Gold (1988–1989)
        - Burbank Video (1984-1988, first incarnation)
- Entertainment One (2023–present)

=== Amazon MGM Studios (Amazon) ===
- MGM Home Entertainment (1998–present)
  - MGM Home Video (1978–1980)
  - MGM/CBS Home Video (1980–1982)
  - MGM/UA Home Video (1982–1998)
  - MGM/UA Home Entertainment (1998-2005)
  - UA (Specials)
  - Cannon Video (1985–1995)
  - Samuel Goldwyn Home Entertainment (1982–1997)
  - Orion Home Video (1987–1998)
    - Filmways Home Video (1988–1989)
    - Streamline Video (1990–1994)

=== Warner Music Group ===
- Warner Music Vision (1990–2006)
  - BodyVision (1993–2002)
  - Warner Reprise Video (1986–present)
  - Rhino Entertainment (1978–present)

== Others ==
- Heron Communications
  - Media Home Entertainment (1978–1993)*
    - Hi-Tops Video (1984–1993)*
    - The Nostalgia Merchant (1978–1989)*
    - Fox Hills Video (1986–1989)*
- PBS Distribution (1977–present)
- 2 Entertain (1984–present)
- DIC Home Entertainment (2001–2009, distributed by Lionsgate Home Entertainment before 2002, Sterling Entertainment Group between 2002 and 2006, and NCircle Entertainment after 2006)
  - DIC Video (1987–1994, distributed by GoodTimes Home Video and Simon Marketing from 1989 to 1992, Buena Vista Home Video from 1993 to 1994 and Golden Book Video from 1987 to 1989)
  - DIC Toon-Time Video (1992–2001, distributed by BMG Video before 1993 and Buena Vista Home Video after 1993)
- WGBH Boston Video (1980–present)
- Random House Home Video (1985-2006)
- Golden Books Family Entertainment (1985–2001)
- Master Arts Video
- Wizard Video (1980–present)
- Viz Video (1993–present)
- HIT Entertainment (1996–present in the United Kingdom, 1998–2016 in the United States)
  - Lyrick Studios (1988–2001)
- Shout! Factory (2002–present)
- Geffen Home Video (1992–1998)
- NCircle Entertainment (2006–present)
- Genius Products (1996–2011)
- NoShame
- Hemdale Home Video (1991–1995)
- Fries Home Video
- Maxell
- The Criterion Collection
- Image Entertainment
- Entertainment One (2005–present)
- Vivendi Entertainment (2004–2013)
- Time Life Video
- New Video Group (1991–present)
- Monterey Home Video (Caballero-era library owned by Lionsgate)
- Broad Green Pictures
- Prism Entertainment (1983–1997)
- Academy Entertainment (1984-1994)
- Eskay Video Pvt. Ltd.

=== Public domain companies ===
- Simitar Entertainment (1985–2000)
- GoodTimes Entertainment (1984-2005)/GT Media (2003–2009)
  - Kids Klassics Home Video (1985–1996)
  - GTK, Inc. (1987–1990)
  - California Video Distributors (1984–1986)
- Sterling Entertainment Group (1992–2006)
  - VidAmerica (1979–1992)
  - UAV Corporation (1984–1998)
  - Celebrity Home Entertainment (1987–2003)
    - Just for Kids Home Video (1987–2003)
    - Unicon Communications (1989–1992)
- Gorgon Video
- Vee-Jay Video Products (1986–1989)
- Concord Video (1985–1987)
- Burbank Video (1984–1995)*
  - Troy Gold (1988–1989)*
- Diamond Entertainment Corporation (1991–present)
  - Trans-Atlantic Video (1985–1991)
- Madacy Entertainment (1993–2007)
- Echo Bridge Home Entertainment (2001–2021)
  - Platinum Disc Corporation (1995–2006)
- MPI Home Video (1984–present)
- Alpha Video (1985–1991)

=== Adult video companies ===
- Caballero Home Video (1981–1989)

=== Outside of the United States ===
Argentina

- LK-TEL
- Gativideo
- Argentina Video Home
- Transmundo Home Video
- Transeuropa Video Entertainment
- Teleargentina Division Video
- Live Video
- Lucian Films
- Plus Video
- American Video
- Emerald
- Tauro Video
- Radiocom Video
- Target Video Home
- Madison Video Home
- FAX Video Design

Australia

- Communications and Entertainment Limited (Early 1980s-Mid 1990s, was originally Publishing and Broadcasting Video Distribution)
- GO Video (Early-Mid 1980s)
- Starbase Video (Early-Mid 1980s)
- King of Video (Early-Mid 1980s)
- Video Classics (Early-Mid 1980s)
- Thorn/EMI Video
- Thorn/EMI HBO Video
- Platinum Video (Mid-1980s)
- Delta Home Video (Mid-1980s)
- Prestige Video (Mid-1980s)
- Palace Home Video (Mid-Late 1980s)
- Roadshow Entertainment (1995–)
  - Roadshow Home Video (1982–1995)
- Intervision (Early-Mid 1980s)
- ABC Video (1984–)
- Family Home Entertainment (1985–1991)
- Showcase Video (Mid-1980s)
- GL Video (Early-1980s)
- Vestron (Mid-Late 1980s)
- Box Office Int. Video (Mid-1980s)
- RCA/Columbia Pictures/Hoyts Video (Mid-Late 1980s)
- Videoscope (Early 1980s)
- Syme Home Video (Mid 1980s)
- Electric (Blue) Video (although the company was actually UK-based)
- Sports World Cinema
- VCL Video
- Movies at Midnight
- Seven Keys Video
- Screen Time Entertainment (division of CBS-Fox Video in Australia)
- Pink Video
- Rigby-CIC Video
- Merlin Video
- Playaround Video
- Star Video
- Australian Video
- Madman Entertainment
- 21st Century Pictures
- Electric Blue

Bulgaria

- Alexandra Video
- May Star Film
- Audio Video Orpheus
- IP Video
- Multi Video Center
- Tandem Video
- Bulgarian Video

Brazil

- America Video
- Poletel Video
- China Video
- LK-TEL Video
- Abril Video
- Globo Marcas (Grupo Globo)

Canada

- A and Y Productions (2003–2006)
- The ABM Group (1989–1994) (Canadian counterpart of Starmaker Entertainment)

Japan

- Bandai Namco Filmworks

Mexico

- Televisa Home Entertainment (TelevisaUnivision)
- Video Emoción (1980s-Early 1990s)
- VideoVisa

The Netherlands

- Converge Video (1980s)
- Video Screen
- Eagle 6 Video
- Bridge Entertainment DVD
- Classic Video Movies
- Video Garant
- European Video Corporation

Norway

- ABC Video (1980s)
- Big Partner (1980s)
- CCV (Club Consult Video) (1980s)
- C.P. Entertainment (1980s)
- Fram Film (1980s)
- HVC Video Vision AS (1980s)
- Intervideo (1980s)
- In Video (1980s)
- JEL Video (1980s)
- Mayco AS (1980s)
- Nord Video (1980s)
- Novio AS (Later renamed "Nye Novio") (1980s)
- OVC (Oslo Video Center) (1980s)
- Panorama (1980s)
- Sandrew Metronome
- Screen Entertainment (1980s)
- VCM (1980s)
- Videohuset (1980s)

Philippines

- C-Interactive Digital Entertainment
- Magnavision Home Video
- Solar Entertainment Corporation
- Warner Home Video Philippines
- Star Home Video
- Regal Home Video (Regal International Inc.)
- Trigon Video
- Ivory Music and Video
- Paragon Home Video
- Synergy Home Entertainment
- Aquarius Records
- Viva Video
- GMA Music and Home Video

Russia

- 20th Century Fox CIS (2006–2015)
- Big Plan (Russian: Крупный план) (1988–)
- CP Digital (until 2012 renamed as «CP Distribution») (2000–2015)
- Gemini Film (2000–2007)
- Most Video (1999–2005)
- Premier Video Film (1996–2005)
- Premier Multimedia (2001–2005)
- Pyramid Home Video (1997–2008)
- New Disk (Russian: Новый Диск)/ND Play (2000s-)
- Union Video (Russian: Союз Видео) (1988–2012)
- VideoServis (1994–2015)
- Varus Video (1992–2000)
- West Multimedia/West Video (1994–2015)
- Walt Disney Company CIS (2008–)
- Universal Pictures Rus (2005–2011)
- Lazer Video

Portugal

- RTP Home Video
- Class Vidéo (????)
- Club Privé Vidéo (1992–present)
- The Video Bancorp
- NOS
- LNKVideo
- Cinemateca Portuguesa
- PRIS Audiovisuais
- Skookum Films

Saudi Arabia

- ALMONTAGE Entertainment (2009)
- Video Master (1990s)

Singapore

- Videovan Entertainment (1997–2011)
- Poh Kim Video (????)
- Melovision Trading Corporation

South Africa

- Nu Metro Home Entertainment (1987–2014)
- Ster-Kinekor Entertainment (1983-2018)

South Korea

- Kwang Young Products
- Home Game
- Korea Media
- Cinematown
- CJ Entertainment (CJ ENM)
- Lotte Entertainment
- Next Entertainment World
- SBS Contents Hub
- KBS Media

Spain

- Filmax Home Video (1988–present)
- Video Diversíon (Mid-1980s)
- Lauren Films Video (1980s-Present)
- Quintavisión (5A Vision)
- SAV
- Travelling Video (Mid-1980s-Early-1990s)
- Vadimon Video
- Vídeo Peques (1984-1997)
- Viva Home Video (1980s)
- Video Colección (1990s, Spain's version of The Video Collection/Strand-VCI Entertainment/Strand Home Video)

Sweden

- Baroness VideoVision
- International Promotions, Inc.
- PRT Elektronik
- Trix Videofilmer
- Video Invest
- Videce Videocentralen
- Mariann Video
- Esselte Video
- Walthers Video
- Sandrew Metronome

Turkey

- Alparslan Video

United Arab Emirates

- Hobo Collection (United Arab Emirates) (in PAL Standard (HI-FI Stereo) (1986–present)
- 20th Century Studios Home Entertainment UAE (1986–present)
- Buena Vista Home Entertainment UAE (1986-2028)
  - Walt Disney Studios Home Entertainment UAE (1986–present)
  - Touchstone Home Entertainment UAE (1986–2017)
  - Hollywood Pictures Home Video UAE (1986–2007)
- CIC Video UAE
- Columbia TriStar Home Entertainment UAE (1986–2005)
- DreamWorks Home Entertainment UAE (1999–2011)
  - DreamWorks Animation Home Entertainment UAE (1999–2014)
- MGM/UA Home Entertainment UAE (1986–present)
- Paramount Pictures Home Entertainment UAE (1986–present)
- Sony Pictures Home Entertainment UAE (2005–present)
- Turner Home Entertainment UAE (1995–1999)
  - Hanna-Barbera Home Video UAE (1995–1999)
- Universal Home Entertainment UAE (1986–present)
- Warner Bros. Home Entertainment UAE (1986–present)
  - Warner Bros. Family Entertainment UAE (1986–2009)

United Kingdom

- CIC Video (1980–1999)
- RCA/Columbia Pictures International Video (1982–1992)
- Vestron Video International (1987–1991)
- Abbey Home Media Group (2002–2020)
  - Abbey Home Entertainment/Tempo Video
- Video Gems (1986–1996)
- Guild Home Video (1980–1997)
- RPTA Video (1981–1984)
- Thorn EMI Video UK (1981–1986)
  - Cannon Video UK (1986–1989)
- Telstar Home Entertainment (2000s)
- BBC Studios Home Entertainment (1980-)
  - 2 Entertain (2004–)
  - BBC Video (1980–2004)
  - Video Collection International (1984–2004)
    - Cinema Club
- Acorn Media
- HIT Entertainment (1997–2022)
- Metrodome Distribution (2003–2009)
- M.I.A. Video
- IMC Video LTD
- Pegasus Entertainment
- Castle Vision
- Screen Legends
- First Independent Films
- Braveworld Video
- Virgin Video
- Channel 5 Video
- ITV Studios Global Entertainment
  - Pickwick Video Group
  - Carlton Video (1995–2004)
  - Granada Ventures (2004–2006)
  - ITV DVD (2006–2009)
  - ITV Studios (2009–present)
- Entertainment in Video (EIV)
- Magical Video Movies (MVM)
- Dazzler Media
- Entertainment One (2007–2024)
  - Contender Entertainment Group (1994–2009)
    - Bonkers
    - Nippers
    - Kult TV/Kult Kidz
    - Rubber Duck Entertainment (2005–2009)
    - Medusa Video (1980s–2004)
    - Hong Kong Legends (1999–2007)
    - Premier Asia (2003-2008)
  - Momentum Pictures (2000–2013)
    - Momentum Asia
- First Choice Home Video
- Marshall Media (1931)
- Spirit Entertainment
- Fabulous Films
- Mediumrare Entertainment
- Kaleidoscope Home Entertainment
- Palace Video (Note: unrelated to the Australian company of the same name, this handled children's videos & horror movies)
- Signature Entertainment (2012–present)
- DD Video
- Replay Video
- Hokushin Video Movies
- Intervision
- Alpha Video
- Videomedia
- Skyline Video
- Prism Leisure Corporation
  - Odyssey Video
- Video Program Distribution
- Derann Video
- Vision Video LTD. (1993–2003)
  - Astrion (1995–1999)
- Cherrywood Entertainment
- LaserLight Digital
- CineHollywood
- Longman Video
- Thames Video

Venezuela

- Blancic Video
- Videorama
- Venevista Video
- Video-Rodven
- Gran Video
- Video Venus
- Videos De Venezuela
- Blue Diamond Video
- Intervideo
- Romy Video

== See also ==
- Home video
- Videocassette recorder
- Copyright law
- Video rental shop
- Category:Video
- Category:Direct-to-video film series
- Category:Home video companies of the United States
- Home cinema
