= Cell =

Cell most often refers to:

- Cell (biology), the functional basic unit of life
- Cellphone, a phone connected to a cellular network
- Clandestine cell, a penetration-resistant form of a secret or outlawed organization
- Electrochemical cell, a device used to convert chemical energy to electrical energy
- Prison cell, a room used to hold people in prisons

Cell may also refer to:

== Arts, entertainment, and media ==
=== Fictional entities ===
- Cell (comics), a Marvel comic book character
- Cell (Dragon Ball), a character in the manga series Dragon Ball

=== Literature ===
- Cell (novel), a 2006 horror novel by Stephen King
- "Cells", poem, about a hungover soldier in jail, by Rudyard Kipling
- The Cell (play), an Australian play by Robert Wales
- Consortium on Electronic Literature, a database of electronic literature

=== Music ===
- Cell (music), a small rhythmic and melodic design that can be isolated, or can make up one part of a thematic context
- Cell (American band)
- Cell (Japanese band)
- Cell (album), a 2004 album by Plastic Tree
- Cells, a 1998 album by Cex
- Cells, a 2012 album by Fake Blood
- "Cells", an art song composed by G. F. Cobb and named after the poem by Kipling
- "Cells", a song by Bloem de Ligny
- "Cells", a song by I Monster from the album Neveroddoreven
- "Cells", a song by The Servant
- The Cells, an American rock band
- "The Cell" (song), a 2006 song by Jandek

=== Other arts, entertainment, and media ===
- The Cell (film), a 2000 psychological thriller film starring Jennifer Lopez
- Cell (film), a 2016 film based on the Stephen King novel
- Animation cel, a transparent sheet on which objects are drawn or painted for traditional, hand-drawn animation
- "The Cell" (The Vampire Diaries), an episode of the TV series The Vampire Diaries
- "The Cell" (The Walking Dead), a 2016 television episode of The Walking Dead
- The Cell (BBC Four), Adam Rutherford's 3-part documentary series that aired on BBC Four
- The Cell, the original title of the TV series Sleeper Cell

== Groups of people ==
- Cell, a group of people in a cell group, a form of Christian church organization
- Cellular organizational structure, such as in business management

== Rooms ==
- Monastic cell, a small room, hut, or cave in which a religious recluse lives, alternatively the small precursor of a monastery with only a few monks or nuns

== Science, mathematics, and technology ==
=== Computing and telecommunications ===
- Cell (EDA), a term used in an electronic circuit design schematics
- Cell (processor), a multi-core processor architecture developed by Sony, Toshiba, and IBM
- Cell, a unit in a database table or spreadsheet, formed by the intersection of a row and a column
- Cell, in wireless local area networking standards (including Wi-Fi), a wireless connection within a limited area, referred to as a cell or Basic Service Set
- Cell, a fixed-length data frame used in the Asynchronous Transfer Mode protocol
- Cell (network), area of radio coverage in a cellular network
- Memory cell (computing), the basic unit of (volatile or non-volatile) computer memory

=== Mathematics ===
- Cell (geometry), a three-dimensional element, part of a higher-dimensional object
- Cell, an element of an abstract cell complex
- Cell, a basic unit of a cellular automaton
- Cell, an element of a CW complex
- Cell, a k-face of a simplicial complex

=== Other uses in science and technology ===
- Cell (journal), a scientific journal
- Cells (journal), a scientific journal
- Fuel cell, a device used to convert chemical energy from a fuel like hydrogen to electricity
- Galvanic cell or voltaic cell, a particular kind of electrochemical cell
- Photodetector, or photo cell, a sensor which detects light
- Solar cell, a component of photovoltaic systems used to convert the energy of light into electricity
- Storm cell, the smallest unit of a storm-producing system

== See also ==
- CEL (disambiguation)
- Cellular (disambiguation)
- Macrocell
