= Cels =

Cels may refer to:

- CelS, Cellulose 1,4-beta-cellobiosidase (reducing end), an enzyme
- CELS ratings, a supervisory rating system to classify a bank's overall condition
- HUGO Committee on Ethics, Law and Society (CELS) of the Human Genome Organisation
- Center for Legal and Social Studies (CELS), Argentine human rights organization presided by Horacio Verbitsky
- Cels (surname)
- Cels Piñol, Spanish cartoonist and illustrator, creator of Fanhunter cartoons
- Cels Gomis (1841 - 1915 ), Catalan folklorist and engineer .

== See also ==
- Cel (disambiguation)
