= Cellular =

Cellular may refer to:

- Cellular automaton, a model in discrete mathematics
- Cell biology, the evaluation of cells work and more
- Cellular (film), a 2004 movie
- Cellular frequencies, assigned to networks operating in cellular RF bands
- Cellular manufacturing
- Cellular network, cellular radio networks
- U.S. Cellular Field, also known as "The Cell", a baseball stadium in Chicago
- U.S. Cellular Arena, an arena in Milwaukee, Wisconsin

Terms such as cellular organization, cellular structure, cellular system, and so on may refer to:

- Cell biology, the evaluation of how cells work and more
- Cellular communication networks, systems for allowing communication through mobile phones and other mobile devices
- Cellular organizational structures, methods of human organization in social groups
- Clandestine cell organizations, entities organized to commit crimes, acts of terror, or other malicious activities

== See also ==
- Cell (disambiguation)
