= CELSS =

CELSS may refer to:

- Cellulose 1,4-β-cellobiosidase (reducing end), an enzyme
- Controlled ecological life-support system
