= Cels (surname) =

Cels is a surname. Notable people with this surname include:

- Cornelis Cels (1778–1859), Flemish painter
- Jacques Philippe Martin Cels (1740–1806), French botanist
- Jean-Michel Cels (1819–1894), Belgian landscape painter
- Luis Siret y Cels (1860–1934), Belgian-Spanish archaeologist and illustrator
