= CEL =

A cel is a transparent sheet on which objects are drawn or painted for animation purposes.

Cel may refer to:

- Cel (goddess), Etruscan goddess of the earth
- Cel Spellman (born 1995), English actor and presenter
- Aaron Cel (born 1987), French-Polish basketball player
- Cel Publishing, an imprint of VDM Publishing devoted to the reproduction of Wikipedia content
- cel, the ISO-639 code for Celtic languages
- -cel the suffix for incel/femcel

CEL may stand for:

- Carboxyl ester lipase or bile salt dependent lipase, an enzyme used in digestion
- Check engine light, a malfunction indicator lamp
- Chemin de Fer de l'Etat Libanais, the national railway network of the Lebanon
- China Energy Label
- Central Electronics Limited, India
- Communications and Entertainment Limited, a defunct Australian home video company
- RTÉ CEL, the commercial arm of Ireland's public service broadcaster RTÉ
- Comunidade do Escutismo Lusófono, the international community for scouting in Lusophone countries
- Chronic eosinophilic leukemia, an extremely rare cancer of the white blood cells
- Celsius Network, CEL token cryptocurrency

== See also ==
- Cell (disambiguation)
- Cels (disambiguation)
