= La'Mule =

Japanese band

- Origin: Shikoku, Japan
- Genres: Gothic metal; alternative metal
- Years active: 1996–2003, 2010–2012, 2014
- Labels: Music-Trick-R; Soleil; Bandai; Slit
- Members: Kon; Sin; Nao; Isuke; You-ya
- Past members: Mataii; Fumi; Yuki

La'Mule (formerly stylized as La:Mule) was a Japanese visual kei rock band formed in 1996. The band became known for its distinctive visual style, featuring blood and bandages.

== History ==
La'Mule were formed in 1996 in Shikoku, Japan. Allegedly the band was slow to release material as they preferred to participate in events with fans rather than spend time in the recording studio. Their first CD, Toki no Souretsu, was released in April 1998.

In September 1998, both guitarists (Yuki and Fumi) left the band, and were replaced by Sin and Nao. Their first nation-wide tour took place in November 1999.

In 2001, they formed Slit, their own record label, for the release of the album Climax. In 2003, La'Mule announced an indefinite hiatus. They re-formed in 2010 in order to play a number of live shows. In 2012, the band formally disbanded. Their last concert took place on April 6, 2012. That same year, vocalist Kon and guitarists Sin and Nao formed the band Cell. In 2014, La'Mule reunited to perform at the memorial event for Mirage drummer Ayame at Meguro Rokumeikan on March 22.

== Members ==
- Kon (紺) – lead vocals
- Sin – lead guitar
- Nao – rhythm guitar
- Isuke – bass
- You-ya – drums

Past members

- Mataii – drums (1996–1997)
- Fumi – guitar (1996–1998)
- Yuki – guitar (1996–1998)

== Discography ==
Demo tapes

- Lepra (1st press) (March, 1996)
- Black Tape (September 7, 1996)
- Lepra (2nd press) (November, 1996)
- Mis-take of Out-take (April, 1997)
- Joukei no Miyako (May, 1997)
- Mind Control/Usagi no Tsumi (January 6, 1998)
- Sola (July 18, 2001)

Albums

- Inspire (December 2, 1998)
- Fuyuutsuki ~Yuigadai Kikeikyouten~ (January 11, 1999)
- Climax (February 22, 2001)
- Best (September 10, 2002)
- Eyes Bloodshed (April 5, 2013)

Mini albums

- Toki no Souretsu (April 4, 1998)

Singles

- Curse (March 25, 1999)
- Kekkai -Glass Shinkei to Jiga Kyoukai- (July 28, 1999)
- Nigatsu Itsuka no Namida (March, 2000)
- Knife (June 6, 2000)
- Sweet Enemy (May 21, 2001)
- Memory of Flow (May 25, 2001)
- Ichinichi no Kodoku Hyakunen no Kodoku (July 20, 2001)
- Ran (December 24, 2001)
- Gimmick (February 2, 2002)
- Fit to Naked the Heavens Fall (May 29, 2002)
- Psycho Dive (November 11, 2002)
- Berlin (December 12, 2002)

Videos

- Inspire (February 12, 1999)
- Kekkai -Glass Shinkei to Jiga Kyoukai- (July 28, 1999)
- Curse (July 28, 1999)
- Knife (June 6, 2000)
- Sweet Enemy (May 21, 2001)
- Everlasting (September 23, 2002)
