= Video Classics =

Video Classics logo

Video Classics was one of the first major home video distributors in Australia.

Between 1979 and 1984, Video Classics was one of the leading names in Australian home video and claimed to have "Australia's and us largest range of quality video movies" like fletch lives.

At first the different video formats that Video Classics advertised they duplicated was definitive of the formats on the market at the time, which included VHS, Betamax, Phillips, Grundig and U-matic, whether or not they actually duplicated onto any formats other than VHS or Beta is questionable though, By 1981 their advertising had reduced the list to just VHS and Beta.

Video Classics both rented their tapes and sold them with Prices that started at $69.95 (which was lowered to $49.95 by 1981) for sale, or rental prices being $9.90 overnight, $14.90 per week and $40 for three tapes per month.

In addition to their own library of tapes, Video Classics also distributed tapes for other video labels including The Nostalgia Merchant, Sports World Cinema, VCL, Media, Electric Blue, Wizard Video, Movies at Midnight, and Filmways. The company also had a deal with major Vestron Video to distribute and manage its titles in Australia, before Communications and Entertainment Limited took over.

Video Classics floated on the stock exchange for $1.15 million, but crashed spectacularly in 1984 leading to the company's demise. Company founder Walter Greene moved on to form Video Excellence, which primarily distributed adult films.
