= Media Home Entertainment =

Defunct American home video company (1978–1993)

Media Home Entertainment Inc.
- Type: Division
- Industry: Home entertainment
- Founded: 1978; 48 years ago
- Founder: Charles Band
- Defunct: 1993; 33 years ago
- Fate: Closed
- Headquarters: Culver City, California
- Products: VHS
- Parent: Heron Communications
- Subsidiaries: Hi-Tops Video (1986–1991); Fox Hills Video (1986–1990); The Nostalgia Merchant (1985–1988)

Media Home Entertainment Inc. was a home video company headquartered in Culver City, California, originally established in 1978 by filmmaker Charles Band.

Media Home Entertainment also distributed video product under additional labels — The Nostalgia Merchant (old or classic films; Media bought this company in 1984), Hi-Tops Video (children's videos), Condor Video (Spanish-language titles, including Spanish dubs of films Media owned video rights to), and Fox Hills Video (a sell-through label, devoted to special-interest videos including NFL Films Video releases, some obscure B-movies and low-profile Cannon pictures). The "Fox Hills" name was derived from a geographical location near the company's headquarters at 5700 Buckingham Parkway.

Videos from the Media Home Entertainment library were also distributed overseas in the United Kingdom, Australia and New Zealand by VPD (Video Program Distributors) and Video Classics and in Japan by Tohokushinsha Film, respectively. Some releases by Media Home Entertainment and its associated sublabels were distributed in Canada by Astral Video, a now-defunct subsidiary of the present-day Astral Media (now part of Bell Media).

== History ==
The company got off to a rocky start when ABKCO Records successfully sued them for releasing The Rolling Stones' Hyde Park concert on Betamax and VHS, followed by a successful suit against it, VCI Home Video, and Video Tape Network filed by Northern Songs for releasing Beatles material (Media's tapes included Around The Beatles—featuring the Beatles and the Rolling Stones as backup singers, with performers such as Long John Baldry—a John Lennon solo concert, Magical Mystery Tour, a Shea Stadium concert, Sextette—featuring Beatles member Ringo Starr—and a Tokyo concert), but would eventually become one of the largest independent video distributors in the U.S., relying on acquired films, television programs, and children's programs to establish a library of product. Some releases from the company included the original Halloween, the majority of the Peanuts specials (up to 1984), The Adventures of the Wilderness Family, Enemies, A Love Story, I Come in Peace, some films from the Cannon Films library, Cinetel Films releases, Troma Entertainment films like Troma's War, the theatrical releases of rival video label Trans World Entertainment, and content from New Line Cinema, namely all of the Nightmare on Elm Street films in the 1980s (1984–1989), the first two Texas Chain Saw Massacre films (1974's original and 1986's second, "2", both Tobe Hooper's direction) and 1976's Assault on Precinct 13. Santa Claus: The Movie was licensed by Media directly from the Salkind family.

In December 1983, Media Home Entertainment was bought by Heron Communications Inc., a subsidiary of Gerald Ronson's Heron International; Heron had previously expanded into the British video market earlier in the year by way of the UK video company Videoform, which Heron purchased controlling interest in earlier that year.

Rumors swirled throughout 1987 that Media Home Entertainment was for sale by Heron (Carolco, part-owners of rival video label International Video Entertainment, were interested), but ultimately no sale happened at the time.

In March 1988, Heron forged a licensing deal with budget distributor Video Treasures to release sell-through copies of Media releases. Not long after, Media picked up the home video rights to the Morgan Creek Productions library. Media also picked up rights to Viacom Pictures telefilms in early 1990, by which point the deal with Video Treasures had expanded.

The death knell for Media came in early 1991, when parent Heron International opted to put Media up for sale, having already begun to sell Hi-Tops Video to Western Publishing; Heron indicated a reason for the sale was because it saw the video operations as not being relevant to either Heron's European operations or the gradual wind-down of Heron's other US assets (which largely consisted of financial and real-estate businesses). As a result, Media formed a distribution pact with FoxVideo, with the latter company handling distribution of Media's non-sell-through titles (Video Treasures continued to handle sell-through titles from Media's catalog). In hindsight, the sale may have been motivated by Heron's financial issues after Ronson was convicted in the Guinness share frauds scandal, which sent Heron into a financial tailspin by 1994.

Media Home Entertainment ceased operations in 1993, described as being under "caretaker management"; Video Treasures retained rights to portions of the Media library for several years afterwards. After it shut down, MHE's Kathy Smith titles moved to A*Vision Entertainment under the then-new BodyVision label.
