= Derann =

British electronics store and film distributor (1964-2011)

Derann Film Services
- Industry: Film and electronics
- Founded: 1964; 62 years ago
- Founders: Derek and Anne Simmonds
- Defunct: 2011; 15 years ago
- Headquarters: Dudley, West Midlands, England
- Area served: Worldwide (film); West Midlands (electronics)
- Products: Super 8 mm film subjects, home electronics, video
- Website: Company home page

Derann Film Services, commonly referred to as Derann, was a British electronics store and small format film distributor based in Dudley, England, notable for being the world's biggest distributor of Super 8 mm film during the 1970s and 1980s. The company closed down in 2011.

== History ==
Derann was founded in 1964 by Derek Simmonds (23 December 1935 - 19 September 2002) and his wife Anne, whose first names made up the company title. Originally renting out 8 mm films from a spare bedroom in their Stourbridge home, their business gradually grew, and eventually they relocated to offices to downtown Dudley.

In the following years, the company managed to secure deals with MCA, EMI, United Artists, 20th Century Fox, and eventually Disney, giving them rights to the production and sale of Super 8 cutdowns and versions of their films. By the early 1980s it is estimated that the company held around 10,000 titles in their library, many of them exclusive to Derann.

During the 1980s, both Betamax and VHS entered the market as competitors to small format film, and the company saw a rapid decline in film sales in favour of the new, more practical formats. Derann moved into this new market and produced many video feature films carrying the Derann logo (some of which still turn up on eBay), although they continued to produce and sell Super 8 mm content to customers around the world. In the late 1980s, Derann began selling home electronics, video and audio equipment in particular, to increase their financial strength. By the 1990s, Super 8 had nearly disappeared as a format for most users, remaining only in the collections of film fans and those who already had the necessary, and expensive, equipment required to project such a format. With the entrance of the internet in most homes during the late 90s/early 00s, Derann expanded their film sales division online, although they had already been selling to foreign markets via postal order for many years. However, the market for Super 8 was still shrinking, and home electronics soon became their main business.

Following the death of founder Derek Simmonds in 2002, his son Adrian Simmonds took over the company, and provided new resources to the film department. Continuing sales online and via postal order, the company continued to produce brand new Super 8 content until 2007, after which they focused on clearing out old stock from storage.

=== Closure ===
As their old stock films began to disappear, production of films was halted in 2010, without notice. Following a prolonged period of downsizing, and with the effects of the ongoing financial crisis taking its toll on such a small company, CEO Adrian Simmonds announced in early 2011 that Derann would cease operations before the end of the year. After paying host to their last ever "Open Day" on 11 September 2011, Derann closed their doors for the last time. At the time of closure, it was one of four professional retailers still selling cine film and equipment.
