= Jean-Michel Cels =

Belgian landscape painter

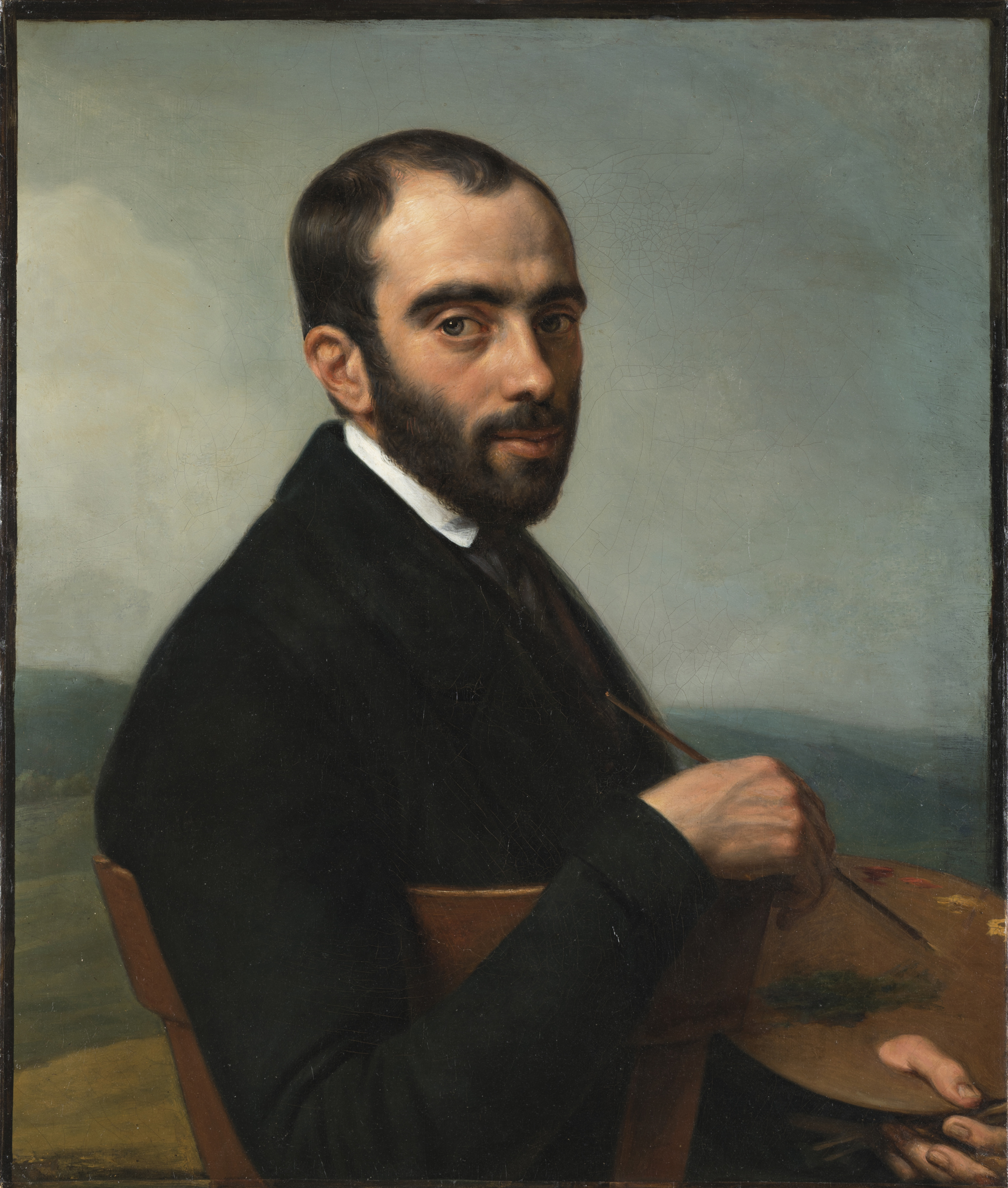
- Portrait of Jean-Michel Cels, 1847, painted by his father Cornelis Cels
- Born: 1819; The Hague
- Died: 1894 (aged 74–75); Brussels

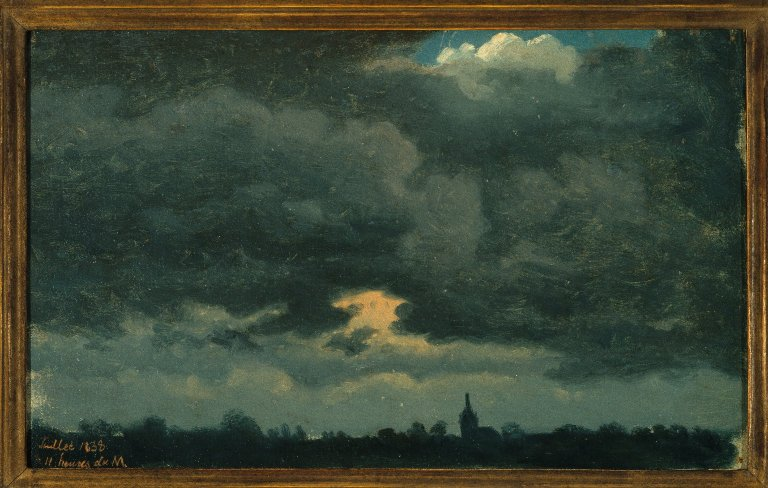
Stormy sky over landscape with distant church, collection Brooklyn Museum

Jean-Michel Cels (1819 – 1881) was a Belgian landscape painter.

He was born in the Hague as the son of the painter Cornelis Cels, who taught him to paint. He was the brother of the architect Josse Cels.
