= Braveworld =

British video distribution company

Braveworld Video was a UK video distribution company founded by ex-WEA Records and Warner Home Video Managing Director Mike Heap (1944–2019). It was originally established in March 1985, initially with sales and distribution through IVS Video UK (which shortly became Castle Pictures). After the IVS tie-up ended, the company became known as Braveworld Limited in approximately 1987.

Braveworld was owned by Prestwich Holdings, Plc (a transatlantic investment company whose larger portfolio included US distributor Prism Video and Bush/Alba Electronics).

Record (and later special interest/music video) label Legend Music Group was a misfired short-lived Braveworld side project, as was Sheer Entertainment (a rental video label which released a handful of direct-to-video genre titles in 1987, notably Prom Night II: Hello Mary Lou).

Another of Prestwich Holdings's video companies was The Video Collection(a retail video label founded in collaboration with Woolworths which was the UK's most successful distributor in the 1980s). As such, Braveworld and The Video Collection were 'sister' labels, with Braveworld's original purpose to acquire and release cinema and rental titles, and Video Collection a retail feature film and special interest title distributor which relied heavily on re-releasing classic films.

Accordingly, many of Braveworld's titles were released on 'sell-through' video under the Video Collection name. Braveworld was eventually dissolved via a compulsory liquidation in 1999 after years of heavy losses; its final videos were released in mid-1994.

The Video Collection, however, lived on (through various owners including, in the early 2000s, a joint-venture with BBC Video as 2|Entertain), to great success until it was unable to survive the Great Recession, which saw the UK high-street retailer Woolworths (its main revenue stream) fall into administration.

== Releases ==
Braveworld's major 1988 – 1991 rental titles which had received theatrical exploitation (e.g. The Monster Squad, The Running Man, The Blob (1988), House III, Nightbreed) were distributed by Warner Home Video/MGM/UA and RCA/Columbia Pictures International Video. The MGM/UA collaboration began in 1990.

This era's practice of handing over rental distribution duties to a major studio also occurred with some of New World Video, Virgin Vision, Castle Pictures and Medusa Communications' titles was due to consolidation in the UK video industry (exacerbated by the 1990 recession), with the major studios gaining control of rental sales and distribution networks.

As independent labels were retreating and did not have the salesforce to distribute their larger titles to rental video shops across the UK, they agreed sales/distribution pacts with the studios for high-demand titles.

== Selected Braveworld Video Releases ==
- Alligator (retail; released to coincide with 1990's sequel)
- Alligator II: The Mutation (rental and retail)
- The Arrival (rental)
- Basket Case 3 (rental)
- Billionaire Boys Club (rental; with IVS)
- The Blob (1988) (cinema, rental and retail) (rental through RCA/Columbia)
- The Blob (1958) (retail; released to coincide with 1988's remake)
- Beware! The Blob (1972) (retail; released to coincide with 1988's remake)
- Control (rental)
- Enigma (rental)
- Evil Altar (rental)
- The First Power (rental; through Warner/MGM)
- The Forgotten One (rental)
- Freddy's Nightmares (retail/rental)
- The Gate II (rental; through Warner/MGM)
- Halloween 4 (cinema, rental and retail; rental through Warner/MGM)
- House III (rental and retail)
- I Bought a Vampire Motorcycle (cinema, rental)
- Major League (cinema, rental, retail)
- Mindfield (rental; through Warner/MGM)
- The Monster Squad (cinema, rental, retail) (rental through RCA/Columbia; retail as Video Collection)
- Murder Rap (rental; unusually also featuring Castle Pictures branding)
- Nightbreed (cinema, rental and retail) (rental through Warner/MGM)
- Return of the Family Man (rental) (rental through RCA/Columbia)
- The Running Man (cinema, rental and retail) (rental through RCA/Columbia; retail as The Video Collection)
- Scanners II: The New Order (rental; through Warner/MGM)
- Slaughterhouse (rental and retail)
- Spontaneous Combustion (rental; through Warner/MGM)
- Taste of Hemlock (retail)
- The Uninvited
