= Cornelis Cels =

Flemish painter

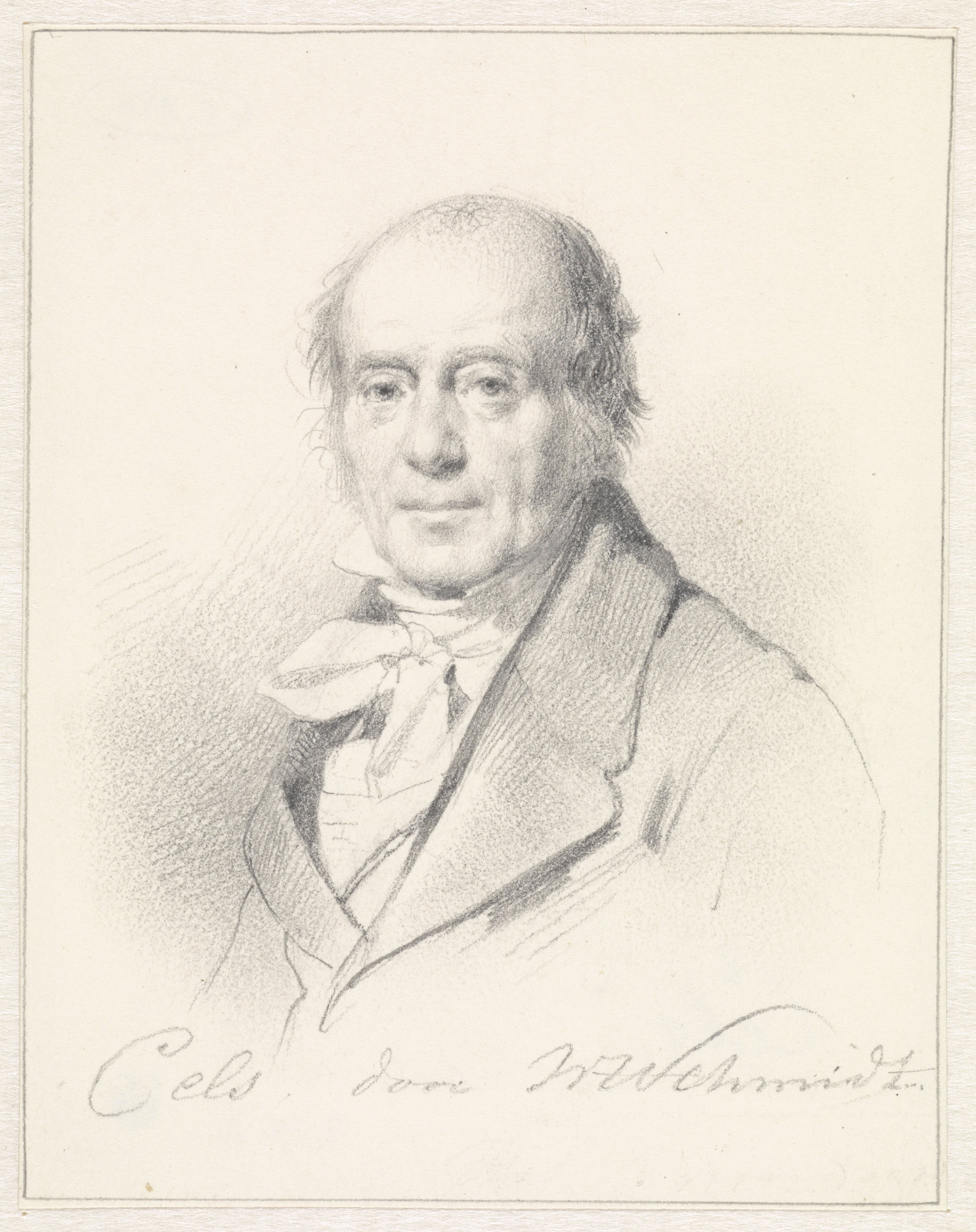
Portrait of Cornelis Cels by Willem Hendrik Schmidt

Cornelis Cels (10 June 1778 – 3 March 1859) was a Flemish painter of portraits and religious subjects. He was a professor and director of the Académie des Beaux-Arts de Tournai (Academy of Fine Arts, Tournai). He was patronized as a portrait painter by the court of The Hague.

== Life ==
=== Early life and education ===
Cels was born in Lier in the Duchy of Brabant in 1778. His family was one of the prominent families in Lier. He initially studied under the sculptor Pompe and then under P.-J. Denis. He later went to study under the Antwerp painter Andries Cornelis Lens who had settled in Brussels and was then very successful. He studied under Lens from 1795 to 1800.

=== France and Italy ===
Cels travelled to Paris in September 1800 where he worked for a while under fellow Flemish painter Joseph-Benoît Suvée, a Classicist painter. He then travelled on to Italy where he visited Florence and Naples and then settled in Rome where he remained for seven years. While in Rome, Cels sent his painting Cincinnatus (current location unknown) to the competition of the Academy of Ghent in 1802 where it won the golden prize. One of his works - a Descent from the Cross (St. Paul's Church, Antwerp) - in the Pantheon in Rome. He had been commissioned to paint the work as replacement for works by Rubens, which had been confiscated by the French occupiers. This work was so admired that Cels was immediately admitted as member and professor of the prestigious Accademia di San Luca in Rome. During his residence in Rome, he painted many other commissions from Catholic institutions in Flanders and the Netherlands for religious works to replace paintings that had been lost to the French plunder.

=== Flanders and death ===
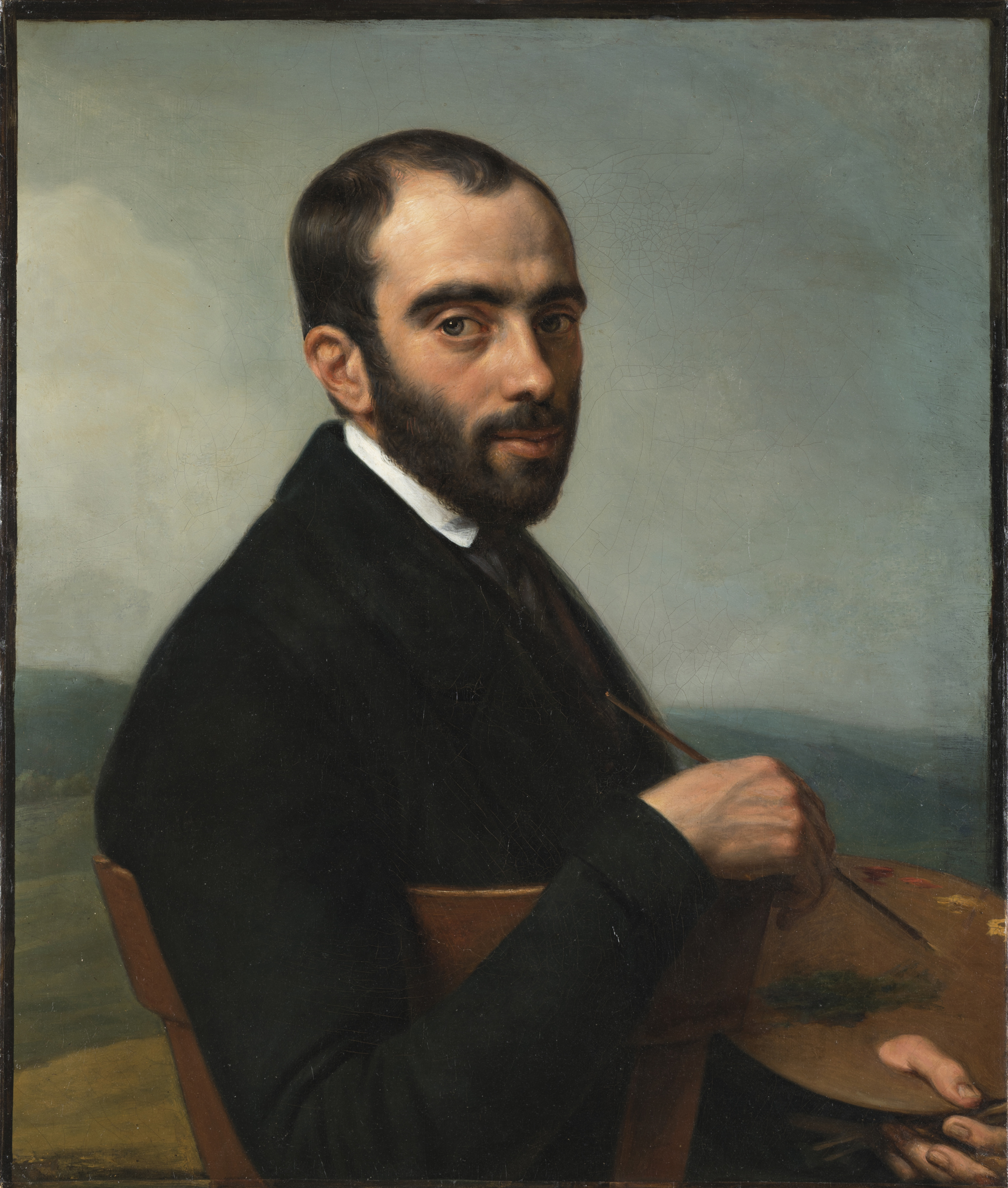
Portrait of Jean-Michel Cels, painted by his father in 1847

He returned to Flanders and lived and worked in Antwerp until 1815. That year he moved to The Hague, the administrative centre of the new Kingdom of the Netherlands of which the Southern Netherlands had become a part in 1815. Here he enjoyed the patronage of the royal court and was frequently commissioned to paint portraits of the royal family as well as other prominent sitters. He was admitted as a member of the Academy of Antwerp, the Academy of Amsterdam and correspondent of the Institut Néerlandais.

Cels was appointed in 1820 to the professorship of drawing and director at the Académie des Beaux-Arts de Tournai (Academy of Fine Arts, Tournai), positions he held until he resigned in 1827. He subsequently settled in Brussels, where he resided until his death except for a trip to England in 1836.

== Family ==
He was the father of Jean-Michel Cels, a landscape painter, and Josse Cels, an architect, who were trained by their father.

== Work ==
Cels was a painter of religious subjects as well as portraits. He also produced a few genre paintings. His work was influenced by the Neo-Classicist style becoming prevalent at the end of the 18th century. His masters Lens and Suvée were both representatives of this style in Flanders.

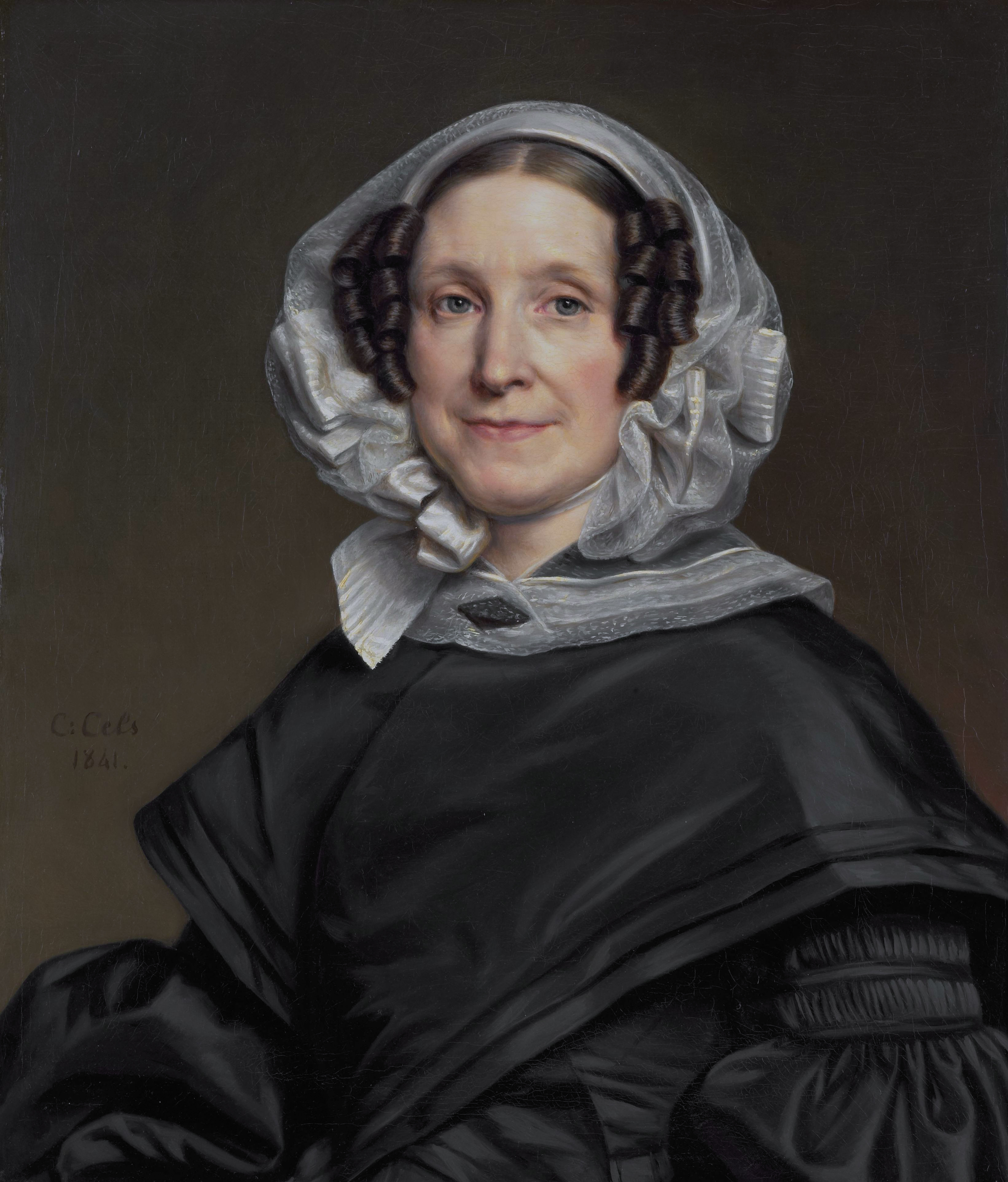
Portrait of Aryna van der Pot

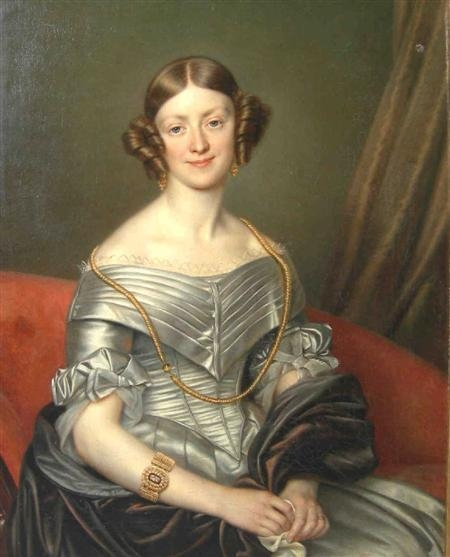
Portrait of Jessy Macpherson

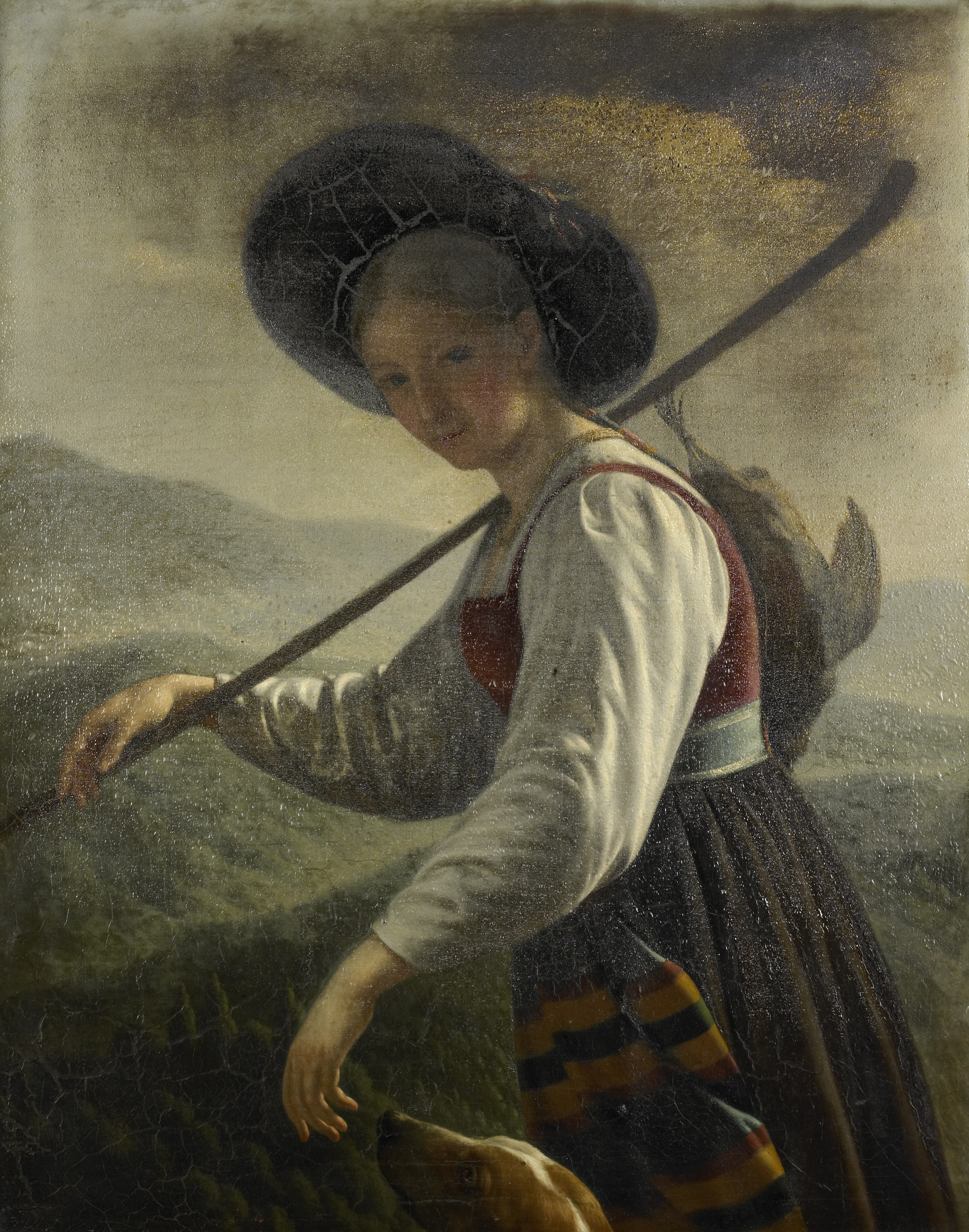
Swiss farm girl

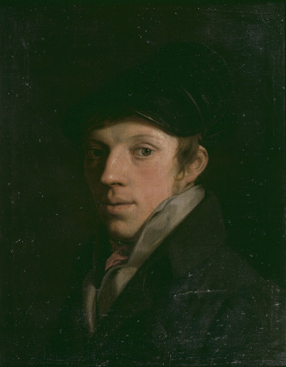
Portrait of the painter Pierre-François Jacobs
