= Cell (Japanese band) =

Japanese rock band

- Origin: Tokyo, Japan
- Genres: Alternative rock; alternative metal; metalcore; hard rock
- Years active: 2012–2015
- Label: Spark Co. Ltd
- Members: Kon(紺); Nao; Sin; Yuki
- Website: cell-official.com

Cell (セル) was a Japanese visual kei rock band, formed in May 2012 by Kon, former vocalist of the bands La'Mule and NightingeiL.

== Biography ==
Vocalist KON (ex.La'Mule), guitarists SIN and NAO (both ex. La'Mule), and bassist YUKI came together and formed the band in April 2012. Composed with infinite styles and possibilities of the band, creating a new form, CELL launched had launched their activity.

Shortly after the band's formation, a series of One Man concerts had been held at the Ikebukuro EDGE. The band had released 3 maxi singles, 1 DVD single, and contributed to former X Japan guitarist hide's tribute album hide TRIBUTE -VISUAL STYLES II- covering the song "Hurry Go Round".

Since 2013, CELL has been boosted their activities internationally being invited as the special guest to one of Los Angeles's biggest Japanese Convention AX2013 and played the band's first U.S. show. In 2014, Vocalist KON had appeared as a guest representing CELL at the LA VK Fest held in Downtown, Los Angeles, as well as holding a Livestream Q&A Session for fans in the States.

At their presents live at NAGOYA HOLIDAY NEXT on November 28, 2014, the band announced that they will take a hiatus after their oneman live, "星に願いを…" (hoshi ni negai wo...) at Ikebukuro EDGE on January 18, 2015.

Vocalist KON's lyrics is brought in empathy with where all living humans walks through in Life, Love, Anger, Irritation, and Strength.

After releasing their 1st Single CD "Jikogenkyu Paradox" the band had toured throughout Japan with LIN with the title "Infinite ~CELL vs. LIN~" At the last show of the tour held at Ikebukuro EDGE, the band announced that they will be going on an indefinite hiatus. CELL had held their last show before their break at Ikebukuro EDGE called "Hoshi ni Negai wo..." (Prayers to the star...) on January 18, 2015.

== Members ==
- Kon (紺) – vocals
- Nao – guitar
- Sin – guitar
- Yuki – bass

Former member(s)

- MASATO – Drums (2012.7.13 – 2012.10.20)

→ CELL → ALDEBARAN

- 結汝 (Yuna) – Support Drums

→ Malefice Dia → End;Re → CELL (support), La'veil MizeriA (support)

- クロ (Kuro) – Support Drums (2012.9.16 – 2014.5.31)

→ GerVelir → Logic → ビスコ → VelBet → 砂月 (support) → Vanish → CELL (support)

== Discography ==
Singles

- Haitoku to Ketsudan no ishi (背徳と決断の意思 Jan 9, 2013)
- Houkai to Seisai no izu (崩壊と制裁の意図 August 28, 2013)
- Kimi wo yogoshita (君を汚した Feb 8th, 2014)
- Jikogenkyu Paradox (自己言及パラドックス July 18, 2014)

Digital Maxi Single

- For You.. (April 10, 2015)

Live Distributed Singles

- 2012.07.13 蝋の翼
- 2012.08.11 どうせ終わる世界ならあなたがいい
- 2012.09.16 STRANDING～神経衰弱細胞～
- 2012.10.20 危険な私
- 2012.12.07 em思想

Splits CD

- Infinite with 凛 Kisaki's band (live-limited October 26, 2014)

DVD Singles

- "Kiken na Watashi" (危険な私 May 29, 2013)

Live DVDs

- "Saigo, Tsubushita Kotoba" (最後、潰した言葉, April 13, 2013)
