= Cellular organizational structure =

Non-hierarchical organisational structure

Suppose that this 3x3 grid image depicts a social group with nine homogeneous people. With them all in communication with at least one other person, as symbolized by the black lines, the top left individual is part of both a three-person project (area in light red) and a four-person project (area in teal). Organized in a cellular structure, the group may still have both of those projects survive even if the top left person drops out of everything.

A non-biological entity with a cellular organizational structure (also known as a cellular organization, cellular system, nodal organization, nodal structure, et cetera) is set up in such a way that it mimics how natural systems within biology work, with individual 'cells' or 'nodes' working somewhat independently to establish goals and tasks, administer those things, and troubleshoot difficulties." These cells exist in a broader network in which they frequently communicate with each other, exchanging information, in a more or less even organizational playing field. Numerous examples have existed both in economic terms as well as for groups working towards other pursuits. This structure, as applied in areas such as business management, exists in direct contrast to traditional hierarchical leadership that is seen in institutions such as United States federal agencies, where one type of supervisor gives specific orders to another supervisor and so on down the line.

== Background and concepts ==
Creating cellular organizations fundamentally involves mimicking processes that occur in natural processes. This entails fostering both strong senses of independence and interdependence, with improvement being seen at a central level as a continuous, gradual phenomenon. Each individual cell experiences either negative or positive reinforcements for its specific behaviors. Advocates for these organizational structures state that their key asset is adaptability.

With respect to armed conflict, political revolutionaries such as Che Guevera and Mao Tse-tung advocated this kind of approach in terms of mounting guerrilla warfare. Should the state take out a few clandestine cell groups, many other nodes within the general structure remain to continue fighting on. The two figures highlighted this in their influential writings. More recently, government entities such as the United States Department of Homeland Security (itself a strictly managed hierarchical system) have faced problems dealing with terrorist organizations due to those groups' efficient use of cellular organizational planning.

A cellular business structure is partly related, philosophically speaking, to the notion of 'spontaneous order' described by prominent Austrian–British social theorist F. A. Hayek. The theory posits that free association and open access to up-to-date information will lead to individuals naturally creating and sustaining social groups to co-operate for mutual benefit. Information management is a crucial aspect of why even otherwise successful groups will face compounding difficulties and perhaps fail due to problems with interpersonal communication and other issues.

== Research and specific examples ==
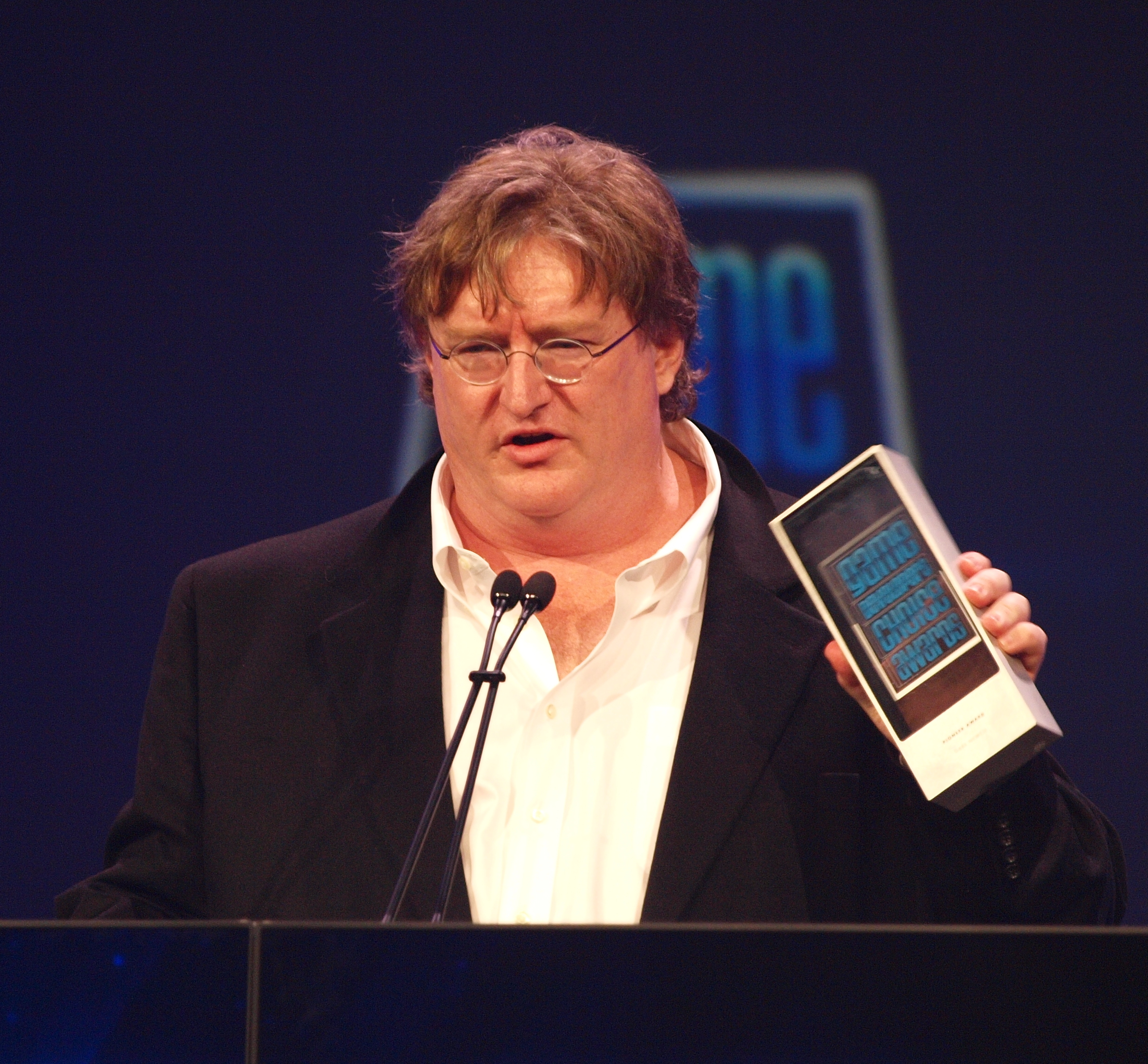
Gabe Newell, pictured speaking in 2010, is one of the co-creators of Valve.

A prominent example of a 'spontaneous order' based organization is the software company Valve and its Steam platform, which has been used for digital distribution of video game related materials. Economist Yanis Varoufakis, who has been a professor at both the University of Athens and the University of Texas as well as a Valve consultant, has remarked on the program EconTalk that "the mobility within the corporation is a great asset, and everybody recognizes it". He's also stated, "Everybody's desk is on wheels. There are only two plugs that need to be unplugged in order to shift from one team to another."

Outside of the economic context, World War II featured a variety of different conflict zones practicing various tactics. Fighting against the onslaught of Nazi Germany, anti-fascist militants such as Marshal Josip Broz Tito's partisans organized in a distributed manner so that they could make spontaneous-like attacks before melting away into the general area. The diversity of leadership meant that each individual cell of militants had significant leeway, though they felt strictly loyal to Tito and the general anti-Nazi cause. Many of these partisans remained involved in Yugoslavian affairs after the war ended.

Professors Brent B. Allred, Raymond E. Miles, and Charles C. Snow have cited instances of cellular organization in terms of the telecommunications industry in Australia, specifically referring to the firm Technical Computing and Graphics (TCG) as an example due to how its processes have created successful work for partners such as Hitachi and Telstra.

Tony Hsieh, the CEO of Zappos, has remarked that his business considers cellular-type self-management groups to be a key to its potential longevity, highlighting the contrast between a standard corporate structure and that of a diverse city. In a 2017 interview on the U.S. news program PBS NewsHour, he remarked, "Most companies, as they get bigger, they become less nimble, less innovative, less productive. Every time the size of a city doubles, innovation or productivity per resident increases by 15%... you get more people in a relatively smaller area... then you get this crossover of ideas from different creative types and entrepreneurs and businesses."

== See also ==
- Antifragility
- Complexity theory and organizations
- Engineering of systems
- Enterprise modelling
- Flat organization
- Information management
- Hierarchical organization
- Organizational architecture
- Organizational culture
- Organizational structure
- Psychology of organizations
- Social group
- Spontaneous order
- Systems theory
- Clandestine cell system
- Unorganisation
