= Cellulose 1,4-β-cellobiosidase (reducing end) =

Identifiers
- EC no.: 3.2.1.176

Databases
- IntEnz: IntEnz view
- BRENDA: BRENDA entry
- ExPASy: NiceZyme view
- KEGG: KEGG entry
- MetaCyc: metabolic pathway
- PRIAM: profile
- PDB structures: RCSB PDB PDBe PDBsum
Search
- PMC: articles
- PubMed: articles
- NCBI: proteins

Cellulose 1,4-β-cellobiosidase (reducing end) (EC 3.2.1.176, CelS, CelSS, endoglucanase SS, cellulase SS, cellobiohydrolase CelS, Cel48A) is an enzyme with systematic name 4-beta-D-glucan cellobiohydrolase (reducing end). This enzyme catalyses the following chemical reaction

Hydrolysis of (1->4)-beta-D-glucosidic linkages in cellulose and similar substrates, releasing cellobiose from the reducing ends of the chains.

The CelS enzyme from Clostridium thermocellum is the most abundant subunit of the cellulosome formed by the organism.
