= BBC Studios Home Entertainment =

British video and music publisher

2 Entertain Video Limited
- On-screen logo used since 2021

- Legal logo used since 2005
- Trade name: BBC Studios Home Entertainment
- Formerly: BBC Video (1980–2004); Rushstage Limited (June–August 1985); Future Vision Limited (1985–1987); Video Collection International Limited (1987–2004); BBC DVD (1997–2009); BBC Home Entertainment (2009–2018)
- Type: Private limited company
- Industry: Video and music publishing
- Founded: June 1, 1980; 46 years ago (BBC Video/DVD); 21 June 1985; 41 years ago (Video Collection International – As Rushstage Ltd); September 14, 2004; 22 years ago (BBC Studios Home Entertainment – As 2 Entertain)
- Founders: BBC Worldwide; Woolworths Group
- Headquarters: London, England, UK
- Key people: Helene Gustavii (Jan 2013–) (CEO)
- Revenue: ▼£24 million (2023)
- Net income: ▼£4 million (2023)
- Total assets: ▼£11 million (2023)
- Number of employees: 1 (2023)
- Parent: BBC Worldwide (1980–2018); Woolworths Group (2004–2010); BBC Studios (2018–present)
- Website: shop.bbc.com/collections/bbc-dvd/

2 Entertain Video Limited, trading as BBC Studios Home Entertainment, is a British video and music publisher founded in 2004 following the merger of BBC Video and Video Collection International by BBC Worldwide and the Woolworths Group respectively.

== History ==
=== BBC Video ===
The first BBC Video opening logo, used from 1980 to 1988

BBC Video was established in 1980 as a division of BBC Enterprises (later BBC Worldwide) with John Ross Barnard at the head, just as home video systems were starting to gain ground.

At launch, the BBC had no agreement with British talent unions such as Equity or the Musician's Union (MU), so BBC Video was limited in the television programming it could release. Initially, video cassette and laserdisc releases were either programmes with no Equity or MU involvement, such as natural history and other documentaries, or material licensed from third parties, including feature films such as High Noon and the first video release of Deep Purple's California Jam concert.

For the first few years, the BBC produced videotapes in both VHS and Betamax formats. The company also worked with Philips on early Laserdisc releases, including a notable ornithology disc called British Garden Birds, presented by David Attenborough. This disc was released in 1982 and included digital data in the form of Teletext, which could be read by any suitably equipped television set. This pioneering use of a data channel on a consumer video format led directly to the development of the BBC Domesday Project in 1984–1986. Since videos could have stereo soundtracks, BBC Video produced stereophonic versions of many programmes that had been broadcast in mono. These included The Hitchhiker's Guide to the Galaxy and the wedding of Charles, Prince of Wales, and Lady Diana Spencer.

The label grew significantly from £13 million turnover in 1989 to nearly £39 million in 1994, enjoying success from television and film serials which had proved popular when first televised and faced high demand for a video release once the new technology became widespread, thus reducing the need for television reruns.

In 1991, BBC Video was the number-one video label in the UK, selling more pre-recorded videotapes, both in value and in unit count, than any other company, including all the Hollywood studios combined.

=== Video Collection International ===
==== Launch ====
In October 1985, K-Tel and Braveworld, subsidiaries of the New Southgate-based Prestwich Group, in partnership with Paddy Toomey, launched "The Video Collection", a range of budget-priced video releases that were promoted as being "A video for the price of a blank tape" that would be sold at Woolworths stores across the country. Both Braveworld and The Video Collection were seen as sister labels, with The Video Collection mainly handling re-releases of classic films and special interest television titles.

==== Expansion ====
By 1986, The Video Collection underwent a management buyout through the holding company Rushstage Limited (later renamed to "Future Vision Limited", then eventually, "Video Collection International Limited" in 1987). With this, the company expanded rapidly, securing a market lead in retail video sales in the mid-to-late 1980s and the early-to-mid-1990s. In the same year, the company began its long association with handling the home video distribution of ITV programmes, beginning with the launch of Thames Video Collection, formed as part of a deal with Thames Television. In May, the music video division The Video Music Collection was launched. In July, they signed an agreement with Karl-Lorimar Home Video to distribute children's, family, and special interest programs for the British market, including those from Scholastic-Lorimar Home Video.

In 1989, The Video Collection expanded to the budget video realm with the launch of Cinema Club, which re-released the back catalogue of movies from RCA Columbia Pictures International Video/Columbia TriStar Home Video and other distributors such as Buena Vista Home Entertainment. Beginning in 1989, another ITV franchisee, Central Independent Television, began exclusively distributing its home video releases through The Video Collection, replacing a prior deal with Pickwick Video.

In 1991, Hat Trick Productions and VCI signed a deal to release the former's material on home video under a dedicated Hat Trick video label.

In May 1993, Video Collection International's parent company, Strand VCI plc, became simply VCI plc.

==== Rebranding to VCI ====
In 1995, The Video Collection was renamed to VCI. In April, VCI plc acquired a 49% minority stake in Hat Trick Productions' film unit - Hat Trick Films. The deal would allow VCI to invest £250,000 in the company's films, with a further £450,000 available for the next 18 months. The deal would expect 10 projects a year, with £50,000 paid per script. The deal followed VCI and Hat Trick's existing home video deal. They had also renewed their home video deal with Thames Television later on in the year. Cinema Club would transition into a stand-alone division of VCI plc, now operating as a joint-venture with Columbia TriStar Home Video.

On 20 January 1996, the company secured a ten-year extension to its home video deal with Manchester United and purchased the club's book and publishing interests for £2.4 million. In September, the company had talks with the club for a possible £300 million takeover, but this never came into fruition. At the end of the year, Central's video contract with VCI expired and was not renewed following the company's purchase by Carlton Communications the previous year, with Central fully moving over to Carlton Home Entertainment. VCI would also take over retail distribution of FilmFour releases, although FilmFour would, however, retain rental rights as VCI only operated sell-through.

Thames's longtime home video agreement with VCI ended at the beginning of 1998, when they went on to self-distribute through their parent company Pearson Television's Pearson New Entertainment division; later renamed Pearson Television Video (PT Video). At the same time, VCI took over the distribution for Channel 4 Video releases under a new deal with the broadcaster, and signed a deal with Feature Film. In March, VCI entered into a five-year joint venture with the Granada Media Group to launch the "Granada Video" label. The deal would bring a further 15,000 hours worth of content into VCI's catalogue, including programmes from GMG-owned ITV franchisees (Granada Television, LWT, Tyne Tees Television and Yorkshire Television), but would include GMG's film division.

==== Sale to Kingfisher Group and divesture to Woolworths Group ====
On 8 September 1998, SMG, who already held a 26.1% share in VCI, made a £31 million bid to purchase the company outright. On 22 September, Kingfisher Group counter-approached with a higher bid of £46.8 million. Afterwards, SMG sold its stake in VCI to Kingfisher, allowing them to fully purchase VCI for £59.3 million. The deal was closed by December, and VCI plc became a fully-owned subsidiary.

In January 2000, VCI's music division - MCI (Music Collection International), was renamed as the Demon Music Group. On 6 October, VCI exited the literature market by selling André Deutsch to Carlton Communications. This also included literature rights to Granada Media's properties and the Manchester United Books imprint.

In July 2001, VCI plc was divested with Woolworths as part of the newly formed Woolworths Group. In September, VCI expanded their longtime home video agreement with Ragdoll Productions, securing a seven-year deal to release the revival of Brum on home video. The deal was expanded again in November 2002 for Boohbah, as a five-year deal.

At the end of May 2002, the Cinema Club joint venture with Columbia TriStar Home Entertainment was terminated. With this, VCI plc relaunched Cinema Club as a specialist budget catalogue division of the company while CTHE signed a new joint-venture deal with Universal Pictures (UK) Ltd to form UCA (Universal Columbia Alliance). In June, VCI plc sold Disc Distribution to Deluxe Video Services, allowing them to physically distribute VCI's products.

In July 2002, Woolworths Group announced its intentions to sell off the business.

=== 2 Entertain/BBC Studios Home Entertainment ===
On 12 July 2004, BBC Worldwide and Woolworths Group announced they had entered into a joint venture to form 2 Entertain (stylized as 2 | entertain), which would combine BBC Worldwide's video publishing unit (BBC Video) with Woolworths Group's video publishing, music publishing and video production unit (Video Collection International). BBC Worldwide would hold 60%, while the Woolworths Group would hold 40%, additionally, both BBC Worldwide and Woolworths Group wanted 2 Entertain to better compete with the major studios. The deal was completed on 27 September with Video Collection International being renamed 2 Entertain Video Ltd. in October. During this transition period, BBC Worldwide continued distributing their releases while 2 Entertain continued to use the VCI brand for theirs. By June 2005, the 2 Entertain brand replaced the VCI brand on the packaging, and the transition was fully completed by September 2005 with the addition of BBC's releases. BBC Worldwide continued to hold standalone rights to children's, music, and educational releases.

2 Entertain consisted of four major divisions, 2 Entertain (full-sale video label), Cinema Club (Budget video label), Demon Music Group (Music label) and Banana Split Productions (Production/Commercial label).
Much of the home video deals and partnerships that VCI previously handled were retained, including HIT Entertainment (for Thomas & Friends releases), Ragdoll Productions (for Brum, Boohbah and Rosie and Jim) and their worldwide home video deal with Manchester United.

At the end of the year, the Granada Media home video deal was not renewed following the merger of Granada and Carlton into ITV plc and, as such, they moved to the then-rebranded Granada Ventures division (now known as ITV Studios Home Entertainment).

In June 2005, Channel 4 announced that it would move its home video distribution in-house, with the broadcaster's deputy managing director of rights and consumer products stating that it would give Channel 4 more control and to offer better deals to the rights owners and talent. In August, 2 Entertain signed a deal with Five to launch a Milkshake! branded video label.

For 2006, the company expanded their video partnership with Chapman Entertainment to include Roary the Racing Car, signed a deal with CCI Entertainment for Harry and His Bucket Full of Dinosaurs, and a major video deal with Bristol-based animation studio Aardman Animations.

In September 2008, 2 Entertain secured home video rights from RDF Rights for Mister Maker and Big Barn Farm. In March 2009, the company extended their Aardman deal to include Timmy Time and their RDF Rights deal to include Waybuloo.

==== Full purchase by BBC Worldwide ====
On 26 November 2008, BBC Worldwide announced that it was in talks about purchasing Woolworths Group's 40% stake in 2 Entertain. BBC initially offered £100 million, but by December following Woolworths' collapse into administration they reduced the offer to £40 Million. In July 2009, BBC Worldwide had written off £15 million after the collapse of the chain. and would end up winning a court case over 2 Entertain's rights to BBC content.

In March 2010, BBC Worldwide announced that it had finally reached an agreement to purchase Woolworths Group's 40% stake in 2 Entertain, making it a fully owned subsidiary. After the deal closed, BBC Worldwide's standalone rights to children's, music, and educational products transferred to 2 Entertain.

Starting in May 2012, the BBC label once again began to be solely used for BBC broadcast content, while the 2 Entertain label was reduced to being used for non-BBC broadcast content. In addition, the company was eventually renamed BBC Studios Home Entertainment (although 2 Entertain is still the legal name of the company).

In April 2022, BBC Studios Home Entertainment (and therefore 2 Entertain) signed a distribution deal with British distributor Spirit Entertainment to represent its physical catalogue in the United Kingdom, following the expiration of their deal with Sony DADC, which had been in place since 2011.

=== International deals ===
==== BBC Video ====
In the United States, BBC Video's releases were initially distributed by CBS/Fox Video throughout the 1980s and 1990s until the end of June 2000, when the two companies decided not to renew their deal. On 28 June 2000, BBC Worldwide announced a new partnership with Warner Home Video that would begin effectively on 1 July 2000, excluding the release of Walking with Dinosaurs, which was instead transferred over from CBS/Fox to Warner on 1 September 2000. In December 2006, 2 Entertain (which had been releasing most of the BBC's output in the UK around that time) renewed their US distribution agreement with Warner Home Video for BBC content.

In Australia and New Zealand, BBC Worldwide initially distributed their products through PolyGram Video before entering into a long-term partnership with both ABC Commercial and Roadshow Entertainment that began in 1996 and was renewed many times, with one of them being a four-year extension occurring in September 2008. On 30 April 2012, BBC Worldwide signed a five-year standalone Australian and New Zealand deal with Roadshow Entertainment within a five-year period, beginning 1 July. Following the expiration of this deal, BBC Worldwide/Studios began distributing its products through Universal Sony Pictures Home Entertainment. After this deal expired, the BBC transitioned distribution over to Madman Entertainment beginning in September 2023.

In Latin America and Brazil, BBC Worldwide signed a deal with En Pantalla in March 2007 for the distribution of BBC's factual titles.

==== Video Collection International ====
===== Europe =====
The Video Collection label was briefly used in European territories throughout the mid-late 1980s, operating in France as Vidéo Collection France, and in Spain as Vídeo Colección S.A.

===== North America =====
In 1989, VCI formed a North American subsidiary called Strand VCI Entertainment, which would distribute content in North America. Strand VCI held the North American rights to several properties including Thomas The Tank Engine & Friends, the ABC Kidtime video lineup, the 1989 The Jungle Book anime series, as well as content from ITN. The company also released music content on VHS, including Queen's "We Will Rock You" live concert. They were rebranded as Strand Home Video in 1992.

In March 1993, Strand signed a seven-year extension with Quality Family Entertainment to continue to be the exclusive distributor for Thomas the Tank Engine & Friends home videos in North America until 1999. They also signed a distribution deal with British distributor Abbey Home Entertainment to release their products in North America, including Bump's First Video.

In December 1993, VCI plc exited the North American market and sold Strand Home Video to the Handleman Company, who would absorb Strand into the company's Video Treasures division.

For a brief period in 1994, Strand released audio cassettes under the "Strand Music" imprint. Much like their VHS releases, Video Treasures handled physical distribution.

== Operations ==
Table showing the turnover made by geographical region since 1995
Turnover	United Kingdom	United States & Canada	Rest of the World
1995	£35,132,000		
1996	▼£29,958,000	£8,202,000	£1,578,000
1997	▼£28,181,000	▲£19,430,000	▼£829,000
1998	▼£26,738,000	▼£2,222,000	▼-115,000
1999	▲£36,044,000	▼£1,468,000	▲£584,000
2000	▲£40,666,000	▼£1,271,000	▼£154,000
2001	▼£37,943,000	▼£764,000	▲£311,000
2002	▲£50,558,000	▼£109,000	▼£193,000
2003	▲£65,803,000	▲£1,126,000	▼£92,000
2004			
2005	▲£118,007,000	▲£2,526,000	▲£7,726,000
2006	▲£128,050,000	▲£26,295,000	▲£11,719,000
2007	▼£124,817,000	▲£30,200,000	▲£14,200,000
2008	▼£112,123,000	▲£97,573,000	▲£15,600,000
2009	▲£115,746,000	▼£74,763,000	▲£20,193,000
2010	▲£124,870,000	▼£63,100,000	▲£26,500,000
2011	▼£104,522,000	▼£64,328,000	▼£19,012,000
2012	▼£97,118,000	▼£41,067,000	▲£19,198,000
2013	▼£69,196,000	▼£41,245,000	▼£16,060,000
2014	▼£55,048,000	▼£37,233,000	▼£14,098,000
2015	▼£38,961,000	▼£33,625,000	▲£14,193,000
2016	▼£32,199,000	▼£24,280,000	▼£8,287,000
2017	▼£26,062,000	▼£22,175,000	▼£4,464,000
2018	▼£22,001,000	▲£22,490,000	▼£4,162,000
2019	▼£18,593,000	▼£16,563,000	▼£1,622,000
2020	▼£13,935,000	▼£9,789,000	▲£2,157,000
2021	▼£13,703,000	▼£8,836,000	▼£1,717,000
