= Communications and Entertainment Limited =

Communications & Entertainment Limited
- Type: Home video distribution
- Genre: Various, depending on the label
- Founded: 1980; 46 years ago
- Founder: Publishing & Broadcasting Limited
- Defunct: 1999; 27 years ago
- Fate: Bankruptcy
- Headquarters: Australia

Communications & Entertainment Limited (CEL) was an Australian home video cassette distributor in the early 1980s. They were originally known as Publishing & Broadcasting Video, a unit of Publishing & Broadcasting Limited.

== History ==
The company was originally formed in 1980 by Kerry Packer as Star Video, a subsidiary of Publishing & Broadcasting Limited, who began selling movies to video-cassette. The company was introduced to the rental market in September 1981, and began expanding, sorting out agreements with Inter-Ocean Film Sales, and Filmways International, and the company would later reorganize as Publishing & Broadcasting Video, with other subsidiaries, like Video Channel, and The Duplication Center.

The company went on to be expanding in 1982 to start a partnership with the South Australian Film Corporation to form Australian Video, with Breaker Morant becoming the first movie to be issued on videocassette. Another piece of expansion came later that year when the company set up its own label Storytime Collection, whose titles were marketed to children from pre-school to 12, starting with a double feature set of videocassettes.

In 1983, Star Video/PBV signed a pact with Henson Associates subsidiary Muppet Home Video to release Muppet-oriented children's titles, starting with the Muppet television specials in time for the Easter season. PBV began expanding to launch a label specifically for exploitation and erotica films, Playaround Video in June 1983, with its original batch being double feature sets of 90-minute films.

A month later, Publishing & Broadcasting Video launched another label devoted to art films, called Star Video Film World Festival, which also focused on foreign language films, award-winning films, classic films and the like. The final piece of expansion came a month later when PBV licensed titles from top leaders Embassy Home Entertainment and MGM/UA Home Video to release its titles under two new labels, covering two major studios.

By the time PBV had become CEL, many of the labels were discontinued, or moved to another company (MGM/UA's releases were through Warner Home Video). CEL's labels included the aforementioned Muppet Home Video, Kidspics, and Thames Video (although this appears to be non-exclusive; some of Thames' video releases were through Pickwick Video). CEL also released RCA-Columbia Pictures Home Video releases prior to the joint venture with Hoyts.

In early 1984, Publishing and Broadcasting Video was reorganized, and its subsidiaries of Publishing and Broadcasting Limited were combined to form a new company, Communications & Entertainment Limited, with Consolidated Press & Holdings Ltd. obtaining a stake in the company.

In 1984, Communications and Entertainment Limited entered into an agreement with West Germany's licensor EuroVideo, in order that EuroVideo will distribute CEL's product in the West Germany market. Also that year, Communications and Entertainment Limited launched the film production and distribution agent Starscreen, and signed an agreement with Australian film distributor Greater Union Film Distributors, whereas Greater Union will handle the film distribution theatrically via joint venture project, and CEL would handle home video rights to the Starscreen titles. In 1986, CEL posted an increase in sales and an 81% rise on the company, which already held titles under the CEL Entertainment Revolution banner and decided to fight in their space with the launch of A Chorus Line, a theatrical release that was exhibited on major theatrical screens. That year, on 30 July 1986, Communications and Entertainment Limited decided to return to the rental market, after abandoning it in 1985 in favor of turning to the full-priced field.

On 27 August 1986, Communications and Entertainment Limited decided to expand on the New Zealand market in order to buy its privately owned production house, and a 30% stake in another Kiwi facility of the studio. On 29 October 1986 Les Smith, who had spent several years at the U.K. as head of Cannon Screen Entertainment (formerly Thorn EMI Screen Entertainment) had returned to Australia, this time at Communications and Entertainment Limited, to serve as head of its home entertainment division, and had to double out its efforts to make A Chorus Line, a rental release offered by CEL Home Video a winner.

In 1987, Communications and Entertainment Limited decided to link its entertainment interests of the Virgin Group to acquire the Rome Theater for $8.3 million, which was in association with Sydney backer Leon Fink as part of a $20 million entertainment complex of which details were disclosed. Also that year, the prospect of a Virgin-CEL merger decided that they chose to list "international buying power for theatrical, homevideo and television product, the Virgin name and international support, and the influx of Virgin titles", and the UK outfit decided to inherit CEL's established distribution structure and marketing muscle, and sent the partner of two entertainment interests in various countries that was originated in different regions, that enhanced the bottom line. The merger attempt was then aborted on 20 May 1987, and CEL is searching for a partner. In late June 1987, it attempted to sell the entire group to Taft-Hardie Group Pty. Ltd., which bid $42 million, but it never realised . That year, in early October 1987, a Melbourne-based company who was financing for the investment and the management groups, Quatro, following a last-minute $48 million bid for the company, won the bid to acquire the Communications and Entertainment Limited group, who supplanted a $42 million offer from the Taft-Hardie Group and saw Quatro played as a major player in the entertainment industry, and partner company Pro-Image Group increasing its production slate for the drama genre.

CEL Home Video had also bought Sundowner Film and Video Productions Pty. Limited. The company was publicly listed on the Australian Securities Exchange, but it was delisted in 1989 for failing to pay annual fees to the ASX. The company continued for a few years until 1999, when it filed for bankruptcy.
