= Zan (song) =

Single by Dir en Grey

from the album Gauze
- B-side: "Yurameki S.N.Y. Mix"
- Released: January 20, 1999
- Genre: Rock
- Length: 12:38
- Label: East West
- Composer: Kaoru
- Lyricist: Kyo
- Producer: Yoshiki

Dir en Grey singles chronology
"I'll" (1999)	"Zan" (1999)	"Akuro no Oka" "Yurameki" (1999)

"Zan" (残-ZAN-) is a single by Japanese rock band Dir en grey, released on January 20, 1999, by East West. It was ending theme for the Japanese television program Ninki-sha de ikou!.

It was released simultaneously with "Akuro no Oka" and "Yurameki" as the band's first releases on a major label. All three were re-recorded and included on the single "19990120", which was released on January 17, 2024, commemorating the 25th anniversary of the band's debut on a major label.

== Composition ==
"Zan" was produced by Yoshiki, leader of the band X Japan. The title track was composed by guitarist Kaoru, while the lyrics were written by vocalist Kyo. The B-side of the single is a remixed version of "Yurameki", a song composed by drummer Shinya.

== Reception and commercial performance ==
The single reached sixth place on Oricon Singles Chart and remained on chart for five weeks. In February 1999, it was certified gold by RIAJ for selling over 100,000 copies.

The music video for "Zan" was featured on the Japanese television program Music Station, which received much criticism from viewers outraged by the violent content of the clip.

== Track listing ==
All lyrics are written by Kyo.

No.	Title	Music	Length
1.	"Zan" (残-ZAN-)	Kaoru	5:06
2.	"Yurameki S.N.Y. Mix"	Shinya	5:51
Total length:			Kyo

== Personnel ==
- Dir en grey
  - Kyo – vocals, lyricist
  - Kaoru – guitar
  - Die – guitar
  - Toshiya – bass guitar
  - Shinya – drums
- Yoshiki – producer
