= Lotus (Dir En Grey song) =

Single by Dir En Grey

from the album Dum Spiro spero
- Released: January 26, 2011
- Recorded: 2010
- Genre: Gothic metal; alternative rock
- Length: 4:03
- Label: Firewall Div./SMEJ (JP); The End (US); Gan-Shin/Okami (EU)
- Producer(s): Dir En Grey

Dir En Grey singles chronology
"Hageshisa to, Kono Mune no Naka de Karamitsuita Shakunetsu no Yami" (2009)	"Lotus" (2011)	"Different Sense" (2011)

"Lotus" (stylized as "LOTUS") is the 26th single by Japanese band Dir En Grey, released on January 26, 2011, in Japan in a regular and limited edition, the limited copy featuring a bonus DVD.

The first B-side, "Obscure", is a re-recording of a track from band's fourth album, Vulgar. The second B-side is a live recording of the song "Reiketsu Nariseba", from the band's seventh album, Uroboros, recorded on July 20, 2010, at Shinkiba Studio Coast. The DVD included in the limited edition features three live songs taken from a concert held by the band on the following day.

== Track listing ==
=== CD ===
All lyrics are written by Kyo all music composed by Dir En Grey

No.	Title	Music	Length
1.	"Lotus"	Dir En Grey	4:01
2.	"Obscure"	Dir En Grey	3:34
3.	"Reiketsu Nariseba [Live]" (冷血なりせば [Live]; "If I Were Cold-Blooded [Live]")	Dir En Grey	3:58

=== DVD ===
No.	Title	Music	Length
1.	"Zan" (残; "Remains")	Dir En Grey
2.	"Lie Buried With A Vengeance"	Dir En Grey
3.	"Gyakujō Tannō Keloid Milk" (逆上堪能ケロイドミルク; "Raging Pleasures of Keloid Milk")	Dir En Grey

== Chart position ==
Chart	Peak position
Oricon daily singles	5
Oricon weekly singles	6
Oricon monthly singles	17
