= Different Sense =

Single by Dir En Grey

from the album Dum Spiro Spero
- Released: June 22, 2011
- Genre: Progressive death metal, nu deathcore
- Length: 5:04
- Label: Firewall Div./SMEJ (JP); The End (US); Gan-Shin/Okami (EU)
- Songwriter(s): Dir En Grey
- Producer(s): Dir En Grey

Dir En Grey singles chronology
"Lotus" (2011)	"Different Sense" (2011)	"Rinkaku" (2012)

"Different Sense" (stylized as "DIFFERENT SENSE") is the 27th single by Japanese heavy metal band Dir En Grey, released on June 22, 2011, in Japan in a regular and limited edition, the limited copy featuring a bonus DVD. It is the third single taken from the band's eighth studio album, Dum Spiro Spero. It peaked at #5 at the Oricon weekly charts.

The first B-side, "Tsumi to Kisei", is a remake of the song "Tsumi to Batsu" from the band's first album, Gauze. The second B-side is a live recording of the song "Red Soil", from the band's seventh album, Uroboros, recorded on November 9, 2010, at NAMBA Hatch. The DVD included in the limited edition features scenes from the recording of "Different Sense".

== Track listing ==
=== CD ===
All lyrics are written by Kyo all music composed by Dir En Grey

No.	Title	Music	Length
1.	"Different Sense"	Dir En Grey	5:04
2.	"Tsumi to Kisei" (罪と規制; "Crime and Regulation")	Dir En Grey	5:04
3.	"Red Soil [Live]"	Dir En Grey	3:32

=== DVD ===
No.	Title	Music	Length
1.	"Different Sense" (Scenes From Recording)	Dir En Grey
