= Dozing Green =

Single by Dir En Grey

from the album Uroboros
- Released: October 24, 2007 (JP); October 26, 2007 (DE); October 29, 2007 (UK/FR); October 31, 2007 (FI)
- Recorded: Studio Innig, Sony Music Studios, Sound Crew Studios, Studio Fine (1, 2); Pacifico Yokohama, April 21, 2007 (3)
- Genre: Alternative metal
- Length: 4:05
- Label: Firewall Div./SMEJ (JP); Gan-Shin (EU)
- Songwriter(s): Die, Toshiya, Kaoru, Kyo, Shinya
- Producer(s): Dir En Grey

Dir En Grey singles chronology
"Agitated Screams of Maggots" (2006)	"Dozing Green" (2007)	"Glass Skin" (2008)

"Dozing Green" (stylized as DOZING GREEN) is a single by Dir En Grey, released on October 24, 2007 in Japan and across Europe as well as in the iTunes Store until the end of October. The Japanese edition includes two b-sides, "Hydra -666-" and "Agitated Screams of Maggots [Live]". The European release features only "Dozing Green" and "Agitated Screams of Maggots", while the iTunes release is sold as the title track only.

The music video for "Dozing Green" shows cells from The Drifting Classroom by horror manga artist Kazuo Umezu. The music video of "Hydra -666-" can be found on In Weal or Woe.

"Dozing Green" is one of the two singles featured on Uroboros, along with "Glass Skin". Like its counterpart, the song is re-recorded in English for the album.

The music video for "Dozing Green" was voted the #1 video of the year 2008 on the MTV2 show Headbangers Ball.

== Music ==
For "Dozing Green", guitarist Kaoru performed on a PRS Custom 24, while Die recorded on a Fender Stratocaster in the studio. The music video however, shows Kaoru performing on the usual ESP Viper and Die on an ESP Eclipse.

The first b-side, "Hydra -666-", is a rearrangement of the song "Hydra" originally recorded for Macabre (2000). The "Agitated Screams of Maggots" live recording was performed at a concert limited to registered purchasers of the band's previous album, The Marrow of a Bone (2007).

== Track listing ==
All lyrics are written by Kyo; all music is composed by Dir En Grey

No.	Title	Length
1.	"Dozing Green"	4:05
2.	"Hydra -666-"	3:36
3.	"Agitated Screams of Maggots [Live]"	4:33

=== European version ===
All lyrics are written by Kyo; all music is composed by Dir En Grey

No.	Title	Length
1.	"Dozing Green"	4:05
2.	"Agitated Screams of Maggots [Live]"	4:33

== Personnel ==
- Dir En Grey – producer
  - Kyo – vocals
  - Kaoru – guitar
  - Die – guitar
  - Toshiya – bass guitar
  - Shinya – drums
- Yasushi "Koni-Young" Konishi – recording, mixing
- Miles Showell – mastering
- Dynamite Tommy – executive producer
- Takato Yamamoto – cover art
- Kazuya Nakajima, Taka Hashinoto – live recording
- Yoshinori Abe & Kaoru – Programming
