= Dum Spiro Spero (album) =

Studio album by Dir En Grey
- Released: August 2, 2011
- Recorded: 2010–2011
- Genres: Avant-garde metal; progressive death metal; doom metal; groove metal
- Length: 67:31
- Languages: Japanese, English
- Labels: Firewall Div./SMEJ; The End; Gan-Shin/Okami
- Producer: Dir En Grey

Dir En Grey chronology
Uroboros (2008)	Dum Spiro Spero (2011)	The Unraveling (2013)

Singles from Dum Spiro Spero
- 1. "Hageshisa to, Kono Mune no Naka de Karamitsuita Shakunetsu no Yami" Released: December 2, 2009; 2. "Lotus" Released: January 26, 2011; 3. "Different Sense" Released: June 22, 2011

Dum Spiro Spero (stylized as DUM SPIRO SPERO, lit. '"While I breathe, I hope"') is the eighth studio album by Japanese heavy metal band Dir En Grey, released on August 2, 2011 in the U.S., and in Japan on August 3.

The album's three singles, "Hageshisa to, Kono Mune no Naka de Karamitsuita Shakunetsu no Yami", "Lotus" and "Different Sense", have all been remastered from their original releases. "Rasetsukoku" is a re-recording of the original song found on their 2000 album Macabre.

The album was mixed by Tue Madsen and the mastering process was done by Alan Douches. Die stated in an interview with Visual Music Japan that working with these 2 was the most challenging part of the making process:

The most challenging part of the album-making process was probably the mixing, done by Tue Madsen, and the mastering process, done by Alan Douches. For the mastering, we wanted our sound to be as perfect as possible, exactly how we envisioned it. However, since we worked with a Western engineer, it was difficult to discuss and communicate our ideas solely through the internet. This is something that is better done in person. It was complicated to exchange ideas, piece everything together, and ensure that we achieved the sound we wanted. The mastering process was definitely the most challenging step in the recording.

== Release and promotion ==
It was released in both a single-CD edition, a deluxe edition digipak with two bonus tracks ("Rasetsukoku" and "Amon (Symphonic Ver.)"), and a limited edition featuring the deluxe digipak, a DVD and two LPs. This featured alternative versions of songs from the regular version of the album, remixes, interviews, studio footage, and more.

Music videos were released for all three singles; "Hageshisa to, Kono Mune no Naka de Karamitsuita Shakunetsu no Yami", "Lotus" and "Different Sense".

== Artwork ==
The album art was designed by the band's long-time artist Koji Yoda. This cover-art probably represents Tara, the "Mother of Liberation" in Tibetan Buddhism. The bamboo scenery is very meaningful to the band. According to guitarist Die, "the bamboo conveys the idea of sacredness and serenity [...]. Ultimately, it means to keep faith and hope alive even though you are living the worst: While I breathe, I hope."

== Critical reception ==
Professional ratings
Aggregate scores
Source	Rating
Metacritic	74/100
Review scores
Source	Rating
AllMusic	4/5 stars
PopMatters	9/10 stars
Revolver	3/5 stars
Rock Sound	8/10 stars

Dum Spiro Spero was met with positive reviews from music critics. At Metacritic (a review aggregator site which assigns a normalized rating out of 100 from music critics), based on 8 critics, the album has received a score of 74/100, which indicates "Generally favorable reviews".

In his review for AllMusic, Thom Jurek wrote that "Dir en Grey are a band in their own genre at this point, and Dum Spiro Spero is the farthest-reaching testament to establish that as fact more than opinion." He also acknowledged the wide variety of influences on the album, ranging from death metal and power metal to pop music, praising comparing vocalist Kyo's range to Mike Patton. Rock Sound described it as a "satisfyingly challenging, perpetually writhing musical beast".

PopMatters' Dane Prokofiev noted in a positive review that "their music is eclectic and hard to classify into any one subgenre—except that they have the added fangirl-ish oomph of flashy appearances, thanks to their visual-kei roots". Like Jurek, he praised Kyo as a gifted singer, particularly for his range. He also singled out bassist Toshiya as deserving of praise for his performance on Dum Spiro Spero, "as his throbbing bass lines complement the technical guitar riffs well by adding a groovy kind of bad-ass attitude to the overall feel of the music. Without him, the guitar melodies of Kaoru and Die would most certainly sound naked and hollow."

== Track listing ==
All lyrics are written by Kyo; all music is composed by Dir En Grey.

Disc one
No.	Title	Length
1.	"Kyōkotsu no Nari" (狂骨の鳴り; "Cries of Kyōkotsu")	1:58
2.	"The Blossoming Beelzebub"	7:35
3.	"Different Sense"	5:03
4.	"Amon"	4:03
5.	"'Yokusō ni Dreambox' Aruiwa Seijuku no Rinen to Tsumetai Ame" (「欲巣にDREAMBOX」あるいは成熟の理念と冷たい雨; "'Dreambox in a Covetous Nest', or the Idea of Maturity and Cold Rain")	4:49
6.	"Jūyoku" (獣慾; "Carnal Desire")	3:28
7.	"Shitataru Mōrō" (滴る朦朧; "Trickling Obscurity")	4:02
8.	"Lotus"	4:03
9.	"Diabolos"	9:51
10.	"Akatsuki" (暁; "Dawn")	3:33
11.	"Decayed Crow"	3:48
12.	"Hageshisa to, Kono Mune no Naka de Karamitsuita Shakunetsu no Yami" (激しさと、この胸の中で絡み付いた灼熱の闇; "The Violence and the Darkness of the Burning Heat Entwines In My Heart")	4:03
13.	"Vanitas" (Emptiness)	5:27
14.	"Ruten no Tō" (流転の塔; "Tower of Vicissitudes")	4:27
Total length:		67:31

Limited edition: disc two
No.	Title	Length
1.	"Rasetsukoku" (羅刹国; "Rakshasa Country")	4:41
2.	"Amon (Symphonic Ver.)"	5:02
3.	"Ruten no Tō (Unplugged Ver.)" (流転の塔 (Unplugged Ver.))	4:56
4.	"Diabolos (Demo 2010, Short Ver.)"	5:01
5.	"Akatsuki (Demo 2010)" (暁 (Demo2010))	3:29
6.	"The Blossoming Beelzebub (Remix)" (Remixed by Kaoru)	6:24
7.	"'Yokusō ni Dreambox' Aruiwa Seijuku no Rinen to Tsumetai Ame (Remix)" (「欲巣にDREAMBOX」あるいは成熟の理念と冷たい雨 (Remix), remixed by Toshiya)	5:19
8.	"Shitataru Mōrō (Remix)" (滴る朦朧 (Remix), remixed by Shinya)	4:02
9.	"Akatsuki (Remix)" (暁 (Remix), remixed by Die)	4:23
10.	"Decayed Crow (Remix)" (Remixed by Kyo)	3:40
Total length:		49:95

Japanese Deluxe Edition DVD
No.	Title	Length
1.	"Recording & Interview"
2.	"Hageshisa to, Kono Mune no Naka de Karamitsuita Shakunetsu no Yami" (激しさと、この胸の中で絡み付いた灼熱の闇, Scenes From A Knot only Tour2011 The Decomposition of the Moon)
3.	"Lotus" (Scenes From A Knot only Tour2011 The Decomposition of the Moon)
4.	"Different Sense" (Scenes From A Knot only Tour2011 The Decomposition of the Moon)
5.	"Juuyoku" (獣慾, Scenes From A Knot only Tour2011 The Decomposition of the Moon at Kyoto Fanj on May 26, 2011)
6.	"Vanitas" (In-Studio Footage)
7.	"Zan" (残; "Remains", PV)

== Personnel ==
Dir en grey

- Kyo – vocals
- Kaoru – guitar, programming
- Die – guitar
- Toshiya – bass
- Shinya – drums

Additional

- Takumi – programming
- Dynamite Tommy – executive producer
- Alan Douches – mastering engineer
- Tue Madsen – mixing engineer
- Emi "Jewels" Sugiyama – liner notes translation

== Release history ==
Region	Date	Label	Format	Catalog
United States	August 2, 2011	The End Records	2-LP	TE204-1
United States	August 2, 2011	The End Records	Compact disc (Limited)	TE210-2
United States	August 2, 2011	The End Records	Compact disc	
Japan	August 3, 2011	Firewall, Sony Music Entertainment Japan	2-CD album with bonus DVD, 2-LP box set (Limited)	SFCD-0092-96
Japan	August 3, 2011	Firewall, Sony Music Entertainment Japan	Compact disc	SFCD-0097
Europe	August 5, 2011	Okami Records, Gan-Shin, Rough Trade	Compact disc	OKCD-0006
Europe	August 5, 2011	Okami Records, Gan-Shin, Rough Trade	Compact disc (Limited)	OKCD-0005
Europe	August 5, 2011	Okami Records, Gan-Shin, Rough Trade	12" LP album	OKLP-0002

== Charting ==
Country	Provider(s)	Peak position	Sales/ shipments
Japan Weekly Albums	Oricon	4	37,586
Billboard Japan Top Albums	Billboard Japan	6	
United States Billboard 200	Billboard	135	3,900
United States Top Heatseekers	Billboard	2	3,900
United States Top Independent	Billboard	22	3,900
United States Top Rock Albums	Billboard	39	3,900
United States Top Hard Rock Albums	Billboard	9	3,900
