= Hageshisa to, Kono Mune no Naka de Karamitsuita Shakunetsu no Yami =

Single by Dir En Grey

from the album Dum Spiro Spero
- Released: December 2, 2009
- Genre: Progressive death metal, deathcore
- Length: 4:03
- Label: Firewall Div./SMEJ (JP); The End (US); Gan-Shin/Okami (EU)
- Producer(s): Dir En Grey

Dir En Grey singles chronology
"Glass Skin" (2008)	"Hageshisa to, Kono Mune no Naka de Karamitsuita Shakunetsu no Yami" (2009)	"Lotus" (2011)

"Hageshisa to, Kono Mune no Naka de Karamitsuita Shakunetsu no Yami" (激しさと、この胸の中で絡み付いた灼熱の闇, "The Violence and the Darkness of the Burning Heat Entwines In My Heart") is the 25th single by Japanese band Dir En Grey, released on December 2, 2009, in Japan in a regular and limited edition, the limited copy featuring a bonus DVD. It also appears remastered as the twelfth track on Dum Spiro Spero. The single peaked at no. 2 on the Oricon weekly singles chart, making this the band's highest-charting song.

The first B-side, "Zan", is a re-recording of a track from band's first album, Gauze. The second B-side, "Shokubeni (Shot In One Take)" is a re-recording of a track from the band's fourth album, Vulgar, recorded in one take live in the studio.

The single is included in the Saw 3D movie soundtrack along with fellow Japanese artists Boom Boom Satellites and Wagdug Futuristic Unity. The song was also featured as downloadable content for the video game Rock Band 3 through the Rock Band Network 2.0 catalog.

== Track listing ==
=== CD ===
All lyrics are written by Kyo, all music composed by Dir En Grey

No.	Title	Music	Length
1.	"Hageshisa to, Kono Mune no Naka de Karamitsuita Shakunetsu no Yami" (激しさと, この胸の中で絡み付いた灼熱の闇; "The Violence and the Darkness of the Burning Heat Entwines In My Heart")	Dir En Grey	4:04
2.	"Zan" (残; "Remains")	Dir En Grey	4:32
3.	"Shokubeni (Shot In One Take)" (蝕紅 (Shot In One Take); "Ruined Crimson (Shot In One Take)")	Dir En Grey	4:27

=== DVD ===
No.	Title	Music	Length
1.	"Shokubeni (Shot In One Take)" (蝕紅 (Shot In One Take))	Dir En Grey	4:27
2.	"Hageshisa to, Kono Mune no Naka de Karamitsuita Shakunetsu no Yami (Scenes From Recording)" (激しさと、この胸の中で絡み付いた灼熱の闇 (Scenes From Recording))	Dir En Grey
3.	"Hageshisa to, Kono Mune no Naka de Karamitsuita Shakunetsu no Yami (In-Studio Footage)" (激しさと、この胸の中で絡み付いた灼熱の闇 (In-Studio Footage))	Dir En Grey	4:27

== Chart position ==
Chart	Peak position
Oricon daily singles	2
Oricon weekly singles	2
Oricon monthly singles	11
