= Glass Skin =

Single by Dir En Grey

from the album Uroboros
- Released: September 10, 2008
- Recorded: Sony Building, Tokyo; Studio Innig; Sound Crew Studio; Studio Fine; Studio Sunshine; Prime Sound Studio Form; Wang Guang RecLabs; Studio Kolkhoz (2007)
- Genre: Alternative rock
- Length: 16:56
- Label: Firewall Div./SMEJ
- Songwriter(s): Die, Toshiya, Kaoru, Kyo, Shinya
- Producer(s): Dir En Grey

Dir En Grey singles chronology
"Dozing Green" (2007)	"Glass Skin" (2008)	"Hageshisa to..." (2009)

"Glass Skin" (stylized as GLASS SKIN) is a single by Dir En Grey, released on September 10, 2008 in Japan in a regular and limited edition, the limited copy featuring a bonus live track as well as a sticker of the band and a poster. The single was released as a digital download on September 17, 2008.

"Glass Skin" is one of the two singles to be featured on the album Uroboros, along with its predecessor "Dozing Green". Like its counterpart, the song is re-recorded in English for the album.

The artwork on the cover, booklet, and accompanying promotional materials of "Glass Skin", as well as some artwork used on the official website was created by Osaka-based artist Genta Kosumi.

== Music ==
The first B-side, "Undecided", is a rerecording of a track from band's third album, Kisou. The second B-side, "Agitated Screams of Maggots -Unplugged-", is an unplugged arrangement of the band's 2006 single. Another B-side for the single, included only with the limited edition, is a live version of Ryōjoku no Ame; the recording is from a concert at Yokohama Blitz on May 23, 2008.

== Music video ==
The music video for "Glass Skin" was premiered on MTV in Japan. It is largely computer generated, but features images of the band.

== Track listing ==
All lyrics are written by Kyo; all music is composed by Dir En Grey*

No.	Title	Length
1.	"Glass Skin"	4:30
2.	"Undecided"	4:58
3.	"Agitated Screams of Maggots -Unplugged-"	3:08
4.	"Ryōjoku no Ame [Live]" (凌辱の雨 [Live]; "Rain of Violation [Live]", Live take at Yokohama Blitz on May 23, 2008)	4:19

* Although "Undecided" is originally credited with Die's composition, this arrangement is credited to the band as a whole.

== Personnel ==
- Dir En Grey – producer, composer
  - Kyo – vocals, lyricist
  - Kaoru – guitar
  - Die – guitar
  - Toshiya – bass guitar
  - Shinya – drums
- Tadasuke – piano (Track 3)
- Kaoru & Yoshinori Abe – programming
- Miles Showell – mastering
- Yasushi "Koni-Young" Konishi – recording, mixing
- Akinori Kaizaki – co-recording
- Kazuya Nakajima – live recording
- Taku Hashimoto – live recording
- Genta Kosumi – artwork illustration
- Hiroshi "Dynamite Tommy" Tomioka – executive producer

== Chart position ==
Chart	Peak position
Oricon daily singles	4
Oricon weekly singles	6
