= I'll (Dir En Grey song) =

"-I'll-"

Single by Dir En Grey
- Released: August 12, 1998
- Recorded: Cheers Studio; B-1 Studio
- Length: 9:00
- Label: Free-Will (FWR-005)
- Producer(s): Dir En Grey

Dir En Grey singles chronology
"Jealous" (1998)	"-I'll-" (1998)	"Akuro no Oka" (1999)

"-I'll-" is a single released by Dir En Grey on August 12, 1998. The video of the title track would later be featured on the Mōsō Tōkakugeki VHS. The ephonym song is featured as the opening theme of the Urayasu Radical Family anime series.

The song brought popularity to the band, reaching a high position on Oricon charts despite being an indie group.

== Commercial performance ==
The single peaked at 7th position on Oricon Singles Chart and stayed on chart for ten weeks. It sold 150,040 copies while on chart.

== Track listing ==
All lyrics are written by Kyo..

No.	Title	Music	Length
1.	"-I'll-"	Dir En Grey	4:31
2.	"Toriko" (虜; "Prisoner")	Shinya	4:29

== Personnel ==
- Dir En Grey – producer
  - Kyo – vocals
  - Kaoru – guitar
  - Die – guitar
  - Toshiya – bass guitar
  - Shinya – drums
- KIYOSHI (D≒SIRE/Kreis) – producer
