= Uroboros (album) =

2008 studio album by Dir En Grey

Studio album by Dir En Grey
- Released: November 11, 2008
- Recorded: 2007–2008
- Studio: Studio Innig; Sony Music Studios; Sound Crew Studio; Studio Fine; Studio Sunshine; Prime Sound Studio Form; Wang GuangRecLabs; Towerside; Studio Somewhere; Studio Kolkhoz
- Genre: Avant-garde metal; progressive metal; death metal; groove metal
- Length: 58:54
- Language: Japanese, English
- Label: Firewall Div./SMEJ, The End, Gan-Shin
- Producer: Dir En Grey

Dir En Grey chronology
The Marrow of a Bone (2007)	Uroboros (2008)	Dum Spiro Spero (2011)

Singles from Uroboros
- 1. "Dozing Green" Released: October 24, 2007; 2. "Glass Skin" Released: September 10, 2008

Uroboros (stylized as UROBOROS) is the seventh studio album by Japanese heavy metal band Dir En Grey. It was released on November 11, 2008, in the United States by The End Records and, due to the time difference, on November 12, 2008, in Japan through Firewall and European releases by Gan-Shin. A remastered and expanded edition was released in 2012, featuring new and reworked tracks. The album was remastered by Tue Madsen who also produced their following album Dum Spiro Spero.

The album is named after the Ouroboros symbol, which is a dragon or snake figure depicted in a full circle consuming itself. The symbol represents continuity and the cycle of power, emphasizing the theme of reincarnation, an idea propagated heavily by the band during promotion.

The album art, designed by the band's long-time artist Koji Yoda, was conceived with inspiration from King Crimson's 1970 album Lizard.

== Background and production ==
Following the finale of their 2007 touring, much of the song writing was completed on an individual basis in January and February 2008, without the members meeting to collaborate. The original announcement of recording was slated for the beginning of 2008, while it was later announced that the album began pre-production in March 2008. The members regrouped after two months of solitary work and shared their independently developed tracks, with guitarist Kaoru saying the intent was to show "I'm making this song right now", with the intent of producing a larger variety of songs. Recording of the first tracks then began in the spring in the Sony Building in Tokyo. Dir En Grey later returned to the pre-production phase for the remaining tracks of the album.

The band recorded with many new instruments, including mandolin, congas, electric sitar, and biwa to create a unique sound, and vocalist Kyo sets emphasis on "non-screaming vocals," accentuating softer composition, while still blending in his unique screams, screeches, and polished death metal growls. For the album, Kaoru and Die utilized several guitar models and techniques; an unconventional method, some of the guitars were recorded directly from amps.

== Music ==
Uroboros is "stuffed with themes of 'guilt and reincarnation' as well as 'the past, present and future of Dir En Grey'", as guitarist Kaoru stated in a press release. This was later echoed in CDJapan's album overview, calling the album "a sort of return for the band, revisiting the pre-Withering to Death. era." Kaoru also included that the album would again be a progression into "heavier and darker" sounds than prior albums, as well as an "oriental and religious mood".

In an interview in the band's regular fan-club magazine, Haiiro no Ginka, interviewer You Masuda described the style in comparison with the band's preceding album, The Marrow of a Bone:

I'm actually starting to feel troubled. I don't know how I could describe your music in words. For example, Marrow of a Bone is a work that has elements of metal, but the songs I just heard now are difficult to describe. If I were to express these songs, it would be something close to being acoustic. If you put it in a strange way, it's close to something like, 'What happens if Thom Yorke does metal?'

— Yuichi "You" Masuda, Haiiro no Ginka

With the announcement of an American release date, guitarist Kaoru expressed further opinion on the album's style, saying the album would experiment with oriental sounds, and the "hard and heavy" atmosphere found on The Marrow of a Bone would be absent, instead favoring more elegant instrumentation and "something that lets you visualize several scenes".

Kaoru also said in an interview with Visual Music Japan that:

On several songs, we used an electric zither, which brings something new and quite interesting, although the essence of the songs we were aiming for primarily revolves around guitars. For example, we used various objects to scrape and play the guitar strings. On few tracks, we also tried recording the sound of the guitars directly from the amplifier. In the end, it was a unique and really fun experience. On the album, Shinya even played congas.

Together with the band's label, a California-based radio station, Indie 103.1, premiered music from Uroboros on October 19, 26 and November 2. The tracks "Red Soil" and "Dozing Green" were played on the first night, with "Glass Skin" chosen on the second, available both as a radio broadcast and internet radio show. On the 2 November broadcast, the band debuted "Gaika, Chinmoku ga Nemuru Koro".

During promotion, the track "Stuck Man" was referred to as "Third Time Does the Trick", however the title was changed before the final track listing was revealed.

In harmony with the Asian themes in the album, the first two tracks titles, "Sa Bir" and "Vinushka" are derived from the Tibetan language and Russian language respectively. The former referring to the movement of the Earth, while the latter is a "word from Russian origin" used "to talk about elements that are linked to sins," according to Visual Music Japan's interview Kaoru did with journalist Mandah Frénot. "Vinushka", which is a form of the word "vina" (Russian: вина), can be translated as "guilt".

== Release ==
A first time for the band, the album debuted in the United States, being released in four editions. The album is available via digital download, a standard CD, a deluxe limited edition release packaged in a cardboard sleeve and slipcase with both a CD and DVD, and finally in a twelve-inch LP with a card to download the digital release. The CD and DVD edition come with a series of live videos on the DVD, rather than making-of footage from the Japanese release. The live footage includes "Repetition of Hatred", "Agitated Screams of Maggots", and "Hydra -666-" from the band's Zepp Tokyo concert from 22 December 2007, "Dead Tree" from Wacken Open Air 2007, and "Dozing Green" from a show on Tour 07 The Marrow of a Bone; tracks one through four were all previously included on In Weal or Woe.

The album was released in three editions in Japan; a standard edition, a limited edition and a deluxe edition. The standard edition includes only the main album, while the limited edition includes a bonus disc with unplugged tracks and internationally exclusive tracks. The deluxe edition contains both discs packaged with the limited edition, as well as a bonus DVD containing a documentary of the album's conception, and two LPs.

The original intent of the band's record label was to press an approximate amount of deluxe editions, however, due to extremely rapid sales and high demand, the edition was opened to a pre-order limit of August 16, after which no more copies were pressed and only leftover pressings were commercially available.

The European release, handled by Gan-Shin, began in France on November 12, simultaneously with the Japanese release. The album is available throughout Europe in two editions; the regular that includes only the album's feature tracks, while the limited edition includes three bonus tracks.

A remastered and expanded edition was released in 2012, featuring new and reworked tracks. The album was remastered by Tue Madsen who also produced their following album Dum Spiro Spero. This featured an extended version of "Sa Bir", a special version of "Bugaboo" that was previously releases only on the vinyl version that came with the [2CD + 1DVD + 2LP] limited edition of Uroboros, and Japanese versions of "Dozing Green" and "Glass Skin". In addition, "Hydra -666-" is also included, previously only available as a B-side to the "Dozing Green" single.

== Reception ==
Professional ratings
Review scores
Source	Rating
About.com	3.5/5 stars
Allmusic	4.5/5 stars
Kerrang!	(KKK) 2008
Metal Hammer	8/10 stars
NEO Magazine	#53
ReGen	5/5 stars
Revolver	2008
Rock Sound	8/10 stars

Uroboros quickly received positive reviews, being acknowledged as an experimental album for the band, and a defined shift back to the band's roots, while retaining the metal elements of the recent works. Allmusic chose Uroboros as an "AMG Album Pick", praising the release for its variety and willingness to escape the band's stereotypes; Another oft-mentioned aspect is the continued use of Japanese lyrics by Kyo; however, the album was also advertised with specific attention to the English revisions of "Dozing Green" and "Glass Skin", while other tracks also had heavy use of English. Several professional reviews have said the use of Japanese is something that could preclude the band having mainstream popularity, but some approve of the band's consistency with their native language. A negative that some reviewers identified is repetitiveness in the album's style, though this was interpreted as a strong point by JD Considine of Revolver.

[Uroboros features] muscular funk licks, soaring power-ballad melodies, and creepy atmospherics; moments that have the slow intensity of a dirge, and others that rush with the hell-bent-for-leather abandon of classic metal. Most amazing of all, [Dir En Grey] manages to do all this while maintaining such a strong sense of structure that the album almost feels like one continuous song.

— JD Considine, Revolver

In its debut release week, the album sold 6,054 copies and reached number 114 on the Billboard 200 albums chart. This marked Dir En Grey's first time ranking on the United States' central music chart. In the band's native country, the album was met with high sales, exceeding thirty-seven thousand, which brought the album to a number four spot on the Oricon chart. This was Dir En Grey's best performance since Kisou (2002).

== Track listing ==
All lyrics are written by Kyo; all music is composed by Dir En Grey

No.	Title	Length
1.	"Sa Bir (Interlude)"	2:00
2.	"Vinushka"	9:37
3.	"Red Soil"	3:24
4.	"Dōkoku to Sarinu" (慟哭と去りぬ; "It Ends in Lamentation")	3:48
5.	"Toguro" (蜷局; "Whorl")	3:57
6.	"Glass Skin"	4:27
7.	"Stuck Man"	3:34
8.	"Reiketsu Nariseba" (冷血なりせば; "If I Were Cold-Blooded")	3:33
9.	"Ware, Yami Tote…" (我、闇とて･･･; "For I Am Darkness…")	7:01
10.	"Bugaboo"	4:43
11.	"Gaika, Chinmoku ga Nemuru Koro" (凱歌、沈黙が眠る頃; "Paean, the Time When Silence Sleeps")	4:22
12.	"Dozing Green"	4:05
13.	"Inconvenient Ideal"	4:23
Total length:		58:54

=== Bonus tracks ===
Japanese vinyl edition
No.	Title	Length
11.	"Bugaboo Respira" (Unlisted, placed after Bugaboo)	2:13

American versions
No.	Title	Length
14.	"Glass Skin" (Japanese lyrics version) (Limited edition only)	4:28
15.	"Dozing Green" (Japanese lyrics version)	4:08
Total length:		08:36

American vinyl edition
No.	Title	Length
14.	"Dozing Green" (Japanese version)	4:08
15.	"Undecided" (B-side from "Glass Skin" single)	4:58
Total length:		09:06

European limited edition
No.	Title	Length
14.	"Glass Skin" (Japanese version)	4:28
15.	"Dozing Green" (Japanese version)	4:08
16.	"Agitated Screams of Maggots -Unplugged-" (B-side from "Glass Skin" single)	3:08
Total length:		11:44

=== Bonus Discs ===
Japanese limited and deluxe edition
No.	Title	Length
1.	"Ware, Yami Tote…" (我、闇とて･･･; "For I Am Darkness…", unplugged)	6:39
2.	"Inconvenient Ideal" (Unplugged)	4:23
3.	"Red Soil" (Unplugged)	3:25
4.	"Dozing Green (Before Construction Version)" (Deluxe edition only)	4:19
5.	"Dozing Green (Japanese Lyrics Re-mastering)" (Deluxe edition only)	4:08
6.	"Glass Skin (Japanese Lyrics Re-mastering)" (Deluxe edition only)	4:29
Total length:		27:38

Japanese Deluxe Edition DVD
No.	Title	Length
1.	"Recording and Interviews"
2.	"Toguro" (蜷局; "Whorl", Shot In One Take)
3.	"Dozing Green" (Shot In One Take)

American Limited Edition DVD
No.	Title	Length
1.	"Repetition of Hatred" (Live Take at Zepp Tokyo, 22 December 2007)
2.	"Agitated Screams of Maggots" (Live Take at Zepp Tokyo, 22 December 2007)
3.	"Hydra -666-" (Live Take at Zepp Tokyo, 22 December 2007)
4.	"Dead Tree" (Live Take at Wacken Open Air, 4 August 2007)
5.	"Dozing Green" (Live Take on Tour07 The Marrow of a Bone, 2007 (studio audio))

=== Remastered & Expanded ===
All lyrics are written by Kyo; all music is composed by Dir En Grey

No.	Title	Length
1.	"Sa Bir (Extended Version)"	3:52
2.	"Vinushka"	9:37
3.	"Red Soil"	3:24
4.	"Dōkoku to Sarinu" (慟哭と去りぬ; "It Ends in Lamentation")	3:48
5.	"Toguro" (蜷局; "Whorl")	3:58
6.	"Glass Skin"	4:28
7.	"Stuck Man"	3:35
8.	"Reiketsu Nariseba" (冷血なりせば; "If I Were Cold-Blooded")	3:33
9.	"Ware, Yami Tote…" (我、闇とて･･･; "For I Am Darkness…")	7:03
10.	"Hydra -666-"	3:40
11.	"Bugaboo Respira"	2:09
12.	"Bugaboo"	4:44
13.	"Gaika, Chinmoku ga Nemuru Koro" (凱歌、沈黙が眠る頃; "Paean, the Time When Silence Sleeps")	4:22
14.	"Dozing Green"	4:06
15.	"Inconvenient Ideal"	4:22
Total length:		63:53

== Personnel ==
- Dir En Grey – producer, composer
  - Kyo – vocals, lyricist
  - Kaoru – electric guitar, acoustic guitar, electric sitar, backing vocals
  - Die – electric guitar, acoustic guitar, mandolin, backing vocals
  - Toshiya – bass guitar, biwa, backing vocals
  - Shinya – drums, congas, percussion
- Jun Fukamachi – piano, pipe organ (unplugged 1 & 2)
- Tadasuke – piano (unplugged 3)
- Yoshinori Abe – programming
- Toshiaki Ishii – programming
- Hiroshi "Dynamite Tommy" Tomioka – executive producer
- Yasushi "Koni-Young" Konishi – recording, mixing (feature disc)
- Akinori Kaizaki – mixing (unplugged disc)
- Ted Jensen – mastering (feature disc)
- Kazushige Yamazaki – mastering (unplugged 1, 2 & 3, "Dozing Green (Before Construction Ver.)")
- Hiroyuki Kondo – director, filming
- Mitsuhiko Koechi – video lighting
- Koji Yoda – art direction, art design
- Toshio Sakurai – art design
- Satoshi Mizuno – art design
- Genta Kosumi – illustration
- Takato Yamamoto – illustration
- Shigeo Kikuchi – photography
- Jewels – translation
- Yuichi "You" Masuda – interviewer (deluxe DVD)

== Release history ==
Region	Date	Label	Format	Catalog
United States	November 11, 2008	The End Records	Digipak CD and DVD (Limited)	TE123-1
United States	November 11, 2008	The End Records	Digital download	N/A
United States	November 11, 2008	The End Records	Compact disc	TE123-2
United States	November 11, 2008	The End Records	12" LP album	TE124-2
Japan	November 12, 2008	Firewall, Sony Music Entertainment Japan	2-CD album with bonus DVD, 2-LP box set (Limited)	SFCD-0058-62
Japan	November 12, 2008	Firewall, Sony Music Entertainment Japan	2-CD album (Limited)	SFCD-0063-64
Japan	November 12, 2008	Firewall, Sony Music Entertainment Japan	Compact disc	SFCD-0065
Europe	November 12, 2008	Gan-Shin	Compact disc	FWEAL00-04
Europe	November 12, 2008	Gan-Shin	Compact disc (Limited)	FWEAL00-05

== Charting ==
Country	Provider(s)	Peak position	Sales/ shipments
Japan Weekly Albums	Oricon	4	43,316 (as of December 1, 2008)
Billboard Japan Top Albums	Billboard Japan	4	
United States Billboard 200	Billboard	114	6,054
United States Top Heatseekers	Billboard	1	6,054
United States Top Independent	Billboard	9	6,054
United States Top Internet Albums	Billboard	8	6,054
United States Top Hard Rock	Billboard	17	6,054
United States Top Comprehensive	Billboard	135	6,054
