= Gauze (album) =

Dir en grey album

Studio album by Dir En Grey
- Released: July 28, 1999
- Studios: Warner Music; Greenbird; One Voice Komazawa; Epicurus; Tokyo Bay; Victor; One on One (Los Angeles)
- Genre: Alternative rock
- Length: 64:47
- Languages: Japanese; English; German
- Label: East West Japan
- Producers: Dir En Grey; Yoshiki

Dir En Grey chronology
Missa (1997)	Gauze (1999)	Macabre (2000)

Alternative cover
- 2001 re-issue cover

Singles from Gauze
- 1. "Akuro no Oka" Released: January 20, 1999; 2. "Yurameki" Released: January 20, 1999; 3. "Zan" Released: January 20, 1999; 4. "Cage" Released: May 26, 1999; 5. "Yokan" Released: July 14, 1999

Professional ratings
Review scores
Source	Rating
Ultimate Guitar	9/10
CD Journal	(Positive)

Gauze (stylized as GAUZE) is the debut studio album by Japanese heavy metal band Dir En Grey. The album was originally released on July 28, 1999, as a standard version with a thick CD case, 36-page booklet with the CD reading surface painted red, through East West Japan. An initial limited version was released on the same day, including a translucent red sleeve with a cloud pattern, 12-page picture booklet, a 36-page lyrics booklet, and the red painted CD in a maxi-CD single case for a sticker price of ¥3,059 ($27.87). The album was later re-issued as standard version only, with a silver disc on October 31, 2001, through Free-Will. Five tracks were produced by X Japan co-founder Yoshiki, all of which had been previously released as singles.

The lyrics booklet features two pages for each song; one features the lyrics, while the facing page features a picture and a small poem or verse, as a companion piece.

== Track listing ==
All lyrics are written by Kyo.

No.	Title	Music	Length
1.	"Gauze -Mode of Adam-"	Dir En Grey	2:07
2.	"Schwein no Isu" (Schweinの椅子; "Chair of the Pig")	Die	3:31
3.	"Yurameki" (ゆらめき; "Waver")	Shinya	5:05
4.	"Raison Detre"	Shinya, Toshiya	4:48
5.	"304-gōshitsu, Hakushi no Sakura" (304号室、白死の桜; "Room 304, Cherry Blossoms of White Death")	Die	5:18
6.	"Cage"	Kaoru	5:35
7.	"Tsumi to Batsu" (蜜と唾; "Crime and Punishment")	Kaoru	5:08
8.	"Mazohyst of Decadence"	Kaoru	9:22
9.	"Yokan" (予感; "Premonition")	Die	4:39
10.	"Mask"	Kaoru	4:25
11.	"Zan" (残-ZAN-; "Remains")	Kaoru	5:03
12.	"Akuro no Oka" (アクロの丘; "Hill of the Acropolis")	Kaoru	9:42
13.	"Gauze -Mode of Eve-"	Dir En Grey	0:04
Total length:			64:47

=== Notes ===
- "Raison Detre" is French for "reason for being" (raison d'être with conventional diacritics).
- The kanji of the seventh track are printed in reverse on the packaging, transliterating as "Mitsu to Tsuba" (honey and saliva). "Tsumi to Batsu" (crime and punishment), however, is still considered the official title. This peculiarity is an example for lyricist Kyo's penchant for wordplay.
- "Mazohyst" in "Mazohyst of Decadence" is a Romanization of the Japanese loanword for masochist, マゾヒスト ("mazohisuto".)
- Most of the song "Gauze -Mode of Eve-" is a hidden track at the end of "Akuro no Oka". "Akuro no Oka"'s actual length is 8:30. The four second 13th track is a Red Book standard designed to accommodate the hidden outro.
- A re-recording of "残-ZAN-", simply titled 残 (Zan), appears as a b-side on the 2009 single "Hageshisa to, Kono Mune no Naka de Karamitsuita Shakunetsu no Yami".
- A remake of "残-ZAN-", also titled 残 (Zan), appears on the 2024 remake single "19990120" along with the other two major debut singles, "Yurameki" and "Akuro no Oka". The single's title refers to the original release date of the three debut singles, January 20, 1999.
- A remake of "Tsumi to Batsu" was released in 2011 on iTunes and as a live-limited CD. A censored version, aptly titled 罪と規制 (Tsumi to Kisei, Crime and Regulation), appears as a b-side on the 2011 single "Different Sense".
- A remake of "Mazohyst of Decadence" appears on the second disc of the limited and deluxe editions of the 2022 album Phalaris.
- Remakes of "Cage" and "Yokan" appear as b-sides on the 2024 single "The Devil In Me".

== Personnel ==
Musicians

- Dir En Grey – producer, arrangements
  - Kyo – vocals, lyricist
  - Kaoru – guitar
  - Die – guitar
  - Toshiya – bass guitar
  - Shinya – drums
- Shelly Berg – violin ("Akuro no Oka")
- Baez FX. – breathing (Zan)

Additional chorus on Schwein no isu

- Matsuyama
- Mikio
- Okuyama
- Ōsaka
- Shintani
- You (Death Side)
- Zigyaku
- バンチUFO

on Mazohyst Of Decadence

- Kazue Tatsumi

Technique

- Yoshiki – producer, arrangements ("Yurameki", "Cage", "Yokan", "-Zan-" and "Akuro no Oka")
- Toru Yamazaki – co-producer ("Yurameki", "Cage", "Yokan", "-Zan-" and "Akuro no Oka")
- Dynamite Tommy, Toshiyuki Takano, Norio Higuchi, and Takeyasu Hashizume – executive producers
- Joe Chiccarelli – mixing (on Yurameki)
- Eric Westfall – (on Cage)
- Bill Kennedy – (on Zan)
- Stan Katayama – (on Akuro no Oka)
- Shelly Berg, Tom Halm & Yoshiki – string arrangements ("Cage" and "Akuro no Oka")
- Michio – artwork

== Charts ==
Chart performance for Gauze
Chart (1999)	Peak position
Japanese Albums (Oricon)	5
