= Madmans Esprit =

South Korean metal band

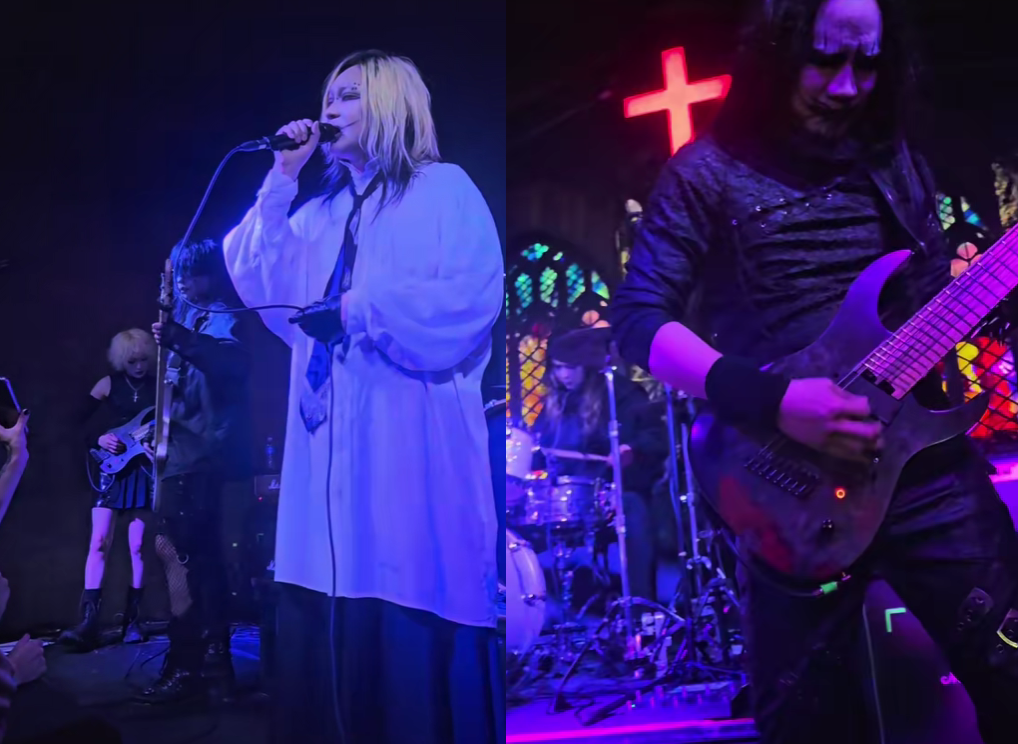
- Madmans Esprit in São Paulo, Brazil, in April 21, 2025.

Background information
- Origin: Seoul, South Korea
- Genres: Avant-garde metal; extreme metal; post-rock
- Years active: 2010–present
- Labels: A Sad Sadness Song (2014); Gan-Shin (2018–present) nO aUTHORITY (2020–present)
- Awards: Best Metal and Hardcore Album (Korean Awards)
- Members: Kyuho; Juho; Somyul; Geon; LimuJohnPork
- Past members: (See full listing)
- Website: Homepage; Bandcamp

Madmans Esprit is a South Korean avant-garde metal band, highly inspired from visual kei. The band formed in 2010 in Seoul. Kyuho, the lead singer, defines his musical style as "Depressive Suicidal Blackened Pop". In 2023, their album I See Myself Through You Who See Us Through Me won the Korean Music Awards in the Best Metal and Hardcore album category.

== Career ==
Madmans Esprit was originally Lee Kyuho's solo project (이규호 in Korean), with him singing in Korean, Japanese, English, and German. At that time, he managed the composing, writing, recording, and mixing alone. He was, however, accompanied by various session musicians during his concerts and recordings. These musicians were originally Nansi (bass), Hojin (drums), and Jungbin (guitar). It was Jungbin who suggested the band's name. Thinking it sounded cool, Kyuho accepted.

In 2011, the band released their first EP, I Just Want to Sex With You. At that time, K-Pop dominated the musical scene in Korea, with black metal being a niche genre. Subsequently, the band struggled to gain recognition, and internationally they went unnoticed amidst the multitude of existing groups. At that time, the band wasn't doing visual kei yet, because such an aesthetic was difficult to adopt due to South Korean society being very conservative, so instead the band focused on traditional black/gothic metal.

In 2013, Kyuho moved to Berlin, Germany, in order to further develop his project on his own and reach a wider audience.

On October 6, 2014, he released on the Italian label A Sad Sadness Song his first album called Nacht, with a depressive black metal style. It was fairly well received internationally.

On October 15, 2018, he released his second album, 무의식의 의식화 [Conscientization of Unconsciousness], on the German label Gan-Shin, specializing in Japanese music. From then on, the band's music was much more influenced by progressive metal and visual kei. Starting this year, he recruited new musicians to accompany him live. Eun Chae on bass, Confyverse on drums, Somyul and Juho on guitar. The latter is his friend and the founder, singer, and guitarist of the rock and visual kei band “ms. isohp romatem,” active from 2018 to 2020, in which Kyuho also plays as a guitarist and background vocalist. Madmans Esprit gained international popularity and toured South Korea and Japan.

On May 4, 2019, they released the EP Glorifying Suicide. That year, the band performed for the first time in Europe on a tour of the same name. In September, the lineup changed again: Juho remained, but the others were replaced by Arc on guitar and Geon and Yoel from ms isohp romatem on bass and drums. On October 17, they released the single Seoul, which harshly criticizes South Korean society. They toured East Asia in November, playing in Taipei, Tokyo, Busan, and Seoul. That year, Madmans Esprit was described by AvoMagazine as a “major band” in the visual kei genre.

On February 19, 2020, they released the single 자해와 해방 (Jahaewa Haebang), followed on May 30, 2020 by 妄誕詩 (Mangtanshi). They were nominated for a Korean Music Award in the Best Metal and Hardcore Album category for their EP from the previous year.

On October 22, 2022, their third album, 나는 나를 통해 우리를 보는 너를 통해 나를 본다 (I See Myself Through You Who See Us Through Me), was released on the nO aUTHORITY label, which Kyuho described as the end of a chapter. In December, they toured Japan.

The year 2023 marked a crowning achievement when they won the Korean Music Awards in the Best Metal and Hardcore Album category. On October 30, the single Mismatch was released. During the year, disagreements arose and Arc and Yoel were dismissed, replaced by Somyul on guitar and Limu on drums.

They began 2024 with a single, 墜落, followed by seven concerts in Japan in February and April, with different bands opening each time. On August 19, Madmans Esprit became a real band in which the musicians were integrated as full members and no longer as mere accompanists. Since then, the five of them have been writing together, and the band's style has evolved under the influence of the other members. On the 30th, they released their latest EP, 5 Old Scars. A second European tour took place in October, with stops in Poland, the United Kingdom, France, Germany, Slovakia, and Italy.

On February 17, 2025, the single Please Stop Loving Me was released, the first to be jointly written by all members of the band. In April 2025, they toured Latin America, with stops in Mexico, Chile, and Brazil. In April, they performed to a sold-out crowd in Korea with metalcore and visual kei band Damned. In September, the band announced a third European tour, “Severed Hopes / Shattered Innocence,” which took place in January and February 2026. On the 30th of march the band has released Dandelion.

== Style and influences ==
The band members appear in their music videos and concerts with typical visual kei elements such as dark makeup and clothing, colored hair, as well as androgynous aesthetics. Their music videos are described as artistic and haunting. The themes explored in their songs primarily revolve around depression, suicide, sex, and philosophical themes such as existence and religion. A great deal of political and social commentary lies beneath the surface. Kyuho states:

"Madmans Esprit is a study of misery, looking deep into oneself, which eventually shows the reflections of society and furthermore, human nature. Why do we have to despair? Because we hope. Why do we have to die? Because we are born. Madmans Esprit is a question to all answers."

"To my eyes, the world is repulsive, humans are disgusting, so am I. Yet they are beautiful. That’s why it’s sad. That’s why I’m full of hatred of the others and myself."

The band's music is described by various sources as visual kei, black metal, gothic metal, doom metal, progressive metal, alternative metal, deathcore, blackgaze, post-rock, post-punk, or ambient, with pop, classical, and folk influences. This variety of descriptions reflects the diversity of their songs. They themselves call it "Depressive Suicidal Blackened Pop", an ironic reference to Depressive Suicidal Black Metal, and considering that pop—which they cite as an influence—has a greater impact. Kyuho cites the Japanese visual kei band Dir En Grey, as well as X Japan, Opeth, Shining, and Radiohead, as his main inspirations.

Kyuho's vocals are particularly distinctive in their music, ranging from operatic singing to growls and high-pitched screams.

== Members ==
Official members are in bold.

=== 2010 - August 18, 2024 ===
Time	Place	Lead vocals / multi-instrumental	Guitar		Bass	Drums
2010–2011	Seoul, South Korea	Kyuho	Jungbin		Nansi	Hojin
2011–2013	Seoul, South Korea	Kyuho	Jungbin			
2014–2017	Berlin, Germany	Kyuho				
2017–2018	Berlin, Germany	Kyuho	Mario Bauschert			
2018 – February 17, 2019	Seoul, South Korea	Kyuho	**Juho**	Somyul (Note: Former known as Senyt.)	Eun Chae	Confyverse
April 13, 2019 – April 28, 2019	European tour	Kyuho	**Juho**	Somyul	Tom Haberland	Confyverse
May 18, 2019 – August 2019	Seoul, South Korea	Kyuho	**Juho**	Somyul	Eun Chae	Confyverse
September 2019 – February 27, 2023	Seoul, South Korea	Kyuho	**Juho**	Arc	**Geon** (Note: Official member since August 19, 2024.)	Yoel
October 16, 2023 — February 10, 2024	Seoul, South Korea	Kyuho	**Juho**		**Geon**	**Limu**
February 11, 2024 — April 9, 2024	Japan tour	Kyuho	**Juho**	**Somyul**	**Geon**	**Limu**
Since April 19, 2024	Seoul, South Korea	Kyuho	**Juho**	**Somyul**	**Geon**	**Limu**

== Discography ==
Title	Year	Type
I Just Want to Sex with You	2011	EP
Madmans Esprit	2012	Demo
**Nacht**	2014	Studio album
**Conscientization of Unconsciousness** (Note: Hangul: 무의식의 의식화 / RR: Muuisigui uisikhwa)	2018	Studio album
Suicidol	2019	Single
Glorifying Suicide	2019	EP
Seoul	2019	Single
자해와 해방 (Jahaewa Haebang)	2020	Single
妄誕詩 (Mangtanshi)	2020	Single
백골의 정원 (Garden of Skeletons)	2021	Single
**I See Myself Through You Who See Us Through Me** (Note: Hangul: 나는 나를 통해 우리를 보는 너를 통해 나를 본다 / RR: Naneun nareul tonghae urireul boneun neoreul tonghae nareul bonda)	2022	Studio album
죽었으면 (I Hope I Die)	2023	Single
Bitter	2023	Single
Hass und Ignoranz	2023	Single
Mismatch	2023	Single
墜落 (Fall)	2024	Single
5 Old Scars	2024	EP
The World As Collective Reflections - WARSAW	2025	Live album
Please Stop Loving Me	2025	Single
**Dandelion**	2026	Studio album
