= Super Radical Gag Family =

Japanese manga series

- Cover of the first Japanese volume

浦安鉄筋家族 (Urayasu Tekkin Kazoku)
- Manga
- Written by: Kenji Hamaoka
- Published by: Akita Shoten
- English publisher: NA: Studio Ironcat
- Magazine: Weekly Shōnen Champion
- Original run: January 28, 1993 – February 21, 2002
- Volumes: 31
- Anime television series
- Directed by: Akitaro Daichi
- Written by: Kenji Hamaoka
- Music by: Harukichi Yamamoto
- Studio: Studio Deen
- Original network: Tokyo Broadcasting System
- Original run: June 30, 1998 – August 24, 1998
- Episodes: 33
- Manga

Original! Super Radical Gag Family
- Written by: Kenji Hamaoka
- Published by: Akita Shoten
- Magazine: Weekly Shōnen Champion
- Original run: March 21, 2002 – October 28, 2010
- Volumes: 28
- Manga

Always! Super Radical Gag Family
- Written by: Kenji Hamaoka
- Published by: Akita Shoten
- Magazine: Weekly Shōnen Champion
- Original run: November 4, 2010 – March 1, 2018
- Volumes: 24
- Manga

Awesome! Super Radical Gag Family
- Written by: Kenji Hamaoka
- Published by: Akita Shoten
- Magazine: Weekly Shōnen Champion
- Original run: March 15, 2018 – October 2, 2025
- Volumes: 24
- Manga

Extreme! Super Radical Gag Family
- Written by: Kenji Hamaoka
- Published by: Akita Shoten
- Magazine: Weekly Shōnen Champion
- Original run: November 13, 2025 – present
- Anime television series

Always! Super Radical Gag Family
- Directed by: Akitaro Daichi
- Music by: Harukichi Yamamoto
- Studio: Studio Deen
- Original network: Tokyo MX
- Original run: July 6, 2014 – December 21, 2014
- Episodes: 24
- Television drama
- Directed by: Tōichirō Rutō
- Produced by: Shinji Abe
- Written by: Makoto Ueda
- Original network: TV Tokyo
- Original run: April 10, 2020 – September 25, 2020
- Episodes: 12

Super Radical Gag Family (Japanese: 浦安鉄筋家族, Hepburn: Urayasu Tekkin Kazoku) is a Japanese manga series by Kenji Hamaoka. An anime adaptation by Studio Deen aired on TBS in 1998. A second anime adaptation was announced on 2014's 10th issue of Akita Shoten's Weekly Shōnen Champion on January 29, 2014. The second season was aired from July 6 to December 21, 2014. A live-action series adaptation of the series premiered on TV Tokyo on April 10, 2020. The series was on hiatus due to COVID-19 but it returned in June 2020.

== List of Episodes ==
=== Super Radical Gag Family (1998) ===
1. The Nose Hair (鼻毛な奴ら)
2. German (ドイツ人)
3. Take Some Nuts (あんとんナッツ)
4. Daitetsu Twilight (大鉄トゥワイライト)
5. Switching Schools (転校人)
6. The Sinking Meat (沈む肉)
7. Baruma (春巻)
8. The Juston Peanut (ジャストンぴーなつ)
9. Zoramu in Diapers (むつでゾーラム)
10. The Gingiva Girl (歯肉女)
11. Buri-chin (ぶりちん)
12. The Egg Competition (卵争)
13. Atsukiyu (あっきゅー)
14. Dan Horror (ダンボーラー)
15. New Ni-chan U-tan (新にーちゃんうーたん)
16. Homeless Miao (野良ミャオ)
17. Plum Star (梅星)
18. Fujimaru (ふじまる)
19. The Stupid Salad (馬鹿サラダ)
20. Domiso (どみそ)
21. The Bi-show (バイショー)
22. Homeless P38 (野良P38)
23. New Bombom the Moon (新ボンボンらむーん)
24. The Sea of Blood (血の海)
25. The Idiot (馬鹿者)
26. New Homeless Miao (新・野良ミャオ)
27. Shinma (しんま)
28. Binjiyoutaro (便乗太郎)
29. Yogore (よごれ)
30. New Hetsupiri (新へっぴり)
31. The Prime Boat's Song (舟盛りの歌)
32. Noriko's new friend

=== Always! Super Radical Gag Family (2014) ===
1. Adventure Family 〜Beyond Gyotoku City〜 (アドベンチャーファミリー 〜行徳を越えて〜)
2. Urayasu Meyers (浦安マイヤーズ)
3. Bitter! Squid Man (辛辣!イカ男)
4. Maruki Figure (マルキーフィギュア)
5. My Holiday (彼はお休み)
6. I'm Really Sorry (どーもすいません)
7. Sure You Want to Piggyback? (便乗してもいいですか?)
8. New Homeless Miao (真・野良ミャオ)
9. Sweet Claw (甘い爪)
10. Teru (てる)
11. Wonderful, Japanese! (素晴らしき哉、日本人!)
12. King Squid Story (大王イカ物語)
13. Ito Story 3 (イトーストーリー3)
14. Bose Detective (ボーズ探偵)
15. Osment (オスメント)
16. To The Distant Sky of Muta (遠い空のムタへ)
17. Poseidon (ポセイドン)
18. Hikaden (ヒカデン)
19. Throat Wheel (ノド輪)
20. Edible Briefs (食用ブリーフ)
21. Umbrella Story, Casa Pass (傘ネタ、カーサ渡し)
22. Toccata and Daitetsu (トッカータと大鉄)
23. My Neighbor is Noriko Nishikawa

西川 のり子

1. The tale of Harumaki Ryu

はるまき りゅう)no monogatari

== Opening Themes ==
=== Super Radical Gag Family (1998) ===
1. Summer's Illusion (ナツノマボロシ) (1–16) (Sheep)
2. -I'll- (17–33) (Dir En Grey)

=== Always! Super Radical Gag Family (2014) ===
1. The Town of Steel (鋼の街)
