= Agitated Screams of Maggots =

Single by Dir En Grey

from the album The Marrow of a Bone
- Released: November 15, 2006
- Recorded: Studio Innig, Sony Music Studios, Studio Fine (1); Nippon Budokan, July 31/August 1, 2006 (2, 3, 4)
- Genre: Melodic death metal
- Length: 14:45
- Label: Firewall Div./SMEJ (JP); Gan-Shin (EU); Warcon/Fontana (US)
- Songwriters: Die, Toshiya, Kaoru, Kyo, Shinya
- Producer: Dir En Grey

Dir En Grey singles chronology
"Ryōjoku no Ame" (2006)	"Agitated Screams of Maggots" (2006)	"Dozing Green" (2007)

"Agitated Screams of Maggots" is a single released by Dir En Grey on November 15, 2006, in Japan and later in Europe and the United States. The limited edition comes housed in a paper casing and includes a sticker. The title track is followed by three live songs recorded during the It Withers and Withers and Inward Scream tours at Nippon Budokan, Tokyo. The single was later featured on their sixth studio album, The Marrow of a Bone.

The version released in the United States, collaboratively between Warcon and Fontana, was exclusively sold through For Your Entertainment, and marketed as an EP. A live recording of "Agitated Screams of Maggots" is featured on the "Dozing Green" single. An unplugged version of "Agitated Screams of Maggots" is featured on the single "Glass Skin". This is the last release in which the artist's name is stylised as "Dir en grey".

== Track listing ==
All lyrics are written by Kyo; all music is composed by Dir En Grey.

No.	Title	Length
1.	"Agitated Screams of Maggots"	2:59
2.	"Kodoku ni Shisu, Yueni Kodoku. [Live]" (孤独に死す、故に孤独。[Live])	3:52
3.	"Spilled Milk [Live]"	3:57
4.	"Obscure [Live]"	3:55

== Personnel ==
- Yasushi "Koni-Young" Konishi – recording, mixing
- Yasman – mastering
- Dynamite Tommy – executive producer
- Keita Kurosaka – cover art
- Yuuichi Fukada – art direction
- Kazuya Nakajima, Yasuyuki Kanoi – live recording

== Release history ==
Region	Date
Japan	November 15, 2006
Europe	December 1, 2006
United States	January 9, 2007

== Music video ==
The music video for the song is entirely animated, with only a short animated portrayal of the band members. It is created by Keita Kurosaka and done in his characteristically full traditional animation with ero guro-inspired motifs. It has been shown as a film at festivals such as the 2007 International Film Festival Rotterdam for its "animation based on their music exemplifying his fascination for violence and relationships".
