= Yurameki =

Single by Dir En Grey

from the album Gauze
- B-side: "Akuro no Oka “K.N.Y. Mix”"
- Released: January 20, 1999
- Recorded: One on One Recording North (Los Angeles)
- Genre: Alternative rock, pop rock
- Length: 11:00
- Label: East West (AMDM-6290)
- Composer: Shinya
- Lyricist: Kyo
- Producer: Yoshiki

Dir En Grey singles chronology
"Akuro no Oka" (1999)	"Yurameki" (1999)	"Zan" (1999)

"Yurameki" (ゆらめき, "Waver") is a single released by Dir En Grey on January 20, 1999, simultaneously along with "Akuro no Oka" and "Zan". The single peaked at number 5 on the Oricon music charts in Japan.

The song was covered by R-Shitei on the compilation Crush! 2 -90's V-Rock Best Hit Cover Songs-, which was released on November 23, 2011 and features current visual kei bands covering songs from bands that were important to the 1990s visual kei movement. For their 25th anniversary, Dir En Grey re-recorded "Yurameki" for the 2024 single "19990120".

== Track listing ==
All lyrics are written by Kyo.

No.	Title	Music	Length
1.	"Yurameki" (ゆらめき; "Waver")	Shinya	5:09
2.	"Akuro no Oka “K.N.Y. Mix”" (アクロの丘 “K.N.Y. Mix”; "Hill of the Acropolis “K.N.Y. Mix”", remix by Gary Adante, Rob Arbittier, Eddie DeLena)	Kaoru	5:51

== Personnel ==
- Dir En Grey
  - Kyo – vocals, lyricist
  - Kaoru – guitar
  - Die – guitar
  - Toshiya – bass guitar
  - Shinya – drums
- Yoshiki – producer
- Joe Chiccarelli – audio mixing
- Steven Marcussen (Precision Mastering) – mastering
- Gary Adante, Rob Arbittier and Eddie DeLena (Noisy Neighbors Productions) – remixing
