= Akuro no Oka =

Single by Dir En Grey

from the album Gauze
- B-side: "Zan “D.P.Y. Mix”"
- Released: January 20, 1999
- Recorded: One on One Recording North (Los Angeles)
- Length: 12:40
- Label: East West
- Songwriter(s): Kyo, Kaoru
- Producer(s): Yoshiki

Dir En Grey singles chronology
"-I'll-" (1998)	"Akuro no Oka" (1999)	"Yurameki" (1999)

"Akuro no Oka" (アクロの丘, "Hill of the Acropolis") is a single released by Dir En Grey on January 20, 1999. It is among the first to feature remixes and was released simultaneously along with "Yurameki" and "Zan". The single peaked at number 7 on the Oricon music charts in Japan. For their 25th anniversary, Dir En Grey re-recorded "Akuro no Oka" for the 2024 single "19990120".

== Track listing ==
All lyrics are written by Kyo; all music is composed by Kaoru.

No.	Title	Length
1.	"Akuro no Oka" (アクロの丘; "Hill of the Acropolis")	8:33
2.	"Zan “D.P.Y. Mix”" (残-ZAN- “D.P.Y. Mix”; Remains “D.P.Y. Mix”, remix by Paul DeCarli)	4:07

== Personnel ==
- Dir En Grey
  - Kyo – vocals, lyricist
  - Kaoru – guitar, composer
  - Die – guitar
  - Toshiya – bass guitar
  - Shinya – drums, composer
- Yoshiki – producer
- Bill Kennedy (Precision Mastering) – mastering
- Paul DeCarli – remixing
