= Gan-Shin =

Gan-Shin (Rock Spirit)
- Founded: 2004
- Founder: Matthias Müssig, Christoph Ortner-Bach, Deville Schober
- Status: Active
- Distributor(s): Rough Trade Distribution (DE/AT); Season of Mist (FR); Plastic Head (UK); Sound Pollution (SE/DK); Audioglobe (IT/ES/PT); ZYX Music (BE/NL/LU); Supersounds(FI)
- Genre: Rock
- Country of origin: Germany
- Official website: Official Page

Gan-Shin (岩神, Rock Spirit) is an independent European rock music record label.

== History ==
It was formed in 2004 by Matthias Müssig, Christoph Ortner-Bach and Deville Schober. The label, actively distributes physical records in Germany, France, the United Kingdom, Italy, Spain and Scandinavia. Digitally they're mostly active in Europe but also distribute some band's like Matenrou Opera, angela and TeddyLoid almost worldwide. Gan-Shin Records exclusively signs bands from Japan, though has recently signed Madmans Esprit, a German-Korean based band. The label currently distributes the music of over 60 bands and artists throughout Europe.

== Bands overview ==
- 12012
- abingdon boys school
- An Cafe
- angela
- D
- D'espairsRay
- Dir En Grey (transferred in 2009 to sister label Okami Records from the main label)
- Domoto Tsuyoshi
- DuelJewel
- Gackt
- Girugamesh
- heidi.
- Hyde
- Ic5
- Kagerou
- L'Arc-en-Ciel
- LM.C
- Madmans Esprit
- Megamasso
- Merry
- Mix Speaker's,Inc.
- Mucc
- Nightmare
- Nogod
- Rentrer en Soi
- The Studs
- Vidoll
- XodiacK
- Zoro

== See also ==
- List of record labels
