= Oni-Con =

Anime convention in the United States

Coordinates: 29°44′2″N 95°33′1″W

- Status: Active
- Venue: Houston Marriott Westchase
- Location: Houston, Texas
- Country: United States
- Inaugurated: 2004
- Attendance: 7,000 (est) in 2011
- Website: http://www.oni-con.net/

Oni-Con is an annual three-day anime convention held during October at the Houston Marriott Westchase in Houston, Texas. The name of the convention comes from, "oni", the Japanese word for "demon/ogre".

== Features ==
The convention typically offers anime rooms, art show and auction, concerts, contests, a dance, a dealer's room, demonstrations, industry guests, LARP, masquerade, panels, video games, and voice actors.

== History ==
The convention was started by members of an Mallets, Etc., a Houston-based Anime Club. Oni-Con 2004 was held at the Sheraton North Houston at George Bush Intercontinental. The convention in its first year had an expected attendance of 1,200, but ended up with more than 3,000 attending. Oni-Con 2005 was held at the Park Plaza, Reliant Center. In 2006, Oni-Con had a dispute with the Grand Plaza Hotel in Houston. Oni-Cons 2006, 2007 and 2008 were held at the George R. Brown Convention Center. Oni-Con 2009 and 2010 was held at the Houston Marriott Westchase. For 2011, Oni-Con moved to Galveston, Texas and was held at the Galveston Island Convention Center. Oni-Con 2020 was cancelled due to the COVID-19 pandemic. The convention started a fundraiser in July 2020 for voice actor Chris Ayres, who was suffering from serious health issues.

=== Event history ===
Dates	Location	Attendance	Guests
October 22–24, 2004	Sheraton North Houston at George Bush Intercontinental; Houston, Texas	3,000	Greg Ayres, Jason Balduf, Byron Beaubien, Camino, Rodney "Largo" Caston, Mandy Clark, Clover, Michael Coleman, DuelJewel, Tiffany Grant, Yaya Han, Kyle Hebert, Taliesin Jaffe, Lord Katsuhiko Jinnai, Bruce Lewis, George Manley, Scott McNeil, Vic Mignogna, Chris Patton, Xero Reynolds, Monica Rial, Jan Scott-Frazier, Doug Smith, and Shawn the Touched.
October 21–23, 2005	Park Plaza, Reliant Center; Houston, Texas	4,000	Christopher Ayres, Greg Ayres, Tom Bateman, Clover, Consplayers.com, Emily DeJesus, echostream, Kyle Hebert, Taliesin Jaffe, Li Kovacs, Bruce Lewis, Limit Break Cosplay, Mike McFarland, Jamie McGonnigal, Matthew Mercer, Vic Mignogna, Jace Moore, Chris Moujaes, Phantasmagoria, Xero Reynolds, Monica Rial, Aaron Romo, Rooster Teeth Productions, Jan Scott-Frazier, Doug Smith, Kira Vincent-Davis, and Dan Woren.
October 20–22, 2006	George R. Brown Convention Center; Houston, Texas	6,000	12012, Alistair Abell, Yoshitaka Amano, Christopher Ayres, Greg Ayres, Chris Bevins, Charles Campbell, Luci Christian, Tiffany Grant, Matt Greenfield, Clarine Harp, Taliesin Jaffe, Kyle Jones, Brittney Karbowski, Bruce Lewis, Limit Break Cosplay, Sarah Lindholm, Jamie McGonnigal, Matthew Mercer, Jace Moore, Chris Moujaes, Chris Patton, Xero Reynolds, Monica Rial, Aaron Romo, Don Rush, Sailor JAMboree, Carrie Savage, Jan Scott-Frazier, Blake Shepard, Doug Smith, Space Invader, John Swasey, Michael "Mookie" Terracciano, and David L. Williams.
October 19–21, 2007	George R. Brown Convention Center; Houston, Texas	4,030	Tomo Asaha, Christopher Ayres, Greg Ayres, Chris Bevins, Clint Bickham, Michael Coleman, Kaylyn Dicksion, Aaron Dismuke, Tiffany Grant, Jessie James Grelle, Clarine Harp, Kyle Hebert, Samantha Inoue-Harte, Taliesin Jaffe, Trish Ledoux, Bruce Lewis, Mike McFarland, Scott McNeil, Vic Mignogna, Chris Moujaes, Chris Patton, Wendy Powell, Steve Prince, Rentrer en Soi, Xero Reynolds, Aaron Romo, Carrie Savage, Jan Scott-Frazier, Doug Smith, Michael "Mookie" Terracciano, Shinichi Watanabe, Travis Willingham, and Toshifumi Yoshida.
December 19–21, 2008	George R. Brown Convention Center; Houston, Texas		Greg Ayres, Chris Bevins, echostream, Tiffany Grant, Clarine Harp, Samantha Inoue-Harte, Bruce Lewis, Jamie Marchi, Mike McFarland, Vic Mignogna, Chris Patton, Xero Reynolds, and Jan Scott-Frazier.
October 30 – November 1, 2009	Houston Marriott Westchase; Houston, Texas	6,000	Chris Bevins, Born, Buranden, echostream, Tiffany Grant, Matt Greenfield, Clarine Harp, Jerry Jewell, Bruce Lewis, Wendy Powell, Xero Reynolds, Satsuki, Carrie Savage, Blake Shepard, Alissa Simmons, Michael "Mookie" Terracciano, and Twinzik.
October 29–31, 2010	Houston Marriott Westchase; Houston, Texas		Airship Isabella, Almost Angels, Christopher Ayres, Greg Ayres, Chris Cason, Samurai Dan Coglan, Gakido, Jessie James Grelle, Samantha Inoue-Harte, Jerry Jewell, Lemon Drop Kick, Carli Mosier, Wendy Powell, Carrie Savage, Ciarán Strange, J. Michael Tatum, Michael "Mookie" Terracciano, and David Vincent.
October 28–30, 2011	Galveston Island Convention Center; Galveston, Texas	7,000 (est)	Airship Isabella, Almost Angels, Christopher Ayres, Greg Ayres, Chris Bevins, Erin "Eri" Brady, The Celestial Rogues, Jillian Coglan, Samurai Dan Coglan, The Earthbound Papas, Clarine Harp, Taliesin Jaffe, DJ Jimni Cricket, Lemon Drop Kick, Stanley G. Love, Carli Mosier, Otokage, Rikki Simons, J. Michael Tatum, Nobuo Uematsu, and Tavisha Wolfgarth-Simons.
October 19–21, 2012	Galveston Island Convention Center; Galveston, Texas		Christopher Ayres, Greg Ayres, Chris Bevins, Jillian Coglan, Samurai Dan Coglan, The Earthbound Papas, Kara Edwards, Clarine Harp, Taliesin Jaffe, Jerry Jewell, Carli Mosier, Jessie Pridemore, Carrie Savage, Rikki Simons, Michael Sinterniklaas, Soup or Villainz, Tavisha Wolfgarth-Simons, and YTCracker.
October 25–27, 2013	Galveston Island Convention Center; Galveston, Texas		Alsdead, Dr. Awkward, Christopher Ayres, Greg Ayres, Jillian Coglan, Samurai Dan Coglan, The Earthbound Papas, Foayasha, Clarine Harp, Taliesin Jaffe, Carli Mosier, Whitney Ray, Saber Tiger, SEC-C Cosplay, Nobuo Uematsu, and YTCracker.
October 31 – November 2, 2014	Galveston Island Convention Center; Galveston, Texas		Christopher Ayres, Greg Ayres, Chris Bevins, Ganglion, Masashi Hamauzu, Clarine Harp, Atelier Heidi, Imeruat, Taliesin Jaffe, April Martin, Carl Martin, Carli Mosier, Benyamin Nuss, Rachel Robinson, and Junko Takeuchi.
October 30 – November 1, 2015	Galveston Island Convention Center at The San Luis Resort; Galveston, Texas		Christopher Ayres, Greg Ayres, Chris Bevins, Cynthia Cranz, Clarine Harp, Atelier Heidi, Taliesin Jaffe, Jerry Jewell, April Martin, Carl Martin, Xander Mobus, Carli Mosier, Project BECK, and Rachel Robinson.
October 28–30, 2016	Galveston Island Convention Center at The San Luis Resort; Galveston, Texas		Christopher Ayres, Greg Ayres, Chris Bevins, Critical Hit, The Earthbound Papas, Clarine Harp, Taliesin Jaffe, Xander Mobus, Carli Mosier, Lisa Ortiz, Rachel Robinson, Rikki Simons, and Tavisha Wolfgarth-Simons.
October 28–30, 2017	Galveston Island Convention Center at The San Luis Resort; Galveston, Texas		Aya "Dancing Fighter", Greg Ayres, Jillian Coglan, Samurai Dan Coglan, Matthew Erickson, Clarine Harp, Kristen McGuire, Carli Mosier, Lisa Ortiz, Meredith Placko, Rachel Robinson, Hitoshi Sakimoto, Kimura U, and YTCracker.
November 9–11, 2018	Galveston Island Convention Center at The San Luis Resort; Galveston, Texas		Akira, Ani-Mia, Greg Ayres, Chris Bevins, Jessica Calvello, Samurai Dan Coglan, Disacode, Clarine Harp, Brittney Karbowski, Briana Lawrence, Lewis Lovhaug, Carli Mosier, Lisa Ortiz, Rachel Robinson, Rikki Simons, and Tavisha Wolfgarth-Simons.
November 8–10, 2019	Galveston Island Convention Center at The San Luis Resort; Galveston, Texas		Chris Bevins, Clarine Harp, Billy Kametz, Christina Marie Kelly, Lewis Lovhaug, Carli Mosier, Rachel Robinson, Scarfing Scarves, and Kazuki Yao.
October 30–31, 2021	Galveston Island Convention Center at The San Luis Resort; Galveston, Texas		Chris Bevins, Jillian Coglan, Samurai Dan Coglan, Clarine Harp, Kazha, Carli Mosier, Rachel Robinson, and Michael Sinterniklaas.
November 11–13, 2022	Galveston Island Convention Center at The San Luis Resort; Galveston, Texas		Greg Ayres, Jillian Coglan, Samurai Dan Coglan, Clarine Harp, Kazha, Lewis Lovhaug, Carli Mosier, Rob Mungle, Mikio Sakai, Michael Sinterniklaas, Sparrowhawk Cosplay, and Viga.
November 10–12, 2023	Galveston Island Convention Center at The San Luis Resort; Galveston, Texas		Chris Bevins, Jillian Coglan, Samurai Dan Coglan, The Geeky Seamstress, John Gremillion, Clarine Harp, Kazha, Lewis Lovhaug, Carli Mosier, Rob Mungle, Rachel Robinson, Michael Sinterniklaas, and Viga.
October 11–13, 2024	Galveston Island Convention Center at The San Luis Resort; Galveston, Texas		Greg Ayres, Chris Bevins, John Gremillion, Clarine Harp, Kazha, Lewis Lovhaug, Rachel Robinson, Oscar Seung, Michael Sinterniklaas, John Swasey, Viga, Gareth West, and YTCracker.
October 10–12, 2025	Galveston Island Convention Center at The San Luis Resort; Galveston, Texas		Chris Bevins, Caitlynn French, Clarine Harp, Kazha, Lewis Lovhaug, Kris "Phade" McCormic, Rachel Robinson, Oscar Seung, Michael Sinterniklaas, Viga, and Gareth West.
October 1–3, 2027	Houston Marriott Westchase; Houston, Texas		

== Oni-Con Hawaii ==
Oni-Con Hawaii was a three-day anime convention held during November at the Hawaii Convention Center in Honolulu, Hawaii. It was created by Oni-Con and Babel Entertainment, growing out of the defunct Hawaii Entertainment Expo (HEXXP). The convention featured a combined artist alley/dealers room (marketplace), host club and maid cafe, tabletop gaming, and video games. Communication issues affected the convention including cancelled panels and running out of lanyards. The convention chair of Oni-Con Hawaii 2014 stated that they did not receive the necessary resources from Oni-Con. He also knew nothing of the conventions 2014 plans.

=== Event history ===
Dates	Location	Atten.	Guests
November 1–3, 2013	Hawaii Convention Center; Honolulu, Hawaii		The Earthbound Papas, Atelier Pierrot, Hiroki Takahashi, J. Michael Tatum, and Nobuo Uematsu.
