= AnimeNEXT =

Anime convention in Edison, New Jersey

Coordinates: 40.50147°N 74.34756°W

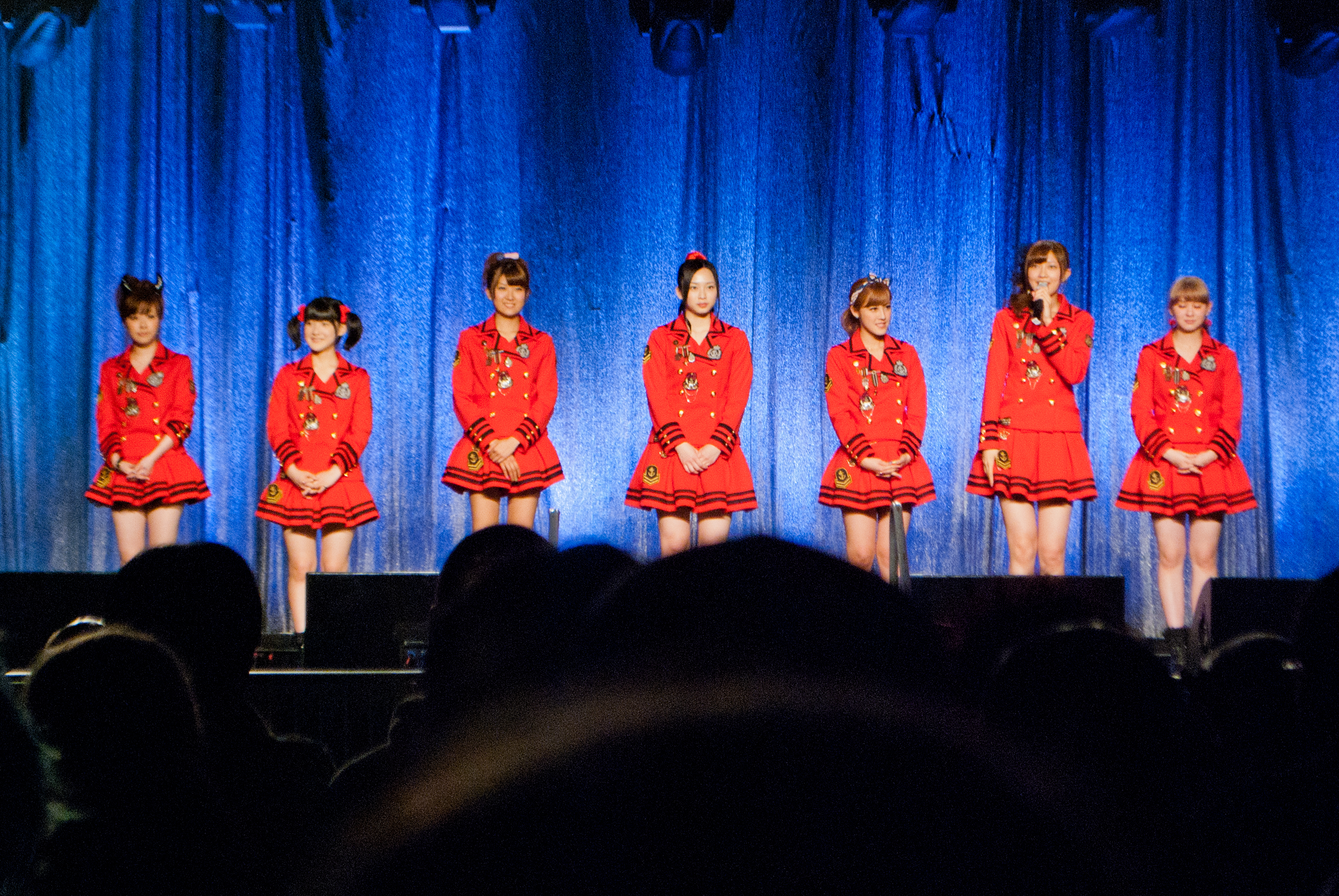
- Berryz Kobo at AnimeNEXT 2012
- Status: Indefinite hiatus
- Genre: Anime, Manga, Japanese culture
- Venue: New Jersey Convention and Exposition Center; Hyatt Regency New Brunswick
- Location: Edison, New Jersey
- Country: United States
- Inaugurated: 2002
- Attendance: 11,026 in 2018
- Organizer: Universal Animation, Inc.
- Website: http://www.animenext.org/

AnimeNEXT (AN) is an annual three-day anime convention held at the New Jersey Convention and Exposition Center and Hyatt Regency New Brunswick in Edison, New Jersey. The convention was previously held at the Meadowlands Exposition Center in Secaucus, New Jersey, the Garden State Exhibit Center in Somerset, New Jersey, and the Atlantic City Convention Center in Atlantic City, New Jersey.

== Programming ==
The convention typically offers anime music video (AMV) screenings, cosplay chess, a dance, dealer's room, karaoke, panels, masquerade, video gaming, and video rooms.

== History ==
The first convention in 2002 was put on with limited staffing and was planned in eight months. In 2008 parts of the convention were held in the parking garage below the Meadowlands Exposition Center. The convention then moved to the Garden State Exhibit Center, although it experienced crowding issues in 2012 with outdoor space used for lines. AnimeNEXT moved to the Atlantic City Convention Center in Atlantic City, New Jersey for 2016, with the deal lasting until 2020. The convention moved due to outgrowing the Garden State Exhibit Center. In 2016, the United States finals of the World Cosplay Summit were held at AnimeNEXT. Major communication and scheduling issues with panels occurred before and during the 2017 convention. Accusations of past staff member harassment were published in 2019, with former con chair Eric Torgersen being suspended in April.

AnimeNEXT 2020 was cancelled due to the COVID-19 pandemic. The convention was changed to an online only event for 2021, due to the Atlantic City Convention Center being used as a large scale COVID-19 vaccination center. AnimeNEXT 2022 was cancelled due to problems with the Atlantic City Convention Center. Issues included significant price increases for the venue, lack of COVID-19 policies, and no communication about another event in the area during the same weekend, the Orange Loop Rock Festival.

AnimeNEXT would move to the New Jersey Convention and Exposition Center in Edison, NJ in 2023. The organizers would shift the COVID-19 policy from "masks required" to "masks encouraged" just two weeks prior to the 2023 event. In February 2024, AnimeNEXT management made a post across their social media accounts stating that "Universal Animation, Inc., the parent company of AnimeNEXT, recently faced circumstances that brought planning for our 2024 convention to a screeching halt." The post went on to confirm that the convention would not be held that year, stating that "As a result, we will not be holding AnimeNEXT 2024." In January 2025, AnimeNEXT management announced that the convention was on "indefinite hiatus", stating that "Universal Animation, Inc., the parent company of AnimeNEXT, is going through organizational restructuring and addressing many legacy issues."

=== Event history ===
Dates	Location	Attendance	Guests
October 11–13, 2002	Crowne Plaza Meadowlands; Secaucus, New Jersey	1,071	Kia Asamiya, Robert Bricken, C.B. Cebulski, Richard Ian Cox, Robert DeJesus, Mike Hayes, Jamie McGonnigal, Kristen Nelson, Frank Pannone, Steve Pearl, Bill Rogers, Michael Sinterniklaas, Myriam Sirois, and Toshifumi Yoshida.
October 3–5, 2003	Rye Town Hilton; Rye Brook, New York	1,571	B! Machine, Steve Bennett, Chris Beveridge, Robert Bricken, C.B. Cebulski, Clark Cheng, Tiffany Grant, Wayne Grayson, Jon Guttierez, Daniel Kevin Harrison, Himawari, Takehiko Ito, Trish Ledoux, Rob Malda, Jamie McGonnigal, MegaZone, Kristen Nelson, Frank Pannone, Peelander-Z, Mike Pollock, Georgette Reilly, Bill Rogers, Jan Scott-Frazier, Trisha Lynn Sebastian, Michael Sinterniklaas, John Sirabella, Moneca Stori, James Arnold Taylor, Marc Thompson, Bill Timoney, Tom Wayland, David L. Williams, Barry Winston, and Toshifumi Yoshida.
June 18–20, 2004	Crowne Plaza Meadowlands; Secaucus, New Jersey	3,400	Alissyn Brock, Kelli Shayne Butler, C.B. Cebulski, Cosmicity, Richard Ian Cox, Edwin De La Cruz, Lauren Goodnight, Trish Ledoux, Rob Malda, Kenneth Robert Marlo, Matt K. Miller, Mari Morimoto, Merideth Mulroney, Lisa Ortiz, Stephen Pakula, Peelander-Z, Mike Pollock, Bill Rogers, Michael Sinterniklaas, The Spunks, Moneca Stori, Veronica Taylor, Marc Thompson, Matt Thorn, Tom Wayland, David L. Williams, Barry Winston, and Toshifumi Yoshida.
June 17–19, 2005	Meadowlands Exposition Center; Holiday Inn Meadowlands; Secaucus, New Jersey	4,200	Alissyn Brock, Akitaroh Daichi, Mark Diraison, Caitlin Glass, Lauren Goodnight, Wayne Grayson, Lance Heiskell, Mayumi Kobayashi, Trish Ledoux, Vic Mignogna, Sean Molyneaux, Merideth Mulroney, Ed Paul, Peelander-Z, Mike Pollock, Justin Sevakis, Uzuhi, Tom Wayland, David L. Williams, Kerry Williams, Travis Willingham, Reiko Yasuhara, and Toshifumi Yoshida.
June 16–18, 2006	Meadowlands Exposition Center; Holiday Inn Meadowlands; Secaucus, New Jersey	6,000	Laura Bailey, Colleen Clinkenbeard, D'espairsRay, Caitlin Glass, Lauren Goodnight, Wayne Grayson, Trish Ledoux, Masao Maruyama, Vic Mignogna, Mari Morimoto, Mike Pollock, Rintaro, Bill Rogers, Harold Sakuishi, Michael Sinterniklaas, Marc Thompson, Kari Wahlgren, David L. Williams, and Toshifumi Yoshida.
July 6–8, 2007	Meadowlands Exposition Center; Holiday Inn Meadowlands; Secaucus, New Jersey	7,100	12012, Eric Calderon, Daisuke Gomi, Wayne Grayson, Toyo Ikeda, Jonathan Klein, Michele Knotz, Mari Morimoto, Kensuke Okabayashi, Frank Pannone, Chris Patton, Ed Paul, Mike Pollock, Monica Rial, Bill Rogers, Michael Sinterniklaas, Gustavo Sorola, Tom Wayland, and Kathleen Zuelch.
June 20–22, 2008	Meadowlands Exposition Center; Holiday Inn Meadowlands; Secaucus, New Jersey	7,900	Greg Ayres, Steve Bennett, Leah Clark, Joe Digiorgi, Aidan Drummond, Brian Drummond, James Harknell, Michele Knotz, Chris "Kilika" Malone, Rich McNanna, Dallas Middaugh, Mari Morimoto, Kensuke Okabayashi, Rentrer en Soi, Bill Rogers, Brad Swaile, Michael "Mookie" Terracciano, Alison Viktorin, and Tom Wayland.
June 12–14, 2009	Garden State Exhibit Center; Somerset DoubleTree Hotel; Somerset, New Jersey		Shihan Carbonaro, Fake?, Wayne Grayson, Kyle Hebert, Michele Knotz, Dave Lister, Chris "Kilika" Malone, Misako Rocks!, Mike Pollock, Stacie Renna, Bill Rogers, Michael "Mookie" Terracciano, Bill Timoney, Tom Wayland, and Toshifumi Yoshida.
June 18–20, 2010	Garden State Exhibit Center; Somerset, New Jersey		Greg Ayres, Bea Billany, Eirik Blackwolf, Gashicon, Kyle Hebert, Kenji Kamiyama, Anthony Kresky, Dave Lister, Chris "Kilika" Malone, Kevin McKeever, Tony Oliver, Stacie Renna, Sleeping Samurai, Stereopony, and Uncle Yo
June 10–12, 2011	Garden State Exhibit Center; Somerset, New Jersey		Robert Axelrod, Greg Ayres, Chipocrite, Leah Clark, Joe Foering, Onezumi Hartstein, Kanon, Yu Kimura, Michele Knotz, Dave Lister, Scott A. Melzer, Vic Mignogna, Mix Speaker's,Inc., Satoru Nakamura, Trina Nishimura, Promise Sisters, Matt Pyson, Bill Rogers, Takamasa Sakurai, Sixh, Uzuhi, Mike Wall, Tom Wayland, Steve Yun, and Tommy Yune.
June 8–10, 2012	Garden State Exhibit Center; Somerset, New Jersey	9,850	Berryz Kobo, Kevin Bolk, C.R.A.Z.Y.O.T.A.K.U., Chipocrite, Leah Clark, Kara Edwards, Bill Ellis, Toshihiro Fukuoka, Kyle Hebert, Michele Knotz, Dave Lister, Kevin McKeever, Dani O'Brien, Satsuki, and Z8 (Z-Ann).
June 7–9, 2013	Garden State Exhibit Center; Somerset, New Jersey	10,283	The Asterplace, Greg Ayres, C.R.A.Z.Y.O.T.A.K.U., Chris Cason, Chipocrite, Greg Houser, Akinori Isobe, Masumi Kano, Michele Knotz, Kevin McKeever, Mint, Moon Stream, Mike Pollock, Bill Rogers, Hiroshi Shimizu, Saki Tachibana, Mike Toole, Uncle Yo, Hiro Usuda, Sayo Yamamoto, Steve Yun, and Tommy Yune.
June 6–8, 2014	Garden State Exhibit Center; Somerset, New Jersey	11,940	C.R.A.Z.Y.O.T.A.K.U., Chipocrite, Richard Epcar, Jessie James Grelle, Luna Haruna, Greg Houser, Kimura U, Jonathan Klein, Michele Knotz, Shigeto Koyama, Matthew Mercer, Gerald Rathkolb, Bill Rogers, ROOKiEZ is PUNK'D, Ellyn Stern, Daryl Surat, Alexis Tipton, Hiromi Wakabayashi, and Lex Winter.
June 12–14, 2015	Garden State Exhibit Center; Somerset, New Jersey	14,500	Kira Buckland, C.R.A.Z.Y.O.T.A.K.U., Chipocrite, Elisa, Flow, Todd Haberkorn, Naoto Hirooka, Takafumi Hori, Greg Houser, Michele Knotz, Shigeto Koyama, Matthew Lassiter, Brittany Lauda, Neil Nadelman, Tyson Rinehart, Jason Robinson, Bill Rogers, Sushio, Aya Suzuki, Marc Swint, Mike Toole, Uncle Yo, Vedetta Marie, Hiromi Wakabayashi, and Lex Winter.
June 10–12, 2016	Atlantic City Convention Center; Atlantic City, New Jersey	12,374	Akira Amemiya, C.R.A.Z.Y.O.T.A.K.U., Akitaroh Daichi, Richard Epcar, Clarissa Graffeo, Todd Haberkorn, Rei Hiroe, Jonathan Klein, Megumi Kouno, Shigeto Koyama, Matthew Lassiter, Naoko Matsui, Helen McCarthy, Erica Mendez, Mint, Gerald Rathkolb, Bill Rogers, ROOKiEZ is PUNK'D, Ellyn Stern, Daryl Surat, Marc Swint, Mike Toole, Uncle Yo, Vedetta Marie, Hiromi Wakabayashi, Lex Winter, and Zaq.
June 9–11, 2017	Atlantic City Convention Center; Atlantic City, New Jersey	12,733	Capcom Live!, Cosplay Pro-Wrestling, Zack Davisson, Richard Epcar, Sandy Fox, Toshihiro Fukuoka, Shuhei Handa, Noriko Hidaka, Izumi Hirose, Noriko Ito, Itto-Maru, Tomochi Kosaka, Shigeto Koyama, Lex Lang, Erica Lindbeck, Nao, Oblivion Dust, Takahiro Ogawa, Katriel Paige, Ellyn Stern, John Swasey, Junpei Tatenaka, Mike Toole, Reina Ueda, Uncle Yo, Viga, Hiromi Wakabayashi, Lex Winter, Junko Yamanaka, and Yoh Yoshinari.
June 8–10, 2018	Atlantic City Convention Center; Atlantic City, New Jersey	11,026	All Off, Shinji Aramaki, Katelyn Barr, Johnny Yong Bosch, Caitlynn French, Kenji Kamiyama, Marina Kawano, Kyle McCarley, Dave Merrill, Mint, Bryce Papenbrook, Juliet Simmons, Bill Timoney, and U.
June 7–9, 2019	Atlantic City Convention Center; Atlantic City, New Jersey		Aimi, Erika Ando, Cellchrome, Richard Epcar, Sandy Fox, Toshihiro Fukuoka, Jessie James Grelle, Kohei Hattori, Akemi Hayashi, Itto-Maru, Hirokatsu Kihara, Lex Lang, LeChat, Max Mittelman, Shihori Nakane, Ellyn Stern, Andrew Upton, Hiroko Utsumi, and Ayumi Yamada.
June 11–13, 2021	Online convention		
June 16–18, 2023	New Jersey Convention and Exposition Center; Hyatt Regency New Brunswick; Edison, New Jersey		Bennett Abara, Jon Allen, Morgan Berry, Beau Billingslea, Blue Encount, Charles Campbell, Bob Carter, Paul Castro Jr., Sandy Fox, Ray Hurd, Jeremy Inman, Lex Lang, Kristen McGuire, Phil Parsons, and Tara Sands.

== Manga library ==
AnimeNEXT has taken their Manga library to other conventions, including Otakon and New York Comic Con.

== See also ==
- MangaNEXT
