= Ain Soph Aur (album) =

Compilation album by Rentrer en Soi
- Released: November 19, 2008
- Recorded: 2001–2008
- Genres: Alternative metal; metalcore; hard rock; alternative rock
- Length: Disc 1: 72:19 / Disc 2: 67:09
- Labels: Free-Will (JP); Gan-Shin (EU)
- Producer: Rentrer en Soi

Rentrer en Soi chronology
Megiddo (2008)	Ain Soph Aur (2008)

Singles from Ain Soph Aur
- 1. "Ichigo Oblate" Released: March 16, 2003; 2. "Hamon Tsutau Memai" Released: May 1, 2003; 3. "Mizu Yume Miru Chouchou" Released: May 25, 2005; 4. "Stigmata" Released: March 26, 2008

Ain Soph Aur is a compilation album by the Japanese rock band Rentrer en Soi. It was released on November 19, 2008, shortly before they disbanded.

== Track listing ==
=== Disc 1 ===
All lyrics are written by Satsuki.

Disc one: Side of Michael
No.	Title	Length
1.	"Stigmata" (From the single Stigmata.)	5:03
2.	"Sincerely" (From the EP Yurikago.)	4:08
3.	"Kuuhaku no Joukei (空白の情景)" (Original.)	4:14
4.	"Hamon Tsutau Memai (波紋伝う眩暈)" (From the single Sakura Mai -Yume no Naka Mezamereba.)	4:37
5.	"Last Scene" (From the EP Megiddo.)	5:10
6.	"Shinwa (神話)" (From the album The Bottom of Chaos.)	5:22
7.	"Full Moon" (From the album Sphire Croid.)	3:58
8.	"Monochrome Cinema (モノクロームシネマ)" (From the EP Yurikago.)	3:38
9.	"Eyes of Forest" (From the album Sphire Croid.)	4:17
10.	"Tsuki de Namida (月で涙)" (From the EP Astre no Ito.)	3:47
11.	"Into the Sky" (Original.)	4:02
12.	"To Infinity" (From the album The Bottom of Chaos.)	3:58
13.	"Mizu Yume Miru Chouchou (水夢見る蝶々)" (From the single Mizu Yume Miru Chouchou.)	3:36
14.	"Secret Scars -Beside You-" (From the album Sphire Croid.)	4:26
15.	"Hoshikuzu no Rasen (星屑の螺旋)" (From the EP Astre no Ito.)	4:22
16.	"Stay Gold" (Original.)	7:29

=== Disc 2 ===
All lyrics are written by Satsuki.

Disc two: Side of Satan
No.	Title	Length
1.	"Protoplasm" (From the album Rentrer en Soi.)	5:39
2.	"Just Mad Pain" (From the album The Bottom of Chaos.)	4:16
3.	"Usubeniiro (薄紅色)" (From the album Sphire Croid.)	3:46
4.	"Re-birth" (From the EP Yurikago.)	3:17
5.	"Bunretsu LE+DD Jinkaku (分裂LE+DD人格)" (From the album Rentrer en Soi.)	4:04
6.	"Amongst Foolish Enemies" (From the album The Bottom of Chaos.)	2:59
7.	"Taiyou no Todokanai Basho (太陽の届かない場所)" (From the EP Kein no Hitsugi.)	4:29
8.	"Tsuki ga Maioriru Koto no Nai Daichi (月が舞い降りる事のない大地)" (Original.)	4:09
9.	"The Abyss of Despair" (From the album The Bottom of Chaos.)	2:40
10.	"Wither" (From the album Sphire Croid.)	4:33
11.	"Thorny Rain Break" (From the album The Bottom of Chaos.)	5:13
12.	"Jude" (From the album Rentrer en Soi.)	4:07
13.	"Ichigo Oblate (苺オブラート)" (From the single Ichigo Oblate.)	3:15
14.	"Last word 「 」" (From the album Sphire Croid.)	4:01
15.	"I Hate Myself and Want to Die" (From the album The Bottom of Chaos.)	4:14
16.	"Zenkei Iro Kusari Hateru Ima, Yuiitsu... (全景色腐り果てる今、唯一…)" (Original.)	6:19
