= Jun (musician) =

Japanese musician and singer-songwriter

- Also known as: Attic
- Born: November 17, 1983 (age 42); Kobe, Hyōgo, Japan
- Genres: Alternative rock; Pop rock; Progressive rock; Gothic rock
- Occupations: Musician; Singer-songwriter
- Instruments: Guitar; Vocals
- Years active: 2001–present
- Labels: Under Code Production/Free-Will; Daiki Sound; Cloud; God Child
- Formerly of: Kisaki & Kansai Kizoku; Phantasmagoria; Toshi with T-Earth

Jun (stylized as JUN) is a Japanese visual kei rock musician and singer-songwriter who is currently a guitarist of Gotcharocka. He was previously in the bands Se'lavy, Mar'derayla, Kisaki & Kansai Kizoku, Phantasmagoria, Toshi with T-Earth and Spiv States. He has also released solo material under his own name and the alias Attic.

== Band history ==
=== Se'lavy and Mar'derayla ===
Jun's first known band was Se'lavy. Not much is known about them except that Iori was also in the group. His second band Mar'derayla formed in 2002 and was signed to Under Code Production, a sublabel of Free-Will run by Jun's future bandmate Kisaki. The group also contained Iori on guitar, Hayato on vocals, Hagane on bass and Rui on drums. Their debut mini-album Kiseki... Ring was released in May 2003, Rui left soon after and was replaced by Toki in June. They announced they would be disbanding after the release of "Love & Peace & Horror" on March 10, 2004, but officially disbanded on August 1.

=== Phantasmagoria ===
In 2004, Jun approached bassist Kisaki to start a band together, Phantasmagoria. Having already been through many visual kei bands by this point, Kisaki said it was Jun who reignited his love of bands; "He was an excellent guitarist, and the songs he created were cool. I compose music by myself, but I have always liked bands where the guitarist is the main composer, so I thought of Jun as the sound master of the band." They disbanded in 2007, but reunited for special shows in the following few years.

=== Solo ===
When Phantasmagoria disbanded in 2007, Jun quickly started releasing solo material under the name Attic (stylized as "attic"). The first release was Atomic Smile on March 7 on Under Code Productions. This was followed by the Mechanical Ugly Gang on December 17. He then released the single "Look for "Mr. Name"" on August 6, 2008, under his own name on the label Daiki Sound. It came in two editions, each containing a different A-side.

=== Spiv States ===
Spiv States (stylized as "SPIV STATES" and previously as "spiv states") was formed as a duo in November 2009 with Jun on vocals and guitar and his longtime friend Iori also on guitar. They had their first show on November 18 and released their debut single "Viva Sonic" in December. Spiv States became the first band signed to the record label Cloud in April 2010 and released the single "Flavor" on August 25, which featured former Plastic Tree drummer Hiroshi Sasabuchi. Their next single "Glider" also featured Hiroshi. September 22, 2010 was the last show with Iori, as he left the group due to bad health caused by a herniated disc in his back. Guitarist Ryo, bassist Zechs and drummer Seiya joined Spiv States in December. However, they all decided to leave the group and had their last concert on July 13, 2011. That same day was the release of the mini-album Futari no Hoshi, which featured former Die in Cries bassist Takashi and Sads drummer Go. It included the song "Always", which was written after the 2011 Tōhoku earthquake and tsunami. Jun continued Spiv States as the only official member with revolving support musicians. In 2012, he announced that Spiv States will be taking a break from all activities and leave the Maverick DC Label.

=== Gotcharocka ===
In May 2012, Jun formed the supergroup Gotcharocka (stylized as "GOTCHAROCKA") with former Vidoll vocalist Jui and former Charlotte guitarist Toya (ex-Charlotte). Bassist Shingo (ex-Sugar) was also part of the lineup, until leaving the band in 2014. Gotcharocka is signed to God Child Records, which was founded by D vocalist Asagi. They contributed a cover of "Oblaat" to the 2013 Hide tribute album Tribute II -Visual Spirits-.

== Spiv States members ==
- Jun – vocals, guitar, songwriter

=== Former members ===
- Seiya – support bass
- Mikami – support drums
- Iori – guitar (2009–2010)
- Ryo – guitar (2010–2011)
- Zechs (ゼクス) – bass (2010–2011)
- Seiya (聖也) – drums (2010–2011)

== Discography ==
With Mar'derayla

- Kiseki... Ring (軌跡...ring; May 10, 2003)
- ""Jyakukou" Rest" (「寂光」rest; August 10, 2003)
- "Love & Peace & Horror" (March 10, 2004)
- -"Senzai"... Marvel- (-「潜在」...marvel-; May 26, 2004)
- "Romantist Carnival" (July 21, 2004, split single with Karen)

With Phantasmagoria

Phantasmagoria discography

As Attic

- Atomic Smile (March 7, 2007)
- Mechanical Ugly Gang (December 19, 2007) Oricon Ranking: #86 (Type B)

As Jun

- "Look for "Mr. Name"" (August 6, 2008)

With Spiv States

- "Viva Sonic" (December 2009)
- "Microbe" (January 2010)
- "Mutant" (February 2010)
- Novelty Hunter (May 19, 2010)
- "Flavor" (フレーバー; August 25, 2010)
- "Glider" (グライダー; November 17, 2010)
- Futari no Hoshi (フタリノホシ; July 13, 2011)

With Gotcharocka

- "Gotcha6ka" (July 1, 2012)
- "Hydrag" (August 29, 2012)
- Virginity (December 19, 2012)
- "Poisonous Berry" (March 6, 2013)
- Crisis (July 17, 2013)
- "Short Cake" (December 4, 2013)
- "Gekiai" (June 4, 2014)
- "Alarm" (July 2, 2014)
- "8kaika" (September 23, 2014)
- "GPS" (January 13, 2015)
- "Emotion/Director's Cut" (April 8, 2015)
- Royale (June 17, 2015)
