= Phantasmagoria (band) =

Japanese visual kei rock band

- Origin: Osaka, Japan
- Genres: Gothic rock; alternative rock; progressive rock; dark wave
- Years active: 2004–2007, 2008, 2009, 2010–2011
- Labels: Under Code Production
- Past members: Riku; Jun; Iori; Kisaki; Matoi; Shion
- Website: Official website

Phantasmagoria was a Japanese visual kei rock band formed in Osaka in November 2004, by bassist Kisaki and guitarist Jun. They became one of the three biggest bands on Kisaki's own independent record label, Under Code Production.

== History ==
Phantasmagoria was formed in November 2004, after guitarist Jun approached bassist Kisaki about starting a band together. Having already been through many visual kei bands by this point, Kisaki said it was Jun who reignited his love of bands; "He was an excellent guitarist, and the songs he created were cool. I compose music by myself, but I have always liked bands where the guitarist is the main composer, so I thought of Jun as the sound master of the band." Jun's former Mar'derayla bandmate Iori joined them on guitar. Before settling on Riku as vocalist, Kisaki considered future Sadie frontman Mao. Upon formation, it was announced that Phantasmagoria would be Kisaki's final band, which the bassist said was to show how committed he was to it. Their first single "Material Pain" was released in an issue of the music magazine Shoxx on December 21 of that same year. The following day the group released its first maxi-single, "Moonlight Revival". Phantasmagoria was featured on the cover of visual kei magazine Cure, one month after their formation, becoming one of the fastest-rising indie bands to appear on the cover of a magazine.

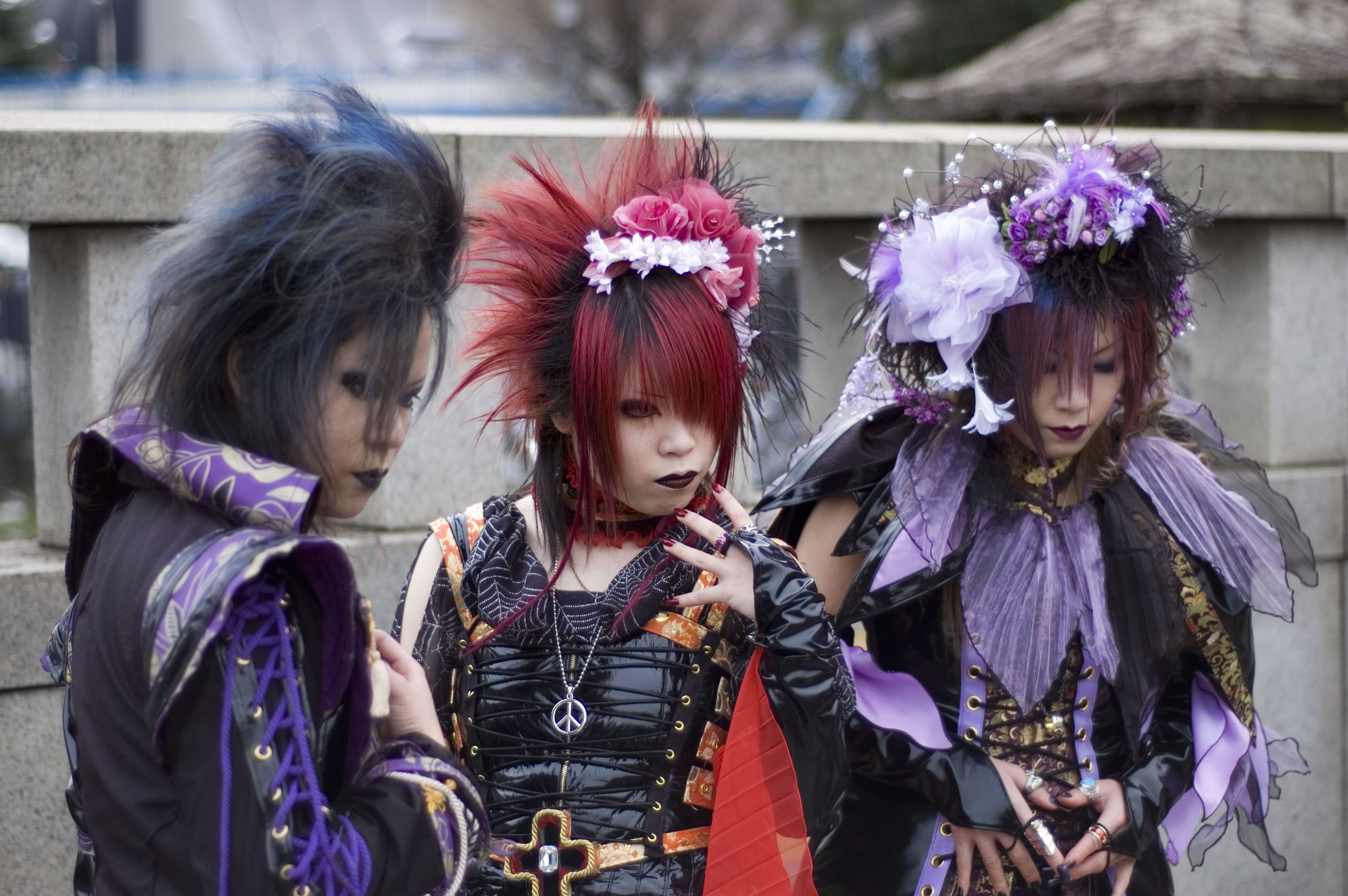
Cosplayer of Matoi and two of Kisaki

Kisaki said the 2006 release of the trilogy – "Kousou Kyoku", "Kyousou Kyoku", and "Gensou Kyoku" – was a turning point for the band; "We spent a lot of time discussing and creating these songs, which had their own color and depth. We paid great attention to the music videos too, as we didn't want to just perform live but also create something that would endure over time. We aimed to make each song stand out, not just as part of an album, but as something people would want to listen to individually." The trilogy resulted in a noticeable amount of new fans for Phantasmagoria and there were plans for them make their major label debut with a single release of "Kami Uta". However, when Kisaki was arrested that year and convicted of tax evasion, these plans and those for their fellow Under Code Production bands Vidoll and 12012 to also sign to major record labels were scrapped as a result. Kisaki said he apologized to the other members of Phantasmagoria and that they were very understanding, but he did not want to keep aiming for higher goals in a state of burden on them. So the band decided to disband after one last nationwide tour. Kisaki describes that tour as legendary; "The last tour was about having pure fun and creating good memories together. That was the most important thing. The atmosphere among the members during the tour was good. We sold out at all the major cities." "We toured the nation, including the first live music club I played in my hometown, the Wakayama Prefectural Cultural Hall where I first saw Tokunaga Hideaki, and finally at the Osaka International Exchange Center, our base of operations. By having a disbandment live, Phantasmagoria became a legendary phantom band." That final concert was held on August 31, 2007, and the tribute album Tribute to Phantasmagoria was released on October 17, 2007. Kisaki retired from performing to concentrate on managing Under Code Production; he studied management and produced various bands. Riku formed the band Chariots in 2007.

However, thousands of fans petitioned for them to return, and Phantasmagoria announced a show in Tokyo on August 31, 2008. Shortly after this announcement, they were invited to perform at Ajinomoto Stadium as part of the Hide Memorial Summit on May 3. Kisaki said they could not refuse an offer to participate in a memorial for Hide, who had a large influence on them; "We couldn't refuse such a significant stage offered by Hide. Despite some backlash, we were grateful to be part of the event and contribute to livening it up for the people we respected." Past New Phase, a second tribute album to the band, was released on August 20, 2008.

Phantasmagoria reunited again to perform at a show in 2009, and at two in 2010. The first was at Tokyo Cinema Club on December 31, 2009. The second was part of a March 19, 2010 event at Tokyo JCB Hall that commemorated the 30th anniversary of the Rock May Kan venue, and the third was part of the Diamond Dust in Truth ~Aratana Yakusoku~ event at Osaka Big Cat on April 5, 2010. Along with 2010's temporary revival, the band released a mini-album and a single of previously unreleased songs. Seeds of Brain contained four tracks, whereas the single, "Diamond Dust", contained the title track and an instrumental version. In an interview with Shoxx magazine, Kisaki stated "Although we created the songs a while back, we never released them. We included those for hardcore fans who want to listen to all our songs. This is our last release; although I'm not sure if that sounds convincing [grins]. But this time around it's really the end." A "memorial CD" of four unreleased songs entitled "Actuality", was released in two versions on June 16, 2010. The compilation album Wailing Wall 2004-2010 followed on October 26, 2011.

Jun and Iori formed the duo Spiv States in November 2009. Iori left the group in September 2010. Kisaki and Riku formed the band Lin -the End of Corruption World- in 2010. After the "first chapter" of Lin ended in 2013, Kisaki reformed the band as the only original member.

== Members ==
- Riku (戮) – lead vocals, keyboards
  - He was the vocalist, born in Hyōgo Prefecture on January 3, 1978. He was previously in the bands Kawon and Hiskarea and went under the name "Kenji" (研二).
- Jun (JUN) – lead guitar, backing vocals
  - He was a guitarist, born on November 17, 1983, in Kobe. He was previously in the bands Se'lavy and Mar'derayla.
- Iori (伊織) – rhythm guitar, backing vocals
  - He was a guitarist, born on January 10, 1984, in Kobe. He was previously in the bands Se'lavy and Mar'derayla.
- Kisaki (KISAKI) – bass guitar, keyboards, synthesizers, leader
  - He was the bassist and bandleader, born on March 10, 1976, in Kainan, Wakayama. His previous bands include Shey≠de, Stella Maria, La:Sadie's, Mirage, and Syndrome.
- Matoi (纏) – drums, percussion
  - He was the drummer, born on September 25, 1981, in Osaka. He was previously in the bands Kawon and Hiskarea.
- Shion (熾苑) – drums (2004–2005)

== Discography ==
=== Singles ===
- "Material Pain" (December 21, 2004)
- "Moonlight Revival" (December 22, 2004)
- "Never Rebellion" (June 1, 2005) Oricon Singles Weekly Chart Top Position: 83
- "Never Rebellion – Fool's Mate Edition" (July 1, 2005)
- "Mikansei to Guilt" (未完成とギルト; October 19, 2005) Oricon Singles Weekly Chart Top Position: 22
- "Kousoukyoku (Variant Jihad)" (神創曲～Variant Jihad～; January 25, 2006) Oricon Singles Weekly Chart Top Position: 80
- "Kyousoukyoku (Cruel Crucible)" (狂想曲～Cruel Crucible～; February 22, 2006) Oricon Singles Weekly Chart Top Position: 90
- "Gensoukyoku (Eternal Silence)" (幻想曲～Eternal Silence～; March 26, 2006) Oricon Singles Weekly Chart Top Position: 75
- "Under the Veil" (December 13, 2006) Oricon Singles Weekly Chart Top Position: 77
- "Vain" (February 14, 2007)
- "Kisaki Chronicle" (June 21, 2007)
- "Kami Uta" (神歌; July 18, 2007) Oricon Singles Weekly Chart Top Position: 32
- "Vanish..." (August 31, 2008)
- "Diamond Dust" (March 10, 2010)
- "Actuality" (June 16, 2010)

=== Mini-albums ===
- Synthesis Songs (September 20, 2006)
- Sign of Fragment (December 20, 2006)
- Subjective or Ideal (December 20, 2006)
- Seeds of Brain (March 10, 2010)

=== Compilation albums ===
- Splendor of Sanctuary (US Release: October 21, 2005)
- Requiem: Floral Edition (September 5, 2007)
- Requiem: Funeral Edition (September 5, 2007)
- No Imagination (October 10, 2007)
- Dejavu: Sanctuary of Revival (August 20, 2008)
- Wailing Wall 2004-2010 (October 26, 2011)

=== Home videos ===
- Kindling Vol.1 (March 1, 2005)
- Kansai Seiatsu 2004~2005 (関西制圧2004～2005; April 6, 200)
- Geneizou I: After the Moonlight Revival (幻影像I～after the moonlight Revival～; April 6, 2005)
- Yoshigen Yuukoujouyaku (四次元友好条約; July 1, 2005)
- Geneizou II: Sin Screen Film (幻影像2～SIN SCREEN FILM～; August 10, 2005)
- Geneizou III: For Degradation Crowd (幻影像3～for degradation crowd～; December 14, 2005)
- Survivor's Guilt: 2005.10.21&22 USA Houston, Texas Park Plaza Hotel Reliant (June 21, 2006)
- Territory of Divine: 2006.3.27 Shibuya-AX (July 25, 2006)
- Japanesque Rock Collectionz Cure DVD Vol.01 (September 27, 2006)
- Geneizou IV: Chronology Revelation (幻影像4～chronology revelation～; October 18, 2007)
- Creatures in Imagination (November 15, 2006)
- Black-Veil Before Christmas: 2006.12.17 La Foret Museum Roppongi (February 21, 2007)
- Geneizou V: Under the Veil (幻影像5～under the veil～; February 28, 2007)
- At the End of the Rest Period: 2007.2.23 Shibuya-AX (April 25, 2007)
- Shinki: Graduation & Departure (May 30, 2007)
- Eclipse of Myth: 2007.8.31 Osaka Kokusai Kouryuu Senta (-Eclipse of Myth- ~2007.8.31 大阪国際交流センター~; August 31, 2007)
- Reincarnation: Geneizou Kanzenban (REINCARNATION～幻影像完全盤～; September 5, 2007)
- Crystal Finale: 2007.8.27 Tokyo Shibuya-AX (-CRYSTAL FINALE-～2007.8.27 東京SHIBUYA-AX～; October 31, 2007)
- Forbidden: Insanity of the Underworld (November 20, 2008)
- History of Phantasmagoria 2004-2008 (December 24, 2008)
- Diamond Dust in Truth (June 26, 2010)
