= MangaNEXT =

Manga convention in New Jersey, United States

- Status: Defunct
- Venue: Sheraton Meadowland Hotel & Convention Center
- Location: East Rutherford, New Jersey
- Country: United States
- Inaugurated: 2006
- Most recent: 2012
- Attendance: 1,070 in 2006
- Organizer: Universal Animation, Inc.
- Filing status: 501(c)(3)

MangaNEXT was a fan convention focused exclusively on Japanese manga that occurred every other year in New Jersey. It was the only manga convention in the United States. The event was discontinued in favor of AnimeNEXT, which is run by the same organization.

== Programming ==
The convention typically offered an artists alley, burlesque show, dealer's room, and swap meet.

== History ==
MangaNEXT was located at the Crowne Plaza Meadowlands in Secaucus, New Jersey for 2007. In 2008 the convention moved to the Doubletree Somerset Hotel in Somerset, New Jersey for additional space, but suffered from some disorganization and poor communication. The convention in 2012 moved to the Sheraton Hotel in East Rutherford, New Jersey, which had no public transit access.

=== Event history ===
Dates	Location	Atten.	Guests
October 6–8, 2006	Crowne Plaza Meadowlands; Secaucus, New Jersey	1,070	C.B. Cebulski, Tania Del Rio, Carl Gustav Horn, Ali Kokmen, Dallas Middaugh, Mari Morimoto, Tricia Narwani, and Hiroki Otsuka.
October 5–7, 2007	Crowne Plaza Meadowlands; Secaucus, New Jersey		Mari Morimoto, Kensuke Okabayashi, Hiroki Otsuka, and Jason Thompson.
October 31 - November 2, 2008	Doubletree Somerset Hotel; Somerset, New Jersey	1,000+(est)	Misako Rocks!, and Mari Morimoto.
October 29–31, 2010	Hilton East Brunswick; East Brunswick, New Jersey		Ed Chavez, Erin Finnegan, Jacob Grady, Onezumi Hartstein, Juri Hayasaka, Lea Hernandez, Akino Kondoh, M. Alice LeGrow, Nina Paley, Dirk Tiede, and Uzuhi.
February 24–26, 2012	Sheraton Meadowland Hotel & Convention Center; East Rutherford, New Jersey		Yamila Abraham, The Asterplace, James L. Barry, C.R.A.Z.Y.O.T.A.K.U., Ed Chavez, Chipocrite, Ben Dunn, Bill Ellis, Erin Finnegan, Noah Fulmor, Christopher Hart, Lizbeth R. Jimenez, Dave Lister, Tomo Maeda, Dani O'Brien, Jen Lee Quick, Felipe Smith, and Makoto Tateno.

== See also ==
- AnimeNEXT
- List of anime conventions
