= Diamond (12012 album) =

- Special edition cover

Studio album by 12012
- Released: December 12, 2007
- Genres: Hard rock; pop rock
- Length: Special – 50:20; Regular – 53:14
- Language: Japanese
- Label: Universal Music

12012 Albums chronology
Not Obtain+1 / Play Dolls (2006)	Diamond (2007)	Mar Maroon (2009)

Diamond is a full-length album from 12012, released on December 12, 2007. The album was their major label debut, after their move to Universal Music. The album is available in two editions, a regular and special edition; the regular containing a bonus track and the special, a DVD featuring making-of footage, the music video for "Diamond", as well as live footage and a promotional poster.

== Track listing ==
1. "Mr.Liar" – 3:34
2. "The Moon" – 4:33
3. "Screen Out" – 3:25
4. "Last Time" – 4:41
5. "Shine" – 3:37
6. "Empire of the Lagoon" – 3:49
7. "24 Hours" – 3:54
8. "Dispute" – 3:35
9. "Cyclone" (サイクロン) – 4:34
10. "Once Again" – 6:18
11. "Secret Festival" – 4:23
12. "Diamond" (ダイヤモンド) – 4:06
13. "Dream Arch" – 2:55 *

* Not on the special edition
