= Bell Salem =

Bell Salem(ベルサレム)

EP by 12012
- Released: October 10, 2004; December 13, 2006 (Reissue)
- Genres: Hardcore punk, punk rock
- Length: 21:02
- Language: Japanese
- Label: Under Code Productions

12012 chronology
| Increasingly (2004) | Bell Salem(ベルサレム) (2004) | Knight Mare (2004) |

Alternative cover
- Reissue

Bell Salem is the second EP by the band 12012, released on October 10, 2004, being the first release of a three-month release campaign.

== Track listing ==
1. "Burn" - 5:41
2. "Ame -Sogi Otosareta Kankaku" - 4:27
3. "Ms Vampire" - 4:42
4. "Epi" - 1:19
5. "Un Insomnia" - 4:53

== Personnel ==
- Wataru Miyawaki – lead vocals
- Hiroaki Sakai – guitar
- Yūsuke Suga – guitar
- Tomoyuki Enya – bass
- Tōru Kawauchi – drums

== Notes ==
- Bell Salem (ベルサレム) was reissued in 2006, along with Knight Mare and Shin -Deep-
- Only 3000 copies of the album were pressed.
