= Play Dolls =

- B-type

Studio album by 12012
- Released: February 1, 2006 (JP); March 9, 2007 (EU)
- Recorded: Ars Studio
- Genre: Alternative metal; alternative rock; hardcore punk
- Length: 47:47
- Language: Japanese
- Label: Under Code Productions (JP); Gan-Shin (EU)
- Producer: 12012

12012 Albums chronology
Not Obtain+1 (2006)	Play Dolls (2006)	Diamond (2007)

Alternative cover
- A-type

Play Dolls is, along with Not Obtain+1, the first full-length album from Japanese rock band 12012. The album was simultaneously released with Not Obtain+1 on February 1, 2006.

== Track listing ==
Disc One

1. "Hermit" – 4:51
2. "My Room Agony" – 5:29
3. "Wriggle Girls" – 5:06
4. "Icy ~Cold City~" – 4:24
5. "With Shallow" – 4:41
6. "Melancholy" – 3:34
7. "Cheeky Doll" – 5:33
8. "Calf Love" – 4:16
9. "The Swim" – 5:33
10. "Queer Passion" – 4:20

Disc Two (DVD, Type A only)

1. "Icy ~Cold City~" (Music Video) – 4:24

Disc Two (CD, Type B only)

1. "See-Saw"
