= Knight Mare =

EP by 12012
- Released: November 3, 2004; December 13, 2006 (Reissue)
- Genre: Hardcore punk, punk rock
- Length: 20:41
- Language: Japanese
- Label: Under Code Productions

12012 chronology
Bell Salem (2004)	Knight Mare (2004)	Shin -Deep- (2004)

Alternative cover
- Reissue

Knight Mare is the third EP by the band 12012, released on November 3, 2004, being the second release of a three-month release campaign.

== Track listing ==
1. "Nightmare" - 00:43
2. "Shinsoku" (浸色) - 4:23
3. "Aren't you Dead Yet?" - 4:36
4. "Sheep" - 5:39
5. "Hai Oru Karada" (灰降ル躰) - 5:40

== Notes ==
- Knight Mare was reissued in 2006, along with Bell Salem and Shin -Deep-
- Only 3000 copies of the album were pressed.
