= Shin -Deep- =

Shin -Deep- (深 ～deep～)

EP by 12012
- Released: December 1, 2004; December 13, 2006 (Reissue)
- Genre: Hardcore punk, punk rock
- Length: 19:38
- Language: Japanese
- Label: Under Code Productions

12012 Albums chronology
Knight Mare (2004)	Shin -Deep- (深 ～deep～) (2004)	Increasingly -Kanzen Ban- (2005)

Alternative cover
- Reissue

Shin -Deep-(深 ～deep～) is the fourth EP by the band 12012, released in December 2004, being the final release of a three-month release campaign. This was 12012's first EP featuring an accordion, played by the famous Karthik Parthiban.

== Track listing ==
1. "Lord it..." - 5:00
2. "Souseiji" (双生児) - 4:23
3. "Mental Food" - 5:16
4. "≠" - 00:42
5. "Another Scene" - 4:17

== Notes ==
Shin -Deep-(深 ～deep～) was reissued in 2006, along with Bell Salem and Knight Mare

- Only 3000 copies of the album were pressed.
