= Ain Soph (disambiguation) =

Ain Soph in Kabbalah is God prior to His self-manifestation in the production of any spiritual Realm.

Ain Soph may also refer to:

- Ain Soph Mudlib, the core software for the Lost Souls MUD
- Ain Soph Aur (album) by Rentrer en Soi
- Ain Soph, Japanese jazz fusion/progressive rock band
- Ain Soph, Italian rock band
- Ain Soph (אֵין סוֹף), the 'seed' sigil of Rose + Croix: S:.V:.V:. (Sodalitas Vulturis Volantis) 1st Degree "Infantes".
