= Mar Maroon =

Studio album by 12012
- Released: March 11, 2009
- Genre: Hard rock; pop rock
- Length: 55:00
- Label: Universal Music/Nayutawave Records

12012 chronology
Diamond (2007)	Mar Maroon (2009)	Seven (2010)

Singles from Mar Maroon
- 1. "Merry Go World" Released: April 16, 2008; 2. "太陽 (Taiyō)" Released: August 20, 2008; 3. "逢いたいから.... (Aitai Kara...)" Released: October 29, 2008; 4. "As" Released: January 21, 2009; 5. "Hallelujah" Released: February 18, 2009

Mar Maroon is the 4th full-length album by rock band 12012, released on March 11, 2009.

== Track listing ==
1. The World
2. DNA
3. As
4. スマイルアゲイン (Smile Again)
5. Merry Go World
6. Psycho Virus
7. 逢いたいから.... (Aitai Kara...)
8. SYSTEM [0] DOWN
9. 太陽 (Taiyō)
10. Generation
11. I Deal
12. Hallelujah -Album Ver.-
13. 願い (Negai)
