= Sword Records, Inc. =

Sword Records, Inc. was an independent record label based in Tokyo, Japan, until it closed in 2022. The label managed 4 bands; ALvino, D'espairsRay, DuelJewel, and Vidoll.

Sword was founded in 2007, after the dissolution of Sweet Child Records, the label responsible for Luna Sea (management only) and D'espairsRay. Sword has a close relationship with many other record labels; Universal Music Japan has been contracted to distribute D'espairsRay and DuelJewel, and Crown Records distributes Vidoll and ALvino.
