= Not Obtain+1 =

Studio album by 12012
- Released: February 1, 2006
- Recorded: Ars Studio
- Genre: Alternative metal; alternative rock; hardcore punk
- Length: 46:43
- Language: Japanese
- Label: Under Code Productions
- Producer: 12012

12012 Albums chronology
Increasingly -Kanzen Ban- (2005)	Not Obtain+1 (2006)	Play Dolls (2006)

Not Obtain+1 is the first full-length album from Japanese rock band 12012 along with Play Dolls. The album was simultaneously released with Play Dolls on February 1, 2006. Not Obtain+1 features many of the singles and distributed CDs released prior to February, 2006.

== Track listing ==
1. "Incur..." – 5:05
2. "Shounen to Orchestra" (少年とオーケストラ) – 4:41
3. "Suisou no Naka no Kanojo" (水槽の中の彼女) – 4:34
4. "Newspaper" – 4:49
5. "Ray ~Hidari Mawari no Kaichuudokei~ (Ray ~左回りの懐中時計~) – 5:22
6. "Vomit" – 3:30
7. "Swallow" – 4:37
8. "Sick" – 4:45
9. "Knife" (ナイフ) – 4:13
10. "Shower" – 5:07
