= Rentrer en Soi =

Japanese visual kei rock band

Background information
- Origin: Japan
- Genres: Progressive rock; alternative rock; gothic rock; metalcore
- Years active: 2001–2008
- Label: Free-Will
- Past members: Satsuki; Takumi; Shun; Ryo; Mika; Ao
- Website: rentrer-en-soi.com

Rentrer en Soi (リエントール アン ソイ) was a Japanese visual kei rock band active from 2001 to 2008. In French, the band's name can be literally translated as "to enter in yourself/entering yourself" although this is not grammatically correct. The band was composed of five members, and had seen only one member change.

== History ==
In 2001, the band started out with only four members—Satsuki, Takumi, Ryo, and Ao. In March 2003, Mika joined the band as the drummer and not long after they caught interest of Yukari from Baiser to be their producer. At the end of a tour in February 2004, Ao left the group due to "undesirable behavior". He was replaced by Shun within a month. At the end of that year the band started recording what would be their first album, Sphire Croid, released in early 2005. Later that year two EPs were released, Astre no Ito and Kein no Hitsugi, then Yukari stopped being their producer.

The following year the band released its second album, Rentrer en Soi. The band was signed to European record label, Gan-Shin in 2006, and later to the American division of Free-Will. In 2007, the band's final studio album, The Bottom of Chaos, was released in Japan as well as Europe.

On October 19, 2007, the band played at the Oni-Con convention in Houston, Texas. This was their first concert in the United States.

2008 began with the announcement of their single, "Stigmata", released in March, as well as a coupling tour, "Tour 2008 Death Match", with Unsraw through Japan. The band was announced for the Free-Will event, "Clash Against Commercialism" at Nokia Theatre Times Square in New York City, however the event was cancelled two weeks prior due to difficulty obtaining visas for the musicians. Shortly after, Rentrer en Soi again announced they would perform in the United States for the AnimeNEXT convention.

On September 17, 2008, Rentrer en Soi announced that they would be breaking up. In October they released a final EP, Megiddo, a best-of album titled Ain Soph Aur on November 19, 2008 and their last live was planned for December 25, 2008. The track list for Ain Soph Aur, their best-of album, cannot be viewed on their website. Ain Soph Aur features Kuuhaku no Joukei, a track that was not originally included on Yurikago, however it was featured as a PV on Cinema Cradle.

Satsuki started a solo career and became the vocalist of Kisaki Project, while Takumi and Mika both joined the supergroup Sukekiyo in 2014.

== Members ==
- Satsuki (砂月) – vocals (2001–2008)
- Takumi (匠) – lead guitar (2001–2008)
- Shun (瞬) – rhythm guitar (2004–2008)
- Ryo (遼) – bass guitar (2001–2008)
- Mika (未架) – drums (2003–2008)

Former members

- Ao (蒼) – rhythm guitar (2001–2004)

== Discography ==
=== Albums ===
- Sphire Croid (January 26, 2005)
- Rentrer en Soi (May 31, 2006)
- The Bottom of Chaos (August 1, 2007)
- Ain Soph Aur (November 19, 2008)

=== Extended plays ===
- Yurikago (ゆりかご) (31 January 2004)
- Kein no Hitsugi (Keinの棺) (24 August 2005)
- Astre no Ito (Astreの絲) (24 August 2005)
- Megiddo (22 October 2008)

=== Singles ===
"Hajimari no Namida no Oto ga Kaze ni Kisareru Yoru ni..." (初まりの涙の音が風に消される夜に...) (22 August 2001)
| No. | Title | Length |
|---|---|---|
| 1. | "En Soi" |
| 2. | "Rainy Blood" |

"Hitsuu Kizuato" (悲痛傷痕) (27 March 2002)
| No. | Title | Length |
|---|---|---|
| 1. | "Fuyuu Tsuisou" (浮遊追想) |
| 2. | "Hoshikuzu no Rasen" (星屑の螺旋) |
| 3. | "Fuyuu Tsuisou -Metal Float Mix-" (浮遊追想～Metal Float Mix～) |

"Hoshikuzu no Rasen -ReSpirial-" (星屑の螺旋 -ReSpirial-) (16 March 2003, distributed single)
| No. | Title | Length |
|---|---|---|
| 1. | "Hoshikuzu no Rasen -ReSpirial-" (星屑の螺旋 -ReSpirial-) |

"Ichigo Oblaat" (苺オブラート) (16 March 2003, distributed single)
| No. | Title | Length |
|---|---|---|
| 1. | "Ichigo Oblaat" (苺オブラート) |

"Shinwa" (神話) (16 March 2003, distributed single)
| No. | Title | Length |
|---|---|---|
| 1. | "Shinwa" (神話) |

"Sakura Mai -Yume no Naka Mezamereba" (桜舞～夢の中目覚めれば～) (1 May 2003, distributed single)
| No. | Title | Length |
|---|---|---|
| 1. | "Hamon Tsutau Memai" (波紋伝う眩暈) |

"Jutai Kokuchi – La Renaissance" (受胎告知～La Renaissance) (Also known as "Secret Strawberry Garden" – 10 February 2004, distributed single)
| No. | Title | Length |
|---|---|---|
| 1. | "The Flow of Time -Out of Cradle-" |
| 2. | "Ichigo Oblaat - Remain" (苺オブラート～Remain) |
| 3. | "Ichigo Oblaat - Secret Strawberry Garden" (苺オブラート～Secret Strawberry Garden) |

"Wither" (27 October 2004)
| No. | Title | Length |
|---|---|---|
| 1. | "Wither" |
| 2. | "Season" |
| 3. | "Karappo no Hako" (からっぽの箱) |

"Zenkeshiki Kusai Hateru Ima, Yuiitsu..." (全景色腐り果てる今、唯一…) (27 February 2005, distributed single)
| No. | Title | Length |
|---|---|---|
| 1. | "Zenkeshiki Kusai Hateru Ima, Yuiitsu..." (全景色腐り果てる今、唯一…) |

"Mizu Yume Miru Chouchou" (水夢見る喋々) (25 May 2005)
| No. | Title | Length |
|---|---|---|
| 1. | "Tensei" (転生) |
| 2. | "Mizu Yume Miru Chouchou" (水夢見る喋々) |
| 3. | "Itsuwari no Uzu" (偽りの渦) |

"Protoplasm" (22 February 2006)
| No. | Title | Length |
|---|---|---|
| 1. | "Protoplasm" |
| 2. | "Taiyou no Todokanai Basho -Hitsugi Kara Ito Hikari wo Te ni Shi Mouichido Kaeru Shinkai-" (太陽の届かない場所〜棺から絲 光を手にしもう一度還る深海〜) |
| 3. | "Tsuki de Namida" (月で涙 Inorganic Sanctuary mix) |

"Karasu Iro no Taiji" (25 April 2006)
| No. | Title | Length |
|---|---|---|
| 1. | "Karasu Iro no Taiji" (鴉色の胎児) |
| 2. | "Protoplasm Re-mix" |
| 3. | "20060225" (live recording of Re-Birth) |

"I Hate Myself and Want to..." (25 October 2006)
| No. | Title | Length |
|---|---|---|
| 1. | "I Hate Myself and Want to..." (different recording to album) |

"Misshitsu to Kodoku ni Dokusareta Yuutsu" (21 December 2006)
| No. | Title | Length |
|---|---|---|
| 1. | "Misshitsu to Kodoku ni Dokusareta Yuutsu" (密室と孤独に毒された憂鬱, different recording to album) |

"The Abyss of Despair" (28 March 2007)
| No. | Title | Length |
|---|---|---|
| 1. | "The Abyss of Despair" |
| 2. | "Murder Intent" |
| 3. | "Re-Birth" (re-recording; original from Yurikago) |
| 4. | "Fenêtre" (Into the Sky remix) |

"Amongst Foolish Enemies" (18 April 2007)
| No. | Title | Length |
|---|---|---|
| 1. | "Amongst Foolish Enemies" (different recording to album) | 3:00 |
| 2. | "Negative Creep" | 3:50 |
| 3. | "Last Word ｢ ｣" (re-recording; original from Sphire Croid) | 4:05 |
| 4. | "Binzume ni Ugomeku Homunculus - Zenkei Iro Kusari Hateru Ima, Yuiitsu... -remix-" (瓶詰めに蠢くホムンクルス -全景色腐り果てる今、唯一･･･remix-) | 6:44 |

"Stigmata" (26 March 2008)
| No. | Title | Length |
|---|---|---|
| 1. | "Stigmata" | 5:05 |
| 2. | "Ushinawareta Fuukei no Yume -Unplugged-" (失われた風景の夢 -UNPLUGGED-, original from The Bottom of Chaos) | 3:39 |
| 3. | "Shinwa -Band Mix-" (神話 -聖痕MIX-, original from The Bottom of Chaos) | 5:27 |

"Unending Sanctuary" (30th July 2008)
| No. | Title | Length |
|---|---|---|
| 1. | "Unending Sanctuary" |
| 2. | "Secret Scars -Beside You-" (original from Sphire Croid) |
| 3. | "To Infinity -Kurikaesareru Soushitsu ni Sasagu Inori" (To Infinity -繰り返される喪失に捧ぐ祈り-, original from The Bottom of Chaos) |

=== DVD ===
- Cinema Cradle (August 25, 2004)
- Millenarianism -The War Of Megiddo- (March 4, 2009)

=== Compilations ===
- Cure - Japanesque Rock Collectionz (July 28, 2004)
  - "Shinwa"
- Duel Shock!! 2~Rentrer en Soi vs Sulfuric Acid - Neo Shaped Children (April 5, 2004)
  - "Tenshi no Namida" and "Into the Sky"
