= Charlotte (Japanese band) =

Japanese oshare kei rock band

- Origin: Japan
- Genres: Pop punk, pop rock
- Years active: 2001–2011
- Past members: Kazuno (deceased); Touya; Mitsujou; Ruka; Takane
- Website: charlotte-club.com

Charlotte (しゃるろっと) was an oshare kei rock band with their concept based around "school"; their official homepage titled "Yokohama Charlotte School" and their visual style consisting of school uniforms. This was reflected in their music which was light hearted punk rock.

== History ==
Charlotte started their activities with a concert at the Yokohama Arena Sound Hole in December 2000. The line-up consisted of Kazuno on vocals, Ruka on bass, Takane on drums along with Mitsujou who joined as a support guitarist.

Mitsujou joined as an official member in February 2001 and this was the official beginning of Charlotte. Their first 'real' concert was on February 21 at the Yokohama 7th avenue. In May they released their first demo-tape, simply called "Charlotte" which was limited and only sold at their concerts. Touya joined the band in November 2001 as the second guitarist. Around this time they also changed the spelling of their name from Charlotte in western characters to "しゃるろっと", which is pronounced the same but written in hiragana.

The band started to perform at various concerts next to bands like DuelJewel, Kra, Kalimero, Loz’a veria and others. In September, they released their first maxi-single, "B Kyuu Idol Densetsu". A few months later in December, they were featured on the compilation album Yougenkyou –Star-.

2003 started, and they contributed to various compilation albums, like Hysteric Media Zone IV and Loop of life III. In April they released their second maxi-single "Yokohama Love Story" which sold out on pre-order, leading to a second pressing. The second pressing, as well as their next single "Otona no Kijun," sold out immediately.

The band's very first one-man (a concert with no opening act) on August 17 at the Takadanobaba area was completely sold out. They followed with a second press of "Otona no Kijun" which included an extra song. In September and November they continued to participate in various concerts, and in October they released a coupling CD with the band Mask, called "Tobe, Tobe Oyuuki". This maxi-single managed to rank 4th on the Oricon indies charts.

On January 1, 2004 Charlotte released their first mini-album, Gakuen Jigoku. On the 11th of the same month they had another one-man concert, this time in the Yokohama Arena Soundhall. In May they released another single, "Koi shinbou mansee!!" which ranked 6th on the Oricon indies charts. They had a one-man tour in August, and they distributed a single on these concerts. The band performed at various events in the following months, and in November they released another coupling CD, this time with the band R*A*P. It was called "Uchuu Gakuen", and it came with an 8-page booklet.

In January 2005 the band released their first set of DVDs called Natsuyasumi no Omoide ga Oppai - Saigo no XX Happyo and released in two versions: Yoko ban and Hama ban. Both DVD’s contained live footage and PV’s of the band, but the content of both DVDs were different from each other. The band released another mini-album in April 2005, called Ryuunen Kettei.

Kazuno, Charlotte's vocalist died after a sudden illness on April 5, 2011.

== Members ==
- Kazuno - Vocals (Deceased)
- Touya - Guitar
- Mitsujou - Guitar
- Ruka - Bass
- Takane - Drums

== Discography ==
Albums & Mini-Albums

- Gakuen Jigoku (学園地獄) 2004-01-01
- Ryuunen Kettei (留年決定) 2005-04-01
- Osharu no Gakkou Ichigoukan (おしゃるの学校 壱号館) 2005-08-10
- Osharu no Gakkou Nigoukan (おしゃるの学校 弐号館) 2005-12-11
- Sharu de Nashi Blues (しゃるでなしブルース) 2006-12-13

Singles

- "B Kyuu Idol Densetsu" (B級アイドル伝説) 2002-09-26
- "Yokohama Love Story" (横浜ラブストーリー) 2003-04-21, 2nd Press 2003-05-21
- "Otona no Kijun" (大人の基準) 2003-07-21, 2nd Press 2003-08-21
- "Koi Shinbou Mansee!!" (恋辛抱マンセー!!) 2004-05-14
- "Yokohama Love Story / Diamond Busaiku" (横浜ラブストーリー/ダイヤモンドブサイク) 2006-09-06, Oricon Single Weekly Ranking: 79

DVDs

- Natsuyasumi no Omoide ga Oppai - Saigo no XX Happyo (Yoko Ban) (夏休みの思い出がおっぱい-横盤-) 2005-01-08
- Natsuyasumi no Omoide ga Oppai - Saigo no XX Happyo (Hama Ban) (夏休みの思い出がおっぱい-浜盤-) 2005-01-08
- Shinban : Bangumi Hajimarutte Hontou Desuka!? (新盤: 番組始まるって本当ですか!?) 2006-04-09
- Jukuban : Bangumi Hajimarutte Hontou Desuka!? (宿盤: 番組始まるって本当ですか!?) 2006-04-09

Demos

- "Charlotte" 2001-05-26
- "Oyuugi Tape" (お遊戯テープ) 2002-02-13
