= Sphire Croid =

Sphire-Croid

Studio album by Rentrer en Soi
- Released: January 26, 2005 (JP)
- Genre: Alternative rock, progressive rock
- Length: 40:00
- Language: Japanese
- Label: Free-Will
- Producer: Yukari

Rentrer en Soi chronology
Yurikago (2004)	Sphire-Croid (2005)	Astre no Ito (2006)

Singles from Sphire-Croid
- 1. "wither" Released: October 2004

Sphire-Croid is the first studio album of the Japanese rock band Rentrer en Soi. It was released on 26 January 2005 in Japan and produced by Yukari, the vocalist of Baiser. On their debut full-length album, Rentrer en Soi take a much more mellow approach to their music compared to the band's later adapted, heavy metal influenced style.

== Track listing ==
All lyrics are written by Satsuki.

No.	Title	Music	Length
1.	"a prelude"	Takumi	5:10
2.	"Crystal letter"	Takumi	3:45
3.	"Taikyou naru Yousoi Yuugi" (胎教なる羊水遊戯)	Shun	4:02
4.	"wither"	Rentrer en Soi	4:33
5.	"Eyes of forest"	Ryo	4:18
6.	"Last word 「 」"	Takumi	3:05
7.	"Usubeniiro" (薄紅色)	Takumi	3:45
8.	"Iconoclasm"	Mika	2:41
9.	"secret scars"	Shun	4:36
10.	"Full Moon"	Ryo	4:05
