= Rentrer en Soi (album) =

Studio album by Rentrer en Soi
- Released: May 5, 2006 (JP); August 28, 2007 (EU)
- Genre: Nu Metal, gothic Metal
- Length: 42:11
- Label: Free-Will (JP); Gan-Shin (EU)
- Producer: Rentrer en Soi

Rentrer en Soi chronology
Kein no Hitsugi (2005)	Rentrer en Soi (2006)	The Bottom of Chaos (2007)

Singles from Rentrer en Soi
- 1. "Protoplasm" Released: February 2006; 2. "Karasuiro no Taiji" Released: April 2006

Rentrer en Soi is the second album by Japanese rock band Rentrer en Soi. It was released on May 31, 2006 in Japan and on August 28, 2007 in Europe.

== Track listing ==
All lyrics are written by Satsuki; all music is composed by Takumi, except where noted.

Disc one
No.	Title	Length
1.	"Kai" (廻)	0:47
2.	"Bunretsu LE+DD Jinkaku" (分裂LE+DD人格)	4:03
3.	"Gi Hadaka Nise Hadaka" (疑裸偽裸)	3:12
4.	"Dead Believe Me"	2:47
5.	"Protoplasm"	5:38
6.	"Gedoku Magaini Suicide" (解毒まがいにSUICIDE)	3:38
7.	"Strawberry Oblaat"	2:35
8.	"Misemono Koya" (見世物小屋)	2:30
9.	"Karasuiro no Taiji" (鴉色の胎児)	4:17
10.	"Seishinshi 13 Dome" (精神死13度目)	2:43
11.	"Jude"	4:07
12.	"Binetsu Shita de Shajitsu Shita Shinsou ha Atesaki Fumei no Tegami to Naru" (微熱下で写実した深層は宛先不明の手紙と成る)	4:18

Disc two (DVD, Japanese limited edition only)
No.	Title	Length
1.	"Protoplasm"
2.	"Karasuiro no Taiji" (鴉色の胎児)
3.	"Bunretsu LE+DD Jinkaku" (分裂LE+DD人格)
