= Tinc (band) =

Japanese visual kei rock band

- Origin: Japan
- Genres: Rock
- Years active: 2003–2008
- Labels: Moff Moff Records, Kreis Sequence Factory
- Past members: Kikasa; Sarino; Kenta; Yuhsuke; Takuma
- Website: Tinc Official website

Tinc (テインク in Katakana) was a visual kei rock band from Tokyo, Japan. Previously known as Shelly Trip Realize, the band formed on February 14, 2003 and were signed to the independent label Kreis Sequence Factory shortly after. Shelly Trip Realize left Kreis on October 17, 2006 and the band changed its name to Tinc on December 10, 2006. Tinc disbanded on April 20, 2008.

== Biography ==
Shelly Trip Realize formed on February 14, 2003 with Sarino on vocals, Mai (舞) on guitar, Kikasa on bass, and Shion (紫音) on drums. They were quickly signed to Kreis Sequence Factory and performed live for the first time together on March 31 at the Shibuya AX. Shelly Trip Realize held their first solo concert or oneman live on May 18 at the Shinjuku LOFT, and sold a demonstration CD titled Lie!! at the event. They released their first single Present on May 21. Shelly Trip Realize released several other singles throughout the first year of their existence.

2004 began with the release of their 4th single Kiss on February 11 and a 1st anniversary live titled Valentine Day Kiss on February 14 at the Harajuku Astro Hall and the release of a special single Passion. Halfway through 2004, Kikasa decided to leave the band. His last performance was on August 13 at the solo concert Blue Vacation held at the Harajuku Astro hall. Later in 2004, Shelly Trip Realize would gain a bassist in Yuhsuke who first was a support member and joined on November 11 formally. In 2004, Mai and Shion changed their names to Kenta and Takuma respectively.

In the beginning of 2005, Shelly Trip Realize worked on a two-man live and released an EP with another visual kei band, Antic Cafe. The live and release were named Shelly Tic Cafe. Shelly Tic Cafe happened on January 11. The band released their first single with bassist Yuhsuke on February 14, it was named P.t. Valentine. They also released their first EP Brilliant World on March 16. This release would be followed by a two-type album release Brilliant World DX and Brilliant World EX on August 10. Their final release of 2005 was the single Darlin' released on December 7.

In 2006 they released the single Milky way☆彡 on April 19 and released a DVD nijiiro jukebox on August 16. They planned a second album release for November 22, but this release was cancelled. On October 17, Shelly Trip Realize left Kreis Sequence Factory. Shelly Trip Realize announced that they were make their future plans known at their next oneman, which was in December. And on December 10, they announced that they were changing their name to Tinc.

By 2007, Tinc had been signed to Moff Moff Records, a new independent label. They released Voyage on March 14, an EP limited to 1000 copies. Tinc held their two first solo lives on March 21 and on March 28. The band reissued Voyage on June 6 and held a solo event on August 21. Tinc held another two-man live on November 8 named Star Box Tinc X Masquerade at the Shibuya Boxx. Tinc released their first single under the name Tinc on December 5, it was titled Cold.

Tinc announced abruptly on March 1 that they would be disbanding at their next oneman live on April 20 at the Takadanobaba AREA. The event was named A-Live: Representation and the band released their last song on CD titled Last Letter at the concert. Tinc released an A-type & B-type concert DVD of their final concert titled A-Live: Representation on July 7.

== Lineup ==
- Sarino – vocals, previously in Michiru project and aioria. Currently working on Annie's Black and solo work.
- Kenta (formerly 舞 or Mai) – guitar, Previously in I've, ギロチン, As' Real, De:Bug (support) and played on the recording of Hi:BRiD's single Butterfly. Currently playing in ARTEMA under the name Kentty.
- Yuhsuke – bass, previously in PuNクレア, currently in Brother.
- Takuma (formerly 紫音 or Shion) – drums, previously in Distray, Laybial, and Syndrome, Takuma has also done solo work in the past under the name Shion. Recently announced joining the band 'ato-saki.

Former members

- Kikasa – bass

== Discography ==
Albums

- Brilliant World EX (August 10, 2005)
- Brilliant World DX (August 10, 2005)
- Brilliant World Live! (November 16, 2005)

EPs

- Brilliant World (March 16, 2005)
- Voyage 1st press (March 14, 2007)
- Voyage 2nd press (June 6, 2007)

Singles

- Present (May 21, 2003)
- Approach (August 13, 2003)
- Night party (August 18, 2003)
- Feel (November 26, 2003)
- Kiss (February 11, 2004)
- Passion (February 14, 2004)
- Dive! (August 4, 2004)
- Pt. Valentine (February 14, 2005)
- Darlin' (December 7, 2005)
- Milky Way (milky way☆彡) (April 19, 2006)
- Cold (December 5, 2007)

DVD

- Brilliant World (November 16, 2005)
- Nijiiro Jukebox (虹色ジュークボックス) (August 16, 2006)
- A-Live: Representation (July 7, 2008)

Other releases

- Lie!! (May 18, 2003)
- Profile (August 13, 2004)
- Relic (August 14, 2005)
- Natsu e no tobira (夏への扉) (December 13, 2005)
- Pretty Girl, Pretty Boy (December 13, 2005)
- Private Video (May 26, 2006)
- Believe (2006 or 2007, exact date unknown)
- Last Letter (April 20, 2008)
