= Satsuki (musician) =

Satsuki 砂月
- Genres: Pop, rock
- Instrument(s): Vocals, guitar, piano
- Years active: 2001–present
- Labels: Too Wild, Free-Will
- Formerly of: Rentrer en Soi, Kisaki Project
- Website: linktree.com/SATSUKI_ROCIEL

Satsuki (砂月) is a Japanese musician and singer, best known as vocalist of the visual kei rock band Rentrer en Soi. He was a member of the band from its creation in 2001 until its disbandment in 2008, before launching a solo career in 2009. In 2011, Satsuki formed the duo Moon Stream and joined Kisaki Project. He counts Dir En Grey, Nirvana, and U2 among his musical influences.

== History ==
After Rentrer en Soi disbanded in 2008, Satsuki launched a solo career in 2009. In an interview with JaME, he stated "My former band had a lot more shouting, but for now, I want to sing more beautifully." Satsuki has released four maxi singles, "Awake" on May 9, 2009, "Crystal" on August 21, 2009, "Moon Spiral," on February 14, 2010, and "Innocent" on June 27, 2011. His mini-album Upper Region was released on September 1, 2010.

On July 4, 2009, Satsuki performed at Anime Expo in Los Angeles, California. In September 2009, he performed at Anime Vegas in Las Vegas, Nevada. He also performed at Oni-Con in Houston, Texas, on October 30, 2009, with a special musical appearance by guitarist Tomo Asaha of Echostream.

In June 2011, Satsuki launched the duo Moon Stream with Echostream guitarist Tomo Asaha, with a debut performance at Sacramento, California's Kintoki-Con 2011. Moon Stream headlined Anime Weekend Atlanta in Atlanta, Georgia in September 2011. Also in 2011, Satsuki became the vocalist of Kisaki Project. He released the single "Shouei" with them on November 1, and had his first gig with them on November 27.

In 2012, Kisaki Project feat. Satsuki released the single "Sou ~Twinkle Vitality~" on February 15 and the mini-album Kaishi ~An Ideal of Beauty Desperate~ on October 31. In August 2013, Moon Stream attended Quebec's Otakuthon, performing in a concert on the evening of August 16, and then in an acoustic live session on August 18.

Satsuki's musical contributions also include the theme song "Awake" for the PSP game Amnesia, a visual novel by Otomate. Outside of music, Satsuki appeared in the Japanese filmCool Blue. He also hosts a new monthly visual kei variety show called VisuBara with other visual kei artists, which debuted on August 14, 2011.

== Discography ==
=== Singles ===
"Awake" (May 9, 2009)
No.	Title	Length
1.	"La Lune"	3:57
2.	"Veil of Maria"	4:53
3.	"Awake"	4:08
4.	"In a Lucid Dream"	2:40

"Crystal" (August 21, 2009)
No.	Title	Length
1.	"Crystal"	3:26
2.	"Rain Drop"	2:56
3.	"Heart"	5:54
4.	"Dazzle"	3:23

"Moon Spiral" (February 14, 2010)
No.	Title	Length
1.	"Moon Spiral"	4:34
2.	"Pray for the Sun"	4:33
3.	"You"	3:33
4.	"Closs of Yellow"	3:32

"Innocent" (June 27, 2011)
No.	Title	Length
1.	"Innocent"	4:51
2.	"Strawberry Summer"	3:42

"Sympathy" (August 24, 2011)
No.	Title	Length
1.	"Sympathy"	3:41
2.	"Awake (Upper Region Ver.)"	4:32

"Romance" (December 26, 2011)
No.	Title	Length
1.	"Romance"	3:53

"Fate/Inside" (February 29, 2012)
No.	Title	Length
1.	"Fate"
2.	"Inside"

"Lily -Tsukikage ni Miserarete-" (April 2, 2014)
No.	Title	Length
1.	"Lily -Tsukikage ni Miserarete-"	3:38
2.	"Brave"	4:19

"Squall" (January 28, 2015)
No.	Title	Length
1.	"Squall"

Artemis (August 27, 2015)
No.	Title	Length
1.	"Crossover"	1:46
2.	"Artemis"	3:50
3.	"Selene"	4:12

=== Albums & EP ===
Upper Region (September 1, 2010)
No.	Title	Length
1.	"Awake (Upper Region Ver.)"	4:33
2.	"Ryūshi ni Tokete Nagareru Namida to Memai no Sō ni Ranhansha Suru Saisei no Koe (粒子に溶けて流れる涙と眩暈の装に乱反射する再生の声)"	6:30
3.	"Moon Spiral (Upper Region Ver.)"	4:33
4.	"Veil of Maria (Upper Region Ver.)"	5:14
5.	"Horizon"	3:26
6.	"Crystal (Upper Region Ver.)"	3:26

Luminous (January 9, 2013)
No.	Title	Length
1.	"Le Temps Avec..."
2.	"Determination"
3.	"Romance"
4.	"Twilight"
5.	"Inside"
6.	"NVN"
7.	"In a Lucid Dream"
8.	"Fate"
9.	"Sympathy"
10.	"Malachite"
11.	"After Glow"

Squall of Emotions (November 28, 2014)
No.	Title	Length
1.	"Squall"
2.	"Lily -Tsukikage ni Miserarete-"
3.	"Determination"
4.	"Strawberry Summer"
5.	"Veil of Maria"
6.	"Romance"
7.	"La Lune"
8.	"Innocent"
9.	"Horizon"
10.	"Malichite"
11.	"Crystal"
12.	"Heart"
13.	"Twilight"

=== DVD ===
"Moulin Rouge" (April 17, 2013)
No.	Title	Length
1.	"Romance"
2.	"Sympathy"
3.	"Inside"
4.	"Twilight"
5.	"Fate"
6.	"You"
7.	"Awake (Upper Region Ver.)"
8.	"Ryuushi ni Toketenagareru Namida to Memai no sou ni Ranhanshasuru Saisei no Koe..."
9.	"Rain Drop"
10.	"Official Bootleg LIVE at Poland blue note at 2012.03.02"
11.	"Offshot 2010"
