= Baiser =

Japanese visual kei rock band

- Origin: Japan
- Genres: Progressive rock; pop rock; gothic rock
- Years active: 1991–2001
- Labels: Nippon Crown; Sony Records
- Past members: Yukari; Mizuki; Katsura; Rei; Shaisuke

Baiser (French for kiss) was a Japanese visual kei rock band formed in 1991 by vocalist Yukari. They played concerts in the Tokyo area before debuting on an independent label in 1994.

== History ==
The original line-up for Baiser featured Hiderou and Akane on guitar, and Haiji on bass. Gaz (former drummer of Malice Mizer) was their support drummer until 1993, when he was replaced by Akihiro. In 1993 they released their first demo tape "Daraku", distributing only 100 copies. Their second demo tape, "Fleurs des Fleurs", was released a year later. In 1994 they released their first album, Seppun Kuchizuke.

In 1995, Akihiro was replaced by Toshimi. Following this change, Baiser recorded their second album, Ash. It reached number two on Oricon's independent album chart. They also released the video Pictures, which they did everything by themselves, such as; filming, scripting, editing and mixing. That year, a few of their songs appeared on compilation albums such as Sacred Seed, Turn Over Eagle Vision and Turn Over Crow Vision.

In 1996, Toshimi left the band and the other members decided to split up. However, Yukari began to recruiting members for a new Baiser. The band reformed in September 1997 with Shaisuke on bass (former Penicillin), Katsura on drums (former Shazna), and Mizuki and Rei on guitar (both former Iris).

In 1998 Baiser released two singles, three mini-albums, a full album, and three videos. In May 1999 Baiser signed with the major label Fortune Records Japan (a division of Sony Music Entertainment and released their debut single "Prism". "Prism" was used as the opening theme for the anime Gokudo. and was produced by Hakuei of Penicillin.

They released two more maxi-singles, "Angel" and "Doku", and their first and final major album, Hana. That same year they also had their first major tour, Prismatic Colors.

In May 2000 they released their last maxi-single, "Pegasus". Following a period of no releases, Baiser announced that they were going to disband on January 5, 2001.

== After Baiser ==
Yukari and Mizuki formed the band Endorphine with two other members, but they disbanded in 2003 after only three releases.

Rei, Shaisuke and Katsura stayed together as well, forming the band Swallowtail. Rei, who adopted the name Sin, became the vocalist, and former Baiser member Hiderou joined as their support guitarist. The group disbanded shortly thereafter. Katsura started the band Vinett in 2002, which disbanded in 2005.

Shaisuke died on July 16, 2001. The cause of death was not released to the public. He had been checked into the hospital some 3 or 4 days prior.

Yukari has remained active in the music scene and produced some of Rentrer en Soi's releases. Katsura had supported Rentrer en Soi as a session drummer in their beginnings too, before Mika joined. He appears on Rentrer en Soi's few first singles.

== Discography ==
=== Single ===
- "Kuchizuke" (くちづけ) (July 29, 1998) Oricon Single Chart Peak Position: 40
- "Kuchizuke - Lawson special Edit" (Maxi-Single) (September 1998)
- "Psychoballet" (November 26, 1998) Oricon Single Chart Peak Position: 59
- "Paradise Lost ~ The Case of Adam" (Maxi-Single) (April 1999)
- "Prism" (May 21, 1999) Oricon Single Chart Peak Position: 50
- "Angel" (エンジェル) (August 11, 1999) Oricon Single Chart Peak Position: 92
- "Doku" (毒) (October 1, 1999)
- "Pegasus" (ペガサス) (May 3, 2000)

=== Mini album ===
- En Fleur (February 1998)
- Kaleidoscope (April 1998)

=== Album ===
- Seppun (接吻) (June 12, 1994)
- Ash (February 1995)
- Terre (August 1998) Oricon Album Chart Peak Position: 37
- La Luna (October 1998)
- Hana (November 1999)

=== Videos ===
- [Pictures-Virtue Style] (video) + CD [PICTURES-Vice Style] (August 1995)
- Kaleidoscope Picture ~Kuchizuke~ (Video) (April 1998)
- Kaleidoscope Picture ~Glass~ (Video) (April 1998)
- Utopia (Video Box) (October 1998)
