= The Bottom of Chaos =

Studio album by Rentrer en Soi
- Released: August 1, 2007 (JP); September 28, 2007 (EU)
- Genre: Progressive rock, gothic rock
- Length: Disc 1: 45:24
- Label: Free-Will (JP); Gan-Shin (EU)
- Producer: Rentrer en Soi

Rentrer en Soi chronology
Rentrer en Soi (2006)	The Bottom of Chaos (2007)

Alternative cover
- Limited edition

Singles from The Bottom of Chaos
- 1. "I Hate Myself and Want to..." Released: October 2006; 2. "Misshitsu to Kodoku ni Dokusareta Yuutsu" Released: December 2006; 3. "The Abyss of Despair" Released: March 2007; 4. "Amongst Foolish Enemies" Released: April 2007

The Bottom of Chaos is an album by Japanese rock band Rentrer en Soi. It was released on August 1, 2007 in Japan and on September 28 in Europe.

== Track listing ==
All lyrics are written by Satsuki; all music is composed by Takumi, except where noted.

Disc one
No.	Title	Length
1.	"I Was Damned"	3:43
2.	"Just Mad Pain"	4:18
3.	"Ushinawareta Fuukei no Yume" (失われた風景の夢)	3:20
4.	"The Abyss of Despair"	2:42
5.	"Thorny Rain Break"	5:13
6.	"Misshitsu to Kodoku ni Dokusareta Yūtsu" (密室と孤独に毒された憂鬱)	3:43
7.	"Misery Loves Poisonous Blue" (Shun)	3:35
8.	"Amongst Foolish Enemies"	3:04
9.	"Shinwa" (神話)	5:25
10.	"To Infinity" (Mika)	3:58
11.	"Growl"	2:11
12.	"I Hate Myself and Want to Die"	4:18
13.	"Murder Intent" (European edition only)	2:34
14.	"Last Word []" (Re-recording, European edition only)	4:05

Disc two (DVD, Japanese limited edition only)
No.	Title	Length
1.	"Just Mad Pain"	4:22
2.	"Murder Intent" (live clip collage)	2:39
3.	"Amongst Foolish Enemies"	3:02
4.	"The Abyss of Despair"	2:42
5.	"Last Word []" (Re-recording)	4:08

Disc two (European edition only)

1. "Just Mad Pain" – 4:22

== Personnel ==
- Toshiro Honkawa – recording, mixing
- Toshiaki Ishii – recording, mixing
- Takahiro Uchida – mastering
- Kyo – vocal coach (referred to as "agitator")
- Daisuke (Kagerou) – vocal coach
- Dynamite Tommy – executive producer

== Notes ==
- The title of "I Hate Myself and Want to Die" is a homage to Nirvana's song of the same name.
