= Vidoll =

Japanese visual kei rock band

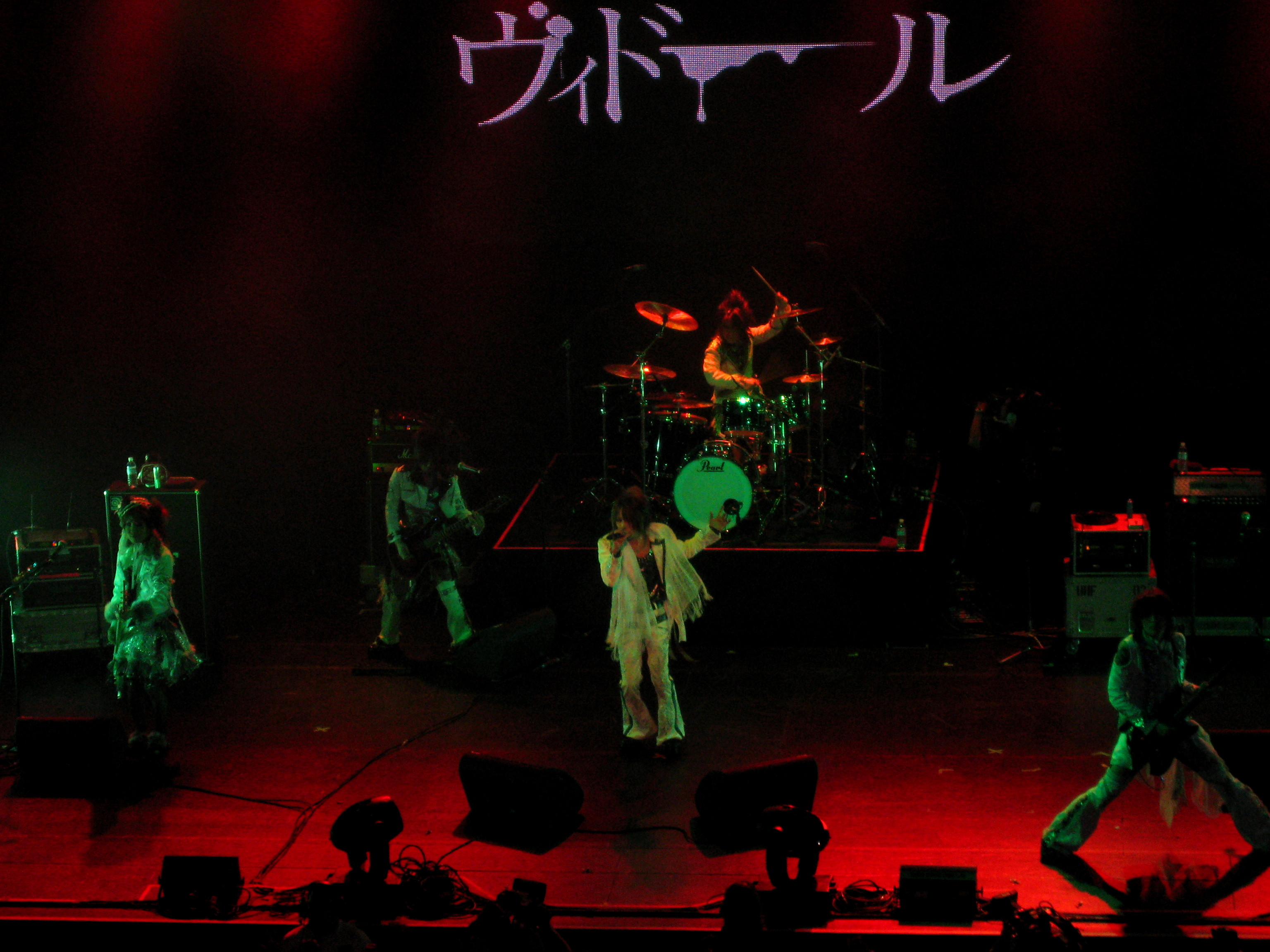
- Vidoll performing in Los Angeles, 2007

Background information
- Origin: Osaka, Japan
- Genres: Experimental rock; alternative rock; progressive rock; pop rock; gothic rock; hard rock
- Years active: 2002–2011
- Labels: Nippon Crown (JP, 09-11); Sword Records (JP, 07-08); Under Code (JP, 03-07); Matina (JP, 02-03); Gan-Shin (EU); Mabell (EU)
- Past members: Jui; Rame; Tero; Shun; Gil; Ayano; Hide; Yukine
- Website: vidoll.jp

Vidoll (Japanese: ヴィドール, Hepburn: Bidōru) was a Japanese visual kei rock band formed in 2002 with the concept "Occult Romance". They were signed to independent labels Matina, Undercode, and Sword Records. After signing with Nippon Crown, they released three albums and had three top 40 singles before disbanding in 2011.

CD Journal describes Vidoll as representative of the visual kei scene, distinguished from other bands by their striking looks and Jui's vocal performance.

== History ==
=== 2002: Matina ===
Vidoll was founded by Rame in 2002. The original, full lineup included vocalist Jui, guitarists Yukine and Ayano, and drummer Tero.

Vidoll's first release was two complementary EPs, Face Mayura and Face Pisaroto, which sold out the same day they were issued. While on Matina, Vidoll also released their first single, "Occult Proposal" in December, and contributed to several compilation CDs.

Vidoll was the last band signed to Matina before it disbanded. The label's manager, Kisaki, was also a musician and juggled label management, producing, bass guitar performances, and songwriting. When Matina dissolved, he considered leaving the music industry altogether, but members of Vidoll visited him, travelling weekly from Tokyo to Osaka, as they still wanted to work with him.

=== 2003 - 2007: Undercode ===
In early 2003, Vidoll joined Kisaki's newly formed Under Code Production, a sublabel of Free-Will.

Vidoll's first release from the new label was a pair of limited edition singles, "If... Rebotomin (Y LV25 25) 475 mg" and "If... Torikabuto (Shikibetsu Code Nashi) 120 mg". Some of the songs were re-released shortly afterward, combined onto the EP "If...Yakubutsu Ranyou Bokumetsu Campaign" in a larger edition. The release was followed by the band's first national tour in Japan, as well as their first solo live show. The band then released their first DVD, Doll Mansion 209 Goushitsu, showcasing their music videos.

Guitarist Ayano left the band in August, and Hide joined as the new guitarist in September.

Gazette, like Vidoll, had its start on Matina, but the Gazette signed to PS Company. The bands reunited with a 10 date tour with in October and both bands shared the cover of Cure magazine in November. This tour solidified Vidoll's place in the visual kei scene, and their Christmas single "Hitokiri no Kurixxxxsu" hit number 79 on the Oricon Weekly Singles Chart.

On March 10, 2004, the single "Wagahai wa, Korosuke Nari..." was released and reached number 4 on the Oricon Independent Chart. After the first press of 10,000 was sold out, a second pressing of 10,000 was released later in the year. On April 28, the French label Mabell released Bijinkei, an 11 track compilation album of Vidoll songs for the European market. In May, Vidoll's vocalist Jui performed in France with Kisaki Project. Vidoll was one of five bands to be selected for "Expect Rush", a yearly publication by Shoxx that catalogs independent visual kei artists. On June 30 both the single "Ningyo" and the concert DVD Gyaku went on sale, and "Ningyo" reached third place on the Oricon Independent Chart.

Vidoll's official fan club "Ningyou Kan" began with a concert on Nov 11, 2004.

On December 15 two mini-albums and a DVD were released. The Mini Albums, Mukashi Natsukashi Ningyoushuu: Sono Ichi (Number One) and Sono Ni (Number Two) featured new recordings of previously released songs with the current lineup. The songs were re-arranged to match how they were being played live, and quickly sold out all 10,000 copies. The DVD Ningyou Kai PV contained two Music Videos, one for "Ningyo" and one for "F-Stein to M".

In March 2005, Vidoll had a solo tour only for members of their fan club, for a total of 8 shows. The Live DVD "Mijin Kakumei~Saishuu Kaukumei Yokokubi 1229~" contained footage from their concert December 29th the previous year.

On June 8, 2005 Mukashi Natsukashi Soushuuhen + Omake Tsuki was released. It contained songs from the previous Mukashi Natsukashi Ningyoushuu mini albums plus an "extra", a music video on a DVD. On July 13 another Live DVD, from their "Roman Kokuhaku" live was released.

At the end of 2005, the singles "Shutdown" and "Chocoripeyes" both reached rank 33 on the Oricon Singles chart.

On April 26, 2006, at the Roman Kokuhaku one-man live, Jui announced that members Hide and Yukine were leaving Vidoll at the end of June. The band took one last tour "Toumeihanzai" before Hide and Yukine left on June 26. The last concert with all the members was recorded and later released as a set of two DVDs through the fan club.

On June 13, 2006 two new members: Shun (of CalorZe and Gossip) and Gil (Lilith), joined Vidoll. Kisaki, the executive manager of Vidoll's label, Under Code Productions, announced that three of the label's bands, including Vidoll, would be "graduating" from the label.

Vidoll's last album on Undercode, "V.I.D ~Very Important Doll~" was released in November.

In an interview with Make Magazine, Kisaki revealed that three Under Code bands, Phantasmagoria, Vidoll, and 12012, were all scheduled for a Major Label Debut together, but it was derailed when Kisaki was arrested and convicted of tax evasion at the end of 2006.

Vidoll had a "Graduation" concert in February 2007, and released a best of album, PV collection, and a DVD of their last live. They signed with another independent label, Sword Records.

=== 2007-2009: Sword Records ===
During Memorial Day weekend, spring of 2007, Vidoll had their US premier at J-rock Revolution in Los Angeles, California. Yoshiki, of X Japan fame, hosted the event, and several other visual kei bands also had their US debut during the course of both nights.

They released their first singles on Sword Records, Innocent Teens and Cloud, as well as releasing a full-length album, Bastard.

On January 7, 2008, Megacon announced that Vidoll would be present at the convention in the USA, held March 7–9, 2008. They did not perform, but had a Q & A panel where they took questions from the audience.

Vidoll released a DVD of their live show held at C.C. Lemon Hall on December 2, 2007

Vidoll held their "Last Indies Solo Live Tokyo Maimu" on Friday, December 19, 2008, at the CCLemon Hall in Shibuya.

=== 2009-2011: Nippon Crown ===
Vidoll went major with the release of "Puzzle Ring", released by Nippon Crown on February 18, 2009.

Jui announced on his official blog that, immediately following the final of the ReSet tour (September 18, 2010), Vidoll would be taking a break for an undisclosed amount of time. He said that, due to a thrombus in his throat, he will be undergoing surgery and recovering.

On January 18, 2011, Vidoll announced their disbandment due to musical differences and non-music professional interests. Their last concert was held on May 11, 2011.

=== Post Disband ===
Jui released a solo album "XI" (Elf) in 2011. In 2012, he joined with JUN from Phantasmagoria to form GOTCHAROCKA.

Gil joined the band Angelo in 2011. He has performed and released solo works as well.

Rame formed a new band with vocalist Ice, from XodiacK, called Black Gene For the Next Scene which disbanded in 2016.

Shun formally retired from the music scene.

Tero joined the group Trick (styled †яi¢к) as their drummer, and also provided support to Gotcharocka.

== Members ==
- Jui (ジュイ) – vocals
- Shun (シュン) – guitar
- Gil (ギル, Giru) – guitar
- Rame (ラメ) – bass guitar
- Tero (テロ) – drums

Former members

- Ayano – guitar (2002–2003)
- Yukine - guitar (left on June 26, 2005)
- Hide - guitar (2003–2005)

== Discography ==
=== Albums and EPs ===
- Face Pisaroto (July 21, 2002)
- Face Mayura (July 21, 2002)
- If...Yakubutsu Ranyou Bokumetsu Campaign (April 29, 2003)
- Bijinkei (July 29, 2004)
- Romanesque Gothic (September 11, 2004) Oricon Albums Weekly Ranking Position: 103
- Mukashi Natsukashi Ningyoushu Sono Ichi (December 15, 2004) Oricon Albums Weekly Ranking Position: 110
- Mukashi Natsukashi Ningyoushu Sono Ni (December 15, 2004) Oricon Albums Weekly Ranking Position: 115
- Mukashi Natsukashi Soushuuhen Omake Tsuki (June 8, 2005)
- Deathmate (January 1, 2006) Oricon Albums Weekly Ranking Position: 83
- V.I.D (November 22, 2006) Oricon Albums Weekly Ranking Position: 56
- Proposal -Sotsugyou Kokuhaku-(February 28, 2007) Oricon Albums Weekly Ranking Position: 84
- Bastard (November 21, 2007) Oricon Albums Weekly Ranking Position: 69 Oricon Independent Chart Ranking: 4
- Esoteric Romance (March 25, 2009) Oricon Albums Weekly Ranking Position: 44
- Monad (February 10, 2010) Oricon Albums Weekly Ranking Position: 44
- Best (January 19, 2011) Oricon Albums Weekly Ranking Position: 58

=== Singles ===
- Occult Proposal (December 12, 2002)
- If... Rebotomin (Y LV25 25) 475 mg (March 14, 2003) Oricon Singles Weekly Ranking Position: 85
- If... Torikabuto (Shikibetsu Code Nashi) 120 mg (March 14, 2003) Oricon Singles Weekly Ranking Position: 84
- Kana na no Chikai Mimi (April 26, 2003) Contained a band message and one live song
- Genjou Teki ni Kiken na Title no Tame Ima wa Dekimasen... (July 21, 2003)
- Ishoku Doumei (August 1, 2003) Calimero/Vidoll CD, each with one song and one cover.
- Boku, Shimobe (December 19, 2003)
- Hitokiri no Kurixxxxsu (December 12, 2003) Oricon Singles Weekly Ranking Position: 79
- Wagahai wa, Korosuke Nari... (1st Press March 10, 2004) (2nd Press September 29, 2004) Oricon Independent Chart Ranking: 4
- Kichigai TV (March 19, 2004)
- Giza-Giza Heart no Komoriuta (March 19, 2004)
- Boku, White Day mo Hitorikiri (March 29, 2004)
- Ningyo (June 30, 2004) Oricon Independent Chart Ranking: 3
- Hiiragi no Sou (December 25, 2004)
- Homo-Crash-Trap@ (December 29, 2004)
- Remind Story (April 22, 2005)
- Shutdown (September 28, 2005) Oricon Singles Weekly Ranking Position: 33
- Chocoripeyes (October 26, 2005) Oricon Singles Weekly Ranking Position: 33
- SinAI～右手のカッターと 左手のドラッグと薬指の深い愛と～ (May 24, 2006, 3 Types) Oricon Singles Weekly Ranking Position: 43
- Nectar (August 2, 2006)
- Junengo no Kyo Koko de . . . (March 28, 2007)
- Message Card (March 28, 2007)
- Innocent Teens (June 13, 2007) Oricon Singles Weekly Ranking Position: 39
- Cloud (July 18, 2007)
- Blue star (July 2, 2008) Oricon Singles Weekly Ranking Position: 21 Oricon Independent Chart Ranking: 2
- Maimu (December 10, 2008) Oricon Singles Weekly Ranking Position: 27
- Puzzle Ring (February 18, 2009) Oricon Singles Weekly Ranking Position: 33
- Focus (July 8, 2009) Oricon Singles Weekly Ranking Position: 22
- Eve (December 2, 2009) Oricon Singles Weekly Ranking Position: 30
- Crescent gazer (September 15, 2010)

=== DVDs ===
- Doll Mansion 209 Goushitsu (May 30, 2003)
- Shigatsu Nijuuroku Nichi, Hatsutaiken (October 1, 2003)
- Gyaku-Tsutsumotase (June 30, 2004)
- Ningyou Enzetsu-2004.9.11 Liquid Room Ebisu- (November 17, 2004)
- Ningyoukai PV (December 15, 2004)
- Bijinkakumei~Saishuu Yokokubi 1229~ (March 16, 2005)
- Daini me Zenkoku Ningyougeki -Rurou- FINAL «Rouman Kokuhaku» 2005.4.26 Nihon Seinenkan (April 26, 2005)
- 3°CStormTV-suna arashi housou-2006.8.29 SHIBUYA-AX(November 22, 2006)
- V.I.D seat for "Lastlovers" 2006.12.29 Shibuya Kokaido (February 28, 2007)
- [Flashback](February 28, 2007)
- Genei Bijin Kan - 2006.11.25 SHIBUYA O-EAST(August 29, 2007)
- ~The game of buster~ 2007.12.02 C.C.Lemon HALL(March 5, 2008)
- Relieve Your Blue Scar 2008.8.21 SHIBUYA-AX (December 10, 2008)
