= DuelJewel =

Japanese visual kei rock band

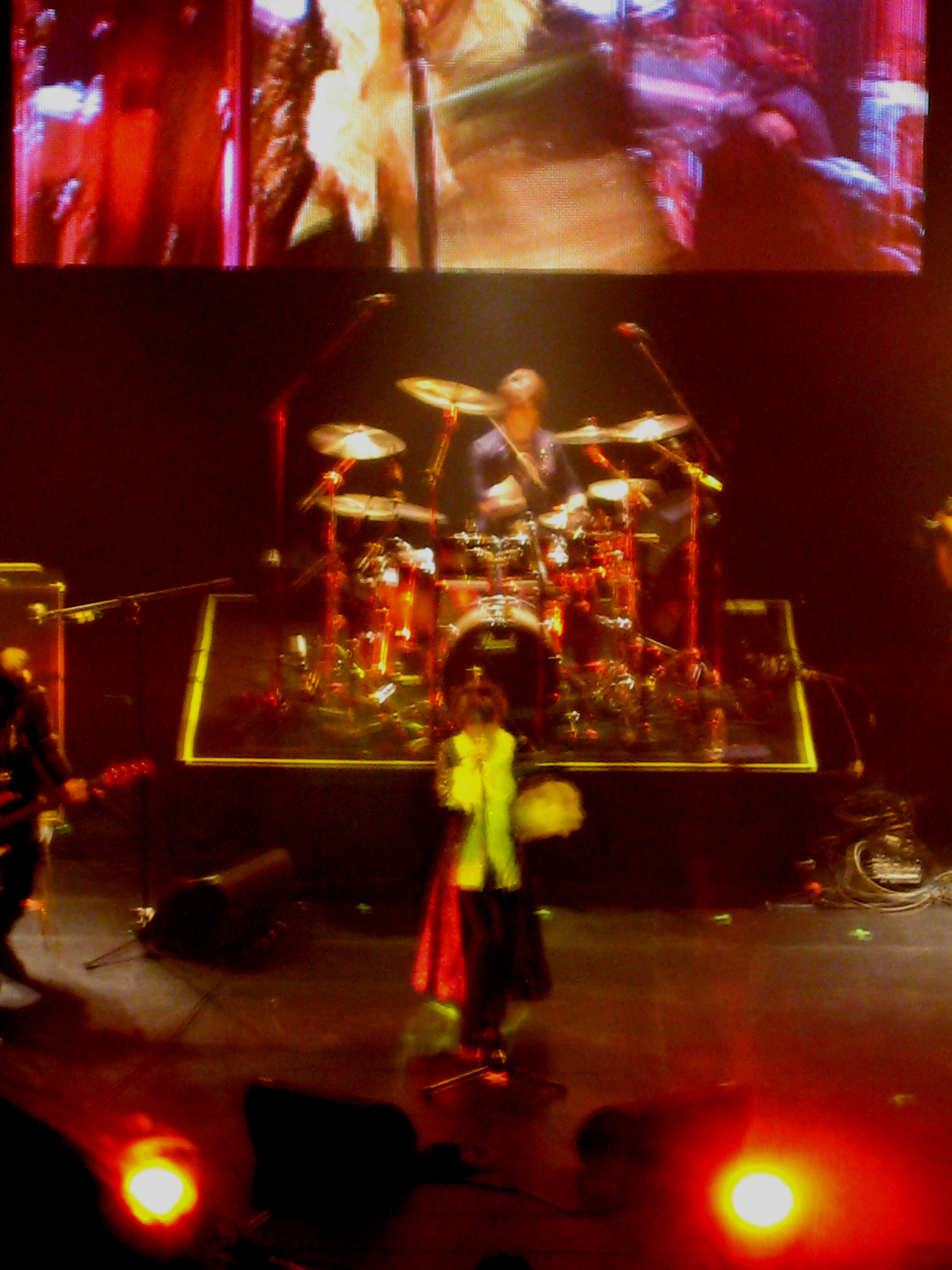

Background information
- Origin: Tokyo, Japan
- Genres: Alternative rock; hard rock
- Years active: 1997–2016, 2019-
- Labels: Cyber Force, Zero Range, Universal, Sword Records, DropC#, Maru Music (US), Gan-Shin (EU)
- Members: Hayato; Shun; Yuya; Natsuki; Val
- Past members: Psy; Takashi; Ka-non
- Website: dueljewel.jp

DuelJewel (デュエルジュエル) is a Japanese visual kei rock band formed in January 1997.

== History ==
DuelJewel began in 1997; during their early beginnings they released several demos. The vocalist Hayato joined in 1997, left, and returned in 1999. The band released their first album in 2001 and Natsuki joined in 2002 when Ka-non left the band. They performed at A-Kon (an anime convention) in Dallas, Texas in 2002, which was their first international concert. They returned to the United States, playing in Washington, D.C., Chicago, Anaheim, San Jose, and Houston through the rest of the year and into 2003.

The band continued to tour in Japan, gaining a larger fanbase, and in May 2007, the band performed at the sold-out two-day JRock Revolution concert held in Los Angeles, CA. On July 11, 2007, they released their first single on Universal, "Es."

They played in the V-Rock Festival alongside many other bands.

In 2010 DuelJewel became signed by Maru Music and Gan-Shin and released a USA and European exclusive album entitled "We Will Melt You" on September 17, 2010.

In 2016 DuelJewel disbanded citing issues that Hayato had been experiencing with regards to "functional dysphonia". However in late 2018 the band announced that, with Hayato having made a full recovery, they would perform at Zepp Tokyo on March 1, 2019. Since then, the band have made various appearances together on social media platforms such as Youtube.

== Profile ==
- Hayato (隼人) - vocals
- Shun - guitar, backup vocals
- Yuya (祐弥) - guitar
- Natsuki - bass
- Val (ばる) - drums
  - Val changed his stagename to Baru (ばる) in 2004. However, he still introduces himself as Val in English-speaking countries.

=== Past members ===
- Psy - bass (January 1997 - July 1998)
- Takashi - guitar (June 1997 - March 1999)
- ka-non - bass (January 1999 - December 2001)

== Name ==
When Shun and Val formed DuelJewel, they had narrowed the possibilities for name to two. Unable to choose between them, they combined them into DuelJewel. Fans have speculated on the meaning of the band's name, but in an interview with JaME in 2007, Val stated that there was none.

== Discography ==
Albums

- 2001: Lapidary
- 2002: Noah
- 2007: Bullet
- 2008: Glass Sphere (グラスフィア)
- 2010: Will
- 2011: Luminous
- 2014: Story
- 2015: Duel
- 2015: Jewel
- 2019: Zincite
- 2022: Trigger
- 2023: Flare
- 2024: Aria
- 2025: Eclipse

Compilations

- 2009: "Revive"
- 2010: "We Will Melt You"
  - Special edition, released only in Europe
- 2024: "[RE]REVIVE"

Omnibus

- 2000: "Stoning2"
- 2001: "Make an Epoch"
- 2001: "Make an Epoch 2"
- 2003: "Loop of Life III"
- 2004: "Hysteric Media Zone V"
- 2004: "Decadence 2004 ～Spleen & Ideal～"
- 2005: "Cannonball Vol.2"
- 2005: "Shock Edge 2005"
- 2011: "Crush! -90's V-Rock best hit cover songs-"

Demo Tapes

- 1998: "Kaze ～The Winding Garden～" (風～The Winding Garden～)
- 2000: "Kuro" (黒)
- 2000: "Shiro" (白)
- 2000: "Chinmoku" (沈黙)

Singles

- 2003: "Sepia"
- 2003: "Vermillion"
- 2004: "Nauthiz"
- 2005: "The Birth"
- 2006: "Azure"
- 2006: "Aishuu Melancholia/Life On..." (愛愁メランコリア)
- 2007: "Es"
- 2008: "Iolite" (アイオライト)
- 2011: "Vamp Ash"
- 2011: "Polaris"
- 2013: "It's just love"
- 2014: "Chronos"
- 2015: "Yuki no Asterisk" (雪のアスタリスク)

EP

- 2006: "Visions"
- 2010: "｢Zero｣"
- 2015: "Duel"
- 2015: "Jewel"

DVDs

- 2008: Jewelry Box
- 2011: Dear Lapidary
