= Misako Rocks! =

Japanese comics artist and writer

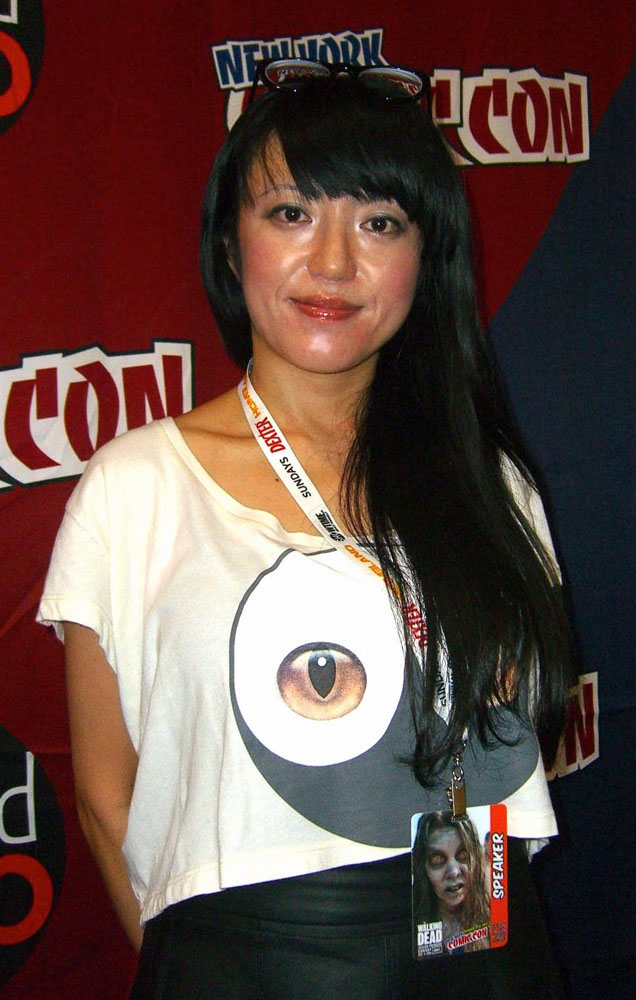
- MisakoRocks! at the 2012 New York Comic Con
- Born: Misako Takashima Japan
- Areas: Writer, Penciller, Inker
- Notable works: "Savage Love"

Misako Takashima (高嶋美沙子, known professionally as Misako Rocks!ミサコ・ロックス) is a Japanese comic strip artist and writer/illustrator of children's books, known for her illustrations in the column "Savage Love" and other features in The Onion, and for her appearance in the BBC documentary Story of Drawing. She has also published work in the United Kingdom manga anthology Manga Mover and has signed with Hyperion Books to publish manga in the United States.

According to art critic Andrew Graham Dixon, she is "an artist who follows many of the ancient visual and narrative traditions from which manga has evolved, but at the same time brings them into the modern world and gives them her own deeply personal interpretation." A shy child, she has said that she spent her childhood drawing, and hiding. "I just wanted to put my fantasy world on paper."

== Career ==
Misako Rocks! developed a love for comics and manga at an early age and drew her first comic at the age of 13. She moved to New York in 2001 and worked as a puppeteer, face painter, animal balloon maker, and art teacher while still developing her comics own work. Her entry into the industry came when The Onion decided to use her illustrations for their weekly "Savage Love" column.

Misako Rocks! was influenced by the work of Daniel Clowes, which she encountered while living in New York City. "I picked up a copy of Eightball and thought What's this! It's so good! Who did that! - his humor - so cynical, and so great." Like her character, Biker Girl, "she seems to embody the very spirit of manga, on the one hand she's introverted, full of the Japanese work ethic, but she's also got this manic wild child energy, which comes out after dark, when she puts away her sketchbook and jumps on stage in nightclubs."
