= 12012 =

Japanese visual kei rock band

- Also known as: Kyōki Shoji (凶器所持)
- Origin: Osaka, Japan
- Genres: Alternative metal; hard rock; pop rock; progressive metal; metalcore; nu metal; hardcore punk (early)
- Years active: 2003–2014, 2020 -
- Labels: Under Code Production, Universal Music Japan/Free-Will/Back Coat, Sony Music Japan/Free-Will/Firewall Div.
- Members: Wataru Miyawaki; Hiroaki Sakai; Shinichirou Saitou; Yūsuke Suga; Tomoyuki Enya; Tōru Kawauchi
- Website: http://12012.jp/

12012 (イチニーゼロイチニ, ichi nī zero ichi ni) is a Japanese visual kei rock band. Formed in 2003 in Osaka Prefecture, the group centers its work around the concept of "madness inside a human" (人間の内面における狂気 ningen no naimen ni okeru kyōki). 12012 is also the penal code for the possession of a dangerous weapon in California. The group sometimes performs as "Kyōki Shoji" (凶器所持), which is a translation of that offense.

== Musical styles ==
The band's musical style has changed over the years. Starting out as a hardcore punk band — and later an alternative metal band with some punk elements — after its first two albums Not Obtain+1 and Play Dolls the band's music shifted to a more radio-friendly sound which could be described as a mix of pop and hard rock. After guitarist Suga left, the band slowly drifted back to heavier terrain. The band's current style could be described as heavy metal with alternative and progressive rock influences.

== History ==
Official 12012 logo

In 2007, the band performed the ending theme, "Cyclone", to the Gonzo anime television series Romeo x Juliet, its single being released by Universal Music Japan on June 13, 2007. The group has also toured Japan on many occasions as well as performing at concerts in numerous international locations.

In September 2007, vocalist Miyawaki Wataru was arrested for assault on a woman. After a night of heavy drinking, it was reported he had tried to strangle a female acquaintance. It was resolved out of court, and the charges were later dropped. On October 17, 2007, Wataru posted an apology in his blog.

It was announced on their official website that guitarist Yūsuke Suga would be leaving the band on December 12, 2010, after the final concert of their "The Fangs of Killer「Seven」Sadness" tour. The band continued with the four remaining members.

In 2013, former support guitarist Shinichirou Saitou officially joined the band, and the year saw the release of two mini-albums: Deicida of Silence and The Swan. On February 10, 2014, the band announced an indefinite hiatus which would take place the same year on December 12. Later that year they also announced a mini-album XII, which would be their last release before the indefinite hiatus.

On June 24, 2020, a livestream was played by Sakai where he announced 12012 would return from hiatus. The new lineup will also include former guitarist Yūsuke Suga, making the band a six-piece.

== Members ==
- Wataru Miyawaki (宮脇 渉 Miyawaki Wataru) – vocals (2003–2014, 2020–present)
- Hiroaki Sakai (酒井 洋明 Sakai Hiroaki) – lead guitar (2003–2014, 2020–present)
- Shinichirou Saitou (齋藤紳一郎 Saitou Shinichirou) – rhythm guitar (2013–2014), lead guitar (2020–present)
- Yūsuke Suga (須賀 勇介 Suga Yūsuke) – rhythm guitar (2003–2010, 2020–present)
- Tomoyuki Enya (塩谷 朋之 Enya Tomoyuki) – bass (2003–2014, 2020–present)
- Tōru Kawauchi (川内 亨 Kawauchi Tōru) – drums (2003–2014, 2020–present)

== Discography ==
=== Studio albums ===
- Not Obtain+1 (February 1, 2006) 111
- Play Dolls (February 1, 2006) 62
- Diamond (December 12, 2007) 70
- Mar Maroon (March 11, 2009) 50
- Seven (July 14, 2010) 48
- 12012 (March 14, 2012)

=== Compilation albums ===
- Pupa (December 11, 2013)
- Larva (December 11, 2013)

=== EPs ===
- Increasingly (April 28, 2004)
  - Increasingly -Kanzen Ban- (Increasingly-完全盤-, June 15, 2005) 128
- Bell Salem (ベルサレム, October 6, 2004) Oricon Weekly Album Position: 189
- Knight Mare (November 3, 2004) 166
- Shin -Deep- (深～Deep～, December, 2004) 179
- Doku (June 1, 2005)
- Deicida of Silence (April 24, 2013)
- The Swan (September 11, 2013)
- XII (October 1, 2014)

=== Singles ===
- "Depression Sign" (July 23, 2003)
- "Shudder" (March 31, 2004)
- "Shuu" (襲, December 12, 2004)
- "Hitori" (独, February 11, 2005)
- "Swallow" (March 16, 2005) Oricon Weekly Single Position: 69
- "Sick" (March 16, 2005) 71
- "Depression Sign -Kanzen Ban-" (Depression Sign -完全盤-, June 15, 2005) 105
- "Shudder -Kanzen Ban-" (|Shudder -完全盤-, June 15, 2005) 101
- "Icy -Cold City-" (12 December 2005)
- "Orion" (February 17, 2006)
- "Heart" (May 10, 2006) 86
- "Pistol" (September 20, 2006) 90
- "Wana" (罠, October 18, 2006) 58
- "Over..." (November 15, 2006) 66
- "Cyclone" (サイクロン, June 13, 2007) 20
- "Shine" (October 17, 2007) 23
- "Merry Go World" (April 16, 2008) 20
- "Taiyou" (太陽, August 20, 2008) 28
- "Aitai Kara...." (逢いたいから...., October 29, 2008) 33
- "As" (January 21, 2009) 29
- "Hallelujah" (February 18, 2009) 37
- "Usubeni to Ame"(薄紅と雨, October 7, 2009)
- "Tattoo" (February 24, 2010) 38
- "The Pain of Catastrophe" (May 26, 2010) 49

=== Video ===
- Heart: the Clip (May 31, 2006)
- Just The Way You Are

=== DVD ===
- Crom (April 20, 2005)
- Created Movie 1 ~Kakuu Toshi Taihai Byōsha~ (CREATED MOVIE1～架空都市退廃描写～, July 27, 2005)
- Macrograph (September 28, 2005)
- Shock Wave CD the Select [Limited Release] (2005/10/26)
- Hide & Seek ~Tour 2006~ (August 30, 2006)
- Jappanesque Rock Collectionz Cure DVD 02 (October 25, 2006)
- Created Movie 2 - modern films (December 13, 2006)
- Bands Shock DVD Vol.2 (December 24, 2006)
- XII Party (February 21, 2007)
- Chikasen Shingen Nagashima Kichi (March 28, 2007)
- Shinki – Graduation & Deperture 2007.2.14 Shibuya Kokaido (May 30, 2007)
- 5th Anniversary Special Live Arashi (5th Anniversary Special Live 「嵐」, September 24, 2008)
- Extra-territorial 2010.05.05 at Shibuya-AX (August 25, 2010)
- Muhouchitai「無法地帯」, March 31, 2010)

=== Various Artist compilation ===
- Crush! -90's V-Rock Best hit Cover Songs- (January 26, 2011, cover of Glay's "Winter, Again")

=== Books ===
- Croon After the Bed (January 25, 2006)
- Deracine (May 25, 2006)
- Garnet Star (May 25, 2006)
- Shoxx Tokubetsu Henshu – Over the Edge 2008 Edition.1 (February 2009)
- Eztra-Territorial 2010 Official Book(June 2010)
