= Kisaki =

Japanese musician and record producer (born 1976)

- Born: Tadashi Matsuura; March 10, 1976 (age 50); Kainan, Wakayama, Japan
- Genres: Gothic rock; alternative rock; progressive rock; glam punk
- Occupations: Musician; record producer; composer
- Instruments: Bass; keyboards
- Years active: 1993–present
- Labels: Matina; Under Code Production
- Formerly of: Phantasmagoria; Anti Feminism
- Website: kisaki-official.jp

Tadashi Matsuura (Japanese: 松浦忠史; born March 10, 1976), known exclusively by his stage name Kisaki (きさき), is a Japanese musician, record producer and businessman, whose career in the visual kei scene spans more than 30 years. He is best known for having been the bassist of several bands, including La:Sadie's, Mirage, Syndrome, Kisaki Project, and Phantasmagoria. When Phantasmagoria disbanded in 2007, Kisaki announced his retirement as an active musician. However, in 2010, he ended his retirement and formed the band Lin -The End of Corruption World-.

Kisaki also works as a record producer, including for his two former visual kei record labels, Matina and Under Code Production. These labels launched the careers of many bands, including Vidoll, The Gazette and 12012. In 2023, Matenrou Opera vocalist Sono stated that the visual kei scene would not be what it is today without Kisaki.

== Early life ==
Kisaki is from Kainan, Wakayama. As a child, he actively played soccer and went fishing. He first touched an instrument at the end of middle school, when a friend who started to play the drums invited him to play bass. "It wasn't about playing in a band; it was just playing for fun.", "I simply wanted to make loud noise (laughs)." Although he grew fond of music through the Hideaki Tokunaga songs that his mother listened to, he was not thinking about entering the music industry. But that changed when he saw X Japan; "Their look combined both rebelliousness and beauty, and they were great musicians with cool songs". When his parents bought him a bass guitar in his first year of high school, that is when Kisaki started to practice seriously and quickly formed his first band. Inspired by the appearances of X Japan members Yoshiki and Hide, he grew his hair out and began wearing makeup as a visual kei artist. Kisaki would continue to do his own makeup until partway through Phantasmagoria's career.

Kisaki has credited the manager of a local Wakayama live house for his music career. Before his band Levia (formed in 1993), even had their first performance, comments from this manager resulted in them writing their own original material that was distributed as a demo. The band then played at the venue about once a month, and, after being covered on the local news, ended up opening for Pink Sapphire in front of 1,000 people. Kisaki said that this early success caused him to be content and disregard the idea of going to college. However, his bandmates were, and the group disbanded on the day of their high school graduation as Kisaki wanted to expand into Osaka.

== Career ==
=== 1995–2002: La:Sadie's, Mirage and Syndrome ===
Promising his parents that he would find a normal job if he did not have success by the age of 25, Kisaki moved to Osaka alone and joined and left various bands. These included Laybial and Shëy≠dë (pronounced "shade"), which he said did not last long because they were simply a way to get on stage. He remarked that Garden had some success finding an audience, but Stella Maria, which he was invited to join in 1994, had even more. Although he was not the band's leader, he was tasked with promotion and began to take on the role. Kyo, vocalist of a band that Stella Maria played opposite, impressed Kisaki to the point that he desired to form a band with the singer. The bassist explained that he and Kyo went to a lot of concerts in order to carefully scout who they wanted to recruit. The two formed La:Sadie's together in 1996, with Kisaki later describing them as having been "the ideal band". However, despite having what he considered great live performances, Kisaki was told to leave the band after only a year. The four other members of La:Sadie's went on to form Dir En Grey. Kisaki later opined that he had failed to take care of them, "I thought doing lots of good live shows would please the members, but I was wrong. By not giving them time to rest and deciding on recording schedules in between, I must have put a lot of stress and burden on them."

But Kisaki quickly rebounded and began a nationwide tour with his new band Mirage just two months later. They gave out 5,000 copies of the demo "Hyakka Ryoran" for free at their concerts. They had a song used as the ending theme of the television show Break Out. Although Mirage received an offer to sign to Warner Music Japan, Kisaki felt it was too soon and also wanted to follow in the footsteps of Yoshiki by creating his own record label in 1997, Matina. Vocalist Tomo left in summer 1998, and was replaced by Akira. Mirage disbanded in January 2000, but Kisaki already had his next band ready, and Syndrome formed that same month. Guitarist Ken left in 2001 and formed Merry. Syndrome released the mini-album Core in April 2002. However, the band suddenly announced their disbandment, and had their last live on November 18, 2002. Vocalist Asagi and guitarists Sin and Ruiza formed D together, while drummer Shion formed Tinc. With Matina becoming successful, Kisaki explained that the increased workload is what led to all his bands being short-lived, "There was a growing gap between me and the members." The bassist later explained that he was disheartened by his inability to maintain long-lasting bands and questioned his aptitude as a leader, so he decided to start from scratch. He was also hospitalized at this point, but the members of Vidoll expressed a strong desire to work with Kisaki, which led to him forming the label Under Code Production. Vidoll quickly gained popularity, and former members of Matina came to Kisaki and Under Code for guidance with their new bands.

=== 2002–2010: Kisaki Project and Phantasmagoria ===
With a desire to still perform, Kisaki formed Kisaki Project (also written as Kisaki Solo Project) with Vidoll vocalist Jui. The band was initially put together to contribute to an omnibus album in 2002, but there were many requests for them to perform so they began irregular activities the following year. The group's lineup often changes, with the bassist himself being the only permanent member. Kisaki writes and composes all of the band's songs, which consist primarily of soft rock and pop ballads. When fronted by Jui, it is credited as Kisaki Project feat. Jui (KISAKI PROJECT feat.樹威). In 2004, they traveled to Europe and released an album there. Also in 2003, Kisaki formed the side project Kisaki & Kansai Kizoku (妃&関西貴族) with Vidoll bassist Rame on vocals.

Around this same time, guitarist Jun approached Kisaki to start a band together, Phantasmagoria. It was announced to be Kisaki's final band, which the bassist said was to show how committed he was to it. Phantasmagoria included CDs in issues of Shoxx magazine and quickly rose to become one of the top three acts on Under Code. They paid close attention to concepts and costumes; Kisaki said the release of the 2006 trilogy – "Kousou Kyoku", "Kyousou Kyoku", and "Gensou Kyoku" – was a turning point for the band. "We spent a lot of time discussing and creating these songs, which had their own color and depth. We paid great attention to the music videos too, as we didn't want to just perform live but also create something that would endure over time. We aimed to make each song stand out, not just as part of an album, but as something people would want to listen to individually." However, Kisaki was arrested that year and convicted for tax evasion. The plans for Under Code Production bands Vidoll, Phantasmagoria, and 12012 to sign to major record labels were scrapped as a result. After receiving a suspended sentence and consulting a lawyer, Kisaki decided to stop performing and focus on running the label. Before disbanding in 2007, Phantasmagoria went on a final tour; "We toured the nation, including the first live music club I played in my hometown, the Wakayama Prefectural Cultural Hall where I first saw Tokunaga Hideaki, and finally at the Osaka International Exchange Center, our base of operations. By having a disbandment live, Phantasmagoria became a legendary phantom band." Kisaki retired from performing to concentrate on managing Under Code Production, he studied management and produced various bands. Although, Phantasmagoria did reunite for special shows in the following few years.

=== 2010–present: Lin ===
On February 1, 2010, Kisaki announced that he was planning to end his retirement and form a new band. This was around the time his probation period ended. This band was revealed to be Lin -The End of Corruption World- (凛 -the end of corruption world-). Kisaki explained that the group came from having noticed that no new bands were emerging, "Bands that should have been able to reach greater heights weren't getting the expected response, and the scene was changing. I felt that I couldn't guide bands unless I immersed myself back in the scene." In 2011, the bassist's solo project briefly returned under the name Kisaki Project feat. Satsuki (KISAKI PROJECT feat.砂月), after recruiting former Rentrer en Soi vocalist Satsuki. This lineup released two singles, "Shouei" and "Sou ~Twinkle Vitality~", and a mini-album, Kaishi ~An Ideal of Beauty Desperate~.

In 2013, the "first chapter" of Lin ended. Every member changed, except for Kisaki, and the second chapter of the band started as an independent act. Feeling no need to stay in Osaka anymore, Kisaki moved to Tokyo, but struggled. They participated in a tribute album for Kuroyume and played a festival in Taiwan to an audience of 8,000 people, but it was far from his ideal. "The band wasn't bad, but I disbanded it when I turned 40 in 2016, for the sake of my future life." Shortly after, Kisaki began receiving offers for session bands and Kisaki Project shows. He also wrote songs for pop idols, including Hikari Shiina, and realized he enjoys occasionally being in the spotlight while providing music for others. In 2018, Mirage temporarily reunited for their 20th anniversary. In 2020, Kisaki organized and produced the omnibus album Rock-May-Kan Densetsu (鹿鳴館伝説) to celebrate the 40th anniversary of Rock-May-Kan, a Meguro, Tokyo live house that was important to the 1990s visual kei scene. Featuring 50 different bands from the era, all proceeds from the 4-disc album went to the music venue at a time when concerts were prohibited during the COVID-19 pandemic in Japan. While working with Akira on a separate project, Kisaki and the vocalist realized that Mirage's 25th anniversary was coming up in 2022, and decided to create the band's first full-length album for the occasion. After reuniting with Yayoi, they recruited Jils guitarist Shun and Zo:diaek drummer Yomi as official members of the third generation of Mirage halfway through recording it. Biograph includes both new material and re-recordings of old songs, and was released on April 20, 2022. They also had original vocalist Tomo, who had since retired from music, participate on two songs.

In 2023, Kisaki decided to release 30 songs, on three albums, over the span of three months (April, May, and June) to commemorate the 30th anniversary of his career in music. Among the numerous guest musicians, Providence features Defspiral vocalist Taka and Versailles guitarist Hizaki, Afterglow features Nogod's Dancho and Galneryus's Syu, and Preuve d'etre features Psycho le Cému vocalist Daishi and Mary's Blood guitarist Saki. On October 8, Kisaki Project had their first performance with Jui in 16 years at Umeda Trad as part of The Grand Paradox event. The mini-album Eternally and the single "Hakai" ended Kisaki's anniversary celebrations in December. The mini-album is composed of five songs that he could not fit on the trilogy and features Matenrou Opera vocalist Sono and Deathgaze vocalist Ai, while the single was excluded from Eternally because it has a completely different style.

To commemorate his 50th birthday, Kisaki released the album Voice in Sadness on March 10, 2026. It is composed of seven remixes, two re-recordings and three new songs. He also held the Beyond the Kingdom -Fest of Excellence- event at Big Cat in Osaka on March 15. In addition to Psycho le Cému, Nogod, Matenrou Opera, Sex Machineguns, Gotcharocka, Fest Vainqueur, Hikari Shiina and Little Lilith, the festival also featured a one-night only band called The Locus, which was composed of Kisaki, Sono, Hizaki, Cero of Jupiter and Hiroki of D.

== Record labels ==
=== Matina ===
Matina was an independent record label that managed visual kei artists. It was formed in January 1997 by Kisaki as Matina Soleil, the Osaka branch of the larger visual kei label Soleil, which was founded the previous year by former Rouage bassist Kaiki. Kisaki was inspired to start his own label like Yoshiki had done with Extasy Records. Without knowing how to do anything, he rented a "run-down" apartment and installed a telephone line and fax machine. He personally answered phone calls, told customers the live schedules, and handled the mail-order sales of demo tapes. With only two bands at the time, Mirage and Madeth Gray'll, Kisaki described the early years as "more like a club than a company". But these two bands gradually gained popularity and Matina expanded rapidly, and was soon managing about five acts. Michiru, musician and founder of the Tokyo-based Loop Ash Records, later said he and Kisaki wanted to do for visual kei what Extasy and Free-Will had done for the previous generation of the movement. Matina became independent from Soleil in 1999, and eventually formed its own sub-labels (Eternal, its Kantō region branch, and Storm, its Hokkaido branch). Kisaki said Matina became exactly what he envisioned it would, holding events gathering all the labelmates on significant occasions such as Christmas and New Year's Eve, just like the Extasy Summits. "But it grew too big, and I realized I needed to manage the label seriously. I was only about 20 years old at the time." It featured a large number of bands, most of whom had few releases and were short lived. After its fifth anniversary, Matina closed in 2002. To commemorate the 20th anniversary of Matina, two omnibus albums collecting and remastering demos by bands from the label, Prelude ~Anthology of Brilliance Vol: I~ and Prelude ~Anthology of Brilliance Vol: II~, were released on November 16, 2022.

=== Under Code Production ===
Under Code Production was Kisaki's second independent visual kei label, and a sub-label of Free-Will. It was formed in 2003 in the Kansai region. While hospitalized shortly after Matina's demise, Kisaki said the members of Vidoll would visit him weekly to express a strong desire to work with him, which led to Kisaki forming Under Code Production. After Vidoll quickly gained popularity, former members of Matina also came to Kisaki for guidance with their new bands. The label wanted each band to express its individuality while maintaining an identifiable style for the Under Code label as a whole. Thus, Kisaki conducted thorough meetings with all the bands, "Having once dissolved a label, I prioritized the opinions of the members in all our decisions."

Although its focus was visual kei bands, Under Code Production also produced several non-visual artists, including Anti-Kranke, Cious pi Cious, and Oto-oni. The label also established sub-labels: Road Awake, for hardcore bands Harvest and Vagerke, and Haunted House Records, a sub-label created exclusively for the band Flesh for Flankenstein. Just as Under Code Production bands Vidoll, Phantasmagoria, and 12012 were to scheduled to sign to major record labels, Kisaki's 2006 arrest resulted in these plans being scrapped.

On August 31, 2013, Under Code officially closed. Kisaki cited the frequency of members leaving and bands disbanding as the reason, "Three years of building something, and then with two members leaving, it's back to the start. Watching these bands, I began to feel a conflict 'perhaps I was just rehashing the same approach'. Continuing like those things would not be good for me or the bands, so I decided to end Under Code Production. It was its 10th year, and I wanted to end on a high note rather than let it decline." As a result, many bands signed to the label split up, such as Nega, Megaromania, Dali, Vior Gloire. A handful of other acts remained active, such as Futurism Boyz, Lin, and Realies. Several musicians related to Under Code formed their own labels, such as Goeman Records formed by Realies' frontman Rayka, and King Zebra formed by Suzaku's vocalist Itsuki.

== Discography ==
=== With Kisaki Project ===
==== Albums ====
List of albums for Kisaki Project
Title	Album details
Shōzō: in the Cradle (肖像~in the cradle~)	Released: April 28, 2004; Label: Under Code Production, Mabell; Format: CD; Note: Released in Japan and Europe
Final Confession	Released: October 31, 2004; Label: Spec (Shoxx), Under Code Production; Format: CD + DVD
Kasō (枯想)	Released: January 10, 2007; Label: Under Code Production; Format: CD + DVD
Eien no Yume... (永遠の夢・・・)	Released: August 15, 2007; Label: Under Code Production; Format: CD, Digital (iTunes)
The Solitude Songs	Released: July 23, 2008; Label: World Temptation Entertainment; Format: CD + DVD
Eien no Yume: for Lovers... (永遠の夢 ~for Lovers・・・~)	Released: December 24, 2008; Label: Under Code Production; Format: CD + DVD
Kowashi ~an ideal of beauty Desperate~ (壊 詞 ~an ideal of beauty Desperate~)	Released: October 31, 2012; Label: Under Code Production; Format: CD + DVD

==== Singles ====
List of singles for Kisaki Project
Title	Album details
Kioku: After Confession (記 憶 ~after confession~)	Released: December 25, 2003; Label: Under Code Production; Format: CD
Michishirube: Color of Labyrinth (道 標 ~Color of Labyrinth~)	Released: March 28, 2004; Label: Under Code Production; Format: CD
Sunadokei: Never Ending Memories (砂時計 ~Never ending memories~)	Released: August 25, 2004; Label: Under Code Production; Format: CD
Shinki (深 絆)	Released: February 14, 2007; Label: Under Code Production; Format: CD
Byōshafū (描写風)	Released: June 20, 2007; Label: Under Code Production; Format: CD + DVD
Fragments Voice	Released: August 28, 2007; Label: Under Code Production; Format: CD
Memory of Tears: Bōkyaku no Rakuyō ni Utsuru Jōkei (Memory of Tears ~忘却の落陽に映る情景~)	Released: October 31, 2007; Label: Under Code Production; Format: CD
Solitude Songs	Released: July 31, 2008; Label: Under Code Production; Format: CD, Digital (iTunes)
Shouei (消影)	Released: November 11, 2011; Label: Under Code Production; Format: CD, Digital (iTunes)
「Kagen」 ~DEMO VERSION~ (「華 眩」 ~DEMO VERSION~)	Released: November 27, 2011; Label: Under Code Production; Format: CD (Live distributed, limit of 300 copies)
Sou ~Twinkle Vitality~ (想 ~Twinkle Vitality~)	Released: February 15, 2012; Label: Under Code Production; Format: CD + DVD, Digital (iTunes)

==== Videos ====
List of video releases for Kisaki Project
Title	Album details
Hakumei: Kimi no Inai Sekai (「薄明~君のいない世界~」)	Released: November 25, 2003; Label: Under Code Production; Format: DVD
Kodō: Screaming of Mind (鼓動 ~Screaming of mind~)	Released: July 28, 2004; Label: Under Code Production; Format: DVD
Impressive Sight	Released: October 31, 2004; Label: Under Code Production; Format: DVD
Silent -Niji no Kiseki- (Silent -虹の軌跡-)	Released: December 26, 2006; Label: Spec (Shoxx), Under Code Production; Format: DVD
For Lovers...	Released: August 15, 2007; Label: Under Code Production; Format: DVD

=== With Kisaki & Kansai Kizoku ===
==== Albums ====
List of albums for Kisaki & Kansai Kizoku
Title	Album details
Hysteric Dance -Daiisshou- (Hysteric Dance -第一章-)	Released: August 20, 2003; Label: Under Code Production; Format: CD
Burst Songs	1st Release: July 21, 2004; 2nd Release: July 27, 2004; 3rd Release: December 2, 2009; Label: Kapparecords, Under Code Production; Format: CD

==== Singles ====
List of singles for Kisaki & Kansai Kizoku
Title	Album details
Kainushi wa Boku (飼い主は犬?)	Released: October 8, 2004; Label: Under Code Production; Format: CD
Black Milky	Released: October 31, 2004; Label: Under Code Production; Format: CD + DVD

==== Videos ====
List of video releases for Kisaki & Kansai Kizoku
Title	Album details
2006.10.04 Holiday Osaka 「Junichi Matsuri」 (2006.10.04 Holiday Osaka 「順壱祭」)	Released: February 26, 2010; Label: Under Code Production; Format: DVD
2006.10.31 Harajuku Ruido 「Halloween Night Live and Visual Cos. Party」 (2006.10.31 原宿Ruido 「Halloween Night Live & Visual Cos. Party」)	Released: February 26, 2010; Label: Under Code Production; Format: DVD
