= List of visual kei musical groups =

This is a list of visual kei musical groups. This list does not include individual solo musicians.

== !-9 ==
- 12012
- 9Goats Black Out

== A ==
- Acid Black Cherry
- Acme
- Aikaryu
- Aion
- Alice Nine
- Aliene Ma'riage
- An Cafe
- Angelo
- Anti Feminism
- Arlequin
- Ayabie

== B ==
- Baiser
- Baroque
- BIS
- Blam Honey
- Blood
- Buck-Tick
- By-Sexual
- Breakerz

== C ==
- Cali Gari
- The Candy Spooky Theater
- Cascade
- Charlotte
- Codomo Dragon
- Color
- Core the Child
- Creature Creature

== D ==
- D
- D'erlanger
- D'espairsRay
- D=Out
- Dacco
- Daizystripper
- Dead End
- The Dead Pop Stars
- Deadman
- Deathgaze
- Defspiral
- Deluhi
- Der Zibet
- Devil Kitty
- Deviloof
- Dezert
- Diaura
- Dimlim
- Disacode
- Die in Cries
- Dio – Distraught Overlord
- Dir en grey
- Dolly
- Doremidan
- Dué le Quartz
- DuelJewel

== E ==
- Eight
- Exist Trace

== F ==
- Fanatic Crisis

== G ==
- The Gazette
- Genkaku Allergy
- Ghost
- Girugamesh
- Glacier
- Glay
- Golden Bomber
- Guniw Tools

== H ==
- Heidi.
- hide with Spread Beaver
- Himitsu Kessha Kodomo A
- Hizaki Grace Project
- Hybrid-Zombiez

== I ==
- Inugami Circus-dan
- Izabel Varosa

== J ==
- Janne Da Arc
- Jealkb
- Jiluka
- Jupiter

== K ==
- Kagerou
- Kagrra,
- Kamaitachi
- Kannivalism
- Karma Shenjing
- The Kiddie
- Kiryū
- Kizu
- Kneuklid Romance
- Kra
- Kuroyume

== L ==
- L'Arc-en-Ciel
- La'cryma Christi
- La'Mule
- Laputa
- Lareine
- LM.C
- Luis-Mary
- Luna Sea
- Lycaon
- Lynch.

== M ==
- Malice Mizer
- Madeth Gray'll
- Matenrou Opera
- Megamasso
- Mejibray
- Merry
- Mix Speaker's,Inc.
- Moi dix Mois
- Mucc

== N ==
- Nightmare
- Nocturnal Bloodlust
- Nogod

== P ==
- Panic Channel
- Penicillin
- Pentagon
- Phantasmagoria
- The Piass
- Pierrot
- Plastic Tree
- Psycho le Cému

== R ==
- Raphael
- Rentrer en Soi
- Rice
- The Riotts.
- Roselia
- Rouage
- Royz

== S ==
- S.K.I.N.
- Sadie
- Sads
- Schaft
- Schwarz Stein
- Screw
- Sex-Android
- Shazna
- Shintenchi Kaibyaku Shudan: Zigzag
- Siam Shade
- Sid
- Sophia
- Spiv States
- Strawberry Song Orchestra
- Sug
- Sukekiyo

== T ==
- Tinc

== U ==
- UchuSentai:Noiz
- The Underneath
- Unsraw

== V ==
- Velvet Eden
- Versailles
- Vidoll
- Vistlip
- Vivid

== W ==
- Wyse

== X ==
- Xaa-Xaa
- Xanvala
- X Japan
- XTripx

== Z ==
- Zi:Kill
- Zoro
