= Jiluka =

Japanese metal band

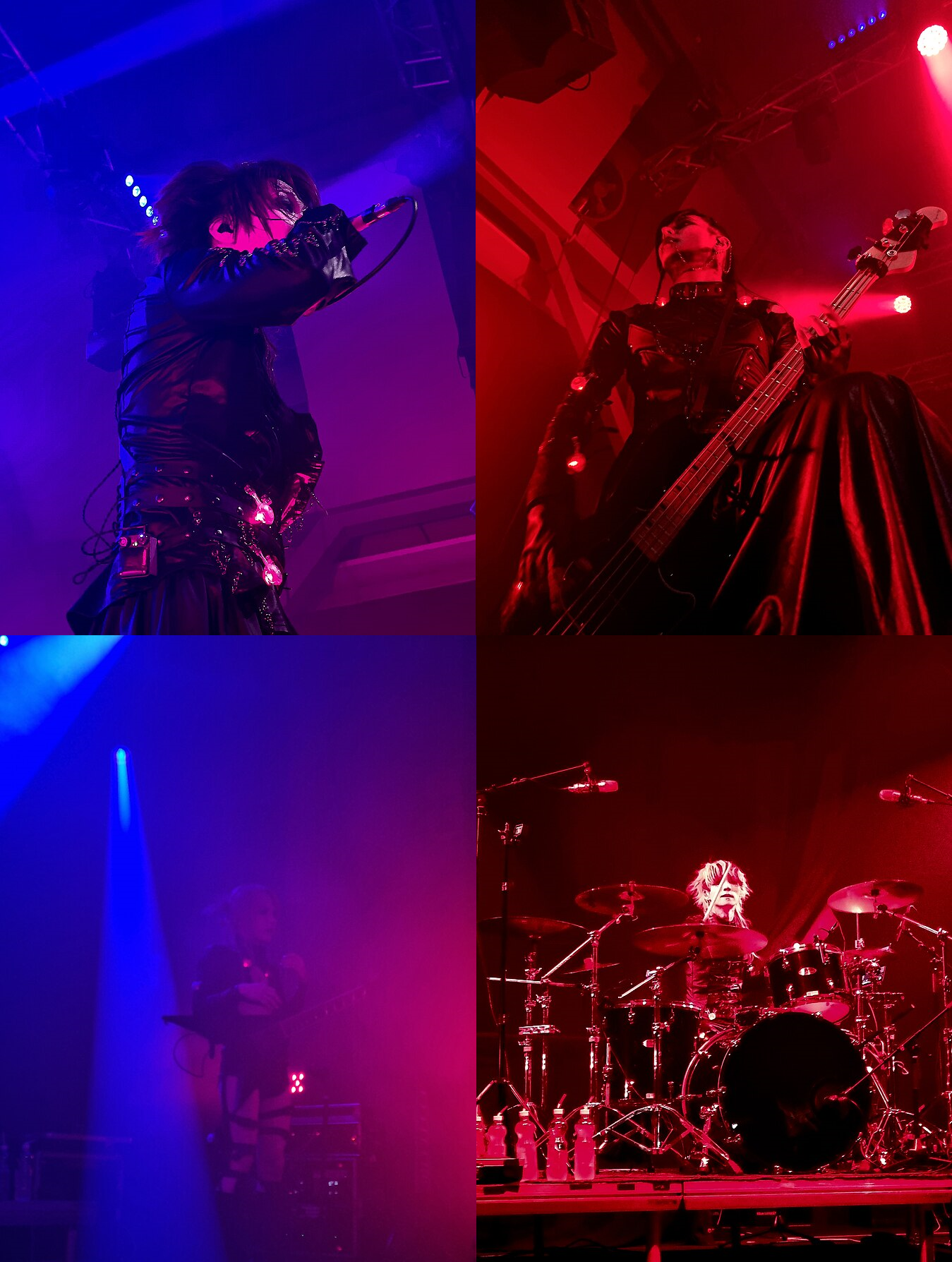
- Jiluka in Helsinki in September 4, 2024.

Background information
- Origin: Japan
- Genres: Avant-garde metal; djent; progressive metalcore; electronicore
- Years active: 2013, 2015–present
- Labels: DPR Japan (2015-2024); Faizh Music (2024-present)
- Members: Ricko; Sena; Boogie; Zyean
- Past members: JaiL
- Website: https://jiluka-web.com/

Jiluka (Japanese: ジルカ, Hepburn: Jiruka; stylized as JILUKA) is a Japanese visual kei metal band initially formed in May 2013 but restarted in February 2015. The group are an independent band under their own label, Faizh Music, consisting of members Ricko, Sena, the composer/songwriter, Boogie and Zyean. They have released 8 albums (1 studio album, 6 mini-albums and 1 greatest hits) and 12 singles so far. Jiluka were titled as "Modern metal visual kei (V系モダン・メタル, V-kei modan metaru)", but later changed to "Electro Gothic Metal (EGM)".

They were ranked at the 12 position on the JRock News's top 15 visual kei and Japanese rock artists of 2019, third as of 2021 and second in 2024, only behind The Gazette.

== Career ==
=== 2013–2016: Early years ===
Jiluka was originally formed in February 2013 by Ricko, Sena, Boogie and JaiL, debuting on May 6, 2013. However, JaiL announced in June that he would leave the band after a final show on December 21, 2013, causing a break in the group activities. The band restarted in 2015 with a new drummer, Zyean, releasing their debut single "Screamer" and then, on April 8, the EP Brave Agonistic Letters Under Segregation. The second single, "Lluvia", was released on November 11. On April 20, 2016, they released the third single "Faizh" and performed their first solo concert on May 21 in Ikebukuro.

=== 2017–2020: First studio album and Mad Pit Tours ===
In 2017 they released their third EP, titled Xenomorphic, on June 28. The limited single "Hellraiser" was released for exclusive purchase at the May 20, 2018, concert at Tsutaya-O West. Metamorphose, the band's first full-length album, was released on September 12, 2018, and reached number eight on the Oricon Indies Albums charts. On December 16, the group performed in Metal Square vol. 4 festival in Shibuya, with other bands like Dimlim, Nocturnal Bloodlust and Deviloof.

In 2019, they sponsored the Mad Pit Tour 2019 and embarked on it with other bands such as Deviloof, Dexcore and Victim of Deception. On May 29, they released a cover album titled Polyhedron, containing covers of songs by Do As Infinity, Joe Yellow, Hatsune Miku, among others. Jiluka participated in a collaboration with the band breakin' holiday and on August 3, the two groups performed together and released an album titled B'H⇄JLK, in which Juri, lead singer of breakin' holiday, sings Jiluka's "Twisted Pain" and Ricko sings "Lilith" by breakin' holiday. The disc was limited to purchase on the day of the show. On November 13, the greatest hits album Xanadu was released along with a new version of the music video for "Screamer" from the debut EP Brave Agonistic Letters Under Segregation. The album also included a new song, "Elice in Slow Motion".

In February 2020, they performed at Tsutaya-O West, celebrating the band's 5-year career. From June to July, they would sponsor the Mad Pit Tour 2020, however it was completely canceled due to the COVID-19 pandemic. On October 3 they embarked on another national tour, but this time with limited audience due to the pandemic, which ended on November 29 in Shibuya. This tour was promoting the new EP, Xtopia, released on October 14. From August 30 to September 12, 2020, they embarked on tour together with Leetspeak Monsters.

=== 2021–present: Idola and world tour K4RMA ===
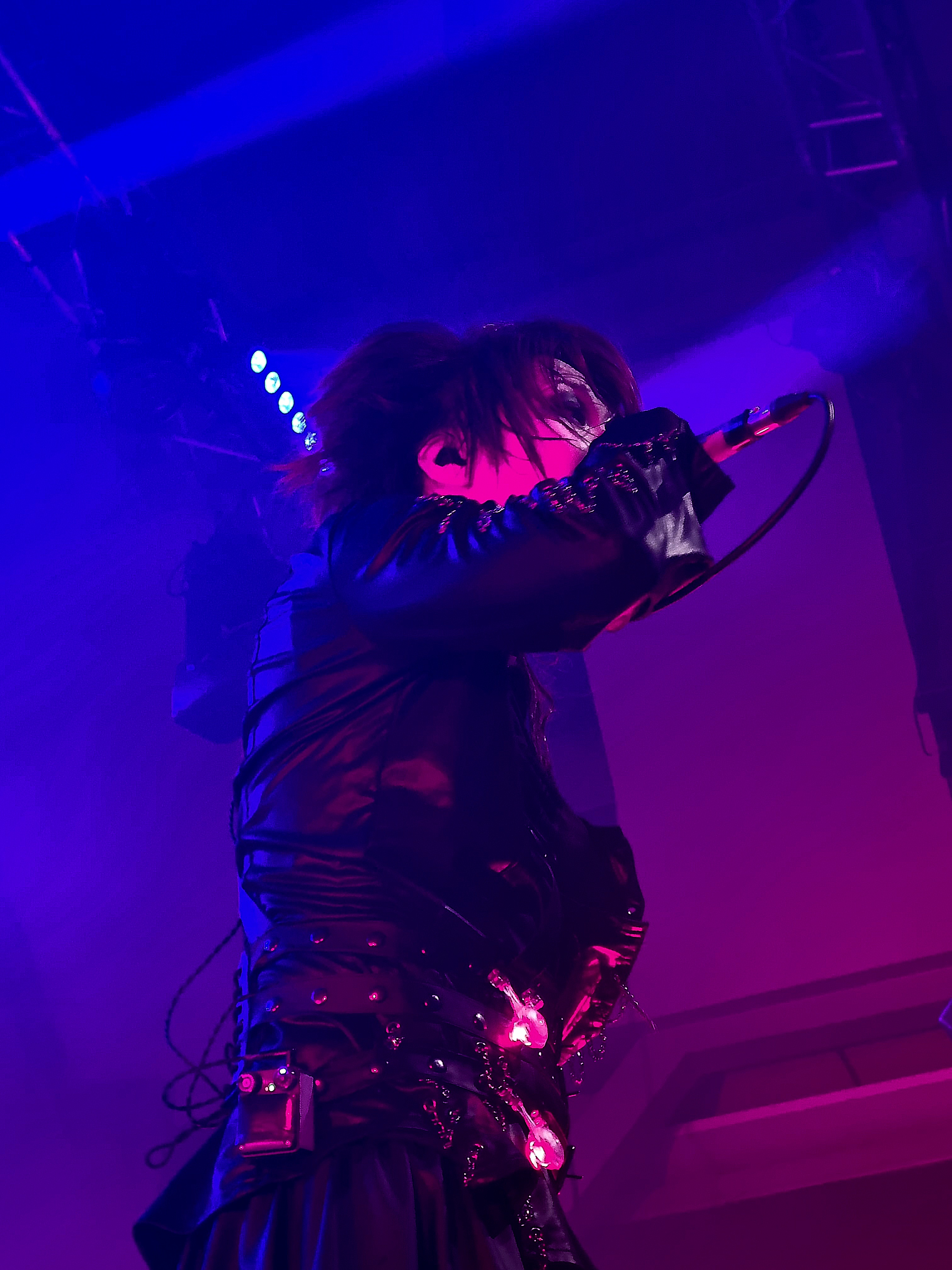
Due to the success of K4RMA, Jiluka embarked on a second Europe tour the same year. (Image: vocalist Ricko)

Jiluka performed a free online show available worldwide from Twitch hosted by Chaotic Harmony store on February 21, 2021. In the second half of the year, the new album Idola was announced, scheduled for September 15, and the music video for "Kumari" was uploaded to YouTube in August. The DVD Live: The Synergy was sold exclusively at the last performance of the tour promoting Idola, held on March 18, 2022, in Tokyo. Another tour alongside Leetspeak Monsters began on May 1, 2022, and a collaborative CD between the two bands, Amphisbaena, was sold exclusively at these shows. Produced by Jeff Dunne, the digital single "Blvck" was released in September.

The 2022 Mad Pit Tour started in November. Meanwhile, Zyean supported Cazqui's (Nocturnal Bloodlust) solo project, Cazqui's Brutal Orchestra, on the release of "The Button Eyes". Sena and Boogie, who are models of Mana's brand Moi-même-Moitié, participated in an event for the brand on December 19. On February 18, 2023, Jiluka participated in the Dex Fest 2023 festival, hosted by Dexcore. In the same month, they released the single "Overkill" which was followed by "Venom" in September.

Jiluka made their first performance in the United States in October at Anime Weekend Atlanta 2023. A month later, it was revealed that they would play at Evil Live Festival in Lisbon, Portugal becoming the first visual kei band to perform in the country. Taking advantage of the festival date, the band announced their first world tour named K4RMA with five solo dates in Europe; in the cities of Bratislava, Warsaw, Cologne, Paris and London which all sold out plus the Resurrection Fest in Spain and a show in Los Angeles in July. Due to the success of K4RMA, they returned to Europe in September with K4RMA - The Return, this time with two new countries: Italy and Finland, and finishing it with a show in China. A four-date tour in United States started in late October.

On February 16, 2025, Jiluka released the single "KVLT", promoted by two concerts called "Dominvant" in Osaka and Tokyo. The physical version of the single will be sold at the second date. In March 8 begun an extensive tour in the United States, as a support act of Imminence together with Landmvrks. In June, Jiluka will begin their 2025 world tour The KVLT, which this time will include South America in addition to Europe. The opening and closing shows of the tour will be in Tokyo. In Brazil, they will play at Anime Summit.

== Musical style ==
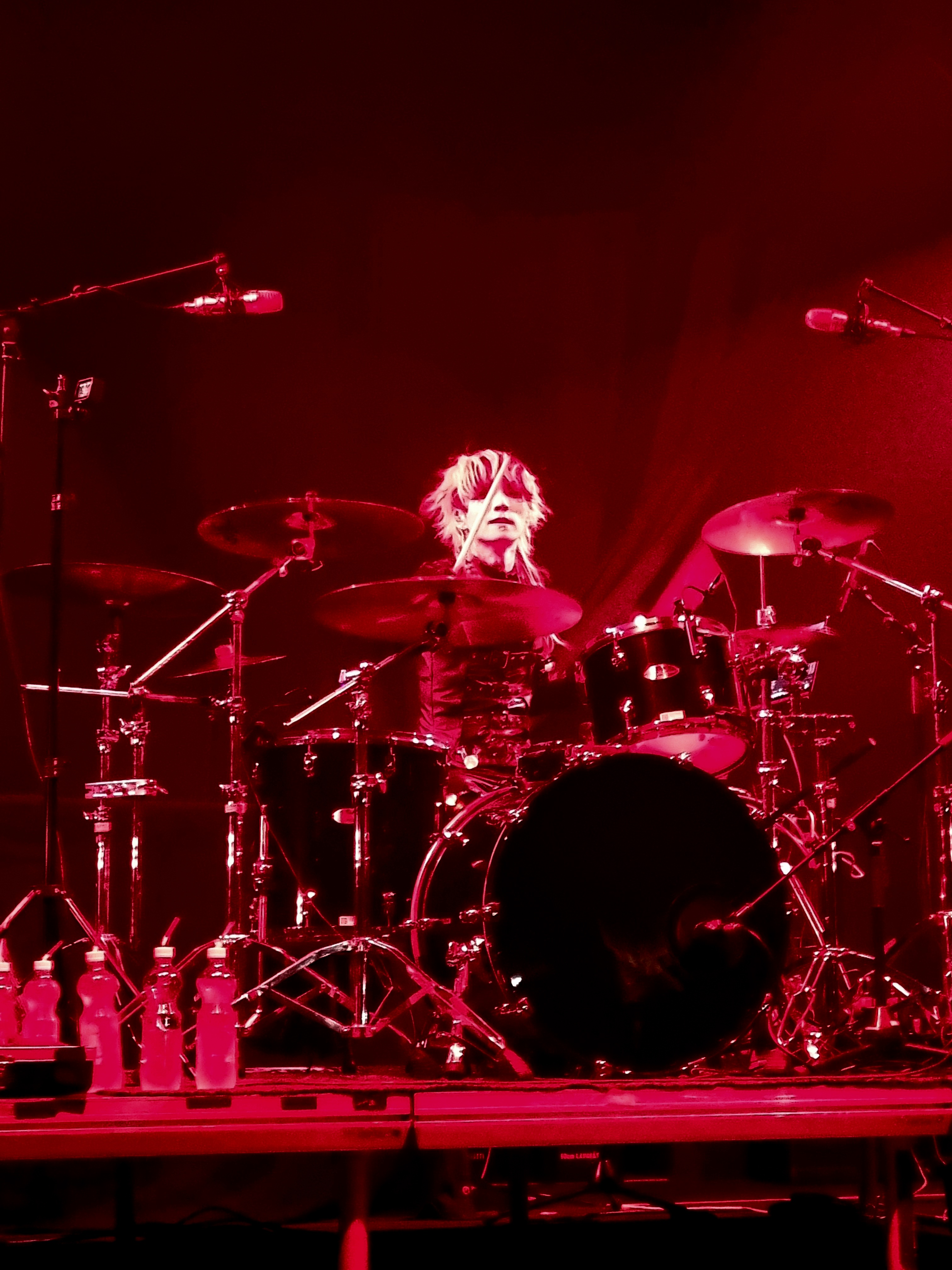
Zyean, who listens of a wide variety of metal bands, said he wasn't fond of playing drums in high school.

Jiluka's musicality is presented as metal, mostly metalcore. Describing "Twisted Pain", Jrock News claimed that the song features "heavy drums with double pedals, fancy guitar solo and fry scream vocals". Barks stated that "the band's technical and intense sound draws attention" and commenting about "Divine Error", describes it as "a heavy melody". The band also incorporate hip hop and electronic dance music elements into their music.

=== Influences ===
Jiluka cites as their main influence, among all the members, the Japanese band X Japan. Sena says he used to listen to hip-hop until a friend urged him to listen to X Japan's "Kurenai"; he became a guitarist inspired by Hide and Pata. After that, he looked for other rock artists. In an interview with Gekirock, Sena mentions Kansas, Rixton, Boston and Hikaru Utada as artists he likes. Ricko says that he likes rap, being a fan of Linkin Park and that he also used to listen to L'Arc-en-Ciel. Boogie claims he listens to a bit of everything, like Luna Sea and Korn, but Slipknot brought him into metal. Zyean says he listens to a lot of metal and its subgenres, like Metallica, Bullet for My Valentine, Rhapsody of Fire, Behemoth, among many others.

All members claim that at the beginning of their musical careers they were from different positions. Ricko used to play guitar but the band he was part of didn't have a vocalist, and despite being insecure, he started to sing. Even though Sena's influences encouraged him to play guitar, he initially played drums, as stated by himself. Zyean started listening to death metal and other types of extreme metal when he was a student. He was a self-taught vocalist who also played guitar and bass: "To be honest, I didn't want to play drums back then." In another interview, he claimed that a drummer classmate convinced him to play. Like Ricko, Boogie said that a bass player was missing on the band that he was invited to play.

== Members ==
- Ricko (リコ) – vocals (2013–present)
- Sena (セナ) – guitar (2013–present), backing vocals, rapping (2023-present)
- Boogie (ブギー) – bass guitar (2013–present)
- Zyean (ジェーン) – drums (2015–present)

=== Former members ===
- JaiL – drums (2013)

== Discography ==
=== Albums ===
- Brave Agonistic Letters Under Segregation (April 8, 2015)
- Destrieb (August 5, 2015)
- Xenomorphic (June 28, 2017) (Oricon Albums Chart: 257)
- Metamorphose (September 12, 2018) (Oricon Albums Chart: 67; Indies Albums: 8)
- Polyhedron (May 29, 2019) (Oricon: 102)
- Xanadu (November 13, 2019) (Oricon: 83)
- Xtopia (October 14, 2020) (Oricon: 88)
- Idola (September 15, 2021) (Oricon: 125)

=== Singles ===
- "Screamer" (February 4, 2015)
- "Lluvia" (November 11, 2015)
- "Faizh" (April 20, 2016, Oricon Singles Chart: 157)
- "Divine Error" (December 21, 2016, Oricon: 110)
- "Ajna -SgVer-" (October 25, 2017, Oricon: 186)
- "Hellraiser" (May 20, 2018)
- "Ignite" (July 1, 2020)
- "Blvck" (September 28, 2022)
- "Venom" (October 27, 2023)
- "Overkill" (March 8, 2023)
- "S4vage" (October 10, 2024)
- "Kvlt" (February 8, 2025)
- "DeViLs" (February 5, 2026)
