= Mogwai (disambiguation) =

Mogwai are a Scottish post-rock band.

Mogwai may also refer to:

- Mogwai (Chinese culture), a demon in Chinese tradition
- Mogwai, a species of fictional creature (based on the Chinese demon) in the films Gremlins and Gremlins 2: The New Batch
- Mogwai, Japanese musician and bass player of Kamaitachi

== See also ==
- Moguai, a German DJ and music producer
- Chab, a Swiss progressive house producer who releases under the name Moogwai
