= Gargoyle (band) =

Japanese band

- Origin: Osaka Prefecture, Japan
- Genre: Thrash metal
- Years active: 1987–present
- Labels: Nippon Columbia; First Cell
- Members: Kiba
- Past members: Real Jack; She-ja; Yotaro; Kentaro; Toshi; Not; Misaki; Katsuji
- Website: firstcell.net/gargoyle/

Gargoyle (Japanese: ガーゴイル, Hepburn: Gāgoiru) is a Japanese thrash metal band formed in Osaka Prefecture in 1987. The band was formed in July 1987, led by vocalist KIBA. After some changes in members, they started musical activities in earnest in November 1988. In April 1993, they signed for the major label Nippon Columbia, and released three studio albums (天論, 月の棘, natural) and two compilation albums (異人伝, borderless). From 1996, they went back to indie. In 2017, they marked their 30th anniversary since the band's formation. On 6 September 2018, KENTARO, TOSHI, and KATSUJI left the band with a solo live show “美しき時代”(beautiful days). In January 2019, KIBA started UNDER GARGOYLE. Taking 34th anniversary in July 2021, they will act as Gargoyle again.

== Members ==
- Vocal：Kiba (October 20, 1965) from Kobe, Japan

=== Past members ===
- Guitar：Real Jack
- Guitar：She-ja
- Guitar：Yotaro
- Drums：Not
- Drums：Misaki
- Guitar：Kentaro (June 10, 1972) from Osaka, Japan
- Bass：Toshi (September 6, 1965) from Kobe, Japan
- Drums：Katsuji (September 11, 1971) from Osaka, Japan

=== Timeline ===
KTASUJI is also a support drummer of a rock band The Cro-Magnons by the name of Katsuji Kirita (桐田勝治).

==== UNDER GARGOYLE members ====
UNDER GARGOYLE is a band, where a vocalist KIBA plays Gargoyle songs with various musicians. They plan to hold a live show on the first Saturday of each month at Takadanobaba club PHASE from January, 2019. Before that, they held their first live show at the same venue in the 2018-19 countdown event with the title of “l underland 00”.

- Guitar：KOUSUKE, HISASHI（AMANE）
- Bass：SHINGO☆、長野典二
- Drums：末房央、K

== Summary ==
Gargoyle is said to be a pioneer of visual kei and an authority on hard music scene in Japan. Beyond their visuals, they are renowned for being a band that has worked their way up to being “the king of live music clubs” for more than a quarter of a century. In their indie era, they sold out multiple solo concerts at Shibuya Public Hall. In 1992, a year before their major debut, they won a first prize of indie band section in a project called "LEADERS POLE 1991" held by a magazine “Rockin'f” (the second was Luna Sea and the third was COLOR）.

== History ==
=== 1987 - 1991 ===
1987

- In July 1987, the band was formed in Osaka.

1988

- In November 1988, after some changes in members, they started musical activities in earnest (KIBA, TOSHI, 屍忌蛇, KATSUJI).

1989

- In October 1989, the first album “禊 (Misogi)”was released.

1990

- In November 1990, the second album “檄 (Furebumi)”was released.

1991

- In April 1991, 3rd album “璞 (Aratama)” was released. (a set of three musical compositionsog”‘禊〜檄〜璞”)

=== 1993 - 1996 ===
1993

- In April 1993, they made major debut by releasing “タントラ・マントラ (Tantra Mantra)” from Nippon Columbia.
- In May, they released 4th album “天論 (Tenron)’.

After that, due to G.屍忌蛇's leaving the band, KENTARO and 与太郎 joined.

- In November, they acted at Marquee club in London as a headliner, which was the first of Japanese bands.

1994

- In February 1994, 5th album ”月の棘 (Tsuki no toge)” was released.

1995

- In March 1995, 6th album “Natural” was released.
- In May, 4 CDs BOX “異人伝 (Ijinden)”, which collected precious songs in their indie era, was released. (Sold out by only reservation)

1996

- In June 1996, best album “borderless”, the compilation of them after their major debut, was released.

After that, they left Nippon Columbia and went back to indie.

- In December, they released VIDEO “絶滅種 (Zetsumetsu syu)”, in which members did everything from shooting to editing.

=== 1997 - 2000 ===
1997

- In July 1997, they started their 10th anniversary solo tour ”回天 (Kaiten)”. Single “SAT0RI” was sold at venues only.

1998

- In February, mini album “巡礼印 (Jyunreiin)” containing 7 tracks were released.
- In July, 7th Album”我意在 (Gaia)”was released.
- In December, all night solo live show “終わりのはじまり'98全曲制覇 (Owari no hajimari '98 zenkyokuseiha)” was carried out at THE CHICKEN GEORGE, a live music pub at Kobe. After the show, video set containing 6 volumes “終わりのはじまり(Owari no hajimari)”, which was an uncut recording of that show, was released and sold out. (an additional volume of making video was provided for only those who bought the videos in set.)

2000

- In April, their first live shooting album “封印〜Who in?〜”, which selected songs from each of the total 21 shows of the previous year's nation-across tour “pre-tournament21”, was released.
- In December, 8th Album ”future drug /for shops” was released. The album was also sold only at venues of 未来薬(Miraiyaku) tour by the name of “future drug/for venues” with some songs different from that for shops.

=== 2001 - 2010 ===
2001

- In May 2001, they succeeded in a completely self-produced live show “未来劇薬 (Miraigekiyaku)”at Nippon Seinenkan, as the final show of their nation-across tour “未来薬(Miraiyaku)”.
- Also in May 2001, their management office & label “First Cell”was created by the band.
- In the same month, 14 tack album entitled “future drug/complete version” was released. That album combined ”future drug /for shops”with“future drug/for venues”, and added “future drug” and “ZIPANG/original version”, which had been performed only at their live shows.
- In July, VIDEO “鬼神〜実録"未来劇薬"〜”, which recorded the 未来薬(Miraiyaku) tour, in their solo live show “鬼神覚醒 (Kijinkakusei)”at ON AIR EAST.
- In the same month, solo live tour “鬼神再生 (kijinsaisei)”started. After that, during the time preparing for the creation of a new album succeeding “future drug”, Gu.与太郎 expressed his will of leaving the band.
- In October, remaining 4 members started recording the new album.
- In November, in the conceptual live show “帝王切開2000”with cali≠gari, Gu.与太郎 officially left the band.
- In December, new Gargoyle performed on the stage for the first time on their all night live show “細胞分裂(Saiboubunretsu)〜second impression〜”, which was planned and hosted by themselves.

2002

- In April 2002, 9th album “倭 (Wa)”was released.
- In the same month, their official web site “零細胞” was created.
- In May, solo live tour “倭ノ刻印 (Wa no kokuin)”started.
- In July, as the final show of “倭ノ刻印 (Wa no kokuin)”tour, they held 15th anniversary live show at Shibuya ON AIR WEST.
- In October, "Battle Gargoyle"., another band of them, revived after 5 years' absence and their first original album “武神 (Bushin)” was released.
- In the same month, they held “天下一武闘会2002” tour of 10 locations throughout Japan.
  - Battle Gargoyle was a conceptual band, under which Gargoyle members wore all leather aggressive costumes and held show containing only fast thrash songs. Their live show had so aggressive without MC and encores that can be said to be masochistic.
- In December, they planned and hosted an all night live show “きわもの歌合戦” at Ebisu GUILTY.

2003

- In February 2003, VIDEO “襲撃するは我にあり”, which recorded Battle Gargoyle's tour “天下一武闘会2002” at the last year, was released.
- In July, solo live tour “爆弾中毒 (Bakudan chudoku)”started (total 14 shows).
- In October, 10th Album “獣道 (Kemonomichi)”was released.
- In November, solo live tour “さらばかつての獣達よ”started (totaling 27 shows).
- In December, they planned and hosted the all night live show “きわもの歌合戦” at Takadanobaba club PHASE.

2004

- In July 2004, 10 discs DVD-BOX”天地日月 (Tenchinithigetsu)-我在護意留全集1987～2004-”, which was a historic movie of Gargoyle’s 17 year career containing 7 titles, 3 clips, and special movies were included for the DVD, was released.)
- In the same year, solo live tour “天地日月(Tenchinithigetsu)” started. (totaling 16 shows including an additional show).
- In December, they carried out “non-stop one-man all-night live!(Owari naki hajimari)”, where they performed 81 songs.

2005

- In August 2005, 11th album ”龍風 (Ronpuu)” and the first product of re-recorded best album "G-manual" series “G-manual I” was released.
- At the same month, solo live tour “龍風列島(Ronpuu rettou” started. (totaling 18 shows)
- In December, they planned and hosted an all night live show “Gargoyleと愉快な仲間達〜CHICKEN GEORGE Special Last Night〜” at THE CHICKEN GEORGE in Kobe.

2006

- In April, the second product of re-recorded best album "G-manual" series “G-manual II” was released.
- In July, split album of Gargoyle＆SHAME “SPLIT OUR SPIRIT” was released.
- In the same month, coupling tour “狂い咲きサンターロード” started. (totaling 11 shows)
- In December, they planned and hosted an all night show “live・a・la・mode” at Takadanobaba PHASE.

2007

- In January 2007, a solo live show “Countdown 20th!!” was held at Shibuya O-West.
- In March, a solo live show “Grand countdown 20th!!” was held at ESAKA MUSE in Osaka.
- In May, the third product of re-recorded best album "G-manual" series “G-manual III” was released.
- In the same month, a solo live show “Final countdown 20th!!” was held at ESAKA MUSE in Osaka at ESAKA MUSE and Takadanobaba PHASE.
- In July, 12th album “刃 (Yaiba)” was released.
- In the same month, their 20th anniversary solo live show “虹遊 (Nijiyuu)” was held at Yokohama BLITZ.
- In the same month, a solo live tour “刃フルスロットル (Yaiba full shrottle)” started. (total 20 shows)
- In December, they planned and hosted an all night show “live・a・la・mode” at Takadanobaba PHASE.

2008

- In March 2008, the memorial tour for releasing Gargoyle tribute album “狂い咲きサンダーストーム” started.
- In May, Battle Gargoyle's tour (in Tokyo, Nagoya and Osaka) “Super Battle Gargoyle” was held.
- In the same month, they released Gargoyle tribute album “Gargoism”、, Battle Gargoyle's “Super Battle Gargoyle”, and the 20th anniversary live shooting DVD “虹遊” were released for three weeks straight.
- In September, event tour with Inugami Circus-dan and test-No. “黒帯ロッカーズ (Kuroobi rockers)” started. (totaling 8 shows)
- In the same month, Battle Gargoyle's live shooting DVD “Super Battle Gargoyle” was released.
- In December, they planned and hosted an all night show “live・a・la・mode” at Takadanobaba PHASE.

2009

- In March 2009, a solo live tour for Gargoyle's 1000th career “～Tour Road to 1,000～” started. (totaling 14 shows)
- In September, 13th album “黒密典 (Kuromitten)” was released.

Solo live tour “密典カーニバル (Mitten carnival)” started.（totaling 15 shows）

- In the same month, the 1000th anniversary live show “1,000 carnival 〜1,000〜” was held at CLUB CITTA' in Kawasaki.
- In December, they planned and hosted all night show “live・a・la・mode” at Takadanobaba PHASE.

2010

- In April 2010, a solo live tour “1ヶ月戦争” started. (totaling 7 shows)
- In June, an event tour with SEX MACHINEGUNS “日本ライブ王決定戦” started. (all 7 shows)
- In September, an event tour with Inugami Circus-dan and test-No. “黒帯ロッカーズ 2010 (Kuroobi rockers)” started. (totaling 15 shows)
- In December, they planned and hosted an all night show “live・a・la・mode” at Takadanobaba PHASE.

=== 2011 - 2020 ===
2011

- In May 2011, 14th album”鬼書 (Kisho)” was released. Solo live tour “鬼の葬列” started. (totaling 17 shows)

2012

- In July 2012, Gargoyle's 25th anniversary album "虹融合 (Nijiyuugou)”, which re-construct and re-recorded their past tracks, was released.

2013

- In April 2013, 15th album”奇獣 (Kijyuu)” was releasesd.

A solo live tour “奇獣轟爆” started. (totaling 13 shows）

- In July, 26th anniversary live show “忍獣ROCK戦隊 ガーゴレンジャー” was held.
- In November, a solo live show “flerovium〜フユゴイル” was held.

2014

- In January 2014, a solo live tour “春射る矢” started. (totaling 16 shows）
- In March, they planned and hosted battle live show festival “Battle Of King Monsters 2014” at Shinjuku BLAZE.
- In June, event tour with Inugami Circus-dan and test-No. “黒帯ロッカーズ 20104(Kuroobi rockers)” started. (totaling 3 shows)
- In July. 27th anniversary live show “完全に自由な何かを” was held.
- In August, 16th album “解識 〜geshiki〜” was released.
- In September, a solo live tour “解識之式” started. (totaling 13 shows）.
- In November, 10,000 days career anniversary live show “9,999日 救世孔雀麒龍穹/ 10,000日 萬願成就” was held. (totaling 2 shows)

2015

- In February 2015, their first women-only live show “女の中の女”and male-only “男の中の男” were held.
- In March, event tour “狂い咲きジャパロック” with UCHUSENTAI:NOIZ, Dear Loving, バックドロップシンデレラ, The Benjamin, 電脳オヴラアト, 21g, and ADAPTER。started.
- In July, 28th anniversary live show “王蜂 -KING BEE-“ was held.
- In August, Gargoyle MV collectuon “龍の銃が死の影を結ぶ” was released.
- In the same month, a solo live tour “髑髏龍” started. (totaling 15 shows)

2016

- In July 2016, 29th anniversary live show “虹往く” was held.
- In August, they performed at CHAIN the ROCK FES.2016.
- In the same month, 17th album “誑 〜taburakashi〜” was released.
- In September, a solo live tour “混じり合う異なる血” started. (totaling 16 shows including additional show)
- In October, they performed at VISUAL JAPAN SUMMIT 2016 Powered by Rakuten.
- In November, an event tour with Inugami Circus-dan and test-No. “黒帯ロッカーズ 2016(Kuroobi rockers)” started. (totaling 3 shows)

2017

- In April 2017, countdown 30th live show “94の太陽” was held.
- In May, event live shows “Golden Battle Week” are scheduled to be held on every day from 3rd to 7th.
- In the same month, event live shows with THE SLUT BANKS ”1996 FIND MY WAY TOUR” were held. (totaling 2 shows)
- In July, their 30th anniversary live show “太陽光線〜SUNRAY〜” was held with guest guitarists, 屍忌蛇 and 与太郎.

Their 30th anniversary album “Best 30 years”, which had re-recorded existing 30 songs and 10 opening SE tunes including new SE "太陽光線（SUN RAY）", was released.

- In August, event live shows with Ningen Isu was held.
- In September, a solo live tour "Best 30 Years"started. (totaling 14 shows)
- In December, their 30th anniversary history book was released.

2018

- From 2nd to 6th in May and from 1st to 3rd in July 2018, solo concerts “Beginning of the end”, the complete Gargoyle concerts where they play all their songs including Battle Gargoyle's for 8 days, was held.
- In July, their 31st anniversary live show “燦獣威血”was held.
- In September, KENTARO, TOSHI, and KATSUJI left the band after a solo live show “美しき時代”(beautiful days) at Shibuya O-East.

2019

- In January, KIBA started UNDER GARGOYLE.
- In March, live shooting DVD “美しき時代”(beautiful days) was released.
- In July, their 32nd anniversary live show “underland FES.～Gargoyle 32nd -Live not alone!-” was held.

2020

- On July 19, 22 and 24, their 33rd anniversary live show “underland FES. –神も無為と(God is also idle)-”were held as live stream.
- On October 11, UNDER GARGOYLE solo live "underland 17", where all 禊 (Misogi) songs were performed, was held.
- On December 6, UNDER GARGOYLE solo live "underland 20", which KATSUJI took part in, was held.

=== 2021 - ===
2021

- On July 22, 34th Anniversary live show “I am Gargoyle” day1 was held. Support: KENTARO(Gt)
- On August 7, 34th Anniversary live show “I am Gargoyle” day2 was held. Support: KATSUJI (Dr)

2022

- On July 10, Gargoyle 35th Anniversary live show “paraíso TOKYO” is scheduled to be held.Support: TOSHI(Ba)
- On August 11, Gargoyle 35th Anniversary live show “paraíso OSAKA” is scheduled to be held.

== Discography ==
=== Demos ===
- CRAZY SADISM (September 24, 1987)

=== Singles for free distribution ===
- HUNTING DAYS -Live Version- (1990年)

=== Singles ===
- 蠢(Ugomeki) (July 6, 1989)
- SATORI (December 6, 1989)

=== Full-length albums ===
- 禊 (Misogi) (October 13, 1989)
- 檄 (Furebumi) (November 11, 1990)
- 璞 (Aratama) (April 4, 1992)
- 天論 (May 1, 1993)
- 月の棘 (February 21, 1994)
- Natural (March 1, 1995)
- 我意在 (Gaia) (July 26, 1998)
- Future Drug (complete version) (December 17, 2001)
- 倭 (April 20, 2002)
- 獣道 (October 18, 2003)
- 龍風 (August 15, 2005)
- 刃 (Yaiba) (July 15, 2007)
- 黒密典 (September 3, 2009)
- 鬼書 (April 24, 2011)
- 奇獣 (April 13, 2013), Oricon Weekly Albums Top Position: 251
- 解識 (Geshiki) (August 27, 2014), Oricon Weekly Albums Top Position: 184
- 誑 (Taburakashi) (August 31, 2016), Oricon Weekly Albums Top Position: 157

=== VIDEOs ===
- こけおどし (April 1, 1990)
- タントラ マントラ (April 1, 1993)
- 絶滅種(Zetsumetsushu) (December 1, 1996)
- 終わりのはじまり (April 22, 1999)
- 鬼神 (July 15, 2001)
- 襲撃するは我にあり (in the name of "Battle Gargoyle")

=== DVD ===
- 天地日月(Tenchinichigetsu) -我在護意留全集1987〜2004- (July 10, 2004)
- 虹遊 (June 23, 2008)
- Super Battle Gargoyle (in the name of "Battle Gargoyle", September 15, 2008)
- 1000 カーニバル(1000 carnival) (May 2, 2010)
- 虹融合 (January 15, 2013)※25th anniversary live shooting DVD
- 龍の銃が死の影を結ぶ (August 22, 2015)※MV clip
- 美しき時代 (March, 2019)※～KENTARO, TOSHI, and KATSUJI's final live show
