= Eight (Japanese band) =

Japanese visual kei rock band

- Origin: Japan
- Genres: Alternative metal; hard rock; nu metal
- Years active: 2004–2010
- Labels: Relative+Heart, Abbey Road
- Past members: U Nachi; Mukku; Mitsuru; Kyotaro; Ryo

Eight (sometimes typeset as √eight or THE EIGHT) was a Japanese visual kei rock band from Hokkaido. They were formed in 2004 by Nachi and Kyotaro after Nachi's previous band Werkmare had disbanded. The band used to be signed to Nachi's own label, Relative+Heart. They disbanded in early 2010.

== Biography ==
Eight was formed by guitarist Nachi (formerly of Werkmare) and vocalist Kyotaro (formerly of Volark) in 2004, who were soon joined by bassist Mukku (also from Werkmare) and drummer Mitsuru (formerly of ArcAdiA). Soon after the formation they released two Demo-CDs, followed by another demo-CD in 2005 as well as several DVDs and contributions to V.A.-releases, most of these independently released. Guitarist Nachi and bassist Mukku were support members of Japanese punk band Anti Feminism during 2007, and Nachi and drummer Mitsuru have been support members of Japanese rock band The Piass from 2009 on.

In 2006 they released their first album, Illational, which was co-produced by Kenzi of Japanese punk band Anti Feminism. At the end of the year they released two more DVDs which showed their tour finals in Sapporo. In 2007 the band was joined by guitarist Ryo (ex-Since1889), and the name of the band was changed to THE EIGHT. They spoke of releasing a new album in late 2007, but this was never realised due to vocalist Kyotaro leaving the band in December to join Black:List. In December 2008, the band Black:List disbanded, and vocalist Kyotaro has decided to retire from music entirely due to family issues.

Shortly after vocalist Kyotaro's leave, guitarist Ryo also left the band. In August 2008, female vocalist U (ex-Low Head Machine) joined the band. In June 2009, drummer Mitsuru temporarily left the band due to injuries. THE EIGHT used a support drummer, Jun, until drummer Mitsuru returned in August 2009, the band's fifth anniversary.

On December 24, 2009, the announcement was made that the band would disband after their live show on January 17, 2010. Since then, guitarist Nachi and drummer Mitsuru have become members for Japanese punk rock band The Piass, and bassist Mukku also played as a support member for The Piass in 2010. Kyotaro briefly joined Japanese band Kanabun on guitar in 2010, and formed the band Cockroach in 2011. Nachi, Mukku and Mitsuru have also formed a new band, Haze, similar to eight.

== Members ==
- U - Vocals (2008–2010)
- Nachi (那智) - Guitar, vocals (2004–2010)
- Mukku (ムック) - Bass guitar (2004–2010)
- Mitsuru (みつる) - Drums, keyboards (2004–2010)

=== Former members ===
- Kyotaro (狂太郎) - Vocals, harmonica (2004–2007)
- Ryo - Guitar (2007–2008)
- Jun - Drums (support member) (2009)

== Discography ==
=== Demo-CDs ===
- "Sensen Fukoku" (宣戦布告) (April 17, 2004)
- "Musou Ranbu" (無双乱舞) (August 1, 2004)
- "Saraba Kimi yo" (さらば君よ) (2004)
- "Fake" (2004)
- "Yuigadokuson" (唯我独尊) (March 6, 2005)
- "Hissatsu eight Kiri" (必殺eight斬り) (August 15, 2005)
- "Zouo" (憎悪) (December 31, 2005)
- "No future of the sorrow" (June 1, 2007)

=== Albums ===
- Illational (September 20, 2006)

=== Compilations ===
CD

- "Individual Insistence" (April 1, 2005)

With the songs "Sanchoume no Yuuhi"(三丁目の夕日), "Down" and "Fake".

- "Resident of Delusion" (July 27, 2005)

With the song "Aa Kugatsu no Sora"(あぁ九月の空).

- "Radicals Charge" (December 12, 2005)

With the song "Hitori Pocchi" (一人ぽっち).

- "Relative+Heart" (December 24, 2005)

With the songs "Kareta Kokoro" (枯れた心) and "Mr. Stalking" (Mr.ストーキング).

- "New Born Kerberos" (September 15, 2006)

With the song "Let me stay".

- "Kiwami Code 02" (極-KIWAMI-code:02, September 1, 2007)

With the song "Yoake no Yami de..."(夜明けの闇で…。).

DVD

- "Sapporo Live Diary eight teki 8 channel vol.1" (札幌LIVE日記eight的8ちゃんねるvol.1) (January 14, 2006)
- "Sapporo Live Diary eight teki 8 channel vol.2" (札幌LIVE日記eight的8ちゃんねるvol.2) (February 25, 2006)
- "Sapporo Live Diary eight teki 8 channel vol.3" (札幌LIVE日記eight的8ちゃんねるvol.3) (March 24, 2006)
- "Sapporo Live Diary eight teki 8 channel vol.4" (札幌LIVE日記eight的8ちゃんねるvol.4) (April 2006)
- "Sapporo Live Diary eight teki 8 channel vol.5" (札幌LIVE日記eight的8ちゃんねるvol.5) (May 28, 2006)
- "Sapporo Live Diary eight teki 8 channel vol.6" (札幌LIVE日記eight的8ちゃんねるvol.6) (July 29, 2006)
- "Michinoku Soul" (2012)

== Videography ==
=== VHS ===
- "Sensen Fukoku" (宣戦布告) (April 17, 2004)
- "Musou Ranbu" (無双乱舞) (August 1, 2004)
- "Isshokusokuhatsu" (一触即発) (October 10, 2004)

=== DVD ===
- "Musou Ranbu" (無双乱舞) (August 1, 2004)
- "Isshokusokuhatsu Special DVD" (一触即発) (October 10, 2004)
- "Isshokusokuhatsu" (一触即発) (October 24, 2004)
- "Tengai Kodoku" (天涯孤独)(June 25, 2005)
- "Sensen Fukoku" (宣戦布告) (August 15, 2005)
- "Ware ga Shihaika ni Zairi" (我ガ支配下ニ在リ) (August 20, 2005)
- "Sapporo Live Diary eight teki 8 channel Bessatsu pt. 1" (札幌LIVE日記eight的8ちゃんねる別冊Pt.1) (October 12, 2006)
- "Sapporo Live Diary eight teki 8 channel Bessatsu pt. 2" (札幌LIVE日記eight的8ちゃんねる別冊Pt.2) (October 12, 2006)
