= Skull (band) =

Japanese visual kei hard rock band

- Also known as: Skull -The Skull- (2003–2007)
- Origin: Japan
- Genres: Hard rock
- Years active: 2003–2011
- Labels: Timely Records; G.O.D DIV; PLUG RECORDS
- Past members: Sin; Die; Kouta; Ryou; Tetsuya; Sakura
- Website: Skull-web.com (defunct)

Skull (stylized as SKULL), originally known as Skull -The Skull- (スカル -THE SKULL-, sukaru -THE SKULL-), was a Japanese visual kei hard rock band that was active between 2003 and 2011.

== Biography ==
The band Skull formed under the name Skull -The Skull- in 2003, but did not begin regular activities until the following year. The group focused most of their early performances in the Sendai region and slowly began to build momentum. In 2005, they released their first single, Jisaku jien, and went on their first tour. The band continued to hold consistent live performances throughout the year and through 2006. On December 26, they held their first-ever one-man performance at the Sendai Macana venue.

At the beginning of 2007, the band officially changed their name to Skull and began expanding their presence across Japan. Skull put out their first release in two years with the maxi-single The Scream of Gate on January 26, and scheduled numerous tours for the year. The single quickly sold out, and Skull reissued a second print of the CD bundled with a new DVD of their first music video in June. In August, Skull released their first mini-album, Ugly Black Showcase, which placed the weekly Oricon Albums Chart at number 299.

During 2008, Skull began the year by hosting a one-man show at Takadanobaba Area on January 19. In July, both Skull and Rentrer en Soi were a part of a three-man special sponsored by Dio at Shibuya Boxx. During this live, bassist Sakura announced he would be leaving the band following their one-man performance on September 15 due to a disagreement with the band's future. Skull continued on, and in August, they teamed up with Oz for a two-man tour of Japan. Following Sakura's departure after their September performance, the band briefly went on hiatus.

In February 2009, Skull sponsored an event at Takadanobaba Area featuring several other bands. During the event, the group announced the addition of bassist Ryou and guitarist Kouta to their lineup, and simultaneously revealed two new upcoming singles. Following the success of their previous mashup, Skull and Oz announced that they would again team up for an August tour. In September, members Die and Kouta partnered with accessory company Vanilla Edge to release their own personalized jewelry.

Skull released their second mini-album Natural born killer in January 2010, then followed up with a one-man show promotion in February. The band later released two singles in July and August, and shared a tour across Japan with Oz for the third year in a row. On November 29, the band announced it would disband in 2011 for undisclosed reasons, and dissolved all activities after their final performance in June 2011. Members Die, Ryou, and Tetsuya later went on to join the band My Bacteria Heat Island, but all three simultaneously left the band in August 2015. Soon after, Skull announced they would host a one-day revival show in December at Ikebukuro Edge. Skull repeated this the following year by holding one last one-day revival at Takadanobaba Area in December 2016.

== Musical style ==
Skull's music incorporated a variety of different styles, blending elements such as metal and lighter melodies into their usual hard rock mix. The band was especially notable for its aggressive live shows and the level of engagement they had with their audience. Skull often catered the style of their musical compositions towards their live performances.

== Members ==
- Sin – vocals (2003–2011)
- Die (ダイ, Dai) – guitar (2003–2011)
- Kouta – guitar (2009–2011)
- Ryou (りょう) – bass guitar (2009–2011)
- Tetsuya (てつや) – drums (2003–2011)

Former members

- Sakura (さくら) – bass guitar (2003–2008)

== Discography ==
=== Mini albums ===
- Ugly Black Showcase (August 15, 2007)
- Natural born killer (ナチュラルボーンキラー, January 20, 2010)

=== Singles ===
- "Jisaku jien" (自作自演, January 9, 2005)
- "The Scream of Gate" (January 26, 2007)
- "Bullet" (March 21, 2008)
- "Awake" (May 20, 2009)
- "Skin" (July 22, 2009)
- ""Kagerou" "Souen" (｢陽炎｣｢蒼炎｣, July 7, 2010)
- "Nancy" (August 8, 2010)

=== Live distributed CDs ===
- Lovehate/Shadow (June 13, 2003)
- Sunny Days/Too Fast (December 15, 2003)
- Bad "S" (March 8, 2004)
- Tear drop January 27, 2006)
- My glitter (May 3, 2008)
- Nega no haguruma (ネガの歯車, May 6, 2008)
- Fake flower (May 10, 2008)
- Sayonara (サヨナラ, May 16, 2008)
