= Dimlim =

Japanese visual kei rock band

- Origin: Japan
- Genres: Rock; math rock; djent; metalcore; deathcore; progressive rock
- Years active: 2017–2022
- Labels: Ultimate Illuminati (2017); DUM LABEL. (2018–2022)
- Past members: Sho; Retsu; Hiroshi; Issei; Ryuya; Tsubasa; Taishi
- Website: https://dimlim.jp

Dimlim (stylized in all caps) was a Japanese visual kei rock band established in 2017, currently on the label DUM LABEL with the members Sho, Retsu and Hiroshi.

== Career ==
=== Formation, Various and Chedoara (2017–2018) ===
The band was formed in April 2017 by Ryuya, former member of Deviloof, Issei, former member of D.I.D, Sho, Retsu and Tsubasa. They released their debut EP, Various, on June 3, 2017, exclusively at their oneman first show in Ikebukuro Black Hole. For official sale, the EP was released on August 23, 2017, accompanied by the release of the video clip for Shoucho (初潮) on their official YouTube channel. Later, on November 9, Issei and Tsubasa left the band. According to Retsu, the band's name comes from "DIM", somber, and "LIM", gear.

At the band's first anniversary concert, on June 3, 2018, they released a double single: Watashi... (私...) and Boku... (僕...) (Both words mean "I/me" in Japanese) and announced the release of a complete new album, Chedoara, which was released on August 8, 2018. On December 16, they performed at the Metal Square vol. 4 festival in Shibuya, with other bands like Jiluka, Nocturnal Bloodlust and Deviloof.

=== Member changes, MISC. and disbandment (2019–2022) ===
In 2019 they released the single "Rijin" on June 5, with their video clip in a hospital. In an interview with the Japanese magazine Toppa, Sho said that he has dissociative disorder (not to be confused with dissociative personality disorder or multiple personality disorder) and the single talks about his experience with the condition.

On August 17, guitarist Ryuya and bassist Taishi decided to leave the band after a performance at Tsutaya O-West. Taishi left due to illness and Ryuya left due to artistic differences. Despite the announcement, the band moved on with only three members and announced a new album, Misc., previously scheduled to December 2019. The music video for "What's up?" officially came on their official YouTube channel on January 25, 2020, and shows that the band's musical style changed to a less heavy direction. Misc. was postponed and finally released on January 28, 2020.

On May 1, 2020, they opened their official brand of merchandise, "Dimer Tokyo".

DIMLIM announced four performances outside Japan in 2020. Initially only in Mexico, they expanded to shows in Brazil, Chile, and Russia. The performance in Mexico was canceled due to low demand but was reconfirmed. However, all shows were postponed due to the COVID-19 pandemic.

In December 2021, the band announced their disbandment, with a last show scheduled for February 25, 2022, at Shibuya WOMB.

== Influences ==
In an interview with Gekirock, vocalist Sho said that one of his biggest influences is the band Dir En Grey and the vocalist Kyo. In the same interview, guitarist Retsu mentions he is a big fan of visual kei band The Gazette and also mentions he likes the bands Bring Me the Horizon, Erra and Periphery.

== Band members ==
Final line up

- Sho – Vocals (2017–2022)
- Retsu – Guitar (2017–2022)
- Hiroshi – Drums (2018–2022)

Former members

- Ryuya – Guitar (2017–2019)
- Issei – Drums (2017)
- Tsubasa – Bass (2017)
- Taishi – Bass (2018–2019)

Timeline

== Discography ==
=== Albums ===
| Title | Release | Oricon chart |
|---|---|---|
| Various | August 23, 2017 | 164 |
| Chedoara | August 8, 2018 | 194 |
| Misc. | January 28, 2020 | – |

=== Singles ===
| Title | Release |
|---|---|
| Kioku, Konpeki no Hohoemi (記憶、紺碧の微笑み) | October 21, 2017 |
| The Silent Song | December 27, 2017 |
| 「」 | January 27, 2018 |
| Boku... (僕...) | June 2, 2018 |
| Watashi... (私...) | June 3, 2018 |
| Rijin (離人) | June 5, 2019 |
| Kidoairaku (喜怒哀楽) | August 17, 2019 |
