= Si mian chu ge =

Si mian chu ge (四面楚歌) is a Chinese idiom which literally means "Chu song from four sides", may refers to:

- A tactic employed in the Battle of Gaixia, from which the idiom originated
- Shimensoka, a 1985 demo tape by Japanese band Kamaitachi
- An episode in a 2004 Hong Kong TV series The Conqueror's Story
- "Besieged From All Sides" (Sì Miàn Chǔ Gē), a 2005 song by Jay Chou from album November's Chopin
