= Strawberry Song Orchestra =

Japanese band

Strawberry Song Orchestra (ストロベリーソングオーケストラ) is a Japanese band who call themselves freak show punk. They consist of 14 core members, 7 of whom are actors.

== History ==
There are three vocalists, a male (harsh vocals) and two female (melodic), along with a drummer, bassist, guitarist, and keyboardist. They often have a guest shamisen player present at concerts. Performances consist of an overall theater-based formula with musical performances interspersed between. Some performances are as short as 30 minutes and some can run as long as two and a half hours.

== Members ==
Current

- Troupe Leader - Miyaaku Se'nsha (Vocals)
- Tsukikage Mika (Vocals)
- Ikyo Akane (Vocals)
- Kamata Eiki (Drums)
- Kirihira Ranse (Bass)
- Morita Tetsudou (Guitar)
- Choujyo Shoko (Keyboards)
- Toki Utamo (Actor)
- Amou Chiyako (Actress)
- Kotobuki Souya (Actor)
- Yoshie (Actress)
- Kiriko (Actress)
- Mayuzumi Kaiko (Actress)
- Ekibasha Chūsuke (Actor)

Former members include

- F (Actress) (Left 2005)
- Hazuki (Actress) (Left 2005)
- Araaki (Guitar) (Left 2005)
- Mariik (Bass)
- Megido A Kusume (Drums)
- Ma Bou (Guitar)
- Akanuma Kyana (Keyboards)
- Monopoly Seiko (Keyboards)
- Raijin Taito (Drums) (Left 2007)
- Fumita Kokuu (Drums) (Left 2009)
- Takahashi Hideo (Keyboards) (Left 2009)
- Dan Minako (Actress) (Left 2009)
- Honda Mariko (Vocals) (Left 2010)
- Uchida Kaori (Vocals) (Left 2010)
- Kourui Mariko (Actress/Vocals) (Left 2010)
- Kadowaki Montblanc (Actor) (Left 2011)
- Yayoi Yuriko (Actress) (Left 2011)
- Azami Chihiro (Actress) (Left 2011)
- Kuchikase Kanako (Actress) (Left 2012)

== History ==
Strawberry Song Orchestra was formed in 1998 by troupe leader Miyaaku Sensha. The following year, they began performing concerts in Osaka and Tokyo, playing their first independently planned event in 2003. In 2004, their first album, "Kagamimachi ni te" (In the Town of Mirrors) was sold from their independent label, Dokudenpasha, and the band was included on the Kameari Records compilation "Choushigeki Entertainment 3."

A split album featuring Strawberry Song Orchestra and Satanyanko entitled "Strawberry Song Orchestra and the Demonic Cat" went on sale all over Japan in 2005. The jacket illustration was done by horror comic artist Inuki Kanako, with additional comments by the disabled public speaker, Torihada Minoru. 2005 also saw the group perform at the 70th birthday anniversary celebration of Terayama Shūji held in Osaka, which included the ex-Tenjou Sajiki actor Shouwa Seigo. In July of that year, actors from the first incarnation of SSO "graduated," leaving the group.

The first performance featuring the troupe's new members, presenting Edogawa Rampo's "Hakuchuumu" (A White Afternoon Dream), was held in December in Tokyo, Osaka, Hiroshima, and Kobe. The group also performed a drama featuring video footage entitled "A Tale of Fantasized Love" through 2006.

The DVD "Hakuchuumu" was released in July, 2006 following a promotional tour. It featured performance footage and the group's first music video, for the song "Manatsu no Temari Uta."

In February and August 2008, the band performed at an event entitled "Everyday Transformed into Hell" together with Inugami Circus-dan in Osaka and Nagoya. In May, the group once again collaborated with actor Shouwa Seigo. In September, they released the drama CD Mousou Renai Tan ("A Tale of Fantasized Love.") In November, a two-man performance with the theatre troupe Rakuichi Rakuza was held in Osaka.

In September 2009, SSO released their first full-length album, Chi no Ranshou (Origin of Blood). Pianist Hideo left the band and was replaced with Choujyo Shoko, and Kamata Eiki replaced drummer Fumita Kokuu. After various temporary singers rotated live performances, Ikyo Akane officially joined as a backing vocalist, solidifying the current lineup of musicians.

A music video for the song "Setsudan Dahlia" ("Cut-up Dahlia") was released in June 2010, featuring a new visual and performance concept for the band. The song was featured on the release of maxi-single "Setsudan no Igaku" ("Academy of Cutting") in October. Throughout 2011 and 2012, the band performed frequently at live venues, clubs and on the streets, gaining visibility. In March, 2012, actress Kuchikase Kanako left the troupe.

The band's latest CD release, "Gesshoku no Circus," was distributed exclusively at a one-man live performance on September 30, and became available for online preorder the same day for release on November 7.

== Past collaborations ==
Showa Seigo, Panta, Endou Michirou, Torihada Minoru, Shine Shine Dan, Inugami Circus-dan, Guruguru Eigakan, Haha Lemon, Oboreta Ebi no Kenshi Houkokusho, Simone Fukayuki, Mowmow Lulu Gyaban, Avantgarde, Mushakusha, Aural Vampire, Machilitt, Anti Feminism, Jubilee, QP Crazy, M, and many others.

== Discography ==
=== Albums ===
- Kagamimachi nite (鏡町にて) - 2004
- Mousou Renai Tan (妄想恋愛譚) - 2008
- Origin of Blood (血の濫觴) - 2009

=== Singles ===
- Setsudan no Igaku (切断の異學) - 2010
- Gesshoku no Circus (月蝕のサーカス) - 2012

=== DVD ===
- Hakuchuumu (白昼夢) - 2006
- Kakurenbo no Tou (かくれんぼの塔) - 2008

=== Compilation / Other ===
- Choushigeki Entertainment 3 - 2004
- Strawberry Song Orchestra to Akumaneko (苺楽團と悪魔猫) - 2005
- DARKER WATERS~deeper into the Japanese underground~ - 2008
- Tokyo Guerilla 2 (東京ゲリラ2) - 2009
- Kantenboukitan Original Soundtrack (観天忘奇譚 Original Soundtrack) - 2012
