= The Last: Colors and Infinity =

THE LAST ～colors～ THE LAST ～infinity～

Studio album by Panic Channel
- Released: March 18, 2009
- Genre: Pop/rock
- Label: Mission Music Factory

Panic Channel chronology
Ray (2008)	THE LAST ～colors～ THE LAST ～infinity～ (2009)

THE LAST ～colors～ and THE LAST ～infinity～ are two studio albums released by PANIC☆ch and the latter by its alter ego パニックちゃんねる on March 18, 2009.

== THE LAST ～colors～ Track listing ==
1. 829サービス
2. fairy
3. まじかるドリィマ～
4. 君と～「 」～
5. 片思ひ
6. Peace
7. together
8. デートゥ。（New Rec Ver）
9. Energy
10. Catch～walk up to the continue～
11. SPARKING
12. one's life
13. 雑草
14. ピンク・チェリー
15. つぼみ
16. 829パートナー

== THE LAST ～infinity～ Track listing ==
1. ナイフ
2. 餌
3. love less
4. 孤独妄想
5. Rouge
6. 雫
7. ラブレター（New Rec Ver）
8. いやがらせ
9. Unfiction
10. セ・ツ・ナ
11. 覚醒バニラ（New Rec Ver）
12. 過去忘レ…。
13. EMERALD
14. 無情麻薬
15. Clear（New Rec Ver）
16. Jewel

== Personnel ==
- MEGURU – vocals
- Kana – guitar
- Mayo - guitar
- kiri – bass
- KYO~YA – drums
