= Chedoara =

Studio album by Dimlim
- Released: March 8, 2018
- Recorded: March – August 2018
- Genres: Alternative metal; metalcore
- Length: 40:42
- Language: japanese
- Label: DUM LABEL.

Dimlim chronology
Various (2017)	Chedoara (2018)	Misc. (2020)

Chedoara (stylized as CHEDOARA) is the second studio and first full-length album by the Japanese band Dimlim, released on August 8, 2018. The promotional video for "Vanitas" was released on June 2, 2018 and the promotional video for "Aizou ni Tsuki" on August 1, 2018. Due to great demand and its two-month sell-out, the album was relaunched on December 23, 2018.

== Recording ==
A demo version of the track "Malformation" was recorded in November 2017, but the band started working seriously on the album in March 2018. The last adjustments were made at the last minute according to an interview with Gekirock.

== Critical reception ==
Chiaki Fujitani, of Gekirock, said that it is "[...] a work full of ambition and self-confidence, which not only seems alive, but also symbolizes a more expressive power. [...]"

The album peaked at the 194° position on the Oricon charts.

== Track listing ==
All lyrics are written by Sho; all music is composed by Retsu (Note: Retsu's nicknamed as "02")

No.	Title	Length
1.	"EXORDIUM"	2:17
2.	"GROTESQUE"	4:11
3.	"Malformation"	3:18
4.	"…Monogurui…Narite" (…物狂ひ…なりて)	2:37
5.	"Aizou ni Tsuki…" (愛憎につき…)	4:11
6.	"Kyou no Ri" (狂の理)	1:34
7.	"Ambitious principles"	2:40
8.	"Mad [K]"	3:47
9.	"Shigarami" (シガラミ)	4:05
10.	"D.Hymnus"	4:06
11.	"vanitas" (-CHEDOARA MIX-)	3:35
12.	"Hito" to "Katachi" (「人」と「形｣)	4:15
Total length:		40:42

== Personnel ==
- Sho – Singing
- Retsu – Guitar
- Ryuya – Guitar
- Taishi – Bass
- Hiroshi – Drums
