= The Dead Pop Stars =

Japanese visual kei rock band

- Also known as: D.P.S, d.p.s
- Origin: Japan
- Genres: Punk rock; hard rock; heavy metal
- Years active: 1992–present
- Labels: Anarchist; VAP Inc.; Free-Will/Firewall Division
- Members: Kenzi; Aki; Hideto; Ruiji; Kentarou
- Past members: Hiromi; Seigo; Taiji

The Dead Pop Stars (stylized as THE DEAD P☆P STARS) is a Japanese visual kei rock band formed in 1992 by ex-Kamaitachi drummer Kenzi. Its current line-up consists of original members Aki and Kenzi on vocals and drums respectively, Hideto and Kentarou on guitar, and Ruiji on bass.

== Band history ==
The Dead Pop Stars was formed in July 1992, when its members' previous bands all broke up. At the beginning of their career, numerous appearances at various small clubs was marked by persistent displays of violent behavior. This contributed to the formation of a menacing charisma, making them legendary within the independent visual kei scene. In 1997, they made a deal with major record label VAP and released the album D.P.S, but returned to the independent music scene the following year. In 2000, they released two singles and an album, but guitarist Hiromi and bassist Seigo left the band. Taiji joined as support guitarist, and Seigo returned the following year. Taiji and Hideto became official members in 2003, and the Dead Pop Stars became a five-member band. In 2005, Seigo left the band yet again and they released the album Star☆Ride, with La'cryma Christi bassist Shuse as a support musician. Support bassist Ruiji became an official member on September 6, 2007, at the band's 15th anniversary gig. On May 14, 2010, it was announced on the band's official mobile website that Taiji would be leaving the group. He was replaced by Kentarou, who joined on September 6. Despite the frequent, difficult-to-keep-track-of line-up changes The Dead Pop Stars remain a prolific touring act.

== Members ==
- Kenzi/Crazy Danger Nancy Ken chan – drums, percussion 1992–present (ex-Kamaitachi, Anti Feminism)
- Aki (愛生) – vocals, acoustic guitar 1992–present (ex-The Honey Beez)
- Hideto (秀斗) – guitar 2003–present (ex-Gellonimo)
- Ruiji – bass 2007–present (ex-The Piass, Anti Feminism)
- Kentarou (堅太郎) – guitar 2010–present

Former members

- Hiromi – guitar 1992–2000 (ex-Rosenfeld)
- Seigo – bass 1992–2000, 2001–2005 (ex-Girl Tique)
- Taiji Fujimoto – guitar 2003–2010 (ex-Judy and Mary, ex-Dirty Trashroad)

== Discography ==
Studio albums

- The Dead Pop 4 Drugs (November 21, 1992)
- Self Violence (July 24, 1994)
- Protest 2 Speed Story (May 21, 1995)
- D.P.S (June 1, 1997)
- Heart Break Bandits (July 26, 2000)
- Star☆Ride (August 31, 2005)
- Quick & Dead (December 5, 2018)

Compilation albums

- Hybrid☆Best-Dead Side≠Pop Side- (June 29, 2005)
- For You Ballade Selection (August 1, 2007)

Singles

- "The All New Generation" (May 26, 1996, distributed for free at Shibuya On Air East)
- "Ever Free ~Niji no Kanatae~/Daydreamday Sanjigen no Hakuchuumu" (EVER FREE ～虹の彼方へ～/DAYDREAMDAY ～三次元の白昼夢～; October 1, 1997)
- "Tic (July 1, 1999)
- "Justice/Reject (Destruction Mix)" (1999)
- "...self/The All New Generation" (1999)
- "...for you- Special Edition 2000-"
- "Take Off -Kaze ni Kukarete-" (TAKE OFF-風に吹かれて-; July 18, 2000)
- "Star★Lover" (April 27, 2002)
- "[Chaos-JP]" (December 1, 2002)
- "Judgement×Suspicion" (September 6, 2006)
- "Itoshiki Hito e" (いとしきひとへ; September 6, 2006)
- "Badmen" (January 21, 2018)

Videos

- Madness (発狂; April 28, 1995)
- Out... D-Day -Mad for Love- 1997.03.14 Shibuya On Air East (OUT...D-DAY ～狂うために愛する～ 1997.03.14 渋谷ON AIR EAST; June 30, 1997)
- With 92720-00212 (June 28, 2000)
- God Save the Revolution (June 27, 2012)
- The 20th Anniversary Memorial Day (October 21, 2015)
