= Various (album) =

EP by Dimlim
- Released: June 3, 2017
- Genre: Metalcore
- Language: Japanese
- Label: Ultimate Illuminati

Dimlim chronology
Various (2017)	Chedoara (2018)

Various (stylized in all caps) is the debut EP by the Japanese visual kei band Dimlim, from the label Ultimate Illuminati (subsidiary of Tower Records). It was originally released on June 3, 2017, exclusively at the band's debut show in Ikebukuro Black Hole. For sale, it was released in two editions, regular and limited, on August 23, 2017.

The promotional video for "Shochou" (初潮) aired the same day. The song uses a sample from the song "Children", by Robert Miles.

The live limited-edition version of Various was later relauched in Dimlim's official webstore, opened in May 2020. Also, it was made available digitally through Spotify, Apple Music and YouTube Music on August 10, 2022, along with the single "The Silent Song".

== Charts ==
The album peaked at number 164 on the Oricon charts.

== Track listing ==
All lyrics are written by Sho; all music is composed by Issei

Regular edition
No.	Title	Length
1.	"Aharewata" (アハレワタ)
2.	"THE INVISIBLE"
3.	"destroy a desire"
4.	"Mental Health Dance" (メンタルヘルスダンス)
5.	"Regret"
6.	"Shoucho"

Limited edition
No.	Title	Length
1.	"Aharewata" (アハレワタ)
2.	"THE INVISIBLE"
3.	"limit of reverse"
4.	"MASSACRE"
5.	"Regret"
6.	"Shoucho" (初潮)
7.	"Aharewata" (Music video)
8.	"Shoucho" (Music video)

Live limited edition
No.	Title	Length
1.	"Aharewata" (アハレワタ)
2.	"THE INVISIBLE"
3.	"Kyomo no Uta" (虚妄の歌)
4.	"Jyoudo no Hana" (浄土の花)
5.	"Regret"
6.	"Shoucho" (初潮)

== Personnel ==
- Sho – Vocals
- Retsu – Guitar
- Ryuya – Guitar
- Tsubasa – Bass
- Issei – Drums
