= Misc. (album) =

MISC.

Studio album by Dimlim
- Released: January 28, 2020
- Genres: Alternative rock; math rock
- Length: 42:15
- Languages: English; Japanese
- Label: DUM LABEL.

Dimlim chronology
| CHEDOARA (2018) | MISC. (2020) |

MISC. is the third studio and second full-length album by the Japanese visual kei band DIMLIM, released on January 28, 2020 by DUM LABEL. The album was planned to be released in December 2019 but has been postponed to January 28.

== Overview ==
The album distanced itself from the band's original sound, which was previously influenced by deathcore and metalcore, now fits into the genres of math rock and alternative rock. In an interview with JaME World, Sho said that the name of the album "comes from the essence of several places", thus giving the name miscellany. Regarding the musical genre of the album, Retsu said "we think DIMLIM is its own musical genre [...]" and Sho said, "there have been big changes in the way we see the music [...]".

== Tour ==
DIMLIM announced their first overseas tour in 2020, promoting the album's release. It has dates in Mexico, Brazil, Chile and Russia. The concert in Mexico was canceled due to low demand but afterwards it was confirmed by another company.

The concerts were scheduled to take place at the beginning of the year, but they were all postponed until the end of the year due to the COVID-19 pandemic.

== Track listing ==
The band switched to English the name of the tracks with the original name in Japanese (not necessarily the translation) only for overseas digital releases. The album booklet came with the lyrics in Japanese, but most of the songs are sung in English.

All lyrics are written by Sho; all music is composed by DIMLIM

| No. | Title | Length |
|---|---|---|
| 1. | "We've changed.NOW IT'S YOUR TURN NEXT" | 1:03 |
| 2. | "MIST" | 3:37 |
| 3. | "真夜中に私を連れ出して" (Take me out in the midnight) | 3:44 |
| 4. | "Funny world" | 3:39 |
| 5. | "What's up ?" | 4:23 |
| 6. | "+ & −" | 1:51 |
| 7. | "For the future" | 3:28 |
| 8. | "Tick Tak" | 3:35 |
| 9. | "気付かない者たちへ" (TO FOOL) | 3:25 |
| 10. | "Before it's too late" | 3:41 |
| 11. | "out of the darkness" | 4:37 |
| 12. | "Lament" | 5:05 |
| Total length: | | 42:15 |

== Personnel ==
- Sho - Vocal
- Retsu - Guitar
- Hiroshi - Drums
