= Leetspeak Monsters =

Japanese visual kei rock band

- Origin: Japan
- Genres: Rock; gothic rock; rap rock
- Years active: 2009 –present
- Labels: GLK Music
- Members: D13; Yo’shmeer; Euskyss; DieWolf
- Past members: Mattünurg
- Website: leetspeak-monsters.com

Leetspeak Monsters (stylized as Leetspeak monsters) is a Japanese visual kei rock band whose songs and appearance are centered around Halloween and dark fantasy themes. The band members perform as characters from the fictional city of "Gravetown", with each adopting an archetypal "monster" persona.

== History ==
Leetspeak Monsters released their first single "Monster's Party" with label GLK Music in 2017, following band leader D13's concept of creating a "crossover of rock and hip hop within the imagery of a haunted house." In the same year, the band released a mini-album Storyteller in the Strange Night, followed by their first full-length album Monster's Theater, which ranked in the top 100 on the Oricon album chart.

The band's subsequent releases continued to expand the mythology of Leetspeak Monsters' fictional home of "Gravetown", with lyrics in English and Japanese about normal people having scary encounters. D13 insists that the true meaning of the band's name will remain a secret, saying that he enjoys hearing different interpretations from their audience.

In 2018, Leetspeak Monsters released the mini-album Mixtured night between Life and Death and a single covering The Nightmare Before Christmas theme song "This is Halloween", resulting from D13's admiration of filmmaker Tim Burton and composer Danny Elfman.

On May 26, 2018, Leetspeak Monsters began their one-man tour of Japan called "Leetspeak monsters 1st Oneman Tour Life and Death Tour - Seija to sisya no yoru". The tour went across 3 cities with the final performance at Takadanobaba CLUB PHASE on June 3.

In 2019, the band released the maxi-single 13th Friday Night and their second full album Monster's Theater II. They also contributed an original song, "Gekkouin -Moonlight Shadow", to the album Bad Ass Temple Funky Sounds from seiyuu rap project Hypnosis Mic.

In 2020, Leetspeak Monsters released the maxi-single "Beltane", named after the Gaelic bonfire ritual.

== Band members ==
Current members

- D13 (skeleton cemetery guide) - vocals (2009–present)
- Euskyss (vampire prince) - bass (2011–present)
- Yo’shmeer (Frankenstein's monster) - guitar (2017–present)
- DieWolf (werewolf) - drums (2011–present)

Former members

- Mattünurg - guitar

== Discography ==
=== Studio albums ===
Year	Album details	Oricon
2017	Monster's Theater: Released: July 11, 2018; Label: GLK Music	90
2019	Monster's Theater II: Released: October 9, 2019; Label: GLK Music	106

=== Singles and EPs ===
Year	Single and EP details	Oricon
2017	"Monster's Party" (maxi-single): Released: May 15, 2017; Label: GLK Music	—
2017	"Storyteller in the Strange Night" (mini-album): Released: September 20, 2017; Label: GLK Music	—
2018	"Mixtured night between Life and Death" (mini-album): Released: March 21, 2018; Label: GLK Music	112
2018	"This is Halloween" (maxi-single): Released: October 3, 2018; Label: GLK Music	53
2019	"13th Friday Night" (maxi-single): Released: April 3, 2019; Label: GLK Music	64
2020	"Beltane" (maxi-single): Released: April 15, 2020; Label: GLK Music	44

== Videography ==
=== Music Videos ===
- 2017: "Monster's Party"
- 2017: "Black Owl"
- 2018: "This is Halloween"
- 2018: "Wonderland"
- 2018: "Greenman"
- 2019: "13th Friday night"
- 2019: "Gothic"
- 2020: "Beltane"
