= Unsraw =

Japanese visual kei metal band

UnsraW
- Origin: Japan
- Genres: Metalcore, alternative metal, melodic death metal
- Years active: 2006–2011
- Labels: Speed Disk/XXX (JP); CLJ Records (EU)
- Spinoff of: Core The Child
- Past members: Madoka; Tetsu; Shou; Jin; Jun; Rai; Yuuki
- Website: www.unsraw.com/pc/

Unsraw (Japanese: アンスロウ, Hepburn: Ansurō; stylized as UnsraW) was a Japanese visual kei metal band signed to the label Speed Disk. They formed in July 2006 and disbanded in 2011.

== Biography ==
After the dissolution of the independent band Core the Child, vocalist Yuuki and drummer Shou started a new project called UnsraW. The band performed several "secret lives" with no releases, and were scouted by Speed Disk, a record label specializing in visual kei bands.

After signing to Speed Disk, UnsraW released the singles "-9-" and "Gate of Death". Both singles were limited to a 1000-copy pressing, and sold out quickly. In late 2006, the band released its first EP, Spiral Circle in two types, which also sold out soon after release.

Beginning in 2007, UnsraW began releasing material in Europe through import label CLJ Records, with their first full-length album Spiral Circle -Complete-, and concert DVD Screaming Birthday. The band went on to release another single leading to a pair of EPs in the summer of 2007 titled Abel and Kein (a reference to Cain and Abel). Abel was released in August, while Kein was released on September 26. The two EPs were released as a single album in Europe with a bonus track, and later in Japan with a differing bonus track.

After a few shows initiating 2008, Yuuki became suddenly ill and unable to perform with the band. The rest of the members performed instrumental shows, not wanting to cancel any performances. In April, it was revealed Yuuki would be returning to music, but that he was still fighting a lung disease. In May UnsraW announced they would be pausing activities until Yuuki had recovered.

In June 2009, UnsraW announced that Yuuki had made a full recovery, and they would perform two return lives scheduled in August to celebrate Yuuki's return. Unfortunately, due to a hand injury acquired in a motorcycle accident on 24 December 2008, bassist Jun decided to withdraw from the band.

After restarting their activities in August, UnsraW announced the release of their first single after one-year hiatus. The single was released on 23 September and included three songs: Nightmare, Reborn, and Switch.

On 13 January 2010 it was announced Rai would be leaving UnsraW on February 27, after their European tour. Upon Rai's departure, two new members were introduced: Madoka (円) and Jin (迅). It was also announced they'd be doing a one-man live show on 19 April 2010 called "Trace of Guilt" in Takadanobaba area.

On 3 March 2011, Unsraw disbanded, following the departure of vocalist Yuuki. This information was released on their official website, but the band still performed their remaining scheduled shows.

A year after their disbandment announcement, Yuuki made public on Unsraw's website his desire of doing a second final performance with the band due to his absence in 2011. The concert was scheduled on June 23 at Ikebukuro EDGE, entitled "Gate of Birth".

== Band members ==
=== Current line-up ===
- Yuuki - vocals, piano, programming, composer/lyricist
- Madoka - guitar
- Tetsu - guitar
- Jin - bass guitar
- Shou - drums, composer

=== Previous members ===
- Jun - bass guitar
- Rai - guitar

== Discography ==
=== Albums ===
- Spiral Circle -Complete- (January 24, 2007)
- Abel/Kein (September 26, 2007)

=== Extended plays ===
- Spiral Circle (December 20, 2006)
- Calling (March 28, 2007)
- Abel (August 29, 2007)
- Kein (September 26, 2007)
- Guilty (April 21, 2010)

=== Singles ===
- "-9-" (August 30, 2006)
- "Gate of Death" (October 25, 2006)
- "Lustful Days" (June 27, 2007)
- "Reborn" (September 23, 2009)
- "Kleza in Utero" (November 19, 2010)
- "Kleza in Marsh" (December 21, 2010)
- "Kleza in Red Clay" (January 16, 2011)
- "Karma (UNPLUGGED Ver.) / WITHERING BLOOD (UNPLUGGED Ver.)" (December 31, 2012)
- "-9- (UNPLUGGED Ver.) / Sakura no Namida (UNPLUGGED Ver.)" (January 16, 2013)

=== DVDs ===
- Screaming Birthday (June 27, 2007)
- Gate of Birth (January, 2013)
