= Panic Channel =

Japanese visual kei rock band

- Origin: Japan
- Genres: Rock
- Years active: 2002–2010
- Labels: Mission Music Factory, CLJ Records
- Past members: Yuusuke; Tara; Tsubasa; Takumi; Meguru; Kana; Kiri; Kyo-Ya

Panic Channel (パニックちゃんねる, sometimes written PANIC☆ch) was an independent Japanese visual kei rock band signed to Mission Music Factory. They perform under two personae: パニックちゃんねる is their gothy visual kei side, and PANIC☆ch is a light visual boy band side.

== Biography ==
Panic Channel (known in Japanese as パニックちゃんねる pronounced as panikku channeru) was founded by Meguru (ex- GARASU), Kana, and Tara in November 2002. In January 2003, the line-up of the band consisted of Meguru (Vo), Kana (G), Tsubasa (G), Tara (Ba), and Yuusuke (Dr). After two months, in March 2003 the band decided to show their “second face.” The alter ego PANIC☆ch was born.

Panic Channel gave their debut in May of that year at the Osaka club Vijon where they sold their first video tape Panic Channel Kyouzai Video. After that event, the band started advance; they had one gig after another, always switching between the two egos during the long line of events.

The band had its first oneman at the Urawa Narciss on 21 September 2003. It was completely sold out. One day later, they sold their first single Debutsen ~minna no chikai hen~ which sold out the same day, it has not been printed again. Panic Channel kept on performing, most of the time at the Meguro Rock May Kan. Towards the end of the year, they released their first mini-album.

In the beginning of 2004, the Shinjisen ~Yume ni mukatte hen~ tour was listed on Panic Channel's schedule, it ended on St. Valentine's Day, 14 February, in the Meguro Rock May Kan.

On March 18, there was another oneman in the same concert hall where both personalities of the band performed. After that concert, the drummer Yuusuke left the band. Takumi (ex- Aile) substituted him at first only as a support member, but he became the official drummer of Panic Channel on April 3.

In September, Panic Channel's label Mission Music Factory arranged together with Undercode Productions (Kisaki) a two-man concert with Panic Channel and Undercode-band's Karen. On September 23 and 26, the bands stood on stage together.

In the beginning of October, the band took part in the Mad Tea Party Vol. 4 which was sponsored by the band D. Afterwards, Panic Channel had a couple of performances again. From the 13th and 17 December 2004, performances at the Meguro Rock May Kan took place, arranged by Panic Channel. On those five days, Panic Channel played together with Iroha, Gift, HenzeL, and Luvie. The event ended with a “パニックちゃんねる vs. PANIC☆ch” oneman. After those concerts, Tara was brought to the hospital because of ear problems. Panic Channel continued performing and temporarily was supported by Gift's bassist, Saburo. Subsequently, the recording of their new album was rescheduled.

After more performances in 2005, Tara's recovery was announced in February, the new album was eventually recorded. Tara's first performance after recovering took place in Nagoya's Shinsakae MUJIKA on 10 March. Yet, after the UnderCode 3 Day event final on 22 March 2005, in Osaka, Meguru announced that Tara had to go to the hospital again because of new ear problems. During the time in hospital, Tara announced that he would leave the band because of his ear, just as the fans suspected. The true reason is apparently that Tara already did not see himself as member of the band anymore because in the end of 2005 he started the new band project Betty with Yuu (ex-Never Crazy), they later formed the now disbanded 176BIZ.

After Tara's departure, on 28 August, the band announced after a concert that Tsubasa and Takumi were going to leave the band. Their farewell concert was on 30 October. Meguru and Kana remained.

In the beginning of January 2006, Meguru announced that positions in the band would be replaced by MAYO (G), kiri (Ba), and KYO～YA (Dr). In February and March, the band had a nationwide tour, seven secret concerts included, where they switched constantly between their alter-egos. In April 2006 and released two new singles, Plow~forward movement~ and Ishin.

It has been announced that they will be playing in AnimagiC Event in Germany in August 2009, meaning this will be the band's first time abroad, however MAYO may miss the event as he has been suffering from pneumothorax since April 26, recovery depends on the extent of the injury, though average recovery time is around six weeks. However, MAYO has returned to the band and has almost recovered at the end of their Best Album Tour.

Right on 29 August, also known as Pani Day, the band released their first ever live DVD. This DVD features the live session from Omotesando FAB from both パニックちゃんねる and PANIC☆ch. And the band has kicked of their Live DVD Tour " After the tears" on 9 September 2009.

On December 4, 2010 they made two grave announcements: drummer KYO~YA would be leaving, and both bands would go on an unknown long activity pause after a last live in March. As of March 2014, the website no longer connects to the band.

Vocalist Meguru and bassist Kiri has formed a new band: Advance by 666.

== Members ==
=== Current ===
- MEGURU - Vocals
- Kana (華那) - Guitar
- MAYO - Guitar
- Kiri - Bass
- none currently - Drums

=== Former ===
- KYO~YA - Drums
- Yuusuke - Drums
- Tara (たら) - Bass (→176Biz→the Riotts.)
- Tsubasa (翼) - Guitar (→176Biz known as Toki, "刻")
- Takumi (たくみ) - Drums

== Discography ==
=== Albums ===
- TRICK (March 26, 2005)
- THE LAST ～colors～ (March 18, 2009)
- THE LAST ～infinity～ (March 18, 2009)

=== Mini albums ===
- Shinjinsen"～yume ni mukatte hen～ (December 25, 2003)
- Invisible Line (February 2, 2007)
- Ray (August 29, 2008)
- Shave (March 19, 2010)

=== Singles ===
Single #	Single information	Track listing
1st	Debut sen"～minna no chikai hen～: Released: September 22, 2002; Limited edition of 2000 copies	Track listing: 1. SPARKING; 2. Kodoku Mousou
2nd	Zenkoku taikai sanbon sen～Iyagarase～: Released: July 29, 2004; Limited edition of 3000 copies	Track listing: 1. Kako Wasure…; 2. Iyagarase; 3. Love Letter (Trance Mix)
3rd	Zenkoku taikai sanbon sen～Free Style～: Released: August 29, 2004; Limited edition of 3000 copies	Track listing: 1. Zassou～be awake～; 2. Lovely☆; 3. 829 Service (Euro Mix)
4th	829 Service Day Live CD: Released: August 29, 2004; Free Live Distributed CD	Track listing: 1. Setsuna
5th	Zenkoku taikai sanbon sen～Kesshousen: Released: September 29, 2004	Track listing: 1. Rouge～love loan a rouge～; 2. Kataomohi; 3. Kodoku Mousou (Live Style)
6th	Plow～forward movement～: Released: April 19, 2006	Track listing: 1. together 2. Departures
7th	Ishin: Released: April 19, 2006	Track listing: 1. Zangai; 2. Mujou Mayaku
8th	Father's Expression: Released: January 25, 2009	Track listing: 1. 829 Partners; 2. Unfiction
9th	Mother's Expression: Released: January 25, 2009; Live Sold Single Only	Track listing: 1. THE LAST TEAR; 2. Gemini

=== Videos ===
- PV (PANIC☆VIDEO)～otameshi gentei hen～ (Apr. 24, 2004)
- PV (PANIC☆VIDEO)～tsuujou hen～ (May 1, 2004)
