= Dio – Distraught Overlord =

Japanese visual kei metal band

Dio Distraught Overlord
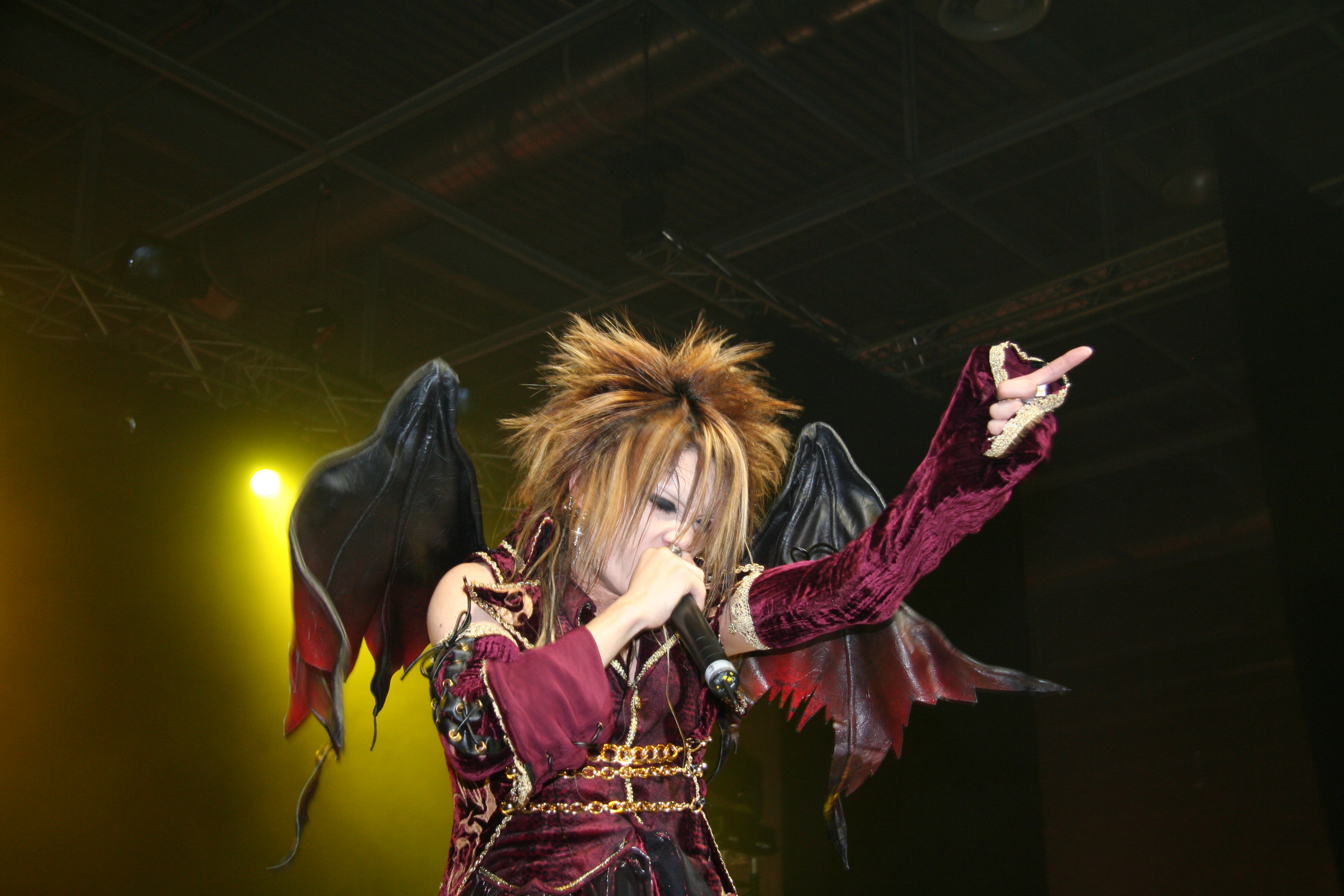
- Vocalist Mikaru at Japan Expo, 2007

Background information
- Origin: Tokyo, Japan
- Genres: Gothic metal; doom metal; melodic death metal; metalcore
- Years active: 2006–2010, 2016
- Label: Red List Entertainment
- Members: Mikaru; Kei; Ivy; Denka; Erina

Dio Distraught Overlord (ディオ –DISTRAUGHT OVERLORD–) was a Japanese visual kei metal band from Tokyo, formed on 14 May 2006. Rather than following the usual sound of visual kei, they were a darker, heavier band, which combined metal with melodious tones.

== History ==
Guitarist Erina left the group in September 2009 and they went on hiatus, until announcing that they were officially disbanding on 13 March 2010 and that the same line-up would reform as a new band. That same month, vocalist Mikaru started a project called Digras; its other members have not been announced yet.

In January 2011, bassist Ivy (now going by Tomoa) formed the band Remming.

In July, Mikaru and drummer Denka (now going by Syu) formed the band Black Line.

Erina became part of the band VII-Sense until their disbandment in 2012. Later on Erina supported various artists and bands on guitar. In 2017, Erina released a solo single/EP called CREATURE.

Distraught Overlord reunited in April 2016 for B7Klan's 10th anniversary European tour.

Guitarist Kei died in 2025.

== Members ==
Name	Instrument	Photo
Mikaru	vocals	
Kei	guitars	
Ivy	bass	
Denka	drums	
Erina	guitars	

=== Past members ===
- Seiya – drums (support)
- Shigure – guitars (support)

== Discography ==
Albums and extended plays

- Heaven's Call (27 February 2008)
- Dictator (26 December 2008)

Singles and maxi singles

- "Garasu no Umi" (14 May 2006)
- "Byakuya ni Moyuru Hana" (9 December 2006)
- "Byakuya ni Moyuru Hana ~Shi to Byoudou no Tsumi no Naka de~" (9 May 2007)
- "Byakuya ni Moyuru Hana ~Nanji, Ware wa Zennou no Mono Nari~" (10 October 2007)
- "Carry Dawn" (8 October 2008)
- "Coma Gold" (3 May 2009)
- "Coma Gold ~The God Dead~" (5 May 2009)
- "Byakuya ni Moyuru Hana" (5 April 2016)

DVDs

- Embrace of Distraught (8 August 2007)
- Forbidden Truth (unknown)
- Tour Dictator (22 April 2009)
- Tour Dictator Fool's Mate Limited Edition (22 May 2009)
- Final Call -Memorial DVD- (13 March 2010)

== See also ==
- List of gothic metal bands
- List of melodic death metal bands
- List of visual kei musical groups
