= Hybrid-Zombiez =

Japanese band

- Origin: Nagoya, Japan
- Genres: Alternative metal, metalcore
- Years active: 2003-2006
- Past members: Hari; Yusuke (ex-Hisui); Hisayoshi; Sencho

Hybrid-Zombiez (stylized as HYBRID-ZOMBIEZ) was a Japanese visual kei metal band formed in 2003 from Nagoya.

== History ==
The band formed in 2003 by vocalist Hari, guitarist Hisui (currently in lynch. using the name Yusuke), guitarist Yumehito (while in Primrose), bassist Hisayoshi and drummer Yuuki. In March 2004 they lost two of their founding members, Yumehito and Yuuki for reasons unknown. The band found a session drummer named Sencho, who eventually became an official member in September of the same year. The band continued activities as a 4-member band. They released their first and only public release, The Interior Of The Womb, in 2005. The mini-album was released at their live at HOLIDAY NAGOYA on October 22 and later became available at Like an Edison stores on November 20. After just two lives in 2006, the band announced that they would disband and their last live would be held on June 29 at ell. Fits All in Nagoya. At their last live their first and only single Mukei No Koe was distributed.

== Discography ==
=== Singles ===
- Mukei No Koe (29 June 2006)

=== EPs ===
- The Interior Of The Womb (20 November 2005)
