= Lycaon (band) =

Japanese visual kei rock band

- Origin: Japan
- Genres: Alternative metal; metalcore; post-hardcore; nu metal; gothic rock; jazz fusion
- Years active: 2007–2015
- Label: Shimizuya Records
- Past members: Yuuki; Zero; Satoshi; Hiyū; Ichirō; Mio; Eve
- Website: www.shimizuyarecords.jp/lycaon

Lycaon (リカオン, Rikaon) was a Japanese visual kei rock band formed in late 2007. Guitarist Rito (リト) changed his name to Zero (零) in 2013. Eve is always credited as Schlagzeug which means drums in German. The band has announced that they would be disbanding in November 2015.

== History ==
Lycaon have released multiple singles and albums that have charted on the Oricon Singles Chart and Oricon Albums Chart. As of February 2015, their highest-charting album is Camera Obscure, which reached number 48, and their highest ranking single is "Baka ne", which peaked at number 41.

According to the band, the album 嘘と女と『 』 is referred as an "Erotic Album". This album contain rerecording songs from their previous album, 情欲のアクメ, and their EP Eros along with a bonus song, Plug>into the>Soket, that was only released with a music video on the bonus DVD of Royal Order, their 2010 album.

In 2014, they released a cover version of Akina Nakamori's song Desire. It appears on a limited edition of their single Gossip-ゴシップ-. They also released a cover of the song ロザリオと薔薇 by SADS that was released on the tribute album M -Sads Respect Album-.

The former members have been in other projects since Lycaon. Eve has been in a band called AvelCain and helped them get signed at Shimizuya Records. 美央 has recorded bass on the first Dolce single and also been a support and concert member of Born.

In 2015, after the release of ジプシー (Gypsy) - which was to be the band's last single, Lycaon has announced that they would be disbanding after the last stop of their one-man tour on November 6 at Akasaka BLITZ.

=== Initial’L (2016–2022) ===
In September 2016, all the members of the last line-up of Lycaon formed a new band, Initial'L. On November 30, they released their first single, "MOON LIGHT DOWN". Initial’L disbanded after a final show on May 29, 2022.

== Members ==
=== Current ===
- Yuuki (悠希) – vocals (2007–2015)
- Zero (零) – lead guitar (2007–2015)
- Satoshi (サトシ) – rhythm guitar (2007–2015)
- Hiyū (緋遊) – bass guitar (2011–2015)
- Ichirō (一朗) – drums (2011–2015)

=== Past ===
- Mio (美央) – bass guitar (2007–2010)
- Eve (イヴ, Ivu) – drums (2007–2010)

== Discography ==
=== Albums ===
Ambrozia (2009)
Royal Order (2010)
情欲のアクメ (Jouyoku no Acme) (2011)
嘘と女と『 』(Uso to Onna to " ") (2011)
マゾヒストレッドサーカス (Masochist Red Circus) (2013)
Camera Obscura-カメラオブスキュラ- (2015)

=== Singles ===
RED RUM (2008)
Sad/Sick:ness (2008)
Chains Of collar (2009)
Cordyceps sinensis (2009)
Declaration of war (2009)
A Box In Beautiful (2009)
EROS (2010)
夢 (Yume) (2010)*
Aventure -アバンチュール- (2011)
Jesus (2011)
悪徳の栄え (Akutoku no Sakae) (2012)**
麻薬/眩暈-めまい- (Mayaku/Memai) (2012)
DAHLIA (2012)
SET ME FREE (2012)***
薔薇～Rose～ (2013)
gossip-ゴシップ- (2013)
馬鹿ね。(Baka ne.) (2014)
悪女の微笑 (Akujou no Hohoemi) (2014) Shadow (2014)
ジプシー (gypsy) (2015)
LAST DANCE (2015)****

*First live distributed single. **The single has been released in 6 different versions with a different b-side for each versions.Second live distributed single
****The single is Lycaon's last single before their disbandment.

=== EP ===
果たし状 (Split with R指定) (2010)
Eros (2010)
Huma.Dog/AbnormaRhythm/LV.III (Live split with ベルベット) (2013)

=== DVD ===
全国22ヶ所ワンマンツアー『ゆきずりの女』-TOUR FINAL-2011/11/26 名古屋Bottom Line (2012)
常識をブッ壊す!!Lycaonサトシの『オレがギターを教えてやるぜっ！』～入門編～ (2012)
Chains Of Collar DVD Clips (2009)

=== Compilations ===
JUDGMENT#003 (スマイルカンパニー/cosmic) (2008)
さわやか3組 2009 (Blue On Records) (2009)
Beauty & Beast (Shimizuya Records) (2010)
Explosion Showcase (Shoxx) (2011)
Brand New Wave (Avex Trax) (2013)
M -Sads Respect Album- (A Tribute To Sads) (Geishun) (2014)
