= Ray (EP) =

EP by Panic Channel
- Released: August 29, 2008
- Genre: Pop/rock
- Length: 21:36
- Label: Mission Music Factory

Panic Channel chronology
TRICK (2005)	Ray (2008)	THE LAST ～colors～(2009); THE LAST ～infinity～ (2009)

Ray is an EP released by Panic Channel on August 29, 2008.

== Track listing ==
1. "message" - 3:28
2. "Energy" - 3:29
3. "Tsubomi (つぼみ)" - 5:39
4. "EMERALD" - 4:38
5. "Kamisori (カミソリ)" (ナイフ) – 4:28
6. "Jewel" – 4:45

Bonus DVD (limited edition only) "together" "Mujou Mayaku" (無情麻薬)

A DVD was released as well, containing an additional music video for "together" and "Mujou Mayaku" (無情麻薬) .

== Personnel ==
- MEGURU – vocals
- Kana – guitar
- Mayo - guitar
- kiri – bass
- KYO~YA – drums
