= Sex-Android =

Japanese visual kei punk rock band

- Origin: Kanagawa, Japan
- Genres: Punk rock
- Years active: 1995–1996; 1998–2017; 2025–present
- Label: Art Pop Entertainment
- Members: Yu-Dai; Junro; Toru
- Past members: Yoshitaka; Masa; Tomo; Baku; Azumi
- Website: sex-android.org
- Logo

Sex-Android (stylized as SEX-ANDROID) is a Japanese visual kei punk rock band founded in 1995.

== History ==
The band was formed in June 1995 in Kanagawa Prefecture with vocalist Yu-Dai, guitarist Yoshitaka, bassist Junro, and drummer Masa. In the years that followed, Sex-Android went through several line-up changes. They released their first, self-titled mini-album in October 1995 and unsuccessfully auditioned for record label companies. In 1996, the band's members moved on to pursue other musical projects, and Sex-Android went on its first hiatus.

Sex-Android resumed activity in 1998 with Yu-Dai, Yoshitaka, and supportive members Hiko on bass and Masa on drums. In 1999, the band released a demo titled Hatsujouki. Bassist Hiko and drummer Masa were replaced by Tomo and Azumi. In December 1999, Sex-Android released their first full-length album, Shirimetsuretsu. Baku joined the band in place of Azumi.

In 2000, Sex-Android won a prize at the Kagayake! Songura Tengoku music programme of TV Tokyo, and their songs started being featured on compilation albums. This exposure resulted in former Last Ball Panic guitarist Toru joining the band in 2001 as a bassist. He changed his role to guitarist after Yoshitaka and Baku departed.

Since January 2003, Sex-Android's line-up consisted of vocalist Yu-Dai, guitarist Toru, and bassist Junro, with the addition of supporting drummers. In 2004, the band was signed to Art Pop Entertainment, and in 2008, they released their second album, titled Ochanoma Killer. They also released a series of singles. The "Himegoto" single (2009) topped Oricon's weekly Indies Singles chart, and "Kiratteyo, Monamour" (2011) debuted at No. 7. Their third album, Heisei kotonakare shugi!, was released in 2009. The fourth Sex-Android album, The White Rock ‘n Roll Swindle, released in 2011, was ranked No. 4 on Oricon's weekly Indies Albums chart.

Sex-Android's fifth album, Gyaku Synthesizer!! was released in 2013. In 2016, the band released an album titled Creamy Screaming!!. Sex-Android went on an indefinite hiatus after a concert at the Nakano Sun Plaza Hall on July 19, 2017. In 2019, Toru became one of the founding members of a band named Roman Kyouko. In 2025, Sex-Android resumed activities and held several concerts, including one at KT Zepp Yokohama.

== Artistry ==
Representatives of the "iryou kei" (医療系; lit. 'medical treatment style') subgenre of visual kei, the band's members dress in doctors' uniforms and use medical accessories, such as stethoscopes. During live shows, vocalist Yu-Dai uses a megaphone instead of a microphone.

Sex-Android members define their music as "isha rock" (医者ロック; lit. 'doctor rock'). Influenced by the Sex Pistols, the band initially performed music typical of punk groups. After guitarist Toru joined, the band started including elements characteristic of jazz and pop in their songs. Toru is the band's primary composer, while Yu-Dai is the main lyricist.

The band's name is often abbreviated as Sekuan. Their mascot is a pink rabbit wrapped in a nappy with brass knuckles. Sex-Android's promotional music videos feature comedic storylines and guest appearances of members of other bands.

Musicians influenced or inspired by Sex-Android include Hikari Shiina.

== Members ==
Current members

- Yu-Dai – vocals (1995–present)
- Junro – bass (1995–1996, 2003–present)
- Toru (Tφru) – guitars, bass (2001–present)

Former members

- Yoshitaka (initially known as Sonobe) – guitars (1995–2001)
- Masa – drums (1995–1996, 1996–1998)
- Akira (智) – bass (1998–2000)
- Azumi (阿純) – drums (1998–2000)
- Baku (爆) – drums (2000–2001)
- Shimura – bass (2000–2001)

Support members

- Komachi (小町) – bass (1996)
- Umeki (梅木) – drums (1996)
- Hiko – bass (1998)
- Saco – bass (2001–2002)
- Seiji – drums (2001–2004)
- Kentarou (ケンタロウ) – drums (2005)
- Haruki (ハルキ) – drums (2008)

== Discography ==
Studio albums

- Shirimetsuretsu (1999)
- Ochanoma Killer (2008)
- Heisei kotonakare shugi! (2009)
- The White Rock ‘n Roll Swindle (2011)
- Gyaku Synthesizer!! (2013)
- Creamy Screaming!! (2016)
