= The Riotts. =

Japanese visual kei rock band

the Riotts.
- Also known as: Milky Way
- Origin: Japan
- Genre: Pop rock
- Years active: 2009–2011
- Members: Sechi; Tara (たら); Kasumi (楓栖); Ayumu (歩)
- Past members: Buu (ぶう); Tetsu; Mike (ミケ)
- Website: Official website

The Riotts. (ライオット, stylized as the Riotts.) was a Japanese visual kei rock band who officially formed in November 2009, but first started activities in May as a session band called Milky Way (みるきーうぇい). The three official members; Setsuki, Tara, and Kasumi, use various "guest" musicians.

== History ==
In March 2009 176BIZ disbanded, in May a session band called Milky Way was formed by former members Setsuki (ex-Karen), Tara (ex-Panic Channel) and Kasumi (ex-Gimmick). They played their first live on July 10 at the Takada no Baba Area. In November they became an official band, known as The Riotts. Their official homepage was opened on November 21, 2009. Currently The Riotts. have no official vocalist, but used Mike (Blu-Billion) as a guest vocalist until the release of their first mini-album, StarInvitation.

== Members ==
=== Current members ===
- Sechi (formerly called Setsuki [雪希]) - guitar
- Tara (たら) - bass
- Kasumi (楓栖) - drums
- Ayumu (歩) - guest vocals

=== Former guest members ===
- Buu (ぶう) - vocals (Ensoku)
- Tetsu - guitar (ex-Gimmick)
- Mike (ミケ) - vocals (Blu-Billion)

== Discography ==
=== Albums ===
- Riot Star (2011.01.26)

=== Mini-Albums ===
- StarInvitation (2010.01.15)
- Hoshi Renge (星蓮花; "Lotus Flower Star", 2010.10.06)

=== Singles ===
- "Stargazer" (スターゲイザー, 2010.05.26)
