= Core the Child =

Japanese rock/metal band

- Origin: Japan
- Genres: Alternative metal
- Years active: 2004–2006
- Label: Independent
- Members: Yuuki; Yuu; Shunsuke; Shou
- Past members: Ryou; Tomoji

Core the Child (typeset as CoЯe The Child) was a Japanese visual kei rock/metal band formed in 2004, and was predecessor to the successful visual kei bands vistlip and Unsraw. They disbanded in 2006.

== Biography ==
Core the Child was formed in June 2004 by Yuuki, Ryou, Shunsuke and Shou. However, shortly after forming, guitarist Ryou decided to leave the band and the band recruited Tomoji as their new guitarist. After playing live shows for a while, they released their first single in September. In January 2005, Tomoji also decided to leave, which left Core the Child without a guitarist once again. However, this did not end activity; they released their first EP, Distribe, in March.

After the release of their EP, they discovered another guitarist, Yuu. In 2006, they distributed three singles for promotional purposes, but on April 18, they officially disbanded. Some members becoming inactive; others started new careers in the music industry. Vocalist Yuuki and drummer Shou started their new project, Unsraw, a few months later. Guitarist Yuu and bassist Shunsuke joined the band Jessica, which disbanded as well in 2007. Shunsuke is currently in the band vistlip, where he is now known as "Rui".

== Members ==
- Yuuki (勇企) – vocals, piano, programming (2004–2006), guitar (studio only)
- Yuu (悠) – guitar (2005–2006)
- Shunsuke (俊介) – bass guitar (2004–2006)
- Shou (匠) – drums (2004–2006)

Former members

- Ryou (リョウ) – guitar (2004)
- Tomoji (友治) – guitar (2004–2005)

== Discography ==
Extended plays

- Distribe (March 21, 2005, self-released)

Singles

- "Ground Zero/Good-Bye" (September 11, 2004, self-released)
- "Depression" (March 21, 2005, self-released, promo at live shows)
- "Chototsumoushin Vol.1" (『猪突猛進』Vol.1) (January 26, 2006, self-released)
- "Chototsumoushin Vol.2" (『猪突猛進』Vol.2) (February 23, 2006, self-released)
- "Chototsumoushin Vol.3" (『猪突猛進』Vol.3) (March 29, 2006, self-released)

Compilations

- Resident of Delusion (July 27, 2005, Relative+Heart Records)
  - (with the track “Flow-er-”)
