= XTripx =

Japanese visual kei rock band

xTRiPx
- Origin: Fukuoka, Japan
- Genres: Rock
- Years active: 2003–2015
- Labels: SPEED DISK
- Members: 弥斗(Yoshito); K ena
- Past members: るっち(Rucchi) ゆきね(Yukine) 将吾(Shougo) ちょび(Chobi)
- Website: www.xtripx.com

xTRiPx (prev. name ×トリップ×) was a Japanese indie visual kei rock band. Their first live performance was in October 2003, and June 2005 saw the release of their first mini-album 『トウメイ。』 (Tōmei). They disbanded after their one-man live performance in February 2015.

== Line-up ==
=== Current members ===
- Vocals: 弥斗 (Yoshito)
- Guitar: K
- Drums: ena

=== Ex-members ===
- Bass: るっち (Rucchi) (returned once to the band and left again on 8 April 2010)
- Bass: ゆきね (Yukine) (ex-member of Mist qruel and リンダ; left band on 21 September 2008)
- Guitar: 将吾 (Shougo) (ex-member of リンダ; left band on 21 July 2011)
- Bass: ちょび (Chobi) (left band on 21 July 2011)

== History ==
Originally from Fukuoka, the band has successfully completed several tours since their inception, but 2007 saw a number of changes for the band. Yukine departed xTRiPx due to his personal differences in music. He continued to play with the band up until September 21, when he left for good. By 1 October 2007, Rucchi, their previous bassist returned to their line-up.

In 2009 they released their first song after the reunion entitled, "Dream Catcher", which was specially limited to 100 copies and sold at their free show on New Year's Eve. They released a single together entitled, [-Re:evolutioN-]. In April 2009, xTRiPx decided to pack up and head to Tokyo for seek better opportunities for their music.

On 3 February 2010, they released their maxi-single titled "Innovation[Re]Ism", which reached #189 on the Oricon singles chart. It reached #7 on the Oricon Indies Singles chart. Another single, "Disturb[da]bordeR (TYPE B)", was released on 30 March 2011 and peaked at #130 on the Oricon chart.

On 10 May 2011, they announced that Chobi and Shougo were leaving due to musical differences after their concert at Takadanobaba AREA on July 21. The band went on hiatus immediately after that. On 9 April 2012, xTRiPx announced a revival concert that took place on 21 July 2012 at Takadanobaba AREA. At the concert, the limited single "Rest in Peace" and complementary one-coin single "Re;lily" were released.

It has recently been announced that xTRiPx is going through a "reboot" prompted by their 10-year anniversary in July 2013 with the release of full album, Any Verse, and a concert at Takadanobaba AREA on 13 July 2013.

On August 20th. 2025, vocalist Yo-shiT died due to ischemic artery disease at the age of 42.

== Disbandment ==
At the end of 2014, XTripx announced that they will disband after 11 years of activity. Ena cited that the members felt that they had reached their limit as a band. Throughout the band's lifespan, they had struggled with their lineup and never broke out of the indie scene. In spite of their struggles, they thank their fans and announced that their last live performance will take place at Fukuoka.

At Fukuoka DRUM SON on February 13, 2015, XTRiPx disbanded after their oneman live, "1 as there..."]. Their last live-limited single "good trip" was released at their one-man live "good trip" at Takadanobaba AREA on February 8 and their last one-man live on February 13.
