= The Piass =

Japanese visual kei hardcore punk band

- Also known as: 妃阿甦 (1999–present)
- Origin: Sapporo, Japan
- Genre: Hardcore punk • crossover thrash • thrashcore • death rock • death metal • metalcore • crust punk
- Years active: 1990–1995, 1998–present
- Members: Takayuki; Thifu; Toro
- Past members: Takashi; Chihiro; Hiroshi; Yoshio; Kirala; Ruiji; Shizuki; Tetsuya; Tsubaki Yunosuke; Tenteke
- Website: Official site

The Piass (THE妃阿甦, za piasu) are a Japanese visual kei hardcore punk band formed in the early 1990s in Sapporo. Three of the four original members died within a span of two years, however Takayuki continued the band, having gone through many line-up changes, and they are still active to this day.

== History ==
The Piass was formed in 1990 by vocalist Chihiro, guitarist Takayuki, bassist Yoshio and drummer Hiroshi. After a while Chihiro left the band and was replaced by Takashi, who didn't stay long, only providing vocals for their first release. Chihiro returned and this formation became noticed in the music scene.

In February 1993, The Piass' first omnibus album appearance Braintrash was released; it also contained a song by Malice Mizer. Their next few songs ended up being released on many different omnibus albums through Anarchist Records, the label with which they signed their first contract. Two years after, they released their first album, Ryouki Kousatsu Chissoku-Shi, which almost reached the top ten of the Oricon indies charts.

Everything was going well for the young band until the October 25, 1995, which marked the end of band activities for a time. Chihiro and Hiroshi died after falling from a twenty meter high bridge during a PV shoot that day. Their deaths became a mystery with many different versions. Some believe that it was a suicide pact, as the two were tied together when they fell. However, it is usually deemed an accident because of the stunt they had wanted to perform for the PV. Although the band was naturally on hiatus at the time in 1996, Anarchist Records still released another two songs by The Piass.

In the year 1997, Yoshio committed suicide, leaving Takayuki as the sole living member. The reasons are unknown, once again fueling different speculations.

On October 25, 1998, exactly three years after the first tragedy, Takayuki began to rebuild the band. The new members were the former Slum Junkie vocalist Kirala, Ruiji (ex-Mazohysteria) became bassist and the lineup was completed by Shizuki as drummer. The band published their second demo tape in 1999, and changed the spelling of their name. The Piass now written in Japanese, 妃阿甦, the last kanji meaning "resurrection".

In 1999 The Piass released their second album, a self-titled effort which would prove to be a huge departure from their original sound; the group now had a frantic punk rock sound opposed to the more hard rock sound of the previous album. An EP was recorded the following year, Gekka Kyoushou. They released a single in 2001 called "Akinazuna: Akina Zuna".

2002 Kirala disappeared for a while in February and then officially left the band on the third of March. Guitarist Takayuki became the new vocalist of the trio. During this same time period, Takayuki was active as the guitarist for Anti Feminism's releases as well. After this lineup change, The Piass stopped all of its own music releases and only released music on the omnibus album Anarchist Records IV published in May 2002. From this point on, they became a live-only band, and Takayuki continued to work more with Anti Feminism.

The new single after four years was finally released on May 24, 2006, and called "Kansen Shou Paranoia"; it included a DVD clip. In November 2006, their first DVD Shiiku Mousou was released, containing a small collection of PVs.

In February 2007, the official website announced the addition of new vocalist Tetsuya, and Takayuki returned to guitarist. However, in March 2007, before they could even perform one live, bassist Ruiji and drummer Shizuki left the band, stating musical differences. The band continued on with Tetsuya and Takayuki as the official members and made use of support members for the rest of 2007 and 2008. The duo released a mini-album in August 2007 called Dolei: Dorei.

On October 8, 2008, vocalist Tetsuya did not perform at their live show. Takayuki had said at the live that “Tetsuya can’t come on stage now”, but nothing more insightful.

In 2009, The Piass transformed into a five-member band, gaining four new members and announcing two coupling tours to start off the year. Joining The Piass were guitarists Thifu and Tsubaki, bassist Tenteke and drummer Toro. The first tour of the year, GaixTokkanxNippon Angya Tour: Zenhansen, begins in March, and the second tour of the year, beginning in April, is called GaixTokkanxNippon Angya Tour: Kouhansen.

== Members ==
- Takayuki – guitar (1990–2008); vocals (2002–2007, 2009–present)
- Thifu – guitar (2009–present)
- Toro – drums (2009–present)

Former members

- Takashi – vocals (1993)
- Chihiro – vocals (1990–1995, died 1995)
- Hiroshi – drums (1990–1995, died 1995)
- Yoshio – bass (1990–1997, died 1997)
- Kirala – vocals (1998–2002)
- Tetsuya – vocals (2006-2008)
- Ruiji – bass (1998–2007)
- Shizuki – drums (1998–2007)
- Tetsuya – vocals (2007–2008)
- Takahiro – bass (2007–2008) (support member)
- Junji Tokai – drums (2007–2008) (support member)
- Tsubaki Yunosuke – guitar (2009–2011)
- Tenteke – bass (2009–2015)

== Discography ==
Albums

- Ryouki Kousatsu Chissoku-Shi (1995)
- Piass (1999)

EPs

- Geki ka kyosa (2000)
- Dolei (2007)
- Dolei: 2ndPress (2007)

Singles

- "Easy Trick" (2000)
- "Discrimination" (2001)
- "Despair" (2001)
- "Akinazuna: Akinazuna" (2001)
- "Kansensho Paranoia" (2006)

DVDs

- Shiikumousou (2006)
- Shiikumousou+kansensyoParanoia (2007)
- SM (2008)

VHS

- Haiteki: Fuyuubyou (2000)

Demos

- "The Piass" (1993)
- "Fat Fetishism" (1999)
