= Anti Feminism =

Japanese crossover thrash band

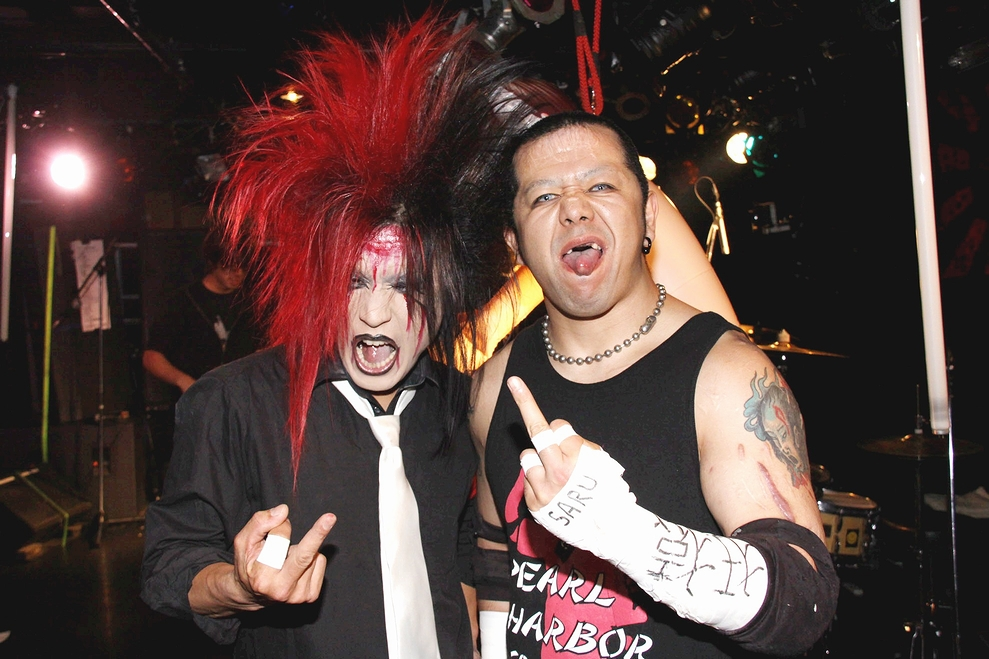
- Drummer Shizuki (left) in 2009 with Jun Kasai

Background information
- Origin: Japan
- Genres: Crossover thrash
- Years active: 1991–1993; 1998–present
- Labels: Anarchist; Wow Rock
- Members: Kenzi; Shogo; Ruiji; Shizuki
- Website: www.anti655321feminism.jp
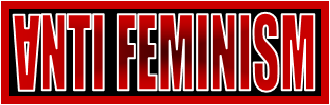

Anti Feminism (stylized as ∀NTI FEMINISM) is the Japanese crossover thrash solo musical project started by vocalist Kenzi in 1991. None of the other members are considered official. The rotating supporting members come from various parts of Japan, including Tokyo, Osaka, Sapporo, Fukuoka, and Nagoya. In 2007, Anti Feminism toured through Europe and the U.S. with Hagakure.

== History ==
Kenzi, (ex-Kamaitachi, The Dead Pop Stars), started the project in 1991 and continued for only a few years. In 1998, Kenzi worked together with Takayuki of The Piass to revive the project. By 2006, there had been more than fifty different members. Several well-known musicians of the visual kei scene have participated, including Kisaki (Phantasmagoria, Syndrome, Mirage, etc.), Katsura (Shazna, Baiser, Vinett, etc.) and Hideaki (Das Vasser).

A noteworthy detail of Anti Feminism is Kenzi's antics at live performances. During shows, he has set off fireworks, set himself on fire, broken fluorescent light bulbs over his head, jumped onto a board covered in barbed wire, and done various other extreme stunts, consistently injuring himself and calling for hospitalization. This is highlighted at Anti Feminism's official site, with the section "Mad Performance".

Kenzi affectionately refers to fans of Anti Feminism as "Mad Family".

== Members ==
- Kenzi – vocals (drummer of The Dead Pop Stars, ex-drummer of Kamaitachi)
- Shogo – guitar
- Ruiji – bass (ex-The Piass, The Dead Pop Stars)
- Shizuki – drums (ex-The Piass)

== Discography ==
=== Albums and mini-albums ===
- Kyohan Sabetsu Hinichijouteki (December 2003)
- Kyousouroku (June 2008)
- Nihon wa Shizumu (May 2010)
- ∀NTI DAMASHII (April 2016)

=== Singles and maxi-singles ===
- "15-Sai" (June 2008)
- "Malicious Power" (June 2011)

=== Demos ===
- "Kami ga Ataeta Futsuu de Nai Mono e no Shuudanteki Kakushinhan" (May 2003)
- "Mujouken Koufuku Suru ka, Nou ka" (July 2002)
- "To Sick People: Boku wa Genki ni Shindemasu" (June 2001)
- "Majime na Ningen wa Shinubeki de Aru (First Press)" (July 2000)
- "Majime na Ningen wa Shinubeki de Aru" (July 2000)
- "Japanese No" (June 1999)
