= Deviloof =

Japanese visual kei deathcore band

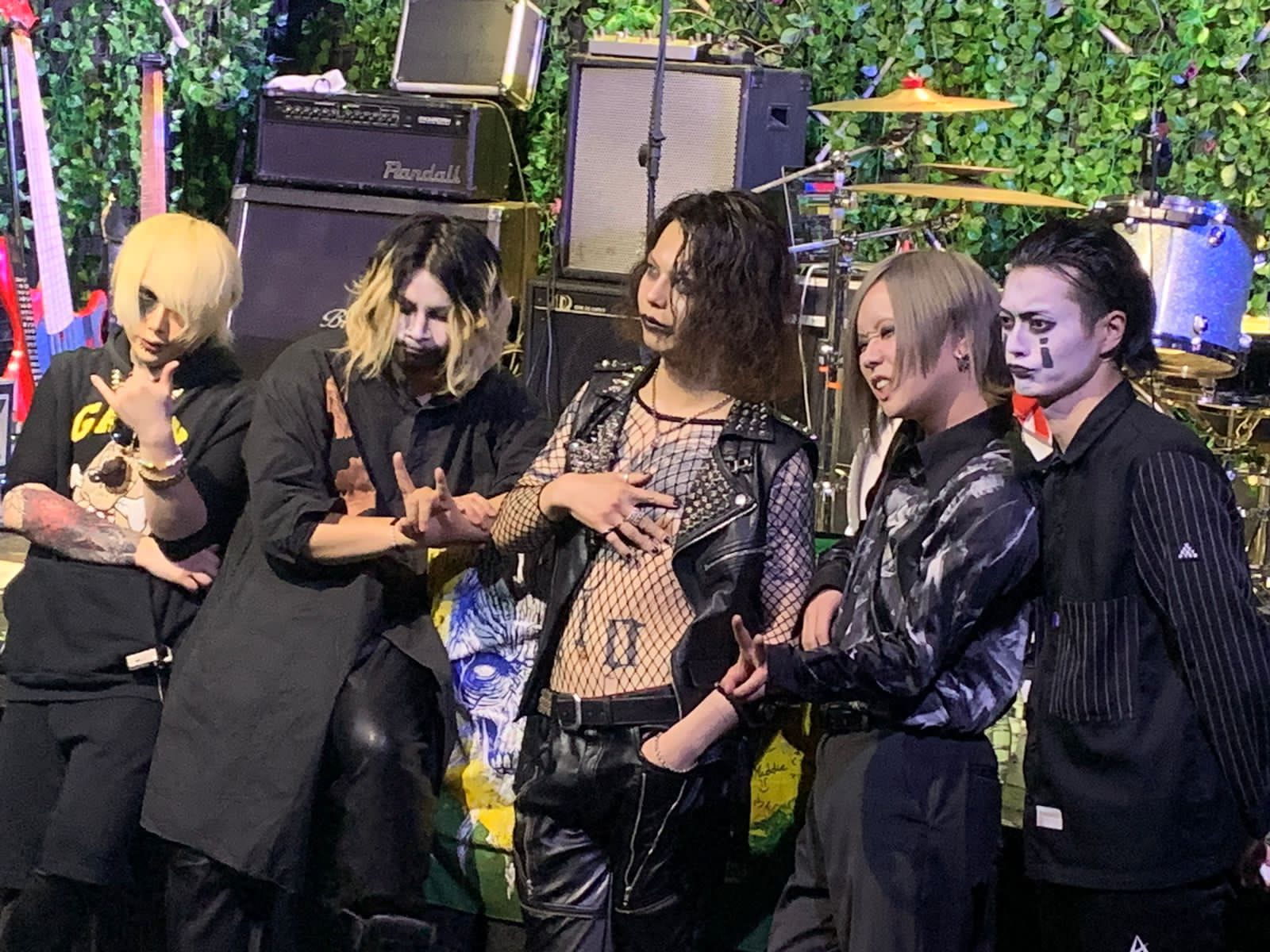
- Deviloof in São Paulo, Brazil, in 2024.

Background information
- Origin: Osaka, Japan
- Genre: Deathcore
- Years active: 2015–present
- Labels: 9th Records; Devil's Proof Records; Tokuma Japan Communications; Universal Music Japan
- Members: Keisuke; Ray; Daiki; Nao
- Past members: Ryuya; Seiya; Hiroto; Aisaku; Kanta
- Website: deviloof.ryzm.jp

Deviloof is a Japanese visual kei deathcore band formed in 2015. It has a reputation for being the "fastest and cruelest" in the scene and has attracted attention not only in Japan but worldwide.

== History ==
=== Early years and GouZinZanGoku (2015-2020) ===
Deviloof was formed on 12 December 2015 by vocalist Keisuke, bassist Daiki and drummer Hiroto who were former members of another group called All Must Die.

The band has a visual style sometimes described as "flashy and super aggressive", in which they call themselves "the most violent and extreme band in Visual Kei".

On 1 October 2015, the music video for their first single, "Ruin", was released ahead of the group's official debut. It attracted attention not only from Japan but also from around the world.

In 2016, they participated in Metal Battle Global, which earned them a spot at the world's largest metal festival, Wacken Open Air, advancing to the final round. On 31 August of the same year, they released their first mini-album, "PURGE". It reached No. 12 on the Oricon Indies Chart, achieving unprecedented sales for music of this genre.

On 27 April 2017, the band announced that they would take a temporary hiatus after their performance at Meguro Rokumeikan on 3 May. The group welcomed new members and resumed activities on 1 October. Their first full album, "Devil’s Proof", was set for release on 15 November. The band also introduced a new logo designed by Toshihiro Egawa.

In January 2018, the band announced a deal with 9thRecords, a subsidiary of DANGER CRUE.

In October 2018, some members left the band, and a new lineup was introduced in March 2019.

On 23 May 2019, downloads and streaming of works other than "Ishtar" became available. On 19 June, they released their second full album, "Oni", which features a Japanese theme. A solo tour and a European tour were also planned to accompany the release. In 2019, the band's release of GouZinZanGoku attracted attention of international fans.

On 12 July 2020, due to the impact of COVID-19, the band's spring European tour and summer domestic solo tour were postponed. Asking themselves, "Is there something we can offer our listeners worldwide?", they decided to hold their first audience-free live-streamed concert, titled "I HATE COVID-19". On 22 July of the same year, they also released the double A-side single "Devil's Calling/Angel's Cry", originally scheduled for a March release and available only by mail order. Notably, Ray is the lead vocalist on "Angel’s Cry", and RYOJI of GYZE was responsible for the guitar solo and orchestral arrangement.

=== Dystopia, DAMNED, Inshu and line-up changes (2021-2025) ===
On 28 August 2021, they appeared on Nippon Television's program "Ariyoshi Hanseikai."

On 17 December 2021, the band's third album, "DYSTOPIA", released on 8 December, ranked No. 1 on both the iTunes Japan Metal Chart and the Apple Music Japan Metal Chart.

On 16 December 2022, it was announced that they would make their major debut in the spring of 2023 under Tokuma Japan Communications.

On 10 February 2023, the release date of their major debut single EP "DAMNED" was postponed due to Keisuke's (桂佑) chronic pharyngitis. However, the music video for "Damn" from the same EP has been released.

In December 2022, Deviloof announced that they were signing with a major label, Tokuma. Their first release under the label was the Damned EP released on 19 April 2023. Speaking about the EP in a video, Keisuke said that the band was preparing a world tour for 2023. In July it was announced that they would play three shows in Latin America in 2024: on 25 May in Mexico, on 31 May in Chile and on 2 June in Brazil. It was announced on 14 September 2024 that Aisaku left the band on 31 August due to differences in direction regarding the band.

In 2025, it was announced that Kanta would depart from Deviloof in December of that year following the conclusion of the band's European tour.

=== Universal Music and Gamurou (2026-present) ===
Nao joined Deviloof as the new drummer in January 2026. Deviloof supported the American deathcore band Enterprise Earth's tours in China in June and in Japan in July 2026.

In September 2026, the band signed a new deal with Universal Music Japan (Virgin Music) and their digital single 我夢牢/GAMUROU was released on 7 October. The song features the vocals of Travis Worland from Enterprise Earth.

The American deathcore band Lorna Shore toured with Deviloof in Japan and Taiwan in October 2026.

== Band name ==
The name Deviloof comes from the phrase devil's proof. Vocalist Keisuke said in an interview that they created the word Deviloof and that it means an omittance of the devil's proof. They chose this as it leads to the thought of a phenomenon where there is no proof that Satan showed to Christ. It leads to a very mysterious feel, something beyond what is easy to understand.

== Musical style and influences ==
Deviloof has been referred to as a deathcore band. They have been called "the most brutal band in visual kei" due to their flashy and violent visuals, fast riffs, double-pedal drums, blast beats, and guttural vocals.

Deviloof has strong influences from Japanese visual kei bands such as X Japan and Dir En Grey, while vocalist Keisuke also cites Megadeth and Elvis Presley as influences. Some of the senior Japanese rock bands influenced Deviloof to embrace the visual kei look, and for Keisuke, these influences come from his great respect for X Japan and Dir En Grey who, in his words, "We are Japanese and would like to follow them."

== Members ==
Current members

- Keisuke – vocals (2015–present)
- Ray – guitar & vocals (2017–present)
- Daiki – bass (2015–present)
- Nao - drums (2026-present)

Former members

- Ryuya – guitar (2015–2016)
- Seiya – guitar (2015–2018)
- Hiroto – drums (2015–2018)
- Aisaku – guitar (2018–2024)
- Kanta - drums (2018-2025)

== Discography ==
Albums

- Devil's Proof (2017)
- Oni (2019)
- Dystopia (2021)

Mini-albums

- Purge (2016)
- Damned (2023)
- Song For The Weak (2024)

Singles

- "Ruin" (6 December 2015)
- "Ishtar" (1 April 2016)
- "Flowering" (25 April 2018)
- "Devil's Calling"/"Angel's Cry" (22 July 2020)
- "Mob Rule" (24 March 2021)
- "Newspeak" (23 April 2021)
- "Everything is all lies" (20 October 2023)
- "Inshu"『因習』(29 January 2025)
- "GAMUROU"『我夢牢』 (7 October 2026)
