= Kamaitachi (band) =

Japanese visual kei punk rock band

- Kamaitachi in 1989; Clockwise from top-left: Sceana, Kazzy, Mogwai, Ken-chan

Background information
- Also known as: Mogura
- Origin: Kyoto, Japan
- Genres: Punk rock; hardcore punk
- Years active: 1985–1991; 2015; 2016; 2017
- Labels: Free-Will; Toy's Factory
- Members: Ken-chan; Mogwai; Sceana
- Past members: Kazuo; Wataru; P-Ken; Shinobu; Andy; Madoka; Kazzy
- Website: hachamechakyo.com

Kamaitachi (かまいたち) was a Japanese visual kei punk rock band, formed in Kyoto and active from 1985 to 1991. Their album Hachamecha Kyou reached number 10 on the Oricon chart and was named one of the top albums from 1989 to 1998 in a 2004 issue of the music magazine Band Yarouze. They have performed several times since reuniting for a one-off performance in 2015.

== History ==
Kamaitachi was formed in October 1985 by drummer Ken-chan and bassist Mogwai. They reportedly took their name from an encyclopedia of yōkai; presumably the entry for the creature of the same name. The band gave outlandish live performances that often saw them banned from live houses. After several member changes, vocalist Sceana and guitarist Kazzy joined completing the final lineup. Kazzy was originally a bassist, but switched to guitar in order to play with Kamaitachi and they started recording their first album three months later. The band signed with Free-Will in 1989 and released their debut album, Itachigokko, in September. The album sold out by pre-orders alone, so a second press was released the following year under the title Super Itachigokko.

Also in 1990, the band signed to Toy's Factory and in September released their major debut, Hachamecha Kyou. They released their third album, Jekyll to Hyde -Masturbation-, on June 1, 1991. However, at a June 26 concert they announced they would disband after their last concert on September 6, 1991, for unknown reasons. Later that month a single and a compilation album, both titled "I Love You", were released to fulfill their contract.

After disbanding, Ken-chan started using the stagename "Kenzi" and started the band The Dead Pop Stars and the long-running hardcore punk act Anti Feminism. Sceana and Kazzy formed the industrial rock duo Genkaku Allergy, while Mogwai performs in the punk band Flesh for Flankenstein.

To celebrate the 30th anniversary of his musical activities, Kenzi held a special concert on October 12, 2015 at Shinjuku Blaze. Kenzi, Sceana, and Mogwai performed four songs as Kamaitachi with guest guitarist Sheja. They reunited again to perform on the first day of the Visual Japan Summit on October 14, 2016 at Makuhari Messe. They then performed two more shows, a one-man live at Shinjuku Loft on January 14, 2017 and a show at Kyoto Muse on April 1, before playing a final concert at Akasaka Blitz on August 5.

== Influences ==
Ken-chan and Mogwai first became interested in rock music because of Yellow Magic Orchestra, but both said they could not afford synthesizers. Ken-chan was influenced by The Stalin to put on wild stage shows in order to stand out. He admired the double bass drumming of Cozy Powell and, as of mid-1990, had recently come to admire Rikki Rockett of Poison for his showmanship. Mogwai cited Gene Simmons of Kiss as his favorite bassist. Sceana had always liked thrash metal, such as "I'll Kill You"-era X, and expressed admiration for X guitarist Hide and D'erlanger guitarist Cipher due to their stage presences. Kazzy started playing bass because of Sid Vicious and Nikki Sixx, but cited guitarists Jun Shimoyama of The Roosters and Cipher as some of his favorite artists as of mid-1990.

== Members ==
- Crazy Danger Nancy Ken-chan/Kenzi – drums 1985–1991, 2015, 2016, 2017 (Sister's No Future, Anti Feminism, The Dead Pop Stars)
- Mogwai (モグワイ) – bass 1985–1991, 2015, 2016, 2017 (Alucard, Flesh For Flankenstein)
- Sceana – vocals 1987–1991, 2015, 2016, 2017 (Genkaku Allergy, Octopus Cult, Alien9Ball, The Splatters)

Former members

- Kazuo (カズオ) – vocals 1985
- Wataru (ワタル) – guitar 1985, vocals 1986
- P-Ken – guitar 1986
- Shinobu – vocals 1986
- Andy – guitar 1987 (Decameron)
- Madoka – guitar 1988
- Kazzy – guitar 1989–1991 (ex-Decameron, Genkaku Allergy)

== Discography ==
Demo tapes

- "Shimensoka" (四面楚歌; October 1985)
- "Hyakkiyagyou" (百鬼夜行; 1986)
- "Chou Kanju" (聴姦濡々; June 1987)
- "Batsu Shugi" (罰主義; May 1988)
- "Jakunikukyoushoku Tape" (弱肉強食TAPE; March 6, 1989)

Singles

- "Hachamecha Hime" (はちゃめちゃ姫; February 5, 1990), Oricon Singles Chart Peak Position: No. 14

Theme song for Tsuru Hime ja - tsu! (つる姫じゃ〜っ!) anime.

- "I Love You" (December 21, 1991) No. 84

Albums

- Itachigokko (いたちごっこ; September 10, 1989)
- Super Itachigokko (スーパーいたちごっこ; 1990)

Second pressing of their debut album.

- Hachamecha Kyou (はちゃめちゃ狂; September 21, 1990), Oricon Albums Chart Peak Position: No. 10
- Jekyll to Hyde -Masturbation- (June 21, 1991) No. 15
- I Love You (September 21, 1991, compilation album) No. 24

Compilations

- Emergency Express Metal Warning 2 (1989, "Kill Yourself")

Videos

- Plus Minus Zero (プラスマイナスゼロ; September 1986)
- Doku Batsu Shikan (独罰視姦; May 1989)
- Kyouran Butou Kamachi Kyouto ni Kaeru (狂乱舞踏 かまち京都にカエル; May 21, 1990)
- No More Heroes (November 21, 1991)
- Kamaitachi Saishū Kōen: The End (かまいたち最終公演「THE END」; December 20, 2017), Oricon DVDs Chart Peak Position: No. 110
