= Nocturnal Bloodlust =

Japanese metalcore/deathcore band

- Origin: Tokyo, Japan
- Genres: Metalcore; deathcore; electronicore
- Years active: 2009-present
- Labels: RAIZ ENTERTAINMENT (2012); IRIS & CRISIS (2013-2019); Maverick (2019-present)
- Members: Hiro; Masa; Natsu; Yu-taro; Valtz
- Past members: Lin; Cazqui; Daichi; Junpei; Gaku
- Website: www.nocturnalbloodlust.com

Nocturnal Bloodlust (Japanese: ノクターナル・ブラッドラスト, Hepburn: Nokutānaru Buraddorasuto), sometimes abbreviated as NOKUBURA (ノクブラ), is a Japanese metalcore/deathcore band formed in Tokyo in 2009. They started to incorporate visual kei aesthetics into their appearance in 2012.

== History ==
Nocturnal Bloodlust was formed in 2009 and played their first show in Shinjuku. They gained popularity soon after and performed in music festivals such as the Bloodaxe Festival in Japan. In 2012, the band decided to incorporate more visual kei styles into their music and performances, and released a two-part single, Voices of the Apocalypse -sins- and Voices of the Apocalypse -virtues-.

In 2013, the band released their first album, GRIMOIRE, after years of only releasing EPs and singles. This was followed up by three more consecutive single releases in March, April, and May 2014 before releasing their second album, THE OMNIGOD, later that year in December.

Nocturnal Bloodlust only performed in Japan until 2016, when they held their first show abroad for the first time in Shanghai, China. Later that year they also made their debut in Europe, holding shows in the United Kingdom, France, Netherlands, Germany, and Hungary. In 2017, Nocturnal Bloodlust released a best-of album containing a selection of songs from their history, as well as new ones, before doing a short Asia tour to Hong Kong and Taiwan.

In October 2018, the guitarists Cazqui and Daichi announced their departure from the band, with their last live show scheduled for December 2018. The announcement came following their expressed disappointment in staff mishandling their band revenue.

In 2020, the band released three standalone singles: "Life is Once", "ONLY HUMAN" and "Reviver". Following these singles, the band announced the mini-album The Wasteland, which was released on December 16, in tandem with the reveal of their new guitarists Valtz (a.k.a. Meku ex-GALEYD) and Yu-taro (A Ghost of Flare).

On September 13, 2025, Nocturnal Bloodlust was the headliner for the metal concert Pulse vol. 1. The concert, held in at Shinjuku Antiknock, was organised by JRock News and celebrated the 10th anniversary of the Japanese rock news website. A total of six bands played, with Nocturnal Bloodlust being the final act.

== Style ==
Nocturnal Bloodlust is known for incorporating a variety of styles and different musical elements into their songs. For the three month campaign in 2014, they released three songs that showcase different styles. The first, Strike in Fact, incorporates elements of nu metal. The second release, Desperate, is an extremely dark and fast song which showcases the heavier side of the band. The third song, Libra, is a lighter song that employs elements from ballads. Other songs, such as Triangle Carnage, Providence, and their newest release, (2023) Kingdom include funk and jazz elements as well.

As with many visual kei bands, the members frequently change their clothing and aesthetical style to fit the artistic style of their latest releases.

== Members ==
- Hiro - vocals (2009-present)
- Masa - bass (2009-present)
- Natsu - drums (2011-present)
- Valtz - guitars (2020-present)
- Yu-taro - guitars (2020-present)

=== Former members ===
- Junpei - guitars (2009-2011)
- Gaku Taura - drums (2009-2011)
- Cazqui - guitars (2009-2018)
- Daichi - guitars (2013-2018)
- Lin - guitars (2019)

== Discography ==
=== Albums ===
- Grimoire (2013)
- The Omnigod (2014)
- The Best '09–'17 (2017)
- Argos (2022)

=== EPs ===
- Ivy (2012)
- Omega (2013)
- ZēTēS (2016)
- Whiteout (2018)
- Unleash (2019)
- The Wasteland (2020)

=== Singles ===
- "Voices of the Apocalypse -Virtues-" (2011)
- "Voices of the Apocalypse -Sins-" (2011)
- "Bury Me" (2012)
- "Last Relapse" (2012)
- "Obligation" (2012)
- "Disaster / Unbreakable" (2013)
- "Triangle Carnage" (2013)
- "Strike in Fact" (2014)
- "Desperate" (2014)
- "Libra" (2014)
- "Providence" (2015)
- "銃創" (2015)
- "Suicide" (2017)
- "Live to Die" (2017)
- "Whiteout" (2018)
- "Life Is Once" (2020)
- "Only Human" (2020)
- "Reviver" (2020)
- "The One" (2021)
- "Despise" (2023)
- "Kingdom" (2023)
- “Nail in the coffin” (2025)
- “Devil inside” (2025)
