= Inugami Circus-dan =

Japanese rock band

- Origin: Japan
- Genres: Hard rock; Heavy Metal; post-punk; punk rock; experimental rock; progressive rock
- Years active: 1994–present
- Labels: Wide Thread, Zetima, Kinmedai
- Members: Kyoko; Jouji II; Zin; Akira
- Website: http://www.inugami.jp

Inugami Circus-dan (犬神サーカス団) are a Japanese rock band. The band's name literally translates to The Dog-God Circus Troupe. Their costumes typically consist of the female singer wearing a kimono, and the rest of the band wearing military-style uniforms. They also wear Gothic and Kabuki style make-up.

== History ==
In 2003 they busted out their major label debut on Zetima Records, "Inochi Mijikashi Koi Seyo Jinrui!" Inugami Circus-dan covered X Japan's "Rusty Nail" for Crush! 3 - 90's V-Rock Best Hit Cover Love Songs-, which was released on June 27, 2012 and features current visual kei bands covering love songs by visual kei artists of the 90's.

== Members ==
- Inugami Kyouko - Vocals
- Inugami Jouji II - Guitar
- Inugami Zin - Bass
- Inugami Akira - Drums

== Discography ==
=== Albums ===
- Jigoku no Komoriuta (地獄の子守唄) - 1999
- Hebigami-hime (蛇神姫) - 2000
- Ankoku Zankoku Gekijou (暗黒残酷劇場) - 2001
- Kaidan! Kubitsuri no Mori (怪談 首つりの森) - 2002
- Kami no Inu (神の犬) - 2003
- Greatest Hits (グレイテスト・ヒッツ) - 2004
- Sukeban Rock (スケ番ロック) - 2005
- Kejijou no Eros (形而上のエロス) - 2006
- Kago no Tori, Tenkuu wo Shirazu (籠の鳥、天空を知らず) - Oct 7 2009
- Setakamui (セタカムイ) - May 12, 2010
- Viva! America - Oct 20, 2010
- Osorezan - 2012
- Seishonen no Tame no Inugami Nyumon - 2014
- Tamatsubaki Hime (玉椿姫) - 2014
- Koko Kara Nanika ga Hajimaru (ここから何かが始まる) - 2015
- Ougonkyou (黄金郷) - 2016
- Shinjuku Go Go (新宿ゴーゴー) - 2017
- Tokyo 2060 (東京2060) - 2018

=== Mini-Albums ===
- Goreizen (御霊前) - 1997
- Akaneko (赤猫) - 2000
- Machiwabita Hi ~ Keijijou no Eros Gaiden (待ちわびた日～形而上のエロス外伝) - 2006
- Kyoko no Kyofu no Shinya Radio: Featuring Inugami Circus Dan (凶子の恐怖の深夜ラヂヲ: Featuring 犬神サーカス団) - 2007
- Ju-ren (呪恋) - 2008
- Yakouressha Gokuraku Yuki (夜行列車極楽行) - Nov 5 2008
- Shinumade Rock - 2011
- A Nightmare of the Uncertainly Principle - 2013

=== Singles ===
- "Jinkou Ninshin Chuuzetsu" (人工妊娠中絶) - 2001
- "Saigo no Idol" (最後のアイドル) (2-track CD+18-track DVD) - 2003
- "Inochi Mijikashi Koiseyo Jinrui!" (命みぢかし恋せよ人類！) - 2003 (Oricon Ranking 78)
- "Saisho no Tobira" (最初の扉) - 2004 (Oricon Ranking 59)
- "Tsugou no Ii Onna / Honto ni Honto ni Gokurou-san" (都合のいい女・ほんとにほんとに御苦労さん) - 2004
- "Hikari to Kage no Toccata" (光と影のトッカータ) - 2007.8
- "Jigoku ni Ochita Kodomotachi" (地獄に堕ちた子供たち) - 2007.9
- "Takaramono" (たからもの) - 2007.10
- "BABYLONIA Koi Monogatari" (バビロニア恋物語) 2007.11
- "Itsuka" (いつか) 2007.12
- "Tsubasa" (翼) Apr 9, 2008
- "Sweet" Oct 8 2008
- "Koi wa Munekyun" (恋は胸きゅん) - April 8, 2009
- "Sakura Chiru Naka" - 2011

=== DVD / VHS ===
- Yoru ga Owacchimau Mae ni (夜が終っちまう前に) - 1998
- Nozoki Karaku Kyouken Shibai (覘キ絡繰狂犬芝居) - 1998
- Hakoiri Idou Circus ~Tent Sono Ichi~ (箱入り移動サアカス~テント其ノ壱~) - 2002
- Yomi no Kuni (黄泉の国) - 2003
- Sennou (洗脳) - 2003
- Chingonka ~Requiem~ (鎮魂歌～レクイエム～) - 2003
- Video Clip-Shuu - Seppuku (ビデオクリップ集・切腹) - 2004

=== Compilation / Other ===
- Akai Hebi (赤い蛇) (Akai Hebi) - 2000
- Ijou no Utage (異形の宴) (Akaasa no Shoufu [赤痣の娼婦], Enamel wo Nurareta Apollinaire [エナメルを塗られたアポリネール]) - 2000
- Ijou no Utage (異形の宴) (DVD) (Enamel wo Nurareta Apollinaire [エナメルを塗られたアポリネール]) - 2000
- Forever Young (フォーエバー・ヤング) (Takeda no Komoriuta) - 2001
- 365:TRIBUTE TO STALIN (STOP JAP) - 2001
