= Arlequin (band) =

Japanese rock band

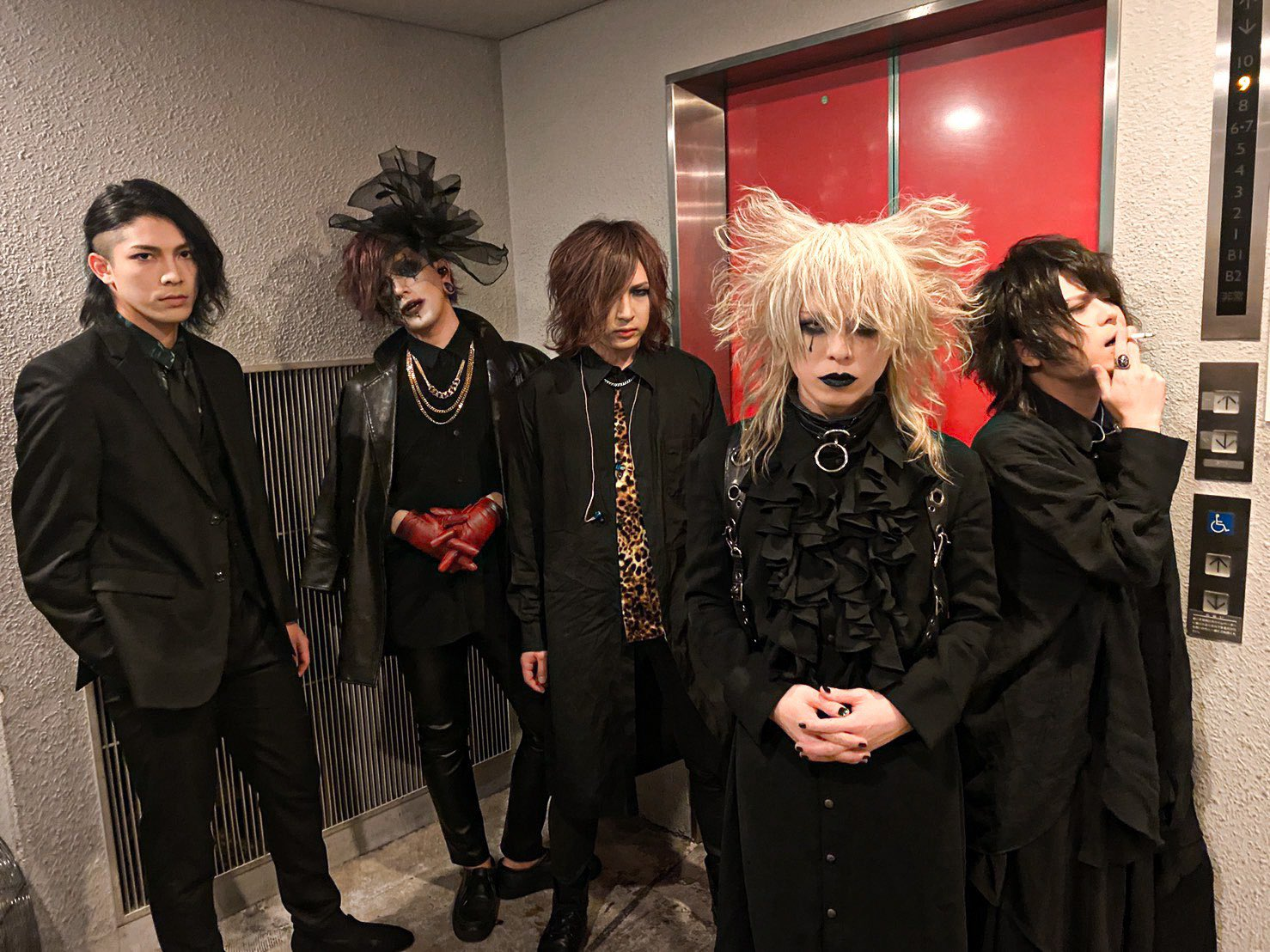

Background information
- Origin: Tokyo, Japan
- Genres: Rock
- Years active: 2013–present
- Label: Goemon
- Members: Aki; Nao; Kuruto; Shohei
- Past members: Tamon
- Website: http://arlequin-web.com/

Arlequin (Japanese: アルルカン, Hepburn: Arurukan; formerly stylized as ΛrlequiΩ) is a four-piece Japanese visual kei rock band, formed in Tokyo in 2013.

== History ==
The formation of Arlequin was associated with the aspiration to be a band of a new generation of Nagoya kei, a dark subgenre of visual kei that emerged in the early nineties. Bands such as Kuroyume, Rouage and Laputa served as models. The band's name corresponds to the French term for harlequin, a clownish stage character whose origins are often located in the theatrical tradition of the Italian commedia dell'arte. According to the members' own statements, it was chosen to give the band's image a touch of the "eccentric" and "toxic."

Arlequin's beginnings were crowned with quick success: Their first single Arlequin (2013) reached #7 on the Oricon Singles Chart, and within a year of its formation, the band managed to sell out a concert at Shibuya Public Hall. According to various media, they achieved this feat faster than any other band in previous years. In April 2019, a Japanese music website Real Sound stated that Arlequin and Dezert had the potential to rise and become the "two big guns" of their visual kei generation, like X Japan and Luna Sea or Dir En Grey and Pierrot before them. In addition to a variety of singles and EPs, Arlequin has released five albums to date: Near Equal (2014), Utopia (2016), Bless (2018, mini-album), The Laughing Man (2020), and Monster (2022). Best-of albums were also released in 2017 (Kachikan no Chigai wa Yuiitsu no Sukuidatta), 2021 (Pieces), and 2022 (Anthology). Currently, the band is signed to indie label Goemon Records.

Arlequin regularly undertook major tours of Japan and released several live DVDs. In July 2016, vocalist Aki was forced to withdraw from scheduled live performances to recover from chronic vocal cord inflammation due to overuse of his voice. Arlequin hosted the So no Sekai event at Nanba Hatch on August 27, 2022, which also featured acts such as D'erlanger, Plastic Tree, Dezert, and Kizu. On October 24, 2022, they took part in a two-man live held by Deadman at Shinjuku Blaze.

On September 2, 2022, the band lost contact with Tamon. They decided to postpone the first three shows of their 9th anniversary tour, but the drummer got back in touch on the 5th. On January 20, 2023, Tamon reported that he was going to the hospital due to a fever and the band lost contact with him again. After he was absent from two events on the 21st and 22nd, he was fired from the band on the 23rd. In February 2023, Shūkan Bunshun revealed that Kuruto was under police investigation, accused of sexually assaulting Shohei's girlfriend in July 2021. Four months later, the case was dismissed.

== Style ==
Arlequin's music is conventional metalcore (hard and fast guitar riffs, growling interludes), interspersed with poppy rock elements. The themes of their songs are often melancholic as well as of socio-critical and provocative character (Dame Ningen, Omit, Makka na Uso). The lyrics are mostly in Japanese, with rare English passages.

As is common for visual kei bands, Arlequin's focus lies heavily on flamboyant, polished, and frequently varied optics, presented in a variety of music videos and other visual media. According to their band name, the members almost exclusively present themselves in heavy makeup and colorful, clownish costumes, with vocalist Aki miming the role of a crying clown. An important visual leitmotif, the circus, has also been used on a larger scale in stage decorations at live shows.

== Members ==
- Aki (暁) - vocals (2013–present)
- Kuruto (來堵) - guitar (2013–present)
- Nao (奈緒) - guitar (2013–present)
- Shohei (祥平) - bass (2013–present)

Past members

- Tamon (堕門) - drums (2013–2023)

== Discography ==
=== Albums and mini-albums ===
- 2014 – Near Equal
- 2016 – Utopia
- 2018 – Bless
- 2020 – The Laughing Man
- 2022 – Monster

=== Best-of albums ===
- 2017 – Kachikan no Chigai wa Yuiitsu no Sukuidatta (価値観の違いは唯一の救いだった )
- 2021 – Pieces
- 2022 – Anthology

=== Singles and EPs ===
- 2013 – Arlequin
- 2014 – 似非林檎-eseringo-
- 2014 – Eclipse
- 2014 – Stella (ステラ)
- 2014 – Hakaana (墓穴)
- 2014 – Ichijiku (無花果)
- 2015 – Dilemma (ジレンマ)
- 2015 – All I Need
- 2015 – Douke no Hana (道化ノ華)
- 2015 – Qualia (クオリア)
- 2016 – Paranoia
- 2016 – Karma (カルマ)
- 2017 – Kageboushi (影法師)
- 2017 – Makka na Uso (真っ赤な嘘)
- 2017 – Puzzle
- 2018 – Exist
- 2019 – Razzle-dazzle（ラズルダズル）
- 2019 – Anima
- 2020 – Ikari (怒り)
- 2020 – Veludo (ビロード)
- 2021 – Sekai no Owari to Yoake Mae (世界の終わりと夜明け前) / Siren (サイレン)
- 2022 – Monster
- 2022 – Libra
- 2022 – Pictures
- 2022 – Chaosdive
