= Vistlip =

Japanese visual kei rock band

vistlip
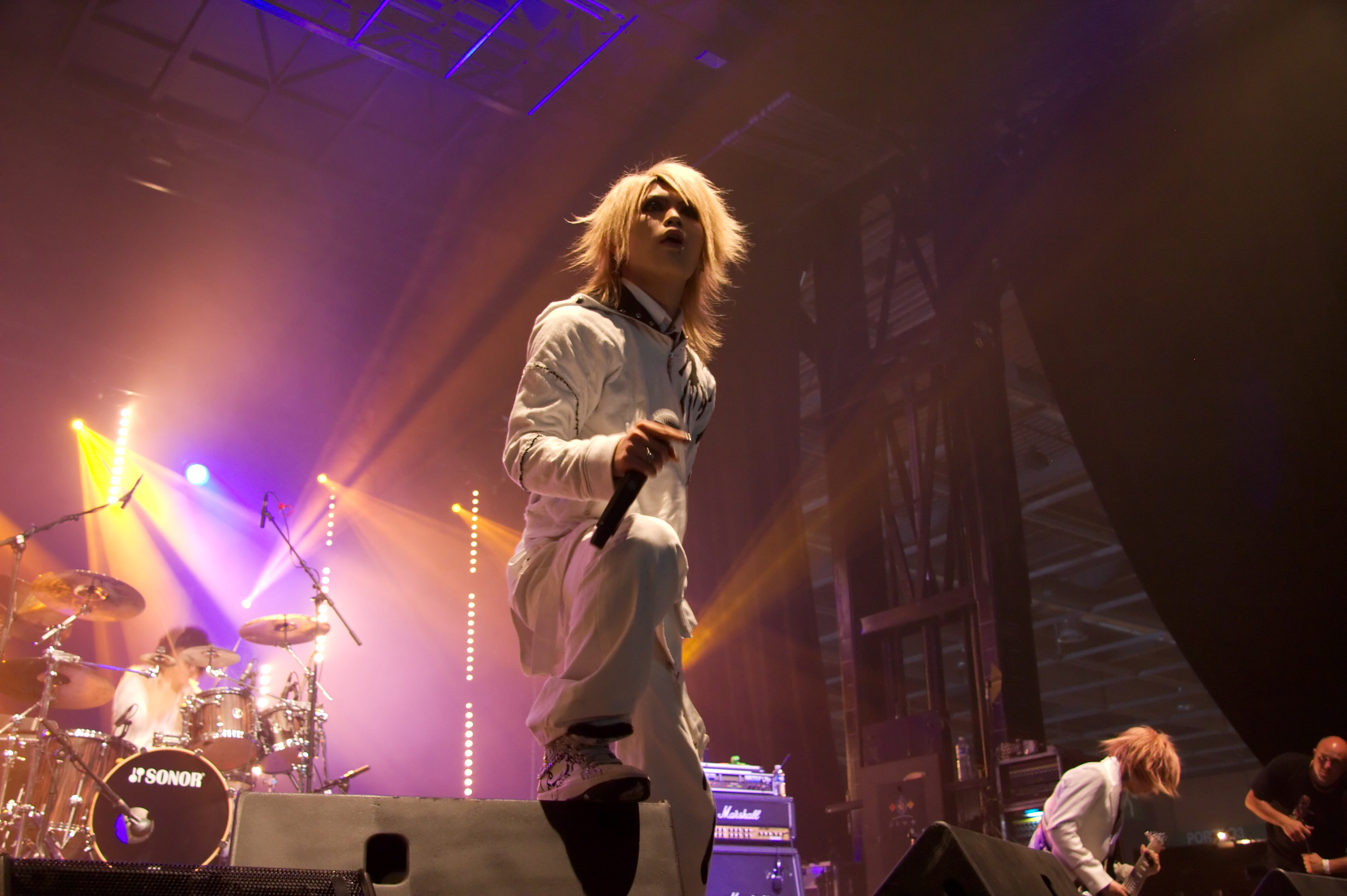

Background information
- Origin: Tokyo, Japan
- Genres: Alternative rock; electronic rock; rap rock; pop rock; symphonic rock; nu metal; pop punk
- Years active: 2007–present
- Label: Marvelous Entertainment
- Members: Tomo; Yuh; Umi; Rui; Tohya
- Website: vistlip.com

Vistlip (typeset as vistlip) is a five-member Japanese visual kei rock band that formed on July 7, 2007, and is currently signed to Delfi Sound and Marvelous Entertainment.

== History ==
Logo

The band was reported to have been driving along Nagae Tunnel down the Joushin’etsu Expressway in Nagano city, Nagano prefecture, when the band's car, driven by the drummer Tohya, crashed into the tunnel wall at approximately 1:15 a.m. The band's manager, Asako Sakakibara (31), had been in the backseat when the impact forced her out of the car. The damage that her body sustained led to her death. According to highway police, the rest of the passengers sustained minor neck and arm injuries and no other fatalities were reported.

After the accident the band took a six-month break from their activities. They resumed their activities in February 2011.

In September 2015, Vistlip reunited with Kiryū, R-shitei and BugLug for a tour together, named 4Byoshi. In 2017, the tour occurred again.

== Members ==
- Tomo (智)
  - Vocals
  - Born on 13 January 1986 in Fukuoka Prefecture, Japan
  - Band history: D'e lude → (Kuroneko Yamato) → Jessica → Replia (support vocalist) → vistlip & Lill
- Yuh
  - Guitar
  - Born on 28 July 1983 in Germany
  - Band history: Желать → Sin → Jessica → vistlip
- Umi (海)
  - Guitar
  - Born on 20 July 1983 in Tokyo, Japan
  - Band history: Zeek → Replia → vistlip
- Rui (瑠伊)
  - Bass
  - Born on 15 November 1985 in Hyōgo Prefecture, Japan
  - Band history: COЯE THE CHILD (as Shunsuke) → Jessica (as Rui) → vistlip & Lill
- Tohya
  - Drums
  - Born on 3 January 1986 in Kanagawa Prefecture, Japan
  - Band history: Rave!! → Replia (as Tomoya, support drummer), YUKiTO-Heart of Project- (as Tomoya) → vistlip

== Influence ==
The vocalist Tomo said that in his sixth grade days he listened to L'Arc-en-Ciel a lot and it was the band that influenced him to become a vocalist and then in the first grade he discovered Dir En Grey and decided to jump into the visual kei scene. He has demonstrated interest in The Gazette too and some J-pop artists and groups like AKB48 and Arashi. He also like some westerns bands like Linkin Park, Limp Bizkit and Slipknot.

The guitarist Yuh said that he got in rock music through Lenny Kravitz. He also quoted Japanese bands that influenced him like X Japan, L'Arc-en-Ciel, Luna Sea, Glay and Siam Shade. Yuh was into classical music from a young age, starting with the violin to cello to guitar.

The guitarist Umi said that hide and Luna Sea are the first visual kei artists he encountered. He said Rouage's major second single "Insomnia" and Laputa's major first single "硝子の肖像(Garasu no Shouzou)" got him into Visual Kei and started playing in a band. Like Tomo he also likes Dir En Grey too and it's easy to notice their influence in most of his looks as he is the member who wears the darkest and heaviest makeup most of the time. He also likes Mucc, deadman and Cali Gari. He said that Acidman and Limp Bizkit made him interested in other genres than the usual Visual Kei.

The bassist Rui is notable influenced by L'Arc-en-Ciel and Hyde, he is a devoted fan. He also likes The Gazette. Some years ago he also talked about My Chemical Romance.

The drummer Tohya said that he was part of the brass band club during middle school. He also said that rhythm games was the roots of his curiosity for music and then he got interested on bands. Like Tomo and Yuh he also likes Linkin Park, Limp Bizkit, Glay and some J-pop acts. His the member that composes the major part of the melodies and in his compositions it is easy to notice the influence of these artists, genres (J-pop) and videogame music.

== Discography ==
=== Singles ===
	Release date	Title
1st	September 3, 2008	Sara
2nd	October 8, 2008	alo[n]e
3rd	November 5, 2008	drop note.
4th	August 5, 2009	-OZONE-
5th	May 12, 2010	STRAWBERRY BUTTERFLY
6th	July 7, 2010	Hameln
7th	June 1, 2011	SINDRA
8th	April 11, 2012	Recipe
9th	July 4, 2012	B
10th	October 31, 2012	Shinkaigyo no yume wa shosen / Artist
11th	April 3, 2013	CHIMERA
12th	April 9, 2014	Period
13th	August 20, 2014	Jack
14th	December 24, 2014	Yoru
15th	August 5, 2015	OVERTURE
16th	November 11, 2015	COLD CASE
17th	February 17, 2016	CONTRAST
18th	November 30, 2016	Snowman
19th	November 8, 2017	It
20th	December 6, 2017	Timer
21st	August 8, 2018	BLACK MATRIX
22nd	September 18, 2019	CRACK&MARBLE CITY
23rd	April 28, 2021	Act
24th	September 14, 2024	B.N.S
25th	July 30, 2025	BET
26th	January 1, 2026	UNLOCKED

=== Mini albums ===
	Release date	Title
1st	April 23, 2008	Revolver
2nd	April 4, 2009	PATRIOT
3rd	January 1, 2013	GLOSTER
4th	March 30, 2016	SENSE
5th	March 18, 2020	No.9

=== Albums ===
	Release date	Title
1st	December 9, 2009	THEATER
2nd	December 14, 2011	ORDER MADE
3rd	July 17, 2013	CHRONUS
4th	March 18, 2015	LAYOUT
5th	March 29, 2017	BitterSweet
6th	November 28, 2018	STYLE
7th	March 30, 2022	M.E.T.A
8th	January 8, 2025	THESEUS

=== Best albums ===
	Release date	Title
1st	December 4, 2013	SINGLE COLLECTION

=== Live-distributed singles ===
	Release date	Title
1st	December 17, 2008	Dead Cherry
2nd	July 7, 2011	I am...
3rd	December 25, 2013	Merry Bell
4th	December 25, 2023	DIGEST -Independent Blue Film-
5th	March 17, 2024	Invisible

=== DVD ===
	Release date	Title
1	December 23, 2009	BUG
2	June 23, 2010	GATHER TO the THEATER
3	October 19, 2011	revelation space
4	November 28, 2012	THE END.
5	May 29, 2013	FBA
6	December 24, 2014	Good vibes CIRCUIT II
7	December 23, 2015	vistlip tour document DVD Left side LAYOUT [idea]
8	June 8, 2016	vistlip Right side LAYOUT [SENSE]

=== Tie-in ===
Song title	Tie-in
"Sara"	An ending theme song on Japanese TV program 超最先端エンタメ情報番組 Tokyoブレイクする～! in August 2008
"Alone"	An ending theme song on Japanese TV program 超最先端エンタメ情報番組 Tokyoブレイクする～! in September 2008
"Drop Note"	An ending theme song on Japanese TV program 超最先端エンタメ情報番組 Tokyoブレイクする～! in October 2008
"Ozone"	An ending theme song on Japanese anime Yu-Gi-Oh! 5D's
"Artist"	An ending theme song on Japanese anime Yu-Gi-Oh! Zexal
"Period"	An theme song on Japanese PSP game Bakumatsu Rock
"Jack"	An opening theme song on Japanese anime Bakumatsu Rock
"Scapegoat"	An opening theme song on Japanese PS vita game BinaryStar
"Yoru"	An ending theme song on Japanese anime Akatsuki no Yona
"Contrast"	An ending theme song on Japanese anime Divine Gate
"Act"	An ending theme song on Japanese anime Duel Masters King (2021)
