= Laputa discography =

- Studio albums: 7
- EPs: 4
- Demo albums: 2
- Compilation albums: 3
- Singles: 12
- Video albums: 8

Laputa's discography consists of 7 studio albums, 4 EPs, 12 singles, 3 compilations, 8 music videos, and 2 demos. Formed in 1993, they released their first album Memai in 1995, a year after their debut single “Watashi ga Kieru”. Their second album became their first release on a major label, EMI, titled Kagerō (1996). It was followed by Emadara (1997), which was named one of the best albums from 1989 to 1998 in a 2004 issue of the music magazine Band Yarouze. The subsequent albums Jakō (1998) and Cakera (1999) reached the top 10 on the Oricon Albums Chart. The last two, Heaven (2001) and New Temptation (2002), dropped to No. 50 at Oricon, due to changes in musical style and record label. Laputa then disbanded in 2004.

== Studio albums ==
Title	Release	Charts peak position		Sales
Title	Release	Oricon	Billboard Japan	Sales
Indies
Memai (眩～めまい～暈)	February 24, 1995; September 23, 1998	66 (re-release)	—	5,270 (re-release)
EMI
Kagerō (蜉～かげろう～蝣)	October 23, 1996	24	—	33,340
Emadara (絵～エマダラ～斑)	June 25, 1997	24	—	28,520
Jakō (麝～ジャコウ～香)	March 18, 1998	10	—	54,230
Cakera (翔～カケラ～裸)	June 9, 1999	10	17	49,920
Nippon Crown
Heaven (楽～ヘブン～園)	March 16, 2001	50	—	9,120
New Temptation (誘～New Temptation～惑)	July 24, 2002	50	—	6,880
"—" notes that the recording did not appear on this chart or that the position could not be found.

== EPs ==
Title	Release	Oricon peak position	Sales
Indies
Kurumeku Haijin (眩めく廃人)	February 25, 1996	24	5,780
Nippon Crown
Glitter	March 21, 2002	66	5,300
Sparks Monkey	April 23, 2003	75	4,602
Material Pleasures	March 17, 2004	89	3,587

== Singles ==
Title	Release	Oricon peak position	Sales	Album
Indies
"Watashi ga Kieru" (私が消える)	May 5, 1994	—	limited to 1000 copies	Non album single
EMI
"Glass no Shouzō" (ガラスの肖像)	September 9, 1996	34	20,020	Kagerō
"Eve ~Last night for you~"	May 28, 1997	33	28,080	Emadara
"Meet again"	November 12, 1997	20	39,250	Jakō
"Yurenagara..." (揺れながら...)	February 4, 1998	25	29,660	Jakō
"Feelin' the sky"	September 23, 1998	15	34,170	Cakera
"Breath"	January 1, 1999	29	32,730	Cakera
"Chimes"	March 17, 1999	25	22,670	Cakera
"Virgin cry"	May 19, 1999	23	21,720	Cakera
Nippon Crown
"Shape ~in the shape of wing~"	October 25, 2000	26	17,110	Heaven
"Silent on-looker"	February 21, 2001	43	10,140	Heaven
"Shinkai (深海) / Brand-new color"	June 21, 2002	58	2,970	Non album single
"—" notes that the recording did not appear on this chart.

== Compilations ==
Title	Release	Oricon peak position	Sales
Nippon Crown
Laputa coupling collection +xxxk [1996-1999 Singles]	February 23, 2000	41	8,290
Laputa 3DISC BEST 〜1995-1999 except Coupling Collection～	October 25, 2000	43	6,320
Best AL+CLIPS 2000〜2004	July 28, 2004	—	3,571
"—" notes that the recording did not appear on this chart.

== Videos ==
- Paradoxical Reality (September 4, 1994)
- Hakoniwa (箱庭; July 7, 1996)
- MOV(i)E ON DARKNESS (July 24, 1994, in VHS, May 16, 2002, in DVD, re-released on November 9, 2011)
- CLIPS OF CRUNCH L∞P (March 18, 1993, in VHS, May 16, 2002, in DVD, re-released on November 9, 2011)
- CLIPS OF CRUNCH L∞P II (June 9, 1999 in VHS, May 16, 2002, in DVD, re-released on November 9, 2011)
- CLIPS OF CRUNCH L∞P III (December 6, 2000, in VHS, April 24, 2002, in DVD)
- Heaven to Perfection (November 21, 2001, in VHS, April 24, 2002, in DVD)
- ALL BURST (December 15, 2004)

== Demos ==
- "Saddist no Yume" (Saddistの夢, September 4, 1993)
- "Naraku no Soko" (奈落の底, December 20, 1993)
