= Kagerou (band) =

Japanese visual kei rock band

- Origin: Tokyo, Japan
- Genres: Avant-garde metal; alternative metal; grunge; gothic rock; industrial rock
- Years active: 1999–2007
- Labels: Loop Ash; Lizard; Gan-Shin (EU)
- Past members: Masaya; Kuya; Daisuke; Yuana; Kazu; Shizumi

Kagerou (Japanese: 蜉蝣, Hepburn: Kagerō) was a Japanese visual kei rock band, formed in September 1999 by vocalist Daisuke and bassist Masaya, with guitarist Yuana joining shortly afterward. In 2000 Kagerou left their record label Loop Ash to sign with Lizard, a sub-label of Free-Will. After experiencing success within Japan, the band set their sights abroad and in 2005 they played in both Germany and France.

== History ==
Upon releasing their first single in June 2010 and the second in July, Daisuke's solo project, "Daisuke to Kuro no Injatachi", was due to release an album and follow it with a tour in Europe and the US. However, Daisuke died on July 15, 2010.

Daisuke to Kuro no Injatachi then released an album on February 20, 2011. Composed of unfinished works by Daisuke, it was entitled Shikkoku no Hikari (漆黒の光, "Black Light"). It features Shizûmi, Yuana, Kazu, aie (ex:Deadman, The Studs), Kyo (Dir En Grey), Tatsuro (MUCC), Karyu (ex: D'espairsRay, Angelo) and members of Merry, 12012, Kannivalism and Boogieman.

== Members ==
Daisuke (大佑) – vocals – Daisuke penned all the lyrics for Kagerou. His previous bands included Le'Cheri and Fatima, in which he was the drummer. Aside from drums, he also played the piano. Daisuke was known for his audience interaction such as stage diving and was commonly nicknamed 'charisma vocalist' despite his small stature. Following the dissolution of Kagerou in 2007, Daisuke formed The Studs with aie (ex:Deadman). After they went on activity pause, he created his solo project, Daisuke to Kuro no Injatachi. Daisuke died on July 15, 2010.

Yuana (ユアナ) – guitars – Yuana wrote the majority of the band's songs. His past bands include Sweet Hallucination, and Alicia where he was known as "Ewana". He is currently the guitarist of Boogieman.

Kazu – bass – Kazu's past bands include Research, in which he played under the name "Kazunori", and Aioria.

Shizûmi (静海) – drums and percussion – Shizumi's past bands are Mitre Curé, better known as Mélusine.

Former members

Masaya – bass – He left in 2000 and joined Kar'Maria. He then retired and left the music industry.

Kuya – bass – Kuya joined Kagerou in January, 2001 and subsequently left in August to join Guiche.

== Discography ==
=== Albums ===
- Kagerou (蜉蝣) (July 30, 2003)
- Rakushu (落首) (August 18, 2004)
- Guroushoku (愚弄色) (July 27, 2005)
- Kurohata (黒旗) (July 19, 2006)
- Shinjuuka (心中歌) (December 27, 2006)

=== Singles ===
- Biological Slicer (April 4, 2000)
  1. "Eroa" (エロア)
  2. "R shitei" (R指定)
  3. "Saigo no Kensa" (最期の検査)
  4. "Wrist-cutter" (リストカッター)
- Hakkyou Sakadachi Onanist (発狂逆立ちオナニスト) (June 27, 2001)
  1. "Seitekikinchou Implant" (性的緊張インプラント)
  2. "Nawa" (縄)
  3. "Shikkou Yuuyo Sannen" (執行猶予三年)
- Jikasei Full Course (自家製フルコース) (July 18, 2001)
  1. "Joumyaku Salad" (静脈サラダ)
  2. "Urami Koto" (怨み言)
  3. "Kakusei Jelly" (覚醒ゼリー)
- Iro Megane to Scandal (色メガネとスキャンダル) (January 9, 2002)
  1. "Yūgure no Shazai" (夕暮れの謝罪)
  2. "Exotic na Kansenshou" (エキゾチックな感染症)
  3. "Soushitsu" (葬失)
- kagerou no Jiten (蜉蝣事典 ＜大人の書店＞) (May 4, 2002)
  1. "Idol Kurui no Shinrigaku" (アイドル狂いの心裏学)
- Mizu Hitari no Kazoe Uta (水浸りの数え唄) (July 10, 2002)
  1. "Yubikiri" (ゆびきり)
  2. "Kikaku Mono" (企画モノ)
  3. "R Shitei" (R指定)
- Hiaburi no Kazoe Uta (火炙りの数え唄) (July 10, 2002)
  1. "Gozen sanji no taiyou Kōsen" (午前三時の太陽光線)
  2. "Utsu" (鬱)
  3. "Wrist-cutter" (リストカッター)
- Sakebi (叫び) (February 28, 2003, distributed at the "Katana Kari Tour")
  1. "Sakebi" (叫び)
  2. "Kichiku Moralism" (鬼畜モラリズム)
- Kakokei Shinjitsu (過去形真実) (May 7, 2003)
  1. "Kakokei Shinjitsu" (過去形真実)
  2. "Sekkyou 38.5°C" (説教38.5°C)
  3. "Kakokei Shinjitsu (Remix)" (過去形真実)
  4. "Sekkyou 38.5°C (Remix)" (説教38.5°C)
- XII dizzy (January 28, 2004)
  1. "Xll dizzy"
  2. "Soine Pesari" (添い寝ペッサリー)
  3. "Kuchita sekishin" (朽ちた赤心)
- Sakurakurakura (サクラクラクラ) (February 10, 2004, distributed at the "Kaijou Gentei Tour")
  1. "Sakurakurakura" (サクラクラクラ)
- Kurokami no AITSU (黒髪のアイツ) (December 8, 2004)
  1. "Kurokami no AITSU" (黒髪のアイツ)
  2. "Shibire Kokoro (Live)" (痺れ心)
  3. "Koi uta (Live)" (恋唄)
  4. "Masatsu Shinkou (Live)" (摩擦信仰)
- Shiroi Karasu (白い鴉) (December 8, 2004)
  1. "Shiroi Karasu" (白い鴉)
  2. "Soine Pesari (Live)" (添い寝ペッサリー)
  3. "3・2・1 (Live)"
  4. "XII dizzy (Live)"
- Zetsubou ni SAYONARA (絶望にサヨナラ) (March 23, 2005)
  1. "Zetsubou ni SAYONARA" (絶望にサヨナラ)
  2. "Watashi." (私。)
  3. "Ai wa Savage" (愛はサベージ)
- Kusatta Umi de Oborekakateiru Boku wo Sukutte Kureta Kimi
  (腐った海で溺れかけている僕を救ってくれた君) (November 30, 2005, (Three Versions, A, B, C)
  1. "Kusatta Umi de Oborekakateiru Boku wo Sukutte Kureta Kimi"
    (腐った海で溺れかけている僕を救ってくれた君)
  2. "Hibike, Kono koe." (響け､この声。)
  3. "Shuuchi no Ori" (羞恥の檻) (Only available in Version A)
  4. "Yuuyami wo Saita Hana" (夕闇を裂いた花) (Only available in Version B)
  5. Making of Footage (Only available in Version C)
- Tonarimachi no Kanojo (となり町の彼女) (June 6, 2006)
  1. "Tonarimachi no Kanojo (となり町の彼女)
  2. "Seija no Ame" (聖者の雨)
  3. "Ragan (Remix)" (裸眼)
  4. "Sabashisa to Nemure (Remix)" (寂しさと眠れ)

=== Demo tapes ===
- Biological Slicer
- Biyou Seikei Ishi no Shumi (美容整形医師の趣味) (April 21, 2000)

=== Compilations ===
- "0718" (July 18, 2000, distributed CD)
- "Meisou Honnou" (迷走本能) from Japanesque Rock Collectionz (July 28, 2000, compilation CD by Cure Magazine)
- "Mousou Chikashitsu" (妄想地下室) from Kakumei ~Voice of Rebirth~ (August 30, 2000)

=== Omnibus ===
- "Kichiku Moralism" (鬼畜モラリズム) from LOOP OF LIFE (February 20, 2001)
- "Kakusei Jelly" from Shock Edge 2001 (September 29, 2001)

=== DVDs ===
- kagerou no Video Clips (Clip Collection) (蜉蝣のビデオクリップ) (September 9, 2002)
- Zekkyō Psychopath (絶叫サイコパス) (January 28, 2004)
- Rakushu Enjō Saishū Kōen (落首炎上最終公演) (June 29, 2005)
- kagerou: Tour '06-'07 Last Live (March 28, 2007)
