= Dai 7 Jikkenshitsu =

Studio album by Cali Gari
- Released: May 22, 2002
- Genre: Experimental rock, post punk
- Length: 56:24
- Label: Victor Entertainment

Cali Gari chronology
Dai 6 Jikkenshitsu (2001)	Dai 7 Jikkenshitsu (2002)	8 (2003)

Dai 7 Jikkenshitsu is the first major label album of the band Cali Gari. The album has an expressive style that incorporates many different musical components and is not typical visual kei.

The band ceased activities in June 2003 and returned in 2009 with a more pop-oriented style and electronic influences. Until 2003, the band released albums independently indie, under the label Misshitsu Neurose, owned by the band's guitarist Ao Sakurai. However, starting in 2002, the band signed with the major label Victor Entertainment. Some of the indie albums include tracks with commercials and promotional interviews of the band.

In 2001, a side project of the group also emerged, the band La'royque de Zavy, an alter ego of Cali≠gari parodying older visual kei bands. Under this name, the group released the single moumoku de arugayue no THE touitsukan on 3 June 2001.

== Track listing ==
1. Dai 7 Jikkenshitsu Intro (「第7実験室」入口) – 0:17
2. Haikara•Satsubatsu•Haiso•Zessan (ハイカラ・殺伐・ハイソ・絶賛) – 4:31
3. Mahoraba Blues (まほらば憂愁 （ブルーズ）) – 3:38
4. Maguro (マグロ) – 4:44
5. Drama: Kuroi Kyuutai (ドラマ「黒い球体」) – 5:15
6. Kuroi Kyuutai (黒い球体) – 3:51
7. Kill, Kill, Maim! (きりきりまいむ) – 2:35
8. Digitable Niuniu (デジタブルニウニウ) – 5:07
9. Tainai Souon Ayanashi Anti-Kushou (体内騒音あやなしアンチ苦笑)– 2:28
10. Wazurai (わずらい) – 3:57
11. Tokyo Rose au Monde Club (東京（トキオ）ロゼヲモンド倶楽部) – 5:16
12. Sora mo Waratteru (空も笑ってる) – 6:28
13. Tokyo-Byou (東京病) – 8:13
14. Dai 7 Jikkenshitsu Outro (「第7実験室」出口) – 0:04

== Personnel ==
- Shuuji Ishii – vocals
- Ao Sakurai – guitar
- Kenjirou Murai – bass
- Makoto Takei – drums
