= 0.1g no Gosan =

Japanese rock band

- Origin: Tokyo, Japan
- Genre: Rock
- Years active: 2015–present
- Members: Yuu Midorikawa; Tomoyuki Kawamura; Mari Mizuta; Daisuke Masaki
- Past members: Iria Kanzaki
- Website: gosan.g1-corp.com

0.1g no Gosan (0.1gの誤算) is a Japanese rock band, from visual kei scene, formed in 2015. It currently consists of Yuu Midorikawa, Tomoyuki Kawamura, Mari Mizuta, and Daisuke Masaki. The band is known for its unconventional live tour campaigns.

== Career ==
0.1g no Gosan was formed in late 2015, but officially debuted on March 24, 2016. You invited Tomoyuki Kawamura to join the group during a dinner out, and the idea for the group's name came from the notation "0.1 g of salt" on one of the dishes on the menu. Four months after their debut, they held their first show, which was sold out. In December, the band held a series of three free concerts in Nagoya, Osaka, and Tokyo.

Daisuke Masaki and Iria Kanzaki, alongside MiA, appeared as guest musicians in Miura Ayme's 2018 music video for "Kudeta Love". Kanzaki also performed as a guest drummer at Ayme's anniversary event. In May 2019, 0.1g no Gosan announced the release of their ninth single, "Zetsubou Menbure Girl". The band also announced a set of three singles to be sold exclusively at their May 11 concert in Hokkaido. Fans were able to vote for one of the three songs, were the one with the most votes would receive a music video.

The concert celebrating the band's fourth anniversary was originally scheduled for March 28, 2020, but was postponed until August 13 due to the COVID-19 pandemic in Japan.

Singer Yuu Midorikawa participated in Bandai Namco's multimedia project announced in October 2021. featuring two fictional bands, Visual Karma, as one of the first artists responsible for the musical production.

As part of a series of unique conceptual concerts fueled by their growing social media presence, the band held an exclusive concert for children on August 28, 2022, which they were able to attend for free, accompanied by their guardians.

On February 16, 2024, 0.1g no Gosan released the music videos for "Suiren no Hanakotoba" (睡蓮の華言葉) and "Artemis no Yutsu -Jukou to Maria-" (アルテミスの憂鬱〜銃口とマリア〜). Unlike the band's previous work, which featured narrative-driven music videos, these focused on the members' performances, with an industrial setting and military-inspired costumes. This year, they performed at Japan Expo Thailand.

On March 19, 2026, the band celebrated their 10th anniversary with a concert at Pacifico Yokohama, which was broadcast live on the Niconico. In May, Midorikawa addressed a controversy surrounding his relationship with a longtime fan, describing it as "a 12-year friendship between comrades-in-arms." Although he considered suspending his activities, he decided to continue with the support of the other members and stated that he treats all fans equally.

== Popularity and themes ==
Real Sound described 0.1g no Gosan as the leading band in a genre of visual kei bands with an unconventional musical and promotional approach (named "kisō tengai-kei"). It noted that the band can combine pop and metal in the same song, writes unusual lyrics, and do challenging concert campaigns, mentioning that this last point is what draws the most attention and attracts fans.

According to Toretame, 0.1g no Gosan's songs are characterized by the use of synthesizers, fast-paced melodies, and memorable lyrics—all of which are easy to listen.

The band's concerts feature a lot of interaction between the members and the audience. Lead singer Yuu Midorikawa encourages fans to get excited at the front of the stage, but also supports those who prefer to watch quietly from a distance, for example.

== Members ==
- Daisuke Masaki (眞崎大輔) – bass
- Tomoyuki Kawamura (河村友雪) – guitar
- Mari Mizuta (水田魔梨) – guitar
- Yuu Midorikawa (緑川裕宇) – vocals

=== Former members ===
- Iria Kanzaki (神崎流空) – drums

== Discography ==
=== Studio albums ===
- Heisei Gosan Taizen (平成誤算大全; January 8, 2019)
- Heisei Gosan Taizen -Dai 2-kan- (平成誤算大全-第2巻-; March 28, 2020)
- Shinwa o Motanai Seiza wa, (神話を持たない星座は、; December 24, 2025)
