= Dezert =

Japanese visual kei rock band

- Origin: Japan
- Genres: Alternative rock; pop punk; metalcore; nu metal; alternative metal
- Years active: 2011–present
- Labels: Mad Face, Himawari Kai, Maverick, Nippon Crown
- Members: Chiaki; Miyako; Sacchan; Sora
- Past members: Kira; Tetsuro
- Website: https://www.dezert.jp/

Dezert (stylized as DEZERT) is a Japanese visual kei rock band formed in 2011. Their current line-up features Chiaki on vocals, Sacchan on bass, Miyako on guitar and Sora on drums.

Real Sound indicated that Arlequin and Dezert have the potential to be "the double giants" of the new generation of visual kei, as it was with X Japan and Luna Sea in the first generation.

== Career ==
=== 2011–2014: Mad Face ===
Initially named And Emily and later Acid Cherry King, they were a session band formed in 2010 by vocalist Chiaki, bassist SaZ, drummer Tetsuro and guitarist Kira. The group changed their name to DEZERT in 2011 and released their debut single "Boku no Himitsu to Reizouko" the following year. Originally, Dezert's musicality was influenced by heavy and aggressive elements such as metalcore, nu-metal and hardcore punk. On March 3, 2012, former support drummer Sora officially joined the band.

In 2013, Dezert participated in one of hide's tribute albums, hide TRIBUTE III -Visual SPIRITS-, covering the track D.O.D. (DRINK OR DIE).

=== 2015–2017: Himawari Kai ===
On December 27, 2015, guitarist Kira left the band after a concert. Miyako was a support guitarist and a few months later he officially joined the band. The album Saiko no Shokutaku would be released on December 16, but has been postponed to January 20, 2016.

On November 23, 2016, they released their second compilation album Kanzen Ongen Shu - Zantei Teki Occult Shukanshi (2) with rare songs, played or distributed only at live shows. Dezert participated in Cure magazine's World Visual Festival on April 30 together with other visual kei bands, including groups from outside Japan.

In 2017, the band covered tracks for tribute albums to Mucc and D'erlanger. SaZ decided to change his stage name to Sacchan during the "1" tour.

=== 2018–2022: Maverick ===
"Now, I don't have the old-fashioned image of a rock band anymore. A rock band is something talented people like, and I expected alcohol, cigarettes, women and so on, but I'm completely different. [...] When I'm in a band, I can't move on unless I find something I don't like. I think it's an album that really makes me think about it."

— Chiaki

At the fall of 2018, Dezert signed with MAVERICK (Danger Crue subdivision). After the label change, they changed their visual and musical style, moving from aggressive music and vocals to softer melodies. They released Today on November 8, 2018, with two singles previously distributed in concerts: "おはよう (Ohayō))" (Good morning) and "おやすみ (Oyasumi))" (Good night).

On November 27, 2019, black hole was released. The album presents the inferiority complex suffered by Chiaki, who writes all lyrics. He explained about the change in style, the album and his feelings in an interview: "Now, I don't have the old-fashioned image of a rock band anymore. A rock band is something talented people like, and I expected alcohol, cigarettes, women and so on, but I'm completely different. [...] When I'm in a band, I can't move on unless I find something I don't like. I think it's an album that really makes me think about it."

Dezert embarked on tour with Mucc in 2019, and the two bands released the collaborative single "Mushishi/Gachagachamukumuku (蟲／ガチャガチャムクムク) under the stage name DEZERMUCC. The single was limited to purchase during the tour performances.

On November 16, 2020 Dezert released the single "Your Song". In May 2021 they announced their eighth studio album, Rainbow, to be released on July 21. On November 1, 2022, Dezert took part in a two-man live held by Deadman at Shinjuku Blaze.

=== 2023–present: Nippon Crown ===
After releasing their new album "The Heart Tree" on the 10th of January, 2024, the band announced that they would play their first solo Nippon Budokan live on December 27, 2024. They later announced a 47 prefecture tour in 2025, concluding the tour final at Makuhari Messe event hall on March 20, 2026.

== Influences ==
Sora states that his biggest influences are X Japan as well as hide, and also participated in a cover band of Dir En Grey. Sacchan says he didn't have many influences, but his favorite band is Kaientai.

== Members ==
- Chiaki (千秋) – vocals, guitar (2010–present)
- Miyako – guitar (2015–present)
- Sacchan (SaZ) – bass, backing vocals (2010–present)
- Sora – drums (2012–present)

=== Former members ===
- Tetsuro – drums (2011–2012)
- Kira (キラ) – guitar (2011–2015)

== Discography ==
Studio albums

- Title nashi (タイトルなし) (November 12, 2014), Oricon: 43
- Saiko no Shokutaku (最高の食卓) (January 20, 2016), Oricon: 31
- TODAY (August 8, 2018) Oricon: 28
- black hole (November 27, 2019), Oricon: 43
- Rainbow (July 21, 2021), Oricon: 35
- The Heart Tree (January 10, 2024), Oricon: 17
- Dezert (June 11, 2025). Oricon: 23
