= Deadman (band) =

Japanese rock band

- The four members of Deadman (from left to right): Aie, Toki, Mako, Kazuya.

Background information
- Origin: Nagoya, Japan
- Genres: Alternative rock; indie rock; post-punk; hardcore punk
- Years active: 2000–2006, 2019–present
- Label: David Skull No
- Spinoff of: Kein
- Members: Mako; Aie
- Past members: Toki; Yukino; Takamasa; Kazuya

Deadman (the name of which is typically stylized in all-lowercase, as deadman) is a Japanese rock band founded in Nagoya in 2000. The group gained notoriety for popularizing the Nagoya kei subgenre of visual kei; a style characterized by a substantially "darker" sound than most other forms derivative of the genre, alongside a greater focus on the details and nuances of vocals and instrumentation in musical composition. Deadman also quickly became known for vocalist Mako's heavily melancholic lyrics and thematic influences, as well as the band's blend of gloomy alternative rock with grunge textures elements of indie rock, gothic rock, and post-punk. The group disbanded in 2006 without explanation. Mako and guitarist Aie reunited as Deadman in 2019.

== History ==
=== Original run (2000–2006) ===
Guitarist and leader Aie, vocalist Mako and bassist Yukino (formerly known as "Yuki") were all previously in the band Kein. In 2000 they formed Deadman with drummer Toki, whom Aie previously played with in Lamiel. They played their first concert on January 6, 2001. Shortly after the April release of their first single, "Subliminal Effect", Yukino left the group and was replaced by Takamasa, previously of Lady. Yukino went on to the bands Gullet, lynch., and DimmDivision. In November 2001, Deadman released their first mini-album, Site of Scaffold. After a handful of singles (which had different variants), the band's first full-length studio album No Alternative was released on March 8, 2003. 701125, their second mini-album, was originally sold on tour or by mail order in April 2004. It would later receive a proper release on June 8, 2005 under the title 701125+2.

In April 2005, Takamasa left and it was not until July when kazuya replaced him on bass. At the end of the year they released their second full-length album, In The Direction of Sunrise and Night Light. At the beginning of 2006, Deadman played a couple of shows in Europe. But in March they announced they would be disbanding and on May 23, 2006 performed their last concert at Shibuya O-East. Mako has stated that he showed "too much of [his] inner self" in Deadman and struggled mentally both during its run and after the band broke up.

Aie went on to form the band The Studs in 2007 with ex-bassist Yukino. They went on hiatus in 2009. He then formed both HighFashionParalyze and The God and Death Stars in 2010, all the while performing occasional solo shows. HighFashionParalyze recruited Sakura and kazu (Kagerou) in 2016 and changed their name to Gibkiy Gibkiy Gibkiy. On May 29, 2008, Mako released a photobook called Buried Alive by Words, which came with a CD of a song called "Buried with the Light" that features Közi on guitar and bass. kazuya released a solo album, under the name Gift, called A Man's Walking is Succession of Falls on June 20, 2008. In October 2021, Mako formed Loa-Roar with former Merry Go Round drummer Kyo. After 22 years, Mako, Yukino (who went back to using the name "Yuki") and Aie reunited Kein in 2022.

=== Reunion (2019–2024) ===
After 13 years, Mako and Aie announced a reunion as Deadman in March 2019. Aie said he had been asked by event organizers to reunite the band several times in the past decade, but he just happened to be talking to Mako and Merry bassist Tetsu about doing something together when the offer came again in 2018 and, to his surprise, Mako agreed. The vocalist said he turned down previous offers because he did not want to reignite the mental "trauma" he suffered from during and after Deadman, but agreed this time because with just Aie, Tetsu and himself, it would not be the "real" Deadman and he therefore expected it to be fun with a party-like atmosphere. After a performance on June 22 at Nagoya Bottom Line, where Aie revealed that the reunion would last for a year until September 2020, they played a one-man live at Ebisu Liquidroom on September 9, 2019. The duo were supported both times by Tetsu on bass and Asanao (lynch.) on drums. After two more performances in October and November, Deadman went on a three-date tour throughout December. In February 2020, the duo embarked on a joint tour with Gibkiy Gibkiy Gibkiy. Another joint tour, this time with Cali Gari, was set to take place in March. However, those dates and others were first postponed and then cancelled due to the COVID-19 pandemic in Japan. As a result, the duo decided to extend their reunion into 2021, which marked Deadman's 20th anniversary. They also announced plans to re-record some of their old songs, which were decided by a poll of their fan club.

A concert to mark the anniversary took place at Nagoya Diamond Hall on January 6, 2021, exactly 20 years since Deadman's first-ever performance. They performed a concert on May 23 at Tsutaya O-East, which is the same venue where they played their final concert in 2006. For the performance, the band replicated the lighting from the show 15 years earlier and gathered as much of the same staff as they could. The joint tour with Cali Gari took place in June, during which the two bands released the collaborative song "Shikeidai no Elevator", and Deadman held their own tour in July. At a December 4 concert at Shinjuku Loft celebrating the 20th anniversary of David Skull No Records, former Deadman members kazuya and Toki joined Mako and Aie onstage during the encore.

I am Here, Deadman's first album in 15 years, was released on January 15, 2022 by Maverick DC Group. Featuring re-recordings of old songs and one new track, it was recorded with kazuya and Toki on bass and drums respectively. Aie stated that although both work as salarymen, they were able to participate by recording only three songs a month for about a year and a half. The album was supported by a three-date tour from January 22 to February 11. A special concert, endroll 2022, was held at Spotify O-East on May 23 where two different line-ups of Deadman performed; Mako and Aie performed a set with former members kazuya and Toki, and another with current support members kazu and Asanao. Between September and November, Deadman held three two-man lives at Shinjuku Blaze, each with a different young visual kei band; the first with Razor, the second with Arlequin, and the third with Dezert.

In 2023, Deadman held the Dead Reminiscence tour exclusively for members of their fanclub between February 21 and 26. The Rabid Dog Walking a Tightrope tour took place between March 20 and April 16, and "Rabid Dog", a new song recorded with kazu and Asanao, was given out for free at the venues. Dead Reminiscence, a six-track album of old songs re-recorded with kazu and Asanao, was sold on the tour before being offered by mail order only. On May 23, they held a two-man live with Kein at Spotify O-East. Another two-man live, this time with Mucc, was held at the same venue on July 28. The two bands released a split single at the show, with Deadman's contribution being a song called "Neko to Blanket, Yorisoi-meguri au Ubugoe". Deadman released Genealogie der Moral, their first album of new material in 19 years that was recorded with kazu and Asanao, on March 30, 2024, and supported it with a 15-date nationwide tour. The self-cover album Living Hell, which features Miya and Aki (Sid) as guests, was also released on the same day, but sold only at concerts or via mail order.

=== 25th Anniversary (2025–present) ===
Deadman are celebrating their 25th anniversary in 2025. A three-date fan club members-only tour was held in February, followed by the ten-date To Be and Not to Be - Act 1 tour, which took them to five cities between March 29 to May 23. The four-track EP Lepidoptera wa Cyan Blue, which will only be sold at concerts and through the Maverick online store, will be released to commemorate the anniversary. As will the To Be and Not to Be -Cyan Blue- tour, which will begin the same day and end on August 31.

== Musical style ==
Deadman cites Buck-Tick, Chage and Aska and Kurt Cobain as inspiring them. Their music incorporates several different genres of rock, drawing heavily from alternative rock and indie rock. A style reminiscent of gothic rock, punk and post-punk can also be seen, in what is much of Deadman's musical sporadic-ism. Often incorporated into individual songs are several "movements" that seem to drift back and forth, with erratic vocals and sounds.

Mako's lyrics usually touch on the "psychological instability of mankind, the mortality of humans, and religion"; particularly, Christianity and Shintoism references are made often. He said that some of them are based on actual experiences that he had, and feels one should never lie when writing lyrics. The title of Deadman's album 701125 is a reference to the date author Yukio Mishima died, November 25, 1970, while the title of Genealogie der Moral was taken from Friedrich Nietzsche's On the Genealogy of Morality.

== Members ==
Current members

- Mako (眞呼) – vocals (2000–2006, 2019–present)
- Aie (stylized as aie) – guitar (2000–2006, 2019–present)

Former members

- Toki – drums (2000–2006)
- Yukino (ゆきの) – bass (2000–2001)
- Takamasa – bass (2001–2005)
- Kazuya (stylized as kazuya) – bass (2005–2006)

Support members

- Tetsu (テツ) – bass
- Kazu (stylized as kazu) – bass
- Asanao (晁直) – drums
- Akira Kano (叶亜樹良) – drums
- Lotto – drums

== Discography ==
=== Studio albums and mini-albums ===
- Site of Scaffold (November 21, 2001)
- No Alternative (March 8, 2003), Oricon Albums Chart Peak Position: No. 160
- 701125 (April 2004; sold on tour or by mail order)
- 701125+2 (June 8, 2005)
- In the Direction of Sunrise and Night Light (December 14, 2005) No. 189
- Genealogie der Moral (March 30, 2024)
- Lepidoptera wa Cyan Blue (鱗翅目はシアンブルー, Rinshimoku wa Shian Burū; July 21, 2025; EP, sold on tour or by mail order)

=== Other albums ===
- Jekyll and Hyde of Early Afternoon (昼下がりのジキルとハイド; April 11, 2002; split mini-album with Blast, includes both single versions)
- No Alternative 2.0 (November 30, 2009; remix album)
- I am Here (January 15, 2022; self-cover album) No. 67
- Dead Reminiscence (March 20, 2023; self-cover album, sold on tour or by mail order)
- Living Hell (March 30, 2024; self-cover album, sold on tour or by mail order)

=== Singles ===
- "Subliminal Effect" (April 25, 2001)
- "In Media" (August 20, 2001)
- "Jekyll and Hyde of Early Afternoon" (White Version, original songs July 27, 2002; split single with Blast)
- "Jekyll and Hyde of Early Afternoon" (Black Version, cover songs July 27, 2002; split single with Blast)
- "The Intolerable Existence In Suffering" (苦悩の中の耐え難い存在; demo sold only on June 21, 2002)
- "Family" (Osaka Edition, sold only on April 13, 2003)
- "Family" (Nagoya Edition, sold only on April 23, 2003)
- "Family" (Tokyo Edition, sold only on April 26, 2003)
- "Rainy Sunflower" (雨降りの向日葵; October 11, 2003), Oricon Singles Chart Peak Position: No. 102
- "Kafka" (カフカ; sold only on tour from January 13 – February 3, 2004)
- "°C+1" (sold only on March 10, 2004)
- "°C" (October 6, 2004) No. 85
- "When the Saints Go Marching In" (聖者ノ行進; March 9, 2005) No. 117
- "Rabid Dog" (distributed for free on tour from March 20 – April 16, 2023)
- "Ubugoe" (産声; July 28, 2023; split single with Mucc)

=== Home videos ===
- 2 Clips (April 2004; sold only on tour)
- 0605231830 (December 27, 2006)
- Endroll (December 27, 2006)
- Endroll 2006/Endroll 2022 (March 20, 2023; 1 Blu-ray and 2 CD boxset)
- Documentary of Genealogie der Moral (March 29, 2025; fan club members only)
