= Dezert (album) =

Studio album by Dezert
- Released: October 28, 2026
- Genre: Rock
- Length: 75:40
- Language: Japanese
- Label: Nippon Crown

Dezert chronology
The Heart Tree (2024)	Dezert (2026)

Dezert (stylized in all caps) is the second major studio album and the seventh overall by Japanese rock band Dezert. It was released on October 28, 2026, by Nippon Crown, consisting of two discs with ten tracks each.

The single "Toxic" was used as the theme song for the television program Buzz Rhythm 2, while "Hibana" was featured in the soundtrack of the miniseries Human Specimens. The song "Ongaku" (音楽) was produced by Ken of L'Arc-en-Ciel.

== Background and production ==
Makuhari Messe, where the group performed in March 2026, before taking time to reflect on their perspective for the future.

Between December 2025 and March 2026, differences in musical values and perspectives among the members intensified. The exhaustion resulting from the band's tour across all 47 prefectures of Japan, their concert at Nippon Budokan, and a lack of communication among the members contributed to the worsening disagreements, according to vocalist Chiaki and drummer Sora. Chiaki said that he felt he was working alone on the album's songwriting, while Sora explained that there was a discrepancy between his personal expectations and the band's reality, to the point that he considered leaving Dezert. Following their performance at Makuhari Messe on March 30, 2026, the members took approximately one and a half to two months to rest, reflect, and communicate, seeking to align their perspectives and reestablish common goals.

Chiaki had initially planned to release the album in August, but its release was eventually scheduled for October. He had begun working on it in 2025, however the production progressed in May 2026, when he asked the other members to contribute with songs as well. It was around this time that the title Dezert was considered; Chiaki stated that Sora may have been the first to suggest it. Although they considered titles related to the theme of living, the vocalist felt that those options were excessively heavy. The band name was ultimately chosen, with all members agreeing that it suited the band's 15-year career and the album's extensive track list. The members also emphasized that the title was not necessarily intended to represent a milestone, mentioning the possibility of a future DEZERT 2. The increased involvement of the other members in songwriting was also reflected in the limited EP Alternate4, released in September 2026, which featured four songs individually composed by each member.

During the development of the album's narrative, the theme of life, living and moving forward became principal points. The creation of the track "Ikiteyukone" influenced other parts of the album: the lyrics of "Suicide Heaven" were rewritten, while "Melancholia Train", which had not initially been planned for the album, was included because of its connection to the narrative. "Elama.", composed by Miyako with lyrics by Chiaki, also addresses themes related to life and death. The song "Talking", in turn, was written by Chiaki in response to the communication difficulties among the members.

== Promotion and release ==
On September 2, 2026, Dezert digitally released the double A-side single "Welcome To The End/Toxic", promoting and revealing details of their upcoming album Dezert. The music video for "Toxic" depicts the members gathered in a dimly lit hideout, interspersed with footage of their performance. On September 27, a live performance recording of "Ongaku" at Makuhari Messe was released, where the song had been performed live for the first time. The song "Elama." had also been performed live for the first time in September. On October 14, the band released a live recording of "Welcome To The End", recorded on September 27 at Kanadevia Hall in Tokyo. Two days later, they published a teaser of the album on their YouTube channel, directed by Sora.

The album was released in two editions: a limited edition, consisting of three CDs and a Blu-ray, and a regular edition, which includes two CDs and an M-Card. Both editions contain the same 20 songs across their two main discs, with ten tracks on each. The limited edition's third CD contains six additional tracks, including remixes of older songs, while its Blu-ray features two videos: a recording of the band's March 2026 concert at Makuhari Messe, which marked the end of their tour across all 47 prefectures of Japan, and a 60-minute documentary about the group's creative process and internal conflicts. In the regular edition, the concert recording is included via an M-Card, while the documentary is not included. On the day of the album's release, October 28, they also released the music video for "Ikiteyukone", the album's closing track, which runs for approximately six and a half minutes.

The album is being promoted through the Ikiteyukone tour, named after its closing track, which runs from November 1 to December 25, 2026, with the final date being a special Christmas concert. Details of the tour were announced on October 14, alongside the release of a new visual.

The album's promotion also included events at music stores and an acoustic performance in Tokyo, as well as autograph sessions in several Japanese cities, some of which were restricted to fan club members.

== Commercial performance ==
The album debuted at number 24 on the Oricon weekly albums chart, with estimated first-week sales of 2,290 copies. It also reached number 46 on the weekly combined albums chart.

== Track listing ==
Disc 1
No.	Title	Length
1.	"Welcome To The End"	3:04
2.	"Sora ga Aoku Moeteru" (空が青く燃えてる)	2:52
3.	"Mushusei" (「無修正。」)	3:09
4.	"Talking"	3:28
5.	"Melancholia Train" (メランコリアトレイン)	4:23
6.	"Bourei Doppel Rendezvous" (亡霊ドッペルランデヴー)	3:54
7.	"Elama."	4:46
8.	"My Unhappy Life"	3:16
9.	"Suicide Heaven" (スーサイドヘヴン)	3:19
10.	"Hibana" (「火花」)	3:06

Disc 2
No.	Title	Length
1.	"Ongaku" (「音楽」)	5:03
2.	"Toxic"	3:12
3.	"Live Future"	3:57
4.	"Swimming"	3:58
5.	"Ordinary" (オーディナリー)	3:27
6.	"Syunkou no Uta" (春光の詩)	4:14
7.	"Utsu Utsu Utsu" (鬱鬱鬱)	3:09
8.	"Dani, Dani, Go! Go!"	2:16
9.	"Syunkasyutou" (春夏秋冬)	4:10
10.	"Ikiteyukone" (生きてゆこうね)	6:31
Total length:		75:40

== Personnel ==
- Chiaki – vocals
- Miyako – guitar
- Sacchan – bass
- Sora – drums
