= Good Bye (Cali Gari album) =

Studio album by Cali Gari
- Released: June 22, 2003
- Genre: Experimental rock, gothic rock, post punk, noise rock, indie rock
- Length: 72:57
- Label: Victor Entertainment

Cali Gari chronology
8 (2003)	Good Bye (2003)	10 (2003)

Good Bye is Cali Gari's last album before their hiatus and return. It was composed of hard to find indies era songs, along with two new tracks.

== Track listing ==
1. "Good Bye" – 3:41
2. "-187-" – 1:24
3. "Kimi ga Saku Yama" – 4:43
4. "Fura Fura Skip" – 4:17
5. "Shitasaki 3-Pun Size" – 3:04
6. "3.2.1.0." – 3:03
7. "Kuso Carnival" – 6:56
8. "Erotopia" – 5:49
9. "Maguro" – 4:43
10. "Haikara•Setsubatsu•Haiso•Zessan" – 4:30
11. "Mahoraba Blues" – 3:38
12. "Siren" – 4:39
13. "Jelly" – 2:54
14. "Tsumetai Ame" – 6:29
15. "Seishun Kyousoukyoku" – 4:17
16. "Blue Film" – 5:28
17. "Itsuka, Dokoka de." – 6:42

== Personnel ==
- Shuuji Ishii – vocals
- Ao Sakurai – guitar
- Kenjirou Murai – bass
- Makoto Takei – drums
