= Emadara =

Studio album by Laputa
- Released: June 25, 1997
- Genre: Hard rock; heavy metal
- Length: 50:16
- Language: Japanese
- Label: EMI Music Japan
- Producer: Masanori Ohyama

Laputa chronology
Kagerō (1996)	Emadara (1997)	Jakō (1998)

Singles from Emadara
- 1. "Eve ~Last night for you~" Released: May 28, 1997

Emadara (絵～エマダラ～斑) is the third studio album by Japanese band Laputa, released on June 25, 1997, by EMI. It was produced by Laputa and Masanori Ohyama. The only single, "Eve ~Last night for you~", was used as theme song for the TBS Television program Count Down TV.

== Promotion and release ==
On June 9, 1997, Laputa held a free concert at the outside of Shinjuku Station, drawing between 3,000 and 5,000 people. According to Fool's Mate magazine, the concert was a success and served to promote their single "Eve", released on May 28, and an upcoming album in June 25. The album's release was followed by a fanclub only show at Meguro Rockmaykan a few weeks later.

== Style, writing and composition ==
Emadara has been characterized as a hard rock and heavy metal album. Middle Edge noted that while the album expands Laputa's musical style range, it retains their identity associated with the Nagoya kei style. Fool's Mate stated that Emadara has a hard to describe style.

In an interview with Fool's Mate, vocalist Aki said he wrote the lyrics in a fragmented way, not wanting to tie everything together clearly, drawing on his personal experiences for inspiration. He and the magazine also noted that the lyrics convey a sense of coldness and isolation, as if they were designed not to be easily understood.

The magazine noted to Kouichi that his guitar had a unique style, to which he confirmed that he did not want to be traditional and did it without following any influences, just by experimenting. Similar to Junji, who emphasized that they highlighted the bass sound. On the other hand, drummer Tomoi said they kept the drumming simple to maintain the balance, though it got harder to adjust the timing with the other instruments. Regarding the production, the members said they worked more collaboratively and experimented a lot on Emadara, regardless of public reception.

== Reception ==
In its review of the album, music magazine CD Journal states: "A vocal that sings a narcissistic romance with plenty of emotion", calling Laputa a "next generation visual rock hero candidate."

Middle Edge highlighted Aki's expressive vocals and Kouichi's guitar work, singling out the tracks "Alkaloid" and "Monochrome", as well as the single "Eve".

An issue of the music magazine Band Yarouze selected Emadara as one of the best albums from 1989 to 1998.

=== Commercial performance ===
The album peaked at No. 24 on the Oricon Albums Chart and remained on the chart for four weeks. It sold 28,520 copies while on the chart.

== Track listing ==
All titles are stylized in all caps.

No.	Title	Length
1.	"Alkaloid"	3:52
2.	"Lowspirited"	4:08
3.	"Monochrome"	4:39
4.	"Reincarnation Morning"	4:36
5.	"Move on Darkness"	5:06
6.	"B.C"	4:13
7.	"Mark Mars"	3:59
8.	"Over Mind"	5:01
9.	"Eve"	5:14
10.	"Stay"	3:58
11.	"Freesia"	5:25
Total length:		50:16

== Personnel ==
Laputa

- Aki – vocals
- Kouichi – guitar
- Junji – bass
- Tomoi – drums

Other personnel

- Masanori Ohyama – producer
