= Nagoya kei =

Subgenre of Japanese music

- Stylistic origins: Punk rock, gothic rock, alternative rock
- Cultural origins: Early 1990s, Nagoya, Japan
- Typical instruments: Guitar; bass; drums; keyboards

Nagoya kei (Japanese: 名古屋系; lit. "Nagoya Style") is a subgenre of the Japanese visual kei movement that developed in the early 1990s music scene of Nagoya, Japan. Initially, the term simply referred to musical groups from Nagoya, but because many of these bands had a dark and decadent atmosphere, it came to be used to describe a unique aesthetic style specific to the city. Considered darker and gloomier than visual kei both musically and lyrically, Nagoya kei takes its influences more so from western (specifically British) punk rock, gothic rock and alternative rock acts. The focus of the bands tends to be much less on costumes and makeup in favor of more complex musical compositions and concentration on the music itself. The term actually developed before visual kei was coined, and gradually died out as the latter gained more popularity.

== History ==
Early notable Nagoya kei acts include Silver~Rose (formed 1989), Kuroyume, and Merry Go Round (both formed 1991). According to Fanatic Crisis guitarist Shun, Silver~Rose and Kuroyume were the "big two" of the early scene. Shun cites Laputa, Rouage, and his own band Fanatic Crisis as being part of the second generation of Nagoya kei in the mid-1990s. In the late 1990s, many of the bands moved to Tokyo and signed to major record labels. When doing so, most also adopted a more commercial sound, like Fanatic Crisis, who went on to be considered one of the "big four" visual kei bands of the time. Keito Ozaki of Japanese pop culture website Real Sound wrote that many Nagoya kei bands eventually diverge into different directions; Kuroyume turned to punk rock and hardcore punk, Laputa turned to a digital sound, Fanatic Crisis went pop, and Merry Go Round went in a "maniacal, ero guro and underground direction."

Later notable bands include kein, deadman, Blast, deathgaze and Gullet. The scene has a history of bands frequently collaborating, swapping members, and forming new acts together following disbandments. There is often much debate on whether or not an act is considered Nagoya kei. Since the term visual kei has become mainstream, newer bands are generally not considered Nagoya kei. For example, members of Lynch. (formed in 2004) disagree with being labeled as such, with vocalist Hazuki claiming that Nagoya kei's sound does not include "modern heaviness" like they do. However, Ozaki wrote that Lynch. has more than a few traits in common with Nagoya kei. Particularly noting how, due to the popularity of Dir En Grey, many contemporary bands have heavier sounds with low-tuned guitars, including those in Nagoya. Despite not being from Nagoya, Arlequin (formed 2013) were influenced by its bands and have labeled themselves the "next generation of Nagoya kei."
