= Cali Gari =

Japanese visual kei rock band

- Origin: Ibaraki, Japan
- Genres: Experimental rock, post-punk, noise rock, gothic rock, alternative rock
- Years active: 1993–2003, 2009–2028
- Label: Victor
- Members: Shuuji Ishii; Ao Sakurai; Kenjirou Murai
- Website: Official site

Cali Gari (stylized as cali≠gari) is a Japanese visual kei experimental rock band formed with the concept erotic grotesque.

== History ==
Cali Gari was founded in 1993 and named after the horror film The Cabinet of Dr. Caligari. The band's debut single came out in 1994 and their first major single was "Dai 7 Jikkenshitsu Yokokuban -Maguro-" released April 2002. The band paused activities after their last concert on June 22, 2003.

During the band's hiatus, Shuuji started a solo project called goatbed. Makoto and Ao went to form LAB. THE BASEMENT. Makoto has since quit the band to join Cyanotype. In 2004, Kenjirou went on to join Sex Machineguns for two years and became is a live support member for Coaltar of the Deepers.

In June 2009, the band reunited on stage at Zepp Tokyo and released a greatest hits album and a live DVD later that year. Their official fan club reopened in spring 2010.

The band's first post-reunion album, 10, was released on August 26, 2009, along with the double single, "9 -tou- hen" and "9 School Zone hen", released a month earlier. This marked the first full-length album from the band in 6 years.

In March 2020, Cali Gari was set to go on a joint tour with deadman. However, those dates were cancelled due to the COVID-19 pandemic in Japan. The tour eventually took place in June 2021, during which the two bands released the collaborative song "Shikeidai no Elevator".

In March 2026 Cali Gari announced that they are set to disband on September 10, 2028 after 35 years of activity.

== Lineup ==
- Shuuji Ishii (石井秀仁) – vocals (2000–2003, 2009–present)
- Ao Sakurai (桜井青) – guitar (1993–2003, 2009–present)
- Kenjirou Murai (村井研次郎) – bass (1996–2003, 2009–present)

=== Former members ===
- Kureiju (紅梁樹) - vocals (1993)
- Shin (真) - vocals (1993–1995)
- Shuuji (秀児) - vocals (1996–2000)
- Keiji (圭児) - bass (1993–1994, 1996)
- Kazuya (和也) - bass (1995)
- Katsumi (克弥) - drums (1993–1999)
- Makoto Takei (武井誠) - drums (1999–2003, 2009–2014)

Shuuji left cali≠gari on June 1, 2000, and was replaced by Shuuji Ishii of float. Due to their identical names there was some confusion in the beginning and the new vocalist, Shuuji Ishii, always introduced himself as "the OTHER Shuuji".

Timeline

== Discography ==
Albums and EPs

- Dai 1 Jikkenshitsu (January 28, 1994)
- Dai 2 Jikkenshitsu (August 17, 1996)
- Dai 3 Jikkenshitsu (June 6, 1998)
- Dai 4 Jikkenshitsu (December 12, 1998)
- Dai 5 Jikkenshitsu (June 27, 1999)
- Blue Film (July 7, 2000)
- Saikyouiku -Hidari- (January 1, 2001)
- Saikyouiku -Migi- (January 1, 2001)
- Dai 6 Jikkenshitsu (March 14, 2001)
- Cali Gari Janai Janai (December 20, 2001)
- Dai 7 Jikkenshitsu (April 4, 2002)
- 8 (March 5, 2003)
- Good Bye (June 22, 2003)
- 10 (August 26, 2009)
- 11 Janai Ryoshin Ban (March 17, 2010)
- 11 (January 11, 2012)
- 12 (March 11, 2015)
- 13 (May 10, 2017)
- 14 (December 19, 2018)
- 15 (December 1, 2021)
- 16 (June 21, 2023)
- 17 (June 26, 2024)
- 17.5 (September 11, 2024)
- 18 (September 24, 2025)

Singles

- "禁色" (Jan 1, 1994)
- "Kimi Ga Saku Yama" (May 5, 2000)
- "Dai 7 Jikkenshitsu Yokokuban -Maguro-" (April 4, 2002)
- "Dai 2 Jikkenshitsu Kaiteiban" (July 16, 2002)
- "Dai 2 Jikkenshitsu Kaiteiban -Kaiteiyokokuban-" (March 14, 2002)
- "Shitasaki 3-pun Size" (October 30, 2002)
- "Seishun Kyousoukyoku" (February 21, 2003)
- "9 -tou- Hen" (July 22, 2009)
- "9 School Zone Hen" (July 22, 2009)
- "Zoku, Tsumetai Ame" (?, 2009)
- "Trationdemons" (?, 2010)
- "Kyoujin Nikki" (?, 2011)
- "#_2" (November 16, 2011)
- "Haru no Hi" (April 4, 2013)

== Videography ==
- Soumatou (VHS, August 8, 1998)
- Fuyu no Hi (VHS, December 27, 1999)
- Promotion 1 (VHS, May 19, 2000)
- Kyuu (DVD, September 21, 2003)
- Jyuu (DVD, December 2, 2009)
- Shiseru Seishun (DVD, October 8, 2014)
- Tokyo cali≠gari Land Shonichi 2014.02.01 (DVD, October 8, 2014)
- Tokyo cali≠gari Land Rakubi 2014.02.02 (DVD, October 8, 2014)
- Dai 7 Ki Shuryo (DVD, November 16, 2016)
- Kaiso, Suiren to Himawari (DVD, September 13, 2017)
- Re:13 -The worst foe you meet would be always you yourself- 2017.09.23 Hibiya Yagai Dai Ongakudo (DVD, May 23, 2018)
- Oyasuminasai - 15th Caliversary 2018 LAST GIGS 2018.04.04 Differ Ariake (DVD, September 14, 2018)
