= Rouage =

Japanese visual kei rock band

- Origin: Nagoya, Aichi, Japan
- Label: Universal Music Japan
- Members: Kazushi; Rayzi; Shono
- Past members: Kaiki; Yuki; Rika

Rouage (stylized as ROUAGE) was a Japanese visual kei rock band formed in Nagoya in 1993, active until 2001. They were an important band to the visual kei scene of the 90s, being credited as one of the founders of the subgenre Nagoya kei.

== History ==
Rouage, whose name means gear in French, was formed in December 1993 in Nagoya by vocalist Kazushi, guitarists Rika and Rayzi and drummer Shono. In 1994, the bassist Kaiki left the band Silver~Rose and joined Rouage. Their debut release was the single "Silk", in February. Rouage released a self-titled debut album in March, limited to 5000 copies. A reprint with more 5000 copies went on sale in July.

In 1995, Kaiki left the band and the group considered breaking up, even playing a farewell show. That didn't happen and in a twist Rouage debuted on a major label in April with the single "Queen" released by Universal Music Japan. In June, they released Bible, their best-selling album.

In 1996, their second major single "insomnia" was used as the theme song for the ANB television show mew. The band Lin covered it for the album CRUSH!3-90's V-Rock best hit cover LOVE songs, which features newer visual kei bands covering love songs by important visual kei bands from the 90s. After the release of "insomnia" in August, bassist Yuki joined the band.

In March 1997 Rouage released the album Mind. Soon after, Yuki disappeared from the band and since then, Rouage has worked only with support bass musicians. After embarking on a big tour, they released the album Children on December 3. "Endless Loop" was used as opening theme of Legend of Basara anime. Diaura covered the song for the album Counteraction -V-Rock covered Visual Anime songs Compilation-, which features newer visual kei bands covering anime songs by older visual kei bands. Early on the following year they embarked on Children's Room tour, with fifteen shows across the country. On July 16 they played at the Shock Wave Illusion festival with bands like Dir En Grey and Pierrot. In 2000, Rika left the band.

After Shono left the band in February 2001, Rouage officially broke up. In 2006, the albums Bible, Children, Lab, Mind and Soup were re-released. They also considered re-releasing their live albums, but Rika didn't approve.

== Members ==
- Kazushi - vocals (1993–2001)
- Rayzi - guitar (1993–2001)
- Shono - drums (1993–2001)

Former

- Kaiki - bass (1994–1995)
- Yuki - bass (1996–1997)
- Rika - guitar (1993–2000)

== Discography ==
Title	Release	Oricon chart
Rouage	July 20, 1994	-
Bible	June 6, 1996	14
Mind	March 5, 1997	15
Children	December 3, 1997	25
Soup	November 11, 1998	16
Culture	March 17, 1999	29
Lab	May 24, 2000	33
