= Laputa (band) =

Japanese Nagoya kei rock band

- Origin: Nagoya, Aichi, Japan
- Genres: Gothic rock; post-punk; hard rock; heavy metal; EDM; electronic rock
- Years active: 1993–2004
- Labels: Toshiba-EMI; Nippon Crown
- Members: aki Kouichi; Junji; Tomoi
- Past members: Hiro; Hideno; Kusuba
- Website: laputa-all-burst.jp

Laputa was a Japanese Nagoya kei rock band, active from 1993 to 2004. The band chose its name from the flying island in Gulliver's Travels and tried to portray a similar unrealistic view of the world with their performance. Their 1997 album Emadara was named one of the top albums from 1989 to 1998 in a 2004 issue of the music magazine Band Yarouze.

== History ==
Laputa was formed in July 1993 by aki and Tomoi, high school friends who were previously in the band Ai SICK FACE together. Laputa recorded their two demos "Saddist no Yume" and "Naraku no Soko"(Okazaki Yukito from Eternal Elysium worked as an engineer.) in later 1993. They met some success in 1995 in the visual indie scene with their first indie album Memai, and shot a music video for Vertigo. They released a mini-album (Kurumeku Haijin) in 1996, and also released a live video (Hakoniwa) featuring performances from the concert at SHIBUYA ON AIR WEST from the Paradoxical Reality TOUR IV.

With their increasing popularity in the visual indie scene, Laputa caught the attention of big record companies and signed to the major label Toshiba-EMI in August 1996. Laputa released their first major single GARASU NO SHOUZOU in September 1996, which peaked at #34 on the Oricon singles chart. In October Laputa's first major album KAGEROU was released. Laputa released 4 more albums and several videos in the following 4 years.

In 2000, Laputa released a collection of their B-sides (c/w songs) "Coupling Collection + xxxk [1996-1999 singles]". They also released a three-disc best-of album "3DISC BEST ~1995-1999 except Coupling Collection~", which featured 32 songs in all including Laputa's eight major singles and 24 other songs. After these releases, Laputa left Toshiba-EMI and signed to a smaller major label Nippon-Crown.

While on Nippon Crown Laputa released 4 albums/mini-albums and 3 singles which made it on to the top 50 of the Oricon charts. Glitter, a mini-album which was released in 2002, had a more electronic-oriented direction.

Laputa's lead songwriter Kouichi was reportedly in a hospital or clinic for much of 2002. Because of this, he wrote only two songs on the New Temptation album, and Laputa's tour for the album consisted of less than ten concert dates. Junji wrote more of the songs on 誘～New Temptation～惑 than any other member, and would remain Laputa's lead songwriter for the rest of their career. Tomoi also began to contribute more in writing songs and lyrics.

In May 2004 Laputa announced through their fanclub that they were disbanding, citing a desire for each of them to evolve. They released a best-of CD+DVD of their material from their years on the Nippon-Crown label titled "BEST AL+CLIPS 2000~2004" on July 28, 2004, toured from August to September, and played their last live on September 5, 2004, at Shibuya Koukaido. A DVD of the last live titled "ALL BURST" was released on December 15, 2004.

After Laputa's disbanding all four musicians stayed in the music business and three of them started solo projects. Aki began to release material under his own name, while Kouichi started Everlasting-K and Junji started HALATION. On the other hand, Tomoi first joined MILK FUDGE, and then played support for JILS. After JILS disbanded, he formed a new band, called C4 in 2008, together with Junji, JILS' guitarist Shunsuke and singer Toki, formerly of 90s' visual kei band Kill=slayd.

On August 29, 2023, Aki died due to a sudden illness at the age of 52.

== Members ==
- aki (October 10, 1970 ~ August 29, 2023) – vocals
- Kouichi – guitar ex.Silver-Rose (Note: Silver-Rose was one of the most influential group in the early nagoya kei scene.)
- Junji – bass
- Tomoi – drums

Former members

- Hiro – guitar
- Hideno – guitar
- Kusuba – bass

== Musical style and influence ==
Musically the essence of the band sound was extracted from "Dark, Hard, and Melodious". Their sound is characterized by Kouichi's unique chord progressions and aki's high-pitched vocals.

=== Influence ===
==== aki ====
aki cited Morrie from Dead End as a main influence on his vocal style. He covered Japanese metal bands in his high school days, such as Dead End, Loudness, 44 Magnum, Gastunk, Reaction, Marino, Sniper and Tilt.

==== Kouichi ====
Kouichi stated he was influenced by Yngwie Malmsteen and Takeshi Tsuji from Justy-Nasty. As a solo artist, Everlasting-K, he admired hide, describing him as "my eternal goal".

When asked what bands he listened to in his high school days, Kouichi mentioned Vow Wow, Anthem and Earthshaker.

==== Junji ====
His early influences included Duran Duran, Bon Jovi, Bauhaus, Dead Can Dance and The Cure. Junji was later into electronic dance music and trip hop.

==== Tomoi ====
His style was mostly influenced by Masafumi Minato from Dead End and Akira Ōta from Kinniku Shōjo Tai. He stated that he was into bands such as Duran Duran, Toto and Journey, and covered Seikima-II and glam metal in his high school days.

== Legacy ==
Laputa is credited with "creating the early nagoya kei style along with Kuroyume", combining the sounds of heavy metal music and gothic rock.

Musicians that have cited Kouichi as an influence include Ruiza and Hide-Zou from D, Kei from Diaura and Tsurugi from Sadie.

Takayoshi Ohmura from Babymetal stated that "I love Laputa so much." and later joined C4. Umi from vistlip said that Laputa's major first single "硝子の肖像 (Glass no Shouzou)" got him into visual kei and started playing in the band. Yomi from Nightmare covered Laputa in his high school days. Kaya covered their song "揺れながら… (Yurenagara...)" on the compilation album "CRUSH!-90’s V-Rock best hit cover songs-".

== Discography ==
- Memai (眩～めまい～暈; February 24, 1995)
- Kagerō (蜉～かげろう～蝣; October 23, 1996)
- Emadara (絵～エマダラ～斑; June 25, 1997)
- Jakō (麝～ジャコウ～香; March 18, 1998)
- Cakera (翔～カケラ～裸; June 9, 1999)
- Heaven (楽～ヘブン～園; March 16, 2001)
- New Temptation (誘～New Temptation～惑; July 24, 2002)
