= Visual kei =

Category of Japanese musicians

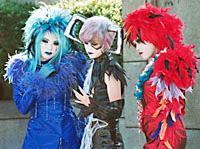
- Fans cosplaying as members of visual kei band Malice Mizer
- Stylistic origins: Glam rock; shock rock; heavy metal; punk rock; gothic rock; new wave; progressive rock; alternative rock; electronic; pop
- Cultural origins: Early 1980s, Japan

Subgenres
- Eroguro kei

Local scenes
- Nagoya

Other topics
- Japanese popular culture; Japanese street fashion

Visual kei (Japanese: ヴィジュアル系 or ビジュアル系, Hepburn: Vijuaru kei or Bijuaru kei; lit. "Visual Style"), abbreviated v-kei (V系, bui kei), is a subculture and category of Japanese musicians that have a strong focus on extravagant stage costumes that originated in Japan during the early 1980s. Koji Dejima of Bounce wrote that visual kei is not a specific sound, but rather it "revolves around the creation of a band's unique worldview and/or stylistic beauty through visual expressions in the form of makeup and fashion". While visual kei acts can be of any music genre, it originated with bands influenced by glam rock, heavy metal, punk rock and gothic rock.

Visual kei was pioneered by groups such as X Japan, Dead End, Buck-Tick, D'erlanger, and Color, and gained further notoriety in the 1990s through the success of groups like Luna Sea, Glay, L'Arc-en-Ciel, and Malice Mizer. The movement's success continued through the 2000s with Gackt and more musically broad bands such as Dir En Grey, the Gazette, Alice Nine, and Versailles, a period which some critics term "neo-visual kei" (ネオ・ヴィジュアル系). Many acts tone down their appearance upon achieving mainstream success, calling into question whether they are still to be considered visual kei.

== Etymology ==
The term "visual kei" was derived from one of X Japan's slogans, "Psychedelic Violence Crime of Visual Shock", seen on the cover of their second studio album Blue Blood (1989). This derivation is credited as being coined by Seiichi Hoshiko, the founding editor of Shoxx magazine, which was founded in 1990 as the first publication devoted to the subject. Hoshiko considers visual kei a distinctive Japanese music genre and defined it "as the music itself along with all the visual aspects of it."

Hoshiko explained in a 2018 interview with JRock News that visual kei was technically coined, or at least inspired by, X Japan's lead guitarist, Hide. Hoshiko also said that at the time they were called 'Okeshou Kei' (お化粧系, Okeshō Kei; "Makeup Style"), "but it simply felt... too cheap... Even though X Japan was a big band and people used the term 'Okeshou kei' to describe them, the term was still lacking substance, I didn't like the term at all! Because of this, I tried to remind all the writers to not use this term as 'They are not okeshou kei, they are visual-shock kei'. From there, it went from 'Visual-shock kei' to 'Visual-kei' to 'V-kei'. After we spread the word, fans naturally abbreviated it to 'V-kei'. The Japanese love to abbreviate everything as a matter of fact."

== History ==
=== 1980–1992: Origins and success ===
Visual kei emerged in the 1980s Japanese underground music scene, pioneered by bands such as X Japan, Dead End, Buck-Tick, D'erlanger, and Color. Music journalist Taiyo Sawada noted the musical diversity of the scene's early acts; some had strong metal influence, some were influenced by 1980s goth and new wave, while others evolved from hardcore punk. Japanese pop culture website Real Sound wrote that similarities between the appearances and behavior of the founders of visual kei and members of the yankī delinquent subculture are often noted. The movement designated a new form of Japanese rock music influenced by Western hard rock and glam metal acts like Kiss, Hanoi Rocks, Mötley Crüe and Twisted Sister. In The George Mason Review, Megan Pfeifle described the movement as being roughly divided into two generations, with the first in three transitional eras, of which the first era lasted just over a decade.

"Danse Macabre"
Sample of "Danse Macabre" (1987), a hard rock song from Top 15 charting album Ghost of Romance by Dead End.

"Just One More Kiss"
Buck-Tick's 1988 single "Just One More Kiss" is first successful single by a visual kei band, reaching Top 10 on the charts.

In the late 1980s and until the mid-1990s, visual kei received increasing popularity throughout Japan, when album sales from such bands started to reach record numbers. The first band with recordings that achieved notable success was Dead End, whose independent album Dead Line (1986) sold over 20,000 copies, and whose major label debut album Ghost of Romance (1987) released by Victor Entertainment reached No. 14 on the Oricon Albums Chart. That same year, Buck-Tick released their major debut Sexual XXXXX! through the same record label. Dead End even had albums Ghost of Romance and Shámbara (1988) released by American label Metal Blade Records, with radio station and MTV exposure in the United States. In 1990, D'erlanger's major debut album Basilisk reached No. 5 on the Oricon chart, but they and Dead End both disbanded that same year.

In 1988 and 1989, Buck-Tick and X Japan started to gain mainstream success that continues to present-day. Buck-Tick's single "Just One More Kiss" reached No. 6, while "Aku no Hana" is the first visual kei No. 1 single on the Oricon Singles Chart; their studio albums Seventh Heaven (1988) and Taboo (1989) charted at No. 3 and 1 respectively. Buck-Tick were the first Japanese rock band to hold a concert at the Tokyo Dome. They continued to have success, with nearly all of their subsequent albums topping the charts until 1995 and later reaching the top ten on the charts. X Japan's first album, the independently released Vanishing Vision, reached No. 19 in 1988, making them the first indie band to appear on the main Oricon Albums Chart. Their second and major label debut album Blue Blood (1989) reached No. 6 and has since sold 712,000 copies. Their third and best-selling album Jealousy was released in 1991, topping the charts and sold over 1 million copies. X Japan went on to release two more number one studio albums, Art of Life (1993) and Dahlia (1996). In 1992, X Japan tried to launch an attempt to enter the American market, even signing with Atlantic Records for a US album release, but this ultimately did not happen.

Two record labels formed in 1986, Extasy Records (Tokyo) and Free-Will (Osaka), were instrumental in promoting the visual kei scene. Extasy was created by X Japan drummer and leader Yoshiki. The label signed bands, not limited to visual kei acts, that would go on to make marks on the Japanese music scene, including Zi:Kill, Tokyo Yankees and Ladies Room. Luna Sea and Glay, who both went on to sell millions of records, with Glay being one of Japan's best-selling musical acts, had their first albums released by Extasy in 1991 and 1994 respectively. Free-Will was founded by Color vocalist and leader Dynamite Tommy. While at the time not as popular as Extasy, the labelhad many moderately successful acts, such as By-Sexual and Kamaitachi.

=== 1993–2000: Expansion and decline ===
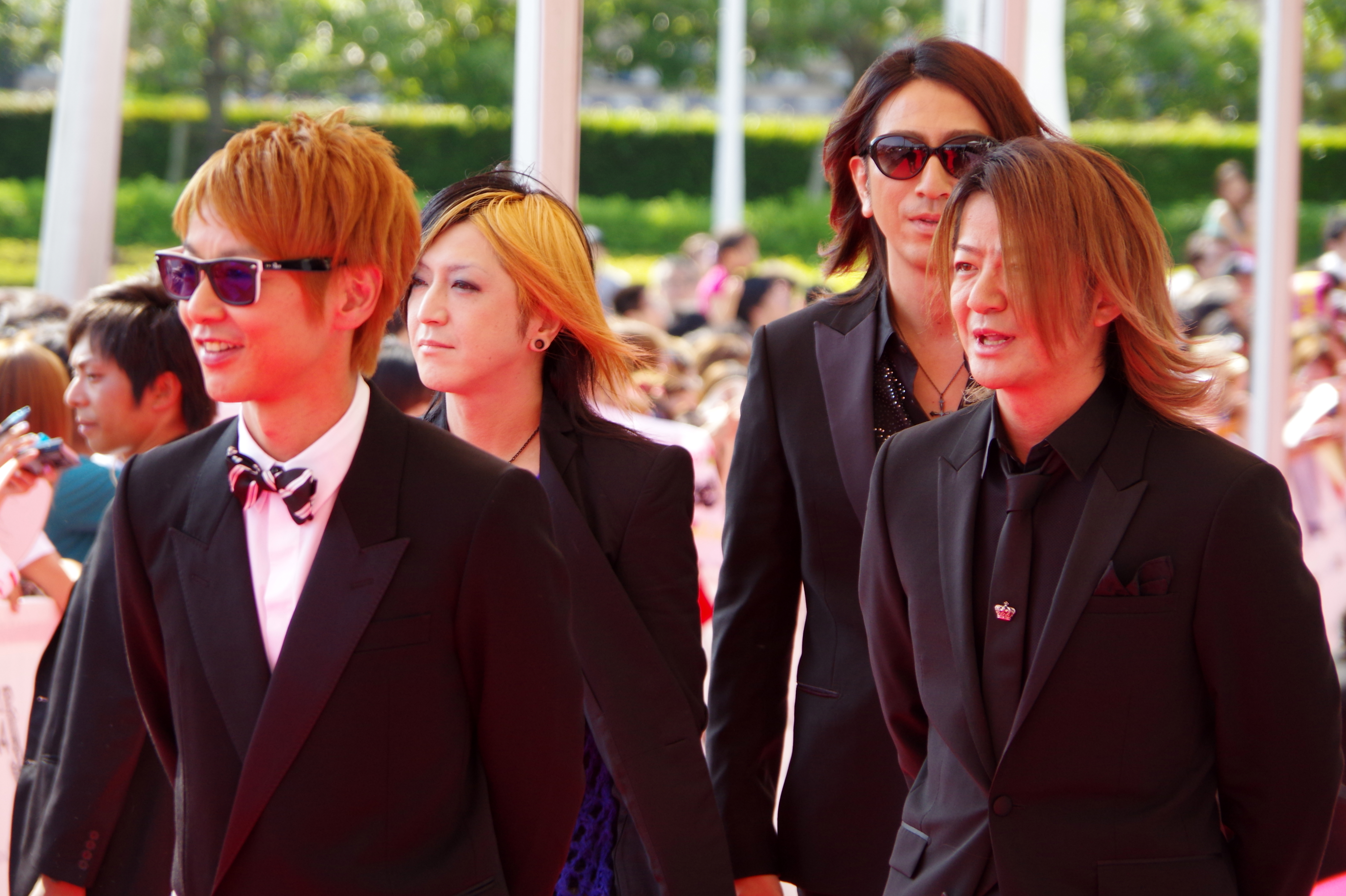
Originally a visual kei band, Glay went on to become one of the best-selling musical acts in Japan.

Pfeifle described the second transition era as beginning in 1993 with bands such as L'Arc-en-Ciel, Glay (although formed in 1988, their first album was released in 1994) and Malice Mizer. They gained mainstream awareness, although they were not as commercially successful, except for L'Arc-en-Ciel and Glay whose later huge success was accompanied by a drastic change in their appearance; today, the two bands are often not associated with visual kei. Around 1995, visual kei bands experienced a booming success in the general population, which lasted for four years. According to Pfeifle, the third transition era began by bands such as La'cryma Christi, Penicillin and Rouage achieving moderate success. At the time, "the big four of visual kei" were Malice Mizer, La'cryma Christi, Shazna and Fanatic Crisis.

Around the early 1990s, a visual kei scene that placed more emphasis on music rather than fashion arose in the city of Nagoya, and as such was later dubbed Nagoya kei. Silver-Rose (formed in 1989) and Kuroyume (formed in 1991) were described as the "Nagoya big two" in the underground scene, and alongside Laputa (formed in 1993) are credited with "creating the early Nagoya kei style." Kuroyume's albums Feminism (1995) and Fake Star (1996) both topped the Oricon chart. During the 1990s, several other conceptual subgenres like Eroguro kei (notably represented by Cali Gari), Angura kei (underground style, wearing traditional kimono or Japanese uniforms) and Ouji kei or Kodona kei (prince style or boy style, notably Plastic Tree) emerged. In 1998, Pierrot released their major debut single, and Dir En Grey's first three major singles were released with the help of Yoshiki the following year. Pierrot and Dir En Grey were called "the big two" in the scene at that time.

By the late 1990s, the mainstream popularity of visual kei was declining. Luna Sea went on a year-long hiatus in 1997 before disbanding in 2000, while X Japan disbanded at the end of 1997 and their lead guitarist Hide died the following year. In 1999, Malice Mizer's drummer Kami died after the departure of singer Gackt, who with a toned down appearance became one of the most popular and successful visual kei acts. L'Arc-en-Ciel publicly distanced themselves from the movement, although in 2012 they were partly promoted internationally as a visual kei band. In 1998, Billboard's Steve McClure commented that "To a certain extent, Hide's death means the end of an era, X were the first generation of visual kei bands, but the novelty has worn off. For the next generation of bands, it's like: That's it. The torch has been passed to us." As other bands could not meet financial expectations, most major companies backed out of the movement, and it once again became an underground style often associated with the rebellious generation, non-conforming to proper society.

=== 2001–2009: International expansion and neo-visual kei ===
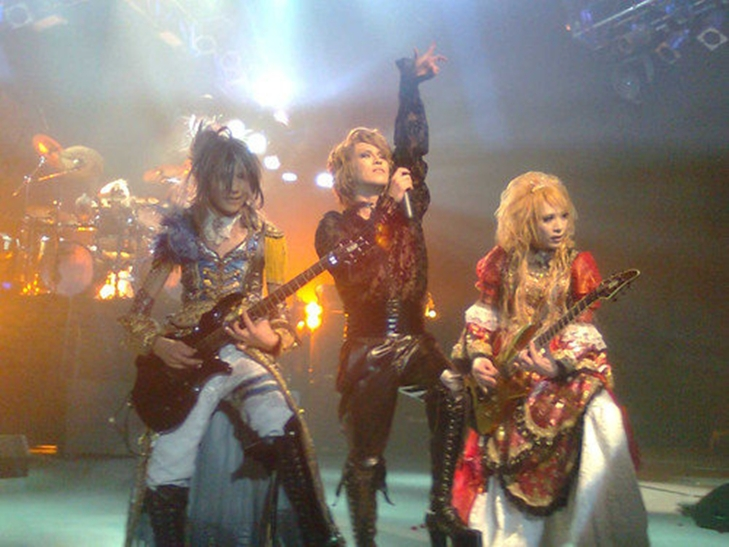
Versailles performing in 2010, wearing costumes inspired by the French Rococo style

A second generation emerged in small visual kei-specific live houses managed by record companies like PS Company (Free-Will) and Maverick DC Group. The difference between the first and second generation is that the second has no straightforward music style, ranging from metal to pop, but still seemingly focused on heavy rock genres; the fashion and gender ambiguities are of central importance. Although economically not very significant in the Japanese music market, it became the first Japanese alternative music to succeed on an international scale.

Notable newer visual kei bands include Dir En Grey, the Gazette, Alice Nine, D'espairsRay and Girugamesh, as well as solo performer Miyavi, who have all performed overseas. Veterans of the scene also established new acts, such as Malice Mizer's Mana with his band Moi dix Mois and three members of Pierrot forming Angelo. In 2007, visual kei was revitalized as Yoshiki, Gackt, Sugizo and Miyavi formed the supergroup Skin, Luna Sea performed a one-off performance and X Japan officially reunited with a new single and a world tour. With these developments, visual kei bands enjoyed a boost in public awareness, with acts formed around 2004 having been described by some media as "neo-visual kei". From this generation the subgenre "oshare kei" (オシャレ系) emerged, in which the musicians produce upbeat pop rock and wear bright, colorful attire. Pioneers of this style include Baroque, Kra, Charlotte and An Cafe.

Although the first international concert by a visual kei act was held in Taiwan by Luna Sea in 1999, it was not until 2002 that many visual kei bands started to perform worldwide, with the initial interest coming from Japanese-themed conventions in the West like A-Kon where bands like Psycho le Cemu performed. Dir En Grey was especially well-received, having performed on U.S. nu metal band Korn's Family Values Tour 2006. In 2007, the Jrock Revolution event was held in Los Angeles and featured visual kei bands. Although some bands like the Gazette have played at the Tokyo Dome (not at full capacity), the majority of acts play in much smaller venues like Shibuya O-East. In 2009 the V-Rock Festival at Makuhari Messe was reported as the "world's largest Visual Kei music festival" gathering over 50 "visual artists", although this included some Western acts like Marilyn Manson. A second V-Rock Festival was held in 2011 at Saitama Super Arena.

=== 2009–present: Reunions and further expansion ===
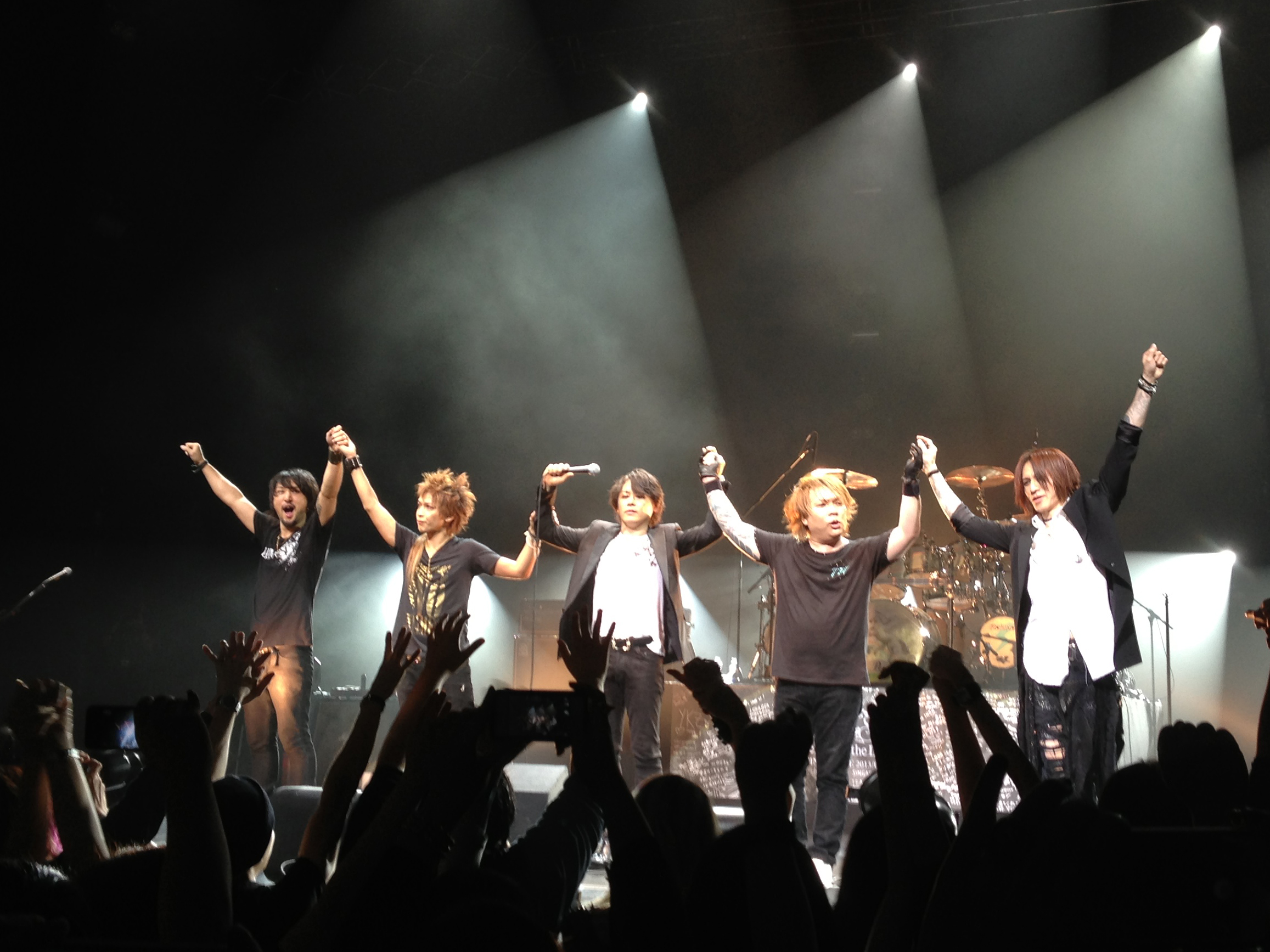
Luna Sea in Singapore, 2013

Dead End officially reunited in 2009 and La'cryma Christi, which disbanded in 2007, reunited for an anniversary tour in 2010. Kiyoharu announced the reformations of both Kuroyume and Sads, and Luna Sea reunited and began a world tour.

As an epilogue to their 25th anniversary, Luna Sea hosted a rock festival titled Lunatic Fest on 27 and 28 June 2015, with an estimated 60,000 fans attending. Held at Makuhari Messe, there were three stages and 12 artists, most visual kei acts including X Japan, Dead End, Dir En Grey, Siam Shade and Tokyo Yankees the first night, and Aion, Buck-Tick, D'erlanger, Glay and Mucc the second night.

A large three-day visual kei rock festival titled Visual Japan Summit was held at Makuhari Messe between October 14–16, 2016. Luna Sea hosted another two-day Lunatic Fest at Makuhari Messe on June 23 and 24, 2018.

According to sales figures from online music store CDJapan, some of the internationally popular visual kei acts on the late 2010s include the Gazette, Kamijo, Nocturnal Bloodlust, Versailles, Jupiter, Mejibray, lynch., Dimlim, Matenrou Opera, Miyavi, D, Diaura, Dadaroma, Initial'L, A9, Buck-Tick, Yoshiki, Hyde, Luna Sea, Mucc, Hizaki and Gackt.

In 2021, visual kei journalist Chiaki Fujitani noted how newer acts were combining visual kei with other elements to create originality. She cited Nocturnal Bloodlust's muscular vocalist Hiro for defying the usual delicate appearance of visual kei musicians; 0.1g no Gosan for utilizing tropes of underground idols, such as playing tug of war with fans during concerts; Choke for their avant-garde form of rap metal; and former D'espairsRay drummer Tsukasa Mogamigawa for being the first visual kei enka singer. Mai Yajima's singing style has been referred to as "enka rock". Moi dix Mois, Versailles, D and Matenrou Opera teamed up for the four-date Japanese Visual Metal tour in late 2023 and released a collaborative single.

== Characteristics ==
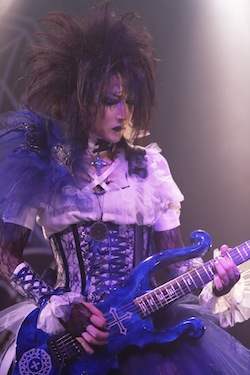
Many visual kei musicians utilize androgyny or cross-dressing in their aesthetics, such as Mana.

Sources have variously referred to visual kei as a movement, scene, subculture, and music genre. It is not associated with any one musical style, as visual kei artists play a variety of genres including punk rock, heavy metal, pop, electronica, classical, and industrial. Instead, it is defined by an act's emphasis on aesthetics, particularly their fashion and use of makeup, with a number of visual kei artists and critics describing it as a freedom of expression and experimental fashion. Koji Dejima of Bounce wrote that visual kei "revolves around the creation of a band's unique worldview and/or stylistic beauty through visual expressions in the form of makeup and fashion". Sources have also noted that visual kei is a "uniquely Japanese" phenomenon.

Visual kei musicians often have elaborate, dyed hair, extravagant costumes, frequently with leather, PVC or lace, or based on traditional Japanese clothing pieces, and excessive jewelry. Many musicians make use of androgynous and gender bending aesthetics, with some of its male musicians cross-dressing in a manner similar to traditional Japanese onnagata performers. This rose to prominence through the success of Malice Mizer, whose guitarist Mana performed dressed as a woman and singer Gackt was a "living specimen of bishōnen". Such aesthetics are reminiscent of those seen in shōjo manga. Different artists have taken aesthetic influence from various fashion styles including glam, metalhead, punk, goth and cyberpunk. Dejima generalized visual kei as being based on the androgynous sensibilities of the New Romantic movement and Los Angeles metal scene, or the goth subculture, and topped off with elements from "strange" and "taboo" interests such as Lolita, psychopathy, and the occult. Many subsects of visual kei exist to describe separate styles. Eroguro kei is one such subsect which is influenced by BDSM and horror imagery, while angura kei makes use of traditional Japanese clothing styles like kimonos. Many acts tone-down their appearance upon achieving mainstream success, calling into question whether they are still to be considered visual kei.

In addition to the visual aspects, visual kei artists often have a wider "decorative fantasy" concept or context and their on-stage performances are "overwhelming, multisensory experiences whose constructed nature is made apparent to audiences" (e.g. Gackt's career claim about being a vampire).

== Criticism ==
There has been criticism directed at newer visual kei bands for having lost the spirit of their forefathers by copying each other in design and sound, and becoming all the same. As far back as 1998, Neil Strauss reported that to visual kei bands "after X" makeup and outrageous looks became "more important than music." Several musicians have expressed their discontent; in 2008, Kirito (Pierrot, Angelo) said "now it's more like people are dressing up a certain way because they want to be visual kei or look visual kei. They are doing it to look like others instead of doing it to look different. This is obviously very different from when we started out more than ten years ago," while Sugizo (Luna Sea) stated in 2010 that "they cannot make good sounds and music is more like a hobby for them. I cannot feel their soul in the music."

Although almost from the newer generation himself, Dir En Grey bassist Toshiya said in 2010 "to be honest, when we first started and we were wearing a lot of makeup on stage and stuff, there were a lot of bands doing that at the time in Japan and people thought it was cool. But not anymore, ha ha." and added "the music was so unique, too – bands like X Japan. At that time, there weren't any two bands that sounded alike; these days everyone sounds exactly the same." Kenzi (Kamaitachi, The Dead Pop Stars, Anti Feminism) commented in 2009 that "back in the day, there were bands, but people would try to do things differently. Nowadays, there's one band and everyone copies off of them," with Free-Will founder and Color frontman Tommy concluding with "I don't think our breed of visual kei exists anymore." In 2013, Kiyoharu (Kuroyume, Sads) said that although he, Ryuichi (Luna Sea) and Hyde (L'Arc-en-Ciel) were influenced by Morrie (Dead End), they "sublimated each other" inventing something new, but the younger generation is more imitative. He proposed that from Morrie's perspective this probably appears to be a "copy of his copy's copy". In the same interview, Morrie added that the problem with new visual kei bands is that "they're established as a genre... well, there's probably a part of it that's business-wise, but it wouldn't be fun if it got stiff. I would like to see people who are trying to break through that area. It doesn't matter how good you are, whether you're doing it on the visual kei route or not, it's something fundamental."

Time Out Tokyo's Bunny Bissoux concluded in 2015 that the movement "today is basically a parallel of the J-pop idol system" and "that originally prided itself on being different, it now attracts those who want to 'look' visual kei. Genuine originality (in the music, at least) seems to be dying out." In 2018, Seiichi Hoshiko said that he was worried about this trend's effect on the movement's future.

== Popularity ==
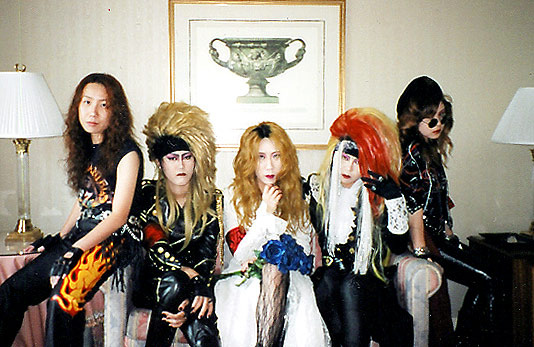
Japanese fans doing X Japan cosplay

Magazines published regularly in Japan with visual kei coverage are Arena 37 °C, Cure, Fool's Mate Express, Shoxx, Shock Wave, and Rock and Read among others. The popularity and awareness of visual kei groups outside Japan has seen an increase in recent years, mostly through internet and Japanese anime, shown for example by German magazines Peach (discontinued in 2011) and Koneko, as well European record label Gan-Shin. The biggest fan communities are found in the United States, Germany, Poland, Russia, France, Brazil, and to some extent Finland, Chile and Sweden.

From this influence on international youth subcultures, bands like Cinema Bizarre emerged, but they hesitate to consider themselves visual kei because they are not ethnically Japanese. Examples of non-Japanese acts that either claimed to be visual kei-inspired or billed themselves as visual kei are American music project Canary Complex, Korean band Madmans Esprit, and Swedish singer Yohio. Despite the existence of visually similar music acts in the West such as Marilyn Manson, Tokio Hotel and Lady Gaga, Pfeifle writes that the androgynous look of visual kei bands often has a repulsive effect on Westerners.

Some musicologists cite fascination with the singer's voice holds strong attraction for international (predominantly female) fans, who engage in stylized furi (movements) like tesensu (arm fan), gyakudai (reversed dive), hedoban (headbang), and saku (spread hands in the air).

== Gallery ==
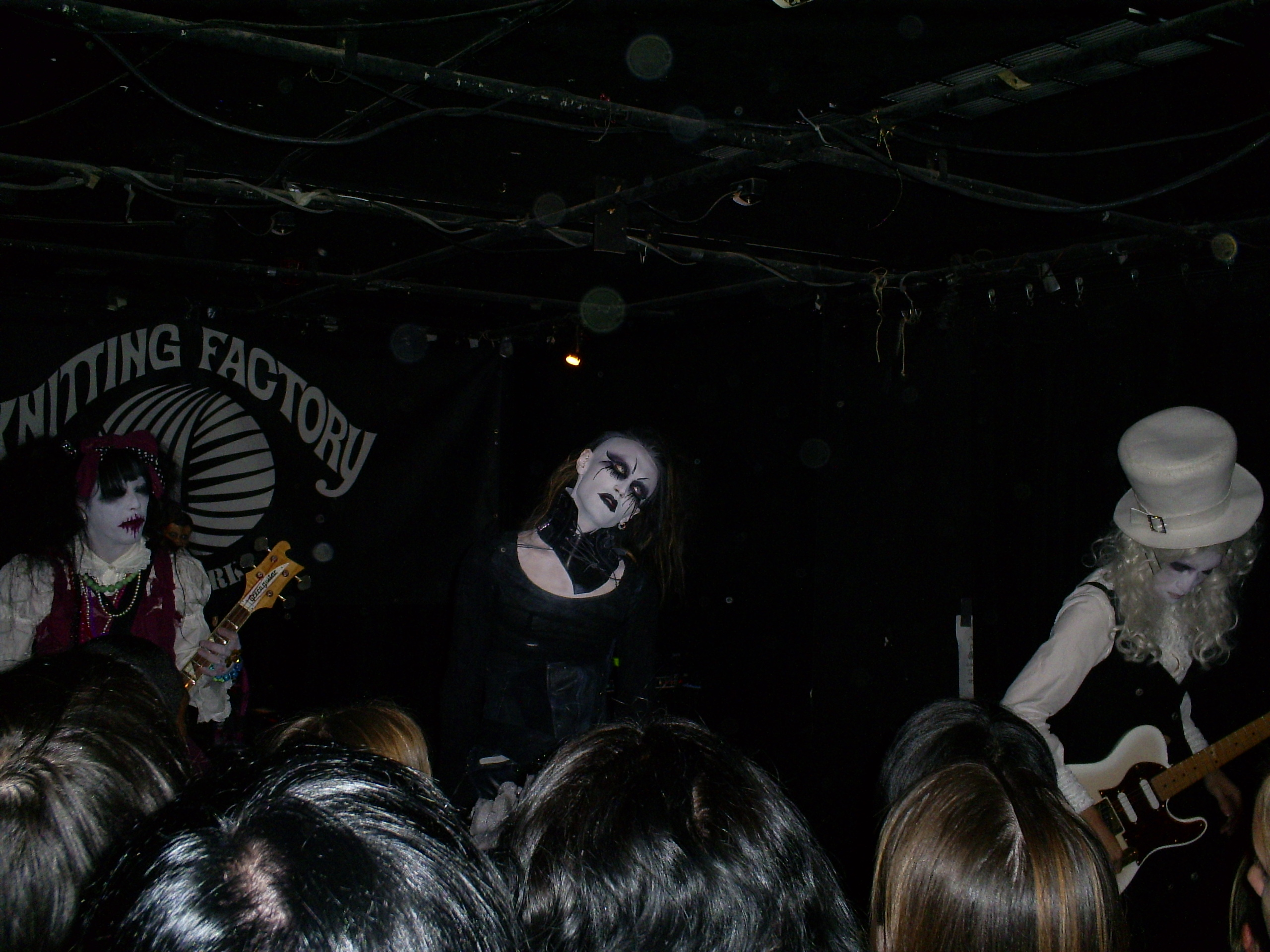
The Candy Spooky Theater with white face paint in New York City 2007

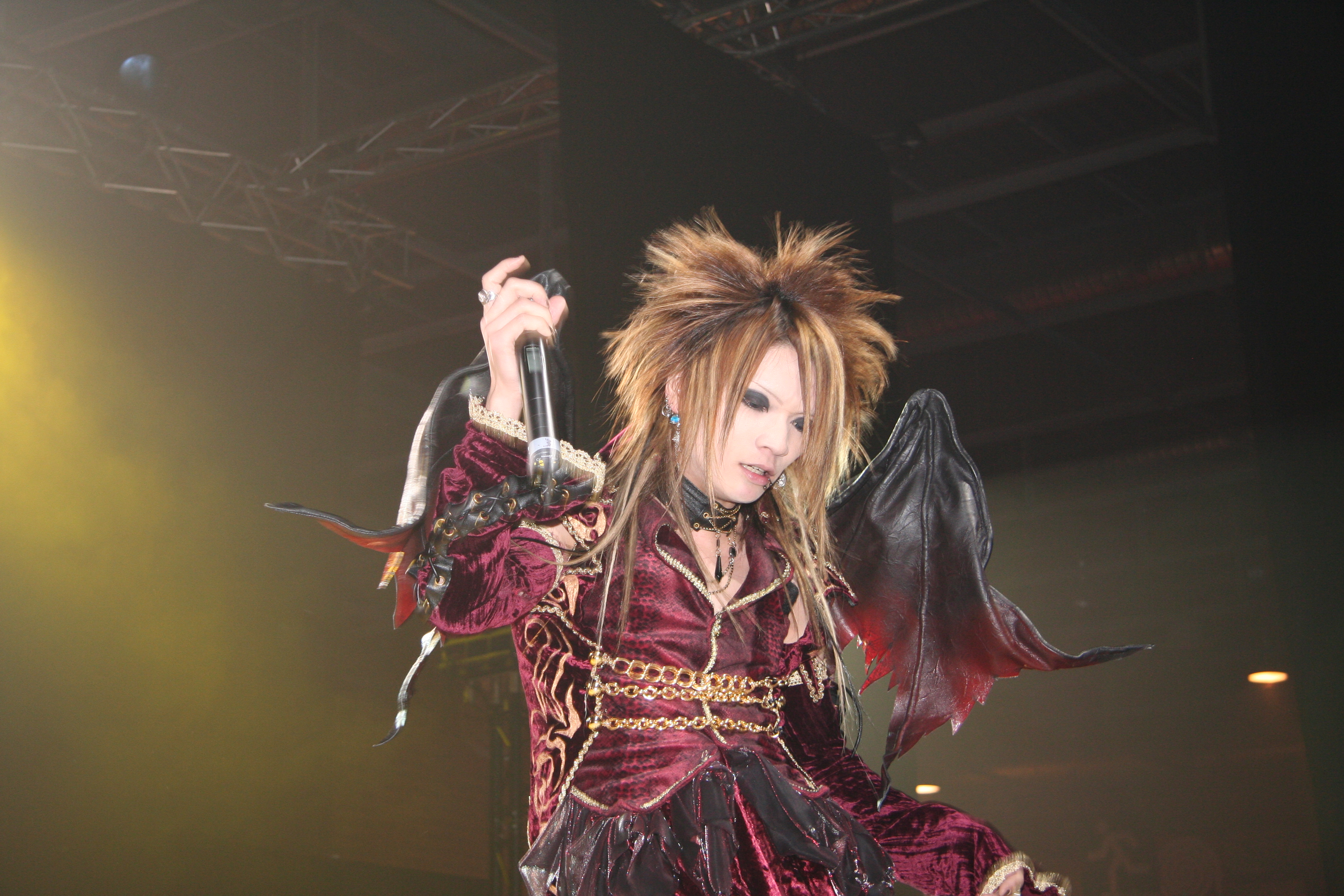
Dio – Distraught Overlord vocalist Mikaru wearing a costume in Paris 2007

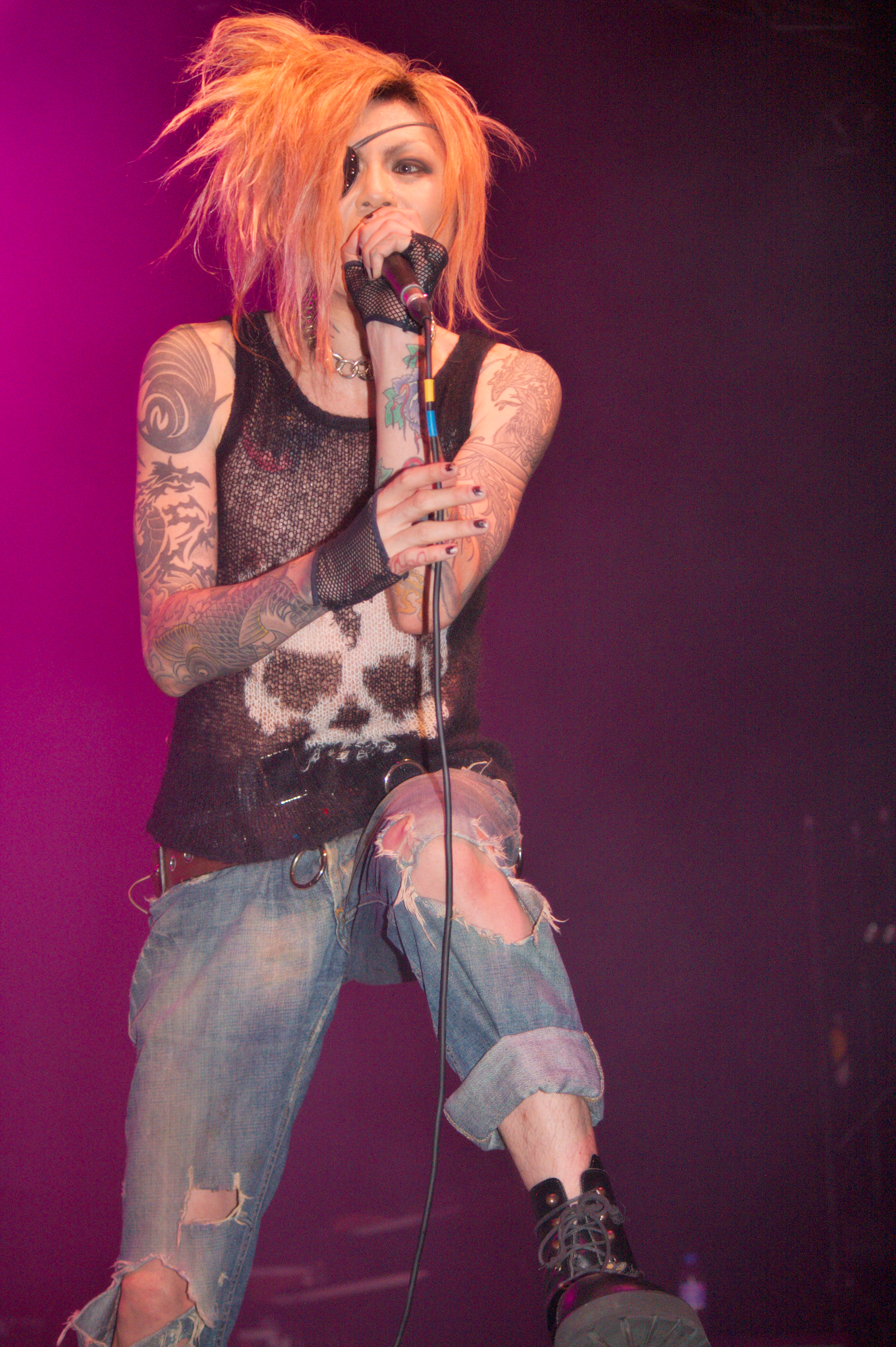
Penicillin vocalist Hakuei in Paris 2008

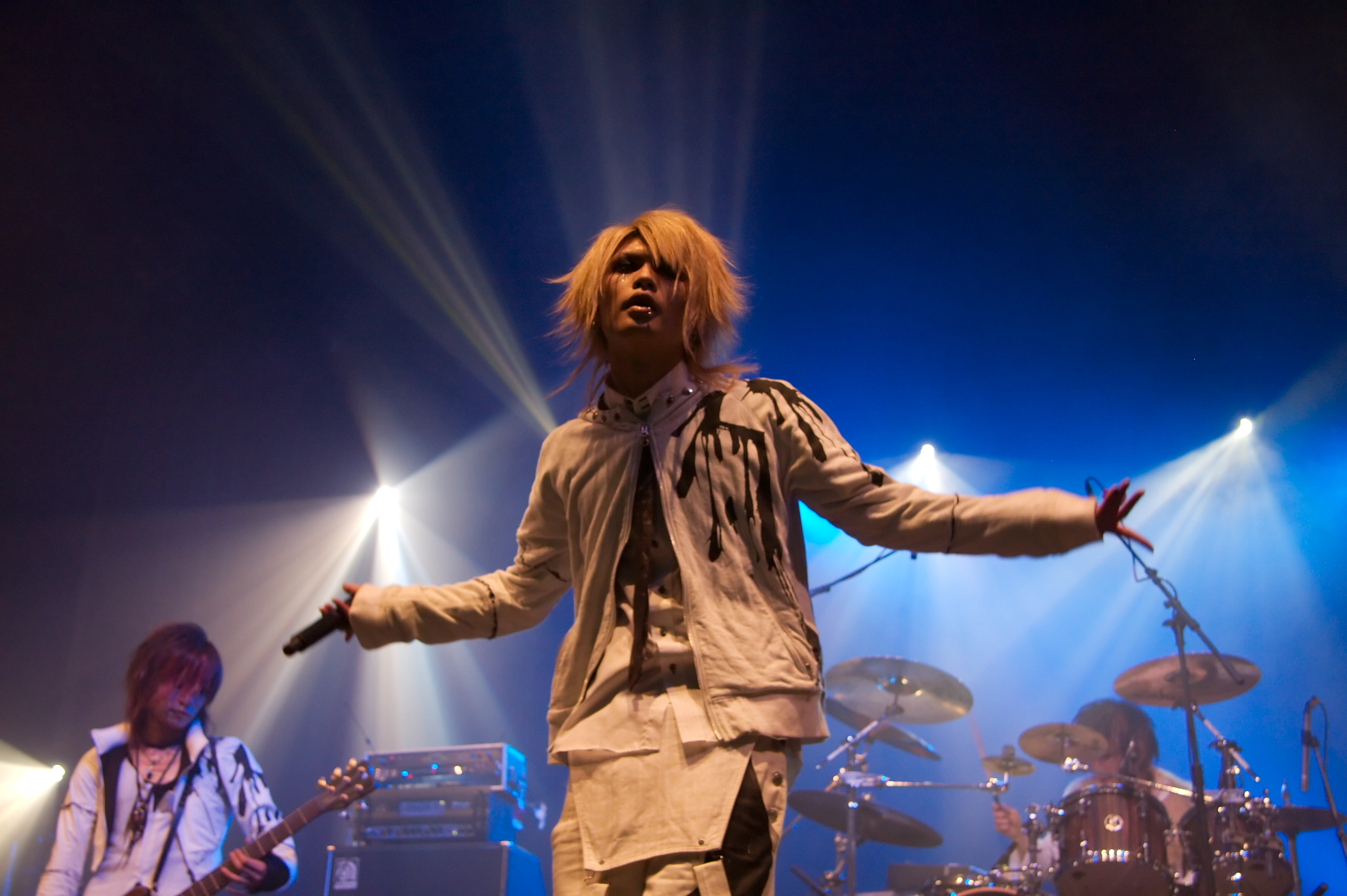
Vistlip wearing matching outfits in Paris 2009

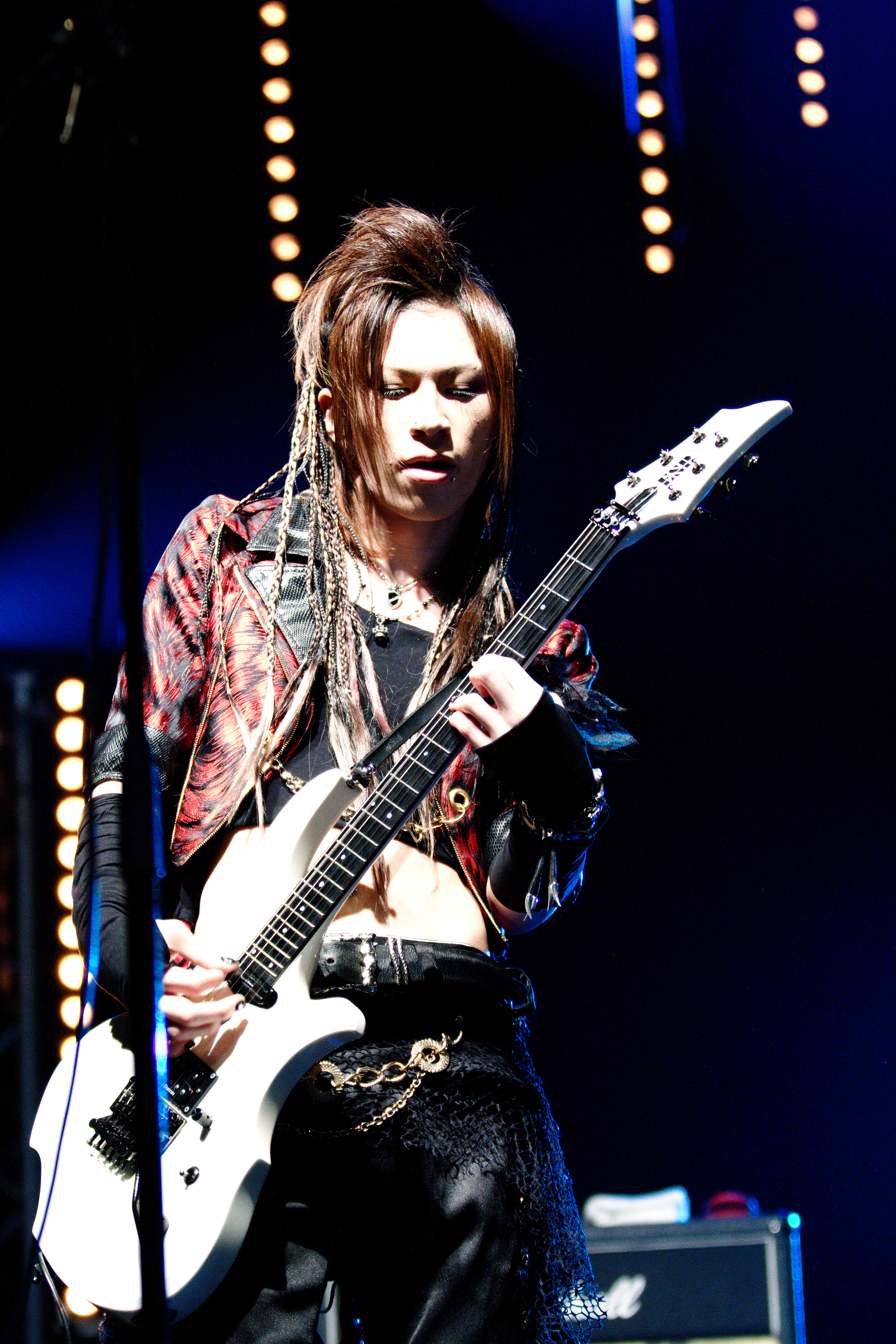
Vivid guitarist Ryōga in Paris 2010

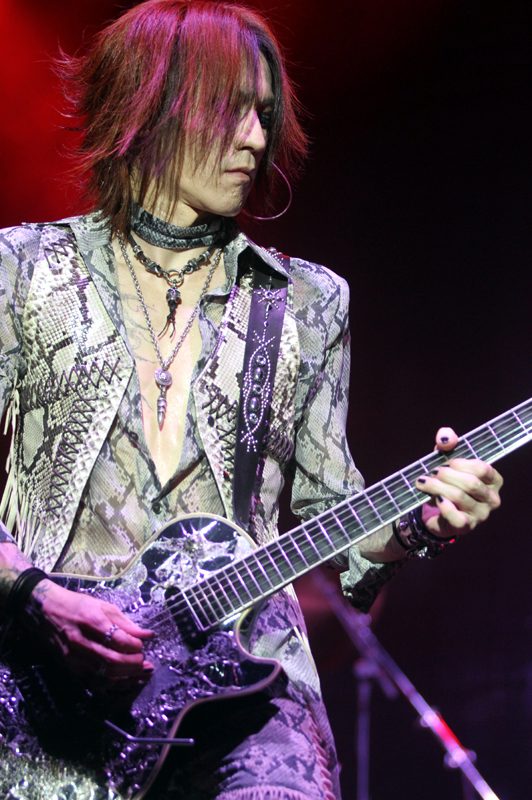
Sugizo performing with X Japan in Brazil 2011

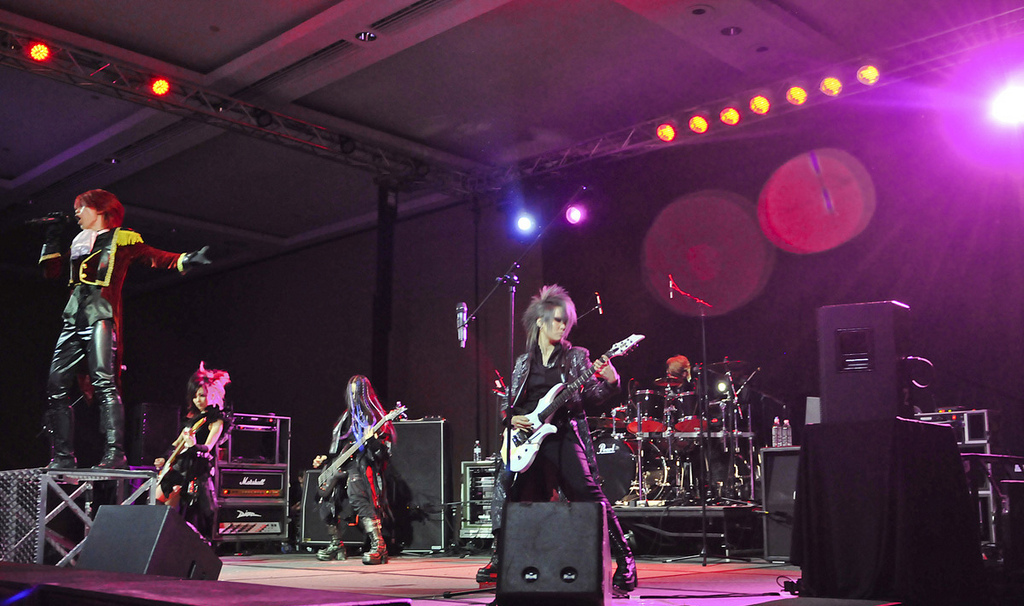
All-female band Exist Trace in Pittsburgh 2012

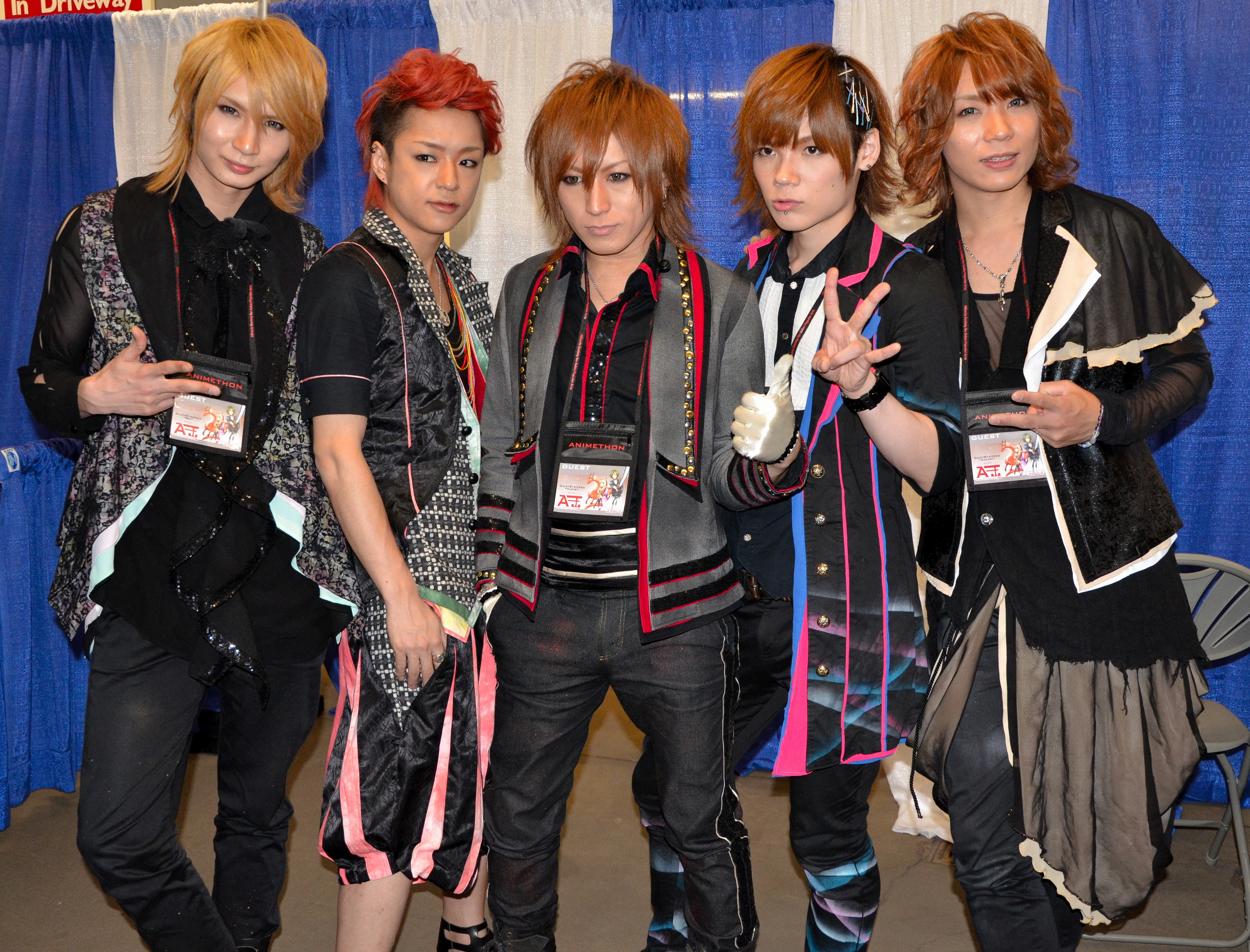
Daizystripper in Alberta 2012

== See also ==
- List of visual kei musical groups
- Japanese rock
- Japanese metal
- Scene (subculture)
