= R-Shitei (band) =

Japanese visual kei rock band

- Origin: Hakata, Fukuoka, Japan
- Genres: Rock; alternative metal; hard rock
- Years active: 2007–2019, 2025–present
- Label: Speed Disk
- Members: Mamo; Z; Kaede; Nanahoshi; Hirotaka
- Past members: Kaoru
- Website: r-shitei.sakura.ne.jp

R-Shitei (R指定) is a Japanese visual kei rock band formed in Fukuoka in 2007. Composed of members Mamo, Z, Kaede, Nanahoshi, and Hirotaka, they went on hiatus in 2019 after releasing five studio albums, and returned in 2025. Since 2009, they have been signed to independent label Speed Disk.

R-Shitei is considered one of the pioneering artists of the menhera kei subgenre, addressing themes such as suicide and self-harm under the concept of "I Am Menhera". The band also uses themes such as Japanese nationalism and religion.

== History ==
Vocalist Mamo divided the band into three phases: the first being the phase Japan (日本, Nihon), the second as Menhera (メンヘラ) and the third as Religion (宗教, Shūkyō).

=== 2007: Formation as R-18 then R-15 ===
The group was originally formed under the name R-18 in 2007 in Hakata, Fukuoka. Following their first show on March 30, they released the EP Nihil Party. They changed their name to R-15 shortly thereafter, releasing four singles and an EP under that name. They continued to perform in Fukuoka, including shows alongside bands such as Screw, ValettA, and Maykur.

Composed by former members of the band Catheline, they explained that the members came together to form a new band following the breakup of their previous one. The new group was conceived by Mamo and Nanahoshi, who then invited the other members: Z, Kaede, and Kaoru.

=== 2008–2012: "Japan" phase ===
In April 2008, drummer Kaoru was replaced by Hirotaka, and the band’s name was officially changed to R-Shitei. On July 23, they released the EP Occult Jigoku, accompanied by a ten-date tour. After the tour, they held a special concert where attendees received a free documentary DVD about the band. In December, they performed at various events throughout Fukuoka, including a solo concert on the 27th and a New Year’s event.

In January 2009, they released the EP "Oyafukōtōri wa Kyō mo Ame". They continued to perform regularly, including a joint concert with the band xTRiPx. They released the single "Gyokusai Melancholy" in April, followed by the Dai Nihon Occult Angya tour. They released two greatest hits albums in July and September, respectively. It was also in September that they signed with the independent label Speed Disk, debuting with the single "Kokuritsu Shounen". It was in 2009 that, after selling out a concert in their hometown, they moved to Tokyo. In January of the following year, the single "Haikei, Barairo na Hibi yo" was released, reaching number four on the Oricon independent singles chart despite being limited to 1,000 copies. It was included on their debut album Ningen Shikkaku, also a limited edition, which was released in March with a print run of 2,000 copies. In June, R-Shitei released the single "Alice Shinjuu" and in August the single "Giratsuku Taiyō", which was followed by a tour from October to November, with the final show sponsored by Like an Edison. Before releasing the single "Haranbanjō, tsubaki-uta" in December, they participated in the D=OUT’s tour across Japan’s 47 prefectures. They ended the year with a special concert on December 29, inviting fans to attend in cosplay.

To start off 2011, they performed a special concert on January 7 and took part in Speed Disk events on the 9th and 10th. In April, they released the single "Someiyoshino", which was featured on the television show V no Ryugi (Ｖの流儀). It was followed by the single "Dokumoru" in July, which was promoted with a short tour. In August, R-shitei performed at Toshima Public Hall and then embarked on a Speed Disk tour. In September, they played at the Cure magazine's debut event. At the end of the year, they released a compilation of music videos and announced more special cosplay concerts. This time, the concerts took place over five consecutive weeks under the title "Band Members You Can Meet" and all the shows sold out. The album Crush! -90's V-Rock Best Hit Cover Songs- (2011), in which visual kei artists pay tribute to those who were influential in the movement during the 1990s, featured a cover of "Yurameki" played by R-Shitei. In early 2012, they released their second album, Nihon Chinbotsu, which reached number one on Oricon indie charts. The album was accompanied by the Scream of Japanese Crusher tour, with some dates selling out.

=== 2012–2016: "Menhera" phase ===
Following a Speed Disk tour in March 2012, R-Shitei announced the Menhera no Tsudoi tour. The tour promoted the single "I Am Menhera", released in June. In August, they promoted another tour under the theme "Band Members You Can Meet". Before releasing their next single, "Aikoku Revolution", in November, they performed on a small twoman tour with Kiryu. In late November, they kicked off the Dogra Magra Dogma tour, which would conclude on January 14, and the singles "Closet Girl" and "Slow Days" were released during the tour. In March and August 2013, R-Shitei headlined the Yawata no Yabu Shirazu tour alongside four other bands, including Born and Cat Fist. In the meantime, the singles "Seishun wa Wrist Cut" and "Sekai no Owari" were released; the latter served as theme song for television program Rank Oukoku. Their last six singles were included on the album Visual is Dead, released in September. It was immediately promoted by a tour that concluded on December 6 at Shibuya Public Hall. Before the year ended, R-Shitei took part in the "Mousou Nikki" cover project and performed at the Over The Edge '12–'13 New Year's event alongside several other bands. The album hide Tribute III -Visual Spirits- was also released in 2013, on which R-Shitei performed a cover of "Rocket Dive".

In early 2014, R-Shitei held another cosplay event and two battle concerts in February, one featuring Diaura and the other featuring Kiryu. This year, they organized several Yawata no Yabu Shirazu tours, featuring bands such as Zoro, Dog in The PWO and Mejibray. In May, the single "Yanderu Kanojo" was released, ranking as the 15th best-selling independent single in Japan in 2014 and voted as the most popular song by R-Shitei in a poll conducted by V-ism website. In August, they performed at the Shock Wave festival, organized by Shoxx magazine, and at the Stylish Wave festival, organized by the Takadanobaba Area venue. In October, they released their single "Hōtai Otoko/Yawata No Yabu Shirazu" and went on a tour on Zepp venues.

Back in February 2015, they performed at NHK Hall on the 1st and released the single "Sadomazo" ten days later, which received the same annual ranking as "Yanderu Kanojo". They start off April with a Speed Disk tour that immediately followed it up with the Shinita Gari no Min tour, then released the single "Suicide Memories" on June 10. In August, R-Shitei, Kiryu, BugLug and Vistlip went on a quartet tour called 4Biyoushi. It was in October that they released the first edition of their fourth studio album, Shōjo Sōshitsu, which was described as a diverse album by the JRock News website. In addition to the four singles of the album, the song "Koroshitai Kurai Aishiteru" was included in issue 260 of Shoxx magazine. The album was promoted through the Seishun no Yami tour, which ran through January.

=== 2016–2019: "Religion" phase ===
After releasing the single "Hachijuuhachi Kasho Junrei" in March 2016, R-Shitei embarked on an extensive tour consisting of 88 shows. The plan was to hold the final concert at the Nippon Budokan, but the band was banned from performing there due to the radical and explicit themes of their songs. In August, they released their first single with an English title, "forest". In October, three concerts were held in Tokyo under the title "Goodbye R-Shitei, Date of Death: 8," featuring themes of death and funerals. That same month, they also performed at the Visual Japan Summit festival. In December, they released the single "-Shambara-" and kicked off a solo tour of the same name.

In April 2017, they released the EP Nihon Abnormal Kyōkai, accompanied by a music video for each song. In July, they released the single "Miwaku no Summer Killers", followed by "Dokumawaru" in December. This year, they also contributed to the Plastic Tree tribute album, Plastic Tree Tribute ~Transparent Branches~, with a cover of"Sink". In March 2018, the 4Biyoushi tour took place once again, and on the 14th, the band released the single "Kiseichuu/Zange". It was the final single from the album Shikai Bunsho, which was released on July 25, 2018. in June, lead singer Mamo launched his own clothing brand, called Himeyuri Secret. In August, he appeared on the cover of the magazine Rock and Read. On September 8, the band Urbangarde held the 5th edition of the Urban Fest 2018 festival, featuring R-Shitei and Maison book girl. The festival aims to bring together artists who explore depressive themes. The following month, R-Shitei embarked on a tour featuring songs from their debut album. In December, they invited veteran artists Alice Nine, Mucc, LM.C, Lynch and Plastic Tree to perform battle concerts and released the single "Erogro".

On August 11, 2019, they held an outdoor performance in Osaka on a particularly hot day, when the temperature reached 37 celsius degrees. This year, they released the singles "Flashback" and "Climax". Suddenly, on December 22, the band announced that just seven days later they would be going on hiatus, after wrapping up a tour playing on every prefecture in Japan. They released a farewell single titled "Isho". As the reason for the hiatus, Mamo said, "I've been working on this nonstop for 10 years, and now I'm at the top of my game. To do something better than this... I couldn't think of anything else."

After R-Shitei went on hiatus, the members joined other musical projects. Kaede formed KiD and Mamo created the projects Ainiku no Ame and Yuugure Girl Suicide. In 2024, Hirotaka and Kaede formed the supergroup Ga to Chou.

=== 2025: Return ===
In late 2024, R-Shitei announced that they would be gradually releasing their music on streaming services starting January 1 and that they would return with a special concert on April 18, 2025, in Tokyo. After the show, they scheduled three more performances: on September 27, October 17, and December 26.

The band continues to perform occasional concerts in 2026. On April 19, they held a meet-and-greet event in Fukuoka.

== Themes and popularity ==
R-Shitei explicitly addressed mental health issues such as self-harm, suicide, codependency, death, and yandere in their songs. The band defined their concept as "I am Menhera" a Japanese slang term referring to someone with a mental health disorder. As a result, they became recognized as pioneers of the subgenre menhera kei. In addition, the band frequently addresses Japanese nationalist and religious themes.

The band's musical style is considered rock, alternative metal and hard rock. The band claimed to have turned down offers to sign with a major label.

R-Shitei, Kiryu, BugLug, and Vistlip have been described as the "four heavenly kings" of the new generation of visual kei during the 4Biyoushi tours. This title was coined to refer to Malice Mizer, Shazna, Fanatic Crisis e La'cryma Christi in the previous generation. Their fans consists mainly of female students.

== Members ==
- Mamo (マモ) – vocal
- Z – guitar
- Kaede (楓) – guitar
- Nanahoshi (七星) – bass
- Hirotaka (宏崇) – drums

Former

- Kaoru – drums (2007–2008)

== Discography ==
Studio albums

Title	Release	Oricon peak position	
Title	Release	Main	Indies
Ningen Shikkaku (人間失格)	March 24, 2010	157	
Nihon Chinbotsu (日本沈没)	February 1, 2012	22	1
Visual is Dead	September 25, 2013	23	1
Shōjo Sōshitsu (少女喪失-syojosoushitsu-)	October 28, 2015	27	3
Shikai Bunsho (死海文書)	July 25, 2018	18	

EPs

Title	Release	Oricon peak position	
Title	Release	Main	Indies
Occult Jigoku (オカルト地獄)	July 23, 2008	—N/a	
Uraon Genban. (裏音源盤。)	July 25, 2009	—N/a	1
Nihon Abnormal Kyōkai (日本アブノーマル協会)	March 21, 2017	20	

Singles

Title	Release	Oricon peak position	
Title	Release	Main	Indies
"Kokuritsu Shounen" (國立少年)	September 23, 2009	—N/a	
"Haikei, Barairo na Hibi yo" (拝啓、薔薇色な日々よ)	January 20, 2010	135	4
"Alice Shinjuu" (アリス心中)	June 23, 2010	97	
"Giratsuku Taiyō" (ギラつく太陽)	August 25, 2010	98	
"Haranbanjō, tsubaki-uta" (波瀾万丈、椿唄)	December 8, 2010	62	
"Someiyoshino" (ソメイヨシノ)	April 6, 2011	43	
"Dokumoru" (毒盛る)	July 20, 2011	38	
"I Am Menhera" (アイアムメンヘラ)	June 6, 2012	19	1
"Aikoku Revolution" (愛國革命)	November 21, 2012	32	3
"Closet Girl" (クローゼットガール)	December 26, 2012	21	1
"Slow Days" (スロウデイズ)	January 9, 2013	29	1
"Seishun wa Wrist Cut" (青春はリストカット)	April 24, 2013	29	1
"Sekai no Owari" (セカイノオワリ)	July 17, 2013	29	10
"Mousou Nikki" (妄想日記)	December 11, 2013	29	4
"Yanderu Kanojo" (病ンデル彼女)	May 14, 2014	13	4
"Hōtai Otoko/Yahata no Yabushirazu" (包帯男/八幡の薮知らず)	October 8, 2014	6	7
"Sadomazo" (サドマゾ)	February 11, 2015	8	1
"Suicide Memories" (スーサイドメモリーズ)	June 10, 2015	13	2
"Hachijuuhachi Kasho Junrei" (八十八箇所巡礼)	March 9, 2016	13	1
"Forest"	August 3, 2016	34	4
"-Shambara-"	December 21, 2016	21	
"Miwaku no Summer Killers" (魅惑のサマーキラーズ)	July 12, 2018	22	
"Dokumawaru" (毒廻る)	December 13, 2017	24	3
"Kiseichuu/-Zange-" (規制虫/-ZANGE-)	March 14, 2018	27	2
"Erogro"	December 26, 2018	26	
"Flashback" (フラッシュバック)	May 1, 2019	27	6
"Climax"	September 18, 2019	—N/a	
"Isho" (遺書)	December 25, 2019	47	7

DVDs

- Eizo Ban. (映像盤。– October 19, 2011), Oricon: 31
- Eizo Ban. Vol 2 (映像盤。参 – March 26, 2014), Oricon: 56
- Eizo Ban. Vol 3 (映像盤。弐 – March 26, 2014), Oricon: 90
- Eizo Ban. Vol 4 (映像盤。伍 – June 26, 2019)
- Eizo Ban. Vol 5 (映像盤。肆 – June 26, 2019)

=== As R-15 ===
EP

- Beautyful Sad Song (December 12, 2007)

Singles

- "Kirisaki JACK no Yūutsu" (切り裂きジャックの憂鬱; July 25, 2007)
- "The dead world" (August 29, 2007)
- "Moumoku Shoujo" (盲目少女; December 12, 2007)
- "Kuroneko" (黒猫; December 31, 2007)

=== As R-18 ===
- Nihil Party (April 25, 2007)
