= Cure (magazine) =

Japanese rock music and fashion magazine

Cure Magazine
- Categories: Music
- Frequency: Monthly
- Publisher: ASIA HOUSE CO. LTD
- First issue: 2003
- Final issue: 2022 (print)
- Company: ASIA HOUSE CO. LTD
- Country: Japan
- Based in: Tokyo, Japan
- Language: Japanese
- Website: Official website

Cure was a Japanese rock music and fashion magazine that is published monthly. It features the latest visual kei bands and fashion and styling tips. It also has the latest news and trends on the visual kei music scene. Different artists are featured on the front and back cover every month. Regularly featured bands included Diaura, Mejibray, Royz, Blu-Billion, Arlequin, Baroque, R-Shitei, BugLug, Sadie, Daizystripper and DuelJewel. The magazine initially focused on lesser-known visual kei bands than those covered by magazines like Shoxx.

The magazine also features fashion snapshot cruisings of fans from around the world attending visual kei and Jrock shows. Originally a print publication, it switched to an online, digital format in 2022.

== Columns ==
Popular columns within the magazine:

Exclusive Photos - Live Report and After Interview of popular Visual kei bands

Band Close-ups - one on one interview

Band Pick up - Interviews and reports on the newest hot bands

Live Reports - Jrock and Visual Kei band concert reports

Style Counseling - Hot Fashion brands and styling from Cure and the bands

Special Columns - Newest live house and music release information, SnapShot Cruising, close pick up of band's personal activities

== Overseas Shows and Events ==
Cure Magazine has been known for bringing Visual kei and Jrock bands overseas for shows and panel sessions for the past years, including Riku (Chariots), Kuro (VelBet), GaGaalinG at Anime Expo 2008, Kaya at PMX 2008, Dio & Sugar at OniCon 2008 Texas, Auncia & Satsuki at Anime Expo 2009, ALSDEAD & Satsuki at Anime Vegas 2009, Born & Satsuki at Onicon 2009 Texas, MYM (Gagaaling) at Anime Boston 2010, SADIE Live at AM2 Los Angeles 2011, CELL at ANIME EXPO 2013, and Los Angeles VK and Idol Fest 2014.

The Official Cure Magazine Shop in Los Angeles, XENON, has allowed U.S. fans to interact with bands through Livestream Q&A session events since August 2014. Well-known bands, including CELL, Diaura, Royz, Daizystripper, Grieva, Lin -End of World Corruption, Arlequin, The Rhedoric, and Pentagon, have been welcomed to the event.

The magazine organized a visual kei festival in April 2016, with foreign visual bands attending, as well as Japanese bands like Diaura, Mejibray and Clowd.
