= Genki Takebuchi =

Japanese singer and songwriter

- Also known as: Tsuzuku
- Born: December 15, 1986 (age 39)
- Origin: Yokohama, Japan
- Genres: Rock
- Occupations: Singer-songwriter, vocal coach
- Years active: 2004–present

Genki Takebuchi (竹渕玄規, Takebuchi Genki), also known as Tsuzuku (綴), is a Japanese singer and songwriter. He became known as the lead singer of the visual kei bands VanessA and, most notably, Mejibray. After Mejibray disbanded, he formed the duos 8P-SB, 30sec certain victory, and solo projects. He is currently active with his solo project tzkwym, while also being part of the supergroup Drugs. He is also a vocal coach, writes poetry, and produces other musical artists.

== Early life and career ==
Before discovering visual kei bands, Takebuchi listened to artists such as Exile, Kinki Kids, and Chemistry. Childhood friends introduced him to visual kei/rock bands such as Baroque and Sex Machineguns, although he mentioned that his favorites are Dir en grey and The Gazette. He says he was impressed by Dir en grey's album Vulgar.

Born in Yokohama, he moved to Tokyo after graduating from high school to form his first band, which lasted three months.

Genki said in an interview with Rock and Read that the vast majority of his lyrics are inspired by his personal experiences.

== Career ==
Genki began his career as a vocalist in 2004, at age 18. In October 2005, he formed the band Ruru (るる), which was active for only one year. He went on to form DIS in June 2006, which also lasted about a year; they disbanded in March 2007.

In 2007, he formed VanessA, which gained more prominence than his previous bands. They played their first solo show in 2009, but had already performed with artists such as R-Shitei. In 2010, after six singles and one EP, the guitarist decided to leave the band, leading to their breakup. Today, bassist Nao is part of Xanvala.

With his bandmates Koichi and Ippu (Haruki when at VanessA), he changed his stage name to Tsuzuku and formed Mejibray, initially as a solo project. Mejibray became his best-known band and left its mark on the visual kei scene of the 2010s, with sold-out shows and high rankings on Oricon's indie charts. At the end of 2017, Koichi and Tsuzuku suddenly terminated their contracts with Mejibray's record label, resulting in the band's activities being put on hold.

In 2018, the two formed the pop duo 8P-SB, contrasting their previous musicality. In 2020, Takebuchi released two solo songs under his real name: “Bookshelf” and “Tenbin” in February and June, respectively, teasing a possible end to 8P-SB. The duo officially ended in July, with both members focusing on their solo careers. On December 8, Genki formed a new solo project, SpelL, releasing his first self-titled single on the 15th. In 2021, he formed the duo 30sec certain victory with musician Ryutaro. They debuted on June 19 with the single "Screaming right now".

In April 2022, VanessA was revived with the live show RE:birth of the CHAOS. Then, on the 21st, the group released two new singles. In 2024, the singer started another solo project, tzkwym. He debuted with the EP "A Connectiv Sistem" in February, with references to Mejibray. On December 15, he released the single "Bisou". In 2025, the singer formed the supergroup Drugs with Yoshiatsu (Dadaroma, Fukuro), Wataru Shindo, and Taizo. Tzkwym released the EP And Yet I Remain on June 29, and the day before, he held the live event Abracadabra, featuring artists such as Neth Priere Cain and The Devil Inside. On November 2, he released the single "Rakuen", accompanied by a national tour starting on the 8th. On the 25th, he performed as a guest at visual kei band Liza's concert in Shinjuku.

For his first time performing internationally, Tsuzuku embarked in a seven dates Europe tour in May with The Devil Inside, and in a four dates Latin America tour in June with Kouki and Seth. In July, Drugs announced their disbandment.

== Discography ==
Genki Takebuchi

- "Bookshelf" (February 28, 2020)
- "Libra" (天秤, Tenbin; June 19, 2020)
- "Zankyo" (響; September 1, 2020)

SpelL

- "SpelL" (December 15, 2020)

Tzkwym

- "A CONNECTIV SISTEM" (February 29, 2024)
- "Koe" (聲; June 27, 2024)
- "-6-" (October 31, 2024)
- "Bisou" (美葬; December 15, 2024)
- "And Yet I Remain" (June 26, 2025)
- "Rakuen" (November 2, 2025)
