= Kiryū (band) =

Japanese band

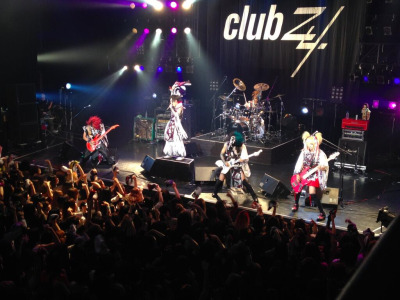
- Kiryu in a show in Japan presented by Club Zy magazine.

Background information
- Origin: Tokyo, Japan
- Genres: Folk metal; alternative metal; hard rock; heavy metal; power metal
- Years active: 2007–2023
- Label: B.P Records
- Members: Mahiro Kurosaki; Takemasa Kujō; Mitsuki Sakai; Hiyori Isshiki; Junji Tokai
- Website: www.kiryu-web.net

Kiryū (己龍) is a Japanese visual kei metal band founded in 2007 with the concept of "Japanese terror" and "painful nostalgia". Formed by vocalist Mahiro Kurosaki, guitarists Takemasa Kujō and Mitsuki Sakai, bassist Hiyori Isshiki and drummer Junji Tokai, each member is represented by a color. They have been part of the independent label B.P Records since 2009.

Many of their releases have reached high positions on the Oricon Indies chart, and they have also performed at venues such as Nippon Budokan and Tokyo Dome City Hall. They were ranked thirteenth in JRock News top 15 visual kei bands and artists of 2020 and received an honorable mention in the Most Influential Jrockers of 2017.

Takemasa Kujō stopped featuring in the band's public appearances at the end of 2021 and one year later Mahiro Kurosaki also paused his activities. Consequently, the band entered an indefinite hiatus in the end of 2023.

== Career ==
=== 2007–2008: Establishment and early years ===
Takemasa and Mitsuki played in a visual kei band together in Hamamatsu, Shizuoka, called mi'ze:lia. After the group split, they invited their backup drummer Junji Tokai to form a new band in Tokyo. Through mutual friends, Mahiro was invited to be the lead singer. Sakai and Takemasa aimed to establish a band with its own personality and different from the popular bands at the time. Initially, Takemasa envisioned the "disgusting visual kei" concept for the band, which later cemented itself in "Japanese horror" and "painful nostalgia".

Kiryū was founded on September 17, 2007 and their first live performance took place on December 16 at Holiday Shinjuku. Therefore, the band considers December 16th their official formation date. On March 25, 2008, tickets for their first event, Garyou Tensei in Shinjuku Ruido, were sold out. At this event, they distributed the CD "Sakuragarami" for free. In May, the debut single "Another Side" (アナザｰサイド) was released and another version was released the following month. In October, another single was on sale: "Murasakishoku/Saigo no Koi" and on November 26, the debut mini album Shūgetsu Heika.

=== 2009–2013: Rise of fame and big national tours ===
In 2009, Kiryū joined B.P Records. They performed at Meguro Rockmaykan on January 17, distributing a limited single, "Watashi.", and on May 15, 2009, the group performed in Takadanobaba Area, distributing the also limited CD "Chimimōryō no Chōryōbatsuko". At the end of the year, they released the single "Tsuki no Hime". Takemasa stated that with this single, the band's concept ("Japanese horror") was finally established. In early 2010, they released their first full-length album, Meikyō Shisui. Copies of the first edition of the single "Ruru" sold out on the same day of release, October 27. On March 2, 2011, the second album "Mugen Hōyō" was released. On September 14, Mahiro contributed to the charity single "Hitotsudake ~We Are The One~", created to help victims of the 2011 Tōhoku earthquake and tsunami.

From "Tsuki no Hime" to "Kyōsei" (2011), five Kiryū singles have reached #1 on the Oricon independent singles chart consecutively. Kyōsei was the 12th best-selling independent single of 2011 according to Oricon.

After Kiryū's popularity grew, they embarked on their first tour of Japan's 47 prefectures in 2012. Despite difficulties, such as when Mahiro had an accident on stage and injured his leg, over 15,000 people attended the tour in total and tickets for most shows were sold out. Shukaensen was released in April and the single "Tomoshibi" in November. In October, Kiryū and R-Shitei toured together. Another tour across all Japan started in July 2013. This year, the band released the singles "Etsu to Utsu", "Aienkien" and "Akaimi Hajiketa", and played a cover of "Pink Spider" by hide for Tribute III -Visual Spirits-.

=== 2014–2016: First international shows ===
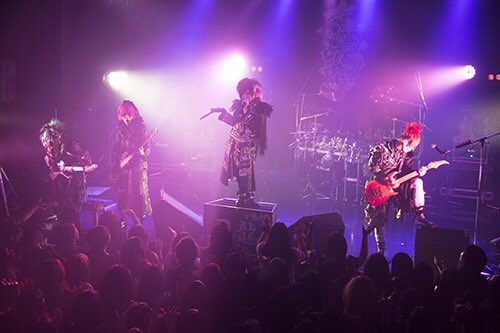
Kiryu in a live in Japan.

With the release of Kyoka Suigetsu in April 2014, Kiryū started a promotional tour, as usual, and held their first international concerts. The Kyoka Suigetsu Tour featured concerts all over Japan as well as performances across Asia, with concerts in Taiwan, South Korea, China and Hong Kong. The only single released in 2014 is "Amaterasu", on November 19.

The 13th single "Kyūbi" was released in April 2015 in ten editions and is the band's most successful song to date, reaching number four on Oricon Singles Chart. On July 31, they performed at Nippon Budokan for the first time, after another tour of Japan's 47 prefectures. In September, Kiryū, BugLug, R-Shitei and Vistlip embarked on a four-band tour together, named 4Byoushi. Teaming with B.P Records bands Royz and Codomo Dragon, Kiryū released "Family Party" and the music video for Ryōran Resonance (繚乱レゾナンス) in November. The three bands went on a national tour together from November to December.

On April 30, 2016, Kiryu took place in Cure World Visual Festival along with other visual kei bands, even groups from outside Japan, a rare occurrence. Hyakki Yagyo, the fifth album, hit stores on June 29. The tour in support of this release ended at Nippon Budokan on August 29. On October 16, they performed at the visual kei festival Visual Japan Summit.

=== 2017–2020: 10th anniversary celebrations ===
In 2017, Kiryū celebrated their ten-year career with their first greatest hits album entitled 2007–2017, with re-recordings of old songs. They also released the double A-side single "Jou no Hana/Oborezukiyo" on October 25, with the song "Jou no Hana" being used as the opening theme for Cardfight!! Vanguard G: Z.

The four-band tour 4Byoushi took place once again in 2018, with concerts from March 11 to 30. Kiryu was also invited by Dezert for their This is the Fact tour, performing on June 9. At the end of the year, their sixth album Tenshō Rinne was released and on December 8 they starred on Nippon TV's Ariyoshi Hanseikai television show. In 2019, three singles were released: "Senkō", "Tamaki no Hashi Naki ga Gotoshi" and "Kachō Fugetsu" With a performance at Tokyo Dome City Hall, the band celebrated their twelfth anniversary. In late 2019 Kiryū opened their own YouTube channel, that even Gackt starred in.

The single "Watashi Mamire" was produced by Mitsuki and published on March 4, 2020. Fan club members could buy tickets for the single promotion tour in advance. On December 16, they celebrated their 13th anniversary with a concert in Shibuya.

=== 2020–present: Takemasa and Mahiro's break and hiatus ===
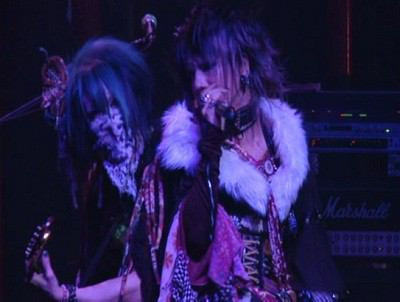
Takemasa (left) and Mahiro (right) paused their careers, leading Kiryu to enter a hiatus.

In February 2021, the single "Nue" was released. At the same time, Mitsuki was diagnosed with retinal detachment and had to suspend his activities until April. They performed for the third time at Nippon Budokan on April 10, and the concert was also streamed online via Zaiko website. Manjushage, the seventh album, was released on June 23. In August, leader and guitarist Takemasa announced that he would no longer participate in Kiryū's public performances from December 16, but would continue to produce and compose the band's works.

In 2022, they released the single "Zekū Zeshiki" on February 24 and "Kodoku" on July 13, announcing a 15th anniversary tour, running from October to December. A few days before the tour started, Mahiro revealed that he would be taking a break after the end of this tour, after being diagnosed with anxiety disorder and depression. The remaining three members stated that the band will continue as normal. On June 11, 2022 Kiryu appeared at the event Visual Kei Shugi alongside Penicillin, Versailles and Alice Nine.

Despite efforts to keep the band going after two members' break, in July 2023, the group announced that they will be going on indefinite hiatus after one last show on December 16, 2023, their 16-year career anniversary.

== My Dragon ==
My Dragon was a humorous alter-ego group of Kiryū, where the members danced and sang, not necessarily playing their instruments. Mahiro Kurosaki performed as Dandy Maro, Takemasa Kujō as Beauty Tama, Mitsuki Sakai as Charity Miki, Hiyori Isshiki as Panty Hiwai, and Junji Tokai as Pretty JuJu. With the exception of single CDs distributed exclusively at concerts since 2009, they debuted in February 2011 with "Nijigen Complex". In July 2014 they released the single "IDOL Sengen!?". On May 30, 2016, their third and final release took place: "Stardust Dream", where they performed with the concept of male anime idols.

Being a side band, they did few live performances and were sometimes an opening act for Kiryū. The profit from their concerts went to charities, such as helping victims of the 2011 Tōhoku earthquake and tsunami and Kumamoto earthquake in 2016. They used to perform every year on April 1. On April 1, 2018, they made their last performance and My Dragon ended.

== Members ==
- Mahiro Kurosaki (黒崎眞弥, Kurosaki Mahiro) – vocals (2007–2023)
- Mitsuki Sakai (酒井参輝, Sakai Mitsuki) – guitar (2007–2023)
- Hiyori Isshiki (一色日和, Isshiki Hiyori) – bass (2007–2023)
- Junji Tokai (遠海准司, Tokai Junji) – drums (2007–2023)
- Takemasa Kujō (九条武政, Kujō Takemasa) – guitar (2007–2021)

Takemasa has not featured in the band's public appearances since 2021, but it is reported that he still participates in production and songwriting.

== Discography ==
Albums and EPs

Type	Title	Oricon peak position	
Type	Title	Indies	Major
EP	Shūgetsu Heika (羞月閉花): Release: November 26, 2008	—	—
Studio album	Meikyō Shisui (明鏡止水): Release: January 27, 2010	3	113
Studio album	Mugen Hōyō (夢幻鳳影): Release: March 2, 2011	2	27
Studio album	Shuka Ensen (朱花艶閃): Release: April 25, 2012	—	12
Studio album	Kyoka Suigetsu (暁歌水月): Release: April 30, 2014	—	7
Studio album	Hyakkiyakō (百鬼夜行): Release: June 29, 2016	2	9
Greatest hits	2007-2017 (二〇〇七～二〇一七): Release: December 16, 2017	—	50
Studio album	Tenshō Rinne (転生輪廻): Release: November 14, 2018	3	12
Studio album	Manjushage (曼珠沙華): Release: June 23, 2021	1	17
"—": not ranked or position not found.

=== Singles ===
Title	Oricon peak position	
Title	Indies	Main
"Another Side – Kaijō-ban" (アナザーサイド～会場盤～): Release: May 16, 2008; Re-released on May 20 as "Another Side – Ryūtsū-ban" (アナザーサイド～流通盤～)	20	—
"Murasakishoku/Saigo no Koi" (紫蝕/最後ノ恋): Release: October 29, 2008	—	—
"Akaku Chiru Boku no Ao" (朱ク散ル僕ノ蒼): Release: May 6, 2009	—	160
"Tsuki no Hime" (月ノ姫): Release: October 21, 2009	1	63
"Mizunashi Sakura" (水無桜): Release: June 23, 2010	1	23
"Ruru" (屡流): Release: October 27, 2010	1	27
"Kisai" (鬼祭): Release: July 6, 2011	1	15
"Kyōsei" (叫声): Release: August 26, 2011	1	16
"Tomoshibi" (灯): Release: November 7, 2012	—	11
"Etsu to Utsu" (悦ト鬱): Release: February 20, 2013	—	9
"Aienkien" (愛怨忌焔): Release: May 29, 2013	—	9
"Akaimi Hajiketa" (アカイミハジケタ): Release: February 20, 2013	1	11
"Amaterasu" (天照): Release: November 19, 2014	—	8
"Kyūbi" (九尾): Release: April 1, 2015	3	4
"Family Party": Release: November 25, 2015; Collaboration with Royz and Codomo Dragon	—	7
"Irodori" (彩): Release: March 2, 2016	2	6
"Gekkabijin" (月下美人): Release: November 23, 2016	1	19
"Watashi wa Kairai, Sarugutsuwa no Ningyo" (私ハ傀儡、猿轡ノ人形): Release: April 5, 2017	—	12
"Jou no Hana/Oborezukiyo" (情ノ華/朧月夜): Release: October 25, 2017; Cardfight!! Vanguard G: Z opening theme	—	13
"Harushigure" (春時雨): Release: March 7, 2018	—	11
"Muku" (無垢): Release: July 11, 2018	—	9
"Senkō" (閃光): Release: March 20, 2019	—	13
"Tamaki no Hashi Naki ga Gotoshi" (手纏ノ端無キガ如シ): Release: July 10, 2019	3	17
"Kachō Fugetsu" (花鳥風月): Release: November 13, 2019	—	15
"Watashi Mamire" (私塗レ): Release: March 4, 2020	2	17
"Nue" (鵺): Release: February 17, 2021	2	16
"Yuki, Kokugo ni Tsuki" (雪、黒業ニツキ): Release: November 1, 2021	1	13
"Zekū Zeshiki" (是空是色): Release: February 24, 2022	3	16
"Kodoku" (蠱毒): Release: July 13, 2022	5	17
"—": not ranked or position not found.
