= Igari =

Igari (written: 猪狩 or 猪飼) is a Japanese surname. Notable people with the surname include:

- Tomoka Igari (猪狩 ともか; born 1991), Japanese idol

== Other uses ==
IGARI is the name of a key waypoint (6°56′12″N 103°35′6″E) in the disappearance of Malaysia Airlines Flight 370.
