= Erina Kamiya =

Erina Kamiya may refer to:

- Erina Kamiya (actress), born 1991
- Erina Kamiya (speed skater), born 1992
