= 上谷 =

上谷 could refer to:

- Kamiya, Japanese surname
- Sanggok Ma clan, Korean clan
- Shanggu Commandery, a commandery of ancient China, located in modern-day Hebei and Beijing
- Shanggu Township, a township in Chengde County, Hebei, China
