= Megamasso =

Japanese visual kei rock band

- Origin: Tokyo, Japan
- Genres: Pop punk; power pop; dance rock; hard rock (early)
- Years active: 2006-2017
- Labels: NXSIE/Knowledge Alliance/PCI Music (2006-2009); HPQ (2009-2017)
- Members: Ryōhei; Inzargi; Gou
- Past members: Yūta
- Website: megamasso.jp

Megamasso (メガマソ, Megamaso) was a Japanese visual kei rock band. Their sound was lively and upbeat, with a unique mix of punk, piano ballads and pop rock.

Formerly signed to NXSIE Records, they are now connected to Avex Group's HPQ label. Since the release of "SWAN SONG", they have switched their label to Timely Records.

== Biography ==
Megamasso was formed by Ryōhei, ex-guitarist of Ayabie. He recruited members relatively new to music to produce a fresh, new sound. Their first mini-album, Namida Neko, released on December 6, was distributed through LIKE AN EDISON shops in Osaka, Tokyo, and Nagoya.

On December 16, Megamasso held their first show at Shibuya O-East, which was then filmed and released on DVD Mega-star Tokyo. This concert included unreleased songs which would be available on their second mini-album, Kai no Mokutō no Zokuryō, released January 24. Yūta decided to leave the band on June 9 because he was not interested in their gradually more poppy musical style, versus their original sound which was much more heavy.

Megamasso covered hide with Spread Beaver's "Rocket Dive" on the compilation Crush! 2 -90's V-Rock Best Hit Cover Songs-. The album was released on November 2ja:へすていあ3, 2011 and features current [[visual keija:さくらももこ]] bands covering songs from bands that were important to the '90s visual kei movement.

After 11 years together, Megamasso ended up officially disbanding on November 23, 2017.

== Members ==
- Ryōhei (涼平) - lead guitar (2006–2017)
- Inzargi (インザーギ) - vocals, additional guitar (2006–2017)
- Gou - bass (2006–2017)

Live members

- Shinya (信也) - drums (2015–2017)

Former members

- Yuta (優太) - drums (2006-2007)

Former live members

- Leo (レオ) - rhythm guitar (2006-2007)
- Akihiro Goto - drums (2007-2009)
- Masahiro Sakurai - drums (2009-2010)
- Sala (セラ) - drums (2010-2011)
- Yuusuke (悠介) - drums (2012-2013)
- Mikami - drums (2013-2015)

== Discography ==
=== Mini-albums ===
- Namida Neko (涙猫) (December 6, 2006)
1. Namida Neko (涙猫)
2. Goshiki Tōru Ten Mazochī (伍式融天マゾチー)
3. Dāshā Do Jin no Odori (ダーシャード人の踊り)
4. A Morning Ray Is Cold.
5. Sasquatch Ranker (サスクワッチランカー)
6. Shibō no Katamari (脂肪の塊)
- Kai no Mokutō no Zokuryō (櫂の目塔の属領) (January 24, 2007)
1. The Majority Loves Killstar
2. Full Nelson 2nd Attack
3. Meteo
4. Mothermage=Bounce
5. Tō wa Kōyō Suru. (塔は高揚する。)
6. Yoru, Sakana, Kaze, Tsurarina (よる、さかな、かぜ、つらりな)
7. Umibe ga Chikai Tame, Sabitsuki Yasui Mono wa Mochikomi Shite wa Naranai. (海辺が近いため、錆び付きやすいも のは持込してはならない。)
8. Dream to Secret Room (ドリムトシクレトルム)

=== Albums ===
- Yuki Shitatari Hoshi (ゆきしたたりほし{通常盤}) (March 21, 2007)
1. Shingetsu No Mizutamari Yori (新月の水たまりより)
2. Throne Angel (トローネエンゼル)
3. FM1
4. Blanco (鞦韆)
5. Number Midi.
6. Tenrankai no Neriori (展覧会のネリオリ)
7. Bullet Song
8. Yawarakai Kōshō, Shinkai (柔らかい鉱床、深海)
9. Paradisa Halo (パラディサヘイロー)
10. Laughter at Lump of Flesh
11. Mandrake Usagi Konagusuri (マンドレイクウサギコナグスリ)
- Matataku Yoru (またたくよる) (October 21, 2007)
1. Gyūnū(mjolk) (牛乳（mjolk）)
2. Lips
3. Monoeye Old Team
4. Ame Gakkitai (雨楽器隊)
5. Gymnasium (ギムナジウム)
6. Put a Whammy
7. Yukikokoyashi (ユキココヤシ)
8. A Winter's Day
9. Menō (めのう)
10. Hoshi Furi Machi Nite (星降町にて)
11. Modern Amplifier (モダンアンプリファイア)
12. Love You So... *Regular edition only
- Untitled (Best Album) (タイトル未定) (March 19, 2008)
- Sweet Switch (July 8, 2009)
1. The World Is Mine (ザワールドイズマイン)
2. White, White
3. In the Shadow of the Lyrics
4. Air Station Dance (エアステイシヨンダンス)
5. Howling Fragment
6. Bless
7. Sugarless Nocturne (シュガーレスノクターン)
8. Sodababe Nigao (そだばべ似顔)
9. Seinaru kana Seinaru kana Seinaru kana Kouri Usagi Tachi to (聖なるかな聖なるかな聖なるかな、氷うさぎたちと。)
10. Shakku (赤口)
11. Beautiful Girl (ビューティフルガール)
12. Kobune Okiba no Ie (小船置き場の家)
- M of Beauty (March 10, 2010)
1. M of Beauty
2. Chimes
3. Happily Mosh Floor, Headbanging Song (ハピリーモッシュフロア，ヘッドバンギングソング)
4. Awake
5. Wasurenagusa (ワスレナグサ)
6. Yon no Kissakan Monogatari (四の喫茶館物語)
7. Maegami, Deformer sareta Kayoukyoku wo Tsukuru (前髪、ディフォルメされた歌謡曲を作る。)
8. Torisarideishi's Love
9. Hakuya no Shouwakusei (白夜の小惑星)
10. Memories
11. Megumu Misa Dame Kitazora ni Naku no (メグムミサダメキタゾラニナクノ)
12. Eyes
13. Sense of Stargazer (センスオブスターゲーザー) [Regular track only]
- Loveless, More Loveless (February 16, 2011)
1. Sekai no owari no jellyfish (世界の終わりのジェリーフィッシュ) [Jellyfish at the End of the World]
2. Loveless, More Loveless
3. Hakuginshoujo (白銀少女) [Silver Woman]
4. Kagomekagome in Tokyo Night (かごめかごめin Tokyo Night)
5. Wonder Wall Sunset
6. Tasukete (たすけて) [Help Me]
7. Fate
8. Pandemonium, Hakken (パンデモニウム、発見。) [Pandemonium, Discovery]
9. The Requiem
10. Shizukana kuchiduke de、asa no aisatsu wo ( 静かなくちづけで、朝の挨拶を。) [Morning Greeting, By a Quiet Kiss.]
11. Twilight Star (トワイライトスター)
12. Hanabira (花びら) [Fireworks]
13. Sumire September Love (feat. IZAM) (すみれSeptember Love feat. IZAM) [Violet September Love]
14. Until (Regular Edition)
- Ugokanaku naru made, suki de ite. (動かなくなるまで、好きでいて。) (April 10, 2013)
1. Ugokanaku naru made, suki de ite. (動かなくなるまで、好きでいて。)
2. Mochi miga kubo (望ミガ窪)
3. SurrenderPowerPlant no kanshu (SurrenderPowerPlantの看守)
4. fish tank
5. The girl died when bound (Kare no omoide) (ザガールダイドホエンバウンド(カレノオモイデ))
6. Suibotsu jiin (水没寺院)
7. Yuki wa mada furisosoi de iru ka? (雪はまだ降り注いでいるか?)
8. SWAN SONG
9. Bezoarstein (ベゾアルステーン)
10. WINTER HOLLOW
11. Umibe no machi -SE- [available in Limited Edition Type A only]
12. Saigo no yoru ni Kiss wo shite (最後の夜にKissをして) [available in Regular Edition Type B only]
13. Bankoku satou hinpyoukai (Saiyuushuu kanmishou jushou) (万国砂糖品評会(最優秀甘味賞受賞)) [available in Regular Edition Type B only]
- M4U. (August 2, 2014)

=== Singles ===
- Hoshi Furi Machi Nite (星降町にて) (June 6, 2007)
1. Hoshi Furi Machi Nite (星降町にて)
2. Sdot Initial Value
3. Sanmanganjin (サマンガンジン)
4. Imomushi no Nushi (芋虫の主)
- Lips (August 15, 2007)
1. Lips
2. Blue V-neck Japan (ブルーブイネックジャパン)
3. In Pinkey Jelly tonight
4. Nijūrokunin no Bōzu to Hitori no Ama (二十六人の坊主と一人の尼)
- Kiss Me Chuchu (キスミイチュチュ) (February 20, 2008)
1. Kiss Me Chuchu (キスミイチュチュ)
2. Wosare Cat Showbiz (ヲサレキャットショウビズ)
3. Kiss Me Chuchu (Inzargi-less version) (キスミイチュチュ（インザーギチューless ver.）)
- Beautiful Girl (ビューティフルガール) (August 8, 2008)
1. Beautiful Girl (ビューティフルガール)
2. Mitsu to ga (蜜と蛾)
3. Shakunetsu taiyou (灼熱太陽)
- White, White (September 24, 2008)
1. White, White
2. Shizuka na hoshi shizuka na hitobito (しずかなほし しずかなひとびと)
3. Fukan no tsubasa (俯瞰の翼)
- Bless (March 25, 2009)
1. Bless
2. Hadairo (肌色)
3. Kikai ka jin madison no tomodachi (機械化人マディソンの友達)
- Chimes (October 7, 2009)
1. Chimes
2. Kanashimi no Kyouri (悲しみの距離)
3. Kingusudoon (キングスドーン) (King's Dawn)
4. chimes [instrumental]
- Memories (January 27, 2010)
1. Memories
2. Sweet Change
3. Kunkutatoru Ranbu (クンクタトル乱舞)
4. Memories [instrumental]
- Twilight Star (May 26, 2010)
1. Twilight Star (トワイライトスター)
2. Palette (パレット)
3. Junsui baiyou (純粋培養)
4. From Far
5. Twilight Star (instrumental)
- Hanabira 「花びら」(August 25, 2010)
1. Hanabira (花びら)
2. Moon
3. Oborozuki (unplugged) (朧月)
4. AmberFlight
5. Hanabira (instrumental)
- Yuki wa mada furisosoide iru ka? (雪はまだ降り注いでいるか？; Is the snow falling yet?, January 18, 2012)
1. Yuki wa mada furisosoide iru ka? (雪はまだ降り注いでいるか？)
2. Namida Neko-sound asleep mix- (涙猫)(included in limited edition TYPE B)
3. Kimi wa maibotsurin ni mukau (君は埋没林に向う。)(included in limited edition TYPE A & regular edition)
4. Sore wa shiroi hikari to kuroi kage (それは白いひかりと黒いかげ。)(included in limited edition TYPE A & regular edition)
5. Bankoku satou Hinpyoukai (万国砂糖品評会)(included in regular edition)
- SWAN SONG (July 18, 2012)
1. SWAN SONG
2. Kyuuraman (キュラーマン)
3. Kiss-go-round
- BEZOARSTEIN (October 3, 2012)
1. BEZOARSTEIN (ベゾアルステーン)
2. Shellfish (セルフィッシュ)
3. Hysteresis (ヒステリシス)
- Winter Hollow (December 12, 2012)
1. WINTER HOLLOW
2. Gokkan (ゴッカン)
3. Shoku (燭)
- Nakigoe de kizuita (泣き声で気づいた。, August 7, 2013)
1. Nakigoe de kizuita (泣き声で気づいた。)
2. Jibeta yotsunbai tarou (地ベタ四ツン這イ太郎)*
3. Manatsu no yo no yume(instrumental) (まなつのよのゆめ) [available in Limited Edition CD only]
4. Kyuuyakugiten houkouhahen (旧約偽典咆哮破片) [available in Regular Edition Type A only]
5. Sagashi motomete(instrumental) (さがしもとめて) [available in Regular Edition Type A only]
6. Kyuuyakugiten asa no hikari wa tsumetai (旧約偽典あさのひかりはつめたい) [available in Regular Edition Type B only]
7. Tsumetai asayake(instrumental) (つめたいあさやけ) [available in Regular Edition Type B only]

*The lyrics of "地ベタ四ツン這イ太郎 (Jibeta yotsunbai tarou)" will have slight differences in different types.

=== DVDs ===
- Mega-star Tokyo (February 21, 2007)
- DVD
1. Namida Neko (涙猫)
2. Goshiki Tōru Ten Mazochī (伍式融天マゾチー)
3. Full Nelson 2nd Attack
4. Dāshā Do Jin no Odori (ダーシャード人の踊り)
5. A Morning Ray Is Cold
6. Umibe ga Chikai Tame, Sabitsuki Yasui Mono wa Jikomi Shite wa Naranai. (海辺が近いため、錆び付きやすいも のは持込してはならない。)
7. Tō wa Kōyō Suru. (塔は高揚する。)
8. Sask Watch Ranker (サスクワッチランカー)
9. Meteo
10. Viper (バイパー)
11. Shibō no Katamari (脂肪の塊)
12. The Majority Loves Killstar.
13. New Romancer (ニューロマンサー)

CD

1. Paradisa Halo (パラディサヘイロー)
2. Traum
- Lunch Box M4 (July 18, 2007)
1. Namida Neko (涙猫)
2. Dream to Secret Room (ドリムトシクレトルム)
3. Throne Angel (トローネエンゼル)
4. Hoshi Furi Machi Nite (星降町にて)
5. Imomushi no Nushi (芋虫の主)

== Watashime Slug ==
Ryōhei is producing for the band Watashime Slug (ワタシメスラッグ, Watashimesuraggu), which has members Leo (レオ, Reo), a former support guitarist for Megamasso, and Soshi (総史), a vocalist. Their debut album, Jūryoku, was released on August 22, 2007 and distributed through Like an Edison shops in Tokyo, Osaka, Nagoya, and Harajuku.

== In media ==
The songs "Hoshi Furi Machi Nite" and "Sanmanganjin" were featured on Livly Island, and "Lips" is opening theme for Anitere Jōhōkyoku.

純粋培養 "Junsui Baiyou" is featured in Guitar Freaks V6 & DrumMania V6 Blazing!!!!. The song's video uses various clips of previous Megamasso songs. According to Gou, the song will be only heard in the video game or played live.

The short song of Twilight Star (トワイライトスター) is made 1st ending song of manga Major S6
