= Ayabie =

Japanese visual kei rock band

- Origin: Japan
- Genres: Pop rock; alternative rock
- Years active: 2004-2010, 2019
- Labels: Tokuma Japan Communications (Japan); CJL (Europe)
- Members: Aoi
- Past members: Ryōhei; Takehito; Intetsu; Kenzo; Yumehito
- Website: www.ayabie.net

Aoi from Ayabie
- Origin: Japan
- Genres: Rock; pop
- Years active: 2010-present
- Label: Tokuma Japan Communications
- Website: www.aoism.com

AYABIE
- Origin: Japan
- Genres: Pop rock; alternative rock
- Years active: 2010-present
- Labels: Happinet; Toy's Factory
- Members: Takehito
- Past members: Intetsu; Kenzo; Yumehito; Taito
- Website: www.ayabie.co.jp

ayabie (彩冷える（アヤビエ）) is a Japanese visual kei rock band signed to the label Tokuma Japan Communications. Their music consisted of a wide variety of sounds and moods, ranging from catchy and upbeat to heavy and hard-edged punk songs. Many of the band's costumes were designed by ID Japan or H. Naoto. In 2010, Kenzo, Intetsu, Yumehito and Takehito left the band because they did not share the direction taken after going major, and formed a new band also called "Ayabie", but written as "AYABIE". They are currently signed to the major company TOY'S FACTORY. Aoi remained in Tokuma Japan Communications as a solo artist, known as "Aoi from ayabie".

== Biography ==
Ayabie was formed in the early spring of 2004 by ex-Hinawana members Ryōhei, Takehito, and Intetsu with Aoi (ex-MASK, ex-Cynical Biscuit). On May 8, 2004, Ayabie held their first solo concert at the Takadanobaba AREA. Their first single, Heien No Ato, Ame, was distributed at this live. Following this release was their next single, Romancer, which was limited to 1000 copies,

Ayabie's debut album was released on March 21, 2005, entitled Ayabie Sokukan Ongenshū. It includes a bonus DVD which contains their previously recorded PVs. The group, which started with only support drummers, finally had a permanent drummer when Kenzo joined later that year. In June 2006, Ayabie toured Europe for the first time. In August, Ryōhei left the band permanently, due to his disagreement of the band's future. After his departure, he started his own new band, "Megamasso". Yumehito became the newest member of Ayabie 3 months later. The band adjusted to the change by splitting song writing duties among the band members, with Yumehito writing most of the band's music. In 2007, Ayabie returned to Europe again and released the mini-album Ecumenical along with many singles. Ayabie toured in the US for the first time in June 2008, as part of their world tour.

At the conclusion of their "Mikazuki no Kiseki" Tour on September 27, 2008, Ayabie announced that as of Spring 2009 they would be going major. Their first major label release, the single "Aitakute", was issued on 27 May 2009. As saying goodbye to their indies theme, they released a DVD named "The 7th colour ~Indies last tour FINAL~"; this indicates that they were then going major and going into their new major theme. Ayabie released their first major album '彩- irodori' on 27 January 2010.

On August 7, 2010, it was announced that Takehito, Intetsu, Kenzo and Yumehito had left Ayabie to form a new band, "AYABIE". They were signed to the major company TOY'S FACTORY. Aoi remained in Tokuma Japan Communications as a solo artist, known as "Aoi from ayabie". He also worked together with Ryohei from Megamasso as "Aoi & Ryohei". AYABIE performed at A-Kon 2011.

On May 21, 2012, Aoi started a new project called 168 -one sixty eight- with his debut single being "Setsugekka." The support members of 168's debut live were Yuki (Aucifer), Sebastian (Bull Zeichen 88), and Naoki (ex-Kagrra).

On February 24, 2013, Taito joined AYABIE as their keyboardist. His first appearance with the band was at Shibuya O-EAST, which marked the end of AYABIE's live hiatus they went on half a year before. On June 14, 2013, Kenzo announced his departure from AYABIE. He later started his own solo project called BVCCI HAYNES. On December 10, 2013, Yumehito and Intetsu both withdrew from AYABIE. Takehito and Taito continued band activities until July 31, 2015, in which Taito withdrew from the band as well.

== Members ==
Members of AYABIE

- Takehito (タケヒト): Born August 24, 1982, in Setagaya, Tokyo. He was the guitarist of Ayabie and is currently playing guitar in AYABIE.

Current member of Ayabie

- Aoi (葵): Born April 1, 1980, is the vocalist of Ayabie. Currently working solo under the alias 168-Aoi.
- Takehito (タケヒト): Born August 24, 1982, in Setagaya, Tokyo. is the guitarist of Ayabie and is currently playing guitar in AYABIE.
- Intetsu (インテツ): Born February 1, 1983, in Taiwan. is the bassist for both Ayabie and AYABIE.
- Kenzo (ケンゾ): Born December 9, 1982, in Setagaya, Tokyo. is the drummer for both Ayabie and AYABIE. Currently he stands as the vocalist for his own solo project, BVCCI HAYNES, and is the drummer for Hitsugi of Nightmare's solo project, 'Gremlins'
- Yumehito (夢人): Born September 22, 1985, in Yokkaichi, Mie Prefecture. is the guitarist of Ayabie and is the vocalist of AYABIE. Currently he is participating as a vocalist in a session band called Robin, as well as playing guitar for the limited comeback of his previous band, Soroban. He is also the guitarist of BELLE.

Former members

- Ryōhei (涼平): Born March 27, 1983. He was the guitarist for Ayabie, but left the band in 2006 and went on to form Megamasso (2006-2017). He is currently a member of Migimimi Sleep Tight (2016–present).
- Taito: Keyboardist for AYABIE.

== Discography ==
=== Ayabie ===
Albums

- Ayabie Sokukan Ongenshū (アヤビエ 即完音源集) (March 21, 2005)
- Virgin Snow Color (バージン スノー カラー, Bājin Sunō Karā) (November 15, 2006) Oricon Weekly Singles Chart Position: 77
- Euro Best (August 9, 2006)
- Irodori (彩 -irodori-) (2010) Oricon Weekly Singles Chart Position: 18
- Jisuru Moratorium (辞するモラトリアム) (August 24, 2019)

EPs

- Tetsu no Shima (鉄の島) (January 1, 2005)
- Equal Prayer 2 All(限定盤) (October 26, 2005)
- Ecumenical (エキュメニカル, Ekyumenikaru) (March 7, 2007)
- Rikkaboshi (November 28, 2007)

Singles

- "Heien No Ato, Ame" (閉園の後、雨) (May 8, 2004)
- "Romancer/Metamorph Last Page" (ロマンサー／変態最終頁) (May 8, 2004)
- "Metamorph Last Page/Romancer/Kagen Sakura" (変態最終頁／ロマンサー／下弦櫻) (July 17, 2004)
- "Ayabie no Orugōru Ongen Vol.1" (アヤビエのオルゴール音源vol.1) (July 30, 2004)
- "Chōsui Sō Yori, San Rin" (貯水槽より、三人) (September 15, 2004)
- "Gothic Party" (ゴシックパーティー) (October 15, 2004) Oricon Weekly Singles Chart Position: 82
- "Lovers Name" (ラバーズネーム) (December 29, 2004)
- "M" (エム) (February 10, 2005) Oricon Weekly Singles Chart Position: 80
- "Melting Cinnamon" (メルトインシナモン) (March 1, 2005)
- "Kuroi Tsukasa Saguito Shinegai -Second Press-" (クロイツカササグイトシネガイ -セカンドプレス-) (April 25, 2005)
- "Taikanshiki Zenya" (戴冠式前夜) (June 15, 2005) Oricon Weekly Singles Chart Position: 75
- "Tsuki Koi" (月請い) (July 13, 2005) Oricon Weekly Singles Chart Position: 76
- "Kiss Me Snow" (キスミイスノウ) (August 10, 2005) Oricon Weekly Singles Chart Position: 57
- "Lempicka" (December 7, 2005)
- "Mafuyu, Yonrenyasō" (真冬、四連夜奏) (January 18, 2006) Oricon Weekly Singles Chart Position: 62
- "Japanese Low-Res Caramel Town" (ジャパニーズ ロウレゾ キャラメルタウン) (February 15, 2006) Oricon Weekly Singles Chart Position: 45
- "Chō" (蝶) (March 31, 2006)
- "Faint/Topaz" (Faint／トパーズ) (June 28, 2006) Oricon Weekly Singles Chart Position: 39
- "N.M. Gentei Ongen Shū" (エヌエムゲンテイオンゲンシュウ) (August, 2006)
- "Kimi no Koe to Yakusoku" (君の声と約束) Type A and B (November 1, 2006) Oricon Weekly Singles Chart Position: 79
- "Garasuzaiku no Ohanashi" (硝子細工のお話) (January 7, 2007)
- "Browny" (ブラウニー) (March 14, 2007)
- "-Ecumenicalimage-" (April 8, 2007)
- "Sakura Mau Kisetsu ni" (桜舞う季節に) Type A and B (April 25, 2007) Oricon Weekly Singles Chart Position: 59
- "Cubic'「L/R」ock" (June 27, 2007) Oricon Weekly Singles Chart Position: 29
- "Extreme Machine" (エクストリーム・マシーン) (September 14, 2007)
- "Yubisaki" (September 26, 2007) Oricon Weekly Singles Chart Position: 43
- "Day Dream" (October 6, 2007)
- "Meltaway" (March 19, 2008) Oricon Weekly Singles Chart Position: 17
- "Mikazuki no Kiseki" (ミカヅキノキセキ) (June 25, 2008) Oricon Weekly Singles Chart Position:
- "Aitakute (会いたくて) (May 27, 2009) Oricon Weekly Singles Chart Position: 12
- "Natsu Monogatari (夏物語) (August 19, 2009) Oricon Weekly Singles Chart Position: 10
- "Sayonara (サヨナラ) (December 2, 2009) Oricon Weekly Singles Chart Position: 11
- "Dramatic (ドラマティック) (June 16, 2010) Oricon Weekly Singles Chart Position: 10
- "Mousou Nikki" (妄想日記) (December 11, 2013)

DVDs

- Daikei/Misery in the Dusk (台形／ミザリィインザダスク) (December 21, 2004)
- 1 Dan Tobi -2005.4.1 Shibuya O-East- (1段飛び ～2005.4.1 SHIBUYA O-EAST～) (August 20, 2005)
- Tokyo-Prayer (February 1, 2006)
- Tokyo-Rock Show (May 24, 2006)
- Ayabie Sokukan Eizoushū (アヤビエ即完映像集) (July 19, 2006)
- Film Spiral (フィルムスパイラル) (February 13, 2008)
- The 7th Colour ~Indies last tour FINAL~(September 9, 2009)
- SummerTour'07 「The Brilliant Parade」 Final at HIBIYA YAGAI DAIONGAKUDO(November 28, 2007)
- spring tour'07 ecumenical image ～C.C.Lemon~(June 13, 2007)
- -ecumenicalimage-

=== Aoi from Ayabie ===
Albums

- ONE (January 19, 2011)
- Joukei narabini nodo, Yubisaki (February 15, 2012)
- "Gekijou Squall" (November 9, 2012)

EPs

- symmetry (September 14, 2011)

Singles

- "MI DA RA" (September 8, 2010)
- "Surrender Love" (November 24, 2010)
- "Break out" (March 15, 2011)
- "beauty girl" (March 15, 2011)
- "Yume no Kanata e" (夢の彼方へ) (April 17, 2011)
- "pray" (May 12, 2011)
- "Setsugekka" (August 8, 2012)
- "Hisureba Hana" (July 10, 2013)
- "Hitsuyou Aku" (January 15, 2014)

DVDs

- Starting Over ～LIVE! LIVE!! La EVE!!!～ (May 25, 2011)

=== AYABIE ===
Albums

- Virgin Snow Color -2nd Season- (December 1, 2010)
- ANSWER (August 22, 2012)

Singles

- "Melody" (February 23, 2011)
- "Ryūsei" (流星) (August 24, 2011)
- "Merry Go Round" (メリーゴーランド) (January 25, 2011)
- "Kakusei Sprechor" (覚醒シュプレヒコール) (May 16, 2012)
- "Splash" (August 21, 2013)
- "Natsu, Yoru no Yume Hana to Chiru" (夏、夜の夢 花と散る) (September 25, 2013)
- "Kanon/Keep Going On" (July 31, 2015)

DVDs

- Virgin snow color-2nd season (March 23, 2011)
