= Mousou Nikki =

2004 song by SID

Song by SID

from the album Renai
- Language: Japanese
- English title: Delusional Diary
- Length: 3:50
- Label: Danger Crue
- Composer: Shinji
- Lyricist: Mao
- Producer: Sakura

"Mousou Nikki" (妄想日記, Mōsō nikki; Delusional Diary) is a 2004 song by Japanese rock band SID, composed by guitarist Shinji with lyrics written by vocalist Mao. It was originally released as the ninth track of their debut album Renai on December 22, 2004. In 2009, the band released the sequel "Mousou Nikki 2" on the album Hikari.

== Composition and themes ==
The lyrics of "Mousou Nikki" describe an obsessed fan who stalks her favorite musician until she goes to his house and discovers his flaws. Mao says that when writing the lyrics, he found a "great" but "bad theme", comparing it to the old single "Yoshikai Manabu, 17-sai (Mushoku)".

== Popularity ==
Despite being an ordinary album track, "Mousou Nikki" became a representative SID song. It is played at most concerts and is featured on all live albums. In a poll conducted by Recochoku among its users to choose the band's most popular song, it ranked fifth. It was included in Oricon top 1 best of album Sid 10th Anniversary Best, along with "Mousou Nikki 2".

== Cover versions ==
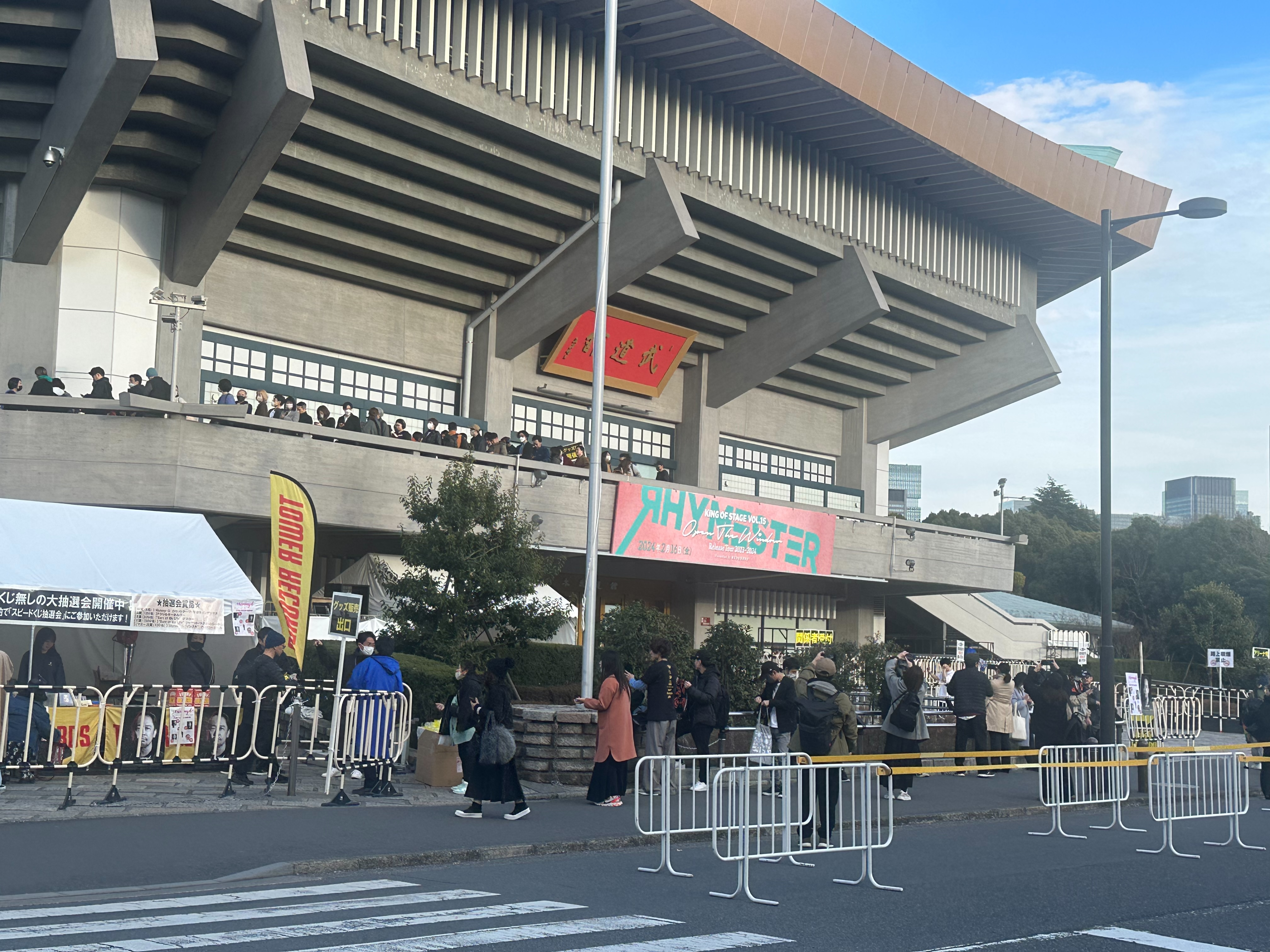
The Visual BANG! event at Nippon Budokan (pictured) lasted eight hours.

In 2013, one of the projects commemorating SID's ten-year career brought ten artists to record a cover of "Mousou Nikki". They were DIV, ν[NEU], Kameleo, Moran, DaizyStripper, Zoro, Ayabie, Alice Juuban×Steam Girls, R-Shitei, and DOG inThePWO, most of whom are visual kei artists.

On December 27, the event 'Visual BANG! ~ SID 10th Anniversary FINAL PARTY' took place at Nippon Budokan with SID and the participating bands. Each guest performed between 4 and 5 songs, except for the hosts SID, who performed 11. ν[NEU], Moran, and Ayabie did not perform their versions of "Mousou Nikki". The show ended with "Mousou Nikki" being performed together with all the vocalists, and "Dear Tokyo" being performed with all the instrumentalists.

The artists participating in the 10-year project released their respective cover versions as original singles on December 11, 2013, including music videos.

- DIV released the single in two versions, regular and limited, through SID's original label Danger Crue, with the B-side song "Justice". CD Journal praised the vocals and described the band's sound as "heavy".
- ν[NEU] released it in two versions, with a B-side "Mousou Seppun", reaching 12th place on Oricon Singles Chart and 5th place on Tower Records' Japanese rock and pop singles chart. Their "Mousou Nikki" cover was featured as ending song for the Japanese television program Black Million. The band promoted the single in various ways, such as requiring a certain number of views on the YouTube music video of "Mousou Seppun" to play the song live. CD Journal commented that the band arranged their cover like a Christmas song.
- Kameleo also released their single in a regular and a limited edition by Danger Crue. The regular version contains two original bonus tracks, and the limited-edition version contains a DVD with the music video and its making-of, as well as a video commentary by the band members. It reached 34th place at Oricon.
- Moran released "Mousou Nikki" in two types, with the limited edition containing two versions of the cover and the regular edition containing three original tracks by the band. It reached 25th place on the Oricon charts.
- DaizyStripper released their single in five types, adding original B-sides and live recordings in them. It ranked ninth at Oricon.
- Zoro recorded "Mousou Nikki" with their signature electronic arrangement, according to CD Journal. The single was released in types A and B, each containing the "white" version and the "black" version. It also added other original songs, including one remixed by TeddyLoid.
- Ayabie's single contains four covers of "Mousou Nikki", each composed by one of the band members, and its cover art references the cover of SID's single "Yoshikai Manabu, 17-sai (Mushoku)".
- Two teams of the female idol group Kamen Joshi, Alice Juuban and Steam Girls, recorded the cover together and released it as a single in several versions. The second track of the single, "Amatsuchi", is featured on Shin Megami Tensei: Imagine game soundtrack.
- R-Shitei released their single in two versions, with a re-recording of their songs "Haranbanjyou-Tsubakiuta" and "Kurainichiyoubi" (the latter exclusive to the regular version). The limited version includes a DVD with the cover's music video and their making-of. The cover of the singles features a flower similar to the one on Renai's cover. It reached fourth place in Oricon's indie singles ranking and 29th place in the main ranking.
- DOG inThePWO's single included the B-side "many many Daily" and ranked 34th on Oricon.

Shō Kiryūin also covered "Mousou Nikki" on his fan-selected cover album, Utate Kiririnpa.

== Personnel ==
- Mao – vocals
- Shinji – guitar
- Aki – bass
- Yūya – drums

Other musicians

- Sakura – producer
