= Cardfight!! Vanguard G: Z =

- Official poster
- No. of episodes: 24

Release
- Original network: TV Tokyo
- Original release: October 8, 2017 – April 1, 2018

Series chronology
- ← Previous; NEXT Next → V Series

Cardfight!! Vanguard G: Z is the fifth and final season of Cardfight!! Vanguard G and the ninth season overall in the Cardfight!! Vanguard series and the final chapter of The TRY 3 Saga. It began airing in Japan on October 8, 2017.

== Plot ==
A group of six units from Planet Cray, called the "Apostles", have invaded Earth. Armed with the power of the six Zeroth Dragons, the Apostles aim to revive the sealed Dragon Deity of Destruction, Gyze who attempted to destroy Cray in the past. The final battle between the Vanguards and the Dragon Deity of Destruction begins. In order for Gyze to move freely on earth, The Apostles target Chrono, because of him being the singularity point for Gear Chronicle. Team Try 3 must reunite and master the power of Dimensional Overstride, or lose those they care about to the Dragon Deity of Destruction.

== Theme songs ==
Japanese

Opening theme

- "Jou no Hana" by Kiryu (eps. 1–24)

Ending theme

- "-HEROIC ADVENT-" by Roselia (eps. 1–24)

English

Opening theme

- "Hello, Mr. Wonder land" by Ayako Nakanomori (eps. 1–24)

Ending theme

- "Wing of Image" by RUMMY LABYRINTH (eps. 1–24)

== Main characters ==
- Chrono Shindou – Uses Gear Chronicle, with Chronojet Dragon as the main theme
- Shion Kiba – Uses Royal Paladin, with Altmile as the main theme
- Tokoha Anjou – Uses Neo Nectar, with Asha as the main theme
- Kazuma Shouji – Uses Shadow Paladin, with Luard as the main theme
- Taiyou Asukawa – Uses Gold Paladin, with Gurguit as the main theme
- Aichi Sendou – Uses Royal Paladin, with Blaster as the main theme
- Kouji Ibuki – Uses Link Joker, with Messiah as the main theme

== Antagonists ==
- Kazuma Shouji/Gyze – Uses Shadow Paladin along with the addition of "Zeroth Dragon of Zenith Peak, Ultima"
- Arte Hibino/Gastille – Uses Dark Irregulars along with the addition of "Zeroth Dragon of End of the World, Dust"
- Ruga Kaizu/Valeos – Uses Aqua Force along with the addition of "Zeroth Dragon of Distant Sea, Megiddo"
- Gaily Kurt/Gredora – Uses Megacolony along with the addition of "Zeroth Dragon of Death Garden, Zoa"
- Sousuke Wakamizu/Darkface – Uses Megacolony along with the addition of "Zeroth Dragon of Death Garden, Zoa"
- Saori Fuchidaka/Dumjid – Uses Kagero along with the addition of "Zeroth Dragon of Inferno, Drachma"
- Noa Hoshizaki/Chaos Breaker – Uses Link Joker along with the addition of "Zeroth Dragon of Destroy Star, Stark"

== Episode list ==
No. overall	No. in season	Title	Directed by	Written by	Original release date
347 (151)	1	"Chrono Taken"; Transliteration: "Ubawareta Kurono" (Japanese: 奪われたクロノ)	Fumio Itō	Kazuhiko Inukai	October 8, 2017
U20 has ended and Noa Hoshizaki appears before Chrono and demands a cardfight.
348 (152)	2	"A Written Challenge from the Apostle"; Transliteration: "Shito kara no chōsen-jō" (Japanese: 使徒からの挑戦状)	Yūshi Suzuki	Kazuhiko Inukai	October 15, 2017
Dumjid pays Kouji Ibuki a surprise visit at his branch office. Ibuki stands against Dumjid, with his new Messiah.
349 (153)	3	"Blue Wave Marshal, Valeos"; Transliteration: "Aoba gensui Vareosu" (Japanese: 蒼波元帥ヴァレオス)	Shunichi Katō	Kenichi Yamada	October 22, 2017
Shion Kiba encounters Valeos, who seeks to obtain or destroy the sacred sword Fides. To ensure his goal, Valeos summons the forbidden Zeroth Dragon.
350 (154)	4	"Zeroth Dragon"; Transliteration: "Zerosu Doragon" (Japanese: ゼロスドラゴン)	Takahiro Majima	Ayumu Hisao	October 29, 2017
Chrono Shindou and Tsuneto encounter Gastille while trapped in Relics. Meanwhile, on Earth, Valeos challenges Taiyou Asukawa, using the power of his Zeroth Dragon.
351 (155)	5	"Dragon Burning with Vengeance"; Transliteration: "Fukushū ni moeru ryū" (Japanese: 復讐に燃える竜)	Yūshi Suzuki	Kenji Konuta	November 5, 2017
Kazuma Shouji and Kazumi Onimaru try to figure out a way to bring Chrono Shindou and his friends back to Earth. Dumjid, however, seeks revenge, and tries to stop Kazuma.
352 (156)	6	"Purging Overlord"; Transliteration: "Shukusei no Ōbārōdo" (Japanese: 粛清のオーバーロード)	Takayuki Murakami	Atsuo Ishino	November 12, 2017
Toshiki Kai, Arata Nishizawa, and Makoto Asada meet up with Kamui Katsuragi and Misaki Tokura, who plan on invading the Apostle's secret laboratory. Awaiting them was the diffrided Sousuke Wakamizu.
353 (157)	7	"Relics Crisis"; Transliteration: "Rerikusu Kuraishisu" (Japanese: レリクス・クライシス)	Fumio Itō	Kenichi Yamada	November 19, 2017
An illusion obstructs the fighters, who are fighting to destroy the Relics Generators around the world in order to save Chrono Shindou and the others that were taken. And the shocking scene that Chrono saw while fighting in Relics is...?
354 (158)	8	"The Future We Secured"; Transliteration: "Watashitachi ga tsukanda mirai" (Japanese: 私たちがつかんだ未来)	Noriyuki Nakamura	Kazuhiko Inukai	November 26, 2017
The scheming Dumjid aims for the recuperating Chrono. To protect Chrono and his friends, Tokoha Anjou stands up to the threat of the Zeroth Dragons with the card entrusted by Miguel's illusion.
355 (159)	9	"Evil Governor Gredora"; Transliteration: "Hyakugai Joō Guredōra" (Japanese: 百害女王グレドーラ)	Yūshi Suzuki	Kiyoko Yoshimura	December 3, 2017
Arata Nishizawa and Makoto Asada have reunited with Noa Hoshizaki, who was released from Chaos Breaker. However, the trio is ambushed by Gredora and Darkface, who were chasing Chaos Breaker.
356 (160)	10	"The Man's Finishing Hold"; Transliteration: "Otoko no Finisshu Hōrudo" (Japanese: 漢のフィニッシュホールド)	Fumio Itō	Ayumu Hisao	December 10, 2017
Kamui Katsuragi and Misaki Tokura reach Arata Nishizawa and Makoto Asada. Kamui, pushed by his fighting spirit and manly feelings, faces off against Gredora, the strongest enemy. Will Kamui be strong enough to defy the power of a Zeroth Dragon?!
357 (161)	11	"Evil God Bishop Gastille"; Transliteration: "Jashin shikyō gasutīru" (Japanese: 邪神司教ガスティール)	Takahiro Majima	Atsuo Ishino	December 17, 2017
Chrono Shindou and the others hold a Christmas Party for Arata Nishizawa and Makoto Asada after they return home to Japan. Meanwhile, Kouji Ibuki and Gastille face off in a dramatic showdown.
358 (162)	12	"The Curse Known as Fate"; Transliteration: "Unmei to iu na no noroi" (Japanese: 運命という名の呪い)	Osamu Sekita	Ayumu Hisao	December 24, 2017
Kouji Ibuki lays on the verge of death, then hands his Deck and Fight over to Chrono Shindou. Will Chrono be able to defeat Gastille with Ibuki's Deck?
359 (163)	13	"The Vessel of Gyze"; Transliteration: "Gīze no utsuwa" (Japanese: ギーゼの器)	Fumio Maezono	Kenji Konuta	January 7, 2018
The ones who target Chrono Shindou, the strongest candidate for becoming "Gyze's Vessel", are the three Apostles. Kazuma Shouji and Taiyou Asukawa fight to defend Chrono from the Zeroth Dragon of Star Gate, which is under the command of Chaos Breaker.
360 (164)	14	"The Beginning of the End"; Transliteration: "Owari no hajimari" (Japanese: 終わりの始まり)	Takayuki Murakami	Kazuhiko Inukai	January 14, 2018
Chrono Shindou, who reached to the place where Taiyou Asukawa and Kazuma Shouji fought, witnessed a spectacular scene. At the same time, the fight where Chrono definitely can't lose open its curtains.
361 (165)	15	"Sworn Fight"; Transliteration: "Chikai no Faito" (Japanese: 誓いのファイト)	Fumio Itō	Kiyoko Yoshimura	January 21, 2018
Units who have been at his side, and then Kazuma Shouji... Chrono Shindou was tormented by the loss of many precious things, and Kazumi Onimaru challenges him to a card fight. And the future that the two wished for at the end of the fight is――
362 (166)	16	"The Hope In Our Hands"; Transliteration: "Bokutachi ga te ni shita kibō" (Japanese: 僕たちが手にした希望)	Noriyuki Nakamura	Kazuhiko Inukai	January 28, 2018
In front of Shion Kiba who infiltrated the Apostles' headquarters, stands Valeos. In order to settle all pasts, Shion challenges Valeos again.
363 (167)	17	"The Land of Descent"; Transliteration: "Kōrin no ji" (Japanese: 降臨の地)	Yūshi Suzuki	Ayumu Hisao	February 4, 2018
TRY3 heads toward the "Land of Descent", the place where the Sword Saint Fides supposedly landed at once upon a time. There, the one waiting for those three is Chrono Shindou's father.
364 (168)	18	"Dawn of the Decisive Battle"; Transliteration: "Kessen no makuake" (Japanese: 決戦の幕開け)	Naoto Hashimoto	Kenichi Yamada	February 11, 2018
In order to completely revive Gyze, Apostles enter the North America Branch Association. Darkface, who seeks the destruction of the facility, is met by one of the members of the defense team, Misaki Tokura. Can Darkface be defeated for sure this time!?
365 (169)	19	"Choice of the Jester"; Transliteration: "Dōkeshi no sentaku" (Japanese: 道化師の選択)	Fumio Itō	Kiyoko Yoshimura	February 18, 2018
Aimed by Aichi Sendou and Toshiki Kai, Chaos Breaker shows itself-- In order to take back Noa Hoshizaki, what Arata Nishizawa and Makoto Asada arrived at is......!?! Aichi and Kai tags, challenging the titan that wields despair!!
366 (170)	20	"Dragon Deity of Destruction, Gyze"; Transliteration: "Hakai no Ryūjin Gīze" (Japanese: 破壊の竜神 ギーゼ)	Fumio Maezono	Ayumu Hisao	March 4, 2018
A decisive battle with reverse position from before begins!! In order to rescue Kazuma Shouji, Kazumi Onimaru challenges Gyze with all of his might. Alongside Shiranui with new powers, can Kazumi catch up to Gyze......!?
367 (171)	21	"Void and Vanguard"; Transliteration: "Kyomu to sendō-sha" (Japanese: 虚無と先導者)	Osamu Sekita	Kazuhiko Inukai	March 11, 2018
The world swallowed by "Void" and returns into nothingness, the ones who fight to prevent the world from being eroded by "Void" are vanguards, and their allies from all over the world......! The final battle of TRY3 vs Gyze begins!!
368 (172)	22	"TRY3"; Transliteration: "Toraisurī" (Japanese: 挑戦する3人(トライスリー))	Takayuki Murakami	Kiyoko Yoshimura	March 18, 2018
Units that claim "apostles" from Planet Clay descended to the earth. "Ryujin gauze of destruction" to destroy everything. "Apostles" who plan their resurrection invade the earth using the power of the six dragons "Zero Dragon"! Vanguard fighters, now stand up. Beyond fate, grasp the future under a bond that connects each other!
369 (173)	23	"Dimensional Overstride"; Transliteration: "Dimenshonaru Ōbāsutoraido" (Japanese: 時空超越)	Yūshi Suzuki	Kiyoko Yoshimura	March 25, 2018
Confronting Gyze with TRY3's thoughts and futures on the line. Their thoughts finally awaken the power of the Dimensional Overstride!
370 (174)	24	"EXTRA TURN"	Naoto Hashimoto; Kazuki Yokouchi; Akira Tsunoda	Ayumu Hisao; Kazuhiko Inukai; Kiyoko Yoshimura	April 1, 2018
Following the fight with Gyze, everyone has regained their peaceful daily lifes. The Quest System has been revived anew, as the adults throw a party and go to the barbecue. And then Chrono Shindou, aiming to become an astronaut, is seen at a study group.
