= Codomo Dragon =

Japanese visual kei band formed in 2010

- Origin: Tokyo, Japan
- Genres: Rock
- Years active: 2010–present
- Label: B.P Records
- Members: Hayato; Yume; meN-meN; Chamu
- Past members: Kana
- Website: https://codomo-dragon.net/

Codomo Dragon (コドモドラゴン) is a Japanese rock band of visual kei scene formed in 2010. Currently signed with B.P Records, their lineup consists of Hayato on vocals, Yume on guitar, meN-meN as bassist and Chamu on drums.

== Career ==
The band was formed in Tokyo in April 2010 and started performing in November, with Hayato on vocals, Yume and Kana on guitars, meN-meN as bassist and Chamu on drums.

In collaboration with the bands Kiryu and Royz they released the single "Family Party" on November 25, 2015.

On January 3, 2018, guitarist Kana was reported missing. Two days later, the band received a letter from Kana apologizing and wishing to leave the band.

On March 13, 2019, they released the album Tegura Magura in two editions.

== Members ==
=== Current ===
- Hayato (ハヤト) – vocals

All song lyrics are written by Hayato.

- Yume (ゆめ) – guitar
- meN-meN – bass
- Chamu (チャム) – drums

=== Former members ===
- Kana (華那) – guitar

== Discography ==
=== Studio albums ===
Title	Release	Oricon chart
Candy-Man	May 23, 2012	–
Children's Dope.	April 16, 2014	22
Gekokujō (下剋上。)	July 8, 2015	22
Wolfman	November 9, 2016	18
Tegura Magura (テグラマグラ)	March 13, 2019	27
Teiosekkai (帝王切開)	July 12, 2023	24
