= Jou no Hana/Oborezukiyo =

- Edition type A cover

Single by Kiryū

from the album Tenshō Rinne
- Language: Japanese
- Released: October 25, 2017
- Genre: Metal
- Label: B.P Records

Kiryū singles chronology
"Watashi wa Kairai, Sarugutsuwa no Ningyo" (2017)	"Jou no Hana/Oborezukiyo" (2017)	"Harushigure" (2018)

Music video
- "Jou no Hana" on YouTube "Oborezukiyo" on YouTube

"Jou no Hana/Oborezukiyo" (情ノ華/朧月夜) is the seventeenth single by Japanese rock band Kiryu, released on October 25, 2017. "Jou no Hana" is the opening theme song for Cardfight!! Vanguard G: Z.

== Promotion and release ==
"Jou no Hana/Oborezukiyo" was announced on August 13, 2017, at the final concert of the Kairo Kōrai tour at Toyosu Pit, as the opening theme for the anime Cardfight!! Vanguard G: Z. A 2007–2017 compilation album was also announced, along with a promotional tour for the single called Onmyō Rōka. The anime began airing on TV before the single’s release, on October 8.

The single was released in four editions, labeled A through D. Editions A and B were limited editions, each containing the two-track CD and a DVD with the music video of "Jou no Hana", then its making-of footage in Version A or the music video for “Oborezukiyo” in Version B. The other two, non-limited editions, include the CD with three songs (the title tracks and a bonus track) and their instrumental versions. All editions include two collectible cards of the band, with edition A also featuring two additional collectible cards of Cardfight!! Vanguard. The music video for the two tracks was released on YouTube in early November.

The Onmyō Rōka tour ran from November 1 to December 16, with the band alternating between the costumes from "Jou no Hana" and those from "Oborezukiyo" from one show to the next.

== Composition and themes ==
The JRock News and Barks websites described the first track on the single as "colorful", "elegant", and "sparkling", while the second is "dark", "heavy", and "insane". Jrock News concluded saying that they were quite dramatic and vivid, as is typical of Kiryu.

Similarly, CD Journal noted that “Jou no Hana” conveys a “powerful and positive” message, while the second track incorporates elements of heavy and death metal. The magazine also commented on the bonus track “Onajianomusjina", noting that it has a progressive side. Jrock News and CD Journal noted how the band's identity shines through, such as in their use of the koto.

== Commercial performance ==
The single reached No. 13 on Oricon Singles Chart and remained on chart for five weeks. On Tower Records' Japanese rock and pop singles chart, it reached second place.

== Track listing ==
Type A

No.	Title	Length
1.	"Jou no Hana" (情ノ華)	3:33
2.	"Oborezukiyo" (朧月夜)	3:20

- DVD: "Jou no Hana" music video and making-of

Type B

No.	Title	Length
1.	"Jou no Hana" (情ノ華)	3:33
2.	"Oborezukiyo" (朧月夜)	3:20

- DVD: "Oborezukiyo" music video and making-of

Type C

No.	Title	Length
1.	"Jou no Hana" (情ノ華)	3:33
2.	"Oborezukiyo" (朧月夜)	3:20
3.	"Onajianonomujina" (オナジアナノムジナ)	4:55
4.	"Jou no Hana" (Instrumental)	3:33
5.	"Oborezukiyo" (Instrumental)	3:20
6.	"Onajianonomujina" (Instrumental)	3:34

Type D

No.	Title	Length
1.	"Jou no Hana" (情ノ華)	3:33
2.	"Oborezukiyo" (朧月夜)	3:20
3.	"Setsugetsuka" (雪月花)	3:34
4.	"Jou no Hana" (Instrumental)	3:33
5.	"Oborezukiyo" (Instrumental)	3:20
6.	"Setsugetsuka" (Instrumental)	3:34

== Personnel ==
- Mahiro Kurosaki (黒崎眞弥, Kurosaki Mahiro) – vocals
- Takemasa Kujō (九条武政, Kujō Takemasa) – guitar
- Mitsuki Sakai (酒井参輝, Sakai Mitsuki) – guitar
- Hiyori Isshiki (一色日和, Isshiki Hiyori) – bass
- Junji Tokai (遠海准司, Tokai Junji) – drums
