= Menhera =

Japanese subculture

Menhera (Japanese: メンヘラ) is a Japanese slang term used to describe a person with a mental health condition. The term initially referred to users of a Japanese discussion board focused on mental health, but grew to describe people, typically women, who exhibited symptoms of borderline personality disorder as the term became more well-known. The term may refer to fictional characters with mental health issues or to participants in mental health-inspired fashion subculture.

== Etymology ==
Menhera translates to mental healther and originally referred to users of mentaru herusu ban, a 2channel discussion board about mental health. The term mentaru herusu, meaning mental health, was abbreviated by discussion board members to menheru. When users began improperly using menheru to refer to users of the board, menheraa was created in response, with the -aa suffix meaning "to do". Menheraa was later shortened to menhera.

== History ==
When it was established on November 21st, 1999, the mentaru herusu ban was named the sou-utsu ban (manic-depressive board). Users of the board wanted the board's name to reflect a wider spectrum of mental health conditions, causing the board to be renamed to the mentaru herusu ban sometime around August 19th, 2000. Before the term mentaru herusu, Japanese people referred to those with mental health conditions in ways that were either negative or specific to one condition. The first neutral, general term for mental health conditions in Japanese online communities is presumed to be mentaru herusu.

Suicide rates in Japan are notoriously high, yet the topic of mental health is considered taboo, so few people receive support. The mentaru herusu ban was a space for anonymous users to vent about their lives and discuss mental health issues, treatments, and therapies.

The term menhera began to spread past the mentaru herusu ban 2channel board around 2003, where it began to connote any person with a mental health condition. In 2005, the term saw use on a popular 2channel board, where it became closely associated with women, especially those who demonstrated traits of borderline personality disorder.

In 2010, searches for menhera spiked in frequency, and have increased since. Menhera was further popularized by Ezaki Bisko, who in 2013 created a Menhera-chan character which typified the subculture and the yami-kawaii (sick-cute) fashion aesthetic. Menhera and yami-kawaii both increased in popularity in Western countries in the late 2010s, with participants in the Western community citing misconceptions and stigmas around mental health issues as the reason for this rise in attention.

== Characteristics ==
=== In fiction ===
In a scholarly review of the menhera trope in fiction, researchers Yukari Seko and Minako Kikuchi distinguish between three subtypes of menhera woman: the sad girl, who experiences acute loneliness and alienation, the mad woman, who may exhibit unhealthy obsessive behavior towards their love interest, and the cutie, who embodies the fashion subculture associated with menhera. The authors noted that all forms of menhera may engage in some degree of self injury.

=== In fashion ===
A menhera outfit focuses on a specific health-related topic that the wearer is dealing with, making that the central theme of the outfit. While mental health related topics are common, outfits can also cover topics such as invisible disabilities and chronic illness. Comfort is common in menhera outfits, with baggy sweaters, leggings, and sweatpants made with soft materials sold by menhera designers. Outfits can be as simple or as elaborate as the wearer wants them to be. Makeup often includes pale foundation and blush under the eyes that makes the wearer look like they were recently crying. Because of Ezaki Bisuko's Menhera-chan, the yami-kawaii (sick cute) aesthetic is strongly associated with menhera. Yami-kawaii is a variation of the kawaii aesthetic characterized by darker motifs such as pills, syringes, razor blades, and bandages.

== See also ==
- Anti-social behaviour
- Denpa
- Mental illness in media
- Suicide and the Internet
- Yandere
