= Genkidane =

- Cover of Type-A edition.

Single by Kamen Joshi
- Released: January 1, 2015 (Japan)

Kamen Joshi singles chronology
"妄想日記" (2013)	"Genkidane" (2015)

"Genkidane" (元気種☆) is a single by Japanese idol girl group Kamen Joshi. It was released on January 1, 2015. It debuted in number one on the weekly Oricon Singles Chart, selling 131,513 copies.

== Track listing ==
=== Type-A ===
CD
No.	Title	Length
1.	"元気種☆"
2.	"マリン☆ロード"
3.	"あきばサンダルのうた～DO!!～"
4.	"アリス・イン・アンダーグラウンド"

== Charts ==
Chart (2015)	Peak position
Japan (Oricon Weekly Singles Chart)	1
