= Kamen Joshi =

Japanese idol group

Kamen Joshi 仮面女子
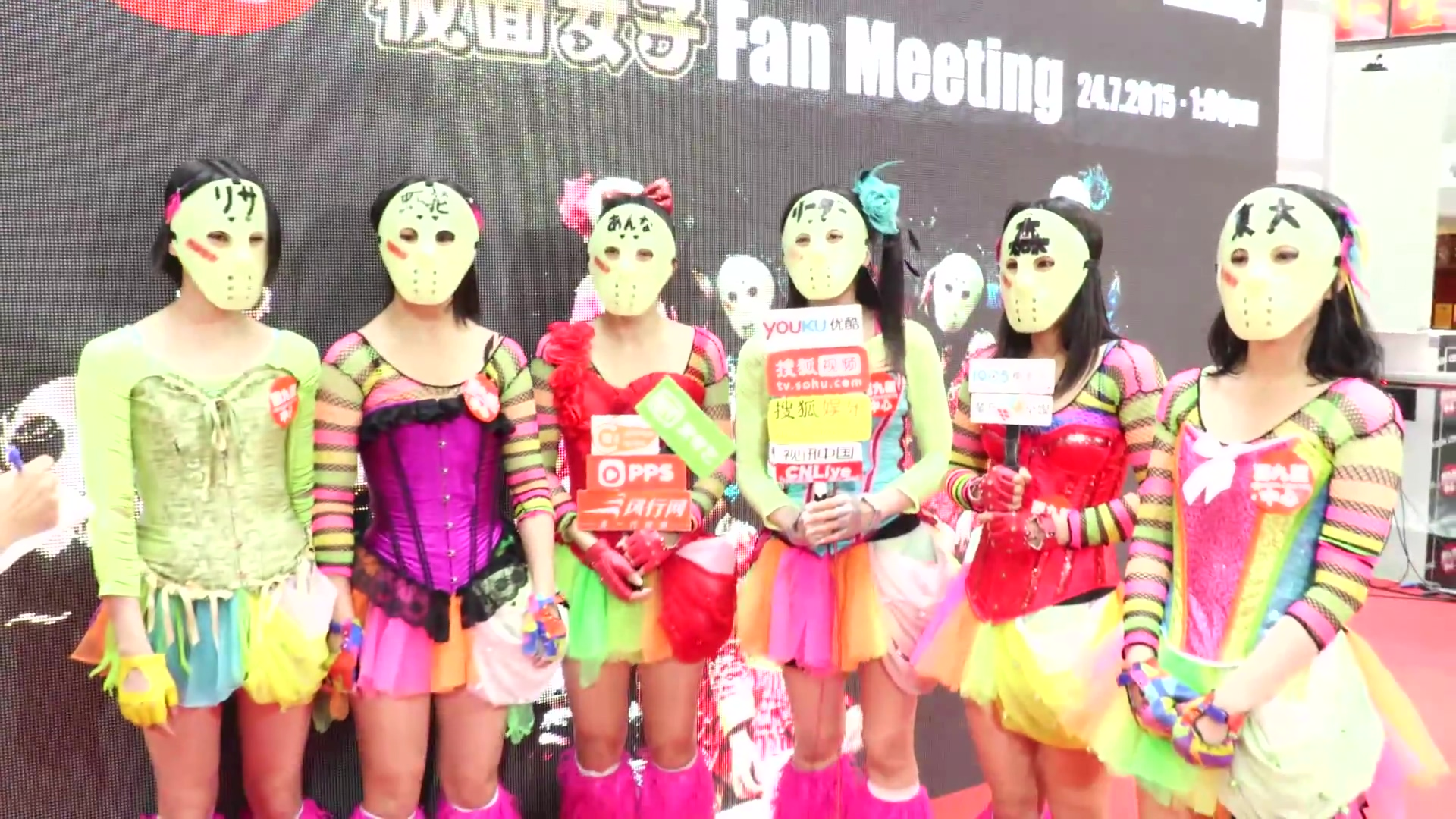

Background information
- Origin: Japan
- Genres: J-Pop, electropop, kawaii metal, folk rock, rap rock
- Years active: 2013–present
- Labels: Destroy Records (2013 - 2017); Neji Records (2021)
- Website: www.kamen-joshi.com

Kamen Joshi (仮面女子, Mask Girls) is a Japanese female idol group consisting of four teams. The name refers to the members of the group wearing masks which cover their faces during the performances of most songs and much of the promotional material, with the type of mask varying between the various subgroups. The music of Kamen Joshi is usually rock or heavy metal, often with rap verses. The members rarely play instruments themselves and most performances are presented with playback rather than with a live band. Kamen Joshi performs daily at the P.A.R.M.S theater in Akihabara, Tokyo or the Kamen Joshi Theater in Osaka.

Kamen Joshi became the first independent female artist to achieve a number-one single on the Oricon Weekly Singles chart in January 2015, achieving sales figures of over 130,000 copies of their single Genkidane☆ (元気種☆, Source of Joy).

== Members and subgroups ==
The larger group of Kamen Joshi is an umbrella for the smaller groups Alice No. 10 (ja), Steam Girls (ja), Armor Girls (ja) and Easter Girls (ja). Three groups (Alice No. 10, Steam Girls and Armor Girls) regularly perform at their exclusive "Kamen Joshi Café" in Pasela, Akihabara. Easter Girls regularly perform at "KamenJoshi Theater" (sic) in Osaka. There are also songs by Kamen Joshi as a whole, with about 25 members from all groups performing together. These are mostly in the musical style of Alice No. 10 and are performed with all participants wearing Alice No. 10's masks.

At Kamen Joshi concerts, the setlists include both performances by Kamen Joshi as a whole as well as performances by the subgroups, freely mixed. These concerts are referred to as Kamenjoshi one man live (仮面女子ワンマンライブ). One man live is the usual term used in Japan for concerts of a single band, even if it consists of multiple members, as opposed to festivals with multiple artists.

The center position of Alice No. 10 and informal leader of the Kamen Joshi as a whole wears a red hockey mask, while all other members wear regular off-white ones.

=== Alice No. 10 (アリス十番) ===
The first of the Kamen Joshi groups to be formed is called Alice Jūban (アリス十番, Alice Number Ten), while the spelling Alice No. 10 with the same pronunciation is also used. The latter is also the spelling used on western services like iTunes. Foreign fans often refer to the group with a simplified romaji spelling of Alice Juban. The name refers to the Alice Project, the idol project within which Kamen Joshi originates. Alice No. 10's music often includes metal breakdowns and rap sections. All members wear Jason Voorhees-style hockey masks and wield a selection of prop weapons ranging from chainsaws to giant scissors.

- Mao Morishita (森下舞桜) ("Red Mask" position)
- Yūri Kinoshita (木下友里) (ja) (announced graduation)
- Seri Suzumura (涼邑芹) (ja)
- Saki Mitsuki (海月咲希) (announced graduation)
- Koharu Hinata (陽向こはる) (ja)
- Harumi Osuzu (大鈴はるみ) (announced graduation)

Former Alice No. 10 member Nanaka Kawamura (川村虹花) (ja) was also active as an atomweight Mixed Martial Arts fighter during her time in the group, displayed the Kamen Joshi logo on her shorts during fights. She retired from the sport on June 9, 2021, nearly 2 months after her graduation from Kamen Joshi.

=== Steam Girls (スチームガールズ) ===
Steam Girls was formed as Alice Jūban's official sister and rival group. Though their first song, "destiny", was a pop-rock number, since the release of "High and Low" in 2013, their music has come to incorporate more sounds from electronic and dance music. The members wear gas masks and leg warmers in a style combining elements from steampunk and cybergoth fashion. On stage, they carry distinctive prop guns (called "Laser Gun" and "Steam Gun") that fire laser beams and clouds of dry ice together. Unusual for the pop music industry, member Tomoka Igari is a wheelchair user. She participates in the choreographies normally, as far as her condition permits, performing the upper-body movements and position changes. Igari talking about her condition and presenting visual upgrades to her wheelchair are a regular part of Kamen Joshi solo concerts.

- Tomoka Igari (猪狩ともか)
- Yūka Kojima (小島夕佳)
- Yurie Hashimoto (橋本友梨英)
- Hina Ōno (大野柊奈)
- Rena Yamamiya (山宮れな)

=== Armor Girls (アーマーガールズ) ===
Armor Girls was formed after Alice No. 10 and Steam Girls had already released two singles as Kamen Joshi. Their masks resemble fantasy-themed plate armour helmets with visors, and they carry prop rifles called "Armor Gun". The group refers to its musical style as mori rokku (森ロック, forest rock), with the songs incorporating elements from Celtic folk music. Because of this, the group is sometimes referred to as Irish Idols (アイリッシュアイドル, airisshu aidoru) in promotional texts, but all members are Japanese.

- Moa Tsukino (月野もあ)
- Nonoa Aoi (蒼井乃々愛)
- Mitsuki Sena (瀬名深月) (ja) (announced graduation)
- Misaki Kitagawa (北川美咲)

=== Easter Girls (イースターガールズ) ===
Easter Girls is fourth group of Kamen Joshi, formed in Osaka. The group imagines an Easter festival. Easter Girls' songs incorporate sounds from Ska Rock.

On January 15, 2023, Easter Girls went on an indefinite hiatus. All members except Kirari Mitsuki (美月きらり) have left the agency.

Kirari Mitsuki (美月きらり) has been active as a member of Shinsekai Hero since March 25, 2023.

- Saria Sēra (星流さりあ) (ja)
- Hanon Nakamura (中村波音)
- Makoto Tachibana (橘真琴)
- Kokoro Seguchi (瀬口こころ)
- Narumi Akatsuki (暁成実)
- Kirari Mitsuki (美月きらり)

=== Slime Girls (スライムガールズ) ===
The group called Slime Girls is not an individual musical unit but rather a group of new entrees into Kamen Joshi not yet deemed capable enough to participate in the regular performances. They sometimes open for the regular group. The name likely refers to Slimes, the first monsters a player encounters in games like Dragon Quest and some versions of Final Fantasy and The Legend of Zelda. Slimes have therefore become a cultural icon in Japan representing low level or beginner tasks.

=== Former members ===
- Jun Amaki (graduated 2015)
- Erina Kamiya (graduated 2018)
- Nanaka Kawamura (graduated 2021)

== Discography ==
=== Singles ===
Release date	Title	Oricon Ranking
March 6, 2013	"Kamen Joshi"	13
December 11, 2013	"Mousou Nikki"	4
January 1, 2015	"Genkidane"	1
January 3, 2017	"Kamen Tairiku ~Personia~/ISUMI ~Shikisai no Machi de~"	2

=== Albums ===
Release date	Title	Oricon Ranking
June 2, 2021	"Mask a Raid"	11

=== DVDs ===
Release date	Title	Oricon Ranking
April 20, 2016	"Kamen Joshi One-Man Live Chikyu no Oheso in Saitama Super Arena"	13

== Donald Trump video ==
During the 2016 United States presidential election campaigning period, Kamen Joshi released a video voicing their support of Donald Trump, with a disclaimer stating that the video is only "entertainment", and "does not represent the political thoughts and beliefs of the members and their affiliated offices."
