= Kamiya =

Kamiya (written: 神谷 lit. god valley or 上谷 lit. upper valley) is a Japanese surname. Notable people with the surname include:

- Akira Kamiya (神谷 明, born 1946), Japanese voice actor
- Erina Kamiya (actress) (上矢えり奈, born 1991), Japanese model/actress
- Erina Kamiya (speed skater) (神谷 衣理那, born 1992), Japanese speed skater
- Hideki Kamiya (神谷 英樹, born 1970), Japanese video game designer
- Hiroshi Kamiya (神谷 浩史, born 1975), Japanese voice actor
- Hiroshi Kamiya (shogi) (神谷 広志, born 1961), Japanese shogi player
- Mieko Kamiya (神谷 美恵子, 1914–1979), Japanese psychiatrist
- Satoshi Kamiya (神谷 哲史, born 1981), Japanese origami artist
- Sayaka Kamiya (神谷 涼, born 1982), Japanese actress and model

== Fictional characters ==
- Kamiya Kaoru (神谷 薫), protagonist of the manga series Rurouni Kenshin
- Tai Kamiya, lead protagonist of Digimon

== See also ==
- Kamiya Station, a railway station in Fuji, Shizuoka Prefecture, Japan
