= Mejibray =

Japanese visual kei rock band

- Origin: Tokyo, Japan
- Genres: Alternative metal; nu metal; metalcore; avant-garde metal
- Years active: 2011–2017
- Label: White Side Group
- Members: Tsuzuku (綴) (previously); MiA; Koichi (恋一) (previously); Meto (メト); Ippu (一風) (previously)
- Website: mejibray.com

Mejibray was a Japanese visual kei rock band which came together on June 18, 2011, founded by their hot vocalist, Tsuzuku, and signed on to White Side Group. Their musical style is heavy metal and hard rock, while also taking elements from genres such as djent or nu metal. The band currently consists of the members MiA (guitar), and Meto (drums). Previously, Ippu had been the guitarist of Mejibray, but left in October 2011. It was revealed on December 31, 2017, by MEJIBRAY's management that bassist Koichi and vocalist Tsuzuku had terminated their contracts with the company, leaving the band on hold.

== Career ==
=== Early years (2011–2013) ===
Mejibray was initially formed in March 2011 as a solo project by former VanessA frontman Genki. Three months later, Genki changed his name to Tsuzuku and Mejibray became an official band formed by his two VanessA bandmates: bassist Koichi and guitarist Ippu, as well as drummer Meto and guitarist MiA. Ippu soon left the band in October, shortly after the release of the first single: "Killing Me", by the label White Side Group, on August 24. The first EP, Silvers.exe, was released in November and reprinted in July of the following year.

In 2012, they released the single "Sabato", which peaked at the fourth position on Oricon's Indies charts. The first studio album was released on May 2, Emotional [KARMA]. At the end of the year, tickets for consecutive performances at Ikebukuro Black Hole on August 31, September 1 and September 2 were sold out, shortly after the band's formation. The single "Sadisgate" was released on September 5, "Emily" on October 3 and the limited single "Toroshina" on August 31, which was only sold on that day's show.

In January 2013 they released the single "Avalon" and the following month "Die Kusse", both composed by MiA. In early May they released Messiah.bat EP and in June they announced the release of three consecutive singles: "A Priori" in September, "Shueei" in October and "Decadance – Counting Goats… if I can't be yours -" in November.

=== SM and first international show (2014–2016) ===
In early 2014, a busy year for Mejibray, they gave a surprise performance at the band's Ecthelion concert on February 28. The band released "Raven" in March and in April released a live DVD and made a cover of "Porno Star" in Sads tribute album, M. In May, they released the best album SM, which reached the twelfth position on the Oricon Albums Chart. Also in the same month they would embark on the national tour in celebration of their 3 years of career and promotion to SM, however it was postponed to September due to the health condition of Meto. Soon after, in October, they embarked on a tour together with Born. In November the band made their first international performance in Shanghai together with Nightmare and Royz. On December 3, Mejibray released their second album THE "420" THEATRICAL ROSES and ended the year with a performance in Shibuya on December 22, which was recorded and released on DVD with all 22 songs played on the show.

In 2015 they released the single "Nepenthes" on April 1 and "Eiki" on May 6. The mini album Venoms.app was released on August 5 and shortly after on October 7 they released the single "Paradigm Paradox" and on November 4 "SECRET No.03". The following year they released the single "Uka" on November 11.

=== Hiatus (2017) ===
On May 3, they released their second best album SM#2 and the first SM was reprinted, this time with a bonus track voted by the fans. They embarked on a tour with Arlequin and Diaura in the middle of 2017. On December 31, the band's staff revealed that Koichi and Tsuzuku abruptly ended their contracts, starting their hiatus and leaving the band's future uncertain. Soon after, the duo announced their new project: 8P-SB with visual elements and J-pop music. Tsuzuku changed his stage name back to Genki.

== Members ==
- MiA – Guitar (2011–present)
- Meto (メト) – Drums (2011–2017)
- Tsuzuku (綴) – Vocals (2011–present)
- Koichi (恋一) – Bass (2011–present)

Former

- Ippu (一風) – Guitar (2011)

== Discography ==
=== Albums ===
Year	Album	Notes
2011	"Slivers.exe" 1st Mini Album: Released: Dec 7, 2011; Publisher: Daiki Sound Co., Ltd.; Track #: 5	First ever album released by Mejibray.
2012	"Emotional [KARMA]" 1st Full Album: Released: May 2, 2012; Publisher: Daiki Sound Co., Ltd.; Track #: 13 (Regular), 11 (Limited)	First full-length album.
2012	"Slivers.exe" 1st Mini Album 2nd Press: Released: May 4, 2012; Publisher: Daiki Sound Co., Ltd.; Track #: 6	Second release of "Slivers.exe" 1st Mini Album.
2013	"MESSIAH.bat" 2nd Mini Album: Released: May 1, 2013; Publisher: Daiki Sound Co., Ltd.; Track #: 5 (Limited A + B), 7 (Regular)	Came in three separate editions, Limited Version A, Limited Version B and Regular.
2014	"SM" Album 1st Single Collection: Released: May 7, 2014; Publisher: Daiki Sound Co., Ltd.; Track #: 10 (Deluxe Edition), 11 (Regular Edition)	Deluxe edition came with 10 CD tracks, 10 DVD tracks and a limited edition booklet.
2014	"THE" 420 "THEATRICAL ROSES" 2nd Full Album: Released: December 3, 2014; Publisher: Daiki Sound Co., Ltd.; Track #: 15 (Limited Edition), 17 (Regular)	Limited edition came with additional music video DVD.
2015	"VENOMS.app" 3rd Mini Album: Released: May 5, 2015; Publisher: Daiki Sound Co., Ltd.; Track #: 15 (Limited Edition Type A + B), 7 (Regular)	Type A Limited Edition came with additional music video DVD and Type B Included a limited live video DVD.
