= Zoro (band) =

Japanese visual kei rock band

ZORO
- Origin: Mie Prefecture, Japan
- Genres: Indie rock; new wave; post-punk; funk rock
- Years active: 2007–2015
- Labels: Danger Crue Records (2007-2010); Jesse Records (2011-2015)
- Spinoff of: Soroban
- Past members: Ryuji (龍寺); Tatsuhi (たつひ); Taizo (タイゾ); Yuuya (裕哉)
- Website: www.zoro-web.com

Zoro (stylized as ZORO) was a Japanese visual kei rock band formed in January 2007. Though they were originally a four-piece band for four years, as of 2011, the band is a duo consisting of vocalist Ryuuji and bassist Tatsuhi.

== History ==
Vocalist Ryuuji, bassist Tatsuhi, and drummer Yuuya were previously part of a band called Soroban. After Soroban disbanded, the three went on to form the band Zoro in January 2007. Their first performance was at Liquidroom Ebisu on March 5, 2007, although they did not have a drummer. Taizo later joined Zoro in June 2007 after the disbandment of his previous band, Mouse.

On December 27, 2010, at Maverick DC Group's annual concert Jack in the Box 2010, Zoro revealed that Yuuya and Taizo would be leaving the band and that the band would go on a hiatus. Their last performance together was held at C.C.Lemon Hall on December 29, 2010. During the performance, vocalist Ryuuji declared to the audience that he and Tatsuhi would continue Zoro as a duo. The band later departed from Maverick DC Group's record label, Danger Crue Records.

In July 2011, the band announced that they would be resuming activities while still in search of a new guitarist and drummer. With their return, they launched a new independent record label, Jesse Records, and released a new single. They also embarked on a solo tour in the following months.

== Past members ==
- Ryuuji (龍寺) - vocalist (2007–2015)
- Tatsuhi (たつひ) - bassist (2007–2015)
- Yuuya (ゆうや) – drummer (2007–2010)
- Taizo (タイゾ) - guitarist (2007–2010), currently in Kra

== Discography ==
=== Full Albums ===
Album	Title	Tracks	Release date
1st	「COSMO」 -ステンレスミュージック-	1. Yellow Berry; 2. KITSUNE; 3. ロンド-N12- (Rondo-N12-); 4. プラトニックデカダンス (Platonic Decadence); 5. 脳にカルキ (Nou ni karuki); 6. ノイローゼディスコ (Neurosis Disco); 7. COSMO「S」フューチャー (COSMO「S」FUTURE); 8. RIOT; 9. パノラマHOP (Panorama HOP); 10. サイケ★タイガー (Psyche★Tiger); 11. 核・再び・連鎖 (Kaku・Futatabi・Rensa); 12. 雨ライフ (Ame Life)	August 20, 2008
2nd	CORE	1. Kung-fu dance<創>; 2. Digo; 3. 閃光 (Senkou); 4. ダンスーン (Dansuun); 5. NANA; 6. Water inside 7. Dizzy TRICK; 8. Spankingnoiz//100v.9MHz=DM?JURIAN.cot; 9. 肺音楽-Hightmusic-; 10. ビターオレンジ; 11. F・O・G; 12. KID	September 9, 2009
3rd	KIGA	1. 猿愛; 2. roulette 3. 青馬; 4. HOUSE・OF・MADPEAK KIGA ver.; 5. kuga-宗派右編-; 6. vega-教派左編-; 7. 連弾_pianoduet 8. トラッシュ; 9. GOLD CARD KIGA ver.; 10. style 11. green	December 1, 2010

=== Mini-Albums ===
Album	Title	Tracks	Release date
1st	APOLLO	1. VAIO; 2. ダンデ (Dande); 3. 東京セレクション (Tokyo Selection); 4. 1888; 5. FICTION; 6. Smith	August 29, 2007

=== Singles ===
Album	Title	Tracks	Release date
1st	"ロストテクノロジー"	1. ナッツ・Night・スター; 2. ライオンベイビイ; 3. 楽園; 4. CUBE	March 5, 2008
2nd	"Playear"	1. PINK; 2. warp 3. ハラ■■ show time	March 18, 2009
3rd	"NISHIKI"	1. DYNAMITE FLAVOR; 2. レイテンシー・スノウ; 3. timeland	May 27, 2009
4th	"GOLD CARD"	1. GOLD CARD; 2. FIGHTER FIGHTER; 3. アサシン; 4. GAGA	March 3, 2010
5th	"HOUSE・OF・MADPEAK"	1. HOUSE・OF・MADPEAK; 2. Mitsukedasu Asa; 3. CAPSULE [addiction]	August 11, 2010
6th	"POLICE"	1. POLICE; 2. more 3. 109	September 21, 2011
7th	"薔薇肉"	1. 薔薇肉; 2. 百合束-葬式-; 3. 下克上ストリップ	February 29, 2012
8th	"HOWL"	1. HOWL; 2. BEAST; 3. その後。	July 25, 2012
9th	"NightRider"	1. NightRider; 2. UNDER; 3. DADA; 4. NightRider (REMIX)	January 23, 2013
10th	"PEST"	1. PEST; 2. 零戦	March 23, 2013
11th	"Mousou Nikki"	1. 妄想日記; 2. 蝿 3. ペスト	December 11, 2013

=== Promotional videos ===
Title	Release date	Label
PINK	March 18, 2009	Danger Crue Records
Dynamite Flavor	May 27, 2009	Danger Crue Records
Latency Snow (レイテンシー・スノウ)	May 27, 2009	Danger Crue Records
Timeland	May 27, 2009	Danger Crue Records
Senkou (閃光)	September 9, 2009	Danger Crue Records
HOUSE・OF・MADPEAK	August 11, 2010	Danger Crue Records
POLICE	September 21, 2011	Jesse Records
HOWL	July 25, 2012	Jesse Records
