= Denpa =

Denpa may refer to:

- Denpa (music), a type of Japanese music
- Denpa (company), an American publishing company
- Denpa (satellite), a Japanese scientific research satellite whose launch failed
- Denpa, a Japanese term describing individuals who exhibit unusual or incoherent behaviour in manga and anime
