= Tomoka Igari =

Japanese idol

- 猪狩 ともか
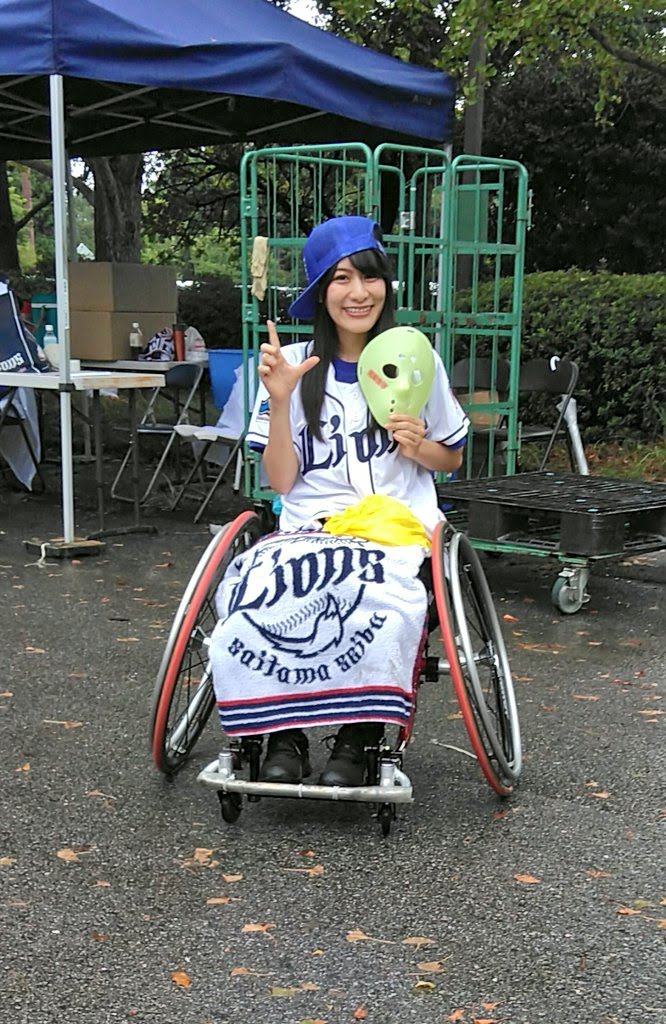
- Igari in 2018
- Born: December 9, 1991 (age 34); Saitama Prefecture, Japan
- Occupation: Singer
- Years active: 2014 - present
- Agent: Alice Project
- Musical career
- Genres: J-pop
- Instrument: Vocals
- Member of: Kamen Joshi

Tomoka Igari (猪狩 ともか, Igari Tomoka) is a Japanese singer who is a member of the idol group Kamen Joshi since 2014.

She is mostly known for being the first idol to perform on a wheelchair due to a case of paraplegia (caused by spinal cord injury) that started on April 11, 2018.
