= GaGaalinG =

"Japanese Music" "Visual Kei"

- Origin: Japan
- Genres: Gothic rock, pop rock
- Years active: 2004-2010
- Labels: Zetima (2005-2006), Gothuall (2007-2010)
- Past members: MYM; MOTO; Jun Takai; Koyanagi "Cherry" Masanori

GaGaalingG was a Japanese visual kei gothic rock band formed in 2005 and ended in 2010.

== History ==
GaGaalinG was formed in 2005 by vocalist MYM (formerly known as MAIMING) after going to a Rolling Stones concert in 2005 she was so overwhelmed by the band that she decided to form a band herself.

On February 6, 2008 GaGaalinG released their fourth single "Pierce", later that month GaGaalinG announced a new full-length album, Royal Stranger, released on 26 March and a tour at the MEGURO ROKUMEIKAN that started on 1 March and ended on 13 April.

On 5 November GaGaalinG released their mini-album, "Alice".

On 2 March 2010, GaGaalinG announced on their Myspace that they would be disbanding on 17 July. They held their last live on 17 July 2010, and disbanded later that day.

On 17 October 2015, the band performed a reunion show at the 30th year anniversary event of Koyanagi "Cherry" Masanori's debut.

== Musical Style ==
Gagaaling described themselves as gothic loud rock band. Their songs have also been described as heavy rock and pop. Their songs also incorporate elements of Christianity.

== Name ==
The band's name comes from Yuri Gagarin who was the first person to go to space.

== Members ==
Members

- MYM - Vocals (2005-2010)
- MOTO G-3 - Guitar - (2005-2010)
- Jun Takai - Bass (2007-2010)
- Koyanagi "Cherry" Masanori - Drums (2005-2010)

== Discography ==
Albums

- ROYAL PUNX (2005)
- ROYAL BLOOD (2006)
- Royal Stranger (2008)

Mini Album

- Haruyurara (2006)
- ALICE (2008)

Singles

- Ai no Chikara - born to be loved (2006)
- i-Scream Machine (2007)
- Pierce (2008)
