= Erina Kamiya (actress) =

Japanese model and YouTuber (born 1991)

- 上矢えり奈
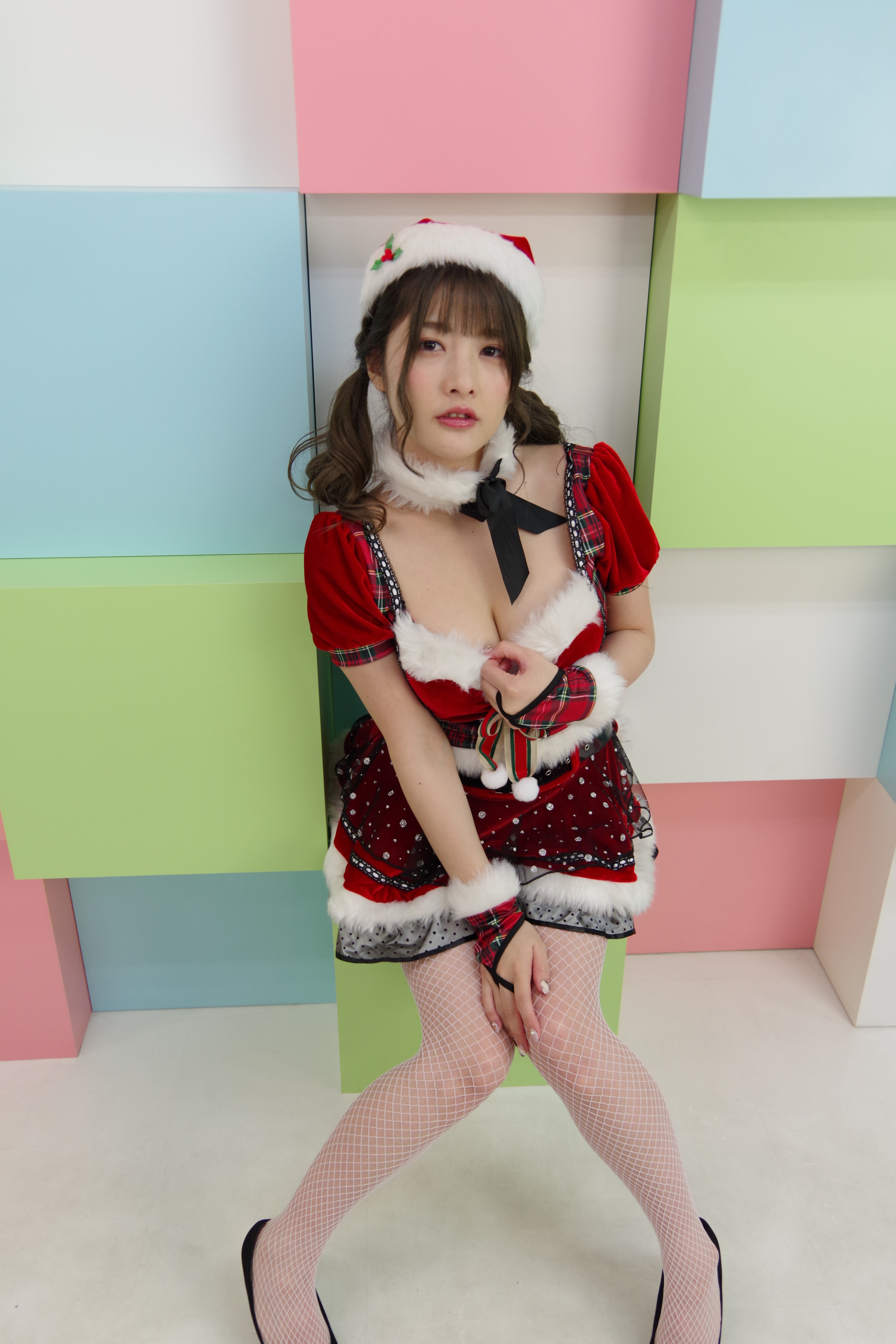
- Erina Kamiya in Tokyo, 2019
- Born: October 15, 1991 (age 34)
- Other names: 神谷えりな
- Occupations: Actress; model; YouTuber
- Known for: Kamen Joshi

Erina Kamiya (上矢えり奈, Kamiya Erina; born October 15, 1991 in Iwata, Shizuoka Prefecture) is a Japanese musical performer, actress, model, and YouTuber.

== Career ==
=== Music ===
Kamiya began performing as a Japanese idol at the age of 19, and in 2012, at the age of 20, she moved to Tokyo from Iwata City, Shizuoka Prefecture. Kamiya joined Kamen Joshi as a trainee as part of Oz in June 2012 and debuted as an original member of Steam Girls in October. In April 2013, she transferred to the group's Cherry Blossom unit, and moved to the group's primary unit Alice Juban in January 2018.

As a member of Kamen Joshi, she performed ten live concerts a week in Akihabara, in addition to rehearsals, dance and vocal training, and photo and video shoots.

On November 30, 2018, Kamiya performed her final live show as a member of Kamen Joshi.

=== Acting ===
In 2016,Kamiya performed in a selection of "Alice Films" shorts produced by Kamen Joshi. In 2017, Kamiya made her feature film debut in Umi ni nose ta Gazu no yume ("Gaz’s Dreams on the Sea")

Kamiya starred in the SBS television series Cho Do S Night no Yoru (2017) and its sequel program Do S Night no Ran: Yappari TV Kankeisha wa Minaide Kudasai (2019).

In 2019, Kamiya starred in the horror film Erimaki Onna - Dark Assassin.

=== YouTube ===
In October 2017, Kamiya launched her solo YouTube channel, which debuted with over 47,000 subscribers and over 3.7 million views, the second highest number for that week among Japanese entertainers. She revealed that her first month's revenue from YouTube views was 477,426 yen (US$4,200).

Kamiya's YouTube channel featured the performer doing stunts such as and breaking tiles with her breasts and diving into cola covered in Mentos. Her parody of Akira 100%, a Japanese comedian who would be nude on stage but would cover himself with objects, received over 18 million views.

=== Modeling ===
Kamiya released a series of gravure DVDs and Blu-rays, including Erinyanpuru (2015), followed by Amagami-sama (2016), and Otona na Erina (2018).

In 2017, Kamiya released her first solo photobook, Kamichichi.

In 2018, she announced her retirement from modeling.

== Personal life ==
=== Motorcycle riding ===
Kamiya is a noted motorcycle enthusiast who has appeared in bike magazines such as Zokeisha and collaborated in promotion campaigns with Japanese manufacturer Suzuki.

=== Death threats ===
As a child, Kamiya was diagnosed with strabismus, which caused her to become insecure as a performer, and developed symptom including double vision, dizziness and headaches. She underwent surgery for the condition in 2015.

In 2017, Kamiya was the target of death threats posted to social media. The threats were attributed to an anonymous party who used VPN technology to mask their identity and location. An investigation into the threats was launched by the Tokyo Metropolitan Police Department.

=== Name change ===
In 2019, Kamiya changed the Japanese characters of her name from "神谷えりな " to "上矢えり奈", with the same pronunciation. She explained the change as being connected to having her fortune read as the number of strokes in her former name as being unlucky and wanting to make a fresh start in entertainment.

== Filmography ==
=== TV series ===
Year	Title	Role	Network	Notes	Ref.
2017	Cho Do S Night no Yoru		SBS	Lead role	
2019	Do S Night no Ran: Yappari TV Kankeisha wa Minaide Kudasai		SBS	Lead role	

=== Film ===
Year	Title	Role	Notes	Ref.
2017	Umi ni nose ta Gazu no yume ("Gaz’s Dreams on the Sea")	Miyauchi Mahiro	Lead role	
2019	Erimaki Onna - Dark Assassin	Kasumi Saotome	Lead role	

=== Gravure ===
Release date	Title	Format	Product number	Studio
2015
September 18	Erinyan Biyori (Erinyan Weather)	DVD	TSDS-42105	Takeshobo
September 18	Erinyan Biyori (Erinyan Weather)	Blu-ray	TSBS-81027	Takeshobo
December 15	Erinyanpuru	DVD	LCDV-40722	Line Communications
December 15	Erinyanpuru	Blu-ray	LCBD-00722	Line Communications
2016
May 20	I♡Erinyan	DVD	ENFD-5720	E-Net Frontier
September 30	Amagami-sama (Sweet God)	DVD	SBVD-0339	S Digital
September 30	Amagami-sama (Sweet God)	Blu-ray	SBVB-0035	S Digital
2017
August 25	Ningen Toki (Human Pottery)	DVD	OME-278	Air Control
2018
April 20	Otona na Erina (Adult Erina)	DVD	LCDV-40837	Line Communications
April 20	Otona na Erina (Adult Erina)	Blu-ray	LCBD-00837	Line Communications
