= Royz =

Japanese visual kei rock band

- Origin: Osaka, Japan
- Genres: Rock
- Years active: 2009–present
- Label: B.P Records
- Members: Subaru; Kuina; Koudai; Tomoya
- Past members: Kazuki
- Website: https://royz-web.net/

Royz is a Japanese visual kei rock band formed in 2009 in Osaka. Currently, Subaru is on vocals, Kuina is on guitar, Koudai is on bass and Tomoya is on drums and they are on the label B.P Records.

== History ==
Royz started their activities in Osaka, on September 28, 2009. They started with four members, and then guitarist Kuina joined the band in 2010 and the band moved to Tokyo and joined BP Records.

Kazuki left the band in 2014 after a performance at Akasaka Blitz, due to family problems.

With the bands Kiryu and Codomo Dragon, Royz released the single "Family Party" and the video for "Ryōran Resonance" (繚乱レゾナンス).

In November 2016, Koudai announced that he would pause activities in the band to treat his spondylosis. He returned in December of the same year.

Royz released the single "Ignite" on May 20, 2019, in four different versions. On March 18, 2020, the band released their 19th single, "Daydream".

== Members ==
- Subaru (昴) – vocals
- Kuina (杙凪) – guitar
- Koudai (公大) – bass guitar
- Tomoya (智也) – drums

=== Past members ===
- Kazuki – guitar

== Discography ==
=== Albums ===
Title	Release	Oricon chart
Revolution to New Age	November 30, 2011	32
Tears	February 27, 2013	22
Core	July 2, 2014	17
S.I.V.A	April 6, 2016	10
World Is Mine	March 21, 2018	16
Royz: The Best 2009–2019	April 3, 2019	34
Lync	July 6, 2022	24
Royz: The Best 2019–2024	October 30, 2024	43
