= Rock and Read =

Japanese music magazine

- Editor: Koji Yoshida
- Categories: Music
- Frequency: Bimonthly
- Publisher: Shinko Music Entertainment
- First issue: 2004
- Country: Japan
- Language: Japanese

Rock and Read (stylized as ROCK AND READ, abbreviated to RR) is a Japanese music magazine, of Mook format, published bimonthly since 2004. Its publisher is Shinko Music Entertainment and its editor is Koji Yoshida, representing Axel Communications. It features long interviews with musicians mainly from the visual kei scene.

In 2004, the music magazine Band Yarouze ceased publication. Koji Yoshida, who had been editing it, launched Rock and Read in the same year, initially called Real Read and published independently. Previously, he had published a magazine called Read in 2003 as a separate version of Band Yarouze.

Yoshida aimed to create a magazine with the opposite concept: instead of several "disorganized" photographs, he wanted to create it in book format with long and in-depth interviews with artists exclusively from visual kei scene. He also said that he looks for interviewees who "have had recent events or incidents", and not because they "have released a new record".

In 2012, the first separate edition of Rock and Read was released, named Rock and Read eyes. It was created to have the opposite concept of RR, featuring more photos than text. Two years later, Idol and Read edition started publication, featuring Japanese idols.

In July 2017, the Rock and Read Band edition was created, focused on interviewing bands as a whole. In November, an edition of the magazine starring vocalists was launched, called Rock and Read Vocal.

In 2019, Rock and Read Girls featuring female artists was created. An edition with interviews with comedians, Owarai and Read, began serialization in 2021.

Issue no. 39 featured a collaboration between Hitsugi (Nightmare) and designer and musician Tatsuya Ishii. Issue no. 100 had Kirito on the cover, as he was on the cover of the magazine's early edition, Read.
