= BugLug =

Japanese visual kei rock band

- Origin: Japan
- Genres: Pop Punk,pop rock,electronic rock, avant-punk,
- Years active: 2009–present
- Label: Resistar Records
- Members: Issei; Kazuki; Yu; Tsubame; Yusuke
- Past members: Masaumi

BugLug is a Japanese visual kei rock band formed in 2009.

== History ==
BugLug formed in 2009, when their official site teased a shadowed image of the members, a teaser of the song "-7-", their first EP release date and a countdown for December 19. In that day, the band was revealed, consisting of vocalist Issei, guitarists Kazuki and Yu, and bassist Tsubame and they signed to Resistar Records.

On January 27, 2010 BugLug released their first mini-album "SUPER NOVA". The buyers could attend the band's first oneman show for free on March 6. On August 6, 2010 they released their second single "Made in Mine." which won first place on the Oricon Indie Single Ranking.

In 2011 Masaumi, former member of Juliet joined the band as the drummer.

In March 2013, the band released three singles "Live to Love", "BUKIMI" and "R.I.P", and in May they released their single "Civilization Kaika".

On May 7, 2016, Vocalist Issei was hospitalized for after suffering severe head injuries after falling down a flight of stairs at a restaurant in Shibuya, Tokyo causing the band to postpone all later tours. Issei made a full recovery and was discharged from the hospital in July.

In 2019 BugLug announced that drummer Masaumi would be leaving the band.

In 2020 the band announced that Yusuke would become the drummer. On May 3, 2023 BugLug released their album "i CON"

== Musical Style ==
Their music has described as "a new style of mixed rock". Vocalist Issei's sweet voice and colorful performance has been described as "fresh and full of pop". Their name is a combination of the words "Bug" and "Luxury, which means "I want to do something flashy and fun".

== Members ==
- Issei - Vocals (2009–present)
- Kazuki - Guitar (2009–present)
- Yu - Guitar (2009–present)
- Tsubame - Bass (2009–present)
- Yusuke - Drums (2020–present)

Former

- Masaumi - Drums (2011–2019)

== Discography ==
Albums

- G.A.G (August 8, 2012), Oricon chart peak position: 48
- Happy Birthday Kill You (April 1, 2015), 17
- KAI・TAI・SHIN・SHO (May 1, 2018), 17
- Futomei na Sugao (不透明な素顔; August 6, 2019)
- Rock Band Is Not Dead (November 24, 2020)
- i CON (May 3, 2023)
- Namairo. (なまいろ。; December 10, 2025)

Mini Albums

- SUPER NOVA (January 27, 2010)

Singles

- "ASOBIZ' (April 7, 2010)
- "Made in Mind (August 8, 2010)
- "Zekkou Etsuraku Ron" (April 13, 2011)
- "Kaibutstu (July 20, 2011)
- "SHOW 2 GLOW" (December 7, 2011)
- "GUILLOTINE" (February 2, 2012)
- "KILLERxKILLERxKILLER" (July 4, 2012)
- "R.I.P" (March 20, 2013)
- "BUKIMI" (March 20, 2013)
- "Live to Love" (March 20, 2013)
- "骨 (Hone)" (March 10, 2014)
