= List of songs recorded by Buck-Tick =

This is a comprehensive list of songs recorded by Japanese rock band Buck-Tick. Since the band formed in 1983, it has released twenty-four studio albums.

== Table ==
Key
†	Indicates single release

List of songs by Buck-Tick, with songwriters, associated releases, and year (344 entries)
Title	Year	Album / Single	Lyrics	Music	Notes
"...In Heaven..."	1988	Seventh Heaven	Atsushi Sakurai	Hisashi Imai	Re-recorded for the Koroshi no Shirabe: This Is Not Greatest Hits album in 1992
"13byou"	2005	Juusankai wa Gekkou	-	Hisashi Imai	Blank track (13 seconds of silence)
"21st Cherry Boy" †	2001	Kyokutou I Love You	Sakurai/Imai	Hisashi Imai	
"Ai no Harem"	2023	Izora	Atsushi Sakurai	Hidehiko Hoshino	
"Ai no Souretsu"	2016	Atom Miraiha No.9	Atsushi Sakurai	Hisashi Imai	
"Ai no Uta"	2003	Mona Lisa Overdrive	Atsushi Sakurai	Hisashi Imai	
"Aikawarazu no "Are" no Katamari ga Nosabaru Hedo no Soko no Fukidamari"	1995	Six/Nine	Hisashi Imai	Hisashi Imai	
"Aku no Hana" †	1990	Aku no Hana	Atsushi Sakurai	Hisashi Imai	Re-recorded for the Koroshi no Shirabe: This Is Not Greatest Hits album in 1992
"Alice in Wonder Underground" †	2007	Tenshi no Revolver	Hisashi Imai	Hisashi Imai	
"Alive"	2005	Juusankai wa Gekkou	Atsushi Sakurai	Hisashi Imai	
"Angelfish"	1991	Kurutta Taiyou	Atsushi Sakurai	Hidehiko Hoshino	
"Angelic Conversation"	1989	Taboo	Hisashi Imai	Hisashi Imai	Re-recorded as the B-side of "M・A・D" in 1991
"Ao no Sekai"	1993	Darker Than Darkness: Style 93	Atsushi Sakurai	Hisashi Imai	
"April Fools wa Tengoku no Gate"	2026	"Sonzai Riyuu Kai"	Hisashi Imai	Hisashi Imai	Single B-side
"Ash-ra"	1996	Cosmos	Atsushi Sakurai	Hisashi Imai	
"Asylum Garden"	1999	"Bran-New Lover"	Atsushi Sakurai	Hidehiko Hoshino	Single B-side
"Automatic Blue"	1988	Romanesque	Hisashi Imai	Hisashi Imai	
"Babel" †	2017	No.0	Atsushi Sakurai	Hisashi Imai	
"Baby, I Want You."	2000	One Life, One Death	Atsushi Sakurai	Hisashi Imai	
"Barairo Juujidan -Rosen Kreuzer-"	2018	No.0	Atsushi Sakurai	Hidehiko Hoshino	
"Barairo no Hibi"	2001	"21st Cherry Boy"	Atsushi Sakurai	Hidehiko Hoshino	Single B-side
"Baudelaire de Nemurenai"	2014	Arui wa Anarchy	Hisashi Imai	Hisashi Imai	
"Beast"	2007	Tenshi no Revolver	Atsushi Sakurai	Hisashi Imai	
"Bi Neo Universe"	2016	Atom Miraiha No.9	Atsushi Sakurai	Hisashi Imai	
"Bishuu Love"	2018	No.0	Atsushi Sakurai	Hisashi Imai	
"Black Cherry"	2003	Mona Lisa Overdrive	Sakurai/Hoshino	Hidehiko Hoshino	
"Bolero"	2010	Razzle Dazzle	Hisashi Imai	Hisashi Imai	
"Boogie Woogie"	2023	Izora	Atsushi Sakurai	Hisashi Imai	
"Boukyaku"	2020	Abracadabra	Atsushi Sakurai	Hisashi Imai	
"Boy Septem Peccata Mortalia"	2016	Atom Miraiha No.9	Atsushi Sakurai	Hisashi Imai	
"Brain, Whisper, Head, Hate Is Noise"	1991	Kurutta Taiyou	Hisashi Imai	Hisashi Imai	
"Bran-New Lover" †	1999	Non-album single	Atsushi Sakurai	Hisashi Imai	
"Brilliant"	2002	Kyokutou I Love You	Atsushi Sakurai	Hidehiko Hoshino	
"Buster"	2003	Mona Lisa Overdrive	Hisashi Imai	Hisashi Imai	
"Cabaret"	2005	Juusankai wa Gekkou	Atsushi Sakurai	Hidehiko Hoshino	
"Cain"	2000	One Life, One Death	Atsushi Sakurai	Hisashi Imai	
"Calm and Resonance"	2004	Akuma to Freud -Devil and Freud- Climax Together	Instrumental	Hisashi Imai	
"Campanella Hanataba o Kimi ni"	2023	Izora	Atsushi Sakurai	Hisashi Imai	
"Candy" †	1996	Cosmos	Atsushi Sakurai	Hisashi Imai	
"Capsule Tears -Plastic Syndrome III-"	1988	Seventh Heaven	Hisashi Imai	Hisashi Imai	
"Castle in the Air"	1988	Seventh Heaven	Hisashi Imai	Hisashi Imai	
"Check Up"	2000	One Life, One Death	Hisashi Imai	Hisashi Imai	
"Chikashitsu no Melody"	1991	Kurutta Taiyou	Hisashi Imai	Hisashi Imai	
"Chocolate"	1996	Cosmos	Atsushi Sakurai	Hidehiko Hoshino	
"Chouchou"	1997	Sexy Stream Liner	Atsushi Sakurai	Hidehiko Hoshino	
"Climax Together"	2012	Yume Miru Uchuu	Hisashi Imai	Hisashi Imai	
"Clown Loves Señorita"	2005	Juusankai wa Gekkou	Instrumental	Hisashi Imai	
"Continue"	2002	Kyokutou I Love You	Instrumental	Hisashi Imai	
"Continuous"	2003	Mona Lisa Overdrive	Instrumental	Hisashi Imai	
"Cosmos"	1996	Cosmos	Atsushi Sakurai	Hisashi Imai	
"Coyote"	2009	Memento Mori	Atsushi Sakurai	Hisashi Imai	
"Cream Soda"	2007	Tenshi no Revolver	Atsushi Sakurai	Hidehiko Hoshino	
"Cuba Libre"	2016	Atom Miraiha No.9	Atsushi Sakurai	Hisashi Imai	
"Cum uh Sol nu -Flask no Besshu-"	2016	Atom Miraiha No.9	Hisashi Imai	Hisashi Imai	
"Cyborg Dolly: Sora-mimi: Phantom"	2000	One Life, One Death	Hisashi Imai	Hisashi Imai	
"Dada Disco -GJTHBKHTD-"	2014	Arui wa Anarchy	Hisashi Imai	Hisashi Imai	
"Dance Tengoku"	2020	Abracadabra	Atsushi Sakurai	Hidehiko Hoshino	
"Datenshi" †	2020	Abracadabra	Atsushi Sakurai	Hisashi Imai	
"Death Wish"	2000	One Life, One Death	Atsushi Sakurai	Hidehiko Hoshino	
"Deep Slow"	1993	Darker Than Darkness: Style 93	Atsushi Sakurai	Hisashi Imai	
"Desperate Girl"	1988	Seventh Heaven	Atsushi Sakurai	Hidehiko Hoshino	
"Detarame Yarou"	1995	Six/Nine	Atsushi Sakurai	Imai/Sakurai	
"Devil'N Angel"	2014	Arui wa Anarchy	Hisashi Imai	Hisashi Imai	
"Devil's Wings"	2016	Atom Miraiha No.9	Atsushi Sakurai	Hisashi Imai	
"Diabolo"	2005	Juusankai wa Gekkou	Atsushi Sakurai	Hisashi Imai	
"Die" †	1993	Darker Than Darkness: Style 93	Atsushi Sakurai	Hisashi Imai	
"Dizzy Moon"	1990	Aku no Hana	Toll Yagami	Hidehiko Hoshino	
"Django -Genwaku no Django-"	2010	Razzle Dazzle	Hisashi Imai	Hisashi Imai	
"Do the I Love You"	1987	Sexual XXXXX!	Hisashi Imai	Hisashi Imai	Re-recorded for the Koroshi no Shirabe: This Is Not Greatest Hits album in 1992
"Dokudanjou Beauty" †	2010	Razzle Dazzle	Hisashi Imai	Hisashi Imai	
"Doll"	2005	Juusankai wa Gekkou	Atsushi Sakurai	Hisashi Imai	
"Doubt '99"	1999	Tribute Spirits	hide	hide	
"Doukeshi A"	2005	Juusankai wa Gekkou	Atsushi Sakurai	Hisashi Imai	
"Down"	1999	"Bran-New Lover"	Atsushi Sakurai	Hisashi Imai	Single B-side
"Dream or Truth"	1987	Sexual XXXXX!	Hisashi Imai	Hisashi Imai	
"Dress" †	1993	Darker Than Darkness: Style 93	Atsushi Sakurai	Hidehiko Hoshino	Remixed and used as the opening theme of Trinity Blood in 2005
"D.T.D"	1993	Darker Than Darkness: Style 93	Atsushi Sakurai	Hisashi Imai	Hidden track
"El Dorado"	2016	Atom Miraiha No.9	Atsushi Sakurai	Hidehiko Hoshino	
"Elise no Tame ni" †	2012	Yume Miru Uchuu	Hisashi Imai	Hisashi Imai	
"Embryo"	1989	Taboo	Atsushi Sakurai	Hisashi Imai	
"Empty Girl"	1987	Sexual XXXXX!	Hisashi Imai	Hisashi Imai	
"Enter Clown"	2005	Juusankai wa Gekkou	Instrumental	Hisashi Imai	
"Eureka"	2020	Abracadabra	Sakurai/Imai	Hisashi Imai	
"Feast of Demoralization"	1989	Taboo	Toll Yagami	Hidehiko Hoshino	
"Flame"	2000	One Life, One Death	Atsushi Sakurai	Hisashi Imai	
"Fly High"	1987	Hurry Up Mode	Hisashi Imai	Hisashi Imai	
"Foolish"	1996	Cosmos	Atsushi Sakurai	Hisashi Imai	
"For Dangerous Kids"	1987	Hurry Up Mode	Hisashi Imai	Hisashi Imai	
"Fragile Article"	1988	Seventh Heaven	Instrumental	Hisashi Imai	
"Freedom Freedom Paradise Lost" †	2025	Non-album single	Hisashi Imai	Hidehiko Hoshino	
"From Now On"	2024	Subrosa	Hidehiko Hoshino	Hidehiko Hoshino	
"Future for Future"	1987	Sexual XXXXX!	Hisashi Imai	Hisashi Imai	
"Future Song -Mirai ga Tooru-"	2016	Atom Miraiha No.9	Sakurai/Imai	Hisashi Imai	
"Gabriel no Rappa"	2024	Subrosa	Hisashi Imai	Hisashi Imai	
"Galaxy" †	2009	Memento Mori	Atsushi Sakurai	Hisashi Imai	
"Gekka Reijin"	2010	Razzle Dazzle	Atsushi Sakurai	Hisashi Imai	
"Gensou no Hana" †	2003	Non-album single	Atsushi Sakurai	Hidehiko Hoshino	
"Genzai"	2003	Mona Lisa Overdrive	Atsushi Sakurai	Hisashi Imai	
"Gessekai" †	1998	Non-album single	Atsushi Sakurai	Hisashi Imai	
"Gesshoku"	2005	Juusankai wa Gekkou	Atsushi Sakurai	Hisashi Imai	
"Ghost"	2002	Kyokutou I Love You	Atsushi Sakurai	Hisashi Imai	
"Girl"	2003	Mona Lisa Overdrive	Hisashi Imai	Hisashi Imai	
"Glamorous" †	2000	One Life, One Death	Atsushi Sakurai	Hisashi Imai	
"Goblin"	2005	Juusankai wa Gekkou	Atsushi Sakurai	Hisashi Imai	
"Go-Go B-T Train" †	2021	Non-album single	Atsushi Sakurai	Hisashi Imai	
"Guernica no Yoru"	2018	No.0	Atsushi Sakurai	Hisashi Imai	
"Gustave"	2018	No.0	Atsushi Sakurai	Hisashi Imai	
"Hameln"	2008	Sirius -Tribute to Ueda Gen-	Gen Ueda	Gen Ueda	
"Hamushi no You ni"	2010	Razzle Dazzle	Hisashi Imai	Hisashi Imai	
"Hearts"	1988	Romanesque	Atsushi Sakurai	Hisashi Imai	
"Heaven" †	2008	Memento Mori	Atsushi Sakurai	Hisashi Imai	
"Henshin (Reborn)"	1991	Kurutta Taiyou	Atsushi Sakurai	Hidehiko Hoshino	
"Heroin" †	1997	Sexy Stream Liner	Atsushi Sakurai	Hisashi Imai	
"Hikari no Teikoku"	2018	No.0	Hisashi Imai	Hisashi Imai	
"Hizumi"	2023	Izora	Atsushi Sakurai	Hisashi Imai	
"Hosoi Sen"	1995	Six/Nine	Atsushi Sakurai	Hidehiko Hoshino	
"Hurry Up Mode"	1987	Hurry Up Mode	Hisashi Imai	Hisashi Imai	
"Hyakumannayuta no Chiri Scum"	2024	Subrosa	Hisashi Imai	Hisashi Imai	
"Hyper Love"	1987	Sexual XXXXX!	Hisashi Imai	Hisashi Imai	Re-recorded for the Koroshi no Shirabe: This Is Not Greatest Hits album in 1992
"Iconoclasm"	1989	Taboo	Hisashi Imai	Hisashi Imai	Re-recorded for the Koroshi no Shirabe: This Is Not Greatest Hits album in 1992
"Idol"	1996	Cosmos	Atsushi Sakurai	Hisashi Imai	
"Igniter"	2018	No.0	Hisashi Imai	Hisashi Imai	
"Ijin no Yoru"	2005	Juusankai wa Gekkou	Atsushi Sakurai	Hidehiko Hoshino	
"Illusion"	1987	Sexual XXXXX!	Atsushi Sakurai	Hisashi Imai	
"In"	1996	Cosmos	Atsushi Sakurai	Hidehiko Hoshino	
"Inter Raptor"	2012	Yume Miru Uchuu	Atsushi Sakurai	Hisashi Imai	
"Itoshi no Rock Star"	1995	Six/Nine	Atsushi Sakurai	Hidehiko Hoshino	
"J"	1989	Taboo	Hisashi Imai	Hisashi Imai	
"Jonathan Jet-Coaster"	2009	Memento Mori	Atsushi Sakurai	Hisashi Imai	
"Jukai"	2016	Atom Miraiha No.9	Atsushi Sakurai	Hidehiko Hoshino	
"Jupiter" †	1991	Kurutta Taiyou	Atsushi Sakurai	Hidehiko Hoshino	Re-recorded for the Koroshi no Shirabe: This Is Not Greatest Hits album in 1992
"Just One More Kiss" †	1988	Taboo	Atsushi Sakurai	Hisashi Imai	Re-recorded for the Koroshi no Shirabe: This Is Not Greatest Hits album in 1992 and again as the B-side of "Go-Go B-T Train" in 2021
"Kagerou" †	2006	Non-album single	Atsushi Sakurai	Hisashi Imai	
"Kagirinaku Nezumi"	1995	Six/Nine	Atsushi Sakurai	Hisashi Imai	
"Kalavinka"	1997	Sexy Stream Liner	Atsushi Sakurai	Hisashi Imai	
"Kamikaze"	1993	Darker Than Darkness: Style 93	Hisashi Imai	Hisashi Imai	
"Katte ni Shiyagare"	2009	Memento Mori	Atsushi Sakurai	Hidehiko Hoshino	
"Kaze no Prologue"	2025	"Shibuya Hurry Upper!"	Hidehiko Hoshino	Hidehiko Hoshino	Single B-side
"Keijijou Ryuusei" †	2014	Arui wa Anarchy	Atsushi Sakurai	Hisashi Imai	
"Kemonotachi no Yoru" †	2019	Abracadabra	Atsushi Sakurai	Hisashi Imai	
"Kick (Daichi wo Keru Otoko)"	1995	Six/Nine	Atsushi Sakurai	Hisashi Imai	
"Kimi e"	1995	"Uta"	Atsushi Sakurai	Hidehiko Hoshino	Single B-side
"Kimi ga Shin...Dara"	1997	Sexy Stream Liner	Atsushi Sakurai	Hisashi Imai	
"Kimi no Vanilla"	1995	Six/Nine	Atsushi Sakurai	Hisashi Imai	
"Kinjirareta Asobi -Adult Children-"	2012	Yume Miru Uchuu	Atsushi Sakurai	Hisashi Imai	
"Kirameki no Naka de..."	1993	Darker Than Darkness: Style 93	Atsushi Sakurai	Hisashi Imai	
"Kiss Me Good-Bye"	1990	Aku no Hana	Atsushi Sakurai	Hisashi Imai	
"Kodou" †	1995	Six/Nine	Atsushi Sakurai	Hisashi Imai	
"Kogoeru"	2020	Abracadabra	Atsushi Sakurai	Hidehiko Hoshino	
"Koi"	2021	"Go-Go B-T Train"	Atsushi Sakurai	Hidehiko Hoshino	Single B-side
"Kourin"	2005	Juusankai wa Gekkou	Atsushi Sakurai	Hisashi Imai	
"Kuchizuke" †	2010	Razzle Dazzle	Atsushi Sakurai	Hisashi Imai	
"Kurage"	2024	Subrosa	Instrumental	Hisashi Imai	
"Kyokutou Yori Ai wo Komete" †	2002	Kyokutou I Love You	Atsushi Sakurai	Hisashi Imai	
"Kyouki no Dead Heat"	2010	Razzle Dazzle	Atsushi Sakurai	Hidehiko Hoshino	
"La Vie en Rose"	2007	Tenshi no Revolver	Atsushi Sakurai	Hidehiko Hoshino	
"Lady Skeleton"	2012	Yume Miru Uchuu	Atsushi Sakurai	Hisashi Imai	
"Les Enfants Terribles"	2009	Memento Mori	Hisashi Imai	Hisashi Imai	
"Lily"	2007	Tenshi no Revolver	Hisashi Imai	Hisashi Imai	
"Limbo"	2003	Mona Lisa Overdrive	Atsushi Sakurai	Hisashi Imai	
"Lion"	1993	Darker Than Darkness: Style 93	Atsushi Sakurai	Hisashi Imai	
"Living on the Net"	1996	Cosmos	Hisashi Imai	Hisashi Imai	
"Lizard Skin no Shoujo"	1997	Sexy Stream Liner	Hisashi Imai	Hisashi Imai	
"Long Distance Call"	2002	Kyokutou I Love You	Atsushi Sakurai	Hisashi Imai	
"Loop"	1995	Six/Nine	Atsushi Sakurai	Hisashi Imai	
"Loop Mark II"	1995	Six/Nine	Instrumental	Hisashi Imai	
"Love Letter"	1995	Six/Nine	Hisashi Imai	Hisashi Imai	
"Love Me"	1990	Aku no Hana	Atsushi Sakurai	Hisashi Imai	Re-recorded for the Koroshi no Shirabe: This Is Not Greatest Hits album in 1992
"Love Parade" †	2014	Non-album single	Atsushi Sakurai	Hidehiko Hoshino	
"Lullaby II"	2005	Juusankai wa Gekkou	Hisashi Imai	Hisashi Imai	
"Lullaby-III"	2009	Memento Mori	Atsushi Sakurai	Hisashi Imai	
"Luna Park"	2020	"Datenshi"	Sakurai/Imai	Hidehiko Hoshino	Single B-side
"M・A・D" †	1991	Kurutta Taiyou	Atsushi Sakurai	Hisashi Imai	Re-recorded for the Koroshi no Shirabe: This Is Not Greatest Hits album in 1992
"Maboroshi no Miyako"	1990	Aku no Hana	Atsushi Sakurai	Hisashi Imai	
"Mabushikute Mienai" †	2025	Non-album single	Hisashi Imai	Hisashi Imai	
"Machine"	1991	Kurutta Taiyou	Hisashi Imai	Hisashi Imai	Re-recorded for the limited edition of the Catalogue Ariola 00–10 album in 2012
"Madman Blues -Minashigo no Yuuutsu-"	1993	Darker Than Darkness: Style 93	Hisashi Imai	Hisashi Imai	
"Maimu Mime"	2020	Abracadabra	Atsushi Sakurai	Hisashi Imai	
"Makka na Yoru"	2008	Memento Mori	Atsushi Sakurai	Hisashi Imai	
"Manjusaka"	2016	Atom Miraiha No.9	Atsushi Sakurai	Hidehiko Hoshino	
"Maria"	1996	Cosmos	Atsushi Sakurai	Hisashi Imai	
"Masque"	2014	Arui wa Anarchy	Atsushi Sakurai	Hisashi Imai	
"Megami"	2000	One Life, One Death	Atsushi Sakurai	Hidehiko Hoshino	
"Meiousei de Shine"	2024	Subrosa	Hisashi Imai	Hisashi Imai	
"Melancholia"	2014	Arui wa Anarchy	Atsushi Sakurai	Hisashi Imai	
"Memento Mori"	2009	Memento Mori	Hisashi Imai	Hisashi Imai	
"Memories..."	1988	Seventh Heaven	Hisashi Imai	Hisashi Imai	
"Message"	2009	Memento Mori	Atsushi Sakurai	Hidehiko Hoshino	
"Mienai Mono wo Miyou to Suru Gokai Subete Gokai da" †	1995	Six/Nine	Atsushi Sakurai	Hisashi Imai	
"Mis-Cast"	1987	Sexual XXXXX!	Hisashi Imai	Hisashi Imai	
"Miss Take" †	2012	Yume Miru Uchuu	Hisashi Imai	Hisashi Imai	
"Misshitsu"	1995	Six/Nine	Atsushi Sakurai	Hidehiko Hoshino	
"Misty Blue"	1990	Aku no Hana	Atsushi Sakurai	Hisashi Imai	
"Misty Zone"	1988	Romanesque	Hisashi Imai	Hisashi Imai	
"Miu" †	1999	Non-album single	Atsushi Sakurai	Hidehiko Hoshino	
"Mona Lisa"	2003	Mona Lisa Overdrive	Hisashi Imai	Hisashi Imai	
"Monster"	2003	Mona Lisa Overdrive	Atsushi Sakurai	Hidehiko Hoshino	
"Montage"	2007	Tenshi no Revolver	Hisashi Imai	Hisashi Imai	
"Moon Light"	1987	Hurry Up Mode	Atsushi Sakurai	Hisashi Imai	Re-recorded for the Koroshi no Shirabe: This Is Not Greatest Hits album in 1992
"Moon Sayonara wo Oshiete" †	2018	No.0	Atsushi Sakurai	Hisashi Imai	
"Moonlight Escape" †	2020	Abracadabra	Atsushi Sakurai	Hisashi Imai	
"Motel 13"	2009	Memento Mori	Atsushi Sakurai	Hidehiko Hoshino	
"Mr. Darkness & Mrs. Moonlight"	2007	Tenshi no Revolver	Hisashi Imai	Hisashi Imai	
"Muchi no Namida"	1997	Sexy Stream Liner	Atsushi Sakurai	Hisashi Imai	
"Mudai"	2014	Arui wa Anarchy	Atsushi Sakurai	Hisashi Imai	
"Mugen"	2010	Razzle Dazzle	Atsushi Sakurai	Hidehiko Hoshino	
"Mugen Loop" †	2023	Izora	Atsushi Sakurai	Hisashi Imai	
"Muma - The Nightmare"	2005	Juusankai wa Gekkou	Atsushi Sakurai	Hisashi Imai	
"Muyuubyou Sleep Walk"	2024	Subrosa	Hisashi Imai	Hisashi Imai	
"My Baby Japanese"	1998	"Gessekai"	Atsushi Sakurai	Hidehiko Hoshino	Single B-side; re-recorded as the B-side of "Miss Take: Boku wa Miss Take" in 2012
"My Eyes & Your Eyes"	1987	Sexual XXXXX!	Hisashi Imai	Hisashi Imai	Re-recorded as the B-side of "Rendezvous" in 2007
"My Fuckin' Valentine"	1997	Sexy Stream Liner	Hisashi Imai	Hisashi Imai	
"My Funny Valentine"	1991	Kurutta Taiyou	Atsushi Sakurai	Hisashi Imai	
"Na mo Naki Watashi"	2023	Izora	Atsushi Sakurai	Hisashi Imai	
"Nakayubi"	2003	Mona Lisa Overdrive	Hisashi Imai	Hisashi Imai	
"Narcissus"	1991	"Speed"	Atsushi Sakurai	Hidehiko Hoshino	Single B-side
"National Media Boys"	1990	Aku no Hana	Hisashi Imai	Hisashi Imai	
"New World" †	2016	Atom Miraiha No.9	Atsushi Sakurai	Hisashi Imai	
"Ningyo -Mermaid-"	2012	Yume Miru Uchuu	Atsushi Sakurai	Hidehiko Hoshino	
"No-No-Boy"	1987	Hurry Up Mode	Hisashi Imai	Hisashi Imai	
"Nocturne -Rain Song-"	2003	"Gensou no Hana"	Hisashi Imai	Hisashi Imai	Single B-side
"Noraneko Blue"	2023	Izora	Atsushi Sakurai	Hisashi Imai	
"Nostalgia -Vita Mechanichalis-"	2018	No.0	Hisashi Imai	Hisashi Imai	
"Not Found"	2014	Arui wa Anarchy	Hisashi Imai	Hisashi Imai	
"Omae no Inu ni Naru"	2010	Romantist - The Stalin, Michiro Endo Tribute Album	Michiro Endo	Michiro Endo	
"Once Upon a Time"	2014	Arui wa Anarchy	Hisashi Imai	Hisashi Imai	
"One Night Ballet"	1987	Hurry Up Mode	Hisashi Imai	Hisashi Imai	
"Only You"	2012	Yume Miru Uchuu	Hisashi Imai	Hisashi Imai	
"Ophelia"	2018	No.0	Atsushi Sakurai	Hidehiko Hoshino	
"Oriental Love Story"	1988	Seventh Heaven	Atsushi Sakurai	Hisashi Imai	Re-recorded for the Koroshi no Shirabe: This Is Not Greatest Hits album in 1992
"Oukoku Kingdom Come -Moon Rise-"	2002	Kyokutou I Love You	Atsushi Sakurai	Hisashi Imai	
"Paradeno Mori"	2024	Subrosa	Hidehiko Hoshino	Hidehiko Hoshino	
"Paradise"	1999	"Miu"	Atsushi Sakurai	Hisashi Imai	Single B-side
"Passion"	2005	Juusankai wa Gekkou	Atsushi Sakurai	Hidehiko Hoshino	
"Peace"	2020	Abracadabra	Instrumental	Hisashi Imai	
"Phantom Voltaire"	2014	Arui wa Anarchy	Atsushi Sakurai	Hisashi Imai	
"Physical Neurose"	1988	Seventh Heaven	Hisashi Imai	Hisashi Imai	
"Pinoa Icchio -Odoru Atom-"	2016	Atom Miraiha No.9	Hisashi Imai	Hisashi Imai	
"Pixy"	2010	Razzle Dazzle	Atsushi Sakurai	Hidehiko Hoshino	
"Plastic Syndrome Type II"	1986	Hurry Up Mode	Hisashi Imai	Atsushi Sakurai	
"Pleasure Land"	1990	Aku no Hana	Hidehiko Hoshino	Hidehiko Hoshino	
"Prologue"	1987	Hurry Up Mode	Hisashi Imai	Atsushi Sakurai	
"Psyche"	2024	Subrosa	Hisashi Imai	Hidehiko Hoshino	
"Quantum I"	2023	Izora	Instrumental	Hisashi Imai	
"Quantum II"	2023	Izora	Instrumental	Hisashi Imai	
"Que Sera Sera Elegy"	2020	Abracadabra	Hisashi Imai	Hisashi Imai	
"Raijin Fuujin - Resonance" †	2024	Subrosa	Hisashi Imai	Hisashi Imai	
"Rain"	2007	Tenshi no Revolver	Atsushi Sakurai	Hisashi Imai	
"Rakuen"	1995	Six/Nine	Atsushi Sakurai	Hidehiko Hoshino	
"Rasenchuu"	1997	Sexy Stream Liner	Atsushi Sakurai	Hidehiko Hoshino	
"Razzle Dazzle"	2010	Razzle Dazzle	Hisashi Imai	Hisashi Imai	
"Razzle Dazzle Fragile"	2010	Razzle Dazzle	Instrumental	Hisashi Imai	
"Reishiki 13-gata "Ai""	2018	No.0	Atsushi Sakurai	Hisashi Imai	
"Rendezvous" †	2007	Tenshi no Revolver	Atsushi Sakurai	Hisashi Imai	
"Revolver"	2007	Tenshi no Revolver	Atsushi Sakurai	Hisashi Imai	
"Rezisto"	2024	Subrosa	Hisashi Imai	Hisashi Imai	
"Rhapsody"	2000	One Life, One Death	Hisashi Imai	Hisashi Imai	
"Rokugatsu no Okinawa"	1993	"Dress"	Atsushi Sakurai	Hidehiko Hoshino	Single B-side
"Romance" †	2005	Juusankai wa Gekkou	Atsushi Sakurai	Hisashi Imai	
"Romanesque"	1987	Hurry Up Mode	Hisashi Imai	Hisashi Imai	Re-recorded for the Romanesque EP in 1988
"Rondo" †	2019	Non-album single	Atsushi Sakurai	Hisashi Imai	
"Sabbat"	1990	Aku no Hana	Atsushi Sakurai	Hidehiko Hoshino	
"Sakura"	1991	Kurutta Taiyou	Atsushi Sakurai	Hisashi Imai	
"Sakuran Baby"	2010	Razzle Dazzle	Atsushi Sakurai	Hisashi Imai	
"Salome"	2018	No.0	Atsushi Sakurai	Hidehiko Hoshino	
"Sane"	1996	Cosmos	Atsushi Sakurai	Hisashi Imai	Re-recorded as the B-side of "Elise no Tame ni -Rock For Elise-" in 2012
"Sapphire"	2000	One Life, One Death	Atsushi Sakurai	Hisashi Imai	
"Sasayaki" †	1997	Sexy Stream Liner	Atsushi Sakurai	Hisashi Imai	
"Satan"	2014	Arui wa Anarchy	Atsushi Sakurai	Hidehiko Hoshino	
"Sayonara Shelter"	2022	Izora	Atsushi Sakurai	Hidehiko Hoshino	
"Scarecrow"	2023	Izora	Atsushi Sakurai	Hisashi Imai	
"Schiz.o Gensou"	1997	Sexy Stream Liner	Atsushi Sakurai	Hisashi Imai	
"Secret Reaction"	1987	Hurry Up Mode	Hisashi Imai	Hisashi Imai	
"Sekai wa Yami de Michite Iru"	2014	Arui wa Anarchy	Hisashi Imai	Hisashi Imai	
"Seraphim"	2005	Juusankai wa Gekkou	Hisashi Imai	Hisashi Imai	
"Serenade -Itoshi no Umbrella-"	2009	Memento Mori	Hisashi Imai	Hisashi Imai	
"Seventh Heaven"	1988	Seventh Heaven	Hisashi Imai	Hisashi Imai	
"Sex for You"	1989	Taboo	Atsushi Sakurai	Hisashi Imai	
"Sexual XXXXX!"	1987	Sexual XXXXX!	Atsushi Sakurai	Hisashi Imai	
"Sexy Stream Liner"	1997	Sexy Stream Liner	Instrumental	Hisashi Imai	
"Shanikusai -Carnival-"	2002	Kyokutou I Love You	Atsushi Sakurai	Hidehiko Hoshino	
"Shibuya Hurry Upper!" †	2025	Non-album single	Hisashi Imai	Hisashi Imai	
"Shinkeishitsu na Kaidan"	2024	Subrosa	Instrumental	Hisashi Imai	
"Shippuu no Blade Runner"	2002	Kyokutou I Love You	Hisashi Imai	Hisashi Imai	
"Sid Vicious on the Beach"	2003	Mona Lisa Overdrive	Hisashi Imai	Hisashi Imai	
"Silent Night"	1989	Taboo	Atsushi Sakurai	Hisashi Imai	
"Sissy Boy"	1987	Sexual XXXXX!	Hisashi Imai	Hisashi Imai	
"Snow White"	2007	Tenshi no Revolver	Atsushi Sakurai	Hidehiko Hoshino	
"Solaris"	2010	Razzle Dazzle	Atsushi Sakurai	Hisashi Imai	
"Somewhere Nowhere"	1995	Six/Nine	Atsushi Sakurai	Hisashi Imai	
"Sonzai Riyuu Kai" †	2026	Non-album single	Hisashi Imai	Hisashi Imai	
"Sophia Dream"	2020	Abracadabra	Hisashi Imai	Hisashi Imai	
"Speed" †	1991	Kurutta Taiyou	Atsushi Sakurai	Hisashi Imai	Re-recorded for the Koroshi no Shirabe: This Is Not Greatest Hits album in 1992
"Spider"	2007	Tenshi no Revolver	Atsushi Sakurai	Hisashi Imai	
"Stay Gold"	1987	Hurry Up Mode	Hisashi Imai	Hisashi Imai	
"Steppers -Parade-" †	2014	Non-album single	Sakurai/Imai	Hisashi Imai	
"Strelitzia"	2024	Subrosa	Instrumental	Hisashi Imai	
"Subrosa"	2024	Subrosa	Hisashi Imai	Hisashi Imai	
"Survival Dance"	2014	Arui wa Anarchy	Atsushi Sakurai	Hidehiko Hoshino	
"Suzumebachi"	2009	Memento Mori	Hisashi Imai	Hisashi Imai	
"Taboo"	1989	Taboo	Atsushi Sakurai	Hisashi Imai	Re-recorded for the Koroshi no Shirabe: This Is Not Greatest Hits album in 1992
"Tainai Kaiki"	2018	No.0	Atsushi Sakurai	Hisashi Imai	
"Taiyou to Ikaros" †	2023	Izora	Atsushi Sakurai	Hidehiko Hoshino	
"Taiyou ni Korosareta"	1991	Kurutta Taiyou	Atsushi Sakurai	Hisashi Imai	
"Tango Swanka"	2010	Razzle Dazzle	Sakurai/Imai	Hisashi Imai	
"Telephone Murder"	1987	Hurry Up Mode	Hisashi Imai	Hisashi Imai	
"Tasogare no Howling"	2024	Subrosa	Hisashi Imai	Hisashi Imai	
"Tenshi wa Dare da"	2009	Memento Mori	Hisashi Imai	Hisashi Imai	
"Thanatos"	1997	Sexy Stream Liner	Atsushi Sakurai	Hisashi Imai	
"The Falling Down"	2023	Izora	Hisashi Imai	Hisashi Imai	
"The Seaside Story"	2016	Atom Miraiha No.9	Hisashi Imai	Hisashi Imai	
"The World Is Yours"	1990	Aku no Hana	Atsushi Sakurai	Hisashi Imai	
"Theme of B-T"	2002	Hurry Up Mode (1990 Mix) (2002 Digital Remaster)	Instrumental	Nozomu Naka	
"Thing III"	2001	One Life, One Death Cut Up	Instrumental	Hisashi Imai	
"Tight Rope"	1996	Cosmos	Atsushi Sakurai	Hisashi Imai	Re-recorded as the B-side of "Alice in Wonder Underground" in 2007
"Tiki Tiki Boom"	2024	Subrosa	Hisashi Imai	Hisashi Imai	
"To-Search" †	1986	Non-album single	Hisashi Imai	Hisashi Imai	Re-recorded as the B-side of "Just One More Kiss" in 1988
"Tokyo"	1989	Taboo	Atsushi Sakurai	Hisashi Imai	
"Trans"	2000	"Glamorous"	Atsushi Sakurai	Hidehiko Hoshino	Single B-side
"Trigger"	2002	Kyokutou I Love You	Atsushi Sakurai	Hisashi Imai	
"Tsuki no Sabaku"	2020	Abracadabra	Atsushi Sakurai	Hidehiko Hoshino	
"Uchuu Circus"	2014	Arui wa Anarchy	Atsushi Sakurai	Hidehiko Hoshino	
"Umbrella"	2009	Memento Mori	Hisashi Imai	Hisashi Imai	
"Under the Moon Light"	1990	"Aku no Hana"	Yutaka Higuchi	Hisashi Imai	Single B-side
"Urahara-Juku"	2020	Abracadabra	Atsushi Sakurai	Hisashi Imai	
"Uta" †	1995	Six/Nine	Atsushi Sakurai	Hisashi Imai	Re-recorded as the B-side of "Go-Go B-T Train" in 2021
"Utsusemi"	2006	"Kagerou"	Atsushi Sakurai	Hidehiko Hoshino	Single B-side
"Vacuum Dream"	1987	Hurry Up Mode	Hisashi Imai	Hisashi Imai	
"Valkyrie no Kikou"	2023	Izora	Atsushi Sakurai	Hisashi Imai	
"Victims of Love"	1988	Seventh Heaven	Atsushi Sakurai	Hisashi Imai	Re-recorded for the Koroshi no Shirabe: This Is Not Greatest Hits album in 1992 and again as the B-side for "Keijijou Ryuusei" in 2014
"Villain"	2020	Abracadabra	Sakurai/Imai	Hisashi Imai	
"Voo Doo"	2010	"Dokudanjou Beauty"	Atsushi Sakurai	Hidehiko Hoshino	Single B-side
"Warp Day"	2002	Kyokutou I Love You	Atsushi Sakurai	Hisashi Imai	
"Who's Clown?"	2005	Juusankai wa Gekkou	Instrumental	Hisashi Imai	
"Yasou"	2012	Yume Miru Uchuu	Atsushi Sakurai	Hisashi Imai	
"Yougetsu"	2010	Razzle Dazzle	Atsushi Sakurai	Hidehiko Hoshino	
"Yume Miru Uchuu"	2012	Yume Miru Uchuu	Atsushi Sakurai	Hisashi Imai	
"Yumeji"	2012	Yume Miru Uchuu	Atsushi Sakurai	Hidehiko Hoshino	
"Yuusei Tsuushin"	2024	Subrosa	Hisashi Imai	Hisashi Imai	
"Yuuwaku"	1993	Darker Than Darkness: Style 93	Atsushi Sakurai	Hidehiko Hoshino	
"Zangai" †	2003	Mona Lisa Overdrive	Atsushi Sakurai	Hisashi Imai	
"Zekkai"	2007	Tenshi no Revolver	Atsushi Sakurai	Hisashi Imai	
"Zero"	1993	Darker Than Darkness: Style 93	Atsushi Sakurai	Hisashi Imai	
"Zetsubou to Iu Na no Kimi e"	2024	Subrosa	Hisashi Imai	Hidehiko Hoshino	
