= BT (album) =

Compilation album by Buck-Tick
- Released: March 20, 1999; September 5, 2007 (re-release)
- Recorded: 1987–1996
- Genres: Alternative rock; punk rock; post-punk; gothic rock; industrial rock; power pop
- Length: 154:27
- Label: Happy House

Buck-Tick chronology
Sweet Strange Live Disc (1998)	BT (1999)	97BT99 (2000)

BT (short for "Best Tracks") is the third compilation album by Buck-Tick, released on March 20, 1999. It compiles every single and B-side the band released while signed to Victor Entertainment, except for the live B-sides of "Die", alongside selected tracks from the band's studio albums and a previously unreleased demo version of "Romanesque". It reached number sixteen on the Oricon chart. The first-pressing limited edition was bundled with an additional photo book in the size of a standard CD booklet with pictures from the band's tenure with Victor. The album was re-released on September 5, 2007.

== Track listing ==
=== Disc One ===
All lyrics are written by Atsushi Sakurai except where noted; all music is composed by Hisashi Imai except where noted.

No.	Title	Lyrics	Music	Original album	Length
1.	"Sexual XXXXX!"			Sexual XXXXX!	3:35
2.	"Hyper Love"	Imai		Sexual XXXXX!	5:05
3.	"Romanesque" (previously unreleased version)	Imai		Hurry Up Mode and Romanesque (EP)	3:55
4.	"...In Heaven..."			Seventh Heaven	3:53
5.	"Just One More Kiss" (edit)			Taboo	4:22
6.	"To Search" (B-side version)	Imai		Indies single release, re-recorded for the B-side to "Just One More Kiss" single	4:59
7.	"Iconoclasm"	Imai		Taboo	3:00
8.	"Aku no Hana" (悪の華; Evil Flower) (single version)			Aku no Hana	4:13
9.	"Under the Moon Light"	Higuchi		B-side to "Aku no Hana" single	3:41
10.	"Love Me"			Aku no Hana	3:15
11.	"Speed" (スピード) (single version)			Kurutta Taiyou	4:53
12.	"Narcissus" (ナルシス)		Hoshino	B-side to "Speed" single	4:12
13.	"Taiyou ni Korosareta" (太陽ニ殺サレタ; Killed by the Sun)			Kurutta Taiyou	6:07
14.	"M・A・D" (single version)			Kurutta Taiyou	4:25
15.	"Angelic Conversation" (B-side version)	Imai		Taboo, re-recorded for the B-side to "M・A・D" single	5:39
16.	"Jupiter" (single version)		Hoshino	Kurutta Taiyou	4:59
17.	"Sakura" (さくら; Cherry Blossom) (B-side version)			Kurutta Taiyou	6:15
Total length:					76:08

=== Disc Two ===
All lyrics are written by Atsushi Sakurai; all music is composed by Hisashi Imai except where noted.

No.	Title	Music	Original album	Length
1.	"Dress" (ドレス) (single version)	Hoshino	Darker Than Darkness: Style 93	6:00
2.	"Rokugatsu no Okinawa" (六月の沖縄; Okinawa June)	Hoshino	B-side to "Dress" single	5:55
3.	"Kirameki no Naka de..." (キラメキの中で ・・・; In the Glitter・・・)		Darker Than Darkness: Style 93	4:44
4.	"Die" (single version)		Darker Than Darkness: Style 93	4:26
5.	"D・T・D"		Darker Than Darkness: Style 93	6:43
6.	"Uta" (唄; Song) (single version)		Six/Nine	4:05
7.	"Kimi e" (君へ; To You)	Hoshino	B-side to "Uta" single	4:31
8.	"Itoshi no Rock Star" (愛しのロック・スター; Beloved Rockstar)	Hoshino	Six/Nine	4:52
9.	"Kodou" (鼓動; Heartbeat) (single version)		Six/Nine	6:27
10.	"Rakuen" (楽園; Paradise) (B-side version)	Hoshino	Six/Nine	4:50
11.	"Mienai Mono wo Miyou to Suru Gokai Subete Gokai da" (見えない物を見ようとする誤解 全て誤解だ; Misunderstanding in Trying to See the Invisible, Everything Is Misunderstood) (single version)		Six/Nine	4:41
12.	"Kimi no Vanilla" (君のヴァニラ; Your Vanilla) (B-side version)		Six/Nine	4:25
13.	"Candy" (キャンディ) (single version)		Cosmos	4:26
14.	"Chocolate" (チョコレート) (B-side version)	Hoshino	Cosmos	4:00
15.	"Ash-ra"		Cosmos	5:12
16.	"Cosmos"		Cosmos	5:02
Total length:				78:19

== Personnel ==
- Atsushi Sakurai - lead vocals
- Hisashi Imai - lead guitar, backing vocals
- Hidehiko Hoshino - rhythm guitar, backing vocals
- Yutaka Higuchi - bass
- Toll Yagami - drums
