= Atom Miraiha No.9 =

Studio album by Buck-Tick
- Released: September 28, 2016
- Studio: Victor, Alive, Studio Sound Dalo
- Genre: Industrial rock
- Length: 56:34
- Label: Lingua Sounda/Victor
- Producer: Buck-Tick

Buck-Tick chronology
Arui wa Anarchy (2014)	Atom Miraiha No.9 (2016)	No.0 (2018)

Singles from Atom Miraiha No.9
- 1. "New World" Released: September 21, 2016

Atom Miraiha No.9 (アトム 未来派 No.9, "Atom Futurist No.9") is the twentieth studio album by Japanese rock band Buck-Tick released on September 28, 2016. It is the first album released after Lingua Sounda was made a sub-label of Victor, making it their first album since 1996's Cosmos to be released through Victor. Takeshi Ueda of AA= and The Mad Capsule Markets performs as a guest on the track "Pinoa Icchio -Odoru Atom-". The album was 5th on the Oricon weekly chart and 6th on Billboard Japan's album chart.

== Track listing ==
No.	Title	Lyrics	Music	Length
1.	"Cum uh Sol nu -Flask no Besshu-" (cum uh sol nu -フラスコの別種-)	Imai	Imai	3:53
2.	"Pinoa Icchio -Odoru Atom-" (PINOA ICCHIO -躍るアトム-)	Imai	Imai	2:30
3.	"Devil's Wings"	Sakurai	Imai	4:43
4.	"El Dorado"	Sakurai	Hoshino	3:58
5.	"Bi Neo Universe" (美 NEO Universe)	Sakurai	Imai	5:05
6.	"Boy Septem Peccata Mortalia"	Sakurai	Imai	4:21
7.	"Jukai" (樹海)	Sakurai	Hoshino	3:46
8.	"The Seaside Story"	Imai	Imai	3:27
9.	"Future Song -Mirai ga Tōru-" (FUTURE SONG -未来が通る-)	Imai, Sakurai	Imai	3:57
10.	"Manjusaka" (曼珠沙華 manjusaka)	Sakurai	Hoshino	4:39
11.	"Cuba Libre"	Sakurai	Imai	4:34
12.	"Ai no Sōretsu" (愛の葬列)	Sakurai	Imai	6:51
13.	"New World -Beginning-"	Sakurai	Imai	4:45
Total length:				56:34

== Personnel ==
Buck-Tick

- Atsushi Sakurai – vocals
- Hisashi Imai – guitar, vocals on "Future Song"
- Hidehiko Hoshino – guitar
- Yutaka Higuchi – bass
- Toll Yagami – drums
