= Tenshi no Revolver =

Studio album by Buck-Tick
- Released: September 19, 2007
- Recorded: April–June 2007 at Victor Studio in Tokyo; Heartbeat Studios in Tokyo; Studio Sound Dali in Tokyo
- Genre: Alternative rock
- Length: 55:41
- Language: Japanese, English
- Label: BMG Japan
- Producer: Hitoshi Hiruma

Buck-Tick chronology
Juusankai wa Gekkou (2005)	Tenshi no Revolver (2007)	Memento Mori (2009)

Singles from Tenshi no Revolver
- 1. "Rendezvous" Released: June 6, 2007; 2. "Alice in Wonder Underground" Released: August 8, 2007

Tenshi no Revolver (天使のリボルバー; lit. "Angel's Revolver") is the fifteenth studio album by Japanese rock band Buck-Tick, released by BMG Japan on September 19, 2007. The group deliberately focused on melody and adopted a straight rock "band sound" for the album. Preceded by the singles "Rendezvous" and "Alice in Wonder Underground", Tenshi no Revolver reached number five on the Oricon Albums Chart. Buck-Tick continued the musical approach they adopted on this album for their next two as well, Memento Mori (2009) and Razzle Dazzle (2010).

== Overview ==
For the album, Buck-Tick went for a "band sound", the sound of an ordinary straight rock band. Guitarist Hisashi Imai also said they focused on melodies, "something pop and catchy" and unlike those of their previous two albums, Mona Lisa Overdrive (2003) and Juusankai wa Gekkou (2005). Katsushige Okazaki, the drummer for Imai's side-band Lucy, contributed to the album. According to Yuka Okubo, the lyrics on the album are "realistic" and "raw". Okubo also wrote that the album's title combines the contradictory elements of "angels", which are unrealistic beings, and "revolvers", which are real things and tools for killing, and explores the boundary between fantasy and reality.

Tenshi no Revolver was originally scheduled to be released on September 5, 2007. However, it was postponed and eventually released on September 19, 2007. A limited edition came with a DVD of the music videos for the singles "Rendezvous" and "Alice in Wonder Underground". Additionally, people who purchased both singles had the chance to enter a lottery to win a DVD containing a special music clip.

The band held a long 34-date national tour to support the album. It began on September 22, lasted until December 29, and included three of their special Day in Question concerts. Coinciding with the stripped back nature of the album's music, the stage setup for the tour was also much simpler than usual.

On December 29, 2017, Tenshi no Revolver was released on Blu-Spec CD2 as part of a re-release of all of Buck-Tick's albums in commemoration of their 30th anniversary.

== Reception ==
Tenshi no Revolver peaked at number five on the Oricon Albums Chart, with 23,114 copies sold. The 2017 re-release peaked at number 241 on the chart.

== Track listing ==
All lyrics are written by Atsushi Sakurai, except where noted; all music is composed by Hisashi Imai, except where noted.

No.	Title	Lyrics	Music	Length
1.	"Mr. Darkness & Mrs. Moonlight"	Imai		4:29
2.	"Rendezvous" (RENDEZVOUS ～ランデヴー～)			4:45
3.	"Montage" (モンタージュ)	Imai		4:27
4.	"Lily" (リリィ)	Imai		3:41
5.	"La Vie en Rose" (La vie en Rose ～ラヴィアン・ローズ～)		Hidehiko Hoshino	3:59
6.	"Cream Soda"		Hoshino	3:38
7.	"Rain"			5:37
8.	"Beast"			4:12
9.	"Zekkai" (絶界)			3:56
10.	"Snow White"		Hoshino	4:31
11.	"Spider" (スパイダー)			3:35
12.	"Alice in Wonder Underground"	Imai		4:07
13.	"Revolver"			4:51
Total length:				55:41

== Personnel ==
- Atsushi Sakurai – lead vocals
- Hisashi Imai – lead guitar, backing vocals
- Hidehiko Hoshino – rhythm guitar, backing vocals
- Yutaka Higuchi – bass
- Toll Yagami – drums

Additional performers

- Kazutoshi Yokoyama – manipulation, keyboards
- Katsushige Okazaki – timpani, drum supervision
- Selia – countertenor on "Mr. Darkness & Mrs. Moonlight" and "Revolver"
- Mio Okamura – violin on "Rain" and "Snow White"

Production

- Hitoshi Hiruma – producer, mixing, recording
- Shigenobu Karube – executive producer
- Kenichi Arai; Mikiro Yamada – engineers
- Yosuke Watanabe; Kiyoko Asai; Seiji Toda – assistant engineers
- Tim Young – mastering
- Ken Sakaguchi – art direction
- Kishin Shinoyama – cover art, photography
- Mitsuaki Koshizuka; Hiroshi Harada – additional photography
