= Rendezvous (Buck-Tick song) =

- Regular edition cover

Single by Buck-Tick

from the album Tenshi no Revolver
- Released: June 6, 2007
- Recorded: 2007
- Genre: Rock
- Length: 9:54
- Label: BMG Japan/Ariola Japan
- Songwriter(s): Hisashi Imai; Atsushi Sakurai
- Producer(s): Hitoshi Hiruma

Buck-Tick singles chronology
"Kagerou" (2006)	"Rendezvous" (2007)	"Alice in Wonder Underground" (2007)

"Rendezvous" (RENDEZVOUS～ランデヴー～) is the twenty-fifth single by the Japanese rock band Buck-Tick, released on June 6, 2007. The title track deviates from the band's usual darker themes, both the beat and lyrics are lighthearted and upbeat. The second track is an updated version of My Eyes and Your Eyes, originally featured on the 1987 album Sexual XXXXX!. It placed 9th on Oricon's weekly chart.

== Track listing ==
#	Title	Length	Lyrics	Music
1	"Rendezvous"	4:51	Atsushi Sakurai	Hisashi Imai
2	"MY EYES AND YOUR EYES"	5:03	Hisashi Imai	Hisashi Imai

== Musicians ==
- Atsushi Sakurai - Voice
- Hisashi Imai - Guitar
- Hidehiko Hoshino - Guitar
- Yutaka Higuchi - Bass
- Toll Yagami - Drums
