= Miss Take: Boku wa Miss Take =

- Regular edition cover

Single by Buck-Tick

from the album Yume Miru Uchuu
- Released: July 4, 2012
- Recorded: October 2011 – April 2012
- Genre: Rock
- Length: 4:47
- Label: Lingua Sounda (Victor Entertainment)
- Songwriter(s): Hisashi Imai
- Producer(s): Buck-Tick, Junichi Tanaka

Buck-Tick singles chronology
"Elise no tame ni" (2012)	"Miss Take: Boku wa Miss Take" (2012)	"Love Parade/Steppers -Parade-" (2014)

"Miss Take: Boku wa Miss Take" (MISS TAKE 〜僕はミス・テイク〜) is the thirty-second single by the Japanese rock band Buck-Tick, released on July 4, 2012.

== Charts ==
The single peaked at number 11 on the Oricon Singles Chart.

== Track listing ==
No.	Title	Lyrics	Music	Length
1.	"Miss Take: Boku wa Miss Take" (MISS TAKE～僕はミス・テイク～)	Imai	Imai	4:47
2.	"Only You"	Imai	Imai	4:04
3.	"My Baby Japanese: Type II"	Sakurai	Hoshino	3:27
Total length:				12:18

== Musicians ==
- Atsushi Sakurai – vocals
- Hisashi Imai – guitar
- Hidehiko Hoshino – guitar
- Yutaka Higuchi – bass
- Toll Yagami – drums
