= One Life, One Death =

Studio album by Buck-Tick
- Released: September 20, 2000
- Genre: Industrial rock
- Length: 49:42
- Label: BMG Funhouse
- Producer: Buck-Tick

Buck-Tick chronology
| 97BT99 (2000) | One Life, One Death (2000) | One Life, One Death Cut Up (2001) |

Singles from One Life, One Death
- 1. "Glamorous" Released: September 6, 2000

One Life, One Death is the 11th album by Buck-Tick and their first on BMG/Funhouse, released on September 20, 2000. The title comes from lyrics to "Cyborg Dolly: Sora-mimi: Phantom", which also mentions cloning sheep and is named after the famous Dolly. It reached number eleven on the Oricon chart with 30,170 copies sold. Starting from this album, Hisashi Imai started using computers when composing and he stated that he struggled to produce the sound he imagined.

== Track listing ==
| No. | Title | Lyrics | Music | Length |
|---|---|---|---|---|
| 1. | "Baby, I Want You." | Sakurai | Imai | 4:58 |
| 2. | "Check Up" | Imai | Imai | 5:45 |
| 3. | "Glamorous -Fluxus-" | Sakurai | Imai | 4:35 |
| 4. | "Cyborg Dolly: Sora-mimi: Phantom" (細胞具ドリー: ソラミミ:PHANTOM) | Imai | Imai | 4:12 |
| 5. | "Cain" (カイン) | Sakurai | Imai | 4:39 |
| 6. | "Death Wish" | Sakurai | Hoshino | 4:19 |
| 7. | "Megami" (女神) | Sakurai | Hoshino | 4:39 |
| 8. | "Sapphire" (サファイア) | Sakurai | Imai | 4:55 |
| 9. | "Rhapsody" | Imai | Imai | 5:59 |
| 10. | "Flame" | Sakurai | Imai | 5:41 |
| Total length: | | | | 49:42 |

== Personnel ==
=== Buck-Tick ===
- Atsushi Sakurai - vocal
- Hisashi Imai - electric guitar, vocal
- Hidehiko Hoshino - rhythm guitar
- Yutaka Higuchi - bass guitar
- Toll Yagami - drums

=== Additional musicians ===
- Kazutoshi Yokoyama - manipulation, keyboard
- Katsushige Okazaki - sampler
