= Yume Miru Uchuu =

Studio album by Buck-Tick
- Released: September 19, 2012
- Recorded: October 2011 – April 2012 at Alive Recording Studio, Victor Studio, Prime Sound Studio Form, Studio Sound Dali, Aobadai Studio
- Genre: Neo-psychedelia; dance-rock
- Length: 47:46
- Label: Lingua Sounda/Tokuma Japan
- Producer: Buck-Tick, Junichi Tanaka

Buck-Tick chronology
Catalogue Ariola 00–10 (2012)	Yume Miru Uchuu (2012)	Arui wa Anarchy (2014)

Singles from Yume Miru Uchuu
- 1. "Elise no Tame ni" Released: May 23, 2012; 2. "Miss Take ~Boku wa Miss Take~" Released: July 4, 2012

Yume Miru Uchuu (Japanese: 夢見る宇宙, Hepburn: Yume Miru Uchū; lit. "Dreaming Universe") is the 18th studio album by Japanese rock band Buck-Tick, released on September 19, 2012. It is their first on their own record label Lingua Sounda, which was founded the previous year. The album reached the number 14 position on the Oricon chart and number 12 on Billboard Japan, selling 19,807 copies.

The album's cover art is based on Austrian painter Gustav Klimt's Gold Fish. The limited-edition version of Yume Miru Uchuu has a different cover based on the painting and came with a DVD of footage from the band's June 10, 2012 concert at Hibiya Open-Air Concert Hall. It also contained the promotional video for "Climax Together", which was filmed on August 5 at Shinjuku Loft in front of 300 fans. Fans who bought both of the album's singles, "Miss Take ~Boku wa Miss Take~" and "Elise no Tame ni", were chosen by lottery to win tickets to the video shoot.

== Track listing ==
No.	Title	Lyrics	Music	Length
1.	"Elise no Tame ni -Rock For Elise-" (エリーゼのために -ROCK for Elise-)	Imai	Imai	4:24
2.	"Climax Together"	Imai	Imai	4:53
3.	"Lady Skeleton"	Sakurai	Imai	4:07
4.	"Ningyo -Mermaid-" (人魚 -mermaid-)	Sakurai	Hoshino	4:04
5.	"Yumeji" (夢路)	Sakurai	Hoshino	4:03
6.	"Only You -We Are Not Alone-"	Imai	Imai	4:06
7.	"Kinji Rareta Asobi -Adult Children-" (禁じられた遊び -ADULT CHILDREN-)	Sakurai	Imai	5:02
8.	"Yasou" (夜想)	Sakurai	Imai	3:50
9.	"Inter Raptor"	Sakurai	Imai	4:02
10.	"Miss Take –I'm Not Miss Take-"	Imai	Imai	4:48
11.	"Yume Miru Uchuu -Cosmix-" (夢見る宇宙 -cosmix-)	Sakurai	Imai	4:27

Limited Edition DVD
No.	Title	Length
1.	"Climax Together" (Music Video)
2.	"Night Side ~Rainy~" (Live concert recorded on June 10, 2012 at Hibiya Open-Air Concert Hall)
3.	"Elise no Tame ni" (エリーゼのために)
4.	"Revolver"
5.	"Shippuu no Blade Runner" (疾風のブレードランナー)
6.	"Yume Miru Uchuu" (夢見る宇宙)
7.	"My Fuckin' Valentine"

== Personnel ==
Buck-Tick

- Atsushi Sakurai – vocals
- Hisashi Imai – guitar, noise, chorus
- Hidehiko Hoshino – guitar, chorus
- Yutaka Higuchi – bass
- Toll Yagami – drums

Additional performers

- Kazutoshi Yokoyama – manipulator, synthesizer on tracks 1–3 & 6–11
- Cube Juice – manipulator, synthesizer on tracks 4 & 5
- Tabu Zombie (Soil & "Pimp" Sessions) – trumpet, brass arrangement on track 6
- Motoharu (Soil & "Pimp" Sessions) – tenor saxophone, brass arrangement on track 6
- Kenichi Fukushima – baritone saxophone on track 6
