= Kagerou (Buck-Tick song) =

"Kagero"

Single by Buck-Tick
- Released: August 2, 2006
- Recorded: 2006
- Genre: Rock
- Length: 9:19
- Label: BMG Japan/Ariola Japan
- Songwriters: Hisashi Imai; Atsushi Sakurai; Hidehiko Hoshino

Buck-Tick singles chronology
"Dress (Bloody Trinity Mix)" (2006)	"Kagero" (2006)	"Rendezvous" (2007)

"Kagero" (蜉蝣-かげろう-) is the twenty-fourth single by the Japanese rock band Buck-Tick, released on August 2, 2006. The song was used as ending theme of the anime series xxxHolic. It reached 17th position at Oricon Singles Chart, staying on chart for seven weeks.

== Track listing ==
#	Title	Length	Lyrics	Music
1	"Kagero"	4:53	Atsushi Sakurai	Hisashi Imai
2	"Utsusemi"	4:26	Atsushi Sakurai	Hidehiko Hoshino

== Musicians ==
- Atsushi Sakurai – vocals
- Hisashi Imai – guitar
- Hidehiko Hoshino – guitar
- Yutaka Higuchi – bass
- Toll Yagami – drums
