= Memento Mori (Buck-Tick album) =

Studio album by Buck-Tick
- Released: February 18, 2009
- Recorded: Victor Studio, Prim Sound Studio, Prim Sound Studio Form, Galva Studio, Zak Studio
- Genre: Garage rock
- Length: 67:25
- Label: Ariola Japan
- Producer: Buck-Tick

Buck-Tick chronology
Tenshi no Revolver (2007)	Memento Mori (2009)	Razzle Dazzle (2010)

Singles from Memento Mori
- 1. "Heaven" Released: December 17, 2008; 2. "Galaxy" Released: January 14, 2009

Memento Mori (Latin for "Remember that you have to die") is the sixteenth album by Japanese rock band Buck-Tick, released on February 18, 2009. The limited edition came with a DVD of the making of the album. It reached number seven on the Oricon chart with 23,410 copies sold.

Memento Mori continued the concept of a straight "band sound", which Buck-Tick began on Tenshi no Revolver. Satoshi Mishiba of Kinniku Shōjo Tai provides piano on "Katte ni Shiyagare" and "Message".

== Track listing ==
No.	Title	Lyrics	Music	Length
1.	"Makka na Yoru -Bloody-" (真っ赤な夜-Bloody-)	Sakurai	Imai	3:31
2.	"Les Enfants Terribles"	Imai	Imai	3:29
3.	"Galaxy"	Sakurai	Imai	4:21
4.	"Umbrella" (アンブレラ)	Imai	Imai	4:24
5.	"Katte ni Shiyagare" (勝手にしやがれ)	Sakurai	Hoshino	3:15
6.	"Coyote"	Sakurai	Imai	4:34
7.	"Message"	Sakurai	Hoshino	5:13
8.	"Memento Mori"	Imai	Imai	6:00
9.	"Jonathan Jet-Coaster"	Sakurai	Imai	3:57
10.	"Suzumebachi" (スズメバチ)		Imai	3:57
11.	"Lullaby-III"	Sakurai	Imai	4:13
12.	"Motel 13"	Sakurai	Hoshino	4:14
13.	"Serenade -Itoshi no Umbrella-Sweety-" (セレナーデ -愛しのアンブレラ-Sweety-)	Imai	Imai	5:13
14.	"Tenshi wa Dare da" (天使は誰だ)	Imai	Imai	5:02
15.	"Heaven"	Sakurai	Imai	5:34
Total length:				67:25

== Personnel ==
Buck-Tick

- Atsushi Sakurai – vocals
- Hisashi Imai – guitar, noise, electronics, chorus
- Hidehiko Hoshino – electric guitar, acoustic guitar, chorus
- Yutaka Higuchi – bass
- Toll Yagami – drums

Additional performers

- Kazutoshi Yokoyama – manipulator, keyboard
- Satoshi Mishiba – Hammond organ, piano on tracks 5 & 7
- Yuiko Tsubokura – chorus on track 7
