= Romanesque (EP) =

- Cover of the CD version

EP by Buck-Tick
- Released: March 21, 1988
- Recorded: December 1987 – January 1988 at Victor Aoyama Studio in Tokyo; Magnet Studio in Tokyo
- Genre: Power pop; punk rock
- Length: 16:49; 21:49 (CD version)
- Language: Japanese, English
- Label: Victor
- Producer: Buck-Tick

Buck-Tick chronology
| Sexual XXXXX! (1987) | Romanesque (1988) | Seventh Heaven (1988) |

Romanesque is the debut extended play released by the Japanese rock band Buck-Tick. It was released on 12-inch vinyl, cassette and 8 cm CD (which contains a bonus track) on March 21, 1988, through Victor Entertainment. This EP contains a re-recorded version of their song "Romanesque" from their debut album Hurry Up Mode. The extended play peaked at number twenty on the Oricon charts and has sold 40,000 copies worldwide.

== Track listing ==
All music is composed by Hisashi Imai.

| No. | Title | Lyrics | Length |
|---|---|---|---|
| 1. | "Misty Zone" | Atsushi Sakurai | 4:31 |
| 2. | "Romanesque" | Imai | 4:12 |
| 3. | "Automatic Blue" | Imai | 3:09 |
| 4. | "Hearts" | Sakurai | 4:54 |
| Total length: | | | 16:49 |

CD bonus track
| No. | Title | Lyrics | Length |
|---|---|---|---|
| 5. | "Romanesque (Sensual Pleasures Mix)" | Imai | 5:01 |
| Total length: | | | 21:49 |

== Personnel ==
- Atsushi Sakurai – lead vocals, SE
- Hisashi Imai – electric guitar
- Hidehiko Hoshino – electric guitar, gut guitar
- Yutaka Higuchi – bass
- Toll Yagami – drums, sampled percussion

Additional performers

- Julie Fowell – backing vocals on "Romanesque (Sensual Pleasures Mix)"
- Yoko Ueno – sampling operator

Production

- Buck-Tick – producers
- Yasuaki "V" Shindoh – engineer, mixing
- Ken Sakaguchi – cover art, graphic design
- Masafumi Sakamoto – photography

== See also ==
- 1988 in Japanese music
