= Alice in Wonder Underground =

"Alice in Wonder Underground (アリス イン ワンダー アンダーグラウンド)"

Single by Buck-Tick

from the album Tenshi no Revolver
- Released: August 8, 2007
- Genre: Rock
- Length: 9:35
- Label: BMG Japan/Ariola Japan
- Songwriter: Hisashi Imai
- Producer: Buck-Tick

Buck-Tick singles chronology
"Rendezvous" (2007)	"Alice in Wonder Underground (アリス イン ワンダー アンダーグラウンド)" (2007)	"Heaven" (2008)

Alice in Wonder Underground (アリス イン ワンダー アンダーグラウンド) is the twenty-sixth single by the Japanese rock band Buck-Tick, released on August 8, 2007 by BMG Japan.

The single was released in regular and limited edition. On the Oricon Singles Chart peaked at number 18 and charted for 7 weeks.

The title song is lyrical and visual rendition of Lewis Carroll Alice in Wonderland. Despite its "catchy tune with a bright, happy melody", the lyrics are on the contrary very gothic and dark with a memorable chorus "Devil, Angel & Epicurean, let's go!". In some instances, Imai in the background sings some lyrics from the band's previous song "Diabolo".

Music video shows a very "sophisticated", "macabre depiction of the story", with Alice chasing her rabbit, "the band periodically becoming rabbits", and the lead vocalist Atsushi Sakurai dressed as the Mad Hatter.

== Track listing ==
No.	Title	Lyrics	Music	Length
1.	"Alice in Wonder Underground"	Hisashi Imai	Imai	4:07
2.	"Tight Rope"	Atsushi Sakurai	Imai	5:28
Total length:				8:16

== Musicians ==
- Atsushi Sakurai - Voice
- Hisashi Imai - Guitar, backing vocals
- Hidehiko Hoshino - Guitar
- Yutaka Higuchi - Bass
- Toll Yagami - Drums

== See also ==
- Works based on Alice in Wonderland
