= No.0 =

Studio album by Buck-Tick
- Released: March 14, 2018
- Genre: Industrial rock
- Length: 57:28
- Language: Japanese
- Label: Lingua Sounda/Victor Entertainment
- Producer: Buck-Tick

Buck-Tick chronology
Atom Miraiha No.9 (2016)	No.0 (2018)	Abracadabra (2020)

Singles from No.0
- 1. "Babel" Released: November 15, 2017; 2. "Moon Sayonara wo Oshiete" Released: February 21, 2018

No.0 is the twenty-first studio album by Japanese rock band Buck-Tick, released on March 14, 2018 by the label Lingua Sounda, subdivision of the label Victor Entertainment. It peaked 2nd on the Oricon chart, and 5th on Billboard Japan.

Imai said that this would be a "clean break" from what the band has already done, and its keywords are "minimalism" and "electronic". The album was released in three editions: the regular edition, with 13 tracks, the limited edition A and B, with three bonus video clips, and the limited edition C, an exclusive edition that makes the music video clips available in VR format.

== Tracklist ==
All lyrics are written by Atsushi Sakurai, except tracks 8, 9 and 10 that were written by Hisashi Imai; all music is composed by Hisashi Imai, except track 5, 6 and 7 which were composed by Hidehiko Hoshino.

No.	Title	Length
1.	"Reishiki 13-gata "Ai"" (零式13型「愛」)	5:40
2.	"Bishuu Love" (美醜LOVE)	4:44
3.	"Gustave"	4:53
4.	"Moon Sayonara wo Oshiete" (Moon さよならを教えて)	4:58
5.	"Barairo Juujidan - Rosen Kreuzer -" (薔薇色十字団 - Rosen Kreuzer -)	3:01
6.	"Salome - Femme Fatale -" (サロメ - femme fatale -)	3:39
7.	"Ophelia"	4:42
8.	"Hikari no Teikoku" (光の帝国)	3:58
9.	"Nostalgia - Vita Mechanicalis -" (ノスタルジア - ヰタ メカニカリス -)	3:01
10.	"Igniter"	2:37
11.	"Babel"	5:26
12.	"Guernica no Yoru" (ゲルニカの夜)	5:41
13.	"Tainai Kaiki" (胎内回帰)	5:02
Total length:		57:28

Limited Edition A and B Bonus Tracks
No.	Title	Length
1.	"Bishuu Love" (Music Video)	4:44
2.	"Igniter" (Music Video)	2:37
3.	"Ophelia" (Music Video)	4:32

Limited Edition C Bonus Tracks
No.	Title	Length
1.	"Bishuu Love" (VR Music Video)	4:44
2.	"Igniter" (VR Music Video)	2:37
3.	"Ophelia" (VR Music Video)	4:32
4.	"Special VR Viewer"

== Personnel ==
- Atsushi Sakurai - vocal
- Hisashi Imai - lead guitar, vocal
- Hidehiko Hoshino - rhythm guitar
- Yutaka Higuchi - bass guitar
- Toll Yagami - drums
