= Kyokutou I Love You =

Studio album by Buck-Tick
- Released: March 6, 2002
- Recorded: Studio Sunshine, Aobadai Studio, Studio Sound Dali
- Genre: Alternative rock; industrial rock
- Length: 48:06
- Label: BMG/Funhouse
- Producer: Buck-Tick

Buck-Tick chronology
Super Value Buck-Tick (2001)	Kyokutou I Love You (2002)	Mona Lisa Overdrive (2003)

Singles from Kyokutou I Love You
- 1. "21st Cherry Boy" Released: November 21, 2001; 2. "Kyokutou Yori Ai wo Komete" Released: February 20, 2002

Kyokutou I Love You (極東 I Love You, "Far East I Love You") is the 12th album by Buck-Tick, released on March 6, 2002. It reached number twelve on the Oricon chart with 28,770 copies sold. "21st Cherry Boy" contains some lyrics from T.Rex's "20th Century Boy". The album is thematically connected to the next release, Mona Lisa Overdrive: the last instrumental song in Kyokutou I Love You gives the musical foundation to the first song in Mona Lisa Overdrive, while the base of the last song of that album recurs in the first song of Kyokutou I Love You.

== Track listing ==
No.	Title	Lyrics	Music	Length
1.	"Shippuu no Blade Runner" (疾風のブレードランナー)	Imai	Imai	5:57
2.	"21st Cherry Boy"	Sakurai & Imai	Imai	4:34
3.	"Warp Day"	Sakurai	Imai	4:10
4.	"Shanikusai -Carnival-" (謝肉祭-カーニバル-)	Sakurai	Hoshino	4:25
5.	"Trigger"	Sakurai	Imai	3:36
6.	"Long Distance Call"	Sakurai	Imai	5:20
7.	"Kyokutou Yori Ai wo Komete" (極東より愛を込めて)	Sakurai	Imai	4:34
8.	"Ghost"	Sakurai	Imai	3:57
9.	"Brilliant"	Sakurai	Hoshino	2:59
10.	"Oukoku Kingdom Come -Moon Rise-" (王国 Kingdom come-moon rise-)	Sakurai	Imai	5:40
11.	"Continue"	instrumental	Imai	3:00
Total length:				48:06

== Personnel ==
Buck-Tick

- Atsushi Sakurai – vocals
- Hisashi Imai – guitar
- Hidehiko Hoshino – guitar
- Yutaka Higuchi – bass
- Toll Yagami – drums

=== Additional performers ===
- Kazutoshi Yokoyama - manipulate, keyboards and noises

=== Production ===
- Hiromi Yoshizawa - executive producer
