= Arui wa Anarchy =

Studio album by Buck-Tick
- Released: June 4, 2014
- Genre: Neo-psychedelia; dance-rock
- Length: 64:17
- Label: Lingua Sounda/Tokuma Japan

Buck-Tick chronology
Yume Miru Uchuu (2012)	Arui wa Anarchy (2014)	Atom Miraiha No.9 (2016)

Singles from Arui wa Anarchy
- 1. "Keijijo Ryusei" Released: May 14, 2014

Arui wa Anarchy (或いはアナーキー; lit. 'Or Anarchy') is the nineteenth studio album by Japanese rock band Buck-Tick. It was released on June 4, 2014. It finished 4th on the Oricon weekly chart, and also Billboard Japan, with 18,376 copies sold. The album was created with a concept of surrealism and features many references to Dada, Avant-garde, the Cabaret Voltaire and others. According to Hisashi Imai, the title of the album is actually a subtitle only, the main title is a long blank space, indicating that "it is something that cannot be seen, heard, read, or written. Impossible to pronounce. A thing that is not metaphysical."

== Track listing ==
No.	Title	Lyrics	Music	Length
1.	"Dada Disco -G J T H B K H T D-"	Imai	Imai	4:36
2.	"Uchuu Circus" (宇宙サーカス)	Sakurai	Hoshino	3:39
3.	"masQue"	Sakurai	Imai	4:09
4.	"Devil'N Angel"	Imai	Imai	3:49
5.	"Baudelaire de Nemurenai" (ボードレールで眠れない)	Imai	Imai	4:43
6.	"Melancholia" (メランコリア)	Sakurai	Imai	4:56
7.	"Phantom Voltaire"	Sakurai	Imai	4:19
8.	"Survival Dance"	Sakurai	Hoshino	3:33
9.	"Satan" (サタン)	Sakurai	Hoshino	4:25
10.	"Not Found"	Imai	Imai	4:34
11.	"Sekai wa Yami de Michite Iru" (世界は闇で満ちている)	Imai	Imai	5:11
12.	"Once Upon a Time"	Imai	Imai	4:50
13.	"Mudai" (無題)	Sakurai	Imai	5:35
14.	"Keijijou Ryuusei -Metaform-" (形而上 流星-metaform-)	Sakurai	Imai	5:58
Total length:				64:17

== Personnel ==
Buck-Tick

- Atsushi Sakurai – vocals
- Hisashi Imai – guitar
- Hidehiko Hoshino – guitar, keyboards
- Yutaka Higuchi – bass
- Toll Yagami – drums
