= Zangai =

Single by Buck-Tick

from the album Mona Lisa Overdrive
- Released: January 8, 2003
- Genre: Electronic, rock
- Length: 8:16
- Label: BMG Japan
- Songwriter(s): Hisashi Imai, Atsushi Sakurai
- Producer(s): Buck-Tick

Buck-Tick singles chronology
"Kyokuto Yori Ai no Komete" (2002)	"Zangai" (2003)	"Genso no Hana" (2003)

"Zangai" (残骸) (lit. Ruins) is the twenty-first single by the Japanese rock band Buck-Tick, released on January 8, 2003. It reached 5th position at Oricon Singles Chart, staying on chart for seven weeks.

== Track listing ==
#	Title	Length	Lyrics	Music
1	"Zangai"	4:33	Atsushi Sakurai	Hisashi Imai
2	"Girl"	4:58	Hisashi Imai	Hisashi Imai

== Personnel ==
- Atsushi Sakurai - vocals
- Hisahi Imai - main guitar
- Hidehiko Hoshino - guitar
- Yutaka Higuchi - bass
- Toll Yagami - drums
- Kazutoshi Yokoyama - keyboard
