= Cosmos (Buck-Tick album) =

Studio album by Buck-Tick
- Released: 21 June 1996; 19 September 2002 (digital remaster); 5 September 2007 (remaster)
- Recorded: March–April 1996 at Sound Sky Kawana in Tokyo; Victor Studio in Tokyo
- Genres: Industrial rock, alternative rock
- Length: 49:50
- Languages: Japanese, English
- Label: Victor
- Producers: Koniyang and Buck-Tick

Buck-Tick chronology
Six/Nine (1995)	Cosmos (1996)	Sexy Stream Liner (1997)

Singles from Cosmos
- 1. "Candy" Released: 22 May 1996

Cosmos is the ninth studio album by the Japanese rock band Buck-Tick. The album was released on June 21, 1996, through Victor Entertainment. It was the group's last album released through Victor and peaked at number six on the Oricon charts. Cosmos has sold 130,000 copies within two weeks. The album was digitally remastered and re-released on September 19, 2002, with two bonus tracks. It was remastered and re-released again on September 5, 2007. The song "Tight Rope" was later re-recorded as the b-side to the group's "Alice in Wonder Underground" single in 2007, and "Sane" was re-recorded in 2012 for their "Elise no Tame ni" single. The album was heavily influenced by electronic music, as the band started gravitating towards cyberpunk music.

== Track listing ==
All lyrics are written by Atsushi Sakurai, except where noted; all music is composed by Hisashi Imai, except where noted.

No.	Title	Length
1.	"Maria"	3:52
2.	"Candy" (キャンディ)	4:23
3.	"Chocolate" (チョコレート; music written by Hidehiko Hoshino)	4:05
4.	"Sane"	4:34
5.	"Tight Rope"	5:16
6.	"Idol"	4:58
7.	"Living on the Net" (lyrics written by Imai)	4:07
8.	"Foolish"	3:59
9.	"In" (music written by Hoshino)	4:31
10.	"Ash-ra"	5:09
11.	"Cosmos"	5:01
Total length:		49:50

2002 digital remaster bonus tracks
No.	Title	Length
12.	"Candy" (single version)	4:23
13.	"Chocolate" (single version; music written by Hoshino)	4:05

== Personnel ==
- Atsushi Sakurai - lead vocals
- Hisashi Imai - lead guitar, backing vocals
- Hidehiko Hoshino - rhythm guitar, keyboards, backing vocals
- Yutaka Higuchi - bass
- Toll Yagami - drums

Additional performers

- Kazutoshi Yokoyama - piano, backing vocals

Production

- Koniyang - producer, recording, mixing, mastering
- Buck-Tick - producers
- Takafumi Muraki; Naoki Toyoshima - executive producers
- Shinichi Ishizuka - mixing
- Hitoshi Hiruma; Takahiro Uchida - engineers
- Kenichi Araki; Akinori Kaizaki; Hiroshi Tanigawa; Masanobu Murakami; Naoki Ibaraki; Mikiro Yamada - assistant engineers
- Ken Sakaguchi - cover art, graphic design
- Nicci Keller; Alan Solon - photography

== Notes ==
1. * The only song that Shinichi Ishizuka mixed and that Koniyang did not mix was "Chocolate".
