= Sexy Stream Liner =

Studio album by Buck-Tick
- Released: December 10, 1997
- Recorded: Sound Sky Studio, Eggs & Shep Studio
- Genre: Industrial rock; electropunk
- Length: 54:48
- Label: Mercury
- Producer: Buck-Tick

Buck-Tick chronology
Cosmos (1996)	Sexy Stream Liner (1997)	LTD (1998)

Singles from Sexy Stream Liner
- 1. "Heroin" Released: November 12, 1997; 2. "Sasayaki" Released: March 11, 1998

Sexy Stream Liner is the tenth album by Buck-Tick, their first on Mercury Music Entertainment, released on December 10, 1997. It reached number four on the Oricon chart with 78,820 copies sold. Starting with this album, Hisashi Imai started using the theremin in their sound. Like their previous album, Sexy Stream Liner is very influenced by the cyberpunk subculture.

== Track listing ==
No.	Title	Lyrics	Music	Length
1.	"Thanatos" (タナトス)	Sakurai	Imai	5:25
2.	"Sexy Stream Liner"		Imai	2:45
3.	"Heroin -Angel Dust Mix-" (= ヒロイン-angel dust mix-)	Sakurai	Imai	4:31
4.	"Muchi no Namida" (無知の涙)	Sakurai	Imai	4:39
5.	"Lizard Skin no Shoujo" (リザードスキンの少女)	Imai	Imai	4:36
6.	"Rasen Mushi" (螺旋 虫)	Sakurai	Hoshino	4:33
7.	"Chouchou" (蝶蝶)	Sakurai	Hoshino	4:34
8.	"Sasayaki" (囁き)	Sakurai	Imai	4:39
9.	"Kalavinka" (迦陵頻伽 Kalavinka)	Sakurai	Imai	5:11
10.	"My Fuckin' Valentine"	Imai	Imai	4:38
11.	"Schiz.o Gensou" (Schiz.o幻想)	Sakurai	Imai	4:25
12.	"Kimi ga Shin... Dara" (キミガシン...ダラ)	Sakurai	Imai	5:11
Total length:				54:48

== Personnel ==
=== Buck-Tick ===
- Atsushi Sakurai - vocal
- Hisashi Imai - electric guitar, vocal on track 10
- Hidehiko Hoshino - rhythm guitar
- Yutaka Higuchi - bass guitar
- Toll Yagami - drums

=== Additional musicians ===
- Kazutoshi Yokoyama - manipulation, keyboard
