= Sexual XXXXX! =

Studio album by Buck-Tick
- Released: November 21, 1987
- Recorded: July 26–August 18, 1987 at Avaco Creative Studio in Tokyo; Star Ship Studio in Osaka; Victor Aoyama Studio in Tokyo
- Genre: Punk rock; power pop
- Length: 42:56
- Language: Japanese, English
- Label: Victor
- Producer: Buck-Tick

Buck-Tick chronology
Hurry Up Mode (1987)	Sexual XXXXX! (1987)	Seventh Heaven (1988)

Sexual XXXXX! (stylized as SEXUAL×××××! and read as simply "sexual") is the second studio album by the Japanese rock band Buck-Tick, released as their major label debut by Victor Entertainment on November 21, 1987. It peaked at number 33 on the Oricon Albums Chart.

== Overview ==
Following the album-release concert for Hurry Up Mode at Toshima Public Hall on April 1, 1987, major record labels began courting Buck-Tick, but the band wanted to continue pursuing music on their own terms and refused to sign unless the label would agree to their four conditions: first, that the band would be able to make their own decisions about their hair, makeup, clothing, and general image; second, that they would never be forced to change the band lineup; third, that they would never be forced to use session musicians for recordings; and last, that they would be able to do all of their own production work. Most record companies refused the idea of accepting such demands from a new band, but Junichi Tanaka of Victor Invitation Records decided to accept their terms, and Takeshi Takagaki of Victor Invitation offered them the company's Aoyama studio as a place to practice.

The recording of Sexual XXXXX! took place from July 26 to August 18, 1987. It was released on vinyl, cassette and CD by Victor on November 21, 1987. Initially, the album was to be titled "SEXUAL INTERCOURSE", but that was felt to be too straightforward.

The songs "Do the I Love You" and "Hyper Love" were later re-recorded for the band's 1992 compilation album Koroshi no Shirabe: This Is Not Greatest Hits. "My Eyes & Your Eyes" was re-recorded for the b-side to their 2007 single "Rendezvous". Sexual XXXXX! was digitally remastered and re-released on September 19, 2002, with a different cover. It was remastered and re-released again on September 5, 2007.

== Reception ==
Sexual XXXXX! peaked at number 33 on the Oricon Albums Chart. Although a good result for a new band, the album was not well-received and the group also faced accusations of "selling out". As of 2011, it had sold 40,000 copies.

== Track listing ==
All tracks are written by Hisashi Imai, except where noted.

No.	Title	Length
1.	"Empty Girl"	3:36
2.	"Future for Future"	3:52
3.	"Dream or Truth"	4:23
4.	"Do the I Love You"	2:56
5.	"Illusion" (lyrics written by Atsushi Sakurai)	6:19
6.	"Sexual XXXXX!" (lyrics written by Sakurai)	3:33
7.	"Sissy Boy"	4:26
8.	"Mis-Cast"	3:35
9.	"Hyper Love"	5:03
10.	"My Eyes & Your Eyes"	4:54
Total length:		42:56

2002 digital remaster bonus tracks
No.	Title	Length
11.	"Romanesque (Note: Originally released on the compilation album BT in 1999.)" (Demo version)	4:04
12.	"Sexual XXXXX!" (live from Climax Together on September 11, 1992; lyrics written by Sakurai)	3:49

== Personnel ==
- Atsushi Sakurai - lead vocals
- Hisashi Imai - lead guitar, backing vocals
- Hidehiko Hoshino - rhythm guitar, acoustic guitar, backing vocals
- Yutaka Higuchi - bass
- Toll Yagami - drums

Additional performers

- Tsutomu Nakayama - keyboards, backing vocals
- Jun-ichi Tanaka - backing vocals

Production

- Buck-Tick - producers
- Kazumitsu Higuchi; Kazuo Sawaki - executive producers
- Shuuji Yamaguchi - engineer, mixing
- Hideaki Ikeda; Kouki Fukui - assistant engineers
- Katsunori Miyake - graphic design, cover art
- Masanori Kato - photography

== See also ==
- 1987 in Japanese music
