= Mona Lisa Overdrive (album) =

Studio album by Buck-Tick
- Released: February 13, 2003
- Recorded: Studio Sound Dali, Aobadai Studio, Heart Beat Recording Studio, Landmark Studio
- Genre: Alternative rock; industrial rock
- Length: 48:16
- Label: BMG/Funhouse
- Producer: Buck-Tick

Buck-Tick chronology
| Kyokutou I Love You (2002) | Mona Lisa Overdrive (2003) | At the Night Side (2004) |

Singles from Mona Lisa Overdrive
- 1. "Zangai" Released: January 18, 2003

Mona Lisa Overdrive is the 13th album by Buck-Tick, released on February 13, 2003. The album title is mistakenly thought to have been inspired by William Gibson's cyberpunk novel of the same name but guitarist Hisashi Imai originally confused it with Robert Longo's work Samurai Overdrive, which inspired the album title. It reached number seven on the Oricon chart with 31,235 copies sold. The album is thematically connected to the previous release, Kyokutou I Love You: the last instrumental song in Kyokutou I Love You gives the musical foundation to the first song in Mona Lisa Overdrive, while the base of the last song of this album recurs in the first song of Kyokutou I Love You.

== Track listing ==
| No. | Title | Lyrics | Music | Length |
|---|---|---|---|---|
| 1. | "Nakayubi" (ナカユビ) | Imai | Imai | 3:34 |
| 2. | "Buster" | Imai | Imai | 3:50 |
| 3. | "Zangai -Shape 2-" (残骸-Shape2-) | Sakurai | Imai | 3:52 |
| 4. | "Limbo" | Sakurai | Imai | 4:23 |
| 5. | "Mona Lisa" | Imai | Imai | 4:32 |
| 6. | "Girl -Shape 2-" | Imai | Imai | 4:26 |
| 7. | "Sid Vicious on the Beach" | Imai | Imai | 4:29 |
| 8. | "Black Cherry" | Sakurai & Hoshino | Hoshino | 3:53 |
| 9. | "Genzai" (原罪) | Sakurai | Imai | 2:39 |
| 10. | "Monster" | Sakurai | Hoshino | 4:01 |
| 11. | "Ai no Uta" (愛ノ歌) | Sakurai | Imai | 4:53 |
| 12. | "Continuous" | instrumental | Imai | 3:43 |

== Personnel ==
Buck-Tick

- Atsushi Sakurai – vocals
- Hisashi Imai – guitar, vocals (lead on "Sid Vicious on the Beach")
- Hidehiko Hoshino – guitar
- Yutaka Higuchi – bass
- Toll Yagami – drums
