= To-Search =

Single by Buck-Tick
- Released: October 21, 1986
- Recorded: May 16, 1986 at Yamaha Hiyoshi Center Studio in Hiyoshi, Kyoto
- Genre: Punk rock
- Length: 4:59
- Label: Taiyo (LEO 007)
- Songwriter: Hisashi Imai
- Producer: Buck-Tick

Buck-Tick singles chronology
"To-Search" (1986)	"Just One More Kiss" (1988)

"To-Search" is the debut single by the Japanese rock band Buck-Tick. It was released on October 21, 1986 through the independent label Taiyo Records with the catalog number LEO 007. "To-Search" peaked at number 6 on the Japanese Indie Singles chart. The single's b-side, "Plastic Syndrome Type-2", was later featured on the group's debut studio album Hurry Up Mode in 1987, while "To-Search" was later released as the b-side to the "Just One More Kiss" single in 1988.

== Track listing ==
Side A
No.	Title	Lyrics	Music	Length
1.	"To-Search"	Hisashi Imai	Imai	4:59

Side B
No.	Title	Lyrics	Music	Length
1.	"Plastic Syndrome Type-2"	Imai	Atsushi Sakurai	3:33

== Personnel ==
- Atsushi Sakurai - lead vocals
- Hisashi Imai - lead guitar
- Hidehiko Hoshino - rhythm guitar
- Yutaka Higuchi - bass
- Toll Yagami - drums

Production

- Buck-Tick - producers
- Mamoru Tsukada - cover photo
- Tomoyo Tanaka - cover design

== See also ==
- 1986 in Japanese music

== Notes ==
1. * In the liner notes, Imai is incorrectly credited as Kotobuki Imai.
