= Seventh Heaven (Buck-Tick album) =

Studio album by Buck-Tick
- Released: June 21, 1988; September 19, 2002 (digital remaster); September 5, 2007 (remaster)
- Recorded: February–April 1988 at Onkio Haus in Ginza, Tokyo; Sound Atelie in Osaka
- Genre: Power pop; post-punk
- Length: 40:45
- Language: Japanese, English
- Label: Victor
- Producer: Buck-Tick

Buck-Tick chronology
Sexual XXXXX! (1987)	Seventh Heaven (1988)	Taboo (1989)

Seventh Heaven is the third studio album by the Japanese rock band Buck-Tick. It was released on vinyl, cassette and CD on June 21, 1988, through Victor Entertainment, and has been certified gold by the RIAJ for sales over 100,000 copies. The album was digitally remastered and re-released on September 19, 2002, with two bonus tracks. It was remastered and re-released again on September 5, 2007. The lyrics for "Physical Neurose" mention Gregor Samsa, the main character of Franz Kafka's The Metamorphosis. "...In Heaven...", "Oriental Love Story" and "Victims of Love" were later re-recorded for the group's compilation album Koroshi no Shirabe: This Is Not Greatest Hits (1992). Seventh Heaven peaked at number three on the Oricon charts, and 1st on the LP chart; it has sold 110,000 copies.

== Track listing ==
All lyrics are written by Atsushi Sakurai, except where noted; all music is composed by Hisashi Imai, except where noted.

No.	Title	Length
1.	"Fragile Article" (Instrumental)	1:22
2.	"...In Heaven..."	3:52
3.	"Capsule Tears -Plastic Syndrome III-" (lyrics written by Imai)	4:45
4.	"Castle in the Air" (lyrics written by Imai)	4:29
5.	"Oriental Love Story"	6:26
6.	"Physical Neurose" (lyrics written by Imai)	2:56
7.	"Desperate Girl" (music written by Hidehiko Hoshino)	3:20
8.	"Victims of Love"	4:26
9.	"Memories..."	3:49
10.	"Seventh Heaven" (lyrics written by Imai)	5:12
Total length:		40:45

2002 digital remaster bonus tracks
No.	Title	Length
11.	"Sexual Intercourse" (original version of "Sexual XXXXX!")	3:29
12.	"...In Heaven..."/"Moonlight" (live from Climax Together on September 11, 1992)	7:41

== Personnel ==
- Atsushi Sakurai - lead vocals
- Hisashi Imai - lead guitar, backing vocals
- Hidehiko Hoshino - rhythm guitar, acoustic guitar, backing vocals
- Yutaka Higuchi - bass
- Toll Yagami - drums

Additional performers

- Ken Morioka - keyboards

Production

- Buck-Tick - producers
- Yasuaki "V" Shindoh - engineer, mixing
- Ken Sakaguchi - graphic design, cover art
- Hisashi Imai - booklet design
- Kazuhiro Kitaoka - photography

== See also ==
- 1988 in Japanese music
