= Hurry Up Mode =

Studio album by Buck-Tick
- Released: April 1, 1987
- Recorded: May 18, 1986-January 1987 at Yamaha Hiyoshi Center Studio in Nakahara-ku, Kawasaki
- Genre: Punk rock
- Length: 44:05; 50:45 (CD version)
- Language: Japanese, English
- Label: Taiyo (LEO 009)
- Producer: Sawaki and Buck-Tick

Buck-Tick chronology
Hurry Up Mode (1987)	Sexual XXXXX! (1987)

Hurry Up Mode is the debut studio album by the Japanese rock band Buck-Tick, released by Taiyo Records on April 1, 1987. The entire album was remixed and re-released in 1990; see Hurry Up Mode (1990 Mix).

== Background and recording ==
Through their drummer Toll Yagami's contacts, Buck-Tick began recording material at Yamaha Hiyoshi Center Studio in May 1986. In July, they attracted the attention of Kazuo Sawaki, head of the independent label Taiyo Records. He had seen the band perform at a live house called Shinjuku Attic, and had been very impressed. Buck-Tick signed to Taiyo immediately and released their debut single, "To-Search", on October 21 of the same year. Recording sessions for a full-length album then began, and the band recorded 13 songs over approximately 100 hours in just two weeks.

With Sawaki's help they began promoting themselves very actively, playing the live house circuit in Tokyo. On April 1, 1987, the band released Hurry Up Mode as their first album. It was released on both vinyl and CD by Taiyo Records, with the catalog number LEO 009. The CD version merges "Prologue" into "Plastic Syndrome Type II" as one track, and had two bonus tracks, "Vacuum Dream" and "No No Boy". The album is subtitled "Koroshi no Shirabe" (殺シノ調ベ; "Songs of Murder"), which the band would later reuse as the title of their 1992 self-cover album Koroshi no Shirabe: This Is Not Greatest Hits.

In conjunction with the album's release, they played a concert titled Buck-Tick Phenomenon at Toshima Public Hall in Ikebukuro that same day. The band used an advertising strategy that involved pasting thousands of eye-catching, black-and-white sticker advertisements all over Tokyo's hip youth districts that read simply "Buck-Tick Phenomenon April 1st Toshima Public Hall". The strategy worked, as Buck-Tick sold 400 tickets in advance, and another 400 on the day of the show. After this success, major labels began to be interested in the band. Junichi Tanaka, who attended the concert, signed Buck-Tick to Victor Invitation Records and released their second album, Sexual XXXXX!, that November.

Hurry Up Mode was later remixed and re-released in 1990, excluding the two bonus tracks (see Hurry Up Mode (1990 Mix)). The song "Moonlight" was later re-recorded for 1992's Koroshi no Shirabe: This Is Not Greatest Hits.

== Reception ==
Professional ratings
Review scores
Source	Rating
Allmusic	3.5/5 stars

Hurry Up Mode topped the Japanese Indie Albums chart. Reviewing the album for Allmusic, Alexey Eremenko wrote that on Hurry Up Mode Buck-Tick "rip through a set of speedy, sunny, and energetic tunes, riding the power of reverb guitars and those unforgettable '80s big drumbeats," but with a punk vigor. Although noting it to be a "musical artifact" of its time, Eremenko praised the album's catchiness, particularly the "addictive" chorus of the title track." Motohiro Makaino of Re:minder described "Fly High" as showcasing Hisashi Imai's meticulously crafted melody lines, "For Dangerous Kids" as featuring a ska rhythm, and noted "Romanesque" features reversed drum cymbals.

== Track listing ==
All tracks are written by Hisashi Imai, except where noted.

Side A
No.	Title	Length
1.	"Prologue" (instrumental, music written by Atsushi Sakurai)	0:41
2.	"Plastic Syndrome Type II" (music written by Sakurai)	3:33
3.	"Hurry Up Mode"	4:09
4.	"Telephone Murder"	3:46
5.	"Fly High"	4:34
6.	"One Night Ballet"	5:07

Side B
No.	Title	Length
1.	"Moonlight" (lyrics written by Sakurai)	3:49
2.	"For Dangerous Kids"	4:23
3.	"Romanesque"	4:01
4.	"Secret Reaction"	5:03
5.	"Stay Gold"	4:39
Total length:		44:05

=== CD ===
No.	Title	Length
1.	"Plastic Syndrome Type II" ( (Note: The CD version of the album merges "Prologue", which is labelled as track one on the vinyl version, into "Plastic Syndrome Type II" as one track, and does not mention "Prologue".)music written by Sakurai)	4:14
2.	"Hurry Up Mode"	4:09
3.	"Telephone Murder"	3:46
4.	"Fly High"	4:34
5.	"One Night Ballet"	5:07
6.	"Vacuum Dream"	3:16
7.	"No No Boy"	3:20
8.	"Moonlight" (lyrics written by Sakurai)	3:49
9.	"For Dangerous Kids"	4:23
10.	"Romanesque"	4:01
11.	"Secret Reaction"	5:03
12.	"Stay Gold"	4:39
Total length:		50:45

== Personnel ==
- Atsushi Sakurai - lead vocals
- Hisashi Imai - lead guitar, backing vocals
- Hidehiko Hoshino - rhythm guitar, backing vocals
- Yutaka Higuchi - bass
- Toll Yagami - drums

Additional performers

- Kosuzu Yokomachi; Mariko Ohhira - backing vocals
- Hiromi Kokubu - piano

Production

- Sawaki; Buck-Tick - producers
- Masayuki Minato; Nishimura - engineers, mixing
- Tomoyo Tanaka - cover art
- Mamoru Tsukada - photography

== See also ==
- 1987 in Japanese music
