= Juusankai wa Gekkou =

Studio album by Buck-Tick
- Released: April 5, 2005
- Recorded: Studio Sound Dali, Aobadai Studio, Prime Sound Studio Form, Victor Studio
- Genre: Gothic rock
- Length: 68:17
- Label: BMG Funhouse
- Producer: Buck-Tick

Buck-Tick chronology
At the Night Side (2004)	Juusankai wa Gekkou (2005)	Catalogue 2005 (2005)

Singles from Juusankai wa Gekkou
- 1. "Romance" Released: March 2, 2005

Professional ratings
Review scores
Source	Rating
Allmusic	3/5 stars

Juusankai wa Gekkou (十三階は月光; "13th Floor with Moonlight") is the fourteenth album by Japanese rock band Buck-Tick, released on April 5, 2005.

The limited edition came with a DVD of the music video for the album's only single, "Romance". It reached number four on the Oricon chart with 28,104 copies sold.

== Overview ==
For Juusankai wa Gekkou the band deliberately adopted a Gothic theme, which is presented throughout the album. As vocalist Atsushi Sakurai is fond of the theme, he found it easy to work with and wrote the lyrics for all the songs except one. Guitarist Hisashi Imai actually thought of the idea during the tour for their previous album, but was further resolved to do it after watching Sakurai's solo performances.

The songs "Cabaret" and "Doll" have lines sung in female vocabulary and grammar, while "Doukeshi A" is from the perspective of a pierrot.

== Track listing ==
All lyrics are written by Atsushi Sakurai except where noted; all music is composed by Hisashi Imai except where noted.

No.	Title	Length
1.	"Enter Clown" (instrumental)	3:17
2.	"Kourin" (降臨)	5:28
3.	"Doukeshi A" (道化師A)	3:54
4.	"Cabaret" (music by Hidehiko Hoshino)	4:23
5.	"Ijin no Yoru" (異人の夜) (music by Hoshino)	4:13
6.	"Clown Loves Señorita" (instrumental)	1:58
7.	"Goblin"	4:07
8.	"Alive"	4:09
9.	"Gesshoku" (月蝕)	4:42
10.	"Lullaby II" (instrumental)	1:49
11.	"Doll"	4:13
12.	"Passion" (music by Hoshino)	5:15
13.	"13byou" (13秒) (instrumental)	0:14
14.	"Romance -Incubo-"	4:35
15.	"Seraphim" (lyrics by Imai)	3:15
16.	"Muma - The Nightmare" (夢魔-The Nightmare)	5:53
17.	"Diabolo -Lucifer-"	3:53
18.	"Who's Clown?" (instrumental)	2:59

== Personnel ==
Buck-Tick

- Atsushi Sakurai – vocals
- Hisashi Imai – guitar, noise, electronics, chorus
- Hidehiko Hoshino – guitar, chorus
- Yutaka Higuchi – bass
- Toll Yagami – drums

Additional performers

- Kazutoshi Yokoyama – manipulator, synthesizer, piano, organ, celesta and noises
