= Izora (album) =

Studio album by Buck-Tick
- Released: April 12, 2023
- Studio: Victor Studio, Studio Sound Dali, Prime Sound Studio Form
- Genre: Alternative rock
- Length: 53:13
- Language: Japanese
- Label: Lingua Sounda/Victor
- Producer: Buck-Tick

Buck-Tick chronology
Abracadabra (2020)	Izora (2023)	Subrosa (2024)

Singles from Izora
- 1. "Taiyou to Ikaros" Released: March 8, 2023; 2. "Mugen Loop" Released: March 22, 2023

Izora (異空) is the twenty-third studio album by the Japanese rock band Buck-Tick. It was released on April 12, 2023. The album peaked at the 2nd position on the Oricon Albums Chart and is the band's first Top 3 album on Billboard Japan Hot Albums chart. Its charting success makes it a rare example for such a long-lasting band and their "will and persistence" on the Japanese music scene. It is the last album featuring lead singer Atsushi Sakurai, who died on October 19, 2023.

== Release ==
It is the band's first studio album in three years. It was released on April 12, 2023, by Lingua Sounda/Victor in regular edition on CD, cassette, Vinyl and in limited edition A (with Blu-ray) and B (DVD), as well as digital download and streaming.

Singles "Taiyou to Ikaros" (titled "太陽とイカロス") and "Mugen Loop" (titled "無限 Loop") were released on March 8 and 22 respectively.

The song "Sayonara Shelter" was previously released in September 2022 on compilation album Catalogue The Best 35th Anniv., inspired by a Ukrainian girl singing "Let It Go" during the Russian invasion of Ukraine.

== Chart performance ==
The album peaked at the 2nd position on the Oricon Albums Chart with over 17 thousand copies sold and charted for 10 weeks. On the Oricon Rock Albums Chart also charted at 2nd place. It is band's first Top 3 album on Billboard Japan Hot Albums chart.

Singles "Taiyou to Ikaros" and "Mugen Loop" both charted at 10th position on the Oricon Singles Chart. "Mugen Loop" also peaked at 2nd place on the Oricon Rock Singles Chart. Both singles did not chart on the Billboard Japan Hot 100, but on Top Singles Sales peaked on 12th and 14th position.

== Promotion ==
The release of the album was quickly followed by a nationwide tour in Japan with over 20 concerts in 18 locations, originally scheduled to end with FishTankers Only (fan club) concerts on September 17 and 18 at Gunma Music Center in Gunma prefecture, not far from their small hometown of Fujioka. To allow their fanbase located too far away in Japan and other countries to enjoy their live concert, those with "W" fan memberships could buy tickets to stream the live house show held on September 18, 2023. In August 2023 additional live tours were announced with eight dates from October 20 until December 9, 2023. With the sudden death of lead singer Atsushi Sakurai on October 19, 2023, additional tours were canceled.

== Track listing ==
No.	Title	Lyrics	Music	Length
1.	"Quantum I"		Imai	2:03
2.	"Scarecrow"	Sakurai	Imai	3:52
3.	"Valkyrie no Kikō" (ワルキューレの騎行)	Sakurai	Imai	4:33
4.	"Sayonara Shelter Destroy and Regenerate - Mix" (さよならシェルター destroy and regenerate-Mix)	Sakurai	Hoshino	5:02
5.	"Ai no Harem" (愛のハレム)	Sakurai	Hoshino	4:06
6.	"Campanella Hanataba o Kimi ni" (Campanella 花束を君に)	Sakurai	Imai	3:13
7.	"The Falling Down"	Imai	Imai	3:09
8.	"Taiyou to Ikaros" (太陽とイカロス)	Sakurai	Hoshino	4:29
9.	"Boogie Woogie"	Sakurai	Imai	3:57
10.	"Mugen Loop -Izora-" (無限 LOOP -IZORA-)	Sakurai	Imai	4:16
11.	"Noraneko Blue" (野良猫ブルー)	Sakurai	Imai	3:37
12.	"Hizumi" (ヒズミ)	Sakurai	Imai	3:38
13.	"Na mo Naki Watashi" (名も無きわたし)	Sakurai	Imai	4:12
14.	"Quantum II"		Imai	3:01
Total length:				53:13

== Personnel ==
=== Buck-Tick ===
- Atsushi Sakurai – lead vocals
- Hisashi Imai – guitars, theremin, vocals
- Hidehiko Hoshino – guitars, keyboards
- Yutaka Higuchi – bass guitar
- Toll Yagami – drums, percussion

=== Production ===
- Junichi Tanaka – co-producing
- Yokohama Kazutoshi – editing
- Clemens Schleiwies – mastering
- Hitoshi Hiruma – mixing, recording
- Yow-Row – synthesizer (#3, #8)
- Kazunori Akita – artwork
