= SuperValu =

SuperValu is a name used by grocery chains in multiple countries:

- SuperValu (Canada)
- SuperValu (Ireland) (also operating in Spain)
- SuperValu (United States)

== See also ==
- IGA Supermarkets, an Australian chain of supermarkets. Some of the store also using SuperValu as sub-brand
- SuperValue, a New Zealand supermarket chain
- Super Value Buck-Tick, an industrial rock album
