= Taboo (Buck-Tick album) =

Studio album by Buck-Tick
- Released: January 18, 1989
- Recorded: September 2–October 1, 1988 at Master Rock Studios in London, England
- Genres: Gothic rock; post-punk
- Length: 42:41
- Languages: Japanese, English
- Label: Victor
- Producers: Owen Paul and Buck-Tick

Buck-Tick chronology
Seventh Heaven (1988)	Taboo (1989)	Aku no Hana (1990)

Singles from Taboo
- 1. "Just One More Kiss" Released: October 26, 1988

Taboo is the fourth studio album by the Japanese rock band Buck-Tick, released by Victor Entertainment on January 18, 1989. It topped the Oricon Albums Chart and has sold over 300,000 copies. The album has been remastered and reissued twice; in 2002, with two bonus tracks, and 2007.

== Overview ==
Buck-Tick recorded the album in a single month in London in the fall of 1988, with Owen Paul as producer. They also had a gig at the Greyhound Club, which the members of Der Zibet also attended. London made a lasting impression on Buck-Tick, especially Sakurai Atsushi, who felt that the local music scene was more accepting of darker, more serious music than the Japanese one. The album marks a turn in the band's career towards a darker style.

Taboo was released on cassette, CD and as a two-record vinyl set (one is a blank picture disc) on January 18, 1989, by Victor Entertainment. On March 22, 1989, the band started the album's tour. It was at this point that the members had stopped putting their hair up extensively, and vocalist Atsushi Sakurai also gave up on dyeing his. The tour was scheduled to run to the end of May, but was cancelled abruptly when guitarist Hisashi Imai was arrested for LSD possession in April. Buck-Tick went on hiatus. Imai was given a suspended sentence, and the band's agency was flooded with fan letters pleading for them not to disband. They held a press conference in July, where the band announced that Buck-Tick is the five members, and that none of them could be replaced.

The band re-recorded "Angelic Conversation" for the b-side of their 1991 single "M・A・D". "Just One More Kiss", "Iconoclasm" and "Taboo" were re-recorded for the 1992 compilation album Koroshi no Shirabe: This Is Not Greatest Hits. Taboo was digitally remastered and re-released on CD on September 19, 2002, with two bonus tracks, and again on September 5, 2007.

== Reception ==
Taboo topped the Oricon Albums Chart, selling 298,620 copies in its first year of release. It has sold over 300,000 in total.

Ikuto Hirose of Re:minder wrote that Taboo sees the band boldly shift away from the catchy, 8-beat rock of their earlier work and invent "dark new wave". He considers the live staple "Iconoclasm", with its guitar intro played on a single string, single-phrase bassline repeating endlessly, and English lyrics "murmured like an incantation", to be the band's signature song. He noted that although the album closer "Just One More Kiss" might seem out of place due to its catchiness and complete tonal shift, its lyrics are full of decadent phrases, thereby following the same themes as the other nine tracks; "The ability to successfully reconcile darkness with catchiness may well be regarded as Buck-Tick's greatest artistic innovation."

"Iconoclasm" was covered by J for the Buck-Tick tribute album, Parade -Respective Tracks of Buck-Tick- (2005).

== Track listing ==
All lyrics are written by Atsushi Sakurai, except where noted; all music is composed by Hisashi Imai, except where noted.

No.	Title	Length
1.	"Iconoclasm" (lyrics written by Imai)	3:01
2.	"Tokyo"	4:23
3.	"Sex for You"	4:14
4.	"Embryo"	3:59
5.	"J" (lyrics written by Imai)	4:25
6.	"Feast of Demoralization" (lyrics written by Toll Yagami; music written by Hidehiko Hoshino)	4:18
7.	"Angelic Conversation" (lyrics written by Imai)	5:41
8.	"Silent Night"	3:26
9.	"Taboo"	3:59
10.	"Just One More Kiss"	5:03
Total length:		42:41

2002 digital remaster bonus tracks
No.	Title	Length
11.	"Just One More Kiss" (live from Climax Together on September 11, 1992)	5:12
12.	"To-Search" (lyrics written by Imai)	5:01

== Personnel ==
- Atsushi Sakurai - lead vocals
- Hisashi Imai - lead guitar, backing vocals
- Hidehiko Hoshino - rhythm guitar, acoustic guitar, backing vocals
- Yutaka Higuchi - bass
- Toll Yagami - drums, percussion

Additional performers

- Philip Hoeger - keyboards

Production

- Owen Paul - producer
- Buck-Tick - producers
- Will Gosling; Roland Herrington; Mark Dearnley; Junko Yamazaki; Shuuji Yamaguchi - engineers, mixing
- Kenshi Kajiwara - assistant engineer
- Ken Sakaguchi - graphic design, cover art
- Kazuhiro Kitaoka - photography

== See also ==
- 1989 in Japanese music

== Notes ==
1. * The only song that Buck-Tick produced is "Just One More Kiss".
2. * Released as the b-side to the "Just One More Kiss" single. Originally released as its own single in 1986.
