= Schwein =

Band

Schwein (German for pig as well as pork) was a music group comprising members of Buck-Tick, KMFDM, and PIG. Members Raymond Watts (PIG; vocals, programming, guitar) and Hisashi Imai (Buck-Tick; guitar and noise), both having worked together in Schaft, were joined by Atsushi Sakurai (Buck-Tick; vocals), Sascha Konietzko (KMFDM; vocals and programming) and Lucia Cifarelli (KMFDM; vocals).

In 2001 Schwein released an album, Schweinstein, which peaked at number 18 on Oricon's album chart, followed by the remix album Son of Schweinstein. Schwein toured Japan in the summer of 2001. However, Konietzko did not tour with them, citing illness and a desire to focus on KMFDM. In an extensive 2023 interview for Visual Music Japan (VMJ) with Mandah Frénot, Raymond Watts talked about the project and cited Schwein as his favorite collaboration to date and called Sakurai a "grand vocalist".

== Discography ==
=== Studio album ===
Schweinstein (May 9, 2001)
No.	Title	Lyrics	Music	Length
1.	"You're My Disease"	Sascha Konietzko/Atsushi Sakurai/Lucia Cifarelli	Sascha Konietzko/Lucia Cifarelli	4:18
2.	"Crown"	Raymond Watts	Hisashi Imai	3:26
3.	"Spank the Monkey"	Raymond Watts/Atsushi Sakurai	Raymond Watts	5:00
4.	"Lard, Lips, Liquor"	Raymond Watts/Atsushi Sakurai/Sascha Konietzko	Raymond Watts	4:12
5.	"Porno"	Atsushi Sakurai	Sascha Konietzko/Lucia Cifarelli	4:37
6.	"Organzola"	Raymond Watts/Atsushi Sakurai	Sascha Konietzko	4:17
7.	"Schwein"	Sascha Konietzko/Atsushi Sakurai	Sascha Konietzko	3:57
8.	"World's Junk"	Raymond Watts	Hisashi Imai	4:28
9.	"Slip"	Raymond Watts/Atsushi Sakurai	Hisashi Imai	4:21
10.	"Fantasia"	Raymond Watts/Atsushi Sakurai	Raymond Watts	6:49
11.	"My Sanctuary"	Raymond Watts/Atsushi Sakurai	Raymond Watts	7:39
Total length:				53:04

- Track 11 is a bonus track in the CD release. The track is a Japanese version of "My Sanctuary" by Pig from the Wrecked album.

=== Remixed album ===
Son of Schweinstein (September 5, 2001)
No.	Title	Remixer	Length
1.	"You're My Disease" (Ken Ishii Mix)	Ken Ishii	6:28
2.	"Organzola" (Main Mix)	Charlie Clouser	5:53
3.	"Lard, Lips, Liquor" (Shadow)	Hisashi Imai and Kazutoshi Yokoyama	5:58
4.	"Fantasia" (Kosh & Carry Pig Mix)	Raymond Watts	6:54
5.	"Porno" (Strip Down Dub)	Haloblack	4:39
6.	"Spank the Monkey" (Can't Save Shant Save Mix)	One True Parker	6:17
7.	"World's Junk" (R.K. Mix)	Russell Kearney	4:36
8.	"Slip" (Mekon Mix)	Mekon	5:42
9.	"Organzola" (Dub Mix)	Charlie Clouser	5:55
Total length:			52:22

== Members ==
=== Official members ===
- Raymond Watts - guitars, programming, vocals (PIG, Schaft, KMFDM)
- Atsushi Sakurai - vocals (Buck-Tick)
- Hisashi Imai - guitars, noises (Buck-Tick, Schaft)
- Sascha Konietzko - programming, vocals, percussion (KMFDM)

=== Guest musicians ===
- Lucia Cifarelli - vocals (KMFDM)
- Jules Hodgson - guitars, bass, programming (KMFDM)
- Chris Ignatiou - guitars (One Minute Silence)
- Kazutoshi Yokoyama - Manipulate, Additional programming (Buck-Tick touring member)
- Julian Beeston - Additional programming
- Steve White - guitars, programming

=== Touring members ===
- Bryan Black - keyboards
- Arianne Schreiber - backing vocals
- Andy Selway - drums (KMFDM)
