= 97BT99 =

Compilation album by Buck-Tick
- Released: March 29, 2000
- Genres: Industrial rock; alternative rock
- Label: Mercury

Buck-Tick chronology
BT (1999)	97BT99 (2000)	One Life, One Death (2000)

97BT99 is the fourth compilation album by Buck-Tick, released on March 29, 2000. It contains various material the band released while signed to Mercury Music Entertainment. It reached number thirty-nine on the Oricon chart.

== Track listing ==
=== Disc One ===
1. "Heroine" (ヒロイン)
2. "Rasenchu -Tapeworm Mix-" (螺旋 虫 -Tapeworm Mix-; Spiral Worm -Tapeworm Mix-)
3. "Thanatos" (タナトス)
4. "Sexy Stream Liner"
5. "Heroine -Angel Dust Mix-" (ヒロイン -Angel Dust Mix-)
6. "Muchi no Namida" (無知の涙; Tear for Ignorance)
7. "Lizard Skin no Shoujo" (リザードスキンの少女; Lizard-Skinned Girl)
8. "Rasenchu" (螺旋 虫; Spiral Worm)
9. "Chouchou" (蝶蝶; Butterfly)
10. "Sasayaki" (囁き; Whisper)
11. "Kalavinka" (迦陵頻伽 Kalavinka)
12. "My Fuckin' Valentine"
13. "Schiz・o Gensou" (Schiz・o幻想; Schiz・o Illusions)
14. "Kimi ga Shin... Dara" (キミガシン・・・ダラ; When...You Die)

=== Disc Two ===
1. "Sasayaki -Single Mix-" (囁き -Single Mix-; Whisper -Single Mix-)
2. "Thanatos -Japanic Pig Mix-" (タナトス -Japanic Pig Mix-)
3. "My Fuckin' Valentine -Enemy Mix (Full)-"
4. "Schiz・o Gensou -The Spiderman Mix-" (Schiz・o幻想 -The Spiderman Mix-; Schiz・o Illusions -The Spiderman Mix-)
5. "Gessekai" (月世界; Lunar World)
6. "My Baby Japanese"
7. "Muchi no Namida Hot remix #001 for B-T" (無知の涙 HOT remix #001 for B-T; Tear for Ignorance HOT remix #001 for B-T)
8. "Bran-New Lover"
9. "Down"
10. "Asylum Garden"
11. "Miu" (ミウ)
12. "Paradise" (パラダイス)
13. "Bran-New Lover -Custom-"
