= Koroshi no Shirabe: This Is Not Greatest Hits =

Studio album of re-recorded songs by Buck-Tick
- Released: March 21, 1992; September 19, 2002 (digital remaster); September 5, 2007 (remaster)
- Recorded: December 1991 – January 1992 at Victor Aoyama Studio in Tokyo
- Genre: Punk rock; post-punk; gothic rock; power pop; alternative rock; industrial rock
- Length: 71:11
- Language: Japanese, English
- Label: Victor
- Producer: Hitoshi Hiruma and Buck-Tick

Buck-Tick chronology
Kurutta Taiyou (1991)	Koroshi no Shirabe: This Is Not Greatest Hits (1992)	Darker Than Darkness: Style 93 (1993)

Koroshi no Shirabe: This Is Not Greatest Hits (殺シノ調ベ This is ~~NOT~~ Greatest Hits; "Songs of Murder: This Is Not Greatest Hits") is a self-covers album released by the Japanese rock band Buck-Tick. It was released on cassette and CD on March 21, 1992, through Victor Entertainment. All of the tracks on the album are re-recordings of songs from the band's previous albums featuring different musical arrangements, because of this some argue that it could be considered a compilation or remix album. The album was digitally remastered and re-released on September 19, 2002, with a bonus track. It was remastered and re-released again on September 5, 2007. Koroshi no Shirabe: This Is Not Greatest Hits peaked at number one on the Oricon charts. It was certified gold in April 1992, and has sold 338,000 copies.

== Track listing ==
All lyrics are written by Atsushi Sakurai, except where noted; all music is composed by Hisashi Imai, except where noted.

No.	Title	Length
1.	"Iconoclasm" (lyrics written by Imai)	3:52
2.	"Aku no Hana" (悪の華; Evil Flower)	4:34
3.	"Do the "I Love You"" (lyrics written by Imai)	4:18
4.	"Victims of Love"	7:19
5.	"M・A・D"	4:05
6.	"Oriental Love Story"	5:49
7.	"Speed" (スピード)	4:54
8.	"Love Me"	5:13
9.	"Jupiter" (music written by Hidehiko Hoshino)	6:01
10.	"...In Heaven..."	4:12
11.	"Moonlight"	4:23
12.	"Just One More Kiss"	4:25
13.	"Taboo"	5:53
14.	"Hyper Love" (lyrics written by Imai)	5:12
Total length:		71:11

2002 digital remaster bonus tracks
No.	Title	Length
15.	"M・A・D" (live from Climax Together on September 11, 1992)	4:54

== Personnel ==
- Atsushi Sakurai – lead vocals
- Hisashi Imai – lead guitar, backing vocals
- Hidehiko Hoshino – rhythm guitar, backing vocals
- Yutaka Higuchi – bass
- Toll Yagami – drums

Additional performers

- Kazutoshi Yokoyama – keyboards
- Tadashi Nanba – backing vocals

Production

- Hitoshi Hiruma – producer, recording, mixing
- Buck-Tick – producers
- Takafumi Muraki; Osamu Takagi – executive producers
- Takahiro Uchida; Shigetoshi Naitoh; Yasuaki "V" Shindoh – engineers
- Takashi Aonuma; Shinichi Ishizuka; Yoko Ohta; Fumio Hasegawa; Hisashi Ikeda – assistant engineers
- Ken Sakaguchi – cover art, graphic design
- Kazuhiro Kitaoka – photography
