= Super Value Buck-Tick =

Compilation album by Buck-Tick
- Released: December 19, 2001
- Genre: Industrial rock
- Label: Universal/Kitty MME

Buck-Tick chronology
One Life, One Death Cut Up (2001)	Super Value Buck-Tick (2001)	Kyokutou I Love You (2002)

Super Value Buck-Tick is the fifth compilation album by Buck-Tick, released on December 19, 2001. The album's name is very fitting, this unauthorized release really meant "good value", as this release is generally several hundred yen cheaper than their other albums. It is essentially half of Sexy Stream Liner plus the 3 singles that followed.

== Track listing ==
1. "Heroine" (ヒロイン)
2. "Thanatos" (タナトス)
3. "Lizard Skin no Shojo" (リザードスキンの少女; Lizard-Skinned Girl)
4. "Chouchou" (蝶蝶; Butterfly)
5. "Sasayaki" (囁き; Whisper)
6. "My Fuckin' Valentine"
7. "Kimi ga Shin... Dara" (キミガシン...ダラ; When...You Die)
8. "Gessekai" (月世界; Lunar World)
9. "Bran-New Lover"
10. "Miu" (ミウ)
