= Haruka Tono =

Japanese novelist

- 遠野遥
- Born: Tōno Haruka; August 22, 1991 (age 35); Fujisawa, Kanagawa, Japan
- Education: Keio University
- Occupation: Novelist
- Relatives: Atsushi Sakurai (father)
- Writing career
- Language: Japanese
- Years active: 2019–present
- Notable awards: Bungei Prize (2019); Akutagawa Prize (2020)

Haruka Tono (Japanese: 遠野遥, Hepburn: Tōno Haruka; born 1991) is a Japanese novelist from Fujisawa, Kanagawa.

== Life and career ==
Tono's father was Japanese rock musician and singer-songwriter Atsushi Sakurai. His parents divorced when he was a year old. Tono graduated from Komayose Elementary School and Ohba Junior High School in Fujisawa, Kanagawa Prefectural Hakuyo High School, and the Faculty of Law at Keio University. He did not read a lot in school and was rather more into sports. For a short while he was in a high school band. He later moved to Tokyo.

In 2020, Tono won the Akutagawa Prize for his book Hakyoku (破局). He also won the Bungei Prize in 2019 for his work Kairyō (改良). In 2021, his work Kyōiku (教育) was shortlisted for the Noma Literary Newcomer Award (野間文芸新人賞).
