= At the Night Side =

Live album by Buck-Tick
- Released: April 7, 2004
- Recorded: Hibiya Yagai Ongakudo (June 28 & 29, 2003), NHK Hall (April 10, 2003), Shibuya-AX (April 30, 2003)
- Genres: Alternative rock; industrial rock
- Label: BMG/Funhouse

Buck-Tick chronology
Mona Lisa Overdrive (2003)	At the Night Side (2004)	13kai wa Gekkou (2005)

At the Night Side is the third live album by Buck-Tick, released on April 7, 2004. Its content was recorded at four different concerts in three different places; Hibiya Yagai Ongakudo on June 28 & 29 2003, NHK Hall on April 10, 2003, and Shibuya-AX on April 30, 2003. It reached number thirty-four on the Oricon chart.

== Track listing ==
1. "Continue"
2. "Nakayubi" (ナカユビ)
3. "Heroine"
4. "Limbo"
5. "Zangai" (残骸)
6. "Monster"
7. "Buster"
8. "Kirameki no Naka de..." (キラメキの中で･･･)
9. "Mienai Mono o Miyo to Suru Gokai Subete Gokai da" (見えない物を見ようとする誤解 全て誤解だ)
10. "Tight Rope"
11. "Black Cherry"
12. "Girl"
13. "Baby, I Want You."
14. "Genzai" (原罪)
15. "Ai no Uta" (愛ノ歌)
16. "Mona Lisa"
17. "Sid Vicious on the Beach"
18. "Cyborg Dolly: Sora-mimi: Phantom" (細胞具：ドリー：ソラミミ：Phantom)
19. "Iconoclasm"
