= One Life, One Death Cut Up =

Live album by Buck-Tick
- Released: March 28, 2001
- Recorded: Nippon Budokan (December 29, 2000)
- Genre: Alternative rock; industrial rock
- Label: BMG/Funhouse

Buck-Tick chronology
One Life, One Death (2000)	One Life, One Death Cut Up (2001)	Super Value Buck-Tick (2001)

One Life, One Death Cut Up is the second live album by Buck-Tick, released on March 28, 2001. It was recorded at Nippon Budokan on December 29, 2000, the last track, "Kodou" is a bonus track and was recorded on December 16, 2000, at Nagoya Century Hall. It reached number thirty-two on the Oricon chart.

== Track listing ==
=== Disc One ===
1. "Thing III"
2. "Glamorous"
3. "Uta" (唄; Song)
4. "Check Up"
5. "Sapphire" (サファイア)
6. "Down"
7. "Asylum Garden"
8. "Chaos - Kirameki no Naka de..." (Chaos～キラメキの中で...; Chaos - In the Glitter...)
9. "Miu" (ミウ)
10. "Cyborg Dolly: Sora-mimi: Phantom" (細胞具ドリー：ソラミミ：Phantom; Cell Tool Dolly: A Phantom Feigning Deafness)
11. "Death Wish"

=== Disc Two ===
1. "Kain" (カイン; Cain)
2. "Megami" (女神; Goddess)
3. "Flame"
4. "Bran-New Lover"
5. "Baby, I Want You."
6. "Rhapsody"
7. "Dress" (ドレス)
8. "Idol"
9. "Ash-Ra"
10. "Physical Neurose"
11. "Kodou" (鼓動; Heartbeat)
