= Hisashi Imai =

Japanese musician and songwriter (born 1965)

- Born: October 21, 1965 (age 60)
- Origin: Fujioka, Gunma, Japan
- Genre: Rock
- Occupations: Musician, songwriter
- Instruments: Guitar; vocals; theremin
- Years active: 1983–present
- Member of: Buck-Tick
- Formerly of: Schaft, Schwein

Hisashi Imai (Japanese: 今井 寿, Hepburn: Imai Hisashi; born October 21, 1965) is a Japanese musician, singer and songwriter. He is best known as the lead guitarist of the rock band Buck-Tick since 1983. Following the October 2023 death of vocalist Atsushi Sakurai, Imai began sharing lead vocal duties in the band with fellow guitarist Hidehiko Hoshino. He has also performed in side-projects such as the duo Schaft with Soft Ballet member Maki Fujii, the supergroup Schwein, and the rock trio Lucy. Imai is known for his visual aesthetics, and Buck-Tick are commonly credited as one of the founders of the visual kei movement.

== Early life ==
When Imai was in elementary school, his uncle gave him an acoustic guitar and tried to teach him how to play it. Despite being right-handed, Imai said it just felt natural for him to play the instrument left-handed. Regardless, he was not interested in guitar at the time and ended up ignoring it. But when he decided to start a band in high school, he was conscious that choosing the wrong handedness would cause problems, and ultimately went with left-handed. The first song he ever played was "Romantist" by The Stalin.

In addition to his music, Imai is also known for his visual aesthetics. When he and his friend Araki, Buck-Tick's original singer, graduated high school in 1984, they moved to Tokyo together, where Imai entered design school. He has cited Akira Uno, Tadanori Yokoo, Salvador Dalí, Giorgio de Chirico, Hirohiko Araki and Tsutomu Nihei as artistic influences.

== Career ==
Imai has been the guitarist and main composer of Buck-Tick since 1983. He was also the main lyricist on their first two studio albums, Hurry Up Mode and Sexual XXXXX!, both released in 1987. The following year, their single "Just One More Kiss" marked their breakthrough when it reached number six on the Oricon Singles Chart. In January 1989, their fourth studio album Taboo reached number one. However, Imai was arrested for LSD possession that April, and the band briefly halted activities. The guitarist was given a suspended sentence, and the band's agency was flooded with fan letters pleading for them not to disband. That autumn, they entered the studio to record their fifth studio album Aku no Hana. When released in February 1990, it reached number one and became their best-selling album to date. Buck-Tick continued their success for more than 30 years, as nearly all of their subsequent albums have reached the top ten on the Oricon chart. This includes 2023's Izora, their twenty-third studio album and last with Atsushi Sakurai on vocals.

Imai formed the duo Schaft with Maki Fujii of Soft Ballet in 1991. They released the album Switchblade in 1994 and were sporadically active until 1999. They reunited in 2015, and released their second album Ultra in 2016.

In 2001, Imai and Sakurai teamed up with English and German industrial musicians Raymond Watts and Sascha Konietzko to form the supergroup Schwein. They released one studio album, Schweinstein, one remix album, Son of Schweinstein, and held a Japanese tour, all before dissolving within the year.

In 2004, Imai formed the rock trio Lucy with guitarist and vocalist Kiyoshi (Spread Beaver, Machine) and drummer Katsushige Okazaki (Age of Punk). They derived their name from Lucy Monostone, a character in the manga series MPD Psycho. Both Imai and Kiyoshi provide guitar and vocals, and write music and lyrics for the group. They released two albums; Rockarollica and Rockarollica II, three DVDs; Lucy Show - Shout, Speed, Shake Your Rockarollica, Lucy Show 002 Live at Unit and Lucy Show 002 Live at Studio Coast, and one single; "Bullets -Shooting Super Star-". After having been inactive since November 2008, Lucy resumed activities in 2026, and released the album Rockarollica III on April 23.

In 2008, Imai announced on his blog that he got married. He announced the birth of his first child in August 2013.

Imai has also appeared on/composed for Mika Kaneko's Kick, Naoko Nozawa's Tonkichi Chinpei Kanta, Der Zibet's Shishunki II, Soft Ballet's Million Mirrors, The Stalin's Shinda Mono Hodo Aishite Yaru Sa, PIG's Sinsation and Wrecked, Yukinojo Mori's Tenshi no Ita Wakusei and Poetic Evolution ~With Eleven Guitarists~, Guniw Tools's Dazzle, Acid Android's Code, the compilation Tribute to The Star Club featuring Hikage, and Tomoyasu Hotei's All Time Super Guest. Together with Yukinojo Mori, Imai covered the song "Eyes Love You" for the 2013 Hide tribute album Tribute VII -Rock Spirits-. Imai composed the song "Koisuru Christine" for the 2017 album Manyoshu by Kishidan, who then had Sakurai write the lyrics. Imai also composed the music to "Flower Tambourine Dance" for Kishow's 2024 album Shin'ya Reiji.

== Equipment ==
Imai has used numerous guitars throughout his career, but the vast majority have been Fernandes, with whom he has many signature models. In Buck-Tick's indie years, after seeing fellow Gunma Prefecture-native Tomoyasu Hotei paint his guitars, Imai followed suit and painted a Fernandes TEJ black and red. After the band made their major label debut, Imai worked with Fernandes to design a custom model. First was the Tsuchinoko, which had a diamond-shaped body. But it was smaller than anticipated and he felt the balance was off, so they then created the BT-MM model, also known as "Maimai" (マイマイ). Imai wanted to play the guitar with a bow during live performances, so its appearance mimics the shape of a violin, including having F-holes painted on it. The BT-MM was first used at the Tokyo Dome in 1989, and has become the model he is most often associated with. Another of his signature model guitars is the Stabilizer, which he first used on the 1996 Chaos tour and has a very unusual shape in that it has a second piece (other than the neck) connecting the body to the headstock. When Lucy was formed in 2004, Imai and fellow guitarist Kiyoshi both used custom Fernandes guitars named Kanoke. As the Romanized Japanese name suggests, they are shaped like coffins. The manufacturer then released Imai's signature Dazzler model, modeled after the shape of a mandolin, around the time of the album Razzle Dazzle (2010). For the 30th anniversary of Buck-Tick's major label debut, Fernandes created the signature Gustave model for Imai. Largely similar to the BT-MM in appearance, albeit with a leopard paint job that lacks F-holes, it also takes elements from the Dazzler. The back of its neck has "BRAVO TANGO" written on it; representing the initials of his band's name in the NATO phonetic alphabet.

== Discography ==
With Buck-Tick

With Schaft

With Schwein

With Lucy

- Rockarollica (June 9, 2004) Oricon peak position: #16
- Lucy Show - Shout, Speed, Shake Your Rockarollica (November 17, 2004) #35
- "Bullets -Shooting Super Star-" (March 29, 2006) #28
- Rockarollica II (April 26, 2006) #42
- Lucy Show 002 Live at Unit (November 1, 2006) #52
- Lucy Show 002 Live at Studio Coast (November 1, 2006) #46
- Rockarollica III (April 23, 2026) #15
- Lucy Show 003 ~Shout, Speed, Shake Your Rockarollica~ (September 30, 2026)
