= Toll Yagami =

Japanese musician (born 1962)

- Born: Takashi Higuchi; August 19, 1962 (age 63)
- Origin: Takasaki, Gunma, Japan
- Genres: Rock
- Occupation: Musician
- Instrument: Drums
- Years active: 1977–present
- Member of: Buck-Tick
- Website: Official website

Takashi Higuchi (Japanese: 樋口隆, Hepburn: Higuchi Takashi; born August 19, 1962 in Takasaki, Gunma), known exclusively by his stage name Toll Yagami (ヤガミ トール, Yagami Tōru), is a Japanese musician, best known as the drummer of the rock band Buck-Tick since 1985. He is the older brother of Yutaka Higuchi, Buck-Tick's bassist.

== Life and career ==
Toll Yagami dropped out of high school in the tenth grade. His first bands were Shout and Spots, with the latter eventually changing their name to SP. In 1984, the members of Buck-Tick, the band of Yagami's younger brother Yutaka, moved to Tokyo, sans drummer Atsushi Sakurai. Sakurai asked Yagami if he could join SP as vocalist, but was refused. A year later, when Buck-Tick's vocalist Araki was fired and Sakurai replaced him, Yutaka convinced Yagami to join as their drummer. The line-up has remained the same since, and Buck-Tick are commonly credited as one of the founders of the visual kei movement.

Throughout Buck-Tick's long career, Yagami's only writing credits have been lyrics for two songs; "Feast of Demoralization" (on Taboo) and "Dizzy Moon" (on Aku no Hana). Yagami was the head of Banker, the management company that Buck-Tick formed in 1996.

Yagami was inspired at an early age by classic rock such as The Beatles, Creedence Clearwater Revival, and Deep Purple. He held drum clinics in Japan in May 1994 and the summer of 1999. He has also played on the 1999 album Super Rock Summit ~Tengoku he no Kaidan~ (Super Rock Summit〜天国への階段〜) (tribute album for John Bonham of Led Zeppelin), performing the song "Hot Dog".

Genet, vocalist of Japanese goth band Auto-Mod, is good friends with Yagami and occasionally writes about him on his blog. Yagami supported Auto-Mod at their live at Shinjuku Loft in 2006 (the live was part of a set of shows celebrating the venue's 30th anniversary.) Selia, the backup vocalist, was introduced to Buck-Tick through Genet and performed backing vocals on the songs "Mr. Darkness and Mrs. Moonlight" and "Revolver" on Buck-Tick's 2007 album Tenshi no Revolver.

On August 19, 2018, Yagami released his autobiography, 1977: Yagami Toll Jiden.

=== Yagami Toll & The Blue Sky ===
Yagami Toll & The Blue Sky is Yagami's solo project that he started in 2004. It consisted of himself as drummer and vocalist, Jose Tino PePe and Mr. Big Dig as The Blue Sky, and Alex Tamagi and James Norwood as the Optical Surfers on bass, guitar, keyboards. Other vocalists such as Suzu and Mike also appeared.

Their first album, 1977/Blue Sky, was released on July 28, 2004. The album is said to be a highly personal album. Yagami's inspiration being dealing with the loss of his older brother, who died in a motorcycle accident in May 1977.

Yagami Toll & The Blue Sky's second album, Wonderful Home -Thunder & Cold Wind-, was released on August 19, 2019. It features Yagami on drums, Kenta Harada on vocals and guitar, Kaname on vocals and bass, and Masato Yagi on guitar.
