= Atsushi Sakurai =

Japanese musician (1966–2023)

Atsushi Sakurai 桜井 敦司
- Sakurai performing in 2017

Background information
- Born: March 7, 1966; Fujioka, Gunma, Japan
- Died: October 19, 2023 (aged 57) Yokohama, Japan
- Genres: Alternative rock; industrial rock; punk rock; gothic rock
- Occupations: Musician; singer; actor
- Instruments: Vocals; drums; saxophone
- Years active: 1983–2023
- Labels: Victor; Cutting Edge
- Formerly of: Buck-Tick; Schwein
- Website: sakurai-atsushi.com

Atsushi Sakurai (Japanese: 櫻井 敦司, Hepburn: Sakurai Atsushi; March 7, 1966 – October 19, 2023) was a Japanese musician. He was the lead vocalist and primary lyricist of the rock band Buck-Tick from 1985 until his death in 2023. Initially joining as their drummer in 1983, Sakurai fronted the band for 38 years and 23 studio albums, nearly all of which reached the top ten on Japan's Oricon chart. Sakurai and Buck-Tick are commonly credited as among the founders of the visual kei movement.

Sakurai released the solo album Ai no Wakusei in 2004, and was a member of Schwein alongside his Buck-Tick bandmate Hisashi Imai, Sascha Konietzko and Raymond Watts. In 2015, he debuted a solo project called The Mortal. After falling ill during a Buck-Tick concert, Sakurai died from a brainstem hemorrhage in a Yokohama hospital on October 19, 2023.

== Early life ==
Atsushi Sakurai was born in Fujioka, Gunma on March 7, 1966, as the youngest of two sons. He shared a birthday and blood type with his father, whom Sakurai described as an alcoholic that he also physically resembled. After buying a large stereo in his fifth year of elementary school, the first record Sakurai ever bought was Shinji Harada's Feel Happy. He was impressed by Kiss' makeup and the Bay City Rollers' melodies and clothing, but preferred Harada, Twist, and Char. Although he received an acoustic guitar at the same time, he gave the instrument up after about a week. Despite really enjoying listening to music, he did not consider becoming a musician at the time.

By the time Sakurai entered Gunma Kenritsu Fujioka High School, he was a loner who hung out with the bad-kid yankī crowd and whose friends were mainly from outside the school. This changed in his third year of high school, when he became friends with his classmate Hisashi Imai, who introduced him to punk rock. While listening to records together, they would often talk about starting a band and selected their respective instruments, despite none of them being able to play at the time. Sakurai chose drums because he thought it would be cool. He later said that seeing fellow Gunma band Boøwy served as an initial inspiration for starting a band, followed soon after by Bauhaus and David Bowie. After graduating in 1984, Sakurai got a job and continued to play in the band, soon after re-named Buck-Tick. However, he said being in the band was simply because he had nothing else to do. He described this as the worst period of his life and began to drink a lot like his father.

== Career ==
=== Buck-Tick ===
When the other members of Buck-Tick graduated from high school and moved to Tokyo, Sakurai was the only one left in Gunma Prefecture because his father was against his band activities and Sakurai was worried about his mother. Sakurai then set his mind on becoming a singer. He asked Toll Yagami if he could be the vocalist of his band SP, but was declined. When his father died in October 1984, Sakurai moved to Tokyo a year later. When the singer of Buck-Tick left, Sakurai decided he wanted to be the vocalist in December 1985, and the rest of the band relented due to his enthusiasm. Until then, he had rarely insisted on anything.

Buck-Tick released their major label debut album Sexual XXXXX! through Victor Entertainment in 1987. Their 1988 single "Just One More Kiss" marked their breakthrough when it reached number six on the Oricon Singles Chart. The following year, their fourth studio album Taboo reached number one and they performed at the Tokyo Dome for the first time. In 1990, the single "Aku no Hana" and the album of the same name each reached number one on their respective charts. Buck-Tick continued their success for more than 30 years, as nearly all of their subsequent albums have reached the top ten on the Oricon chart. This includes 2023's Izora, their twenty-third studio album and last with Sakurai.

Sakurai's last name was originally written with the first kanji as "桜" ("sakura"), but when his mother died in 1990 he changed it to "櫻", the older version. He also wrote "Jupiter" and "Sakura" about his mother's death. Sakurai married Buck-Tick's stylist in 1991. They had one son, Akutagawa Prize-winning author Haruka Tono, before divorcing a year later. He married again in June 2004.

Buck-Tick's Chaos After Dark Tour was scheduled to begin in December 1996. However, it was postponed after Sakurai fell seriously ill with acute peritonitis while at a photo shoot in Nepal. With his life at risk, he was flown back to Japan, where he was hospitalized for about a month. The missed concert dates were made up for with a tour in March 1997.

On December 9, 2018, Sakurai was visibly unwell during Buck Tick's concert at Zepp DiverCity, but he insisted on finishing the performance. After the concert, he was diagnosed with gastrointestinal bleeding and subsequent shows had to be postponed for his treatment.

=== Solo career and other work ===
Outside of Buck-Tick, Sakurai appeared on the song "Masquerade" from Der Zibet's 1991 album Shishunki II, and its re-recording for 2010's Kaikoteki Mirai - Nostalgic Future. He collaborated with Dutch band Xymox on the song "Yokan" (予感) for the March 1992 compilation album Dance 2 Noise 002. Sakurai provided backing vocals to "Koi no Hallelujah" on the 1994 album Flowers by Der Zibet vocalist Issay, as well as the songs "No One Gets Out of Her Alive" and "Contempt" from the 1996 album Wrecked by English recording act Pig. For Masami Tsuchiya's 1998 album Mori no Hito ~Forest People~, he sings lead vocals on "A Mid Summer Night's Forest" and "Goblin Forest", which he wrote the lyrics to.

Sakurai and his Buck-Tick bandmate Hisashi Imai teamed up with English and German industrial musicians Raymond Watts and Sascha Konietzko to form the supergroup Schwein in 2001. They released one studio album, Schweinstein, one remix album, Son of Schweinstein, and held a Japanese tour, all before dissolving within the year. In a 2023 interview with Visual Music Japan, Watts cited Schwein as his favorite collaboration to date and called Sakurai a "grand vocalist".

In 2004, Sakurai released his first solo album Ai no Wakusei. It features music composed by a variety of musicians such as Wayne Hussey, Taiji Sato (Theatre Brook), and Robin Guthrie. 2004 also saw his acting debut, with the lead role in Ryuhei Kitamura's short film Longinus. He released a book of his poetry and lyrics called Yasou (夜想; "Nocturne") in 2004.

Sakurai co-wrote the song "Shinkai" for Chiaki Kuriyama's 2011 debut album Circus.

In 2015, he announced the formation of his second solo project, a band called the Mortal. The group consisted of guitarist Jake Cloudchair (Guniw Tools), guitarist Yukio Murata (My Way My Love), bassist Ken Miyo (M-Age) and drummer Takahito Akiyama (Downy). The mini album Spirit was released on October 14 and they played a five-date tour in November. The full-length album I am Mortal was released on November 11, 2015.

Sakurai wrote the lyrics to the song "Koisuru Christine", which Imai composed for Kishidan's 2017 album Manyoshu. Sakurai was the narrator of the 2018 anime film Neko Ki Kaku. He sang the song "Kakeochi-mono" with Ringo Sheena as a duet for her 2019 album Sandokushi.

== Death and legacy ==
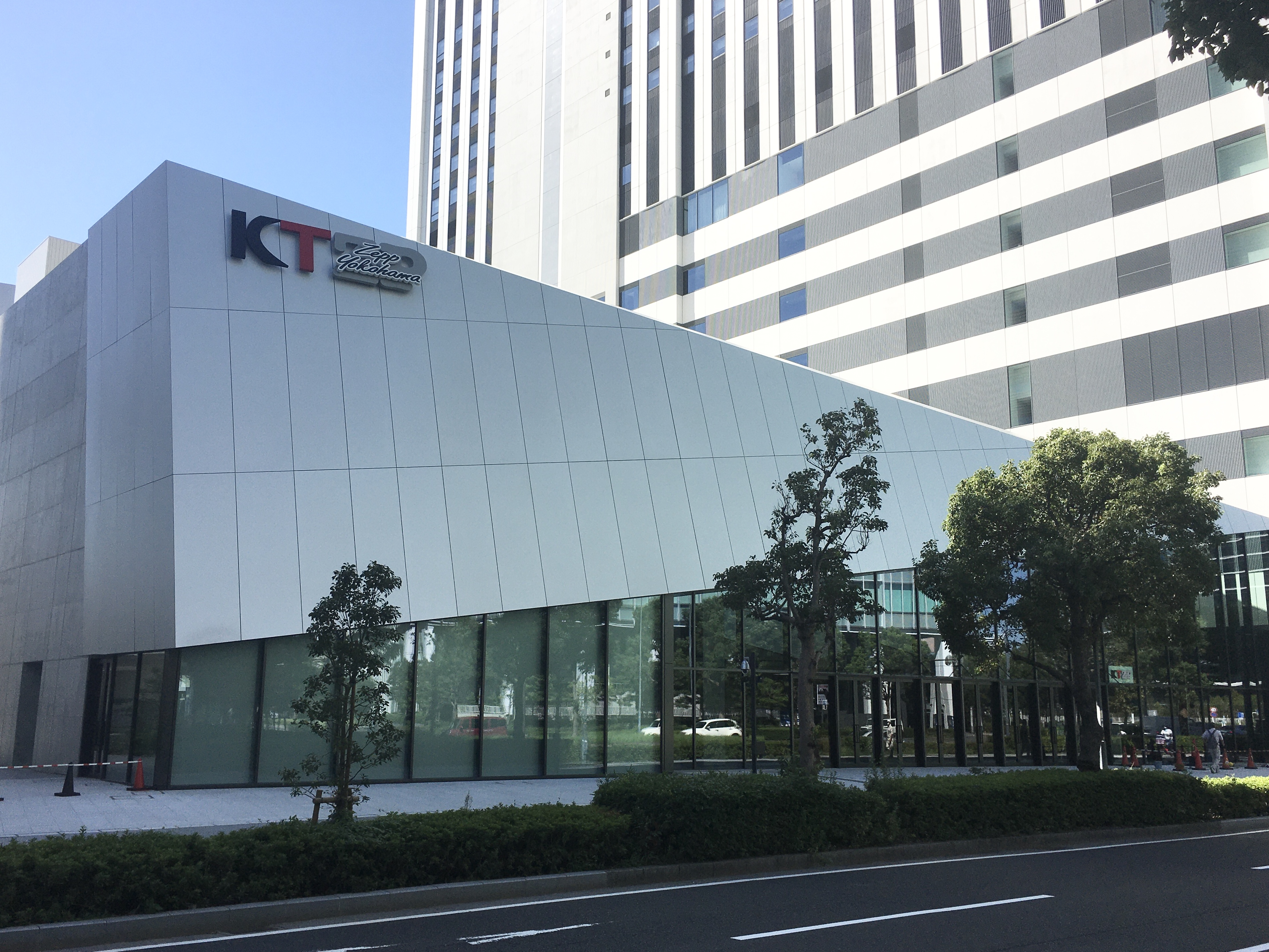
Sakurai died after cutting short a concert at KT Zepp Yokohama.

On October 19, 2023, during a Buck-Tick concert at KT Zepp Yokohama in Yokohama, Japan, that was exclusively for members of their fan club, Sakurai was rushed to a hospital due to sudden signs of illness, abruptly ending the performance. According to attendees, he was visibly unwell during the first song, "Scarecrow", sat down to perform the second, "Boy Septem Peccata Mortalia", and was then escorted off stage by staff after the third song, "Zekkai". He died at the hospital at 11:09 p.m. that night, at the age of 57. The cause of death was revealed to be a brainstem hemorrhage. A private funeral, attended by close friends and family, was held in the following days. His death was announced by the band on October 24. Buck-Tick held a two-day memorial event for Sakurai, titled The Ceremony -Atsushi Sakurai e- (THE CEREMONY -櫻井敦司へ-), at Zepp Haneda on December 8 and 9. It was attended by an estimated 20,000 people.

Sports Nippon described Sakurai as a "charismatic figure who led the rock world of the 1980s". The Mainichi Shimbun wrote that Sakurai was known for his handsome appearance and unique singing voice. Several musicians publicly expressed their condolences over his death, including Tomoyasu Hotei, Sugizo, Gackt, Daigo, and Diamond Yukai. Izam said he had admired Sakurai since his school days, and related how when he first met him, "it felt as if I had touched a god". Show Ayanocozey remarked, "he was a true rock hero who lived on stage until the very end, and was in the spotlight right up to the moment of his death. Who else has done such a thing?" Sakurai was posthumously honored with a Lifetime Achievement Award at the 65th Japan Record Awards on December 30, 2023.

In 2011, Japanese rock music critics writing for Metropolis included Sakurai in their Pantheon of Japanese Rock Gods. According to Shweta Basu, the musician's good looks and "aloof and dangerous aura" inspired many fictional characters, most notably the rock singer Kouji Nanjo in the manga series Zetsuai 1989. Manga artist Ami Shibata, creator of Papuwa and Jibaku-kun, admitted she modeled several of her characters in his image. Dir En Grey vocalist Kyo was inspired to become a rock star after seeing a picture of Sakurai on the desk of a junior high school classmate. Mucc frontman Tatsuro cited Sakurai as the vocalist who has influenced him the most, including his lyrics and stage presence.

== Discography ==
Singles

- "Sacrifice" (May 26, 2004), Oricon Singles Chart Peak Position: #25
- "Taiji/Smell" (胎児/SMELL; "Embryo/Smell") July 21, 2004 #22
- "Wakusei -Rebirth-" (惑星-Rebirth-; "Planet -Rebirth-") February 23, 2005 #62

Albums

- Ai no Wakusei (愛の惑星; "Planet of Love") June 23, 2004, Oricon Albums Chart Peak Position: #15

DVDs

- Longinus (August 25, 2004, short film), Oricon DVDs Chart Peak Position: #16
- -Explosion- Ai no Wakusei Live 2004 (-EXPLOSION -愛の惑星Live2004; December 16, 2004) #47

With the Mortal

- Spirit (October 14, 2015) #11
- I am Mortal (November 11, 2015) #12
- Immortal (March 9, 2016, home video)

With Buck-Tick

With Schwein

== Books ==
- Yasou (夜想; "Nocturne") July 14, 2004
- Sacrifice (July 20, 2004)
- Sakurai Atsushi Zen Shishū Jōkan: The Lyrics 1987–2005 (櫻井敦司全詩集上巻, Sakurai Atsushi Zen Shishū Jōkan; March 7, 2026)
- Sakurai Atsushi Zen Shishū Gekan: The Lyrics 2006–∞ (櫻井敦司全詩集下巻, Sakurai Atsushi Zen Shishū Gekan; March 7, 2026)
