= Hidehiko Hoshino =

Japanese musician and songwriter (born 1966)

- Also known as: Hide
- Born: June 16, 1966 (age 59)
- Origin: Fujioka, Gunma, Japan
- Genres: Rock
- Occupations: Musician, songwriter
- Instruments: Guitar; vocals; keyboards
- Years active: 1983–present
- Member of: Buck-Tick

Hidehiko Hoshino (Japanese: 星野 英彦, Hepburn: Hoshino Hidehiko; born June 16, 1966), nicknamed "Hide", is a Japanese musician, singer and songwriter. He is best known as the rhythm guitarist of the rock band Buck-Tick since 1983. Following the October 2023 death of vocalist Atsushi Sakurai, Hoshino began sharing lead vocal duties in the band with fellow guitarist Hisashi Imai.

== Life and career ==
=== Buck-Tick ===
In 1985, when Hide and Yutaka Higuchi graduated from high school they moved to Tokyo together, where Hide started culinary school. Throughout Buck-Tick's long career, he has the second most songwriting credits.

Hoshino married in 2006.

He has released only one solo song; "Jarring Voice" on the 1991 compilation Dance 2 Noise 001. Tomoyuki Hokari of OK Music described the track as "aggressive electronic body music". Hoshino has also performed on Issay's Flowers, Fake?'s Marilyn is a Bubble and Chiaki Kuriyama's Circus.

On September 19, 2012, Hoshino released the book Simply Life. It compiles the interviews he gave to the magazine Ongaku to Hito every year since 2001 with a new long interview. It was republished in 2022 as Simply Life ~Life Goes On~.

=== Dropz ===
Dropz (stylized as dropz) is a side project of Hidehiko Hoshino that began in 2006. The members consist of himself (guitars, programming & keyboards), Kelli Dayton (vocals) and Cube Juice (programming & electronics). He wrote the music, while Kelli wrote the lyrics. They released their first album, Sweet Oblivion, on April 4, 2007, and a limited edition remix of the same album.

== Discography ==
With Buck-Tick

With Dropz

- Sweet Oblivion (April 4, 2007) Oricon peak position: #71
