= Yutaka Higuchi (musician) =

Japanese musician (born 1967)

- Also known as: U-ta
- Born: January 24, 1967 (age 59)
- Origin: Takasaki, Gunma, Japan
- Genres: Rock
- Occupation: Musician
- Instrument: Bass
- Years active: 1983–present
- Member of: Buck-Tick
- Website: Official website

Yutaka Higuchi (桶口 豊, Higuchi Yutaka; born January 24, 1967 in Takasaki, Gunma), nicknamed "U-ta", is a Japanese musician. Known as the bassist of the rock band Buck-Tick since 1983. He is the younger brother of Toll Yagami, Buck-Tick's drummer.

== History ==
In 1985, when Higuchi and Hidehiko Hoshino graduated from high school they moved to Tokyo together, where Higuchi started business school. Throughout Buck-Tick's long career, his only writing credit has been lyrics for "Under the Moon Light" (b-side of the "Aku no Hana" single).

Higuchi has also performed on Fake?'s Marilyn is a Bubble, Shammon's Lorelei, and on Tribute to The Star Club featuring Hikage.

=== Wild Wise Apes ===
Wild Wise Apes is a side project that he began in 2004. It consists of himself as bassist and Atsushi Okuno as vocalist. They released their first album, 3rd World, on July 14, 2004.
