= Buck-Tick discography =

- Studio albums: 24
- Extended plays: 2
- Live albums: 5
- Compilation albums: 10
- Tribute albums: 3
- Singles: 46
- Video albums: 46
- Remix albums: 3
- Various artists compilations: 6

The discography of Buck-Tick includes 24 studio albums, 5 live albums, 2 extended plays, 46 singles, and 46 video albums. Formed in 1983 in Fujioka, Gunma, the classic lineup of lead vocalist Atsushi Sakurai, lead guitarist Hisashi Imai, rhythm guitarist Hidehiko Hoshino, bassist Yutaka Higuchi and drummer Toll Yagami lasted from 1985 until 2023. Following Sakurai's death that year, Imai and Hoshino began sharing lead vocal duties. In their four decade career, nearly all of their albums have reached the top ten on the charts and they have experimented with many different genres of music, including punk, dark wave, electronic, industrial, gothic and straight rock. Buck-Tick are commonly credited as one of the founders of the visual kei movement.

Buck-Tick released both their debut independent and major label studio albums in 1987, and achieved breakthrough success the following year with the album Seventh Heaven (#3) and the single "Just One More Kiss". In 1989, Taboo became their first number-one album. It was followed by several successful albums almost all of which topped the charts, Aku no Hana (1990, which includes the song of the same name; the band's only number-one single), Kurutta Taiyou (1991), Darker Than Darkness -Style 93- (1993), Six/Nine (1995), as well as the remixed studio album Hurry Up Mode (1990 Mix) and the compilation album Koroshi no Shirabe: This Is Not Greatest Hits (1992).

The band's best-selling albums are Aku no Hana (435,000 copies), Koroshi no Shirabe (338,000), Kurutta Taiyou (327,000), Taboo (300,000), Six/Nine (241,000), and Hurry Up Mode (215,000); while their best-selling singles are "Aku no Hana" (221,000), "Uta" (200,000), "Speed" (180,000), "Dress" (171,000), and "Just One More Kiss" (147,000).

== Studio albums ==
Year	Title	Album details	Oricon	Billboard Japan Hot	Billboard Japan Top
1987	Hurry Up Mode	Released: April 1, 1987; Label: Taiyo; Formats: LP, CD	—	—	—
1987	Sexual XXXXX!	Released: November 21, 1987; Label: Victor; Formats: LP, cassette, CD	33	—	—
1988	Seventh Heaven	Released: June 21, 1988; Label: Victor; Formats: LP, cassette, CD	3	—	—
1989	Taboo	Released: January 18, 1989; Label: Victor; Formats: LP, cassette, CD	1	—	—
1990	Aku no Hana 悪の華	Released: February 1, 1990; Label: Victor; Formats: Cassette, CD	1	—	—
1991	Kurutta Taiyou 狂った太陽	Released: February 21, 1991; Label: Victor; Formats: Cassette, CD	2	—	—
1993	Darker Than Darkness: Style 93	Released: June 23, 1993; Label: Victor; Formats: CD	2	—	—
1995	Six/Nine	Released: May 5, 1995; Label: Victor; Formats: CD	1	—	—
1996	Cosmos	Released: June 21, 1996; Label: Victor; Formats: CD	6	—	—
1997	Sexy Stream Liner	Released: December 10, 1997; Label: Mercury; Formats: CD	4	—	—
2000	One Life, One Death	Released: September 20, 2000; Label: BMG/Funhouse; Formats: CD	11	—	—
2002	Kyokutou I Love You 極東 I LOVE YOU	Released: March 6, 2002; Label: BMG/Funhouse; Formats: CD	12	—	—
2003	Mona Lisa Overdrive	Released: February 13, 2003; Label: BMG/Funhouse; Formats: CD	7	—	—
2005	Juusankai wa Gekkou 十三階は月光	Released: April 5, 2005; Label: BMG/Funhouse; Formats: CD	4	—	—
2007	Tenshi no Revolver 天使のリボルバー	Released: September 19, 2007; Label: BMG Japan; Formats: CD	5	—	—
2009	Memento Mori	Released: February 18, 2009; Label: BMG Japan; Formats: CD	7	—	7
2010	Razzle Dazzle	Released: October 13, 2010; Label: Ariola Japan; Formats: CD	6	—	6
2012	Yume Miru Uchuu 夢見る宇宙	Released: September 19, 2012; Label: Lingua Sounda/Tokuma Japan Communications; Formats: CD	14	—	12
2014	Arui wa Anarchy 或いはアナーキー	Released: June 4, 2014; Label: Lingua Sounda/Tokuma Japan Communications; Formats: CD	4	—	4
2016	Atom Miraiha No.9 アトム 未来派 No.9	Released: September 28, 2016; Label: Lingua Sounda/Victor; Formats: CD	5	6	5
2018	No.0	Released: March 14, 2018; Label: Lingua Sounda/Victor; Formats: CD	2	5	2
2020	Abracadabra	Released: September 21, 2020; Label: Lingua Sounda/Victor; Formats: CD, LP, cassette	3	5	4
2023	Izora 異空 -IZORA-	Released: April 12, 2023; Label: Lingua Sounda/Victor; Formats: CD, LP, cassette	2	3	2
2024	Subrosa スブロサ SUBROSA	Released: December 4, 2024; Label: Lingua Sounda/Victor; Formats: CD, LP, cassette	6	6	6
"—" denotes a recording released before the creation of the Billboard chart, or that did not chart.

== Mini albums/EPs ==
Year	Title	Album details	Oricon
1988	Romanesque	Released: March 21, 1988; Label: Victor; Formats: LP, cassette, CD	20
1998	LTD	Released: March 11, 1998; Label: Mercury; Formats: LP	—
"—" denotes a recording that did not chart.

== Remix albums ==
Year	Title	Album details	Oricon
1990	Hurry Up Mode (1990 Mix)	Released: February 8, 1990; Label: Victor; Formats: Cassette, CD	1
1990	Symphonic Buck-Tick in Berlin	Released: July 21, 1990; Label: Victor; Formats: Cassette, CD	—
1994	Shapeless シェイプレス	Released: August 24, 1994; Label: Victor; Formats: CD	5
"—" denotes a recording that did not chart.

== Live albums ==
Year	Title	Album details	Oricon
1998	Sweet Strange Live Disc	Released: August 12, 1998; Label: Mercury; Formats: CD	17
2001	One Life, One Death Cut Up	Released: March 28, 2001; Label: BMG/Funhouse; Formats: CD	32
2004	At the Night Side	Released: April 7, 2004; Label: BMG/Funhouse; Formats: CD	34
2017	Climax Together (1992 Compact Disc)	Released: July 20, 2017; Label: Victor; Formats: CD	33
2024	Tour 2023 Izora Finalo	Released: September 18, 2024; Label: Victor; Formats: Streaming	—
"—" denotes a streaming-only recording not eligible for the Oricon chart.

== Compilation albums ==
Year	Title	Album details	Oricon	Billboard Japan Hot Albums
1992	Koroshi no Shirabe: This Is Not Greatest Hits 殺シノ調ベ This is ~~NOT~~ Greatest Hits	Released: March 21, 1992; Label: Victor; Formats: Cassette, CD	1	—
1995	Catalogue 1987–1995	Released: December 1, 1995; Label: Victor; Formats: CD	8	—
1999	BT	Released: March 20, 1999; Label: Victor; Formats: CD	16	—
2000	97BT99	Released: March 29, 2000; Label: Mercury; Formats: CD	39	—
2001	Super Value Buck-Tick	Released: December 19, 2001; Label: Universal/Kitty MME; Formats: CD	—	—
2005	Catalogue 2005	Released: December 7, 2005; Label: BMG/Funhouse; Formats: CD	14	—
2012	Catalogue Victor→Mercury 87–99	Released: March 7, 2012; Label: Victor; Formats: CD	11	—
2012	Catalogue Ariola 00–10	Released: March 7, 2012; Label: Ariola Japan; Formats: CD	10	—
2017	Catalogue 1987–2016	Released: September 20, 2017; Label: Victor; Formats: CD	6	11
2022	Catalogue The Best 35th Anniv.	Released: September 21, 2022; Label: Victor; Formats: 5 CD and 1 Blu-ray box set	8	9
"—" denotes a recording released before the creation of the Billboard chart.

== Tribute albums ==
Year	Title	Album details	Oricon	Billboard Japan Hot Albums
2005	Parade: Respective Tracks of Buck-Tick	Released: December 21, 2005; Label: BMG/Funhouse; Formats: CD	14	—
2012	Parade II: Respective Tracks of Buck-Tick	Released: July 4, 2012; Label: Lingua Sounda; Formats: CD	16	—
2020	Parade III: Respective Tracks of Buck-Tick	Released: January 29, 2020; Label: Victor; Formats: CD	12	13
"—" denotes a recording released before the creation of the Billboard chart.

== V.A. Compilations ==
Year	Title	Album details	Song(s)	Oricon
1994	Real Techno Intelligence Chapter 1	Released: 1994; Label: BMG/Funhouse; Formats: CD	"Killing (Whisper Mix)"	—
1999	Tribute Spirits	Released: May 1, 1999; Label: Pony Canyon; Formats: CD	"Doubt '99"	1
2007	xxxHolic Sound File	Released: August 22, 2007; Label: BMG Japan; Formats: CD	"Kagerou (TV Version)"	—
2008	Sirius -Tribute to Ueda Gen-	Released: September 24, 2008; Label: Victor; Formats: CD	"Hameln"	—
2010	Romantist - The Stalin, Michiro Endo Tribute Album	Released: December 1, 2010; Label: Sony; Formats: CD	"Omae no Inu ni Naru"	—
2011	Shiki Original Soundtrack	Released: June 1, 2011; Label: Sony; Formats: CD	"Kuchizuke (TV Size)", "Gekka Reijin (TV Size)"	—
"—" denotes a recording that did not chart.

== Singles ==
Year	Title	Single details	Oricon	Album
1986	"To-Search"	Released: October 21, 1986; Label: Taiyo; Formats: 7" Vinyl; Track list: 1. "To-Search"; 2. "Plastic Syndrome Type II"	—	Non-album single
1988	"Just One More Kiss"	Released: October 26, 1988; Label: Victor; Formats: 7" Vinyl, cassette, 8 cm CD; Track list: 1. "Just One More Kiss"; 2. "To-Search"; 3. "Just One More Kiss (Instrumental)"(Cassette edition only); 4. "To-Search (Instrumental)"(Cassette edition only)	6	Taboo
1990	"Aku no Hana" 悪の華	Released: January 24, 1990; Label: Victor; Formats: Cassette, 8 cm CD; Track list: 1. "Aku no Hana"; 2. "Under the Moon Light"	1	Aku no Hana
1991	"Speed" スピード	Released: January 21, 1991; Label: Victor; Formats: 8 cm CD; Track list: 1. "Speed"; 2. "Narcissus"	3	Kurutta Taiyou
1991	"M・A・D"	Released: June 5, 1991; Label: Victor; Formats: 8 cm CD; Track list: 1. "M・A・D"; 2. "Angelic Conversation"	4	Kurutta Taiyou
1991	"Jupiter"	Released: October 30, 1991; Label: Victor; Formats: 8 cm CD; Track list: 1. "Jupiter"; 2. "Sakura"	8	Kurutta Taiyou
1993	"Dress" ドレス	Released: May 21, 1993; Label: Victor; Formats: 8 cm CD; Track list: 1. "Dress"; 2. "Rokugatsu no Okinawa"	5	Darker Than Darkness -Style 93-
1993	"Die"	Released: October 21, 1993; Label: Victor; Formats: 8 cm CD; Track list: 1. "Die"; 2. "Darker Than Darkness (Live)"; 3. "Die (Live)"	10	Darker Than Darkness -Style 93-
1995	"Uta" 唄	Released: March 24, 1995; Label: Victor; Formats: 8 cm CD; Track list: 1. "Uta"; 2. "Kimi he"	4	Six/Nine
1995	"Kodou" 鼓動	Released: March 24, 1995; Label: Victor; Formats: 8 cm CD; Track list: 1. "Kodou"; 2. "Rakuen"	6	Six/Nine
1995	"Mienai Mono o Miyo to Suru Gokai Subete Gokai da" 見えない物を見ようとする誤解 全て誤解だ	Released: September 21, 1995; Label: Victor; Formats: 12 cm CD; Track list: 1. "Mienai Mono o Miyo to Suru Gokai Subete Gokai da" 2. "Kimi no Vanilla"	15	Six/Nine
1996	"Candy" キャンディ	Released: May 22, 1996; Label: Victor; Formats: 8 cm CD; Track list: 1. "Candy"; 2. "Chocolate"	11	Cosmos
1997	"Heroine" ヒロイン	Released: November 12, 1997; Label: Mercury; Formats: 8 cm CD; Track list: 1. "Heroine"; 2. "Rasenchu --Tapework Mix--"	11	Sexy Stream Liner
1998	"Sasayaki" 囁き	Released: March 11, 1998; Label: Mercury; Formats: 12 cm CD; Track list: 1. "Sasayaki"; 2. "Thanatos -The Japanic Pig Mix"; 3. "My Fuckin' Valentine -Enemy Mix (Full)-"; 4. "Schiz.o Genso -The Spiderman Mix-"	25	Sexy Stream Liner
1998	"Gessekai" 月世界	Released: May 13, 1998; Label: Mercury; Formats: 12 cm CD; Track list: 1. "Gessekai"; 2. "My Baby Japanese"; 3. "Muchi no Namida Hot Remix #001 for B-T"	18	Non-album single
1999	"Bran-New Lover"	Released: July 14, 1999; Label: Mercury; Formats: 12 cm CD; Track list: 1. "Bran-New Lover"; 2. "Down"; 3. "Asylum Garden"	17	Non-album single
1999	"Miu" ミウ	Released: October 20, 1999; Label: Mercury; Formats: 12 cm CD; Track list: 1. "Miu"; 2. "Paradise"; 3. "Bran-New Lover -Custom-"	15	Non-album single
2000	"Glamorous"	Released: September 6, 2000; Label: BMG/Funhouse; Formats: 12 cm CD; Track list: 1. "Glamorous"; 2. "Trans"	17	One Life, One Death
2001	"21st Cherry Boy"	Released: November 21, 2001; Label: BMG/Funhouse; Formats: 12 cm CD; Track list: 1. "21st Cherry Boy"; 2. "Barairo no Hibi"	25	Kyokutou I Love You
2002	"Kyokutou Yori Ai no Komete" 極東より愛を込めて	Released: February 20, 2002; Label: BMG/Funhouse; Formats: 12 cm CD; Track list: 1. "Kyokutou Yori Ai no Komete"; 2. "Oukoku Kingdom Come -Moon Set-"; 3. "Megami (Designed by Oval)"	24	Kyokutou I Love You
2003	"Zangai" 残骸	Released: January 18, 2003; Label: BMG/Funhouse; Formats: 12 cm CD; Track list: 1. "Zangai"; 2. "Girl"	5	Mona Lisa Overdrive
2003	"Gensou no Hana" 幻想の花	Released: December 3, 2003; Label: BMG/Funhouse; Formats: 12 cm CD; Track list: 1. "Gensou no Hana"; 2. "Nocturne -Rain Song-"; 3. "Gensou no Hana (Live)"(Limited edition bonus track)	11	Non-album single
2005	"Romance"	Released: March 2, 2005; Label: BMG/Funhouse; Formats: 12 cm CD; Track list: 1. "Romance"; 2. "Diabolo"	14	Juusankai wa Gekkou
2005	"Dress (Bloody Trinity Mix)" ドレス(bloody trinity mix)	Released: April 20, 2005; Label: Victor; Formats: 12 cm CD; Track list: 1. "Dress (Bloody Trinity Mix)"; 2. "Rokugatsu no Okinawa (Live)"; 3. "Yuuwaku (Live)"; 4. "Zero (Live)"; 5. "Dress (Live)"	24	Non-album single
2006	"Kagerou" 蜉蝣 -かげろう-	Released: August 2, 2006; Label: BMG Japan; Formats: 12 cm CD; Track list: 1. "Kagerou"; 2. "Utsusemi"	17	Non-album single
2007	"Rendezvous"; RENDEZVOUS ～ランデヴー～	Released: June 6, 2007; Label: BMG Japan; Formats: 12 cm CD; Track list: 1. "Rendezvous"; 2. "My Eyes & Your Eyes"(Re-recording)	9	Tenshi no Revolver
2007	"Alice in Wonder Underground"	Released: August 8, 2007; Label: BMG Japan; Formats: 12 cm CD; Track list: 1. "Alice in Wonder Underground"; 2. "Tight Rope"(Re-recording)	18	Tenshi no Revolver
2008	"Heaven"	Released: December 12, 2008; Label: BMG Japan; Formats: 12 cm CD; Track list: 1. "Heaven"; 2. "Makka na Yoru"	5	Memento Mori
2009	"Galaxy"	Released: January 14, 2009; Label: BMG Japan; Formats: 12 cm CD; Track list: 1. "Galaxy"; 2. "Serenade -Itoshi no Umbrella-"	6	Memento Mori
2010	"Dokudanjou Beauty" 独壇場 Beauty	Released: March 24, 2010; Label: Ariola Japan; Formats: 12 cm CD; Track list: 1. "Dokudanjou Beauty"; 2. "Voo Doo"; 3. "Tenshi wa Dare da (Live Ver.)"	7	Razzle Dazzle
2010	"Kuchizuke" くちづけ	Released: September 1, 2010; Label: Ariola Japan; Formats: 12 cm CD; Track list: 1. "Kuchizuke"; 2. "Yougetsu -Yougetsu-"; 3. "Kuchizuke (Skiki TV Size)"(Special edition bonus track)	7	Razzle Dazzle
2012	"Elise no Tame ni" エリーゼのために	Released: May 23, 2012; Label: Lingua Sounda/Tokuma Japan Communications; Formats: 12 cm CD; Track list: 1. "Elise no Tame ni" 2. "Yume Miru Uchuu"; 3. "Sane -Type II-"(Re-recording)	11	Yume Miru Uchuu
2012	"Miss Take ~Boku wa Miss Take~"; MISS TAKE 〜僕はミス・テイク〜	Released: July 4, 2012; Label: Lingua Sounda/Tokuma Japan Communications; Formats: 12 cm CD; Track list: 1. "Miss Take ~Boku wa Miss Take~"; 2. "Only You"; 3. "My Baby Japanese -Type II-"(Re-recording)	11	Yume Miru Uchuu
2014	"Love Parade/Steppers -Parade-"	Released: January 22, 2014; Label: Lingua Sounda/Tokuma Japan Communications; Formats: 12 cm CD; Track list: 1. "Love Parade"; 2. "Steppers -Parade-"	9	Non-album single
2014	"Keijijou Ryusei" 形而上 流星	Released: May 14, 2014; Label: Lingua Sounda/Tokuma Japan Communications; Formats: 12 cm CD; Track list: 1. "Keijijou Ryusei"; 2. "Melancholia -Electria-"; 3. "Victims of Love with Kokusyoku Sumire"	10	Arui wa Anarchy
2016	"New World"	Released: September 21, 2016; Label: Lingua Sounda/Victor; Formats: 12 cm CD; Track list: 1. "New World"; 2. "Devil's Wings -Type 2-"	10	Atom Miraiha No.9
2017	"Babel"	Released: November 15, 2017; Label: Lingua Sounda/Victor; Formats: 12 cm CD; Track list: 1. "Babel"; 2. "Moon Sayonara wo Oshiete (Takkyu Ishino Remix)"	11	No.0
2018	"Moon Sayonara wo Oshiete"; Moon さよならを教えて	Released: February 21, 2018; Label: Lingua Sounda/Victor; Formats: 12 cm CD; Track list: 1. "Moon Sayonara wo Oshiete"; 2. "Salome"	14	No.0
2019	"Kemonotachi no Yoru/Rondo" 獣たちの夜/RONDO	Released: May 22, 2019; Label: Lingua Sounda/Victor; Formats: 12 cm CD; Track list: 1. "Kemonotachi no Yoru"; 2. "Rondo"; 3. "Kemonotachi no Yoru -Version of Cube Juice-"	4	Abracadabra
2020	"Datenshi" 堕天使	Released: January 29, 2020; Label: Lingua Sounda/Victor; Formats: 12 cm CD; Track list: 1. "Datenshi"; 2. "Luna Park"	6	Abracadabra
2020	"Moonlight Escape"	Released: August 26, 2020; Label: Lingua Sounda/Victor; Formats: 12 cm CD; Track list: 1. "Moonlight Escape"; 2. "Kogoeru"	13	Abracadabra
2021	"Go-Go B-T Train"	Released: September 22, 2021; Label: Lingua Sounda/Victor; Formats: 12 cm CD; Track list: 1. "Go-Go B-T Train"; 2. "Koi"; 3. "Uta Ver. 2021"; 4. "Just One More Kiss Ver. 2021"	5	Non-album single
2023	"Taiyou to Ikaros" 太陽とイカロス	Released: March 18, 2023; Label: Lingua Sounda/Victor; Formats: 12 cm CD; Track list: 1. "Taiyou to Ikaros"; 2. "Namonaki Watashi -Kachoufuugetsu Remix-" 名も無きわたし -花鳥風月REMIX-	10	Izora
2023	"Mugen Loop" 無限 LOOP	Released: March 22, 2023; Label: Lingua Sounda/Victor; Formats: 12 cm CD; Track list: 1. "Mugen Loop"; 2. "Mugen Loop -Leap-"	10	Izora
2024	"Raijin Fūjin - Resonance" 雷神 風神 - レゾナンス	Released: November 20, 2024; Label: Lingua Sounda/Victor; Formats: CD; Track list: 1. "Raijin Fūjin - Resonance"; 2. "Raijin Fūjin - Resonance (Pasocom Music Club Remix)"	2	Subrosa
2025	"Mabushikute Mienai/Freedom Freedom Paradise Lost" 眩しくて 視えない / フリーダム フリーダム パラダイスロスト	Released: March 12, 2025; Label: Lingua Sounda/Victor; Formats: Digital; Track list: 1. "Mabushikute Mienai"; 2. "Freedom Freedom Paradise Lost"	—	Non-album singles
2025	"Shibuya Hurry Upper!" 渋谷ハリアッパ!	Released: October 15, 2025; Label: Lingua Sounda/Victor; Formats: CD; Track list: 1. "Shibuya Hurry Upper"; 2. "Kaze no Prologue"	8	Non-album singles
"—" denotes a recording that did not chart.

== Videos ==
Title	VHS release date	Beta release date	LD release date	VHS-C release date	DVD release date	Blu-ray release date	Label	Oricon DVDs	Oricon Blu-rays
Buck-Tick Phenomenon Live at the Live Inn バクチク現象 at THE LIVE INN	September 21, 1987	September 21, 1987	—	—	December 26, 2012	December 26, 2012	Victor	—	—
More Sexual!!!!!	February 21, 1988	February 21, 1988	—	—	—	—	Victor	—	—
Sabbat I	April 21, 1989	—	—	—	—	—	Victor	—	—
Sabbat II	April 21, 1989	—	—	—	—	—	Victor	—	—
Sabbat	March 19, 2003	—	April 21, 1989	—	March 19, 2003, December 26, 2012	December 26, 2012	Victor	36	—
Aku no Hana 悪の華	April 1, 1990	—	April 1, 1990	—	—	—	Victor	—	—
M・A・D	June 5, 1991	—	June 5, 1991	June 5, 1991	—	—	Victor	—	—
Buck-Tick	November 21, 1991	—	November 21, 1991	—	—	—	Victor	—	—
Climax Together	December 2, 1992	—	—	—	September 10, 2003	December 26, 2012	Victor	11	—
Catalogue 1987–1995	December 1, 1995	—	—	—	May 23, 2001	—	Victor	—	—
Sweet Strange Live Film	August 12, 1998	—	—	—	December 14, 2005	—	Mercury, Universal	76	—
Dream Box	November 26, 1999	—	—	—	—	—	Mercury	—	—
One Life, One Death Cut Up	March 28, 2001	—	—	—	March 28, 2001	July 6, 2022	BMG/Funhouse	24	—
Picture Product	March 21, 2002	—	—	—	March 21, 2002	—	Victor	12	—
Tour 2002 Warp Days 20020616 Bay NK Hall	December 4, 2002	—	—	—	December 4, 2002	July 6, 2022	BMG/Funhouse	18	—
Picture Product II	—	—	—	—	June 25, 2003	—	BMG/Funhouse	23	—
Mona Lisa Overdrive -Xanadu-	—	—	—	—	December 3, 2003	July 6, 2022	BMG/Funhouse	21	—
At the Night Side	—	—	—	—	April 21, 2004	July 6, 2022	BMG/Funhouse	16	—
Akuma to Freud -Devil and Freud- Climax Together 悪魔とフロイト -Devil and Freud- Climax Together	—	—	—	—	December 22, 2004	July 6, 2022	BMG/Funhouse	37	—
13th Floor With Diana	—	—	—	—	December 14, 2005	July 6, 2022	BMG Japan	20	—
Singles on Digital Video Disc	—	—	—	—	February 15, 2006	—	Victor	17	—
Buck-Tick Fest 2007 On Parade	—	—	—	—	April 2, 2008	—	BMG Japan	48	—
Tour 2007 Tenshi no Revolver; TOUR 2007 天使のリボルバー	—	—	—	—	May 7, 2008	July 6, 2022	BMG Japan	11	—
Memento Mori 090702	—	—	—	—	December 23, 2009	December 23, 2009	Ariola Japan	32	—
Tour 2010 Go on the "Razzle Dazzle"	—	—	—	—	April 6, 2011	April 6, 2011	Ariola Japan	19	—
The Day in Question 2011	—	—	—	—	May 23, 2012	May 23, 2012	Lingua Sounda	5	—
B-T Live Product -1987/1989/1992 Victor Years-	—	—	—	—	—	December 26, 2012	Victor	—	26
Buck-Tick Fest 2012 On Parade	—	—	—	—	February 20, 2013	February 20, 2013	Lingua Sounda/Tokuma Japan Communications	22	—
Tour Yume Miru Uchuu; TOUR 夢見る宇宙	—	—	—	—	May 15, 2013	May 15, 2013	Lingua Sounda/Tokuma Japan Communications	9	4
Gekijō-ban Buck-Tick ~Buck-Tick Phenomenon~ 劇場版BUCK-TICK ～バクチク現象～	—	—	—	—	January 22, 2014	January 22, 2014	Lingua Sounda/Tokuma Japan Communications	—	—
Tour 2014 Arui wa Anarchy -Final- TOUR2014 或いはアナー キ -FINAL-	—	—	—	—	February 25, 2015	February 25, 2015	Lingua Sounda/Tokuma Japan Communications	20	19
Tour Atom Miraiha No. 9 -Final- TOUR アトム 未来派 No.9 -FINAL-	—	—	—	—	April 26, 2017	April 26, 2017	Lingua Sounda/Victor	17	15
Climax Together on Screen 1992-2016 / Climax Together 3rd	—	—	—	—	June 27, 2018	June 27, 2018	Lingua Sounda/Victor	12	14
The Parade ~30th Anniversary~	—	—	—	—	September 21, 2018	September 21, 2018	Lingua Sounda/Victor	5	6
The Day in Question 2017	—	—	—	—	December 26, 2018	December 26, 2018	Lingua Sounda/Victor	18	15
Tour No. 0	—	—	—	—	April 24, 2019	April 24, 2019	Lingua Sounda/Victor	13	13
Locus Solus no Kemonotachi ロクス・ソルスの獣たち	—	—	—	—	November 20, 2019	November 20, 2019	Lingua Sounda/Victor	7	5
B-T Live Product -Ariola Years-	—	—	—	—	—	March 18, 2020	Ariola Japan	—	18
Tour 2020 Abracadabra on Screen / Abracadabra Live on the Net	—	—	—	—	August 18, 2021	August 18, 2021	Lingua Sounda/Victor	5	11
Abracadabra The Day in Question 2020	—	—	—	—	December 29, 2021	December 29, 2021	Lingua Sounda/Victor	4	10
Misemonogoya ga Kurete Kara ~Show After Dark~ 魅世物小屋が暮れてから〜SHOW AFTER DARK〜	—	—	—	—	March 7, 2022	March 7, 2022	Lingua Sounda/Victor	6	8
Misemonogoya ga Kurete Kara ~Show After Dark~ in Nippon Budokan 魅世物小屋が暮れてから〜SHOW AFTER DARK〜 in 日本武道館	—	—	—	—	September 21, 2022	September 21, 2022	Victor	7	12
The Parade -35th Anniversary-	—	—	—	—	September 13, 2023	September 13, 2023	Victor	3	4
Tour the Best 35th Anniv. Finalo in Budokan	—	—	—	—	December 13, 2023	December 13, 2023	Victor	3	2
Tour 2023 Izora 0723 Tokyo Garden Theater	—	—	—	—	March 7, 2024	March 7, 2024	Victor	2	4
Buck-Tick Phenomenon -2023- バクチク現象-2023-	—	—	—	—	August 21, 2024	August 21, 2024	Victor	2	2
Buck-Tick the Movie: Buck-Tick Phenomenon - New World- 劇場版BUCK-TICK バクチク現象 - New World -	—	—	—	—	March 12, 2025	March 12, 2025	Victor	3	3
Naisho no Bara no Shita 2024 ナイショの薔薇の下 2024	—	—	—	—	September 24, 2025	September 24, 2025	Victor	8	7
Tour 2025 Subrosa; TOUR 2025 スブロサ SUBROSA	—	—	—	—	December 24, 2025	December 24, 2025	Victor	—	—
