= Catalogue 1987–1995 =

Compilation album by Buck-Tick
- Released: December 1, 1995; September 5, 2007 (remaster)
- Genre: Alternative rock; punk rock; post-punk; gothic rock; industrial rock; power pop
- Label: Victor

Buck-Tick chronology
| Six/Nine (1995) | Catalogue 1987–1995 (1995) | Cosmos (1996) |

Catalogue 1987–1995 is a compilation album by Buck-Tick, released on December 1, 1995. It compiles every single the band released while signed to Victor Entertainment, with the exception of "Candy", in release order. The album reached number eight on the Oricon chart and was certified gold in the month of its release.

A video version with the corresponding music videos to the songs was also released on VHS simultaneously, eventually a DVD version was released on May 23, 2001, this time including the music video for "Candy" as a bonus track. The album was later remastered and re-released on CD on September 5, 2007, also including "Candy" as a bonus track.

== Track listing ==
All lyrics are written by Atsushi Sakurai; all music is composed by Hisashi Imai except where noted.

| No. | Title | Original album | Length |
|---|---|---|---|
| 1. | "Just One More Kiss" | Taboo | 5:04 |
| 2. | "Aku no Hana" (悪の華; Evil Flower) | Aku no Hana | 4:13 |
| 3. | "Speed" (スピード) | Kurutta Taiyou | 4:51 |
| 4. | "M・A・D" | Kurutta Taiyou | 4:25 |
| 5. | "Jupiter" (music written by Hidehiko Hoshino) | Kurutta Taiyou | 4:37 |
| 6. | "Dress" (ドレス; music written by Hoshino) | Darker Than Darkness: Style 93 | 5:58 |
| 7. | "Die" | Darker Than Darkness: Style 93 | 4:26 |
| 8. | "Uta" (唄; Song) | Six/Nine | 4:03 |
| 9. | "Kodou" (鼓動; Heartbeat) | Six/Nine | 6:24 |
| 10. | "Mienai Mono wo Miyou to Suru Gokai Subete Gokai da" (見えない物を見ようとする誤解 全て誤解だ; Misunderstanding in Trying to See the Invisible, Everything Is Misunderstood) | Six/Nine | 4:39 |
| Total length: | | | 48:44 |

2007 digital remaster bonus track
| No. | Title | Original album | Length |
|---|---|---|---|
| 11. | "Candy" (キャンディ) | Cosmos | 4:26 |
| Total length: | | | 53:10 |

== Personnel ==
- Atsushi Sakurai - lead vocals
- Hisashi Imai - lead guitar
- Hidehiko Hoshino - rhythm guitar, keyboards
- Yutaka Higuchi - bass
- Toll Yagami - drums
