= Shapeless =

シェイプレス Shapeless

Remix album by Buck-Tick
- Released: August 24, 1994
- Genre: Ambient techno; EDM
- Label: Victor

Buck-Tick chronology
Darker Than Darkness -style93- (1993)	シェイプレス; Shapeless (1994)	Six/Nine (1995)

Shapeless (Japanese: シェイプレス, Hepburn: Sheipuresu) is a remix album by Buck-Tick, released on August 24, 1994. All songs were remixed by European artists, and some song titles are translated into English. It reached number five on the Oricon chart.

== Track listing ==
1. "Jupiter (Silver Moon Mix)" remixed by Peter Smith and Jon Tye
2. "D.T.D (Air Liquide Mix)" remixed by Ingmar Koch (Air Liquide)
3. "In the Glitter Pt 1 (Glitter Mix)" remixed by Dominic Woosey (Neutron 9000)
4. "Brain, Whisper, Head, Hate Is Noise" remixed by Richard Kirk (Cabaret Voltaire)
5. "Iconoclasm (Don't X Ray Da DAT Mix)" remixed by Autechre
6. "In the Glitter Pt 2 (Aphex Mix)" remixed by Aphex Twin
7. "Killing (Urb Mix)" remixed by Jon Tye
8. "Evil Flowers (Neutron 9000 Mix)" remixed by Dominic Woosey (Neutron 9000)
9. "Dress (Spicelab Mix)" remixed by Oliver Lieb
10. "Hyper Love (Hardfloor Remix)" remixed by Hardfloor
