= Buck-Tick =

Japanese rock band

Background information
- Also known as: B-T, Hinan Go-Go (非難GO-GO)
- Origin: Fujioka, Gunma, Japan
- Genres: Gothic rock; alternative rock; industrial rock; post-punk; punk rock
- Works: Buck-Tick discography
- Years active: 1983–present
- Labels: Taiyo; Victor; Mercury; BMG; Ariola Japan; Lingua Sounda/Tokuma Japan; Lingua Sounda/JVC Kenwood Victor
- Members: Hisashi Imai; Hidehiko Hoshino; Yutaka Higuchi; Toll Yagami
- Past members: Araki; Atsushi Sakurai
- Website: www.buck-tick.com

Buck-Tick (stylized as BUCK∞TICK) is a Japanese rock band formed in Fujioka, Gunma in 1983. The classic lineup of lead vocalist Atsushi Sakurai, lead guitarist Hisashi Imai, rhythm guitarist Hidehiko Hoshino, bassist Yutaka Higuchi and drummer Toll Yagami lasted from 1985 until 2023. Following Sakurai's death that year, Imai and Hoshino began sharing lead vocal duties. The band has experimented with many different genres of music throughout their four decade career, including punk rock, gothic rock and industrial rock. Buck-Tick are commonly credited as one of the main founders of the visual kei movement.

The band has released twenty-four studio albums and forty-six singles as of February 2026, nearly all reaching the top ten and twenty positions on the Japanese Oricon charts. Buck-Tick released both their debut independent and major studio albums in 1987, and achieved breakthrough success the following year with the album Seventh Heaven (#3) and the single "Just One More Kiss". In 1989, Taboo became their first number-one album. It was followed by several successful albums almost all of which topped the charts, Aku no Hana (1990, which includes the song of the same name; the band's only number-one single), Kurutta Taiyou (1991), Darker Than Darkness: Style 93 (1993), Six/Nine (1995), as well as the remixed album Hurry Up Mode (1990 Mix) and the compilation album Koroshi no Shirabe: This Is Not Greatest Hits (1992).

Buck-Tick reached their commercial peak in the mid-1990s (when they were dubbed a "top rock act" by Billboard), but unlike other acts in the visual kei movement, they never ceased activities or faded into obscurity. The band has continued to tour and record regularly in the subsequent decades, and their last five studio albums between Arui wa Anarchy (2014) and Izora (2023) all reached the top six positions on the Oricon and Billboard Japan charts, making them a rare example in Japanese music history and earning them a special "Inspiration Award Japan" at the 2017 MTV Video Music Awards Japan.

== History ==
=== 1983–1985: Formation ===
Buck-Tick was formed in Gunma Prefecture in 1983. Hisashi Imai had the original idea for the band, despite not being able to play any instruments at the time. He recruited his friend, Yutaka Higuchi, and the two of them began to practice—Imai on guitar and Higuchi on bass. Then, Higuchi asked Hidehiko Hoshino, who had been his friend since their first year of high school, to join. Higuchi tried to convince Hoshino to become the vocalist because of his looks, but Hoshino was more interested in playing the guitar, and did not want to be in the spotlight, so Imai's friend Araki became the vocalist instead. Atsushi Sakurai, a rebellious loner in Imai's class who hung out with the bad-kid yankī crowd, volunteered to be the drummer. The members all went to Gunma Kenritsu Fujioka High School, the same high school that Kyosuke Himuro of fellow Gunma band Boøwy had attended.

Imai named their band Hinan Go-Go (非難GO-GO; "Criticism Go-Go") in the spring of 1984. Once they had practiced enough to be able to play, they began to perform live at small, local events. They started out playing covers of songs by the famous Japanese punk band The Stalin. From the beginning, they were conscious of their image and tried to differentiate themselves from other bands. They performed in suits with their hair up and soon added white face makeup, as well.

When Imai graduated high school, he moved to Tokyo with Araki and enrolled in a design school. Sakurai's parents would not let him move to the capital. However, Imai and Araki returned home on weekends for band practice. During the summer of 1984, Hinan Go-Go changed their name to Buck-Tick, which is a creative spelling of "bakuchiku" (爆竹), the Japanese word for firecracker. They also began to write original songs, most written by Imai and a few by Hoshino. When Higuchi and Hoshino graduated in 1985, they also moved to Tokyo—Higuchi for business school and Hoshino for culinary school. The band's first concert under their new name was on August 4, 1985 at Shinjuku Jam in Tokyo.

But drummer Sakurai had his mind set on becoming a singer. Higuchi's brother Toll Yagami was in a band called SP, and when they lost their vocalist, Sakurai asked Yagami if he could be the replacement. Yagami politely refused his request, and SP broke up. However, at the same time, the rest of Buck-Tick were becoming frustrated with Araki. As Imai's composing skills improved, Araki became unable to carry the melodies to the songs. The band decided to fire Araki, his last concert was an event titled Beat for Beat for Beat Vol. 1 in November 1985, and Sakurai convinced them to accept him as their vocalist. Higuchi convinced Yagami that the best way for him to get over the loss of his own band was to join theirs instead, thus Toll took Sakurai's place behind the drums, completing Buck-Tick's classic lineup. The new lineup had their first concert at Beat for Beat for Beat Vol. 2 at Shinjuku Jam in December 1985.

=== 1985–1988: Independent period and major label debut ===
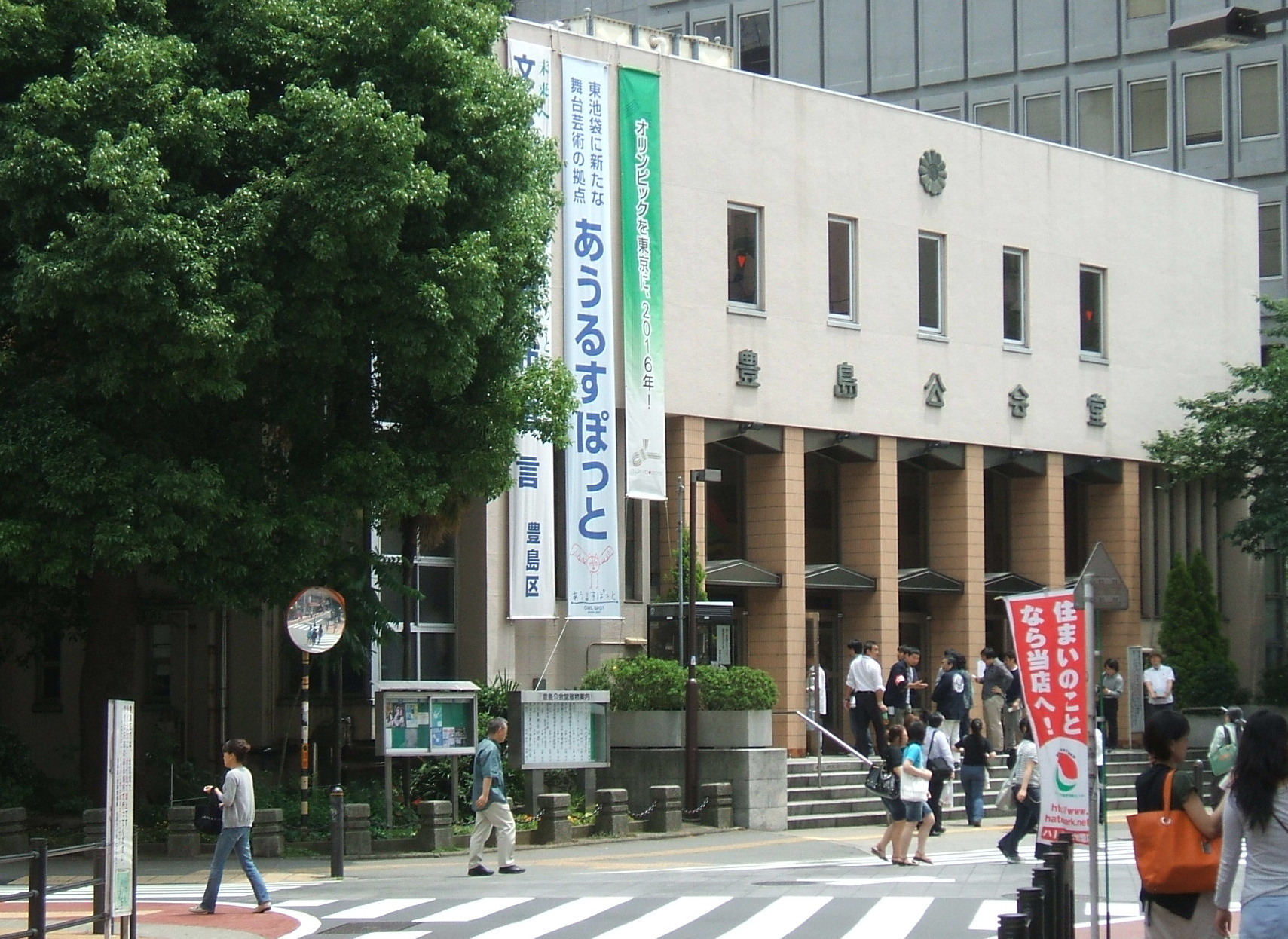
An April 1987 concert at Toshima Public Hall (pictured in 2008) earned the band a record deal with Victor Entertainment.

When Sakurai's father died, he too moved to Tokyo and Buck-Tick became more serious about music. The five members worked during the day and practiced and performed at night. In July 1986, they attracted the attention of Kazuo Sawaki, head of Taiyo Records, an independent label. He had seen the band perform at a live house called Shinjuku Attic, and had been very impressed. The band signed to Taiyo immediately and released their debut single, "To-Search" on October 21 of the same year.

With Sawaki's help they began promoting themselves very actively, playing the live house circuit in Tokyo. On April 1, 1987, the band released their first album, Hurry Up Mode. In conjunction with its release, they played a concert titled Buck-Tick Phenomenon (バクチク現象, Bakuchiku Genshō) at Toshima Public Hall in Ikebukuro that same day. Everyone in the local music scene believed the hall was too large for the band and that the concert would be doomed to failure, but Buck-Tick used an advertising strategy that involved pasting thousands of eye-catching, black-and-white sticker advertisements all over Tokyo's hip youth districts that read simply "Buck-Tick Phenomenon April 1st Toshima Public Hall". Their staff members were nearly arrested for defacement of public property. But the strategy worked, as Buck-Tick sold 400 tickets in advance, and another 400 on the day of the show. After this success, major labels began to be interested in the band.

Although major labels had begun scouting the band, Buck-Tick wanted to continue pursuing music on their own terms and refused to sign unless the label would agree to their four conditions: first, that the band would be able to make their own decisions about their hair, makeup, clothing, and general image; second, that they would never be forced to change the band lineup; third, that they would never be forced to use session musicians for recordings; and last, that they would be able to do all of their own production work. Most record companies refused the idea of accepting such demands from a new band, but Junichi Tanaka of Victor Entertainment decided to accept their terms. He did so after attending the Buck-Tick Phenomenon concert. Tanaka later described his initial impression of them after first seeing them perform at the Taiyo Matsuri in September 1986; "I was more attracted to Buck-Tick than any other band I saw at the time, even though they were the worst of all the bands I saw." Additionally, Takeshi Takagaki of Victor Invitation offered them the company's Aoyama studio as a place to practice.

On June 16, 1987, the band held Buck-Tick Phenomenon II at the Live Inn in Shibuya to bid farewell to their indie days. A home video of the concert, Buck-Tick Phenomenon Live at the Live Inn, was later released on September 21 as their major label debut, reaching No. 4 on the Oricon video charts. On September 3, Buck-Tick opened their personal administrative office, which they named Shaking Hands, Inc., in honor of all the musical connections they hoped to make in the future. Soon after, they embarked on their first national tour. They released their first major label album, Sexual XXXXX! on November 21, and it climbed to No. 33 on the Oricon charts. Although a good result for a new band, the album was not well-received and the group also faced accusations of "selling out".

Buck-Tick had become popular enough that they could only play at large halls now. They missed small live houses, so they organized a secret gig under the false name "Bluck-Tlick" at Shinjuku Loft on January 24, 1988. The alias was taken from a shōjo manga that was based on themselves, and they used it as an opportunity to play their older songs. They released the EP Romanesque on March 21. Having now recorded all of the songs they had, production of their third studio album was more difficult. However, Seventh Heaven peaked at number three on the chart when it was released on June 21, 1988. It was Tanaka's idea to release three albums and no singles in their first two years at Victor.

=== 1988–1990: Taboo, brief hiatus, and Aku no Hana ===
"Just One More Kiss"
A 30-second sample of "Just One More Kiss", the band's major debut single that received mainstream success, from Taboo (1988)

Buck-Tick's first major label single "Just One More Kiss", became their first hit in October 1988. The band made their first live television appearance the following month performing it on the popular music program Music Station. The song was also used in a series of television commercials in which the band appeared advertising Victor's CDian Stereo, with the slogan "The super bass will firecracker" (a pun on Buck-Tick's name, which means "firecracker"). The lengthy Seventh Heaven tour also began in October and ran until the end of December. It was on this tour that the band became conscious of their stage shows, and the first where they employed stage risers so that each member could be seen from a distance. At the end of the year, Buck-Tick were one of the recipients of the Newcomer Award at the 30th Japan Record Awards, which also made them nominees for Best New Artist.

Taboo, the band's fourth studio album, was previously recorded in London in September 1988 with producer Owen Paul. The band had also played a gig there, at the Greyhound music club, and amongst those who attended were members of the band Der Zibet, who were also recording in London at the time. The members of Buck-Tick loved London, especially Sakurai, who felt that the music scene there was more welcoming of dark and serious music. With the album, the band broke into a darker, more serious sound which took a fair amount of criticism from members of the Japanese music scene who had previously thought of Buck-Tick as little more than idols. However, it became the band's first to reach number one on the charts when it was released on January 18, 1989. The following two days marked the end of the Seventh Heaven tour with the band's first concerts at the Nippon Budokan, which were recorded for the two-part concert video Sabbat.

On March 22, 1989, the band started the Taboo tour. At this point they had stopped putting their hair up that extensively, and Sakurai had even given up on dyeing his. The tour was scheduled to run to the end of May, but it was cancelled abruptly when Imai was arrested for LSD possession in April. The incident was covered in newspapers and tabloids at the time, but since, the band has kept it very quiet. Buck-Tick went on hiatus and Imai had to appear at a court hearing, which was attended by hundreds of concerned fans and was covered on television. The guitarist was given a suspended sentence, and the band's agency was flooded with fan letters pleading for them not to disband. The band held a press conference in July, where they announced that Buck-Tick is the five members, and that none of them could be replaced.

With a now wide-open schedule, Buck-Tick went back into the studio in the fall of 1989 and recorded their next studio album. They played their first concert since Imai's arrest at the Gunma Music Center in their home prefecture on December 20. Nine days later, they played a Buck-Tick Phenomenon concert at the Tokyo Dome in front of 43,000 people, the largest concert the band had ever played up to that point. Nearly every year since, Buck-Tick have held a large concert at the end of December, usually at the Nippon Budokan, to celebrate the anniversary of their reunion after Imai's arrest. Since 2001, they have named these concerts The Day in Question, and the shows have often been broadcast live on TV.

On January 24, 1990, the band released "Aku no Hana", which became their first single to reach number one. The album Aku no Hana followed on February 1, and went much further into the dark and gothic image they had begun to explore on Taboo and which would later become their trademark. It was named after French poet Charles Baudelaire's Les Fleurs du Mal because it deals with similar themes. It became their second consecutive number one album and remains the group's best-selling to date. One week later, a new mix of Hurry Up Mode was released and also topped the charts. The Aku no Hana tour began in March, and lasted approximately four months with 51 concerts, prioritizing locations that were cancelled during the Taboo tour. In the summer, the album Symphonic Buck-Tick in Berlin was released on July 21, featuring orchestral versions of some of their songs performed by the Berlin Chamber Orchestra. Buck-Tick's first solo outdoor concerts, named A Midsummer Night's Dream, followed on August 2 and 5. An eight-date arena tour titled 5 for Japanese Babies was held in December.

=== 1990–1995: Kurutta Taiyou and continuing musical maturity ===
In the fall of 1990, Buck-Tick went back to the studio to work on their sixth studio album, Kurutta Taiyou. They spent 800 hours making it, much more than any of their previous albums. The difference was noticeable as the sound is much deeper and more sophisticated, using many more studio production effects than they did previously. It was at this point that the direction of the band began to change subtly, as Sakurai began to write almost all of the lyrics. Sakurai's mother, whom he had been very close to, died, and due to the band's busy touring schedule, he was unable to visit her before the end. In interviews, the singer said that the pain he felt from these events strongly influenced his lyrics, and that this was when he started writing about real emotions, rather than what he thought was cool. Subsequently, he changed the first kanji in his name from the standard character "桜" ("sakura") to the older version "櫻", and from then on brought a continuously evolving sense of melancholy and psychological depth to the band's lyrics.

Kurutta Taiyou was released on February 21, 1991. Three singles were released, "Speed", "M・A・D" and "Jupiter". Four days after the release of the album, the band performed a unique concert called Satellite Circuit, which was recorded in a studio with no audience and then broadcast on television and at special concert halls around the country. The album's lengthy tour ended in June 1991. In November and December, the Club Quattro Buck-Tick tour saw them play three dates at the titular small live houses in Tokyo, Nagoya and Osaka. At the end of the year, Kurutta Taiyou earned the band a nomination for Best Album at the 33rd Japan Record Awards.

1992 marked the fifth anniversary of Buck-Tick's major label debut. While a "best-of" compilation album was considered to celebrate the occasion, some members of the band wanted to create a new album. They instead released the self-cover album Koroshi no Shirabe: This Is Not Greatest Hits in March. The band had spent many hours in the studio re-recording, and in some cases radically changing, songs they had previously released. After the album's three-month-long tour ran from March to May, the band took a break to plan their next move. A two-day live event called Climax Together was held at Yokohama Arena on September 10 and 11. The event had been put together specifically to be filmed with innovative camera angles, and great care was taken with the lighting and design—for greater dramatic effect, the stage was even set up along the long side of the hall and obscured by a gigantic scrim which was dropped partway through the set.

"Dress"
28-second sample of "Dress", a single from 1993's Darker Than Darkness: Style 93. A remixed version of the song was released as a single twelve years later.

On May 21, 1993, Buck-Tick released the single "Dress", which would later be released in a new mix in 2005 and used as the opening theme for the Trinity Blood anime. Soon after, on June 23, they released their seventh studio album, Darker Than Darkness: Style 93; a loose concept album focusing on death. The album confused fans because after the last track (track 10), the CD skips and picks up at track 75 and then 84, both of which are strange buzzing noises, before skipping one last time to track 93, a hidden song. This technique was rare in Japan at that time, and apparently some fans tried to return their CDs to stores, claiming that they were broken. On the album, the band also began to experiment with different instruments—Hoshino played keyboards, and during live shows, Sakurai tried his hand at the saxophone. Both Hoshino and Sakurai played these instruments on the band's next album. The Darker Than Darkness: Style 93 tour is the longest of the band's career, with 59 performances in 50 locations between May and November. On December 31, 1993, Buck-Tick and Soft Ballet played a special concert for TVK at Shibuya Public Hall called Live Gaga Special, which was broadcast live.

Buck-Tick was largely inactive in 1994, although the members worked on other projects. Sakurai and Hoshino contributed to the solo album of Der Zibet's vocalist Issay, Yagami and Higuchi performed separate gigs with Shigeru Nakano, while Imai's side-project Schaft (initially formed in 1991 with Maki Fujii of Soft Ballet) released their first album Switchblade. Buck-Tick performed two outdoor shows at Fuji-Q Highland Conifer Forest on July 31 and August 7, the second of which also featured Soft Ballet and The Mad Capsule Markets. The album Shapeless was released in August and features ambient remixes of Buck-Tick songs by international artist such as Aphex Twin and Autechre. Buck-Tick went on the sold-out, five-stop LSB tour with Luna Sea and Soft Ballet between August 9 and 30, 1994. It is now looked at as a legendary tour in Japanese rock, not only due to the three headlining acts coming together, but because the then up-and-coming guest acts, The Yellow Monkey, L'Arc-en-Ciel, The Mad Capsule Markets and Die in Cries, all went on to achieve success.

Released on May 15, 1995, Six/Nine was an even more psychological, conceptual album than Darker Than Darkness: Style 93 had been. Before the album was released, the band performed another set of video concerts, featuring equally conceptual music videos for each song, directed by Wataru Hayashi. One of the songs, "Itoshi no Rock Star", featured Issay of Der Zibet on backing vocals, he also appeared with the band on the tour. After the Somewhere Nowhere 1995 Tour was held from May to August, Buck-Tick released Catalogue 1987–1995 on December 1 as their first compilation album.

=== 1996–2003: Label and management changes, "cyberpunk" years ===
After having left Shaking Hands, Buck-Tick started their own management company, Banker Ltd., on January 31, 1996, and appointed Toll as its president. They also started a new fan club, Fish Tank. On June 21, they released their ninth studio album, Cosmos, which featured a brighter sound than was usual for the band and also electronic, cyberpunk-influenced music in such songs as "Living on the Net". Tour 1996 Chaos started in July, and was going to be followed by the Chaos After Dark Tour in December. However, Sakurai fell seriously ill with acute peritonitis while at a photo shoot in Nepal. When he was told how serious his condition was, he wanted to be flown back to Tokyo so that if he died, he could die at home, but once back in Japan "he felt so relieved that he was able to recover". He was hospitalized for about a month.

In 1997, Buck-Tick changed record labels from Victor to Mercury Music Entertainment. The make-up shows for the previous year's postponed concerts began in March, under the title Tour '97 Red Room 2097. On November 12, they released their thirteenth single "Heroin". On December 10, they released the studio album Sexy Stream Liner, marking the maturation of their new cyberpunk style, which emerged in their visual image as well, with the band sporting fake tattoos and electronic gadgetry on their costumes. Imai began to incorporate the use of a theremin into Buck-Tick's live shows and their recordings, beginning with the song "My Fuckin' Valentine". Two concerts were performed at the Nippon Budokan on December 26 and 27, as a prelude to the Tour Sextream Liner, which was held from February 4 to May 9, 1998. The band released the single "Sasayaki" and the EP LTD in March. On May 13, they released the non-album single "Gessekai", which was used as the opening theme to the anime adaptation of Nightwalker: The Midnight Detective. Shortly after this, on the wave of the anime boom, Japanese music began to gain popularity in the West via the internet, and "Gessekai" became the song that first introduced Buck-Tick to many foreign fans. Sweet Strange Live Disc, the band's first live album, was released on August 12, 1998.

"Miu"
A 27-second sample of 1999's "Miu", one of eight of the band's singles not included on a studio album.

Like the second half of 1998, 1999 saw little activity from Buck-Tick. They contributed a cover of "Doubt" to May's hide tribute album Tribute Spirits, released the non-album single "Bran-New Lover" on July 14, and performed at Marilyn Manson's Rock Is Dead Tour (originally scheduled as part of the Beautiful Monsters Tour) on August 8. Their only other concerts of the year were also in August; a show named No Title held at Akasaka Blitz on the 19, and the four-date Energy Void Tour with Pig. "Miu", another non-album single, was released on October 20. In 2000, Buck-Tick changed record labels again, leaving Mercury for BMG Funhouse. Their popularity had been growing overseas, especially in South Korea, and the band went to Korea for the first time. They were greeted enthusiastically by fans at the airport, and held a formal interview, but did not perform live. In September, Buck-Tick released the single "Glamorous", followed by One Life, One Death, their first studio album in nearly three years. That month also saw the beginning of the Phantom Tour of music halls, which led directly into the Other Phantom Tour of live houses in October. They played a three-date tour named after the album in December, with the final concert recorded and later released as the One Life, One Death Cut Up live album and home video.

2001 also saw little activity as Buck-Tick, with only two concerts held. They returned to Korea for the Soyo Rock Festival on July 29, where they were drenched with rain during their set, and held their first Day in Question concert at the Nippon Budokan on December 29. Instead, Sakurai and Imai formed the supergroup Schwein with English and German industrial musicians Raymond Watts and Sascha Konietzko. The quartet released two albums and toured Japan, all within the year. Buck-Tick did however enter the studio in 2001 to record their next album, and released the single "21st Cherry Boy" on November 21.

2002 marked the 15th anniversary of the band's debut. In March, they released the five-disc Picture Product home video, which includes interviews with the members, every music video they made, and a documentary on the band, and in September all of their Victor albums were remastered and re-released. March 6, 2002, saw Buck-Tick release their twelfth studio album, Kyokutou I Love You. It was initially planned to be released as a double album with Mona Lisa Overdrive, which ultimately came out the following year. Musically, the two albums feed into each other in a continuous loop. The last track on Kyokutou I Love You is an instrumental which becomes the bottom musical layer of the first track on Mona Lisa Overdrive. Likewise, the last track on Mona Lisa Overdrive contains samples from the first track on Kyokutou I Love You. The Warp Days tour began in April 2002 and ended with a show at Tokyo Bay NK Hall on June 16, which was recorded for the Tour 2002 Warp Days 20020616 Bay NK Hall concert video. Three shows were also held in June under the title Warp Days -After Dark-, and the band ended the year with a Day in Question on December 29.

The single "Zangai" was released on January 8, 2003, and those who purchased it were able to apply for tickets to a secret live that Buck-Tick held at Shibuya-AX on January 24. The title of February 2003's Mona Lisa Overdrive is mistakenly thought to have been inspired by William Gibson's cyberpunk novel of the same name, but Imai originally confused it with Robert Longo's work Samurai Overdrive, which actually inspired the album's name. The album's tour included 17 shows from March to April, and was followed by the six-date Tour Here We Go Again!. June 28 and 29 saw Buck-Tick hold two outdoor concerts at Hibiya Open-Air Concert Hall titled Mona Lisa Overdrive -Xanadu-. They then played the Summer Sonic Festival on August 2 and 3, and opened for Marilyn Manson again when they played Tokyo Bay NK Hall and Osaka-jō Hall on September 25 and 28 as part of the Grotesk Burlesk Tour. The single "Gensou no Hana", theme song of the TV Asahi show Kiseki no Tobira TV no Chikara, was released on December 3, and the year ended with two Day in Question concerts at the Nippon Budokan.

=== 2004–2011: "Gothic" years, 20th anniversary, and "straight rock" years ===
In 2004, Buck-Tick largely suspended activities in order for the band members to work on individual musical projects. Sakurai began a solo career, releasing the album Ai no Wakusei in June, while Imai also released an album that month with the trio Lucy that he formed with Kiyoshi (Spread Beaver, Machine) and Katsushige Okazaki (Age of Punk). In July, Toll and Higuchi both released albums with their bands, Yagami Toll & The Blue Sky and Wild Wise Apes, respectively. Hoshino was the only member who did not release music during this time, but he went on to form the band Dropz two years later in 2006. Buck-Tick did release their third live album At the Night Side in April, and play four concerts that year; one at Yokohama Arena on September 11, which was a reprise of their Climax Together shows 12 years earlier and was released on home video as Akuma to Freud -Devil and Freud- Climax Together, and three Day in Question shows in December.

The single "Romance" was released on March 2, 2005, and was followed on April 6 with the release of Juusankai wa Gekkou, the band's fourteenth studio album. It is a concept album inspired by Sakurai's solo project that focused on the idea of "Goth", and despite the residual gothic image Buck-Tick had been cultivating for years, it was a significant departure from any of their previous work. Special care was taken with the sets and costumes for the 33-date 13th Floor with Moonshine tour, which began on April 10. The live shows were very dramatic, and the band even hired a clown and a ballerina to perform with them at some of the shows. A Barks journalist called the show a "gothic theatre" and an illusion between dream and reality. At this time, visual kei and Gothic Lolita had been growing significantly in popularity and with Juusankai wa Gekkou, the band gained a large number of new fans domestically and overseas who admired the gothic style. Buck-Tick also began to celebrate their 20th anniversary at the end of the year, with the Film Product concert film shown in theaters in November. December saw the 2005 Tour Diana and a Day in Question concert, as well as the releases of the compilation album Catalogue 2005 and the tribute album Parade: Respective Tracks of Buck-Tick. The last contains covers of their songs performed by 13 different artists, including junior musicians such as Kiyoharu and J, but also senior musicians such as Michiro Endo and Masami Tsuchiya, who had influenced Buck-Tick.

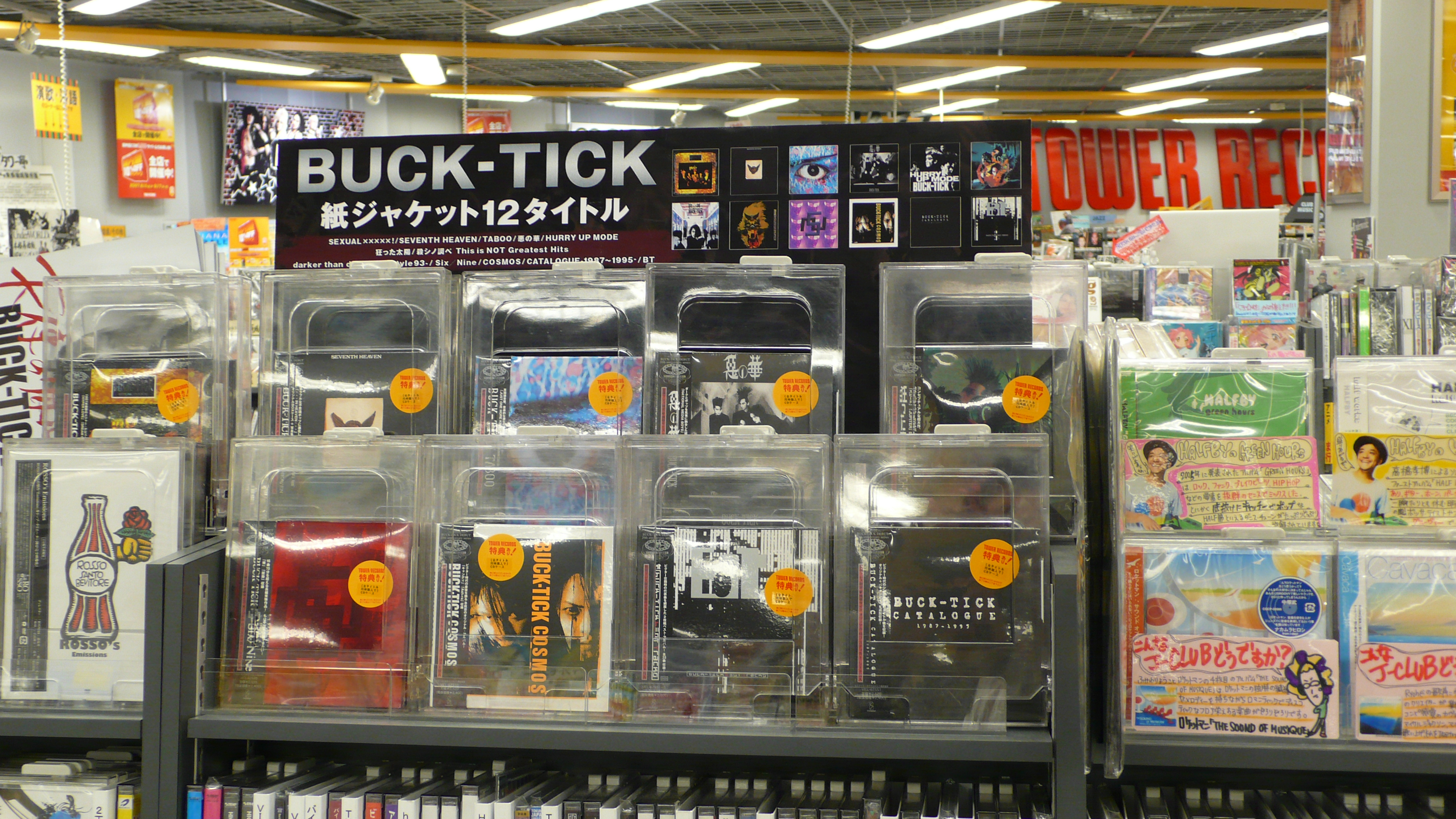
Buck-Tick CDs at a Tower Records store in Tokyo (2007)

2006 had little activity from Buck-Tick. August saw the release of the single "Kagerou", which was written specifically to be used as the ending theme of the xxxHolic anime adaptation, and two performances for the Summer Sonic Festival. Three fan club-only concerts were held in September, followed by three Day in Question concerts in December. For the 20th anniversary of their major label debut, Buck-Tick held the Tour Parade between June and July 2007, where each date featured a different opening act from among the artists that had contributed to the Parade tribute album released in 2005. June 6 saw the release of the single "Rendezvous", and the Tour Parade was scheduled to end in Okinawa on July 15. However, a typhoon prevented a ferry from transporting their gear to the location and the show was rescheduled for January 20, 2008. The single "Alice in Wonder Underground", a gothic rendition of Lewis Carroll Alice in Wonderland, was released on August 8, 2007, and Buck-Tick performed at the Rising Sun Rock Festival on August 17. The Parade tour and the band's anniversary culminated in a large festival called Buck-Tick Fest 2007 On Parade, which was held on September 8 at Minato Mirai in the Yokohama port. It lasted all day and featured all 13 artists from the tribute album. Each of the guest artists and Buck-Tick played a set, and as a grand finale, there was a fireworks show over the bay.

Soon after, on September 19, 2007, Buck-Tick released their fifteenth studio album, Tenshi no Revolver. Though they continued using a few gothic elements, they discarded the use of synth and digital elements for this album, the concept for which was a "straight band sound". The band held a long 34-date national tour to support the album, which lasted until December and included three Day in Question concerts. Coinciding with the stripped back nature on the album's music, the stage setup for the tour was also much simpler than usual. Also in December, the cellphone company SoftBank released special-edition Buck-Tick mobile phones that had been designed by the band members.

After performing the make up show in Okinawa on January 20, the band recuperated from 2007 with little activity in 2008. They released the Buck-Tick Fest 2007 On Parade and Tour 2007 Tenshi no Revolver home videos in April and May, respectively, and covered the song "Hameln" for September's Sirius -Tribute to Ueda Gen-, a tribute album to Lä-ppisch singer Gen Ueda. At the end of the year, BMG Japan was bought out by Sony Music Entertainment Japan and operated independently as BMG until early 2009 where a company reorganization folded it completely into Sony. Thus, the band officially became a Sony Music Entertainment Japan artist, signed to the Ariola Japan subsidiary. Buck-Tick played fan club-only concerts in November and December, before releasing the single "Heaven" on December 12 and performing three Day in Question concerts at the end of the month.

January 2009 saw the release of the single "Galaxy", with the band's sixteenth studio album, Memento Mori, following on February 18. The album continues to explore the sound of "straight rock", and Sakurai said that while the focus of his previous lyrics had been about death, for Memento Mori he focused on both life and death. However, the tour brought back more elaborate stage shows, with Sakurai appearing from a large white balloon. The tour spanned three months beginning in April, with 25 performances in total. The final two concerts were held at Tokyo's NHK Hall in July. Buck-Tick also performed at Arabaki Rock Fest.09 on April 25 and the Inazuma Rock Festival on September 20, and held the Tour Memento Mori -Rebirth- from September to October, before a single Day in Question concert on December 29.

On March 24, 2010, the group released the single "Dokudanjou Beauty". Buck-Tick performed at the Greens 20th Anniversary Live ~Thanks to All!!~ Special event on August 28, before releasing their second single of the year on September 1, "Kuchizuke", which was used as the opening theme for the Shiki anime adaptation. On October 13, the band released its seventeenth studio album titled Razzle Dazzle. For the most part, it continued the straightforward rock sound, but also contained many instances of dance-rock or dance music. The Go On the "Razzle Dazzle" tour began on October 15 and ran until December. December also saw Buck-Tick cover "Omae no Inu ni Naru" for the Romantist - The Stalin, Michiro Endo Tribute Album, and perform at the Rockin' On Presents Countdown Japan 10/11 event. The Utakata no Razzle Dazzle ("うたかたのRAZZLE DAZZLE") tour began on January 23, and the band performed at the Music and People Vol. 8 event on February 20. However, due to the Great East Japan Earthquake on March 11, the remaining tour dates were postponed until November and December. Buck-Tick ended the year with four Day in Question concerts that served as a prelude to their 25th anniversary.

=== 2012–2019: 25th anniversary and Lingua Sounda ===
To celebrate their 25th anniversary, Buck-Tick opened a special website where they announced the creation of their own record label Lingua Sounda, and that its first releases would be a single in spring 2012 and an album in the summer. The Lingua Sounda logo was designed by manga artist Tsutomu Nihei. The band released two separate box sets in March, one containing work from 1987 to 1999 and the other from 2000 to 2010, titled Catalogue Victor→Mercury 87–99 and Catalogue Ariola 00–10 respectively. The single "Elise no Tame ni" was released on May 23, the same day as the home video of their 2011 Day in Question concert. In June, Buck-Tick held two concerts titled At the Night Side 2012 at Hibiya Open-Air Concert Hall in June, with the first being for fan club members only, and then began the Tour Parade 2012, which lasted into July. For the latter, they were joined by artists who contributed to the second tribute album to them, Parade II: Respective Tracks of Buck-Tick, which was released on July 4 and features 13 artists, including D'erlanger, Polysics and Pay Money to My Pain. Their next single, "Miss Take ~Boku wa Miss Take~", was also released on July 4. Fans who ordered both it and the previous single had a chance to win tickets to the band's promotional video shoot for the song "Climax Together". The band released their eighteenth studio album, Yume Miru Uchuu, on September 19, before holding Buck-Tick Fest 2012 On Parade on September 22 and 23. The fest attracted an estimated 14,000 fans and included bands who appear on the tribute album such as Mucc, Merry, Cali Gari, and others. The Yume Miru Uchuu tour lasted for 27 concerts from October 6 to December 29.

2013 began with the 27-date Tour 2013 Cosmic Dreamer, which ran from January 20 to March 7 and featured a large set that provided fake rain for Sakurai to sing in despite all venues being indoor live houses. Buck-Tick held their first charity concert, Tour 2013 Cosmic Dreamer Extra ~ We Love All!, on March 11 at Nippon Seinenkan to support reconstruction after the Great East Japan Earthquake. The film Buck-Tick the Movie ~Buck-Tick Phenomenon~ (劇場版BUCK-TICK ～バクチク現象～, Gekijō-ban Bakuchiku ~Bakuchiku Genshō~) was shown in theaters in two parts in 2013; part one opening on June 15 and part two on June 22, each for one week only. Created from over 2,500 hours of footage that documented the band conducting their 25th anniversary activities, an advanced screening was previously held in Buck-Tick's home prefecture of Gunma on June 1. The band wrote two new songs exclusively for the film, "Love Parade" composed by Hoshino and "Steppers -Parade-" by Imai. In September, they performed at Kishidan Banpaku 2013 ~Bōsō Bakuon Ryōzanpaku~ on the 14 and at Nakatsugawa The Solar Budokan 2013 event on the 22, which were hosted by Kishidan and Taiji Sato of Theatre Brook respectively. Buck-Tick then finished the year off with four The Day in Question concerts.

"Love Parade" and "Steppers -Parade-" were released as a non-album double A-side single on January 22, 2014. Buck-Tick's thirty-fourth single "Keijijou Ryuusei" was released on May 14, and was followed by their nineteenth studio album, Arui wa Anarchy, on June 4. The album's 28-date tour ran from June 18 to September 26, before the band began Tour 2014 Metaform Nights ~Arui wa Anarchy~ on October 25 and held the Arui wa Anarchy -NPPNBDKN- concert at the Nippon Budokan on December 29. Buck-Tick took a brief hiatus in 2015, as Imai restarted his side-project Schaft and Sakurai formed a solo project called The Mortal. The band did however perform at the Lunatic Fest hosted by Luna Sea on June 28, where they were joined onstage by J for "Iconoclasm", and five The Day in Question concerts in December. At the fifth and final one on December 29, Buck-Tick announced their return to Victor Entertainment with Lingua Sounda becoming its sub label. 2016 was inactive for the band until September, when they played the Climax Together 3rd concert at Yokohama Arena to 13,000 people on September 11, 12 years after their second Climax Together show and 24 years after the first, released the single "New World" on September 21, and released their twentieth studio album Atom Miraiha No.9 on September 28. The album peaked at number nine on the Oricon Albums Chart and was supported by a 28-date tour that lasted from October 8 to December 29.

Buck-Tick won the special "Inspiration Award Japan" at the 2017 MTV Video Music Awards Japan. Their single "Babel" was released on November 15, 2017. Following the February 21, 2018, release of their single "Moon Sayonara wo Oshiete", Buck-Tick's twenty-first studio album No.0 was released on March 14. It became their first album in almost 25 years to reach the top three positions on the Oricon Albums Chart. They performed on the first night of the hide 20th Memorial Super Live Spirits event at Tokyo Otaiba Yagai Tokusetsu Stage J Chikuon on April 28, in memory of X Japan guitarist hide. On December 9, 2018, Sakurai was visibly unwell during Buck Tick's concert at Zepp Divercity, but insisted on finishing the performance. After the concert, he was diagnosed with gastrointestinal bleeding and subsequent shows had to be postponed for his treatment. On May 22, 2019, the top five charting double A-side single "Kemonotachi no Yoru/Rondo" was released.

=== 2020–present: 35th anniversary and Sakurai's death ===
On January 29, 2020, Buck-Tick released the single "Datenshi" and their third tribute album Parade III -Respective Tracks of Buck-Tick-. A fan club tour was announced, but postponed due to the COVID-19 pandemic in Japan. Another single, "Moonlight Escape", was released on August 26. Abracadabra, their twenty-second studio album, was released on September 21, and reached number three on the Oricon chart. The members of the band appear in and provided the theme song to Peach Booty G, an anime shown at a virtual reality/augmented reality event in Nagoya TV Tower beginning on November 6. In September 2021, they released their forty-first single titled "Go-Go BT Train", which reached number five. A lengthy nation-wide tour was scheduled to begin at the end of October despite the continued COVID-19 pandemic. However, it was ultimately cancelled after doctors recommended Imai undergo further rehabilitation for a left femur fracture he sustained in August.

In June 2022, the band announced its plans for the 35th anniversary of their debut. On September 21, they released a special concept 5-disc compilation album titled Catalogue The Best 35th Anniv. (with 80 songs on discs named in Esperanto as Ribelo, Gotika, Elektrizo, Fantazio, Espero), which reached number eight on the Oricon chart. It includes the new song "Sayonara Shelter", inspired by a Ukrainian girl singing "Let It Go" during the Russian invasion of Ukraine. They also played several large-scale concerts at Yokohama Arena during a nationwide tour to celebrate the anniversary which ended in December at the Nippon Budokan.

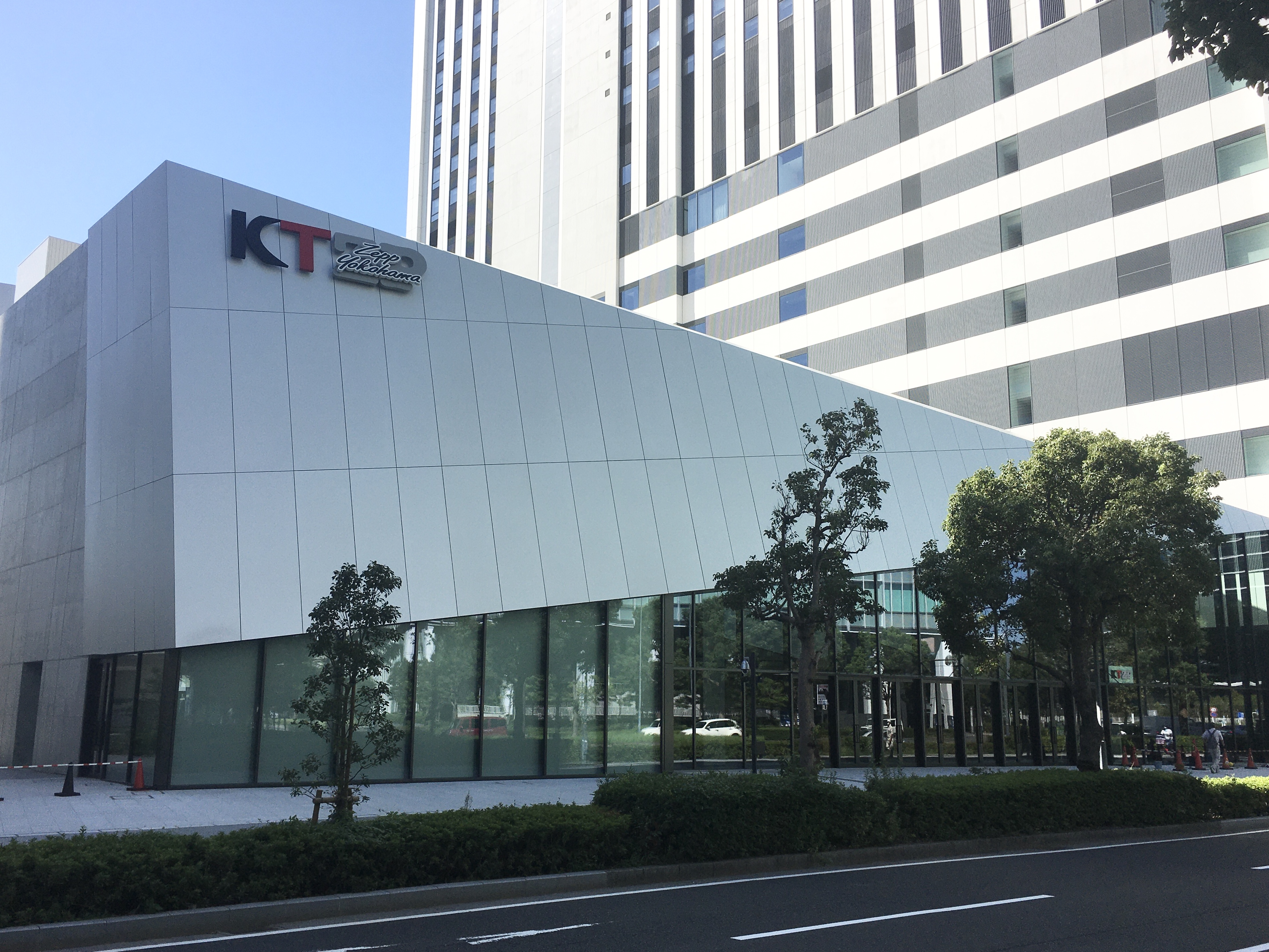
Lead vocalist Atsushi Sakurai died on October 19, 2023, after cutting short a concert at KT Zepp Yokohama.

In March 2023, they released the top 10-charting singles "Taiyou to Ikaros" and "Mugen Loop", followed on April 12 with the release of their twenty-third studio album Izora. It reached the 2nd position on the Oricon chart and was their first top three album on Billboard Japan's Hot Albums charts. It was supported by a nationwide tour with over 20 concerts in 18 locations, ending on September 17 and 18 at Gunma Music Center in the band's hometown. That same month, several movie theaters screened The Parade –35th Anniversary– Fly Side & High Side live video recording nationwide. A live house tour was scheduled to take place between October and December.

On October 19, 2023, during a concert at KT Zepp Yokohama that was exclusively for members of Buck-Tick's fan club, Sakurai was rushed to a hospital due to sudden signs of illness, abruptly ending the performance after only three songs. He died from a brainstem hemorrhage at the hospital later that night, at the age of 57. His death was announced by the band on October 24. Buck-Tick also announced the cancellation of all previously scheduled performances. They held a two-day memorial event for Sakurai, titled The Ceremony -Atsushi Sakurai e- (THE CEREMONY -櫻井敦司へ-), at Zepp Haneda on December 8 and 9. The band then held the Buck-Tick Phenomenon -2023- performance at the Nippon Budokan on December 29. They were previously scheduled to hold The Day in Question 2023 concert at the venue that day, before cancelling it following Sakurai's death. However, after discussions between the band members and their staff, Buck-Tick decided to rebook the performance under the new title. The concert was performed using live recordings of Sakurai's vocals and the surviving members announced that they will continue together as Buck-Tick. They also revealed that they would start recording a new album in 2024 and announced a concert to be held at the same venue in exactly one year.

Buck-Tick' first release of new material following Sakurai's death was the single "Raijin Fūjin - Resonance" on November 20, 2024. It features Imai and Hoshino sharing vocal duties. Although Imai had sung lead vocal parts in the band previously, the song marked Hoshino's first time singing lead. At the same time, the hyphen in the band's name was changed to an infinity symbol (∞). Subrosa, the band's twenty-fourth studio album, was released on December 4, before their Nippon Budokan concert on December 29. The album's tour ran from April 12, 2025, to May 25.

== Music style ==
"Aku no Hana"
A 25-second sample of "Aku no Hana", from the album of the same name (1990) and the band's only number one single.

"Romance"
A 27-second sample of "Romance", from Juusankai wa Gekkou (2005), showing the band's gothic rock sound.

Buck-Tick's music has changed and evolved hugely over the course of their career. Their early work was influenced by the Japanese "positive punk" scene. Similar to their contemporaries and fellow Gunma Prefecture natives Boøwy, it used simple rhythms and chords, with the songs mostly in major keys and using some English words in the lyrics. Starting with 1989's Taboo, they experimented with a darker-gothic sound, which grew more mature with Kurutta Taiyou in 1991. Darker Than Darkness: Style 93 delved into a harsher industrial rock sound which continued all the way up through Mona Lisa Overdrive in 2003. With 2005's Juusankai wa Gekkou, they completely adopted a "goth" concept, which they combined with a retro straight rock sound for the albums Tenshi no Revolver (2007) and Memento Mori (2009). Their next album, 2010's Razzle Dazzle, then incorporated many instances of dance-rock. Jrock Revolution described the band's style as having gone "from the bubbly sounds of pop to the buzz of electronic cyberpunk to lustful velvety goth to the smooth style of hard rock and back again". Due to their experimentation with various genres, the band is considered a rare example of a music act who "manage to keep things interesting despite—or because of—their longevity", "among the most prolific and popular groups in the country's music history... remain one of the more adventurous projects going in Japanese music". Some elements that persist throughout their music are resounding, jangling guitar chords, twin guitar interplay, throbbing, prominent bass lines, harsh roars of electronically distorted noise, and ambivalent melodies that wander between major and minor keys.

Buck-Tick's music is smashed-together nuances of everything from Depeche Mode and New Order to U2 and the Knack. While wry, it can float and be nebulously melodic. [...] Masked in eye makeup, Atsushi looks and sounds possessed. Buck-Tick was (and continues to be) and anomaly in the Japanese music scene, a tangle of goth rock diluted with synth and electronica. It's unhappy, dirty music, the musical equivalent of exploded soot and smoke.

— Josephine Yun, A Concise Report on 40 of the Biggest Rock Acts in Japan

Their visual look and image has been called "dark enough to attract fringe subcultures, but not too dark to scare off mainstreamers". Early in their career, they were visually well-known for "gravity-defying" hairstyles (only drummer Yagami has continued this in the subsequent decades). Their visually attractive bishounen–androgynous appearance related to visual kei was best embodied in the presence and charisma of the band's "handsome" frontman Sakurai. With his distinctive rich baritone voice, music critics from Metropolis included Sakurai in their Pantheon of 13 Japanese Rock Gods in 2011.

Imai and Hoshino are the main composers of music in the band. Sakurai is the main lyricist, and is famous for the erotic decadence of his lyrics which are predominantly in Japanese since 1990's Aku no Hana, influenced by Baudelaire's Les Fleurs du Mal (as are the band's visual look and concept), but he also often addressed existential psychological themes, with the lyrics described as a "dance in a daydream about reality". The song "Rakuen (Inori Koinegai)" caused controversy because some of the lyrics were lifted from the Quran before the album was re-issued with the offending part removed by November 1995.

Japanese music critics hailed their live musical and vocal performances even during their 30th and 35th anniversaries, writing that there are no other rock bands playing with such style and musicianship, as they are not only ahead of their time but "in a different dimension".

=== Influences ===
Buck-Tick has been most strongly influenced by Western rock, especially British post-punk and new romantic from the 1970s and 1980s, though they cite a few Japanese influences as well. The influences that the band members collectively name the most often are Love & Rockets, Robert Smith, and Bauhaus (the band admitted to going together to see Peter Murphy live). They also mention David Bowie, Sex Pistols and Culture Club. Imai was especially influenced by Love & Rockets, and this is very evident on Buck-Tick's album Kurutta Taiyou. He was also influenced by Yellow Magic Orchestra, Kraftwerk, Ultravox and other new wave and electronica acts, and the punk band The Stalin. Sakurai played a cover of Bowie's song "Space Oddity" at his solo live in 2004. He is also influenced by post-punk/first wave goth acts such as The Sisters of Mercy, Siouxsie and the Banshees, Clan of Xymox, Der Zibet and Masami Tsuchiya. He claims to love "dark" music in general. Hoshino and Yagami both love The Beatles. Yagami is also a fan of Led Zeppelin and other classic metal/punk acts like Kiss and The Clash.

== Legacy ==
Buck-Tick are regarded as one of the main founders of visual kei, and legends of the Japanese rock scene, and have been cited as an influenced by many artists. J said that they have been a big influence ever since he formed Luna Sea. Kyo and Tetsu of D'erlanger both listed Buck-Tick as one of their favorite bands, and Tetsu also named Toll as one of the greatest Japanese drummers. Zi:Kill guitarist Ken named Imai as one of his favorite musicians. Takanori Nishikawa is another open fan of Buck-Tick, and interviewed the entire band on the TV program Pop Jam. Dir En Grey vocalist Kyo was inspired to become a rock star after seeing a picture of Sakurai on the desk of a junior high school classmate. Likewise, his bandmate Die became interested in rock music in junior high after hearing Aku no Hana. Mucc frontman Tatsuro cited Sakurai as the vocalist who has influenced him the most, including his lyrics and stage presence. D vocalist Asagi listed Buck-Tick as one of their biggest influences, while his bandmate Tsunehito named them as one of his two favorite Japanese bands. Kishidan frontman Show Ayanocozey and Nagoya kei band Deadman have also cited Buck-Tick as an inspiration. Well-known visual kei rock musicians Tatsuro (Mucc), Yuu (Merry), Aie (Deadman), Lay (Fatima) and Tsuyoshi (Karimero) formed a Buck-Tick cover band called Bluck-Tlick in 2001.

Darker Than Darkness: Style 93 was named one of the top albums from 1989−1998 in a 2004 issue of the music magazine Band Yarouze. Kurutta Taiyou was named number 40 on Bounce's 2009 list of 54 Standard Japanese Rock Albums. Aku no Hana was included in the 2023 guidebook 90-Nendai J-Pop no Kihon, which lists the 100 albums most representative of the Japanese music scene of the 1990s.

== Band members ==
Current members

- Hisashi Imai (今井 寿, Imai Hisashi) – lead guitar, theremin, backing vocals (1983–present), lead vocals (1993–present)
- Hidehiko "Hide" Hoshino (星野 英彦, Hoshino Hidehiko) – rhythm guitar, keyboards, backing vocals (1983–present), lead vocals (2023–present)
- Yutaka "U-ta" Higuchi (桶口 豊, Higuchi Yutaka) – bass guitar (1983–present)
- Toll Yagami (ヤガミ トール, Yagami Tōru) – drums, percussion (1985–present)

Former members

- Atsushi Sakurai (櫻井 敦司, Sakurai Atsushi) – lead vocals, percussion (1985–2023; his death), drums (1983–1985) saxophone (1994–2023)
- Araki (アラキ) – lead vocals (1983–1985)

Timeline

== Discography ==
- Hurry Up Mode (1987)
- Sexual XXXXX! (1987)
- Seventh Heaven (1988)
- Taboo (1989)
- Aku no Hana (1990)
- Kurutta Taiyou (1991)
- Darker Than Darkness: Style 93 (1993)
- Six/Nine (1995)
- Cosmos (1996)
- Sexy Stream Liner (1997)
- One Life, One Death (2000)
- Kyokutou I Love You (2002)
- Mona Lisa Overdrive (2003)
- Juusankai wa Gekkou (2005)
- Tenshi no Revolver (2007)
- Memento Mori (2009)
- Razzle Dazzle (2010)
- Yume Miru Uchuu (2012)
- Arui wa Anarchy (2014)
- Atom Miraiha No.9 (2016)
- No.0 (2018)
- Abracadabra (2020)
- Izora (2023)
- Subrosa (2024)
