= Parade: Respective Tracks of Buck-Tick =

Compilation album by various artists
- Released: December 21, 2005
- Genre: Rock
- Length: 66:33
- Label: BMG/Funhouse
- Producer: Hidehiko Tashiro

Buck-Tick tribute albums chronology
Parade: Respective Tracks of Buck-Tick (2005)	Parade II: Respective Tracks of Buck-Tick (2012)

Parade: Respective Tracks of Buck-Tick is the first tribute album to Japanese rock band Buck-Tick, released on December 21, 2005. It collects cover versions of their songs by various artists. It reflected the influence Buck-Tick had on younger generation musicians in Japan, and later in 2007, some of these artists performed at a festival dedicated to the band, which was released on DVD. The album reached number 14 on the Oricon chart.

A second tribute album titled Parade II: Respective Tracks of Buck-Tick was released on July 7, 2012.

== Track listing ==
No.	Title	Length
1.	"Just One More Kiss" (Kiyoharu)
2.	"Iconoclasm" (J)
3.	"Moon Light" (Balzac)
4.	"Mienai Mono o Miyo to Suru Gokai Subete Gokai da" (Masami Tsuchiya)
5.	"My Fuckin' Valentine" (Attack Haus)
6.	"Living on the Net (Ken Ishii Remix)" (Ken Ishii)
7.	"Sasayaki" (Michiro Endo)
8.	"Rokugatsu no Okinawa" (Theatre Brook)
9.	"Speed" (MCU of Kick the Can Crew)
10.	"Monster" (Runaway Boys; Kyo of D'erlanger and Nackie of Coaltar of the Deepers)
11.	"Physical Neurose" (Age of Punk)
12.	"Aku no Hana" (Rally; Teru and Hisashi of Glay, Motokatsu Miyagami of The Mad Capsule Markets and Kouji Ueno of Thee Michelle Gun Elephant)
13.	"Dress" (Abingdon Boys School)
