= Galaxy (Buck-Tick song) =

- Regular edition cover

Single by Buck-Tick

from the album Memento Mori
- Released: January 14, 2009
- Genre: Rock
- Length: 9:32
- Label: BMG JAPAN
- Songwriters: Atsushi Sakurai, Hisashi Imai
- Producer: Buck-Tick

Buck-Tick singles chronology
"Heaven" (2008)	"Galaxy" (2009)	"Dokudanjou Beauty" (2010)

Galaxy is the twenty-eighth single released by the Japanese rock band Buck-Tick, released on January 14, 2009.

The single reached number 6 at Oricon Singles Chart, and stayed on the chart for five weeks.

== Track listing ==
No.	Title	Lyrics	Music	Length
1.	"GALAXY"	Atsushi Sakurai	Hisashi Imai	4:19
2.	"Umbrella - I Love Serenade"	Hisashi Imai	Hisashi Imai	5:13
Total length:				9:32

== Musicians ==
- Atsushi Sakurai - voice
- Hisashi Imai - guitar
- Hidehiko Hoshino - guitar
- Yutaka Higuchi - bass
- Toll Yagami - drums
- Kazutoshi Yokoyama - keyboard
