= Hurry Up Mode (1990 Mix) =

Remix album by Buck-Tick
- Released: February 8, 1990; February 19, 2002 (digital remaster); September 5, 2007 (remaster)
- Recorded: Yamaha Hiyoshi Center Studio (1987), Sound Sky (remixed 1989)
- Genre: Punk rock
- Label: Victor

Buck-Tick chronology
Aku no Hana (1990)	Hurry Up Mode (1990)	Symphonic Buck-Tick in Berlin (1990)

Professional ratings
Review scores
Source	Rating
AllMusic	3.5/5 stars

Hurry Up Mode, commonly referred to as Hurry Up Mode (1990 Mix), is a remix album by Buck-Tick, released on February 8, 1990. It is composed of different versions of every song on their 1987 debut album Hurry Up Mode, except the two CD-exclusive bonus tracks. Although the packaging features no such designation, the band's official website refers to this album as "Hurry Up Mode (1990 Mix)". It topped the Oricon Albums Chart, selling 212,430 copies. The album was digitally remastered and re-released on February 19, 2002, with two different bonus tracks. It was remastered and re-released again on September 5, 2007. "Moon Light" was later re-recorded once again for their 1992 compilation album Koroshi no Shirabe This Is Not Greatest Hits.

== Track listing ==
All songs written & composed by Hisashi Imai, except track 2 music & track 9 lyrics by Atsushi Sakurai.

1. "Prologue"
2. "Plastic Syndrome Type II"
3. ""Hurry Up Mode"
4. "Telephone Murder"
5. "Fly High"
6. "One Night Ballet"
7. "Moon Light"
8. "For Dangerous Kids"
9. "Romanesque"
10. "Secret Reaction"
11. "Stay Gold"

=== 2002 Digital Remaster Bonus Tracks ===
1. "Moon Light" (Unreleased Version)
2. "Theme of BT" (by Naka Nozomu)

== See also ==
- 1990 in Japanese music
