= Symphonic Buck-Tick in Berlin =

Remix album by Buck-Tick
- Released: July 21, 1990
- Recorded: April 1990
- Studio: Hansa Tons (Berlin)
- Genre: Classical music
- Languages: Japanese, English
- Label: Victor
- Producers: Kenny Inaoka and Hidekazu Tokumitsu

Buck-Tick chronology
Hurry Up Mode (1990 Mix) (1990)	Symphonic Buck-Tick in Berlin (1990)	Kurutta Taiyou (1991)

Symphonic Buck-Tick in Berlin is an orchestral arrangement album by the Japanese rock band Buck-Tick. It was released on July 21, 1990, through Victor Entertainment. It is composed of rearrangements of Buck-Tick songs by several different composers, all performed by the Berlin Chamber Orchestra.

== Track listing ==
1. "Maboroshi no Miyako" (幻の都; Illusion City)
2. "Just One More Kiss"
3. "Silent Night"
4. "Hyper Love"
5. "Aku no Hana" (悪の華; Evil Flower)
6. "...In Heaven..."
7. "Illusion"
8. "Love Me"
9. "Kiss Me Goodbye"

== See also ==
- 1990 in Japanese music
