= Catalogue 2005 =

Compilation album by Buck-Tick
- Released: December 7, 2005
- Genre: Alternative rock; punk rock; post-punk; gothic rock; industrial rock; power pop
- Label: BMG/Funhouse

Buck-Tick chronology
13kai wa Gekkou (2005)	Catalogue 2005 (2005)	Tenshi no Revolver (2007)

Catalogue 2005 is the sixth compilation album by Buck-Tick, released on December 7, 2005. It is an updated, expanded edition of Catalogue 1987–1995 that was released in 1995. However, it does not contain "M・A・D", "Die" or "Mienai Mono o Miyou to Suru Gokai Subete Gokai da". It reached number fourteen on the Oricon chart.

== Track listing ==
=== Disc One ===
1. "Hurry Up Mode"
2. "Sexual XXXXX!"
3. "Physical Neurose"
4. "Just One More Kiss"
5. "Speed" (スピード)
6. "Sakura" (さくら; Cherry Blossom)
7. "Jupiter"
8. "Angelic Conversation"
9. "Iconoclasm"
10. "Aku no Hana" (悪の華; Evil Flower)
11. "Dress" (ドレス)
12. "Kodou" (鼓動; Heartbeat)
13. "Uta" (唄; Song)
14. "Candy" (キャンディ)
15. "Cosmos"
16. "My Fuckin' Valentine"
17. "Miu" (ミウ)

=== Disc Two ===
1. "Glamorous"
2. "Baby, I Want You."
3. "Rhapsody"
4. "Flame"
5. "Shippu no Blade Runner" (疾風のブレードランナー; Hurricane’s Blade Runner)
6. "21st Cherry Boy"
7. "Kyokuto Yori Ai wo Komete" (極東より愛を込めて; From the Far East with Love)
8. "Long Distance Call"
9. "Zangai" (残骸; Wreck)
10. "Girl"
11. "Mona Lisa"
12. "Gensou no Hana" (幻想の花; Flowers of Illusion)
13. "Nocturne -Rain Song-"
14. "Muma -The Nightmare-" (夢魔 -The Nightmare-; Succubus -The Nightmare)
15. "Romance"
16. "Diabolo"
