= Masami Tsuchiya =

Masami Tsuchiya may refer to:

- Masami Tsuchiya (Aum Shinrikyo) (1965–2018), member of the Aum Shinrikyo movement
- Masami Tsuchiya (singer) (born 1952), singer and guitarist
