= Sweet Strange Live Disc =

Live album by Buck-Tick
- Released: August 12, 1998
- Recorded: Nippon Budokan (May 8 & 9, 1998)
- Genre: Alternative rock; industrial rock
- Label: Mercury
- Producer: Buck-Tick

Buck-Tick chronology
LTD (1998)	Sweet Strange Live Disc (1998)	BT (1999)

Sweet Strange Live Disc is the first live album by Buck-Tick, released on August 12, 1998. The songs were all recorded at the Nippon Budokan on either 8 or 9 May 1998. It reached number seventeen on the Oricon chart.

== Track listing ==
1. "Sexy Stream Liner"
2. "Heroin" (ヒロイン)
3. "Chocho" (蝶蝶; Butterfly)
4. "Kalavinka" (迦陵頻伽 Kalavinka)
5. "Sasayaki" (囁き; Whisper)
6. "Rasenchu" (螺旋 虫; Spiral Worm)
7. "Tight Rope"
8. "Chaos - Kirameki no Naka de" (Chaos～キラメキの中で; Chaos - In the Glitter)
9. "My Fuckin' Valentine"
10. "Lizard Skin no Shojo" (リザードスキンの少女; Lizard-Skinned Girl)
11. "Muchi no Namida" (無知の涙; Tear for Ignorance)
12. "Mienai Mono o Miyo to Suru Gokai Subete Gokai da" (見えない物を見ようとする誤解 全て誤解だ; While Misunderstanding and Trying to See the Invisible, Everything is Misunderstood)
13. "Kimi Ga Shin.. Dara" (キミガシン..ダラ; When... You Die)
14. "Schiz・o Gensou" (Schiz・o 幻想; Schiz・o Illusions)
15. "Thanatos" (タナトス)
16. "Candy" (キャンディ)
