= Speed (Buck-Tick song) =

Single by Buck-Tick

from the album Kurutta Taiyou
- Released: January 21, 1991
- Recorded: October 18, 1990 at Victor Studio in Tokyo
- Genre: Alternative rock
- Length: 4:47
- Label: Victor Entertainment
- Songwriter(s): Atsushi Sakurai / Hisashi Imai
- Producer(s): Buck-Tick

Buck-Tick singles chronology
"Aku no Hana" (1990)	"Speed" (1991)	"M・A・D" (1991)

"Speed" (スピード) is the fourth single released by the Japanese rock band Buck-Tick. It was released as the first single from the group's sixth studio album, Kurutta Taiyou, on January 21, 1991, through Victor Entertainment. The single was released as an 8 cm CD in a cassette-like sleeve case that featured a re-worked version of the cover to Kurutta Taiyou. "Speed" peaked at number 3 on the Oricon music chart during the third week of 1991. It is band's 3rd best-selling single, with over 180,000 copies sold.

== Background, recording and release ==
The song was written by vocalist Atsushi Sakurai and lead guitarist Hisashi Imai in 1990 shortly after the release of Buck-Tick's fifth studio album Aku no Hana for their then-upcoming sixth studio album Kurutta Taiyou. Initially, the song was titled "Acid"; however, the title was changed to "Speed" as the band deemed that titling "Acid" was "too risky", as Imai had been arrested for LSD possession after a concert during the group's tour for their fourth studio album Taboo in May 1989. "Speed", along with the single's b-side "Narcissus", was recorded on October 18, 1990, at Victor Studio in Tokyo during the recording sessions for Kurutta Taiyou. The song was released as the first single from the album on January 21, 1991, followed by its release as the first track on Kurutta Taiyou on February 20, 1991. In the liner notes to Kurutta Taiyou, the line "ii ashido" (good acid) was censored by the group's record label, Victor Entertainment. Sakurai has made references to this by whispering words for various drugs or not singing the line during live performances.

== Live performances ==
Since its release, "Speed" has become a fan favorite and a live concert staple, being performed at most of the group's concerts since 1990. Though it has been performed less in recent years since 2010. During most live performances of the song, Sakurai will change the line "ii ashido" (good acid) and whisper the word "jouzai" (pill) as a reference to the line being censored in the album's original liner notes. Though during a live performance on the TV show Music Station in 1991, Sakurai held the microphone down to the audience during this part and mouthed "kokain" (cocaine) to the camera.

== Cover versions ==
"Speed" has been covered by a number of other Japanese artists. It was covered by MCU from the pop/hip hop group Kick the Can Crew for the Buck-Tick tribute album Parade -Respective Tracks of Buck-Tick- in 2005, as well as the visual kei rock band 9Goats Black Out on the compilation album Crush!: 90s V-Rock Best Hit Cover Songs in 2011.

== Track listing ==
Side A
No.	Title	Lyrics	Music	Length
1.	"Speed"	Atsushi Sakurai	Hisashi Imai	4:47

Side B
No.	Title	Lyrics	Music	Length
1.	"Narcissus"	Sakurai	Hidehiko Hoshino	4:09

== Personnel ==
- Atsushi Sakurai - lead vocals
- Hisashi Imai - lead guitar
- Hidehiko Hoshino - rhythm guitar
- Yutaka Higuchi - bass
- Toll Yagami - drums
