= Gensou no Hana =

"Genso no Hana"
- Regular edition cover

Single by Buck-Tick
- Released: December 3, 2003
- Genre: Rock
- Length: 9:50
- Label: BMG Japan/Ariola Japan
- Songwriter(s): Hisashi Imai; Atsushi Sakurai; Hidehiko Hoshino

Buck-Tick singles chronology
"'Zangai'" (2003)	"Genso no Hana" (2003)	"'Romance'" (2005)

"Genso no Hana" (幻想の花, Gensō no Hana; lit. "Fantasy Flowers") is the twenty-second single by the Japanese rock band Buck-Tick, released on December 3, 2003. The song was used for TV Asahi's show Kiseki no Tobira TV no Chikara. It reached number 11 at Oricon Singles Chart, staying on chart for six weeks.

== Track listing ==
No.	Title	Length	Lyrics	Music
1	"Genso no Hana"	4:33	Atsushi Sakurai	Hidehiko Hoshino
2	"Nocturne: Rain Song"	3:51	Hisashi Imai	Hisashi Imai
3	"Genso no Hana: live version"	4:58		

== Musicians ==
- Atsushi Sakurai - vocals
- Hisashi Imai - guitar
- Hidehiko Hoshino - guitar
- Yutaka Higuchi - bass
- Toll Yagami - drums
