= Romance (Buck-Tick song) =

- Regular edition cover

Single by Buck-Tick

from the album Juusankai wa Gekkou
- Released: March 2, 2005
- Genre: Gothic rock
- Length: 8:28
- Label: BMG Japan/Ariola
- Songwriters: Hisashi Imai; Atsushi Sakurai

Buck-Tick singles chronology
"Genso no Hana" (2003)	"Romance" (2005)	"Dress (Bloody Trinity Mix)" (2006)

"Romance" is the twenty-third single by the Japanese rock band Buck-Tick, released on March 2, 2005.

It peaked at number 14 on Oricon Singles Chart, staying on chart for seven weeks.

== Track listing ==
Side	Title	Length	Lyrics	Music
A	"Romance"	4:33	Atsushi Sakurai	Hisashi Imai
B	"Diabolo"	3:51	Atsushi Sakurai	Hisashi Imai

=== Limited DVD Edition ===
1. "LOVE ME (※ 2004 Sun Dec 29 Budokan live)" (3:51)
