= Parade II: Respective Tracks of Buck-Tick =

Parade: Respective Tracks of Buck-Tick

Compilation album by various artists
- Released: July 4, 2012
- Genre: Rock
- Length: 53:20
- Label: Lingua Sounda
- Producer: Masahiro Shinoki

Buck-Tick tribute albums chronology
Parade: Respective Tracks of Buck-Tick (2005)	Parade: Respective Tracks of Buck-Tick (2012)

Parade II: Respective Tracks of Buck-Tick is the second tribute album to Japanese rock band Buck-Tick, released on July 4, 2012. The album reached number 14 on Billboard Japan Top Albums and number 16 on the Oricon chart.

Produced in celebration of the band's 25 anniversary, it collects cover versions of their songs by various artists. The cover art was created by Hiroshi Ueda, illustrator of the manga Full Metal Panic! Σ and Tiger & Bunny: The Comic.

The first tribute album, Parade: Respective Tracks of Buck-Tick, was released on December 21, 2005. Like the first album, the second was also supported with a festival that included the artists featured on the album; held on September 22–23, 2012. A home video of the two-day event was released on February 20, 2013.

== Track listing ==
No.	Title	Length
1.	"Romanesque" (Acid Black Cherry)
2.	"Just One More Kiss" (Breakerz)
3.	"Misty Zone" (Cali Gari)
4.	"Sid Vicious on the Beach" (Polysics)
5.	"Machine" (Kishidan)
6.	"Aku no Hana" (Merry)
7.	"Jupiter" (Mucc)
8.	"Love Letter" (Pay Money to My Pain)
9.	"Iconoclasm" (D'erlanger)
10.	"Empty Girl" (N'Shukugawa Boys)
11.	"Elise no Tame ni (The Lowbrows Remix)" (The Lowbrows)
12.	"Sexual XXXXX!" (Acid Android)
13.	"M・A・D" (AA=)
