= Der Zibet =

Japanese visual kei rock band

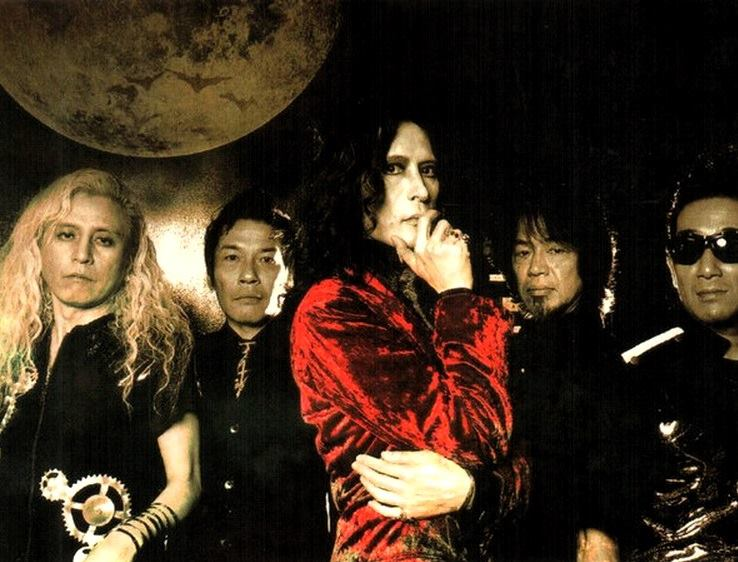
- Der Zibet circa 2014. From left to right: Hikaru, Mayumi, Issay, Mahito, Hal.

Background information
- Origin: Japan
- Genres: Rock, Alternative rock, Hard rock, Glam rock, Gothic rock, Art rock
- Years active: 1984–1996; 2007–2023
- Labels: Sixty, Columbia/Triad, BMG/Ariola, Pop Mania, Danger Crue
- Past members: Issay; Hikaru; Hal; Mayumi; Mahito
- Website: derzibet.com

Der Zibet (stylized as DER ZIBET) was a Japanese rock band formed in 1984. The group was made up of vocalist Issay, guitarist Hikaru, bassist Hal, and drummer Mayumi upon formation. Together, they released ten singles and twelve studio albums before announcing that they were going on an indefinite hiatus in 1996.

Der Zibet reunited in 2007 and released the single reD biteZ with keyboardist Mahito officially joining the lineup. They went on to release six more studio albums before disbanding in 2023 following the death of vocalist Issay.

== History ==
Der Zibet was formed in 1984 by vocalist Issay and bassist Hal, who were previously in a band called ISSAY and SUICIDES. They were joined by guitarist Hikaru, drummer Mayumi and Mahito on keyboards. Only a year later, Mahito left the group just before they signed to a major record label (though he would continue to perform with them as a support member) and they released their debut album Violetter Ball.

Their fourth album Garden was recorded in London in 1988, the process was videotaped and released on VHS. Der Zibet continued to put out many releases and collaborate with other artists, but after their 1996 live compilation album Ari the band went on hiatus.

In 2007 Der Zibet resumed activities, with Mahito a full member again. They released their thirteenth studio album Primitive on March 6, 2009. On November 10, 2010, they released the album Kaikoteki Mirai ~ Nostalgic Future, which is composed of new songs as well as self cover, live and remix versions of songs from throughout their 25-year career. They held the two-man Rock'n Roll Vaudeville 2011 show together with Ra:IN on June 24, 2011.

In April 2012 Der Zibet released two more studio albums, Romanoid 1 and Romanoid 2. In September, they performed alongside Ra:IN, Ladies Room and Tokyo Yankees at the Yokohama Summer Rock Fes. – Revolution Rocks 2012.

They provided a cover of "Ai no Sōretsu" for the January 29, 2020 Buck-Tick tribute album Parade III ~Respective Tracks of Buck-Tick~.

Issay died on August 5, 2023 due to an accident. The surviving members of Der Zibet announced the following month that they had cancelled all future activities.

== Members ==
- Issay (藤崎一成, Fujisaki Issei) – vocals (1984–1996, 2007–2023)
- Hikaru (吉田光, Yoshida Hikaru) – guitar (1984–1996, 2007–2023)
- Hal (川島晴信, Kawashima Harunobu) – bass (1984–1996, 2007–2023)
- Mayumi (三瓶真弓, Sampe Mayumi) – drums (1984–1996, 2007–2023)
- Mahito (藤原真人, Fujiwara Mahito) – keyboard (1984, 2007–2023)

== Discography ==
=== Studio albums ===
	Release date	Title	Format	Label
1	October 21, 1985	Violetter Ball -Murasakiiro no Budoukai- (Violetter Ball-紫色の舞踏会-)	LP	Sixty
1	August 21, 1993	Violetter Ball -Murasakiiro no Budoukai- (Violetter Ball-紫色の舞踏会-)	CD	Sixty
2	February 25, 1987	Electric Moon	LP	Sixty
2	November 23, 1994	Electric Moon and More	CD	Sixty
3	March 21, 1988	Der Zibet	LP	Sixty
3	November 23, 1994	Der Zibet	CD	Sixty
4	November 21, 1988	Garden: Oricon Albums Chart Peak Position: #32	CD	Sixty
4	November 23, 1994	Garden: Oricon Albums Chart Peak Position: #32	CD	Sixty
5	December 10, 1989	Carnival	CD	Sixty
6	October 21, 1990	Homo Demens	CD	Columbia Triad
6	November 21, 1994	Homo Demens	CD	Columbia Triad
7	July 7, 1991	Shishunki I -Upper Side- (思春期I-Upper Side-)	CD	Columbia Triad
8	October 21, 1991	Shishunki II -Downer Side- (思春期II-Downer Side-)	CD	Columbia Triad
9	March 24, 1993	Trash Land	CD	BMG ariola
10	January 21, 1994	Pop Mania	CD	BMG ariola
11	April 21, 1995	Green	CD	BMG ariola
12	March 23, 1996	Kirigirisu (キリギリス)	CD	BMG ariola
13	March 6, 2009	Primitive	CD	Pop Mania Label
14	November 10, 2010	Kaikoteki Mirai ~ Nostalgic Future (懐古的未来～NOSTALGIC FUTURE)	CD	Danger Crue
15	April 25, 2012	Romanoid I	CD	Pop Mania Label
16	July 25, 2012	Romanoid II	CD	Pop Mania Label
17	December 25, 2013	Nine Stories	CD	Pop Mania Label
18	December 25, 2013	Bessekai (別世界)	CD	Pop Mania Label
19	November 07, 2018	Fujouri (不条理)	CD	Pop Mania Label

=== Singles ===
	Release date	Title	Format	Label
1	October 1, 1985	Matsu Uta (待つ歌)	7" Vinyl	Sixty
2	May 21, 1986	Girls -Radical Dance Mix-	7" Vinyl	Sixty
3	February 25, 1987	Baby, I Want You	7" Vinyl	Sixty
4	March 21, 1988	Only "You", Only "Love"	7" Vinyl	Sixty
5	November 21, 1988	Blue Blue	7" Vinyl	Sixty
6	September 25, 1989	Funny Panic	8cm CD	Sixty
7	December 10, 1989	Mammoth no Yoru (マンモスの夜)	8cm CD	Sixty
8	October 1, 1990	Akari wo Keshite (灯りを消して)	8cm CD	Columbia Triad
9	January 21, 1994	Natsu no Hi no Typhoon no You ni (夏の日のタイフーンのように)	8cm CD	BMG ariola
10	March 24, 1995	Nire no Ki no Ue (楡の木の上)	8cm CD	BMG ariola
11	2007	reD biteZ	CD	Not On Label (Self-released)
11	July 13, 2008	reD biteZ	CD	Pop Mania Label

=== Compilation albums ===
Release date	Title	Format	Label
May 1, 1992	Selected '90–'91 BEST	CD	Columbia Triad
May 21, 1996	Selected '90–'91 BEST	CD	Columbia Triad
September 24, 2009	Selected '90–'91 BEST	CD	Columbia Triad
March 24, 1993	Histric Flowers	2 x CD	Sixty
March 23, 1996	Ari (アリ)	CD	BMG ariola
May 10, 2017	20 Seiki (20世紀)	2 x CD	Pop Mania Label
November 11, 2020	21 Seiki (21世紀)	2 x CD	Pop Mania Label
June 19, 2024	Golden Best Sixty Years (ゴールデン☆ベスト Sixty Years)	CD	Warner Music Japan

=== Videos ===
Release date	Title	Format	Label
June 21, 1988	In Concert / Yo-Yo-Yo	VHS	Sixty
July 25, 1988	Yo-Yo-Yo	12" LaserDisc	LaserDisc
January 25, 1989	In Garden	VHS	Sixty
July 26, 1994	Live Mania	VHS	BMG ariola
December 7, 2008	Live at MARZ	DVD	Pop Mania Label
December 9, 2009	Genshiryoku (原始力)	DVD	Pop Mania Label
July 4, 2010	Primitive Tour 2009 ~Winter~	DVD	Pop Mania Label
February 5, 2011	Acoustic Mania	DVD	Pop Mania Label
March 15, 2015	A Day Before 30th Trip	DVD	Pop Mania Label
November 1, 2017	20 Seiki ~ Bessekai no Kyōen (20世紀～別世界の饗宴)	DVD	Pop Mania Label
June 6, 2020	A Day Before 35th Trip	DVD	Pop Mania Label
