= LTD (album) =

EP by Buck-Tick
- Released: March 11, 1998
- Genre: Industrial rock
- Label: Mercury
- Producer: Buck-Tick

Buck-Tick chronology
Sexy Stream Liner (1997)	LTD (1998)	Sweet Strange Live Disc (1998)

LTD is the second mini album, or EP, by Buck-Tick, released only on vinyl on March 11, 1998. Its content is nearly identical to the "Sasayaki" single, the only difference being two more songs ("Kimi ga Shin.. Dara" & "Sexy Stream Liner").

== Track listing ==
=== Side A ===
1. "Kimi ga Shin.. Dara" (キミガシン..ダラ; When...You Die)
2. "Sexy Stream Liner"
3. "Sasayaki" (囁き; Whisper) remixed by Hitoshi Hiruma

=== Side B ===
1. "Thanatos -The Japanic Pig Mix-" (タナトス-The Japanic Pig Mix-) remixed by Raymond Watts (PIG)
2. "My Fuckin' Valentine -Enemy (Full)-" remixed by Günter Schulz (KMFDM)
3. "Schiz・o Gensou -The Spiderman Mix-" (Schiz・o 幻想 -The Spiderman Mix-) remixed by Daniel Ash (Love and Rockets)
