= Metropolis (free magazine) =

English-language magazine in Tokyo, Japan

- Categories: News magazine
- Frequency: Monthly
- Circulation: 30,000 (2006, unverified)
- First issue: February 1994
- Company: Japan Partnership Inc.
- Country: Japan
- Based in: Tokyo
- Language: English
- Website: metropolisjapan.com

Metropolis is a 32-to-48-page free monthly city guide, news and classified ads glossy magazine published by Japan Partnership Inc. targeting the English-speaking community in Tokyo, Japan. As of April 2011, its circulation was claimed to be 30,000.

== History ==
The magazine was first published in 1994 as the Tokyo Classified. Early editions, in the broadsheet style, consisted of classified advertisements sourced from shop notice boards. Initially distributed with the Daily Yomiuri, the free magazine is now distributed across Tokyo and beyond to companies, embassies, hotels, bars and restaurants. The magazine was originally owned and operated by Mark and Mary Devlin, renamed Metropolis in 2001, and sold to Japan Partnership Holdings Inc. in 2007.

Since 1999 the magazine hosted an annual Halloween party "Glitterball" at Roppongi's Velfarre club at other notable clubs around Tokyo. Between 2003 and 2010, Metropolis donated some of the profits each year to the Make-A-Wish Foundation of Japan and the YMCA.

Metropolis is now owned by Japan Partnership Holdings Inc. From 2020, Metropolis became a quarterly magazine, mainly publishing its content online via its website and social media platforms.
