= Akuma to Freud -Devil and Freud- Climax Together =

Akuma to Freud- Climax Together 2004

Video by Buck-Tick
- Released: December 22, 2004
- Recorded: Yokohama Arena (September 11, 2004)
- Label: BMG/Funhouse

Buck-Tick chronology
At the Night Side (2004)	Akuma to Freud- Climax Together 2004 (2004)	13th Floor With Diana (2005)

Akuma to Freud -Devil and Freud- Climax Together (Japanese: 悪魔とフロイト -Devil and Freud- Climax Together) is a live concert DVD by Buck-Tick, released on December 22, 2004. It was filmed on September 11, 2004 at Yokohama Arena. The limited edition box set included a second DVD with multiple angles of several songs, and two CDs of the concert.

== Track listing ==
1. "Calm and Resonance "
2. "21st Cherry Boy"
3. "Buster"
4. "Kick (Daichi o Keru Otoko)" (Kick (大地を蹴る男); Kick (The Man Who Kicked the Earth))
5. "Asylum Garden"
6. "Madman Blues ~Minashigo no Yuutsu~" (Madman Blues ~ミナシ児ノ憂鬱~; Orphan's Depression)
7. "Kimi no Vanilla" (君のヴァニラ; Your Vanilla)
8. "Candy" (キャンディ)
9. "Oukoku Kingdom Come -Moon Rise-" (王国 Kingdom Come -Moon Rise-; Kingdom Kingdom Come -Moon Rise-)
10. "Gensou no Hana" (幻想の花; Flower of Illusion)
11. "Kyokutou Yori Ai wo Komete" (極東より愛を込めて; From the Far East with Love)
12. "Shanikusai -Carnival-" (謝肉祭 -カーニバル-; The Carnival -Carnival-)
13. "Muchi no Namida" (無知の涙;; Tear for Ignorance)
14. "Rakuen (Inori Negai)" ( 楽園 (祈り 希い); Paradise (Prayer Wish) )
15. "Mona Lisa"
16. "Nocturne -Rain Song-"
17. "Jupiter"
18. "Gessekai" (月世界; Lunar World)
19. "Bran-New Lover"
20. "Kodou" (鼓動; Heartbeat)
21. "Physical Neurose"
22. "Cosmos"
