= Theatre Brook =

Japanese band

Theatre Brook シアター・ブルック
- Origin: Tokyo, Japan
- Genres: Funk, funk rock, soul, R&B
- Years active: 1986–present
- Labels: Epic Record Japan (1995–2004); For Life Music Entertainment (2005–2008); Epic Record Japan (2010–2011); King Records (2011–)
- Members: Taiji Sato; Takashi Nakajo; Emerson Kitamura; Takashi Numazawa
- Past members: Akihiro Yoshizawa; Yasuhiro Yonishi; Mitsuhiro Mishima
- Website: www.theatrebrook.com

Theatre Brook (シアター・ブルック Shiatā Burukku) is a Japanese funk rock band formed in 1986. The band's current line-up to date consists of Taiji Sato (vocals & electric guitar), Takashi Nakajo (bass), Takashi Numazawa (drums), and Emerson Kitamura (keyboard). They made their major-label debut in 1995. They are known for performing the first opening theme of the 2010 anime Durarara!!, Uragiri no Yuuyake.

== Band members ==
Current members

- Taiji Sato (佐藤 タイジ, Satō Taiji; born 26 January 1967 in Tokushima, Japan) – lead vocals, lead guitar

He formed the music group "Young Miracle" with Kō Machida in 2002.

- Takashi Nakajo (中條 卓, Nakajō Takashi; born 18 January 1965 in Kanagawa, Japan) – bass

He is also active in the band "couch".

- Emerson Kitamura (エマーソン北村, born 17 May 1962) – keyboards

ex- Mute Beat, ex-Jagatara
He works as a session musician with various musicians like Ego-Wrappin', Kazuyoshi Saito, and Leyona.

- Takashi Numazawa (沼澤 尚, Numazawa Takashi; born 26 January 1967 in Shinjuku, Tokyo, Japan) – drums

He works as a session musician with various musicians like Yuko Ando, Chage, Miki Furukawa, Ken Hirai, Yōsui Inoue, Hiromi Iwasaki, Toshiki Kadomatsu, Ryuichi Kawamura, Inoran, Tourbillon, Kiyoharu, Leyona, Noriyuki Makihara, Kazufumi Miyazawa (AFROSICK), Mika Nakashima, Maki Ohguro, Tamio Okuda, Taeko Onuki, Ai Otsuka, Ami Ozaki, Quruli, Ringo Sheena, Sing Like Talking, Shikao Suga, Ayano Tsuji, Masayoshi Yamazaki, Akiko Yano, Minako Yoshida, YUI.
Because he studied in PIT (Percussion Institute of Technology) in Los Angeles in his youth, he has worked with many American musicians such as Chaka Khan, Bobby Womack, Al McKay, Verdine White, The Emotions, Hiram Bullock, Will Lee, Randy Brecker, Robben Ford, Jeff Berlin.

Former members

- Akihiro Yoshizawa (吉澤 昭広, Yoshizawa Akihiro) – sampling, Moog synthesizer
- Yasuhiro Yonishi (与西 泰博, Yonishi Yasuhiro) – turntabling
- Mitsuhiro Mishima (三嶋 光博, Mishima Mitsuhiro) – drums

== Discography ==
=== Singles ===
- Afuredasu Bakari (あふれ出すばかり, Just Filled Out) (22 November 1995)
- Doreddo Raidā (ドレッドライダー, Dread Rider) (22 May 1996)
- Sutechimae (捨てちまえ, Throw It Away) (1 May 1997)
- Mabataki (まばたき, Blink) (1 August 1997)
- Soul Diver (20 June 1998)
- Mabuta no Urani (まぶたの裏に, Behind the Eyelids) (21 October 1998)
- Nokku shitsuzukeru Otoko (ノックし続ける男, The Man Who Continues Knocking) (21 January 1999)
- Namida no Umi (涙の海, Sea of Tears) (21 May 1999)
- Arittake no Ai (ありったけの愛, Whole Lotta Love) (2 February 2000)
- Shinzō no Mezameru Toki (心臓の目覚める時, When the Heart Wakes Up) (23 March 2000)
- Oretachi Fyūchā (オレタチフューチャー, We Are the Future) (21 May 2003)
- Just (世界で一番SEXYな一日, One Day That Is Most SEXY Day All Over the World) (25 May 2005)
- Uragiri no Yūyake (裏切りの夕焼け, Sunset of Betrayal) (24 February 2010)
- Amsterdam (2024)
- White bear and Bonobo (feat. SEIKO ITO) (2024)

=== Albums ===
- Hi-Kokumin (非国民, Unpatriotic Person) (December 1991) EP
- Sensemilla (September 1993)
- Calm Down (21 June 1995) Mini Album
- Talisman (24 June 1996)
- Tropopause (22 October 1997)
- Typhoon Shelter (12 December 1997) Soundtrack
- Viracocha (20 February 1999)
- Special (23 February 2000) Best of album
- I Am The Space, You Are The Sun (19 April 2000)
- Theatre Brook (4 June 2003)
- 03.04.28 LOFT / 03.06.22 LIQUID ROOM (19 November 2003) Live album
- The Complete Of Theatre Brook (10 March 2004) Best of album
- Reincarnation (22 June 2005)
- Intention (September 2010)
- "Live long and prosper" Tour (27 July 2011) Live album
- Saikin no Kakumei [最近の革命] (12 December 2012)
- LOVE CHANGES THE WORLD (19 July 2015)
- Album Mishuuroku Gakkyoku [アルバム未収録楽曲] (21 August 2019)

=== Other works ===
- "AFRICA feat.Taiji Sato from Theatre Brook" by A Hundred Birds
- "All The Children Are Insain" (August 1988) Vinyl record
  A2. "Shadows of Flowers"
- Parade -Respective Tracks of Buck-Tick- (21 December 2005, "Rokugatsu no Okinawa") Tribute album
  Truck 8. Rokugatsu no Okinawa (六月の沖縄, Okinawa in June)
- Tamio Okuda: Covers (奥田民生・カバーズ) (24 October 2007) Tribute album
  Disc2, Truck 7. Kore wa Uta da (これは歌だ, This Is a Song)
