= Heaven (Buck-Tick song) =

"HEAVEN"
- Regular edition cover

Single by Buck-Tick

from the album Memento Mori
- Released: December 17, 2008
- Genre: Post-Punk, alternative rock
- Length: 8:54
- Label: BMG Japan
- Songwriters: Sakurai, Imai
- Producer: Buck-Tick

Buck-Tick singles chronology
"Alice in Wonder Underground" (2007)	"HEAVEN" (2008)	"Dokudanjou Beauty" (2010)

"HEAVEN" is the twenty-seventh single released by the Japanese rock band Buck-Tick, released on December 17, 2008. It reached number 5 at Oricon Singles Chart and stayed on chart for six weeks.

== Track listing ==
No.	Title	Lyrics	Music	Length
1.	"HEAVEN"	Atsushi Sakurai	Hisashi Imai	5:22
2.	"Makkana Yoru (真っ赤な夜)"	Atsushi Sakurai	Hisashi Imai	3:32

== Personnel ==
- Atsushi Sakurai - Voice
- Hisashi Imai - Guitar
- Hidehiko Hoshino - Guitar
- Yutaka Higuchi - Bass
- Toll Yagami - Drums
- Kazutoshi Yakoyama - keyboards
