= Six/Nine =

Studio album by Buck-Tick
- Released: May 15, 1995; September 21, 1995 (reissue); September 19, 2002 (digital remaster); September 5, 2007 (remaster)
- Recorded: December 1994–March 1995 at Sound Sky Studio in Tokyo; Sound Sky Kawana in Tokyo; Sound Atelier in Osaka; Aobadai Studio in Tokyo; Avaco Studio in Tokyo; Cats Studio in Tokyo; Master Rock Studios in London, England; Crescente Studio in Tokyo
- Genres: Post-punk; industrial rock
- Length: 71:11
- Languages: Japanese, English
- Label: Victor
- Producers: Hitoshi Hiruma, Gary Stout, Buck-Tick and Imai

Buck-Tick chronology
| Darker Than Darkness -Style 93- (1993) | Six/Nine (1995) | Cosmos (1996) |

Singles from Six/Nine
- 1. "Uta" Released: March 24, 1995; 2. "Kodou" Released: April 21, 1995; 3. "Mienai Mono wo Miyou to Suru Gokai Subete Gokai da" Released: September 21, 1995

Six/Nine is the eighth studio album by the Japanese rock band Buck-Tick. It was released in a clear purple case on May 15, 1995, through Victor Entertainment.

It peaked at number one on the Oricon chart. It was certified gold in the same month and sold over 240,760 copies in the first year. The album was digitally remastered and re-released on September 19, 2002 with a bonus track. The album was remastered once again and released on September 5, 2007.

The single "Uta" is band's 2nd best-selling single, with over 200,000 copies sold.

Issay (Der Zibet) provides vocals for "Itoshi no Rock Star".

== Controversy ==
The hard-industrial rock song "Rakuen" (4:48) was released as a B-side to the single "Kodou". An alternative version is featured in the album, entitled "Rakuen (Inori Negai)" (4:37), featuring an oriental arrangement in an instrumental-acoustic style. During the tours the band usually performed the original rock version.

Sakurai's lyrics are socially conscious and critical of the people seeing the political and war situation in the Middle East. They talk how in a country/garden of love and peace (Garden of Eden) suddenly there is bloodshed, children of God kill each other with gunfire, but on the TV it is showcased as a melodrama while "I" (Sakurai, in other sense, the listener/viewer) is indifferent, pretends to show tears and shuts their eyes (willful blindness).

The song caused controversy with the Japanese Islamic community because the album version featured a sample of a passage from the Quran. The album was re-issued with the offending part removed by November 1995 in a clear red case.

== Track listing ==
All lyrics are written by Atsushi Sakurai, except where noted; all music is composed by Hisashi Imai, except where noted.

| No. | Title | Lyrics | Music | Length |
|---|---|---|---|---|
| 1. | "Loop" | | | 4:38 |
| 2. | "love letter" | Imai | | 4:17 |
| 3. | "Kimi no Vanilla" (君のヴァニラ) | | | 4:27 |
| 4. | "Kodou" (鼓動) | | | 6:53 |
| 5. | "Kagirinaku Nezumi" (限りなく鼠) | | | 5:03 |
| 6. | "Rakuen (Inori Negai)" (楽園(祈り 希い)) | | Hidehiko Hoshino | 4:37 |
| 7. | "Hosoi Sen" (細い線) | | Hoshino | 4:34 |
| 8. | "Somewhere Nowhere" | | | 1:26 |
| 9. | "Aikawarazu no "Are" no Katamari ga Nosabaru Hedo no Soko no Fukidamari" (相変わらずの 「アレ」のカタマリがのさばる反吐の底の吹き溜まり) | Imai | | 4:45 |
| 10. | "Detarame Yarou" (デタラメ野郎) | | Imai/Sakurai | 4:52 |
| 11. | "Misshitsu" (密室) | | Hoshino | 4:54 |
| 12. | "Kick (Daichi wo Keru Otoko)" (Kick (大地を蹴る男)) | | | 4:29 |
| 13. | "Itoshi no Rock Star" (愛しのロック・スター) | | Hoshino | 4:51 |
| 14. | "Uta" (唄) | | | 3:59 |
| 15. | "Mienai Mono wo Miyou to Suru Gokai Subete Gokai da" (見えない物を見ようとする誤解 全て誤だ) | | | 4:45 |
| 16. | "Loop MARK II" (Instrumental) | | | 2:23 |
| Total length: | | | | 71:11 |

2002 digital remaster bonus tracks
| No. | Title | Length |
|---|---|---|
| 17. | "Taiyo ni Korosareta" (太陽ニ殺サレタ; live at Omiya Sonic City in Ōmiya, Saitama in 1993) | 7:11 |

== Personnel ==
- Atsushi Sakurai - lead vocals, saxophone
- Hisashi Imai - lead guitar, backing vocals, lead vocals on "Aikawarazu no "Are" no Katamari ga Nosabaru Hedo no Soko no Fukidamari"
- Hidehiko Hoshino - rhythm guitar, keyboards, backing vocals
- Yutaka Higuchi - bass
- Toll Yagami - drums, percussion

Additional performers

- Susanne Bramson - backing vocals
- Aska Strings - violin
- Kazutoshi Yokoyama - keyboards
- Issay - vocals on "Itoshi no Rock Star"

Production

- Hitoshi Hiruma; Gary Stout - producers, recording, mixing
- Hisashi Imai; Buck-Tick - producers
- Takafumi Muraki; Osamu Takagi - executive producers
- Hirohito Fujishima; Shinichi Ishizuka - engineers
- Kenichi Arai; Hiroshi Tanigawa - assistant engineers
- Kazushige Yamazaki - mastering
- Ken Sakaguchi - graphic design
- Robert Longo - cover art
- M-Hasui - photography
