= Dress (Buck-Tick song) =

1993 single by Buck-Tick

Single by Buck-Tick

from the album Darker Than Darkness -Style 93-
- Released: May 21, 1993
- Recorded: February 20–April 30, 1993
- Genre: Industrial rock, dream pop, alternative rock, gothic rock
- Length: 9:54
- Label: Victor Entertainment
- Composer: Hidehiko Hoshino
- Lyricist: Atsushi Sakurai
- Producer: Buck-Tick

Buck-Tick singles chronology
"Jupiter" (1991)	"Dress" (1993)	"Die" (1993)

Music video
- "Dress" on YouTube

"Dress (Blood Trinity Mix)"

Single by Buck-Tick
- Released: April 20, 2005
- Venue: Omiya Sonic City (July 28 and 29, 1993)
- Length: 6:36
- Label: Victor
- Composer: Hidehiko Hoshino
- Lyricist: Atsushi Sakurai

Buck-Tick singles chronology
"Romance" (2005)	"Dress (Blood Trinity Mix)" (2005)	"Kagerou" (2006)

"Dress" (Japanese: ドレス, Hepburn: Doresu) is the seventh single by Japanese rock band Buck-Tick, released on May 21, 1993. The song was written by vocalist Atsushi Sakurai, composed by guitarist Hidehiko Hoshino, and produced by the band themselves. It was the first single released off of their seventh studio album Darker Than Darkness -Style 93-, which was released a month later. It reached number 5 on the Oricon Singles Chart. It is band's fourth best-selling single, with over 171,000 copies sold.

In 2005, the song was remixed and used as the opening theme of the Trinity Blood anime adaptation. This version was released as the band's twenty-third single on April 20, 2005, under the title "Dress (Bloody Trinity Mix)" (ドレス (bloody trinity mix)), and peaked at number 24 on the Oricon chart.

== Track listing ==
=== 1993 release ===
All tracks arranged by Buck-Tick.

No.	Title	Lyrics	Music	Length
1.	"Dress" (ドレス)	Atsushi Sakurai	Hidehiko Hoshino	6:00
2.	"Rokugatsu no Okinawa" (六月の沖縄)	Sakurai	Hoshino	3:54

=== 2005 release ===
All lyrics are written by Sakurai.

No.	Title	Music	Length
1.	"Dress (Bloody Trinity Mix)" (ドレス (bloody trinity mix))	Hoshino	6:36
2.	"Rokugatsu no Okinawa (Live)" (六月の沖縄 (Live))	Hoshino	3:55
3.	"Yūwaku (Live)" (誘惑 (Live))	Hoshino	5:51
4.	"Zero (Live)"	Hisashi Imai	4:04
5.	"Dress (Live)" (ドレス (Live))	Hoshino	6:37

== Personnel ==
Buck-Tick

- Atsushi Sakurai – vocals
- Hisashi Imai – guitar
- Hidehiko Hoshino – guitar, piano, synthesizer
- Yutaka Higuchi – bass
- Toll Yagami – drums, percussion

Other performers

- Rie Hamada – backing vocals (1993 version)
- Kazutoshi Yokoyama – manipulations (1993 version)

== Other versions ==
A different mix of "Dress", subtitled the "Aux Send Mix", was included on the 2002 remastered version of Darker Than Darkness -Style 93-.

Japanese rock band Abingdon Boys School recorded a cover version of "Dress" for Parade -Respective Tracks of Buck-Tick-, a tribute album that was released on December 21, 2005, to celebrate Buck-Tick's 20th anniversary. Vocalist Takanori Nishikawa had known Buck-Tick from his time at the same management company when he was in the band Luis-Mary. As his seniors, he said Buck-Tick took care of him often, but he had never returned the favor. So when the offer for the tribute album came up, he and the other members of Abingdon Boys School jumped at the chance. Keyboardist Toshiyuki Kishi listened to the original and various remixes of "Dress" and grew fond of the song. He felt the melody line had a "sad feeling, which was great, and I thought we could make it into something dramatic." Nishikawa remarked that "Jupiter" was the song he really wanted to do, "but its impression on me was too strong. I liked the original song too much, so I couldn't really touch it. (laugh)" Due to the original's lack of typical guitar phrases or rhythm, Sunao said he was able to add his own guitar parts freely. Abingdon Boys School's version of "Dress" was later included on their 2007 self-titled album.

Additionally, Theatre Brook covered "Rokugatsu no Okinawa" for the Parade -Respective Tracks of Buck-Tick- album.
