= Darker Than Darkness: Style 93 =

Studio album by Buck-Tick
- Released: June 23, 1993
- Recorded: February 20 – April 30, 1993
- Studios: Sound Sky Studio, Tokyo
- Genres: Post-punk; industrial rock
- Length: 61:56
- Languages: Japanese, English
- Label: Victor
- Producers: Hitoshi Hiruma and Buck-Tick

Buck-Tick chronology
Kurutta Taiyou (1991)	Darker Than Darkness: Style 93 (1993)	Six/Nine (1995)

Singles from Darker Than Darkness: Style 93
- 1. "Dress" Released: May 21, 1993; 2. "Die" Released: October 21, 1993; 3. "Dress (Bloody Trinity Mix)" Released: April 2, 2005

Darker Than Darkness: Style 93 is the seventh studio album by the Japanese rock band Buck-Tick. It was released on June 23, 1993, through Victor Entertainment. The album peaked at number two on the Oricon chart, became a certified gold seller by July 1993, and subsequently sold 213,260 copies. Darker Than Darkness: Style 93 was digitally remastered and re-released on September 19, 2002, with two bonus tracks. It was remastered and re-released again on September 5, 2007. "Dress" was remixed and used as the opening theme for the anime Trinity Blood (2005), this version was also released as a single. The album was named one of the top albums from 1989 to 1998 in a 2004 issue of the music magazine Band Yarouze.

== Track listing ==
All lyrics are written by Atsushi Sakurai, except where noted; all music is composed by Hisashi Imai, except where noted.

No.	Title	Length
1.	"Kirameki no Naka de..." (キラメキの中で...)	4:41
2.	"Deep Slow"	4:32
3.	"Yuuwaku" (誘惑; music written by Hidehiko Hoshino)	5:58
4.	"Ao no Sekai" (青の世界)	4:57
5.	"Kamikaze" (神風; lyrics written by Imai)	4:45
6.	"Zero"	4:05
7.	"Dress" (ドレス; music written by Hoshino)	6:22
8.	"Lion"	4:31
9.	"Madman Blues (Minashigo no Yuuutsu)" (Madman Blues -ミナシ児ノ憂鬱-; lyrics written by Imai)	5:12
10.	"Die"	4:34
93.	"D.T.D" (hidden track)	6:42
Total length:		61:56

2002 digital remaster
No.	Title	Length
11.	"D.T.D"	6:42
12.	"Dress" (Aux Send Mix)	7:41
13.	"Die" (live)	5:25

== Personnel ==
- Atsushi Sakurai – lead vocals
- Hisashi Imai – lead guitar, backing vocals, lead vocals on "Madman Blues"
- Hidehiko Hoshino – rhythm guitar, keyboards, synthesizers, backing vocals, piano
- Yutaka Higuchi – bass guitar
- Toll Yagami – drums, percussion

Additional performers

- Rie Hamada – backing vocals on "Dress"
- Kazutoshi Yokoyama – backing vocals on "Dress" and "Kirameki no Naka De"

Production

- Hitoshi Hiruma – producer, recording, mixing
- Buck-Tick – producers
- Osamu Takagi; Takafumi Muraki – executive producers
- Shigetoshi Naitoh; Takahiro Uchida – engineer
- Hirohito Fujishima; Katsumi Moriya – assistant engineers
- Ken Sakaguchi – cover art, graphic design
- M. Hasui – photography

== Notes ==
- On the originally released 1993 CD, after track ten it skips to track #75, titled "Not T Dise", after that the CD skips to track #84, titled "Kirameki no Naka de" and finally after that, it skips to track #93, titled "D-T-D". The names of these hidden bonus tracks were only given in a magazine published at the time. The digital remaster release includes "D-T-D" (credited; lyrics: Sakurai, music: Imai), but not "Not T Dise" or "Kirameki no Naka de".
