= Jupiter (Buck-Tick song) =

Single by Buck-Tick

from the album Kurutta Taiyou
- Released: October 30, 1991
- Recorded: 1990
- Genre: Rock
- Length: 10:57
- Label: Victor Entertainment
- Songwriter(s): Lyrics: Atsushi Sakurai; Music: Hidehiko Hoshino
- Producer(s): Buck-Tick

Buck-Tick singles chronology
"M・A・D" (1991)	"Jupiter" (1991)	"Dress" (1993)

"Jupiter" is the sixth single released by the Japanese rock band Buck-Tick, released on October 30, 1991. It is labeled with Victor Entertainment. It appeared 9 times in the Oricon Chart during 1991.

== Track listing ==
#	Title	Length	Lyrics	Music
1	"Jupiter"	4:40	Atsushi Sakurai	Hidehiko Hoshino
2	"Sakura (さくら)"	6:17	Atsushi Sakurai	Hisashi Imai

== Musicians ==
- Atsushi Sakurai - Voice
- Hisashi Imai - Guitar
- Hidehiko Hoshino - Guitar
- Yutaka Higuchi - Bass
- Toll Yagami - Drums
