= Just One More Kiss (Buck-Tick song) =

Single by Buck-Tick

from the album Taboo
- Released: October 26, 1988
- Recorded: July 7–14, 1988
- Genre: Post-punk
- Length: 10:05
- Label: Victor
- Composer: Hisashi Imai
- Lyricist: Atsushi Sakurai
- Producer: Buck-Tick

Buck-Tick singles chronology
"To-Search" (1986)	"Just One More Kiss" (1988)	"Aku no Hana" (1990)

Music video
- "Just One More Kiss" on YouTube

"Just One More Kiss" is the second single by the Japanese rock band Buck-Tick. It was released on October 26, 1988 by Victor Entertainment as the band's major label debut.

== Description ==
It was the second single released by Buck-Tick in two years. It reached number 6 on the Oricon Chart and charted for 20 weeks. It is band's 5th best-selling single, with over 147,000 copies sold.

The song earned the band a nomination for Best New Artist at the 30th Japan Record Awards.

== Track listing ==
Track	Title	Length	Lyrics	Music
1	"Just One More Kiss"	5:06	Atsushi Sakurai	Hisashi Imai
2	"To-Search"	4:59	Hisashi Imai	Hisashi Imai

== Musicians ==
- Atsushi Sakurai - Voice
- Hisashi Imai - Electric guitar
- Hidehiko Hoshino - Electric and acoustic guitar
- Yutaka Higuchi - bass
- Toll Yagami - Drums

== See also ==
- 1988 in Japanese music
