= Kurutta Taiyou =

Studio album by Buck-Tick
- Released: February 21, 1991; September 19, 2002 (digital remaster); September 5, 2007 (remaster)
- Recorded: September 13-November 20, 1990
- Studio: Victor (Tokyo)
- Genre: Post-punk; industrial rock
- Length: 54:06
- Language: Japanese, English
- Label: Victor
- Producer: Buck-Tick

Buck-Tick chronology
Aku no Hana (1990)	Kurutta Taiyou (1991)	Darker Than Darkness -Style 93- (1993)

Singles from Kurutta Taiyou
- 1. "Speed" Released: January 21, 1991; 2. "M・A・D" Released: June 5, 1991; 3. "Jupiter" Released: October 30, 1991

Kurutta Taiyou (狂った太陽, "Lunatic Sun") is the sixth studio album by the Japanese rock band Buck-Tick. It was released on cassette and CD on February 21, 1991, through Victor Entertainment. The album was digitally remastered and re-released on September 19, 2002, with two bonus tracks. It was remastered and re-released again on September 5, 2007. "Speed", "M・A・D" and "Jupiter" were later re-recorded for the group's compilation album Koroshi no Shirabe: This Is Not Greatest Hits (1992).

The album peaked at number two on the Oricon charts. It was certified platinum (400,000 copies sold) within a month of its release, and has sold 326,580 copies during its run in the Oricon album chart.

The album earned the band a nomination for Best Album at the 33rd Japan Record Awards. It was named number 40 on Bounce's 2009 list of 54 Standard Japanese Rock Albums.

== Track listing ==
All lyrics are written by Atsushi Sakurai, except where noted; all music is composed by Hisashi Imai, except where noted.

No.	Title	Length
1.	"Speed" (スピード)	4:47
2.	"Machine"	4:14
3.	"My Funny Valentine"	4:37
4.	"Henshin (Reborn)" (変身 (REBORN); music written by Hidehiko Hoshino)	4:18
5.	"Angelfish" (エンジェル フィッシュ; music written by Hoshino)	4:26
6.	"Jupiter" (music written by Hoshino)	4:39
7.	"Sakura" (さくら)	6:17
8.	"Brain, Whisper, Head, Hate Is Noise" (lyrics written by Imai)	5:53
9.	"M・A・D"	4:34
10.	"Chikashitsu no Melody" (地下室のメロディー)	4:05
11.	"Taiyou ni Korosareta" (太陽ニ殺サレタ)	6:06
Total length:		54:06

2002 digital remaster bonus tracks
No.	Title	Length
12.	"Narcissus" (music written by Hoshino)	4:12
13.	"Angelic Conversation" (re-recorded version)	5:35

== Personnel ==
- Atsushi Sakurai - lead vocals
- Hisashi Imai - lead guitar, backing vocals
- Hidehiko Hoshino - rhythm guitar, backing vocals
- Yutaka Higuchi - bass
- Toll Yagami - drums

Additional performers

- Tsutomu Nakayama - keyboards
- Takeharu Hayakawa - electric cello
- Hidekazu Tokumitsu - string arrangement

Production

- Buck-Tick - producers
- Osamu Takagi - executive producer
- Hitoshi Hiruma - engineer, mixing
- Yasuaki Shindoh; Makoto Kondoh; Shigetoshi Naitoh; Takashi Aonuma; Fumio Hasegawa; Hirohito Fujishima - assistant engineers
- Higashi Ishida - art coordination
- Ken Sakaguchi - cover art, graphic design
- Atsushi Ueda - photography
