= Aku no Hana (song) =

"Aku no Hana ( 悪の華)"

Single by Buck-Tick

from the album Aku no Hana
- Released: January 24, 1990
- Genre: Gothic rock, punk rock, surf punk, alternative rock, post-punk
- Length: 7:55
- Label: Victor Entertainment
- Composer: Hisashi Imai
- Lyricist: Atsushi Sakurai
- Producer: Buck-Tick

Buck-Tick singles chronology
"Just One More Kiss" (1988)	"Aku no Hana ( 悪の華)" (1990)	"Speed" (1991)

Music video
- "惡の華" on YouTube

Aku no Hana (悪の華) (Literal translation: "Evil's flowers") is the third single released by the Japanese rock band Buck-Tick, released on January 24, 1990, and labeled with Victor Entertainment.

The song ranked first in the Oricon Chart selling 104,470 copies during the first week of February 1990. It is band's best-selling single, with over 221,000 copies sold.

== Track listing ==
All music is composed by Hisashi Imai.

No.	Title	Lyrics	Length
1.	"Aku no Hana" (悪の華)	Atsushi Sakurai	4:14
2.	"Under the Moon Light"	Yutaka Higuchi	3:40
Total length:			7:55

== Musicians ==
- Atsushi Sakurai – Voice
- Hisashi Imai – Guitar
- Hidehiko Hoshino – Guitar
- Yutaka Higuchi – Bass
- Toll Yagami – Drums

== See also ==
- 1990 in Japanese music
