= Aku no Hana =

Studio album by Buck-Tick
- Released: February 1, 1990; September 19, 2002 (digital remaster); September 5, 2007 (remaster)
- Recorded: October–December 1989 at Victor Aoyama Studio in Tokyo
- Genres: Gothic rock; post-punk
- Length: 45:09
- Languages: Japanese, English
- Label: Victor
- Producers: Tsutomu Nakayama and Buck-Tick

Buck-Tick chronology
Taboo (1989)	Aku no Hana (1990)	Kurutta Taiyou (1991)

Singles from Aku no Hana
- 1. "Aku no Hana" Released: January 24, 1990

Aku no Hana (悪の華; "Flowers of Evil") is the fifth studio album by the Japanese rock band Buck-Tick. It was released on cassette and CD on February 1, 1990, through Victor Entertainment. It peaked at number one on the Oricon charts and is the group's best-selling album to date. It was certified gold in the month of its release, and sold 435,080 copies in the first year of its release. The title comes from Charles Baudelaire's volume of poetry, Les Fleurs du mal.

== Releases ==
The album was digitally remastered and re-released on September 19, 2002, with two bonus tracks. It was remastered and re-released again on September 5, 2007. "Aku no Hana" and "Love Me" were later re-recorded for the group's compilation album Koroshi no Shirabe: This Is Not Greatest Hits (1992).

On February 1, 2014, Aku no Hana was re-released again as a digital remaster to celebrate 25 years since its release, giving the songs the sound they imagined and would like them to originally have but couldn't due to limits of the equipment. It was released in three editions: a regular edition remastered album, a video album of the music videos, and a remastered limited edition collector's set format called 惡の華 -Completeworks-. The last contained the album as a vinyl LP, photo cards, remasters of the music videos from the album on DVD and Blu-ray, the 2015 Re-mix album as a Platinum SHM CD, and the 惡の華/Under The Moonlight 2015 Re-mix single also as a Platinum SHM CD.

== Track listing ==
All lyrics are written by Atsushi Sakurai, except where noted; all music is composed by Hisashi Imai, except where noted.

No.	Title	Length
1.	"National Media Boys" (lyrics written by Imai)	4:26
2.	"Maboroshi no Miyako" (幻の都)	3:59
3.	"Love Me"	3:15
4.	"Pleasure Land" (lyrics and music written by Hidehiko Hoshino)	5:00
5.	"Misty Blue"	4:23
6.	"Dizzy Moon" (lyrics written by Toll Yagami; music written by Hoshino)	3:25
7.	"Sabbat" (music written by Hoshino)	5:08
8.	"The World Is Yours"	4:52
9.	"Aku no Hana" (悪の華)	4:18
10.	"Kiss Me Good-Bye"	6:17
Total length:		45:09

2002 digital remaster bonus tracks
No.	Title	Length
11.	"Aku no Hana" (single version)	4:10
12.	"Under the Moonlight" (lyrics written by Yutaka Higuchi)	3:41

== Personnel ==
- Atsushi Sakurai – lead vocals
- Hisashi Imai – lead guitar, backing vocals
- Hidehiko Hoshino – rhythm guitar, backing vocals
- Yutaka Higuchi – bass
- Toll Yagami – drums

Additional performers

- Tsutomu Nakayama – keyboards

Production

- Tsutomu Nakayama; Buck-Tick – producers
- Will Gosling – engineer, mixing
- Jun Kanazawa – assistant engineer
- Ken Sakaguchi – cover art, graphic design
- Bruno Dayan – photography

== See also ==
- 1990 in Japanese music
