= Fanatic Crisis discography =

- Studio albums: 9
- EPs: 2
- Demo albums: 1
- Compilation albums: 3
- Singles: 31
- Video albums: 23

Fanatic Crisis' discography consists of 9 studio albums, 2 EPs, 31 singles (plus 8 limited singles), 3 compilation albums, 23 music videos and video albums, and 1 demo.

Fanatic Crisis was a Japanese visual kei rock band active between 1992 and 2005, earning the title of one of the “Four Heavenly Kings of Visual Kei” of the 1990s (alongside Malice Mizer, Shazna, and La'cryma Christi). While growing alongside the Nagoya kei scene, they released their first EP Taiyou no Toriko (太陽の虜). With their debut studio album Mask (1996), the band began its transition from the Nagoya gothic rock to pop rock. Following the release of the EP Marble, they signed with a major label, debuting with the single “Super Soul” and the album One -one for all-, which became their highest-charting album on the Oricon chart, peaking at number five. However, their next album, The.Lost.Innocent, is the band's best-selling. The next album, EAS, accompanied the EAS Syndrome tour, which was recorded and released on DVD, and was preceded by Pop. After three more albums, including the holiday special Beautiful World, Marvelous+ was released in 2004 and turned out to be the group's final album.

In 2019, three of the members—Tsutomu Ishizuki, Kazuya, and Shun—reunited as Fantastic Circus and released re-recordings of their singles in two compilation albums, Tenseism Best Singles [1997-2000] and Tenseism Best Singles [2001-2004].

== Studio albums ==
Title	Details	Chart peak position		Sales
Title	Details	Oricon	Billboard Japan	Sales
Noir (indies)
Mask	January 7, 1996	—		
For Life
One -one for all-	March 4, 1998	5	9	119,360
The.Lost.Innocent	February 24, 1999	6	7	162,110
Stoic Stone
EAS	September 13, 2000	11	15	23,180
Pop	June 27, 2001	19	—	19,200
5	July 10, 2002	24	—	16,090
Neverland	July 2, 2003	32	—	10,133
Marvelous+	July 28, 2004	18	—	13,451
"—" notes that the recording did not appear on this chart, or that its position could not be found, or that sales were not recorded.

== EPs ==
Title	Release	Oricon peak position	Sales
Taiyou no Toriko (太陽の虜)	December 1, 1994	—	5,000
Taiyou no Toriko (太陽の虜)	April 28, 1995 (re-release)	—	—
Marble	November 25, 1996	47	16,830
Marble	May 19, 1999 (re-release)	85	2,490
Beautiful World	December 6, 2001	30	14,690
"—" notes that the recording did not appear on this chart and sales were not counted.

== Compilations ==
Title	Release	Oricon peak position	Sales
THE BEST of FANATIC◇CRISIS Single Collection 01	March 30, 2005	50	6,602
THE BEST of FANATIC◇CRISIS Single Collection 02	March 30, 2005	—	5,997
THE BEST of FANATIC◇CRISIS B-Side Collection	August 9, 2006	—	983

== Singles ==
Title	Release	Chart peak position		Sales
Title	Release	Oricon	Billboard Japan	Sales
"Truth"	January 7, 1996	—		
"Memories in White"	January 7, 1996	—		
"Tsuki no Hana" (月の花)	July 5, 1996	44	—	13,710
"Rain"	July 5, 1996	47	—	13,680
"Super Soul"	August 6, 1997	23	—	39,780
"Sleeper"	October 29, 1997	23	—	52,330
"One -you are the one-"	January 28, 1998	14	19	94,800
"Rainy merry-go-round"	May 13, 1998	15	19	73,050
"Hinotori" (火の鳥)	July 1, 1998	10	8	136,880
"Maybe true"	September 23, 1998	5	4	112,190
"Beauties -beauty eyes-/Jealousy" (ジェラシー)	January 1, 1999	12	13	81,250
"7 [SEVEN]"	April 14, 1999	6	—	69,290
"Side Eve"	November 17, 1999	—		
"Side Adam"	December 16, 1999	—		
"Kokoro ni Hana o Kokoro ni Toge o" (心に花を 心に棘を)	May 17, 2000	20	—	22,210
"Behind"	August 9, 2000	20	—	27,610
"Defect Lover Complex"	August 9, 2000	26	—	18,420
"Life"	October 25, 2000	30	—	14,440
"hal [ハル]"	February 16, 2001	28	—	25,760
"Jet hyp!"	April 11, 2001	22	—	13,140
"Yuragi" (ゆらぎ)	May 30, 2001	27	—	13,080
"Down Code" (ダウンコード)	October 3, 2001	10	—	24,440
"Sputnik -Tabibitotachi-" (スプートニク -旅人たち-)	February 6, 2002	25	—	15,600
"Love Monster"	April 11, 2002	15	21	12,570
"Dracula" (ドラキラ)	June 12, 2002	10	18	21,940
"Blue Rose"	November 7, 2002	28	—	10,840
"Yumejanai sekai." (夢じゃない世界。)	January 16, 2003	15	20	11,024
"moonlight"	April 16, 2003	20	23	8,482
"Tsuki no Mahō" (月の魔法)	November 6, 2003	37	—	5,668
"Karasu" (鴉＜KARASU＞)	January 9, 2004	22	—	12,934
"everlove"	May 12, 2004	10	—	26,903
"—" notes that the recording did not appear on this chart, or that its position could not be found, or that sales were not recorded.

=== Limited singles ===
Title	Release	Format	Notes
Disappear n'	August 2, 1995	VHS	Distributed at a concert at Meguro Rokumeikan. Also considered to be a demo.
P・E・R・S・O・N・A	August 14, 1995	VHS	Distributed at a concert at Namba Rockets.
Kuroi Taiyō (黒い太陽, remake version)	August 18, 1995	VHS	Distributed at a concert at Nagoya Club Quattro.
Sleepless Merry-Go-Round (1995 original new version)	September 10, 1998	8cm CD	Distributed at a concert at Shibuya Club Quattro.
Eien no Kodomodachi -the Eternal child- (永遠の子供達 -the Eternal child-)	January 10, 1997	CD	Distributed at a concert at Shibuya Public Hall.
Harinezumi。 VS DOBU◇NEZUMI	March 11, 2003	CD	Distributed at the concerts Truth Gentei Event fan club only between April and March 2001.
you.	December 2002	CD	Distribution limited to the fan club.
holy song	December 24, 2004	CD	Distribution limited to the fan club.

== Videos ==
Title	Release	Format
Truth	August 21, 1995	VHS
Making of Truth Tour Final	September 1995	VHS
Tsuki no Hana/Rain	July 5, 1996	VHS
GROOVERS FILE MIX	April 21, 1997	VHS
des[clip]tion-1	July 18, 1998	VHS
des[clip]tion-2	July 28, 1998	VHS
des[clip]tion-3	September 27, 2000	DVD
LIFE	January 1, 2001	VHS
EAS SYNDROME FILES	March 28, 2001	DVD
des[clip]tion-4	July 28, 2001	DVD
Down Code	November 7, 2001	VHS
Sputnik -Tabibitotachi-	March 6, 2002	VHS
Love Monster	May 9, 2002	VHS
des[clip]tion-5	August 28, 2002	DVD
Blue Rose	December 4, 2002	VHS
Yumejanai sekai.	February 19, 2003	VHS
documents 22	March 19, 2003	DVD
moonlight	May 14, 2003	VHS
des[clip]tion-6	December 3, 2003	DVD
Karasu	February 11, 2004	DVD
Fanatic◇Crisis tour 2004 [dear marvelous encore] at Tokyo Hibiya Yagaiongakudo	February 16, 2005	DVD
The Best of Fanatic◇Crisis des[clip]tion	May 11, 2005	DVD
Last Live	November 16, 2005	DVD

== Demos ==
- Karma (カルマ, September 1994)

== Participations ==
- Cry-Max Pleasure Super ~Loud,Trance and Violence for Extacy~ (May 24, 1995)
- 1995 Last live at Nagoya Diamond Hall (April 18, 1995)
- Emergency Express 1996 ~Do You Feel The Next Vibe!~ (April 25, 1996)
- The End of the Century Rockers II (June 21, 1996)
- Shock Wave '96 (October 1, 1996)

== As Fantastic Circus ==
Compilation albums

- TENSEISM BEST SINGLES [1997-2000] (March 29, 2023)
- TENSEISM BEST SINGLES [2001-2004] (February 28, 2024)

Singles

- "One -You are the one-" (2023, digital)
