= Lhasa (La'cryma Christi album) =

Studio album by La'cryma Christi
- Released: November 25, 1998
- Genre: Rock
- Length: 50:05
- Label: Polydor
- Producer: Hajime Okano

La'cryma Christi chronology
Sculpture of Time (1997)	Lhasa (1998)	Magic theatre (2000)

Singles from Lhasa
- 1. "With-you" Released: May 8, 1998; 2. "Mirai Kōro" Released: August 26, 1998

Lhasa is the fourth studio album by Japanese rock band La'cryma Christi, released on November 25, 1998 by Polydor.

The singles of the album are "With-you", song for the television program Sunday Jungle, and "Mirai Kōro" (未来航路), ending theme for the anime Nightwalker, with a different mix. In addition, the title track "Lhasa" was included on the single “In Forest.”

== Commercial performance and reception ==
Lhasa was released during a national tour and was produced by Hajime Okano. The magazine CD Journal reviewed the album favorably, citing that the composition and arrangement "gives a deep sense of beauty" and that Lhasa's quality is different from their previous album, Sculpture of Time.

The album peaked at 8th on the Oricon Albums Chart and remained on the chart for eight weeks. It sold 163,970 copies in it first week and was certified platinum by RIAJ for selling over 400,000 copies in total, becoming the best-selling album of the band.

Meanwhile, "With-you" and "Mirai Kōro" reached 10th and 3rd place and sold approximately 191,000 and 169,000 copies, respectively, and are the band's best-selling singles. The band DaizyStripper covered “With-you” on the compilation album Crush! -90's V-Rock Best Hit Cover Songs-, released on January 26, 2011, featuring current visual kei bands covering bands that were important to the visual kei movement of the 1990s. Following that, Blu-Billion covered “Mirai Kōro” for the album Crush! 2 -V-Rock Best Hit Cover Songs-, released on November 23, 2011.

== Track listing ==
No.	Title	Length
1.	"Mirai Kōro" (未来航路)	3:52
2.	"Tsuki no Mabuta" (月の瞼)	4:08
3.	"With-you"	5:15
4.	"Shy"	4:11
5.	"Lhasa"	5:37
6.	"Green"	4:11
7.	"Pyscho Stalker"	3:42
8.	"Frozen Spring"	5:56
9.	"Tori ni Naruhi" (鳥になる日)	5:22
10.	"Zambara"	7:18
Total length:		50:05

== Personnel ==
- Taka – vocals, keyboard
- Hiro – lead guitar
- Koji – rhythm guitar
- Shuse – bass
- Levin – drums
