= EAS (album) =

Studio album by Fanatic Crisis
- Released: September 13, 2000
- Genres: Alternative rock; power pop
- Length: 47:00
- Label: Stoic Stone

Fanatic Crisis chronology
The.Lost.Innocent (1999)	EAS (2000)	Pop (2001)

Singles from EAS
- 1. "Kokoro ni Hana wo, Kokoro ni Toge wo" Released: May 17, 2000; 2. "Behind" Released: August 9, 2000; 3. "Defect Lover Complex" Released: August 9, 2000

EAS is the fourth studio album by Japanese rock band Fanatic Crisis and their first release with the label Stoic Stone on September 13, 2000. The original mixes of Purple & Psychic Honey, Sonzai Riyuu to Sonzai Ishiki, and Be You were featured on the Side Adam and Side Eve EPs.

The album features three singles, "Kokoro ni Hana o Kokoro ni Toge o" (心に花を 心に棘を), "Behind", used as key music for television programs Rhythm Baby and 20-Sai no Kekkon (20歳の結婚) respectively, and "Defect Lover Complex". The band's tours in promotion of the album took place throughout 2000, named Eas Syndrome. The 2001 Eas Syndrome Files music video collection also features behind-the-scenes footage from the tour.

In 2019, vocalist Tsutomu Ishizuki and guitarist Kazuya and Shun reunited as a subunit of the band, called Fantastic Circus. Singles from the album were included on the greatest hits album Tenseism released by them in March 2023.

== Musical style and themes ==
The album's name, which is an acronym for Envisage as Spiral, means "to envision a spiral scale in your mind." Regarding the song "Behind", the website CD Journal states that it starts with heavy guitar and bass, but becomes pop when the vocals come in. HMV commented that the sound had changed significantly compared to the band's first major album, One -one for all-.

== Commercial performance ==
EAS peaked at number 11 on Oricon Albums Chart, staying on chart for three weeks. It sold 23,180 copies while on the chart, making it the band's third best-selling album, behind their previous albums The.Lost.Innocent and One -one for all-. On Billboard Japan, it debuted at 15th place.

"Kokoro ni Hana o Kokoro ni Toge o" (心に花を 心に棘を), "Behind" and "Defect Lover Complex" reached 20th, 20th and 26th position on Oricon Singles Chart, respectively.

== Track listing ==
All lyrics are written by Tsutomu Ishizuki.

No.	Title	Music	Length
1.	"Spiral Age" (スパイラルエイジ)	Tsutomu Ishizuki	5:16
2.	"Purple & Psychic Honey (EAS Mix)"	Tsutomu Ishizuki	5:06
3.	"Kokoro ni Hana wo, Kokoro ni Toge wo" (心に花を 心に棘を)	Tsutomu Ishizuki	4:27
4.	"Scratch 69"	Fanatic Crisis	4:00
5.	"Defect Lover Complex"	Fanatic Crisis	3:52
6.	"EAS"	Tsutomu Ishizuki	3:22
7.	"Sonzai Riyuu to Sonzai Ishiki (EAS Mix)" (存在理由と存在意識)	Tsutomu Ishizuki	6:00
8.	"Erase You"	Fanatic Crisis	3:27
9.	"Be You (EAS Mix)"	Tsutomu Ishizuki	5:07
10.	"Behind"	Tsutomu Ishizuki	4:04
11.	"Hoshi ni Negai wo" (星に願いを)	Tsutomu Ishizuki	5:18
Total length:			47:00

== Personnel ==
- Tsutomu Ishizuki − vocals
- Kazuya − lead guitar
- Shun − rhythm guitar
- Ryuji − bass
- Tohru − drums
