= Maybe True =

"Maybe true"

Single by Fanatic Crisis

from the album The.Lost.Innocent
- Language: Japanese
- B-side: "Precious memories"
- Released: September 23, 1998
- Genre: Rock
- Length: 19:44
- Label: For Life Records
- Lyricist: Tsutomu Ishizuki

Fanatic Crisis singles chronology
"Hinotori" (1998)	"Maybe true" (1998)	"Beauties -beauty eyes-/Jealousy" (1999)

"Maybe True" is the tenth single by the Japanese rock band Fanatic Crisis, released on September 23, 1998, by For Life Records and included on the album The.Lost.Innocent. The song was used as the opening theme for the anime Let's Nupu Nupu.

"Maybe true" was included in the greatest hits compilation THE BEST of FANATIC◇CRISIS Single Collection 01, released following the band's breakup. In 2023, it was re-recorded and released on the album TENSEISM BEST SINGLES [1997-2000], created following the reunion of three of the band members.

== Commercial performance ==
It reached fourth place on the Billboard Japan and No. 5 on the Oricon Singles Chart, where it remained for seven weeks. It is the Fanatic Crisis single that reached the highest position on the charts.

It sold 112,190 copies, making it the band's second-best-selling single, behind the previous one "Hinotori".

== Track listing ==
All lyrics are written by Tsutomu Ishizuki.

No.	Title	Length
1.	"Maybe true"
2.	"Precious memories"
3.	"Maybe true" (Vox Less Version)
4.	"Precious memories" (Vox Less Version)
Total length:		19:44

== Personnel ==
- Tsutomu Ishizuki − vocals
- Kazuya − lead guitar
- Shun − rhythm guitar
- Ryuji − bass
- Tohru − drums
