= Sasayaki (Buck-Tick song) =

Single by Buck-Tick

from the album Sexy Stream Liner
- Released: March 11, 1998
- Recorded: 1998
- Genre: Rock; industrial rock; alternative rock
- Length: 22:00
- Label: Mercury Records
- Songwriters: Atsushi Sakurai, Hisashi Imai (remix)
- Producer: Hiruma Sei

Buck-Tick singles chronology
"Heroine" (1997)	"Sasayaki" (1998)	"Gessekai" (1998)

"Sasayaki" (囁き) (English: whisper) is the fourteenth single released by the Japanese rock band Buck-Tick, released on March 11, 1998. It peaked at the 25th position on the Oricon Singles Chart.

== Track listing ==
No.	Title	Lyrics	Music	Length
1.	"Sasayaki" (囁き)	Atsushi Sakurai	Hisashi Imai	4:28
2.	"Thanatos -the japanic pig mix-"	Atsushi Sakurai	Raymond Watts	8:28
3.	"MY FUCKIN' VALENTINE -enemy mix (full)"		Hisashi Imai (remix)	4:41
4.	"Schiz・o幻想 -the spiderman mix-"	Atsushi Sakurai	Daniel Ash	4:23

== Musicians ==
- Atsushi Sakurai - Voice
- Hisashi Imai - Guitar
- Hidehiko Hoshino - Guitar
- Yutaka Higuchi - Bass
- Toll Yagami - Drums
- Kazutoshi Yokoyama - keyboard
- Steve White - Rhythm Programming (# 2)
- Carol Ann Reynolds - chorus (# 2)
- Günter Schulz - programming, guitar (# 3)
- Daniel Ash - voice, guitar, percussion, effects (# 4)
- Wal Paul Fish - keyboard (# 4)
