= Gold Sun and Silver Moon =

- Standard edition cover

Studio album by Shazna
- Released: January 22, 1998 (limited edition); January 31, 1998 (standard edition)
- Length: 59:11
- Language: Japanese
- Label: Ariola Japan

Shazna chronology
Promise Eve (1997)	Gold Sun and Silver Moon (1998)	Pure Hearts (1999)

Gold Sun and Silver Moon is a studio album by the Japanese band Shazna, released in January 1998, by BMG Japan, their first album on a major label. The album includes four singles, including the hits "Melty Love" and "Sumire September Love". The promotional tour, titled "Shazna Tour '98 Moonlight Dream –Mid Summer Night Dream–", began on August 4 in Hokkaido and concluded on September 4 at the Nippon Budokan.

The album was released in two editions. The limited edition was released on January 22, 1998, remastered in Los Angeles and includes two discs, as well as a music box 8 cm CD. The standard edition was released nine days later, on January 31, remastered in Tokyo and contains the bonus track "Das Spiel".

== Commercial performance ==
Gold Sun and Silver Moon was named Rock Album of the Year in 1999 by the Japan Gold Disc Awards. A 2004 issue of the music magazine Band Yarouze named it one of the best albums of 1989–1998.

It was the 42nd best-selling album in Japan in 1998, with 603,130 copies sold that year, being certified million and later triple platinum by RIAJ.

On the Oricon Albums Chart, the limited edition reached second position, while the standard edition reached third.

=== Reception ===
CD Journal was negative on its review. The magazine said that the cover appeared to be a copy of a Kazuhiko Katō album and described the music as "weak".

== Track listing ==
All lyrics are written by Izam.

No.	Title	Length
1.	"White Fairytale"	5:12
2.	"Lilly of the Valley"	5:08
3.	"Sweet Angel"	3:52
4.	"Aurora"	4:48
5.	"Sweet Heart Memory"	4:49
6.	"Secret Love"	5:04
7.	"Magenta Story"	4:34
8.	"Melty Love"	5:33
9.	"Romance"	5:55
10.	"Sumire September Love" (すみれ September Love, Ippu-Do cover)	6:00
11.	"Refrain of Dreams"	4:41
12.	"Das Spiel"	3:30
Total length:		59:11

== Personnel ==
- Izam – vocals
- A・O・I – guitar
- Niy – bass
