= Marble (album) =

EP by Fanatic Crisis
- Released: November 25, 1996
- Genres: Post-punk; pop rock
- Length: 24:49
- Label: Noir

Fanatic Crisis chronology
Mask (1996)	Marble (1996)	One -one for all- (1998)

Marble is the second EP by Japanese rock band Fanatic Crisis. It was released by the independent label Noir on November 25, 1996. The first edition was housed in a plastic sleeve containing a box showing fake prescription pills which say, "Now, you must look for some more stimulants." It was re-released on May 19, 1999, alongside other Fanatic Crisis's indies albums, and that edition reached number 47 on Oricon Albums Chart.

== Track listing ==
All lyrics are written by Tsutomu Ishizuki.

No.	Title	Music	Length
1.	"Intro"	−
2.	"Marble"	Shun
3.	"Egoism"	Kazuya
4.	"Psychedelic Paradox"	Kazuya
5.	"More Pain"	Ryuji
6.	"Eien no Kodomotachi -The Eternal Child-" (永遠の子供達 -the eternal child-)	Tsutomu Ishizuki
7.	"My Rose"	Tsutomu Ishizuki

== Personnel ==
- Tsutomu Ishizuki − vocals
- Kazuya − lead guitar
- Shun − rhythm guitar
- Ryuji − bass
