= Neverland (Fanatic Crisis album) =

Studio album by Fanatic Crisis
- Released: July 2, 2003
- Genre: Rock
- Length: 43:23
- Language: Japanese
- Label: Stoic Stone

Fanatic Crisis chronology
5 (2002)	Neverland (2003)	Marvelous+ (2004)

Neverland is the eighth studio album by the Japanese band Fanatic Crisis, released on July 2, 2003, by Stoic Stone label.

The singles from the album are “Blue Rose”, “Yumejanai sekai”, and “Moonlight”. The latter was used as ending theme song for the television program Miyake Yūji no Doshirōto. In 2019, three members of Fanatic Crisis reunited as Fantastic Circus and re-recorded the singles in 2024, releasing them on the album TENSEISM BEST SINGLES [2001-2004].

== Reception and commercial performance ==
Neverland reached No. 32 on the Oricon Albums Chart, where it remained for two weeks. It sold approximately 13,451 copies while on chart. It reached No. 3 on Tower Records' Japanese rock and pop album chart. The singles “Blue Rose”, “Yumejanai Sekai”, and “Moonlight”, reached No. 28, No. 15, and No. 20 on the Oricon chart, respectively.

In its review of the album, the music magazine CD Journal praised the band's consistency, their commitment to promoting their music, and their creative drive.

== Track listing ==
All lyrics are written by Tsutomu Ishizuki.

No.	Title	Length
1.	"everland (instrumental)"	0:52
2.	"Yumejanai sekai." (夢じゃない世界。)	4:34
3.	"Rolling stoned"	3:01
4.	"moonlight"	4:18
5.	"Shiva" (シヴァ)	4:09
6.	"Chikatetsu no Melody" (地下鉄のメロディー)	3:03
7.	"“NEVER LAND”"	4:08
8.	"MADE IN BLUE"	3:54
9.	"Fairy land (instrumental)"	1:32
10.	"Blue Rose"	4:51
11.	"Sayonara Mermaid" (さよならMERMAID)	2:07
12.	"Saisei no Asa" (再生の朝)	4:06
13.	"Ryūsei-Gun" (流星群)	4:03
Total length:		43:23

== Personnel ==
- Tsutomu Ishizuki − vocals
- Kazuya − lead guitar
- Shun − rhythm guitar
- Ryuji − bass
- Tohru − drums
