= La'cryma Christi =

Japanese visual kei rock band

- Also known as: Strippe-D Lady (1991–1994)
- Origin: Osaka, Japan
- Genres: Hard rock; pop rock; progressive rock
- Years active: 1991–2007; 2009–2010; 2012–2013; 2025–present
- Labels: Toy's Factory; Polydor; Universal; Majestic Ring
- Members: Taka; Hiro; Levin; Shuse
- Past members: Sima-chan; Kita-J; Koji
- Website: www.lacrymachristi.jp

La'cryma Christi (Latin for "Tears of Christ") is a Japanese visual kei rock band, formed in Osaka in 1991. After changing their name from Strippe-D Lady, the classic lineup of vocalist Taka, guitarists Hiro and Koji, drummer Levin and bassist Shuse lasted from 1994 until 2005. Following Koji's departure that year, the band continued for two more years before disbanding in January 2007. At their peak in the mid-to-late 1990s, they were considered one of the "Four Heavenly Kings of visual kei" alongside Malice Mizer, Fanatic Crisis and Shazna. La'cryma Christi's music is largely hard rock and progressive rock, but they achieved popularity through accessible pop songs. The five members reunited for a festival performance in 2009, a short reunion tour in 2010, and a 15th anniversary tour in 2012 and 2013. Koji died from cancer in 2022, and the four surviving members reunited in November 2025.

== History ==
=== 1991–2007: Formation and career ===
Strippe-D Lady was formed in Osaka in February 1991 by vocalist and leader Taka with his college friend and neighbor Hiro. The two held a small audition in Kansai to find new talent for the band. They recruited bassist Kita-J and drummer Sima-chan, although Sima-chan was later replaced by Levin. In the fall of 1993, Levin invited his high school friend, Koji, to join the band as second guitarist. Strippe-D Lady released a couple of demo tapes and contributed "Stay Close Tonight" to the 1993 Vintage Present compilation album, before changing their name in 1994. They chose La'cryma Christi after Taka browsed an Italian dictionary. Meaning "Tears of Christ", the singer said it was chosen as they wanted to express the color of Christ's tears, which no one has ever seen, through their staging and music. They released their first single, "Siam's Eye", on a local independent record label in October 1994, with all 1,000 copies sold out. However, Kita-J decided to leave the band and was replaced on bass by Shuse that same month, finalizing the classic lineup. Taka later said that their original sound leaned towards Kita-J's interests, but following his departure they shifted to Hiro's preferences. "Siam's Eye" received a second press in 1995, which also sold out. For the third press, the band re-recorded the vocals, remixed the songs, and added a third song. La'cryma Christi also contributed to the Cry-Max Pleasure Super and Cosmic Fields compilation albums in 1995. They released their first mini-album in February 1996, Warm Snow, which sold all 15,000 copies, and the band moved to Tokyo shortly after. The five songs on Warm Snow were re-recorded and released as the mini-album Dwellers of a Sandcastle five months later. The Home Sick Child tour ran from July to September, and was followed in December by the Child of the Holy tour.

In 1997, the band released the single "Forest" in March, which was used as the theme song for the live-action television adaptation of Weather Woman. La'cryma Christi then signed with Polydor Records and made their major label debut with "Ivory Trees" in May. August saw the Breath of Limelight tour take the band to twelve locations. Their first full-length album, Sculpture of Time, reached number No. 8 on the Oricon Albums Chart when it was released in November. 1998 saw the formation of La'cryma Christi's official fan club, Simpatia. They performed at Dokidoki Break Sengen! '98 on January 10 at Nissin Power Station, which celebrated the 12th anniversary of Be-Pass magazine and also featured Siam Shade. Their second album, Lhasa, also reached No. 8 when it was released that November. It was certified Platinum by the RIAJ for sales over 400,000, making it the band's best-selling album. Its single "Mirai Kōro" was used as the ending theme of the Nightwalker: The Midnight Detective anime, reached No. 3 on the Oricon Singles Chart, and was certified Gold for sales over 200,000. The Lhasa tour, which featured 17 shows in 16 locations, began in December. An "encore" of five additional shows was performed in March 1999. The Angolmois tour began in July, and was followed in August by the single "Eien". The song was used in the TV drama Tengoku no Kiss, which Taka had an acting role in.

March 2000 saw the release of the album Magic Theatre and the beginning of the lengthy Boescape tour. The band's first compilation album, Single Collection, was released in June and they held their first international show in South Korea in August. The February 2001 single "Jōnetsu no Kaze" was used as the theme song for the television show Kyoto Meikyū Annai. The band's fourth studio album, &.U, was released in March 2002. In 2003, La'cryma Christi founded their own record label, Majestic Ring. That November saw the release of their album Deep Space Syndicate and a tribute album to Loudness, which the band contributed a cover to. As part of their 10th anniversary celebrations, the band released the single "Hot Rod Circuit" in August and the greatest hits album Greatest-Hits in September. They were also scheduled to hold three anniversary concerts at Nakano Sun Plaza in October, but due to a mistake by the promoter, the venue could not be booked. Instead, the concerts were rescheduled for the Tokyo Koseinenkin Hall in November.

Koji left the band after their Zepp Tokyo gig on March 21, 2005. Continuing as a quartet, they released their eighth album Zeus on May 25 of that same year. The band's final album, Where the Earth is Rotting Away, was released on September 27, 2006. That same month, La'cryma Christi announced that they would officially disband in January 2007. They explained that each member had differing opinions after discussing their future music and activities. The Where the Earth is Rotting Away tour ran from November 2 to December 5, and the band performed their last concert at Zepp Tokyo on January 20, 2007.

=== Post-La'cryma Christi activities and temporary reunions ===
Koji released two solo albums and formed ALvino in 2006 with Pierrot guitarist Jun and Nioi vocalist Shota. When they went on hiatus in 2018, he formed the duo Alice in Menswear with Maschera vocalist Michi. Taka and Hiro formed the band Libraian in 2007. Hiro has released two solo albums, one of which features him singing lead vocals, and has worked as a support guitarist for acts such as Creature Creature and Acid Black Cherry, playing alongside Shuse in the latter. Levin formed the band The Husky with Whiteberry vocalist Yuki Maeda in 2007, and has provided support for many acts, including ALvino, Kirito and Toshi with T-Earth. Shuse formed the band Samurai Dead City in 2007, before leaving them in 2009. He later explained it was never a serious project for him, as he had formed it with former classmates who were amateur musicians. In 2010, Shuse formed †яi¢к with Moon Child drummer Kei Kashiyama, Lucifer vocalist Makoto Koshinaka and former The Dead Pop Stars guitarist Taiji Fujimoto. Kei was replaced by Vidoll drummer Tero the following year. Shuse was also a member of 44Magnum for a few years, with whom he released one album.

La'cryma Christi, including Koji, reunited for one night at the V-Rock Festival, which took place at Makuhari Messe on October 21, 2009. There they announced their reunion tour, La'cryma Christi Resurrection ~Final Prayer~, which started on January 12, 2010 and ended on February 1.

In 2012, La'cryma Christi performed a 15th anniversary tour from May 8 to July 29. At the final show, another concert was announced for September 30 at Shibuya-AX. Two additional anniversary concerts were held the following year; Shibuya-AX on May 5 and Akasaka Blitz on June 8.

In July 2020, rhythm guitarist Koji announced he was diagnosed with esophageal cancer. Although he returned to performing in spring 2021, he died from the cancer on April 15, 2022, at the age of 49. On May 8, 2025, it was announced that the four surviving members would be reuniting La'cryma Christi for a limited time. Taka, who had retired from music following their previous reunion 12 years earlier, said Koji visited him in his dreams and told him to sing if he could and make people happy. He was then contacted by Hiro who asked if he wanted to appear at two memorial lives for Koji in April 2024, titled Koji & Hiro Joint Live 2024. The concerts also featured Koji's son, Kazuki, who started playing guitar after his father's death. After singing two songs at the events unannounced, Taka said he was overwhelmed with the desire to sing and contacted the other members of the band.

La'cryma Christi's discography was made available for download and streaming on most digital music services on October 3, 2025, with the exception of "Siam's Eye" and Warm Snow. La'cryma Christi headlined both nights of the Cross Road Fest, which took place at the Makuhari Event Hall on November 15 and 16. With one of Koji's guitars displayed on stage, Creature Creature guitarist Shinobu joined them as a support musician. Their first tour in 12 years, Night Flight ~Final Call~, was held between December 24 and January 14, 2026. Due to demand, additional dates were added for between March 14 and May 9, under the title Night Flight ~Last Finale~. La'cryma Christi also performed at a memorial concert for Koji at Toyosu Pit on April 12, where they unveiled their first new song in 20 years; "Shinkirō" (蜃気楼). Titled Koji Memorial & Birthday Live 2026 ~Eternal Blue~, the concert also featured Koji's two other bands, ALvino and Alice in Menswear. To commemorate their 30th anniversary, La'cryma Christi will perform a concert at SGC Hall Ariake on May 8, 2027.

== Musical style ==
Music news website Barks described La'cryma Christi as having a hard rock sound, but noted that they achieved popularity through accessible pop songs. Hiroko Yamamoto of OK Music called them a progressive rock band with "complex yet melodic songs" that blend Western rock with elements of Eastern oriental music. Despite the progressive elements of their music, no member of the band listened to the genre. Levin suggested it just happened naturally as they always tried to create unique arrangements. Hiro later opined that it was because Koji and himself were polar opposites that they were able to create innovative guitar arrangements. A signature part of their sound is Taka's high-pitched vocals, which Yamamoto feels brings out pop melodies. Taka explained his singing style developed naturally before the band formed as he was trying to be heard over Hiro's guitar.

Music writer Takuya Ito wrote that La'cryma Christi had already established their unique sound by the time of 1996's Dwellers of a Sandcastle. Discussing their first full-length album, Sculpture of Time, he wrote that most of the songs have incredibly complex structures, which is hard to believe given the singles, and cited "Henseifū" as the song that best represents the band. Lhasa, the group's best-selling album, is separated into two sides; "Yours", composed of pop songs, and "Ours", which features more technical and complex tracks. Ito described its follow-up, Magic Theatre, as featuring a wide variety of different styles, including their signature oriental atmosphere, sad love songs, light-hearted country-style songs, and dark, serious, fast-paced tracks. For Zeus, their first album without Koji, visual kei journalist Akemi Oshima wrote that La'cryma Christi dropped most of their progressive elements in favor of a classic hard rock sound focused on guitar riffs.

Hiro cited Dead End as one of his favorite bands, while Koji named Van Halen as his favorite. Koji said he had admired guitarists such as Steve Vai and Joe Satriani ever since he started playing the instrument. Levin was influenced by John Bonham, and said he would blatantly incorporate Bonham's drum phrases in the band's early days. According to Taka, Levin was a fan of Dream Theater. Shuse listed Mötley Crüe, Ozzy Osbourne, U2, Duran Duran, Foo Fighters, Linkin Park, 44 Magnum, Dead End, The Beatles, Jellyfish and Kiss as his favorite bands.

== Influence ==
At their peak in the mid-to-late 1990s, La'cryma Christi were considered one of the "Four Heavenly Kings of visual kei" alongside Malice Mizer, Fanatic Crisis and Shazna. Barks wrote that they occupied a unique position in the visual kei boom of the 1990s that was established by the high technical ability of their individual members and their meticulous ensemble work. In 1995, Taka said that they wore makeup and outfits to entertain the audience as part of the show, "but what we absolutely prioritize is the sound, and we think of makeup as just an accessory". In 2004, Dwellers of a Sandcastle was named one of the top albums from 1989 to 1998 by the music magazine Band Yarouze. In 2016, Yamamoto wrote that Sculpture of Time "shocked the world" and called it a masterpiece that deserves to be passed down for generations to come.

Nogod vocalist Dancho cited La'cryma Christi as an influence, explaining that they were the band that made him realize "strong technical ability, great songs and a distinct worldview" are the three necessary components to truly be visual kei. Nightmare vocalist Yomi and guitarist Hitsugi both covered their songs in their high school days. Leetspeak Monsters guitarist Yo'shmeer is also a fan of La'cryma Christi, particularly mentioning how he likes that their songs are uplifting. La'cryma Christi's song "With-you" was covered by Daizystripper on the compilation Crush! -90's V-Rock Best Hit Cover Songs-, which was released on January 26, 2011 and features current visual kei bands covering songs from bands that were important to the '90s visual kei movement. "Mirai Kōro" was covered by Blu-Billion on its sequel, Crush! 2 -90's V-Rock Best Hit Cover Songs-, which was released on November 23, 2011.

== Members ==
Current members

- Taka – lead vocals (1991–2007, 2009–2010, 2012–2013, 2025–present)
- Hiro – lead guitar, backing vocals (1991–2007, 2009–2010, 2012–2013, 2025–present)
- Levin – drums (1992–2007, 2009–2010, 2012–2013, 2025–present)
- Shuse – bass, backing vocals (1994–2007, 2009–2010, 2012–2013, 2025–present)

Former members

- Sima-chan – drums (1991–1992)
- Kita-J – bass (1991–1994)
- Koji – rhythm guitar (1993–2005, 2009–2010, 2012–2013; died 2022)

== Discography ==
=== Mini-albums ===
- Warm Snow (February 4, 1996)
- Dwellers of a Sandcastle (July 22, 1996), Oricon Albums Chart Peak Position: No. 71

=== Studio albums ===
- Sculpture of Time (November 12, 1997) No. 8
- Lhasa (November 25, 1998) No. 8
- Magic Theatre (March 15, 2000) No. 22
- &.U (March 6, 2002) No. 36
- Deep Space Syndicate (November 5, 2003) No. 42
- Zeus (May 25, 2005) No. 59
- Where the Earth is Rotting Away (September 27, 2006) No. 79

=== Singles ===
- "Siam's Eye" (October 7, 1994)
- "Forest" (March 13, 1997), Oricon Singles Chart Peak Position: No. 50
- "Ivory Trees" (May 8, 1997) No. 22
- "The Scent" (July 30, 1997) No. 23
- "Nangoku" (南国; October 29, 1997) No. 25
- "With-you" (May 8, 1998) No. 10
- "Mirai Kōro" (未来航路; August 26, 1998) No. 3
- "In Forest" (November 11, 1998) No. 8
- "Without You" (May 26, 1999) No. 8
- "Eien" (永遠; August 25, 1999) No. 9
- "Lime Rain" (January 19, 2000) No. 15
- "Life" (November 22, 2000) No. 27
- "Jump!!" (October 24, 2001) No. 27
- "Jōnetsu no Kaze" (情熱の風; February 6, 2002) No. 26
- "Hirameki" (December 4, 2002) No. 26
- "Mystical Glider" (March 26, 2003)
- "Groove Weapon" (July 30, 2003) No. 44
- "Cannonball" (April 21, 2004) No. 50
- "Hot Rod Circuit" (August 11, 2004) No. 65
- "Yesterdays" (March 23, 2005) No. 40
- "Sweet Lil' Devil" (June 6, 2006)
- "Breaking" (August 23, 2006) No. 108

=== Demo tapes ===
- "Stay Close Tonight" (October 9, 1993)
- "Stripped-D Lady" (January 1994)

=== Compilation albums ===
- Single Collection (June 28, 2000) No. 9
- Greatest-Hits (September 8, 2004) No. 66
- Sound & Vision The Singles + Selection from Live "Decade" (June 28, 2006) No. 240
- La'cryma Christi Singles + Clips (January 1, 2010, CD and DVD)

=== Live albums ===
- The 10th Anniversary Live "Decade" 1st Day (October 7, 2009)
- The 10th Anniversary Live "Decade" 2nd Day (October 7, 2009)
- The 10th Anniversary Live "Decade" 3rd Day (October 7, 2009)
- Mirai Kōro - La'cryma Christi at Tokyo International Forum 1998.8.28 (October 7, 2009)
- Live at Lhasa 1999.3.31 Nippon Budokan (October 7, 2009)
- Tour Angolmois at Yokohama Arena 1999.9.4 (October 7, 2009)
- Resurrection -The CD Box- (April 21, 2010, 10 CD box set)
  - 2009.10.24 V-Rock Festival'09 at Makuhari Messe (1 CD)
  - 2010.1.18 Final Prayer at Zepp Tokyo (2 CD)
  - 2010.1.19 Final Prayer at Zepp Tokyo (2 CD)
  - 2010.2.13 The Final at Shibuya C.C.Lemon Hall (2 CD)
  - 2010.2.14 The Final at Shibuya C.C.Lemon Hall (3 CD)
- 15th Anniversary Live: History of La'cryma Christi Vol. 1 - 2013.5.5 Shibuya-AX (October 6, 2017)
- 15th Anniversary Live: History of La'cryma Christi Vol. 2 - 2013.6.8 Akasaka Blitz (October 6, 2017)

=== Various artists compilations ===
- 1993 Vintage Present (1993, "Stay Close Tonight")
- Cry-Max Pleasure Super ~Loud, Trance and Violence for Extacy~ (1995, "Hibiwareta Kagami ni Utsutta Watashi o Koroshita Ato...")
- Cosmic Fields (1995, "White Period.")
- Shock Wave '96 (1996, "Siam's Eye")
- A Tribute to Loudness (2003, "Crazy Doctor")

=== Home videos ===
- Glass Castle (March 1997)
- 4U (February 11, 1998)
- Zero (December 24, 1998)
- Live at Lhasa (June 30, 1999)
- True Color (December 22, 1999)
- 4U・True Color (May 31, 2000)
- Six Visions (June 30, 2004), Oricon DVDs Chart Peak Position: No. 65
- The 10th Anniversary Live "Decade" (March 31, 2005)
- Memories 1 (January 20, 2007, 4 DVD box set)
  - Live Mirai Kōro 1998.8.28
  - Live at Lhasa 1999.3.31
  - Live Tour Angolmois 1999.9.4
  - Clips
- Last Live "White Period" (August 8, 2007)
- The 10th Anniversary Live "Decade" 1st Day (October 7, 2009)
- The 10th Anniversary Live "Decade" 2nd Day (October 7, 2009)
- The 10th Anniversary Live "Decade" 3rd Day (October 7, 2009)
- Mirai Kōro - La'cryma Christi at Tokyo International Forum 1998.8.28 (October 7, 2009)
- Live at Lhasa 1999.3.31 Nippon Budokan (October 7, 2009)
- Tour Angolmois at Yokohama Arena 1999.9.4 (October 7, 2009)
- Resurrection -The DVD Box- (April 21, 2010, 5 DVD box set)
  - 2009.10.24 V-Rock Festival'09 at Makuhari Messe (1 DVD)
  - 2010.1.19 Final Prayer at Zepp Tokyo (2 DVD)
  - 2010.2.14 The Final at Shibuya C.C.Lemon Hall (2 DVD)
- 15th Anniversary Live -Special Box- (March 20, 2013, 16 DVD/8 Blu-ray and 16 CD box set)
- La'cryma Christi Live Tour 2025–2026 Night Flight ~Final Call~ at Line Cube Shibuya 20260114 (May 2026)
- La'cryma Christi Live Tour 2026 Night Flight ~Last Finale~ Collection (December 2026)
- La'cryma Christi Live Tour 2026 Night Flight ~Last Finale~ at Line Cube Shibuya 20260314 (December 2026)
- La'cryma Christi Live Tour 2026 Night Flight ~Last Finale~ at Line Cube Shibuya 20260315 (January 2027)
- La'cryma Christi Live Tour 2026 Night Flight ~Last Finale~ at Zepp Namba (Osaka) 20260509 (February 2027)
