= Heroin (Buck-Tick song) =

1997 Japanese rock song

Single by Buck-Tick

from the album Sexy Stream Liner
- Released: November 12, 1997
- Recorded: July – September 1997
- Genre: Rock
- Length: 9:06
- Label: Mercury Records
- Songwriter(s): Atsushi Sakurai, Hisashi Imai
- Producer(s): Buck-Tick

Buck-Tick singles chronology
"Candy" (1996)	"Heroin" (1997)	"Sasayaki" (1998)

"Heroin" is the thirteenth single by the Japanese rock band Buck-Tick, released on November 12, 1997.

== Track listing ==
#	Title	Length	Lyrics	Music
1	"Heroin"	4:21	Atsushi Sakurai	Hisashi Imai
2	"Rasenchuu (螺旋 虫) -tapeworm mix-"	3:28	Atsushi Sakurai	Hidehiko Hoshino

== Personnel ==
- Atsushi Sakurai – vocals
- Hisashi Imai – guitar
- Hidehiko Hoshino – guitar
- Yutaka Higuchi – bass
- Toll Yagami – drums
