= Taiyou no Toriko =

- 1995 edition cover

EP by Fanatic Crisis
- Released: December 1, 1994; April 28, 1995
- Studio: Mutec Studio, Alfa A
- Genre: Gothic rock; post-punk
- Length: 25:58 (1994 version); 33:02 (1995 version)
- Language: Japanese
- Label: Noir
- Producer: Fanatic Crisis and Kaiki

Fanatic Crisis chronology
Taiyou no Toriko (1994)	Mask (1996)

Taiyou no Toriko (太陽の虜, Taiyō no Toriko; lit. Prisoner of the Sun) is the debut EP by Japanese rock band Fanatic Crisis. This album has two editions. The first edition features six tracks and was released by the independent label Noir on December 1, 1994. The second edition features three additional tracks (one new song, an instrumental interlude, and a remixed version of Pacifist) and was released on April 28, 1995.

== Production ==
The album was produced by Fanatic Crisis and Kaiki, bassist of Rouage and owner of the Noir label, while Mr. Sasaki handled the engineering. It was recorded at Mutec Studio and mastered at Alfa A. The photography was done by Maki Fujiwara. Vocalists Kazushi (Rouage) and Kohey (Sleep my Dear) contributed to the backing vocals.

== Musicality and legacy ==
The album’s musical style follows the Nagoya kei subgenre, characterized by a dark and melancholic aesthetic, a dense atmosphere, and fast-paced rhythms. This theme is embodied in the first track "Kuroi Taiyo" (黒い太陽). Rock and Read magazine stated: "Taiyō no Toriko remains not only in the memory of Nagoya kei, but of visual kei as a hidden masterpiece."

A proeminent feature of the album is the use of synthesizers and the incorporation of a pop music sense by lead singer Tsutomu Ishizuki. The website Grumble Monster noted, however, that there is stylistic variety beyond the gothic and pop influences, such as hints of jazz in "Flowers For...", waltz in "Sleepless Merry-Go-Round", as well as the incorporation of industrial, techno, and eurobeat elements in "Pacifist" and its remixed version.

== Track listing ==
All lyrics are written by Tsutomu Ishizuki.

1994 edition
No.	Title	Music	Length
1.	"World's E.N.D."	Tatsuya
2.	"Pacifist"	Kazuya
3.	"Flowers for..."	Shun
4.	"P.E.R.S.O.N.A."	Shun
5.	"Kuroi Taiyou (黒い太陽; Remake Version)"	Kazuya
6.	"Sleepless Merry-Go-Round"	Shun

1995 edition
No.	Title	Music	Length
1.	"Kuroi Taiyou (黒い太陽; Remake Version)"	Kazuya
2.	"P.E.R.S.O.N.A."	Shun
3.	"Pacifist"	Kazuya
4.	"Flowers for..."	Shun
5.	"Sleepless Merry-Go-Round"	Shun
6.	"Disappear'n (intro)"	Ryuji
7.	"Disappear'n"	Ryuji
8.	"World's E.N.D"	Tatsuya
9.	"Pacifist (GM Extended Mix)"	Kazuya

== Personnel ==
- Tsutomu Ishizuki − vocals
- Kazuya − lead guitar
- Shun − rhythm guitar
- Ryuji − bass
- Tatsuya − drums
