= Pop (Fanatic Crisis album) =

Studio album by Fanatic Crisis
- Released: June 27, 2001
- Genre: Rock
- Length: 62:56
- Language: Japanese
- Label: Stoic Stone

Fanatic Crisis chronology
EAS (2000)	Pop (2001)	Beautiful World (2001)

Pop is the fifth studio album by the Japanese rock band Fanatic Crisis, released on June 27, 2001, by Stoic Stone.

The album's singles are "Life", "Hal" (theme song for the drama Ai wa Seigi), "Jet Hyp!" (theme song for television program Guru Guru Ninety Nine), and "Yuragi". The last song, "Subete no Tomo no Tame ni Kitto Asuhakurukara," is a bonus track included only on the first edition.

In 2019, three members of Fanatic Crisis reunited and re-recorded the singles of the album in 2024, releasing them on the compilation TENSEISM BEST SINGLES [2001-2004].

== Commercial performance ==
Pop reached No. 19 on the Oricon Albums Chart, remaining on chart for two weeks. It sold approximately 19,200 copies while it was on the chart.

The singles "Life", "Hal", "Jet hyp!", and "Yuragi" reached 30th, 28th, 22nd, and 27th place on the Oricon Singles Chart, respectively.

== Track listing ==
All music is composed by Tsutomu Ishizuki, except when noted, and all arrangements by Yoshihiro Kambayashi.

No.	Title	Music	Length
1.	"JET hyp!"	Kazuya and Ishizuki	3:55
2.	"Wonderful Life" (ワンダフルライフ)		3:53
3.	"Hal" (hal [ハル])		4:19
4.	"Maria C."		5:19
5.	"Taion o Koete" (体温をこえて)		5:07
6.	"summer emotion"		4:16
7.	"tender is..."		4:19
8.	"if."		4:46
9.	"P.O.P"	Fanatic Crisis	2:19
10.	"LOOP"		4:17
11.	"Jinsei Game" (人生ゲーム)		3:57
12.	"Yuragi" (ゆらぎ)		5:16
13.	"LIFE"		3:42
14.	"CRASH IN THE DAYS"		5:00
Total length:			60:24

Bonus track of the first edition

No.	Title	Music	Length
15.	"Subete no Tomo no Tame ni Kitto Asuhakurukara." (すべての友のためにきっと明日は来るから。)	Fanatic Crisis	2:32
Total length:			62:56

== Personnel ==
- Tsutomu Ishizuki − vocals
- Kazuya − lead guitar
- Shun − rhythm guitar
- Ryuji − bass
- Tohru − drums
