= Hinotori (song) =

Single by Fanatic Crisis

from the album The.Lost.Innocent
- Language: Japanese
- B-side: "Blue Earth -Hanasaku Okade-"
- Released: July 1, 1998
- Length: 15:27
- Label: For Life Records
- Composers: Tsutomu Ishizuki and Kazuya

Fanatic Crisis singles chronology
"Rainy merry-go-round" (1998)	"Hinotori" (1998)	"Maybe true" (1998)

"Hinotori" (火の鳥) is the ninth single by Japanese rock band Fanatic Crisis, released on July 1, 1998, by For Life Records. The song was ending theme for the television program Guruguru Ninety Nine. It is considered the band's most famous and representative song.

It was included on the studio album The.Lost.Innocent and on the greatest hits compilation The Best of Fanatic◇Crisis Single Collection 01, released prior to the band's breakup in 2005. In 2023, three members of Fanatic Crisis reunited and re-recorded the song, releasing it on the album Tenseism.

The song was composed by Tsutomu Ishizuki and guitarist Kazuya. CD Journal praised Ishizuki's vocals and commented that the sound "becomes more melodic during the chorus, rising with a repetitive, flowing rhythm."

== Commercial performance ==
It reached tenth place on Oricon Singles Chart and remained on chart for eleven weeks. It was the first top 10 single of the band on the chart. Debuted at number eight on Billboard Japan.

It sold 136,880 copies while on the Oricon charts, becoming the band's best-selling single.

== Track listing ==
All lyrics are written by Tsutomu Ishizuki.

No.	Title	Music	Length
1.	"Hinotori" (火の鳥)	Tsutomu Ishizuki and Kazuya	4:28
2.	"Blue Earth -Hanasaku Okade-" (Blue Earth -花咲く丘で-)	Tsutomu Ishizuki and Shun	6:32
3.	"Hinotori (Vox Less Version)"		4:28
Total length:			15:27

== Personnel ==
- Tsutomu Ishizuki − vocals
- Kazuya − lead guitar
- Shun − rhythm guitar
- Ryuji − bass
- Tohru − drums
