= 5 (Fanatic Crisis album) =

Studio album by Fanatic Crisis
- Released: July 10, 2002
- Genre: Rock
- Length: 48:15
- Language: Japanese
- Label: Stoic Stone

Fanatic Crisis chronology
Beautiful World (2001)	5 (2002)	Neverland (2003)

5 is the seventh studio album by Japanese band Fanatic Crisis, released on July 10, 2002, by Stoic Stone. The album title has two meanings. Excluding the independent album Mask, this is Fanatic Crisis's fifth studio album. Secondly, it marks five years since their debut on a major label.

The singles of the album are "Down Code" which was theme song for television program AX Music Factory; "Sputnik -Tabibitotachi-", theme song for television program Dotchi no Ryōri Shō; "Love Monster", ending theme for the tokusatsu series Maskman; and "Dorakila". In 2019, three members of Fanatic Crisis reunited as Fantastic Circus and re-recorded the singles in 2024, releasing them on the album TENSEISM BEST SINGLES [2001-2004].

== Reception and commercial performance ==
5 reached No. 24 on the Oricon Albums Chart, where it remained for two weeks. It sold approximately 16,090 copies while on the chart. "Down Code", "Sputnik -Tabibitotachi-", "Love Monster" and "Dorakila" reached No. 10, No. 25, No. 15, and No. 10 on the Oricon chart, respectively.

Music magazine CD Journal noted that the album incorporates a wide variety of musical styles, showcasing a musicality that breaks the mold. They concluded with "the band's unique dynamism is evident in every song."

== Track listing ==
All music is composed by Tsutomu Ishizuki, except when noted, and all arrangement by Yoshihiro Kambayashi.

No.	Title	Music	Length
1.	"movable-pleasure-ground from galaxy"		1:41
2.	"Shin Sekai" (シンセカイ)		3:45
3.	"Dorakila" (ドラキラ)		4:00
4.	"Rock'n Roll is dead?"	Fanatic Crisis	3:17
5.	"Dragon sphere"		4:34
6.	"Sputnik -Tabibitotachi-" (スプートニク -旅人たち-)		4:10
7.	"Japanesque"		4:32
8.	"Love Monster"		3:56
9.	"Rainy day"		2:15
10.	"again"		4:01
11.	"Down Code" (ダウンコード)		4:11
12.	"Exit"	Fanatic Crisis	3:55
13.	"Kogane no Tsuki" (黄金の月)		4:15
Total length:			48:15

== Personnel ==
- Tsutomu Ishizuki − vocals
- Kazuya − lead guitar
- Shun − rhythm guitar
- Ryuji − bass
- Tohru − drums
