= Gessekai =

Single by Buck-Tick
- Released: May 13, 1998
- Recorded: 1997
- Genre: Rock
- Length: 16:06
- Label: Mercury Records
- Songwriters: Atsushi Sakurai, Hisashi Imai

Buck-Tick singles chronology
"Sasayaki" (1998)	"Gessekai" (1998)	"Bran-New Lover" (1999)

"Gessekai" (月世界) (English: Moon World) is the fifteenth single released by the Japanese rock band Buck-Tick, released on May 13, 1998. The song "Gessekai" was used as opening theme of the anime Nightwalker: The Midnight Detective. Track three is a remix of "Muchi no Namida" from Sexy Stream Liner done by Tomoyasu Hotei.

== Track listing ==
No.	Title	Lyrics	Music	Length
1.	"Gessekai"	Atsushi Sakurai	Hisashi Imai	5:06
2.	"My Baby Japanese"	Atsushi Sakurai	Hidehiko Hoshino	4:32
3.	"Muchi no Namida (HOT remix #001 for B-T)"	Atsushi Sakurai	Hisashi Imai	6:28

== Personnel ==
- Atsushi Sakurai - voice
- Hisashi Imai - guitar, voice
- Hidehiko Hoshino - guitar
- Yutaka Higuchi - bass
- Toll Yagami - drums
- Kazutoshi Yokoyama - keyboard
