= Joran: The Princess of Snow and Blood =

Japanese anime television series

- 擾乱 THE PRINCESS OF SNOW AND BLOOD
- Developed by: Rika Nezu
- Directed by: Susumu Kudou
- Voices of: Suzuko Mimori; Raychell; Shouta Aoi; Ayasa Itō; Chikahiro Kobayashi
- Music by: Michiru
- Country of origin: Japan
- Original language: Japanese
- No. of episodes: 12

Production
- Producers: Hiroyasu Oyama; Hiroyuki Inage; Nobuhiro Ogawa; Masahiro Katou; Rurio Kikuchi; Yuuko Nakao
- Animator: Bakken Record
- Production companies: Nippon Television; HJ Holdings; Bushiroad Music; Bushiroad Move; Dentsu; Tatsunoko Production

Original release
- Network: Nippon TV, BS NTV, NTV+
- Release: April 7 – June 23, 2021

Joran: The Princess of Snow and Blood (Japanese: 擾乱 THE PRINCESS OF SNOW AND BLOOD) is an original Japanese anime television series produced by Bakken Record. Inspired by the 1973 film Lady Snowblood, itself an adaptation of the manga series of the same name by Kazuo Koike and Kazuo Kamimura, the series aired from April to June 2021.

== Plot ==
Joran is set in an alternate historical Japan, the 64th year of the Meiji era (1931 A.D.), where the shogun Tokugawa Yoshinobu continued to reign over Japan instead of handing over power to a Prime Minister. The nation of Japan discovered the "Dragon Vein" (龍脈, Ryumyaku), a unique energy source, within its own borders that allowed Japan to dramatically increase its technological progress through the Edo period. Despite this unexpected prosperity, the government is threatened by an insurgent group known as "Kuchinawa," which hates the isolationist policies of Tokugawa and aims to overthrow the Shogunate. In response, the Tokugawa government has created "Nue," a secret police organization dedicated to rooting out Kuchinawa. Sawa Yukimura is orphaned after her family are murdered by Kuchinawa to obtain a quantity of their blue blood which has the ability to transform humans into "Changelings", demonic beasts associated with animals. She unwillingly becomes an assassin for Nue in the hope of seeking revenge on her family's murderers.

== Characters ==
Sawa "Yuki" Yukimura (雪村 咲羽, Yukimura Sawa)
Voiced by: Suzuko Mimori
Publicly, Sawa is an 18-year-old young woman who runs a bookstore and cares for her adoptive sister Asahi. Privately though, she is a Nue executioner and the last surviving member of the Karasumori clan, her real name being Sawa Karasumori (烏森 咲羽, Karasumori Sawa). Possessing the power of the blue blood within her, Sawa is able to transform into a pureblooded Changeling when she fights, earning heightened vitality and superhuman powers. Her weapon of choice is a blade concealed in her parasol, and she has a white crow named Nana.
Elena "Hana" Hanakaze (花風 エレーナ, Hanakaze Erena)
Voiced by: Raychell
A Nue executioner who specializes in seductive techniques. Publicly, she is a famous novelist and sex worker in the red-light district. Elena is notably free-spirited and prefers to live life passionately and wildly. Her weapons of choice are a whip and a crossbow concealed in a parasol.
Makoto "Tsuki" Tsukishiro (月城 真琴, Tsukishiro Makoto)
Voiced by: Shouta Aoi
A Nue executioner who specializes in information gathering. Makoto identifies as a man and publicly poses as a bandoneon performer. He is level-headed and independent, with his own agenda outside of being an executioner. Makoto possesses a pessimistic view that everyone is placed into a set role throughout their lives. His weapon of choice is a lighted sword concealed in his cane.
Asahi Nakamura (中村 浅陽, Nakamura Asahi)
Voiced by: Ayasa Itō
A seven-year-old girl who Sawa took in during a mission for Nue. Asahi is conflicted towards Sawa, who is responsible for killing her parents, but also treats her like a younger sister. She makes up her mind to live peacefully with Sawa in the end and prevent her from killing anyone.
Jin Kuzuhara (葛原 仁, Kuzuhara Jin)
Voiced by: Chikahiro Kobayashi
The leader of Nue and dedicated protector of the shogun. He found Sawa as she was burying her family, and then trained her to be a Nue executioner. His real name is Iori Makabe, and he holds Sawa in high regard despite her reluctance to be an executioner.
Rinko Takemichi (竹道凛子, Takemichi Rinko)
Voiced by: Atsumi Tanezaki
A young woman and Nue executioner who has no knowledge of her past or original identity. She underwent painful surgery to have 40 bands of oronium metal inserted into her body with which she can create razor sharp weapons. She is a heavy drinker, but is a functional drunk and is still able to operate under the influence of alcohol. She is tasked by Jin to maintain surveillance on Sawa.
Janome (蛇埜目)
Voiced by: Shunsuke Sakuya
He is the leader of the Kuchinawa, a group opposed to the rule of Tokugawa Yoshinobu, the shogun. He first worked for the shogun using the Karasumori clan's rare blue blood, performing inhuman experiments to create super beings. He then attempted to create artificial Changelings for his own benefit.

== Production and release ==
On February 9, 2021, the anime original television series was announced in a press conference by Bushiroad. The series was animated by Bakken Record and directed by Susumu Kudou. Rika Nezu served as series composition writer, and co-wrote the scripts with Kunihiko Okada. Kano Komiyama designed the characters, and Michiru composed the series' music. It premiered on March 31, 2021, on streaming platforms and aired from April 7 to June 23, 2021, on NTV's AnichU programming block and other channels. Raise A Suilen performed the opening theme song "Exist" and the ending theme song "Embrace of Light". Crunchyroll streamed the series worldwide outside of Asia. Medialink has licensed the series in Southeast Asia and South Asia. Aniplus will release the series in South Korea.

== Episode list ==
| No. | Title (Note: All English titles are taken from Crunchyroll.) | Directed by (Note: Information is taken from the ending credits of each episode.) | Written by | Original release date (Note: Episodes are released on streaming platforms a week before their original air date on television.) |
|---|---|---|---|---|
| 1 | "Confidential File 101, The Blue Flower of Carnage"; Transliteration: "Kimitsu Jikō Ichi Maru Ichi Aoki Shura no Hana" (Japanese: 機密事項一〇一アオキシュラノハナ) | Susumu Kudō | Rika Nezu | April 7, 2021 |
Sawa spends the day in her bookstore, accepting a donation of books from a young man and receiving instructions in books brought to her by a young boy. After a meager meal prepared by Asahi, Sawa joins fellow Nue agents Makoto Tsukishiro and Elena Hanakaze in a brothel. They then meet with Jin Kuzuhara, who mentions a man named Janome who has been smuggling foreign animals into the country to use for "Changelings". Later, Makoto and Elena target a man running a smuggling operation, but only find bales of rice. Outside Tokyo Castle, Sawa encounters a white tiger Changeling and she transforms herself into her crow form. She discovers that the unwilling Changeling is the young man from earlier in the day, but she is forced to kill him. Elsewhere, a large monkey Changeling slaughters her way into a government office and steals a roster of Tokyo-based Nue agents. She delivers it to a man with a snake tattoo, who realizes that "that crow" from his past is still alive. As Sawa sleeps, she has a nightmare of her family being slaughtered by a man with a snake tattoo on his back, while Asahi picks up a knife to kill her.
| 2 | "Confidential File 033, The Treasurer"; Transliteration: "Kimitsu Jikō Maru San San Kinko-ban" (Japanese: 機密事項〇三三キンコバン) | Ken Hagiwara | Kunihiko Okada | April 14, 2021 |
Nue agents and informants in Tokyo are being murdered and Jin realizes their names were on the secret Nue roster stolen by Kuchinawa. He suspects a traitor to which Makoto suggests Sawa, but Jin recalls how he trained Sawa as a Nue executioner. The next day, Sawa and Elena are tasked with escorting a woman out of Tokyo. She is Kyoko, the woman known as "The Treasurer" because of her ability to remember and recall information. At the bookstore, Makoto hands Asahi a jar of poison pills to kill Sawa as she was responsible for murdering Asahi's parents. Asahi failed to stab Sawa the previous night. Meanwhile, as Sawa escorts Kyoko through the tunnels, she discovers that Nue knows about the murder of the Karasumori clan, but the Nue threaten to kill Kyoko's five-year-old son if she speaks about it. Kyoko promises to tell Sawa the truth if Sawa can protect her and her son. As they reach the shore, Sawa and Elena fight off Janome's agents and a Changeling, but find that their boat has been sabotaged. Elena suddenly stabs Kyoko, telling her that her son is already dead.
| 3 | "Confidential File 614, The Enemy Within"; Transliteration: "Kimitsu Jikō Roku Ichi Yon Shishi Shinchū Mushi" (Japanese: 機密事項六一四シシシンチュウムシ) | Seo Hye-Jin | Rika Nezu | April 21, 2021 |
Jin tells Sawa that Kyoko was killed on the orders of the shogun. Makoto later suggests that Sawa separate herself from Asahi for her own protection, prompting her to recall when Jin indicated that Janome was the one responsible for the demise of the Karasumori clan. Sawa returns home and sends Asahi to live at a temple, giving her a cloth bag with a map and money. The Nue squad, Makoto, Elena and Sawa then accost the "cleaner" whom they suspect of working for Janome and feeding them false information, but he sets off an explosion and escapes. While Elena and Sawa search for the cleaner, Makoto finds and kills him. Makoto then reports the death to Jin who suspects Makoto's motives and reminds him of his situation, a cross-dresser within Nue. Later, Makoto withdraws a map he received from Kyoko before her death, following it to a secret repository where he finds a small book. Meanwhile, Sawa returns home to find the purse she gave Asahi and blood-stained tracks leading outside. In his hideout, Janome is joined by his accomplice Makoto, and gloats that with Asahi, the Karasumori siblings will now be reunited.
| 4 | "Confidential File 099, Kuchinawa"; Transliteration: "Kimitsu Jikō Zero Kyū Kyū Kuchinawa" (Japanese: 機密事項〇九九クチナワ) | Masashi Nakamura | Kunihiko Okada | April 28, 2021 |
Sawa sets off to rescue Asahi, but is stopped and seized by Jin, who warns her that it is a trap. However, Jin's car is blown up and Makoto abducts the unconscious Sawa. They arrive at Janome's base where he threatens to kill Asahi unless she agrees to become his prisoner. Janome takes some of Sawa's blood and uses it to refine his formula in order to perfect his Changeling experiments. He then reveals that he kept a few members of Sawa's family barely alive. Suddenly, Makoto cuts Asahi free and manages to free Sawa, but his right arm is bitten off by Janome's giant snakes. Janome swallows some of the refined blue blood, turning himself into a large snake-like Changeling. Sawa transforms into her crow form, but she struggles against Janome. The chaos allows her barely conscious brother Takeru to toss vials of flammable chemicals at Janome, sparking a fire and giving Sawa an opening to cleave him in two. Makoto escapes as Janome's headquarters engulfs in flames, and Sawa is torn between dying with her brother or leaving with Asahi. Meanwhile, Jin and Elena are outside, considering if they should risk saving Sawa from the inferno.
| 5 | "Confidential File 620: Divine Right"; Transliteration: "Kimitsu Jikō Roku Ni Maru Kamu Nagara" (Japanese: 機密事項六二〇カムナガラ) | Seo Hye-Jin | Rika Nezu | May 5, 2021 |
Sawa's brother Takeru sacrifices himself to save Sawa who emerges from the burning building with Asahi. Having exacted her revenge, Sawa is reluctant to do any more work for Nue. Makoto supports the anti-shogun revolutionaries with weapons before preparing to leave by car with a foreign agent. After he reveals that Sawa is still alive, Makoto decides to stay, so the agent draws his gun to kill him and a shot is heard. Meanwhile, Elena discovers that she is pregnant by an unknown man and her adoring ghost writer offers to be the baby's father. Elena reveals to Jin that she is pregnant, however he sends her on a mission with Sawa to stop the revolutionaries and capture their leader. During the fight, Sawa is noncommittal and Elena is almost killed. Elena reveals that she has been granted a pardon and given a new identity by the shogun, May Yonezawa, and warns Sawa to trust no-one but herself as she departs. In the morning, as Sawa is walking home she sees crowd gathered around the apparently charred remains of Elena and her ghostwriter. Back at home, Sawa is distressed at being surrounded by death and is conflicted over her concern for Asahi. She then willingly agrees to take one of Makoto's poison pills from Asahi, offering the child a way to obtain her revenge.
| 6 | "Confidential File 623, Daybreak"; Transliteration: "Kimitsu Jikō Roku Ni San Shinonome" (Japanese: 機密事項六二三シノノメ) | Ken Hagiwara | Kunihiko Okada | May 12, 2021 |
After ingesting the poison pill, Sawa appears dead, but will reawaken in three hours according to Makoto's instructions which will enable the sisters to escape Nue together. The messenger boy notifies Jin, who visits to confirm her death. Events follow according to Makoto's predictions, and Sawa is soon taken away to be buried while Asahi accompanies her. Fifteen minutes before the three hour limit, Jin and the gravediggers leave the cemetery and Asahi begins digging for Sawa's coffin. She digs Sawa out in time and hands her the address of the Asakura Temple in Iwai Prefecture. Meanwhile, Nue find the body of the murdered English agent in his car, indicating Makoto is alive. Asahi and Sawa reach the harbor where Sawa affirms her name 'Karasumori'. While on the run from Nue agents in a forest, Makoto takes three of the hallucinogenic pain killers. At a cabinet meeting, the shogun receives news that foreign backed revolutionaries continued even after the leader of Kuchinawa was declared dead. In private Jin tells the shogun that he will shortly be obtaining Janome's blue blood formula but neglects to mention that Sawa and her brother are dead, eliminating the source for further production. Later, Jin kills two soldiers beating up revolutionaries while Sawa arrives at the Asakura Temple with Asahi.
| 7 | "Confidential File 637, A Fleeting Spring"; Transliteration: "Kimitsu Jikō Roku San Nana Tamayura no Haru" (Japanese: 機密事項六三七タマユラノハル) | Masashi Nakamura | Rika Nezu | May 19, 2021 |
Asahi and Sawa reach the Asakura Temple and meet Rinko, who claims to be the granddaughter of the host, actually sent by Jin and has murdered the host to take over the temple. She offers them accommodation in abandoned cottage. At Nue headquarters, Jin questions the captured revolutionary Seiji, foster son of Dr. Ijichi Todoroki, about the contents of Makoto's notebook. Meanwhile, the very ill Makoto is collecting three hidden clues to the whereabouts of a treasure to fund the overthrow of the Tokugawas. Sawa takes Asahi to the local school where she enjoys the company of other children and is watched over by the teacher Oikawa. Makoto meets Jin, handing over what he claims are the two remaining vials of crystalized blue blood. Later, Makoto visits the Asakura Temple and sees Sawa who has become more relaxed, but is stopped from talking to her by Asahi. Later, Sawa and Asahi join Oikawa for the local festival and spend the evening together. However, Makoto approaches Sawa and reveals that he has always admired the vengeful swordswoman and is disappointed to see the change that has come over her. When Sawa refuses to leave with him, Makoto kills Oikawa; promptly swallowing a blue crystal to become a cat-like Changeling. Makoto then threatens Asahi and slashes her before Sawa can save her, provoking Sawa to change into her white crow form.
| 8 | "Confidential File 642, The Witching Hour"; Transliteration: "Kimitsu Jikō Roku Yon Ni Ōmagatoki" (Japanese: 機密事項六四二オウマガトキ) | Tadahito Matsubayashi | Rika Nezu | May 26, 2021 |
Sawa viscously attacks Makoto for attacking Asahi but finds that Makoto's Changeling form is more that a match for her. Although wounded, Sawa eventually gains the upper hand, cutting Makoto deeply. Makoto expressed his pleasure to die under Sawa's blade, however recalled of her promise to Asahi, Sawa hesitates to deal the fatal blow. Depressed, Makoto expressed disappointment that he "can't take the role after all this" , and tells Sawa that he "holds the world but as the world, a stage where every man must play a part" , and asks Sawa to come back. The words have driven Sawa into exasperation, when the sky begins to be clouded by crows. A dark, bird-like Changeling emerges suddenly, swooping down from the sky and kills Makoto, and then abducts the unconscious Sawa. The Changeling seems to be created by Jin who is intent on saving Sawa, and he appears with the captured revolutionary Seiji, who is told to follow what Jin ordered. Sawa is taken to a remote location to recover. Days later, Sawa regains consciousness but she is despondent and suicidal after realizing everyone she cared for is dead. Jin tries to console her and tells her of his own brutal upbringing. He then calls on Elena to carry out one last job.
| 9 | "Confidential File 668, Ethereal Love"; Transliteration: "Kimitsu Jikō Roku Roku Hachi Sudama no Ai" (Japanese: 機密事項六六八スダマノアイ) | Ken Hagiwara | Kunihiko Okada | June 2, 2021 |
Jin asks Sawa to work with him again before he leaves to return to Tokyo. Rinko arrives at the cottage and introduces herself to Sawa as another Nue executioner who had been tasked with watching Sawa and Asahi. Sawa decides to return to her home town and Rinko accompanies her. Jin is notified that Sawa is required to create new mass-produced batches of the drug to produce an unstoppable army for the shogun, but Jin insists that she has more value as an executioner. Sawa and Rinko arrive at the ruins of the Karasumori village where she makes an offering to her family's passing and vows to pursue her revenge. As Sawa and Rinko ride the train back to Tokyo, it is boarded by Kuchinawa agents who have taken the Deputy Minister of Foreign Affairs hostage and demand the release of one of their members who is being held prisoner. Rinko then displays her ability to control the metal bands of oronium within her body to create weapons and slays them. When Sawa returns to her bookstore, she finds a note left in a book. She then visits Jin, but when he offers her a new mission, she slices the clothing from his back revealing snake-like marks caused by Janome's experiments.
| 10 | "Confidential File 089, Star Sign"; Transliteration: "Kimitsu Jikō Maru Hachi Kyū Dai Zokushō" (Japanese: 機密事項〇八九ダイゾクショウ) | Masashi Nakamura | Rika Nezu | June 9, 2021 |
At the scene of Makoto's death Jin burns the notebooks he had in his possession. He pays off a young boy who found the body to secure his silence, but kills the cleaner. A flashback to years earlier, shows Janome's experiments into immortality on unwilling prisoners using venom-based drugs. Yoshio, one of the inmates, kills himself with a piece of stolen glass, but his friend Iori uses the glass to kill 38 fellow prisoners and 14 guards and escape. He is captured by a Nue agent who refers to himself as "Kotodama" and is taken before the shogun as a prefect candidate because of his powerful thirst for life. He is given the name Jin Kuzuhara and trained by Kotodama who teaches him that "people will betray you, friend or foe". After Janome left the shogun to pursue his experiments alone, Jin was assigned to protect the Karasumori clan, and only the woman Towa Karasumori became aware of his presence. However, Jin was later ordered to kill the clan after they refused to use their special powers to assist the shogun. Jin reluctantly participates in Nue's slaughter of the Karasumori, allowing only Towa's daughter Sawa to survive, but then kills Kotodama to protect the child. Back in the present, Sawa asks Jin if he murdered her clan.
| 11 | "Confidential File 701, Past and Future"; Transliteration: "Kimitsu Jikō Nana Maru Ichi Koshikata Yukusue" (Japanese: 機密事項七〇一コシカタユクスエ) | Susumu Kudō, Chigai Okado, Seo Hye-Jin | Kunihiko Okada | June 16, 2021 |
Jin admits to his involvement in the slaughter of the Karasumori clan, leaving Sawa in disbelief. The army's special forces arrive at Jin's house. He provides an underground escape route for Sawa and offers to meet her at midnight. As Sawa runs through the tunnels, she is assisted to avoid the special forces by the heavily pregnant Elena. As they emerge, they are found by Rinko, who attacks Sawa with her razor-sharp metal bands. Sawa discovers after severing some of the bands that they also harm Rinko, weakening her enough to allow Sawa to defeat her. Sawa and Elena return to Sawa's bookshop, where Elena tells that the Ryumyaku has been weakening and the rebels are drawing closer to defeating Tokugawa. Suddenly, Asahi appears, Elena revealed that she is saved by Seiji, who is forced to do so under the plan of Jin, however she has avoided mentioning that Jin actually ordered Seiji to inject blue blood into Asahi, so now she inherits the blue blood lineage. Elena goes into labor and gives birth to a baby girl with Sawa and Asahi's help, while the conflicts between the rebels and the government forces are raging on outside in the streets. Later, Sawa promises to stay with Asahi and offers her mother's bloodstained diary as a way for them to record their future together. While Asahi sleeps, Sawa is overcome by emotion as she recalls her life to date, then takes her sword and heads off to complete her revenge against the shogun, Yoshinobu Tokugawa.
| 12 | "Confidential File 707, The Land of Blessed Words"; Transliteration: "Kimitsu Jikō Nana Maru Nana Kotodama no Sakihafu Kuni" (Japanese: 機密事項七〇七コトダマノサキハフクニ) | Susumu Kudō | Rika Nezu | June 23, 2021 |
Sawa has decided to kill the shogun Yoshinobu Tokugawa, asking Elena to look after Asahi if she does not return. As Sawa approaches the shogun's palace, she is taken by a black crow Changeling which she recognizes as Jin Kuzuhara. She attacks Jin for lying all his life, but he refuses to fight her, stating that he always wanted to protect her, and he will take care of Yoshinobu himself. He flies to the palace and finds Yoshinobu as a frail, frightened old man after Jin supplied him a placebo instead of the Karasumori elixir he expected. Jin kills Yoshinobu as the Kuchinawa storm the palace and set it on fire. On her way home, Sawa is stabbed from behind by Rinko. Sawa manages to return to her bookshop where Asahi talks excitedly about the future, unaware of Sawa's injury. The mortally wounded Sawa sits quietly beside Asahi as life slowly fades from her body. In an epilogue set several years later, Asahi is now seventeen years old and with Elena's daughter, Satsuki, who is reading from the diary which Sawa and Asahi were going to write together. Asahi recalls her past and her determination to be like Sawa, protecting others. The white crow alights on Asahi's shoulder, acknowledging her as the continuation of the Karasumori bloodline.
