= Marvelous+ =

Studio album by Fanatic Crisis
- Released: July 28, 2004
- Genre: Rock
- Length: 48:13
- Language: Japanese
- Label: Stoic Stone

Fanatic Crisis chronology
Neverland (2003)	Marvelous+ (2004)

Marvelous+ is the ninth studio album by Japanese band Fanatic Crisis, released on July 28, 2004, by Stoic Stone label. It became the band's final album, as they disbanded in 2005.

The singles included are "Tsuki no Mahō", used as theme song for the television program Guru Guru Ninety Nine; "Karasu", theme song for the program AX Music Factory; and "everlove", theme song for the Japanese drama Shin inochi no Genbakara. In 2019, three members of Fanatic Crisis reunited as Fantastic Circus and re-recorded the singles in 2024, releasing them on the album TENSEISM BEST SINGLES [2001-2004].

== Reception ==
=== Commercial performance ===
Marvelous+ reached number 18 on Oricon Albums Chart and remained on chart for two weeks. It sold approximately 13,451 copies while on chart. It also reached No. 4 on Tower Records' Japanese pop and rock albums chart. The singles "Tsuki no Mahō", "Karasu" and "everlove" reached No. 37, No. 22, and No. 10 on the Oricon chart, respectively.

In its review of the album, the music magazine CD Journal praised Marvelous+, noting that "the band's talent for turning catchy melodies into rock is consistently strong".

== Track listing ==
All lyrics are written by Tsutomu Ishizuki.

No.	Title	Length
1.	"Claudia" (クラウディア)	4:41
2.	"Karasu" (鴉〈KARASU〉 )	4:43
3.	"Kanojo wa Tenshidatta." (彼女は天使だった。)	4:31
4.	"Invader" (インヴェイダー)	4:03
5.	"Tsuki no Maho" (月の魔法 )	4:38
6.	"Satire ~Urei no Satian~" (Satire ～憂いのサタイアン～)	3:23
7.	"Remon" (檸檬)	5:36
8.	"Kamikaze" (神風)	3:21
9.	"Shinju" (真珠)	5:26
10.	"Knight!"	3:36
11.	"everlove"	4:20
Total length:		48:13

== Personnel ==
- Tsutomu Ishizuki − vocals
- Kazuya − lead guitar
- Shun − rhythm guitar
- Ryuji − bass
- Tohru − drums
