= With-you =

1998 song by La'cryma Christi

Single by La'cryma Christi

from the album Lhasa
- B-side: "Egos and Lies"
- Released: May 8, 1998
- Genre: Rock
- Length: 16:08
- Label: Polydor
- Composer: Taka
- Lyricist: Taka

La'cryma Christi singles chronology
"Nangoku" (1997)	"With-you" (1998)	"Mirai Kōro" (1998)

Music video
- "With-you" on YouTube

"With-you" is a single by Japanese rock band La'cryma Christi, released on May 8, 1998, by Polydor. The title track, written and composed by vocalist Taka, was played on the television program Sunday Jungle. It was included on the album Lhasa, with a different mix, and on several later compilations by the band, such as Single Collection and La'cryma Christi Singles + Clips.

The band DaizyStripper covered the song for the album 90's V-Pop Best Hit Cover Songs, where visual kei bands tribute artists who were important to the scene in the 1990s.

== Commercial performance ==
The single reached number ten on Oricon Singles Chart, remaining on chart for fourteen weeks. In its first week on the charts, it sold 49,250 copies. It sold around 169,000 copies in total, becoming the band's second best-selling single, behind the following "Mirai Kōro". While Lhasa and the next single “Mirai Kōro” received record sales certifications from RIAJ, “With-you” did not achieve this.

== Track listing ==
All lyrics are written by Taka.

No.	Title	Music	Length
1.	"With-you"	Taka	5:19
2.	"Egos and Lies"	Shuse	5:32
3.	"With-you" (unvocal version)	Taka	5:16
Total length:			16:08

== Personnel ==
- Taka – vocals
- Hiro – lead guitar
- Koji – rhythm guitar
- Shuse – bass
- Levin – drums
