= Raychell =

- Also known as: Lay
- Born: January 13, 1985 (age 41)
- Genres: Electronicore; dubstep; electronica; rap metal; new wave; pop rock; post-punk; gothic rock
- Occupations: Singer; musician; actress
- Instruments: Vocals; bass guitar
- Years active: 2009–present

Raychell (born January 13, 1985) is a Japanese musician, singer, actress and voice actress who is affiliated with Ace Crew Entertainment. She made her major debut as a singer in 2010 under the name Lay. In 2019, she made her voice acting debut as the character Rei "LAYER" Wakana in the multimedia franchise BanG Dream!, and later was cast as the character Shano Himegami in D4DJ. She was also a member of the visual kei band Shazna.

== Biography ==
=== Music career ===
Raychell was born on January 13, 1985. She had been performing as an artist under the name Ray since at least 2009, when she released the song "Love U", which was used in commercials for the company Tokai Network Club. In 2010, she made her major debut with Avex under the stage name Lay. Her stage name Ray was inspired by Ray Charles, while the name Lay was meant to represent lying down, and her belief that singing while lying down would heal listeners. Her first single "Kono Ai de Aru Yō ni" (この愛であるように) was released on June 2, 2010; the title track is used as the theme song to the film The Poem of Our Time. Her second single "Smiling!" was released on May 4, 2011; the title track is used as an ending theme to the Tamagotchi! anime series. In 2013, she changed her stage name to Raychell and released her first solo album L R. She released her third single "Hikari" (ひかり) on November 13, 2013, and her fourth single Stay Hungry on June 18, 2014; "Stay Hungry" was used as the opening theme to the television drama Hakata Stay Hungry. She released the mini-album The 3rd on February 4, 2015, and the mini-album 0 on January 20, 2016. She released the album Are You Ready to Fight on March 1, 2017, and later that year joined the band Shazna as its second vocalist following the band's resumption of activities.

In 2019, as part of the multimedia project BanG Dream!, Raychell became a member of the band Raise A Suilen, serving as its vocalist and bassist.

=== Acting career ===
Raychell made her voice acting debut in 2019 when she was cast as the character Rei "LAYER" Wakana in BanG Dream. She was later cast as Shano Himegami in the mixed media project D4DJ. In 2021, she was cast as Elena Hanakaze in the anime series Joran: The Princess of Snow and Blood.

== Filmography ==
=== Anime ===
2019

- BanG Dream! 2nd Season, Rei "LAYER" Wakana

2020

- BanG Dream! 3rd Season, Rei "LAYER" Wakana
- BanG Dream! Girls Band Party! Pico: Ohmori, Rei "LAYER" Wakana

2021

- BanG Dream! Film Live 2nd Stage, Rei "LAYER" Wakana
- BanG Dream! Girls Band Party! Pico Fever!, Rei "LAYER" Wakana
- D4DJ, Shano Himegami
- D4DJ Petit Mix, Shano Himegami
- Joran: The Princess of Snow and Blood, Elena Hanakaze

2022

- BanG Dream! Poppin'Dream!, Rei "LAYER" Wakana

== Discography ==
=== Singles ===
- "Kono Ai de Aru Yō ni" (この愛であるように) (June 2, 2010)
- "Smiling!" (May 4, 2011)
- "Hikari" (ひかり) (November 13, 2013)
- "Stay Hungry" (June 18, 2014)

=== Albums ===
- L R (April 24, 2013)
- Are You Ready to Fight (March 1, 2017)

=== Mini-albums ===
- The 3rd (February 4, 2015)
- 0 (January 20, 2016)
