= One -one for all- =

Studio album by Fanatic Crisis
- Released: March 4, 1998
- Genre: Alternative rock; power pop
- Length: 48:34
- Language: Japanese
- Label: For Life

Fanatic Crisis chronology
| Marble (1996) | One -one for all- (1998) | The.Lost.Innocent (1999) |

Singles from One -one for all-
- 1. "Super Soul" Released: August 6, 1997; 2. "Sleeper" Released: October 29, 1997; 3. "One -You are the One-" Released: January 28, 1998

One -one for all- is the second studio album and first major release by Japanese rock band Fanatic Crisis. It was released by the label For Life on March 4, 1998. The first edition was housed in a plastic sleeve, and came with a 52-card deck (featuring the band members) inside of a box.

It was considered one of the best albums from 1989 to 1998 in an edition of the magazine Band Yarouze. The album's singles are "Super Soul", "Sleeper", ending theme of Sunday Jungle television show, and "One -You are the One-", which was theme song for Unbeliveable. In 2019, Tsutomu Ishizuki, Kazuya and Shun reunited as a sub-unit of the band, called Fantastic Circus. All singles from One -one for all- were included on the re-recording and greatest hits album Tenseism released by the trio in March 2023. Additionally, a new music video for "One -You are the One-" was released in February 2023.

== Background and release ==
Fanatic Crisis's popularity began to grow in 1996, when the single "Tsuki no Hana" was distributed by a major label. After another single, this time distributed by Mercury, they got a definitive contract with For Life Records in 1997. "Super Soul" was released in August as their first work produced by a major label. It was followed by "Sleeper" in October and "One -you are the one-" in January. After One -one for all- was released in March, the band started the 1998 Naked Tour.

== Critical reception ==
CD Journal praised the uplifting atmosphere of the album and stated that "hard and flashy songs are conspicuous throughout".

== Commercial performance ==
One -one for all- peaked at 5th position on Oricon Albums Chart, staying on chart for seven weeks and selling an estimated 119,360 copies. It is Fanatic Crisis's highest-charting album, despite being the second best-selling album, behind The.Lost.Innocent.

Both "Super Soul" and "Sleeper" reached 23rd position on Oricon Singles Chart and "One -you are the one-" reached 14th position, becoming the band's third best-selling single.

== Track listing ==
All lyrics are written by Tsutomu Ishizuki.

| No. | Title | Music | Length |
|---|---|---|---|
| 1. | "Rewind for One" | − |
| 2. | "Freedom" | Tsutomu Ishizuki |
| 3. | "Circus" (サーカス) | Kazuya |
| 4. | "Super Soul" | Kazuya |
| 5. | "Dokusaisha" (独裁者) | Tsutomu Ishizuki |
| 6. | "Speed Collector" (スピードコレクター) | Ryuji |
| 7. | "Night Shadow" | Shun |
| 8. | "Still Alone" | Kazuya |
| 9. | "Sleeper" | Tsutomu Ishizuki |
| 10. | "Hysteric Earth" | Kazuya |
| 11. | "One -One for All-" | Shun |
| 12. | "One for Future/z" | − |

== Personnel ==
- Tsutomu Ishizuki − vocals
- Kazuya − lead guitar
- Shun − rhythm guitar
- Ryuji − bass
- Tohru − drums
