= Nightwalker: The Midnight Detective =

Japanese television anime series

- Nightwalker — The Midnight Detective
- Cover of the original Nightwalker game

Nightwalker 真夜中の探偵 (Naitouōkā Mayonaka no Tantei)
- Genre: Horror; Mystery; Adventure
- Video game
- Developer: Tomboy (PC-9801); Arieroof (Windows 2000)
- Platform: PC-9801; Windows 2000
- Released: 22 December 1993 (PC-9801); 25 May 2001 (Windows 2000)
- Anime television series
- Directed by: Yutaka Kagawa (1-4); Kiyotoshi Sasano (5-12)
- Produced by: Hiroaki Inoue; Kinya Watanabe
- Written by: Ryota Yamaguchi
- Music by: Akifumi Tada
- Studio: AIC
- Licensed by: AUS: Siren Visual; NA: Central Park Media (former) Discotek Media; UK: MVM Films
- Original network: TV Tokyo
- Original run: 8 July 1998 – 23 September 1998
- Episodes: 12
- Manga
- Written by: United Soji
- Published by: MediaWorks
- Magazine: Monthly Dengeki Comic Gao!
- Original run: September 1998 – February 1999

Nightwalker — The Midnight Detective (Japanese: ナイトウォーカー真夜中の探偵, Hepburn: Naitouōkā Mayonaka no Tantei) is a late night anime TV series created by Ayana Itsuki that is adapted from a PC-9801 game of the same name.

Nightwalker incorporates elements of the horror, detective story and vampire genres, and is critically noted as a vampire story "with a bit of a twist". The main character is Shido, a vampire who protects humans from other supernatural creatures. A private investigator by day and a demon hunter by night, Shido solves murder cases caused by monsters called Nightbreeds.

== Video game ==
Mayonaka no Tantei Nightwalker (真夜中の探偵 Nightwalker) is a 16-color PC-9801 eroge released by Tomboy in December 1993. Nightwalker is an adventure game, focused mostly on character interaction and problem solving. While the main characters of this game have the same names and similar appearances to their anime equivalents, their personalities are generally more easy-going and their backgrounds are less tragic (they all have living relatives). In comparison to the anime, the game is fairly lighthearted, with Shidō and Guni providing comic relief.

Nightwalker was initially developed as a spin-off project of the adult game Bishōjo Audition: Find an Idol released by Tomboy in February 1993, with the character Rihoko Ayukawa from that game reappearing as a heroine. However, in the process of refining the setting, the heroine's name was changed to Riho Yamazaki, her design was changed, and the story and setting were separated from the previous work. The concept of the world of Nightwalker itself is based on illustrations from 1992.

In 2001 the developer Arieroof remade this game for Windows 2000 as just Nightwalker. This version uses the same source drawings as the original game, except with 256-color displays, and plays similarly. The characters are recolored, and match the anime more closely. (Shidō's hair is purple, Guni's body is green. Inexplicably, Yayoi's hair is bubblegum pink.)

== Anime ==
=== Development ===
One oddity of the series is that the character designs for the first four episodes are different from the main character designs used for the rest of the series and both the opening and ending. This is due to the fact that these episodes were intended to be presented as an OVA, with the remaining episodes added after the fact to make up the entire series. In fact, Nightwalker is the first anime TV series (as opposed to OVA) adaptation of an adult game.

=== Story ===
In the world of Nightwalker, attacks by the nightbreed (ナイトブリード), minor demons that possess humans and feed on their souls, are relatively common. As a group, nightbreeds (often referred to by the abbreviation 'breed') are usually self-serving and of low intelligence, and they drive a human host to commit crimes. Because these breed-inspired crimes are often difficult to identify, a special agency known as the N.O.S. has been organized to investigate and solve breed-related cases.

Shido, the main character of the series, is a vampire who decided to defend humans against his demonic brethren as atonement for the sins he committed early in his vampiric life. He knows little of his life prior to becoming a vampire, and even his name is a pseudonym he took when he arrived in Japan. Upon settling down in Japan, Shido established a one-man (plus one-secretary) private investigator office, which he uses as a means to hunt breeds while keeping his true nature secret. Shido even keeps his identity secret from Riho, a teenage high school girl he decided to employ as a secretary after her parents were killed in a breed attack.

All is not business as usual at Shido's office, however, as Shido is soon forced to reveal to Riho that he is the same sort of creature that killed her parents. Furthermore, Shido's powerful and obsessive sire, Cain, has plans in motion to reclaim Shido, as well as to initiate the 'Golden Dawn', a secret with far-reaching implications for all creatures of the night.

=== Characters ===
- Shido Tatsuhiko (紫藤 龍彦) Voiced by: Takumi Yamazaki (Japanese); Richard Cansino (English)

The main character, Tatsuhiko Shido is a private detective. He is also a vampire with the ability to manipulate his own blood to form weapons. It is also implied that he has the ability to create illusions. Shido has an outwardly mercurial personality, but beneath that, he is very serious and dedicated so much so that he is likely to blame himself when something goes wrong. He is often employed by Yayoi Matsunaga. He is a quarter-vampire (one of his grandfathers was a full-blood vampire, and the rest of his family line is of Japanese descent), Shidō has inherited guardianship of the passage between the mortal world and the demon world, but otherwise he lives as a human. His 'day job' is private investigator, and he works closely with the Kanagawa police. Through this connection, he learns that a girl he was unable to save from nightbreeds was a student at St. Michael Girls Academy, and goes to the school to investigate. He is quite pleased about this because he is something of a pervert, and takes plenty of time out to ogle the teenage girls.

- Yayoi Matsunaga (松永 弥生) Voiced by: Emi Shinohara (Japanese); Mari Devon (English)

An agent with the N.O.S. anti-nightbreed crime unit. Yayoi pays Shido with her blood in exchange for his expertise in investigating nightbreeds, and their relationship goes beyond being strictly professional. In the game, Yayoi comes from a police family, and her father, the chief of the Yokohama police, worked closely with Shidō's vampiric relatives. As much as Yayoi resents it, she seems to be destined for the same role. She and Shidō dated prior to the game, but the relationship fell apart. Now they spend most of their time together bickering, and Shidō loves to tease her. Yet, there's still a bit of a spark between them.

- Riho Yamazaki (山崎理) Voiced by: Maaya Sakamoto (Japanese); Dorothy Elias-Fahn (English)

An orphaned high-school aged girl whose family was murdered by nightbreeds. Riho idolizes Shido and works as his secretary, but is initially unaware of that he is a vampire. She learns Shido's secret while attempting to help him with an investigation, but decides to continue working for him despite this. In both the PC Game and anime series, she is a student at St. Michael Academy, she shared a dorm room with Miyako, a girl who as murdered by nightbreeds. Normally cheerful and energetic, Riho is shocked and depressed by her friend's murder. When Shidō comes to her for help, she vows to avenge her friend's death and helps Shidō unravel the conspiracy based out of the school. Shidō drinks Riho's blood in the finalé of the game, and she becomes a vampire. Because of the death of her parents, she lives by herself in an apartment complex. Originally, Nightwalker was planned to have Rihoko Ayukawa, a character from a previous Tomboy game Bishōjo Audition, in the role of a heroine; as the project evolved, Rihoko became Riho.

- Guni (グニ) Voiced by: Ikue Otani (Japanese); Sandy Fox (English)

A small, fairy-like creature. Guni's relationship with Shido is like that of a familiar spirit, but she only assists him if she feels like it. She often irritates the others, especially Riho, with biting remarks.

- Cain (カイン) Voiced by: Hideyuki Tanaka (Japanese); Lex Lang (English)

Cain transformed Shido into a vampire long before the main events of the series. He and Shido once lived together in Transylvania; where they fed on countless innocent people. Over time Cain's cruelty drove Shido to leave him, though Cain refuses to let him go.

- Mikako (ミカコ) Voiced by: Makiko Ohmoto (Japanese); Lia Sargent (English)

A childhood friend of Riho's from school. She along with Shunichi and Riho are members of their school's film club.

- Shunichi (俊一) Voiced by: Akira Ishida (Japanese); Lex Lang (English)

A male friend of Riho and Mikako. He along with Riho and Mikako are members of the film club at school.

=== Episodes ===
The anime television series was broadcast on TV Tokyo from July 9, 1998, to September 24, 1998, with each episode referred as nights. In 2001, Central Park Media licensed and release the anime series on DVD in North America, under the U.S. Manga Corps label. The English dub was produced at Bang Zoom! Entertainment. The series is currently distributed by Siren Visual in Australia and in 2013 by MVM Films in the United Kingdom. Discotek Media has re-licensed the series in North America and released it on August 29, 2017.

No.	Title	Original release date
1	"A Visitor in the Night" "Yami wo kuru mono" (闇を来る者)	July 9, 1998
With Shido and Yayoi on the tail of a night breed causing car accidents, young Riho decides to investigate on her own - which has disastrous results, and ends up with her discovering Shido's secret.
2	"The Terms of Stardom" "Jyoyuu no jyouken" (女優の条件)	July 16, 1998
Yoko wants to become the greatest actress in the world. There is a short cut, but if you plan to sell your soul for fame and glory, it's best to find out all the details of the deal first.
3	"A Man on the Run" "Nigeru otoko" (逃げる男)	July 23, 1998
While hunting an acid-spitting breed possessing the body of an injured policeman, Shido is haunted by his creator warning about the coming 'golden dawn'.
4	"The Golden Dawn" "Ougon no yoake" (黄金の夜明け)	July 30, 1998
While Shido is distracted by a potential cross-breed's birth, Cain abducts Riho. Will Shido take the drastic action needed to save her life?
5	"Medicine for the Dead" "Shisha no kusuri" (死者の薬)	August 6, 1998
"What price is eternal life?" While Shido hunts a vindictive breed, Riho comes to terms with her new form of existence, and says goodbye to her friends.
6	"The Bottom of A Well" "Ido no soko" (井戸の底)	August 13, 1998
With Shido trapped in a well on a building site with the breed he was pursuing and the breed's hostage, Riho and Yayoi make a startling discovery in their search for him.
7	"A Mother & Her Son" "Haha to musuko" (母と息子)	August 20, 1998
Shido very reluctantly takes on the case of a breed feeding on small animals and pets, only to reveal the tragedy of a mother's love.
8	"A Soul Lost in the Darkness" "Yo aruku mono" (夜歩く者)	August 27, 1998
When an attempt to gain access to an old man's money goes badly wrong, Shido and Yayoi have to clear up the subsequent breed-related mess.
9	"Someone Else's Face" "Tanin no kao" (他人の顔)	September 3, 1998
The origin story of how Shido first came to the city, acquired Guni, and met Yayoi.
10	"Tears of an Angel" "Tenshi no namida" (天使の涙)	September 10, 1998
Life changes dramatically for the better when lonely, awkward Yuki finds a pendant containing the angel of happiness. But the angel is both more, and less, than he seems to be.
11	"A Witch in the Forest" "Mori no majyo" (森の魔女)	September 17, 1998
Two cases, one old, one new, of love and obsession and their terrible consequences, nevertheless reveal the potential of the human heart to overcome evil - and show Shido he is doing the right thing.
12	"Eternal Darkness" "Eien no yami" (永遠の闇)	September 24, 1998
Plagued by nightmares and horrifying visions sent by Cain, and acknowledging that nothing is truly forever, Shido finally enters into a relationship with Riho.

=== Music ===
The soundtrack for the Nightwalker anime, composed by Akifumi Tada, is noted for its jazz themes and prominent use of saxophones. The soundtrack also features "Gessekai" (月世界) by Buck-Tick as the opening theme, and "Mirai Kōro" (未来航路) by La'cryma Christi as the closing theme. Gessekai is unusual in that it was not a purpose-written tie-in song, but was selected from Buck-Tick's existing body of work. An official soundtrack was released in Japan on October 14, 1998, by Universal Music Japan.

NightWalker -Midnight Detective- Original Soundtrack track list
No.	Title	Length
1.	"Gessekai" (by Buck-Tick)
2.	"Mirai Kōro" (by La'cryma Christi)
3.	"Avant-title ~Prologue~"
4.	"Shidō's Theme ~Visitor in the Night~"
5.	"Peaceful Days ~Afternoon, Office~"
6.	"Riho's Theme"
7.	"Premonition of a Case"
8.	"Yayoi's Theme"
9.	"Peculiarity"
10.	"Breed Theme ~Shadows that Stir in Darkness~"
11.	"Lure of the Breed ~Sweet Temptation, then Destruction~"
12.	"Shidō's Rage"
13.	"Decisive Battle ~Fight of Darkness against Darkness~"
14.	"Case Closed"
15.	"Cain's Theme ~Beautiful Evil, Lure of Decadence and Beauty~"
16.	"Sorrowful Past ~Shidō's Distress~"
17.	"Eternal Darkness"
18.	"Gessekai" (instrumental)

=== Home releases ===
In Japan, Nightwalker: The Midnight Detective aired on TV Tokyo and was later released on VHS in 1998 on six VHS tapes with two episodes each. It was also released on DVD by Pioneer LDC in 2007. In North America, was licensed by US Manga Corps/Central Park Media and released on VHS in 2001 and on DVD in 2003. In the United Kingdom it was released on DVD by anime company MVM, and in Australia and New Zealand by Siren Visual Entertainment.

== Radio drama ==
Radio drama adaptation by Yosuke Kuroda was broadcast in 1995 on KBS Kyoto. In 1996, it was decided to release it as a drama CD, but it was never released on a major label and was later distributed in very small numbers by doujin circles.

== Manga ==
Manga adaptation by United Soji was published in Monthly Dengeki Comic Gao! in the September 1998 supplement, December 1998, and February 1999 issues. It is based on the radio drama version, and differs from the game and anime in many ways, such as setting and Shido's appearance and personality. It was not compiled in a book. There is also another manga by Ryuichi Makino.

== See also ==
- Vampire film
- List of vampire television series
