= The.Lost.Innocent =

Studio album by Fanatic Crisis
- Released: February 24, 1999
- Genre: Alternative rock; power pop
- Length: 69:50
- Label: For Life

Fanatic Crisis chronology
One -one for all- (1998)	The.Lost.Innocent (1999)	EAS (2000)

Singles from The.Lost.Innocent
- 1. "Rainy Merry-Go-Round" Released: May 13, 1998; 2. "Hinotori" Released: July 1, 1998; 3. "Maybe True" Released: September 23, 1998; 4. "Beauties -beauty eyes-" Released: January 1, 1999

The.Lost.Innocent is the third studio album by Japanese rock band Fanatic Crisis and their second major label release. It was released on the label For Life on February 24, 1999. The first edition featured a white digipack with a velcrow strap, while the second edition, with remastered sound, was released in a jewel case with a black cover.

The album's singles are "Rainy merry-go-round", "Hinotori", "beauties -beauty eyes-" and "Maybe true". In 2019, vocalist Tsutomu Ishizuki and guitarists Kazuya and Shun reunited as a subunit of the band, called Fantastic Circus. Singles from the album were included on the re-recording album Tenseism released by them in March 2023.

== Critical reception ==
In a review of the album, CD Journal website noted that the album contains many digital and cybernetic sounds, and stated "the [songs] that aren't singles are definitely more interesting."

== Commercial performance ==
The.Lost.Innocent peaked at number six on Oricon Albums Chart, remaining on chart for five weeks. On Billboard Japan, it reached seventh position. It is the band's best-selling album, with around 162,110 copies sold.

While in the band's history "Maybe true" became the highest-ranking single on chart, "Hinotori" was the best-selling.

== Track listing ==
All lyrics are written by Tsutomu Ishizuki.

No.	Title	Music	Length
1.	"006.9"	Tsutomu Ishizuki
2.	"Mobius Ring"	Tsutomu Ishizuki
3.	"Hinotori"	Kazuya
4.	"B.R.E.E.Z.E."	Tsutomu Ishizuki
5.	"Crazy for You"	Kazuya
6.	"Maybe True"	Tsutomu Ishizuki
7.	"Dear Myself"	Tsutomu Ishizuki
8.	"Masquerade in the Room"	Tsutomu Ishizuki
9.	"Ryuugu"	Tsutomu Ishizuki
10.	"Beauties -Beauty Eyes-"	Tsutomu Ishizuki
11.	"Rainy Merry-Go-Round"	Shun
12.	"Crawl"	Kazuya
13.	"Tsuki no Toriko"	Tsutomu Ishizuki
14.	"Unmei to Kanashi Sugiru Yokan"	Tsutomu Ishizuki
15.	"Kimi ga Iru Sekai"	Tsutomu Ishizuki

== Personnel ==
- Tsutomu Ishizuki − vocals
- Kazuya − lead guitar
- Shun − rhythm guitar
- Ryuji − bass
- Tohru − drums
