= Shazna =

Japanese visual kei rock band

- Origin: Japan
- Genres: New wave; pop rock; post-punk; gothic rock
- Years active: 1993–2000, 2006–2009, 2017–2019, 2023–present
- Labels: BMG Japan, Toshiba EMI, Rock Chipper
- Members: Izam; A・O・I; Niy
- Past members: Katsura; Raychell; Natsume; Asuka

Shazna (stylized as SHAZNA) is a Japanese visual kei rock band originally active from 1993 to 2000. Originally having a strong gothic/post-punk influence, the band's sound greatly shifted to a more new wave direction by 1996. At their peak in the mid-to-late 1990s, they were considered one of the "Four Heavenly Kings of visual kei" alongside La'cryma Christi, Malice Mizer and Fanatic Crisis. Their 1998 major label debut album Gold Sun and Silver Moon reached the number two position on the Oricon chart, sold over a million copies and was named "Rock Album of the Year" at the Japan Gold Disc Awards. Shazna has reunited several times; first in 2006, which saw the release of a new album, then in 2017 with the addition of three new female members. The core trio resumed activities for a third time in 2023.

== History ==
Shazna was formed in the summer of 1993 with Izam on vocals, A・O・I on guitar, Niy on bass and Katsura on drums, and began to actively perform in Tokyo. Katsura left in 1996 and joined Baiser, leaving the trio. Perhaps the band's most notable feature was vocalist Izam and his choice of fashion; taking the cross-dressing feminine look to an extreme. Izam was largely influenced by Boy George and Culture Club, whom he later did a cover album of in 1998.

With the release of their major debut single "Melty Love" on August 27, 1997, Shazna gained immense popularity and many awards. It reached number two on the Oricon chart, earned them the "Best Newcomer" award from the Japan Cable Awards (Nihon Yusen Taisho) and helped their album Gold Sun and Silver Moon, which was named "Rock Album of the Year" by Japan Gold Disc Awards, be certified Million by the RIAJ. The album was named one of the top albums from 1989–1998 in a 2004 issue of the music magazine Band Yarouze.

In 1999, Izam married famous idol Hinano Yoshikawa, only to file for separation two months later and divorce two months after that. Both the marriage and divorce caused a scandal.

In October they released a cover of Ippu-Do's "Violet September Love" as a single. In 1999 Shazna signed to Toshiba EMI and released the album Pure Hearts in June. Their last single (and their second Christmas single) "Winter's Review" was released in December. In January 2000, a singles collection was released, however in October Shazna went on an activity pause.

The members all went in different musical directions. Izam, with a much less feminine look, became a solo singer and turned to acting, appearing in several films such as Chinese Dinner, G@me and Pretty Guardian Sailor Moon: Act Zero, a special episode of the live-action series based on the popular Sailor Moon manga. Back in 1998 Izam also had a cameo appearance in the Crayon Shin-chan movie Crayon Shin-chan: Blitzkrieg! Pig's Hoof's Secret Mission, which used Shazna's song "Pureness" as its theme song. A・O・I performs as an acoustic guitarist and singer, and became a filmmaker. Niy performs with the band Fanble.

In June 2006, after 6 years Shazna announced that they were reuniting. They held their first concert on September 5, 2006, and released the single "Heart" on April 25. They released the album 10th Melty Life on August 8, 2007, 10 years after the release of their major single debut "Melty Love". On November 3, 2008, Shazna announced that they would disband and played their last concert on March 22, 2009, at Shibuya O-East.

Shazna's song "Melty Love" was covered by BugLug on the compilation Crush! -90's V-Rock Best Hit Cover Songs-. The album was released on January 26, 2011, and features current visual kei bands covering songs from bands that were important to the '90s visual kei movement.

In August 2017, Shazna officially reunited for the 20th anniversary of their major label debut. In addition to Izam, A・O・I and Niy, their lineup includes three new female members; second vocalist Raychell, drummer Natsume and saxophonist Asuka.

== Members ==
- Izam – vocals (1993–2000, 2006–2009, 2017–2019, 2023–present)
- A・O・I – guitar (1993–2000, 2017–2019, 2023–present)
- Niy – bass guitar (1993–2000, 2006–2009, 2017–2019, 2023–present)

=== Former members ===
- Katsura (桂‐KATSURA‐) – drums (1993–1996)
- Raychell – vocals (2017–2019)
- Natsume – drums (2017–2019)
- Asuka – saxophone (2017–2019)

== Discography ==
=== Studio albums ===
- Sophia (November 30, 1994)
- Melty Case (March 14, 1996)
- Raspberry Time (August 1, 1996), Oricon Albums Chart Peak Position: No. 43
- Promise Eve (January 22, 1997) No. 16
- Gold Sun and Silver Moon (January 22, 1998) No. 2
- Pure Hearts (June 30, 1999) No. 15
- 10th Melty Life (August 8, 2007)

=== Compilation albums ===
- Best Album 1993–2000: Oldies (January 1, 2000) No. 24
- Single Best Shazna & Izam (September 5, 2007, singles collection & Izam's solo)
- Shazna Love Selection - EP (December 12, 2014, ballads collection)

=== Singles ===
- "Stillness for Dear" (April 17, 1994, limited to 330 copies)
- "Dizziness" (December 8, 1995, limited to 500 copies)
- "Dizziness" (January 5, 1996, re-release with a B-side track, limited to 1000 copies)
- "Melty Love" (August 27, 1997), Oricon Singles Chart Peak Position: No. 2

Ending theme of 所さんのこれアリなんじゃないの!?

- "Violet September Love" (すみれ September Love; October 8, 1997) No. 2

Ending theme of Beat Takeshi's TV Tackle (ビートたけしのTVタックル)

- "White Silent Night" (December 3, 1997) No. 1

Ending theme of King's Brunch (王様のブランチ)

- "Sweet Heart Memory" (January 7, 1998) No. 2

Ending theme of Tonight 2 (トゥナイト2)

- "Pureness" (April 22, 1998) No. 4

Theme song of Crayon Shin-chan: Blitzkrieg! Pig's Hoof's Secret Mission

- "Love is Alive/Dear Love" (April 29, 1998) No. 6
- "Lover/Virgin" (恋人/Virgin; October 14, 1998) No. 6

"Lover" - Ending theme of ZZZ 所的蛇足講座
"Virgin" - Ending theme of Sunday Jungle (サンデージャングル)

- "Pink" (January 27, 1999) No. 15

Ending theme of ZZZ 所的蛇足講座

- "Piece of Love" (March 31, 1999) No. 17

Theme song of Kamikaze Kaito Jeanne

- "Tokyo Ballet Reprise/Kiss on Shelley" (Tokyo Ballet Reprise/シェリーに口づけ; June 9, 1999) No. 20
- "Aqua" (September 22, 1999) No. 45

Ending theme of Tonight 2 (トゥナイト2)

- "Winter's Review" (December 8, 1999) No. 44

Ending theme of the Japanese version of The Rugrats Movie

- "Heart" (心; April 25, 2007)
- "Koinotenpo" (コイノテンポ; December 28, 2018)

=== Demos ===
- "Enmity" (1993)
- "Shazna" (1993)
- "Voice of..." (January 9, 1994)

=== Videos ===
- Lavender Color Shazna Feeling (Lavender Color シャズナノキモチ; June 4, 1997)
- Melty Love (October 8, 1997)
- Silent Beauty (January 1, 1998)
- Pure Hearts (April 28, 1999)
- Dear September Lovers Shazna Live at Budokan '98 (December 26, 1998)
- Complete. -Last Live- (完結。-LAST LIVE-; July 15, 2009)
