= Blu-Billion =

- Origin: Japan
- Genres: Rock
- Years active: 2010-2020
- Labels: Resistar Records
- Website: blu-billion.jp

Blu-Billion (stylized as Blu-BiLLioN) is a Japanese visual kei rock band formed in 2010. Their single "S.O.S." reached the eighth place on the weekly Oricon Singles Chart. In January 2020, the Blu-Billion announced that they would disband on April 5 due to the illness of their leader and drummer Seika.

== Discography ==
=== Albums ===
Title	Release date	Oricon
Everlasting BLUE	June 29, 2011	185
SicKs	July 3, 2013	32
Genesis	July 22, 2015	25
Eden	October 30, 2017	67
Best-BiLLioN	July 30, 2019	62

=== Singles ===
Title	Release date	Oricon
"Count Down"	October 20, 2010	135
"colours"	January 26, 2011	142
"with me"	February 29, 2012	82
"WILL"	October 10, 2012	43
"MoSaic"	November 14, 2012	48
"ハートフラクタル"	March 6, 2013	38
"Aqua"	November 20, 2013	25
"Tresor-トレゾア-"	April 23, 2014	21
"GARDEN"	August 13, 2014	23
"Sincerely yours"	November 19, 2014	24
"Resonance-共鳴-/モノクロの花"	March 18, 2015	11
"Refrain/心灯-こころび-"	October 28, 2015	19
"S.O.S."	February 3, 2016	8
