= Daizystripper =

Japanese visual kei rock band

DaizyStripper
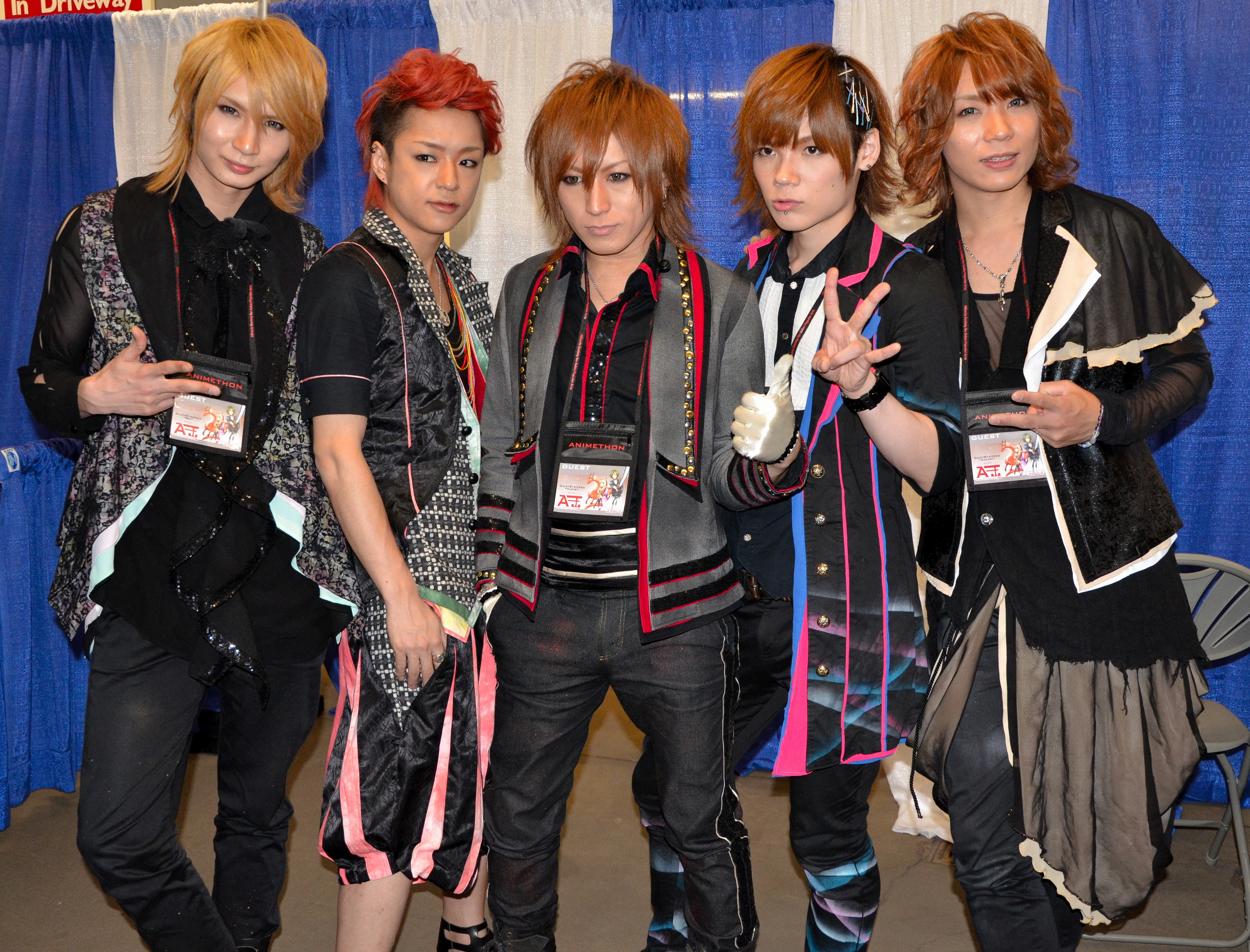
- Daizystripper at Animethon 19 Edmonton, Alberta, Canada

Background information
- Also known as: Frantic Emiry
- Origin: Tokyo, Japan
- Genres: Pop rock; progressive rock; alternative rock
- Years active: 2007–present
- Labels: Marvelous Entertainment; Beyond-Max
- Members: Yugiri; Mayu; Nao; Rei; Kazami
- Website: daizystripper.com

DaizyStripper (デイジーストリッパー, DeijīSutorippā) is a five-member Japanese visual kei rock band that formed in March 2007, and is signed onto the indie label Beyond-Max. DaizyStripper also has an alter-ego band called Frantic Emiry.

== History ==
=== 2007–2009: Formation and indie years ===
DaizyStripper was founded in March 2007 with the line-up of: Yugiri (ex-Altema) on vocals, Mayu (ex-Clavier) on guitar, Nao (ex-Trick) on guitar, Rei (ex-Clavier) on bass, and Kazami (ex-Clavier) on drums. The name DaizyStripper combines the innocence and eroticism, with the positive image of youth girlhood (“daisy”) coupling with the exposure of adulthood (“stripper”). They spent three months writing songs and rehearsing, and on June 5 the band had a demonstration live at Takadanobaba Area 10th anniversary event. Their debut live was on June 18 at Shibuya O-West. This led into a string of four lives, starting on June 24 at Liquid Room Abisu and ending on July 16 at Takadanobaba Area. On August 2 DaizyStripper was one of many bands performing in the "Scuber Dive ~Shibuya ga Taihen~" mega-event, they played at Shibuya O-Crest. A little more than two weeks later, on the 18th, the group participated in Guy's Family's sponsored event "Guy's Party Vol.3" at Liquid Room Ebisu. On August 23 the group held their first sponsored event called "SakuranStrip" at Takadanobaba Area. At this live they distributed their one and only self-titled demo CD. The two track demo contained: "Dandelion", which was re-recorded and used as their debut single and "Black Dropper", which was later re-recorded and placed on their first album Birth. "DaizyStripper" was limited to the number of customers that day.

2008 started with two events in January, the first of which was the "J SHOCK '08 New Year's PARTY" on the 20th at Liquid Room Ebisu and the second was the Rk presents37 "Ikemen☆Paradise" on the 31st at Shibuya O-West. On February 13 DaizyStripper released their debut single "Dandelion". It was released in a CD+DVD only format, and allotted to 1,000 copies. This was also only available to purchase at four select Like an Edison stores and at their lives. The single reached No.10 on the indies Oricon charts and has since sold out. As the first press of "Dandelion" sold-out a second press was released on April 16. It shares the same specifics as the first press. The second press was, however, available nationwide in 13 different stores. The single reached No.1 on the indies Oricon charts. "Dandelion" overall reached No.59 on the major charts, where it charted for two weeks. Like its predecessor it has since sold out. Around this time a two consecutive month single release campaign was announced; "Hoshizora to Kimi no Te" was to be released on May 28 and "Juliette no Knife" was to be released on June 25. However, they were cancelled and announced on a two-set CD Cross instead.

May began with the group's part in the hide memorial summit that took place at Ajinomoto Stadium on the 3rd. Their next bout of activity were two events: "Absolute Domain -Zettai Ryouiki-" on the 10th at Nagoya E.L.L and "ON" on the 16th at Holiday Shinjuku. On June 6 the group had their first one-man concert called Stripper's Kingdom at Shibuya Boxx. Four days later they were a part of Ruvie's "Picture's" sponsored event at Shibuya O-West. As previously mentioned their second and third singles were condensed into a single box titled "Cross", released on June 11. This was also a limited release capped to 3,000 copies. The single box reached No.2 on the indies Oricon charts and has since sold out.

In August, DaizyStripper performed their first show outside Japan at Otakon 2008 in Baltimore. In September, their only lives were a part of their "Toumeihan" (東名阪; Tokyo, Nagoya, and Osaka) based solo tour called Cross ~Gekijou Trip / Ryuusei Trip~. An extra date was added at Takadanobaba AREA on September 9. On October 12 preceded the limited release of their fourth single "Truth", which was released on the 15th. Similar to the second pressing of "Dandelion" this was only available through 16 select stores. The single reached No.1 on the indies Oricon charts. A second pressing of their single box "Cross" was released on December 10, along with the official release of the fourth single "Truth". "Cross" overall reached No.49 on the major Oricon charts where it charted for two weeks, while "Truth" overall reached No.35 on the major charts where it charted for three weeks. At the same month, they ended the year with two lives, one on the 17th at Shibuya O-West and the other on the 31st at Yokohama Akarenga Souko 1-goukan 3F Hall.

At early 2009, they performed the series of shows "stylish wave Circuit '09 Haru no Arashi" from March to April. In October, the visual kei event V-Rock Festival '09 was held in Makuhari Messe, bringing 50 bands, including DaizyStripper. The single "Dearest" was released in June, and preceded the solo national tour Beauty Brightness. In November, the mini album The Beauty was released, peaking at 2th position at Oricon Indies. In December, they performed at Akasaka Blitz at the 13th and in the 31th in an event sponsored by ESP.

"Trigger"
Sample of the "Trigger/Stay Gold" single.

"Kiss You"
Sample of the single "Kiss You".

=== 2010–present: Rising popularity ===
On March 3, 2010, DaizyStripper released the single "Harumeku Bokura" and embarked on a national tour from April to May. In August, "Birth" and "Love" were simultaneously released. Later in September, they held Birth or Live? solo live concert in Nihon Seinenkan Hall, Tokyo.

In June 2011, DaizyStripper took on the part of a session band called Blue Planet Japan. They and many other visual kei band members sing and perform charity songs such as "Hitotsudake ~We are The One~" for disaster victims. On June 15, 2011, their 7th single "Kiss You" and June 29, their 3rd album Bless were released. Their 8th single "Tsuki ni Juusei" was released on September 7. In October, their 4th album Siren was released. In November, DaizyStripper held their first-ever overseas tour in Taiwan. On November 2, their 9th single "Setsubō no Freesia" was released and was used as the second ending song for the anime Yu-Gi-Oh! Zexal. It reached number 20 on the Oricon singles chart, their highest ranking so far. Their fourth album, "Air", was released on January 11, 2012. They performed 5×Starz Attack live at Yokohama Blitz on January 21. DaizyStripper performed at Animethon19 in the city of Edmonton, Alberta, Canada on August 11 as part of their 5th Anniversary tour.

In 2012, DaizyStripper covered SID's song "Monochrome no Kiss" for the Counteraction -V-Rock covered Visual Anime songs Compilation- album, featuring covers of visual kei anime songs. The following year, they covered hide's song "Misery" for the Tribute II -Visual Spirits- tribute album, which was released on July 3, 2013.

== Members ==
- Yugiri (夕霧) – vocals
- Mayu (まゆ) – lead guitar
- Nao (なお) – rhythm guitar
- Rei – bass
- Kazami (風弥) – drums & piano

== Discography ==
=== Studio albums ===
- Birth (August 11, 2010)
- Love (August 11, 2010)
- Bless (June 29, 2011)
- Siren (October 5, 2011)
- Air (January 11, 2012)
- Tragus (June 18, 2014)
- Home (January 11, 2017)
- Infinity (March 3, 2020)
- Fujiyama (August 2, 2022)

=== Live albums ===
- Birth or Live? (January 5, 2011)

=== Mini albums ===
- The Beauty (November 4, 2009)
- Humaloid (August 1, 2012)
- Sirius (May 20, 2015)

=== Singles ===
- "Dandelion" (ダンデライオン, Danderaion) (February 13, 2008)
- "Cross" (June 11, 2008)
- "Truth" (October 15, 2008)
- "Dearest" (June 3, 2009)
- "Harumeku Bokura" (春めく僕ら; We're Becoming Spring-Like, March 3, 2010)
- "Kiss You" (June 15, 2011)
- "Tsuki ni Juusei" (月に銃声; Gunshot to the Moon, September 7, 2011)
- "Setsubou no Freesia" (切望のフリージア; The Freesias of Desire, November 2, 2011)
- "Tokyo Horizon-Day&Day-" (東京ホライズン-Day&Day-, December 12, 2012)
- "Stargazer" (May 15, 2013)
- "Missing" (June 12, 2013)
- "Uso to Kagerou" (嘘と陽炎; Heat Waves and Lies, July 17, 2013)
- "HELLO, again" (August 14, 2013)
- "Derringer" (September 25, 2013)
- "Mousou Nikki" (December 11, 2013)
- "G.Z.S.K.K" (May 14, 2014)
- "Arrest" (January 21, 2015)

=== Other singles ===
- "DaizyStripper" (demo) (August 23, 2007)
- "World End" (as Frantic Emiry) (March 3, 2010)
- "Trigger / Stay Gold" (March 25, 2010)
- "White Butterfly ~Last Scene~" (November 24, 2010)

=== DVDs ===
- "Official Fan Site "Kiss" DVD Kaihou Soukangou (会報創刊号; Newsletter, First Issue.)
- "Official Fan Site "Kiss" DVD Kaihou Vol. 2 (会報)
- "Official Fan Site "Kiss" DVD Kaihou Vol. 3 (会報)
- "Official Fan Site "Kiss" DVD Kaihou Vol. 4 (会報)
- "Truth" (Tokuten DVD) (特典; Bonus, October 15, 2008)
- "Dearest" (特典; Tokuten DVD, June 3, 2009)
- "Crosstrip~Live in Takadanobaba Area~" (高田馬場; September 9, 2009)
- "The Beauty Kounyuu Tokuten DVD" (購入特典; Purchase Bonus, November 4, 2009)
- "Japanesque Rock Collectionz Aid DVD "Cure" Vol.4" (November 9, 2009)
- "Japanesque Rock Collectionz Aid DVD "Cure" Vol.5" (November 9, 2009)
- "4D-Box ~Perfect Visual Archive~" (November 24, 2009)
- "Shock Wave -The Movie 01-" (November 26, 2009)
- "Visual kei DVD Magazine Vol.4 -V-Rock Special-" (March 31, 2010)
- "LIVE DVD「SIX BLESS in SHIBUYA-AX」" (August 21, 2011)

=== Compilations ===
- "Yukemuri Dokidoki Natsu Monogatari ~Aiaigasa no Chikai~" (湯けむりドキドキ 夏物語～相合傘の誓い～)
- "Cannonball Vol. 4" (#1 "Dandelion", June 11, 2008)
- "Visualy(zm) the Cure Century" (CD1 No. 2 "endorphin.", July 30, 2008)
- "Shock Edge 2008" (#8 "Brilliant Days.", October 15, 2008)
- "Crush! -90's V-Rock Best Hit Cover Songs-" (#8 "With-you", January 26, 2011)
- "Tribute II -Visual Spirits-" (#6 "Misery", July 3, 2013)
