= Fanatic Crisis =

Japanese visual kei rock band

- Origin: Nagoya, Japan
- Genres: Alternative rock; power pop; post-punk; gothic rock (early)
- Years active: 1992–2005
- Labels: Noir (1994–1997); For Life (1997–1999); Stoic Stone (1999–2005)
- Past members: Tsutomu Ishizuki; Kazuya; Shun; Ryuji; Tatsuya; Tohru

Fanatic Crisis (Japanese: ファナティック・クライシス; stylized as FANATIC◇CRISIS and abbreviated FtC) was a Japanese rock band active from 1992 to 2005.

Six of their singles made the top 10 Oricon Singles Chart for sales, while two of their albums reached the top ten of the Oricon Albums Chart. At their peak in the mid-to-late 1990s, they were considered one of the "Four Heavenly Kings of visual kei" alongside La'cryma Christi, Malice Mizer and Shazna.

== History ==
=== Formation ===
The band was formed in 1992 by Ishizuki, Kazuya, and Ryuji when Ishizuki was 15 years old. In 1993, Shun and Tatsuya joined and they began performing around Nagoya. In 1994, they released their first demo-tape Karma, with Tatsuya on drums. Tatsuya left in 1995 after the release of the EP Taiyou no Toriko. Their lineup solidified in 1995 when Tohru joined on the drums on the single 'Memories in White'. They released their first album Mask and second EP Marble in 1996.

Like many famous bands from the Tōkai region, they were spontaneously called Nagoya kei along with bands like Kuroyume, Rouage, and Laputa. Over time, fans stopped calling them visual kei as they perceived the band didn't like the name. During an interview, Ishizuki explained that the term "visual kei" didn't exist when they formed the band, and it felt like a label that was being put on them by adults, suggesting they were frivolous or unserious. In the same interview, Kazuya said he has grown to appreciate it.

=== Major debut ===
Their major debut came in 1997 with the release of the single "Super Soul". They followed with two albums, One -one for all- and The Lost Innocent. One -one for all- was named one of the top albums from 1989 to 1998 in a 2004 issue of the music magazine Band Yarouze. In 2000, they switched to the Stoic Stone label (from which all subsequent albums were published) and released their sixth record, EAS. Five albums would follow before their last record, 2004's Marvelous+.

=== Disbandment and post-Fanatic Crisis work ===
In 2005, they played their final concert at Tokyo Bay NK Hall. Kazuya joined with Aoi, who was a solo artist, to form the band Bounty in 2007 and they released several singles and one album. In 2011, Shun and Kazuya joined with Zero and Tsukasa (from D'espairsRay) and Ricky (from Dasein) to form the group THE MICRO HEAD 4N'S. Ishizuki left the music industry but returned as a solo artist in 2012.

== Fantastic Circus ==
In 2019, Ishizuku, Shun, and Kazuya came together under the name Fantastic Circus to perform; they did not use their original name as not all the original members were available to reunite. Originally it was meant to be a one-off event, but it went so well they wanted to continue, but COVID-19 put any future events on pause. In 2022, they performed as Fantastic Circus again as part of a 30th Anniversary celebration of the formation of Fanatic Crisis. They followed with an album release, TENSEISM BEST SINGLES [1997-2000], and went on tour in 2023.

== Members ==
=== Lineup 1995 to 2005 ===
- Tsutomu Ishizuki - vocals (1992–2005)
- Ryuji - bass guitar (1992–2005)
- Kazuya - lead guitar (1992–2005)
- Shun - rhythm guitar (1994–2005)
- Tohru - drums (1995–2005)

=== Previous member ===
- Tatsuya - drums (1994–1995)

== Discography ==
- Mask (1996)
- One (One for All) (1998)
- The Lost Innocent (1999)
- EAS (2000)
- Pop (2001)
- 5 (2002)
- Neverland (2003)
- Marvelous+ (2004)
