= Tsutomu Ishizuki =

- Born: 石月努 (Ishizuki Tsutomu); 8 January 1977 (age 49); Ichinomiya, Aichi
- Genres: Rock; gothic rock; pop rock
- Years active: 1992–2005, 2012–present
- Formerly of: Fanatic Crisis
- Website: https://tsutomuishizuki.jp/

Tsutomu Ishizuki (石月努, born in Ichinomiya on January 8, 1977) is a Japanese singer, musician and designer, best known as the lead singer and songwriter of rock band Fanatic Crisis from 1992 to 2005. Two years later, he started working as a designer. In 2012, he returned to music by starting a solo career and in 2019, Ishizuki and the two guitarists from Fanatic Crisis formed the sub-unit Fantastic Circus.

== Career ==
From ages 3 to 13, Ishizuki learned to play violin. He originally wanted to be a manga artist and so went to the same high school as his idol, Akira Toriyama, and studied design. But he abandoned that path when Fanatic Crisis became busy at the same time, although he did design the band's album covers and merchandise.

The first band Ishizuki joined was J'axil. In 1992, he got together with Kazuya and Ryuji to form Fanatic Crisis, initially being the guitarist, switching to vocals at the suggestion of the members. After gaining popularity in the Nagoya region and being part of the emerging Nagoya kei movement, they became successful in mid-1997 after being signed to a major record label, being called one of "the four heavenly kings of visual kei" alongside Shazna, La'cryma Christi and Malice Mizer. They became popular for the pop fashion styles envisioned by Ishizuki, but disbanded in 2005. Famous Fanatic Crisis songs that were written by the vocalist include "Hinotori", "Sleeper" and "Maybe true".

Two years after Fanatic Crisis disbanded, he started working primarily as a jewelry designer, but also working in other areas of design such as fashion, architecture and art. He also composed some music for projects around this time, such as "evergreen Inochi no Utagoe" for the Japanese Red Cross.

In 2012, he returned to music starting a solo career. His first solo work was the DVD single "365 no Kiseki", limited to 2,106 copies which sold out. It was followed by the single "I.S./Gin no Ame." in October. When asked why he returned to music, he says that the Tohoku earthquake and tsunami in 2011 touched him and he decided to go back to making music to express his feelings. On December 5, he released the EP Drop, which peaked at number 18 on Oricon chart and peaked at number 1 on Usen chart. In January 2013 he played his first solo concert at Shibuya Public Hall. Ishizuki said that he chose this venue because it was where Fanatic Crisis held their last concert as an independent band. His debut studio album Pteranosaurus was released on June 5, 2013, and was followed by the acoustic album Unproud on August 4.

Ishizuki produced the event "vVS1.2015 ~Kinema Club no Hen~" held in Tokyo on May 3, 2015, with Merry as a special guest. In January 2016 he released a greatest hits album called Best Works 2012–2015 [Episode 1]. Two years later, he released Best Works 2016–2018 [Episode 2]. On August 13, 2018, he released the album Songman in collaboration with musicians like Kiyoshi (ex. hide with Spread Beaver) and Casper. On December 2, the singer participated in the Hope And Live support event for people with the HIV virus. The EP Sōseiki was released on May 1, 2019.

In 2019, Ishizuki and guitarists Kazuya and Shun reunited for a concert on November 9, forming a sub-unit of Fanatic Crisis, named Fantastic Circus. The trio announced the album Teinseism, released in March 2023 containing famous songs from Fanatic Crisis.

Ishizuki released the autobiographical album Yagiza no Mori on April 7, 2020. Released the album Ten on November 7, 2022, where the song "Prayboy" was composed by Kazuya.

== Personal life ==
Tsutomu Ishizuki was born in Ichinomiya, Aichi on January 8, 1977, son of a veterinarian. He studied at Okoshi Technical High School.

== Discography ==
Studio albums

- Pteranosaurus (プテラノサウルス, June 5, 2013)
- Bokutachi wa Jikan wo Tomete Koi o Suru. (僕達は時間を止めて恋をする。, October 11, 2014)
- Rēzondētoru no Hanataba (レーゾンデートルの花束, July 7, 2017)
- Songman (August 13, 2018)
- Safari World (August 13, 2019)
- Yagiza no Mori (山羊座の森, April 7, 2020)
- World's End (September 19, 2020)
- Shinsekai – World's Introduction (November 30, 2020)
- Folkroar (September 30, 2021)
- Ten (November 7, 2022)

EPs

- Drop (December 5, 2012)
- Unproud (August 14, 2013)
- Wonderfall ~Love Songs~ (May 25, 2016)
- Wonderfall ~Hyakkiyakō~ (June 29, 2016)
- Wonderfall ~Life~ (July 27, 2016)
- Unproud II (November 16, 2016)
- Unproud III (November 1, 2017)
- Sōseiki (May 1, 2019)
- Unproud IV (June 30, 2021)

Singles

- "IS/Gin no Ame."
- "My Way/I Believe"
- "Ame nochi, kimi ga saku. / Shang-Hi-Baby"
- "White Disc"
- "Black Disc"
- "Runway to the Future/Tabooooo"
- "Wonderfall"
- "Taisetsuna Kimi ni Okuru Uta" (大切な君に贈る唄)
- "Seika"
- "Kaisō Ressha" (回想列車)
- "ReGeneration"
- "Lost"
- "Stars"
- "Sōseiki"
- "Overdose"
