= List of Trinity Blood episodes =

Cover art for the complete series collection as released in North America by Funimation

Trinity Blood is an anime series of twenty-four episodes produced by Gonzo based on a series of light novels of the same name by Sunao Yoshida. Directed by Tomohiro Hirata, it features character designs by Atsuko Nakajima and music by Takahito Eguchi. In a post-apocalyptic future, the series' main character, Abel Nightroad, a vampire feeding on the blood of other vampires, protects humanity in service of the Vatican. The series premiered on the Japanese satellite network Wowow from April 28 through October 6, 2005, and was first released on DVD from August 26, 2005, through July 28, 2006.

After producing an English dub for the series, Funimation Entertainment promoted it in the United States by combining the first four episodes into a 90-minute film named Trinity Blood: Genesis and showed it in select theaters starting on May 5, 2006. The series then premiered in English-language on the Canadian digital station Razer from July 6 through December 14, 2006. On DVD, Funimation's English adaptation was first made available in North America from September 26, 2006, through April 24, 2007, in Australia and New Zealand from December 6, 2006, to July 18, 2007, and in Europe from July 2, 2007, through May 26, 2008.

"Dress (Bloody Trinity Mix)" (ドレス(BLOODY TRINITY MIX)) performed by Buck-Tick, written by Atsushi Sakurai, and composed by Hidehiko Hoshino, serves as the opening theme song for the series. Ending theme songs are "Broken Wings" and, for the final episode, "TB No. 45 Resolution", both performed by Tomoko Tane who also wrote the songs' lyrics.

== Episodes ==
No.	Title	Directed by	Written by	Storyboarded by	Animation directed by	Original release date	English air date
1	"Flight Night"	Hiroyuki Tsuchiya	Atsuhiro Tomioka	Tomohiro Hirata	Atsuko Nakajima	April 28, 2005	July 6, 2006
Father Abel Nightroad is aboard the airship Tristan when it is hijacked by a vampire, Count Alfred Meinz, who intends to crash the airship into the Vatican. Vatican officials realize what has happened and Cardinal Francesco di Medici orders for a missile to be targeted at the airship. Meanwhile, Abel is able to regain control of the Tristan using his knowledge of Lost Technology. Jessica Lang, a stewardess with flying experience, is tasked with piloting the airship while Abel confronts Meinz. The battle between the two takes them to the top of the airship, where Abel reveals that he is a Crusnik, a vampire that feeds on the blood of other vampires; he is then able to defeat Meinz with ease while in his new form. Meanwhile, Father Tres Iqus arrives in a Vatican airship and shoots down the missile which had been fired earlier.
2	"Witch Hunt"	Takahiro Harada	Atsuhiro Tomioka	Masashi Kojima	Takahiro Tanaka	May 5, 2005	July 13, 2006
Fathers Abel and Tres are tasked with investigating the murders of several vampires. They encounter a young girl named Elis Wasmayer who possesses psychic powers, including the ability to manipulate the minds of other people. Elis is taken into custody, although she later attempts to escape; Abel refuses to allow her to be killed after she is stopped, causing Tres to target him as a traitor. After a shootout, during which Abel temporarily disables Tres, Elis is kidnapped by vampires, prompting Abel to attempt to rescue her. A reactivated Tres locates the vampire lair and manages to dispatch a group of vampires while Abel deals with the ringleader of the kidnapping group with his Crusnik form. Tres finds Abel and Elis after the fighting and claims he cannot kill them as he had tied to do previously as he has run out of ammunition. When the trio is then ambushed by the ringleader who was thought to be dead, Tres shoots her, revealing that he had in fact never run out of ammunition.
3	"The Star of Sorrow I. City of Blood"	Daisuke Chiba	Atsuhiro Tomioka	Tetsuhito Saito	Mariko Emori	May 12, 2005	July 20, 2006
Father Abel is sent to Istvan (Budapest), a city ruled by a vampire, Count Gyula Kadar, to find the "Star of Sorrow." Upon his arrival, he meets Sister Esther Blanchett, a troubled nun of whom he learns has killed one of Kadar's lieutenants to avenge the murder of her foster mother. Under the influence of a man named Dietrich von Lohengrin, Esther plans to carry out another assassination. However, Kadar's troops arrive, kill Dietrich, capture Abel and Esther, and proceed to burn down the church in which they were in.
4	"The Star of Sorrow II. Hunter's Banquet"	Hazuki Mizumoto	Atsuhiro Tomioka	Tetsuhito Saito	Toshimitsu Kobayashi	May 19, 2005	July 27, 2006
Father Abel and Sister Esther are taken to Count Kadar and learn that he plans to use a system called the Star of Sorrow to annihilate the humans of Istvan. He informs the two that he carries out his intentions due to what had happened to his former wife, who had loved humans and chose to build the Star of Sorrow to provide energy for them. She was murdered while out in the city aiding humans, thus prompting Kadar's hatred for humans and desire for revenge. However, the three discover that Dietrich, who was also working for Kadar, is alive and has reprogrammed the Star of Sorrow into a weapon of mass destruction in an effort to restart the war between Terrans (humans) and Methuselahs (vampires). Abel manages to destroy the Star of Sorrow through its self-destruct sequence and Kadar kills himself.
5	"Yesterday, Today and Tomorrow"	Shigeru Katō	Kiyoko Yoshimura	Tomohiro Hirata	Tsuneo Ninomiya	May 26, 2005	August 3, 2006
Father Abel takes Sister Esther to the Vatican in Rome, where she can join Cardinal Caterina Sforza's AX unit and be able to train in combat operations. However, Esther soon finds herself lost amidst her unfamiliar surroundings and encounters a young man under a trellis who is crying and feels unable to perform his duties. She gives him encouragement before Father Tres arrives to retrieve her and is surprised to learn that the boy is actually the young Pope Alessandro XVIII.
6	"Sword Dancer"	Masahiro Sekino	Yūji Hosono	Masahiro Sekino	Yukiko Akiyama	June 9, 2005	August 10, 2006
Father Hugue de Watteau is sent to investigate the mass murder of clergymen that took place at a church in Amsterdam. Hugue rescues Sister Agnes, the sole survivor of the attack on the church, from a vampire who attempts to take her away. The two are later captured and brought to a regional vampire whose intention is to use a machine to probe Agnes's memories to find out who is responsible for the murders. Agnes is released after data is extracted from her memories; Hugue, however, is bound and placed in a pit in which he must fight for his life against a werewolf. Agnes, refusing to allow Hugue to die, retrieves his staff and throws it down to him. The regional vampire stabs Agnes in retaliation, which sends Hugue into a murderous rage. After making quick work of the werewolf, he kills all of the vampires in the building. Afterwards, it is revealed Agnes survived her injury.
7	"Never Land"	Mitsuhiro Karato	Kiyoko Yoshimura	Masashi Kojima	Tatsuya Oka	June 16, 2005	August 17, 2006
Former AX member Father Leon Garcia de Asturias is given a shortening of his prison sentence in exchange for his aid on a mission. He joins Father Abel in investigating recent vampire attacks on various ships that were traveling near Albion. The investigation brings the two to Never Land, an island where a Professor Barrie was running an orphanage and illegally converting the orphans into fairy-like vampires through experimentation. Currently, the island is inhabited by only children, who are under the leadership of Wendy and her friend Peter (on whom the experiments failed to work). When Wendy and the other children try to kill Abel and Leon, Peter helps the two but is in turn attacked by Wendy. During the ensuing battle, Leon destroys the Tinkerbell System, which had allowed Wendy to control the other children with her thoughts. When Leon moves to kill Wendy, Peter protects her; it is then that Wendy realizes that she was mistaken in her animosity toward adults. Not wanting the children to be killed, Abel and Leon charter a cargo freighter for them that is bound for Albion.
8	"Silent Noise"	Takeyuki Satohara	Yūji Hosono	Katsuyuki Kodera	Yasuomi Umetsu, Yoon-Joung Kim & Toshihiko Shimada	June 23, 2005	August 24, 2006
Father Abel and Sister Noélle Bor are tasked with investigating the unexplained collapse of the National Palace in Barcelona, only to be told there that the collapse does not seem to be the result of foul-play. They use a break in the investigation to explore the city and enjoy the attractions that it offers; during the course of the day, a drunken Noélle tells Abel that she is in love with him, but he gently rejects her. When the investigation resumes later that evening, Noélle travels to a pharmaceutical company in search of more information; elsewhere, Abel finds the body of Professor Barrie. Isaak Fernand von Kämpfer appears and reveals to Abel the Silent Noise system that was developed by the professor and is capable of destroying entire cities in moments. He then activates the weapon and destroys much of Barcelona. In the devastation, Noélle is killed and, although Abel is able to destroy the system, Isaak escapes.
9	"Overcount I. The Belfry of Downfall"	Daisuke Chiba	Atsuhiro Tomioka	Hidehito Ueda	Hiroaki Karasu	June 30, 2005	August 31, 2006
After losing the papal election, Archbishop Alfonso d'Este returns to Rome for the first time in five years. He brings with him an obelisk and a bell as gifts intended to, in his words, portray the majesty of the city. Meanwhile, Father Abel has returned to Rome and descended into a deep depression over Sister Noélle's death and his perceived failure to protect her. Sister Esther tries to get him to return to the Vatican but fails to do so, and Abel later resigns from his position in the AX unit despite Cardinal Sforza's attempt to persuade him otherwise. The remaining agents suspect that the bell Archbishop d'Este has brought contains a Silent Noise device, but when it is rung during the evening service, nothing happens.
10	"Overcount II. Lucifer's Choice"	Hirotaka Endō	Atsuhiro Tomioka	Takashi Sano	Takahiro Tanaka	July 7, 2005	September 7, 2006
Cardinal Sforza is placed under house arrest for her suspicion of Archbishop d'Este. However, it is soon revealed that the archbishop is in league with the Rosenkreuz Orden, with Isaak working under him. Knowing that he would be suspected, he had the Silent Noise device placed within the obelisk instead of the bell as a preemptive measure. After being informed by Sister Esther that Cardinal Sforza is in danger, Father Abel goes to her aid and confronts Isaak. Meanwhile, the AX unit learns of the true nature of the obelisk and attempts to stop Archbishop d'Este from activating the Silent Noise system. Abel is able to defeat Isaak with his 80% Crusnik form; at the same time, Archbishop d'Este is captured and prevented from destroying Rome. However, due to his vow to never kill again, Abel chooses not to finish off Isaak, who then escapes.
11	"From the Empire"	Hiroyuki Tsuchiya	Kiyoko Yoshimura	Shingo Suzuki	Toshimitsu Kobayashi	July 14, 2005	September 14, 2006
In Venice, Father Abel joins a Methuselah agent from the New Human Empire, Duchess Astharoshe Asran, in a mission to capture the mass murderer, Enderle Kudza. Astha holds a personal grudge against Enderle because he had murdered her former partner; she also carries a great deal of contempt for Terran interference in Empire matters and has no desire to work with Abel. When the two locate Enderle, Astha begins an explosive fight with him that results in the deaths of many Terrans through collateral damage. Enderle escapes and Astha is rescued by Abel, who then collapses due to injuries sustained from the battle. Astha looks after Abel and reveals to him that she deeply regrets the loss of life she had caused. As Astha is about to be deported back to the Empire for her reckless actions, the two realize that Enderle is planning to kill the Pope, who is visiting Venice for a special occasion. Working together, they prevent Enderle from completing his plans and are able to get through his formidable defense system, leading to his defeat. Afterward, Astha thanks Abel for his aid and appears to have developed a more positive attitude toward him.
12	"The Ibelis I. Evening Visitors"	Mitsuhiro Karato	Atsuhiro Tomioka	Tetsuhito Saito	Yukie Sakō	July 21, 2005	September 21, 2006
Rumors of a vampire group planning the assassination of Cardinal Sforza, who is currently on tour in Carthage, arise. An explosion occurs within the complex at which she is staying, followed by an unexpected visit from Ion Fortuna, who reveals that he has arrived as a messenger to deliver an imperial decree from the Empire. Mistaken for an assassin, Ion is injured by Father Tres before being forced to make an escape without delivering his message. Upon Cardinal Sforza's request, Father Abel makes an attempt to locate Ion and arrange for his protection. Meanwhile, Brother Petro Orcini and Sister Paula Souwauski of the Department of Inquisition arrive in Carthage with the intent to locate Ion and deal with the threat to Cardinal Sforza. When Abel locates Ion and his accomplice, Radu Barvon, he finds Sister Esther there confronting the Methuselahs. To her dismay, Abel sternly rebukes her for disobeying his direct order for her to stay out of the matter. As Abel tries to negotiate with Ion and Radu, the Department of Inquisition begins its attack. Abel decides to stall the attacking force so that the others may have a chance to escape; he battles Brother Petro, although he chooses not to fight back seriously and is defeated.
13	"The Ibelis II. Betrayal Blaze"	Ryō Miyata	Atsuhiro Tomioka	Takashi Sano	Masaki Hinata	July 28, 2005	September 28, 2006
Sister Esther, Ion, and Radu continue their attempt to flee from the attacking force. However, Radu reveals that it is he who disrupted Ion's visit to Cardinal Sforza by causing the earlier explosion; he further states that he had always disagreed with Empress Augusta Vradica's notion that Terrans and Methuselahs could coexist peacefully and intends to kill Ion so that his ideals may be heard. After shooting Father Abel, who had returned to the aid of the group on a boat, Radu turns his gun on Ion but is attacked and killed by Sister Paula before being able to kill him. Esther and Ion are able to escape with Abel on the boat, and Brother Petro, who initially jumps onto the craft to confront the three, tags along after being persuaded into allowing Ion to meet with Cardinal Sforza. Sister Paula instills martial law in Carthage and intends for the Department of Inquisition to carry out a rescue operation, believing Brother Petro to have been kidnapped. Meanwhile, Esther treats Ion's injury while he reflects on his memories of Radu. Saddened by the death of his friend and feeling responsible for what had happened, Ion is then comforted by Esther and develops a more positive attitude toward her. Elsewhere, it is revealed that Radu is still alive and in league with Dietrich of the Rosenkreuz Orden.
14	"The Ibelis III. A Mark of Sinner"	Takashi Yamana	Atsuhiro Tomioka	Masashi Kojima	Masumi Fujii	August 4, 2005	October 5, 2006
The airships of the Department of Inquisition that are patrolling the skies suddenly begin to attack the city. Ion decides that the time is right for him to make an attempt to meet with Cardinal Sforza again, calling for a temporary truce between Brother Petro and him. Meanwhile, Dietrich, who is revealed to be controlling the airships, rebukes Radu for his failure to kill Ion and move forward the Rosenkreuz Orden's plan to sever relations between the Vatican and the Empire. As Father Abel, Sister Esther, Brother Petro, and Ion make way for the embassy where Cardinal Sforza is, they are stopped by Radu, who has hijacked a Goliath tank and intends to kill Ion with it and make his death seem like the result of Terran actions. He fires on the group and severely injures Brother Petro and Ion. Moving to protect his companions, Abel flies into a fit of rage, activating his 80% Crusnik mode and feeding on Ion's spilled blood. Abel destroys the Goliath, killing Radu in the process, and appears to be heading for Ion to feed on the rest of his blood when Esther pleas for him to stay away, helping him to come back to his senses.
15	"The Night Lords I. The Return of Envoy"	Daisuke Chiba	Kiyoko Yoshimura	Tetsuhito Saito	Shingo Suzuki	August 11, 2005	October 12, 2006
Father Abel and Sister Esther accompany Ion back to Byzantium, the capital of the New Human Empire. There, the three go to meet with Ion's grandmother, Duchess Mirka Fortuna of Moldova, at her mansion to arrange for a meeting with the Empress. They arrive at the mansion only to find everyone inside dead, including Duchess Fortuna, and Auto-Jägers, undead soldiers with vampire-like abilities, of the Rosenkreuz Orden in wait. After the minions are defeated, the three are confronted outside by personal soldiers of the Empress led by Lord Baibars, who believes that Ion is the one who murdered Duchess Fortuna. They make an escape and find refuge at Duchess Astha's mansion.
16	"The Night Lords II. Twilight of the Capital"	Hiroyuki Tsuchiya	Kiyoko Yoshimura	Takashi Sano	Takahiro Tanaka	August 18, 2005	October 19, 2006
Father Abel and Duchess Astha head to the imperial palace to attend a conference during which they may have a chance to appeal to Empress Vradica directly and clear Ion's name. There, they encounter Sir Süleyman, who explains that the murder of Duchess Fortuna may become an international issue, given that it is believed that Vatican officials are responsible for her death. Meanwhile, Ion and Sister Esther travel through the city in search of Mimal, a former servant of Duchess Fortuna; when they become lost, they request aid from a young girl named Seth Nightroad. When Ion and Esther reach their destination, however, they find an Auto-Jäger hovering over a severely wounded Mimal. Ion is able to defeat the Auto-Jäger and attends to Mimal, who reveals that it is Radu who had murdered Duchess Fortuna before he passes away from his injuries. The Auto-Jäger which was thought to be dead attacks again, wounding Esther before being taken out by her. Seth reappears and begins to treat Esther's injuries.
17	"The Night Lords III. The Island of her Darling Children"	Hazuki Mizumoto	Kiyoko Yoshimura	Masashi Kojima	Toshimitsu Kobayashi	August 25, 2005	October 26, 2006
While Sister Esther is recovering from her injuries, Ion encounters a still-living Radu, who reveals that he plans to assassinate Empress Vradica. He then taunts Ion by mentioning that Esther's family was murdered by a Methuselah and that she may not be sincere in her friendliness toward him. Before Radu can continue, however, Father Abel and Duchess Astha arrive and chase him off. As Abel ensures that Esther is safe, it is hinted that Seth may be more than just an ordinary girl. Later that evening, Ion confronts Esther about her past and questions her true intentions before leaving to locate Radu and stop him himself. Esther attempts to find Ion but unexpectedly meets Seth, who is carrying out an investigation of her own, near the Moldova family mausoleum. The two discover that Sir Süleyman is in league with Radu, who is in possession of explosives and plans to use them during Duchess Fortuna's funeral. However, Esther and Seth are found out; the latter chooses to fight with Süleyman so that Esther may explain the situation to Duchess Astha and is last seen falling off of a cliff.
18	"The Night Lords IV. The Palace of Jade"	Mitsuhiro Karato	Kiyoko Yoshimura	Tadashi Abiru	Hiroya Iijima	September 15, 2005	November 2, 2006
Ion contemplates his feelings for Sister Esther before heading to Duchess Fortuna's funeral procession. He recklessly tries to kill Radu but is easily defeated; as Radu moves to deal a killing blow, he unexpectedly stops himself and struggles to inform Ion that the Rosenkreuz Orden is behind everything before returning under what appears to be outside control. Esther arrives and tries to help but is knocked out; she is taken into custody along with Ion after Empress Vradica orders the two to be imprisoned and interrogated. As Father Abel and Duchess Astha make their way to the Moldova mausoleum, an explosion there seemingly kills the Empress. At the palace, Esther and Ion, who are locked in a cell together, make amends with each other before Radu arrives and is revealed to have been long dead by Dietrich, who explains that he had been using Radu's body as a puppet under his control. Before leaving, Dietrich has Radu shoot Ion with a bullet that sends him into a blood lust and then toss Esther a silver sword, intending for the two to kill each other. Ion begs Esther to kill him before he loses control of himself, but she refuses to do so.
19	"The Night Lords V. A Start of Pilgrimage"	Takashi Yamana	Kiyoko Yoshimura	Masahiro Sekino	Yukie Sakō	September 22, 2005	November 9, 2006
Sister Esther offers her blood to Ion, but he stops himself from feeding on her blood and stabs himself with the sword to regain control of himself. He then moves to kill himself to protect Esther; however, before he can deal the blow, Father Abel arrives, shoots the sword from his hand, and releases the two, showing that he has an antidote for Ion. When Esther, Ion, and Duchess Astha confront Sir Süleyman about his traitorous actions, Empress Vradica herself makes an appearance alongside Duchess Fortuna, who had not died and been acting as a stand in for the Empress. After revealing herself to be Seth, the Empress is fired upon by Süleyman, who deliberately misses because he cannot bring himself to kill her and is simultaneously dealt a fatal blow by Astha. Elsewhere, Abel confronts the Radu puppet but collapses after trying to activate his 80% Crusnik mode, having not fed on any vampire blood. Seth arrives and uses her own Crusnik form to defeat the puppet and save Abel. Later, Esther prepares to leave for Rome with Abel, promising to see Ion again sometime in the future, while Abel learns that Cain Nightroad is still alive.
20	"The Throne of Roses I. Kingdom of the North"	Hiroyuki Tsuchiya	Kiyoko Yoshimura	Masashi Kojima	Masumi Fujii	September 29, 2005	November 16, 2006
Queen Brigitte II of Albion dies with no successor to take her place, leading to the possibility that a foreign power may take hold of the kingdom. Wanting to maintain equilibrium amongst the world powers, the Vatican sends Pope Alessandro XVIII, along with Sister Esther, to Albion, which in turn seeks to strengthen its ties with the Vatican. Colonel Mary Spencer and Count Virgil Walsh give Esther and the Pope a tour of the Ghetto, which lies underneath Londinium, the capital city of Albion. There, the advanced technology of Albion is created solely by the work of Methuselahs, who live peacefully with but isolated from the Terrans above them. During the tour, Virgil's sister, Vanessa Walsh, attempts to kidnap the Pope, who escapes with help from Esther. When she learns of what has happened, Cardinal Sforza asks Brother Petro and Sister Paula to assist Fathers Abel, Leon, and William Walter Wordsworth in finding and protecting Pope Alessandro XVIII, fearing that Cardinal Medici, who refuses to negotiate with vampires, will let him be killed and become a martyr.
21	"The Throne of Roses II. The Refuge"	Yūji Kanzaki	Kiyoko Yoshimura	Takashi Sano	Yoshitsugu Hatano	October 6, 2005	November 23, 2006
Colonel Spencer and Virgil discuss the situation revolving around the Methuselah rebellion. Meanwhile, the AX agents and Inquisitorial members have entered the Ghetto and begin their search for Pope Alessandro XVIII, who has become separated from Sister Esther and is alone. He finds himself in the residential area of the underground Methuselah city and, after fainting at the sight of a young girl named Angelica, is cared for by her and other vampires who are not a part of the rebellion and learns more about the situation of the Methuselahs in the city. Meanwhile, Esther is caught by Dietrich while searching for the Pope; he reveals that he has been preparing for the coming arrival of an angel and takes his leave. Angelica helps Pope Alessandro XVIII to gain confidence in himself and then shows him her 'secret place' that she had found earlier by accident, but Vanessa finds him there and captures him. Father Leon overhears that the Pope has been captured and is then aided by Peter and Wendy, who appear and reveal to him the whereabouts of the rebels' base. He starts to leave them for the location, but he returns to save them after they are attacked by some of Dietrich's Auto-Jägers. One goes after Esther as well, but Abel saves her and sends her back above ground.
22	"The Throne of Roses III. Lord of Abyss"	Daisuke Chiba	Kiyoko Yoshimura	Masahiro Sekino	Takahiro Tanaka	October 13, 2005	November 30, 2006
Pope Alessandro XVIII reveals to Vanessa that he had not realized the plight of the Methuselahs and wishes to learn more about them. However, Brother Petro and Sister Paula arrive and confront Vanessa. As Brother Petro moves to kill her, Pope Alessandro XVIII begs him to spare her life and states that the Methuselahs are only fighting as a last resort in a city that has kept them captive for years. An understanding Brother Petro abides by the Pope's orders and leaves with him and Sister Paula. Vanessa returns to Virgil, who denounces the rebellion and tells her that they can place their hopes in a new generation, one that can see the animosity between Terrans and Methuselahs dissolved. At the same time, more Auto-Jägers begin attacking the underground city while Dietrich carries out his own task; some of them go after the Pope. Sister Paula stays behind to stall a wave of Auto-Jägers, but more of them arrive and surround Brother Petro and the Pope, who are saved by Vanessa. Meanwhile, Cain makes his appearance and attacks the palace at which Sister Esther is staying before descending underground. Father Abel confronts Dietrich and defeats him with his 80% Crusnik form before Cain arrives at their location and unexpectedly kills Dietrich himself. Abel quickly attacks Cain but sees Esther, who had followed Cain underground, and hesitates, thus allowing Cain to deal him a fatal blow and kill him.
23	"The Crown of Thorns I. City in the Mist"	Mitsuhiro Karato	Kiyoko Yoshimura	Katsuyuki Kodera	Toshimitsu Kobayashi	October 20, 2005	December 7, 2006
Sister Esther mourns over and blames herself for the death of Father Abel. Cardinal Sforza goes to Lilith Sahl's coffin and takes from it a vial containing a green liquid, which she gives to Father Tres, who then leaves on an airship bound for Londinium. Virgil seals the Ghetto to protect its residents and an old spacecraft from the Rosenkreuz Orden and then leaves to find a "star." Meanwhile, Isaak arrives over Londinium in an airship and begins to decimate the city as Cain makes plans to merge with Abel's body. Virgil goes to the church where Abel's body is and informs Esther that she is the true heir to the throne of Albion, the secret daughter of Queen Brigitte II's assassinated son. Although she at first continues to believe herself to be unable to do anything, Esther eventually musters her strength and moves to calm a mob outside the palace; it is revealed that Esther is the "Star of Hope" who will lead the people as the next queen of Albion. Elsewhere, Fathers Leon, William, and Hugue attempt to destroy Isaak's airship, but its defenses prove too strong for them to overcome, even withstanding a blast from the Iron Maiden after Sister Kate Scott arrives and has the airship open fire.
24	"The Crown of Thorns II. The Lord of Oath"	Takahiro Harada	Kiyoko Yoshimura	Tomohiro Hirata	Atsuko Nakajima	October 27, 2005	December 14, 2006
The AX agents, Brother Petro, Sister Paula, and Vanessa coordinate their efforts to use a flaw in the shield surrounding Isaak's airship to shatter it, allowing the Iron Maiden to fire upon the airship, bringing it down though destroying a large part of the city as well. Sister Esther returns to Father Abel's coffin to find Father Tres pouring the contents of the vial he was given earlier into it. Cain then arrives and easily defeats Tres before moving to merge with Abel's body. Before he can do so, however, Abel is revived in his 100% Crusnik form and begins battle outside the church with him, who also activates his Crusnik form. As the two battle, Abel remembers Cain as he used to be when they were younger. The fight ends in a draw after they simultaneously knock each other out of the sky as the sun rises. At a later time, Esther is crowned queen of the Kingdom of Albion and blessed by Pope Alessandro XVIII. Together, they pray for a new world in which all people can live together peacefully. Elsewhere, Abel, joined by Ion, quietly leaves to continue his quest to locate Cain and destroy him at all costs.

== Home media release ==
=== Japanese ===
The series was originally released in Japan (Region 2) on August 26, 2005, and spanned twelve DVD volumes; the final volume was released on July 28, 2006. Each volume contains two episodes on a single disk and was made available in both regular and collector's editions. The regular editions include some extras, usually trailers and a booklet. The collector's editions come in higher-end packaging and contain more extras, including deluxe booklets with character profiles and tarot cards designed by Thores Shibamoto. The first six volumes include special "secret voice" CDs in addition to the extras. The final volume's collector's edition also includes a jigsaw puzzle and postcards designed by Shibamoto. The entire series was released in two DVD box sets, containing 12 episodes each, on November 28 and December 26, 2008.

Original DVD release dates
Ep.	Date
1–2	August 26, 2005
3–4	September 23, 2005
5–6	October 28, 2005
7–8	November 25, 2005
9–10	December 23, 2005
11–12	January 27, 2006
13–14	February 24, 2006
15–16	March 24, 2006
17–18	April 28, 2006
19–20	May 26, 2006
21–22	June 23, 2006
23–24	July 28, 2006
1–12	November 28, 2008
13–24	December 26, 2008

=== English ===
In North America (Region 1), the series was released by Funimation Entertainment across six DVD volumes containing four episodes each, with English and Japanese audio tracks and English subtitles from September 26, 2006, through April 24, 2007. Similar to the release in Japan, each volume was made available in regular and limited edition versions. The regular editions have standard keep case covers, whereas the limited editions come in digipaks with slipcovers. The limited edition of each volume includes insert booklets and tarot cards that showcase original art and additional series information; the first volume's limited edition comes with a series box. Most of the volumes include cultural and historical notes as well. On November 13, 2007, the series was released in a complete box set, which includes tarot cards and four limited edition insert booklets. Six days later, Funimation began re-releasing the individual volumes as part of its value-priced Viridian Collection. On March 23, 2010, the entire series was released in a single Blu-ray collection.

Madman Entertainment released the series in Australia and New Zealand (Region 4) across six four-episode DVD volumes. The first volume, released on December 6, 2006, was also made available with a collector's box that is able to hold all six volumes. Each volume includes English and Japanese audio tracks, English subtitles, textless openings and endings, a digital gallery of the tarot cards that came with the original releases, reversible covers, and booklets. The final volume was released on July 18, 2007, followed by a DVD and Blu-ray box sets of the entire series on June 11, 2008, and March 16, 2011, respectively. In Europe (Region 2), MVM Entertainment released the series on DVD from July 2, 2007, through May 26, 2008, across six four-episode volumes without on-disc extras but including collectible tarot cards. A DVD collection box of the entire series followed on March 30, 2009.

English language DVD release dates by region
Ep.	Region 1	Region 2	Region 4
1–4	September 26, 2006	July 2, 2007	December 6, 2006
5–8	November 7, 2006	September 3, 2007	February 7, 2007
9–12	December 19, 2006	November 5, 2007	March 7, 2007
13–16	January 30, 2007	January 7, 2008	April 4, 2007
17–20	March 13, 2007	March 3, 2008	May 2, 2007
21–24	April 24, 2007	May 26, 2008	July 18, 2007
1–24	November 13, 2007	March 30, 2009	June 11, 2008

== See also ==
- List of Trinity Blood chapters
- List of Trinity Blood characters
- List of Trinity Blood light novels
