= List of Trinity Blood characters =

This is a list of the major characters featured in Trinity Blood; a series of twelve Japanese light novels written by Sunao Yoshida, that has been adapted into both manga and anime series. The characters here have been grouped by their affiliation with the major political powers in the series. In addition to providing a quick view of each character's personality and role in the series, any important differences between the novel, manga, and anime appearances of that character will be noted. All character names are written using the official English spellings.

The primary members of the AX unit, as seen in the Trinity Blood anime adaptation. Top row, starting on the left: Abel Night road, Tres Iques, William Walter Wordsworth, Vaclav Havel, Caterina Sforza. Second Row: Kate Scott, Leon Garcia de Asturias. Third row: Hugue de Watteau. Bottom Row: Noélle Bor, Esther Blanchett

== The Vatican ==
The Vatican stands in Rome as the centre of human existence after the Armageddon. In light of the devastation, people sought refuge and protection in the Church, giving the Vatican responsibility and leadership over the humans. Despite its once supreme authority, humans have begun to put their faith in local leaders and nobles, taking authority away from the Vatican. Despite its weakening hold over the nations, the Vatican still stands as the greatest form of human leadership.

=== Leaders ===
==== Alessandro XVIII ====
Voiced by: Yoshinori Fujita (Japanese); Greg Ayres (English)

His Holiness, Alessandro XVIII, is the 399th Pope of Rome, and the son of the former pope, Gregorio XXX. After the death of his father, Alessandro's siblings made sure he was given the title of Pope over his uncle, Archbishop Alfonso d'Este. Alessandro did not choose the position himself and is a nervous and easily frightened teenager who lacks conviction and self-confidence. He cannot handle shouting, especially when it is directed towards him. Despite him holding the highest position in the Vatican, Alessandro is a puppet ruler who feels unable to make decisions on his own, usually deferring to his older brother's views in important matters.

After being kidnapped, Alessandro must seek refuge with The Methuselah in Albion. This experience opens his eyes and paves the way for him to gain more confidence in himself and his leadership, and to learn that not all Methuselah are evil. Now able to stand up on his own, Alessandro pledges to direct his efforts toward a new world of peaceful coexistence.

==== Francesco di Medici ====
Voiced by: Jūrōta Kosugi (Japanese); John Gremillion (English)

The Duke of Florence, Duke of Tuscany, and a Cardinal of the Vatican, Francesco is a tall and intimidating man. As he is a bastard son, he could not be elected Pope and may harbor some bitterness over it. Using intimidation and loud vocal displays, he frequently attempts to pressure his younger brother to bend to his way of thinking. Harboring a strong hatred for vampires, he frequently clashes with his younger sister, Cardinal Caterina, in her pursuits for negotiation and diplomacy. As the head of the Department of Inquisition, Francesco does not believe in compromise, preferring to respond to situations with violence and force. He has no compunctions about making decisions that might kill innocent bystanders claiming his actions are done "in the name of God", and would gladly sacrifice his brother to further his own cause.

==== Caterina Sforza ====
Voiced by: Takako Honda (Japanese); Lydia Mackay (English)

Cardinal Caterina Sforza (by a historical personality, Caterina Sforza, Lady of Forlì and Imola), the Duchess of Milan, is a strong willed, determined woman who shows no fear and has a strong resolve in anything she believes in. She is the head of the Ministry of Holy Affairs and leads the department's special operations group, the AX Agency.

Caterina first met Abel Nightroad when he saved her from a group of vampires who attempted to kill her by order of the Contra Mundi. After she was safe, he promised that he would always protect humans. They have been close friends ever since. Caterina greatly loves her brother Alessandro, the current Pope, and has shown herself to be willing to die to protect him. Caterina frequently clashes with her other brother, Cardinal Francesco, who abhors the idea of peace with vampires and has little regard for the life of Alessandro.

Despite her past experiences, Caterina strongly believes in the need for peace between humans and vampires. Though discovery of her actions could result in her execution, Caterina secretly works to form diplomatic relations with the Empire, knowing they both have a much more deadly enemy in the Rosenkreuz Orden. She has used the AX Agency towards this goal, including arranging a joint operation that teamed Abel Nightroad with Empire representative Astharoshe Asran to capture a vampire mass murderer at large in Venice.

==== Alfonso d'Este ====
Voiced by: Takashi Taniguchi (Japanese); John Swasey (English)

Archbishop of Cologne, he is uncle to Alessandro XVIII, Francesco and Caterina. After losing the papal elections to his child nephew, his hatred and a desire for revenge caused him to hire the Rosenkreuz Orden to create an ultimate weapon which he could use to destroy Rome and kill his niece and nephews. Unsatisfied with the first test of the Silent Noise machine, he has Isaak Fernand von Kämpfer test on the city of Barcelona. Abel Nightroad and Sister Noélle Bor learn of the plot, but are unable stop it. The machine levels the city and Noélle is killed during the attack. Satisfied with the test, Alfonso d'Este delivers the machine to Rome under the guise of a goodwill reunion with his family. The AX agents, suspicious of his sudden about face in light of recent events, are able to stop the city from being completely destroyed and arrest Alfonso. In the novels, however, he is allowed to escape.

In the novels, it is revealed that his master plan was to purge the church of the unworthy, by destroying Rome. He planned to rebuild the Vatican in Cologne, with a newly appointed clergy chosen personally by him. He later resurfaces in the city of Brno, having convinced many church workers to join his new organization, named "Neue Vatican". Having taken Alessandro hostage, the Archbishop attempts to crown himself as Pope of his "Neue Vatican" but his plans are eventually thwarted by the AX.

==== Antonio Borgia ====
Appears in novels and manga only

Antonio is described as an impressive young man with long hair, and a rather undignified appearance for someone of his position. The Prince of Hispania and a top student of the University of Cologne, Antonio is a genius who received seven doctorates by the age of twenty-three. Being of noble blood, Antonio comes from a powerful family with valuable connections both inside and outside of the Vatican. Although somewhat vain, he appears to be outwardly cheerful at all times, even in the midst of dangerous situations.

When first introduced into the series, Antonio is portrayed as a vain and cowardly individual, even referring to Abel Nightroad as his "bullet shield" while they were under attack. Although the reluctant priest remained unsure of Antonio's intentions throughout the mission, the young nobleman managed to lead their attackers into a devious trap, ironically saving them both. Upon his return to Rome, Abel expressed great surprise when Antonio joined the clergy as a priest.

Despite his young age, Antonio is later seen serving as a Cardinal, as well as the Minister of Vatican Public Relations. While having obtained a high position, he shows an obvious lack of formality when speaking with his fellow church officials, often referring to Caterina as "honey". As a consequence, his behavior is looked down upon by both Caterina and Francesco, both of whom appear to share a certain sense of disgust and intolerance for the younger Cardinal's behavior. He also appears alongside Cardinal Francesco after Radu Barvon's first attack on Carthage, requesting that the church send members from the Inquisitorial Department to assist in the defense of the city.

=== AX Agents ===
AX, short for Arcanum Cella Ex Dono Dei (Latin for Papal State Affairs Special Operations Section), serves as the special division of the Ministry of Holy Affairs. The agents are all elite priests and nuns, trained in different arts of combat, many of whom have special abilities granted to them by lost technologies. The members of the AX unit serve under Cardinal Caterina Sforza, and are often referred to as deputy enforcers. They are often sent to investigate issues relating to or involving vampires.

==== Abel Nightroad ====
Voiced by: Hiroki Tōchi (Japanese); Troy Baker (English) Satoshi Hino (young Abel - ep. 24) Kazuya Ichijō (drama CD)

The main protagonist of the series. On the surface, Abel appears to be a goofy, clumsy, absent-minded, devout, and very compassionate Catholic priest who has bad luck with money and is always hungry. In reality, this surface is a facade for a far more solemn, sober personality, in which his compassion is retained but his other personality traits vanish. Additionally, he is a Crusnik, a vampiric being with extraordinary powers that feed on other vampires. Nearly a millennium in age, Abel was created in 2088 A.D. as one of four test tube babies whose bodies were infused with Crusnik nanomachines by the Mars human colonists. Abel once had a hatred for humanity and joined the Methuselah in the war against humans after Armageddon. This prejudice was presumably the result of an unexplained betrayal by a person or persons dear to him that was mentioned by a holo-recording by Lilith. During the war between the humans and Methuselah, Abel Nightroad killed seven million humans. Lilith's murder by Cain caused him to abandon the war. He spent 900 years mourning in Lilith's crypt at the Vatican until a young Caterina Sforza fled there to escape Methuselah's assassins. Abel, deciding then that it was his task to continue Lilith's work and defend the humans, saved the young Caterina and chose to live on. He joined the AX at its foundation in May 3055 A.D. He is described as looking around 20 years old in the manga (though in the anime, he appears to be closer to his early 30s), and has long silver hair, and blue eyes.

In penance for his earlier sins, Abel now adheres to a strict principle of pacifism and has taken a vow not to kill unless he absolutely must (anime only). Though accepting of his Crusnik form, he will generally only use it as a very last resort. After meeting Esther, he is reluctant to use his Crusnik form in a battle for fear of her seeing it and frightening her, and after she does see it for the first time, Abel is extremely distraught. Later he tells her it is the mark of his sins. Notably, in regards to Esther, in the novels and manga, Abel first reveals his Crusnik form during the Star of Sorrow arc, not long after he meets her, and, in the manga, part of her reasons for joining AX is to find out more about Abel (also in the novels and manga, he is nowhere near as distraught for showing her as in the anime). In the anime and novel, he seems to be oblivious to Esther's romantic feelings for him. Asthe seems to have noticed, though, and calls him a dunce for not being bothered by Ion's affections for Esther. While he mostly responds to her with fatherly affection, when he thought she had been killed, he lost control of himself and went into Crusnik form, seeming to delight in killing the Methuselah Radu who he thought had killed Esther. It is Esther that helps him return to normal. Abel eventually learns from Seth that Lilith's killer and their brother, Cain, is still alive and swears to find and kill him, once and for all. After Abel finds and confronts him, Cain defeats Abel and sends him into a near death state. While Esther mourns at Abel's grave, Cardinal Caterina retrieves the nanomachines from Lilith's body and sends Father Tres to take them to Abel in order to revive him. Tres delivers them to Abel's grave, both reviving him and allowing him to achieve 100% Crusnik fusion without the insanity that manifested in Cain. Immediately afterwards, Cain arrives, and Abel battles him again, but the fight ends in a draw and Abel must continue his quest to destroy his brother, now joined by Ion Fortuna.

In his human form, Abel fights with an inordinately large and powerful revolver loaded with silver bullets. In this form, he also possesses strength and speed that is at least as superior to a Methuselah's as a Methuselah's is to a normal human. He also appears to have a limited regenerative ability and a great deal of physical stamina, enough to be run through or shot several times and continue fighting. With 40% of his Crusnik nanomachines activated, his eyes become red, his lips turn dark blue, his nails turn into claws, his teeth become fangs, and he can make a gigantic red scythe composed of crystallized blood materialize in his hands. This form also sees a marked increase in strength and speed from his human form, and an enhanced regenerative ability which enables him to heal injuries such as stab wounds instantly. At 80% activation, he grows black, feathered wings and he can generate massive amounts of electricity. His speed and strength are again increased, and his regenerative abilities and stamina skyrocket, such that he can lose half his torso, including his heart, without any detrimental effects and regenerate it all seconds later. He can only achieve this form, or higher, if he has fed on vampire blood fairly recently, otherwise there is a risk the nanomachines will be unable to generate sufficient power and cause him to collapse. At 100% activation, he turns into a humanoid creature with dark skin, black bat-like wings, and blue markings that cover his entire body. He also generates more electricity than his 80% form and a second blade forms on the other end of his blood scythe (anime only, his 100% form is not currently achieved in any other media). While in Crusnik form, the blood of Methuselah is drawn to him and goes directly into his body without using his fangs. In the manga it is revealed that the nanomachines also have the ability to activate themselves in situations where Abel is injured. Twice the nanomachines activate themselves; the first occasion is a considerable length of time after Abel is badly wounded during his initial fight with Brother Petros. When this occurs, Abel goes off by himself in an attempt to suppress the activation; only tell-tale signs of the transformation are seen in this case (his eyes begin to change) before he succeeds. The second time is during his second encounter with Pedros. This time, Petros compounds Abel's earlier injury with another, and Abel loses consciousness. The nanomachines respond by activating to 80% and regenerating his wounds, as well as driving him into a maniacal bloodlust. In addition, the nanomachines appear to have at least some level of intelligence; Abel refers to himself as "we" during his aforementioned bloodlust, reverting to the singular "I" only after snapping out of his rampage (manga only).

In the novels, he vows never to fuse to 100%, because it sent Cain into insanity. Also, Cain takes the nanomachines of Lilith, so Abel cannot be revived using her nanomachines. Crusniks are literally immortal, but it takes long for their bodies to fully repair when their heads are severed. If, in that injured state, their nanomachines are taken, they cannot regenerate. In the manga, his scythe can produce a blade on both ends no matter what percentage of nanomachines he has active.

==== Esther Blanchett ====
Voiced by: Mamiko Noto (Japanese); Colleen Clinkenbeard (English)

Born as the legitimate granddaughter of the queen of Albion, she was brought to Istvan shortly after her birth in order to save her from assassins. She is the daughter of the late Prince Gilbert who was assassinated just after she was born. She was saved by Edward White, who was going by the alias Edward Blanchett, who took her to an orphanage in Istvan where she was raised to be a nun by Bishop Laura Vitez, who loved Esther like her own daughter.

Esther meets Abel during an attack on Count Gyula's City Military Police as the leader of a band of rebels called the Partisans who worked to oust Count Gyula's tyranny over Istavan. In the anime after a vampire kills one of the clergy and Bishop Laura is killed in a subsequent church bombing, Esther goes with Abel to Gyula's home to stop his plans and rescue the captured Dietrich. The meeting of Esther and Abel differs between adaptations. In the manga series, Esther meets Abel while smuggling a homemade bomb. In the anime series, much of the Star of Sorrow arc is changed, starting with the meeting which occurs when Esther appears at Gyula's home to escort Abel to Saint Matthias. Esther had also murdered Colonel Lattikar to avenge the earlier murder of Bishop Laura. In the novels, Abel meets in person Esther only when he gets to St. Mathias (though he meets her indirectly via an assassination attempt), and Bishop Vitez is not killed in a bombing but gang raped then murdered after a raid by Gyula's forces. In all versions, she and Abel are captured by Gyula's soldiers and Dietrich is "killed" at the church before it is burnt to the ground. After being captured, Abel and Esther successfully stop Gyula and Dietrich's plans, though the circumstances of their capture and the subsequent battle to stop Gyula differ between versions.

Esther decides to journey to the Vatican with Abel and Tres to try to understand why so many people had to die, who Dietrich really was and his goals, who Abel really is, and what she wants to do with her life. Once they arrive at the Vatican, Esther is accepted into the Ministry of Holy Affairs and becomes a fledgling AX agent. A vivid, star-shaped birthmark adorns her side, marking her as Albion's "Star of Hope". This mark is later revealed to be proof that she is part of the royal family of Albion.

She also develops a strong friendship with Ion Fortuna, even offering to let him feed on her after he's sent into a blood lust by Dietrich. She blames herself for Abel's apparent death and stays by his casket for several days, not once leaving his side until Mary Spencer consolidates her to visit their dying grandmother. In the anime, this was changed to Virgil Walsh, and at first she still refuses to leave, despite learning she is the heiress to the throne, but she hears Abel's voice and it gives her the strength to go. She is also a witness to Abel's revival by Tres and another battle between Abel and Cain. As she watches them battle, she comes to understand that Abel will continue battling Cain for all eternity or until one of them has killed the other, and that he must leave. Realizing she can make a difference in the world, Esther faces her destiny and is crowned Queen of Albion.

In the anime, she has a fairly quiet, timid personality, but is also very emotional. In the novels and manga her personality is drastically different; instead of being quiet, she is fairly gung-ho, opinionated, and is irritated or angered quite easily.

==== Tres Iques ====
Voiced by: Kazuya Nakai (Japanese); Christopher Sabat (English) Hikaru Midorikawa (drama CD)

Created 3036 AD, Father Tres Iqus is one of ten "Killing Doll" mechanical soldiers created by Vatican scientist Professor Gepetto Garibaldi (by two characters: one fictional, Mister Geppetto, woodcarver of Pinocchio; and one historical, Giuseppe Garibaldi) in an attempted rebellion. Because his cyborg body is composed of both organic and mechanical parts, he must take vitamins to maintain it. Tres, unit HC-IIIX, is the only one of the units known to still be operational. In the manga, it is revealed that Abel was sent to stop Garibaldi's rebellion, and that he destroyed Tres's "brothers". When Tres, as the last operational model, attacked Abel, he was mortally injured by him. However, he was saved from destruction and recruited for AX by Cardinal Caterina Sforza, where he now has the code name Gunslinger. In Reborn on the Mars, it is revealed that his full name is Hercules Treq Iques; however, he rarely uses it and is known primarily by Tres Iques.

Being a battle cyborg, Tres works with an unemotional, relentless efficiency and his functions are mostly limited to combat situations. He tends to use expressions much like a computer might, such as asking for a "status report" to assess someone's physical status and responding to questions with "negative" or "positive". Despite his mechanical nature, he has had moments where he appears to display concern for others, a sense of humor, and annoyance. Tres is also extremely loyal to Caterina, and Abel remarks that Tres always appears to be in a bad mood when traveling because half of him is always home in Rome. To that end, he is often extremely inflexible with his orders and often carries them out without regard to situational variances. In the novels, when AX is dissolved, he joins the Rosenkreuz Orden with Caterina.

In the anime, Tres' style of combat is best described as gun fu. A good example of this style would be Christian Bale's character, John Preston, in the film Equilibrium, and many fight scenes in films of the heroic bloodshed action subgenre (an example is John Woo's work with Chow Yun-fat). He wields slightly modified dual Beretta 92s (the same gun Preston uses in Equilibrium), and his first combat scene against multiple vampires strongly resembles that of Equilibrium's, in which Preston kills many enemies in a pitch-black room. The reload mechanism for their pistols (a spring catch hidden in the sleeve) is also identical.

==== Kate Scott ====
Voiced by: Hitomi Nabatame (Japanese); Gwendolyn Lau (English)

Originally from Albion, Sister Kate is the holographic captain of the AX battleship the Iron Maiden, and later the Iron Maiden II. Kate also oversees most of the AX missions from within the ship, coordinating the agents moves and relaying information via the earpieces all of the agents wear. Kate is also skilled in making herbal tea blends which are well loved by the AX agents and Cardinal Caterina.

Kate, whose real body is comatose, is able to project herself in various places with the help of her long-time friend Professor Wordsworth and his inventions. The novels suggest that Susan von Scorzeny, an androgynous female pilot for the Rosenkreuz Orden known as the Red Baroness, caused the accident at the University of Rome that resulted in Kate's condition. Kate originally met Cardinal Caterina in college, and she was one of the founding members of the AX.

In the original novels, Kate is described as being an "elderly nun with a mole on her cheek" with a pleasant, comforting personality with a smile that "could calm a raging bull." In the anime series, however, Kate is given a more youthful appearance, and a stronger, no-nonsense personality.

==== Hugue de Watteau ====
Voiced by: Shinya Kitade (Japanese); John Burgmeier (English)

Born in 3032 AD in Antwerp of the Four City-States Alliance, Hugue is the sole survivor of the Watteau family, a paramilitary clan whose clansmen kept the position of Chief Inspector for the Four-City Alliance. Hugue is driven by the desire to avenge his clan after the large-scale attack on their home by vampires.[1] The only survivor of his family's murder aside from himself is his sister Anais (or Ana), but she is missing and presumed to have been taken away by the murderers. Despite his position in the AX, Hugue will often defy orders and search for his little sister as well as his family's murderer. With his independent nature, he frequently leaves AX at a whim to track down vampires.

Hugue, whose code name is Sword Dancer, wields a blade-staff with both a katana and a wakizashi and has artificial arms that enhance his speed and strength, enabling him to easily match the average vampire in a fight. His analytical skills are far beyond that of the average human, allowing him to kill a vampire without wasting a single movement. On one of his earlier missions in the series, he was sent to investigate the murders of several clergy members by a vampire. After a brief conflict, he killed a vampire who was trying to capture the sole survivor, a nun named Sister Agnes (in the novel it is revealed she belonged to the Watteau clan, making her Hugue's distant cousin). While resting at the church, Hugue and Agnes are captured by the servants of the area's leading vampire, Count Karel van der Verf. The vampire plans to execute him, chaining the priest in a pit and forcing him to fight a Werewolf (note the werewolf makes no appearance in the novels). In the anime, Hugue appears to be losing until Sister Agnes retrieves his weapon and returns it to him. In the novel he does not fight a werewolf, but Agnes returns his weapon to him just the same. Count Karel stabs her for her actions, badly wounding her, which enrages Hugue. In the anime, after quickly slaughtering the werewolf, Hugue kills Karel and the rest of the area's vampires who had been watching the fight. Note, in the novels, however, a masked man (most likely Isaak) kills Karel. Father Hugue later appears to deliver the Rosenkreuz Orden's plans to destroy Rome and aided in the battle against Archbishop Alfonso d'Este. He also turned up in Albion to help the Vatican's forces in destroying Isaac's ship. His appearance during the Silent Noise arc, is only in the Anime.

In the original novel, it is revealed that Hugue's childhood friend, Jan van Maylen, employed the vampires to destroy his clan. Jan came from a third-class noble family and desired the job as Chief Inspector of the Four City Alliance, a position long held by the men of the Watteau Clan. Hugue finds him, but spares his life, asking him to come to the church where they first met. Instead, Hugue finds his former lover and Jan's current wife, Rachel. She attempts to dissuade him from killing her husband but fails. Before leaving, Hugue confronts Memlink of the Count Four, the vampire who had framed Karel for the attack on the church in Amsterdam. Memlink attempts to kill Jan, believing that he had intended for Hugue to kill him at church, but is killed by Hugue. Jan begs his old friend for forgiveness, but Hugue refuses, vowing that he would return to carry out his vengeance after he has finished killing the remaining two Counts, Gie and Darsus.

Hugue makes a brief appearance in the manga and helps Ion rescue Esther and Abel from vampire pirates.

==== Vaclav Havel ====
Voiced by: Fumihiko Tachiki (Japanese); Chuck Huber (English)

Born 3021 AD in Bohemia, Havel originally worked with the Inquisition Bureau. After leaving his position, he became Caterina's personal bodyguard, and he later was one of the founding members of the AX. Codenamed "Know Faith", much of Vaclav's body has been replaced with mechanical parts and appears to be capable of flight. He has also been implanted with a system that gives him the ability to camouflage himself. As such, he is one of the most powerful AX Agents, and holds the highest rank under Cardinal Caterina. He is also one of Caterina's most trusted friends, having known her for over 10 years. After Noélle's death, he is the only one Caterina seems to be able to cry in front of. Havel spends most of his time at Caterina's side, though he does occasionally go on missions like the other members of the AX, and is the most trusted with important matters.

In the novels, during the Bohemia War, he calls himself the "Unbeliever". Although he was often considered to be one of the most religious men in the AX unit, Father Havel began to doubt his faith after seeing so much suffering in the world. Some time after losing his belief in God, Father Havel joined the Neue Vatican, and became one of Alphonso d'Este's followers. He kidnaps the Pope, resulting in a conflict with his former comrades. Although Abel tries to convince him to return to the AX, he turns him down. Hearing that the Inquisition forces plan on killing all within the city, an injured Havel attempts to stop them, but is subsequently killed by Sister Paula. Before he dies, the priest admits that he had found his faith once again. The events in the Anime prove ironic, as Václav Havel personally participated in the arrest of Archbishop Alfonso d'Este.

==== William Walter Wordsworth ====
Voiced by: Tōru Ōkawa (Japanese); Jason Douglas (English)

Known by the nickname The Professor. Born 3023 AD in Albion, William Walter Wordsworth was one of the four great prodigies of the University of Londinium, along with Gepetto Garibaldi, Catherina Lange, and Isaac Butler. Framed by Isaac Butler, he was charged for a terrible incident that also killed his fiancée, and expelled from the university. He later became a founding member of the AX along with Abel, Vaclav, Kate, and Caterina.

As a member of the AX unit, Father Wordsworth has a number of talents that he utilizes throughout the series. While he occasionally works as a professor at the University of Rome, he finds the students bothersome and prefers not to teach. He is also a noted inventor, even dabbling in lost technologies from time to time. As a result, he often comes up with somewhat bizarre inventions - some of which work well while others end up as spectacular failures with a tendency to blow up. Among his inventions are a flying car equipped with missiles and rocket boosters with a shape that makes it difficult to fly. Although he has made a variety of interesting creations, Father Wordsworth firmly believes that science should never be misused. In addition to his scientific prowess, the professor is also proficient with the use of a sword cane, a talent that is displayed more openly in the original novels.

==== Leon Garcia de Asturias ====
Voiced by: Tsuyoshi Koyama (Japanese); Phil Parsons (English)

Uses the codename Dandelion. Born 3031 AD in Hispania, Leon was once a decorated professional soldier with a penchant for showing off. When he killed his wife and thirty clergymen, he was sentenced to a 1,000 year prison term. He is allowed to leave, however, to assist the AX with their cases. In return for his help, the length of his sentence is reduced by a couple of decades, so long as he survives and returns.

He carries a pendant with a picture of his daughter around his neck at all times, and loves her more than anything in the world, although her current status is unknown. When not working, his prison is actually the Vatican's orphanage. Father Leon fights with sharp chakrams and a bazooka, and specializes in sabotage and guerrilla tactics. He takes great offense at being called an old man, but despite his gruff exterior, Father Leon still shows signs of caring for others, particularly children. He agrees with Abel's idea at the end of the Barrie case in sending the children who had been turned to vampires to Albion instead of executing them.

In the novels and manga adaptations, Father Leon acts like a pervert around women, including Esther Blanchett and Noelle.

==== Noélle Bor ====
Voiced by: Sayaka Ohara (Japanese); Christine Auten (English) Kotono Mitsuishi (drama CD)

Part of the AX personnel, codenamed Mistress, her power is visual empathy, an ability that allows her discern the emotions of others and to clairvoyantly track where people have gone by their empathic residue. She has romantic feelings for Abel. In the anime series, she confessed her feelings while she and Abel were on assignment in Barcelona. Although he receives her confession gracefully, he gently lets her down by telling her he is truly blessed to have such a "special friend". In the novels, she is a retired agent who left the AX due to her unresolved feelings toward Abel. In the novels, she is also shown to have speed and strength beyond that of the average human. She does not appear in the manga series at all.

She was killed in May 3060 A.D. during the destruction wrought by the Silent Noise machine in Barcelona. After her death, Abel is devastated and consumed with guilt about not being able to save her, to the point that he almost quits the AX.

==== Monica Argento ====
Novels/manga only

Known as the Black Widow, Monica Argento is the daughter of a mafia boss, working for the AX. Being a witch, her kind are naturally hated by both humans and vampires. She was forced to join AX after failing to assassinate Caterina Sforza (supposedly for killing someone close to her) and now wears an explosive necklace that keeps her at bay. While she is a nun, she prefers to dress like a priest and enjoys killing. Monica has the ability to phase through matter and to teleport; her primary weapons are a pair of rose daggers.

==== Kaya Syokka ====
Novels only

Given the codename, Gypsy Queen, Sister Kaya is a valuable member of the AX. Known for her loyalty to Caterina and the Church, she despises all vampires and believes that she is doing the right thing by killing them. She is one of the youngest members of the AX, and is first mentioned by Abel, as the leader of the investigation in Barcelona. After Noelle's death, she is placed in charge of recovering the body, and the data that she was able to obtain prior to the destruction of the city. Sister Kaya fights using fans, and aided Father Wordsworth in killing Kaspar von Neumann by burning her to death.

=== The Department of Inquisition ===
The Inquisitorial Department is composed of a group of elite fighters who see themselves as soldiers of God. They carry out the Vatican's will under the orders of Cardinal Francesco. Their first mandate is the elimination of all vampires. The members of the Inquisition are known to resort to extreme methods to carry out their orders, and have clashed with Cardinal Caterina's Deputy Enforcers. It is said that many of the Inquisitors are singled out by the church at a young age, and conditioned to despise anything that goes against the authority and beliefs of the Catholic Church. Because of these violent tendencies, they are also known as the "Fangs of the Church" as mentioned by the AX.

==== Brother Petros Orcini ====
Voiced by: Tetsu Inada (Japanese); J. Paul Slavens (English)

Born 3034 AD, Brother Petros, the Knight of Annihilation, is the head of the Department of Inquisition. He fights with a giant mechanical lance called "The Screamer", and wears extensive, heavy armor. In the anime, his armor is equipped with a jet pack, while in the novels and manga he uses an experimental injection to give him vampire-like agility and speed.

Brother Petros can be thick-headed and violent, with an intense hatred for vampires. When Father Abel Nightroad delayed his pursuit of Ion Fortuna, Brother Petros insisted on fighting Abel and won after Abel slipped and fell from a cliff. Brother Petros has a strong sense of honor and he threatened to kill one of his men who insulted Abel after his apparent death, saying that while misguided, he was still a brother under God. He also is extremely loyal to the Pope, above anyone else, feeling that the Pope is God's representative and that if he does not follow him, he would not be following God. Nor is he above showing reason or compassion, even for a Methuselah, and is seriously wounded trying to protect Ion Fortuna. Though he was a witness to Abel's Crusnik form during a battle with Radu, Petros has never mentioned it or appeared to be bothered by it (anime only, during the manga and novel versions of this incident he was unconscious). In the manga in particular he develops a fairly good working relationship with Abel.

==== Sister Paula Souwauski ====
Voiced by: Yuko Kaida (Japanese); Wendy Powell (English)

Born 3036 AD at Kraków, Sister Paula Souwauski currently serves as the Vice Chief of the Inquisitorial Department, and is Brother Petro's second-in-command. Codenamed "Lady of Death", Paula is an extremely skilled mercenary who has taken many lives in her line of work. She first appears alongside Brother Philippo on a mission to Brno, to stop the machinations of former Archbishop Alphonso d'Este. Believing that all within the city were guilty of heresy, she attempted to activate a missile to destroy them all, but was eventually thwarted by Abel Nightroad and Václav Havel.

Although skilled with a variety of weapons, Paula claims in the novels that her true battle prowess lies in hand-to-hand combat, but she prefers to strike fear into her enemies through the use of weapons. She prefers to use her Moon Blades, two weapons with crescent shaped blades protruding from each side, that can be wielded like knives or thrown like shurikens. Even the Methuselah, Radu Barvon, was unable to detect her presence until she was ready to attack. Despite his enhanced abilities, she was easily able to outmaneuver him. In the anime series, she struck him with what appeared to be a killing blow during the Iblis incident, but Radu survived the wound.

Paula has an unwavering loyalty to the Church and believes that people are either with it or against it. She once stated that her mission was to "kill all heretics, regardless if they be man, woman, or child." Despite her ruthless nature, she is extremely loyal to her superiors, particularly Brother Petro and Cardinal Francesco. Her loyalty to Cardinal Francesco far exceeds that of her loyalty to the Pope, as seen during her mission in Brno when she was willing to let the young Pope die under orders from Francesco.

==== Brother Matthaios ====
Novels and manga only

An ex-mercenary who was involved in many wars before he entered the Church's service. He is known as the Devil of Morocco for his participation in the siege of Morocco. During that battle, he met Father Leon Garcia, against whom he has carried a grudge ever since.

==== Brother Bartholomew ====
Novels and manga only

Born in 3036, he is technically a brother of Tres Iqus, being the second of the ten "Killing Doll" androids created by Geppetto Garibaldi. Whereas Tres was recruited by the AX, Duo Iqus, renamed Brother Bartholomaios, was saved from destruction by the Inquisition department. He wields a large rifle named "Deus Ex Machina." After the Gunmetal Hound incident, his status remains unknown. In the manga he is destroyed by Tres during the Gunmetal Hound incident after calling Tres' memories of Caterina "garbage".

==== Brother Phillipo ====
Novels and manga only

A ruthless member of the Inquisitorial Department, Brother Phillipo was first seen alongside Sister Paula during her mission in Brno. Although short in height, he is surprisingly strong for his size, easily able to match Father Leon in a test of strength. In addition to his physical strength, Phillipo's body contains cells which allow him to conduct a powerful electric current, which allow him to shock an opponent with 300,000 volts of electricity.

== The New Human Empire ==
The New Human Empire, also known either as the Methuselah Empire or the Empire of the True Race, was founded around 800 years prior to the events in the Trinity Blood series. Fleeing from the persecution of the Terrans, the Methuselah were guided to these lands by Empress Vradica. The Empress brought nature back to the lands damaged by the Armageddon, and founded a new Kingdom, which would exist separately from the outside world. The Empire itself, is a vast land surrounded by airborne particles that filter out the ultraviolet radiation so that the Methuselah may move about by day. It is because of this that the Empire appears to be bathed in the evening dusk, even during the day. The capital city of the Empire is Byzantium (otherwise known as Constantinople or Istanbul), which is the home to both the Empress and a large number of Methuselah Aristocracy who serve in the Empress' court.

The Empire is home to both humans and vampires who live in peace together, under the rule of the Empress and her imperial aristocracy. Having existed separate from the outer world, the people of the Empire have developed a culture of their own. Before the Empress, both races are equal, and it is said that she alone may keep the peace. The nobles of the New Human Empire act as feudal lords, and rule over the various lands in the empire. The mortals who live in the Empire may rank anywhere from the servant class to the nobility, and are each given an equal chance to rise to the noble class. They are considered the property of the Empress, and the Methuselah who pledge their loyalty to the Empress are not allowed to harm them.

The Empire is the most technologically advanced nation on earth, with weapons and machines that surpass both the Vatican arsenal and Albion, a nation which manufactures the hardware necessary for the production of technologically advanced machines. In part because of this, the Vatican attempts to remain on good terms with the Empire, which eventually lead to peace talks between the two nations. Because of the current world situation, the end of the Empress' reign would result in chaos which could potentially lead to war with the outside world if not quickly contained.

=== Augusta Vradica (Seth Nightroad) ===
Voiced by: Yuki Matsuoka (Japanese); Hilary Haag (English)

Augusta Vradica is the Empress of the New Human Empire. Styled "Augusta Vradica, the First and Only", Her real name is Seth Nightroad. She is the youngest of the siblings, and the third Crusnik. A member of the Alliance Aerospace Navy, Seth viewed Lilith as a mother figure and holds Abel in great sisterly affection. When Cain was fatally wounded in an accident, she injected him with 100% Crusnik, restoring his life, but changing him for the worse. After he killed Lilith during the war, Seth joined Abel in confronting him and was the one directly responsible for shooting him out of an airlock. As a child, she seemed to have an aversion to Cain for some reason, taking Abel's side during an unexplained argument of theirs and going so far as to shrink somewhat into Lilith in fear when Cain later appeared.

Among the four Crusnik siblings, she has spent the most time with Methuselah, but unlike Abel, she does feed on them. Around 800 years ago, Augusta Vradica led the Methuselah to the lands where the Empire would eventually stand, to save them from persecution. She helped restore nature back to the lands, returning them to their former glory before the Armageddon. She then became the Empress of the New Human Empire, ruling over her kingdom as the heart of the Empire itself. As the Empress, Seth is seen as a mother by her people, and treats her subjects as she would her own children. However, most of her courtiers and servants have never seen her before in all the centuries that they have served her, mainly due to the heavy veils she wears to cover her appearance as well as the use of a voice modifier. Though she does age, she still appears as a little girl, but is well over nine hundred years old. It is implied that she does not wish to declare war on the Vatican territories due to her Abel's desire for peace; sideways comments by her have indicated that she has very little faith that a lasting peace is possible. As his sister, she knows Abel very well, and has commented that he is quite popular with the girls for some unknown reason. Her appearance differs between the manga and anime; she looks like a girl of eight or nine years old in the anime, and in the manga, she claims to be 13 while in disguise and looks somewhat older than that. In both versions she has green eyes, short black hair, and is very small in stature.

During a plot to overthrow her, Seth disguised herself as a tea-seller and a medical student in the human district of the capital city, Byzantium. During that time, she met Ion Fortuna and Sister Esther Blanchett, though neither knew who she was. She later alerted Abel and Asthe when Ion and Esther were in danger, and saved Esther from one of Dietrich's puppets.

When her Crusnik powers are activated at 40%, Seth's eyes turn red, her lips turn greenish-blue, her voice becomes deeper, and a pair of giant tuning forks made of blood materialize in each of her hands. At what was presumably a tell-tale 80% activation, fairy-styled wings grow from her back in addition to her other traits. In this state, she can almost instantly disintegrate her enemies, turning them into a salt-like substance. Her power is being based on a manipulation of ultrasonic sound waves which she calls "The Fire of Sound". She has been shown to have a fondness for random odd jobs; the first time Süleyman saw her she was selling flowers, Esther and Ion meet her as a tea seller, and in one of the omakes Abel runs into her several times doing different jobs including bagging groceries, selling tissues, and working as a waitress. Also, she likes the color green so much that, as the Empress, it is the "Imperial" color and only objects associated with her may display it prominently. In the manga, she also owns a small white squirrel named Abel which is seen accompanying her almost everywhere.

During the events of the Trinity Blood Canon Summa Theologica light novel, Seth was compelled to reactivate the massive spaceship Ark when a nuclear attack ordered by Pope Francesco destroyed the Empire's second largest city. From the capital Byzantium, She attempts to destroy the Vatican's nuclear launch facility using the Ark's powerful satellite cannon. As soon as this system is activated, however, Cain and Dietrich appear and take control of the Ark. Abel also arrives and becomes involved with the confrontation between Seth and Cain. Cain reveals that he seeks to crash the Ark onto the Earth. Seth thwarted this plan by sacrificing herself, and when her strength was spent, Cain killed her and severed her head. After the incident, the Rosenkreuz Orden twists the information and Abel is framed for the murder of Empress Augusta Vradica. This leads the Empire to start an all-out war with the Terrans.

=== Mirka Fortuna ===
Voiced by: Yuri Amano (Japanese); Jennifer Seman (English)

Head of the Imperial Secret Council, the Duchess of Moldova, the Prime Minister of the Empire, and a keeper of Secret History, Mirka Fortuna is known for her cunning and eccentric nature. She is Empress Augusta Vradica's most trusted advisor and friend, being one of the few people in the Empire who knows the Empress' true appearance. Mirka acted as a decoy for the Empress during an assassination plot in order to draw out those behind the plot. Faking her own death, she allowed her grandson, Ion, to be framed for the murder. For some unknown reason, despite her small stature (she is the same size as Seth in the manga) and frivolous mannerisms, most people who know her seem to be frightened of her in a comedic sort of way, including Ion himself. In the anime, Mirka looks more like a full-grown woman.

=== Ion Fortuna ===
Voiced by: Minagawa Junko (Japanese); Aaron Dismuke (English)

Born in 3045 AD, the Earl of Memphis and the Empress's Swords Keeper, Ion Fortuna is very young by Methuselah standards. The grandson of Mirka Fortuna, he is full of pride for both the Empire and his race, and is quite nimble and strong for his age. He is ordered by the Empress to act as an Imperial messenger and envoy to negotiate with the Vatican. Upon his arrival at the Vatican embassy of Carthage where Caterina was staying, the building caught fire, causing the Vatican's agents to believe that he was involved. He fled from Father Tres' gunfire, but was injured by a silver bullet. Abel and Esther established contact with Ion and Radu, and aided their escape through the underground passages beneath the city.

After learning Radu has betrayed him for the Rosenkreuz Orden, Ion is terribly saddened, but finds comfort in Esther's friendship. Initially, Ion holds strong prejudices against Terrans, but after his acquaintance and growing familiarity with Esther, his attitude changes considerably, from the once selfish and human-loathing character seen when he first shows up at the Vatican. Proved when the Puppet Master tries to control him, Ion attempts to commit suicide in order to stop himself from unwillingly killing Esther in a bloodthirsty rage, but is thwarted and saved from this fate by Father Nightroad. Through his experiences with the treachery of the Order, Ion develops a growing desire for vengeance, and eventually joins Abel in his quest to destroy them.

Ion gradually develops a crush on Esther, which later blossoms into a deep, one-sided love. In the anime, he is very shy about these feelings and has a hard time telling her how he feels. In contrast, Ion is able to confess to Esther in the manga version right before he goes to talk to his grandmother (though it is revealed along the way that he still had to muster up a great amount of courage to do so, blushing furiously when looking back on it.). Ion treasures his friendship with Esther, but his trust in her is greatly shaken when Radu reveals Esther's past with the Methuselah. Troubled and feeling betrayed, he accuses Esther of secretly thinking him a monster, which she insists is not true. Ion later regrets his actions, especially when Esther arrived to save him before he is killed by Radu, and is captured along with him. His faith in Esther is completely restored when, in jail, she repeats her statement that he is indeed her friend. After the Dietrich awakens his thirst for blood, Ion immediately begs Esther to kill him whilst barely using his willpower to restrain himself. Esther refuses, and instead gently grants him permission to drink her blood. Shocked, touched, and his heart breaking, Ion reluctantly almost gives in to his hunger; he manages to stop himself right before biting her, and almost takes his life before Abel intervenes to save them. Before Esther leaves the Empire, Ion is troubled when completely realizing the fact that because they are of completely different races, he might never see her again. Astha affirms this by reminding him that time passed differently between Methuselah and Terrans, and whatever he desired to say should be said now. At the last moment, Ion catches up to Esther and declares that they will meet again, earning a smile in return. It is relatively unknown if Esther fully understands or shares Ion's feelings. In the anime, she is rather oblivious to it, though in the manga, when Ion promises to become stronger and repeat his invitation for her to remain with him in the Empire, she smiles and states that she will be waiting for him to do so.

Ion's appearances in the manga and anime have slight differences: In the anime, he simply looks like a young boy, but in the manga, he has more androgynous features.

=== Astharoshe Asran ===
Voiced by: Michiko Neya (Japanese); Carrie Savage (English)

Astharoshe "Astha" Asran, Viscountess of Odessa and Duchess of Kiev, is an undercover agent for the New Human Empire. She is a direct, no-nonsense individual who has a very low opinion of Terrans, referring to them as barbaric and stupid, among other things. Her opinion of humans, however, seems to have primarily been formed through Empire propaganda combined with having little exposure to or understanding of humans. Asthe takes being called a "vampire" as an insulting slur, and only refers to herself as a Methuselah. Astha fights with a weapon called the Spear of Gae Bolg. The most powerful close-combat weapon found among the Lost Technology relics, the spear uses ionized xenon gas to create a high-density, high-temperature plasma blade capable of cutting through anything.

Astha's view of humans begins to change after she is sent to Venice to arrest Endre Kourza, a vampire mass murderer whose newest round of killings in Vatican territory could spur a war. As part of her mission, she is partnered with Father Abel Nightroad from the AX Agency. When the two find Endre, Astha becomes solely focused on killing him because he murdered her partner. She is so blinded by her rage that she destroys the Rialto Bridge, killing and wounding many humans that had come for a festival. Abel also sustains injuries while protecting her from her own sword, which flew back at her in the explosion. She greatly regrets her actions, and keeps a better handle on her emotions when they go after Endre again and arrest him. Though she initially berated Abel for calling himself her partner, a word of special meaning to Astha, at the end of the mission, he earned her respect enough for her to call him her partner. She also became more accepting and tolerating of humans in general. When Ion was framed for the murder of his grandmother, she allowed Abel and his entourage to stay at her estate, and aids Abel in an investigation into the true circumstances of the murder. During the climax of this investigation, she accuses the Duke of Tigris, Süleyman of treason against the Empire, and is forced to kill him after he makes a purposefully unsuccessful attempt on Seth's life. In the manga, she then accompanies Esther to the nuclear launch facility beneath Byzantium. She evidently sees Abel in his 40% Crusnik form, but apparently it does not make any sort of impression on her. She is hit by a fireball when she confronts Radu, and is knocked unconscious, thus she is unaware of both Seth's Crusnik status and her relationship to Abel. She does not appear in this confrontation in the anime.

Her partnership with Abel would become an important step in the secret peace negotiations between the Vatican and the Empire. She would later be assigned to shelter the Vatican diplomats and the Earl of Memphis after the Rosenkreuz Orden's attempt to frame the Earl of Memphis. Through this turn of events, Astha would also become a core Empire representative in the quest to stop the Rosenkreuz Orden's continued efforts to start another war between the Methuselah and Terrans.

In the novels, the partner that Endre killed was the Countess Len Yearnoshe, however in the anime series, her partner is changed to a male and it is implied that they were lovers. In the manga, she owns a very large female tiger named Binas, and cuts her hair short during the conclusion of the Queen of the Night arc because it was singed by a fireball. Her clothing in the manga is much more revealing than in the anime; the portions of her outfit that are absent in the manga are plain white cloth in the anime.

=== Süleyman ===
Voiced by: Takewaka Takuma (Japanese); J. Michael Tatum (English)

The third highest ranking noble in the Empire, Duke of Tigris Süleyman has spent over 300 years of his life serving the Empress. He is the Deputy of the Imperial Secret Council and seems to have known Astharoshe since she was a child and considers himself to be her uncle. After Mirka Fortuna's feigned death, he serves as the Acting-Head of the Imperial Secret Council. In truth, he is the apparent leader of the extremists in the Empire and is part of the plot to assassinate the Empress and the Duchess of Moldova so he can seize the throne. Süleyman controls the ring of Solomon, which is capable of firing deadly blasts of energy. Despite his hatred and disagreement with the desire for peace between humans and Methuselah, when he has a chance to take a shot at the Empress, he cannot bring himself to kill her and intentionally misses. He is killed by Asthe.

=== Baibars ===
Voiced by: Naoya Uchida (Japanese); Bob Carter (English)

Baibars, the Duke of Khartoum, is a gigantic, dark-skinned man who serves as the chief of the Yeniceri, the Empire's Palace guard. A loyal subject of the Empire, he is also the bodyguard of the Empress, and is an aggressive and skilled fighter. He is first seen leading a group of Palace Guards to arrest Ion Fortuna, and later appears to intercept Abel's uninvited excursion into the palace. When Astharoshe Asran and Abel Nightroad sneak into the palace through the catacombs, Baibars and the Yeniceri appear to defeat the Death Hunters sent by Dietrich, allowing the pair to pass safely into the palace. He is introduced as a gruff, dutiful soldier, but after the plot to assassinate the Empress is foiled, he reverts to a much more friendly and easy going personality, as well as revealing that he and all of the Yeniceri are comically terrified of Mirka Fortuna, the Duchess of Moldova. He is currently training Ion in swordsmanship.

=== Enderles Kudza ===
Voiced by: Susumu Chiba (Japanese); Chris Patton (English)

Enderles Kudza, Count of Zagreb, is considered the Empire's worst mass murderer, having impaled over 300 Terrans and relentless slaughtering many others in various ways. Boyish in appearance, Enderles is purely evil and was exiled from the Empire. He formed an association with the Rosenkreuz Orden, with Isaak Fernand von Kämpfer acting as his contact. At the Orden's request, he goes to Venice for the purpose of murdering the Pope, however he goes on another massacre spree, killing dozens, in hopes the Empire would send Asthe after him. Having once killed her partner by using Asthe as a shield, he enjoys tormenting her with that knowledge and repeats the scene by using a child as his shield, then killing the little girl the same way he killed Asthe's partner.

When fighting, Enderles protects himself with an Aegis shield, a series of orbs that forms an impenetrable shield around its wielder. A powerful defense system, the Aegis only weakness is that while activate, the person using it is also unable to attack and must drop the shield to make an offensive move. Asthe, partnered with AX Agent Abel Nightroad, finds Enderles, but he escapes their grasp and Asthe, letting his constant taunting get to her, causes massive casualties among the humans. The pair realize his real purpose for being in Venice, however, and set up a trap for him. Asthe belittled him in order to infuriate him so he will drop his shield and attack her, giving Abel the chance to wound him with a silver bullet. He is arrested, but while he is being transported back to the Empire for his trial, Kämpfer frees him, then kills him.

In the anime series, Enderles name is changed slightly to Enderle Kudza. His appearance is greatly modified, giving him an older, more adult appearance rather than the childlike appearance described in the novels. The more gruesome details of his crimes, particular his multiple murders of children, are also not mentioned, nor does the anime reveal his connection to Rosenkreuz and his death is mentioned as a result of his wounding by Abel Nightroad.

== The Rosenkreuz Orden ==
The Rosenkreuz Orden is a vampire terrorist organization, and its members are the primary antagonists in the Trinity Blood series. The Rosenkreuz Orden is led by the Crusnik Cain, who is also referred to as "Contra Mundi." Preferring to work in the background and keeping their activities secret, they often manipulate unsuspecting humans and vampires into doing their dirty work for them.

The Orden claims to want to make a "new world order," and many of their activities center on triggering a new apocalyptic war between the Vatican, the New Human Empire, and Albion. Given Cain's desire to destroy the world, however, he may be manipulating the entire organization to suit his own personal vendetta.

=== Cain Nightroad ===
Voiced by: Junichi Suwabe (Japanese); Mike McFarland (English) Hirofumi Nojima (young Cain—ep. 24) Kazuya Ichijo (drama CD)

The oldest of the Test Tube Babies, Cain is often seen as Abel's elder twin. He was once the gentle, beloved leader of the Mars Colonization Project, until an accident killed him. Seth injected him with the Crusnik nanomachines which saved his life, but also drove him insane. In the war following the return of the colonialists to Earth, he and Abel took the side of the vampire returners. When Lilith's influence made Abel question their choice, Cain killed her. Furious, Abel and Seth confronted their brother, pushing Cain out of the spaceship and into the atmosphere. His body burned into a pile of ash. Cain was able to regenerate his body from the ash; however, he sometimes has difficulty holding his makeshift body together.

Nine hundred years later, he met Isaak Fernand von Kämpfer. Together, they took over the Rosenkreuz Orden, a small, insignificant organization in Berlin that consisted of enemies of the Vatican. Through Cain and Isaak's charisma and power, the Orden grew into the world's leading terrorist organization. Cain's motivations are unclear, but he seems bent on the destroying humanity and the world. His subjects refer to him as "Mein Herr" which is German for "My Lord" or "Sir." He is also referred to as "Mein Herr Contra Mundi", German for "My Lord Against the World". His most popular title, however, appears to be Contra Mundi. His overall attitude in the anime is one of aloof disconcern.

Once his brother Abel learns Cain is alive, Abel's primary goal becomes to kill Cain once and for all. When Cain leads the Rosenkreuz Orden on an attack of Albion, the two brothers have their first clash and Cain kills Abel with relative ease due to his higher Crusnik fusion level and Esther's sudden appearance, that distracted Abel. Realizing Abel had destroyed the control panels of the rocket, he plans to merge himself with Abel's body to get the access codes from Abel's memory. However, Abel is revived with Lilith's nanomachines thanks to Caterina and Tres. This puts Abel at the same power level as Cain and their next clash ends in a draw. Accompanied by Ion Fortuna, Abel has pledged to hunt Cain for eternity, if need be, until he is destroyed.

In the manga, Cain's personality is drastically different. While mostly demonstrating an almost childlike, carefree nature most of the time, he was also shown at one point yelling in an over-the-top manner at a vendor who, in his opinion, made poor fish and chips. He has a seemingly random encounter with Esther while she is having an uncomfortable and undesired meeting with a reporter in London. During this encounter, she mistakes him for Abel at first due to their similarities in appearance and manner, though he is dressed in a white suit and a white top hat. He follows her around for some time while she attempts to make her way back to the Royal Palace, all the while acting in an even more frivolous and goofy manner than Abel. Finally, Esther runs into Isaak, posing as Mr. Butler, who tells her that he happens to be looking for someone. This someone is revealed to be Cain who, after listening to Esther telling Issak that she is lost, insists on driving her back to the Palace. When Esther asks him for his name, he momentarily adopts a more solemn manner, and tells her that his name is Cain. The situation resolves itself without any incident, with Cain delivering Esther to the Palace safe and sound and then going on his way. In the manga, Cain seems to be very concerned with Abel's well-being for some reason; he shows great happiness when told by Isaak that Abel is well after his confrontation with Dietrich in the Byzantium nuclear launch facility, and during said confrontation, Dietrich mentions that "a certain someone" would be furious if he was to kill Abel. Why Cain shows this concern is not known.

When his Crusnik powers are activated, Cain's lips and eyes turn red, his hands grow blue claws, he grows six white wings, and a black lance materializes in his hands. In this state, he can generate destructive red energy. When not in Crusnik form, he appears to have the power to launch a destructive and invisible force from his hands and to possess superhuman strength. Among the four Crusniks, Cain is the only one who has fused 100% with his nanomachines in the novels, however in the anime Abel also achieves 100% fusion, without the insanity, after being infused with Lilith's nanomachines.

=== Isaak Fernand von Kämpfer ===
Voiced by: Keiji Fujiwara (Japanese); Christopher Ayres (English)

An inventor of the Rosenkreuz Orden, Isaak is also called Panzer Magier. Isaak is the vampire who is responsible for making Cain's current body, which had been permanently damaged by Seth and Abel 900 years ago. Despite his many talents, Isaak is somewhat of a mystery and has gone by many aliases in the past. He used to study at London University under the name of Isaac Butler, and was involved in the incident which killed William's fiancé and led to both to them being expelled. Since he met Cain, Isaak takes care of Cain's regeneration and leads the Orden with him, though his true motivation for doing so is unknown. He enjoys smoking cigarillos and quoting works of literature. Issak does not usually appear in public, preferring to let others carry out his plans. When he does move to the front lines, he shows excellent battle prowess and is not easily defeated. In the manga, he encounters Esther several times in a black suit and top hat, calling himself Mr. Butler. His reasons for appearing to Esther are seemingly always benevolent; he once went so far as to save her from nearly certain death at the hands of Monica Argento, a ruthless AX agent with orders to bring Esther in dead or alive. His reasons for seemingly shepherding Esther are unknown. Also, he appears to maintain a role as Cain's literal butler in this adaptation, deferring to him in a servant-like manner and referring to himself as an "ant" when compared to Cain. Isaak's calm, mysterious nature and tendency to help the AX as much as the Orden is true in the novels as well, even saving Abel from Monica in a similar situation in Rage Against the Moons.

Isaak possesses many talents and is well versed in the use of Lost Technologies. His primary weapon is an attack called the Arrow of Belial, a massive sphere of light that shoots a multitude of electromagnetically accelerated bolts of energy at his opponent. He also possesses the ability to project a nearly impenetrable electromagnetic wall, known as the Shield of Asmodai, around his body. This defense can be utilized at will and is capable of blocking almost any assault. In addition, Isaak created artificial demons that he can summon into battle to aid him. He has two kinds of demons: dwarfs called the "Schatten Kobolds" that appear to be little devils concealing their forms in Kämpfer's shadow, and knomes, monstrous worm-like creatures with the ability to tunnel through the ground at amazing speeds. The latter only appear in the novels. He also employs the use of thin mono-carbon fibers, called the Sword of Beelzebub, which are strong enough to cut through the hardest diamond, thus making for another formidable weapon.

According to the novels, Dietrich von Lohengrin is Isaak's protege and it is probably under his tutelage that Dietrich gained the knowledge to create the Death Hunters. In the anime, Isaak is last seen piloting the Orden's air ship while leading an attack on the city of Londinium in Albion. Through the combined efforts of the Church and the Kingdom of Albion, the ship was destroyed, presumably killing him in the explosion.

=== Dietrich von Lohengrin ===
Voiced by: Kenichi Suzumura (Japanese); Justin Cook (English)

Born 3042, Dietrich joined the Orden at the age of 7, and by the age of 10 he had earned a high-ranking position. Before joining the Orden, he was the son of the Duke of Germanicus. As a child, he was avoided for his unusual intelligence, and his evil nature. It was for this reason that his father tried to kill him. He failed, and Dietrich killed him along with the rest of his family. After slaughtering his family, Dietrich took over as ruler, and continued living in his home. He continued terrorizing the villagers, until the day he met Cain and Isaak, and joined the Rosenkreuz Orden. Dietrich is the only known Terran in the Orden, and believes that his involvement has a great purpose for the world.

He is extremely beautiful and is said to have the face of an angel but the heart of the devil. Known and feared for his extreme sadism, Dietrich seems to view the world and people in it as his personal toys for use to relieve his constant boredom. After meeting Esther Blanchett, he seems to develop a mild obsession with her, delighting in taunting her and calling her names whenever he is around her. That does not stop him from sending Ion into a bloodthirst while he's locked up with Esther in the dungeons below the palace. He then gives Esther the option of dying at Ion's hands or killing Ion to save herself.

Dietrich, also known as the Marionettenspieler (Puppet Master), is the creator of the Order's foot soldiers, which he affectionately refers to as Death Hunters. In the anime these puppets are vampire corpses that are controlled using a lost technology that utilizes thin string-like living fibers transplanted on the skin. Once fused into the nervous system, the fibers send out electrical impulses which allow the "puppeteer" to control his victim's nervous system and senses. In the novels they are undead cyborgs resurrected using lost technology. However, his living fibers' ability to be used on living beings as well is found in both versions; this power forces the person under his control to perform tasks against their will and feel sensations such as pain and sexual stimulation. Despite his skills with Lost Technology, it is said that his most fearsome trait is his ability to play with the hearts of other people.

In the anime series, Dietrich fails to gain control of a rocket during a mission in Albion and Cain kills him for his failure. However, this does not happen in the novels, as Dietrich survives. In the manga, he is threatened with torture after his failure to activate a nuclear weapon underneath Byzantium; evidently not due to said failure but because he mouthed-off to Isaak.

=== Radu Barvon ===
Voiced by: Katsuyuki Konishi (Japanese); Jason Liebrecht (English)

The Baron of Luxor and Ion Fortuna's foster brother, Radu is Ion's most trusted friend and is chosen by the Empress to accompany Ion on a mission to negotiate with the Vatican. The visit is ruined when a terrorist bomb causes the Vatican to believe Ion came to kill Cardinal Caterina, and Father Tres attacks him. Abel and Esther meet with Ion and realize it was Radu who set the bomb and betrayed Ion. As a member of the Orden, Radu was given the orders to kill Ion and Cardinal Caterina, to cause a war between the Empire and the Vatican. Radu appeared to be killed by Sister Paula, but he reappears a short while later injured, but alive. Note, Sister Paula's appearance in the Ibelis arc is only in the anime.

With Dietrich's help, he seizes control of the Inquisitorial Department's weapons and turns them on the city of Carthage. After Radu severely injures Ion and Brother Petro, Abel activates his 80% Crusnik nanomachines, and kills him. Radu's sun-burnt dead body is retrieved and repaired by Dietrich, using artificial blood and skin, turning him into a puppet. Though Radu manages to return to his old self to stop Dietrich from using his body to kill Ion, Dietrich is able to quickly regain control and says Radu is no more. Radu's body is destroyed for good when Seth, in her Crusnik form, disintegrates him.

Radu possesses the unique ability to produce and control blue flames from which he gained the nickname Flammenschwert (flame sword). After he is turned into a puppet, Dietrich gives his blood the ability to burst into flames. Radu's fire production and manipulation abilities are due to his being a rare breed of vampires known as Efreet

In the manga adaptation, Radu appears to be more reluctant in serving the Order, appearing horrified when he finds out about Dietrich's use of vampire corpses in the creation of the "Death Hunters".

=== Helga von Vogelweide ===
Novels only

Helga, codenamed Eishexe ("Ice Witch"), holds dominion over cold and ice using the Winter Maiden staff created by Isaak. She is a highly ranked member of the Rosenkreuz, having the same rank as Dietrich von Lohengrin. Helga is in love with Cain and becomes jealous over Isaak's "monopolizing" him. She conspires with the Neumann brothers to kill Isaak and Dietrich and seize their power, but Isaak learns of the plans and kills her.

=== Balthasar von Neumann ===
A Methuselah, whose father was apparently a human, Balthasar lives in a castle together with his brothers. He is known to hate unnecessary violence, possessing an artistic nature, and he is a great tactician. Nicknamed Basilisk, Balthasar has the ability to generate a petrifying venom from his palm which can crystallize the living target. He can also petrify his own bodily fluids and fire them in needle-like projectiles. Balthasar is one of the few people Isaak respects, but when Balthasar conspires with Helga, Isaak kills them both.

=== Melchior von Neumann ===
The middle von Neumann brother, Melchior is a silent man with a "bent and twisted" personality. He spends a lot of time around Helga, and she seems to be the only one aware of his powers. Melchior can confuse electronic sensors and he can snap Dietrich's puppet strings. Melchior created an army of Auto-Dolls (earning his code name Pygmalion), with the most special one being Siegelind.

=== Kaspar von Neumann ===
Born from a Terran father and a Methuselah mother, Kaspar is a noble from Ostmark, Vienna. He is the youngest of the von Neumann brothers. Though he has a very tough looking exterior, Kaspar thinks and refers himself as a woman: the little sister "her" brothers look after and who at times put in shame their good name. He is single-minded and vicious despite his natural intelligence and seemly good-natured personality. Unlike his more sophisticated brothers, Kaspar is deviant enough to drink blood raw but hates the taste of "old men's blood." Like his brothers, he has a special power. He is a polymorph, and can change his appearance very well. For this reason, he is known as Hundert Gesicht (A Hundred Face) - a grammatical error for Hundert Gesichter (A hundred faces).

Under Balthasar's orders, he disguises himself as Caterina Sforza to stab Professor Wordsworth. Against his brothers' approval, he travels alone to Rome to finish off the injured Wordsworth. He ends up dueling with Wordsworth, who leaves his hospital bed to defend Caterina Sforza. Sister Kaya uses the distraction of the battle to burn Kaspar to death.

=== Guderian ===
Also known as Reißzahn (fang), who has only spoken once in all his appearances. He works as Isaak's chauffeur and bodyguard. He is apparently a werewolf (possibly a sub-race of the Methuselah). He is extremely ferocious as a werewolf and attacks William and Vanessa. His werewolf form is very large; his back while on four legs is at the same height as Isaak's head and his own head is the same size as Monica Argento's torso. He also possesses incredible reflexes. During his short fight with Monica in the manga, he was able to catch her knife in his mouth and break it, after which he nearly tore her arm off before she retreated. He is able to speak English while in his wolf form, telling Monica to "die" before nearly killing her.

=== Susanne von Skorzeny ===
Also known as Red Baronness, nothing much is known about this androgynous woman yet, except that she is a pilot ace, and her only love seems to be her ship. It is hinted that she might be the one responsible for putting Kate in a coma.

== The Kingdom of Albion ==
A prominent Kingdom that has existed long before the Armageddon, Albion is another name for England, the United Kingdom, or Great Britain. As with history, it is one of the few countries not under control or influence of the Vatican. Known for its large production of Lost Technology, Albion is second only to the Empire in terms of technological advances. Under the streets of the Capital City of Londinium lies the underground city of the Methusulah, more commonly known as the Ghetto. It is here that Albion's vampires live in forced isolation away from the humans. They are the secret behind Albion's technology, and are forced to work to produce it, unable to leave.

=== Mary Spencer ===
Voiced by: Miho Yamada (Japanese); Clarine Harp (English)

A colonel of the Albion Navy and a master of the sword, Mary took command of Albion after the death of the queen. Colonel Spencer is a serious type who deals with problems accordingly. After the Pope was kidnapped, she realized that she could not control nor appease the Methuselah the way the Queen had. In the anime, when Cain Nightroad attacked the palace, Colonel Spencer stood on the front lines with the palace guards in a futile attempt to stop him. Many of the guards were killed, and Mary was injured., after which she stayed loyal to her country and devoted to her duty, by attempting to calm the rebellion until Esther is revealed to be the "Star of Hope" and takes her rightful place as Queen. In the novels, it is revealed that Mary's mother instigated the rebellion that killed the queen so that Mary could become queen (as she was the daughter of the crown prince), placing the blame for the rebellion on Sir Edward White, the knight that had rescued Esther. Because of this, Mary and Esther end up fighting over the throne instead of working together.

In the manga series, Mary is recast as an antagonist, having slowly poisoned the Queen to death and using the vampire 44th Regiment to massacre the nobles of Albion as revenge for sending Mary and the 44th into a death trap against the Methuselah a year earlier. Mary seeks to install Esther on the throne of Albion, but Esther rejects the plan. Mary then tries to kill Esther but hesitates because they are sisters; Father Tres and Vice Admiral Jane then arrive and defeat the 44th. Mary is wounded and escapes on the Thames. As her getaway boat is about to be apprehended by the Royal Navy, she and her last remaining men are mysterious saved by Isaac von Kampfer.

=== Virgil Walsh ===
Voiced by: Yasunori Matsumoto (Japanese); Vic Mignogna (English)

Virgil is a Methuselah who manages the Ghetto and the production of lost technology in Londinium. He tends to stay very calm and relaxed, even in a crisis, and works closely with the government to monitor the factory in the Ghetto. Virgil is also the Count of Manchester, and a privileged member of the House of Manchester. Though he understands the desire of the enslaved Methuselah to be free, he is against his sister Vanessa's willingness to use violence to accomplish it. He has his hopes in the next generation of rulers, who he feels will see how wrong the situation is and will correct it.

When the Queen of Albion died, he was assigned the task of searching for the heir to the throne of Albion, known as the "Star of Hope." After Abel's supposed death and the Rosenkreuz assault on Albion, Virgil goes to the church in Londinium where Esther is mourning for Abel. He reveals to her that she is, in fact, their "Star of Hope", the heir to the throne of Albion and pleads with her to save her people.

=== Vanessa Walsh ===
Voiced by: Akiko Kimura (Japanese); Monica Rial (English)

Unlike her calm and rational brother, Virgil, Vanessa Walsh is much more high strung, angry and short-tempered. Vanessa is also the leader of a Vampire Terrorist Group who attempted to capture Pope Alessandro so that they could use his safety as a bargaining chip. Despite her anger, she was really hoping to free her people, rather than harm the Pope. Vanessa learned that there were some humans who cared about their hardships when Pope Alessandro XVIII stopped Brother Petros from taking her life. She would later destroy Dietrich's death hunters to save the Pope. She would also help the AX destroy Isaak's ship by explaining the mechanics of defensive shield surrounding the aircraft.

=== Queen Bridget II ===
Voiced by: Unknown (Japanese); Pam Dougherty (English)

Brigitte II was the queen of Albion until her death. At the time of her death, Brigitte II prophesied the coming of Esther Blanchett, the "Star of Hope" to Virgil Walsh. Brigitte's only son, Crown Prince Gilbert, and heir to the throne was previously assassinated by the Order. Though her country is not starkly religious, she is stated as being a Catholic in private. As Queen, she was described as being an amazing person, able to keep the Methuselah from rebelling for years under her leadership. The Methuselah radicals claim it was done through oppression, and some believe only the younger generation would be able to truly understand them and bring change.

== Supporting characters ==
=== Lilith Sahl ===
Voiced by: Misa Kobayashi (Japanese); Cynthia Cranz (English)

Lilith was the prototype for Cain, Abel, and Seth and the fourth of the test tube babies created for the Mars Colonization Project by UNASF Scientists. She was in charge of the Health Care area and usually acted as the voice of reason during the conflicts between the Nightroad siblings. During the war, Lilith sided with humanity and the Vatican to save them from the Methuselah, while the three Nightroad siblings joined the Methuselah. Lilith began to convince Abel that his hatred for humans could be wrong. For this, toward the end of the war, Cain tricked her into meeting him for peace and he murdered her. Abel took her body to the Vatican where it lies encased in glass in an underground tomb in Rome. Abel remained in her tomb for 900 years to mourn her death, before rescuing a young Caterina from vampires, leading him to protect the humans as Lilith had. In the anime series, Lilith's Crusnik nanomachines are used to revive Abel from a deathlike state. In the novels, Cain absorbs Crusnik O4's nanomachines.

The anime series never shows Lilith's Crusnik form nor her powers. The novels show her to have beautiful blue wings as Crusnik, and to be a powerful combatant and strategist, protecting humanity from Cain, Seth, Abel, and the Methuselah during the post-Armegeddon Human-Vampire War.

=== Gyula Kadar ===
Voiced by: Kenji Nomura (Japanese); Kent Williams (English)

The Marquis of Hungary, Count Gyula was the Methuselah ruler of Istavan along with his beloved wife, Maria. Maria was a computer genius who loved the Church and frequently visited the town to care for and help anyone in need. After his wife was murdered, Gyula was filled with hatred and consumed with the desire for vengeance against the humans, who he believed had killed her. He became a dictator, ruling Istavan with an iron fist through his military police force. He initially tolerated the presence of Saint Matthias Church, because it helped him keep the people under control. Gyula sent a vampire to attack the clergy at the church, who was injured and arrested by Abel, then sends his troops to attack the clergy member's funeral. Father Abel, Sister Esther and Dietrich rush to his home to stop him from using the "Star of Sorrow," a piece of lost technology that his wife restored, to destroy Rome. After realizing Dietrich was betraying both sides, Abel and Esther are able to stop the satellite and cause it to self-destruct. Gyula, badly wounded from fighting Abel at 40% Crusnik activation, shields Esther from the gunfire of one of his men. He offers to allow Esther to kill him for revenge, but she declines and holds him while he dies.

The anime telling of the Star of Sorrow arc has some significant differences from the original novels and manga, particularly regarding Gyula's actions. In the anime, he had Bishop Laura murdered for refusing to run the church per his orders, then later had the church burnt to the ground. He captured Father Abel and Sister Esther and forced them to watch as he activated the "Star of Sorrow". After being defeated and the Star self-destructed, he used a dagger to kill himself so that he could die in his own home rather than spend his life in the Vatican dungeons. As he lay dying on the floor, he offered Esther the chance to take her vengeance for Bishop Laura, but she refused and instead comforted him in place of his wife until he died.

== See also ==
- List of Trinity Blood light novels
- List of Trinity Blood episodes
