= Sunao Yoshida =

Japanese writer (1969–2004)

Sunao Matsumoto (October 24, 1969 – July 15, 2004), known professionally as Sunao Yoshida (吉田直 Yoshida Sunao), was a Japanese novelist. He was born in Fukuoka Prefecture and graduated from La Salle Junior and Senior High School in Kagoshima. He attended Waseda University and earned a Master's degree from Kyoto University. Yoshida died of a lung blockage in 2004.

Yoshida was known primarily for "light novels," a category in Japanese publishing that includes youth-oriented stories, often featuring anime-style cover illustrations.

In 1997, Yoshida was awarded the Sneaker Taisho literary prize for his debut novel, Genocide Angel. He was the author of the novel series Trinity Blood, which was serialized in Kadokawa Shoten's The Sneaker magazine. The popularity of The Sneaker dropped significantly after Yoshida's death. The Trinity Blood series was published in North America by Tokyopop.

Two years after Yoshida's death, from January to October 2006, his home village of Ashiyamachi, Fukuoka, in conjunction with publishers Kadokawa Shoten, Gonzo and Broccoli, held a "Sunao Exhibit" to memorialize his achievements.

Gainax's scheduled project Neppu Kairiku Bushi Road was indefinitely delayed after his death, as he was supposed to be its world designer. The project was eventually taken over by Kinema Citrus and Orange and completed in 2013.

== Publications ==
- Jenosaido Enjeru - Hangyaku Kamigami. (Genocide Angel: Treason of the Gods) 1997. Kadogawa Shoten.
- Toriniti Burado Rage Against the Moons. (Trinity Blood: Rage Against the Moons) six volumes, 2001-2004. Kadogawa Shoten.
- Toriniti Burado Reborn on the Mars. (Trinity Blood: Reborn on Mars) six volumes, 2001-2003. Kadogawa Shoten.
- Toriniti Burado Reborn on the Mars "Kyokko no Kiba". (Trinity Blood: Reborn on Mars 7, Aurora's Tusk) unfinished.
