= Trinity Blood =

Japanese light novel series

- First volume cover, featuring Abel Nightroad

トリニティ・ブラッド (Toriniti Buraddo)
- Genre: Action; Dark fantasy; Post-apocalyptic
- Light novel
- Written by: Sunao Yoshida
- Illustrated by: Thores Shibamoto
- Published by: Kadokawa Shoten
- English publisher: NA: Tokyopop
- Imprint: Kadokawa Sneaker Bunko
- Original run: February 28, 2001 – December 28, 2004
- Volumes: 12
- Manga
- Written by: Kiyo Kyūjō
- Published by: Kadokawa Shoten
- English publisher: NA: Viz Media (digital)
- Magazine: Asuka (2003–2016); Comic Newtype (2016–2018)
- Original run: October 2003 – April 2018
- Volumes: 21
- Anime television series
- Directed by: Tomohiro Hirata
- Produced by: Takeshi Yasuda; Satoshi Nagai; Tsuneo Takechi
- Written by: Atsuhiro Tomioka; Tomohiro Hirata
- Music by: Takahito Eguchi
- Studio: Gonzo
- Licensed by: Crunchyroll (Note: In North America through Crunchyroll, LLC (formerly known as Funimation).); AUS: Madman Entertainment; UK: MVM Films
- Original network: Wowow
- English network: CA: Razer; US: Adult Swim, Funimation Channel; ZA: Animax
- Original run: April 28, 2005 – October 6, 2005
- Episodes: 24
- icon

Trinity Blood (Japanese: トリニティ・ブラッド, Hepburn: Toriniti Buraddo) is a series of Japanese light novels written by Sunao Yoshida with illustrations by Thores Shibamoto and originally serialized in The Sneaker. Set 900 years after an apocalyptic war between humans and vampires, the series focuses on the ongoing cold war between the Vatican, the human government, and the "New Human Empire", the government of the vampiric Methuselah. Fighting on the Vatican's side is Abel Nightroad, a Crusnik—a vampire that feeds on vampires. The novels blend science fiction, fantasy, and political intrigue, with some in the Vatican and the Empire striving for peace, and the Rosen Kreuz Order doing anything in its power to stop it.

Trinity Blood has been adapted into both manga and anime series, with continuity differences between the three versions. After Yoshida's death in 2004, his friend Kentaro Yasui aided in completing the manga, with illustrations by Kiyo Kyūjō. The anime series, spanning 24 episodes, was produced by Gonzo and originally aired on Wowow network. Both adaptations have the same unresolved conclusion as the final novel.

== Plot ==
When Earth's population drastically increased, humanity, led by the United Nations, attempted to colonize Mars. During the colonization, they discovered two alien technologies: the Bacillus virus and the Crusnik nanomachines. The colonists injected the Bacillus in their bodies which transformed them into a vampiric race known as "Methuselah". They installed the Crusnik in the bodies of four test tube babies: Seth, Cain, Abel and Lilith whose enhanced bodies were the only ones able to survive the procedure. Continuing wars on Earth eventually led to Armageddon, the apocalyptic event that happened 900 years before the start of the story, and the colonists returned to Earth to help with rebuilding. However, when the colonists returned to Earth, a war broke out between the Methuselah and the humans who had remained on Earth. Abel, Cain, and Seth sided with the Methuselah—while Lilith supported the Vatican, which guarded humanity. During the war, Cain went insane and killed Lilith. In grief, Abel took her body to the Vatican where she was buried. Abel remained at her side, weeping for her, for 900 years.

At the start of the story, the Methuselah, still a major political and military force, continue to wage war on the "Terrans", as they call the human inhabitants of Earth. The Roman Catholic Church is a major military power determined to protect humans from the Methuselah, with its seat of power based in the Vatican. The Methuselah have their capital in Byzantium, which is surrounded by a field of particles to filter out UV radiation, protecting the Methuselah population. Both groups use "lost technologies", such as airships, missiles, and computers, to engage in a cold war with one another. A third great power, Albion also plays a role in the war with its superior arsenal of lost technology and weapons and higher level of manufacturing ability versus the Vatican. The independent monarchy of Albion is a primarily human country, however the secret of their expertise in lost technology is found in the Ghetto, an underground city of enslaved Methuselah. It is these Methuselah who operate and manufacture the lost technology, but with the death of the Albion Queen, some of the enslaved vampires begin a rebellion for the freedom of all of the Ghetto residents.

=== Differences among adaptations ===
While the novels, manga, and anime series all cover the same basic story and feature many of the same characters, they do have some minor and major differences. Each has its own unique variation on the major story arcs, and in general the novels give the most detail concerning the political elements and background information on the stories. There are a few minor name changes and many details found in the novels are not given in the anime or manga.

Dietrich's character design, as seen in the manga, is younger and more boyish than in the anime

The artwork also differs from all three versions, as the character designs were each created by different artists. There are similarities, however, as Shibamoto is responsible for the novel illustrations, while Kiyo Kyūjō based his work in the manga on Shibamoto's original designs. In the anime series, Dietrich von Lohengrin's cold, evil nature is reflected in his appearance, while in the manga he has a softer, bishōnen design that is incongruous with his actual nature. Similarly, Endre is described as looking like a boy of around 10–12 years old, while in the anime he is given an adult appearance. In additions to variants in appearances, there are differences in personalities relationships between the versions, and there are some characters that are unique to each adaptation. Sister Noelle, whose death devastates Abel in the anime series and in the novels, does not exist in the manga series. Alternatively, the anime does not mention Father Tres' two "brothers".

Depending on the adaptation, some events occur at varying points in the story, while other events are unique to a single adaptation. The anime series' introductory-style episodes are based on the novel segments with the same names, but they are told in a different story. For example, in the novels, "From the Empire", the chapter in which Abel meets Asthe is the third chapter, following Flight Night and Witch Hunt, However, in the anime, "From the Empire" is the eleventh episode, coming after the Star of Sorrow arc and the Silent Noise incident. Conversely, the manga starts right with the Star of Sorrow arc and Abel meeting Esther and Dietrich. The Neumann brothers and their related story elements are found only in the novels. In the novels, it was Abel who interrupted the Cardinal's gathering, rather than Caterina or Leon, and the only people available to investigate the Silent Noise incident in Rome are Abel, Tres, and Leon.

== Characters ==
=== Humans ===
The humans once attempted to colonize Mars after a massive population explosion. While on Mars, they discovered the Bacillus and Crusnik nanomachines. When the Bacillus virus was embedded in humans, they were infected with a virus that changed them into vampires who had to feed on blood to survive. While this was happening on Mars, on Earth, continuing wars resulted in Armageddon, the apocalyptic war that nearly destroyed humanity. The vampires—who now call themselves Methuselahs—and the humans ended up in a war against each other when the Methuselah returned to Earth. Nine hundred years later the surviving humans are still trying to recover from the war's devastating effects while trying to find ways to co-exist with the Methuselah despite the distrust and hatred still evident on both sides. The Vatican serves as the primary leader for the people in the ongoing struggle for peace with the Methuselah, and in dealing with rogue factions from both sides that would like the war to continue. The Methuselah refer to humans as "Terrans", or the "Short-Lived Race".

=== Methuselah ===
The Methuselah, or "Long-Lived Race", are vampire-like creatures that feed on human blood and have supernatural strength. Their name is likely derived from the biblical figure Methuselah, who was reported to have lived 969 years. Methuselah have a prolonged lifespan, superior strength, and enhanced speed. They also have healing and regeneration abilities.

In addition to their athleticism and stamina, Methuselah also possess varying individual powers. Most frequently, this power manifests itself in the form of a blade that comes out of the arms, claws, or even as sharp, prehensile hair. Some Methuselah have displayed an ability to control some elemental powers such as fire and ice. When being born, a Methuselah behaves as any normal human. He or she is able to wake during daytime and lacks the supernatural life and shortcomings of the race.

=== Crusniks ===
Cain, Crusnik 01, in his Crusnik form

Crusniks are vampires who feed on the blood of other vampires. They possess immense power and destructive potential and are nearly invincible. Whereas the Methuselahs are either born or infected, the Crusniks are unique beings created as a result of an experiment during the Mars Colonization Project. The three Crusniks, Seth, Abel, and Lilith, were test tube babies created for the Mars Colonization Project by the UNASF with genetically enhanced bodies. They were infused with the Crusnik nanomachines that were found on Mars as their enhanced bodies were the only ones capable of surviving the procedure. The exact circumstances behind the infusions of Seth, Abel, and Lilith are unknown, while Cain's infusion was done by Seth to save his life after a fatal accident.

Crusniks possess unique attributes that separate them from Methuselahs. For instance, both Abel and Cain sport angelic wings and can fly quite easily. Crusniks can transmute their blood into weapons and often possess psychokinetic powers. Abel can generate powerful bio-electric fields while Cain can use psychokinetic waves to pulverize objects and enemies and to generate barriers. Seth can reduce people and objects to dust using sound waves.

In order to activate his Crusnik powers, Abel usually issues a verbal or mental command to the nanomachines in his body. The exact wording and method of activation varies among the novels, the manga, and anime, and between the original Japanese and the English translations. For example, in the anime he says "Nanomachines: Crusnik 02 – Power Output __% Activate" while in the manga he silently activates Crusnik mode and receives a confirmation from the nanomachines of "Crusnik 02 Loading. Limitation at __%... Acknowledged". In the anime, neither Cain nor Seth demonstrated a need to do this in order to activate their powers, and there are several times when Abel activates his powers without saying his usual command, so it appears to just be a literary device; the only exception to this is in the third novel where Sister Paula Souwauski, who is in combat with him, prevents the change by not letting him finish the statement, as it would flip the playing field as Abel in his human form is ranked as having a B− fighting ability while his 40% Crusnik is described as an S+.

== Media ==
=== Novels ===
Written by Sunao Yoshida and illustrated by Thores Shibamoto, Trinity Blood consists of two six-volume sub-series. The first series is subtitled Rage Against the Moons (RAM), while the second series, which continues where the first leaves off, is subtitled Reborn on the Mars (ROM). The novels began as a one-shot in The Sneaker in October 1999 and launched as a serialized novel in February 2000, with completed volumes published by Kadokawa Shoten from 2001. Following the novels, a book containing backstory, world information and unreleased stories entitled Canon Summa Theologica, was released May 1, 2005.

In North America, the novels have been licensed for an English language release by Tokyopop. The series were on a four-month release schedule that alternates between Rage Against the Moons and Reborn on the Mars. They were translated by Anastasia Moreno with adaptation by Jai Nitz. Seven novels total were released from 2007 to 2010. TimunMas translated and released the novels in Spanish in Spain.

=== Rage Against the Moons ===
No.	Title	Original release date	English release date
1	From the Empire; Furomu ji Enpaia (フロム・ジ・エンパイア)	April 27, 2001; 4-04-418404-6	April 10, 2007; 978-1-59816-953-9
2	Silent Noise; Sairento Noizu (サイレント・ノイズ)	December 26, 2001; 4-04-418406-2	December 11, 2007; 978-1-59816-954-6
3	No Faith; Nō Feisu (ノウ・フェイス)	August 31, 2002; 4-04-418408-9	June 12, 2008; 978-1-59816-955-3
4	Judgement Day; Jajjimento Dei (ジャッジメント・デイ)	March 28, 2003; 4-04-418410-0	April 27, 2010; 978-1-59816-956-0
5	Bird Cage; Bādo Kēji (バード・ケージ)	February 1, 2004; 4-04-418413-5	—
6	Apocalypse Now; Apokaripusu Nau (アポカリプス・ナウ)	December 28, 2004; 4-04-418415-1	—

=== Reborn on the Mars ===
No.	Title	Original release date	English release date
1	The Star of Sorrow; Nageki no Hoshi (嘆きの星)	February 28, 2001; 4-04-418403-8	August 7, 2007; 978-1-4278-0090-9
2	The Iblis; Nessa no Tenshi (熱砂の天使)	July 31, 2001; 4-04-418405-4	April 8, 2008; 978-1-4278-0091-6
3	Empress of the Night; Yoru no Joō (夜の女皇)	June 29, 2002; 4-04-418407-0	November 10, 2009; 978-1-4278-0092-3
4	Mark of the Holy Woman; Seijo no Rakuin (聖女の烙印)	December 27, 2002; 4-04-418409-7	—
5	Throne of Roses; Bara no Gyokuza (薔薇の玉座)	August 1, 2003; 4-04-418411-9	—
6	Crown of Thorns; Ibara no Hōkan (茨の宝冠)	November 1, 2003; 4-04-418412-7	—

=== Trinity Blood Canon ===
Torinitei Buraddo Canon Shingaku Taizen (トリニティ・ブラッド Canon 神学大全; lit. Trinity Blood Canon Summa Theologica) was released in Japan on May 1, 2005 (ISBN 4-04-418416-X-C0193) by Kadokawa Shoten and features four stories not in the original novels (Gunmetal Hound, Human Factor, ROM VII – Aurora's Fang, and Stories Untold). A Traditional Chinese translation of the book, Trinity Blood Canon 聖魔之血 神學大全 (ISBN 978-986-237-543-3), was released on February 10, 2010, by Taiwan Kadokawa, and is available in Taiwan and Hong Kong.

=== Manga ===
The chapters of the Trinity Blood manga series are illustrated by Kiyo Kyūjō, with story assistance by Kentaro Yasui. The series premiered in the shōjo manga magazine Monthly Asuka in 2004, and finished in April 2018, after transferring to Comic Newtype website in 2016. Individual chapters are called "Acts", and the chapter titles are based on film titles, except for chapter 22, the title of which comes from "the lyrics of the theme song of a certain pioneering kendo anime". The individual chapters were collected and published in 21 tankōbon volumes by Kadokawa Shoten, with the first released on March 17, 2004; and the last on June 23, 2018.

The series was licensed for English-language release in North America by Tokyopop, who released twelve volumes from 2006 to 2010. Viz Media re-licensed the manga for digital-only release in 2014, releasing the same twelve volumes. In Australia and New Zealand, both the Chuang Yi and Tokyopop volumes are being released by Madman Entertainment through an importation agreement.

No.	Original release date	Original ISBN	English release date	English ISBN
1	March 17, 2004	978-4-04-924970-5	November 7, 2006	978-1-59816-674-3
2	July 17, 2004	978-4-04-924976-7	March 13, 2007	978-1-59816-675-0
3	January 17, 2005	978-4-04-924994-1	July 10, 2007	978-1-59816-676-7
4	June 17, 2005	978-4-04-925003-9	November 13, 2007	978-1-59816-677-4
5	September 17, 2005	978-4-04-925012-1	February 13, 2008	978-1-4278-0014-5
6	February 2, 2006	978-4-04-925021-3	May 13, 2008	978-1-4278-0015-2
7	July 15, 2006	978-4-04-925029-9	August 12, 2008	978-1-4278-0177-7
8	December 16, 2006	978-4-04-925038-1	November 11, 2008	978-1-4278-0692-5
9	May 17, 2007	978-4-04-925043-5	February 3, 2009	978-1-4278-0884-4
10	February 16, 2008	978-4-04-925057-2	May 1, 2009	978-1-4278-1523-1
11	October 17, 2008	978-4-04-925064-0	August 1, 2009	978-1-4278-1638-2
12	August 24, 2009	978-4-04-925068-8	March 30, 2010	978-1-4278-1796-9
13	November 24, 2010	978-4-04-925072-5	—	—
14	October 24, 2011	978-4-04-854692-8	—	—
15	August 24, 2012	978-4-04-925078-7	—	—
16	March 23, 2013	978-4-04-925079-4	—	—
17	March 24, 2014	978-4-04-121042-0	—	—
18	March 24, 2015	978-4-04-102770-7	—	—
19	March 24, 2016	978-4-04-104090-4	—	—
20	April 24, 2017	978-4-04-105556-4	—	—
21	June 23, 2018	978-4-04-106957-8	—	—

=== Anime ===
The Trinity Blood anime television series premiered on the satellite network Wowow on April 28 and ran through October 6, 2005, spanning a total of 24 episodes. Directed by Tomohiro Hirata, it featured character designs by Atsuko Nakajima and music by Takahito Eguchi. The satellite channel Animax also aired the series in English across its networks in Southeast Asia, South Asia and South Africa, and in Spanish and Portuguese across its networks throughout Latin America, respectively. The series also aired in Malaysia on ntv7, in Australia on the Australian Cartoon Network's Adult Swim, and in Spain on Buzz Channel.

Funimation, which owns the Region 1 license for the series, gave Trinity Blood a 90-minute US theatrical release to promote the series. The film was made by combining the first four episodes of the series. Named Trinity Blood: Genesis, the movie was released May 5, 2006, in conjunction with Anime Central in Chicago, IL, followed by a limited run in select theaters and at other anime conventions. The series was released on DVD in six volumes with English and Japanese audio and English subtitles. Each volume is available in a regular edition, a limited edition, and as part of the value priced Viridian Collection. They have also released the complete series as a complete series box set.

The Funimation English dub of the series first premiered on Canadian television on the Razer network on July 6, 2006 and later in the United States as part of Cartoon Network's Adult Swim programming block on September 10. These dubbed episodes have also been made available on Netflix and for purchasing through iTunes, with the option to buy individual episodes or the entire series.

== Reception ==
The first volume of the Trinity Blood manga reached the 30th spot on the Top 100 Graphic Novel sales for November 2006. Subsequent volumes have also all appeared in the top 100 spots in March, July, and November 2007.

The Trinity Blood anime series enjoyed strong television ratings when it originally aired in Japan. Its North American debut was also considered successful. The series is one of four FUNimation properties credited with helping the company achieve a 47.8% sales gain in 2006.

Anime News Network's Carl Kimlinger finds the series "shiny, attractive, and—on the whole—entertaining". But he adds that "given the premise (and skill of the writers) it really should have shot for pulpy thrills instead of stately political intrigue." Theron Martin says "for the series as a whole to be worth watching, though, the storytelling and character development need to improve". Melissa Harper adds it is a "slick, well animated show" but "disjointed story makes it difficult to know or care what is going on". Hyper's Daniel Wilks comments that the anime is "for most part rather formulaic but the series does really pick up when it comes to the action scenes which are fast, frenetic, highly creative and beautifully animated". Collider's Lucas Kloberdanz-Dyck ranked the manga ninth in its list of 10 Most Underrated Manga, praising its stunningly intricate artwork and original take on vampire lore.

== See also ==
- History of the Kingdom of the Orcsen: How the Barbarian Orcish Nation Came to Burn Down the Peaceful Elfland, another light novel series with the same illustrator
- Vampire film
- List of vampire television series
