= The Sneaker =

Japanese light novel magazine

- Cover of The Sneaker June 2006 Issue, illustrated by Noizi Ito.
- Categories: Light Novels
- Frequency: Bi-monthly
- Publisher: Kadokawa Shoten
- First issue: 1993
- Final issue: 2011
- Country: Japan
- Based in: Tokyo
- Language: Japanese
- Website: The Sneaker

The Sneaker (ザ・スニーカー, Za Sunīkā) is a Japanese light novel magazine that was published by Kadokawa Shoten between 1993 and 2011. It was launched April 1993 then proceeded to be published monthly for most of its run. The magazine was aimed at a young adult male audience. It serialized many popular light novels, including the Haruhi Suzumiya and Trinity Blood series, and the novel adaptations of the Code Geass anime series. In the final year of its run, the Sneaker editor in Chief Koichi Sakamoto said the company would expand their 'Bunko' (pocket sized paper back books), and broaden their use of web and electronic books in response to their readers needs.

== October 31 2018 special one-time revival ==
Included an all new short story in Nagaru Tanigawa's Haruhi Suzumiya series. The included draft was called "Seven Wonders Overtime". It was considered rather long for a short story as it was around 120 Japanese manuscript pages long. The special issue also included an extended interview and new short Story by Ryo Mizuno for Record of Lodoss War. introduced a new short story and a short manga interview centered around KonoSuba.

The cover art of the special edition was drawn by two artists Kurone Mishima and Noizi Ito. The art consisted of Aqua from KonoSuba, and Haruhi from Haruhi Suzumiya. The choice of each artist was due to each of them being familiar with each property. Kurone Mishima being the main artist for KonoSuba and Noizi Ito having been the main artist for Haruhi Suzumiya.

Unlike the formerly mentioned short stories, Sagrada Reset, Rental Magica, and Trinity Blood received special features and new illustrations.
