= The Eleventh Day: Single Collection =

Compilation album by Gackt
- Released: July 21, 2010
- Recorded: 2004–2009
- Genre: Alternative rock, art rock, hard rock, neo-prog, symphonic rock, pop rock, folk rock, electronic rock, baroque pop
- Length: 68:00
- Label: Nippon Crown
- Producer: Gackt

Gackt chronology
Are You "Fried Chickenz"?? (2010)	The Eleventh Day: Single Collection (2010)	Best of the Best: Mild and Wild (2013)

The Eleventh Day: Single Collection is a greatest hits album by Japanese recording artist Gackt, released on July 21, 2010.

It includes all of his singles from the preceding five years, covering material released after The Sixth Day (2004). The album was released by his former label Nippon Crown, and it was his last album with the label after he transferred to Avex Group's recording conglomerate.

== Track listing ==
All tracks are written by Gackt C.

No.	Title	Length
1.	"Kimi ni Aitakute"
2.	"Arittake no Ai de"
3.	"Black Stone"
4.	"Metamorphoze"
5.	"Todokanai Ai to Shitteitanoni Osaekirezu ni Aishitsuzuketa..."
6.	"Redemption"
7.	"Love Letter"
8.	"No ni Saku Hana no Yō ni"
9.	"Returner (Yami no Shūen)"
10.	"Jesus"
11.	"Ghost"
12.	"Koakuma Heaven"
13.	"Faraway (Hoshi ni Negai o)"
14.	"Lost Angels"
15.	"Flower"

== Chart performance ==
=== Oricon sales charts ===
Release	Provider(s)	Chart	Peak position	Sales total
July 21, 2010	Oricon	Weekly Albums	7	10,706
July 21, 2010	Oricon	/	/	20,079

=== Billboard Japan ===
Chart	Peak position
Top Albums	9
