= Best of the Best: Mild and Wild =

- Box set with both albums: Mild (left), Wild (right)

Compilation album by Gackt
- Released: July 3, 2013
- Recorded: 2009–2013
- Genre: Alternative rock, art rock, pop rock, hard rock, neo-prog
- Length: 58:00; 61:00
- Label: Avex Trax
- Producer: Gackt

Gackt chronology
The Eleventh Day (2010)	Best of the Best: Mild and Wild (2013)	Mysteries of Yoshitsune I & II (2014)

Best of the Best: Mild and Wild are Japanese recording artist Gackt's two separate compilation albums released on July 3, 2013, and include songs released throughout his career, some never performed live and released before on an album.

== Overview ==
The new tour titled "Best of the Best Vol. I" represented Gackt's comeback to his solo career, and his first solo tour in four years. It started on May 11, at Katsushika Symphony Hills Mozart Hall, and ended with three consecutive shows on July 7 at the Yokohama Arena, with twenty-two concerts in total, and attendance of eighty thousand people.

== Composition ==
The albums were released in two editions, "Mild", themed around milder ballads, and "Wild", themed around rock songs. Both albums include one new song, the first "Sakura, Chiru...", and the second "Claymore". Several older songs, like "Doomsday", "Missing" and "Emu ～for my dear～", were re-recorded.

The music video of "Sakura, Chiru..." (サクラ、散ル...; lit. "Sakura, Falling...") shows the worldview of the Moon Saga - Mysteries of Yoshitsune I & II theatre stage play in the late Heian period, and features reprisation of Taichi Saotome's role as the mysterious ghost Mononoke. The song "Claymore" was used as the theme song for the Japanese release of the movie Silent Hill: Revelation.

== Release ==
Both albums were released in standard (CD) and limited (CD+DVD) edition, as well together in a limited box set. Limited editions for both albums were also released in both DVD and Blu-ray editions, including music videos, also of "Claymore" and "Sakura, Chiru...", while the box set included both limited edition albums.

Both albums charted on the Oricon charts, where reached number eight and nine, and charted for six and five weeks. The box set reached number eight and charted for six weeks. On the Top Albums list of Billboard Japan reached number twenty-one and twenty-three, while the box set nineteenth place.

== Track listing ==
All tracks are written by Gackt C., exception #5 and #10 in Mild, #4 and #13 in Wild, with Shoko Fujibayashi and Ryo.

Mild
No.	Title	Length
1.	"White Lovers -Shiawase no Toki-"
2.	"Dispar"
3.	"Ghost"
4.	"Emu ～for my dear～ (re-recording)"
5.	"Journey Through the Decade"
6.	"Hakuro"
7.	"Last Song ～unplugged～ (re-recording)"
8.	"Vanilla (re-recording)"
9.	"Koakuma Heaven"
10.	"Graffiti"
11.	"Kimi no Tame ni Dekiru Koto (re-recording)"
12.	"Missing ～Egao Wo Misete～ (re-recording)"
13.	"Sakura, Chiru..."

Wild
No.	Title	Length
1.	"Doomsday (re-recording)"
2.	"Death Wish (re-recording)"
3.	"Redemption"
4.	"Until the Last Day"
5.	"Claymore"
6.	"Flower"
7.	"Sayonara"
8.	"Black Stone (re-recording)"
9.	"Another World (re-recording)"
10.	"Ever"
11.	"Jounetsu no Inazuma"
12.	"Jesus"
13.	"Stay the Ride Alive"
