= 0079–0088 =

- Cover to the standard edition of the album

Compilation album by Gackt
- Released: December 19, 2007
- Recorded: 2007; Recording Studio9; West Side (Mixer's Lab); Tom Tom Studio; Warner Music R.St. (Mix. Lab)
- Genre: Alternative rock, hard rock
- Length: 37:14
- Label: Nippon Crown
- Producer: Gackt

Gackt chronology
Jūnigatsu no Love Song: Complete Box (2006)	0079–0088 (2007)	Re:Born (2009)

0079–0088 is a compilation album released by Gackt on December 19, 2007. It contains eight tracks, which had either previously been used on the soundtracks of the Mobile Suit Zeta Gundam movies or were covers of earlier songs from the Gundam franchise.

== Overview ==
The collaboration with the "Gundam Series" began in 2005, as were used Gackt's songs as opening and ending themes in the movie trilogy of Mobile Suit Zeta Gundam reproduction, Mobile Suit Zeta Gundam: A New Translation.

On May 25, 2005, was released a single "Metamorphoze", which included a same titled song and a remixed version of previously released song "Kimi Ga Matteiru Kara". They were the opening and ending theme songs for the first movie Heirs to the Stars. The single was a commercial success as reached number two on the Oricon charts, and sold over 160,000 copies, being certified gold by RIAJ. Also the singles music video combined footage from the anime with live-action sequences of Gackt piloting in a UC 0093 (Char's Counterattack era) spacesuit and linear seat (a type of cockpit setup in the Gundam series).

In the same year was released the second movie in the trilogy, Lovers, and Gackt's song "Mind Forest" was the ending theme song. In the all three movies, the ending songs were from the Gackt's album Crescent.

On March 1, 2006, was released a second single "Love Letter", which title song was previously released on the Love Letter album, and also included remixed version of previously released song "Dybbuk". They were the opening and ending theme songs for the third movie Love is the Pulse of Stars.

Created as the tribute to the creator of Gundam, Yoshiyuki Tomino, for his birthday, the album contains five tracks which had been used on the soundtracks of the Mobile Suit Zeta Gundam movies, as well three Gackt's covers of earlier songs from the Gundam franchise, "Ai Senshi", "Suna no Jūjika ~Interlude~", and "Meguriai".

The first track "Ai Senshi" was later used as the main theme for the 2007 video game, Mobile Suit Gundam: Gundam vs. Gundam Next. In the sequel game, Mobile Suit Gundam: Extreme Vs., Gackt voiced up the pilot Ex (イクス, IIx).

=== Release ===
Themed after the Mobile Suit Zeta Gundam series, it was released in a regular edition and two limited editions. The limited ones contain narration by Toru Furuya (who provides the voice of Gundam character Amuro Ray) and Shuichi Ikeda (voice actor of Char Aznable), respectively. In the fifth counting week of December, it reached number six on the Oricon charts, with sales of 40,604 copies. In the initial week of January, 2008, it reached number twenty-six, with sales of 17,316 copies, and charted overall for nine weeks, and sold over 70,000 copies.

=== Critical reception ===
0079-0088 was in generally positively received. Alexey Eremenko, of Allmusic, gave the album a 3.5 out of 5 stars rating. He said it "defines pop/rock" and praised the Gackts ability for which "there's no one to rival" him, possibly "in the rest of the world". Described it as "nominally hard rock", that "guitar riffs are carefully trimmed in power and balanced with danceable rhythms and keys in the background", because they "support and emphasize Gackt's smooth, sleek, unnaturally heartfelt voice". Eremenko, concluded that it's "exceptionally well done, moderately diverse, if not groundbreaking", and "generally impressive as hell".

== Track listing ==
All lyrics are written by Gackt C.; all music is composed by Gackt C. (except M-1, M-5, M-9).

No.	Title	Length
1.	"Ai Senshi" ("Soldiers of Sorrow" (哀 戦士))	3:28
2.	"Metamorphoze"	3:46
3.	"Kimi ga Matteiru Kara" ("Because You Are Waiting" (君が待っているから))	4:17
4.	"Mind Forest"	4:35
5.	"Suna no Jūjika ~Interlude~" ("Cross of Sand (Interlude)" (砂の十字架 ～Interlude～))	3:15
6.	"Dybbuk"	3:31
7.	"Dears"	4:41
8.	"Love Letter"	4:59
9.	"Meguriai" (Encounter (めぐりあい))	4:39

== Personnel ==
- Katsuyuki Abe – Engineer, Mixing
- Hiroshi Hasegawa – Executive Producer
- Rena Koyanagi – Mastering
- Jun Misaki – Art Direction, Design
- Koji Morimoto – Engineer, Mixing
