= Re:Born (album) =

Studio album by Gackt
- Released: December 2, 2009
- Recorded: 2008–2009
- Length: 66:55 (Music CD); 68:48 (Original Drama CD)
- Label: Dears
- Producer: Gackt

Gackt chronology
0079–0088 (2007)	Re:Born (2009)	Are You "Fried Chickenz"?? (2010)

Singles from Re:Born
- 1. "Jesus" Released: December 3, 2008; 2. "Ghost" Released: January 28, 2009; 3. "Koakuma Heaven" Released: June 10, 2009; 4. "Faraway" Released: June 17, 2009; 5. "Lost Angels" Released: June 24, 2009; 6. "Flower" Released: July 01, 2009

Alternative cover
- Dears only

Re:Born is the seventh full-length studio album released by Japanese recording artist Gackt on December 2, 2009, in Japan. It is a concept album linked to its predecessor Rebirth from 2001, and besides the music disc, contains an original audio drama.

== Overview ==
The December 2008, with the release of his first single "Jesus" in over a year, marked Gackt's return to his solo music projects after three years, and the sequel to the concept created and incorporated in the second studio album Rebirth and tour Requiem et Reminiscence I in 2001.

In 2009, on January 28 was released his twenty-ninth single "Ghost", and in commemoration to his 10th anniversary as a solo artist, were released four singles, "Koakuma Heaven", "Faraway", "Lost Angels", and "Flower", a week after one another starting from June 10, and ending on July 1.

The album contains two CDs. The "Music CD" contains songs from six of the eight singles released by Gackt from December 2008 to July 2009, and the "Original Drama CD" contains the original audio story Requiem et Reminiscence II, which is an audio drama featuring Gackt and many well known voice actors such as Hidekatsu Shibata, Unshō Ishizuka, Jun Fukuyama, and Keiji Fujiwara.

== Summary ==
The concept's "Requiem et Reminiscence II" story synopsis was revealed through "Asakura Report" before the tour on Gackt's website, and like the "Requiem et Reminiscence I" story, is set during the World War II in Nazi Germany. It follows two soldiers Rei Hartmann and Ryuichi Asakura who were recruited in the SS German army. Asakura was studying in robotics engineering corporation's laboratory when the eventual friendship triangle between them and Maria was interrupted by Ryuchi's jealousy; the similarity of Rei with disappeared cyborg Proto was enough to unwillingly be transformed into a cyborg. Like Proto, Rei now known as Zero, became Humanoid Assault Weapon Type 2, "Zwei", and the commander of regrouped 4th Independent Tactical Guerrilla Force (part of the 2nd SS Panzer Division Das Reich), shortened name "Ghost". Seemingly with erased memories, Zero began to remember his most precious memories when was human, and when finally recalled and understood his existence, led other awakened cyborgs in a failed revolt against the engineering headquarters. The tragic story ends with Zero lying damaged on the ground, saying to the Nazi soldiers his more human than them, after which got destroyed by machine gun shots by the infuriated Nazi General.

The theme of the concept, like his other "Moon", is about the existential questions of humanity. Questions who are humans and the existence of a God, and why at the same time destructive and loving, humanity decides to start wars.

== Composition ==
According to Gackt, the keywords for describing the music is "decadent", "destructive", "aggressive" and "ephemeral". As was pursuing a band's sound so it became more straightforward and kept cutting out strings in comparison to previous albums. Considering sound production, were used all "super low" sounds that are often removed in Japanese productions, making more intense listening experience.

The song "Jesus" is hard rock, while "Sayonara" is a re-recording of a piano piece from album "Rebirth". Some songs are different than to the others in Gackt's catalog, as with "Ghost" being an electronic rock track combining synthesizer, guitar riff and voice filters, similarly dark moody "Blue Lagoon" which also uses various effects. Other songs featured on singles "Lost Angels" and "Flower" are likewise of dramatic composition, while on singles "Faraway" and "Koakuma Heaven" are more pop-rock upbeat styled tunes. They show new creativity and vision arguably missing in his previous work. However, conceptually track "Koakuma Heaven" does not suit the seriousness of the conceptual story.

== Release ==
A special edition was released exclusively for members of Gackt's fanclub Dears. In addition to the two CDs, this edition includes an extra 10th anniversary disc with two promotional videos for "Flower", extra pictures and documents from the making of Requiem et Reminiscence II, and a special message to his fans.

The album was released on December 2, 2009, in Japan by his own independent label Dears, still owned by Nippon Crown. In the initial daily release it reached number two on the Oricon charts, with sales of 13,371 copies. Although with promising first daily count, in the initial counting week it ended at number nine with sales of 19,655 copies. In the monthly chart were counted sales of 31,403 copies, and charted for 8 weeks. On the Billboard Japan Top Albums chart peaked at number seventeen, and on Top Independent at number three.

The singles "Jesus" and "Ghost" reached number seven and six, and charted for ten and six weeks. The four commemorative singles all managed to enter the top ten on the charts, and all singles sold between 20,000 and 35,000 copies. On the Billboard Japan Hot 100, they mostly reached top forty ("Flower" peaked at number 30), while on Hot Single Sales nearly the same as on Oricon charts ("Lost Angels" peaked at number 5).

== Requiem et Reminiscence II tour ==
On December 14, 2008, Gackt went on his longest nationwide tour Requiem et Reminiscence II -Saisei to Kaikō- (Requiem et Reminiscence II -再生と邂逅-, -Rebirth and Reunion-), which included over 60 concerts in more than forty-five cities. First part of the tour with 51 concerts in 42 cities gathered an audience of 110,000–120,000 people, while second and arena part of the tour with 8 concerts in 4 cities gathered an additional 100,000 people.

Concert scheduled on March 12, 2009, at Asahikawa Civic Culture Hall was canceled due to exceeding asbestos value at the venue. On May 18, Gackt was scheduled to perform a concert in South Korea at Seoul's Olympic Hall, but due to the effects of the global recession the sponsors of the concert withdrew their support. On June 13 at Makuhari Messe Event Hall began the arena part of the tour, and on July 4 was held a fanclub concert to celebrate his birthday at the Yoyogi National Stadium. On July 11 and 12 were held the final concerts at the Saitama Super Arena.

The DVD video recording of the final concert, although initially planned for November 18, 2009, because of editing and sound production was released on March 31, 2010. The video film screened in many cinemas across Japan, and attracted an audience of several thousands of spectators.

== Track listing ==
All tracks are written by Gackt C.

Music CD
No.	Title	Length
1.	"Jesus -ЯRII-"	4:08
2.	"Suddenly"	5:10
3.	"No Reason -ЯRII-"	4:30
4.	"In Flames"	6:38
5.	"Sayonara -ЯRII-"	6:15
6.	"Ghost"	4:05
7.	"Blue Lagoon (Shinkai)" (Blue Lagoon -深海-; "Blue Lagoon -Ocean Depths-")	4:39
8.	"Oblivious (Kao no Nai Tenshi)" (Oblivious -顔のない天使-; "Oblivious -Faceless Angel-")	5:14
9.	"My Father's Day"	4:08
10.	"Koakuma Heaven" (小悪魔ヘヴン; "Devil Heaven")	3:48
11.	"Faraway (Hoshi ni Negai o)" (Faraway -星に願いを-; "Faraway -Wish Upon a Star-")	5:14
12.	"Flower -ЯRII-"	6:32
13.	"Lost Angels"	6:33

Drama CD
No.	Title	Length
1.	"Re:born "Zero's Mail" – Scene (1–25)"

=== Notes ===
- "My Father's Day" was written in memory of Fūrin Kazan (Taiga drama) co-actor and close friend, Ken Ogata.
- The "Original Drama CD" contains the audio story Requiem et Reminiscence. This story CD contains twenty-five nearly identically titled tracks, starting with "Rebirth to Re:born Zero's Mail – Scene 1" and ending with "Zero's Mail – Scene 25".

=== Cast ===
- Rei Hartmann, Zero in RRII, and Proto in RRI: Gackt
- Maria Klose: Nana Mizuki
- Ryuichi Asakura: Jun Fukuyama
- Arkaist: Keiji Fujiwara
- Domino Halemeier: Unshō Ishizuka
- Maria's mother: Kikuko Inoue
- Ghost vice-captain: Tomonori Otsuka
- Professor: Hidekatsu Shibata

== Album credits ==
Personnel

- Vocals, Piano: Gackt
- Guitar, Violin: You
- Guitar: Chachamaru
- Bass: Ikuo, Masao Akashi
- Drums: Jun-Ji, Sakura
- Violin: Gen Ittetsu
- Programming & Manipulator: You, Tsugumichi “Atw” Takagi, Keiichi “Ishiichan” Sugiyama, Daisuke Kikuchi, Masafumi Okubo (Zack)
- Strings Arrangement Coordinate: Mitsunori Ohta (Zack)
- Strings Arrangement: Masafumi Okubo (Zack)

Production

- Producer: Gackt
- Associate Producer: Chachamaru
- Executive Producer: Hiroshi Hasegawa (Gordie Entertainment)
- Recording Engineer: Katsuyuki Abe (Mixer's Lab), Masahiro Shimbo (Mixer's Lab)
- Mixing Engineer/Programming: Masahito Tobisawa
- Mastering Engineer: Yoichi Aikawa (Rolling Sound Mastering Studio)
- Recording Studio: Boomerang Studio (Recording), Wonder Station (Final Mixing), Aobadai Studio (Mastering), Pre-Mix and Walla Works Studio (Foley)

Design

- Art direction & Design: Jun Misaki
- Photographer: Kenji Tsukagoshi
