= Are You "Fried Chickenz"?? =

Compilation album by Gackt
- Released: June 23, 2010
- Genres: Alternative rock, art rock, hard rock, neo-prog, symphonic rock
- Length: 63:00
- Label: Nippon Crown
- Producer: Gackt

Gackt chronology
Re:Born (2009)	Are You "Fried Chickenz"?? (2010)	The Eleventh Day: Single Collection (2010)

Are You "Fried Chickenz"?? is the fifth compilation album by Japanese recording artist Gackt, released on June 23, 2010 by his former label Nippon Crown. First a solo project, it became a newly formed rock band named Yellow Fried Chickenz (abbreviated as YFC), which besides Japan two times toured Europe between 2010-2011, and released a few live and studio recordings until disbandment in 2012. They resumed activity in 2024 as Gackt Yellow Fried Chickenz and started touring worldwide, for now in Latin America, Asia and Europe.

== Yellow Fried Chickenz ==
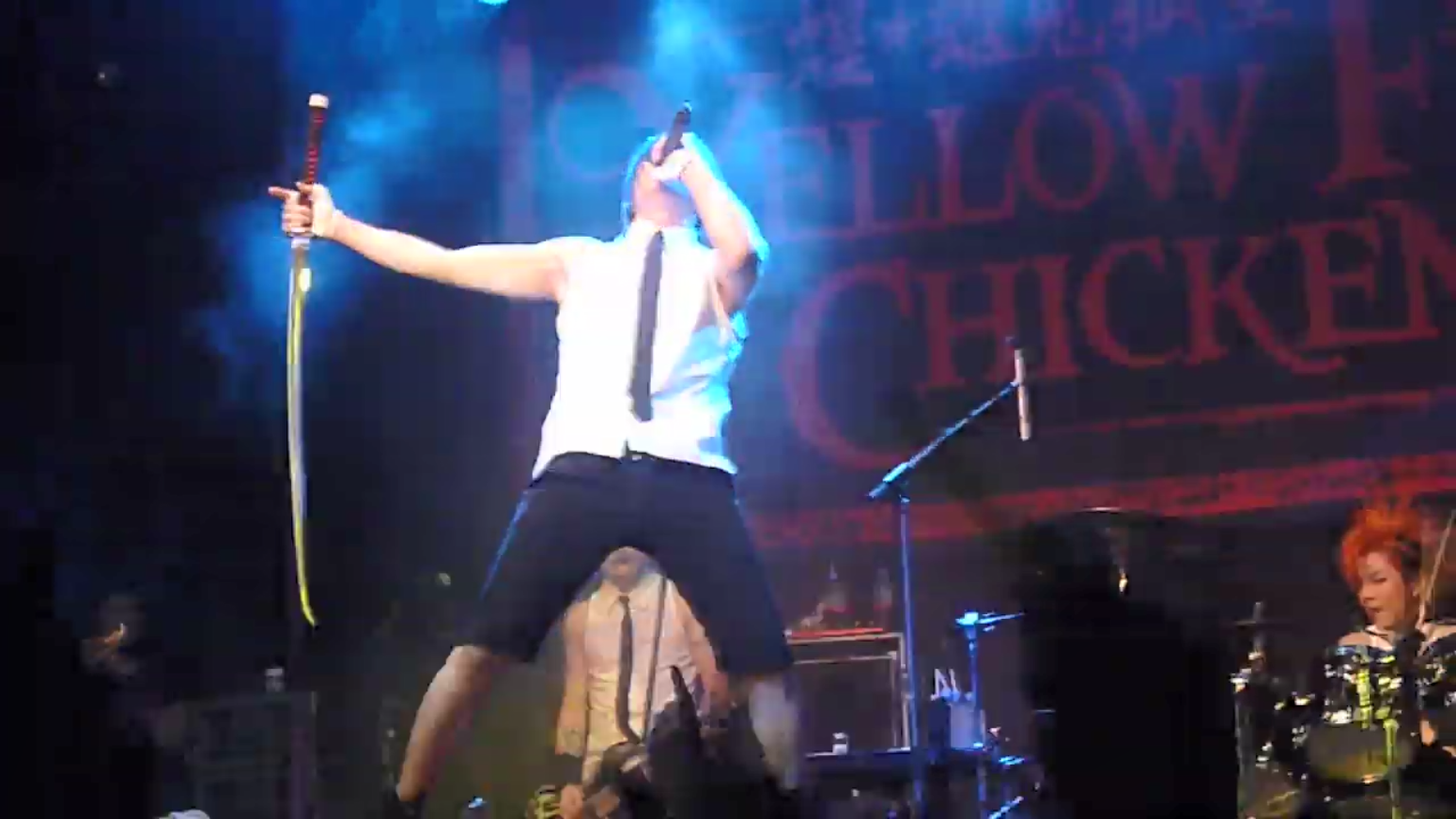
Gackt performing with Yellow Fried Chickenz in Barcelona, 2010.

Prior to the transfer announcement to Avex Group in 2010, separately from Gackt's solo career, he organized a band, "Yellow Fried Chickenz", whose name refers to human cowardice. Although in the beginning it was meant to be a solo project, a new band was founded. Due to similarity of YFC with KFC, as a pun band's first DVD cover features Gackt stealing a Colonel Sanders statue from a restaurant, exclaiming "we're gonna dye KFC and the world the color of YFC!".

The first event by the band was the male-only concert on March 21, 2010, at Kawasaki's Citta Club, in an attempt to bolster "men's spirit ... and sexuality" against the so-called herbivore men masculinity in Japan's society. Besides the nationwide tour in June and August (including a female-only swimsuit concert), from July 16, Gackt with the band made his first appearance touring Europe, performing at sold-out clubs in London, Paris, Barcelona, Munich, and Bochum, gathering an audience of 5,000 people.

Since June 2011, the band line-up besides Gackt as a vocalist, You Kurosaki and Chachamaru on guitars, also included a second vocalist Jon (Fade), third guitarist Takumi, while on drums Shinya Yamada (Luna Sea), and on bass guitar U:Zo (former Rize). In July and August 2011, the band toured Europe for the second time, visiting 9 countries and performing 14 shows, starting on July 20–21 at Bataclan in Paris, including also first time performances in Cologne, Amsterdam, Toulouse, Berlin, Budapest, Warsaw, Leipzig, Stockholm, and ending on 11 August at Ray Just Arena, Moscow, gathering an audience of 20,000 people in total. Then he toured across Japan. Both tours' revenue was donated to the Japanese Red Cross for the victims of the Tōhoku earthquake and tsunami. In September 2011 performed at the V-Rock Festival at Saitama Super Arena. A year later on July 4, 2012, at the concert in Nippon Budokan the group was disbanded.

On November 10, 2024 the band resumed activity with a new line-up as Gackt Yellow Fried Chickenz for a limited five year revival. With Gackt on vocals, it features on guitars Yohio, MiA and Hiroto, on bass guitar Daichi, and on drums Hidehiro. They performed on Kishidan Expo at Makuhari Messe, and announced Christmas concerts on December 24–25 at the Zepp Haneda. Gackt mentioned plans to tour in Asia, Europe and South America. In October 2025, a Gackt Yellow Fried Chickenz world tour was announced, starting in January 2026, and including for now dates in Japan, China, Mexico, Brazil and Chile. The concerts in Latin America were a commercial and critical success, with a sold-out Teatro Caupolicán.

In September 2026 was announced a 2027 comeback tour in Latin America, this time also including Argentina, and in October 2026, a performance on June 26, 2027 at Fate Festival in Rome, Italy.

=== Discography ===
Several recordings were released from the project band, partly credited to Gackt until mid-2011, with "#" describing their peak on Oricon charts:

- two singles "The End Of The Day" (#7) and "All My Love/You Are The Reason" (#10) in 2011,
- studio album Yellow Fried Chickenz I in 2012 (#7),
- live album Attack Of The Yellow Fried Chickenz In Europe 2010 (#50) in 2011,
- live video recordings Yellow Fried Chickenz 煌☆雄兎狐塾 ～男女混欲美濡戯祭～ (#13), The Graffiti ~Attack Of The "Yellow Fried Chickenz" In Europe～『I Love You All』 (#15) in 2011, and World Tour *Show Ur Soul.I* 世壊傷結愛魂祭 at Makuhari 2011 (#7), World Tour *Show Ur Soul.I* 世壊傷結愛魂祭 at Berlin 2011 (#17) in 2012.

The band's lyrics tend to be a combination of the Japanese and English languages, with some songs released or performed also in English ('.eu') and combined ('.com') versions, for example "Circle", You Are The Reason", "Mind Forest", "Not Alone", "Speed Master", "Ever" and "Jesus".

== Track listing ==
All lyrics are written by Gackt C.; all music is composed by Gackt C. (except M-9, M-12, M-14).

No.	Title	Length
1.	"Zan" (斬～ZAN～ "Slash")
2.	"Dybbuk"
3.	"Nine Spiral"
4.	"Speed Master"
5.	"Lu:na"
6.	"Kimi ga Matteiru Kara" (君が待っているから "Because You Are Waiting")
7.	"Mind Forest"
8.	"White Eyes"
9.	"Justified"
10.	"Jesus"
11.	"Flower"
12.	"Kagero"
13.	"Uncontrol KyoukiRanbu edition (Mar. 21, 2010 Live ver.)" (UNCONTROL ♂狂喜乱舞edition♂ (Mar. 21, 2010 LIVE ver.))
14.	"Justified (Mar. 21, 2010 Live ver.)"

== Chart performance ==
=== Oricon sales charts ===
Release	Provider(s)	Chart	Peak position	Sales total
June 23, 2010	Oricon	Weekly Albums	10	12,404
June 23, 2010	Oricon	/	/	21,514

=== Billboard Japan ===
Provider(s)	Chart	Peak position
Billboard	Top Albums	9
