= Ever (song) =

- CD-only version cover

Single by Gackt
- B-side: "Uncontrol Kyoukiranbu edition"
- Released: July 28, 2010
- Genre: Rock, Electronic rock
- Length: 19:22
- Label: Avex Entertainment
- Songwriter(s): Gackt C.
- Producer(s): Gackt

Gackt singles chronology
"Stay the Ride Alive" (2010)	"Ever" (2010)	"Episode.0" (2011)

Music video
- "Ever" on YouTube

"Ever" is the thirty-eighth single released by Japanese solo artist Gackt, released on July 28, 2010, by Avex Group. It was the theme song for the multiplayer online role-playing video game Dragon Nest.

== Summary ==
On April 17, it was officially announced that Gackt would leave the record company Nippon Crown with whom he was signed for more than a decade, and would transfer to Avex Group, with whom he had previously collaborated on the Kamen Rider Decade series.

In addition he had begun a new nationwide tour, almost the same day was announced that is going to tour Europe that summer, and for the first time to perform a live concert outside Asia. The song "Ever" was first performed live on July 10, at the Zepp Tokyo.

The single, "Ever" was initially scheduled to be released on June 16, but it was postponed to July 28. At a press conference, it was confirmed that Gackt would do the voice-acting for the villain character Velsklud, as well singing the "Black version" theme song of the multiplayer online role-playing game Dragon Nest.

The single was released in two versions: A CD only; and a version including a DVD with the music video. Both included bonus changeable jackets, as well - in the limited edition - an extra bonus (making-of DVD), which could be obtained upon request for those who purchased both versions. Along with the A-Side theme song, Ever, the single also includes a studio recording of "Uncontrol Kyoukiranbu edition" which Gackt sang in his 2010 tour Yellow Fried Chickenz, and released a live recording of on his compilation album Are You "Fried Chickenz"?? (2010). The song "Ever" was covered in English by Gackt's band Yellow Fried Chickenz's and performed live including at Makuhari Messe in 2011, released on DVD recording World Tour *Show Ur Soul.I* 世壊傷結愛魂祭 at Makuhari 2011 in 2012.

== Music video ==
The music video for the single features the same performers from the "Setsugekka -the end of silence-" video, Shun from DuelJewel on guitar, Ni-ya from Nightmare on bass, Tsukasa from D'espairsRay on drums, and You Kurosaki, his friend and from supporting live band, fill the second guitarist spot.

== Track listings and formats ==
All tracks are written by Gackt C

CD single (YICQ-10002)
No.	Title	Length
1.	"Ever"	5:15
2.	""Uncontrol Kyoukiranbu edition" (Uncontrol ♂狂喜乱舞edition♂)"	4:27
3.	"Ever (instrumental)"	5:14
4.	"Uncontrol Kyoukiranbu edition (instrumental)"	4:26

CD + DVD (YICQ-10001)
No.	Title	Length
1.	"Ever (Music Film)"

== Charts ==
Oricon

Release	Provider(s)	Chart	Peak position	Sales total
July 28, 2010	Oricon	Weekly Singles	4	32,795
July 28, 2010	Oricon	Monthly Singles	19	41,350
July 28, 2010	Oricon	Yearly Singles	127	52,825

Billboard Japan

Chart (2010)	Peak position
Billboard Japan Hot 100	18
