= The Seventh Night: Unplugged =

The Seventh Night Unplugged

Compilation album by Gackt
- Released: May 26, 2004
- Genre: Folk rock, art rock, alternative rock
- Length: 57:44
- Label: Nippon Crown

Gackt chronology
The Sixth Day (2004)	The Seventh Night; Unplugged (2004)	Love Letter (2005)

The Seventh Night: Unplugged is a compilation album released by Gackt on May 26, 2004. It contains acoustic arrangements of previously released songs and complements The Sixth Day, a single collection released three months earlier. The unplugged theme of The Seventh Night would be continued by Gackt's subsequent album, Love Letter. A similarly themed single collection was released in 2010 as The Eleventh Day.

== Release ==
The album was released on May 26, 2004, by Nippon Crown. In the initial counting week of June it reached number five on the Oricon chart, with sales of 42,105 copies. In the upcoming week, it was at number twelve respectively, with sales of 13,518. It charted for 8 weeks, and sold over 100,000 copies, certified Gold by RIAJ.

== Track listing ==
No.	Title	Length
1.	"Kimi no Tame ni Dekiru Koto (君のためにできること)"	4:50
2.	"Mind Forest"	5:40
3.	"Kimi Ga Matte Iru Kara (君が待っているから)"	6:04
4.	"Hoshi no Suna (星の砂)"	5:25
5.	"Kono Daremo Inai Heya De (この誰もいない部屋で)"	6:12
6.	"U+K"	2:29
7.	"Papa Lapped a Pap Lopped"	3:00
8.	"Mirror"	4:42
9.	"Uncertain Memory"	5:39
10.	"Kimi Ga Oikaketa Yume (君が追いかけた夢)"	7:09
11.	"Last Song"	6:34
