= The Sixth Day: Single Collection =

The Sixth Day Single Collection

Compilation album by Gackt
- Released: February 25, 2004
- Recorded: 1999–2003
- Genre: Alternative rock, pop rock, art rock, neo-prog
- Length: 63:44
- Label: Nippon Crown

Gackt chronology
Crescent (2003)	The Sixth Day; Single Collection (2004)	The Seventh Night (2004)

The Sixth Day: Single Collection is a compilation album released by Gackt on February 25, 2004. The album collects the artist's previous single's title songs from 1999 up to 2003, some of them having been re-recorded for this release. The Sixth Day complements The Seventh Night, an unplugged album released three months later. In 2010, Gackt also released The Eleventh Day: Single Collection, which covers the material from 2004 to 2009.

== Release ==
The album was released on February 25, 2004, by Nippon Crown. In the second counting week of March it reached number three on the Oricon chart, with sales of 106,412 copies. In the upcoming two weeks, it was at number eight and ten respectively, with sales of 32,174 and 15,227 copies. It charted for 23 weeks, Gackt's album record, and with sales of 196,458 copies, was the 78th best-selling album of the year, certified Platinum by RIAJ.

== Track listing ==
No.	Title	Length
1.	"Oasis"	5:26
2.	"Sekirei: Seki-ray (鶺鴒〜seki-ray〜)"	4:25
3.	"Secret Garden"	4:37
4.	"Kimi Ga Oikaketa Yume (君が追いかけた夢)"	4:20
5.	"Wasurenai Kara (忘れないから)"	4:43
6.	"Tsuki no Uta (月(TSUKI)の(no)詩(UTA))"	4:47
7.	"Mirror"	4:49
8.	"Vanilla"	4:16
9.	"Mizerable"	4:51
10.	"Lu:na"	3:29
11.	"Last Song"	4:46
12.	"Another World"	3:05
13.	"Kimi no Tame ni Dekiru Koto (君のためにできること)"	4:16
14.	"Saikai (Story) (再会〜Story〜)"	5:53
