= Platinum Box I =

PLATINUM BOX 〜I〜

Video by Gackt
- Released: December 16, 2000
- Recorded: 2000
- Genres: Alternative rock, Pop rock, pop
- Length: 100:06
- Label: Nippon Crown

Gackt chronology
MARS – Visitor From the Sky – Flashbacks (2000)	PLATINUM BOX 〜I〜 (2000)	Saisei to shuuen (VHS) (2001)

PLATINUM BOX I is a VHS tape released by Japanese singer Gackt on December 16, 2000. Included with the VHS tape is an audio recording of the MARS 空からの訪問者〜回想〜 Concert performed by Gackt in 2000.

== VHS Content ==
1. 鶺鴒～seki-ray～ [SEKI RAY ~seki-ray~]
2. 鶺鴒～seki-ray～ [SEKI RAY ~seki-ray~] (making of)
3. 再会〜Story〜 [Saikai 〜Story〜]
4. 再会〜Story〜 [Saikai 〜Story〜] (making of)
5. Christmas message from Gackt

== Track listing CD ==
1. "Ares" – 1:54
2. "Asrun Dream" – 5:58
3. "絵夢〜for my dear〜" [Emu–for my dear–] 6:12
4. "Illness Illusion" – 3:27
5. "鶺鴒～seki-ray～" [Sekirei-seki-ray-] – 4:55
6. "freesia〜op.1〜" – 4:10
7. "freesia〜op.2〜" – 2:31
8. "Blue" – 4:45
9. "OASIS" – 4:52
10. "Mirror" – 8:03
11. "U+K" – 5:30
12. "Vanilla" – 4:15
13. "dears" – 5:27
14. "この誰もいない部屋で" [Kono daremo inai heya de] – 16:50

== Notes ==
- Studio recordings of most of these songs can be found on Gackt's first album, MARS.
