= No ni Saku Hana no Yō ni =

Single by Gackt
- Released: February 7, 2007
- Recorded: 2006
- Genre: Folk rock
- Length: 26:30
- Label: Nippon Crown
- Songwriter: Gackt C.
- Producer: Gackt

Gackt singles chronology
| "Love Letter" (2006) | "No ni Saku Hana no Yō ni" (2007) | "Returner (Yami no Shūen)" (2007) |

Music video
- "No ni Saku Hana no Yō ni" on YouTube

"No ni Saku Hana no Yō ni" (野に咲く花のように) is a single released by Gackt on February 7, 2007, under Nippon Crown. It peaked at third place on the Oricon Singles Chart and charted for eleven weeks.

== Overview ==
The song, translated "Like a Wild Flower", was first performed on February 28, 2006, when Gackt appeared at the graduation of the Maiko High School in Hyōgo Prefecture, because of a promise he gave to a student. He received a letter by student who was worried that his school's department would shut down due to lack of student interest. Their division managed to survive and Gackt wrote the song and performed it at that year's graduation ceremony in honor of their perseverance.

Since then he continued to make annual surprise appearances in high school graduation ceremonies, where encourage students to follow their dreams, and performs the song.

In 2012 when speaking to the graduates said "As you leave this place, I want you to become a person who will be able to push the backs of other people. With these feelings, I will gift my song ... Dreams aren't something you see. Dreams are something you fulfill. I am looking forward to your futures! Congratulations on graduating!".

== Track listing ==
| No. | Title | Length |
|---|---|---|
| 1. | "No ni Saku Hana no Yō ni (野に咲く花のように)" | 5:36 |
| 2. | "No ni Saku Hana no Yō ni (Minna no Uta)" | 4:27 |
| 3. | "No ni Saku Hana no Yō ni (PF Style)" | 5:29 |
| 4. | "No ni Saku Hana no Yō ni (Instrumental)" | 5:36 |
| 5. | "No ni Saku Hana no Yō ni (PF Solo)" | 5:22 |
