= Gackt =

Japanese singer-songwriter and actor (born 1973)

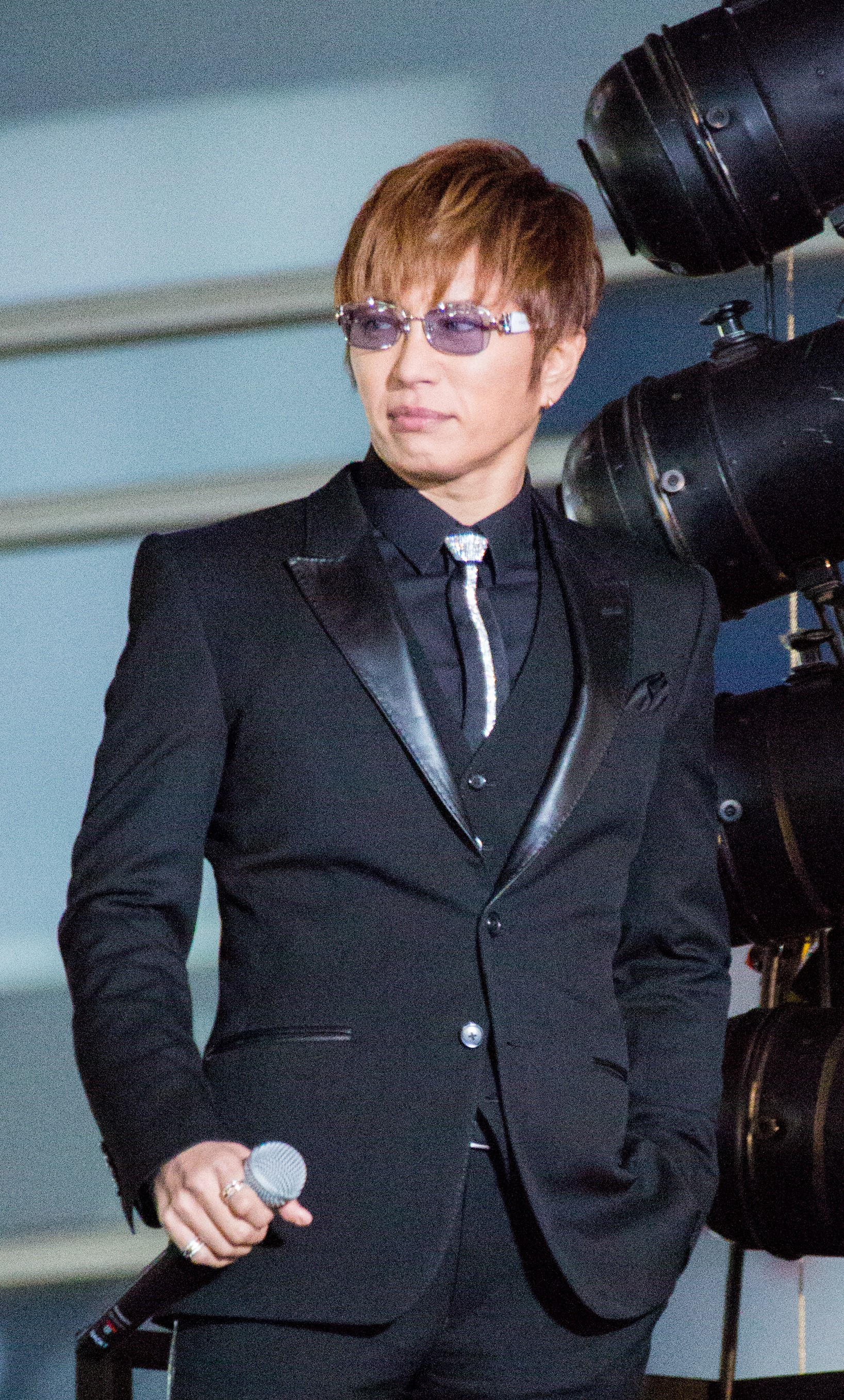
- Gackt in 2017

Background information
- Also known as: Gackt Camui (神威 楽斗, Kamui Gakuto)
- Born: Gakuto Oshiro (大城 ガクト, Ōshiro Gakuto); July 4, 1973 (age 53); Okinawa, Japan
- Origin: Tokyo, Japan
- Genres: Rock; pop
- Occupations: Singer-songwriter; musician; record producer; actor
- Instruments: Vocals; piano; guitar; drums
- Works: Gackt discography
- Years active: 1993–2021, 2022–present
- Labels: G&Lovers; Gan-Shin; Nippon Crown; Avex Group
- Formerly of: Malice Mizer; S.K.I.N.; Yellow Fried Chickenz
- Website: gackt.com

Gakuto Oshiro (大城 ガクト, Ōshiro Gakuto; born July 4, 1973), (Note: Gackt's exact birth name was publicly unknown until 2017. For a certain period of time was considered that Gackt Camui (神威 楽斗, Kamui Gakuto) was his real name, but ASCAP, beside "Gackt" and "Gackt C," listed Gakuto Oshiro, which are a Japanese given name and surname. They were confirmed by Gackt on December 26, 2017. His year of birth, 1973, was also unknown until November 5, 2009, and instead his public profile used 1540. This was a remnant of his claim to be a vampire from his early career.) better known as Gackt (stylized in all caps), (Note: On June 4, 2009, in commemoration of his solo career's 10th anniversary, his stage name "Gackt" became stylized in all-capital letters as "GACKT".) is a Japanese singer-songwriter, musician, record producer and actor.

Born in Okinawa to a Ryukyuan family, Gackt learned the piano at a young age and was raised on classical music and enka before becoming interested in rock music while attending high school. He has been active since 1993, first as the frontman of the short-lived independent band Cains:Feel, and then from 1995 the now-defunct visual kei rock band Malice Mizer. Gackt started his solo career in 1999 with debut mini-album Mizérable and first full-length album Mars (2000). He has released nine studio albums and, with forty-eight singles released, holds the male soloist record for most top ten consecutive singles in Japanese music history. They are mostly conceived around two conceptual stories "Moon Saga" (Moon, Crescent, Diabolos, Last Moon) and "Requiem et Reminiscence" (Rebirth, Re:Born) which are performed live in uniquely elaborate concerts. His single "Returner (Yami no Shūen)" (2007), is his first and only single to reach the number one spot on the Oricon charts. As a solo artist, Gackt has sold over 10 million records. In 2007 became a founding member of S.K.I.N., a Japanese visual kei rock supergroup, and in 2010 formed his own band project Yellow Fried Chickenz with which is touring worldwide.

Besides being established in the modern entertainment industry and considered a pop icon, Gackt's music has been used as theme songs for video games (Dirge of Cerberus: Final Fantasy VII), video game films (Dragon Age: Dawn of the Seeker), anime series/films (New Fist of the North Star, Mobile Suit Zeta Gundam, Texhnolyze and Trickster) and television series (Kamen Rider Decade). In addition to his music career, Gackt has voice acted (including characters inspired by him in video games like in Bujingai and Genesis Rhapsodos in Crisis Core: Final Fantasy VII), and live acted in a few films, including a film he wrote, Moon Child, his international debut Bunraku, Japan Academy award nomination performance for Best Actor in Fly Me to the Saitama, and TV series most notably as Uesugi Kenshin in the NHK drama Fūrin Kazan. He also performed live in theatre stage plays, Nemuri Kyoshiro Buraihikae and a duology he has written, composed, and directed Moon Saga: Mysteries of Yoshitsune I & II. He also provided the voice samples for Internet Co., Ltd.'s first Vocaloid, Gackpoid.

== Early life ==
Gackt was born on July 4, 1973, as the second of three children in a Ryukyuan family, in Okinawa of the Ryukyu Islands, Japan. His father was a music teacher, who primarily played the trumpet, and his mother was also a teacher. Gackt has an older sister and a younger brother. He lived in Okinawa until he was 7 years old (with short periods when was 16 and 26), because of his father's job, living in many different cities on Honshu and Kyushu islands in addition to Okinawa: Yamaguchi, Fukuoka, Shiga, Osaka, and Kyoto. He studied in the Moriyama High School in Shiga, and was enrolled in the Kyoto Gakuen University.

Gackt's musical education began at age three when his parents initiated his classical piano education. At age seven, continuing his classical piano education became more difficult because of time spent at elementary school and the repeated change of instructors due to relocating from city to city. It would take another four years until his parents allowed him to quit lessons. However, after losing a piano competition to a boy he met in the middle school, Gackt voluntarily returned to his piano studies, even writing orchestral scores. He has credited the classical pianist and composer Frédéric Chopin with being "the one who taught me the beauty, depth, fun, sadness, the kindness of music; that music could grant people courage, and the meaning of the layers of sound. It isn't an exaggeration to say Chopin is the foundation of my music". Since his father played the trumpet, Gackt is also familiar with brass instruments. Having only listened to classical music and enka while growing up, he did not become interested in rock music until high school, and went on to master modern percussion.

== Music career ==
=== 1993–1998: First musical efforts and Malice Mizer ===
In the early 1990s, Gackt was working as a host and dealer in a casino, while also being an assistant drummer for an amateur band. At the time he wanted to become more serious about his music activity but had a negative perspective on life. While at the casino, he met a businessman who inspired him to find a purpose in life, that being music. About a year later he left the band and he found himself working multiple jobs, among them as a sound technician at a studio where he could practice drums. When Gackt was twenty-years old, he met guitarist You Kurosaki, his future solo career support guitarist, at a music live house in Kyoto. They formed the band, Cains:Feel, whose name had biblical reference to the story of Cain and Abel. The group lacked a vocalist, so Gackt became the frontman, and the band went to record a demo tape before disbanding.

In 1995, he was introduced to the visual kei band Malice Mizer which was on hiatus due to the departure of their frontman Tetsu. Gackt moved to Tokyo and joined them in October 1995. As their vocalist, pianist and primary lyricist on studio albums Voyage Sans Retour (1996) and Merveilles (1998), he also contributed three songs in their catalog, "Regret", "Hamon" and "Le Ciel", the latter being their most successful single as a band.

During this time, the band's fame soared; and, after four years and two studio albums, in January 1999, it was officially announced that he left the band. According to his interviews and autobiography, the issues with the management office, members' differences, and his isolation from the band led to his departure.

=== 1999–2001: Solo debut, Mizérable, Mars, and Rebirth ===
Gackt launched his solo career on January 1, 1999. After completing his recordings, his first gig as a solo artist was the 99 Gackt Resurrection tour held in 11 locations across Japan. It was followed on May 12 with his debut release, the extended play Mizérable, released by Nippon Crown. The album peaked at number two, spending 12 weeks on the Oricon charts. It spanned the same-titled single "Mizérable", which peaked at number three, spending nine weeks on the charts. In July, he performed at Shock Wave Illusion in Osaka and Tokyo. On August 11, Gackt released his second single, "Vanilla". It peaked at number four, spent 10 weeks on the charts, and enjoyed considerable success. It was certified gold by the Recording Industry Association of Japan (RIAJ).

In 2000, on February 9 and 16, the third and fourth singles were released, "Mirror" and "Oasis". They peaked at number nine and number seven, respectively, and both spent six weeks on the charts. His fifth single was released on March 8, "Seki-Ray", which peaked at number seven, charting for six weeks. At the beginning of the year, Gackt was joined by support guitarist and associate producer Chachamaru. For Caparison Guitars, Gackt designed two guitars, named "Marcury" and "Venus", which he occasionally uses in his live performances. On April 26, his first full-length studio album, Mars, was released. It peaked at number three, spent five weeks on the charts, and was certified gold by RIAJ. The following day Gackt went on a nationwide tour Mars Sora Kara no Homonsha -Kaisō-, which included 16 concerts, and on July 1, he performed the final concert at Yokohama Arena. On August 30, the sixth single, "Saikai (Story)", was released. It peaked at number seven, spending six weeks on the charts. The seventh single, "Secret Garden", was released on November 16; it reached number ten, and charted for five weeks. On December 16, 2000, Gackt released the first in the series of Platinum Boxes.

In 2001, on March 14, Gackt released his eighth single, "Kimi no Tame ni Dekiru Koto", which peaked at number six, and charted for 18 weeks, Gackt's longest-charted single until 2009. On April 25, the second studio album, Rebirth was released. It was Gackt's first concept album, conceived around a fictional narrative during the time of World War II, named "Requiem et Reminiscence". The album includes previously released singles "Seki-Ray" and "Secret Garden". It peaked at number three, spent 21 weeks on the charts. On May 3, Gackt went on the Requiem et Reminiscence tour, which included 18 concerts at fourteen venues. The final concert was held on June 23 at the Yokohama Arena. His ninth single, "Another World" was released on September 5. It was Gackt's first single to reach number two spot on the charts, spent 17 weeks on them, and managed to sell over two hundred and fifty thousand copies.

After the events of September 11th, 2001, in New York, Gackt wrote a song for a world peace. It was released December 2001 as a single, "Jūnigatsu no Love Song". It peaked at number five and charted for nine weeks. From 2001 to 2004, the single was recorded in Japanese, English, Chinese and Korean, which were all released before Christmas. In the same month on TV performed in duet with Ayumi Hamasaki the B'z's popular song "Itsuka no Merry Christmas", and again with Namie Amuro the next year. On New Year's Eve, Gackt's performance of "Another World" was his first participation at the annual music show, the 52nd Kōhaku Uta Gassen.

=== 2002–2003: Moon and Crescent ===
In the second half of 2001, during the release of "Another World", Gackt started his second concept, project "Moon Saga". In 2002, on April 24, he released his eleventh single "Wasurenai Kara". It peaked at number four, spending five weeks on the charts. On June 6, Gackt went on the nationwide live house tour which represented his new concept and included nine concerts at eight venues. The final concert was held on July 10, at Zepp Sendai. On June 16, the third studio concept album Moon was released. It is Gackt's best-selling album, reached number two on the charts, and was certified gold by RIAJ. On September 22, 2002, at the Beijing Worker's Gymnasium, in China, a large musical event "China-Japan: Holding Hands, Moving Together" was held as part of "Japan-China Diplomatic Relations Normalization 30th Anniversary Commemoration", and Gackt was among the handful who represented his homeland. On October 14, he continued the concept with the nationwide tour Kagen no Tsuki (下弦の月, The Waning Moon), which included 22 concerts among fifteen venues. The final concert was held on December 24, at the Yokohama Arena. On New Year's Eve, Gackt performed "Jūnigatsu no Love Song" at the 53rd Kōhaku Uta Gassen.

On March 19, his thirteenth single, "Kimi ga Oikaketa Yume", was released, which is the second of five to reach number two on the charts, spending 10 weeks on them. It was certified gold by RIAJ. On May 4 the nationwide tour Jōgen no Tsuki (上弦の月, The Waxing Moon) was launched, continuing the concept of the previous one, and included 13 concerts at eight venues. On June 11, the fourteenth single, "Tsuki no Uta", was released and was ending theme for anime Texhnolyze. It peaked at number three, and it was certified gold by RIAJ. On July 6, the final concert of the tour was held at the Yokohama Arena. On August 16 headlined the All Night Nippon summer festival organized by Nippon Broadcasting System. On September 26, Gackt released his autobiography Confession (自白, Jihaku). On September 27, he performed as a special guest at the TV Asahi 45th anniversary commemorative "Kingdom Rock Show". On October 2, Gackt performed the John Lennon song "Love", at the "Dream Power: John Lennon Super Live" concert organized by Yoko Ono in Saitama Super Arena. Besides the film and musical recordings for the project, in October he published a novel Moon Child Requiem (Moon Child 鎮魂歌). On November 12, the sixteenth single, "Last Song", was released and peaked at number five. It spent 13 weeks on the charts and was certified gold by RIAJ. On December 3, the fourth studio concept album, Crescent, was released. It also peaked at number five, through 11 weeks on the charts, and was certified platinum by RIAJ. It included his movie Moon Child theme song "Orange no Taiyō" (オレンジの太陽, Orenji no Taiyō; "The Orange Sun") which sang with co-star Hyde (singer of L'Arc-en-Ciel). On New Year's Eve, Gackt performed "Last Song" at the 54th Kōhaku Uta Gassen.

=== 2004–2005: The Sixth Day and The Seventh Night, Love Letter, Diabolos and Tokyo Dome ===
In February 2004, his first compilation album, The Sixth Day: Single Collection was released. It peaked at number three, spent 23 weeks on the charts, and was certified platinum by RIAJ. On April 29, Gackt went on the nationwide tour The Sixth Day & Seventh Night, which included 15 concerts in eight venues. In May, Gackt released another compilation album, The Seventh Night: Unplugged, containing the acoustic arrangements of previously released songs. It peaked at number five, spent eight weeks on the charts, and was certified gold by RIAJ. On July 4 was held the final concert of the tour at the Yokohama Arena. In October, the eighteenth single, "Kimi ni Aitakute", was released. It peaked at number two, spent 17 weeks on the charts, and was certified gold by RIAJ. In December, he appeared and performed at the M.net/Km Music Video Festival, where he received the award for "Best Asian Rock Artist". On New Year's Eve, Gackt performed "Kimi ni Aitakute" at the 55th Kōhaku Uta Gassen.

In January 2005, Gackt released the single "Arittake no Ai de", which peaked at number seven, and his fifth studio album, Love Letter, on Valentine's Day. It peaked at number five, spent 13 weeks on the charts, was certified gold by RIAJ, and was re-recorded in Korean and released in June for the Korean market. In April he returned to dark rock style and "Moon Saga" with the single "Black Stone". The single peaked at number three and was certified gold by RIAJ. In May, his twenty-second single, "Metamorphoze", was used in the movie Mobile Suit Zeta Gundam. It was his fourth single to reach number two, spent 13 weeks on the charts, and was certified gold by RIAJ. In August, Gackt released his twenty-third single, "Todokanai Ai to Shitteita no ni Osaekirezu ni Aishitsuzuketa...". It peaked at number three and was certified gold by RIAJ. In September, his sixth studio album, Diabolos, was released. Conceptually, it was a prequel to the previous "Moon Saga" albums. It reached number four on the charts and was certified gold by RIAJ. Gackt launched his nationwide tour, Diabolos ~Aien no Shi~, including 36 concerts across Japan, which ended with a final Christmas Eve spectacle at the Tokyo Dome, in front of more than forty-two thousand people and costing 500 million Yen (roughly $4.3 million).

=== 2006–2007: First solo tours in Asia, international releases and S.K.I.N. ===
In 2006, he continued his tour with a concert on January 14, in Korea, at Fencing Stadium in Korean Olympic Park, which was his first Asian solo concert. In the same month his twenty-fourth single, "Redemption" was released, which included theme songs "Redemption" and "Longing" of the Square Enix game, Dirge of Cerberus: Final Fantasy VII. On February 28, he appeared at the graduation of the Maiko High School in Hyōgo Prefecture. Besides the words of encouragement, he performed an unreleased song especially written for the graduation. It was released the following year on February 7, as "No ni Saku Hana no Yō ni". Since then he continued to appear in graduation ceremonies, with 16 performances by 2025.

In August, at an Otakon conference, it was publicly announced that he would form a rock supergroup, S.K.I.N., with X Japan drummer Yoshiki, Luna Sea guitarist Sugizo, and guitarist Miyavi. The group had an ambitious vision to be the first Asian band to conquer the world charts. On December 24, Gackt went on a small nationwide fan club tour Training Days – Dears Reserved Unique Gackt (D.r.u.g./Drug) Party, which also continued with four concerts in Korea and Taiwan in January 2007. The tour, being his first livehouse tour since going solo, had a specific theme as while performing rock songs embraced an all-out androgynous style approach.

On June 20, Gackt released his twenty-seventh single, "Returner (Yami no Shūen)", which was the first in his career (both solo and as a member of a band) to reach the number one spot on the Oricon charts. Its music and video were inspired by the NHK Taiga drama Fūrin Kazan in which Gackt played Uesugi Kenshin. The supergroup S.K.I.N. made debut performance on June 29, 2007 at Long Beach Arena, California, but no further activities were announced. On 10 October, he held a press conference at the Apple Store in Ginza, Tokyo, where besides advertising the first iPhone, Gackt announced he would have his entire back catalog, with new, previously toured, live song recordings, put up on the iTunes Store, as well as that "The Greatest Filmography" would be released on October 9 in the United States and Canada. His album Diabolos was released on October 26 in eighteen European countries.

On November 17 and 27, he performed at M.net/Km Music Video Festival in Korea as a special guest star, and he appeared and performed at the 2007 Japan-China Cultural Exchange Grand Concert Final in Beijing where sang "Jūnigatsu no Love Song" in Japanese, Korean, and Mandarin. On December 19, Gackt released a compilation album, 0079–0088, including songs used in the Gundam franchise. Gackt also performed at the 58th Kōhaku Uta Gassen.

=== 2008–2009: Requiem et Reminiscence II tour and Re:Born ===
In December 2008, Gackt returned to the story of "Requiem et Reminiscence", releasing his twenty-eighth single "Jesus". It peaked at number seven, spending 10 weeks on the charts. On December 14, Gackt went on his longest nationwide tour, Requiem et Reminiscence II -Saisei to Kaikō- (Requiem et Reminiscence II -再生と邂逅-, -Rebirth and Reunion-), which included over 60 concerts in more than 45 cities, reaching an audience of over 210,000 spectators.

On January 28, 2009, his twenty-ninth single "Ghost" was released, and peaked at number six on the charts. On May 18, Gackt was scheduled to perform a concert in South Korea at Seoul's Olympic Hall, but due to the effects of the global recession, the sponsors of the concert withdrew their support. In commemoration of his 10th anniversary as a solo artist, Gackt released four singles: "Koakuma Heaven", "Faraway", "Lost Angels", and "Flower", one week after another, starting from June 17 and ending on July 1. They all managed to enter the top ten on the charts. On June 13, Gackt began the arena part of the tour, and on July 4 held a fanclub concert to celebrate his birthday at the Yoyogi National Stadium. On July 11 and 12, he held the final concerts at the Saitama Super Arena.

As both Gackt and the Kamen Rider Series' Heisei period run had its 10th anniversary, he became involved in the 2009 edition of the franchise, Kamen Rider Decade, to perform its theme songs. These are the first singles that were not written by him, and were released by Avex Trax and Avex Entertainment. In March, his thirtieth single and the series' opening theme, "Journey Through the Decade", was released, peaking at number two and spending 25 weeks on the charts, and certified platinum by RIAJ. In August, he released the second theme single for the Kamen Rider Decade film All Riders vs. Dai-Shocker, "The Next Decade". It peaked at number four and spent nine weeks on the charts. He also appeared in the film as Decade's iteration of the character Jōji Yūki. The collaboration finished in January 2010 with the release of the final single, "Stay the Ride Alive", which charted the same as his previous one.

In September, he performed as a representative of Japan at the Asia Song Festival at Seoul World Cup Stadium in Korea. In September he also participated in the 2009 Animelo Summer Live concert. In October, Gackt performed as the main artist in the Wow Live! Thanks For Music show held in Yoyogi National Gymnasium, in Japan. On December 2, he released his seventh studio album, Re:Born, which also featured RR II story related audio drama. It reached number nine on the charts. On December 9 was released his thirty-six single "Setsugekka (The End of Silence)/Zan", it reached Top 5 on the charts. On December 12, he held a fanclub cover concert conceptualized around fictional school, "Camui Gakuen", at the Saitama Super Arena.

=== 2010–2011: The Eleventh Day, move to Avex Group and Yellow Fried Chickenz ===
In 2010, on February 14, Gackt participated as a representative of Japan at the Asia Pops Festival held in Niigata, in homage for the victims of 2007 Chūetsu earthquake. On March 6 and 7, he performed the theme songs "Setsugekka (The End of Silence)/Zan" at the festival organized by Koei to promote their new Wii game, Samurai Warriors 3, at the Saitama Super Arena. On April 17, he officially announced that he transferred from Nippon Crown to Avex Group's recording conglomerate.

Gackt performing with Yellow Fried Chickenz in Barcelona, 2010

Prior to the transferring to Avex, he organized a band project Yellow Fried Chickenz, whose name refers to human cowardice, that included Chachamaru and Shinya Yamada. Besides the nationwide tour in June and August, from July 16, he made his first appearance touring Europe, performing sold-out dates in London, Paris, Barcelona, Munich, and Bochum. On July 21, Nippon Crown released The Eleventh Day: Single Collection, a compilation of Gackt's singles from the second half of his tenure with Nippon Crown.

In July and August 2011, Gackt toured Europe for the second time with Yellow Fried Chickenz, and later toured across Japan. In Europe, he visited 9 countries and performed 14 shows, starting on July 20–21 at Bataclan in Paris, including also first time performance in Cologne, Amsterdam, Toulouse, Berlin, Budapest, Warsaw, Leipzig, Stockholm, and ending on 11 August at Ray Just Arena, Moscow. They gathered an audience of 20,000 people. On July 4, 2012, at a concert at the Nippon Budokan, Yellow Fried Chickenz disbanded.

=== 2012–2014: Best of the Best tour, and move to independent G&Lovers ===
On March 18 and 19, 2012, Gackt appeared at the Gala party for FilmAid Asia, and the 6th Asian Film Awards, where he also performed, as part of Hong Kong International Film Festival in Hong Kong. On March 29, Gackt performed the national anthem Kimigayo at the Major League Baseball season opening game in Tokyo Dome. It was his fourth time performing the national anthem. On December 15, he performed at the 45th anniversary concert of All Night Nippon, at the Yoyogi National Stadium. In the same month, on December 19, his 43rd single, "White Lovers (Shiawase na Toki)", was released.

In 2013 his first national tour in four years was announced, titled Best of the Best Vol. I, which started on May 11, and ended with three consecutive shows on July 7 at the Yokohama Arena. It had an attendance of 80,000 people. In July, it was accompanied with the release of two compilation albums, Mild and Wild, including two new songs "Claymore" and "Sakura Chiru...". On December 22, the final concert of the fourth festival of cover concerts was held, which conceptualized around a fictional school, "Camui Gakuen". On December 26, a special live concert was held where Gackt performed along with the Tokyo Philharmonic Orchestra.

In 2014, since February 12, with the release of his forty-fourth single "P.S. I Love U", his records were released by his independent record label G&Lovers (G-PRO), distributed by Crown Tokuma. In August 2014 was released second novel related to the story of "Moon Saga" (also Gackt's theatre play). On October 1, Gackt released his forty-fifth single, "Akatsukizukuyo (Day Breakers)". On December 26, the second live concert with the Tokyo Philharmonic Orchestra was held.

=== 2015–2017: Last Moon and Last Visualive tour ===
In celebration of Gackt's 15th anniversary on July 1, 2015, the remix album titled, Gacktracks -Ultra DJ ReMix-, was released. It contained club remix versions of his songs done by Japanese DJs, including DJ Koo, Taku Takahashi, Tomoyuki Tanaka (FPM), Jazztronik, Marc Panther and many others. Gackt stated he personally would not decide to do the project from a musical perspective because he was not fond of EDM. He chose the DJs on a first-come, first-served basis, and, because of the great interest for participation, he believed in a second collaboration in the near future. He also expressed his concern on the decline of originality and growing irrelevance of music in modern daily life. On July 3 a release party was also held. On October 7, 2015 his forty-sixth single, "Arrow" was released. In the same month, he embarked on another small tour of cover concerts conceptualized around a fictional school, "Camui Gakuen", and with it performed on Hyde's band Vamps "Halloween Party" at Makuhari Messe, and on Niconico Super Party at the Saitama Super Arena.

His solo live tour in almost seven years, Last Visualive Saigo no Tsuki –Last Moon–, started with a fanclub only concert on March 19, 2016 at Misato City Cultural Hall in Saitama, with the first public show being held on March 21 at the Colany Hall in Yamanashi. The tour ended on July 3 with two consecutive shows at the Saitama Super Arena. Overall, a total of 42 concerts in thirty cities were held, with an audience of about 120,000 people. There were planning talks about holding a world tour. The eighth studio album Last Moon was released on April 27, 2016. The 48th single "Tsumi no Keishō (Original Sin)" (罪の継承～Original Sin～; lit. "Inheritance of Sin: Original Sin"), conceptually related to the latest album, was released on March 22, 2017.

=== 2018–2022: 20th anniversary and temporary hiatus ===
On July 4, 2018, the "Last Songs" concert was held in celebration of his 45th birthday at Shinkiba Studio Coast, Tokyo, which was broadcast live via NicoNico Live. Between October 11 and 25, eight live performances of the "Camui Gakuen" event were held. On December 31, Gackt sang the national anthem of Japan for the Japanese kickboxer Tenshin Nasukawa before his bout with American boxer Floyd Mayweather Jr. at the Saitama Super Arena. He also joined the live broadcast of Fuji TV as a special guest commentator for the main and semi-final matches. On March 22, 2019, Gackt participated as a representative of Japan at the Hong Kong Asian-Pop Music Festival. On July 4, 2019, a concert was held in celebration of his 46th birthday and 20th anniversary of solo career at Pacifico Yokohama. The 20th anniversary national tour Khaos started at Grand Cube Osaka on January 11 and ended at Fukuoka Sunpalace on February 29, 2020, a total of 20 performances in eight cities in total, with an audience of about 60,000 people. In the late 2020 provided theme song "Exterminate" for the theatre play Road59.

In June and July 2021 held a live tour "Last Songs 2021" with South Korean singer-pianist K. On September 8, 2021 it was announced that Gackt would go on an indefinite hiatus for a medical treatment of prolonged neurological disorder from childhood which caused severe dysphonia, a neurological vocal condition that prevents him from singing and other activities. In his promise of recovery vowed to make a new album and tour in the future. On May 17, 2022, it was announced that he was not fully recovered but will resume activities by the end of the year, and in January 2023 stated to feel at "80%".

=== 2023–present: Resume of activities, Demonic Symphony and world tour ===
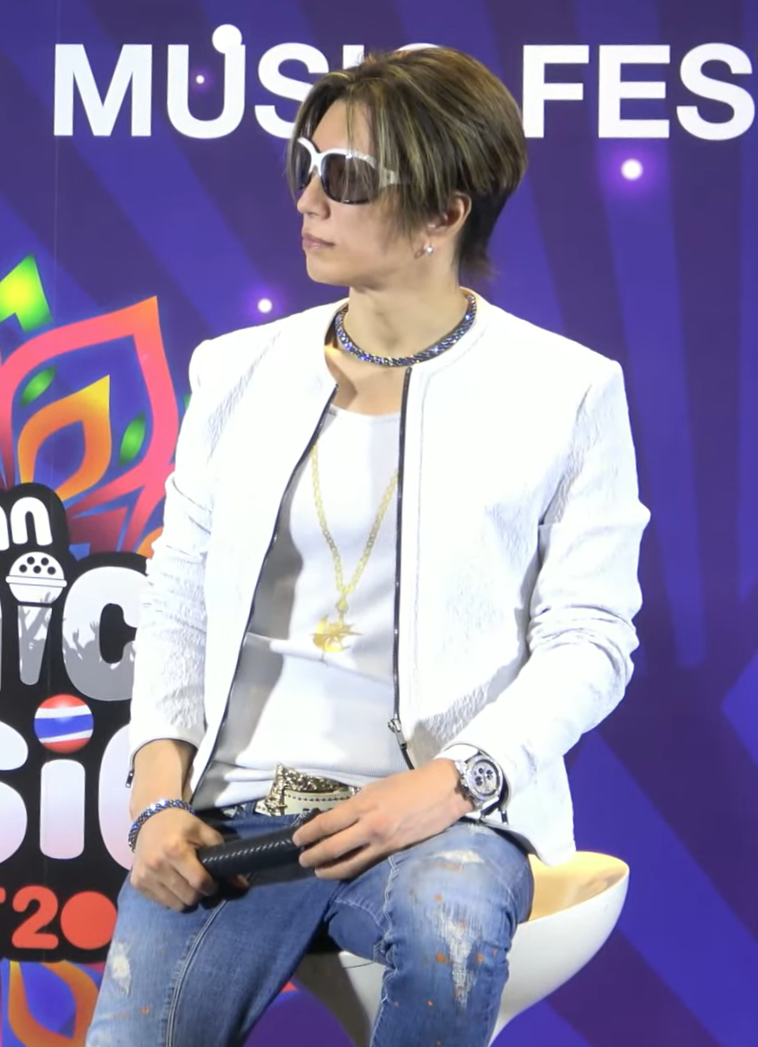
Gackt at the "Thai-Japan Iconic Music Fest", Bangkok, Thailand, 2023.

On January 28, 2023, Gackt sang the national anthem at the sumo retirement ceremony in honor of Hakuhō Shō. In March started a live tour "Last Songs 2023" with South Korean singer-pianist K with whom collaborated two years ago, performing ballads and other songs in arrangements with strings and piano. In September 2023 made a surprise appearance and talk show at the "Thai-Japan Iconic Music Fest" held at Iconsiam in Bangkok, Thailand. In November published his second autobiography Confession II (自白II, Jihaku II), and expressed desire to perform worldwide.

In February 2024, Gackt collaborated with Japanese band Tube on the single "Sayonara no Kawaii ni", which performed together at Gackt's "Last Songs 2024 feat. K" tour. It peaked at number nine on the charts. On November 10, was reformed band project, now named as Gackt Yellow Fried Chickenz, with new members and performed on Kishidan Expo at Makuhari Messe, announcing band's limited five year revival, with concerts at Zepp Haneda on December 24 and 25, and plans to tour in Asia, Europe and South America.

In 2025, in celebration of the 25th anniversary of Gackt's solo career, in March were distributed digitally live music recordings from nine*nine (2008) collection of his live tours 2000–2006 as live albums, with official live videos of "Kimi no Tame ni Dekiru Koto" (2001), "Last Song" (2004) and "Another World" (2006). In March until early April was held "Last Songs 2025 feat. K" tour, and on April 13 two performances of rock orchestral concert "Gackt Philharmonic 2025" Maō shinfonī (魔王シンフォニー, Demonic Symphony / Demon King Symphony) supported by his band Yellow Fried Chickenz and Grand Philharmonic Tokyo orchestra conducted by Yoneda Satoshi at Sumida Triphony Hall, Tokyo. The Gackt Philharmonic 2025 - Demonic Philharmony live album was released on July 4 by Universal Classics and Jazz, reaching Top 20 on the Oricon charts, with video recording released on November 11, and was held a revival concert with all-standing first floor on December 23 at the same venue. A "Gackt Philharmonic 2026" Demonic Symphony –Infinity– nationwide tour will be held in July and August 2026, and organized by Billboard Classics.

In October 2025, a Gackt Yellow Fried Chickenz world tour was announced. The tour had a starting point on January 18, 2026, at Zepp Yokohama in Japan, moving in February to Mexico City in Mexico, São Paulo in Brazil, and on February 9 Teatro Caupolicán in Santiago, Chile. The concerts in Latin America were a commercial and critical success, with a sold-out Teatro Caupolicán, including VIP soundchecks with a performance of Malice Mizer's "Au Revoir", and in setlist his first single "Mizérable" and new song "Fall Again". The world tour ended with performances on May 21 in Seoul, South Korea and on 6 June in Hong Kong, China. In September 2026 was announced a 2027 comeback tour in Latin America, this time also including Argentina, and in October 2026, a performance on June 26, 2027 at Fate Festival in Rome, Italy.

== Acting career ==
Gackt's introduction to filmmaking, in addition to music videos, came in 2001 and 2002 with two TV documentaries. First, he traveled to Madagascar for the TV show Ima Hadaka ni Shitai Otoko-tachi (いま裸にしたい男たち), then participated in the children's documentary, Hero's Hero, both aired on NHK. In 2003, he worked on the script and starred as Shō in his film, Moon Child, which was filmed in Taiwan. It was released on April 19 in Japan, and screened on May 13 at the Cannes Film Festival and on April 12, 2004, at Philadelphia Film Festival. He voiced Seiji in the original video animation, New Fist of the North Star, for which two of his older songs were used as themes and released as a single "Lu:na/Oasis". Gackt also assisted as a model and provided the voice and the motion capture for a main character Lau Wong in the video game Bujingai by Taito and Red Entertainment. His next involvement was in 2006, with the Final Fantasy franchise, for a video game Dirge of Cerberus, and again in 2007 for a video game Crisis Core, where the character Genesis Rhapsodos was modeled on, voiced and co-created by Gackt. Besides that, Gackt composed and performed two theme songs for the first game, which were released in the single "Redemption".

In 2007, Gackt played the Sengoku-period daimyō Uesugi Kenshin in the NHK Taiga drama, Fūrin Kazan, for which he was nominated for the TV Navi award as best-supporting actor in a drama category. Gackt recalls that Kenshin was always portrayed as a very tough man. Thus his vision with female myth in mind, which presented him clean-shaven and with long hair, received harsh criticism, but Ken Ogata expressed his approval and supported Gackt's work in the drama. His single "Returner (Yami no Shūen)" music video was inspired by the drama, and the song was used as the theme song in the Japanese version of movie The Prestige. In the same year Gackt was a voice actor in the Japanese dub of the French animated-live action film, Arthur and the Minimoys.

In 2008, Gackt was filming in Romania for his first international film debut, Bunraku, which was released in 2010. The next year he appeared as a prisoner Takegami Teijiro on death row in the second episode of the TV series, Mr. Brain, and Joji Yuki in the film Kamen Rider Decade: All Riders vs. Dai-Shocker. In 2008 and 2009 collaborated as an actor, with main character based on him and were used his songs in two slo-pachinko's, Yamasa Digi World SP Bounty Killer and Gladiator Evolution.

In 2010, he was a voice actor several times, first for the film Arthur and the Revenge of Maltazard, then the anime series Shiki, his first regular voice cast role; and Tono to Issho, where he provided the voice for the daimyo he previously played on television. He also voiced characters for two video games, Velskud in Dragon Nest, for which he composed and performed the theme song, "Ever", and pilot "Ex-" of Extreme Gundam the final boss in Mobile Suit Gundam: Extreme Vs.. In 2011, he was a voice actor for the sequel of the Tono to Issho anime series, Andy in Supernatural: The Animation (episode 21 first season), and Dante in Sket Dance for which he also performed its theme "Graffiti" as well. He appeared in the TV drama, Tempest (テンペスト) in which he played Jotei Gai, a Chinese eunuch who tries to take over the Ryukyu Kingdom. He was also a voice actor of Knight Commander and theme song "Until The Last Day" performer for the video game animated film, Dragon Age: Dawn of the Seeker.

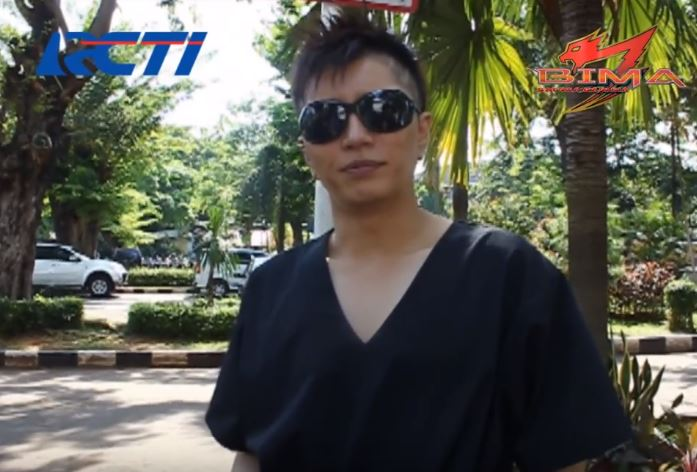
Gackt in 2013 on Indonesian RCTI greeting BIMA Satria Garuda.

In 2012, Gackt appeared in the Sengoku Basara television drama, Sengoku Basara: Moonlight Party, as the games' depiction of warlord Oda Nobunaga. He also performed the series' theme song "Hakuro" (his 42nd single). He was also seen in a dual role as a Professor of Neurology Shiki Takashi and Yumeoji (literally translated "Dream Prince") in the drama Akumu-chan, which is based on the novel Yume Chigai (夢違) by Riku Onda. In mid-2013 was the voice actor of Travis Grady and provided image song "Claymore" in Japanese dubbing of Silent Hill: Revelation. In November 2013, Gackt appeared as a guest-star in two episodes (21 & 22) of the Indonesian Tokusatsu series, Bima Satria Garuda, as "Noir", the mysterious "Bima Legend" Knight from Parallel World. In 2014, he repeated his role in the movie Akumu-chan, and starred in the drama Time Spiral as a time-traveler university professor Shuya Tatsumi, based on the web novel Tokeru Rasen (解 け る 螺旋) by Eren Mizumori (水守恵蓮). Gackt collaborated with Square Enix on the role-playing game 3594e -Sangokushi Eiga- for iOS, based on the story of Romance of the Three Kingdoms, a Chinese historical novel. The in-game playable character, military general Lü Bu, was voiced by him and he also provided a theme song.

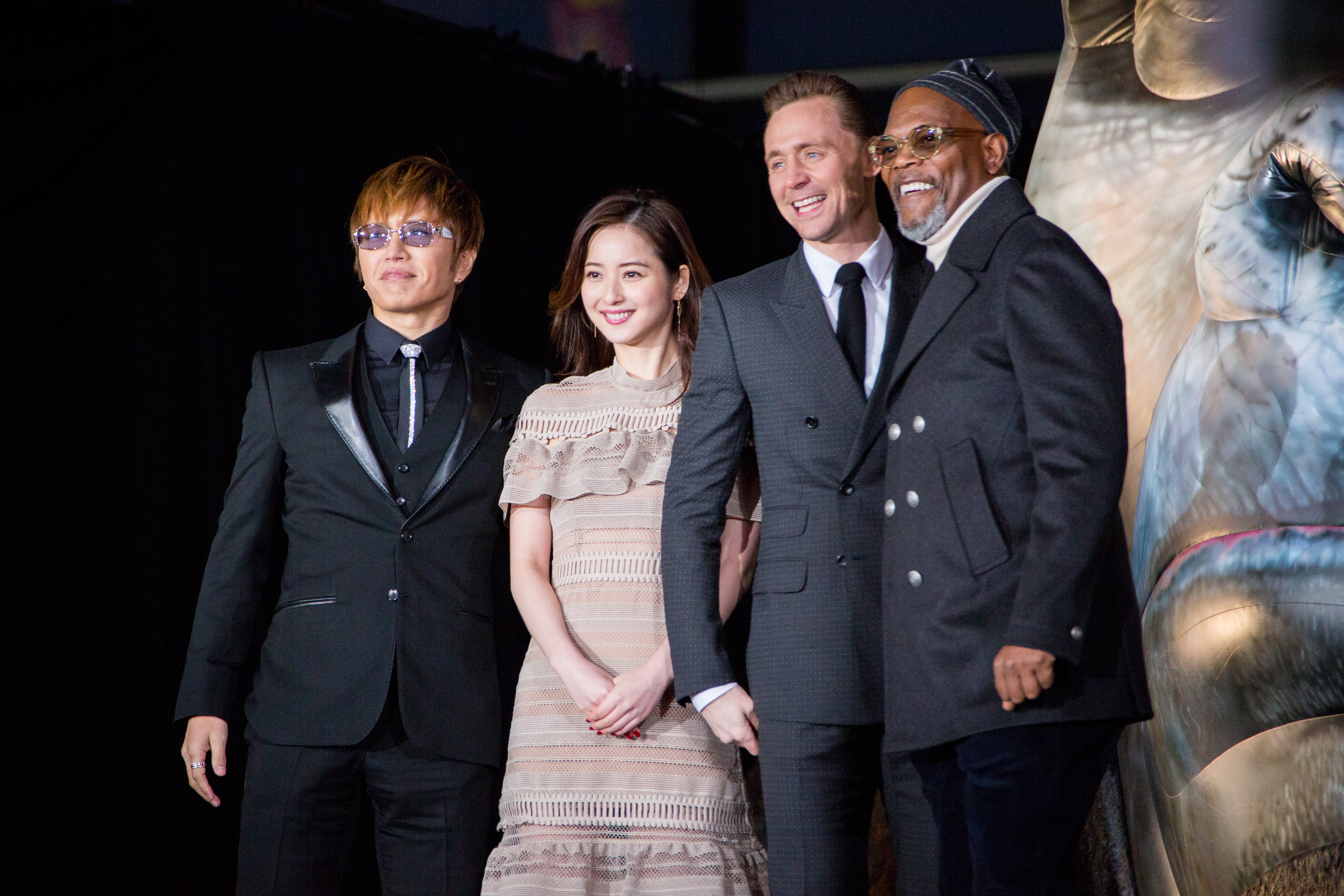
Gackt with Sasaki Nozomi, Tom Hiddleston and Samuel L. Jackson at the Japanese premiere of Kong: Skull Island in 2017.

In 2015, Gackt made a cameo appearance in Origami, a short film by director Cato Ochi. It premiered at the Cannes Film Festival. In the same year he voiced the characters Uesugi Kenshin and Sengoku Gackt which was modelled after him as well as provided the opening theme song of the mobile game Sengoku Shura Soul. In early 2016, it was announced that Gackt was to have his first lead role after 14 years in the movie Karanukan (2018) directed by Yasuhiro Hamano (浜野安宏). The movie is set at the Yaeyama Islands of Okinawa, and Gackt portrays photographer Hikaru Ooyama who falls in love with a girl, Mami who mysteriously disappears. In the same year he voiced Maten Ruedo in the mobile game Othellonia, was a voice actor for The Fiend with Twenty Faces providing also opening and ending theme songs for the anime Trickster, and also dubbed the main role played by Tom Hiddleston in the Japanese dub of Kong: Skull Island.

In August 2018, it was announced that Gackt will have a co-leading role as 18-year-old student Rei Asami in a live adaptation movie of the 1980s comedy manga Tonde Saitama (翔んで埼玉), written by Mineo Maya (魔夜峰央). The film was released in early 2019 to critical acclaim, and Gackt was nominated at the 43rd Japan Academy Film Prize for Outstanding Performance by an Actor in a Leading Role. In October 2022 was confirmed to have started working on Tonde Saitama sequel, which was released in November 2023. In 2026, Gackt starred in TV dramas, Consultant – The Man Who Writes About Death, and Fuji TV's Black Trick: The Lawyer Who Controls Justice (with a Netflix release), and performed their theme songs "Fall Again" and "Stand Alone".

=== Theatre ===
In May 2010, a play named Nemuri Kyoshiro Buraihikae was staged at Nissay Theatre in Tokyo, in which Gackt starred as the main protagonist. The show ran for 120 performances in seven cities until February 27, 2011, with an estimated 150,000 spectators. In 2012, Gackt announced a plan to continue the concept of Moon Saga with a stage theatre play written, composed and directed by him, 'Moon Saga - Mysteries of Yoshitsune, in which he starred as Minamoto no Yoshitsune, starting from July 15 at Akasaka ACT Theatre in Tokyo. The final two of 60 shows were held on September 26 and October 2, in Tokyo. The estimated audience was about 50,000 spectators. The second "Moon" stage theatre adaptation ran from August until October 2014, with 40 performances in seven cities, notable for the first major use of projection mapping in theatre stage plays.

== Music artistry ==
=== Voice ===
"Jūnigatsu no Love Song"
A sample of "Jūnigatsu no Love Song" (2001), a Christmas love song inspired by September 11 attacks in New York City. It was later recorded in English, Chinese and Korean language.

"Returner ~Yami no Shūen~"
A sample of rock song "Returner (Yami no Shūen)" (2007), Gackt's first and only number one spot on the Oricon Singles Chart, and prominently featuring Japanese traditional instruments.

Gackt has a low-pitched voice with a vibrato pitch at D_{3}-D_{4}, and is capable of using falsetto, like for example in the songs "Ares" and "4th", among others. In his songs, he shows a wide range and often sings both low and high notes in the same song, sometimes also adding the falsetto. According to Gackt, he overextended his voice between 2003 and 2004 so searched for the right range until 2005, since which he has used a more restrained vocal style. His voice has been described as "very melodramatic", as well as "smooth, sleek, unnaturally heartfelt", "velvet" and "molasses".

=== Songwriting ===
His songs range from melodic ballads to intense hard rock songs, in which he masterfully combines "raw rock elements" with "listener-friendly compositions" and string instruments. Josephine Yun in A Concise Report on 40 of the Biggest Rock Acts in Japan (2005) noted his "talent for orchestration and for blending classical elements into the rock genre ... and his style ranges from romantically classical to experimental and unfolding progressive rock". Some songs, like for example "Mind Forest", "Metamorphoze", "Returner (Yami no Shūen)", and those related to the album Last Moon, are distinctive for their blend of modern Western musical instruments and traditional Japanese musical instruments, a kind of music called by Gackt as "Zipangu rock" from which can be sensed it originates from Japan.

Gackt often "stressed the beauty and importance of Japanese lyrics", writing "all of his music and lyrics to quality, not quantity". He uses double meaning words, and lyrics are "meaningful and heartfelt". They also deal with emotions of sadness, kindness, coexistence, beauty, fragility, depth of love for others and loneliness among many others.

His process of writing songs and making concerts is by first writing the story, then writing and composing the songs based on it with a specific image in the live performance. It results in songs that are conceptually related, but still independent from each other. Most of his studio albums are conceived around two conceptual stories: story of "Moon Saga" (Moon, Crescent, Diabolos, Last Moon), set in Asia (mostly Japan) and Europe is a vampire story although by itself it is not, as the vampires were presented as a way of expressing a certain evil side and existence of humans. The theme is based around the existential questions of humanity, a symbolical and psychological story about the repetition of human sins, war and the question of what is the ultimate meaning of human life; and story of "Requiem et Reminiscence" or short "ЯR" (Rebirth, Re:Born), which is set in Nazi Germany during the World War II and questions where humans start and end and why at the same time destructive and loving, humanity decides to start wars.

=== Performances ===
==== Visualive ====
Gackt is known for his unique concerts, which he wants to preserve as works of art. His conceptual kind of concerts related to "Moon Saga" and "Requiem et Reminiscence" are different from typical music concerts neither they fit in the usual categories of a musical or a theatre play. Thus Gackt calls them "Visualive", because they are formed by a story, music, movies, theatre and musical elements, as well as live performance (with Gackt "acting" as the story protagonist). The shows are elaborately divided into two basic parts, conceptual and entertainment, which can be further divided into four parts, first has introduction concept movie followed by first set of concept songs, second has stage clothes change and second set of concept songs, third after a video of relief has a separate set of songs and MC with audience engaging in playful entertainment, and fourth has ending conceptual performance and closing movie.

Reviewers described them as rock spectacles with a teartful story that will make the audience wish for a peaceful world. During the performance of "Rain" on 2002 and 2003 tours had the water drops falling like a rain from the ceiling onto the stage. His final performance of Diabolos tour in 2005 at Tokyo Dome (costing roughly $4.3 million) received praise and shocked the audience, as included entering the arena on a horseback in full gallop with four other horse riders, in a suspended coffin during "Lust for Blood", singing "Love Letter" hanging 20m in the air, and disappearing in a sudden smoke explosion. The 2008-09 Requiem et Reminiscence II and 2016 Last Visualive - Last Moon tour concerts lasted up to four hours.

The Visualive concert format was originally created during the Requiem et Reminiscence tour in 2001, and according to Gackt, it took him almost ten years to arrive to a satisfying point of form during the Requiem et Reminiscence II tour in 2008-2009. However, he found such way of expression as difficult and physically and mentally exhausting, with a profitability that is not in accordance with the demands of entertainment industry. By 2007 he had a lot of requests to tour worldwide, but such large-scale shows are difficult to have in foreign countries and need significant logistical support for transportation.

==== Other ====
Gackt's example of a more typical concert is D.r.u.g. Party tour (2006-2007) featuring his rock songs, with Oricon review noting his eroticism and charisma while performing, and Gackt considering it his and worldwide's pinnacle of an all-out androgynous style by a man.

Another typical, yet physically intense concept, is that of his rock band Yellow Fried Chickenz (2010-2012, 2024–present).

The Camui Gakuen festival shows (2009-2019) have Gackt performing cover versions conceptualized around a same-titled fictional school where Gackt acts as the student council president wearing a school uniform. He can be seen cross-dressing as a female, being a drummer of SEX Japan (pun on Yoshiki and his band X Japan), or a guitarist of The Balue Hearts (pun on The Blue Hearts) among others.

In 2025, Gackt began a new live concept Maō shinfonī (魔王シンフォニー, Demonic Symphony / Demon King Symphony), fusing a rock band and more than 70-piece standing orchestra as one sonical ensemble, all wearing black robes and masks alike a "black mass", and in instrumental part Gackt is conducting the orchestra. It is also introducing to the classical music concerts an all-standing first floor, smoking effects, and more for a production of a "truly dark fantasy".

== Cultural status ==
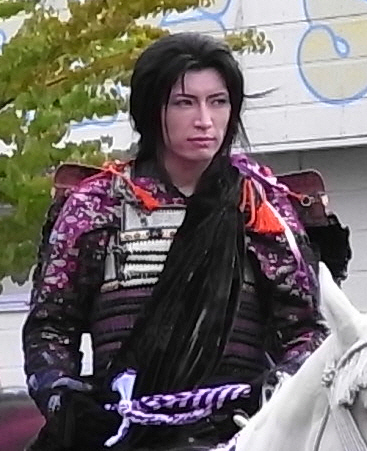
Gackt as Uesugi Kenshin at Jōetsu city's 83rd Kenshin Festival in 2008.

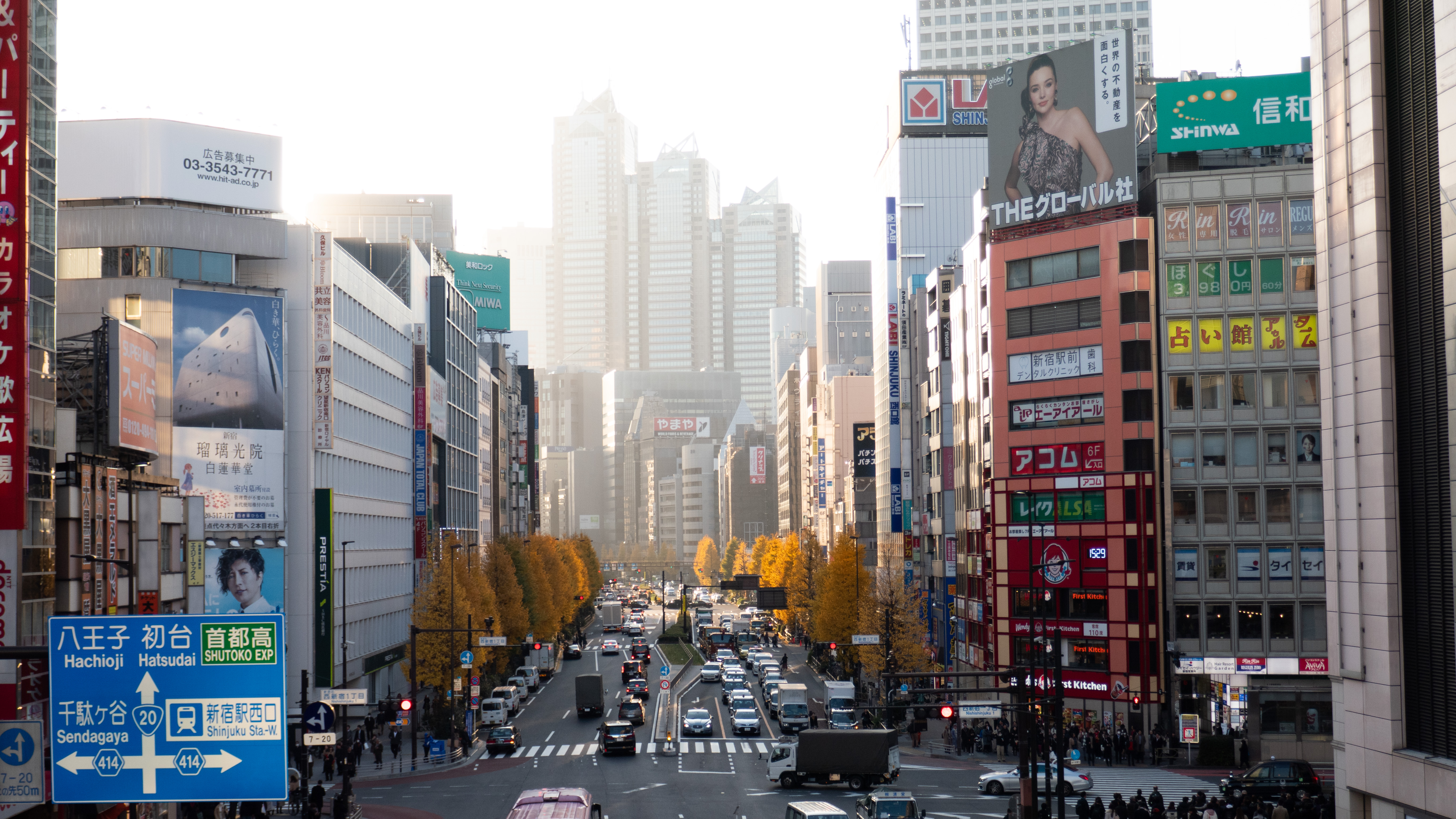
Gackt featured on a commercial sign (left downward) in Shinjuku, Tokyo, 2019.

Gackt is considered a Japanese pop and fashion icon, J-pop/J-rock superstar and Japanese idol, and due to his involvement with the visual kei movement, which emphasizes androgynous and changing appearance, he is referred to as a "living manifestation of readers' fantasy men" found in bishōnen manga. Otaku USA magazine in 2007 stated "His 'more than human' appearance and persona were a hit with the mass media in Japan. It was as if a fictitious character suddenly popped out in the real world". He has been compared to fictional characters like Griffith from Berserk, Cloud Strife and Squall Leonhart from Final Fantasy, as well as having been an inspiration for manga characters. In his late career his appearance changed to more "macho".

Gackt became associated with Japanese daimyo Uesugi Kenshin who he played in NHK Taiga drama Fūrin Kazan. Gackt was subsequently invited to act as Kenshin at Jōetsu city's traditional 82nd Kenshin Festival in August 2007. In August 2010 he participated in the 85th Kenshin Festival for the third time, with a record attendance of more than 240,000 visitors. Four more times he reprised the role in the festival, with a new record high number of 243,000 visitors in August 2015.

Gackt's sex appeal has been noted by national polls, such as by Oricon, similar to those done by People. He often ranked highly in beauty listings, as the most or one of the most beautiful/sexiest Japanese men, celebrities or artists. In 2009, he was also ranked fifth among rock music personalities in Japanese history. Gackt on several occasions served as a fashion model (including for Yoshiyuki Konishi), producer and designer. In the first half of his career he had own jewelry & sunglasses brand Darts. In 2002 received Japan Glasses Best Dressed Award, and in 2003 Best Dressed Award by Japan Men's Fashion Association. In 2007 at the China Fashion Week in Shanghai received award for the Japanese Fashion Artist of the Year.

Over the years, Gackt appeared as a performer, guest and regular member on several television variety shows, including Hey! Hey! Hey! Music Champ, and since 2009, TV Asahi's New Year's special Geinoujin-Kakuzuke-Check (Celebrity Rating Check), as of January 2026 he holds the record streak of 87 straight individual wins, building an image of a top connoisseur and "first-class entertainer". Gackt was one of the judges of Japan's first season of Got Talent show which premiered on February 11, 2023.

Gackt appeared in many television commercials, including for Fujifilm, Shiseido, Daihatsu, Niconico, Tsutaya, Square Enix, and Konami, among others. From July 2014 to August 2016 in collaboration with Nestlé Japan was started a gaming channel "Game Center" with daily video release of Gackt playing video games, gathering more than 15 million views in first season alone. In 2019 became ambassador for PUBG Mobile in Japan, a collaboration that until 2023 saw him contributing original models of himself, skin outfits which wore in his career, weapon skins and voice pack.

On July 31, 2008, Internet Co., Ltd. released Gackpoid, a Vocaloid using a recorded selection of Gackt's voice.

== Entrepreneurship ==
Gackt's other entrepreneurship projects include, among others, producing a line of sake "Chateau Gackt" in 2013. In 2016, he co-founded a real estate company with Satoshi Ikeda, named Gackt & Ikeda Asia Bridge Partnerz, in Kuala Lumpur. In 2017, he got involved as a core member and strategic advisor for Asia of a virtual currency project, Spindle. In 2019 was chosen as the executive organizer of the Japan Grown Diamond Association. In 2023 went on a long-term collaboration with a newly constructed winery and vineyard at Kaminokuni, Hokkaido.

== Philanthropy ==
The year 2007 saw the creation of the Save our Dears charity to help the victims of the Chūetsu offshore earthquake that struck the Niigata Prefecture. To raise funds for this charity, Gackt designed a keychain and bracelets, in addition, the charity also featured two Orico UPty MasterCard credit cards. Gackt's fan club Dears, (Note: Dears is the former name of G&Lovers, Gackt's official fan club. As of October 1st, 2013, it was renamed to G&Lovers. On March 15, 2016, an international fan club was also opened. Specially reserved events were organized for the members, like an annual trip, which so far visited Hawaii, Seoul, Sydney, Vancouver, Los Angeles, Paris, Singapore, Toronto, Macau, Thailand, and Rome.) raised ¥2,000,000 (US$26,041) which Gackt donated to the city of Jōetsu at the 83rd Kenshin Festival in 2008.

On December 14, 2010 he participated in and performed in a Hohoemi project charity event called "Message! to Asia", by DATV at Tokyo Dome, whose profits were planned to help street children in Cambodia and the Philippines. For an auction at the event, he auctioned his custom 1999 Pontiac Firebird Trans Am MS6, which was sold for ¥6,015,000 (US$72,033).

In 2011, because of the Tōhoku earthquake and tsunami, Gackt founded the "Show Your Heart" charity for collecting money to buy supplies for the victims. In March, a truck convoy with 72,000 lb (33,000 kg) of food and clothes was delivered and a nationwide street-corner fund-raising campaign was held, with Gackt's participation, which collected ¥25,234,490 (or US$320,193). All money collected through bank transfers and street fundraising activities was transferred from Rakuten to the Japanese Red Cross, totalling ¥208,181,735 (US$2,641,564). Part of the 2011 world tour and other activities of Gackt's band project Yellow Fried Chickenz revenue was also donated to the Japanese Red Cross. At several theatre plays of his Moon Saga: Mysteries of Yoshitsune I (2012), with the help of the Ashinaga (organization), orphans from the earthquake were invited and also received a monetary donation for scholarship.

In addition to making a private donation, Gackt sold merchandise during the 2020 tour which raised ¥4.7 million (roughly US$44,000) to support the reconstruction of the recently burned-down Shuri Castle in Shuri, Okinawa.

== Personal life ==
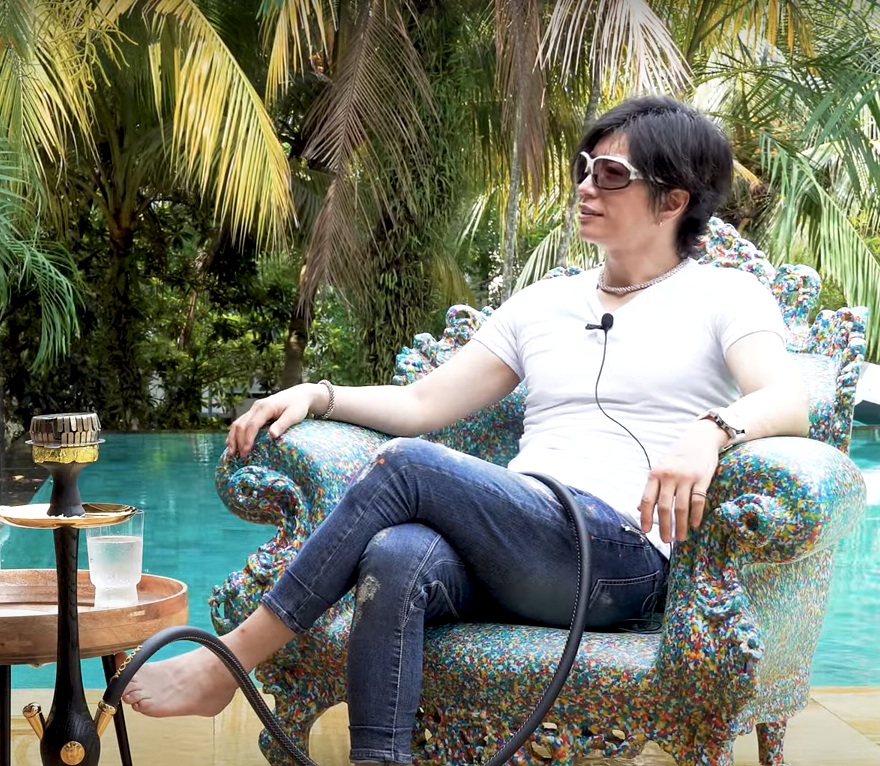
Gackt interviewed in Malaysia, 2023.

Gackt is an ethnic Uchinanchu i.e. Ryukyuan. When he was young he experienced discrimination for it in Japan but it did not have a negative effect on him. He reportedly also experienced discrimination in a Paris hotel in 2015 for being Asian. His stated life and music goal is giving people hope, connecting them and uniting Asian countries.

When he was 20 years old, Gackt was briefly married to a South Korean woman, and his "last big love affair" which ended in 2014 was reportedly with Japanese-born South Korean singer Lee Ahyumi.

Gackt has lived for most of his life in Tokyo, Japan. In 2012 he moved to the Philippines and Hong Kong, with his primary residence located in Malaysia, where he has a mansion of 1,700 square meters situated in a residential area on the outskirts of Kuala Lumpur. In 2022 he was announced to be building and designing a new mansion in Malaysia.

He also speaks Mandarin, Korean, English, and some French. He has a second-degree black belt rank in ITF taekwondo, as well as experience in other martial arts like karate, boxing, jiu-jitsu among others. In the past years he enjoys playing poker and since 2017 plays competitively on live tournaments, with largest cash of $75,600 from fourth-place finish in Aria High Roller, Las Vegas.

He stated that his philosophical way of life is similar to Japanese Bushido. His personal religious belief is close to a nature god. His family believed that their deceased members became gods and they should venerate them, hence exist two conceptions of Ryukyuan religion in Okinawa whether to venerate the ancestors or nature. It does not have a well-defined theorization and rituals, but the practice is an acknowledgment of everything that surrounds people, "a love of nature". Gackt every year with his 20-30 staff members is cleaning his family Monchū tomb deep in the mountains of Southern Okinawa from where his ancestors originate, while the family altar in Northern Okinawa because his great-grandfather founded a town there.

== Discography ==
=== Solo ===
- Mizérable (EP/Mini-LP) (1999)
- Mars (2000)
- Rebirth (2001)
- Moon (2002)
- Crescent (2003)
- Love Letter (2005)
- Diabolos (2005)
- Re:Born (2009)
- Last Moon (2016)

=== Malice Mizer ===
- Voyage Sans Retour (1996)
- Merveilles (1998)

== Filmography ==
=== Movies ===
- Moon Child (2003), Shō
- Kamen Rider Decade: All Riders vs. Dai-Shocker (2009), Joji Yuki
- Bunraku (2010), Yoshi
- The Tempest 3D (2012), Jo Teigai
- Akumu-chan (2014), Takashi Shiki/Yume Ōji
- Origami (2015, short film)
- Karanukan (2018), Hikaru Ooyama
- Fly Me to the Saitama (2019), Rei Asami
- The Confidence Man JP: Episode of the Princess (2020), Mysterious man
- Fly Me to the Saitama: From Biwa Lake with Love (2023), Rei Asami
- What If Shogun Ieyasu Tokugawa Was to Become the Prime Minister (2024), Oda Nobunaga
- Blazing Fists (2025), Shizuka Midō

=== Television series and documentaries ===
- Ima Hadaka Ni Shitai Otoko-tachi (いま裸にしたい男たち) (2001)
- Hero's Hero (2002)
- Fūrin Kazan (2007), Uesugi Kenshin
- Mr. Brain (2009), Takegami Teijiro (Ep. 2)
- The Tempest (2011), Jyoteigai
- Akumu-chan (2012), Takashi Shiki/Yumeoji
- Sengoku Basara: Moonlight Party (2012), Oda Nobunaga
- Bima Satria Garuda (2013), Noir
- Renai ha Hitsuzen de Aru (2014), Storyteller
- Time Spiral (2014), Shuya Tatsumi
- Shin Abarenbō Shōgun (2025), Tokugawa Muneharu
- Consultant – The Man Who Writes About Death (2026), Akifumi Kurokawa
- Black Trick: The Lawyer Who Controls Justice (2026), Naoto Uramawashi

=== Voice acting ===
- New Fist of the North Star (2003, OVA), Seiji
- Bujingai (2003, video game), Lau Wong
- Dirge of Cerberus: Final Fantasy VII (2006, video game), Genesis Rhapsodos
- Crisis Core: Final Fantasy VII (2007, video game), Genesis Rhapsodos
- Arthur and the Minimoys (2007, animated film, Japanese dubbing version), Maltazard
- Arthur and the Revenge of Maltazard (2010, animated film, Japanese dubbing), Maltazard
- Shiki (2010, anime), Seishiro Kirishiki
- Tono to Issho (2010, anime), Kenshin Uesugi
- Dragon Nest (2010-2016, video game, Japanese dubbing), Velskud
- Mobile Suit Gundam: Extreme Vs. (2010, video game), Ex-/Extreme Gundam
- Supernatural: The Anime Series (2011, anime), Andy
- Sket Dance (2011, anime), Kiyoshi "Dante" Date
- Dragon Age: Dawn of the Seeker (2012, animated film), Knight Commander
- Silent Hill: Revelation 3D (2012, feature film, Japanese dubbing), Travis Grady
- 3594e (2014, mobile game), Lü Bu
- Sengoku Shura Soul (2015, mobile game), Uesugi Kenshin and Sengoku Gackt
- Othellonia (2016, mobile game), Maten Ruedo
- Trickster (2016, anime), The Fiend with Twenty Faces
- Kong: Skull Island (2017, feature film, Japanese dubbing), James Conrad
- Crisis Core: Final Fantasy VII Reunion (2022, video game), Genesis Rhapsodos

== Bibliography ==
- 自白 (Jihaku: Confession) (in Japanese). Kobunsha. 2003. ISBN 4-334-97412-0. (autobiography; sold over 100,000 copies)
- Moon Child 鎮魂歌 (Moon Child Requiem) (in Japanese). Kadokawa Shoten. 2003. ISBN 978-4048734615. (novel)
- Gacktionary (in Japanese). Kadokawa. 2009. ISBN 978-4048950701. (quotes collection)
- Moon Saga 義経秘伝 (Moon Saga Mysteries of Yoshitsune) (in Japanese). Kodansha. 2014. ISBN 978-4062190565. (novel)
- Gacktの格゛言集 (Gackt no Gakugenshu) (in Japanese). Takarajimasha. 2015. ISBN 9784800234674. (quotes collection)
- Oh!! My!! Gackt!! (in Japanese). Kadokawa. 2017. ISBN 9784046017062. (blog post collection)
- Gacktの勝ち方 (in Japanese). North Village, 株式会社サンクチュアリ・パブリッシング. 2019. ISBN 9784861133770. (self-help book)
- Gackt超思考術 (in Japanese). North Village, 株式会社サンクチュアリ・パブリッシング. 2021. ISBN 9784861133794. (self-help book)
- Gacktのドス黒いメンタリズム (in Japanese). North Village, 株式会社サンクチュアリ・パブリッシング. 2022. ISBN 978-4861133800. (self-help book)
- Gackt敗戦記 (in Japanese). North Village, 株式会社サンクチュアリ・パブリッシング. 2023. ISBN 9784861133909. (semi-autobiography)
- 自白 II (Jihaku: Confession II) (in Japanese). Kobunsha. 2023. ISBN 978-4334101459. (autobiography)

== Tours ==
Arena tours:

- 2000: Mars Sora Kara no Homonsha (Mars 空からの訪問者)
- 2001: Requiem et Reminiscence
- 2002: Kagen no Tsuki (下弦の⽉)
- 2003: Jogen no Tsuki (上弦の⽉)
- 2004: The Sixth Day & Seventh Night
- 2005-06: Diabolos ~Aien no Shi~ (Diabolos 〜哀婉の詩〜)
- 2008-09: Requiem et Reminiscence II ~Saisei to Kaikou~ (Requiem et Reminiscence II 〜再生と邂逅〜)
- 2009-19: Kamui Gakuen
- 2013: Best of the Best Vol. I
- 2016: Last Visualive Saigo no Tsuki –Last Moon– (Last Visualive 最期ノ月 –Last Moon–)

Club tours:

- 1999: 99 Gackt Resurrection & Easter Live
- 2006-07: Training Days – Dears Reserved Unique Gackt (D.r.u.g./Drug) Party

Theater, hall tours:

- 2020: Khaos
- 2021-26: Last Songs feat. K
- 2026: Demonic Symphony –Infinity–

Club, theater tours:

- 2026-27: Gackt Yellow Fried Chickenz ～World Tour Attack of YFCz～
