= Lost Angels (song) =

Single by Gackt

from the album Re:Born
- Released: June 24, 2009
- Recorded: 2008
- Genre: Symphonic rock, Hard rock
- Label: Dears
- Songwriter(s): Gackt C.
- Producer(s): Gackt

Gackt singles chronology
"Faraway (Hoshi ni Negai o)" (2009)	"Lost Angels" (2009)	"Flower" (2009)

Alternative cover
- Dears only

"Lost Angels" is the thirty-third single by Japanese recording artist Gackt, released on June 24, 2009. This single is the third of four singles of the countdown to Gackt's 10th anniversary as solo artist. This single has been titled "The 3rd Heaven". Each of the countdown singles were released within a week of each other. The title track was used as ending theme song of the Nippon TV's program Information Live Miyaneya (情報ライブ ミヤネ屋, Jōhō raibu Miyaneya) between June 29 and October 2, 2009.

== CD ==
No.	Title	Length
1.	"Lost Angels"
2.	"No Reason"
3.	"Suddenly"
4.	"Lost Angels (instrumental)"
5.	"No Reason (instrumental)"
6.	"Suddenly (instrumental)"

== Charts ==
Chart (2009)	Peak position
Oricon Weekly Singles	5
Billboard Japan Hot 100	50
Billboard Japan Top Independent	1
