= Bujingai =

2003 video game

Bujingai: Swordmaster
- European version cover art
- Developers: Taito; Red Entertainment
- Publishers: JP: Taito; NA: BAM! Entertainment; EU: 505 Gamestreet
- Director: Hiroshi Aoki
- Producers: Takeshi Kamimura; Keisaku Okumura
- Designer: Hiroshi Aoki
- Programmer: Harumi Kasuga
- Artist: Toshihiro Kawamoto
- Writer: Yōsuke Kuroda
- Composers: Tamayo Kawamoto; Katsuhisa Ishikawa; Hideki Takahagi
- Platform: PlayStation 2
- Release: JP: December 25, 2003; NA: July 22, 2004; EU: February 18, 2005
- Genres: Beat 'em up, hack and slash
- Mode: Single-player

Bujingai (武刃街), known in North America as Bujingai: The Forsaken City and in Europe as Bujingai: Swordmaster, is an action video game developed by Taito in collaboration with Red Entertainment, for the PlayStation 2 console. The game was published by Taito in Japan on December 25, 2003. It was released in North America by BAM! Entertainment and in Europe by 505 Games on July 22, 2004 and February 18, 2005 respectively.

Bujingai is set in the 23rd century, about 100 years after a global catastrophe wiped out a majority of the Earth's population and its entire government. The survivors have found themselves in possession of magical powers stemming from the energies of the Earth. The game's story follows one such man, Lau Wong, a sword-wielding exile who returns to Earth to confront a former ally and an army of demons who have taken hold of the titular Asian city of Bujingai. The graphics and gameplay in Bujingai are visually inspired by martial arts (Wuxia) films of Hong Kong. The game is a third-person beat 'em up/hack and slash in which the player controls the protagonist Lau, exploring open environments, solving minor puzzles, and battling enemies and bosses. The game features a counterattack mechanic and the ability to chain together sword slashes in excess of 1,000 hits.

Bujingai acted as a 50th anniversary release for Taito. Taking two years to create, the development team included Taito veteran Hiroshi Aoki as director, Taito's in-house band Zuntata as music composers, and external talent in the form of Cowboy Bebop character designer Toshihiro Kawamoto and Trigun scenario writer Yōsuke Kuroda in their respective roles. The likeness of Japanese pop icon Gackt was used in making the protagonist Lau Wong; Gackt himself aided in the game's promotion prior to its launch. Bujingai received above-average reviews from press sources, who praised its combat gameplay, visual style, and character designs. However, many of these same reviewers criticized the game as having poor jumping mechanics, dull level designs, and a weak plot.

== Plot ==
Set in the 23rd century, Bujingai begins 100 years after an accident involving an environmentally-friendly energy source annihilated 70 percent of the world's population and all of its government. Those who survived found themselves with special abilities harnessed through the energies of the Earth itself, which they honed into a discipline of magic and swordplay. A mysterious and powerful human exile, Lau Wong, returns to the planet to battle his former friend and training partner Rei Jenron, who has been possessed by an evil spirit. Rei has kidnapped the soul of his once-beloved Yohfa and opened numerous portals, allowing demons to overtake the Asian city of Bujingai. Lau stands as the only one capable of stopping Rei and the demons threatening the world's remaining population.

== Gameplay ==
The player character battles an enemy. Health and defense meters for the player and enemy are displayed top left and top right respectively. The player's magic meter is on the bottom left and collected blue orbs on the bottom right.

Bujingai is a third-person beat 'em up/hack and slash game where the player controls the protagonist Lau, exploring different environments, completing minor objectives, and battling numerous enemies and more powerful end-stage bosses. The player can attack with dual-wielded swords, jump, spin, execute magical abilities, or perform any combination of the aforementioned abilities. The game contains a large number of combination attacks, some of which can be chained together in excess of 1,000 hits on a single adversary. While in combat, the player will automatically block an enemy's strike if facing their direction. However, a defense meter for both Lau and his enemy will deplete after each blow is exchanged; only when the defense meter is emptied can any real damage be incurred. Bujingai allows the player to counter an assailant as well. By timing it with an attack of their own, the camera will cut away to a fixed, posed shot of Lau, then allowing the player to deal heavy damage to the foe. Some tougher enemies like mid-stage bosses are, in turn, adept at countering Lau in a similar fashion. Bujingai offers the player a number of magic spells ranging from a basic fireball to a powerful whirlwind foray. These spells are dependent on a magic meter which can be refilled by picking up power-ups or successfully dicing up enemies.

The gameplay in Bujingai is visually styled akin to Hong Kong martial arts (Wuxia) films with colorful sword-slashes, spinning aerial jousts, and gliding. Alongside basic jumping, the player can tap the appropriate button again to glide through the air or run along a wall. These abilities are key to solving puzzles and navigating certain levels. By defeating enemies and busting up destructable objects, the player can collect blue orbs, which can be exchanged at the end of each stage to upgrade Lau's health, defense, magic meter or magic attacks. Bonuses can also be earned depending on how well the player performs in each level, dependent on factors such as completion time, the amount of damage taken, the number of continues used, and "stylized action points". Collecting hidden coins within stages allow for additional bonuses.

== Development ==
Bujingai was developed as a joint venture between Taito and Red Entertainment, with the game representing a 50th anniversary release for Taito. Bujingai was directed and chiefly designed by Hiroshi Aoki. The game's characters were designed by Toshihiro Kawamoto, whose previous credits include the anime television series Cowboy Bebop and Wolf's Rain. Yōsuke Kuroda, the game's scenario writer, worked on series including Please Teacher!, s-CRY-ed, and Trigun. The game's music was composed by members of Zuntata, Taito's in-house band: Katsuhisa Ishikawa acted as sound director and composed the game's sound effects while Hideki Takahagi composed the background music. The likeness of Japanese pop icon Gackt was used to create Bujingai protagonist Lau Wong with CG models and motion capture. Though Gackt does not speak any actual lines (with the exception of some lines for gameplay) as Lau, fellow voice actors Kōichi Yamadera, Maaya Sakamoto, and Norio Wakamoto provide a generous amount of dialogue as supporting characters in the game.

Bujingai took about two years total to develop, with the first six months devoted to pre-production. Producer Keisaku Okumura explained that it was a challenge to make a universally accepted collaboration between Taito, an old corporation with a large imprint on the history of the Japanese arcade industry, and Red Entertainment, a younger "hooligan" company. The developers discussed with Taito at the project's outset about surpassing traditional Hong Kong cinema, specifically its martial arts films. Aoki's goal was to make the game unique among other action titles like Shinobi and Nightshade by implementing intuitive controls, responsive enemies, and faithfully reproduced swordplay. Kuroda expanded on the setting ideas of the game as first presented by Aoki. Kuroda had never worked on an action genre game before, but found it the writing relatively easy, creating "a unique game that would appeal to consumers while still including some of [his] own interests". Kuroda noted the finished product as "a game with an 'Asian flavor' as seen through Japanese eyes". The team had no particular theme when designing Lau and his antagonists at the start, but gradually focused on character silhouettes; imagery using mythological creatures like the dragon and phoenix; and "beauty of the flow of action during the sword fighting scenes".

== Release ==
Bujingai was first announced in an August 2003 issue of Enterbrain's Weekly Famitsu magazine after the game was about 50 percent complete. Bujingai was first presented on August 28 at a 50th anniversary commemoration event for Taito. In the months leading up to its release, the game was demonstrated by the development staff at Japanese tradeshows, notably the Tokyo Game Show and Games Japan Festa in Osaka. Gackt's popularity was instrumental in promoting the game prior to its release, with the star personally demonstrating the gameplay during press events. The game even contains unlockable features including a costume that will change Lau's clothing to those worn by Gackt, as well as exclusive interviews with the star and the game's voice cast. Bujingai officially went to retail in Japan on December 25, 2003. Various pieces of related merchandise were sold alongside the game. They include an official guidebook published by Enterbrain, an art book published by Shinkigensha, and a soundtrack CD released by Zuntata Records. A manga series based on the game was written by screenwriter Kuroda, illustrated by Kenichi Rou, and serialized in Kodansha's Magazine Z starting May 26, 2004.

BAM! Entertainment picked up the publishing rights for the game in January 2004. Taito's overseas division selected the publisher based on its knowledge of the North American market. The publisher added the subtitle The Forsaken City and planned to release the game in May of that year. However, this localized version saw a slight delay, making an appearance at the publisher's booth at the Electronic Entertainment Expo in early June. BAM! announced on June 10, 2004 that the game had been submitted for Sony approval. The game was finally made available at North American retailers on July 22, 2004. Sources including Computer and Video Games and GamesIndustry.biz issued news statements that Bujingai would be published by Atari in the United Kingdom in February 2005. The game was instead published throughout Europe by 505 Gamestreet under the title Bujingai: Swordmaster.

== Reception ==
Reception

Aggregate scores
Aggregator	Score
GameRankings	73%
Metacritic	72 out of 100

Review scores
Publication	Score
Computer and Video Games	8.3 out of 10
Electronic Gaming Monthly	6 out of 10
Famitsu	31 out of 40
Game Informer	7.25 out of 10
GamePro	3.5 out of 5
GameSpot	7.4 out of 10
GamesTM	8 out of 10
IGN	7.4 out of 10
Official U.S. PlayStation Magazine	8 out of 10
PlayStation: The Official Magazine	7 out of 10

Critical reception for Bujingai has been generally above-average among both print and online sources. The game has accrued aggregate scores of 73% on GameRankings and 72 out of 100 on Metacritic. Critics have found the combat gameplay enjoyable and rewarding, positively comparing it to other titles in its genre including the Devil May Cry series, Shinobi, Nightshade, Otogi: Myth of Demons, and Ninja Gaiden. GamesTM summarized, "Spend time mastering the fighting system, powering up your various attacks and revisiting stages to improve your combo scores and the game becomes so much more than just a basic hack-and-slash romp - it's a feast of replayable swordplay." GamePro stated the gameplay is "both surprisingly deep and unfortunately simple", lamenting that blocking, parrying, and counterattacking belies the ability to button mash one's way through most battles. IGN's Jeremy Dunham also noted Bujingai to have a simplistic gameplay model beneath its stylized visual presentation, but still celebrated it as "challenging, fast, and easy to learn". Reviewers have criticized the game's camera system and its jumping and gliding gameplay, referring to these mechanics as "simplistic", unresponsive, "impossible", "awkward", and "purely frustrating".

Assessments on the visuals of Bujingai have been fairly consistent. Dunham stated the game's visuals as "top of the line" by virtue of its textures, character designs, pyrotechnic effects, and a "silky smooth" frame rate. Navarro equivalently touted the visuals as its "strongest asset". GameSpot contributor Alex Navarro argued that despite not being the most graphically-advanced game available for the PS2 during its release, the game will impress players with Kawamoto's character designs and the protagonist Lau's cinematic flair. Joe Juba of Game Informer similarly enjoyed the game's character designs and action sequences, discovering within it a "unique sense of style, reminiscent of Hong Kong cinema, [permeating] every aspect". The three writers' views somewhat differed for game's level designs. Dunham labeled the environments distinctly unique, boasting "everything from blizzard-ridden mountaintops and dusty desert castles to abandoned city streets and misty bamboo forests". Navarro found these environments appealing, but disliked their consistent lack of detail and a linearity that renders the directional radar useless. Juba simply called both the enemies and environments boring. Staff reviewers for Electronic Gaming Monthly, Official U.S. PlayStation Magazine, and PSM agreed on the environments being bland.

The sound design in Bujingai received mixed criticism. Dunham appreciated the game's soundtrack, describing it as an "Asian fusion of traditional Chinese music with heavy metal". Dunham was overall satisfied with the English voicework and sound effects. Navarro called sound component (in contrast to its visuals) the game's "weakest asset", designating it with standard dub work, typical Japanese music, and unremarkable sound effects. The plot of Bujingai has been almost universally criticized, with reviewers describing it as "near nonexistent", "barely there", "weak", and one that "no one reads and characters no one gives a rip about to make it interesting". Contrarily, Dunham stated that although the game's storyline is "obviously entrenched in the same cookie cutter mold that powers just about every other action-oriented game and movie nowadays", its completion "should leave it viewers with at least some form of positive satisfaction".

== Legacy ==
Media Create sales information shows that Bujingai ranked 19th among all video game releases in Japan during its debut week, selling 43,116 copies. The game sold an additional 51,549 copies in Japan throughout 2004. Prior to the game's North American launch, Taito had considered creating a sequel. Okumura explained, "As long as the energy of the fans remains, Bujingai 2 will see the light of day!! For sure!" Despite the game's positive reception, Bujingai did not receive a console follow-up. According to a statement by Aoki in 2010, "the company wanted to go in certain directions... I did want to make more, but anyway, it didn't really happen". On March 31, 2006, South Korean film distributor SidusHQ announced that it had acquired the rights to publish a massively multiplayer online role-playing game based on Bujingai, developed by Besttoday. Besttoday CEO Jeon Jun Woo announced at ChinaJoy in July of that year that the game was in full development with plans for release in the third quarter of 2007. However, no other news of the game has since been issued.
