= Love Letter (Gackt album) =

Studio album by Gackt
- Released: February 14, 2005
- Recorded: 2005 (Recording Studio); Burnish Stone Recording Studio
- Genre: Baroque pop, folk rock, pop-folk
- Length: 51:31 (Japanese edition); 32:43 (Korean edition)
- Label: Nippon Crown
- Producer: Gackt

Gackt chronology
The Seventh Night (2004)	Love Letter (2005)	Diabolos (2005)

Singles from Love Letter
- 1. "Kimi ni Aitakute" Released: October 27, 2004; 2. "Arittake no Ai de" Released: January 26, 2005; 3. "Love Letter" Released: March 1, 2006

Love Letter is the fifth full-length studio album originally released by Japanese solo artist Gackt on February 14, 2005 in Japan.

The album had a concept theme "gift". It continues the unplugged theme of the earlier compilation album The Seventh Night but consists of new ballad material, save for the song "Dears", originally from his album Mars, and "Etude", originally from the demo tape by his indie band Cains:Feel.

A Korean language edition, titled Love Letter - For Korean Dears, was released on June 16 of the same year.

== Release ==
The album was released on February 14, 2005, by Nippon Crown. In the third counting week of February it reached number five on the Oricon chart, with sales of 41,205 copies. In the upcoming week, it was at number six respectively, with sales of 46,207 copies. It charted for 13 weeks, and sold over 120,000 copies, being certified Gold by the RIAJ. In addition to the Japanese album, a Korean language edition was released on June 16, 2005, titled Love Letter-for Korean Dears.

Preceding the album release, were released two singles, "Kimi ni Aitakute" and "Arittake no Ai de". The first single "Kimi ni Aitakute" reached number two on the second counting week of November 2004, with sales of 53,392 copies. In the upcoming two weeks, it was at number eight respectively, with sales of 18,052 and 16,417 copies. It charted for 17 weeks. In 2004, with 98,335 copies sold, it was the 96th best-selling single of the year, and sold over 124,280 copies, being certified Gold by RIAJ. The second single "Arittake no Ai de" reached number seven on the first counting week of February 2005, with sales of 39,041 copies. In the upcoming week, it was at number twenty, with sales of 9,698 copies. It charted for 7 weeks. It sold over 62,000 copies.

In March 2006, the song "Love Letter" was released, because it included the theme songs of Mobile Suit Zeta Gundam movie Love is the Pulse of the Stars. It reached number nine on the second counting week of March 2006, with sales of 17,057 copies. It charted for 7 weeks, and sold over 28,000 copies.

== Reception ==
Professional ratings
Review scores
Source	Rating
Allmusic	2.5/5 stars

Alexey Eremenko of Allmusic gave the album a rating of 2.5 out of 5 stars, observing that "going unplugged is a big artistic challenge", and Gackt fails to do it, "mainly due to his overly straightforward approach to the job". The album "is one long, slow, and dreamy acoustic ballad of the type that exhausted rockers like to close their records with to contrast the powerful riffs", and there are "no riffs, and all the songs consist of is Gackt's crooning over sparse guitar plucking or very simple piano chords; some strings may be added, but there's no rhythm section at all". He notes that Gackt "has a good, if very melodramatic voice, and the approach itself is nothing bad", but he took a "familiar approach and stretches it for a good 50 minutes", while "taken separately, every song on Love Letter is a nice and relaxing listen, but combined, they just drone on, lacking hooks, groove, hypnotic ambience". He concluded that Gackt "was looking up to Japanese pop-folk on Love Letter", possibly to Japanese folk duo "Kobukuro".

== Track listing ==
All tracks are written by Gackt C

Japanese edition
No.	Title	Length
1.	"Seiippai no Sayonara" (精一杯のサヨナラ "Goodbye with All My Strength")	4:44
2.	"Tea Cup"	5:29
3.	"Etude"	6:24
4.	"Arittake no Ai De" (ありったけの愛で "With my overflowing Love")	5:36
5.	"Peace" (ピース)	4:12
6.	"Kono Yoru Ga Owaru Mae Ni" (この夜が終わる前に "Before This Night Ends")	4:58
7.	"Kimi ni Aitakute" (君に逢いたくて "I Want to See You")	5:33
8.	"Dears"	6:58
9.	"Sakurasou" (サクラソウ "Primrose")	2:42
10.	"Love Letter"	4:55

Korean edition
No.	Title	Length
1.	"온 힘을 다하여 안녕; On Himeul Dahayeo Annyeong" ("Seiippai no Sayonara")	4:45
2.	"너를 만나고 싶지만; Neoreul Mannago Shipjiman" ("Kimi ni Aitakute")	5:33
3.	"이 밤이 끝나기 전에; I Bami Kkeunnagi Jeone" ("Kono Yoru Ga Owaru Mae Ni")	4:59
4.	"Peace"	4:13
5.	"Tea Cup"	5:30
6.	"들꽃; Deulkkot" ("Sakurasou")	2:43
7.	"Love Letter"	5:00
