= Faraway (Hoshi ni Negai o) =

Single by Gackt

from the album Re:Born
- Released: June 17, 2009
- Genre: Pop rock, Folk rock
- Label: Dears
- Songwriter(s): Gackt C.
- Producer(s): Gackt

Gackt singles chronology
"Koakuma Heaven" (2009)	"Faraway (Hoshi ni Negai o)" (2009)	"Lost Angels" (2009)

"Faraway (Hoshi ni Negai o)" (Faraway 〜星に願いを〜) is the thirty-second single by Japanese recording artist Gackt, released on June 17, 2009. This single is the second of four singles of the countdown to Gackt's 10th anniversary as solo artist. This single has been titled The 2nd Heaven.

== CD ==
No.	Title	Length
1.	"Faraway: Hoshi ni Negai o (Faraway 〜星に願いを〜)"
2.	"Oblivious: Kao no nai Tenshi (Oblivious 〜顔のない天使〜)"
3.	"Faraway: Hoshi ni Negai o (Faraway 〜星に願いを〜) (Instrumental)"
4.	"Oblivious: Kao no nai Tenshi (Oblivious 〜顔のない天使〜)"

== Charts ==
Chart (2009)	Peak position
Oricon Weekly Singles	8
Billboard Japan Hot 100	32
Billboard Japan Top Independent	1
