= Gakuto =

- Gender: Male

Origin
- Origin: Japanese
- Meaning: Different meanings depending on the kanji used

Gakuto (written: 岳人, 岳登, 岳斗, 学人 or ガクト in katakana) is a masculine Japanese given name. Notable people with the name include:

- Gakuto Coda (甲田 学人; born 1977), Japanese writer
- Gakuto Kajiwara (梶原 岳人; born 1994), Japanese voice actor
- Gakuto Kondo (近藤 岳登; born 1981), Japanese footballer
- Gakuto Mikumo (三雲 岳斗; born 1970), Japanese writer
- Gakuto Notsuda (野津田 岳人; born 1994), Japanese footballer
- Gakuto Oshiro (大城 ガクト; born 1973), better known as Gackt, Japanese musician, record producer and actor

== Fictional characters ==
- Gakuto Mukahi (向日 岳人), a character in the manga series The Prince of Tennis
- Gakuto Shimazu (島津 岳人), a character in the visual novel Maji de Watashi ni Koi Shinasai!
