= Hanaboy =

J-Pop band

Hanaboy is a two-member J-pop band under Nippon Crown Records label. The band was established in January 2003 by Miwako (Vocals & Piano) and Kentaro (Drums). The band released two albums and one single under the independent record label Hills Records before making their major record debut through Nippon Crown Records by releasing their mini-album, The South Pole. Bassist Macoto joined the band in 2005 but left under mutual agreement in November 2007. Drummer Kentaro followed suit by leaving the band in May 2008 to pursue other musical interests.

The song "The Brand New Morning", featured on their album Beausicle, has been used for a television commercial for Yakult. In 2006 the band performed live at the Shibuya duo music exchange.

== Band members ==
=== Current members ===
- Miwako (Vocals & Piano): 2003 Jan ~ present

=== Former members ===
- Kentaro (Drums): 2003 Jan ~ 2008 May 15)
- Macoto (Bass Guitar): 2003 Jan ~ 2007 Oct 18

== Discography ==
=== Singles ===
- [2006.06.21] Kimi ni Aeru Kisetsu (キミに会える季節)

=== Mini albums ===
- [?] Hanaboy (Indies Release)
- [2005.04.26] into the Light (Indies Release)
- [2007.06.20] Your Summer (Major Label Debut)
- [2007.10.10] The South Pole

=== Albums ===
- [2005.09.07] Flowers (Indies Release)
- [2006.10.18] Beausicle
