= Chachamaru =

Japanese musician

- Born: 藤村幸宏 (Yukihiro Fujimura); March 3, 1960 (age 66); Kyoto Prefecture, Japan
- Genres: Rock, Metal, Blues
- Occupations: Guitarist, singer, composer, producer, arranger
- Instruments: Guitar, Shamisen
- Years active: 1983–present
- Label: Nippon Crown
- Formerly of: Gerard, Vienna, Ded Chaplin

Yukihiro Fujimura (藤村幸宏, Yukihiro Fujimura; born March 3, 1960, in Kyoto Prefecture, Japan), is a Japanese guitarist, singer-songwriter, arranger and producer. Usually referred to by his stage name Chachamaru, little is known about his early years and personal life. Besides being a member and collaborator with various bands and musical acts in the 1980s and 1990s, he is most known as being the lead guitarist and associate music producer for Gackt.

== Biography ==
Yukihiro "Chachamaru" Fujimura was born in Kyoto Prefecture, Japan, on March 3, 1960. He was a student at the Bukkyo University, a private university with a philosophy based on Pure Land Buddhism.

In 1983, Fujimura was the co-founder, lead vocalist and guitarist of the progressive rock band Gerard. The band were signed to King Records until 1986, when the band disbanded because the label no longer supported progressive music. After a two-year break, he joined Shusei Tsukamoto in forming the progressive/hard rock band Vienna, performing guitar and vocal duties. In the same year they released their first album Overture. After recording one more album and a live record, Vienna went on a hiatus. In 1989, Fujimura worked as a session guitarist for Minoru Niihara's metal band Ded Chaplin on their first album Ded Chaplin 1st.

In 1990 he participated in the Gerard reunion for a new recording, although left the band shortly after due to musical differences. Not long after, he joined Niihara and re-formed Ded Chaplin. Over the next two years, they released two studio albums and a best-of compilation The Best Works of Ded Chaplin before disbanding. From 1994 to 1995 he joined Toshi of X Japan on his second studio album Grace and on tour as a guitarist and backing vocalist. In the next year, he adopted his stage name "Chachamaru" and joined the sessions of the hard rock band Girl U Need's self-titled album. He also joined the Vienna reunion and released an album with them called Unknown, before they disbanded once more.

Since the year 2000, Chachamaru has worked with the solo artist Gackt, serving as an associate producer and the lead guitarist for his live band, as well as backing vocalist. Over the next few years, he would work with Gackt and be a part of his support band Gacktjob. Acting as their main guitarist and helping Gackt with production of some of his songs.

== Music style and technique ==
As a lead guitarist, Chachamaru is known for his technical playing style and also for his unique tuning. His playing style draws influence from many heavy metal guitarists who came to prominence in the 1970s–80s. His musical style varies from progressive rock, metal, soul and blues and features some more experimental playing.

== Guitar legacy ==
At the time, Jackson/Charvel luthier Itaru Kanno designed several guitar models for the companies, among them the 27-fret Jackson Falcon Custom for Chachamaru, a guitar never sold outside Japan. Around 1994, when Jackson's contract with the Japanese trading company Kyowa-Shokai expired and they opted not to renew their contact with Jackson guitars, Itaru was one of the main designers at the Chushin Gakki factory. In 1995, he established a new guitar company, the Caparison Guitars. Their 27-fret The Caparison Horus made its debut that same year, and more than ten years later, the collaboration with Chachamaru is still ongoing.

== Discography ==
In 2002, Chachamaru released the solo album Air. It features musicians such as Niihara, Gackt, Shinya, Shusei Tsukamoto, Masafumi Nishida, Ryuichi Nishida, and You Kurosaki.

Albums

All tracks are written by Chachamaru,.

*Air (December 21, 2002)
No.	Title	Length
1.	"Air"	1:08
2.	"Divine"	5:11
3.	"As"	4:22
4.	"Naked"	4:22
5.	"Kagero" (sung by Gackt)	6:23
6.	"Luscious"	5:31
7.	"Metamorphose"	4:43
8.	"Canone"	10:38
9.	"Grieve"	7:34
