= Love Letter (Gackt song) =

Single by Gackt

from the album Love Letter
- A-side: "Love Letter"
- B-side: "Dybbuk"
- Released: March 1, 2006
- Genre: Baroque pop/Rap rock
- Length: 8:34
- Label: Nippon Crown
- Songwriter(s): Gackt C.
- Producer(s): Gackt

Gackt singles chronology
"Redemption" (2006)	"Love Letter" (2006)	"No ni Saku Hana no Youni" (2007)

Music video
- "Love Letter" on YouTube

"Love Letter" is a single released by Gackt on March 1, 2006 under Nippon Crown. It peaked at ninth place on the Oricon weekly chart and charted for seven weeks. The A-side and B-side were used in the Mobile Suit Zeta Gundam movie Love is the Pulse of the Stars (星の鼓動は愛, Hoshi no kodō wa ai), as opening and ending themes, respectively. "Dybbuk" also previously appeared on Gackt's 2003 album Crescent. It was certified gold by RIAJ.

== Track listing ==
No.	Title	Length
1.	"Love Letter"	5:01
2.	"Dybbuk (remix version)"	3:33
