= Jesus (Gackt song) =

Single by Gackt

from the album Re:Born
- Released: December 3, 2008 (Regular); November 26, 2008 (Limited)
- Genre: Hard rock, alternative metal, classical
- Length: 17:33
- Label: Dears
- Songwriter: Gackt C.
- Producer: Gackt

Gackt singles chronology
"Returner (Yami no Shūen)" (2007)	"Jesus" (2008)	"Ghost" (2009)

Music video
- "Jesus" on YouTube

"Jesus" is the 28th single by Japanese musical artist Gackt, released on December 3, 2008.

== Summary ==
"Jesus" marked the beginning of Gackt's return to the music scene after a year with no releases. The story of ЯR Project began in 2001 with the release of the album Rebirth and the Requiem et Reminiscence tour. The sequel to the story was the Gackt Visualive Tour Requiem et Reminiscence II 2008–2009 tour, which he explained in detail on his website through "Asakura's Report".

"Jesus" is Gackt's first single release from his own label Dears, but still supported by Nippon Crown. A limited-edition version with a Promotional Video (PV) was released on November 26, 2008, for members of Gackt's official fan club, Dears, and the regular edition was released on December 3, 2008.

The single is partly in English. In 2009, Gackt stated in a French magazine interview that Metallica's song "One" influenced his song "Jesus". Part of the song is an homage to "One".

"Jesus" was covered in English by Gackt's band Yellow Fried Chickenz and performed live including at Makuhari Messe in 2011. It was released on the DVD World Tour *Show Ur Soul.I* i.e (Show your soul!) 世壊傷結愛魂祭 at Makuhari 2011 in 2012.

== Music video ==
The music video shows a man unable to bear his sins; meanwhile, Gackt and the band members, as human-like demons, are singing and playing near him. The man ends up shooting himself in the head following the whispers of the "God of death". According to Gackt, it is a painful song which is not about asking God for help yet listening to God.

== Track listing ==
All lyrics are written by Gackt.C; all music is composed by Gackt.C.

No.	Title	Length
1.	"Jesus"	3:37
2.	"Sayonara -ЯR II ver.-"	5:14
3.	"Jesus (Instrumental)"	3:36
4.	"Sayonara -ЯR II ver.- (Instrumental)"	5:06

== Charts ==
Chart (2008)	Peak position
Oricon Weekly Singles	7
Billboard Japan Hot 100	41
Billboard Japan Top Independent	2
