= Redemption (Gackt song) =

Single by Gackt
- A-side: "Redemption"
- B-side: "Longing"
- Released: January 25, 2006
- Genre: Hard rock, Progressive rock
- Length: 16:15
- Label: Nippon Crown
- Songwriter(s): Gackt C.
- Producer(s): Gackt

Gackt singles chronology
"Todokanai Ai to Shitteita..." (2005)	"Redemption" (2006)	"Love Letter" (2006)

Music video
- "Redemption" on YouTube

"Redemption" is a song recorded by Japanese musician Gackt and released as a single on January 25, 2006, by Nippon Crown. "Redemption" serves as the theme song for the video game Dirge of Cerberus: Final Fantasy VII, while the B-side, "Longing", is also used in the game as an insert song.

It peaked at third place on the Oricon singles chart and charted for twelve weeks. In 2006, it was the 83rd best selling single with sales of 124,955 copies, making it to be Gackt's eighth best selling single. It was certified gold by RIAJ.

== Summary ==
In late 2005, Gackt was involved with the Final Fantasy VII franchise, for Square Enix's PlayStation 2 video game Dirge of Cerberus, released on January 26, 2006. Gackt composed and performed two theme songs for the game, "Longing" and "Redemption", and were released as a single, separately from the game's original soundtrack, but were included in its release a month later. For the game's ending theme, "Redemption", the staff originally planned for it to be a ballad, but Gackt decided to make it a rock song instead. Upon hearing Gackt's ideas, the staff were pleased with the direction in which he had gone.

In addition to contributing music, the character Genesis Rhapsodos was modeled on, voiced and co-created by Gackt, and Gackt also acted as the character in a brief appearance during an optional ending of the game. Though introduced as a character with a very limited presence, Genesis had an integral role in the 2007 video game Crisis Core.

A limited edition of the single was published as well, containing a DVD with separate music videos of the title track: one is in a conventional style, featuring the artist; the other is composed of footage from the video game Dirge of Cerberus. Gackt performed "Redemption" on the Diabolos: Aien no Shi tour in 2005, and played it extensively throughout his solo career.

Gackt considered its music video one of his hardest to film, saying "we had to push back 18 hours from the time we were originally scheduled to film. We stayed up all night filming in a cold and ruined warehouse".

== Track listing ==
No.	Title	Length
1.	"Redemption"	4:07
2.	"Longing"	4:06
3.	"Redemption (instrumental)"	4:06
4.	"Longing (instrumental)"	3:58

== See also ==
- Music of the Final Fantasy VII series
