= Koakuma Heaven =

Single by Gackt

from the album Re:Born
- Released: June 10, 2009
- Recorded: 2008
- Genre: Electropop, Pop rock
- Label: Dears
- Songwriter(s): Gackt C.
- Producer(s): Gackt

Gackt singles chronology
"Journey Through the Decade" (2009)	"Koakuma Heaven" (2009)	"Faraway (Hoshi ni Negai o)" (2009)

Alternative cover
- Dears only

"Koakuma Heaven" (小悪魔ヘヴン, Koakuma Hevun) is the thirty-first single by Japanese musical artist Gackt, released on June 10, 2009. This single was the first of four singles of the countdown to Gackt's 10th anniversary as a solo artist. This single was titled The 1st Heaven. Each of the countdown singles were scheduled to be released within a week of each other.

The second song on the single, "My Father's Day" was written in memory of Gackt's Fūrin Kazan co-actor and close friend, Ken Ogata.

== Record jacket ==
On its record jacket, "Koakuma Heaven" features a total of 15 female models, such as Sayaka Araki and Sayo Hayakawa, who have appeared in the popular gyaru magazine Koakuma Ageha. The fanclub-only version of the jacket features only Gackt dressed as a woman.

== Track listing ==
No.	Title	Length
1.	"Koakuma Heaven (小悪魔ヘヴン)"
2.	"My Father's Day"
3.	"Koakuma Heaven (小悪魔ヘヴン) (Instrumental)"
4.	"My Father's Day (Instrumental)"

== Charts ==
Chart (2009)	Peak position
Oricon Weekly Singles	6
Billboard Japan Hot 100	38
Billboard Japan Top Independent	2
