= Ghost (Gackt song) =

Single by Gackt

from the album Re:Born
- Released: January 28, 2009 (Regular); January 21, 2009 (Limited)
- Genre: Electronic rock, art rock
- Length: 16:04
- Label: Dears
- Songwriter: Gackt C.
- Producer: Gackt

Gackt singles chronology
"Jesus" (2008)	"Ghost" (2009)	"Journey Through the Decade" (2009)

Music video
- "Ghost" on YouTube

"Ghost" is the twenty-ninth single by Japanese musical artist Gackt, released on January 28, 2009.

== Summary ==
"Ghost" continues the concept from the Requiem et Reminiscence II 2008-2009 tour and the Asakura Report, began by the release of single "Jesus". The song is used as the theme to the Japanese broadcast of Terminator: The Sarah Connor Chronicles.

A limited-edition version with a PV was released on January 21, 2009, for members of Gackt's official fanclub, Dears, and the regular edition was released on January 28, 2009.

== Music video ==
There are two versions of the music video that exist, one of which features clips from Terminator: The Sarah Connor Chronicles.

The video starts off in a darkened locker room where shards of glass and metal lie on the floor. A male Caucasian janitor arrives with a mop and bucket and starts cleaning up the debris. Afterward, he moves on to the next room, which is a laboratory also in a mess, switches on a light and continues cleaning, unaware that there are five shadowy figures standing in the background, each with glowing red eyes. The janitor gets his iPod Touch out to select some music to listen to while cleaning up the mess and whilst mopping, he accidentally hits a button that causes the ceiling light to send out blasts of electricity, which hits and shatters some glasses and zaps the figures, revealing them to be Gackt and his backup dancers, who are androids. As a result of the electricity's impact, they come to life and the janitor stops what he is doing and looks on in shock.

Close-up shots of Gackt singing the lyrics are shown and he has metallic scars on his face, giving him the appearance of a damaged android.

== Track listing ==
All lyrics are written by Gackt.C; all music is composed by Gackt.C.

No.	Title	Length
1.	"Ghost"	4:07
2.	"Blue Lagoon: Shinkai (Blue Lagoon ～深海～)"	4:33
3.	"Ghost (Instrumental)"	4:06
4.	"Blue Lagoon: Shinkai (Blue Lagoon ～深海～) (Instrumental)"	4:28

== Charts ==
Chart (2009)	Peak position
Oricon Weekly Singles	6
Billboard Japan Hot 100	33
Billboard Japan Top Independent	1
