= Returner (Yami no Shūen) =

Single by Gackt

from the album Last Moon
- Released: June 20, 2007
- Genre: Symphonic rock, Hard rock
- Length: 20:46
- Label: Nippon Crown
- Songwriter: Gackt C.
- Producer: Gackt

Gackt singles chronology
"No ni Saku Hana no Youni" (2007)	"Returner (Yami no Shūen)" (2007)	"Jesus" (2008)

Music video
- "Returner (Yami no Shūen)" on YouTube

"Returner (Yami no Shūen)" (Returner ～闇の終焉～; lit. "Returner: Demise of Darkness") is a single released by Gackt, on June 20, 2007, by Nippon Crown. It is Gackt's first single to top the Oricon Singles Chart, and first by record label since Kaze's "22-Sai no Wakare" released in 1975.

== Summary ==
In 2006, Gackt continued his tour "Diabolos: Aien no Shi" with a concert on January 14, in Korea, at Fencing Stadium in Korean Olympic Park, which was his first Asian solo concert. In August at an Otakon conference, it was publicly announced that he would form a band S.K.I.N with the co-founder of the Japanese famous metal band X Japan, Yoshiki, for which the idea origins in 2002. With the band still in formation, Gackt on December 24 went on a small nationwide fanclub rock tour "D.r.u.g. Party", which was also continued with four concerts in Korea and Taiwan. In January 2007, Gackt starred in the NHK Taiga drama Fūrin Kazan, where portrayed the warlord Uesugi Kenshin. Next week, after the single release, on June 29 was held the debut concert of S.K.I.N. at the Anime Expo in Long Beach, California, called the "Japanese rock concert of the century". Although there were high expectations by the public, and Gackt and Yoshiki themselves, all activities were suddenly stopped.

=== Release ===
The single was released in a regular and limited edition, which beside the title song also included two live recordings of previously published songs "Cube" and "Birdcage" from late 2006 D.r.u.g Party tour, only the limited edition to come with the music video for the title song. The inspiration for the image used in this single ties into the NHK drama Fūrin Kazan, in which Gackt plays the warlord Uesugi Kenshin. Gackt performed the song live on the 58th Kōhaku Uta Gassen.

The single topped the Oricon Singles Chart on the day it was released, and on the initially counting week of July, with sales of 43,275 copies. In the upcoming week, it was at number nine, with sales of 11,257 copies. It charted for 11 weeks, and sold over 70,000 copies.

=== Music video ===
In the music video samurais are arriving and fighting at the battlefield, but the background behind this song is a woman waiting for the return of her lover from the battlefield, as Gackt sings the lyrics from the woman's perspective while playing the role of the husband in the video. The husband dies in the battle and never comes back. The armor of Gackt is the armor of Uesugi Kenshin used in the movie Heaven and Earth.

== Track listing ==
All lyrics are written by Gackt.C; all music is composed by Gackt.C.

No.	Title	Length
1.	"Returner (Yami no Shūen) (Returner ～闇の終焉～)"	4:21
2.	"Cube (Drug I Ver.)"	5:35
3.	"Birdcage (Drug I Ver.)"	6:37
4.	"Returner (Yami no Shūen) (Instrumental)"	4:14

== Notes ==
- "Returner" is Gackt's first single to reach the number one spot on the Japanese Oricon weekly charts.
- The song was used as the theme song for the Japanese release of the movie The Prestige.
