= Flower (Gackt song) =

Single by Gackt

from the album Re:Born
- Released: July 1, 2009
- Genre: Hard rock, Progressive rock
- Label: Dears
- Songwriter(s): Gackt C.
- Producer(s): Gackt

Gackt singles chronology
| "Lost Angels" (2009) | "Flower" (2009) | "The Next Decade" (2009) |

Music video
- "Flower" on YouTube

"Flower" is the thirty-fourth single by Japanese recording artist Gackt, released on July 1, 2009. This single is the final of the four singles of the countdown to Gackt's 10th anniversary as solo artist. Each of the countdown singles were released within a week of each other. There are two versions of the music video.

== CD ==
| No. | Title | Length |
|---|---|---|
| 1. | "Flower" |
| 2. | "In Flames" |
| 3. | "Flower (instrumental)" |
| 4. | "In Flames (instrumental)" |

== Charts ==
| Chart (2009) | Peak position |
|---|---|
| Oricon Weekly Singles | 7 |
| Billboard Japan Hot 100 | 30 |
| Billboard Japan Top Independent | 1 |
