= Nippon Crown =

Japanese record label

- Parent company: Nippon Columbia (pre-1963); Mitsubishi Electric (1963—2001); Daiichi Kosho Company (2001—present)
- Founded: September 6, 1963
- Distributor: self-distributed
- Genre: various
- Country of origin: Japan
- Official website: http://www.crownrecord.co.jp/

Nippon Crown Co., Ltd. (日本クラウン株式会社, Nippon Kuraun Kabushikaisha) is a Japanese record label established as Crown Records on 6 September 1963. It is a spin-off of Nippon Columbia and is owned by karaoke maker Daiichikosho. The record label singles which topped the Oricon Singles Chart are Kaze's "22-Sai no Wakare" (1975), and Gackt's "Returner (Yami no Shūen)" (2007).

== Artists ==
Artists signed to Nippon Crown include:

- Band-Maid (on sublabel Revolver Records) (until 2020)
- Bis (on sublabel Revolver Records)
- BRADIO
- Date of Birth (Dob) (on sublabel Hasin Music)
- Mao Denda
- Gackt (later on independent sublabel Dears)
- Hanaboy
- Haruomi Hosono
- Karen na Ivory
- Tomomi Kasai
- Kimeru
- Saburō Kitajima
- Metis
- mizca
- Man with a Mission
- Lovely Doll
- Nightmare
- Mayo Okamoto
- Paradisio
- Predia (on sublabel Revolver Records)
- Psycho le Cému
- Seo In-guk
- Taeko Ohnuki
- Unchain (on sublabel Revolver Records)
- Vidoll
- Zigzo (on sublabel Crown Stones)

== See also ==
- List of record labels
- Daiichi Kosho Company
- Nippon Columbia
- Mitsubishi Electric (Nippon Crown's former shareholder)
