= Miyavi discography =

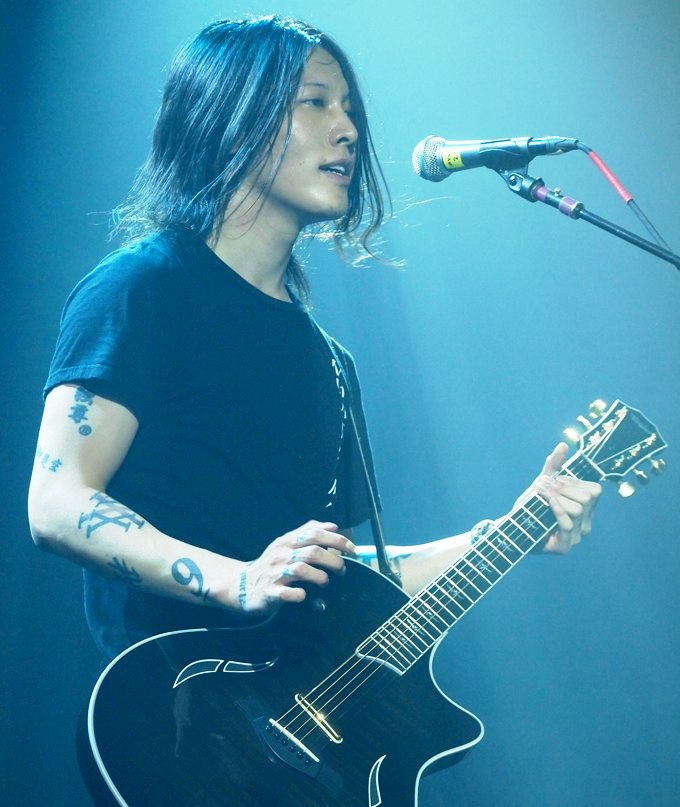
- Studio albums: 16
- EPs: 2
- Live albums: 1
- Compilation albums: 4
- Singles: 41
- Remix albums: 1

Japanese musician Miyavi has released 16 studio albums, 2 EPs and 41 singles as of 2022. Chart rankings are weekly, unless otherwise stated.

== Studio albums ==
| Title | Album details | Peak chart positions | | Sales (JPN) |
| Title | Album details | Oricon | Billboard Japan | Sales (JPN) |
|---|---|---|---|---|
| Gagaku | Released: October 31, 2002 | — | — | |
| Galyuu | Released: December 2, 2003 | 44 | — | 7,000 |
| Miyavizm | Released: June 1, 2005 | 10 | — | 18,000 |
| MYV Pops | Released: August 2, 2006 | 15 | — | 14,000 |
| Miyaviuta -Dokusou- | Released: September 13, 2006 | 25 | — | 7,000 |
| This Iz the Japanese Kabuki Rock | Released: March 19, 2008 | 25 | 27 | 11,000 |
| What's My Name? | Released: October 13, 2010 | 26 | 33 | 5,000 |
| Miyavi | Released: June 19, 2013 | 8 | 8 | 19,000 |
| The Others | Released: April 15, 2015 | 10 | 9 | 9,000 |
| Fire Bird | Released: 31 August 2016 | 11 | 11 | 6,000 |
| Samurai Sessions, Vol. 2 | Released: November 8, 2017 | 11 | 9 | 9,000 |
| Samurai Sessions Vol.3: Worlds Collide | Release: December 5, 2018 | 32 | 27 | 3,268 |
| No Sleep Till Tokyo | Release: July 24, 2019 | 17 | 17 | 4,255 |
| Holy Nights | Released: April 22, 2020 | 11 | 11 | 3,048 |
| Imaginary | Release date: September 15, 2021 | 25 | 18 | 2,269 |
| Lost in Love, Found in Pain | Release date: October 23, 2024 | 25 | — | 1,295 |
"—" denotes a recording that did not chart or was not released in that territory.

== EPs ==
| Title | Album details | Peak chart positions | | Sales (JPN) |
| Title | Album details | Oricon | Billboard Japan | Sales (JPN) |
|---|---|---|---|---|
| 7 Samurai Sessions -We're Kavki Boiz- | Released: July 18, 2007 | 44 | − | 6,000 |
| Samurai Sessions vol.1 | Released: November 14, 2012 | 21 | 17 | 16,000 |
"—" denotes a recording that did not chart or was not released in that territory.

== Compilation albums ==
| Title | Album details | Peak chart positions | | Sales (JPN) |
| Title | Album details | Oricon | Billboard Japan | Sales (JPN) |
|---|---|---|---|---|
| Azn Pride -This Iz the Japanese Kabuki Rock- | Released: June 27, 2008 (Taiwan and Korea) 27 August 2008 (Japan) | 44 | 54 | 4,000 |
| Victory Road to the King of Neo Visual Rock | Released: April 22, 2009 | 65 | 91 | 3,000 |
| Fan's Best | Released: March 24, 2010 | 212 | — | 1,000 |
| All Time Best "Day 2" | Released: April 5, 2017 | 14 | 13 | 8,000 |
"—" denotes a recording that did not chart or was not released in that territory.

== Remix albums ==
| Title | Album details | Peak chart positions | | Sales (JPN) |
| Title | Album details | Oricon | Billboard Japan | Sales (JPN) |
|---|---|---|---|---|
| Room No. 382 | Released: December 24, 2008 | 127 | 89 | 4,000 |

== Live albums ==
| Title | Album details |
|---|---|
| Live in London 2011 | Released: May 2, 2011 |

== Singles ==
=== As a lead artist ===
| Title | Year | Peak chart positions | | | Sales (JPN) | Album |
| Title | Year | Oricon | JPN Sales | JPN Hot 100 | Sales (JPN) | Album |
|---|---|---|---|---|---|---|
| "死んでも Boogie-Woogie" ("Shindemo Boogie-Woogie") | 2002 | — | — | — | | Non-album single |
| "Pop Is Dead" | 2002 | — | — | — | | Non-album single |
| "ジングルベル" ('Jingle Bell") | 2002 | 40 | — | — | 7,000 | Non-album single |
| "自分革命-2003"- ("Jibun Kakumei-2003-") | 2003 | 30 | — | — | 6,000 | Non-album single |
| "タリラリタララ" ("Tariraritarara") | 2003 | 42 | — | — | 6,000 | Non-album single |
| "Coo Quack Cluck -ク・ク・ル"- ("Coo Quack Cluck -Ku. Ku. Ru-") | 2003 | 43 | — | — | 4,000 | Galyuu |
| "あしタ、元気ニなぁレ" (Ashita, Genki ni Naare) | 2004 | 22 | — | — | 11,000 | Non-album single |
| "ロックの逆襲–スーパースターの条件" ("Rock no Gyakushuu -Super Star no Jouken-") | 2004 | 10 | — | — | 29,000 | Miyavizm |
| "21世紀型行進曲" ("21 Seikigata Koushinkyoku") | 2004 | 10 | — | — | 29,000 | Non-album single |
| "Freedom Fighters" | 2005 | 10 | — | — | 18,000 | Miyavizm |
| "結婚式の唄" ("Kekkonshiki no Uta") | 2005 | 6 | — | — | 29,000 | MYV Pops |
| "Are You Ready to Rock?" | 2005 | 6 | — | — | 29,000 | MYV Pops |
| "セニョール セニョーラ セニョリータ" ("Señor Señora Señorita") | 2006 | 10 | — | — | 25,000 | MYV Pops |
| "Gigpigブギ" ("Gigpig Boogie") | 2006 | 10 | — | — | 25,000 | MYV Pops |
| "Dear My Friend" | 2006 | 6 | — | — | 21,000 | MYV Pops |
| "愛しい人" ("Itoshii Hito") | 2006 | 6 | — | — | 21,000 | MYV Pops |
| "君に願いを" ("Kimi Ni Negai Wo") | 2006 | 26 | — | — | 11,000 | MYV Pops |
| "咲き誇る華の様に" ("Sakihokoru Hana no You Ni") | 2007 | 12 | — | — | 17,000 | This Iz the Japanese Kabuki Rock |
| "歌舞伎男子" ("Kabuki Boiz") | 2007 | 12 | — | — | 17,000 | This Iz the Japanese Kabuki Rock |
| "素晴らしきかな、この世界" ("Subarashikikana, Kono Sekai") | 2007 | 13 | — | — | 15,000 | This Iz the Japanese Kabuki Rock |
| "陽の光さえ届かないこ場所での" ("Hi no Hikari Sae Todokanai Kono Basho De" feat. Sugizo) | 2008 | 10 | 11 | 40 | 11,000 | This Iz the Japanese Kabuki Rock |
| "Survive" | 2010 | — | — | — | | What's My Name? |
| "Torture" | 2010 | 26 | 36 | — | 4,000 | What's My Name? |
| "What's My Name?" | 2011 | 57 | 54 | 75 | 2,000 | What's My Name? |
| "Strong" (with Kreva) | 2011 | — | 19 | 15 | 3,000 | Samurai Sessions vol.1 |
| "Day 1" (with Yuksek) | 2012 | — | 38 | 66 | | Samurai Sessions vol.1 |
| "Ahead of the Light" | 2013 | 21 | 17 | 21 | 6,000 | Miyavi |
| "Horizon" | 2013 | – | – | 49 | | Miyavi |
| "Real?" | 2014 | 23 | 19 | 31 | 4,000 | Non-album single |
| "Let Go" | 2014 | — | — | – | | The Others |
| "The Others" | 2015 | — | — | 46 | | The Others |
| "Afraid to Be Cool" | 2016 | — | — | — | | Fire Bird |
| "Raise Me Up" | 2016 | — | — | — | | Fire Bird |
| "Live to Die Another Day" | 2017 | — | — | – | | All Time Best "Day 2" |
| "Long Nights (World Mix)" | 2018 | — | — | — | | Fire Bird |
| "In Crowd" | 2018 | — | — | — | | Samurai Sessions Vol.3 - Worlds Collide - |
| "So On It" | 2018 | — | — | – | | Non-album single |
| "Get Into My Heart" (with Kavka Shishido) | 2018 | — | — | – | | Samurai Sessions Vol.3 - Worlds Collide - |
| "1000 Miles Away" | 2019 | — | — | – | | Non-album single |
| "Where Home Is" | 2019 | — | — | – | | Non-album single |
| "千客万来" ("Senkyakubanrai" with DAOKO) | 2019 | — | — | 65 | | No Sleep Till Tokyo |
| "Bang!" | 2020 | — | — | – | | Holy Nights |
| "Need for Speed" | 2020 | — | — | – | | Holy Nights |
| "Holy Nights" | 2020 | — | — | – | | Holy Nights |
| "Over the Rainbow" | 2020 | — | — | – | | Non-album single |
| "New Gravity" | 2021 | — | — | – | | Imaginary |
| "Imaginary" (feat. Kimbra) | 2021 | — | — | – | | Imaginary |
| "Strike It Out" | 2022 | 59 | 63 | – | | Non-album single |
| "Futurism" | 2022 | – | – | – | | Non-album single |
| "Ring Em Up" | 2022 | – | – | – | | Non-album single |
| "Rays" | 2023 | – | – | – | | Non-album single |
| "Broken Fantasy / Tragedy Of Us" | 2024 | – | – | – | | Lost In Love |
| "Running In My Head" | 2024 | 38 | 77 | – | 1,000 | Non-album single |
"—" denotes a recording that did not chart or was not released in that territory.

=== Other charted songs ===
List of songs not released as singles or promotional singles, with selected chart positions and certifications
| Title | Year | Peak chart positions | Album |
| Title | Year | JPN Hot 100 | Album |
|---|---|---|---|
| "Unite" (feat. Rob Harvey) | 2015 | 93 | The Others |
| "Snakes" (with PVRIS) | 2021 | — | Arcane (Soundtrack from the Animated Series) |
"—" denotes a recording that did not chart or was not released in that territory.

== Charitable works ==
- A Piece of Water (iTunes Store, December 6, 2006)
  - "Christmas is..."
  - "Entre la soledad y el recuerdo" (guitars)
- Nippon Shiyouzi Noriko Rock Selection - Fankimonkibaibureshon ~Solo~ (君にファンキーモンキーバイブレーション~独奏?~, January 24, 2007)

== Videography ==
- Gekokujou (激レア, Live concert, July 23, 2003)
- Hitorigei (一人芸, Music video compilation, August 21, 2004)
- Indies Last Live in Nihon Budokan (インディーズ・ラスト LIVE in 日本武道館, Live concert, December 1, 2004)
- Noriko no Ichi (のり子の一日, Live documentary, January 12, 2005)
- Hitorigei 2 (一人芸2, Music video compilation, December 7, 2005)
- Hitorigei 3 (一人芸3, Music video compilation, December 20, 2006)
- 25 Shunen Kinen Koen Tokyo Geijutsu Gekijo 5 Days -Dokuso- (25周年記念公演・東京芸術劇場5days 〜独奏〜, Live concert, May 2, 2007)
- The Beginning of Neo Visualizm Tour 2007 (Live concert, May 7, 2008)
- Official Bootleg Live at Shinkiba Coast (Live concert, May 7, 2008)
- This Iz The Original Samurai Style (Music video compilation, December 24, 2008)
- Nariagari (Shaku) 2003.10.19 Hibiya Yagai Daiongakudo (成り上がり（借） 2003.10.19 HIBIYA YAGAI DAIONGAKUDO; Live concert, May 22, 2009)
- Neo Tokyo Samurai Black World Tour vol.1 (Tour Documentary, March 24, 2010)
- Miyavi, The Guitar Artist Slap The World Tour 2014 (September 10, 2014)
