= Hitorigei 3 =

- Regular edition cover

Video by Miyavi
- Released: January 17, 2007; November 21, 2007 (Reissue)
- Genre: Rock/pop
- Language: Japanese
- Label: PS Company/Universal
- Director: Kazuyoshi Oku, Tsuyoshi Inoue, Naoko Miyowaka, Ryo Nagai, Shingo Goto
- Producer: Koichi Kotani, Koichiro Nogawa, MYV

Miyavi video releases chronology
Hitorigei 2 (2005)	Hitorigei 3 (2007)	25 Shunen Kinen Koen... (2007)

Alternative cover
- Limited edition cover

Hitorigei 3 (一人芸3) is a music video compilation released by Miyavi on December 20, 2006. It contains the videos for all singles from the Myv Pops album, extras include making-of features, television ads, footage of Miyavi filmed in Korea and touring footage presented in a documentary-like manner and quality.

The compilation was reissued on November 21, 2007, making all of the original limited edition content available again. The reissue was also a limited release.

== Track listing ==
No.	Title	Length
1.	"Kekkonshiki no Uta" (結婚式の唄)
2.	"Are You Ready to Rock?"
3.	"Senor Senora Senorita" (セニョール セニョーラ セニョリータ。)
4.	"Gigpig Boogie" (Gigpigブギ)
5.	"Dear My Friend -Tegami wo Kaku yo-" (Dear My Friend-手紙を書くよ-)
6.	"Itoshii Hito (Beta de Suman) -2006 Ver.-" (愛しい人 (ベタですまん。))
7.	"Kimi ni Negai Wo" (君に願いを)

== Personnel ==
- Tomomi Ozaki – executive producer
- Atsushi Kitamura – executive producer

Music videos

- Koichi Kotani – producer
- Koichiro Nogawa – producer
- Kazuyoshi Oku – director (Track 1 and 2)
- Tsuyoshi Inoue – director (Track 3, 5 and 6)
- Naoko Miyowaka – director (Track 4)

Live and documentary footage

- Ryo Nagai – live director
- Shingo Goto – live director
