= The Last Rockstars =

Japanese rock supergroup

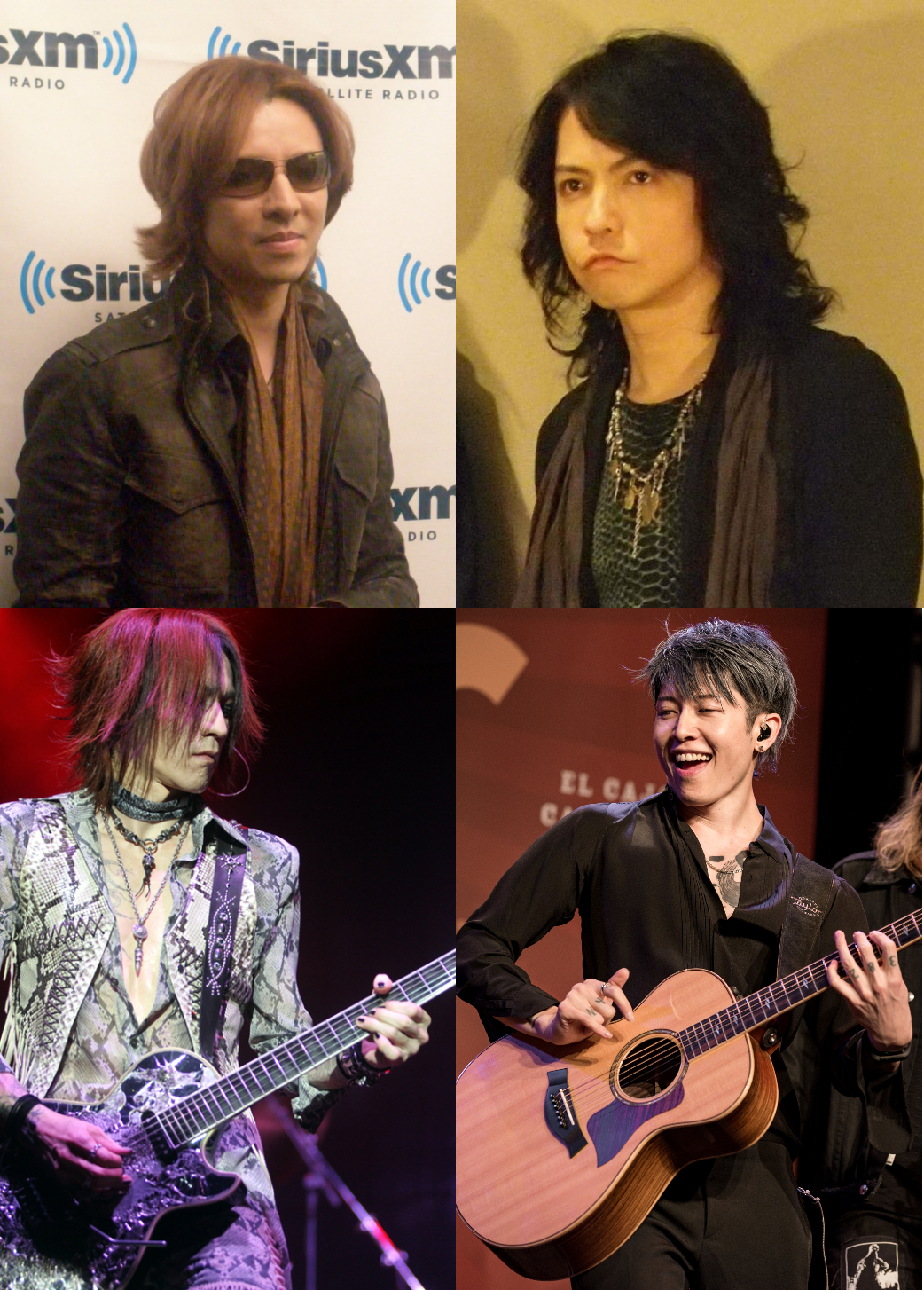
- Clockwise from top left: Yoshiki, Hyde, Miyavi, and Sugizo

Background information
- Origin: Tokyo, Japan
- Genres: Rock
- Years active: 2022–present
- Label: Melodee Music
- Members: Yoshiki; Hyde; Sugizo
- Past members: Miyavi
- Website: thelastrockstars.net

The Last Rockstars is a Japanese rock supergroup formed in 2022 by Yoshiki (X Japan), Hyde (L'Arc-en-Ciel, Vamps), Sugizo (X Japan, Luna Sea), and Miyavi (ex-Dué le Quartz). The four members announced their collaboration in November 2022, and released their first self-titled single in December of the same year. In January 2023, the band performed their debut tour in Japan and the United States. In November 2024, it was announced that Miyavi had left the band.

== History ==
The group members Yoshiki, Sugizo and Miyavi were previously part of the short-lived rock supergroup Skin in 2007. The formation of The Last Rockstars was announced at a press conference in Tokyo on November 11, 2022, when the three members with singer Hyde also announced a pair of upcoming single and several concerts scheduled for January and February 2023. Yoshiki stated that the mission of the group was to "aim at the international market beyond Japan" and to "preserve the spirit of rock music," which the musician claimed has been overtaken in the modern music scene by pop and hip-hop. The provocative name was chosen "to leave an impression".

On December 14, the band announced a second New York City show had been added to the tour schedule due to high demand, followed by the announcement that the band would release their music through Melodee Music/Ingrooves, a sub-label of Universal Music and Virgin Music Group. On December 23, The Last Rockstars released their debut single, "The Last Rockstars (Paris Mix)". On December 31, the members made their debut performance as a band on NHK's New Year's Eve music program 73rd NHK Kōhaku Uta Gassen, setting a record by performing on the nationwide program just eight days after the release of their first single.

In January 2023, the group launched their first international tour with sold-out shows in Tokyo, New York, and Los Angeles, performing in addition to many new songs several self-covers by Skin, X Japan, Yoshiki, L'Arc-en-Ciel, Hyde and Miyavi. On August 4, the band released their second single, "Psycho Love". On November 21, the band began their second international tour at Ariake Arena in Tokyo, though the Los Angeles date which had been announced for November 29 was postponed until August 2024, and then later cancelled. On the first day of the concert series, the band announced their song "Mastery" would be the theme song for the video game Tekken 8.

On November 12, 2024, it was announced that Miyavi had left the band.

== Members ==
=== Current ===
- Yoshiki – drums, piano, leader
- Hyde – lead vocals
- Sugizo – guitars, bass, violin, vocals

=== Former ===
- Miyavi – guitars, bass, vocals

== Discography ==
=== Singles ===
Title	Year	Peaks		Album
Title	Year	JPN Dig.	JPN Down.	Album
"The Last Rockstars (Paris Mix)"	2022	4	4	Non-album single
"Psycho Love"	2023	8	8	Non-album single
