= Hi no Hikari Sae Todokanai Kono Basho De =

- Regular edition cover

Single by Miyavi

from the album This Iz The Japanese Kabuki Rock
- Released: January 16, 2008
- Recorded: Dog House Studio
- Genre: Rock/pop
- Length: 13:41
- Label: PS Company/Universal
- Songwriter(s): Miyavi
- Producer(s): Miyavi, Kei Ishizaka

Miyavi singles chronology
"Subarashikikana, Kono Sekai" (2007)	"Hi no Hikari Sae Todokanai Kono Basho De" (2008)	"Survive" (2010)

Alternative cover
- Limited edition cover

"Hi no Hikari Sae Todokanai Kono Basho De" (陽の光さえ届かないこの場所で) is a single released by Miyavi on January 16, 2008. The title track features fellow S.K.I.N. member, Sugizo, as a guest guitarist. The single contains three tracks on the regular edition, while the special edition has only the first two tracks, although the limited editions includes a bonus DVD with the music video and making-of footage. It charted 10th on Oricon and 11th on Billboard Japan.

== Track listing ==
All music is composed by Miyavi.

Disc one (CD)
No.	Title	Lyrics	Length
1.	"Hi no Hikari Sae Todokanai Kono Basho De" (陽の光さえ届かないこの場所で)	Miyavi	5:31
2.	"My Name Iz Oresama.com" (My Name Iz 俺様.com)	Miyavi, Tyko	2:42
3.	"Hi no Hikari Sae Todokanai Kono Basho De (Instrumental)" (陽の光さえ届かないこの場所で)		5:29

Disc two (DVD, limited edition only)
No.	Title	Length
1.	"Hi no Hikari Sae Todokanai Kono Basho De" (陽の光さえ届かないこの場所で)
2.	"Making-of footage"

== Personnel ==
- Miyavi – vocals and lyrics, acoustic and electric guitar, tambourine, gigpig, producer
- Sugizo – electric guitar (Track 1 & 3) (special guest)
- Tyko – MC, beatbox, rapping
- DJ 1, 2 – turntable
- Masahide Sakuma – bass guitar
- Soul Toul – drums
- Tsuyoshi Inoue – Music video director (DVD track 1)
- Ryo Nagai – director (DVD track 2)
- Kavki Boiz – music video cast and performers
- Masahide Sakuma – producer
- Tomomi Ozaki – executive producer
- Atsushi Kitamura – executive producer
- Kei Ishizaka – general producer
- Noriyuki Kisou – recording engineer, mixing engineer
- Ue Nastasi – mastering engineer
