= Azn Pride -This Iz the Japanese Kabuki Rock- =

Azn Pride -This Iz The Japanese Kabuki Rock-
- Taiwanese cover

Greatest hits album by Miyavi
- Released: June 27, 2008
- Recorded: Dog House Studio; Hitokuchi-Zaka Studios; Zak Studio; Aladdin Lounge; Deji Toga; Heart Beat Recording Studio
- Genre: Rock, pop
- Length: 58:02
- Label: Universal Music Taiwan(); Universal Music Korea (8808678 53083 4); Universal Music Japan(UPCH-9433); PS Company
- Producer: Miyavi

Miyavi chronology
This Iz the Japanese Kabuki Rock (2008)	Azn Pride -This Iz The Japanese Kabuki Rock- (2008)	Room No. 382 (2008)

Azn Pride -This Iz the Japanese Kabuki Rock- is a greatest hits album released by Miyavi on 27 June 2008 for Taiwan and Korea and in Japan on 27 August 2008. The album covers Miyavi's career following his first major label single, "Rock no Gyakushuu/21sekikei Koushinkyoku". The album contains two original tracks, "As U R -Kimi wa Kimi no Mama de-" and "Wake Up Honey". It ranked 44th on Oricon and 54th on Billboard Japan.

The Japanese version of the album includes a second CD with the PV for "Tsurezure Naru Hibi Naredo" and a tour documentary covering the US and South American circuit of the "This Iz the Japanese Kabuki Rock Tour 2008".

== Track listing ==
All lyrics are written by Miyavi except 3, 4, 10, 11 (Miyavi and Tyko); all music is composed by Miyavi.

No.	Title	Length
1.	"Rock no Gyakushuu -Superstar no Jouken-" (ロックの逆襲–スーパースターの条件)
2.	"Kabuki Danshi -Kavki Boiz-" (歌舞伎男子)
3.	"2 Be Wiz U"
4.	"Boom-Hah-Boom-Hah-Hah"
5.	"As U R -Kimi wa Kimi no Mama de-" (As U R -君は君のままで-)
6.	"Wake Up Honey"
7.	"Kimi ni Negai wo" (君に願いを)
8.	"Itoshii Hito (Beta de Suman)" (愛しい人(ベタですまん))
9.	"Hi no Hikari Sae Todokanai Kono Basho de" (陽の光さえ届かないこの場所で feat. Sugizo)
10.	"Sakihokoru Hana You ni -Neo Visualizm-" (咲き誇る華の様に-Neo Visualizm-)
11.	"Subarashikikana, Kono Sekai -What a Wonderful World-" (素晴らしきかな、この世界-WHAT A WONDERFUL WORLD-)
12.	"Tsurezure Naru Hibi Naredo" (徒然なる日々なれど)
13.	"Thanx Givin' Day"
