= Fan's Best =

Fan′s Best

Compilation album by Miyavi
- Released: March 24, 2010
- Genre: Pop, electronic, rock
- Label: Universal

Miyavi chronology
| Victory Road to the King of Neo Visual Rock (2009) | Fan′s Best (2010) | What's My Name? (2010) |

Fan′s Best is a compilation album by Miyavi released on March 24, 2010. It contains 10 songs selected by fans and 5 bonus tracks selected by the artist. It charted 212th on Oricon.

== Track listing ==
| No. | Title | Length |
|---|---|---|
| 1. | "Girls, be ambitious" |
| 2. | "Sakihokoruhananoyouni -Neo Visyualism" (咲き誇る華の様に-Neo Visualizm-) |
| 3. | "Subarashikikana, Konosekai -What a Wonderful World-" (素晴らしきかな、この世界-WHAT A WONDERFUL WORLD-) |
| 4. | "Hinohikarisae Todokanaikonobasyode feat. Sugizo" (陽の光さえ届かないこの場所で feat.SUGIZO) |
| 5. | "Selfish love--Aishitekure, Aishiteru Kara-" (Selfish love-愛してくれ、愛してるから-) |
| 6. | "Freedom Fighters -Icecream Motta Hadashi no Megami to, Kikan Juu Motta Hadaka no Ousama-" (Freedom Fighters-アイスクリーム持った裸足の女神と、機関銃持った裸の王様-) |
| 7. | "Dear My Friend -Tegami wo Kaku Yo-" (Dear my friend-手紙を書くよ-) |
| 8. | "Itoshii Hito (Beta de Suman)-solo-" (愛しい人(ベタですまん。)～独奏～) |
| 9. | "Mamagoto (a.k.a. Erase and Delete)-JAM Session ver.-" (ママゴト(ex:消去と削除)～独奏 JAMセッションver.～) |
| 10. | "Kimi ni Negai Wo" (君に願いを) |
| 11. | "Pop Is Dead" (bonus track, live) |
| 12. | "How to Love" (bonus track, live) |
| 13. | "Kabuki Danshii" (歌舞伎男子-KAVKI BOIZ-; bonus track, live) |
| 14. | "Jibun kakumei-2007-" (自分革命-2007-; bonus track, live) |
| 15. | "Jingle Bell" (ジングルベル(仮); bonus track, live) |
