= Oresama =

Oresama - おれさま
- Oresama - おれさま
- Directed by: Marumo
- Written by: Dynamite Tommy
- Produced by: Suzuki Hiromitsu; Suzuki Kousuke; Shimada Ryouko; Miyada Sankiyo
- Starring: Miyavi; Hassei Takano; Matsushima Ryouta
- Music by: Miyavi; Endou Kouji
- Distributed by: Gaga Communications Inc.
- Release date: February 25, 2004
- Running time: 66 minutes
- Country: Japan
- Language: Japanese

Oresama (おれさま, lit. "my esteemed self") is a 2004 Japanese film. The film revolves around the protagonist of the story, Japanese rock musician Miyavi, portraying himself and his adventures when he goes back 20 years in time.

== Plot ==
The film starts with Miyavi leaving to see family back in his hometown in Osaka.

After an initial run into a few fans, on the way, he falls asleep in his car, following which, he wakes up walking on a railway track. Experiencing a series of bizarre events with the locals, he soon realizes that he is in the year 1984. Upon realizing which, he goes to his house but as he's not sure how to face his family & their reaction to him "coming from the future," he runs away even after ringing the door bell. Contemplating what to do now, he meets Shinni (Hassei Takano) in an alley, posting an advertisement about wanting to make a band. He convinces Shinni about his obvious good looks & being born to be a rock star. He also tells him that he could play the guitar & sing in the band. Convinced, Shinni asks for them to go to a recording studio. However, Miyavi advises against it. They leave for Shinni's home, whereupon witnessing Miyavi's remarkable guitar skills, Shinni accepts his proposal & agrees on letting him stay at his house.

Eventually, Miyavi meets a young boy (Matsushima Ryouta), who turns out to be his younger self.

== Cast and crew ==
=== Cast ===
- Miyavi as himself
- Hassei Takano as Shinni
- Matsushima Ryouta as the younger Miyavi
- Hamasama Akane as Shinni's friend
- Kubata Shouta as Shinni's friend
- Ogushi Erika as Shinni's friend

=== Crew ===
- Line producer - Kousuke Suzuki
- Planning - Keisuke Gotou, Hiroshi Fujimori
- Supervision - Hiroyuki Kondou
- Cameraman - Yuki Kimaya
- Editing - Hidaka Tokio
- Publicity - Ken Shouji
- Hair/make-up - Naomi Tooyama
- Clothing - Mikiko Mizuno
- Photography - S. Endou Mitsuhiro, Mikio Yuka
- Live lights - Shinichi Ueda
- Light Chief - Seiji Iwashita, Hirosuke Tongashi
- Audio - Hiroshi Miyada
- Choreography - Waku Hatayama
- Collaboration - Dynamite Tommy
- Film - Atom-X

== DVD releases ==
On February 25, 2004, Oresama was released on DVD in Japan by Free-Will with no subtitles and encoded for region 2 and retails at JPY¥4935 (approx. US$50.12).

On April 27, 2010, it was released on DVD in the United States by Discotek Media with English subtitles and encoded for region 1, at US$24.95 MSRP.
