= Dué le Quartz =

Japanese visual kei rock band

Due'le quartz
- Origin: Japan
- Genre: Alternative rock
- Years active: 1998–2002
- Label: PS Company
- Spinoffs: Figure
- Past members: Sakito; Miyabi; Kikasa; Kazuki; Ken

Due'le quartz (デュールクォーツ, Dyūru Kuōtsu) was a Japanese visual kei rock band that formed in December 1998 and signed to PS Company, a sub-division of Free-Will. The band opened a fanclub on August 1, 2000 known as "Baby Merry". After releasing a few albums, several singles and a greatest hits compilation, the group disbanded in 2002. Vocalist Sakito and bassist Kikasa later reunited to form the band Figure: (typeset as 【FIGURe:】) (with drummer Kazuki occasionally providing session work) and guitarist Miyabi changed his name to "Miyavi" and started a solo career.

== Biography ==
In December 1998, Sakito and Ken formed Due'le quartz and played their first live on February 14, 1999. They recruited bassist Kikasa somewhere in between, officially adding Kazuki to the mix on March 22 of that year.

Ken left the band in May 1999 due to musical differences, leaving the guitarist gap to be filled by Miyabi on June 29, 1999 and complete the band's final lineup.

They made it big quickly, landing their first one-man live on August 21, 2000 at Shibuya on Air West. Their first full one-man tour kicked off on May 16, 2001, and their second began on December 4, 2001.

The band landed the feature spot in the indie publication, Expect Rush I (January 2001) and Expect Rush II (March 2002).

After a 3-year run, Kikasa announced his withdrawal, which led to complete disbandment in 2002. They played their last live concert on September 22, 2002 at Akasaka Blitz.

== Members ==
- Sakito – vocals
- Miyavi – guitar, backing vocals
- Kikasa (キカサ) – bass
- Kazuki – drums

Former members

- Ken – guitar

== Discography ==
Demo tapes

- "Ame to Muchi wo..." (アメと鞭を..., July 19, 2000）)
- "Rob Song" (May 18, 2001)

Albums

- Mikansei no Jekyll to Hyde (未完成のジキルとハイド; , November 21, 1999)
- Jisatsu Ganbou (自殺願望, May 28, 2000)
- Rodeo (ロデオ, May 12, 2002)
- Best Album (August 14, 2002, Re-released on November 23, 2005 by King Records)

Singles

- "Dear...from XXX (disc 1)" (January 24, 2001)
- "Dear...from XXX (disc 2)" (January 24, 2001)
- "Bitter" (February 14, 2001)
- "Re:plica" (August 1, 2001)
- "Tribal Arivall Warning!!" (August 16, 2001)
- "Last Title" (September 4, 2002)

Compilations

- Matina Prelude (April 26, 2000, Free-Will)
  - (with the song "Kikai Shikake no Butoukai" (機械仕掛けの舞踏会))

Videos

- Jisatsu Ganbou (自殺願望, July 10, 2000)
- Milk (white) (February 14, 2001, VHS)
- Milk (black) (February 14, 2001, VHS)
- History 1999-2001 (January 7, 2002, VHS)
- Braintine (January 9, 2002, VHS)
- 「6419461049162791」-69 (January 9, 2002, VHS)
- Tour「アメと鞭を...」Final2002.01.07 ( July 3, 2002, VHS)
- Video Clips (July 3, 2002, VHS)
- 1st Oneman Live 2000.8.21 at Shibuya on Air West (TOUR 「合法ドラッグ」 at 渋谷ON AIR WEST, 2003, VHS)
