= Fire Bird (album) =

Studio album by Miyavi
- Released: 31 August 2016
- Genre: Rock
- Label: Virgin Music
- Producers: Miyavi, Lenny Skolnik

Miyavi chronology
The Others (2015)	Fire Bird (2016)	Samurai Sessions, Vol. 2 (2017)

Fire Bird is the tenth studio album by Japanese musician Miyavi. It was released on 31 August 2016 in Japan. It charted 11th on Oricon and on Billboard Japan.

== Release ==
The album was followed up by a nationwide tour MIYAVI Japan Tour 2016 "NEW BEAT, NEW FUTURE", which included 10 stops. The last performance was held at Makuhari Messe, and was broadcast live on Abema TV, with more than 100,000 viewers watching.

== Track listing ==
No.	Title	Writer(s)	Length
1.	"Another World"	Lenny Skolnik, Tom Leonard, Miyavi	4:19
2.	"Fire Bird"	Jonny Litten, Seann Bowe, Miyavi, Jun	3:26
3.	"Dim It (ft. Rosie Bones)"	Lenny Skolnik, Rosie Bones, Miyavi	3:22
4.	"Raise Me Up"	Jonny Litten, Lenny Skolnik, Seann Bowe, Miyavi	3:58
5.	"You Know It's Love"	Doc Brittain, Lenny Skolnik, Nick Long, Miyavi	3:09
6.	"Afraid To Be Cool"	Ilan Kidron, Lenny Skolnik, Miyavi	3:34
7.	"She Don't Know How To Dance"	Adam Kapit, Ilan Kidron, Lenny Skolnik, Mereki Beach, Miyavi, Jun	2:47
8.	"Steal The Sun"	Austin Massirman, Bobo, Lenny Skolnik, Tony Rodini, Miyavi	4:10
9.	"Long Nights"	Doc Brittain, Ilan Kidron, Lenny Skolnik, Ras, Tyko, Miyavi	3:47
10.	"Hallelujah"	Austin Massirman, Lenny Skolnik, Tom Leonard, Tony Rodini, Miyavi, Jun	3:37
11.	"Epic Swing (bonus track)"		2:56

== Personnel ==
Credits are adapted from the album's liner notes.

- Miyavi - vocals (1–4, 6–10), guitar (all tracks), writer (all tracks)
- Austin Massirman - backing vocals (1–4, 6–10)
- Lenny Skolnik - backing vocals (1–4, 6–10)
- Tony Rodini - backing vocals (1, 2, 4, 6–10)
- Jonny Litten - keyboard (1–7, 10)
- Bobo - drums (1, 3, 4, 6)
- Brendan Buckley - drums (2, 5, 7, 10)
- Rosie Bones - vocals (3)
- Meron Ryan - backing vocals (2, 4, 7, 8, 10)
- Seann Bowe - backing vocals (2, 4)
- Sidnie Tipton - backing vocals (2, 4, 7, 8, 10)
- Doc Brittain - backing vocals (9), drums (9)
- Nick Long - writer (5)
- Meron Ryan - backing vocals (2, 4, 7–10)
- Adam-Kapit - keyboards (7), vocals (7)
- Melody - backing vocals (8–10)
- Ras - backing vocals (9)
- Elizabeth Cunningham - backing vocals (9)
- Ilan Kidron - backing vocals (9)
- Hatsukazu Hatch Inagaki - engineer
- Shojiro Watanabe - additional engineer (1–4, 6)
- Carl Stoodt - assistant engineer
- Shaun Ezrol - assistant engineer
- Howie Weinberg - mastering engineer (all tracks)
- Chris Lord-Alge - mixing engineer (1–3, 5–10)
- Jon Kaplan - mixing engineer (4)
