= Victory Road to the King of Neo Visual Rock =

Compilation album by Miyavi
- Released: April 22, 2009
- Genre: Pop, electronic, rock
- Label: PS Company/Universal
- Producer: Miyavi

Miyavi chronology
Room No. 382 (2008)	Victory Road to the King of Neo Visual Rock (2009)	Fan's Best (2010)

Victory Road to the King of Neo Visual Rock is a compilation album by Miyavi released on April 22, 2009. It contains songs from all of Miyavi's singles from late 2004 to the release of the compilation. It charted 65th on Oricon and 91st on Billboard Japan.

== Track listing ==
No.	Title	Length
1.	"Rock no Gyakushuu -Super Star no Jouken-" (ロックの逆襲-スーパースターの条件-)
2.	"21 Sekikei Koushinkyoku" (21世紀型行進曲)
3.	"Freedom Fighters -Icecream wo Motta Hadashi no Megami to, Kikanjuu wo Motta Hadaka no Ousama-" (Freedom Fighters-アイスクリーム持った裸足の女神と、機関銃持った裸の王様-)
4.	"Kekkonshiki no Uta ~Kisetsu Hazure no Wedding March~ -with Band Ver.-" (結婚式の唄～季節はずれのウェディングマーチ～ -with BAND ver.-)
5.	"Are You Ready to Rock? ~Dokusou~" (Are you ready to ROCK? ～独奏～)
6.	"Señor Señora Señorita" (セニョール セニョーラ セニョリータ)
7.	"Gigpig Boogie" (Gigpigブギ)
8.	"Dear My Friend -Tegami wo Kaku Yo-" (Dear my friend -手紙を書くよ-)
9.	"Itoshii Hito (Beta de Suman) -2006 Ver.-" (愛しい人(ベタですまん。) -2006 ver.-)
10.	"Kimi ni Negai Wo" (君に願いを)
11.	"Sakihokoru Hana no You Ni" (咲き誇る華の様に)
12.	"Kabuki Danshii" (歌舞伎男子)
13.	"Subarashikikana, Kono Sekai -What A Wonderful World-" (素晴らしきかな、この世界)
14.	"2 Be Wiz U"
15.	"Hi no Hikari Sae Todokanai Kono Basho De" (陽の光さえ届かないこの場所で)
