= Miyavi (album) =

Studio album by Miyavi
- Released: June 19, 2013
- Length: 42:00
- Label: EMI Records Japan, Wrasse Records
- Producer: Miyavi, Yuksek, Matt Ward, Dean Gillard, The Lowbrows, Oscar Holter

Miyavi chronology
Samurai Sessions vol.1 (2012)	Miyavi (2013)	The Others (2015)

Singles from Miyavi
- 1. "Day 1" Released: July 11, 2012; 2. "Ahead Of The Light" Released: February 20, 2013; 3. "Horizon" Released: June 27, 2013

Miyavi is the eighth studio album by Japanese musician Miyavi. It was released on June 19, 2013 in Japan, and on March and April 2014 in Europe and United States. It charted as number eight on Oricon and Billboard Japan.

== Background ==
The album is Miyavi's eighth studio album, and second since founded his own company J-Glam. The album was released on June 19, 2013 in Japan by EMI Records Japan, and later in March and April 2014 in Europe and United States by Wrasse Records. It is also available worldwide as a digital release on iTunes Store. It includes some were previously released singles as well new ones, "Day 1", "Ahead Of The Light" and "Horizon". The music video of "Guard You" was also filmed. The song was written after the 2011 Tōhoku earthquake, as remembrance of precious people you need to leave behind to guard them. Its video features photos from "Under The Same Sky" project, with scenes of sky and hands by Miyavi's fans.

The limited edition in CD/DVD format, features a bonus DVD with exclusive live footage of "Ahead Of The Light" tour in 2013, and documentary about making the album.

In 2014, Miyavi went on his fourth world tour "Slap the World", which started on February 22 in Malaysia, continued throughout Europe followed by the European release of the latest studio album, and will visit Mexico City and Los Angeles with United States release of the album, before returning to Japan for his longest nationwide tour so far.

== Release ==
When the album was released, it peaked at number eight on the Oricon and Billboard Japan charts in Japan. It is his second album in top ten, and best selling so far. The singles "Day 1", "Ahead Of The Light" and "Horizon" peaked on Japan Hot 100 at number sixty-six, twenty-one and forty-nine. They also charted on Hot 100 Airplay, as number sixty-three, twenty-one, and thirty-six. "Horizon" also charted as thirty-nine on Adult Contemporary list.

In 2013, Miyavi and Yuksek received the Best Collaboration award for "Day 1" at the MTV Video Music Awards Japan, and in 2014 the music video of "Horizon" was nominated for the Best Male Video category.

== Track listing ==
All tracks are written by Miyavi and Dan Priddy.

CD
No.	Title	Length
1.	"Justice"	3:52
2.	"Horizon"	4:07
3.	"Chase It"	3:25
4.	"Secret"	2:53
5.	"Cry Like This"	4:09
6.	"Guard You"	5:27
7.	"No One Knows My Name (Slap It)"	4:24
8.	"Hell No"	2:13
9.	"Ahead Of The Light"	4:27
10.	"Day 1 (Album version)"	4:16
11.	"Free World"	3:14

== Recording personnel ==
- Vocals, Guitar: Miyavi
- Drums: Bobo
- Producer: Miyavi, Dean Gillard (#1–4, and #6–8), The Lowbrows (#1–9, #11), Matt Ward (#1–4, #6–8), Oscar Holter (#11), Yuksek (#5, #10), Dan Priddy (Backing Vocals)
- Mixing engineer: Dean Gillard, Matt Ward, Oscar Holter, Seiji Sekine, Yuksek, Yuki Tanaka (#10)
- Mastering engineer: Stuart Hawkes
- Programmer, editor, keyboards, synthesizer: Dean Gillard, Matt Ward, The Lowbrows
- Recording engineer: Dan Priddy, Joe Standen, Matt Ward, Seiji Sekine
- Art Direction: Yoshiro Nishi
