= Subarashikikana, Kono Sekai =

- Regular edition cover

Single by Miyavi

from the album This Iz The Japanese Kabuki Rock
- Released: November 14, 2007
- Recorded: 2007
- Genre: Rock, pop, hip hop
- Length: 11:44 (Disc one); 8:43 (Disc two)
- Label: PS Company
- Songwriter(s): Miyavi and Tyko
- Producer(s): Miyavi, Masahide Sakuma

Miyavi singles chronology
"Sakihokoru Hana no You Ni/Kabuki Boiz" (2007)	"Subarashikikana, Kono Sekai" (2007)	"'Hi no Hikari Sae Todokanai Kono Basho De'" (2008)

Alternative art
- Limited edition "Type A" cover

Alternative cover
- Limited Edition "Type B" cover

"Subarashikikana, Kono Sekai -What A Wonderful World-" is a single released by Miyavi on November 14, 2007. The single contains three tracks on the regular edition, while the two limited editions will contain only two tracks, omitting "Mata Yume de Aimashou". The limited editions include a bonus DVD or photo book. It charted 13th on Oricon.

== Track listing ==
All lyrics are written by Miyavi and Tyko; all music is composed by Miyavi

Disc one
No.	Title	Length
1.	"Subarashikikana, Kono Sekai -What A Wonderful World-" (素晴らしきかな、この世界)	4:12
2.	"2 Be Wiz U"	4:02
3.	"Mata Yume de Aimashou" (また夢で逢いましょう)	3:30

Disc two (DVD, limited edition only)
No.	Title	Length
1.	"Subarashikikana, Kono Sekai -What A Wonderful World-" (素晴らしきかな、この世界)	4:23
2.	"2 Be Wiz U"	4:20

== Personnel ==
- Miyavi – vocals, guitar, producer
- Tyko – MC, rapping
- Saro – tap dancing
- DJ 1, 2 – turntable
- Masahide Sakuma – bass guitar, producer
- Soul Toul – drums
- Tom Durack – mastering
- Noriyuki Kisou – recording, mixing
