= Galyuu =

Studio album by Miyavi
- Released: December 2, 2003
- Genre: Rock, pop, heavy metal
- Length: 42:12
- Label: PS Company

Miyavi chronology
| Gagaku (2002) | Galyuu (2003) | Miyavizm (2005) |

Galyuu (雅流) is the second studio album by Miyavi. It was released on December 2, 2003.

== Track listing ==
All tracks are written by Miyavi

| No. | Title | Length |
|---|---|---|
| 1. | "Intro" | 0:14 |
| 2. | "Ippiki Ookami Ron" (一匹狼論) | 3:22 |
| 3. | "Eccentric Otona Yamai ~Kuso Gaki Ver." (エキセントリック大人病～くそ餓鬼ver.) | 0:48 |
| 4. | "Eccentric Otona Yamai" (エキセントリック大人病) | 3:16 |
| 5. | "Aa, Kanashiki kana Yatoware no Mi no Blues" (嗚呼、悲しきかな 雇われの身のブルース) | 6:11 |
| 6. | "Coo Quack Cluck -Ku.Ku.Ru- ~ Oresama Ver." (Coo quack cluck-ク・ク・ル-～おれさまver.) | 4:17 |
| 7. | "Interlude" | 0:09 |
| 8. | "Joushou Kaidou" (常勝街道) | 4:25 |
| 9. | "Shikenkan Baby" (試験管ベイビー) | 3:14 |
| 10. | "Ossan Ossan Ore Nanbo" (おっさんおっさん俺なんぼ) | 2:57 |
| 11. | "Ashita, Tenki ni Naare ~Doshaburi Ver." (あしタ、天気ニなぁレ。～どしゃ降りver.) | 0:26 |
| 12. | "Ashita, Tenki ni Naare" (あしタ、天気ニなぁレ。) | 3:46 |
| 13. | "Tom and Jerry" (トメとジュリー) | 4:13 |
| 14. | "Requiem" ((bonus track)) | 5:33 |
