= Skin (Japanese band) =

US-based Japanese visual kei rock band

S.K.I.N.
- Origin: Long Beach, California, United States
- Genres: Rock
- Years active: 2007
- Members: Yoshiki; Gackt; Sugizo; Miyavi

Skin (stylized as S.K.I.N. (Note: On the question "Which is correct, SKIN or S.K.I.N.?" in 2007 it was replied to be "S.K.I.N." hence possibly having a different pronunciation than simple "Skin", but also there's no information what does S.K.I.N. stand for. At the time there was no official website or social media account as well.)) is a United States–based Japanese visual kei rock supergroup founded by Japanese musicians Yoshiki, Gackt, Sugizo and Miyavi in 2007. The group's debut performance was on June 29, 2007, at Long Beach Arena, California. Although they had announced more activities, including a live tour and releasing an album, no new activities have occurred.

== History ==
=== Conception and announcement ===
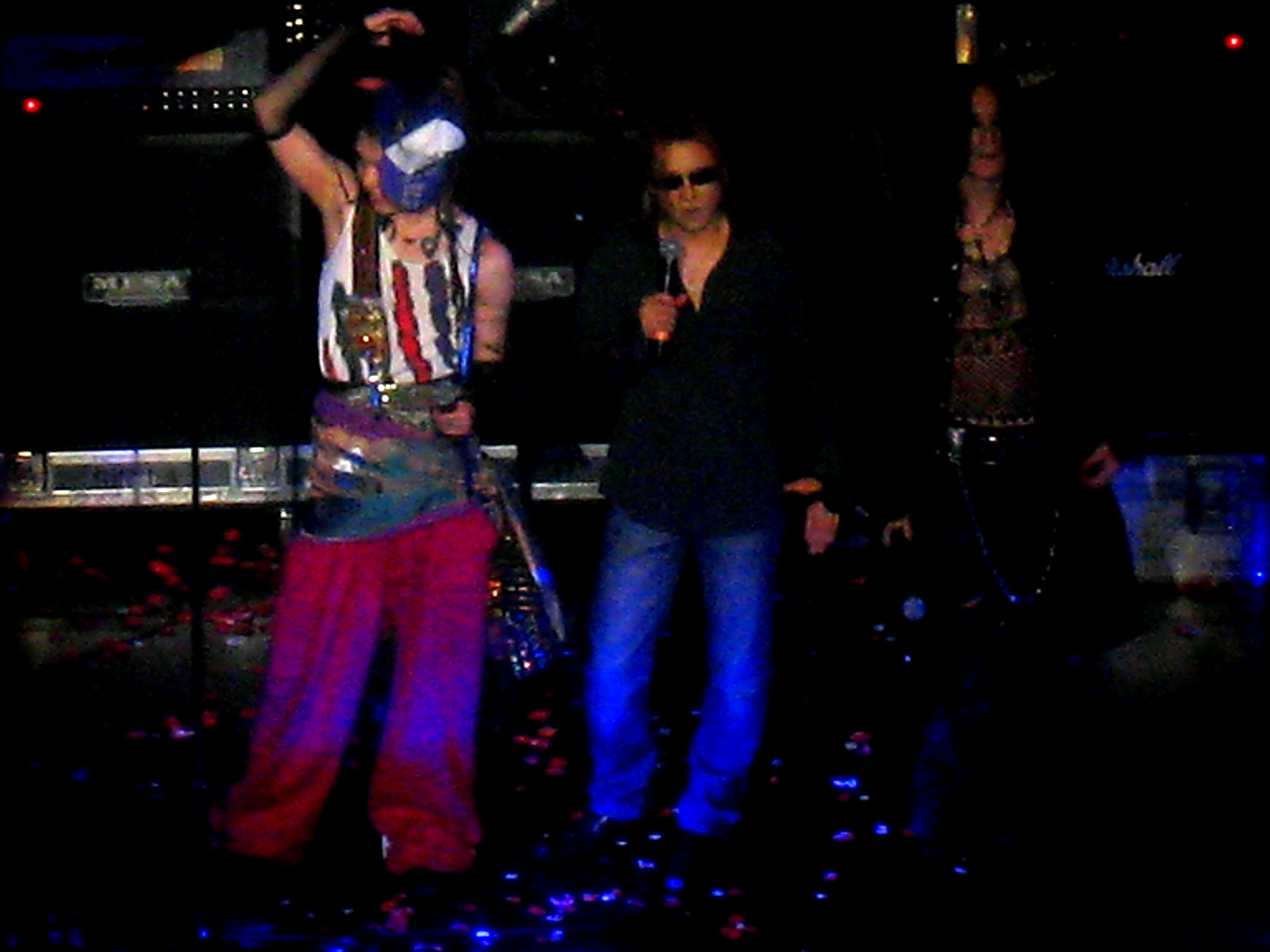
Miyavi, Yoshiki and Sugizo at JRock Revolution in 2007.

The origin of the band dates back to when Yoshiki invited Gackt to his Los Angeles mansion in 2002, where they decided to produce some music together. The band was publicly announced in July 2006 at an Otakon conference where Yoshiki as a guest said, he would be starting a band with Gackt. He announced how the band would be composed of five members, and they are going to produce a recording with a live tour in 2007. In December of the same year, it was announced that Sugizo would be the third member and the first guitarist of the group. And then at the first "JRock Revolution Festival" on May 25, 2007, organized by Yoshiki, he officially announced that Miyavi would be the fourth member and second guitarist, and that Skin would be having its debut performance on June 29, 2007, at the anime expo in Long Beach.

In April 2007, Yoshiki confirmed that the group was planning to release an album and that rough recordings of seven or eight songs were made in March 2007. Yoshiki at the time struggled with composing and writing lyrics, managing to finish for the concert only one song.

With the well known members the act is considered a supergroup, causing their concert to be called the "Japanese rock concert of the century". Both Gackt and Yoshiki said that they want to be the first Asian band to conquer the world charts, beginning with America. Their aim reportedly was to shock the declining music industry and creating a new era of music and rock 'n' roll.

=== Debut concert ===
On June 12, premiere Skin concert tickets started to be released via the internet. However, massive interest led to flooding of the servers, causing them to crash, and in a few hours ticket reservations were temporarily stopped.

On Thursday night of June 28, Skin performed for the first time at Long Beach Arena, supported on bass by Ju-ken, at the time a member of Gackt's live band. The concert began almost two and a half hours late, for unknown reasons. They performed around five songs, of which four were "Gei-Sha", "Killing you softly", "Beneath The Skin", "Violets", and most lyrics were in English and Japanese. During the intermediate of the performance of "Beneath The Skin", Gackt and Yoshiki both played piano, Sugizo was on violin and Miyavi played the traditional Japanese shamisen. Gackt's singing style was more aggressive than in his solo career. At the end, Gackt announced that they would meet again. Reportedly, the concert was officially video recorded.

=== Since 2007 ===
Since their debut performance, Skin has been inactive. All activity was suddenly stopped without any information and the future of the band still remains unclear.

According to Yoshiki, after the show the members were talking about the next step for the band. In a 2008 interview, Sugizo was asked about the band. He had said that at the meeting was concluded they would definitely continue to work together, but are all too busy to get together at the same time and place, and added "maybe from next year summer". After nothing happened the following year, in a 2009 interview he stated " I don't know... I think it will continue". In 2011 said that he does not want to give up the project, and that they should restart it. During a press conference in June 2010, Miyavi said he was honored being included in the group, and revealed that he would like to become active with Skin in the near future. In November 2011, he tweeted that he met with Yoshiki, and they talked about the band.

Meanwhile, in 2007 Toshi from X Japan called Yoshiki and they talked for the first time in ten years and about possible X Japan reunion. Yoshiki was not sure what to do next, decided to reunite X Japan for at least one time, but the reaction was overwhelming and when Sugizo joined X Japan in 2009 the band's activity continued. In 2010 interviews, Yoshiki said as he is currently working with X Japan and his solo project Violet UK, as well other members on theirs, it will be after them and it's not in his immediate thoughts. In a 2014 interview Yoshiki stated they're still talking about it and "there's definitely a possibility we will be together, but at this point, we don't have any specific plan", how they will "just do it when the timing is right", but also elaborating how Skin's inactivity "it's a little more like my fault, because I was not planning on doing X Japan at that time, then I started doing X Japan". The song "Beneath The Skin", which Sugizo composed and Yoshiki wrote the lyrics for the Skin, was covered and played by X Japan in 2014. On 23 May 2016, Yoshiki and Gackt had a joint special live broadcast on Niconico, where also discussed about Skin, with Gackt remembering how he started hating Yoshiki because Yoshiki did not show up for rehearsal prior the performance and were used only 2 hours out of a week for preparation. However, Gackt understood the pressure Yoshiki was facing at the time and how the supergroup became a "stepping stone" in a good way for X Japan's reunion, in the end, Gackt said that would gladly and ambitiously restart Skin if Yoshiki called and concluded that Skin is the only band capable conquering the world.

In November 2022, Yoshiki, Miyavi, and Sugizo announced their collaboration in a new supergroup, The Last Rockstars, with Hyde as a singer. The supergroup also covered the song "Beneath The Skin", with Yoshiki considering it as a "prototype" of the new supergroup.

== Members ==
- Yoshiki – drums, piano
- Gackt – vocals, piano
- Sugizo – guitar, violin
- Miyavi – guitar, shamisen

Session member

- Ju-ken – bass
