= What's My Name? (Miyavi album) =

Studio album by Miyavi
- Released: October 13, 2010
- Genre: Rock, pop
- Length: 58:11
- Label: EMI Records Japan
- Producer: Miyavi

Miyavi chronology
Fan's Best (2010)	What's My Name? (2010)	Live in London 2011 (2011)

What's My Name? is the seventh studio album by Japanese musician Miyavi. It was released on October 13, 2010, in Japan, featuring collaborations with various artists. The album charted as number twenty-six on Oricon and thirty-three on Billboard Japan.

== Background ==
What's My Name? is Miyavi's seventh studio album, and his first since he founded his own company J-Glam in 2009. It was released on October 13, 2010, in Japan by EMI Records Japan, in regular and limited CD/DVD edition, featuring official music videos. It is also available worldwide as a digital release on iTunes Store.

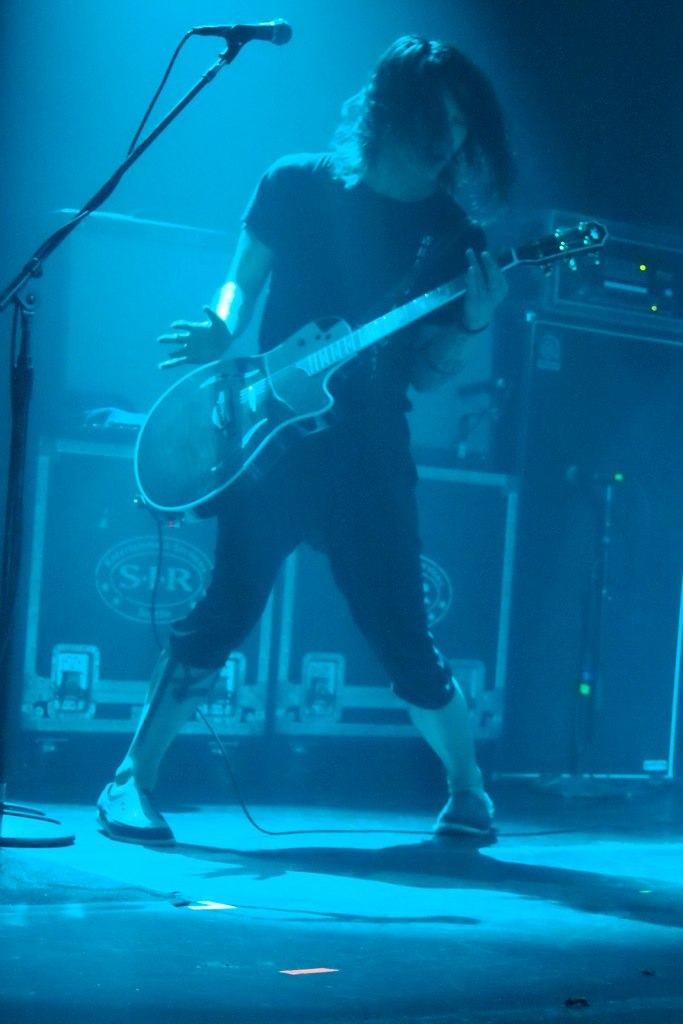
Miyavi performing in New York, 2011.

In 2009, Miyavi launched his own company J-Glam on April 8. On June 1, "Super Hero," a new song, was released through his official Myspace. In September, his International Fanclub was opened. On September 19, Miyavi started his second worldwide tour Neo Tokyo Samurai Black 2009/2010, in Moscow, Russia. He held 17 concerts in Europe, visiting for the first time Austria, Hungary and Italy. The tour was immediately continued in South America, with concerts in Brazil, Argentina, Chile and Mexico, as well as a performance at Anime Matsuri, Texas in November. On December 31, he signed a new contract with EMI Music Japan.

In 2010, Miyavi released "Survive" as his first single with EMI via iTunes on March 10. The worldwide tour was continued on March 28, with the concert at Human Stage, Okinawa, and nationwide. In June and early July, Miyavi toured throughout the United States and Canada, as well as in Australia for the first time in October. On September 15, his eleventh major single "Torture" was released, followed by his fifth studio album What's My Name? on October 13. On November 6, he performed at the EMI Rocks 50th anniversary event at Saitama Super Arena.

In March 2011, a live album Live in London 2011 was released, and a new world tour, titled What's My Name? began, in Europe, with his first visit to Belgium. In April the tour continued in Japan, while in July Miyavi performed in France, and in September at the Mount Taishan MAO Rock Festival in China. On October 5, his twelfth major single "Strong" was released, in collaboration with Japanese rapper Kreva. It was followed by the North American leg of the tour. Miyavi performed in South America at the Maquinaria festival in Chile, and visited Venezuela, Peru and Colombia for the first time.

== Release ==
At its release, the album peaked at number twenty-six on the Oricon Charts and number thirty-three on the Billboard Japan charts in Japan. It stayed on the Oricon charts for three weeks.

The singles "Survive" and "Torture" didn't manage to peak on Japan Hot 100 and Hot 100 Airplay. "Torture" only managed to peak by sales at number thirty-six at Hot Singles Sales, while "What's My Name?" peaked at number seventy-five on Hot 100, at seventy on Hot 100 Airplay, and fifty-four on Hot Singles Sales.

== Track listing ==
All tracks are written by Miyavi.

CD
No.	Title	Length
1.	"What's My Name?"	3:27
2.	"Torture"	2:58
3.	"A-Ha"	4:24
4.	"Chillin' Chillin' Money Blue$"	3:01
5.	"I Love You, I Love You, I Love You, And I Hate You."	3:24
6.	"Moon"	3:42
7.	"Gravity"	5:59
8.	"Universe"	3:48
9.	"Unbreakable"	3:59
10.	"Shelter"	3:17
11.	"Super Hero (Album Ver.)"	4:58
12.	"Sutekina Mirai"	4:02
13.	"Futuristic Love"	4:52
14.	"Survive (Album Ver.)"	3:20
