= Live in London 2011 =

Live album by Miyavi
- Released: May 2, 2011
- Genre: Rock, Pop, Hip-hop
- Length: 1:47:53
- Label: EMI Music Global

Miyavi chronology
What's My Name? (2010)	Live in London 2011 (2011)	Samurai Sessions vol.1 (2012)

Live in London 2011 is a live album by Miyavi released on May 2, 2011. It was recorded on March 19, 2011 at the HMV Forum in London as part of the 'What's My Name?' world tour. The double disc album initially went on sale at subsequent shows as a rough mix from Abbey Road Live Studios.

== Track listing ==
All music is composed by Miyavi

Disc one
No.	Title	Length
1.	"What's My Name?"	5:06
2.	"Universe"	3:57
3.	"Survive"	4:12
4.	"Hell No"	3:05
5.	"Chase"	4:11
6.	"Chillin' Chillin' Money Blue$"	5:53
7.	"I Love You, I Love You, I Love You, And I Hate You"	6:42
8.	"Gravity"	6:07
9.	"Justice"	7:25
10.	"Shelter"	3:33

Disc two
No.	Title	Length
1.	"Moon"	7:26
2.	"We Love You"	8:09
3.	"Torture"	6:16
4.	"S.M.F.B"	3:18
5.	"Are You Ready To Rock?"	9:02
6.	"Futuristic Love"	14:40
7.	"What A Wonderful World"	4:30
8.	"Survive"	4:30
