= The Others (Miyavi album) =

Studio album by Miyavi
- Released: April 15, 2015
- Genre: Rock; funk
- Length: 36:56
- Label: Universal Music Group; Virgin Music
- Producer: Miyavi, Drew Ramsey, Shannon Sanders

Miyavi chronology
Miyavi (2013)	The Others (2015)	Fire Bird (2016)

The Others is the ninth studio album by Japanese musician Miyavi. It was released on April 15, 2015 in Japan. It charted at number 10 on the Oricon chart and number 9 on Billboard Japan.

== Background and release ==
The album was produced by Grammy Award winning Drew Ramsey and Shannon Sanders in Nashville. The song Alien Girl was dedicated to Angelina Jolie, while its title song, The Others was later released in a different version to support UNHCR. The album features Robert Harvey in Unite. For this album, Miyavi changed his electric guitar to a Telecaster, which resulted in an "edgier and more aggressive" sound. According to Miyavi, the concept of the album was about the acceptance of being different, something that was on his mind for a long time, as he often felt pressure to conform to societal norms, especially when he moved to the United States.

The album was followed by a two-part nationwide tour, a Europe tour (his fifth on the continent), and a concert in South Korea.

== Track listing ==
All tracks are written by Miyavi, Drew Ramsey, Shannon Sanders, Leo Imai; and Robert Harvey (track 8).

CD
No.	Title	Length
1.	"Cruel"	4:21
2.	"Into The Red"	2:46
3.	"Come Alive"	3:51
4.	"Alien Girl"	3:43
5.	"Let Go (2015 Version)"	2:24
6.	"Odyssey"	2:55
7.	"All The Way"	3:08
8.	"Unite (ft. Robert Harvey)"	3:28
9.	"The Others"	3:26
10.	"Calling"	4:07
11.	"Shangri-La"	2:47
