= Room No. 382 =

Remix album by Miyavi
- Released: December 24, 2008
- Genre: Electronica, electropop
- Length: 38:58
- Label: PS Company/Universal
- Producer: Miyavi

Miyavi chronology
Azn Pride (2008)	Room No. 382 (2008)	Victory Road to the King of Neo Visual Rock (2009)

Room No. 382 is a remix album by Miyavi released on December 24, 2008. The album contains songs varying from both his indie and major label career and are remixed by his former DJ TeddyLoid from his backup band the Kavki Boiz. It charted 127th on Oricon and 89th on Billboard Japan.

== Track listing ==
No.	Title	Length
1.	"Ippiki Ookami Ron" (一匹狼論)	3:28
2.	"2 be wiz U"	3:59
3.	"Jibun Kakumei" (自分革命)	4:09
4.	"Dear my friend"	3:17
5.	"Kimi ni Negai wo" (君に願いを)	4:18
6.	"Señor, Señora, Señorita" (セニョール セニョーラ セニョリータ)	4:09
7.	"Rock no Gyakushuu" (ロックの逆襲)	3:13
8.	"Joushou Gaidou" (常勝街道)	4:17
9.	"Girls, be ambitious"	4:25
10.	"Ashita, Genki ni Naare" (あしタ、元気ニなぁレ。)	3:45
