= This Iz the Japanese Kabuki Rock =

Studio album by Miyavi
- Released: March 19, 2008
- Recorded: Dog House Studio; Hitokuchi-Zaka Studios; Zak Studio; Aladdin Lounge; Deji Toga; Heart Beat Recording Studio
- Genre: Rock, pop, hip hop, electronic
- Length: 47:51
- Label: PS Company/Universal
- Producer: Miyavi

Miyavi chronology
| 7 Samurai Sessions (2007) | This Iz the Japanese Kabuki Rock (2008) | Azn Pride (2008) |

Singles from This Iz the Japanese Kabuki Rock
- 1. "Sakihokoru Hana no You Ni/Kabuki Boiz" Released: June 20, 2007; 2. "Subarashikikana, Kono Sekai" Released: November 14, 2007; 3. "Hi no Hikari sae Todokanai Kono Basho de" Released: January 16, 2008

Alternative cover
- Limited edition

This Iz the Japanese Kabuki Rock is the sixth studio album by Miyavi. It was released on March 19, 2008. A limited edition was released on SHM-CD, a supposedly high-quality CD format developed by Universal, and includes a DVD featuring music videos and documentary footage. The album is advertised as the "final stage" of Miyavi's recent "Neo Visualizm" theme, and features the artist's performance troupe, the Kavki Boiz, including an MC, various instrumentalists, and other artists. The album charted 25th on Oricon and 27th on Billboard Japan.

The documentary on the second disc features footage of the making-of the album. The film shows a month-by-month breakdown of each song being recorded in various studios.

A working title for "Jpn Pride" was "Azn Pride". Songs that did not make the album or underwent rewriting include "Morning Glory" and "Winding Road". The title of "Azn Pride" was later used for his greatest hits compilation for Korea and Taiwan, titled Azn Pride -This Iz the Japanese Kabuki Rock-.

== Track listing ==
All lyrics are written by Miyavi; all music is composed by Miyavi and Tyko except 7, 10, 11 (Miyavi)

Disc one (CD)
| No. | Title | Length |
|---|---|---|
| 1. | "Jpn Pride" | 5:13 |
| 2. | "21st Century Tokyo Blues" (21st Century 東京 Blues) | 4:16 |
| 3. | "Kabuki Danshi -Kavki Boiz-" (歌舞伎男子) | 4:11 |
| 4. | "Boom-Hah-Boom-Hah-Hah" | 4:19 |
| 5. | "Memories of Bushido (Instrumental)" | 1:06 |
| 6. | "Nowheregod" | 7:06 |
| 7. | "Hi no Hikari Sae Todokanai Kono Basho de" (陽の光さえ届かないこの場所で featuring Sugizo) | 5:30 |
| 8. | "Sakihokoru Hana no You Ni -Neo Visualizm-" (咲き誇る華の様に) | 4:35 |
| 9. | "Subarashikikana, Kono Sekai -What A Wonderful World-" (素晴らしきかな、この世界) | 4:10 |
| 10. | "Tsurezure Naru Hibi Naredo" (徒然なる日々なれど) | 4:32 |
| 11. | "Thanx Givin' Day" | 2:57 |

Disc two (DVD)
| No. | Title | Length |
|---|---|---|
| 1. | "Hi no Hikari Sae Todokanai Kono Basho de -Guitar Battle Mixx-" (陽の光さえ届かないこの場所で, music video, featuring Sugizo) |
| 2. | "This Iz the Torippanashi Tosatsu Video" (This Iz The 撮りっぱなし盗撮ビデオ) |
| 3. | "Hi no Uchidokoro Sae Miatranai Kono PV Documentary Eizo" (非の打ち所さえ見当たらないこのPVドキュメンタリー映像, making-of footage) |

== Personnel ==
- Miyavi – vocals, composer, lyricist, vocal percussion, acoustic guitar, electric guitar, electric sitar, Dobro guitar, shamisen, bells, tambourine, Gigpig
- Tyko – rapping (1, 2, 3, 4, 6, 7, 8, 9), khoomii (5), beatboxing (4)
- Hige-chang – bass guitar (1)
- Ryo Yamagata – drums (1, 3, 4, 6)
- DJ 1/2 – turntable (1, 2, 6, 7, 9, 10)
- Saro – tap dancing (1, 8, 9), djembe (6)
- Yuko Nakakita – percussion (1, 5, 6, 10)
- Isao Murakami – taiko (1)
- Masahide Sakuma – bass guitar (2, 6, 7, 8, 9, 10), keyboard (8, 10)
- Soul Toul – drums (2, 7, 8, 9, 10)
- Mitsuru Nasuno – bass guitar (3, 4)
- DJ Hanger – turntable (3, 8)
- Yoshinari Takegami – saxophone (3)
- M.C.A-T – programming (3)
- Sugizo – electric guitar (7)

Note: Other than for lyrics and music composition, the album's liner notes offer no credits for the eleventh track "Thanx Givin' Day".
