= Gagaku (album) =

Studio album by Miyavi
- Released: October 31, 2002
- Genre: Heavy metal, industrial
- Length: 35:07
- Label: PS Company

Miyavi chronology
Gagaku (2002)	Galyuu (2003)

Gagaku (雅楽) is the debut solo album by Miyavi. It was released on October 31, 2002.

== Track listing ==
All tracks are written by Miyavi

No.	Title	Length
1.	"Hatachi Kinenbi" (二十歳記念日)	3:06
2.	"Coin Lockers Baby" (コインロッカーズベイビー)	2:39
3.	"Kusare Gedou He" (腐れ外道へ。)	2:25
4.	"Night in Girl"	2:14
5.	"Girls, Be Ambitious"	4:26
6.	"Oresama Shikou" (オレ様思考)	2:03
7.	"Gariben Rock" (ガリ勉ロック)	3:56
8.	"Onpu no Tegami" (♪の手紙)	4:24
9.	"Shokubutsu Ningen M no Theme" (植物人間Ｍのテーマ)	4:02
10.	"Dear from... XXX" ((bonus track))	5:52
