= Samurai Sessions vol.1 =

EP by Miyavi
- Released: November 14, 2012
- Genre: Rock, pop, hip hop
- Length: 26:13
- Label: EMI Records Japan
- Producer: Miyavi

Miyavi chronology
Live in London 2011 (2011)	Samurai Sessions vol.1 (2012)	Miyavi (2013)

Singles from Samurai Sessions vol.1
- 1. "Strong" Released: October 5, 2011; 2. "Day 1" Released: July 11, 2012

Samurai Sessions vol.1 is an EP by Japanese musician Miyavi. It was released on November 14, 2012, in Japan, and featured collaboration with various artists. It charted as number twenty one on Oricon and seventeen on Billboard Japan.

== Background ==
This EP was released on November 14, 2012, in Japan by EMI Records Japan, in regular and limited CD/DVD format, featuring official music videos and those filmed in studio along featured artists. It is also available worldwide as a digital release on iTunes Store.

In October 2011, was released first album single, and Miyavi's twelfth major, "Strong". It was a collaboration with Japanese rapper Kreva. From then until the end of the year Miyavi went on North and South American legs of the What's My Name?, his third worldwide tour. In 2012, on February 19, Miyavi performed at the second EMI Rocks event in Saitama Super Arena. On June 29, he performed at the EHZ Festival in Helette, while on June 30, he was the only Asian representative at the Main Square Festival in Arras, France. On July 11, his thirteenth major single, "Day 1," was released in collaboration with the French electronic producer and DJ, Yuksek. On September 8, Miyavi performed at the 908 Festival, organized by Kreva, in Saitama Super Arena. In October two concerts were held in Indonesia. In November 14, when was released the album Samurai Sessions vol.1, Miyavi done many collaborations, from which songs were included in the album. The featured artists, besides Kreva and Yuksek, include breakbeat duo Hifana, rock singer Takeshi Hosomi from The Hiatus, jazz keyboardist H Zett M from Pe'z, shamisen artist Hiromitsu Agatsuma, flamenco guitarist Jin Oki, bassist and producer Seiji Kameda, and singer Miu Sakamoto.

== Release ==
When the album was released, it peaked at number twenty-one on the Oricon, and seventeen on Billboard Japan charts in Japan. It charted for twelve weeks on Oricon charts. The singles "Strong" and "Day 1", peaked on Japan Hot 100 at number fifteen, and sixty-six. They also charted on Hot 100 Airplay, as seventeen, and sixty-three. "Strong" also charted as twenty-one on Adult Contemporary list.

In 2013, Miyavi and Yuksek received the Best Collaboration award for "Day 1" at the MTV Video Music Awards Japan.

== Track listing ==
All tracks are written by Miyavi and featured artists.

CD
No.	Title	Length
1.	"Ganryu" (Miyavi vs Hifana)	1:26
2.	"Strong" (Miyavi vs Kreva)	3:18
3.	"Day 1" (Miyavi vs Yuksek)	3:19
4.	"Silent Anger" (Miyavi vs Takeshi Hosomi)	4:20
5.	"Pleasure!" (Miyavi vs H Zett M)	3:44
6.	"Ha Na Bi" (Miyavi vs Hiromitsu Agatsuma vs Jin Oki)	4:00
7.	"Inori wo" (祈りを) (Miyavi vs Seiji Kameda vs Miu Sakamoto)	6:06
