= 7 Samurai Sessions -We're Kavki Boiz- =

- Cover to the standard edition of the album

Compilation album by Miyavi
- Released: July 18, 2007
- Genres: Rock; experimental
- Label: PS Company/Universal

Miyavi chronology
Miyaviuta -Dokusou- (2006)	7 Samurai Sessions -We're Kavki Boiz- (2007)	This Iz The Japanese Kabuki Rock (2008)

Alternative cover
- Limited edition cover

7 Samurai Sessions -We're Kavki Boiz- is an album by Miyavi, released on July 18, 2007. It contains re-arrangements of previously published songs. It charted 44th on Oricon.

== Track listing ==
No.	Title	Length
1.	"Selfish Love -Aishitekure, Aishiteru Kara-" (Selfish love –愛してくれ、愛してるから–)	6:49
2.	"Rock 'N' Roll Is not Dead" (邦題：ロックンロールは眠らない)	4:27
3.	"Ame ni Utaeba -Pichi Pichi Chapu Chapu Ran Ran Blues-" (雨に唄えば ～ピチピチチャプチャプランランブルース～)	3:46
4.	"Girls, Be Ambitious"	3:28
5.	"Shouri no V-Rock!!" (勝利のV-ROCK!!)	4:14
6.	"Ashita, Genki ni Naare" (あしタ、元気ニなぁレ)	4:21
7.	"Kimi ni Negai Wo" (君に願いを)	5:32
