= Miyaviuta -Dokusou- =

Studio album by Miyavi
- Released: September 13, 2006
- Genre: Pop, rock
- Length: 39:35
- Label: PS Company/Universal

Miyavi chronology
MYV Pops (2006)	Miyaviuta -Dokusou- (2006)	7 Samurai Sessions (2007)

Miyaviuta -Dokusou- (雅-みやびうた-歌～独奏～) is the fifth studio album by Miyavi. It was released on September 13, 2006. It was produced by Hideki Tsutsumi and reached number 25 on the weekly Oricon Style chart.

== Track listing ==
All tracks are written by Miyavi

No.	Title	Length
1.	"Jikoai, Jigajisan, Jiishiki Kajou (Instrumental)" (自己愛、自画自賛、自意識過剰 (Instrumental))	1:00
2.	"Selfish Love -Aishitekure, Aishiteru Kara-" (Selfish love –愛してくれ、愛してるから–)	3:04
3.	"Please, Please, Please" (プリーズ、プリーズ、プリーズ。)	3:10
4.	"Dear My Love..."	4:00
5.	"Boku wa Shitteru" (僕は知ってる。)	4:23
6.	"How to Love"	2:51
7.	"Baka na Hito" (バカな人)	4:22
8.	"Kimi ni Funky Monkey Vibration" (君にファンキーモンキーバイヴレーション)	2:52
9.	"We Love You -Sekai wa Kimi wo Aishiteru-" (We love you ～世界は君を愛してる～)	4:52
10.	""Aishiteru" Kara Hajime You" ("愛してる"からはじめよう)	3:12
11.	"Jiko Shijou Shugisha no Nare no Hate (Instrumental)" (自己至上主義者の成れの果て (Instrumental))	2:01
12.	"Are You Ready to Love?"	3:47
