= Miyavizm =

Studio album by Miyavi
- Released: June 1, 2005
- Genre: Rock, pop, heavy metal
- Length: 40:40
- Label: PS Company/Universal
- Producer: Miyavi

Miyavi chronology
| Galyuu (2003) | Miyavizm (2005) | MYV Pops (2006) |

Miyavizm (雅主義, Miyabishugi) is the third studio album by Miyavi. It was released on June 1, 2005. Its limited edition comes with the song "Shakespeare ni Sasagu" (シェイクスピアに捧ぐ) instead of tracks eleven and twelve. It charted 10th on Oricon.

== Track listing ==
All tracks are written by Miyavi

| No. | Title | Length |
|---|---|---|
| 1. | "Sukkyanen Myv ~Myv Man Koshiki Oenka~ (Zenpen)" (好っきゃねんMYV～MYVマン公式応援歌～) | 2:25 |
| 2. | "Koi wa Push Phone" (恋はプッシュホン♪) | 3:59 |
| 3. | "Viva Viva Bebop ~Jinsei, Nakiwarai~" (ビバ★ビバ★ビバップ～人生,泣き笑い～) | 4:13 |
| 4. | "Pop 'n Roll Koshien (Baseball)" (ポップンロール甲子園(ベースボール)) | 4:17 |
| 5. | "Aho Matsuri" (阿呆祭-アホまつり-) | 3:56 |
| 6. | "Sai sai sainara Bye Bye Bye" (さいさいさいならByebyebye, featuring Psy) | 3:07 |
| 7. | "Ame ni Utaeba ~Pichi Pichi Chapu Chapu Ran Ran Blues~" (雨に唄えば～ピチピチチャプチャプランランブルース～) | 3:39 |
| 8. | "Rock 'N' Roll Is not Dead" (邦題:ロックンロールは眠らない) | 3:31 |
| 9. | "Papa Mama ~Nozomarenu Baby~" (♂パパママ♀～望まれヌBaby～) | 4:03 |
| 10. | "Sukkyanen Myv ~Myv Man Koshiki Oenka~ (Kohen)" (好っきゃねんMYV～MYVマン公式応援歌～) | 1:58 |
| 11. | "Rock no Gyakushuu -Super Star no Jouken" (ロックの逆襲–スーパースターの条件–) | 3:36 |
| 12. | "Freedom Fighters -Ice Scream Motta Hadashi no Megami to, Kikan Juu Motta Hadaka no Ousama-" (Freedom Fighters–アイスクリーム持った裸足の女神と、機関銃持った裸の王様–) | 4:53 |
