= MYV Pops =

Studio album by Miyavi
- Released: August 2, 2006
- Genres: Pop, rock
- Length: 43:52
- Label: PS Company/Universal

Miyavi chronology
| Miyavizm (2005) | MYV Pops (2006) | Miyaviuta ~Dokusou~ (2006) |

MYV Pops (stylised as MYV☆POPS) is the fourth studio album by Miyavi. It was released on August 2, 2006 and charted 15th on Oricon. Its limited edition comes with an additional DVD, containing a documentary with back stage footage of the artist's previous tour and the making of the music video for "Kimi ni Negai Wo". The first album singles, "Señor Señora Señorita/Gigpig Boogie" and "Kimi ni Negai Wo" charted as tenth and twenty-sixth respectively. This was the first album, where his style shifted towards a more pop sound, wanting to "study pop music in [his] own way".

== Track listing ==
All tracks are written by Miyavi.

| No. | Title | Length |
|---|---|---|
| 1. | "Are You Ready to Rock? -Rhythm Battle Mix-" | 3:55 |
| 2. | "Kekkonshiki no Uta" (結婚式の唄) | 4:52 |
| 3. | "Señor Señora Señorita" (セニョール セニョーラ セニョリータ) | 4:23 |
| 4. | "Gigpig Boogie" (Gigpigブギ) | 3:45 |
| 5. | "Dear My Friend -Tegami wo Kaku Yo-" (Dear my friend -手紙を書くよ-) | 4:27 |
| 6. | "Itoshii Hito (Beta de Suman) -2006 Ver.-" (愛しい人（ベタですまん。）-2006 ver.-) | 5:23 |
| 7. | "Kimi ni Negai Wo" (君に願いを) | 4:40 |
| 8. | "We Love You ~Sekai wa Kimi wo Aishiteru~" (We love you ～世界は君を愛してる～) | 4:38 |
| 9. | "Peace Sign" (ピースサイン) | 4:14 |
| 10. | "Oretachi Dake no Fighting Song (Tsusho: Neba Giba)" (俺達だけのファイティングソング （通称：ネバギバ）) | 3:35 |
