= Miyavi =

Japanese musician and actor (born 1981)

MIYAVI
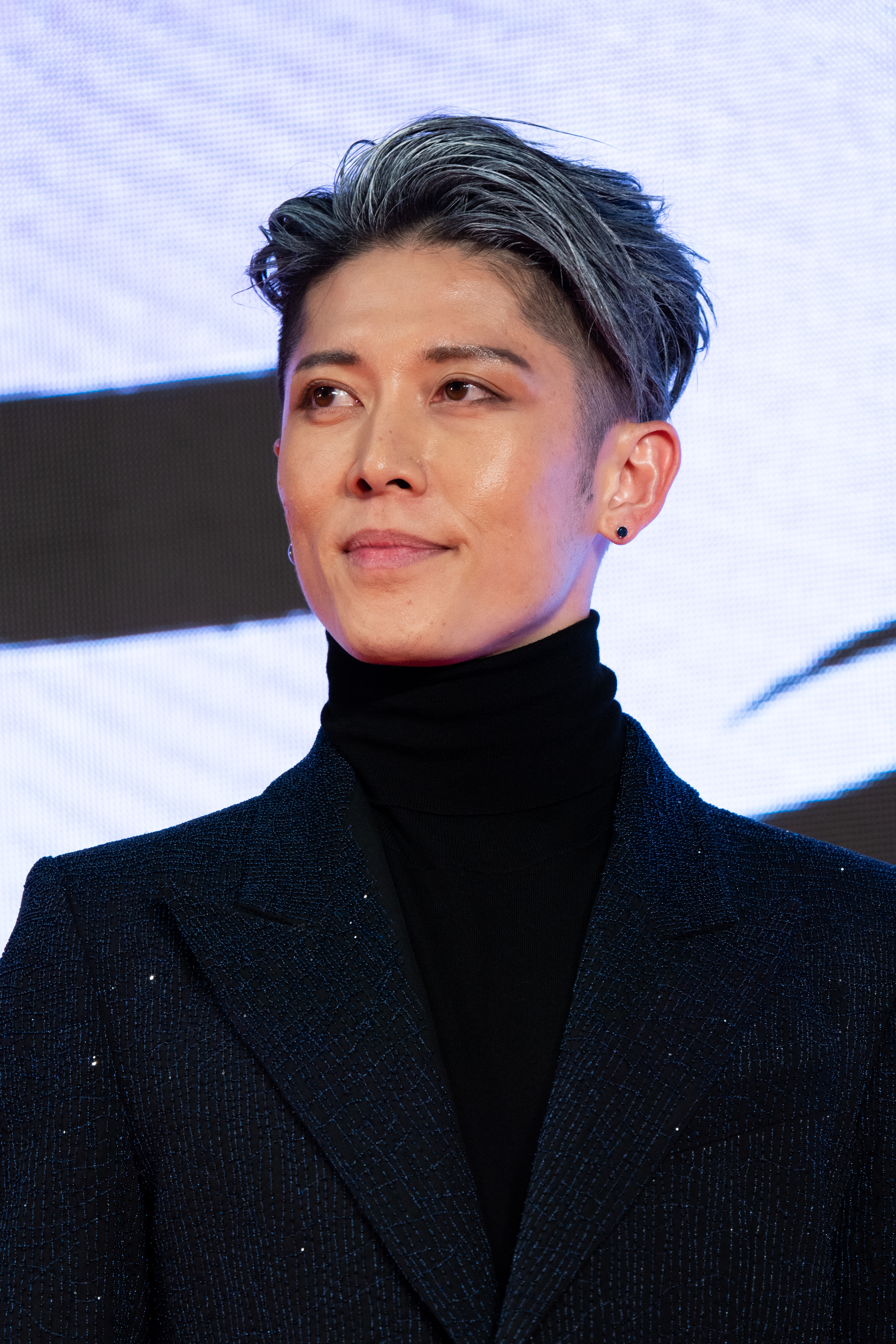
- Miyavi in 2019

Background information
- Also known as: 382; DJ 382; MYV; MYV 382 TOKYO; ミヤヴィ; 雅; 雅—miyavi—; 雅—MIYAVI—; 雅〜みやび〜; 石原 貴雅
- Born: Takamasa Ishihara (石原 崇雅, Ishihara Takamasa); September 14, 1981 (age 45)
- Origin: Konohana-ku, Osaka, Japan
- Genres: Rock; pop; funk; electronica; hip hop
- Occupations: Singer-songwriter, guitarist, actor
- Instruments: Guitar; vocals
- Years active: 1997–present
- Labels: PS Company; Universal J; EMI Music Japan; EMI Records Japan; Virgin; Purple One Star; MoooD; Wrasse; Rise/BMG
- Formerly of: Dué le Quartz; S.K.I.N.; The Last Rockstars
- Spouse: Melody (m. 2009)
- Website: myv382tokyo.com

Takamasa Ishihara (石原 崇雅, Ishihara Takamasa; born September 14, 1981), better known by his stage name MIYAVI (雅, Miyabi; stylized in all caps), is a Japanese guitarist, singer-songwriter, record producer, and actor known for his finger-slapping style of playing a guitar.

He has been active since 1999, first as guitarist for the visual kei rock band Dué le Quartz and then as a solo artist starting in 2002. In 2007, he became a member of the rock supergroup S.K.I.N. and in 2009 founded his own company, J-glam. He toured worldwide several times. From 2022 to 2024, he was a member of the supergroup The Last Rockstars.

In 2014, Miyavi appeared in the motion picture Unbroken, directed by Angelina Jolie, and went on to undertake smaller roles in American productions such as Kong: Skull Island and Stray. Since 2013, Miyavi has been a volunteer at UNHCR, visiting refugee camps around the world. In November 2017, he was appointed an official Goodwill Ambassador.

== Early life ==
Miyavi was born in the Nishikujō district in Konohana-ku ward, Osaka, Osaka Prefecture, to a Japanese mother and a Korean father. After the first grade, he moved to Kawanishi. His father's family, surnamed Lee, came from Jeju Island. Miyavi says that as a child he was a good student and enjoyed playing football. He was accepted into the junior team of Cerezo Osaka, a J-League team. In the second year of junior high school, a sports injury prevented him from pursuing a professional career in sports. Instead, at the age of fifteen, he learned to play the guitar. He bought a guitar and began covering songs by Ray Charles.

He was particularly fond of visual kei acts such as X Japan and Luna Sea but also listened to the blues, Motown, hard rock such as Metallica and L.A. Guns, and industrial music such as Nine Inch Nails. In his third year of junior high school, he started playing with his first band, a visual kei group named Loop.

== Career ==
=== 1999–2003: Dué le Quartz and indies era ===
In 1999, at the age of 17, Miyavi moved to Tokyo, and joined the visual kei rock band Dué le Quartz, where he went by the stage name "Miyabi". Besides being a guitarist, he wrote lyrics, composed, and arranged. When the band split up in 2002, he started his solo career and changed his name to Miyavi. He signed a contract with the independent record label PS Company, and on October 31, his debut studio album Gagaku was released. Before the end of the year three more singles were released: "Shindemo Boogie-Woogie", "Pop Is Dead" and "Jingle Bell", of which only the third managed to enter the top forty on the Oricon charts. Miyavi also starred alongside his former bandmate Sakito in a movie, Ryōma no Tsuma to Sono Otto to Aijin.

On April 23, 2003, his first solo concert was held at the Shibuya Public Hall. Three singles were released: "Jibun Kakumei", "Tariraritarara", and "Coo quack cluck (Ku. Ku. Ru)", which charted as numbers forty, thirty, and forty-two respectively on Oricon. On December 2, his second studio album, Galyuu, was released; it charted forty-fourth.

=== 2004–2006: Majors and pop/acoustic era ===
In 2004, he starred as himself in the film Oresama. In February he went on his first solo tour, Tokyo Dassou, and in July additional dates were added in Korea and Taiwan. In June his seventh single, "Ashita, Genki Ni Naare", was released, which charted twenty-second, and number one on the indies chart. In August a small, free, fan-club-only event was organized in Tokyo Dome, and on the 31st he held his last indie concert at the Nippon Budokan. In October, he signed a major contract with Universal Music Group, but was still co-managed by PS Company. This was followed by the release of his first major (double) single, "Rock no Gyakushuu"/"21sekikei Koushinkyoku", which entered the top ten on the charts.

During May 2005 another single, "Freedom Fighters -Icecream wo Motta Hadashi no Megami to, Kikanjuu wo Motta Hadaka no Ousama-", was released, which charted tenth, and on June 1, his first major album, Miyavizm, was released. It was his first album to enter the top ten in the charts. It was followed by the third major single, "Kekkon Shiki Uta"/"Are You Ready to Rock?", which is his best charting single, along with "Dear My Friend"/"Itoshii Hito", released in 2006; both reached number six. In December he performed at the first Peace & Smile Carnival organized by PS Company.

In late 2005 and for most of 2006, Miyavi shifted to an acoustic/pop sound reflected in his second and third major albums, MYV Pops and Miyaviuta: Dokusō, released on August 2 and September 13 respectively. They charted at fifteenth and twenty-fifth. The first album singles, "Señor Señora Señorita"/"Gigpig Boogie" and "Kimi ni Negai o", are not different in style. They charted as tenth and twenty-sixth respectively. Miyavi showcased his new acoustic style for the first time in the 25 Shūnen Kinen Koen concert series held at Tokyo Geijutsu Gekijo for five days in September around his 25th birthday. Miyavi left for America for the next six months to study the English language, take dance classes, and give street performances on the weekends at Venice Beach.

=== 2007–2008: US debut, S.K.I.N., World Tour ===
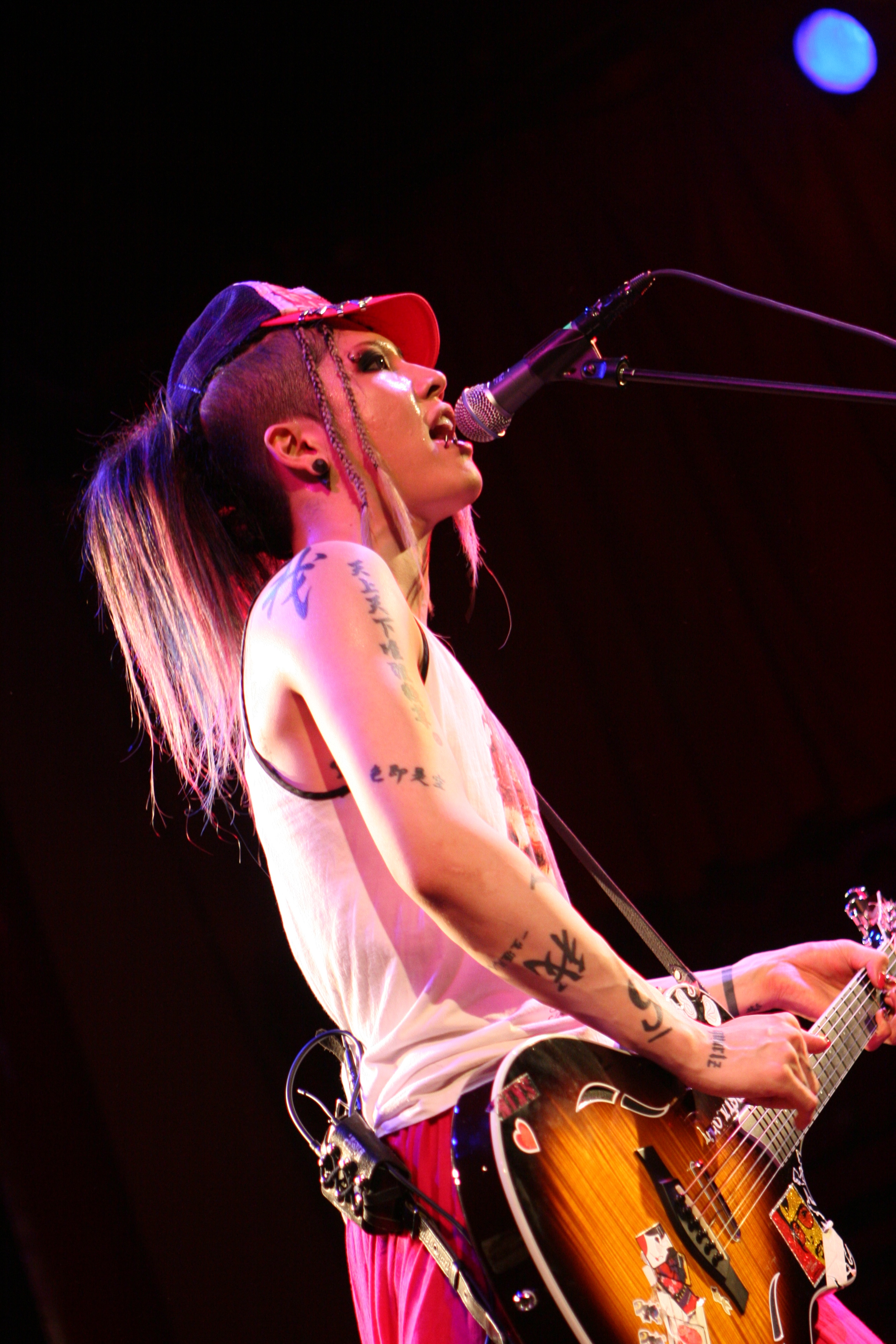
Miyavi in Barcelona, 2008.

On February 17, Miyavi, having been invited by the break dancer Mr. Freeze, performed with the local DJ and percussionist at his first solo concert in the United States, at the Tabu Ultra Lounge in the MGM Grand, Las Vegas. On May 25, at the JRock Revolution concert organized by Yoshiki at the Wiltern Theatre in Los Angeles, it was officially announced that Miyavi would be a member of a band named S.K.I.N. On June 29, the band held their debut and their only concert at Anime Expo in Long Beach, California.

In June, Miyavi's seventh major single (and 14th overall), "Sakihokoru Hana no you ni (Neo Visualizm)"/"Kabuki Danshi", was released in Japan, which charted as twelfth. In July, a remixed extended play, 7 Samurai Sessions -We're Kavki Boiz-, was released, which includes re-arrangements of his past songs. It charted as forty-fourth. It was followed by Miyavi's nationwide tour, which started on July 16. He also performed at Animagic in Bonn, Germany, and in Seoul, South Korea. In November, his tenth major single was released, "Subarashikikana, Kono Sekai - What A Wonderful World", which charted as thirteenth.

On January 16, 2008, his ninth major single was released, "Hi no Hikari Sae Todokanai Kono Basho De", on which he collaborated with fellow Skin guitarist Sugizo. It is his third single to enter the top ten. On March 19, his fourth major studio album was released, titled, This Iz the Japanese Kabuki Rock, which charted as twenty-fifth. In May, it was followed by his very first worldwide tour, This Iz The Japanese Kabuki Rock Tour 2008, with 33 concerts in the United States, Chile, Brazil, Germany, England, the Netherlands, Spain, Sweden, Finland, France, Taiwan, South Korea, mainland China and Japan. The tour covered a distance of approximately 48,385 miles, equivalent to almost two trips around the world, and the majority of the concerts were sold out and covered extensively by media organizations. It was the most successful international tour undertaken by a Japanese artist in history. On June 27, a compilation album, Azn Pride -This Iz the Japanese Kabuki Rock-, was released in Korea and Taiwan, later also in Japan, which charted as forty-fourth. In September, he performed in Beijing. On December 24, a remix album was released, Room No. 382, which failed to enter the top hundred.

=== 2009–2011: Founding J-glam Inc. ===
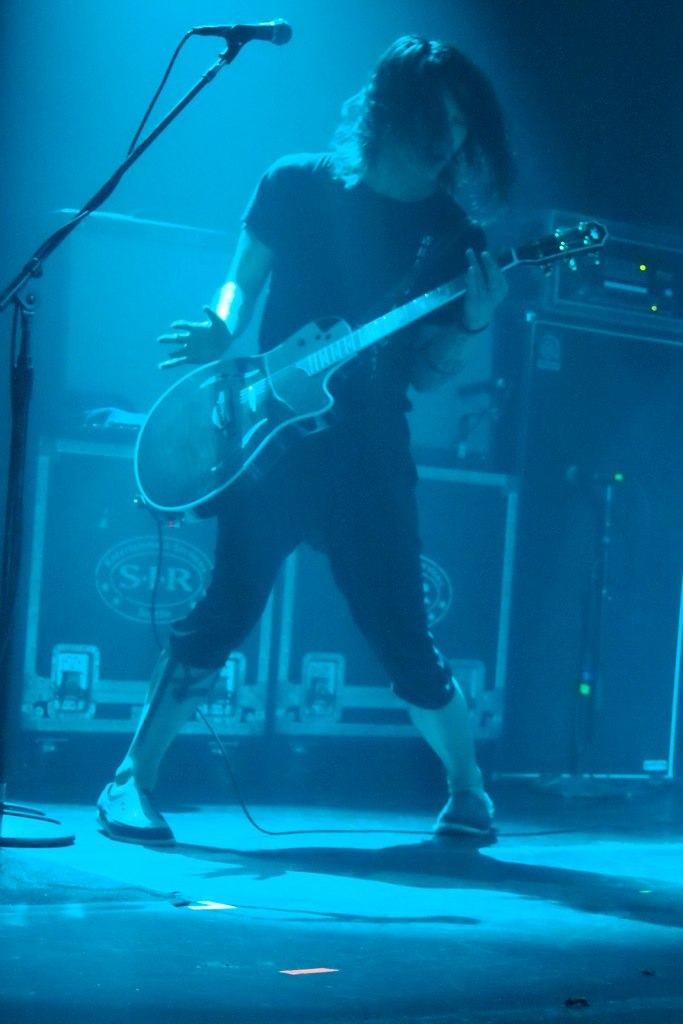
Miyavi performing in New York, 2011.

In 2009, on January 3, Miyavi performed at the 10th Anniversary Commemorative concert by PS Company at the Nippon Budokan. On April 5, Miyavi left the PS Company because their ten-year contract expired, and on April 8 launched his own company, J-glam inc., of which he is the president. On April 22, a compilation album was released, Victory Road to the King of Neo Visual Rock, which includes all his major singles with Universal Group. On June 1, "Super Hero," a new song, was released through his official Myspace, and in September his International Fanclub was opened. On September 19, Miyavi started his second worldwide tour, Neo Tokyo Samurai Black 2009/2010, in Moscow, Russia. He held 17 concerts in Europe, visiting Austria, Hungary and Italy for the first time. The tour immediately continued in South America, with concerts in Brazil, Argentina, Chile and Mexico. The United States leg was canceled due to illness and an injury, but Miyavi managed to perform in November at Anime Matsuri, Texas. On December 31, he signed a new contract with EMI Music Japan.

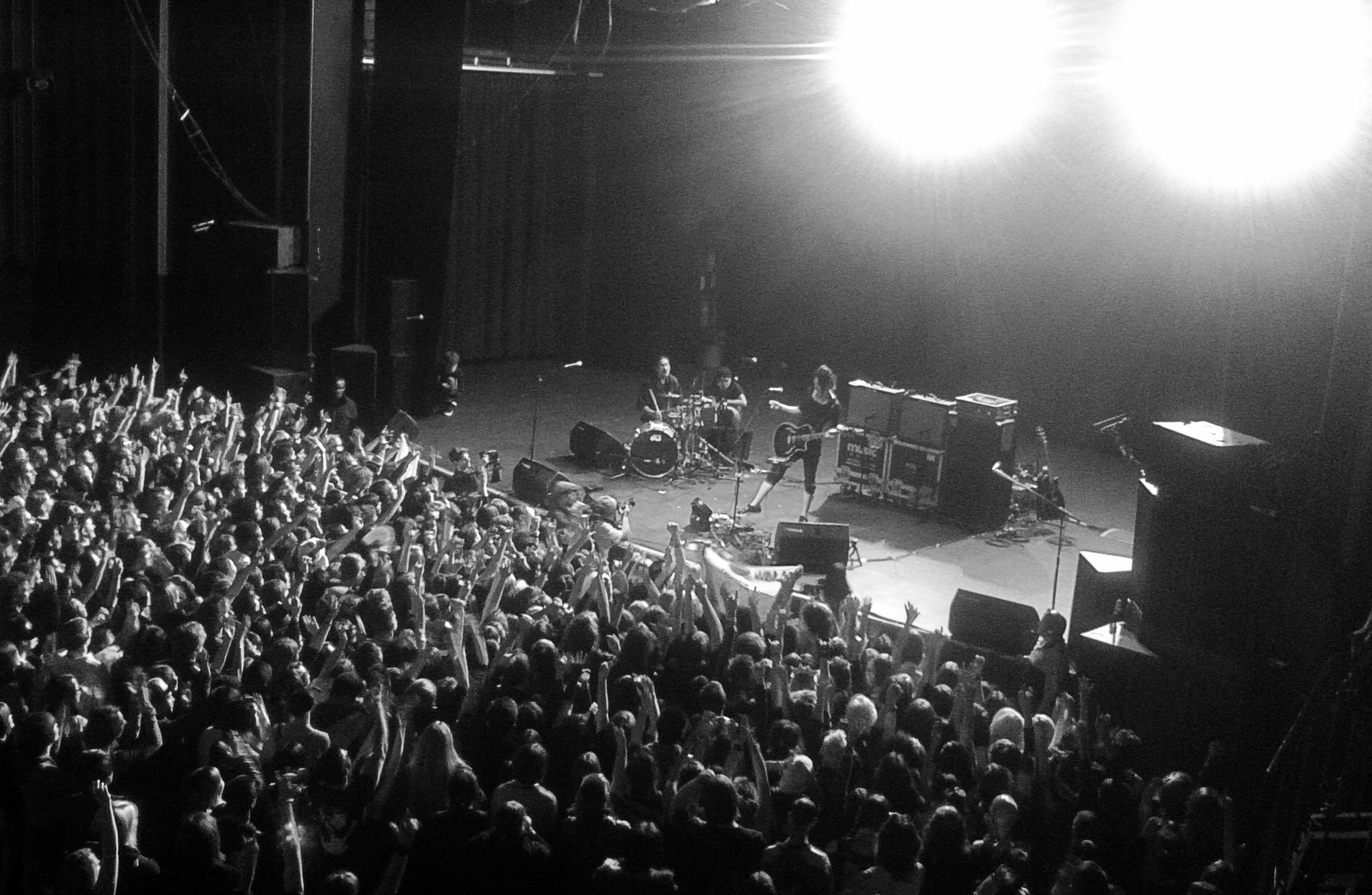
Miyavi on stage in Kentish Town, London, 2011.

On March 10, 2010, his first single with EMI was released, "Survive", via iTunes. The worldwide tour was continued on March 28, with the concert at Human Stage, Okinawa, and nationwide. In June and early July he toured throughout the United States and Canada, and in October for the first time in Australia. On September 15, his eleventh major single was released, "Torture". On October 13, his fifth studio album was released, What's My Name?, which charted as twenty-sixth. On November 6, he performed at the EMI Rocks 50th anniversary event at the Saitama Super Arena.

In March 2011, a new world tour, titled What's My Name?, began in Europe, with his first visit to Belgium. In April the tour continued in Japan, while in July Miyavi performed in France, and in September at the Mount Taishan MAO Rock Festival in China. In May 2011, a live album, Live in London 2011, was released, which was recorded during the London concert in March. On October 5, his twelfth major single, "Strong", was released, in collaboration with Japanese rapper Kreva. It was followed by the North American leg of the tour. Miyavi performed in South America at the Maquinaria festival in Chile, and visited Venezuela, Peru and Colombia for the first time.

=== 2012–2014: Miyavi and international acting career ===
Miyavi in 2012, performing at the Kubana Festival in Russia

In 2012, Miyavi performed on February 19 at the second EMI Rocks event in Saitama Super Arena. On June 29, he performed at the EHZ Festival in Helette, while on June 30, he was the only Asian representative at the Main Square Festival in Arras, France. On July 11, his thirteenth major single, "Day 1", was released in collaboration with the French electronic producer and DJ Yuksek. In August, he performed at the Kubana Festival in Russia. On September 8, Miyavi performed at the 908 Festival, organized by Kreva, in Saitama Super Arena. In October two concerts were held in Indonesia. On November 14, Samurai Sessions vol.1, his second EP, was released, which featured collaboration with various artists, and it was followed by a short nationwide tour. It reached 21 on the Oricon charts.

On February 28, 2013, "Ahead of the Light", Miyavi's fourteenth single, was released; a promotional tour of the same name followed. On June 19, his seventh studio album, Miyavi, was released in Japan, reaching number eight on the Oricon charts.

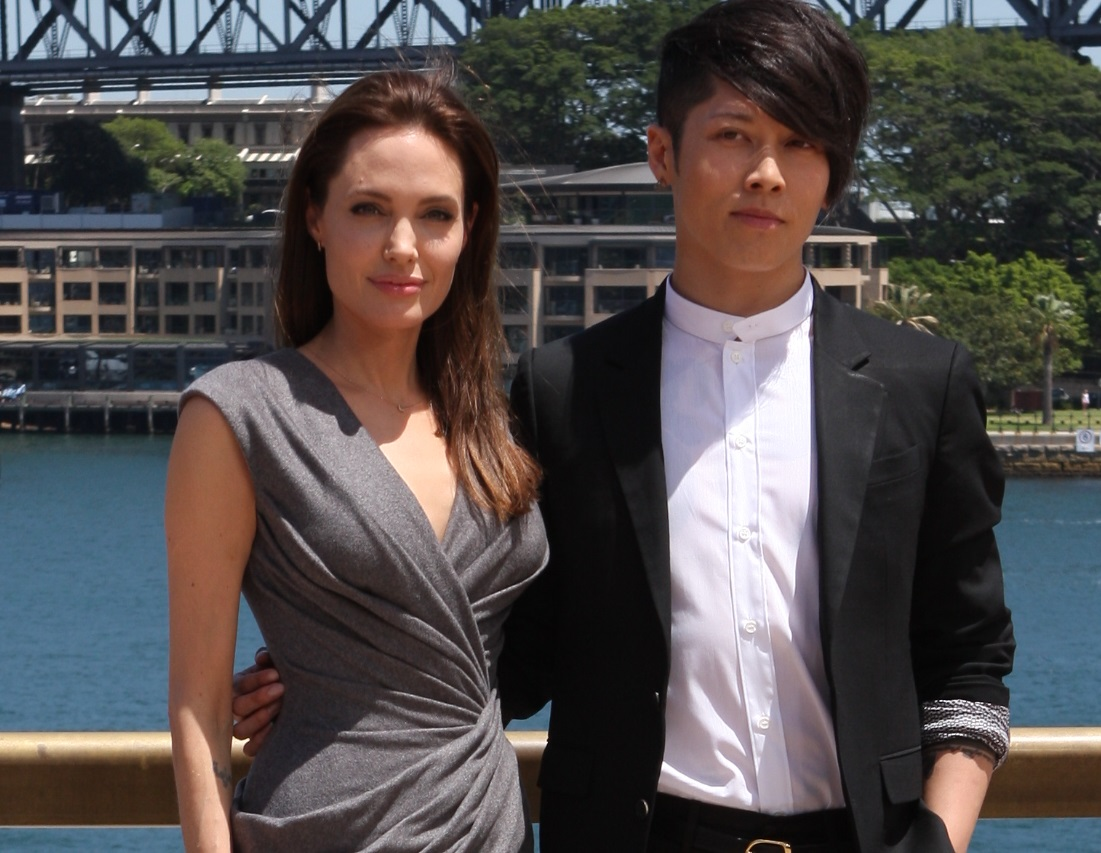
Miyavi with Angelina Jolie in 2014.

On October 12, 2013, it was announced that Miyavi would venture into professional acting with his international debut in the film Unbroken. He played the role of Imperial Japanese Army sergeant Mutsuhiro Watanabe, nicknamed "The Bird", in what was Angelina Jolie's second feature film as director. It was released in December 2014. Miyavi commented that as the movie was somewhat sensitive to the Japanese people, he had hesitated as to whether he should take this role. However, after meeting with Jolie, and given that the underlying theme of this story is forgiveness, he decided to accept it. Miyavi was featured in the same month's edition of Vogue Italia.

In 2013, Miyavi was nominated for the MTV Europe Music Award for Best Japanese Act, and at the MTV Video Music Awards Japan he won the Best Collaboration category with Yuksek. In 2014, the music video of "Horizon" was nominated for the Best Male Video at the MTV Video Music Awards Japan.

In 2014, Miyavi went on his fourth world tour, "Slap the World", which started on February 22 in Malaysia. He continued throughout Europe, followed by the European release of his latest studio album, and visited Mexico City and Los Angeles, with United States release of the album, before returning to Japan for a nationwide tour. Miyavi composed the music for the single "Top of the World" by SMAP, which topped the Oricon singles charts. On August 25, he performed for the first time at Fuji Rock Festival. On September 9, his new single "Real?" was released, on which Miyavi collaborated with Jam and Lewis and Jeff Blue, and also the live video recording from the world tour.

=== 2015–present: The Others, Fire Bird ===
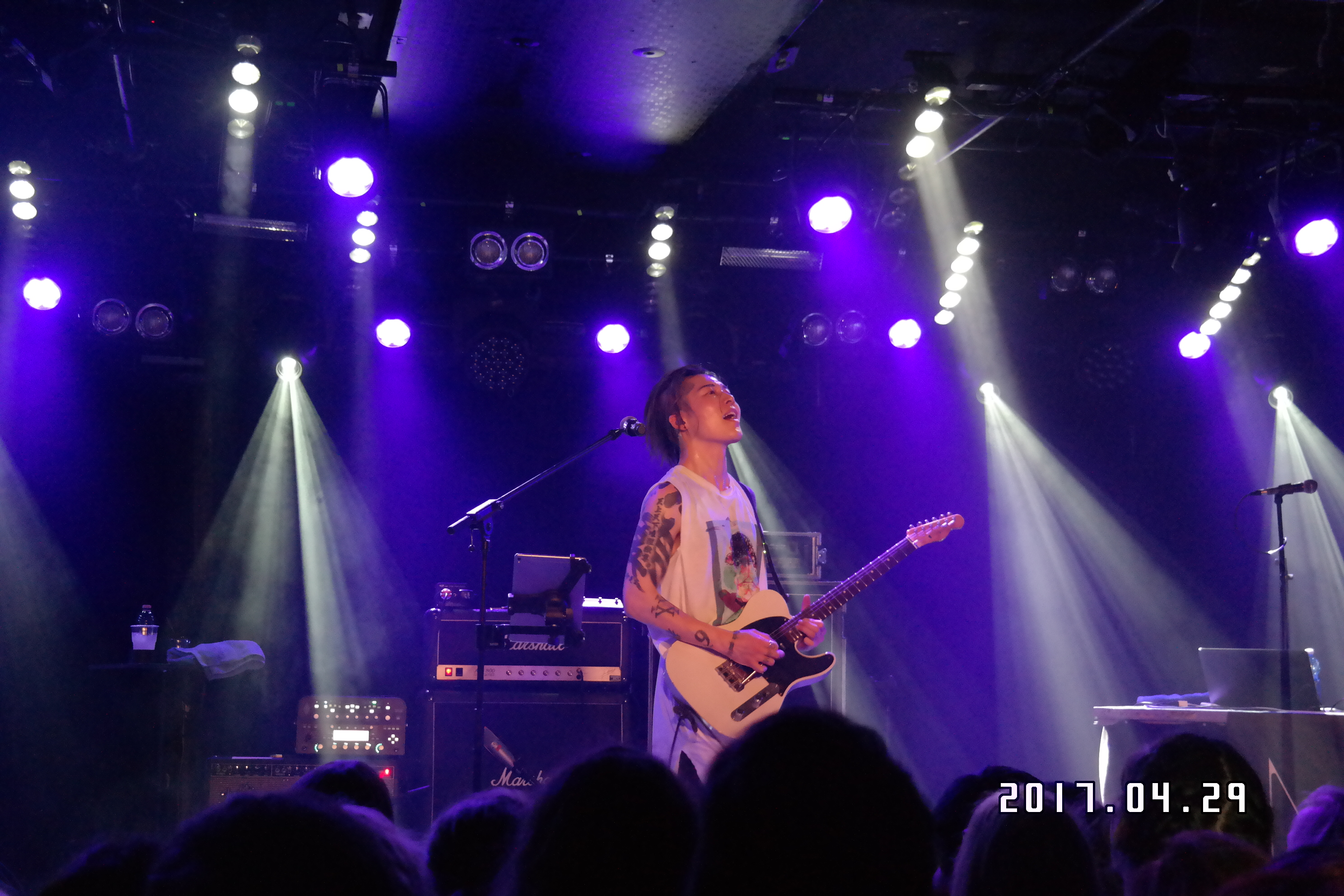
Miyavi on A38 ship in Budapest, Hungary, in 2017 during the Firebird Tour

His next album The Others was released on April 15, 2015, produced by Grammy Award winning Drew Ramsey and Shannon Sanders. The song "Alien Girl" was dedicated to Angelina Jolie, while his title song, "The Others" was later released in a different version to support UNHCR. The album ranked 10th on Oricon and was followed by a two-part nationwide tour, a Europe tour (his fifth on the continent) and a concert in South Korea.

On April 29, Miyavi released a digital single, "Afraid to Be Cool"/"Raise Me Up". His next album, Fire Bird came out on August 31, 2016, and ranked 11th on Oricon. The artist followed it up with a nationwide tour MIYAVI Japan Tour 2016 "NEW BEAT, NEW FUTURE", which included 10 stops. The last performance was held at Makuhari Messe, and was broadcast live on Abema TV, with more than 100,000 viewers watching.

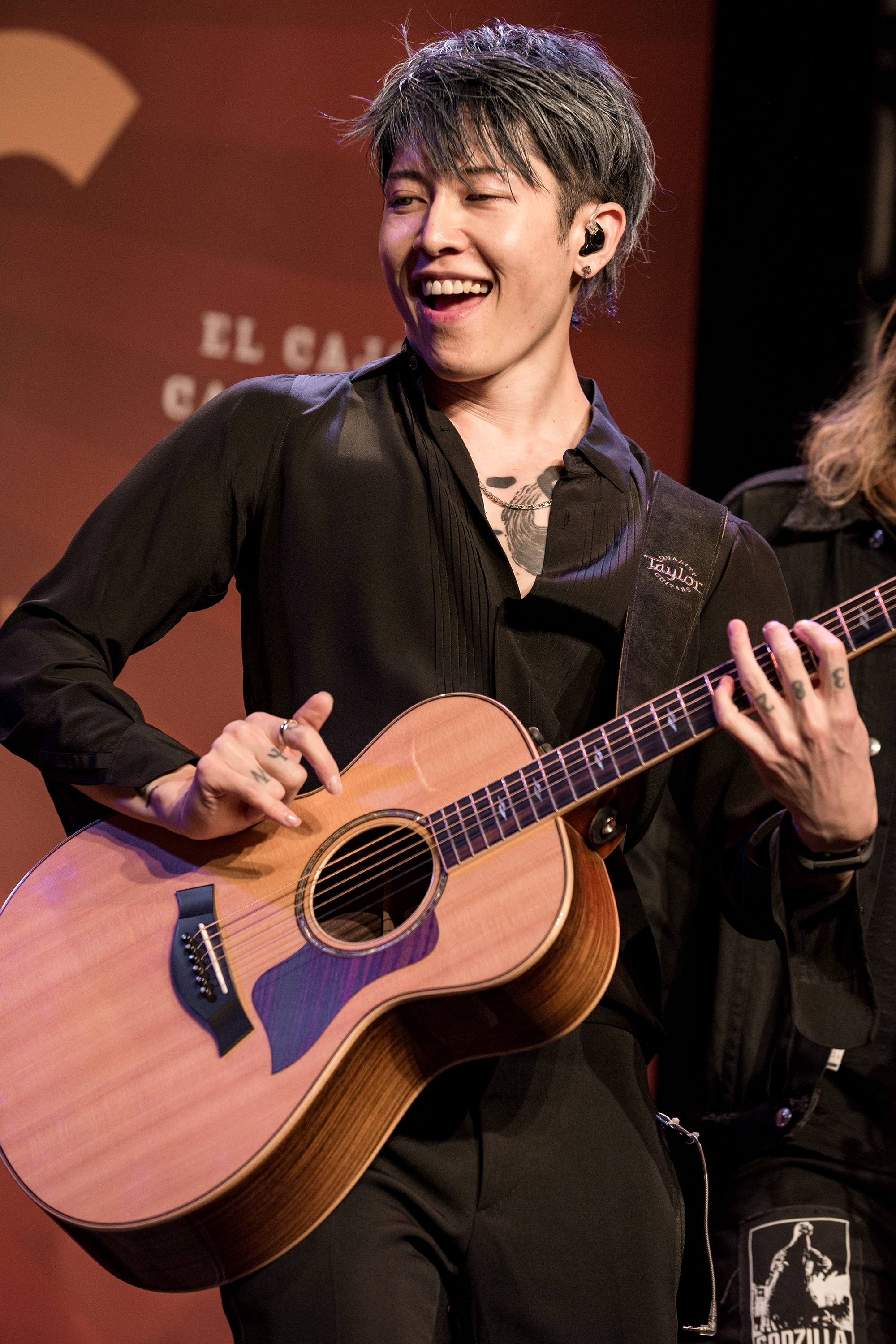
Miyavi performing in the Taylor Guitars showroom at the Winter NAMM Show in Anaheim, Orange County, California, on Saturday, January 27, 2018.

In 2017, he played a cameo role in the movie Kong: Skull Island. In February, the singer revealed a North American and European tour. As a part of Live Nation's Asia on Tour, Miyavi performed in 14 cities, including Vancouver, San Francisco, Los Angeles, New York City and Toronto. He embarked on a solo international tour entitled Fire Bird World Tour. The tour began in Seoul on February 29 and ended in Berlin on May 10, with shows in countries including Austria, Hungary, Germany, Italy, France and the United Kingdom. In March, Miyavi performed at South by Southwest for the first time in his career. On March 29, he released a digital single titled "Live to Die Another Day", which is the theme song of the live-action film Blade of the Immortal. To commemorate his 15th year as a solo artist, Miyavi embarked on a Japanese tour—MIYAVI 15th Anniversary Live "NEO TOKYO 15" started on May 21, with Miyavi releasing an anniversary compilation album, All Time Best: Day 2, on April 5.

In 2018, Miyavi covered "Pink Spider" for the Hide tribute album Tribute Impulse, and was also cast as Byakuya Kuchiki in the live-action film adaptation of Bleach. On February 23, 2019, Miyavi performed an album release concert for Samurai Sessions Vol. 3: Worlds Collide at the El Rey Theatre in Los Angeles with guest performers Duckwrth, Mikky Ekko, Che’nelle, and Yuna. On March 1, 2019, the supernatural action film Stray was released in the U.S., featuring Miyavi in the villain role of Jin. In April 2019, Miyavi performed a headlining concert at Anime Boston. In October, it was announced that Kyoto-based sake brewery Tsuki no katsura (月の桂) launches a new product named after Miyavi.

On December 18, 2019, it was announced during an event held at Zepp DiverCity Tokyo that Miyavi would transfer to Japanese talent company LDH Japan, starting in January 2020. Miyavi, who had been independently active in the music industry for 10 years, explained his decision by mentioning that during those years he often wished for friends to work with and that he resonated with LDH's values, especially their approach to international expansion. He also announced that he would release two solo albums in 2020 and was planning a Japan tour.

On February 14, 2020, it was revealed that Miyavi would release one album before the Tokyo Olympics in summer and one afterwards. The first album, Holy Nights, was released on April 22 and accompanied by a national tour titled MIYAVI“Holy Nights”JAPAN TOUR 2020.

He provided the ending song for the anime ID:Invaded. The series also used his songs "Up", "Samurai 45", and "Butterfly".

Miyavi performed in Japan Expo Malaysia 2020 Goes Virtual on July 19, 2020.

In 2021, Miyavi made his voice acting debut as the character Kōketsu in the anime film Bright: Samurai Soul. In November 2022, Miyavi was announced as a member of the supergroup The Last Rockstars, along with fellow musicians Yoshiki, Hyde, and Sugizo. The group released their first single, "The Last Rockstars (Paris Mix)", in December of the same year.

== Personal life ==
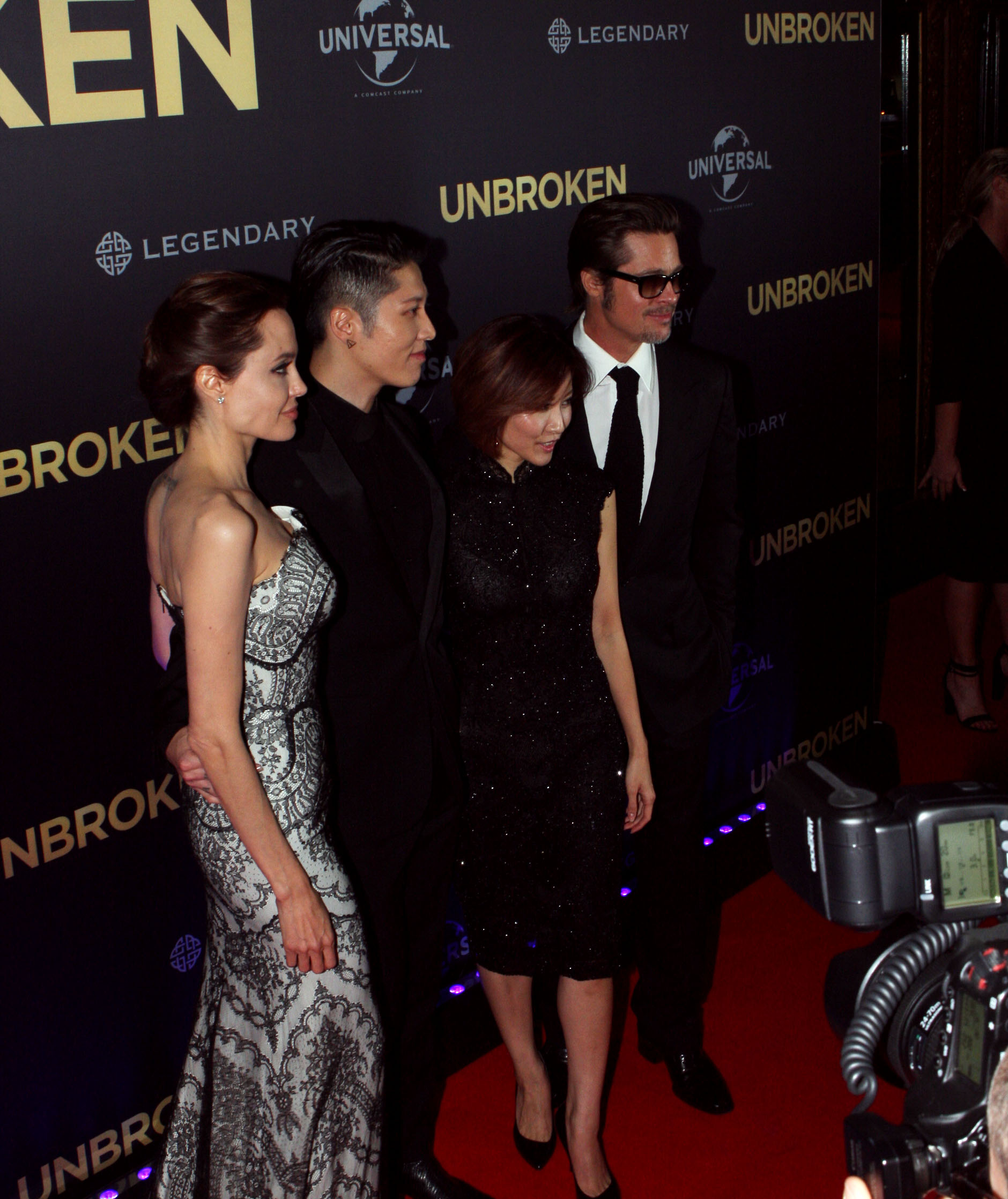
Miyavi with his wife Melody, Angelina Jolie and Brad Pitt at the premiere of Unbroken

On March 14, 2009, Miyavi married Japanese-American pop singer Melody. The couple has three children, Lovelie "Aily" Miyavi (born July 29, 2009, in Japan), Jewelie Aoi (born October 21, 2010, in Japan), and Skyler Kakeru (born February 24, 2021, in the United States). From 2014 to 2021, Miyavi and his family were living in Los Angeles, California, having moved to the area during the release of his film Unbroken. After the birth of his son Skyler, he and his family returned to Tokyo, Japan. In March 2025, they moved to Seoul, South Korea. After becoming a father, Miyavi toned down his on-stage attire.

== Discography ==
Studio albums

- Gagaku (October 31, 2002)
- Galyuu (December 2, 2003)
- Miyavizm (June 1, 2005)
- MYV Pops (August 2, 2006)
- Miyaviuta: Dokusō (September 13, 2006)
- This Iz the Japanese Kabuki Rock (March 19, 2008)
- What's My Name? (October 13, 2010)
- Miyavi (June 19, 2013)
- The Others (April 15, 2015)
- Fire Bird (August 31, 2016)
- Samurai Sessions, Vol. 2 (November 8, 2017)
- Samurai Sessions, Vol. 3: Worlds Collide (December 5, 2018)
- No Sleep Till Tokyo (July 24, 2019)
- Holy Nights (April 22, 2020)
- Imaginary (September 15, 2021)
- Lost in love, Found in pain (October 23, 2024)

== Filmography ==
=== Film ===
Year	Title	Role	Notes	Ref.
2002	Ryoma's Wife, Her Husband and Her Lover		cameo	
2003	Oresama	himself		
2014	Unbroken	Mutsuhiro Watanabe		
2017	Kong: Skull Island	Gunpei Ikari		
2018	Bleach	Byakuya Kuchiki		
2018	Gangoose	Adachi		
2019	Stray	Jin		
2019	Maleficent: Mistress of Evil	Udo		
2021	Kate	Jojima		
2021	Bright: Samurai Soul	Kōketsu	Voice role	
2022	Hell Dogs	Yoshitaka Toake		
2023	Familia	Kaito Enomoto		
2026	The Wrecking Crew	Nakamura		

=== Television ===
Year	Title	Role	Notes	Ref.
2020	Followers	himself		
2021	Arcane	Finn	Voice role	
2024	Yo Gabba Gabbaland	Guest		
2026	Mad Concrete Dreams	Morgan Lee	Korean drama	

== Awards and nominations ==
Year	Awards	Category	Nominated work	Result	Ref.
2013	MTV Europe Music Award	Best Japanese Act		Nominated	
2013	MTV Video Music Awards Japan	Best Collaboration	Day 1 (with Yuksek)	Won	
2014	MTV Video Music Awards Japan	Best Male Video	Horizon	Nominated	
