= Last Moon =

Studio album by Gackt
- Released: April 27, 2016
- Recorded: 2007–2016
- Genre: Rock
- Length: 58:57
- Label: G&Lovers
- Producer: Gackt

Gackt chronology
Mysteries of Yoshitsune I & II (2014)	Last Moon (2016)

Singles from Last Moon
- 1. "Returner (Yami no Shūen)" Released: June 20, 2007; 2. "Setsugekka (The End of Silence)/Zan" Released: December 9, 2009; 3. "P.S. I Love U" Released: February 12, 2014; 4. "Akatsukizukuyo (Day Breakers)" Released: October 1, 2014; 5. "Arrow" Released: October 7, 2015; 6. "Kimi Dake no Boku de Iru Kara" Released: November 23, 2016

Last Moon is the eighth full-length studio album by Japanese recording artist Gackt released on April 27, 2016 in Japan. As a concept album, it is considered to be the final, but not the concluding part of "Moon Saga", a conceptual story which is linked to its predecessor albums Moon (2002), Crescent (2003), and Diabolos (2005), as well as to the movie Moon Child (2003), theatre play Mysteries of Yoshitsune I & II (2012–2014), and two novels (2003, 2014).

== Overview ==
The concept album and its promotional tour, Last Visualive, were Gackt's first in almost seven years. The tour was called "last" because it was considered to be a turning point in his career, whether it was to actually be his last release and tour or not. The tour was called "Visualive" because it combined video, performance and music. On October 7, 2015 the single "Arrow" was released. The tour and album release were supported by Nestlé. Because of this collaboration, Nestlé's official website featured parts of this album until the official release through streaming and download.

The overarching concept was conceived in 2004 during the Sixth Day & Seventh Night tour (song "Utakata no Yume"). It was followed by the Diabolos tour in 2005, and Gackt had planned to do the Last Moon tour before the Requiem et Reminiscence II tour in 2009. However, due to the vast development time of the Mysteries of Yoshitsune I & II plays he was not able to go through with RR II concept in time, and instead went ahead with the Visualive form utilizing concepts from the RR II project.

== Moon Saga ==
Conceptually, the story of the "Moon Saga" is separated into four chapters. The first chapter takes places roughly between the years 700 and 1300, the second between 1300 and 1600, the third between 1600 and "current" time (2000), and the fourth between the "current" time (2000) and the future (2045). The work from 2002 (Moon) and 2003 (Crescent, movie Moon Child, novel Moon Child Requiem) covered the fourth chapter, from 2005 (Diabolos) took place between the second and third chapter, while from 2012 to 2014 (theatre play Mysteries of Yoshitsune I & II, novel Moon Saga Mysteries of Yoshitsune) and 2016 (Last Moon) depict the first chapter. The whole story is set in Europe and Asia (mostly Japan), depending on which meaningful aspects of the story were being focused on.

The idea was to create a story where the Oni (Japanese demons) were the origin of vampires, and eventually of the central character of the first chapter, Yoshitsune Minamoto. According to this narrative framen, in the Heian period there existed beings called as Mononoke (spirits), and Mononofu, who were born inbetween humans and Mononoke, with special powers from both Mononoke and humans. The heritage of Mysteries of Yoshitsune spread out when a member with inherited blood crossed over to Europe, and became the progenitor of the later vampires.

The story from the first chapter follows the "darkside inhabitants" – darts, who were scattered all over Europe, fighting for different countries even against fellow inhabitants in the shadow of history. The second chapter how they tried to make something that will surpass them and for purpose of fighting, so were created 13 "shitos" (使徒, apostle, disciple), but their body was incomplete and couldn't appear under the sun. From the third chapter, now known as "vampires", is followed their life. They didn't pursue their purpose of life, and as become aware of the darkness inside them, raises the question what is now their purpose of existence. After the awakening, two of the thirteen shito died (the man and woman shown in the music video of "Todokanai Ai to Shitteita no ni Osaekirezu ni Aishitsuzuketa...") leaving behind eleven. Five out of the eleven decided to stand up and fight against the darts, their creators. They wanted to prove that there was meaning in their existence, however they were outnumbered, and there was only one shito survivor.

However, it is not a vampire's story as they were presented as a way of expressing a certain evil side and existence of humans. People long for immortality, believing it to be a wonderful thing, while vampires know how painful such an immortal existence can be and seek a peaceful death, because without death the life has no meaning. The theme of the concept, like his other in Requiem et Reminiscence albums, is about the existential questions of humanity. The "Moon Saga" is a symbolic story about the repetition of human sins, war and the question of what is the ultimate meaning of human life. The history of mankind's struggle – the suffering and sorrow in the quest for the virtues and ideas.

=== Last Moon ===
The tour is titled as Saigo no Tsuki ("Last Moon" in English language), but the saigo is not written in kanji 最後 (last, end) yet 最期 which has a nuance of "the final moments" or "dying days", as it is not the end of the "Moon" concept. The theme of the album and tour is people thoughts during the last moments of death while looking at the Moon. The symbolism of the Moon in the story is for the reason it's witnessing the tragedies that humanity repeats, and thus through the Moon people can symbolically look back on the life path they walked on.

The story of the Last Moon in the basis has the story of Mysteries of Yoshitsune, but it is actually the perspective about the former by the non-human entities from the Moon who come to collect the souls, whose figures dressed in black can be seen in the music video and cover of singles "Returner (Yami no Shūen)" and "Arrow", as well album. The non-human narrator during the show questions why the humans with such strong feelings of friendship and love, repeat the same mistakes, can't stop hurting each other, and spend short lives fighting.

== Composition ==
According to Gackt, it's a heavy album with deep world view, and it's definitely not suitable to be simply played in the background. Almost every song was created from the story sketched above and features a special image or place in the live performance. Having studied traditional Japanese poetry, Gackt incorporated a mix of traditional and modern speech in the lyrics, and experimented with the songs' beat, noting that traditional Japanese poetry is more suitable for an irregular beat. He also listened to the esoteric Buddhist sutras. The songs are distinctive for their blend of modern Western musical instruments and traditional Japanese instruments, like Shakuhachi, Shamisen, Shinobue, Erhu, Shō, Koto and Taiko, as well as Gagaku, a kind of music called by Gackt as "Zipangu rock" from which can be sensed the country of origination.

The song "Arrow" was meant for the very end of the story, but was performed at the start of the live. It is an intense ballad rock song, lyrics of which deal with the sacrifice for an ideal future. Some songs like "Hana mo Chiyu" are written as waka, which have a 5-7-5 pattern, and are suitable for irregular quintuple or septuple beats. The song "Kugutsu ga Gotoku" also has archaic Japanese words. The song "Kimi Dake no Boku de Iru Kara" is about the heartbreaking determination and the desire to protect a lover dying from illness. Its animated music video features Gackt. The song is conceptually related to "P.S. I Love U" as the man's feelings for a woman are expressed in the first, while the woman's feelings about the man are expressed in the second song.

Although not in the track list, the songs "Hakuro" and "Sakura Chiru..." are part of the four song series from the first chapter of "Moon Saga", along with "Setsugekka (The End of Silence)" and "Akatsukizukuyo (Day Breakers)".

== Release ==
The album was released on April 27, 2016 in two physical editions, regular (CD; GLCD-00016) and limited (CD+DVD; GLCD-00015), as well as on Spotify. Until November 6, 2015 a special limited edition (GLCD-00014) was available on Gackt's official website's global store. In November 2016 was announced that the album is being re-recorded for an English language version and future release.

During the tour was sold limited edition album titled "Last Visualive Saigo no Tsuki –Last Moon–" (GLCD-00017) with two CDs (CD 1 48:28 – CD 2 59:07 minutes), with the whole live setlist in original order.

=== Charts ===
In its first week the studio album reached number six on the Oricon's weekly album chart, with 16,447 copies sold, and topped the Oricon independent album chart. On its first week the album charted at thirteen on the Billboard Japan's Hot Albums chart, while rising to number ten at the Top Albums Sales chart.

Single "Arrow", released on 7 October 2015, reached number fifteen, and charted for four weeks on the Oricon's weekly single chart. As the single was released by an independent label it was also featured on the Oricon indies singles chart, peaking at number two. On the Billboard Japan Hot 100 it peaked at number sixty, and peaked at number fourteen on the Top Single Sales chart. Single "Kimi Dake no Boku de Iru Kara", released on 23 November 2016, reached number thirty on the Oricon's weekly single chart, selling 4,107 copies. On the Billboard Japan peaked at number forty-four on the Top Single Sales chart.

== Last Visualive tour ==
On August 8 Gackt's first national (and world) tour in seven years, called Last Visualive Saigo no Tsuki –Last Moon–, was announced. Although the original intention was to be held in 2015, it was postponed to 2016. It started with a fanclub only concert on March 19 at Misato City Cultural Hall in Saitama, with the first public show being held on March 21 at the Colany Hall in Yamanashi. In January 2016, because most of the 25 concerts sold out, an additional 16 were announced, making the total 41 concerts. The tour ended on July 3 with two consecutive shows at the Saitama Super Arena, consisting of a total of 42 concerts in thirty cities and over 120,000 visitors. In the ending credits of the final show were announced world tour and return tour in Japan in 2017. The next year, during the release of conceptually related single "Tsumi no Keishō (Original Sin)" in March 2017, Gackt was still talking about holding a world tour.

The final show was broadcast on WOWOW in October 2016, and its live recording were released in regular and premium DVD and Blu-ray edition on March 14, 2017. In March 2017 it was screened in cinema.

=== Show ===
The concert shows generally lasted about four hours (with circa one hour long MC), and are focused around the album's track list. The concert's stage set looked like a post-apocalyptic movie set, they include videos which are related to the Mysteries of Yoshitsune I & II, as well as various projection mapping scenery on the back screen.

The lives are conceptually divided into four parts. The first part begins with the video showing Yoshitsune at the battlefield, narration questions like "why do people repeat the same mistakes?", and with many fateful arrows approaching Yoshitsune, which shooting has commanded brother Yoritomo, the video ends and starts the performance of the first song "Arrow". The music video of "Returner (Yami no Shūen)" shows Yoshitsune being pierced by the arrows. During the performance of "Akatsukizukuyo (Day Breakers)" was montage of battle sciences, and Yoshitsune's improbable wish to remain close to the friends until the next meeting.

The second part begins with the video showing part of the story which occurred 9 years earlier in 1180 between brothers Yoshitsune and Yoritomo, and the Heian Era scene is shown by the instrumental performance of "Utakata no Yume" where Gackt played the Japanese traditional instrument shamisen. The song "Kugutsu ga Gotoku" is performed with particularly intense animation and boogaloo dance choreography, followed by pantomime dance during "Youranka (Lulling)".

The third part begins with the film from "Camui Gakuen", cover concerts festival conceptualized around fictional school. The sudden difference in the world view of the songs and stage is to release the audience from the built up tension and make them engage in playful entertainment. It includes an hour long MC, and both "Kimi Dake no Boku de Iru Kara" and "P.S. I Love U" started in a cappella.

The final fourth part begins with the video of Yoshitsune waking up from the dream about his friends with whom he fought together, realizing he is pierced with arrows, which is followed by the ending performance of "Setsugekka (The End of Silence)", and video showing the ascending soul of Yoshitsune.

=== Set list ===
Saitama Super Arena 2016

The conceptual division in parts of the main songs, not including several instrumental compositions related to the videos.

Part One

1. "Arrow"
2. "Hana mo Chiyu"
3. "Returner (Yami no Shūen)"
4. "Ride Or Die"
5. "Akatsukizukuyo (Day Breakers)"

Part Two

1. "Utakata no Yume" (泡沫の夢)
2. "Zan"
3. "Kugutsu ga Gotoku"
4. "Youranka (Lulling)" (揺籃歌-Lulling-)

Part Three

1. "One More Kiss"
2. "Mirror"
3. "U+K"
4. "WooHa Baby!!"
5. "Koi no Friday!!!"
6. "Kimi Dake no Boku de Iru Kara"
7. "P.S. I Love U"

Part Four

1. "Setsugekka (The End of Silence)"

== Track listing ==
All tracks are written by Gackt. C.

CD
No.	Title	Length
1.	"Arrow"	5:44
2.	"Hana mo Chiyu" (花も散ゆ; "Even Flowers Fall")	3:25
3.	"Returner (Yami no Shūen)" (Returner ～闇の終焉～; "Returner (Demise of Darkness)")	4:21
4.	"Ride Or Die"	3:29
5.	"Akatsukizukuyo (Day Breakers)" (暁月夜 -Day Breakers-; "Moonlit Dawn (Day Breakers)")	5:55
6.	"Zan" (斬 ～Zan～; "Slash")	4:37
7.	"Kugutsu ga Gotoku" (傀儡が如く; "Like a Puppet")	4:01
8.	"One More Kiss"	4:03
9.	"WooHa Baby!!" (舞哈Baby!! -WooHa-; "Wǔ hā Baby!! (WooHa)")	3:50
10.	"Koi no Friday!!!" (恋のFriday!!!; "Friday of Love!!!")	4:27
11.	"Kimi Dake no Boku de Iru Kara" (キミだけのボクでいるから; "Because I'll be yours alone")	5:00
12.	"P.S. I Love U"	6:01
13.	"Setsugekka (The End of Silence)" (雪月花 -The end of silence-; "Snow, Moon and Flowers (The End of Silence)")	6.42

DVD
No.	Title	Length
1.	"Arrow"
2.	"Returner (Yami no Shūen)"
3.	"Akatsukizukuyo (Day Breakers)"
4.	"P.S. I Love U"
5.	"Setsugekka (The End of Silence)"
6.	"Kugutsu ga Gotoku" (hidden music video available with a serial code)

Last Visualive Saigo no Tsuki –Last Moon– CD 1
No.	Title	Length
1.	"Prologue" (instrumental)	5:16
2.	"Opening" (instrumental)	8:17
3.	"Arrow"
4.	"Hana mo Chiyu"
5.	"Returner (Yami no Shūen)"
6.	"Ride Or Die"
7.	"Akatsukizukuyo (Day Breakers)"
8.	"Utakata no Yume (泡沫の夢)" (instrumental)	2:40
9.	"Zan"
10.	"Kugutsu ga Gotoku"
11.	"Youranka (Lulling) (揺籃歌-Lulling-)"	2:48

Last Visualive Saigo no Tsuki –Last Moon– CD 2
No.	Title	Length
1.	"U+K Unplugged" (instrumental/voice introduction)	2:26
2.	"One More Kiss"
3.	"Mirror"	4:55
4.	"U+K"	4:22
5.	"WooHa Baby!!"
6.	"Koi no Friday!!!"
7.	"Kimi Dake no Boku de Iru Kara"
8.	"P.S. I Love U"
9.	"Momozono no Chikai (桃園の誓い)" (instrumental)	8:19
10.	"Setsugekka (The End of Silence)""
11.	"Ending" (instrumental)	4:26
12.	"Epilogue" (instrumental)	5:23

=== Notes ===
- The title of "Kugutsu ga Gotoku" was originally revealed as "Kugutsu no Gotoku" (傀儡の如く), but later changed to the current title.
- The song "Kimi Dake no Boku de Iru Kara" is the opening theme song for the anime Trickster in which Gackt was a voice actor.

== Album credits ==
Personnel (Last Moon CD)

- Vocals, Piano: Gackt
- Guitar, Violin: You
- Guitar: Chachamaru
- Guitar, Bass, Drums: Takumi
- Bass: Ju-Ken, Ikuo
- Drums: Jun-Ji
- Strings: Ittetsu Gen
- Shakuhachi: Akihisa Kominato

Production

- All Producer: Gackt
- Sound Creative Manager: Takumi
- Arrangement, Programming: Takumi, You, Chachamaru, Masafumi Okubo, Daichi Yokota, Syusei Tsukamoto, Tatsuya Kurauchi
- Recording Engineer: Masahiro Shimbo (Mixer's Lab), Katsuyuki Abe (Mixer’s Lab), Kentaro Kikuchi
- Mixing Engineer/Programming: Masahiro Shimbo, Masahito Tobisawa (Flash Link Studio)
- Mastering Engineer: Yasuji Maeda (Bernie Grundam Mastering)

Design

- Art direction & Design: Jun Misaki
- Photographer: Keiju Takenaka (D-Cord)

Personnel (Set List CDs)

- Sound Creative Manager: Takumi
- Arrangement: Yuzuru Jinma, Masafumi Okubo
- Erhu: Shin
- Japanese Shinobue bamboo flute: Yasukazu Kano
- Japanese Taiko drum: Ryuji Sato, Shota Sato
- Shakuhachi: Hideki Ishigaki
- Tsugaru Shamisen: Taichi Hikida
- Violin: Mio Abe
- Mixing Engineer: Yu Aoki, Masahiro Shimbo
