= Akatsukizukuyo (Day Breakers) =

Single by Gackt

from the album Last Moon
- Released: October 1, 2014
- Recorded: 2014
- Genre: Symphonic rock
- Length: 5:55
- Label: G&Lovers
- Songwriter: Gackt C.
- Producer: Gackt

Gackt singles chronology
"P.S. I Love U" (2014)	"Akatsukizukuyo (Day Breakers)" (2014)	"Arrow" (2015)

"Akatsukizukuyo (Day Breakers)" (暁月夜 -Day Breakers-; subtitle lit. "Moonlit Dawn") is the forty-fifth single from Japanese recording artist Gackt, released on October 1, 2014. It is the theme song for Square Enix's role-playing game 3594e for iOS.

== Overview ==
Gackt collaborated with Square Enix for the release of their iOS game 3594e, based after the story of Romance of the Three Kingdoms, a Chinese historical novel. The in-game playable character, military general Lü Bu, was voiced by him.

The song is the last installment of four songs from the first chapter of "Moon Saga", along with "Setsugekka (The End of Silence)" from 2009, "Hakuro" from 2012, and "Sakura Chiru..." from 2013.

The single was released in several editions. The usual CD-only edition, limited edition with bonus DVD, and Tsutaya edition, available only at Tsutaya stores and is the usual CD-only edition, but with different cover. Besides these, previously through Gackt's global store was available for preorder a limited premium edition with a CD jacket of a life-sized body pillow and additional quartet version of the song. Like Gackt's previous single, it's available for digital download in all major online stores all over the world.

== Track listings and formats ==
All tracks are written by Gackt C.

CD (GLCD-00007)
No.	Title	Length
1.	"Akatsukizukuyo (Day Breakers) (暁月夜 -Day Breakers-)"
2.	"Akatsukizukuyo (Day Breakers) (Orchestra Ver.)"
3.	"Akatsukizukuyo (Day Breakers) (Instrumental)"
4.	"Akatsukizukuyo (Day Breakers) (Orchestra Ver. Instrumental)"

CD + DVD (GLCD-00006)
No.	Title	Length
1.	"Akatsukizukuyo (Day Breakers) (Music Video)"

Premium (GLCD-00005)
No.	Title	Length
1.	"Akatsukizukuyo (Day Breakers) (Quartet Ver.)"

- Tsutaya (GLCD-00008)

== Charts ==
Chart (2014)	Peak position
Oricon Weekly Singles	8
Billboard Japan Hot 100	21
