= Tsumi no Keishō (Original Sin) =

Single by Gackt
- Released: March 22, 2017
- Recorded: 2017
- Genre: Rock
- Length: 4:21
- Label: Arutemate
- Songwriter: Gackt C.
- Producer: Gackt

Gackt singles chronology
"Kimi Dake no Boku de Iru Kara" (2016)	"Tsumi no Keishō (Original Sin)" (2017)

Music video
- "Tsumi no Keishō (Original Sin)" on YouTube

"Tsumi no Keishō (Original Sin)" (罪の継承～Original Sin～; lit. "Inheritance of Sin: Original Sin") is the forty-eighth single of Japanese recording artist Gackt. It was released on March 22, 2017. The single was used as the ending theme for the anime Trickster. In the song Gackt was seeking to portray the essence of human beings.

== Overview ==
Gackt voiced The Fiend with Twenty Faces, main antagonist in the anime Trickster, as well provided the anime's first opening theme song from episodes 1 to 12, "Kimi Dake no Boku de Iru Kara", while "Tsumi no Keishō (Original Sin)" was the second ending theme song from episodes 13 to 24.

Gackt noted that he done a gothic theme already during his band era (Malice Mizer) and that likes edgy music with a message. However, as until now he was doing music with record label companies which pushed many regulations he could not express his originality to the extreme. From the anime production team also received an order to make a song with feeling of happy future, but as he does not consider himself a commercial writer decided to do something unexpected. The same thing regularly happened with previous requests, for example "Redemption" and "Longing" for Dirge of Cerberus: Final Fantasy VII instead of ballads have also been fierce songs. He considers he is returning to be an original musician as whether the CDs success or public opinion, the musicians' essence is to compose what he likes, to perform and impress the public.

== Composition and lyrics ==
The song was written and composed by Gackt. It has symphonic and gothic sound, while the orchestra version has a variety of dramas. The story underlying the song's lyrics are the emotions of characters appearing in the story of Moon Saga, the reason why became who they are, a work related to the latest studio album Last Moon. As the character in the anime is a criminal he also decided to make music which will synchronize with him and anime ending, kind of solve the mystery to his darkness. It is planned to be included in changed live tracklist along other produced music for the upcoming Japanese tour which will be held after the world tour.

Both the music video and the lyrics have a relevant message about life and human crime. They are appealing to the problem modern society faces. However the concept of sin, in this context, does not mean crime, but the simple act of existence of humans in this world, similar to the Christian original sin, means that people are born guilty of sin. A historical tragedy of a creature that seeks destruction despite its ability to create, and this sin is repeated endlessly. The message would be to not escape from the reality of living with sin, but to face Pandora's box which is in one's own mind and heart. People need to do what they must, but with approach of deep thinking to "be", without superficiality or period trends, thoughtless act on reaction, not to pour into self unexamined information, what is said and judged to be good and evil because they change and differ according to time and background.

== Release and artwork ==
It was in pre-sale digitally on February 22, while generally was released on March 22, 2017. The single was released in regular edition (CD) and limited edition (CD+DVD) by record label Arutemate. Both edition cover artwork feature Gackt restrained to chair with chain, in limited edition with blindfolded eyes while in regular edition looking upwards, with the artwork related to the music video.

== Music video and synopsis ==
The single's music video is a "problematic work" because it shows a brutal portrayal of violence, bloody scenes and fate of a girl and boy, and thus has R designation and age restriction on YouTube. Gackt did not mind director's advice that it would not be broadcast on television because of its explicitness as it will stream on internet. The original plot about succession of sin that happens from the past to the future, related to Moon Saga, was difficult to realize in the meaning of eras and thus decided to depict it in present era.

The video premiered on March 13 during the screening of Last Visualive Saigo no Tsuki –Last Moon– at Marunouchi Piccadilly theatre in Yūrakuchō, Tokyo.

== Track listings and formats ==
All tracks are written by Gackt C.

CD (XQMQ-1010)
No.	Title	Length
1.	"Tsumi no Keishō (Original Sin) (罪の継承～Original Sin～)"
2.	"Tsumi no Keishō (Original Sin) (Orchestra Ver.)"
3.	"Tsumi no Keishō (Original Sin) (Instrumental)"

CD + DVD (XQMQ-91001)
No.	Title	Length
1.	"Tsumi no Keishō (Original Sin) (Music Clip)"

== Charts performance ==
The single reached number eighteen on the Oricon's weekly singles chart. In the first week it sold 5,451 copies. As the single was released by an independent label it was also featured on the Oricon indies singles chart, peaking at number three. On the Billboard Japan peaked at number eighteen on the Top Single Sales chart.

Chart (2017)	Peak position
Oricon Weekly Singles	18
Oricon Indie Singles	3
Billboard Japan Top Singles Sales	18
