= Kimi ga Oikaketa Yume =

Single by Gackt

from the album Crescent
- Released: March 19, 2003
- Genre: Alternative rock, progressive rock
- Length: 19:14
- Label: Nippon Crown
- Songwriter(s): Gackt C.
- Producer(s): Gackt

Gackt singles chronology
"Wasurenai Kara" (2002)	"Kimi ga Oikaketa Yume" (2003)	"Tsuki no Uta" (2003)

"Kimi ga Oikaketa Yume" (君が追いかけた夢) is a single released by Gackt on March 19, 2003 under Nippon Crown. It peaked at second place on the Oricon weekly chart and charted for ten weeks. It was certified gold by RIAJ.

== Track listing ==
No.	Title	Length
1.	"Kimi ga Oikaketa Yume (君が追いかけた夢)"	4:30
2.	"Birdcage"	5:27
3.	"Kimi ga Oikaketa Yume (君が追いかけた夢) (Instrumental)"	4:29
4.	"Birdcage (Instrumental)"	5:17
