= Mysteries of Yoshitsune I & II =

Moon Saga: Mysteries of Yoshitsune I & II

Soundtrack album by Gackt
- Released: October 1, 2014
- Genre: Instrumental, Electronic
- Length: 40:54; 70:32
- Label: G&Lovers
- Producer: Gackt

Gackt chronology
Best of the Best: Mild and Wild (2013)	Moon Saga: Mysteries of Yoshitsune I & II (2014)	Last Moon (2016)

Moon Saga: Mysteries of Yoshitsune I & II is a duology of theatre stage plays written, composed and directed by Japanese recording artist Gackt. The original productions are notable for the first major use of projection mapping in theatre stage plays. The original soundtrack was released on October 1, 2014, and compiles music from the plays. It consists of two music CDs, one for each chapter, the first of which was performed in 2012, while the second was performed in 2014.

== Theatre play ==
The "Moon Saga - Yoshitsune Hiden" (Moon Saga 義経秘伝, lit. Mysteries of Yoshitsune), is a theatre stage play written, directed, and composed by Gackt, who acted in the lead role. The costume and artwork design was done by Clamp. It premiered on July 15, 2012, at Akasaka ACT Theatre in Tokyo, continued at Misono-za in Nagoya, at Assembly Hall in Fukuoka, at Umeda Arts Theater in Osaka, and ended with additional dates on October 2 at Tokyo International Forum, for a total of 60 shows. At several plays, with help of Ashinaga organization, orphans from the 2011 Tōhoku earthquake were invited and also received a monetary donation for scholarship. On July 12, 2013, a limited DVD recording of the "Chapter 1" was released.

On August 2, 2014, a novel was released by the same name as the theatre production. The sequel "Chapter 2" began its run on August 8, 2014, at Meiji-za in Tokyo and continued at Shin Kabukiza in Osaka, at NTK Hall Forest Hall in Nagoya, and at other halls and theaters around the country. The production run ended on October 31 at Omiya Sonic City Hall in Saitama, for a total of 40 shows. For the female character Hiyori, public auditions were held. In June 2015 was released limited DVD recording of the "Chapter 2". On March 9, 2016, was released the standard DVD edition.

== Moon saga ==
Conceptually, the story of "Moon" is separated in four chapters, roughly, first chapter from the year 700 to 1300, second from 1300 to 1600, third from 1600 to current time, and fourth from current time to future. The work from 2002 (Moon) and 2003 (Crescent, movie Moon Child, novel Moon Child Requiem) covered the fourth chapter, from 2005 (Diabolos) took place between the second and third chapter, while from 2012 to 2014 (theatre play and novel) and 2016 (Last Moon) depict the first chapter. The whole story is set in both Europe and Asia, depending on the story and meaning wanted to be expressed.

The story from the first chapter follows the "darkside inhabitants"—darts, who were scattered all over Europe, fighting for different countries even against fellow inhabitants. The second chapter described how they tried to make something that would surpass them and for purpose of fighting, so were created 13 "shitos" (使徒, apostle, disciple), but their bodies were incomplete and could not appear under the sun. From the third chapter, now known as "vampires", is followed their life. They didn't pursue their purpose of life, and as become aware of the darkness inside them, raises the question what is now purpose of their existence.

In the story vampires were presented as a way of expressing the reflection of humans. They long for immortality, believing it to be a wonderful thing, while vampires know how painful such an existence is and seek a peaceful death. The "Moon Saga" is a symbolic story about the repetition of human sins, war and the question of what is the ultimate meaning of human life. Regarding the theatre stage play, in The New Paper interview stated that nevertheless the reasons for fighting in the end remains sorrow, and that "in this century, a lot of countries are still fighting small wars. I would like to tell everyone that fighting is meaningless. We can find another way to resolve problems".

=== Mysteries of Yoshitsune I ===
The theatre play is set in the late Heian (794–1185) and early Kamakura period (1185–1333) in Japan. The main character is young adult Minamoto no Yoshitsune, from the Minamoto clan. Like previous chapters, it is a historical fiction, a world with supernatural powers and spirits (Mononokes). The idea was to create a story where the Oni (Japanese demons) were the origin of vampires, and eventually of the central character. In the Heian period existed those called as Mononoke (spirits), and Mononofu, who were born between humans and Mononoke, and with special powers dominated both Mononoke and humans. The story from Mysteries of Yoshitsune spreads out when the member with inherited blood crossed over to Europe, and became the progenitor of the later vampires.

In the first chapter, after the death of their father Minamoto no Yoshitomo, Minamoto no Yoshitsune and his half-brother Minamoto no Yoritomo were separated, and finally reunited. They peacefully lived in Kamakura. Yoshitsune was served with four companions, called as Four Heavenly Kings, Musashibō Benkei, Ise Saburo, and the Satō brothers Tsugunobu and Tadanobu, with whom had close relationship ties. By their side was Kage (Japanese word for "shadow"), a Mononoke whose life had been saved by Yoshitsune and had haunted him ever since, and his protege, Hiyori, as well Minamoto no Yoshinaka and female warrior Tomoe. However, some including Yoritomo's wife could not conceal their hatred toward Yoshitsune. Around that time, in his residence in Kamakura, Yoritomo was developing a strategy to wipe out the Taira clan, led by Taira no Koremori in the Hokuriku region, thus Yoritomo's vassal, Kajiwara Kagetoki, suggested a secret plan to Yoritomo that would also destroy Yoshitsune and the others’ peaceful lives. Because of Kagetoki's suggestion, Yoritomo granted an audience to Yoshinaka, who willingly departed due to his previous lack of recognition by Yoritomo, despite the opposition by Tomoe who warned him they will not return alive. Yoshitsune and his companions felt that these were the last days they would see the Moon together.

Yoshinaka recklessly marched with his 30,000 troops to the capital via Hokuriku, and managed to win against a Taira force of 100,000 in the Battle of Kurikara. Once again, he won in the following Battle of Shinohara, but no reinforcements or provisions arrived and thus, with the advice of Tomoe, resolved to advance on the capital with the remaining army. He succeeded and was awarded a rank by the Imperial Court. Yoritomo infuriated with the result, on a promise to send reinforcements, he sent Yoshinaka's army west from the capital to Mizushima in Bitchū Province. Yoshitsune and his army also headed into battle as follow-up reinforcements, believing that his brother Yoritomo wanted to help Yoshinaka. However, during the Battle of Mizushima the reinforcements did not arrive, instead Yoshinaka was informed that they had retreated. His army was crushed, while Tomoe was shot trying to protect Yoshinaka. His sorrow became rage, and decided to change his clan's name Minamoto to Kiso, and carry a revenge against the Minamoto's, as well exterminate all the evil ones and unite the world. His actions were regarded as treachery, and thus Yoritomo ordered Yoshitsune and his companions to destroy Yoshinaka.

Kage headed for Yoshinaka ahead of the others, but Yoshinaka already made a blood pact with a Mononoke named En, and thus En attacked Kage. Two Mononoke fought, which ended with Kage's sacrifice to finish En. Not knowing of Kage's death, Yoshitsune faced off against Yoshinaka. As Yoshinaka's heart could not be reached with words, Yoshinaka provoked him with his sword to fight, and when he was going to deliver the killing blow, the sleeping demon that dwelt deep within Yoshitsune's body was awakened, Yoshitsune's body flew into the air, and with his blades sliced Yoshinaka. Yoshinaka was mortally wounded, and being held by crying Yoshitsune, stated that Yoshitsune must inherit the clan's name and take control of this chaotic world. Although they understood each other, Yoshitsune kept calling his name in great grief.

== Track listing ==
All tracks are written by Gackt C.

Chapter I
No.	Title	Length
1.	"Shishi Funjin (Theme of Moon Saga I)"	4:08
2.	"Furin Kazan - Prologue"	1:37
3.	"Ikki Tousen - History"	1:43
4.	"Suiten Ippeki - Kamakura"	1:26
5.	"Kinshi Gyokuyou - Imperial Place"	1:42
6.	"Kousai Rikuri - Deep Forest"	3:34
7.	"Kenbou Jussu - Sorcery"	5:28
8.	"Chibou Hyakusyutsu - Psychic"	1:16
9.	"Hiyoku Renri - Soldier of Love"	2:59
10.	"Kogun Huntou - Battle of Mizushima"	2:05
11.	"Aibetsu Riku - Lost Angel"	2:29
12.	"Daigo Tettei - Oumi Province"	1:42
13.	"Haisuino Zin - Last Stand"	1:28
14.	"Kishin Kakusei - Fierce God"	1:35
15.	"Gekka Yasou - Sakazuki"	2:20
16.	"Setsugetsu Fuka - Epilogue"	5:22

Chapter II
No.	Title	Length
1.	"Shippu Doto (Theme of Moon Saga II)"	3:55
2.	"Oukou Shousou - Throne Room"	2:31
3.	"Kyoto Yashiki - Kyoto"	2:11
4.	"Sengun Manba - Heike's Army"	2:51
5.	"Ishin Denshin - Telepathy"	4:31
6.	"Shokan No Gi - Conspiracy"	3:48
7.	"Okuryo Rakugetsu - Fall of the Moon"	2:47
8.	"Anchu Mosaku - Thorny Path"	2:15
9.	"Shinten Dochi - Tense Atmosphere"	2:18
10.	"Ranbo Roseki - Run Amok"	1:17
11.	"Kanhouno Majiwari - Mind Reader"	2:50
12.	"Isshi Doujin - Brotherhood"	1:22
13.	"Kairyoku Ranshin - Monster"	1:40
14.	"Isshoku Sokuhatsu - Explosive Situation"	2:13
15.	"Shinten Douchi - Headache Attack"	2:59
16.	"Heike Houkai - Collapse"	2:55
17.	"Chibo Hyakushutsu - Intrigue"	2:19
18.	"Tesshin Sekicho - Arousal"	2:17
19.	"Rikisen Hunto - Fierce Battle"	3:44
20.	"Shimen Soka - Silence"	1:54
21.	"Ryuto Koto - Duel"	1:41
22.	"Eka Danpi - Decision"	1:43
23.	"Kien Kyoto - Darkness"	4:19
24.	"Esha Jori - Destiny"	2:32
25.	"Soshi Unjo - Again"	2:56
26.	"Kacho Fugetsu - Epilogue"	4:44
