= Samurai Warriors 3 =

2009 video game

- PAL territories cover featuring Yukimura Sanada (front) and Kai (back)
- Developer: Omega Force (Note: Additional work by Nintendo EAD on the Wii version.)
- Publishers: JP: Tecmo Koei; WW: Nintendo (Wii)
- Series: Samurai Warriors
- Platforms: Wii, PlayStation 3, PlayStation Portable
- Release: Wii: JP: December 3, 2009; EU: May 28, 2010; AU: June 10, 2010; NA: September 28, 2010; PlayStation 3: JP: February 10, 2011; PlayStation Portable: JP: February 16, 2012
- Genre: Hack and slash
- Modes: Single-player, multiplayer

Samurai Warriors 3 (Note: Japanese: 戦国無双3, Hepburn: Sengoku Musō 3) is a hack-and-slash video game developed by Omega Force and published by Tecmo Koei for the Wii. It is the third installment in the Samurai Warriors series. The game was released in Japan in December 2009 and internationally in 2010 by Nintendo.

Shigeru Miyamoto of Nintendo attended the game's Press Conference in 2009, to present a new mode in the game based on the Famicom Disk System game The Mysterious Murasame Castle. Versions for the PlayStation 3 and PlayStation Portable without this mode were released only in Japan.

A sequel, Samurai Warriors 4, was released in March 2014.

== Story ==
Like other games in the series, Samurai Warriors 3 reinvents the story based on the Sengoku period of Japan, a period where Japan was ruled by powerful daimyōs and where constant military conflict and much political intrigue happened that lasted from the middle of 16th century to the beginning of 17th century. The game, however, has a slightly extended time frame compared to the previous game; while Samurai Warriors 2 is mostly focused on the events leading to the great battle of Sekigahara, this game also covers the events beforehand.

== Gameplay ==
The game features many gameplay improvements over previous games in the series, the most notable being the addition of the Spirit Gauge, a gauge which allows for characters to cancel certain attacks to perform more powerful ones. These occur depending on the level of the gauge. It can also be combined with Musou attacks to perform an "True Musou". Certain combinations of attacks from the Xtreme Legends expansions also make a comeback. Each of the character's weapons are categorized under Normal, Speed, and Power types similar to Dynasty Warriors 6, except that each character still has unique weapons assigned to them.

The option to create/edit characters from the original game returns and is required to access the new "Historical Mode", which can be used to create an original story for edit characters by reenacting parts of historical battles. Both Story Mode and Free Mode return, as does the shop system, which has been redesigned and is now part of "Dojo", a section also dedicated to creating edit characters and color-edit existing characters. An exclusive mode for the Wii version is the "Murasame Castle" based on Nintendo's The Mysterious Murasame Castle, which allows for the control of its lead character Takamaru.

== Characters ==
Seven new characters made their playable debut in the Samurai Warriors franchise, most of them former generic non-player characters in past installments. Most of the characters from previous games also return, all redesigned with several receiving new weapons. Four characters; Goemon Ishikawa, Gracia, Musashi Miyamoto, and Kojiro Sasaki do not return, although Gracia later returns in the Moushouden expansion. Of all of them, seven characters do not have stories, though they are given stories in the Moushouden expansion. Altogether, there are 30 returning characters for a total of 37 characters in the game.

* Denotes characters added through expansion titles
** Denotes Takamaru only found in Samurai Warriors 3/Sengoku Musō 3: Mōshōden
Bold denotes default characters

SW	SW2	SW3
**Hanzō Hattori**	Gracia*	Aya*
Hideyoshi Toyotomi	**Ginchiyo Tachibana**	**Hanbei Takenaka**
Ina	Ieyasu Tokugawa	**Kai**
**Kenshin Uesugi**	**Kanetsugu Naoe**	**Kiyomasa Kato**
Keiji Maeda	Katsuie Shibata	Kanbei Kuroda
Kunoichi	Kotarō Fūma	Masanori Fukushima*
Magoichi Saika	Mitsunari Ishida	Motonari Mōri
Masamune Date	Motochika Chōsokabe	Muneshige Tachibana
Mitsuhide Akechi	Nagamasa Azai	Takamaru**
**Nobunaga Oda**	Nene	Ujiyasu Hōjō
Nō	Sakon Shima	
**Oichi**	Toshiie Maeda	
Okuni	Yoshihiro Shimazu	
Ranmaru Mori		
Shingen Takeda		
**Yukimura Sanada**		
Tadakatsu Honda		
Yoshimoto Imagawa		

== Bundles ==
Samurai Warriors 3 comes in three different variations: a stand-alone copy of the game, a Classic Controller Pro set, and a treasure box edition. The treasure box edition includes the controller as well as a mini figure, an original soundtrack CD and a book with strategies and artwork. The controller included in the latter two bundles is a special edition black Classic Controller Pro with the game's logo and Japanese inkbrush marks in gold.

== Music ==
JPop artist Gackt performs two theme songs for the game, "Zan" and "Setsugekka". The song "Zan" was used in the promotional commercials for the game, and is also featured in the game's ending. The single, titled "Setsugekka (The End of Silence)/Zan", which contains both songs, was released on December 9, 2009.

== Expansions ==
The game features three expansions/ports that either add new contents or expand on gameplay mechanics of the game.

=== Sengoku Musō 3: Mōshōden/Z ===
Sengoku Musō 3: Mōshōden is the first expansion of the game, released for the Wii in Japan on February 10, 2011. The game introduces two new modes, the "Original Career" mode which allows the opportunity to create original scenarios by completing missions and acquiring gold to increase the player's abilities and strength, as well as the series staple "Challenge" mode that has three challenges of varying objectives. It also adds new weapons, items, two new difficulty levels ("Novice" and "Expert") and stories for characters that did not have them in the original. The game also has online functionality which was not possible in the original. It was also released for the PlayStation 3 on the same day under the title of Sengoku Musō 3 Z. This version has updated graphics compared to the Wii, but removes the Murasame Castle mode and Takamaru. Both of these versions did not receive an overseas release.

=== Sengoku Musō 3: Empires ===
Sengoku Musō 3: Empires is the second expansion of the game, released for the PlayStation 3 in Japan on August 25, 2011. Like the other Empires expansion, the game is more focused on the political and tactical battle system. The game features a different version of Historical Mode and Free Mode that fits with the Empires structure and retains the edit character feature. Like Moushouden, this game was never released overseas.

=== Sengoku Musō 3 Z: Special ===
Sengoku Musō 3 Z: Special is a port for the PlayStation Portable released in Japan on February 16, 2012. As it is based on Sengoku Musō 3 Z, it has all of its features (including the removal of Murasame Castle mode and Takamaru) as well as the ability for four players to compete in the game's Challenge mode. Due to memory limitations however, the graphics have been significantly downgraded. This port did not receive an overseas release.

== Reception ==
Reception

Aggregate scores
Aggregator	Score
GameRankings	58.73%
Metacritic	55/100

Review scores
Publication	Score
Destructoid	8/10
GameRevolution	D+
GameSpot	4.5/10
IGN	3/10
Nintendo Life	8/10
Nintendo Power	6/10
Nintendo World Report	4.5/10
Official Nintendo Magazine	61%
VideoGamer.com	5/10

Samurai Warriors 3 was met with mixed to negative reception upon release; GameRankings gave it a score of 59%, while Metacritic gave it 55 out of 100.

== See also ==
- List of Samurai Warriors characters
