= P.S. I Love U (Gackt song) =

Single by Gackt

from the album Last Moon
- B-side: "Ride or Die"
- Released: February 12, 2014
- Recorded: 2013
- Genre: Progressive rock, pop rock
- Length: 18:56
- Label: G&Lovers
- Songwriter: Gackt C.
- Producer: Gackt

Gackt singles chronology
| "White Lovers" (2012) | "P.S. I Love U" (2014) | "Akatsukizukuyo (Day Breakers)" (2014) |

Music video
- "P.S. I Love U" on YouTube

"P.S. I Love U" is the forty-fourth single of Japanese recording artist Gackt, released on February 12, 2014. The title song was the theme song for Vartix brand commercial, while the B-side was the theme song for Kissmark snowboarding brand commercial.

== Overview ==
It is the first single in Gackt's career spanning more than fifteen years that didn't manage to enter the top ten of the Oricon major charts, it debuted at number twelve and charted for three weeks, however it did manage to top the Oricon indie charts.

It is his first record on his own new label G&Lovers, supported by record label and distribution company Crown Tokuma, and for digital release by Space Shower Music, being available for digital download in all major online stores all over the world.

The title song was written from a woman’s perspective, based on his own feelings and experiences, like the death of close friends Kami and Ken Ogata, but also inspired by stories and movies like If Only, the Japanese drama Ima Ai Ni Yukimasu (a.k.a. Be with You), and the film Watashi No Atama No Naka No Keshigomu (a.k.a. A Movement to Remember). Gackt recalls that the "single is meant to be like a letter left to a loved one by someone who's gone from this world", yet "the purpose of my song is not to evoke sadness, but happiness. In my opinion, death is not important—what's important is what kind of life we leave behind".

== Track listings and formats ==
All tracks are written by Gackt C.

CD (GLCD-00003)
| No. | Title | Length |
|---|---|---|
| 1. | "P.S. I Love U" |
| 2. | "Ride or Die" |
| 3. | "P.S. I Love U (Instrumental)" |
| 4. | "Ride or Die(Instrumental)" |

CD + DVD (GLCD-00002)
| No. | Title | Length |
|---|---|---|
| 1. | "P.S. I Love U (Music Video)" |

- Limited Edition (GLCD-00001)

== Charts ==
| Chart (2014) | Peak position |
|---|---|
| Oricon Weekly Singles | 12 |
| Oricon Indie Singles | 1 |
| Billboard Japan Hot 100 | 51 |
