= Last Song (Gackt song) =

Single by Gackt

from the album Crescent
- Released: November 12, 2003
- Genre: J-pop, Baroque Pop
- Length: 17:43
- Label: Nippon Crown
- Songwriter(s): Gackt C.
- Producer(s): Gackt

Gackt singles chronology
""Lu:na"/"Oasis"" (2003)	"Last Song" (2003)	"Kimi ni Aitakute" (2004)

Music video
- "Last Song" on YouTube

"Last Song" is a single released by Gackt on November 12, 2003 under Nippon Crown. It peaked at fifth place on the Oricon weekly chart and charted for 13 weeks. It was certified gold by RIAJ. An unplugged piano-only version was recorded, and music video filmed, for The Seventh Night: Unplugged.

== Track listing ==
No.	Title	Length
1.	"Last Song"	5:26
2.	"Solitary"	3:31
3.	"Last Song (Instrumental)"	5:25
4.	"Solitary (Instrumental)"	3:21
