= Trickster (Japanese TV series) =

Japanese anime television series

- Trickster: From Edogawa Ranpo's "The Boy Detectives Club"
- Key visual

TRICKSTER -江戸川乱歩「少年探偵団」より- (Trickster: Edogawa Ranpo "Shōnen Tantei-dan" Yori)
- Genre: Detective
- Manga
- Written by: Mantohihi Binta
- Published by: Kodansha
- Magazine: Magazine Special
- Original run: June 20, 2016 – January 20, 2017
- Volumes: 1
- Anime television series
- Directed by: Masahiro Mukai
- Produced by: Tomoki Iuchi; Koji Hirokawa; Chinatsu Matsui; Toshihiro Suzuki; Hiroshi Akio; Masayuki Sano; Yōhei Kisara; Masahiro Miyata; Kozo Misawa
- Written by: Erika Yoshida
- Music by: Yuki Hayashi
- Studio: TMS Entertainment; Shin-Ei Animation
- Licensed by: Crunchyroll (Note: In North America through Crunchyroll, LLC (formerly Funimation).)
- Original network: Tokyo MX, YTV, BS11
- English network: SEA: Aniplus Asia
- Original run: October 4, 2016 – March 27, 2017
- Episodes: 24
- Original video animation

Episode 00
- Written by: Gō Zappa; Takeshi Miyamoto
- Studio: TMS Entertainment; Shin-Ei Animation
- Released: December 22, 2016
- Runtime: 25 minutes each
- Episodes: 2

Trickster, full title known as Trickster: From Edogawa Ranpo's "The Boy Detectives Club" (Japanese: TRICKSTER -江戸川乱歩「少年探偵団」より-, Hepburn: Trickster: Edogawa Ranpo 'Shōnen Tantei-dan' Yori), is a 2016 Japanese anime television series produced by TMS Entertainment and Shin-Ei Animation. It is directed by Masahiro Mukai and written by Erika Yoshida, with original character designs by Peach-Pit, adapted character designs by Shinya Yamada and music by Yuki Hayashi. It began airing on October 4, 2016, on Tokyo MX and Yomiuri TV. A manga adaptation of the anime by Mantohihi Binta began its serialization on June 20, 2016. A prequel original video animation split into two parts, titled "Episode 00", was released on December 22, 2016.

== Plot ==
The story is set in 203X, and the «Shounen Tantei-Dan» (少年探偵団, Shōnen Tantei-Dan; «Boy Detectives Club») have been assembled under the mysterious detective Kogoro Akechi. Together, this group takes on cases both great and small. One of their junior members, Kensuke Hanasaki, is out solving a case one day when he happens upon Yoshio Kobayashi. Kobayashi, who has an undying body because of an "unidentifiable fog," wishes his own death and refuses contact with others. After seeing his abilities in action, Kensuke offers Yoshio a deal: join the Boy Detectives' Club and help them solve cases, and in exchange he will find a way to help Yoshio die.

The apathetic Yoshio accepts this deal begrudgingly, unaware of how different his life will become. Although he does not have much use for people, he gradually begins to acknowledge the group as he spends more time with them while solving cases.

The encounter between the two eventually leads them to the connection between the criminal nicknamed "Fiend with Twenty Faces" (Kaijin Nijuu Menso) and Kogoro Akechi.

== Characters ==
Yoshio Kobayashi (小林 芳雄, Kobayashi Yoshio)
Voiced by: Daiki Yamashita (Japanese); Austin Tindle (English)
One of the main characters. A mysterious boy with supernatural abilities, including immortality who seeks to die but is unable to do so. He's reluctantly recruited by Hanasaki as part of the Boy Detectives Club after Hanasaki takes an interest on him and after realizing that somehow, getting involved in their cases injures him where everything else fails. Although emotionally detached, blunt and indifferent of others at first, he begins to slowly grow a soft spot for the rest of the club, specially Hanasaki whom he wants to keep his promise to kill him one day.
It is theorized that the strength of his powers is inversely proportional to his desire to live, that is to say, his powers are at his strongest the least he values his own life, but weaken considerably the more he clings to life. His origins are revealed through a series of flashbacks. On them it is shown that Kobayashi, was born from a mother suffering from an Aggressive Autoimmune Disorder which had her heavily medicated. His father who knew that a pregnancy would tremendously debilitate her was against having a child. Nonetheless Kobayashi was born and his mother eventually succumbed to her illness. This causes Kobayashi's father to blame him for his wife's death and seeing no more reason in living, attempt to commit parricide, but Kobayashi's powers awoke and saved himself.
Kensuke Hanasaki (花崎 健介, Hanasaki Kensuke)
Voiced by: Ryōta Ōsaka (Japanese); Justin Briner (English)
One of the main characters. A hyperactive boy, he constantly seeks cases and adventures for thrill and has an easygoing and friendly demeanor. After he notices Kobayashi and his abilities he becomes interested on him and recruits him to the Boy Detectives Club, promising to kill him as they both discover that somehow getting involved in cases injures Kobayashi, although he secretly plots to make him wish to live. Contrary to his extroverted personality, he's revealed to feel alone and unloved as his rich adoptive father barely contacts him, and Haruhiko, his adoptive older brother, is missing.
Following an incident involving Haruhiko that was secretly plotted by Twenty Faces, he becomes emotionally scarred after Haruhiko voices his hatred for him and that Akechi had lied to him about his brother and distances himself from the group before being manipulated by Twenty Faces to follow him and get revenge on both his father and Akechi. Upon realizing he was in fact loved by both but never truly realizing it, he comes to deeply regret his actions and apologizes to Kobayashi, whom wants Hanasaki to keep his promise. He attends Rurino Academy but only actually goes once each month since he's actually excused from having classes there.
One month after his kidnapping, Hanasaki is currently experiencing stress and suffers from periodical vasovagal response leading him to experience subtle faints. He's also no longer an active member of the Boy Detectives Club as the previous incident has made the relationships of the club difficult.
Ryō Inoue (井上 了, Inoue Ryō)
Voiced by: Yuichiro Umehara (Japanese); J. Michael Tatum (English)
Akechi's right-hand man and the most senior member of the Boy Detectives Club. He was left paraplegic following a case he and a comrade worked on that caused beams of steel to fall on him. He's a strict and no-nonsense individual, but has a soft spot for the member of the club. He constantly clashes with Kobayashi over his lack of empathy but the two soften over time, albeit slightly. It's also shown that he really cares for Hanasaki, despite his regular behavior. During times when he is in peril he always takes it upon himself to protect him.
One month after Hanasaki's kidnapping, he currently heads Akechi's agency after Akechi leaves for unknown reasons, being told of his desires to disband the Club, which Inoue keeps from the rest of the club. During this time he treats Kobayashi considerably better than before.
Makoto Noro (野呂 誠, Noro Makoto)
Voiced by: Ibuki Kido (Japanese); Sarah Wiedenheft (English)
A member of the Boy Detectives Club and the sole female member of the group. She's a thorough shut-in girl who never leaves her department, and only checks events outside through her owl, with her speciality being communications and hacking. She claims to be the "most healthy" member of the group as she's constantly seen exercising with machines in her room while doing Detective Work. She checks on and remains friendly with Hanasaki despite Inoue's stance after Hanasaki's kidnapping.
She is revealed to be a college graduate who successfully skips several grades and a shut-in only because she finds comfort in home as she has no "dark history" as she puts it, and she pays her taxes accordingly, so she sees no problem in her current life-style (both her shut-in life and her detective work) and merely likes it that way.
Nao Nakamura (中村 奈緒, Nakamura Nao)
Voiced by: Azusa Tadokoro (Japanese); Jamie Marchi (English)
A corrupt police officer, and an acquaintance of Akechi. She has a business relationship with Akechi, allowing him free action in exchange of giving the police any credit for whatever case he solves. It is revealed that she is The Fiend With Twenty Faces's girlfriend and has been brainwashed by him.
Kogoro Akechi (明智 小五郎, Akechi Kogorō)
Voiced by: Daisuke Ono (Japanese); Eric Vale (English)
A famous detective and the leader and founder of the Boy Detectives Club. Akechi is a master detective with keen insight and deduction ability, but is mostly seen as laid back and lazy. Although born with a different name, he was adopted by a Detective named Akechi Kogorō who rescued him from his abusive biological father and raised him. Following his death at the hands of a criminal, Akechi names himself after his adoptive father and cuts all ties with his biological one. He eventually turned into a mercenary where he became partners and friends with the eventual Twenty Faces, becoming enemies for life after the latter has all of Akechi's comrades killed in order to monopolize him.
In the past a younger Hanasaki had "hired" Akechi to find his brother Haruhiko, which he succeeds on doing, but upon discovering he is on a miserable state and living with suspicious individuals, Akechi bans Haruhiko from ever approaching Hanasaki, while Akechi himself serves as another parental figure for the boy motivating him to be stronger on his own. After the incident with Haruhiko upon which Hanasaki discovers his brother's hatred for him and that Akechi himself lied to him the boy distances himself from the Detective Club and soon becomes swayed by Twenty Faces who acted as if Hanasaki was kidnapped. Akechi fully aware this is a trap decides to rescue Hanasaki on his own and confronts his longtime nemesis; however, he succeeds in escaping after Kobayashi spreads sleeping gas while Twenty Faces was protected through his mask.
One month following this event it is known that Akechi separated himself from his agency, leaving Inoue in charge for the time being. He appears again before the club, announcing its disbanding and leaves, demanding to not be followed.
The Fiend with Twenty Faces (怪人二十面相, Kaijin Nijuu Mensou)
Voiced by: Gackt (Japanese); Christopher Bevins (English)
The main antagonist of the series and a criminal mastermind, he's recurrently seen with a mask. A manipulative and intelligent man, he's behind several incidents that the Boy Detectives Club face. He is a former mercenary and companion of Akechi until Twenty Faces developed a twisted sense of love for him and had all of Akechi's companions killed in order to seek his attention, creating his current persona to in his words, give Akechi "thrills" to make him feel alive. He has a gunshot scar on his chest courtesy of Akechi, and orchestrates many crimes in order to provoke and torture Akechi on an emotional level.
He manipulates Hanasaki to his side after involving his older adoptive brother in a case, which ended with Hanasaki emotionally scarred at his brother's hatred and causing his distancing from the club, convincing him to seek revenge with Akechi together. Although he is able to torment Akechi his plans were stopped by all of the Boy Detectives' Club, but he manages to escape before Akechi is able to kill and disappears, taking an interest in Kobayashi. Although considered captured by the authorities during this event, it is shown that he used a dummy to fake his capture while he's currently hiding and planning his next scheme. He is revealed to have the power to put people under hypnosis by kissing them on the lips.
According to Gackt, the character maintains a feeling of emptiness and indifference toward what is good and evil, as well has a lack of human emotions. He noted that the public should reexamine the presumption that the work's title refers to the Fiend With Twenty Faces.
Masaharu Katsuta (勝田 雅治, Katsuta Masaharu)
Voiced by: Takuya Masumoto
A former member of the Boy Detectives Club. He was partnered with Inoue during the incident that left him paraplegic, and subsequently departs the club feeling himself unworthy of being a detective. He's a member of various clubs at his school and occasionally provides help to the Detectives' Club. He tries to convince Inoue to allow Hanasaki back into the Club despite Inoue's protests.
Hisashi Ōtomo (大友 久, Ōtomo Hisashi)
Voiced by: Makoto Furukawa (Japanese); Jerry Jewell (English)
A member of the Boy Detectives Club and their engineer as well as the founder of Rurino Academy's Scientific Experiment Club, he comes up with the multiple devices and gadgets that Hanasaki uses and is good friends with him. However while he shows a friendly demeanor to Hanasaki, deep down he doesn't forgive him for his actions during his kidnapping.
Tasuku Yamane (山根 たすく, Yamane Tasuku)
Voiced by: Yoshitaka Yamaya (Japanese); Jessie James Grelle (English)
A member of Rurino Academy's Scientific Experiment Club and a rather short boy. He's constantly teased by both Hanasaki and Otomo. He greatly admires Otomo and Inoue and aspires to be part of the Boy Detectives Club. He becomes an official member after solving his own case.
Hide (히데, Hide)
Voiced by: Kazuyuki Okitsu (Japanese); Orion Pitts (English)
He is the leader of a gang of self proclaimed "hooligans". During his younger years he spent some time in juvenile detention.
Narration
Voiced by: Tomokazu Sugita

== Production ==
The anime production, inspired from The Boy Detectives Club (1937) and The Fiend With Twenty Faces (1936) novels written by Edogawa Ranpo, was unveiled by TMS Entertainment on June 1, 2016, with the anime's official website listing the series' main staff, main cast, synopsis and broadcast dates. Along with the anime, the project will include a manga, stage play, and a live-action film adaptation.

== Broadcast ==
The series began airing on Tokyo MX at 1:05 am and Yomiuri TV at 1:59 am on October 4, 2016. It will later air on BS11 at 1:30 am on October 5, 2016. The anime's first opening theme song from episodes 1 to 12 is "Kimi Dake no Boku de Iru Kara" by Gackt, while the first ending theme song, titled "1Hope Sniper", is performed by Azusa Tadokoro. From episodes 13 to 24, the second opening theme song is "Unmei Jirenma" (運命ジレンマ; lit. 'Fate Dilemma') by Azusa Tadokoro, while the second ending theme song is "Tsumi no Keishō ~Original Sin~" (罪の継承～ORIGINAL SIN～; lit. 'Inheritance of Sin: Original Sin') by Gackt. It will be released across 8 Blu-ray home video release volumes, totalling 24 episodes. Crunchyroll streamed the series. Funimation premiered a simuldub on their website, starting with the first episode on November 3, 2016.

A prequel OVA written by Gō Zappa and Takeshi Miyamoto, titled "Episode 00", was released on December 22, 2016. The OVA consists of two parts with each part running for 25 minutes, totalling 50 minutes.

=== Episode list ===
No.	Official English title / Original Japanese title (Note: All English titles are taken from Crunchyroll.)	Original release date
1	"Mirage on D. Hill" "D Zaka Shinkirō" (D坂蜃気楼)	October 4, 2016 (Note: The series was listed to premiere at 25:05 on October 3, 2016; this is the same as 1:05 on October 4.)
In the year 203X, a security robot goes on a rampage in Shibuya. Nakamura Nao, a police detective with the public safety department, commissions detective Akechi Kogorou to solve the case but Akechi, along with Inoue Ryou of the Boy Detectives Club, is already heading toward Hinomoto Heavy Industries, the robot's manufacturer. Meanwhile, Hanasaki Kensuke of the Boy Detectives club is pursuing a lost dog after receiving a report from the club's technical whiz, Noro Makoto. As Hanasaki corners the dog in an abandoned building, he finds himself face-to-face with a mysterious boy.
2	"The Golden Tracker" "Kiniro no Tsuiseki Sha" (金色の追跡者)	October 11, 2016
A young woman approaches the Boy Detectives' Club and asks them to find the intended recipient of a series of threat letters her boyfriend made. They accept the job and begin to tail her boyfriend. Meanwhile, Kobayashi, after missing his chance to return Hanasaki's dropped wallet, uses it to buy a desperately needed meal. Hanasaki finds out by checking his electronic money usage history, and he convinces Kobayashi to join him on the current investigation in a second attempt to get him to join the club.
3	"The Hopeless on the Tower" "Tōjō no Mugyōsha" (塔上の無業者)	October 18, 2016
Kobayashi somehow feels that maybe he can die if he stays with Hanasaki, so he joins the Boy Detectives' Club. His first mission is to help find a jobless young man who's gone missing. The club starts by receiving files on missing persons from Detective Nakamura and her subordinate, Miyanishi, who are facing an investigation of their own now after a medical examiner went missing. They were all set to begin the search, but when the mysterious and socially awkward Kobayashi perpetually clashes with Inoue and Noro, he tries to make a run for it.
4	"Underground Labyrinth" "Chitei Meikyū" (地底迷宮)	October 25, 2016
After school, Inoue watches Katsuda of the tennis club practicing before heading home, and Hanasaki tests out some tools of the Boy Detectives' Club trade with Scientific Experiments Club members Ohtomo and Yamane. Meanwhile, a police car is found overturned after a crash. A film reel labeled "For Akechi-kun" is found in the car, and one of the passengers, Senior Officer Kanda, is missing. The film reel depicts Twenty Faces telling Akechi that if he can't find Kanda by 9:00 PM, the senior officer may lose his life.
5	"Spider's Thread" "Kumo no Ito" (蜘蛛の糸)	November 1, 2016
Kobayashi and Inoue are trapped in the underground discharge channels as a result of Twenty Faces' maneuvering, and a massive amount of water is pouring into their chamber. Worried about the police officers searching elsewhere in the channels, Inoue tells Kobayashi to escape with the message that the map they were given is fake and they need to evacuate immediately. However, the officers still end up trapped. Hanasaki rushes to rescue them and talks the former Boy Detectives' Club member Katsuda into helping him get to the scene faster. But as they're en route, more and more water surrounds Inoue.
6	"Holiday Stalker" "Yoka no Sanposha" (余暇の散歩者)	November 8, 2016
Hanasaki has been trying various things to help Kobayashi die, but nothing has worked. Then, while Akechi is away, Hanasaki takes the liberty of accepting six job requests. He's noticed that all the times Kobayashi has been injured were after completing a job, so he thinks that if they complete many jobs, his wish will come true but things don't go exactly as he planned.
7	"Pure Tryst" "Kegarenaki Ōse" (穢れなき逢瀬)	November 15, 2016
Akechi is relaxing at a spa to relieve the exhaustion of his recent cases. A story about the security robot incident, the organ-selling incident, and the underground waterway kidnapping incident come on the TV, discussing a "mysterious cooperant" who resolved them all. In other words, Akechi himself. Then Nakamura asks him about his history with Twenty Faces, and Akechi begins to recount the trauma of his youth. Meanwhile, Hanasaki also carries the weight of a checkered past, as he's summoned home by his father.
8	"Paradise in a Miniature Garden" "Hakoniwa no Rakuten Chi" (箱庭の楽天地)	November 22, 2016
The residents of the Kokorogaoka Housing Complex refuse to vacate their homes for the sake of urban development, so they declare its independence from Japan as an autonomous borough. The one to make this announcement is none other than Hanasaki's older brother, who ran away from home years ago. Hanasaki asks Akechi for help, but Akechi refuses to do any job he hasn't been hired for and confines Hanasaki to the building. Then a mysterious package arrives, and its contents reveal that Twenty Faces was the one behind these current events. Unable to wait around, Hanasaki heads for the housing complex himself.
9	"Fallen Hero" "Kanraku no Eiyū" (陥落の英雄)	November 29, 2016
Kensuke is bewildered when Haruhiko invites him to live together, but Isuzu is negotiating with the police for three billion yen in exchange for the removal of the residents of the housing complex. Meanwhile, Nakamura requests the aid of Akechi and the Boy Detectives' Club in the case.
10	"Innocent Scale" "Muku-naru Tenbin" (無垢なる天秤)	December 6, 2016
Hanasaki runs out of the office after an argument with Akechi and the others, only to end up confined by Twenty Faces and shown several video clips: Haruhiko in the hospital after surviving the gunshot, a girl who died when she didn't receive a needed organ transplant from the facility that the Boy Detectives' Club shut down, Hanasaki's father at a press conference for the opening of his new commercial complex and finally, the rest of the Boy Detectives' Club carrying on without him. These videos and Twenty Faces' words cut deeply into Hanasaki's psyche.
11	"Cruel Tool" "Zangyaku Odoke gu" (残虐戯具)	December 13, 2016
Hanasaki's act is successful in convincing Akechi and the Boy Detectives' Club that he was kidnapped by Twenty Faces. Akechi takes off to try to save him, saying he has an idea where Hanasaki might be. Kobayashi and the others are left behind, but Ohtomo gives them a hint as to where Akechi's gone, so they set out to track him down. Hanasaki is at Le Waqua, following Twenty Faces' instructions to take over the complex by controlling its security robots. Then Akechi arrives, and an epic shoot-out with the security robots unfolds.
12	"Shade by Haze" "Enmu Kageru" (煙霧陰る)	December 20, 2016
Even with a gun pointed at him, Hanasaki is brought to tears by the conversation between Twenty Faces and Akechi. Then the Boy Detectives' Club arrives on the scene. Inoue and Katsuda try to rescue the employees being held hostage by the security robots, while Noro and Ohtomo struggle to stop the robots. Kobayashi is stricken by an impulse he's never felt before and runs toward Hanasaki, but Twenty Faces had already seen all this coming and brainwashed the employees to turn on Inoue and Katsuda. He then declares that if Akechi kills Hanasaki, he'll make the employees stop and the whole thing will end.
13	"Nocturnal Dance" "Yakōjin, Ranbu" (夜光人、乱舞)	January 10, 2017
With the Le Waqua incident resolved and Twenty Faces in custody, the world appeared to be at peace again. However, the trauma of the incident left Hanasaki psychologically unstable, and the Boy Detectives' Club is reluctant to let him return to the ranks. Meanwhile, Inoue and the others are approached by Police Detective Miyanishi with a request to catch whoever is responsible for uploading candid photos of celebrities to a website called "Lynch Shot" without permission. The investigation begins, but Kobayashi can't help worrying about Hanasaki.
14	"The Spiral Ladder" "Rasen no Hashigo" (螺旋の梯子)	January 17, 2017
Yamane Tasuku, a younger member of the Scientific Experiments Club alongside Ohtomo, is troubled by three things. The first is that Ohtomo picks on him too much. The second is that he's always left behind in conversations. The third and most troubling of all is that he doesn't know how to become a member of the Boy Detectives' Club. One day Yumeko approaches him, mistaking him for a member of the club and asking him to investigate a case in which the school's most attractive boys are becoming victims of theft. But Yamane is so pleased by the mistake that he accepts the job.
15	"Beetle of Conviction" "Danzai no Kabutomushi" (断罪の甲虫)	January 24, 2017
After being out of touch for so long, Akechi calls the office. Kobayashi complains to him that Hanasaki is acting weird, and Akechi tells him, "do to him what he did to you." Then the Boy Detectives' Club receives an odd request: a death-row prisoner who's received a death threat has asked specifically for them to guard him when he's escorted to the district court. Inoue is reluctant, but Kobayashi, thinking that solving this case with Hanasaki will restore things to the way they were, accepts the job for them.
16	"The Beast Reborn" "Yomigaeru Kage Juu" (蘇る陰獣)	January 31, 2017
To escape the enemies targeting Fukiya, the death row prisoner they're guarding, the Boy Detectives' Club takes refuge in the abandoned building that Kobayashi had once been using as his base. They manage to hold their ground as they wait for a helicopter sent by Noro. In the meantime, Kobayashi has no choice but to play along with Fukiya's word association game, which causes his mental state to grow increasingly unstable. Meanwhile, Hanasaki, after being accepted into Hide-chan's Red Beetle gang, learns of their involvement in the case and has to make a choice.
17	"Scattered Recoil" "Risan no Handō" (離散の反動)	February 7, 2017
Kobayashi is in extreme pain after taking a gunshot. Has the mysterious power that protected him disappeared? Inoue is stunned by Akechi's prediction. Perhaps Kobayashi actually wants to live? Hanasaki is shaken at the sight of Kobayashi at death's door. Akechi gives advice on how to save him, but then reminds him that he was the one who made Kobayashi want to live, and tells him to do something about the situation himself before making another shocking declaration.
18	"Pure Evil Mistake" "Jun'aku Sakugo" (純悪錯誤)	February 14, 2017
Inoue and the other detectives are disheartened after being told that the Boy Detectives' Club would be disbanded. The strange air around Kobayashi has returned and is working hard to heal his wound. Around the same time, Akechi is recalling his past with Twenty Faces. During a time of war, when Akechi was a mercenary, he and Twenty Faces came through many vicious battles together... but he was growing bored of the thrills that Twenty Faces arranged for him. Then he met Fumiyo, a Japanese reporter, and the two of them were increasingly drawn to each other.
19	"Response to Malice" "Akui no Ōshū" (悪意の応酬)	February 21, 2017
As he's resting to recover from his gunshot wound, Kobayashi has an odd dream in which he sees a woman in a bed and a man approaching her. He doesn't recognize them, but the dream gives him a strange headache. Meanwhile, Hide-chan makes contact with Hanasaki, inviting him to help them punish someone who's been posting damaging information online under a pseudonym. But Hanasaki refuses, so Hide-chan leaves, saying there's too much to do and not enough time. His words make Hanasaki think about what it is he wants to do, and he sets off to visit Kobayashi.
20	"Fallen Clown" "Ochiyuku Dōkeshi" (堕ち行く道化師)	February 28, 2017
Kobayashi, along with Inoue, searches for the place that he saw in his dream. Hanasaki and Hide-chan then show up and offer to help. Shortly after, Kobayashi has a flashback after seeing gingko trees lining their path, then takes off running toward an abandoned building. Meanwhile, the police catch Akechi on the security cameras breaking the fake Twenty Faces out of prison. The police suspect Akechi is the real Twenty Faces, but Miyanishi disagrees and sets out to find the truth alone.
21	"Veracious Victim" "Katariki Ikenie" (語りき生贄)	March 7, 2017
Miyanishi was shot to death by Nakamura. During her interrogation, Nakamura testifies that Twenty Faces is actually Akechi. Determining that she may have been under his control, the police conduct a search of the Akechi Investigation Firm office. Hanasaki insists that Akechi can't be Twenty Faces, and Inoue demands proof, but the police ignore them, and the Boy Detectives' Club are reminded of their own powerlessness. Meanwhile, Akechi, now on the run, suspects there's something more behind this incident and starts looking for the truth.
22	"Small Moth Flying into a Flame" "Hi ni Iru Shō Mushi" (火にいる小虫)	March 14, 2017
Akechi, stunned to learn that Nakamura was brainwashed by Twenty Faces, ends up captured by the special security force. Meanwhile, at the New Tokyo World Fair, the plane built to carry people to the stratosphere is involved in a catastrophic crash. The Boy Detectives' Club is at a loss, and their attempts to reach Akechi fail. Then, suddenly, Twenty Faces appears on their monitor.
23	"Return of the Evening Star" (明星の蘇生)	March 21, 2017
The Boy Detectives' Club arrives at the Space Expo. Hanasaki and Kobayashi board the shuttle for the craft in the sky that Twenty Faces uses as his base, where Akechi is being held captive, but the shuttle is blown up and the two of them are held in place by security robots. Inoue and the others face off against the special security force, but they're at a disadvantage. Just when they thought all hope was lost, Ohtomo drills his way up from the ground in a vehicle being used as a Space Expo exhibit, but their relief is short-lived.
24	"The Boy Detectives Club" (少年の探偵団)	March 28, 2017
Hanasaki left Kobayashi behind and took off for Twenty Faces' hideout alone, planning to put an end to everything. But Kobayashi can't accept that, so he follows him... even though the aura surrounding him has already disappeared. Unaware of this, Hanasaki reaches the hideout and finds Akechi, but Twenty Faces also appears and warns him that the hideout will soon be destroyed. Hanasaki throws Akechi into an escape shuttle and turns toward Twenty Faces, with his finger on the trigger.

== Adaptations ==
=== Manga ===
Binta's manga adaptation began serialization in Kodansha's July 2016 issue of Magazine Special on June 20, 2016. The manga series has been compiled in one tankōbon volume as of October 2016; the first volume was released on October 17, 2016.

==== Volume list ====
No.	Release date	ISBN
1	October 17, 2016	978-4-06-395812-6
