= The Mysterious Murasame Castle =

1986 video game

- Japanese box art
- Developers: Nintendo R&D4; TRY
- Publisher: Nintendo
- Director: Minoru Maeda
- Producer: Keizo Kato
- Designers: Minoru Maeda; Kei Homna
- Composer: Koji Kondo
- Platforms: Family Computer Disk System, Game Boy Advance
- Release: Family Computer Disk System: JP: April 14, 1986; Game Boy Advance: JP: August 10, 2004
- Genre: Action-adventure
- Mode: Single-player

The Mysterious Murasame Castle (Note: Japanese: 謎の村雨城, Hepburn: Nazo no Murasame Jō) is a 1986 action-adventure game developed and published by Nintendo. It was originally released for the Family Computer Disk System exclusively in Japan as the second original game for the platform. The Mysterious Murasame Castle was later released worldwide on the Virtual Console in 2014 and for the Nintendo Classics service in 2023.

== Gameplay ==
The player controls Takamaru throughout the game.

The Mysterious Murasame Castle is an action-adventure game where the player controls Takamaru, a samurai who is tasked with traveling through four castles, consisting of Aosame Castle, Akasame Castle, Ryokusame Castle, and Momosame Castle, to obtain the four gems from the castle lords and reach the titular Murasame Castle to defeat the alien entity inside it. The player moves from different directions in a top-down view with no side-scrolling. The game only has a limited number of power-ups, forcing players to rely on their own action skills more than anything else.

The game world has scrolls scattered throughout the castles for Takamaru to collect, and special raccoon suits may reveal power-ups. Players are given a certain number of lives, and may gain additional lives by rescuing the castles' princesses and playing through bonus rounds after completing the first half of each level. One life is lost when Takamaru's health gauge runs out or if the time expires. When all lives are lost at any point, the game over screen will appear, in which the player can continue or save their progress.

The appearance of enemy characters (including samurai, ninja and hannya) borrows heavily from existing Japanese culture. Each level, divided into two parts: the path to the castle, and the castle itself, is of considerable size, and Takamaru must defeat generic enemy characters to reach the innermost region where the castle-lord resides.

The player's only weapons are a katana and shurikens; upgrades to the shuriken can be obtained, but are lost whenever Takamaru dies. The katana can only be used when Takamaru is close to an enemy or projectile (excluding fireballs), while the shurikens can only be used when he is further away. The katana can also be used to deflect projectiles. Other items include fireballs, which are more powerful than the shurikens; a lightning-themed explosive, which inflicts heavy damage to every enemy on screen; and a cloak, which makes Takamaru invisible and invulnerable to enemies and objects for a short period of time. When Takamaru reaches more than 99 lives, he becomes invincible.

== Plot ==
In Edo-period Japan, Murasame Castle houses a gigantic stone statue known as Murasame. The people lived peacefully until one stormy night, when a shining golden object fell onto the castle from the sky. Deafening shrieks arose from the castle, and the shining object is later revealed to be an alien creature who gives life to the stone statue Murasame and takes over the castle. The alien creature extends its power to four other neighboring castles, giving the daimyō lords each an evil sphere of power. The lords are taken over by the alien's evil power, and use the spheres to summon ninja armies and monsters to attack villagers. Hearing of these strange occurrences, the shogunate led by Tokugawa Ietsuna sends Takamaru, a samurai apprentice on a secret mission to investigate the castle. As Takamaru, the player must infiltrate the four castles to defeat each castle lord, before going on to face the alien entity itself.

== Development ==
TRY, who would later become Human Entertainment, helped develop the game for Nintendo, having done so with Pro Wrestling the same year.

== Release ==
The Mysterious Murasame Castle was released for the Famicom Disk System on April 14, 1986, in Japan. A one-shot television drama special of the same name was produced by Fuji Television in 1986 for the weekly series Monday Drama Land. The special featured a plot loosely based around that of the game, and starred Masaki Kyomoto alongside members of the all-girl J-Pop group Onyanko Club. The special was later released on DVD as part of a box set of other Monday Drama Land episodes in 2005.

The Mysterious Murasame Castle was ported to Game Boy Advance on August 10, 2004, as part of the Famicom Mini Series in Japan. It was released on Virtual Console in Japan for the Wii on August 19, 2008, and for the Wii U on July 30, 2014. The game was released outside Japan for the first time on the Nintendo 3DS Virtual Console in Europe and Australia in May 2014 and in North America in August. It was added to the Nintendo Classics service on October 31, 2023.

In June 2010, the game was featured amongst others from the Nintendo Entertainment System and Super NES as part of a tech demo called Classic Games at E3 2010.

== Reception ==
Reception

Review score
Publication	Score
Nintendo Life	8/10

Nintendo Life's Marcel van Duyn gave the 3DS Virtual Console re-release of The Mysterious Murasame Castle an 8/10, describing it as a fast-paced gameplay and high degree of difficulty.

Den of Geek rated The Mysterious Murasame Castle 3.5/5 for the release of the 3DS Virtual Console version in North America.

== Legacy ==
While The Mysterious Murasame Castle was never officially released outside Japan in its original form, homages to it have appeared in other media by Nintendo.

In the GameCube game Pikmin 2, one of the objects found in the game is The Mysterious Murasame Castle game disk. Takamaru appears as a supporting character in Captain Rainbow alongside a plethora of "forgotten" Nintendo characters. A microgame inspired by this game appeared in the Japanese version of WarioWare D.I.Y., which was replaced with a Pikmin microgame in non-Japanese versions. Takamaru (voiced by Hiroshi Okamoto in Japanese and Darrel Guilbeau in English) appears in Samurai Warriors 3 as a bonus character in the "Murasame Castle" mode; it is exclusive to the Wii release which was published worldwide by Nintendo. In the Wii U game Nintendo Land, the minigame Takamaru's Ninja Castle is based on The Mysterious Murasame Castle. In Super Mario Maker 2, the "Ninja Attack!" sound effect causes Takamaru and ninja enemies from the game to appear on-screen.

Goichi Suda, a former employee of developer Human Entertainment, expressed interest to remake the game for modern times. Hideki Kamiya also expressed interest in making a new installment.

=== Super Smash Bros. ===
In the Wii game Super Smash Bros. Brawl, a song titled "Nazo no Murasamejo - Douchuumen", based on the overworld theme heard before entering the castles, appears as an unlockable song for the Mario Bros. stage, along with Takamaru himself as one of the many unlockable stickers.

In Super Smash Bros. for Nintendo 3DS and Wii U, Takamaru appears as an Assist Trophy and is voiced by Tomokazu Sugita; when summoned, he uses his signature Multidirectional Pinwheel Knife Rook Attack. Takamaru was originally considered as a possible playable character for the game, but was cut because he was not recognized as much as other Nintendo characters. A remixed medley of music from his origin game, known as "The Myserious Murasame Castle Medley", can be played on the Duck Hunt stage. During a 2015 Super Smash Bros. for Nintendo 3DS and Wii U presentation, a downloadable Mii Fighter costume based on Takamaru for the Mii Swordfighter was revealed, and was later released in February 2016.

Takamaru's assist trophy and Mii costume return in Super Smash Bros. Ultimate, alongside both of the aforementioned music tracks. He also appears as a Spirit, one of the game's collectibles.
