= Lu:na/Oasis =

Single by Gackt
- Released: June 25, 2003
- Genre: Progressive rock, hard rock, alternative rock
- Length: 15:55
- Label: Nippon Crown
- Songwriter(s): Gackt C.
- Producer(s): Gackt

Gackt singles chronology
"Tsuki no Uta" (2003)	"Lu:na/Oasis" (2003)	"Last Song" (2003)

"Lu:na/Oasis" is a single released by Gackt on June 25, 2003 under Nippon Crown. Both songs are themes for the anime OVA New Fist of the North Star. The single peaked at fifth place on the Oricon weekly chart and charted for five weeks.

== Track listing ==
No.	Title	Length
1.	"Lu:na"	3:28
2.	"Oasis"	4:33
3.	"Lu:na (Instrumental)"	3:28
4.	"Oasis (Instrumental)"	4:26
