= Anime Current =

Anime television block on G4 Canada

Anime Current was an anime television block running on G4 Canada, in which one series is broadcast from beginning to end. It was similar to Anime Unleashed, a former programming block on the American version of G4. It premiered on 6 November 2006 with R.O.D the TV.

On 1 January 2007, G4techTV and Geneon Entertainment announced an exclusive deal in which Geneon titles would air on Anime Current. Previously, Geneon's first (and only) title that aired in Canada was Samurai Champloo on Razer's Kamikaze block.

On 25 June 2007, the channel announced the lineup would include six series, first being, Serial Experiments Lain, Texhnolyze, Last Exile, Tokyo Underground, Ergo Proxy, and Paranoia Agent. At the end of July 2008, Anime Current reappeared on the channel's schedule, but would finally shut down a few months later in November 2008.

== Series broadcast earlier ==
(In Order of date aired)

- R.O.D the TV
- Gad Guard
- Tenjho Tenge
- Gun Sword
- Trigun
- Lupin the Third Part II (First 52 episodes only)
- Serial Experiments Lain
- Paranoia Agent
- Texhnolyze
- Last Exile
- Tokyo Underground
- Ergo Proxy
- Requiem from the Darkness
- 3×3 Eyes
- Black Lagoon
- Transformers: Animated
- Ultraman series (Tiga, Cosmos, Nexus, Max, Mebius)

=== Series that never aired ===
- Daphne in the Brilliant Blue - Advertised as set to air once Lupin The 3rd Part II's 52-episode run concluded, the series never made it to air, most likely due to Geneon shutting down their North American operations.
