= Tsuki no Uta =

Single by Gackt

from the album Crescent
- Released: June 11, 2003
- Genre: Art rock, folk
- Length: 4:47
- Label: Nippon Crown
- Songwriter(s): Gackt C.
- Producer(s): Gackt

Gackt singles chronology
| "Kimi ga Oikaketa Yume" (2003) | "Tsuki no Uta" (2003) | "Lu:na/Oasis" (2003) |

"Tsuki no Uta" (月の詩) is a single released by Gackt on June 11, 2003 under Nippon Crown. It peaked at third place on the Oricon weekly chart and charted for seven weeks. The song "Tsuki no Uta" was used as the first ending theme for anime Texhnolyze. It was certified gold by RIAJ.

== Track listing ==
| No. | Title | Length |
|---|---|---|
| 1. | "Tsuki no Uta (月の詩)" | 4:58 |
| 2. | "Hoshi no Suna (星の砂)" | 4:32 |
| 3. | "Tsuki no Uta (月の詩) (Instrumental)" | 4:57 |
| 4. | "Hoshi no Suna (星の砂) (Instrumental)" | 4:24 |
