= Texhnolyze =

Anime television series

- First DVD volume cover, featuring Ichise
- Genre: Cyberpunk; Psychological thriller; Surrealism
- Anime television series
- Directed by: Hiroshi Hamasaki
- Produced by: Henry Gotō; Satoshi Shikata; Yasuyuki Ueda; Yoshimichi Murata
- Written by: Chiaki J. Konaka
- Music by: Keishi Urata; Hajime Mizoguchi
- Studio: Madhouse
- Licensed by: AUS: Universal/Sony; NA: Funimation; UK: MVM Films
- Original network: FNS (Fuji TV)
- English network: CA: G4techTV Canada (Anime Current); US: Encore Action (Animidnight), Funimation Channel, Funimation Channel on Demand; ZA: Animax
- Original run: April 17, 2003 – September 25, 2003
- Episodes: 22
- icon

Texhnolyze (stylized in all caps) (Note: The series' unconventional title follows the pronunciation /tɛkˈnoʊˌlaɪz/ (tek-NO-lize).) is a Japanese experimental anime television series animated by Madhouse and directed by Hiroshi Hamasaki. Set in the fictional city of Lux, the story focuses on Ichise, a stoic prize fighter who loses an arm and a leg after offending an unnamed figure. Written by Chiaki J. Konaka, with original character design by Yoshitoshi Abe, the series was produced by Yasuyuki Ueda and was broadcast on Fuji Television and its affiliates from April to September 2003.

== Plot ==
Lux, a crumbling underground city, survives solely through the mining of raffia—a rare mineral used in the creation of advanced prosthetics. Ichise, a disgraced pit fighter, loses an arm and leg after angering a powerful figure. Rescued from death by scientist Eriko "Doc" Kaneda, he undergoes texhnolyzation, receiving experimental prosthetic limbs containing traces of his deceased mother's DNA woven into their circuitry. Drawn into the city's power struggles, Ichise encounters three warring factions: the Organo crime syndicate that rules Lux, the revolutionary Salvation Union seeking to overthrow them, and the nomadic Raccan youths who weaponize their own prosthetic enhancements. His path crosses with Ran, a seer from the village of Gabe who glimpses possible futures, and Kazuho Yoshi, a surface-dweller who sows chaos among the factions to sustain his fading existence.

When Yoshi attempts to assassinate Onishi—the Organo's leader and Ichise's former mentor—Ichise kills him. The conflict escalates with the emergence of "The Class", an elitist group led by the grotesque Kano, a product of generations of inbreeding. Their biomechanical soldiers, the Shapes, begin conquering Lux as preparation for an assault on the surface world. Seeking to stop Kano, Ichise and Doc travel to the surface, discovering a desolate wasteland inhabited by "theonormals"—humans preserved by advanced technology but resigned to extinction. Records reveal that centuries earlier, surface society exiled its undesirables underground to build Lux. Overcome by despair at this revelation, Doc takes her own life.

Returning to Lux, Ichise finds the city in ruins. The Shapes, now immobilized and decaying, litter the streets as infrastructure fails. After mercy-killing his former ally Haruhiko Tooyama—now a tormented Shape—Ichise confronts Kano in the Opera House. The mad visionary, obsessed with forcibly evolving humanity, reveals Ran's suicide. In rage, Ichise beheads him. Mortally wounded on a rooftop as Lux's lights fade, Ichise's failing prosthetics briefly project Ran's crude drawing of a flower—their last connection. As darkness consumes the city, he dies with quiet acceptance.

== Characters ==
Ichise (櫟士)
Voiced by: Satoshi Haga (Japanese); Justin Gross (English)
Ichise is a largely silent and withdrawn individual. He is the son of a raffia mine worker named Ikuse, who was hanged for his crimes. He exhibits sporadic bursts of violence despite his typically passive demeanor. Initially introduced as an underground fighter, he gradually becomes entangled in Lux's factional conflicts while searching for purpose. His journey intertwines with the city's power struggles, though he remains an outsider to its political machinations. As events unfold, his actions—often driven by instinct rather than deliberation—influence the shifting balance of power in Lux.
Ran (蘭)
Voiced by: Shizuka Itō (Japanese); Carrie Savage (English)
Ran, a young child, is a seer from the neighboring city of Gabe. She is primarily seen selling orchids while wearing a white fox mask wherever she travels. Ran has the gift of foresight, which allows her to see glimpses of the future. Unfortunately, this ability often pains her, as she is unable to change the events of the future that she sees. She has an unexplained, but profound interest in Ichise, and throughout the series she appears to help guide him.
Eriko "Doc" Kaneda (鎌田江里子, Kaneda Eriko; ドク Doc)
Voiced by: Shizumi Niki (Japanese); Victoria Harwood (English)
Doc is a medical specialist from the mysterious Class, a group of elite individuals who live far away from Lux. She studies the process of texhnolyzation, the fictional technology that allows humans to control prosthetic limbs easily. She provides special prototype prosthetics for Ichise to replace his missing limbs, and follows him through the plot out of an interest in both him and the effects her experimental technology have on him.
Keigo Onishi (大西京呉, Onishi Keigo)
Voiced by: Hiroshi Tsuchida (Japanese); Patrick Seitz (English)
Onishi is the current chairman of the Organo, and claims to hear "the voice of the city" speak into his mind. He is characterized as a confident man with a clear belief in his own purpose and strong willpower, who is skilled in both combat and diplomacy. Throughout the story, Onishi attempts to maintain peace with the Salvation Union and stay loyal to his organization.
Shinji (シンジ)
Voiced by: Masaya Kitaide (Japanese); Jason C. Miller (English)
Shinji is the leader of the Raccan. A young, cocky man, Shinji seems to be the extent of what authority exists in the anarchistic Raccan. He often rails against the interference of the other two factions of Lux into the lives of his group, and harbors a particularly deep hatred for the Class.
Kazuho Yoshii (吉井一穂, Yoshii Kazuho)
Voiced by: Takashi Inoue (Japanese); Sam Riegel (English)
Yoshii is a mysterious visitor to the city of Lux, who is first seen descending a large, industrial staircase from an unknown location. Adventurous, charismatic, and purposeful, Yoshii's interactions with the citizens of Lux spark a series of changes that send the three factions vying for control of the society into a frenzy.

== Release ==
Texhnolyze aired for twenty episodes on Fuji Television from April 17 to September 25, 2003. Two un-aired episodes were included in the DVD release. Geneon USA's English dub of the series aired in the United States on STARZ!/Encore's Action channel in 2006, then aired again on Funimation Channel and Funimation Channel on Demand when Funimation licensed the series from Geneon Entertainment. It also aired in Canada on G4techTV Canada's Anime Current block in the mid-2000s. Its opening theme is "Guardian Angel" by the English band Juno Reactor. Japanese visual kei singer Gackt's song Tsuki no Uta was selected as its ending theme.

=== Episodes ===
No.	Title	Directed by	Written by	Original release date (Note: Fuji TV listed the series air dates on Wednesday at 27:28, which is effectively Thursday at 3:28 a.m. JST.)
1	"Stranger"	Hiroshi Hamasaki	Chiaki J. Konaka	April 17, 2003
In the dystopian underground city of Lux, entertainment fighter Ichise is forced into a sexual encounter with his promoter's lover in the city's ruling organization, the mafia-like Organo. After spurning the woman, his promoter finds out about this and Ichise runs away to try to escape retribution. However, the promoter locates him and chops off his arm. Meanwhile, Kazuho Yoshii descends from the legendary surface world and journeys toward Gabe, a community that was overthrown by the Organo. On his way there, he meets Ran, a mysterious young girl wearing a white fox mask, who takes him to see the sage. Shortly before reaching Gabe, they are attacked by members of an anti-texhnolyzation group called the Salvation Union.
2	"Forfeiture"	Hong Hun-pyo	Chiaki J. Konaka	April 24, 2003
When a maddened Ichise charges at his promoter's lover, his leg is severed as a consequence. Keigo Onishi, the head of the Organo, arrives at the scene but allows Ichise to live instead of shooting him to death. Ichise is able to crawl away into the streets, struggling to stay alive and sane. Meanwhile, the sage explains to Yoshii that Ran is a seer, able to look into an individual's near future. Yoshii discusses his motives with the sage for leaving the surface world, whether they could be good or bad. Later, Yoshii and Ran take a train to Lux, and he learns that she is a florist. Elsewhere, Onishi survives an assassination attempt by the Salvation Union.
3	"Texhnophile"	Yasuhiro Matsumura	Chiaki J. Konaka	May 1, 2003
Before arriving at Lux, Yoshii warns Ran not to reveal his future to anybody, including him. Ichise finds himself in a research laboratory, where Eriko "Doc" Kaneda is currently developing texhnolyzed prosthetic limbs for an operation. After his mother had died during an excavation, her body was stored as a substance known as raffia inside a container. Doc gives a nearly famished Ichise some water, and then shows his detached arm to show him that he has nowhere else to go. Onishi is confronted by an assassin of the Salvation Union after raffia, but shortly kills the assassin after being shot in his texhnolyzed leg. Doc reveals to Ichise that she used the raffia of his deceased mother as a biocircuit for the texhnolyzed limbs. Onishi knocks Ichise out before he tried to punch Doc in the face.
4	"Synapse"	Kō Matsuo	Chiaki J. Konaka	May 1, 2003
Doc explains to Ichise that a texhnolyzed prosthetic limb, after being molecularly and mechanically engineered, is linked through the nervous system targeting the cornea, thus preventing the user's body from rejecting it. Without his consent and by means of seduction, she surgically installs the texhnolyzed limbs into his body. Onishi goes to the headquarters of the Salvation Union to talk to Motoharu Kimata as well as Inui, the leader and subordinate of this group, concerning why he was nearly killed twice. During his investigation, Yoshii chases after two youths who stole his bag, but they try to shoot his head off when he loses track of them. As it is unveiled that Yoshii is texhnolyzed, Shinji, leader of the Racan, intervenes. After Ichise awakes, Doc tries to stop him from breaking his texhnolyzed limbs. However, when he figures out that they are painless, he leaves the research laboratory and wanders outside.
5	"Loiter"	Kazuhiro Ozawa	Shin Yoshida	May 15, 2003
Shinji claims that he has his own freedom, but Yoshii says that this freedom technically belongs to the city instead. Ran watches as Ichise struggles with his new body. Yoshii is taken to a brothel to see a pimp, who offers him to meet a woman named Mari to spend the night with him. She explains that a man at the brothel brutally scarred her body, ruining her chance of having any customers in the first place. Meanwhile, Ichise is later captured by Kyosuke Ishii, one of Onishi's subordinates, and dumped into a sewer. Ichise is trapped in a maze and he fails to find a way out. After Mari goes to sleep, Yoshii searches for the man at the brothel and shoots him point blank. After seeing flower petals falling into the sewer, Ichise manages to find his way out, but it seems that Ran had something to do with this.
6	"Repetition"	Hong Hun-pyo	Chiaki J. Konaka	May 22, 2003
Ichise is trying to get the hang of using his texhnolyzed limbs, successfully climbing a flight of stairs. Onishi summons Ishii to ask if he knows where Ichise is, but Ishii provides no useful information, much to Onishi's disappointment. After crashing her vehicle while looking for Ichise, Doc walks back with a broken heel to the research laboratory, only to see Yoshii there. Yoshii takes an interest in raffia, which he says is the reason for existence in the city. Ichise stops a youth from stealing merchandise from a shop owner, who serves him food as a reward. Soon after, Ichise finds Ishii and beats him up, but Ichise is soon knocked out and detained.
7	"Plot"	Yasuhiro Matsumura	Noboru Takagi	May 29, 2003
Doc fixes Ichise's texhnolyzed limbs and Onishi releases him. Yoshii meets with a man named Tatsuya Sakimura, a former surface dweller who came to Lux to work in railroad and is deemed dead in the surface world. He says that there has been much conflict between the Organo and the Salvation Union. Shinji tries to persuade Ichise to join the Racan, later bringing him and Ran to the hangout of the Racan. Later on, Yoshii finds Ishii in the streets and kills him. Onishi sends Nakahara from the executive board as his representative to confront Kimata. However, on the way to the headquarters of the Salvation Union, Nakahara is sniped by Yoshii, who Onishi is not familiar with. Because of this, the Organo declares war on the Salvation Union. Onishi receives a phone call from Yoshii, who says that he is too late, having set the headquarters on fire.
8	"Crucible"	Nanako Shimazaki	Noboru Takagi	June 5, 2003
While the Organo stalls to come up with a plan, the Salvation Union is preparing their retaliation. Yoshii crosses paths with Ichise and Ran in an alley. It is revealed that Yoshii planted a bomb inside the hangout, killing many members of the Racan. Onishi faces Kimata alone in the streets, but Shinji wants in on the action as well. When Ichise appears, he all of a sudden starts a riot between the Salvation Union and the Racan. Onishi jabs Shinji with the scabbard of his sword, and then takes Ichise back with him in his car. Yoshii was the underlying cause of covertly pitting the three factions against each other.
9	"Wiggle"	Kunitoshi Okajima	Shin Yoshida	June 12, 2003
While assistant Michiko Hirota is driving, Onishi barely escapes Yoshii's eye from a distance, avoiding shots from the sniper rifle being triggered. Ichise is taken back to the assistant of Onishi's apartment to rest. On the way to his office, Onishi runs outside and bumps into Haruhiko Toyama, who says that Keitarou Mizuno of the executive board is out to look for him. Onishi contacts his wife Mana Onishi from a bar to leave the apartment, but Yoshii gets to her first and points a gun to her head. When Yoshii tells Onishi that he wants him to be a part of a spectacle, Mana attacks Yoshii with scissors. Then, he kicks her back against the window, causing her to bleed and fall out of the apartment. Onishi finds Mana lying on the ground and brings her back to his room to have her rest in peace. Toyama calls Onishi, only to say that someone is visiting the Racan, which frustrates Onishi. While walking with Ran, Sakimura sees Yoshii who says that he is fed up with the unchanging nature of life in the city of Lux.
10	"Conclusion"	Hong Hun-pyo	Shin Yoshida	June 26, 2003
Yoshii, Ran and Sakimura take a train to visit Shinji at his hangout. Meanwhile, Bunken Kohakura joins Akihisa Sonoda in the sauna and discusses about what Mizuno is planning to do. Yoshii convinces Shinji to join him and support his mission. Onishi is attacked by 2 wandering Racan member on motorcycles but Onishi attacks them and interrogates them about where Shinji is and who is with him. Outside a cathedral from a distance, Yoshii prepares to assassinate Hirohisa Goto, a higher official to Onishi, who is meeting a representative of the Class, but Shinji catches on to what Yoshii has been doing all this time. Suddenly, Onishi comes into the picture and protects Goto from being shot. Yoshii goes after Onishi inside the cathedral and stabs him in the chest, nearly killing him. However, Ichise also arrives and punches Yoshii in the face, causing him to fall over a ledge. Sakimura arrives to find Yoshii laying mortally wounded on the ground. Sakimura makes a coup de grâce by shooting Yoshii on his head.
11	"Vagrant"	Toshiharu Sato	Noboru Takagi	July 3, 2003
Onishi is taken to the hospital and is thanked by Goto for his good deed. Ichise and Toyama are directed to a bar, where he gets to know that the bomber was a Masamune Factory worker named Sakazaki carrying a paper bag who was seen running away from the city's obelisk when it was bombed and was headed towards the factory. Toyama and Ichise go to the Masamune Factory to find out about the obelisk bomber, where Toyama's father works. Toyama is forced to sleep with his father after Toyama did not want Ichise to be the one doing it to obtain information about the bomber. Meanwhile, Mizuno visits Kimata and falsely uses Onishi's name to express his gratitude of compensation and support. He later visits Shinji and Hal to inform that he will be the new head of the Organo, but the two do not buy this one bit. When Ichise is attacked by men against the Organo, Toyama comes to save him. Toyama believes that being texhnolyzed signifies his hatred towards his father, Ikuse, who was falsely framed on illegal raffia sale and hanged. During an executive board meeting, Mizuno, insistent on becoming the head of the Organo, is shocked when the bomber, captured by Ichise and Toyama, rats him out as the one who ordered him to bomb the obelisk. After visiting Onishi in the hospital, Ichise finds Ran in the streets, where she tells him that she does not want to see everything anymore.
12	"Precognition"	Sayo Yamamoto	Chiaki J. Konaka	July 17, 2003
Toyama finally inducts Ichise into the Organo. Shinji and Hal discuss about where they will establish a new den for their group, much to Yoko Ryoko's annoyance. Kohakura informs Ichise and Toyama that the manager of an excavation named Yamura was found murdered. During the investigation, Toyama reveals that the Organo is kept alive through the Class by collecting raffia stored underground. After Toyama says that Yamura was illegally shipping raffia, he notices that Ran is trying to avoid him in the streets because she does not want to see his future. She collapses after envisioning men in blue fox masks surrounding Ichise. An old miner, offering a place for her to rest, is aware of Ichise's resentment towards his deceased father, but it was Ichise's father who was actually framed for illicitly selling raffia. After figuring out that neither the Salvation Union nor the Racan were responsible, Ichise and Toyama head to a gambling place, where Ichise spots those responsible for framing his father and brutally murders them with his bare fists.
13	"Vista"	Takuji Endō	Noboru Takagi	July 24, 2003
Ichise, Onishi, Michiko and Ishimori take a train from Lux to Gabe. Upon arrival, Onishi meets with the sage, who proclaims that Lux inevitably will first be destroyed and then be reborn. Ishimori tells Ichise that he does not necessarily have to be part of the Organo. Onishi, seeking advice, is brought in to speak with Ran, who predicts that he is in danger of being destroyed by the loss of his real legs, but she passes out before foretelling the overwhelming future of the city. Michiko tells Onishi that Ichise found an assassin in a nearby factory, which somehow supplies armed weapons. The assassin in the factory attacks Ichise, but Ishimori shoots him down. It is unveiled that Onishi sold his real legs as a child to a disabled boy as an act of kindness. Ishimori betrays the group and attempts to kill Onishi, but Ichise uses his texhnolyzed arm to shield Onishi, who then shoots Ishimori in the shoulder. Onishi is taken by surprise when the sage shows up with his tribe and breaks his ties with the Organo, and Ichise is distraught when Ran says that he will be the one to destroy everything.
14	"Rejection"	Hong Hun-pyo	Shin Yoshida	July 31, 2003
Two of Onishi's subordinates were killed by an unknown person and another subordinate Sonoda's office was destroyed through a drive-by. Doc goes to a mine that stores heaps of old texhnolyzed limbs for sale, but when she enters a shop for possible leads, she is harassed by the shop owner. Later, Onishi sends Ichise to see Doc at the research laboratory to fix his hand. Doc, having Ichise in tow, drives to her home outside the city limits, as she wants him to learn how to be sophisticated rather than violent. Upon arriving at the enclave of the Class at the end of a tunnel, Doc demands her leader to let her in so she can use her expertise in texhnolyzation, showing a magneto-optical disc which documented her research on Ichise. However, the only response she receives is a floating golden sphere which shoots laser beams at her, prompting Ichise to rescue her. Ultimately, her car is destroyed and her magneto-optical disc is shattered, as she and Ichise are forced to flee from the tunnel. Out in the ruins, Ichise takes down members of the Class who were sent after the two of them.
15	"Shapes"	Kazuya Komai	Kenji Konuta	August 14, 2003
During a memorial service, Kawamata, one of Kenichiro Tsujinaka's men, guns down a member of the Organo, which Kohakura kills Kawamata in response. After witnessing this event, Tsujinaka and Toyama wonder why there have been murders occurring recently within the Organo. Yoko goes out with Hal at the bar, but she is reluctant to see Shinji spending time with Michiko there. When Hal questions why Shinji is so special to her, Yoko leaves him. Onishi sends Ichise with Kohakura and Sonoda to visit Goto in the hospital, but they are ambushed by more of Tsujinaka's men. Kohakura and Sonoda kill all the men, escaping to an abandoned building, but the tables have turned when Kohakura shoots Sonoda in the head. Later, Kohakura has Toyama give Ichise a sword to assassinate Tsujinaka. Meanwhile, Onishi is momentarily subdued by Kano, the leader of the Class, who undermines the three factions and vows to change the city for good. Hal decides to resign from the Racan, and Shinji lets him go, much to Yoko's worry.
16	"Strain"	Nanako Shimazaki	Noboru Takagi	August 21, 2003
In Gabe, the sage must unquestionably accept Ran's predictions even at the cost of the lives of the other tribe members. Since Kimata has gone against the belief of anti-texhnolyzation, due to his left arm being discreetly texhnolyzed, Inui quits the Salvation Union. Onishi, upset that Doc had disappeared on him, lets her know that he encountered Kano, but without seeing his face. Doc says that the Class plans to get rid of her ideas of texhnolyzation to allow Kano to begin his revolution upon the city. In the hospital, Ichise visits Goto, who tells him to shape his own future rather than depending on the future that Ran has foretold. Kohakura declares the Organo to be disbanded during an executive board meeting, but Onishi convinces some of the members to go against the decision. The Shapes infiltrate the hospital and attack Ichise, who tries to protect Goto from harm. The Shapes are formed by people who left Racan and Salvation Union who were tired of their leaders' ideologies. All of their limbs are chopped off and completely texhnolyzed with only the head remaining live in a motorized robotic suit. When Ichise and Goto become surrounded, Onishi and his followers come to their rescue and mercilessly shoot the Shapes down. Kano sends a message to all texhnolyzed humans that Lux will now be governed by the Class under the security of the Shapes.
17	"Dependence"	Toshiharu Sato	Kenji Konuta	September 4, 2003
Onishi and his group fend off some of the oncoming Shapes that march into the city. Shinji briefly encounters Hal, revealed that Hal is among the Shapes, which leads Shinji to dissolve the Racan. Hal later comes back to settle matters with Shinji in a duel, but when Hal tries to finish Shinji off, Shinji impales Hal's eye socket with his texhnolyzed finger, killing him. Since texhnolyzation depends on cornea to avoid texhnolyzed organ rejection, Hal's body rejects the texhnolyzed limbs and dies. Ran takes a train to Lux for unknown reasons. Kano captures Kohakura and forces him to be one of the Shapes. Kimata, exposing his texhnolyzed arm to his fellow men, prepares them for the battle against the Shapes. Ichise goes to retrieve Doc, where she reveals that she lied about having stored his mother's raffia inside his texhnolyzed limbs, having done so to help him accept being texhnolyzed. Ichise is greatly angered by this and nearly kills Doc in a fit of rage but manages to stop himself. Onishi joins Kimata in the battle, but Kimata is shortly killed by the Shapes, prompting Onishi to retreat with his remaining allies.
18	"Throne"	Sayo Yamamoto	Shin Yoshida	September 11, 2003
Ran appears on a bridge in front of the obelisk overseeing Lux. Onishi and his group sneak underground to get past the Shapes that have raided his office. After burning Hal's body inside the den of the Racan, Shinji leaves Yoko to run an untold errand. Onishi leaves Michiko and Shinji leaves Yoko because they realize that the Shapes do not attack women and children. Doc, trying to persuade Ichise that the world is coming to an end, embraces him and tells him that they must leave Lux before it is too late. Onishi drives to the fortress of the Class, dodging obstacles along the way, and rendezvouses with Shinji there. The two are allowed inside the fortress, where they meet three grandmothers, who warn them that they need to stop Kano while they still have a chance. Sakimura finds Onishi and Shinji, who are aware of his association with Yoshii. Onishi sends Doc as well as Ichise to the surface world, with Sakimura as their guide, to warn them of Kano's impending invasion.
19	"Heavenward"	Masahiko Ohta	Noboru Takagi	Unaired
On their way to the surface world by train, Doc explains to Ichise that his texhnolyzed limbs will be greatly weakened in the surface world due to dependence on Lux's obelisk. She also confesses that she used her cells as a biocircuit for the texhnolyzed limbs, being the reason why she lied before. Upon entry, they discover that the world above is sparsely populated. Keiichi Saginuma, a male disembodied voice who then appears as a little girl, accompanies them to see the government office building, where Sakimura plans to resume his work with his coworker Yamashita. However, they learn that Saginuma is apathetic to the news of the invasion, commenting on how the production of raffia to utilize texhnolyzation has been rendered useless in the surface world. Both disappointed, Ichise and Doc wander the streets and find a classic movie theater, which shows a film depicting how Lux was created when the Class rounded up people who were thought to be imperfect or impure of thought, killing many and forcing the rest into the underground city.
20	"Hades"	Hong Hun-pyo	Chiaki J. Konaka	Unaired
In the apartment room they were staying in, Doc decides to remain in the surface world, while Ichise takes his leave. He goes to see an old man, who recharges his texhnolyzed limbs before leaving for the train station. However, he arrives to find the tunnel destroyed and Toyama, now one of the Shapes, confronts him. Toyama had intentionally destroyed the train and tunnel to stop Kano's invasion, but he goads Ichise into fighting him by telling him that Ran has been captured by Kano. They engage in a sword fight, which ends with Ichise beheading Toyama, who thanks Ichise for giving him a good fight just before he dies. Saginuma, showing his true form, later tells Ichise that the surface world is home to the theonormal, the remaining citizens who have resigned themselves to extinction. With the staircase shattered between the surface world and the underground city, Saginuma offers Ichise a chance to stay. However, Sakimura informs Ichise that he could still go through the airshaft, but before doing so, Ichise finds his father's ghost and expresses deep regret for wrongfully blaming him for his mother's death.
21	"Encephalopathy"	Nanako Shimazaki; Takayuki Hirao	Chiaki J. Konaka	September 18, 2003
Ichise struggles to return to Lux, encountering Goto in the factory outside of the city. On the way to the city by train, the latter begins to question his existence. Onishi saves Michiko from three men harassing her in a bar, but she begs him to kill her, having lost the will to live after being raped and brutalized. It is revealed that all those who are texhnolyzed are starting to have malfunctioning limbs. Shinji enters the fortress of the Class, killing many of the members before being shot himself by Zashi, Kano's informant, who then shoots himself in the head. Ran has displayed her visions to the people of Lux, which drive them mad. The obelisk, in the voice of Ran, speaks to Onishi, who is nearly driven to insanity, as the people have come to kill him. However, when he asks for her guidance, she suggests that he must kill her in order to stop living on with madness in body and soul. Meanwhile, Ichise finds a hallucination of Ran underground, saying that he came back for her to protect her since she has been looking after him all this time. Onishi stabs the obelisk and causes it to bleed.
22	"Myth"	Takuji Endō	Chiaki J. Konaka	September 25, 2003
Onishi is consequently murdered by the mob surrounding him, leaving nothing left but his texhnolyzed limbs. An enraged Ichise begins to beat the people to a bloody pulp, even when his texhnolyzed limbs seem to function without the source of the obelisk. All the Shapes have rooted to the ground and permanently immobilized, including Kohakura. At an abandoned opera house, Ichise finds Kano, who has failed in his attempt to use texhnolyzation to get people to evolve out of their violent ways, and now humanity's self-preserving bloodline has returned to its roots. Kano unveils that Ran, who has been turned into one of the Shapes, turned her mind off by her own will. Ichise begins to lose control at the sight of Ran. Kano warns that if he, the only sane person left, is killed, Ichise will be left to embrace his own madness, which then leads Ichise to punch Kano's head off in response. Ichise drops Ran's remains into the pool of raffia. He leans against a column, watching a projection of a simplistic rendering of one of Ran's flowers. Eventually, he slumps over and smiles as he and the city fade away.
