= Crescent (Gackt album) =

Studio album by Gackt
- Released: December 3, 2003
- Recorded: 2003 (Recording Studio); Burnish Stone Recording Studios; Prime Sound Studio Form; Pradise Studio; DLT Studio; Gajaya Studio
- Genre: Art rock, folk rock, progressive rock, alternative metal
- Length: 57:47
- Label: Nippon Crown
- Producer: Gackt

Gackt chronology
Moon (2002)	Crescent (2003)	The Sixth Day (2004)

Singles from Crescent
- 1. "Kimi ga Oikaketa Yume" Released: March 19, 2003; 2. "Tsuki no Uta" Released: June 11, 2003; 3. "Last Song" Released: November 12, 2003

Professional ratings
Review scores
Source	Rating
Sputnikmusic	4/5 stars

Crescent is the fourth full-length studio album released by Japanese solo artist Gackt on December 3, 2003. It is a concept album linked to its predecessor Moon and comes with booklets for both records (Moon did not originally contain one). Crescent also features a duet with L'Arc-en-Ciel vocalist Hyde for "Orenji no Taiyou" with whom Gackt co-starred in the 2003 movie Moon Child.

== Composition ==
Already established as a "charismatic vocalist representing the 21st century rock scene", Gackt continued to expand his expression, conceptualization and romanticism.

"Kimi ga Oikaketa Yume" is a fast-paced pop rock song, "Tsuki no Uta" an acoustic-strings atmospheric ballad, "Last Song" a dramatic ballad, while "Solitary" is an acoustic guitar ballad and "Hoshi no Suna" an emotional piano ballad.

Other songs are dramatic hard rock tunes "Dybbuk", "Mind Forest" (with Japanese traditional music influence), "Kimi Ga Matteiru Kara", "Lust for Blood", "White Eyes", while "Orenji no Taiyou" and "Birdcage" initially with acoustic guitar and strings become more intensely rock by the end.

== Release ==
In the third counting week of December the album reached number five on the Oricon charts, with sales of 75,561 copies. It charted for 11 weeks. Since its release the album has sold more than 250,000 copies, being not certified Gold due to change of criteria, but Platinum by the RIAJ.

Preceding the album release, were released three singles, "Kimi ga Oikaketa Yume", "Tsuki no Uta" and "Last Song". The first single "Kimi ga Oikaketa Yume" reached number two on the fifth counting week of March, with sales of 59,265 copies. In the upcoming two weeks, it was at number nineteen and twenty respectively, with sales of 15,010 and 9,234 copies. It charted for 10 weeks, and sold over 100,000 copies, certified Gold by the RIAJ.

The second single "Tsuki no Uta" reached number three on the fourth counting week of June, with sales of 49,952 copies. In the upcoming week, it was at the number eighteen, with sales of 10,267 copies. It charted for 7 weeks, and was certified Gold by the RIAJ. The third single "Last Song" reached number five on the fourth counting week of November, with sales of 40,745 copies. In the upcoming two weeks, it was at number fifteen and twenty respectively, with sales of 12,116 and 10,029 copies. It charted for 13 weeks, and was certified Gold by RIAJ.

== Track listing ==
All tracks are written by Gackt. C (except for track 12 with Hyde).

No.	Title	Length
1.	"Dybbuk"	3:28
2.	"Mind Forest"	4:25
3.	"Tsuki no Uta" (月(TSUKI)の(no)詩(UTA); "Song of the moon")	4:47
4.	"Kimi Ga Matteiru Kara" (君が待っているから; "Because You Are Waiting")	4:17
5.	"Solitary"	3:22
6.	"Hoshi no Suna" (星の砂; "Stardust")	4:23
7.	"Lust for Blood"	5:11
8.	"White Eyes"	3:45
9.	"Kimi ga Oikaketa Yume" (君が追いかけた夢 "A Dream You Chased")	4:21
10.	"Last Song"	5:19
11.	"Birdcage"	5:17
12.	"Orenji no Taiyou" (オレンジの太陽; "Orange Sun")	9:10

=== Notes ===
- "Tsuki no Uta" was written as the ending theme song for anime television series Texhnolyze. Throughout the liner notes, "TSUKI no UTA" is printed above the kanji for the song's title as furigana.
- "Kimi ga Matteiru Kara" was used as the ending theme song for the first movie in the Mobile Suit Zeta Gundam trilogy Heirs to the Stars, and was re-released as a B-side on Gackts single "Metamorphoze".
- "Mind Forest" was used in CM for video game Bujingai and as the ending theme song for the second Zeta Gundam movie "Lovers". The "Mind Forest English ver." was re-recorded by Gackt for the Yellow Fried Chickenz's European tour and was released on live album Attack Of The Yellow Fried Chickenz In Europe 2010 in 2011, while the official YFC version which also featured vocalist Jon was included in single "The End Of The Day" in 2011 and studio album Yellow Fried Chickenz I in 2012.
- "Dybbuk" was used as the second ending theme song for the third Zeta Gundam movie "Love is the Pulse of the Stars", and was re-released as a B-side on Gackts single "Love Letter".
- "Kimi ga Oikaketa Yume" was Wowow image song for European football.
- "Orenji no Taiyou" was theme song of the movie Moon Child.

== Album credits ==
Personnel

- Vocals, Piano: Gackt
- Guitar, Violin: You
- Guitar: Yukihiro “Chachamaru” Fujimura
- Drums: Toshiyuki Sugino
- Drums: Ryuichi Nishida
- Guest Voice: Hyde (by the courtesy of Ki/oon Records Inc.)
- Bass: Toshimi Nagai
- Bass: Ju-ken
- Bass: Kolchi Terasawa
- Bass: Jun
- Violin, Viola: Gen Ittetsu
- Cello: Masami Horisawa
- Contrabass: Jun Salto
- Keyboards & Orchestra arrangement: Shusei Tsukamoto

Production

- Producer: Gackt
- Associate Producer: Yukihiro “Chachamaru” Fujimura
- Executive Producer: Shigenori Nishino (Nippon Crown), You Harada (Museum Museum)
- Recorded & Mixed & Pro Tools Edited: Motonari Matsumoto
- Assistant Engineer: Michinori Sato (Burnish), Yoshitaka Ishigaki (Burnish), Chie Miyasaka (Burnish), Mitsuru Shibamoto (Prime Sound Studio Form), Satoshi Sasamoto (Prime Sound Studio Form), Katsuyuki Abe (Pradise Studio), Akinori Kaizaki (Pradise Studio), Taro Kuroda (DLT Studio)
- Recording Coordinator: Maki Iida (Burnish)
- Mastering Engineer: Yoichi Aikawa (Rolling Sound Mastering Studio)

Design

- Art direction, Design: Jun Misaki
- Photographer: Kenji Tsukagoshi
