= White Lovers (Shiawase na Toki) =

- CD only cover

Single by Gackt
- B-side: "One More Kiss"
- Released: December 19, 2012
- Recorded: 2012
- Genre: Rock
- Length: 5:45
- Label: HPQ, Gan-Shin
- Songwriter(s): Gackt C.
- Producer(s): Gackt

Gackt singles chronology
"Hakuro" (2012)	"White Lovers (Shiawase na Toki)" (2012)	"P.S. I Love U" (2014)

Music video
- "White Lovers (Shiawase na Toki)" on YouTube

"White Lovers (Shiawase na Toki)" (White Lovers -幸せなトキ-, subtitle lit. "White Lovers: Happy Times") is the forty-third single of Japanese solo artist Gackt, released on December 19, 2012. It was the theme song for Kissmark snowboarding brand commercial. The song was released by Gan-Shin in Europe in 2015.

== Track listings and formats ==
All tracks are written by Gackt C

CD (YICQ-10268)
No.	Title	Length
1.	"White Lovers (Shiawase na Toki) (White Lovers -幸せなトキ-)"
2.	"One More Kiss"
3.	"White Lovers (Shiawase na Toki) (Instrumental)"
4.	"One More Kiss (Instrumental)"

CD + DVD (YICQ-10267/B)
No.	Title	Length
1.	"White Lovers (Shiawase na Toki) (Music Film)"

== Charts ==
Oricon

Release	Provider(s)	Chart	Peak position	Sales total
December 19, 2012	Oricon	Weekly Singles	7	12,840
December 19, 2012	Oricon	Monthly Singles	34	—

Billboard Japan

Chart (2012)	Peak position
Billboard Japan Hot 100	11
