= Setsugekka (The End of Silence)/Zan =

"Setsugekka (The End of Silence) / Zan"
- CD only cover

Single by Gackt

from the album Last Moon
- Released: December 9, 2009
- Recorded: 2009
- Genre: Symphonic rock
- Label: Dears
- Songwriter(s): Gackt C.
- Producer(s): Gackt

Gackt singles chronology
"The Next Decade" (2009)	"Setsugekka (The End of Silence) / Zan" (2009)	"Stay the Ride Alive" (2010)

Alternative cover
- Dears only cover

"Setsugekka (The End of Silence)" / "Zan" (雪月花 -The end of silence-/斬～Zan～) is the thirty-sixth single of Japanese solo artist Gackt, released on December 9, 2009. Both sides are theme songs for the video game Samurai Warriors 3.

== Overview ==
With the single, Gackt collaborated with Koei on their new Wii game Samurai Warriors 3. The title song is the game's theme song, while "Zan" is the ending theme song. The songs were performed on March 6 and 7, in the festival at the Saitama Super Arena, organized by Koei to promote their new game.

The songs are distinctive for their blend of modern Western musical instruments and the traditional Japanese instruments, a kind of music called by Gackt as "Zipangu" rock, from which the country of origin (Japan) can be sensed.

It was the last single released by his own label Dears, supported by Nippon Crown, before transferred to Avex Group in 2010.

== Music video ==
Gackt choose three members from popular visual kei bands that were featured in the music video of single. These members are Ni-ya from Nightmare on bass, Tsukasa from D'espairsRay on drums and Shun from DuelJewel on guitar. You Kurosaki, from his supporting live band, filled the second guitarist spot.

== Track listing ==
No.	Title	Length
1.	"Setsugekka (The End of Silence) (雪月花-The end of silence-)"
2.	"Zan (斬～Zan～, lit. "Slash")"
3.	"Setsugekka (The End of Silence) (雪月花-The end of silence-) (instrumental)"
4.	"Zan (斬～Zan～) (instrumental)"

=== Notes ===
- "Setsugekka" (雪月花), while literally meaning "snow, moon, and flowers", comes from a poem by Bai Juyi and is used to describe serene beauty. "Setsugekka" is also the name of the white cultivar of the Okinawan Camellia sasanqua flower.

== Charts ==
Oricon sales chart

Release	Provider(s)	Chart	Peak position	Sales total
December 9, 2009	Oricon	Daily Singles	3	15,924
December 9, 2009	Oricon	Weekly Singles	4	24,742
December 9, 2009	Oricon	Monthly Singles	17	31,463

Billboard Japan

Chart (2009)	Peak position
Billboard Japan Hot 100	33
Billboard Japan Top Independent	1
