= Hakuro (song) =

- CD only cover

Single by Gackt
- B-side: "Jounetsu no Inazuma"
- Released: October 10, 2012
- Recorded: 2012
- Genre: Symphonic rock
- Length: 4:08
- Label: Avex Trax, Gan-Shin (EU)
- Songwriter(s): Gackt C.
- Producer(s): Gackt

Gackt singles chronology
| "Until The Last Day" (2012) | "Hakuro" (2012) | "White Lovers" (2012) |

"Hakuro" (白露-Hakuro-, lit. "White Dew") is the forty-second single of Japanese solo artist Gackt, released on October 10, 2012. It is the theme song for the drama Sengoku Basara. The title song was simultaneously released in Europe by Gan-Shin as a digital download on Amazon and other sites, but is not available on iTunes.

== Track listings and formats ==
All tracks are written by Gackt C

CD (YICQ-10251)
| No. | Title | Length |
|---|---|---|
| 1. | "Hakuro (白露-Hakuro-, White Dew) (Note: "Hakuro" in rōmaji, or "Báilù" in (pīnyīn), literally meaning "white dew", is the 15th solar term of East Asian calendar, in the Gregorian calendar usually begins on 7th September and ends around 23rd September.) - 4:08" | 4:08 |
| 2. | "Jounetsu no Inazuma (情熱のイナズマ, Inazuma's Passion)" | 3:58 |
| 3. | "Hakuro (Instrumental)" |
| 4. | "Jounetsu no Inazuma (Instrumental)" |

CD + DVD (YICQ-10250/B)
| No. | Title | Length |
|---|---|---|
| 1. | "Hakuro (Music Film)" |

== Charts ==
Oricon

| Release | Provider(s) | Chart | Peak position | Sales total |
|---|---|---|---|---|
| October 10, 2012 | Oricon | Weekly Singles | 6 | 13,192 |
| October 10, 2012 | Oricon | Monthly Singles | 30 | 16,214 |

Billboard Japan

| Chart (2012) | Peak position |
|---|---|
| Billboard Japan Hot 100 | 12 |
