= Moon Child (2003 film) =

- Theatrical release poster
- Directed by: Takahisa Zeze
- Written by: Gackt; Kishu Izuchi; Takahisa Zeze
- Produced by: Takashi Hirano
- Starring: Gackt; Hyde; Leehom Wang; Tarō Yamamoto; Susumu Terajima; Zeny Kwok; Anne Suzuki; James Houston Thomas; Kanata Hongō
- Cinematography: Takahide Shibanushi
- Music by: Gackt
- Distributed by: Shochiku
- Release date: April 19, 2003
- Running time: 120 minutes
- Languages: Japanese; Mandarin; Cantonese; English
- Box office: $3,713,831

Moon Child is a 2003 Japanese science fantasy horror action film starring Gackt, Hyde, and Leehom Wang. It was released on April 19 in Japan, and screened on May 13 at the Cannes Film Festival and on April 12, 2004, at Philadelphia Film Festival. In November 2023 for its 20th anniversary it was re-screened nationwide in Japan. The movie's story is adaptation of Gackt's original story related to his "Moon Saga" concept. Although the original story is about a vampire and his friends, it "reverses the concept of marginalised Asians living illegally in Japan to that of a group of marginalised Japanese renegades hiding out in a fictional futuristic city on the Asian mainland, named Maleppa, following Japan's economic collapse in the opening decades of the 21st Century".

== Plot ==
In the year 2014, Japan suffers a major economic collapse and people are forced to emigrate to mainland China. The movie introduced the story with two vampires, Kei and Luka, of whom the first was probably made a vampire by the former, and in later Kei's flashback is revealed that Luka decided to end his existence by watching the sunrise. Three orphaned boys live in a fictional Chinese city called Mallepa, a 'melting pot' of different Asian groups. They are named Shō, Shinji who is Sho's brother, and Toshi. All three survive through pickpocketing. During a theft gone wrong, Sho meets Kei - a vampire who appears to be a young man - sitting amidst a pile of debris and brings him back to the orphan's hideout. When the orphans are attacked by a man they previously robbed, Kei attacks, kills, and feeds off of their attacker, thereby revealing his status as a vampire to the orphans. However, Sho approaches him, unafraid.

Several years later, Sho is in his twenties, leading a band of thieves consisting of Kei and Toshi. During one of the robberies against another gang, they cross paths with a Taiwanese named Son. Son is going after the gang because their leader raped his sister, Yi-Che. Sho, Kei, Son and Toshi all become friends, and Sho quickly and awkwardly falls in love with Yi-Che though it is implied that she in turn harbors feelings for Kei. Toshi is murdered by the local mafia for helping Sho and Kei in their heists by using drugged pizza to sedate their targets. Soon, through this experience, Son and Yi-Che learn that Kei is a vampire.

Nine years later, Kei has left the band and Sho is head of his district in Mallepa and is married to Yi-Che. Son has joined Mr. Chan, the leader of the opposing mafia of Mallepa and is now Sho's enemy. Kei, who is revealed to be in prison for murder, makes several death sentence pleas; Sho goes to visit him in prison after seeing a news report about him on TV. During Sho's visit at the prison, he reveals to Kei that he had to propose to Yi-Che several times before she agreed because she was really in love with Kei. The couple now have a daughter together whom they named "Hana". After spending the entire conversation in silence, Kei states that he feared Sho, who had been reckless, was dead and that he is glad he is not.

Yi-Che develops a fatal cancerous brain tumor. Soon after the diagnosis, Sho's men are killed on the streets in broad daylight while Sho is away. Sho's brother, Shinji, is also killed when he points at gun at Mr. Chan while in a drug induced haze. Sho calls Kei and begs him to return. After speaking to Kei he is told that Kei had been sentenced to death, something Kei had actually requested. Kei, however, escapes his execution and returns to help his friend. Sho asks Kei to turn Yi-Che into a vampire so she will be around for the sake of Hana (their young daughter). Kei refuses angrily, but agrees to face Mr. Chan with Sho. He promises Sho that if anything happens to him, he will take care of Hana.

When they go to face Mr. Chan, Mr. Chan is shot by two of his own while Sho faces off with Son. Their battle comes down to a 'count to three and shoot' match when they are both down to only one bullet. Sho's gun misfires and he is shot in the chest by Son. Kei arrives on the scene and Son faces his own death by pointing his empty gun at Kei, who is enraged at the sight of his injured friend and fires at Son. Kei goes to Sho, who appears to die dramatically in Kei's arms.

In 2045, Hana is grown up and heading off to college. She says goodbye to Kei, who raised her in Sho's absence and it is implied that she is aware of Kei being a vampire. Before she leaves she mentions the feeling of someone watching her, and after her departure Sho appears as a vampire, thanking Kei for taking care of her all these years because he couldn't face what he had become. Together the two men drive to the beach and await the rising sun together to face death. The movie concludes with the entire gang back together at the beach in the daylight (something not possible for Kei in the past), presumably reunited in the afterlife or as reincarnations of themselves in another life.

== Cast ==
- Gackt as Shō
  - Kanata Hongō as young Shō
- Hyde as Kei
- Leehom Wang as Son
- Tarō Yamamoto as Toshi
- Susumu Terajima as Shinji
- Zeny Kwok as Yi-Che
- Anne Suzuki as Hana
- James Houston Thomas as Rick
- Ryo Ishibashi
- Jack Kao
- You Kurosaki as Jun
- Etsushi Toyokawa as Luka

== Theme song ==
The theme song for the movie is "Orange no Taiyō" (オレンジの太陽, Orenji no Taiyō; "The Orange Sun"), a duet written and performed by Gackt and Hyde. The lyrics are continuously recited throughout the movie. The song was released in Gackt's studio album Crescent (2003).

== Critical reception ==
Derek Elley of Variety called Moon Child "A half-chaotic, half-entertaining mixture of dystopian romance, gunplay and vampirism, [the film] is a futuristic fantasy-on-a-budget that, like most of Japanese helmer Takahisa Zeze's pics, would benefit from a further 30 minutes left on the cutting-room floor".

According to Jasper Sharp of Midnight Eye, "Moon Child proves for the first time that Zeze has the technical ability both to handle large-scale action sequences, and to create elaborate comic book fantasy worlds. But the film is all flames and no fire, and there remains a lingering suspicion that the director is not quite in control of the material".

== See also ==
- Moon
- Crescent
- Vampire film
