= Gackt discography =

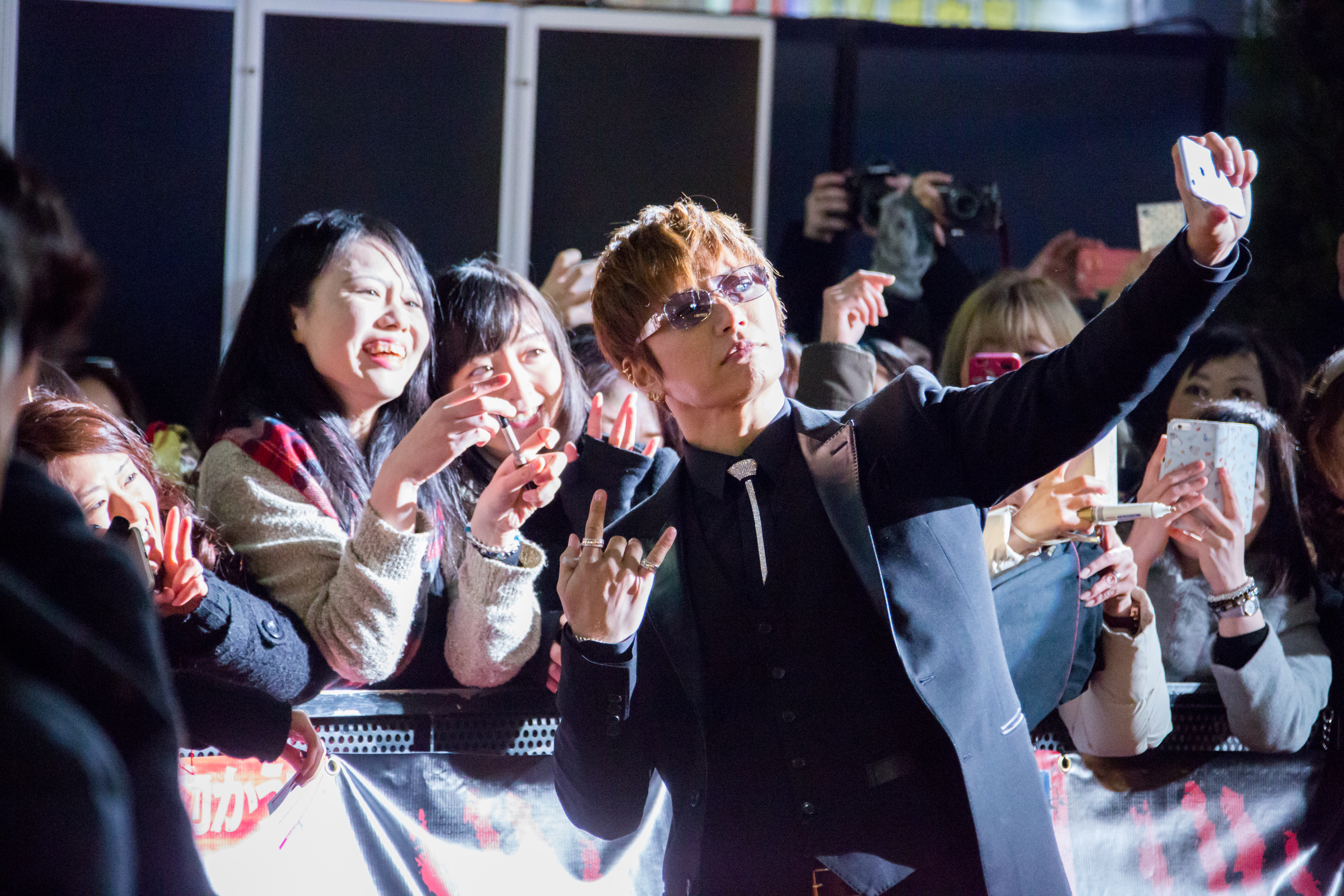
- Gackt at the Japanese red carpet premiere of Kong: Skull Island in 2017.
- Studio albums: 8
- Extended plays: 1
- Soundtrack albums: 2
- Live albums: 10
- Compilation albums: 8
- Singles: 50

The discography of Japanese recording artist Gackt consists of eight studio albums, eight compilation albums, one extended play, and forty-eight singles. In 1999 Gackt signed a recording contract with Nippon Crown. His breakthrough success was the EP Mizérable, which peaked at number 2 on the Oricon albums chart. His single "Returner (Yami no Shūen)", released on June 20, 2007, was his first and only single to reach the number one spot on the Oricon charts to date. In 2007, his entire back catalogue, with live song recordings from Drug Party tour, was released on the iTunes Store, video collection "The Greatest Filmography" was released in the United States and Canada, and his album Diabolos was released in 18 European countries. From November 2008 until March 2010 his records were released under his own independent label Dears, but still supported by Nippon Crown. In April 2010, Gackt transferred to Avex Group. Since February 2014 they're released by his independent record label G&Lovers, which is supported by Crown Tokuma. As a solo artist, since 2009 are reported sales of over 10 million, and holds the male soloist record for most top ten consecutive chart singles as of July 18, 2011.

== Discography ==
=== Studio albums ===
| Year | Title (information) | Oricon chart | Sales (Japan) | RIAJ certification (sales thresholds) |
| Year | Title (information) | Weekly | Sales (Japan) | RIAJ certification (sales thresholds) |
|---|---|---|---|---|
| 1999 | Mizérable (extended play): Released: May 12, 1999; Label: Nippon Crown | 2 | 252,670 (95th, 1999) | — |
| 2000 | Mars: Released: April 26, 2000; Label: Nippon Crown | 3 | 200,000 | Gold |
| 2001 | Rebirth: Released: April 25, 2001; Label: Nippon Crown | 3 | 214,220 (100th, 2001) | — |
| 2002 | Moon: Released: June 19, 2002; Label: Nippon Crown | 2 | 281,590 (67th, 2002) | Gold |
| 2003 | Crescent: Released: December 3, 2003; Label: Nippon Crown | 5 | 250,000 | Platinum |
| 2005 | Love Letter: Released: February 14, 2005; Label: Nippon Crown | 5 | 120,000 | Gold |
| 2005 | Diabolos: Released: September 21, 2005; Label: Nippon Crown | 4 | 100,000 | Gold |
| 2009 | Re:Born: Released: December 2, 2009; Label: Dears (Nippon Crown) | 9 | 50,000 | — |
| 2016 | Last Moon: Released: April 27, 2016; Label: G&Lovers | 6 | — | — |

Footnotes:

- — = N/A

=== Live albums ===
| Year | Title |
|---|---|
| 2007 | Gackt Training Days 2006 Drug Party (Drug I Version) [Live]: Released: July 4, 2007; Label: Nippon Crown (digital download) |
| 2008 | nine*nine (7 live albums incl. Drug Party): Released: October 29, 2008 (originally), March 12, 2025 (distributed); Label: Nippon Crown (digital download, streaming) |
| 2014 | Gackt & Tokyo Philharmonic Orchestra: "A Splendid Evening of Classic" (Live): Released: October 15, 2014; Label: G&Lovers (digital download) |
| 2018 | Gackt's -45th Birthday Concert- Last Songs: Released: December 24, 2018; Label: G&Lovers (digital download) |
| 2025 | Gackt Philharmonic 2025 - Demonic Philharmony (Live at Sumida Trifony Hall, Tokyo 2025): Released: July 4, 2025; Label: Universal Classics and Jazz (CD, digital download) |

=== Compilation albums ===
| Year | Title (information) | Oricon chart | Sales (Japan) | RIAJ certification (sales thresholds) |
| Year | Title (information) | Weekly | Sales (Japan) | RIAJ certification (sales thresholds) |
|---|---|---|---|---|
| 2004 | The Sixth Day: Single Collection: Released: February 25, 2004; Label: Nippon Crown | 3 | 200,000 (78th, 2004) | Platinum |
| 2004 | The Seventh Night: Unplugged: Released: May 26, 2004; Label: Nippon Crown | 5 | 100,000 | Gold |
| 2006 | Jūnigatsu no Love Song: Complete Box: Released: December 13, 2006; Label: Nippon Crown; Limited edition | 50 | — | — |
| 2007 | 0079–0088: Released: December 19, 2007; Label: Nippon Crown | 6 | 70,000 | — |
| 2010 | Are You "Fried Chickenz"??: Released: June 23, 2010; Label: Nippon Crown | 10 | 22,000 | — |
| 2010 | The Eleventh Day: Single Collection: Released: July 21, 2010; Label: Nippon Crown | 7 | 20,000 | — |
| 2013 | Best of the Best: Mild: Released: July 3, 2013; Label: Avex Trax | 8 | 20,000 | — |
| 2013 | Best of the Best: Wild: Released: July 3, 2013; Label: Avex Trax | 9 | 20,000 | — |

=== Remix albums ===
| Year | Title |
|---|---|
| 2015 | Gacktracks -Ultra DJ ReMix-: Released: July 1, 2015; Label: G&Lovers |

=== Soundtrack ===
| Year | Title |
|---|---|
| 2009 | Slo-Pachinko Gladiator Evolution: Released: March 9, 2009; Label: Dears (Nippon Crown); Limited edition |
| 2014 | Mysteries of Yoshitsune I&II: Released: October 1, 2014; Label: G&Lovers |

=== Singles ===
| Year | Title (information) | Oricon chart | RIAJ certification (sales thresholds) | Sales (Japan) | Album |
| Year | Title (information) | Weekly | RIAJ certification (sales thresholds) | Sales (Japan) | Album |
|---|---|---|---|---|---|
| 1999 | "Mizérable" (Single box, with CD+VHS) | 3 | — | 116,771 | Mizérable |
| 1999 | "Mizérable" (CD single) | 72 | — | — | Mizérable |
| 1999 | "Vanilla" | 4 | Gold | 248,360 (89th, 1999) | Mars |
| 1999 | "Remix of Gackt" | 13 | — | 35,000 | — |
| 2000 | "Mirror" | 9 | — | 116,000 | Mars |
| 2000 | "Oasis" | 7 | — | 126,280 | Mars |
| 2000 | "Seki-Ray" | 7 | — | 108,000 | Rebirth |
| 2000 | "Saikai (Story)" | 7 | — | 91,000 | — |
| 2000 | "Secret Garden" | 10 | — | 83,000 | Rebirth |
| 2001 | "Kimi no Tameni Dekiru Koto" | 6 | — | 146,770 | Rebirth |
| 2001 | "Another World" | 2 | — | 284,550 (74th, 2001) | Moon |
| 2001 | "Jūnigatsu no Love Song" | 5 | — | 171,822 (73rd, 2002) | Jūnigatsu no Love Song: Complete Box |
| 2002 | "Vanilla" (re-release) | 12 | — | 25,000 | Mars |
| 2002 | "Wasurenai Kara" | 4 | — | 132,260 (98th, 2002) | Moon |
| 2002 | "Jūnigatsu no Love Song" (English) | 5 | — | 82,000 | Jūnigatsu no Love Song: Complete Box |
| 2003 | "Kimi ga Oikaketa Yume" | 2 | Gold | 100,000 | Crescent |
| 2003 | "Tsuki no Uta" | 3 | Gold | 100,000 | Crescent |
| 2003 | "Lu:na/Oasis" | 5 | — | 34,000 | Moon, Mars |
| 2003 | "Last Song" | 5 | Gold | 100,000 | Crescent |
| 2003 | "Jūnigatsu no Love Song" (Chinese) | 6 | — | 51,000 | Jūnigatsu no Love Song: Complete Box |
| 2004 | "Kimi ni Aitakute" | 2 | Gold | 124,432 (96th, 2004) | Love Letter |
| 2004 | "Jūnigatsu no Love Song" (Korean) | 8 | — | 36,000 | Jūnigatsu no Love Song: Complete Box |
| 2005 | "Arittake no Ai de" | 7 | — | 62,000 | Love Letter |
| 2005 | "Black Stone" | 3 | Gold | 100,000 | Diabolos |
| 2005 | "Metamorphoze" | 2 | Gold | 156,709 (62nd, 2005) | Diabolos |
| 2005 | "Todokanai Ai to Shitteita no ni Osaekirezu ni Aishitsuzuketa..." | 3 | Gold | 100,000 | Diabolos |
| 2006 | "Redemption" | 3 | Gold | 124,955 (83rd, 2006) | Best of the Best: Wild |
| 2006 | "Love Letter" | 9 | — | 28,000 | Love Letter |
| 2007 | "No ni Saku Hana no Yō ni" | 3 | — | 68,000 | — |
| 2007 | "Returner (Yami no Shūen)" | 1 | — | 67,000 | Last Moon |
| 2008 | "Jesus" | 7 | — | 32,000 | Re:Born |
| 2009 | "Ghost" | 6 | — | 24,000 | Re:Born |
| 2009 | "Journey Through the Decade" | 2 | Platinum | 250,000 (63rd, 2009) | Best of the Best: Mild |
| 2009 | "Koakuma Heaven" | 6 | — | 25,000 | Re:Born |
| 2009 | "Faraway (Hoshi ni Negai o)" | 8 | — | 20,000 | Re:Born |
| 2009 | "Lost Angels" | 5 | — | 20,000 | Re:Born |
| 2009 | "Flower" | 7 | — | 20,000 | Re:Born |
| 2009 | "The Next Decade" | 4 | — | 56,335 | — |
| 2009 | "Setsugekka (The End of Silence)/Zan" | 4 | — | 32,000 | Last Moon |
| 2010 | "Stay the Ride Alive" | 3 | — | 40,000 | Best of the Best: Wild |
| 2010 | "Ever" | 4 | — | 55,000 | Best of the Best: Wild |
| 2011 | "Episode.0" | 3 | — | 40,000 | — |
| 2011 | "Graffiti" | 4 | — | 22,000 | Best of the Best: Mild |
| 2012 | "Until The Last Day" | 8 | — | 20,000 | Best of the Best: Wild |
| 2012 | "Hakuro" | 6 | — | 20,000 | Best of the Best: Mild |
| 2012 | "White Lovers (Shiawase na Toki)" | 7 | — | 20,000 | Best of the Best: Mild |
| 2014 | "P.S. I Love U" | 12 | — | 20,000 | Last Moon |
| 2014 | "Akatsukizukuyo (Day Breakers)" | 8 | — | 20,000 | Last Moon |
| 2015 | "Arrow" | 15 | — | 15,000 | Last Moon |
| 2016 | "Kimi Dake no Boku de Iru Kara" | 30 | — | 5,000 | Last Moon |
| 2017 | "Tsumi no Keishō (Original Sin)" | 18 | — | 10,000 | — |
| 2026 | "Stand Alone" | — | — | — | — |
| 2026 | "Fall Again" | — | — | — | — |

- On December 27, 2006, Japanese recording charts Oricon wrote up the list of Gackt's top ten best selling singles. The sales can be seen in the table, from first: "Another World", "Vanilla", "Jūnigatsu no Love Song", "Metamorphoze", "Kimi no Tameni Dekiru Koto", "Wasurenai Kara", "Oasis", "Redemption", "Kimi ni Aitakute", and "Mizérable".

=== Credited work ===
Covers

- 1997 - Hideki Saijo's "Kizudarake no Lola" as a vocalist.
- 2000 - Stevie Wonder's "To Feel the Fire" as part of Kirin's Fire brand of coffee campaign.
- 2003 - John Lennon's "Love", performed at the "Dream Power: John Lennon Super Live" concert organized by Yoko Ono in Saitama Super Arena.
- 2016 - Ayumi Hamasaki's "Seasons" as part of Nescafé Dolce Gusto brand of coffee campaign.
- 2017 - Dreams Come True's "Suki" released in The Best Covers Of Dreams Come True Doriuta Vol.1. (2017).
- Many songs during the cover concert festival conceptualized around fictional school "Camui Gakuen" held since 2009.

Other contribution

- 2006 - Ji Dandi "Lover 〜愛しい人〜" (songwriter, composer)
- 2008 - Tōru Furuya "ララの夜想曲-nocturne-" (composer)
- 2014 - Mayo Kawasaki "Why" (supplemental songwriter, composer)
- 2019 - BoA "スキだよ-MY LOVE-" (lyricist)
- 2024 - Tube "Sayonara no Kawaii ni" (サヨナラのかわりに) (co-singer and songwriter)

== Video discography ==
Gackt video discography
- Music videos: 45
- Concert tour videos: 25
- Video compilations: 3
- Platinum Boxes: 16

=== Concert tour videos ===
| Year | Title (information) | Oricon Peak |
|---|---|---|
| 2000 | Mars Sora Kara no Homonsha: Kaisō: VHS release: October 4, 2000; DVD release: November 20, 2000 | 44 |
| 2001 | Requiem et Reminiscence (Shuuen to Seijyaku): VHS release: September 28, 2001; DVD release: November 30, 2001 | 10 |
| 2003 | Gackt Live Tour 2002 Kagen no Tsuki (Seiya no Shirabe): VHS and DVD release: March 19, 2003 | 6 |
| 2003 | Gackt Live Tour 2003 Jougen no Tsuki (Saishusho): VHS and DVD release: September 18, 2003 | 5 |
| 2004 | Gackt Live Tour 2004 The Sixth Day & Seventh Night (Final): DVD release: September 15, 2004 | 4 |
| 2006 | Live Tour 2005 Diabolos (Aien no Shi to Seiya no Namida): DVD release: March 29, 2006 | 5 |
| 2006 | Asia Tour Diabolos (哀婉 no Toki) in Korea Documentary: DVD release: November 15, 2006 (limited) | — |
| 2007 | Gackt Training Days in Korea Drug Party Asia Tour: DVD release: May 30, 2007 (limited) | — |
| 2007 | Gackt Training Days 2006 Drug Party - Zepp Tokyo: DVD release: July 4 (limited), August 8, 2007 | — |
| 2007 | Gackt Training Days in Taiwan Drug Party Asia Tour: DVD release: August 31, 2007 (limited) | — |
| 2010 | Visualive Arena Tour 2009 Requiem Et Reminiscence II Final Chinkon To Saisei: DVD release: March 31, 2010 | 6 |
| 2014 | Best of the Best I - 40th Birthday: DVD release: March 26, 2014 | 72 |
| 2014 | Best of the Best I - Xtasy: DVD release: March 26, 2014 | 73 |
| 2014 | 2013 Kamui Gakuen de Semena Sai: DVD release: April 23, 2014 | 34 |
| 2014 | Gackt × Tokyo Philharmonic Orchestra "Kareinaru Classic no Yube": DVD release: May 21, 2014 | 11 |
| 2015 | Gackt x Tokyo Philharmonic Orchestra Dai 2 Kai "Kareinaru Classic no Yube": DVD release: April 29, 2015 | 39 |
| 2015 | 2014 Kamui Gakuen 91 - de Matomena Sai: DVD release: May 27, 2015 | 33 |
| 2016 | 2015 Kamui Gakuen 92 - de Dashitekudasai - Minna no Omoi wo Da, Da, Dashitekudasai -: DVD release: August 31, 2016 | 6 |
| 2017 | Gackt Japan Tour 2016 Last Visualive Saigo no Tsuki –Last Moon–: DVD release: March 14, 2017 | 3 |
| 2018 | 2017 Kamui Gakuen 93: DVD release: January 24, 2018 | — |
| 2018 | Gackt -45th Birthday Concert- Last Songs: DVD release: December 24, 2018 | — |
| 2019 | 2018 Kamui Gakuen 94: DVD release: September 28, 2019 | — |
| 2020 | 2019 Kamui Gakuen 95: DVD release: July 4, 2020 | — |
| 2020 | Gackt 20th Anniversary Live Tour 2020 Khaos: DVD release: July 4, 2020 | — |
| 2021 | Gackt Last Songs 2021 feat. K: DVD release: November 25, 2021 | — |
| 2023 | Gackt Last Songs 2023 feat. K: DVD release: July 4, 2023 | — |
| 2024 | Gackt Last Songs 2024 feat. K: DVD release: February 14, 2024 | — |
| 2025 | Gackt Philharmonic 2025 -Maō shinfoni-: DVD release: November 12, 2025 | 18 |

=== Concert tour videos compilations ===
| Year | Title (information) | Oricon Peak |
|---|---|---|
| 2008 | nine*nine: Released: October 29, 2008; Limited edition | 34 |

=== Music videos compilations ===
| Year | Title (information) | Oricon Peak |
|---|---|---|
| 2006 | The Greatest Filmography 1999-2006 (Red): DVD release: August 23, 2006 | 7 |
| 2006 | The Greatest Filmography 1999-2006 (Blue): DVD release: August 23, 2006 | 6 |

=== Video singles ===
| Year | Title (information) | Oricon Peak |
|---|---|---|
| 1999 | Video Vanilla: VHS release: December 8, 1999 | — |
| 2000 | Video Mirror Oasis: VHS release: June 28, 2000 | — |
| 2001 | Saisei to Shuen: VHS release: June 21, 2001 | — |
| 2002 | Soyokaze: VHS release: March 1, 2002 | — |
| 2003 | Gekkou: VHS and DVD release: August 6, 2003 | 4 |

=== Platinum Box series ===
| Year | Title (information) | Oricon Peak |
|---|---|---|
| 2000 | Platinum Box: VHS release: December 16, 2000 | 29 |
| 2001 | Platinum Box II: VHS and DVD release: December 21, 2001 | 6 |
| 2002 | Platinum Box III: DVD release: December 21, 2002 | 15 |
| 2003 | Platinum Box IV: DVD release: December 16, 2003 | 17 |
| 2004 | Platinum Box V: DVD release: December 14, 2004 | 10 |
| 2005 | Platinum Box VI: DVD release: December 5, 2005 | 20 |
| 2006 | Platinum Box VII: DVD release: December 6, 2006 | 13 |
| 2007 | Platinum Box VIII: DVD release: December 24, 2007 | — |
| 2008 | Platinum Box IX: DVD release: October 26, 2008 | — |
| 2009 | Platinum Box X: DVD release: December 24, 2009 | — |
| 2011 | Platinum Box XI: DVD release: January 19, 2011 | — |
| 2012 | Platinum Box XII: DVD release: January 25, 2012 | — |
| 2013 | Platinum Box XIII: DVD release: November 31, 2013 | — |
| 2014 | Platinum Box XIV: DVD release: May 15, 2014 | 37 |
| 2015 | Platinum Box XV: DVD release: March 11, 2015 | 42 |
| 2016 | Platinum Box XVI: DVD release: March 16, 2016 | 46 |
| 2017 | Platinum Box XVII: DVD release: March 15, 2017 | 19 |

== Bibliography (other) ==
- 素晴らしきかな人生 2001 Oricon
- 素晴らしきかな人生2 2003 Oricon ISBN 4-88660-394-7
- 素晴らしきかな人生3 2005 Oricon ISBN 4-87131-100-7

Photobook

- Photographer - Aoi Tsutsumi: Gackt Mizérable 飛翔―フランス・ロケ写真集 1999 音楽専科社 ISBN 4-87279-020-0
- Aoi Tsutsumi: Gackt Mizérable 運命―フランス・ロケ写真集 1999 音楽専科社 ISBN 4-87279-022-7
- Mitsuru Hirose, Kenji Tsukakoshi: Gackt For Dears-Féter nos retrouvailles 2000 ソニーマガジンズ ISBN 4-7897-1588-4
- Masaaki Miyazawa: Gackt Just Bring It Live Tour 2002. 2002 フォーブリック ISBN 4-89461-920-2
- Kobayashi Baku: Gackt―君が追いかけた夢. 2003 小学館 ISBN 4-09-380041-3
- Kenji Tsukakoshi: Moon Child-Hyde&Gackt. 2003 ワニブックス ISBN 4-8470-2757-4
- Masaaki Miyazawa: 2002 Final Live～下弦の月～/2003 Live Tour ～上弦の月～. 2003
- Kenji Tsukakoshi: Crescent. 2003 株式会社MCプレス ISBN 9784886603920
- Seiichi Nomura: 龍の化身. 2007 NHK Publishing ISBN 978-4-14-081263-1
- Seiichi Nomura: 眠狂四郎 闇と月. 2011 Kodansha ISBN 978-4-06-216343-9
- Seiichi Nomura: "Visualive 2009 Documentary Book Gackt Requiem Et Reminiscence II 〜鎮魂と再生〜. 2009 福家書店
- Keiki Takenaka: Gackt in Europe: "Yellow Fried Chichkenz" 2010-2011. 2012 講談社
- Keiki Takenaka: Moon Saga-義経秘伝-. 2013 株式会社うぼん
- Keiki Takenaka: Gackt Live Tour 2013 Best of the Best vol.I M/W. 2014 株式会社G-PRO
- Gackt Platinum Book ～Private Treasures～. 2018 CSI株式会社

Tour document book (partly photobooks)

- Gackt For Dears-F´eter nos retrouvailles. 2000 ソニーマガジンズ
- Gackt Requiem et R´eminisence 〜鎮魂と再生〜. 2001 ソニーマガジンズ
- Gackt Moon Project Document Book「白昼の月」. 2004 ソニーマガジンズ
- Gackt The Gift "The Sixth Day & Seventh Night". 2004 ソニーマガジンズ
- Gackt Tour Document Diabolos 哀婉の詩. 2006 ソニーマガジンズ
- Gackt Japan Tour 2016 Last Visualive 最期ノ月 -Last Moon-. 2016 株式会社glove

== See also ==
- Malice Mizer discography
