= The Greatest Filmography 1999–2006 =

2006 collection of music videos by Gackt

- Blue edition

Video by Gackt
- Released: August 23, 2006 (JP); October 9, 2007 (NA)
- Recorded: 1999–2006
- Genre: Rock, pop
- Length: 65 minutes (Blue); 54 minutes (Red)
- Label: Nippon Crown, Viz Pictures

Gackt chronology
| Diabolos (Aien no Shi to Seiya no Namida) (2006) | The Greatest Filmography; 1999–2006 (2006) | Drug Party in Korea (2007) |

Alternative cover
- Red edition

The Greatest Filmography 1999–2006 is a collection of Gackt's music videos released on DVD on August 23, 2006, by Nippon Crown, and in the United States and Canada on October 9, 2007, by Viz Pictures. It was released in two editions, "Red," themed around rock-oriented videos, and "Blue," themed around ballad-oriented videos. The version released in North America contains English subtitles.

In an interview with Shojo Beat magazine, Gackt said that for him, the visually most beautiful music video is of "Saikai (Story)." The video for "Another World" was filmed in Hong Kong, and it was filmed as if they were shooting a movie, which took days to do. For the video of "Redemption," they had a problem with the original schedule, so they had to film it all night long in a ruined warehouse. Most of Gackt's music videos were filmed in Japan, but some were also shot in locations in the United States (Nevada, California), Australia, and Germany.

== Track listing ==
All tracks are written by Gackt C.

DVD Red
| No. | Title | Director(s) | Length |
|---|---|---|---|
| 1. | "Another World" | Makoto Hasegawa |
| 2. | "Oasis" | Theodore Loveland |
| 3. | "Secret Garden" | Hana Ogawa |
| 4. | "Redemption" | Tomoo Noda |
| 5. | "Mizérable" | Young Kim |
| 6. | "Black Stone" | Tsuyoshi Inoue |
| 7. | "Seki-Ray" | Nobuo Yoda |
| 8. | "Vanilla" | Spencer Susser |
| 9. | "Kimi ga Oikaketa Yume" (Dreams You Pursued) | Makoto Hasegawa |
| 10. | "Mirror" | Theodore Loveland |
| 11. | "Wasurenai Kara" (Never Forget You) | Makoto Hasegawa |
| 12. | "Metamorphoze" | Tomoo Noda |

DVD Blue
| No. | Title | Director(s) | Length |
|---|---|---|---|
| 1. | "Saikai ~Story~" (My Story) | Makoto Hasegawa |
| 2. | "Kimi no Tame ni Dekiru Koto" (Everything For You) | Makoto Hasegawa |
| 3. | "Tsuki no Uta" (Luna Hymn) | Shinji Watanabe |
| 4. | "Kimi Ga Matteiru Kara -Unplugged-" (Because You Are Expecting Me) | Makoto Hasegawa |
| 5. | "Todokanai Ai to Shitteita no ni Osaekirezu ni Aishitsuzuketa..." (I Know My Love Can Never Reach You) | Tomoo Noda |
| 6. | "Jūnigatsu no Love Song" (December Love Song) | Makoto Hasegawa |
| 7. | "Last Song -Unplugged-" | Makoto Hasegawa |
| 8. | "Kimi ni Aitakute" (Longing For You) | Makoto Hasegawa |
| 9. | "Arittake no Ai de" (With All My Love) | Tsuyoshi Inoue |
| 10. | "Last Song" | Makoto Hasegawa |
| 11. | "Mirror -Unplugged-" | Makoto Hasegawa |
| 12. | "Love Letter" | Makoto Hasegawa |
