= Ju-ken =

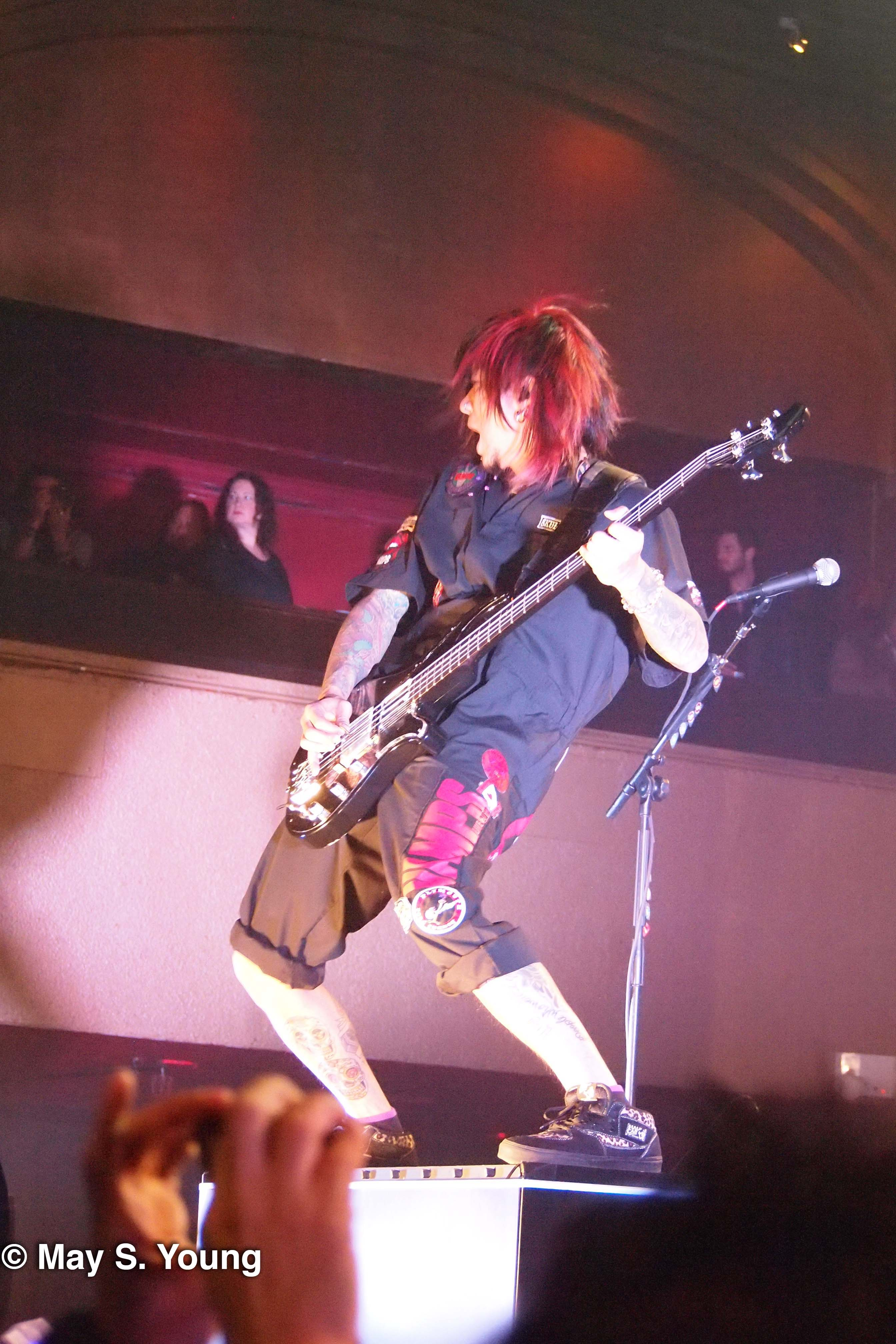
- Ju-ken in New York City, 2013

Background information
- Also known as: Date
- Born: June 27, 1971 (age 54)
- Origin: Funabashi, Chiba, Japan
- Genres: Alternative rock, hard rock, pop punk, pop rock, pop
- Occupations: Session musician, bassist
- Instruments: Bass, contrabass
- Years active: 1998–present
- Website: ju-ken.velvet.jp

Ju-ken (born June 27, 1971 in Funabashi, Chiba, Japan) is a Japanese session bassist. He was a support member of Gackt, Vamps and Anna Tsuchiya. He is one of the most in-demand bassists in Japan.

== Career ==
Ju-ken started his professional career when he was 26 as a member of the band Nitro alongside By-Sexual drummer Nao and Ilmari of Rip Slyme. In 1998, he played bass on the first disc of Heath first full-length studio album, Gang Age Cubist.

Ju-ken supported the supergroup S.K.I.N. at their only concert in 2007, and participated in Gackt's 2008-2009 «Requiem et Reminiscence II 〜再生と邂逅〜» tour. In 2017, he formed the band Sengoku Jidai: The Age of Civil Wars (戦国時代－The age of civil wars－), where he uses the name "Date", with Kazuma and Jun-ji of Siam Shade and Jurassic vocalist Yu+ki. Ju-ken began working with a third Siam Shade member in 2025, when he formed a duo with Natchin, where they both play bass and sing.

== Discography ==
=== Anna Tsuchiya ===
- Anna Tsuchiya Inspi' Nana (Black Stones) (CD+DVD) (2007)
- Bubble Trip/Sweet Sweet Song (CD+DVD) (2007)
- Anna Tsuchiya feat. AI - Crazy World (CD+DVD) (2008)
- Nudy Show! (2008)

- 1st Live Tour Blood Of Roses (DVD) (2007)

=== Ends ===
- Live 2005 Total Tone DVD (2005)

=== Gackt ===
==== Studio albums ====
- Crescent (2003)
- 7th night ~unplugged~ (2004)
- Love Letter (2005)
- Diabolos (2005)

==== Singles ====
- Todokanai ai to shitteita no ni osaekirezu ni aishitsuzuketa (2005)
- Metamorphoze (2005)
- BLACK STONE (2005)
- Love Letter (2006)
- Redemption (2006)

==== DVD ====
- Live Tour 2004 The Sixth Day & Seventh Night~Final~ (2004)
- DIABOLOS ~Aien no Uta~ in Korea (2006)
- Live Tour 2005 DIABOLOS ~Aien no Uta to Seiya no Namida~ (2006)
- Greatest Filmography 1999-2006 ~Red~ (2007)
- Greatest Filmography 1999-2006 ~Blue~ (2007)
- Training Days 2006 Drug Party ~ Zepp Tokyo Live (2007)
- Training Days in Taiwan Drug Party Asia Tour (2007)
- Training Days in Korea Drug Party Asia Tour (2007)
- Nine*Nine (2008)

- Platinum Box V (2004)
- Platinum Box VI (2005)
- Platinum Box VII (2006)
- Platinum Box VIII (2008)
- Platinum Box IX (2009)

=== Tomoyasu Hotei ===
==== DVD ====
- MONSTER DRIVE PARTY!!! (2005)
- All Time Super Best Tour (2006)
- Super Soul Sessions (2007)
- Hotei and The Wanderers — Funky Punky Tour 2007-2008 (2008)

=== Inoran ===
- ニライカナイ (Niraikanai) (CD+DVD) (2007)

=== Shue (酒井愁) ===
- 夜露死苦哀愁 (CD) (2007)

Music author for «M-2.die in peace» (track 2 on the album)

=== Vamps ===
==== Studio albums ====
- Beast (2010)

==== Singles ====
- Love Addict (CD+DVD) (2008)

==== DVD ====
- Vamps Live 2008 (2009)
- Vamps Live 2009 U.S.A. (2010)
- Vamps Live 2009 (2010)

== Equipment ==
Ju-ken primarily uses handmade Sugi and vintage and custom shop Fender basses

=== Sugi basses (names given by Ju-ken) ===
- Sugi Burst
- Sugi Tiki
- Sugi Nero
- Sugi Daruma
- Sugi Spiderman
- Sugi Bel Verde

=== Fender Basses ===
- Fender American Deluxe Jazz Bass (at least 2 of them)
- Fender '65 vintage Jazz Bass
- Fender '73 vintage Jazz Bass
- Fender '73 vintage Precision Bass
- Fender '78 vintage Precision Bass
- Fender Precision Bass (current model)
- Fender Custom Shop Jazz Bass

=== Other basses ===
- Spector NS-2
- Musicman Stingray
- Michael Kelly Dragon Fly acoustic Bass

=== Other instruments ===
- Paul Reed Smith Singlecut/20th Artist Package Guitar
- Unidentified Contrabass

=== Amplification ===
- Fender 400h head
- Fender 810 Pro Enclosures cabinet
- MarkBass Mini Cmd 151p combo

=== Other equipment ===
- Fostex FR-2LE Field Memory Recorder
- Fostex MC11S Stereo Microphone
- Fostex T50RP Headphones
