= Mizérable =

Mizérable may refer to:

- Mizérable (EP), an EP by Gackt
- Mizérable (song), a song by Gackt
