= Gekko (disambiguation) =

Gekko is a genus of lizards native to Southeast Asia.

Gekko may also refer to:

- Gekko (optimization software)
- Gekko Records
- Gordon Gekko, a fictitious character from the movie Wall Street
- Gekko, a superhero from PJ Masks

Gekkō (月光, ja:月光) also means "moonlight" in Japanese:

- Gekko (microprocessor), the CPU of the GameCube
- A variant of the Japanese Nakajima J1N fighter of World War II
- Gekkō, a type of mechanized weapon in the Metal Gear game universe
- The Gekko Observatory in Japan
- Gekko Moriah, an antagonist in the manga One Piece
- Gekkou, video album by Gackt

== See also ==
- Gecko (disambiguation)
