= Gecko (disambiguation) =

A gecko is a type of lizard of the suborder Gekkota.

Gecko may also refer to:

== Computing and software ==
- The HP 9000 712/60 and 80i workstations
- Gecko (software), the open source web browser layout engine used in many applications developed by the Mozilla Foundation (notably Firefox and Thunderbird), as well as in many other open source software projects.
- GeckOS, an experimental operating system for MOS 6502 and compatible processors

== Military ==
- SA-8 Gecko, the NATO reporting name for the Russian Antey 9K33 "Osa", a mobile short-range tactical surface-to-air missile system
- Objective Gecko, part of the October 7 – December 17, 2001 United States invasion of Afghanistan
- Operations Gecko, Gecko III A and Gecko IIIB, August - October 2007, parts of coalition military operations of the Iraq War

== Music ==
- "Gecko", a song by Tangerine Dream
- "Gecko" (song), by Oliver Heldens, later rereleased as "Gecko (Overdrive)" vs Becky Hill

== Video games ==
- Gex (series), a video game series
- Gecko, a fictional location in Fallout 2
- Gecko, a nickname of Claude Speed in the video game Grand Theft Auto

== Other ==
- Gecko, Louisiana, an unincorporated community, United States
- Gecko (theatre company), in London
- Gecko (TV channel), an Australian free-to-air, datacasting home shopping television channel
- Gaspar Le Gecko, a fictional character in the animated television series Brandy & Mr. Whiskers
- The GEICO Gecko, an animated gecko appearing in GEICO insurance commercials

== See also ==
- Gekko (disambiguation)
- Geico
