= Nine*nine =

nine*nine

Box set by Gackt
- Released: October 29, 2008
- Genre: Pop rock, alternative rock, art rock, hard rock, neo-progressive rock
- Length: 621:14
- Label: Nippon Crown

Gackt chronology
Drug Party - Zepp Tokyo (2007)	nine*nine (2008)	Requiem et Reminiscence II (2010)

nine*nine is a limited edition box set of Gackt's video lives released on October 29, 2008. It collects the artist's previous live tour concerts from 2000 until 2006 on 13 CD's. The box also contains a bonus DVD featuring interviews, miniature booklets of all tours, and two unreleased songs; "Justified", and 1997's cover of song "Kizudarake No Lola" by Hideki Saijo. It reached number thirty-four on Oricon.

In March 2025 were distributed digitally live music recordings from the collection as live albums, with official live videos of "Kimi no Tame ni Dekiru Koto" (2001), "Last Song" (2004) and "Another World" (2006).

== Track listing ==
=== 2000 - MARS 空からの訪問者〜回想〜 (MARS Sora Kara no Homonsha~Kaisou~) ===
No.	Title	Length
1.	"Ares"	1:54
2.	"Asrun Dream"	5:58
3.	"Emu ~for my dear~ (絵夢 ～for my dear～)"	6:12
4.	"Illness Illusion"	3:27
5.	"Seki-ray (鶺鴒 ～seki-ray～)"	4:55
6.	"freesia ～op.1～"	4:10
7.	"freesia ～op.2～"	2:31
8.	"blue (Piano Solo)"	4:45
9.	"OASIS"	4:52
10.	"Mirror"	8:03
11.	"U + K"	5:30
12.	"Vanilla"	4:15
13.	"dears"	5:27
14.	"Kono Daremo Inai Heya De (この誰もいない部屋で)"	16:50

=== 2001 - Requiem et Reminiscence 〜終焉と静寂〜 (Requiem et Reminiscence ~Shuuen to Seijyaku~) ===
==== CD 1 ====
No.	Title	Length
1.	"NINE SPIRAL"	3:22
2.	"Maria"	4:09
3.	"seven"	4:12
4.	"uncontrol"	4:08
5.	"Sayonara"	11:24
6.	"Secret Garden"	7:43
7.	"Kalmia"	4:41
8.	"Cube"	5:35

==== CD 2 ====
No.	Title	Length
1.	"Seki-ray (鶺鴒 〜seki-ray〜)"	5:09
2.	"U + K"	5:27
3.	"Mirror"	6:12
4.	"Papa lapped a pap lopped"	3:54
5.	"marmelade"	4:20
6.	"Kimi no Tameni Dekiru Koto (君のためにできること)"	6:19
7.	"Saikai 〜Story〜 (再会〜Story〜)"	9:53

=== 2002 - 下弦の⽉〜聖夜の調〜 (Kagen no Tsuki —Seiya no Shirabe—) ===
==== CD 1 ====
No.	Title	Length
1.	"Noah"	2:17
2.	"Doomsday"	4:37
3.	"death wish"	5:44
4.	"Lu:na"	3:42
5.	"Speed Master"	5:08
6.	"Fragrance"	5:59
7.	"rain"	9:31
8.	"Lapis ～Prologue～"	3:38
9.	"ANOTHER WORLD"	6:48

==== CD 2 ====
No.	Title	Length
1.	"Mirror"	7:10
2.	"Soleil"	3:48
3.	"wa・su・re・na・i・ka・ra"	5:05
4.	"dears"	5:27
5.	"Missing"	6:27
6.	"Jūnigatsu no Love Song (12月のLove song)"	9:11
7.	"Kimi no Tameni Dekiru Koto (君のためにできること)"	6:17

=== 2003 - 上弦の⽉〜最終章〜 (Jogen no Tsuki —Saishusho—) ===
==== CD 1 ====
No.	Title	Length
1.	"Noah"	2:15
2.	"Speed Master"	3:36
3.	"Lu:na"	3:34
4.	"Fragrance"	5:34
5.	"rain"	6:47
6.	"Solitude ～regret～"	6:24
7.	"Kimi Ga Matte Iru Kara (君が待っているから)"	4:30
8.	"Doomsday"	4:42
9.	"Tsuki no Uta (月の詩)"	4:51
10.	"Missing"	5:45

==== CD 2 ====
No.	Title	Length
1.	"Mirror"	7:36
2.	"ANOTHER WORLD"	3:38
3.	"Soleil"	3:53
4.	"wa・su・re・na・i・ka・ra"	5:10
5.	"Kimi Ga Oikaketa Yume (君が追いかけた夢)"	6:07
6.	"memories"	8:02
7.	"birdcage"	6:40
8.	"Orenji no Taiyou (オレンジの太陽)"	8:50

=== 2004 - THE SIXTH DAY & SEVENTH NIGHT 〜FINAL〜 ===
==== CD 1 ====
No.	Title	Length
1.	"泡沫の夢 (Utakata no Yume)"	3:02
2.	"OASIS"	5:21
3.	"Secret Garden"	4:54
4.	"Lu:na"	4:11
5.	"Mizérable"	5:09
6.	"Seki-ray (鶺鴒 〜seki-ray〜)"	5:34
7.	"Last Song"	9:09
8.	"Kimi Ga Matte Iru Kara (君が待っているから)"	6:08
9.	"mind forest"	6:32

==== CD 2 ====
No.	Title	Length
1.	"U + K (Introduction)"	2:31
2.	"Pappa lapped a pap lopped"	6:06
3.	"Mirror"	7:49
4.	"U + K"	4:51
5.	"Vanilla"	4:18
6.	"Kimi Ga Oikaketa Yume (君が追いかけた夢)"	5:24
7.	"ANOTHER WORLD"	3:42
8.	"Kimi no Tameni Dekiru Koto (君のためにできること)"	7:03
9.	"Saikai 〜Story〜 (再会〜Story〜)"	7:04

=== 2005 - DIABOLOS〜哀婉の詩と聖夜の涙〜 (DIABOLOS〜Aien no Shi to Seiya no Namida〜) ===
==== CD 1 ====
No.	Title	Length
1.	"Dybbuk"	3:50
2.	"white eyes"	3:54
3.	"Dispar"	4:10
4.	"Metamorphoze"	3:36
5.	"REDEMPTION -"	4:19
6.	"Ash"	4:38
7.	"Misty"	8:08
8.	"Lust for blood"	5:15
9.	"Noesis"	5:45
10.	"Farewell"	4:50

==== CD 2 ====
No.	Title	Length
1.	"Future"	5:52
2.	"Black Stone"	3:16
3.	"Mirror"	8:02
4.	"U + K"	4:59
5.	"Storm"	3:54
6.	"Road"	6:50
7.	"Todokanai Ai to Shitteita no ni Osaekirezu ni Aishitsuzuketa... (届カナイ愛ト知ッテイタノニ 抑エキレズニ愛シ続ケタ･･･)"	8:03
8.	"Jūnigatsu no Love Song (12月のLove song)"	9:36
9.	"Love Letter"	5:15

=== 2006 - Gackt Training Days D.R.U.G. Party ===
==== CD 1 ====
No.	Title	Length
1.	"Cube"	5:31
2.	"Maria"	4:08
3.	"uncontrol"	4:14
4.	"Emu ~for my dear~ (絵夢 ～for my dear～)"	6:49
5.	"seven"	3:50
6.	"REDEMPTION"	4:13
7.	"Ash"	4:37
8.	"NINE SPIRAL"	3:15
9.	"Speed Master"	4:50
10.	"Lu:na"	3:49

==== CD 2 ====
No.	Title	Length
1.	"Storm"	3:53
2.	"Pappa lapped a pap lopped"	4:39
3.	"Kalmia"	5:05
4.	"Fragrance"	5:40
5.	"mind forest"	4:31
6.	"Metamorphoze"	3:48
7.	"Birdcage"	6:28
8.	"ANOTHER WORLD"	4:56
9.	"Kimi Ga Oikaketa Yume (君が追いかけた夢)"	8:28
