= Platinum Box II =

PLATINUM BOX 〜II〜

Video by Gackt
- Released: December 21, 2001
- Genre: Alternative rock, Pop rock, pop
- Length: 44:01
- Label: Nippon Crown

Gackt chronology
Saisei to shuuen (VHS) (2001)	PLATINUM BOX 〜II〜 (2001)	PLATINUM BOX III (DVD) (2002)

PLATINUM BOX II is a DVD + VHS box set, released by Japanese singer Gackt on December 21, 2001. It contain 8 Music videos on the DVD, and a compilation of behind-the-scenes footage on the VHS.

== DVD Content ==
1. Mizérable
2. Vanilla
3. Mirror
4. OASIS
5. Seki-ray (鶺鴒 〜seki-ray〜)
6. Saikai 〜Story〜 (再会〜Story〜)
7. Secret Garden
8. Kimi no Tameni Dekiru Koto (君のためにできること)

== VHS Content ==
1. Recollections (behind-the-scenes footage)
