= Remix of Gackt =

Single by Gackt
- Released: November 3, 1999
- Genre: Techno, Alternative rock
- Length: 26:24
- Label: Nippon Crown
- Songwriter: Gackt C.

Gackt singles chronology
"Vanilla" (1999)	"Remix of Gackt" (1999)	"Mirror" (2000)

"Remix of Gackt" is an unofficial remix single of Gackt songs released on November 3, 1999. The single includes 4 tracks consistent of "Mizérable" and "Vanilla," remixed by 4 different DJs. It peaked at thirteenth place on the Oricon weekly chart and charted for four weeks.

== Track listing ==
No.	Title	Length
1.	"Vanilla (MR Plastic DUB)"	7:22
2.	"Mizerable (Tiny Voice, Production Remix)"	5:41
3.	"Mizerable (Into the Water Mix-Quadra)"	9:02
4.	"Vanilla (マン山田 Remix)"	4:19
