= Until the Last Day =

Single by Gackt
- B-side: "Until the Last Day D.A. Edit"
- Released: February 22, 2012
- Recorded: 2012
- Genre: Hard rock
- Length: 4:05
- Label: Avex Entertainment
- Songwriters: Gackt, Shoko Fujibayashi, Ryo

Gackt singles chronology
"Graffiti" (2011)	"Until the Last Day" (2012)	"Hakuro" (2012)

"Until the Last Day" is the forty-first single of Japanese solo artist Gackt, released on February 22, 2012. It is the theme song for the CG-animated movie Dragon Age: Dawn of the Seeker. The song was covered in mixed English version by Gackt's band Yellow Fried Chickenz and was included as a bonus track in their studio album Yellow Fried Chickenz I, released in March 2012.

The song was written with Gackt's outlook on life, "it's a dying message for those who are trying to run away right in front of me ... the key is to have your own beliefs, make a decision, and then take action. This leads to a great driving force for living".

== Track listings and formats ==
All lyrics are written by Gackt and Shoko Fujibayashi; all music is composed by Gackt and Ryo, arranged by Ryo.

CD (AVCA-49498)
No.	Title	Length
1.	"Until the Last Day"	4:05
2.	"Until the Last Day D.A. Edit"	3:26
3.	"Until the Last Day (instrumental)"

CD + DVD(AVCA-49497/B)
No.	Title	Length
1.	"Until the Last Day (Music Film)"

== Chart performance ==
=== Oricon sales chart ===
Release	Provider(s)	Chart	Peak position	Sales total
February 22, 2012	Oricon	Weekly Singles	8	16,188
February 22, 2012	Oricon	Monthly Singles	25	18,680

Billboard Japan

Chart (2012)	Peak position
Billboard Japan Hot 100	11
Billboard Japan Hot Animation	3
