= Mars (Gackt album) =

Studio album by Gackt
- Released: April 26, 2000
- Recorded: 2000
- Studio: Burnish Stone Recording Studio; One Voice Komazawa; Peninsula; Sound Sky Studio; Tower Side Studio
- Genre: Pop rock, progressive rock, alternative rock
- Length: 50:02
- Label: Nippon Crown
- Producer: Gackt

Gackt chronology
Mizérable (1999)	Mars (2000)	Rebirth (2001)

Singles from Mars
- 1. "Vanilla" Released: August 11, 1999; 2. "Mirror" Released: February 9, 2000; 3. "Oasis" Released: February 16, 2000

Alternative cover
- Live tour DVD cover

Professional ratings
Review scores
Source	Rating
Sputnikmusic	4.5/5 stars

Mars is the first full-length studio album released by Japanese solo artist Gackt. It was released on April 26, 2000.

== Release ==
The album was released on April 26, 2000, by Nippon Crown. In the second counting week of May, it reached number three on the Oricon charts, with sales of 153,500 copies. In the upcoming week, it was at the number sixteen, with sales of 23,540 copies. It charted for only five weeks. Since its release, the album has sold more than 200,000 copies. It was certified gold by RIAJ in 2000.

Preceding the release of the album was the release of three singles, "Vanilla", "Mirror", and "Oasis". The first single, "Vanilla", is one of Gackt's most popular and commercially successful songs. It reached number four on the fourth counting week of August 1999, with sales of 104,650 copies. In the upcoming three weeks, it was at number thirteen two times, and fifteen, with sales of 40,990, and 31,810, and 22,440 copies. It charted for ten weeks. With 248,360 copies sold, it was the 89th best-selling single of the year, and it was certified Gold by RIAJ. The single was later re-released in 2002. It charted for six weeks, reaching number twelve, with sales of 19,220 copies.

The second single, "Mirror", reached number nine on the third counting week of February 2000, with sales of 76,690 copies. It charted for 6 weeks, and sold over 116,770 copies. The third single, "Oasis", reached number seven on the fourth counting week of February 2000, with sales of 84,690 copies. It charted for 6 weeks, and sold over 126,280 copies.

== Promotion ==
Mars ~Sora Kara no Hōmon-sha~ Kaisō (MARS 〜空からの訪問者〜 回想, lit. "Mars: A Visitor from the Sky (Flashbacks)") was the first live tour of Gackt. It was released on VHS on October 4, 2000, and on DVD on November 11, 2000. Lawson sold a special backstage report titled Mars ~Sora Kara no Hōmon-sha~ Kiseki on November 27, 2000. The VHS contained making-of videos for all of the special screens used in the show. The video recording of the final concert was filmed on June 1, 2000, at the Yokohama Arena.

Mars ~Sora Kara no Hōmon-sha~ Kaisō
No.	Title	Length
1.	"Ares"
2.	"Asrun Dream"
3.	"Emu ~for my dear~" (絵夢 ～for my dear～; "Dreamscapes ~for my dear~")
4.	"Sekirei ~seki-ray~" (鶺鴒 ～seki-ray～)
5.	"Freesia ~op.1~"
6.	"Freesia ~op.2~"
7.	"Oasis"
8.	"Mirror"
9.	"U+K"
10.	"Vanilla"
11.	"Dears"
12.	"Kono Daremo Inai Heya de" (この誰もいない部屋で; "In This Empty Room")

== Track listing ==
All tracks are written by Gackt

No.	Title	Length
1.	"Ares"	1:35
2.	"Asrun Dream"	4:28
3.	"Emu ~for my dear~" (絵夢〜for my dear〜; "Dreamscapes ~for my dear~")	6:05
4.	"U+K"	4:21
5.	"Vanilla (Mars Ver.)"	4:10
6.	"Freesia ~op.1~"	2:39
7.	"Freesia ~op.2~"	1:57
8.	"Illness Illusion"	3:12
9.	"Mirror (Mars Ver.)"	5:25
10.	"Dears"	4:18
11.	"Oasis (Mars Ver.)"	4:38
12.	"Kono Daremo Inai Heya de" (この誰もいない部屋で; "In This Empty Room")	7:13

=== Notes ===
- While not sung in any actual language, the album's booklet still provides lyrics for the song "Ares".
- "Asrun Dream" was inspired by the Japanese manga series Banana Fish by Akimi Yoshida. The song was written from the perspective of the main character Ash (born as Aslan, pronounced Asuran or Asrun in Japanese) as he watches his friend Eiji sleep.
- "Emu ~for my dear~" and "U+K" were written in memory of Gackt's friend and Malice Mizer member Kami.
- "Dears" was used as the background music in a "Gundam the Ride" commercial.
- An acoustic re-recording of "Dears" later appeared on the 2005 album Love Letter.

== Album credits ==
Personnel

- Vocals, Piano: Gackt
- Guitar, Violin: You
- Guitar: Masa Shinozaki
- Effects, Guitar: Nao Kimura
- Bass, “M-4” Laugh Voice: Ren
- Music Adviser: Yohei Shimada
- Guitar: Chachamaru, Isamu Ohashi
- Keyboards & Orchestra Arrangement: Shusei Tsukamoto
- Keyboards: Jun-ichi “Igao” Igarashi (Envers)
- Drums: Kota Igarashi (by the courtesy of Epic Records), Kozo Suganuma, Toshiyuki Sugino, Eby, Takashi Kawaguchi
- Violin: Gen Ittetsu
- Cello: Masami Horisawa
- ”M-9” Chorus: Junko Hirotani
- ”M-11” Chorus: Ryoko Sato
- ”M-8” Accordion, Voice: Emi=Eleonia
- ”M-12” Kid’s Chorus: Eimi Mori, Yuma Kita, Suzuka Kita, Yusuke Nonaka, Yukine Kaneko, Taiga Gunji

Production

- Producer: Gackt
- Associate Producer: Chachamaru
- Executive Producer: Tomonori Sato (Nippon Crown), You Harada (Museum Museum)
- Recording Engineer: Motonari Matsumoto, Atsuo Akabe, Hiroshi Tanigawa, Susumu Iguchi, Yukio “ucchyi” Uchiumi
- Mastering Engineer: Yoichi Aikawa (Rolling Sound Mastering Studio)

Design

- Art Direction & Design: Jun Misaki
- Photographer: Kenji Tsukagoshi
