= Rebirth (Gackt album) =

Studio album by Gackt
- Released: April 25, 2001
- Recorded: 2001
- Studio: Crescent Studio; West Side Studio; Gajaya Studio; Rolling Sound Mastering Studio (mastering)
- Genre: Art rock, neo-prog, alternative rock
- Length: 49:02
- Label: Nippon Crown
- Producer: Gackt

Gackt chronology
| Mars (2000) | Rebirth (2001) | Moon (2002) |

Singles from Rebirth
- 1. "Sekirei ~seki-ray~" Released: March 8, 2000; 2. "Secret Garden" Released: November 16, 2000; 3. "Kimi no Tame ni Dekiru Koto" Released: March 14, 2001

Professional ratings
Review scores
| Source | Rating |
|---|---|
| Sputnikmusic | 4/5 stars |

Rebirth is the second full-length studio album released by Japanese solo artist Gackt on April 25, 2001. It is a concept album linked to its successor Re:born from 2009.

== Release ==
The album was released on April 25, 2001, by Nippon Crown. In the initial counting week of May it reached number three on the Oricon charts, with sales of 108,390 copies. In the upcoming week, it was at the number fifteen, with sales of 25,910 copies. It charted for 21 weeks. In 2001, with sales of 214,220 copies, it was the 100th best selling album of the year.

Preceding the album release, were released three singles, "Seki-Ray", "Secret Garden" and "Kimi no Tame ni Dekiru Koto". The first single "Seki-Ray" reached number seven on the third counting week of March 2000, with sales of 70,820 copies. In the upcoming two week, it was at number ten, with sales of 16,120. It charted for 6 weeks, and sold over 108,000 copies. The second single "Secret Garden" reached number ten on the fourth counting week of November 2000, with sales of 50,110 copies. It charted for 5 weeks, and sold over 83,000 copies. The third single "Kimi no Tame ni Dekiru Koto" reached number six on the fourth counting week of March 2001, with sales of 50,720 copies. In the upcoming three weeks, it was at number thirteen, sixteen and eighteen respectively, with sales of 18,490, and 14,550, and 9,590 copies. It charted for 18 weeks, and sold over 146,770 copies.

== Track listing ==
All tracks are written by Gackt. C.

| No. | Title | Length |
|---|---|---|
| 1. | "4th…" | 3:22 |
| 2. | "Secret Garden" | 4:39 |
| 3. | "Maria" | 4:20 |
| 4. | "Uncontrol" | 4:14 |
| 5. | "Sekirei ~seki-ray~ (ЯR ver.)" (鶺鴒 ~seki-ray~; "Wagtail ~seki-ray~" (ЯR Ver.)) | 4:10 |
| 6. | "Kalmia" | 4:54 |
| 7. | "Sayonara" ("Goodbye") | 5:20 |
| 8. | "Marmalade" | 4:08 |
| 9. | "Papa lapped a pap lopped" | 3:46 |
| 10. | "Seven" | 4:06 |
| 11. | "Kimi no Tame ni Dekiru Koto (ЯR Ver.)" (君のためにできること; "What I can do for you" (ЯR Ver.)) | 5:10 |

=== Notes ===
- Like "Ares", the intro of Mars, "4th..." is not sung in any actual language. Again, the booklet provides the lyrics.
- "Papa lapped a pap lopped" was used in the 'Mitsubishi DVD & Navi V7000' cm.

== Album credits ==
Personnel

- Vocals, Piano: Gackt
- Guitar, Violin: You
- Guitar: Masa
- Effects, Guitar: Nao Kimura
- Guitar: Yukihiro "chachamaru" Fujimura
- Bass/Cello: Ren
- Drums: Toshiyuki Sugino
- Keyboards programming: Shusei Tsukamoto
- "M-5" Strings arrangement, programming: Yohei Shimada
- Drums: Ryuichi Nishida
- Drums: Kota Igarashi
- Violin: Gen Ittetsu
- Cello: Masami Horisawa
- "M-9" Sexy voice: Mai&Akira

Production

- Producer: Gackt
- Executive Producer: Masami Kudo (Nippon Crown), You Harada (Museum Museum)
- Sound Technical Producer: Yukihiro "chachamaru" Fujimura
- Engineer: Motonari Matsumoto, Kentaro Kikuchi
- Mastering Engineer: Yoichi Aikawa (Rolling Sound Mastering Studio)

Design

- Art direction & Design: Jun Misaki
- Photographer: Kenji Tsukagoshi
