= Diabolos =

Studio album by Gackt
- Released: September 21, 2005
- Recorded: 2005
- Genres: Art rock, neo-prog, alternative rock
- Length: 45:42
- Label: Nippon Crown
- Producer: Gackt

Gackt chronology
Love Letter (2005)	Diabolos (2005)	Jūnigatsu no Love Song: Complete Box (2006)

Singles from Diabolos
- 1. "Black Stone" Released: April 27, 2005; 2. "Metamorphoze" Released: May 25, 2005; 3. "Todokanai Ai to Shitteitanoni Osaekirezu ni Aishitsuzuketa..." Released: August 10, 2005

Diabolos is the sixth full-length studio album released by Japanese solo artist Gackt on September 21, 2005 in Japan, and on October 26, 2007, in eighteen countries across Europe. As a concept album, it is a sequel entrant to the "Moon Saga" found in the eighth studio album Last Moon and theatre play Mysteries of Yoshitsune I&II, as well prequel to his third and fourth studio albums, Moon and Crescent, the film Moon Child, and novel Moon Child Requiem.

== Moon Saga ==
In April 2005, with the release of the album's first single "Black Stone", was the turning point from compilation and unplugged themed albums in 2004 and early 2005, to alternative rock and continuation of "Moon Saga" from the fourth album Crescent in 2003. The name of the album doesn't literally symbolize Latin diabolus, but the darkness in human's heart, which is shown through the characters of the story. The album cover represents a person "taking off the mask", realizing another part of himself inside which is dark and evil.

Conceptually, the story of "Moon Saga" is separated in four chapters, roughly, first chapter from the year 700 to 1300, second from 1300 to 1600, third from 1600 to current time (2000), and fourth from the current time (2000) to near future (2045). The previous work covered the fourth chapter, while Diabolos in between the second and third chapter, roughly between 1500 and 1600. The whole story is set in both Europe and Asia (mostly Japan), depending on the story and meaning wanted to be expressed.

The story from the first chapter follows the "darkside inhabitants" - darts, who were scattered all over Europe, fighting for different countries even against fellow inhabitants in the shadow of history. The second chapter how they tried to make something that will surpass them and for purpose of fighting, so were created 13 "shitos" (使徒, apostle, disciple), but their body was incomplete and couldn't appear under the sun. From the third chapter, now known as "vampires", is followed their life. They didn't pursue their purpose of life, and as become aware of the darkness inside them, raises the question what is now their purpose of existence. After the awakening, two of the thirteen shito died (the man and woman shown in the music video of "Todokanai Ai to Shitteita noni, Osaekirezuni Aishitsuduketa..."), leaving behind eleven. Five out of the eleven decided to stand up and fight against the darts, their creators. They wanted to prove that there was meaning in their existence, however they were outnumbered, and there was only one shito survivor.

However, it is not a vampire's story as they were presented as a way of expressing a certain evil side and existence of humans. They long for immortality believing it's a wonderful thing, while vampires know how painful such an existence is and seek a peaceful death. The "Moon Saga" story is a symbolic story about the repetition of human sins, war and Diabolos carries the meaning of evil in the world, ephemerality of destiny, sadness as well hope in future. While the album Moon expressed the darkness inside which is locked away, Diabolos deeply opens it up and acknowledges it in ourselves.

In the album's booklet every song is accompanied with an image, each of which have a specific meaning to the story. The first song's, "Misty", picture is set in Europe, and symbolizes the wheel of fate and meeting with love companion after realizing their fate. The second "Farewell" is set in Japan during the first chapter, and means memory which is passed down to the next life. The third "Noesis" is both in Japan and Europe, showing the predicting of future through past memory. The fourth "Ash" is in Europe, and means feeling own soul. The fifth "Metamorphoze" is in Europe and asks the question: what's the purpose of existence and fighting? From the sixth track, "Dispar", to the eight track, "Black Stone", the pictures are set in Europe, and depict going to a battle ground, fighting to prove one's worth and the meaning of existence. The ninth "Storm" shows a "shito" hiding among "darts". The tenth "Road" depicts the tragic meeting of love companions, while the eleventh "Todokanai Ai to Shitteitanoni Osaekirezu ni Aishitsuzuketa..." is set around the year 2000 and serves as a link to fourth chapter, as well it is linked to Crescent's booklet.

== Composition ==
When compared to Gackt's past albums, it's notable for its heavy sound and rhythm. The songs on the album, although conceptually related, are independent from each other, and the overall sound vary from hard, progressive, alternative, symphonic, and ballad rock elements up to more melodious instrumental tracks "Misty" and "Future".

== Release ==
The album was released on September 21, 2005 in Japan by Nippon Crown. In the initial counting week of October it reached number four on the Oricon chart, with sales of 61,047 copies. In the upcoming week, it was at number seventeen respectively, with sales of 13,405 copies. It charted for 9 weeks, and sold over 100,000 copies, being certified Gold by the RIAJ.

Preceding the album release, were released three singles, "Black Stone", "Metamorphoze" and "Todokanai Ai to Shitteita no ni Osaekirezu ni Aishitsuzuketa...". The first single "Black Stone" reached number three on the second counting week of May, with sales of 42,712 copies. In the upcoming week, it was at number thirteen, with sales of 11,212 copies. It charted for 7 weeks, and sold over 100,000 copies, being certified Gold by RIAJ. The second single "Metamorphoze" reached number two on the first counting week of June, with sales of 90,588 copies. In the upcoming two weeks, it was at number seven and seventeen, with sales of 31,169 and 14,052 copies. It charted for 13 weeks, and with sales of 156,709 was the 62nd best-selling single of the year, certified Gold by RIAJ.

The third single "Todokanai Ai to Shitteita no ni Osaekirezu ni Aishitsuzuketa..." reached number three on the fourth counting week of August, with sales of 38,910 copies. In the upcoming week, it was at number fourteen, with sales of 13,669 copies. It charted for 9 weeks, and sold over 100,000 copies, being certified Gold by RIAJ.

== Promotion ==
On September 23, 2005, Gackt went on a, at the time, his longest nationwide tour Diabolos ~Aien no Shi~ (Diabolos ~哀婉の詩~, ~A Sorrowful Poem~) at Toda, Saitama, Japan. There were held 36 concerts in 26 cities across Japan, which ended with a final New Year's Eve spectacle at the Tokyo Dome, in front of more than forty-two thousand people. The final concert costed 500 million Yen (roughly $4.3 million) and included entering the arena on a horseback in full gallop, in a suspended coffin during "Lust for Blood", singing hanging 20m in the air, and disappearing in a sudden smoke explosion. In 2006, the tour was continued with a concert on January 14, in Korea, at Fencing Stadium in Korean Olympic Park, which was his first Asian solo concert.

== Track listing ==
All tracks are written by Gackt. C.

No.	Title	Length
1.	"Misty"	2:18
2.	"Farewell"	4:28
3.	"Noesis"	5:50
4.	"Ash"	4:32
5.	"Metamorphoze" (Metamorphoze ～メタモルフォーゼ～)	3:40
6.	"Dispar"	3:27
7.	"Future"	4:48
8.	"Black Stone"	3:14
9.	"Storm"	3:41
10.	"Road"	5:06
11.	"Todokanai Ai to Shitteita no ni Osaekirezu ni Aishitsuzuketa..." (届カナイ愛ト知ッテイタノニ 抑エキレズニ愛シ続ケタ… "Even Though I Knew This Love Could Never Reach You, I Continued to Love You Uncontrollably...")	4:38

=== Notes ===
- The song "Noesis" title is a Greek word noēsis, which is Nous - sometimes equated with intellect, understanding, awareness; a philosophical and psychological term for the faculty of the human mind which is described in classical philosophy as necessary for understanding what is true or real, objective from the subjective
- The song "Metamorphoze" was the opening theme song for the Mobile Suit Zeta Gundam first movie in trilogy Heirs to the Stars.
- The song "Todokanai Ai to Shitteita no ni Osaekirezu ni Aishitsuzuketa..." was used as the drama Keiyaku Kekkon's theme song.

== Album credits ==
Personnel

- Vocals, Piano: Gackt
- Guitar: Chachamaru, You
- Drums: Ryu, Toshiyuki Sugino
- Bass: Ju-ken
- Keyboards & Orchestra arrangement: Shusei Tsukamoto
- Strings: Gen Ittetsu, Masami Horisawa

Production

- Producer: Gackt
- Associate Producer: Chachamaru
- Executive Producer: Tomonari Sato (Nippon Crown), You Harada (Museum Museum)
- Recorded & Mixed by: Motonari Matsumoto
- Assistant Engineer: Masahiro Shinlo (Warner Music Recording Studio), Yoshinari Adachi (WestSide), Katsuyuki Abe (WestSide)
- Recording Coordinator: Maki Iida (Starboard Music)
- Mastering Engineer: Yoichi Aikawa (Rolling Sound Mastering Studio)

Design

- Art direction & Design: Jun Misaki
- Photographer: Kenji Tsukagoshi
