= Moon (Gackt album) =

Studio album by Gackt
- Released: June 19, 2002
- Recorded: 2002
- Genre: Art rock, pop rock, neo-prog
- Length: 53:34
- Label: Nippon Crown
- Producer: Gackt

Gackt chronology
Rebirth (2001)	Moon (2002)	Crescent (2003)

Singles from Moon
- 1. "Another World" Released: September 5, 2001; 2. "Wasurenai Kara" Released: April 24, 2002; 3. "Lu:na/Oasis" Released: June 30, 2003

Moon is the third full-length studio album released by Japanese solo artist Gackt on June 19, 2002. Instead of a booklet, the concept album comes with a printed note by the artist, asking readers to "sense" the record's story, rather than analyzing the lyrics. The booklet was eventually included in the packaging of Moon's 2003 follow-up Crescent. Both albums are linked, as well as his more recent albums Diabolos and Last Moon from the "Moon Saga".

== Release ==
The album was released on 19 June 2002, by Nippon Crown. In the initial counting week of July it reached number two on the Oricon charts, with sales of 185,840 copies. It charted for 10 weeks. In 2002, with sales of 281,590 copies, was the 67th best selling album of the year. As since its release the album has sold more than 250,000 copies, was certified Gold by the RIAJ.

The first single "Another World" became Gackt's first to reach the top two on the charts. The single reached number two on the third counting week of September 2001, with sales of 111,560 copies. In the upcoming weeks, it was at number three and eight respectively, with sales of 42,490, and 22,850 copies. It charted for 17 weeks, of that eight in the top twenty. In 2001, with 255,640 copies sold, it was the 74th best-selling single of the year, and it sold over 284,550 copies, most of any of his singles.

The second single "Wasurenai Kara" reached number four on the initial counting week of May 2002, with sales of 78,310 copies. It charted for 5 weeks. In 2002, with 132,260 copies sold, was the 98th best selling single of the year.

== Critical reception ==
Professional ratings
Review scores
Source	Rating
Allmusic	3.5/5 stars
Sputnikmusic	3.5/5 stars

Moon was generally positively received by reviews. Allmusic author Alexey Eremenko gave the album a rating of 3.5 out of 5 stars, observing that "is a fine specimen of its kind", it's "fast, emotive, heavy but not scary", praising the slow-tempo somber song "Fragrance", but criticized the album as "too fine and effective" that it becomes "sterile", and "sounds too much like music in general". He concluded that "despite the few musical connotations it actually possesses", as "far as artificial (read: professional) Japanese music goes, Moon is definitely one monster of a record".

Sputnikmusic's review also gave it 3.5/5 stars and highlighted the song "Fragrance", with "Rain", "Luna" and "Speed Master", but considered it to be "one of the most ridiculously top-heavy albums ... since the rest of the album doesn't provide nearly anywhere near the same level of satisfaction as the first six tracks do". In conclusion, felt that "the concept is effectively lost on anyone who can't speak fluent Japanese and ... the fact that almost half of Moon is a pretty uneventful pop-rock album would make it hard to "feel" the concept regardless".

== Track listing ==
All tracks are written by Gackt C.

No.	Title	Length
1.	"Noah"	2:14
2.	"Lu:na"	3:24
3.	"Wasurenai Kara" ("I'll never forget you...")	5:11
4.	"Soleil"	3:42
5.	"Speed Master"	3:41
6.	"Fragrance"	4:36
7.	"Death Wish"	5:53
8.	"Doomsday"	4:34
9.	"Missing"	4:30
10.	"Rain"	5:58
11.	"Another World"	3:07
12.	"Memories"	6:42

=== Notes ===
- The song "Lu:na" was used as an opening theme in the anime New Fist of the North Star, for which Gackt provided the voice of the main antagonist Seiji.
- The song "Another World" was used in the Neue Men's commercial for Shiseido.
- The song "Doomsday" was used in a Takano Yuri commercial.
- The song "Speed Master" was covered in partly English version by Gackt's band Yellow Fried Chickenz's and performed live including at Makuhari Messe in 2011, released on DVD recording World Tour *Show Ur Soul.I* 世壊傷結愛魂祭 at Makuhari 2011 in 2012.

== Album credits ==
Personnel

- Vocals, Piano: Gackt
- Guitar, Violin: You
- Guitar: Yukihiro "Chachamaru" Fujimura
- Guitar: Masa
- Effects, Guitar: Nao Kimura
- Bass: Ren
- Drums: Toshiyuki Sugino
- Drums: Ryuichi Nishida
- Bass: Crazy Cool Joe
- Bass: Koichi Terasawa
- Bass: Yoshihito Onda
- Drums: Kota Igarashi
- Violin: Gen Ittetsu
- Keyboards & Orchestra arrangement: Shusei Tsukamoto

Production

- Producer: Gackt
- Associate Producer: Yukihiro “Chachamaru” Fujimura
- Executive Producer: Masami Kudo (Nippon Crown), You Harada (Museum Museum)
- Recorded & Mixed & Pro Tools Edited: Motonari Matsumoto
- Assistant Engineer: Yoshitaka Ishigaki (Burnish), Michinori Sato (Burnish), Takanobu Suhiyama (Burnish), Chie Miyasaka (Burnish), Tadashi Yamaguchi (Studio Jive), Shinichi Tokumo (Sound Atelier), Teruaki Ise (Wonder station)
- Recording Coordinator: Maki Iida, Yoshihito Umeki (Burnish)
- Mastering Engineer: Yoichi Aikawa (Rolling Sound Mastering Studio)

Design

- Art direction, Design, Gun Coordinator: Jun Misaki
- Photographer: Kenji Tsukagoshi
