= Jūnigatsu no Love Songs: Complete Box =

Jūnigatsu no Love Songs: ~Complete Box~

Box set by Gackt
- Released: December 13, 2006
- Genre: Christmas, pop
- Length: 51:17
- Label: Nippon Crown
- Producer: Gackt

Gackt chronology
Diabolos (2005)	Jūnigatsu no Love Songs: ~Complete Box~ (2006)	0079–0088 (2007)

Jūnigatsu no Love Songs ~Complete Box~ (12月のLove songs〜COMPLETE BOX〜; December Love Songs ~Complete Box~) is a limited edition box set album released by Gackt on December 13, 2006. It ranked 55th on Oricon's album chart.

It contains nine different versions of the previously released single Jūnigatsu no Love Song, including the Chinese version duet with Leehom Wang, and four new versions. The box set also contained an aromatherapy diffuser and gold & silver foil postcards of the CD covers.

== Track listing ==
No.	Title	Length
1.	"12月のLove song [Japanese Version - 2004 Edition]"	5:22
2.	"December Love [English Version - New Recording]"	5:21
3.	"十二月的情歌; Shí'èr yuè de qínggē [Chinese Version feat. Leehom Wang]"	6:57
4.	"12월, 어느 사랑노래; 12wol Eoneu Sarangnorae [Korean Version]"	5:19
5.	"December Love Song [Korean Version feat. DJ Iso]"	5:25
6.	"12月のLove song [Japanese Version with Background Chorus]"	5:21
7.	"December Love [with Background Chorus]"	5:20
8.	"十二月的情歌; Shí'èr yuè de qínggē [Chinese Version with Background Chorus]"	6:57
9.	"December Love Song [Korean Version with Background Chorus]"	5:15
