= Graffiti (Gackt song) =

Single by Gackt
- B-side: "Iki Toshi Ikeru Subete ni Tsugu"
- Released: November 30, 2011
- Genre: Hard rock
- Length: 14:00
- Label: Avex Entertainment
- Songwriters: Ryo, Shoko Fujibayashi

Gackt singles chronology
"Episode.0" (2011)	"Graffiti" (2011)	"Until The Last Day" (2012)

Music video
- "Graffiti" on YouTube

"Graffiti" is the fortieth single of Japanese solo artist Gackt, released on November 30, 2011. It's the third opening song of the anime Sket Dance.

== Summary ==
Gackt announced that he will continue his collaboration with the anime Sket Dance in November. Dante, the vocalist of a band named JardiN, was modeled after Gackt, and he himself voiced the character. He also sang the song "Iki Toshi Ikeru Subete ni Tsugu", which Dante performs in the story.

The music video was filmed in the late-night streets of Shibuya, Tokyo. In the beginning, it features Gackt in the limousine and as he gets off the car as a camera guy follows him through the streets. It ends with him going to the parking area, and riding off on a horse he used in the NHK drama Fūrin Kazan and regularly uses at Joetsu city's Great Kenshin Festival.

== Track listings and formats ==
All lyrics are written by Shoko Fujibayashi; all music is composed by Ryo.

CD (AVCA-49097)
No.	Title	Length
1.	"Graffiti"	3:42
2.	"Iki Toshi Ikeru Subete ni Tsugu (生きとし生けるすべてに告ぐ)"	3:59
3.	"Graffiti (instrumental)"
4.	"Iki Toshi Ikeru Subete ni Tsugu (instrumental)"

CD + DVD (AVCA-49098)
No.	Title	Length
1.	"Graffiti (Music Film)"

== Charts ==
Oricon

Release	Provider(s)	Chart	Peak position	Sales total
November 30, 2011	Oricon	Weekly Singles	10	15,953
November 30, 2011	Oricon	Monthly Singles	38	—

Billboard Japan

Chart (2011)	Peak position
Billboard Japan Hot 100	21
Billboard Japan Hot Animation	3
