= Gekkou =

Gekkō

Video by Gackt
- Released: August 6, 2003
- Genre: Alternative rock, Pop rock, pop
- Length: 30:28
- Label: Nippon Crown

Gackt chronology
PLATINUM BOX III (2002)	Gekkō (2003)	PLATINUM BOX IV (2003)

Gekkō (月光 "moonlight") is a DVD released by Japanese singer Gackt on August 6, 2003.

== DVD content ==
1. Kimi Ga Oikaketa Yume (君が追いかけた夢)
2. Kimi Ga Oikaketa Yume (君が追いかけた夢) [Making of]
3. Tsuki no Uta (月の詩)
4. Tsuki no Uta (月の詩) [Making of]
5. Special Track

- Gackt in Hawaii
- Birthday prank on Ren
