= Mizérable (EP) =

EP by Gackt
- Released: May 12, 1999
- Recorded: 1999
- Studio: (Recording Studio); NRG Recording; Stagg Street st. Skip Saylor; Sound Chamber; Groovin'Art st.
- Genre: Art rock, symphonic rock, progressive rock
- Length: 20:16
- Label: Nippon Crown
- Producer: Gackt

Gackt chronology
Mizérable (1999)	Mars (2000)

Singles from Mizérable
- 1. "Mizérable" Released: July 9, 1999

Professional ratings
Review scores
Source	Rating
Sputnikmusic	4.5/5 stars

"Mizérable" is the debut extended-play or mini album of Japanese singer-songwriter Gackt, released on May 12, 1999, by Nippon Crown. It marked his solo debut, four months after he left Malice Mizer, immediately gaining success reaching second position on the Oricon Albums Chart.

All of the album's lyrics were written and music composed and produced by Gackt himself, and so it remained in all his albums. Musically incorporating violin, piano and modern rock instruments, with mixed pop-art rock sound, and recognizable emotional-metaphorical lyrics, the album suggested his future musical expression.

== Summary ==
In 1999, the 26-year-old Gackt was living in Tokyo, and trying to set up his solo project. He was joined by his fellow Cains:Feel members, You Kurosaki who became the rhythmic guitarist and violinist and Ren Aoba who became the bassist of his live supporting band, also the other, not-known members. Of them only Masa Shinozaki continued to be part of the support band. In February, Gackt travelled in Los Angeles, U.S. and France, to complete recording and filming. In April, he held his first concerts in 10 months called Gackt Easter Live - Resurrection, which was held in the Omiya Arche. It was a small event where he performed the song "Mizerable" live for the first time, as well talked with fans and announced the upcoming national tour.

The song "Mizerable" being the title song from the mini-album, was released one month later. This was first released as a single box containing a mini CD with the song and instrumental track, along VHS of the title song's promotional video and making of. Also nine days later a mini CD single version was released, containing no VHS. Also the song "Story" was re-recorded and released as a single titled "Saikai ~Story~" on August 30, 2000. Both songs were included on the 2004 compilation, The Sixth Day: Single Collection.

=== Release ===
The album was released on May 12, 1999, by Nippon Crown. In the fourth counting week of May it reached number two on the Oricon chart, with sales of 163,970 copies. In the upcoming week, it was at number ten respectively, with sales of 28,380 copies. It charted for 12 weeks, and with sales of 252,670 copies, it was the 95th best selling album of the year.

From the album were released two singles, "Mizérable", and a re-recording of "Story" titled "Saikai ~Story~", but is not considered the album's official single. The first single "Mizérable" reached number three on the second counting week of July, with sales of 65,530 copies. In the upcoming week, it was at number fifteen, with sales of 20,230 copies. It charted for 9 weeks, and sold over 116,771 copies. The second single "Saikai ~Story~" reached number seven on the second counting week of September 2000, with sales of 60,510 copies. It charted for 6 weeks, and sold over 91,200 copies.

== Track listing ==
All lyrics are written by Gackt C.; all music is composed by Gackt C. (except "M-2" with Yohei Shimada).

No.	Title	Length
1.	"Mizérable"	4:55
2.	"Story"	5:38
3.	"Leeca"	5:37
4.	"Lapis ~Prologue~"	4:02

== Album credits ==
Personnel

- Vocals: Gackt Camui
- Guitars: You Kurosaki, Hideki Ekawa, Masa Shinozaki, Ren Aoba, Nao
- Bass guitar: Ren Aoba, Chuck Wright
- Drums: Matt Sorum, Gackt Camui
- Piano: Gackt Camui
- Violin solo: Bruce Dukov
- Cello solo: Dennis Karamazyan
- Keyboards: Yohei Shimada, Gackt Camui
- Voice over: Val'erie Blier

Production

- Producer: Gackt
- Executive producer: Atsushi Takeshi, Masami Kudo (Nippon Crown)
- Engineer: Stan Katayama, Tetsuo Mori, Hiroto Kobayashi, John Aguto, Brian Kinkel
- String engineer: Nicholas Pike
- Mixing: Stan Katayama
- Programming: Takashi Furukawa, Yohei Shimada

Design

- Art direction: Yoichirou Fujii (Bakery37.1)
- Design: Maki Yoshikawa, Keiko Shimamura (Bakery37.1)
- Photography: William Hames, Bruce Ecker
