= Wasurenai kara =

"Wasurenai Kara"

Single by Gackt

from the album Moon
- Released: April 24, 2002
- Genre: Soft rock, Progressive rock, Alternative rock
- Length: 14:17
- Label: Nippon Crown
- Songwriter(s): Gackt C.
- Producer(s): Gackt

Gackt singles chronology
"Jūnigatsu no Love Song" (2001)	"Wasurenai Kara" (2002)	"Kimi ga Oikaketa Yume" (2003)

"Wasurenai Kara" (忘れないから) is the eleventh single by Japanese artist Gackt. It was released on April 24, 2002 under Nippon Crown. It peaked at fourth place on the Oricon Singles Chart and charted for five weeks. In 2002, it was the 98th best-selling single, with sales of 132,260 copies, making it Gackt's sixth best selling single.

== Track listing ==
No.	Title	Length
1.	"Wasurenai kara (忘れないから)"
2.	"Doomsday"
3.	"Wasurenai kara (忘れないから) (Instrumental)"
