= Vanilla (Gackt song) =

Single by Gackt

from the album Mars
- Released: August 11, 1999
- Genre: Pop rock
- Label: Nippon Crown
- Songwriter: Gackt C.
- Producer: Gackt

Gackt singles chronology
"Mizérable" (1999)	"Vanilla" (1999)	"Remix of Gackt" (1999)

Music video
- "Vanilla" on YouTube

"Vanilla" is a second single released by Gackt on August 11, 1999. It peaked at fourth place on the Oricon Singles Chart and charted for ten weeks. It is Gackt's second-best-selling single, with 248,360 copies sold. "Vanilla" was re-released on March 20, 2002, when it peaked at number twelve and charted for 6 weeks. It was certified gold by RIAJ.

== Track listing ==
No.	Title	Length
1.	"Vanilla"	4:06
2.	"Vanilla (Unplugged)"	3:59
3.	"Vanilla (Instrumental)"	4:06
