= Oasis (Gackt song) =

2000 single by Gackt

Single by Gackt

from the album Mars
- Released: February 16, 2000
- Genre: Progressive rock, art rock
- Length: 18:42
- Label: Nippon Crown
- Songwriter: Gackt C.
- Producer: Gackt

Gackt singles chronology
"Mirror" (2000)	"Oasis" (2000)	"Seki-Ray" (2000)

"Oasis" is a single released by Gackt on February 16, 2000 under Nippon Crown. It peaked at seventh place on the Oricon Singles Chart and charted for six weeks. It is Gackt's seventh best selling single, with 126,280 copies sold. The song "Oasis" was used as the ending theme for the New Fist of the North Star OVA in 2003, and released along "Lu:na" as a single "Lu:na/Oasis" the same year.

== Track listing ==
No.	Title	Length
1.	"Oasis"	4:44
2.	"Uncertain Memory"	5:01
3.	"Oasis (Instrumental)"	4:43
4.	"Uncertain Memory (Instrumental)"	4:54
