= Kimi ni Aitakute =

Single by Gackt

from the album Love Letter
- Released: October 27, 2004
- Genre: Pop, Acoustic rock
- Length: 19:30
- Label: Nippon Crown
- Songwriter(s): Gackt C.
- Producer(s): Gackt

Gackt singles chronology
"Last Song" (2003)	"Kimi ni Aitakute" (2004)	"Arittake no Ai de" (2005)

Music video
- "Kimi ni Aitakute" on YouTube

"Kimi ni Aitakute" (君に逢いたくて) is a single released by Gackt on October 27, 2004 under Nippon Crown. It peaked at second place on the Oricon Singles Chart and charted for seventeen weeks. In 2004, it was the 96th best selling single of the year, with sales of 98,335 copies. It ultimately sold 124,280 copies, making it Gackt's ninth best selling single. It was certified gold by RIAJ.

The title track is a piano ballad, while the second track with an acoustic guitar, both showcasing Gackt's emotional singing. The title track lyrics is a heartbreak song about feelings for your lover.

== Track listing ==
No.	Title	Length
1.	"Kimi ni Aitakute (君に逢いたくて)"	5:37
2.	"Peace (ピース)"	4:17
3.	"Kimi ni Aitakute (君に逢いたくて) (Instrumental)"	5:37
4.	"Peace (ピース) (Instrumental)"	4:08
