= Seki-Ray =

Single by Gackt

from the album Rebirth
- Released: March 8, 2000
- Genre: Symphonic rock
- Length: 13:39
- Label: Nippon Crown
- Songwriter: Gackt C.
- Producer: Gackt

Gackt singles chronology
"Oasis" (2000)	"Seki-Ray" (2000)	"Saikai (Story)" (2000)

"Seki-Ray" (鶺鴒〜seki-ray〜, Sekirei) is a single released by Gackt on March 8, 2000, under Nippon Crown. It peaked at seventh place on the Oricon weekly chart and charted for six weeks.

== Track listing ==
No.	Title	Length
1.	"Seki-Ray (鶺鴒〜seki-ray〜, Sekirei〜seki-ray〜)"	4:17
2.	"Seki-Ray (Instrumental String Arrange)"	5:13
3.	"Seki-Ray (Instrumental)"	4:09
