= Arittake no Ai de =

Single by Gackt

from the album Love Letter
- Released: January 26, 2005
- Genre: Pop, Acoustic rock
- Length: 17:45
- Label: Nippon Crown
- Songwriter(s): Gackt C.
- Producer(s): Gackt

Gackt singles chronology
"Kimi ni Aitakute" (2004)	"Arittake no Ai de" (2005)	"Black Stone" (2005)

Music video
- "Arittake no Ai de" on YouTube

"Arittake no Ai de" (ありったけの愛で) is a single released by Gackt on January 26, 2005 under Nippon Crown. It peaked at seventh place on the Oricon weekly chart and charted for seven weeks.

== Track listing ==
No.	Title	Length
1.	"Arittake no Ai de (ありったけの愛で)"	3:56
2.	"Kono Yoru ga Owaru Mae ni (この夜が終わる前に)"	5:01
3.	"Arittake no Ai de (ありったけの愛で) (Instrumental)"	3:55
4.	"Kono Yoru ga Owaru Mae ni (この夜が終わる前に) (Instrumental)"	4:53
