= Mirror (Gackt song) =

2000 single by Gackt

Single by Gackt

from the album Mars
- Released: February 9, 2000
- Genre: Alternative rock
- Length: 12:28
- Label: Nippon Crown
- Songwriter(s): Gackt C.
- Producer(s): Gackt

Gackt singles chronology
"Remix of Gackt" (1999)	"Mirror" (2000)	"Oasis" (2000)

"Mirror" is a single released by Gackt on February 9, 2000, under Nippon Crown. It peaked at ninth place on the Oricon weekly chart and charted for six weeks. The title song continued to be performed on almost every Gackt's tour, being a hard rock song combined with a violin, while the second track is a piano track skillfully balancing strength and aesthetics.

== Track listing (Gackt's version) ==
No.	Title	Length
1.	"Mirror"	4:35
2.	"Blue (Piano Solo)"	3:21
3.	"Mirror (Instrumental)"	4:32
