= Jūnigatsu no Love Song =

"Jūnigatsu no Love Song (12月のLove song)"

Single by Gackt
- Released: December 16, 2001
- Genre: Pop/Christmas music
- Label: Nippon Crown
- Songwriter(s): Gackt C.
- Producer(s): Gackt

Gackt singles chronology
"Another World" (2001)	"Jūnigatsu no Love Song (12月のLove song)" (2001)	"Wasurenai Kara" (2002)

Music video
- "Jūnigatsu no Love Song" on YouTube

"Jūnigatsu no Love Song" (12月のLove song) is the ninth, Christmas single by Japanese singer-songwriter Gackt, released on December 16, 2001, under Nippon Crown. It was also recorded in English, Chinese and Korean language until 2004, all versions charting in the Top 10 on the Oricon Singles Chart and selling cumulatively over 340,000 copies. They, with some updated recordings, were released in limited edition Jūnigatsu no Love Songs: Complete Box (2006).

== Summary ==
In 2001 Gackt went to visit one of the poorest countries in the world, Madagascar, and afterwards the world was in a state of tension due to September 11 attacks in the New York City, and he was moved and impressed how the children smile in the moment when they're hungry and there's a gap between the rich and the poor worldwide. Gackt decided to write a song for a world peace and love, and to film the music video in New York.

The single was first released on December 16, 2001, as a Christmas single, but until 2004, was recorded in four different languages, Japanese, English, Chinese and Korean. In 2005, was re-recorded the Korean version of the song in collaboration with M.C the Max (Isoo), and released as a digital download. The Chinese version of the song was re-recorded in duet with Leehom Wang, and others versions were also re-recorded, and released in the last installment of this single-series, Jūnigatsu no Love Songs ~Complete Box~, box set released on December 13, 2006. On November 27, Gackt appeared and performed the song in Japanese, Korean, and Mandarin language on the grand concert of the "2007 Japan-China Cultural Exchange" in Beijing.

=== Release ===
"Jūnigatsu no Love Song"
A 30-second sample of "Jūnigatsu no Love Song", a Christmas love song. It was later recorded in English, Korean and Chinese.

The single in Japanese language, reached number six on the fourth counting week of December 2001, with sales of 56,030 copies. In the upcoming three weeks, one in December and two in January 2002, it was at number five, ten and seventeen, with sales of 48,710, and 41,250, and 9,670 copies. It charted for 9 weeks, and in 2002, with sales of 171,050 copies, was the 73rd best selling single of the year. The English single reached number five on the second counting week of December 2002, with sales of 38,396 copies. In the upcoming week, it was at number sixteen, with sales of 13,269 copies. It charted for 11 weeks, and sold 81,594 copies.

The Chinese single reached number six on the third counting week of December 2003, with sales of 26,997 copies. In the upcoming week, it was at number eighteen, with sales of 8,924 copies. It charted for 8 week, and sold 51,748 copies. The final single in Korean reached number eight, with sales of 22,592 copies. It charted for 7 weeks, and sold 36,767 copies.

== Track listing ==
Jūnigatsu no Love Song; December 16, 2001
No.	Title	Length
1.	"Jūnigatsu no Love Song (12月のLove song)"	6:45
2.	"Jūnigatsu no Love Song (Instrumental)"	6:35

Jūnigatsu no Love Song/December Love (English); November 27, 2002
No.	Title	Length
1.	"Jūnigatsu no Love Song"
2.	"December Love"
3.	"Jūnigatsu no Love Song (Instrumental)"

Jūnigatsu no Love Song/十二月的情歌 (Chinese); December 3, 2003
No.	Title	Length
1.	"Jūnigatsu no Love Song"
2.	"十二月的情歌; Shí'èr yuè de qínggē"
3.	"Jūnigatsu no Love Song Instrumental)"

Jūnigatsu no Love Song/December Love Song (Korean); December 8, 2004
No.	Title	Length
1.	"Jūnigatsu no Love Song"
2.	"12월, 어느 사랑노래; 12wol Eoneu Sarangnorae"
3.	"Jūnigatsu no Love Song Instrumental)"
