= Secret Garden (Gackt song) =

2000 single by Gackt

Single by Gackt

from the album Rebirth
- Released: November 16, 2000
- Genre: Alternative rock, Art rock, Progressive rock
- Length: 13:29
- Label: Nippon Crown
- Songwriter: Gackt C.
- Producer: Gackt

Gackt singles chronology
"Saikai (Story)" (2000)	"Secret Garden" (2000)	"Kimi no Tameni Dekiru Koto" (2001)

"Secret Garden" is a single released by Gackt on November 16, 2000, under Nippon Crown. It peaked at tenth place on the Oricon weekly chart and charted for five weeks.

== Track listing ==
No.	Title	Length
1.	"Secret Garden"	4:45
2.	"Nine Spiral"	4:05
3.	"Secret Garden (Instrumental)"	4:37
