= Saikai (Story) =

2000 single by Gackt

Single by Gackt
- Released: August 30, 2000
- Genre: Alternative rock
- Length: 16:01
- Label: Nippon Crown
- Songwriter(s): Gackt C.
- Producer(s): Gackt

Gackt singles chronology
"Seki-Ray" (2000)	"Saikai (Story)" (2000)	"Secret Garden" (2000)

"Saikai (Story)" (再会〜Story〜) is a single released by Gackt on August 30, 2000 under Nippon Crown. "Saikai ~Story~" is a re-recording of the mostly instrumental song from the extended play Mizérable (titled "Story"). It peaked at seventh place on the Oricon weekly chart and charted for six weeks. The song is used as the ending theme of the TV variety show Hot Pants (ホットパンツ).

== Track listing ==
No.	Title	Length
1.	"Saikai (Story) (再会〜Story〜)"	5:48
2.	"Dears (Live)"	5:15
3.	"Saikai (Story) (Instrumental)"	5:40
