= Another World (Gackt song) =

Single by Gackt

from the album Moon
- Released: September 5, 2001
- Genre: Alternative rock/Art rock
- Length: 10:58
- Label: Nippon Crown
- Songwriter: Gackt C.
- Producer: Gackt

Gackt singles chronology
"Kimi no Tameni Dekiru Koto" (2001)	"Another World" (2001)	"Jūnigatsu no Love Song" (2001)

Music video
- "Another World" on YouTube

"Another World" is the ninth single by Japanese musical artist Gackt. It was released on September 5, 2001, and peaked at second place on the Oricon Singles Chart and charted for seventeen weeks. In 2001, with sales of 255,640 copies, it was the 74th best selling single of the year. It is Gackt's best selling single with 285,550 copies sold. He performed the song at the annual New Year's Eve TV show, Kouhaku Uta Gassen.

Gackt used both songs as the introduction and opening to the "Moon Project, while the "Another World" promotional video was used as a preview for his co-written and co-starred 2003 film Moon Child.

The music video was filmed in Hong Kong and Gackt considered it one of his music videos it was hardest to film, saying "it took days and days to shoot, from morning to night. We filmed as though we were shooting a movie, so it was a real tough one".

The song is used in neue MEN's advertisement for Shiseido.

== Track listing ==
No.	Title	Length
1.	"Another World"	3:11
2.	"Fragrance"	4:43
3.	"Another World (Instrumental)"	3:11
