= Kimi no Tame ni Dekiru Koto =

Single by Gackt

from the album Rebirth
- Released: March 14, 2001
- Genre: Alternative rock, pop rock
- Length: 13:46
- Label: Nippon Crown
- Songwriter(s): Gackt C.
- Producer(s): Gackt

Gackt singles chronology
"Secret Garden" (2000)	"Kimi no Tame ni Dekiru Koto" (2001)	"Another World" (2001)

Music video
- "Kimi no Tame ni Dekiru Koto" on YouTube

"Kimi no Tame ni Dekiru Koto" (君のためにできること, What I can do for you) is a single released by Gackt on March 14, 2001, under Nippon Crown. It peaked at sixth place on the Oricon Singles Chart and charted for eighteen weeks. It is Gackt's fifth best selling single, with 146,770 copies sold. The title track was later covered as an acoustic track for Gackt's Seventh Night album in 2004.

== Track listing ==
No.	Title	Length
1.	"Kimi no Tame ni Dekiru Koto (君のためにできること)"	4:19
2.	"Cube"	5:14
3.	"Kimi no Tame ni Dekiru Koto (Instrumental)"	4:10
