= Black Stone (song) =

Single by Gackt

from the album Diabolos
- Released: April 27, 2005
- Genre: Alternative rock, pop punk
- Length: 3:23
- Label: Nippon Crown
- Songwriter(s): Gackt C.
- Producer(s): Gackt

Gackt singles chronology
"Arittake no Ai de" (2005)	"Black Stone" (2005)	"Metamorphoze" (2005)

Music video
- "Black Stone" on YouTube

"Black Stone" is a single released by Gackt on April 27, 2005 under Nippon Crown. It peaked at third place on the Oricon weekly chart and charted for seven weeks. It was certified gold by RIAJ.

== Track listing ==
No.	Title	Length
1.	"Black Stone"	3:23
2.	"Ash"	4:40
3.	"Black Stone (Instrumental)"	3:22
4.	"Ash (Instrumental)"	4:40
