= Todokanai Ai to Shitteita no ni Osaekirezu ni Aishitsuzuketa... =

Single by Gackt

from the album Diabolos
- Released: August 10, 2005
- Genre: Progressive rock, hard rock
- Length: 21:19
- Label: Nippon Crown
- Songwriter(s): Gackt C.
- Producer(s): Gackt

Gackt singles chronology
"Metamorphoze" (2005)	"Todokanai Ai to Shitteita no ni Osaekirezu ni Aishitsuzuketa..." (2005)	"Redemption" (2006)

Music video
- "Todokanai Ai to Shitteita no ni Osaekirezu ni Aishitsuzuketa..." on YouTube

"Todokanai Ai to Shitteita no ni Osaekirezu ni Aishitsuzuketa..." (届カナイ愛ト知ッテイタノニ抑エキレズニ愛シ続ケタ…, "I still continue to love you, uncontrollably") is a single released by Gackt on August 10, 2005 under Nippon Crown.

It peaked at third place on the Oricon Singles Chart and charted for nine weeks. It was certified gold by RIAJ.

It was used as a theme song for the TV drama Keiyaku Kekkon (契約結婚).

== Music video ==
The music video shows two vampires from the "Moon" story and its album Diabolos.

== Track listing ==
No.	Title	Length
1.	"Todokanai Ai to Shitteita no ni Osaekirezu ni Aishitsuzuketa... (届カナイ愛ト知ッテイタノニ抑エキレズニ愛シ続ケタ…)"	4:46
2.	"noesis"	6:01
3.	"Todokanai Ai to Shitteita no ni Osaekirezu ni Aishitsuzuketa... (Instrumental)"	4:46
4.	"noesis (Instrumental)"	5:52
