= Metamorphoze =

Single by Gackt

from the album Diabolos
- A-side: "Metamorphoze"
- B-side: "Kimi ga Matteiru Kara Remix"
- Released: May 25, 2005
- Genre: Progressive rock, hard rock
- Length: 16:00
- Label: Nippon Crown
- Songwriter(s): Gackt C.
- Producer(s): Gackt

Gackt singles chronology
| "Black Stone" (2005) | "Metamorphoze" (2005) | "Todokanai Ai to Shitteita..." (2005) |

Alternative covers
- Limited edition

"Metamorphoze" (Metamorphoze ～メタモルフォーゼ～, Metamorufōze) is a single released by Gackt on May 25, 2005 under Nippon Crown.

It peaked at second place on the Oricon Singles Chart and charted for thirteen weeks. In 2005, it was the 62nd best selling single of the year, with sales of 156,709 copies, making it to be Gackt's fourth best selling single. It was certified gold by RIAJ.

On the request of Gundam general director Yoshiyuki Tomino, A-side and B-side featured in the Mobile Suit Zeta Gundam movie Heir to the Stars, B-side "Kimi Ga Matteiru Kara" from previous album Crescent was re-arranged.

The music video combines footage from the anime with live-action sequences of Gackt piloting in a UC 0093 (Char's Counterattack era) spacesuit and linear seat (a type of cockpit setup in the Gundam series).

== Track listing ==
| No. | Title | Length |
|---|---|---|
| 1. | "Metamorphoze (Metamorphoze ～メタモルフォーゼ～, Metamorufōze)" | 3:48 |
| 2. | "Kimi ga Matteiru kara <Remix> (君が待っているから <ReMix>)" | 4:21 |
| 3. | "Metamorphoze (Instrumental)" | 3:47 |
| 4. | "Kimi ga Matteiru kara (Instrumental)" | 4:21 |
