= Mizérable (song) =

Single by Gackt

from the album Mizérable
- Released: June 30, 1999; July 09, 1999
- Recorded: 1999, Los Angeles, U.S. NRG Recording Studios
- Genre: Symphonic rock, Art rock
- Length: 4:57
- Label: Nippon Crown
- Songwriter(s): Gackt C.
- Producer(s): Gackt

Gackt singles chronology
"Mizérable" (1999)	"Vanilla" (1999)

Alternative cover
- CD only version cover

"Mizérable" is a single by Japanese singer-songwriter Gackt from his same-titled debut mini album. It was released on June 30, 1999, by Nippon Crown as his debut single, in a box edition. It was also available in a mini CD single edition, without additional material.

== Summary ==
In 1999, the 26-year-old Gackt Camui was living in Tokyo, and trying to set up his solo project after departing from Malice Mizer. He was joined by his fellow Cains:Feel members, You Kurosaki who became the rhythmic guitarist and violinist and Ren Aoba who became the bassist of his live supporting band, also the others not-known members. Of them only Masa Shinozaki continued to be part of the support band. In February, Gackt travelled in Los Angeles, U.S. and France, to complete recording and filming.

In April 1999, he held his first performance in 10 months called Gackt Easter Live - Resurrection, which was held in the Omiya Arche. It was a small event where he performed the song "Mizerable" live for the first time, as well talked with fans and announcing the upcoming national tour.

"Mizérable" is the title song from the mini-album Mizérable, released one month prior. This was first released as a single box containing a mini CD with the song and instrumental track, along VHS of the title song's promotional video and making of. Nine days later a mini CD single version was released, containing no VHS. The song was included on the 2004 compilation, The Sixth Day: Single Collection.

=== Reception ===
The single box of "Mizérable" reached number 3 and charted for a total of 9 weeks on the Oricon Singles Chart, since its release, the single has sold 116,771 copies. It was Gackt's first single to enter the top ten singles chart position. The mini CD single version although managed to enter the charts, it failed to reach the top ten. It peaked at number 72 and charted for 6 weeks.

== Track listings and formats ==
All songs written and composed by Gackt C.

- 3"CD+VHS single (CRCP-218)
1. "Mizérable" - 4:57
2. "Mizérable (Instrumental)" - 4:57
1. "Mizérable" (Promotional Video)
2. "Mizérable" (Making of)
- 3" single (CRDP-221)
1. "Mizérable"
2. "Mizérable (Instrumental)"
